= Moritaka Land Tour 1990.3.3 at NHK Hall =

- Blu-ray box set cover

Video by Chisato Moritaka
- Released: September 18, 2013
- Recorded: March 3, 1990
- Venue: NHK Hall; Shibuya, Tokyo, Japan
- Length: 126 minutes
- Language: Japanese
- Label: Warner Music Japan
- Producer: Yukio Seto

Chisato Moritaka chronology
Chisato Moritaka DVD Collection No. 14 (2000)	Moritaka Land Tour 1990.3.3 at NHK Hall (2013)	Love Vol. 1 (2013)

Music video
- Moritaka Land Tour 1990.3.3 at NHK Hall trailer on YouTube

Moritaka Land Tour 1990.3.3 at NHK Hall (森高ランド・ツアー1990.3.3 at NHKホール) is a live video by Japanese singer-songwriter Chisato Moritaka. Recorded live at the NHK Hall in Shibuya, Tokyo on March 3, 1990, the video was released on September 18, 2013, by Warner Music Japan on Blu-ray and DVD formats; each with a two-disc audio CD version of the concert. A limited edition Blu-ray box set includes a bonus DVD of the March 7 concert at Tokyo Kōsei Nenkin Kaikan, a digitally remastered version of the Moritaka Land CD, a 68-page booklet, a miniature reprint of the original tour pamphlet, three original photos, and a full-size poster. The video was released to coincide with the 25th anniversary of Moritaka's music career, as well as her return to the music industry after retiring in 2000.

The video peaked at No. 5 on Oricon's Blu-ray chart and at No. 32 on Oricon's DVD chart.

== Track listing ==
Blu-ray/DVD

All lyrics are written by Chisato Moritaka, except where indicated; all music is composed by Hideo Saitō, except where indicated.

No.	Title	Lyrics	Music	Length
1.	"Nozokanaide" ((のぞかないで; "Don't Look"))
2.	"Uwasa" ((うわさ; "Rumor"))
3.	"Ureshī Hina Matsuri" ((うれしいひなまつり; "Happy Doll Festival"))	Hachirō Satō	Naonori Kawamura
4.	"Mite" ((見て; "Look"))
5.	"A-kun no Higeki" ((A君の悲劇; "The Tragedy of Boy A"))
6.	"Yume no Naka no Kiss" (Yume no Naka no Kisu (夢の中のキス; "A Kiss in a Dream"))		Yuichi Takahashi
7.	"Good-Bye Season"	Kanon Kuwa	Takumi Yamamoto
8.	"Yoru no Entotsu" ((夜の煙突; "Night Chimney"))	Masataro Naoe	Naoe
9.	"Yume no Owari" ((夢の終り; "The End of a Dream"))	Shingo Kanno
10.	"Michi" ((道; "Road"))		Shinji Yasuda
11.	"17-sai" (Jūnana-sai (17才; "17 Years Old"))	Mieko Arima	Kyōhei Tsutsumi
12.	"Pink Lady Medley: Pepper Keibu; S.O.S.; Nagisa no Sindbad; Southpaw; UFO; " ((ピンク・レディー・メドレー～ペッパー警部～S･O･S～渚のシンドバッド～サウスポー～UFO))	Yū Aku	Shunichi Tokura
13.	"The Stress" (Za Sutoresu (ザ・ストレス))
14.	"Mi-ha" (Mīhā (ミーハー))
15.	"Sonogo no Watashi [Moritaka Connection]" (Sonogo no Watashi (Moritaka Konekushon) (その後の私［森高コネクション］; "Me Afterwards (Moritaka Connection)"))
16.	"Overheat Night" (Ōbāhīto Naito (オーバーヒート・ナイト))	Hiromasa Ijichi
17.	"Get Smile"	Ijichi	Ken Shima
18.	"Seishun" ((青春; "Youth"))
19.	"Alone (Encore)" (Arōn (アローン))		Yasuda
20.	"New Season '90 (Encore)"	HIRO
21.	"Daite (Las Vegas Version) (Encore)" (Daite (Rasu Begasu Vājon) (だいて (ラスベガス・ヴァージョン); "Hold Me (Las Vegas Version)"))		Takahashi

CD

Disc 1
No.	Title	Length
1.	"Nozokanaide"	6:05
2.	"Uwasa"	7:25
3.	"Ureshī Hina Matsuri"	1:46
4.	"Mite"	6:34
5.	"A-kun no Higeki"	4:53
6.	"Yume no Naka no Kiss"	2:57
7.	"Good-Bye Season"	3:55
8.	"Yoru no Entotsu"	10:14
9.	"Yume no Owari"	7:57
10.	"Michi"	4:49
Total length:		56:18

Disc 2
No.	Title	Length
1.	"17-sai"	4:55
2.	"Pink Lady Medley"	8:26
3.	"The Stress"	4:48
4.	"Mi-ha"	5:55
5.	"Sonogo no Watashi [Moritaka Connection]"	3:54
6.	"Overheat Night"	3:55
7.	"Get Smile"	5:32
8.	"Seishun"	5:58
9.	"Alone (Encore)"	7:20
10.	"New Season '90 (Encore)"	9:00
11.	"Daite (Las Vegas Version) (Encore)"	6:01
Total length:		65:48

Box set bonus DVD – Moritaka Land Tour 1990.3.7 at Tokyo Kōsei Nenkin Kaikan

No.	Title	Lyrics	Music	Length
1.	"Nozokanaide"
2.	"Uwasa"
3.	"Te no Hira wo Taiyō ni" ((手のひらを太陽に; "Place Your Palms on the Sun"))	Takashi Yanase	Taku Izumi
4.	"Mite"
5.	"A-kun no Higeki"
6.	"Yume no Naka no Kiss"
7.	"Good-Bye Season"
8.	"Yoru no Entotsu"
9.	"Yume no Owari"
10.	"Michi"
11.	"17-sai"
12.	"Pink Lady Medley"
13.	"The Stress"
14.	"The Mi-ha"
15.	"Sonogo no Watashi [Moritaka Connection]"
16.	"Overheat Night"
17.	"Get Smile"
18.	"Seishun (Encore)"
19.	"Alone (Encore)"
20.	"New Season '90 (Encore)"
21.	"Daite (Las Vegas Version) (Encore)"

== Personnel ==
- Chisato Moritaka – vocals, keyboard, rhythm guitar
- The Sindbads

- Yasuaki Maejima – keyboards
- Shin Kono – keyboards
- Hiroyoshi Matsuo – guitar
- Masafumi Yokoyama – bass
- Makoto Yoshiwara – drums

== Charts ==
Chart (2013)	Peak position
Blu-Ray Disc Chart (Oricon)	5
DVD Chart (Oricon)	32
