= Chisato Moritaka in 1990 =

Video by Chisato Moritaka
- Released: May 27, 2015
- Recorded: November 29, 1990 (disc 1/CD); August 28, 1990 (disc 2)
- Venues: Utsonomiya City Cultural Hall (disc 1/CD); Hamamatsu Civic Center (disc 2)
- Length: 86 minutes (disc 1); 80 minutes (disc 2)
- Language: Japanese
- Label: Warner Music Japan
- Producer: Yukio Seto

Chisato Moritaka chronology
Love Vol. 8 (2015)	Chisato Moritaka in 1990 (2015)	Love Vol. 9 (2015)

Music video
- Chisato Moritaka in 1990 trailer on YouTube

Chisato Moritaka in 1990 (1990年の森高千里, Senkyūhyakukyūjū-nen no Moritaka Chisato) is a live video by Japanese singer-songwriter Chisato Moritaka. Recorded live at the Utsonomiya City Cultural Hall in Utsunomiya, Tochigi on November 29, 1990, and at the Hamamatsu Civic Center in Hamamatsu, Shizuoka on August 28, 1990, the video was released on May 27, 2015, by Warner Music Japan on Blu-ray and DVD formats; each with an audio CD of the Utsunomiya show. A limited edition Blu-ray boxed set includes an 84-page photobook, a 52-page booklet chronicling Moritaka's 1990 tour, a 2015–2016 calendar, a special edition portrait with download code, a notebook, and a replica backstage pass.

The video peaked at No. 27 on Oricon's Blu-ray chart and at No. 80 on Oricon's DVD chart.

== Track listing ==
All lyrics are written by Chisato Moritaka, except where indicated; all music is composed by Hideo Saitō, except where indicated.

Disc 1/CD: Utsunomiya University School Festival Live, November 29, 1990
No.	Title	Lyrics	Music	Length
1.	"Kusai Mono ni wa Futa wo Shiro!!" ("Shut Your Stinking Trap!! (臭いものにはフタをしろ！！))
2.	"Hadaka ni wa Naranai" ((はだかにはならない; "I Don't Get Naked"))	Masataro Naoe	Naoe
3.	"Seishun" ((青春; "Youth"))
4.	"Overheat Night" (Ōbāhīto Naito (オーバーヒート・ナイト))	Hiromasa Ijichi
5.	"Aru OL no Seishun ~ A-ko no Baai ~ (Moritaka Connection)" (Aru Ō Ēru no Seishun ~ Ē-ko no Baai ~ (Moritaka Konekushon) (あるOLの青春～A子の場合～ (森高コネクション); "A Certain Young Office Lady ~ In the case of Child A ~ (Moritaka Connection)"))
6.	"Ame (Album Version)" (Ame (Arubamu Vājon) (雨（アルバム・ヴァージョン）; "Rain (Album Version)"))		Seiji Matsuura
7.	"Yoru no Entotsu" ((夜の煙突; "Night Chimney"))	Naoe	Naoe
8.	"Stress" (Sutoresu (ストレス))
9.	"Sonogo no Watashi (Moritaka Connection)" (Sonogo no Watashi (Moritaka Konekushon) (その後の私 [森高コネクション]; "Me Afterwards (Moritaka Connection)"))
10.	"17-sai" (Jūnana-sai (17才; "17 Years Old"))	Mieko Arima	Kyōhei Tsutsumi
11.	"Funky Monkey Baby" (Fankī Monkī Beibī (ファンキー・モンキー・ベイビー))	George Ōkura	Eikichi Yazawa
12.	"Mi-ha" (Mīhā (ミーハー))
13.	"Get Smile"	Ijichi	Ken Shima
14.	"Teriyaki Burger" (Teriyaki Bāgā (テリヤキ・バーガー))
15.	"Michi (Encore)" ((道; "Road"))		Shinji Yasuda
16.	"Daite" ((だいて; "Hold Me"))		Yuichi Takahashi

Disc 2: Hamamatsu Civic Center Summer Event, August 28, 1990
No.	Title	Lyrics	Music	Length
1.	"Uwasa" ((うわさ; "Rumor"))
2.	"Hadaka ni wa Naranai" ((はだかにはならない; "I Don't Get Naked"))	Naoe	Naoe
3.	"Let Me Go"	Ijichi; Moritaka	Yasuda
4.	"Good-Bye Season"	Kanon Kuwa	Takumi Yamamoto
5.	"Overheat Night" (Ōbāhīto Naito (オーバーヒート・ナイト))	Ijichi
6.	"Kusai Mono ni wa Futa wo Shiro!!" ("Shut Your Stinking Trap!! (臭いものにはフタをしろ！！))
7.	"Seishun" ((青春; "Youth"))
8.	"Michi" ((道; "Road"))		Yasuda
9.	"Stress" (Sutoresu (ストレス))
10.	"A-Kimi no Higeki" ((A君の悲劇; "The Tragedy of Boy A"))
11.	"17-sai" (Jūnana-sai (17才; "17 Years Old"))	Arima	Tsutsumi
12.	"Mi-ha" (Mīhā (ミーハー))
13.	"Sonogo no Watashi (Moritaka Connection)" (Sonogo no Watashi (Moritaka Konekushon) (その後の私 [森高コネクション]; "Me Afterwards (Moritaka Connection)"))
14.	"Yoru no Entotsu" ((夜の煙突; "Night Chimney"))	Naoe	Naoe
15.	"Mite" ((見て; "Look"))
16.	"Alone (Encore)" (Arōn (アローン))		Yasuda
17.	"New Season"	HIRO

== Personnel ==
- Chisato Moritaka – vocals, keyboards
- The Janet Jacksons

- Yasuaki Maejima – keyboards
- Shin Kono – keyboards, guitar
- Hiroyoshi Matsuo – guitar
- Masafumi Yokoyama – bass
- Makoto Yoshiwara – drums

== Charts ==
Chart (2015)	Peak position
Blu-Ray Disc Chart (Oricon)	27
DVD Chart (Oricon)	64
