= Kokon Tozai ~ Oni ga Deru ka Hebi ga Deru ka Tour '91 ~ Kanzen-han =

Video by Chisato Moritaka
- Released: September 17, 2014
- Recorded: March 3, 1991
- Venue: Nakano Sunplaza; Nakano, Tokyo, Japan
- Length: 116 minutes
- Language: Japanese
- Label: Warner Music Japan
- Producer: Yukio Seto

Chisato Moritaka chronology
Love Vol. 6 (2014)	Kokon Tozai ~ Oni ga Deru ka Hebi ga Deru ka Tour '91 ~ Kanzen-han (2014)	Love Vol. 7 (2015)

Music video
- Kokon Tozai ~ Oni ga Deru ka Hebi ga Deru ka Tour '91 ~ Kanzen-han trailer on YouTube

Kokon Tozai ~ Oni ga Deru ka Hebi ga Deru ka Tour '91 ~ Kanzen-han (古今東西～鬼が出るか蛇がでるかツアー‘91～完全版, lit. All Times and Places ~ Demon or Snake Appearing Tour '91 ~ Complete Version) is a live video by Japanese singer-songwriter Chisato Moritaka. Recorded live at the Nakano Sunplaza in Nakano, Tokyo on March 3, 1991, the video was released on September 17, 2014, by Warner Music Japan on Blu-ray and DVD formats; each with a two-disc audio CD version of the concert. It is a digitally remastered version of the live video originally released on June 17, 1991, with two additional songs and previously unreleased footage. A limited edition Blu-ray boxed set includes a Blu-ray copy of the original 1991 cut, a photo booklet, a miniature reprint of the original tour pamphlet, and a sticker sheet.

The video peaked at No. 13 on Oricon's Blu-ray chart and at No. 83 on Oricon's DVD chart.

== Track listing ==
Blu-ray/DVD

All lyrics are written by Chisato Moritaka, except where indicated; all music is composed by Hideo Saitō, except where indicated.

No.	Title	Lyrics	Music	Length
1.	"Opening" (Ōpuningu (オープニング))
2.	"Oni Taiji" ((鬼たいじ; "Demon Hunting"))
3.	"Ureshī Hina Matsuri*" ((うれしいひなまつり; "Happy Doll Festival"))	Hachirō Satō	Naonori Kawamura
4.	"Kondo Watashi Doko ka Tsurete itte Kudasai yo" ((今度私どこか連れていって下さいよ; "Take Me Out Somewhere Next Time"))
5.	"Aru OL no Seishun ~ A-ko no Baai ~ (Moritaka Connection)" (Aru Ō Ēru no Seishun ~ Ē-ko no Baai ~ (Moritaka Konekushon) (あるOLの青春～A子の場合～ (森高コネクション); "A Certain Young Office Lady ~ In the case of Child A ~ (Moritaka Connection)"))
6.	"Hare*" ((晴れ; "Sunny"))		Yuichi Takahashi
7.	"Kusai Mono ni wa Futa wo Shiro!! ~ Rock 'n' Roll Widow" ((臭いものにはフタをしろ！！～ロックンロール・ウィドウ; "Shut Your Stinking Trap!! ~ Rock 'n' Roll Widow"))	Moritaka; Yoko Aki	Saitō; Ryudo Uzaki
8.	"Hong Kong" ((香港))
9.	"Sanhyakurokujūgo-ho no March (Live Ongende wa Arimasen)*" ((三百六十五歩のマーチ(ライヴ音源ではありません); "365-step March (Not a Live Track)"))	Tetsurō Hoshino	Masao Yoneyama
10.	"New Season '90 (Single Medley 1)"	HIRO
11.	"Overheat Night (Single Medley 2)" (Ōbāhīto Naito (オーバーヒート・ナイト))	Hiromasa Ijichi
12.	"Alone (Single Medley 3)" (Arōn (アローン))		Shinji Yasuda
13.	"Michi (Single Medley 4)" ((道; "Road"))		Yasuda
14.	"The Stress (Single Medley 5)" (Za Sutoresu (ザ・ストレス))
15.	"Get Smile (Single Medley 6)"	Ijichi	Ken Shima
16.	"Benkyō no Uta" ((勉強の歌; "Study Song"))
17.	"Kono Machi" ((この街; "This Town))
18.	"17-sai (Single Medley 9)" (Jūnana-sai (17才; "17 Years Old"))	Mieko Arima	Kyōhei Tsutsumi
19.	"Sonogo no Watashi [Moritaka Connection]" (Sonogo no Watashi (Moritaka Konekushon) (その後の私［森高コネクション］; "Me Afterwards (Moritaka Connection)"))
20.	"Funky Monkey Baby" (Fankī Monkī Beibī (ファンキー・モンキー・ベイビー))	George Ōkura	Eikichi Yazawa
21.	"Yoru no Entotsu" ((夜の煙突; "Night Chimney"))	Masataro Naoe	Naoe
22.	"Teriyaki Burger" (Teriyaki Bāgā (テリヤキ・バーガー))
23.	"The Busters Blues (Encore 1)" (Za Basutāzu Burūsu (ザ・バスターズ・ブルース))
24.	"The Mi-ha*" (Za Mīhā (ザ・ミーハー))
25.	"Ame (Rock Version)" (Ame (Rokku Vājon) (雨（ロック・ヴァージョン）; "Rain" (Rock Version)))		Seiji Matsuura
26.	"Mite (Encore 2)*" ((見て; "Look"))
Total length:				116 minutes

* Previously unreleased track.

CD

Disc 1
No.	Title	Lyrics	Music	Length
1.	"Opening"			2:07
2.	"Oni Taiji"			4:15
3.	"Ureshī Hina Matsuri"	Satō	Kawamura	1:34
4.	"Kondo Watashi Doko ka Tsurete itte Kudasai yo"			3:29
5.	"Aru OL no Seishun ~ A-ko no Baai ~ (Moritaka Connection)"			3:59
6.	"Hare"			2:47
7.	"Kusai Mono ni wa Futa wo Shiro!! ~ Rock 'n' Roll Widow"	Moritaka; Aki	Saitō; Uzaki	3:42
8.	"Hong Kong"			4:$0
9.	"Sanhyakurokujūgo-ho no March (Live Ongende wa Arimasen)"	Hoshino	Yoneyama	2:55
10.	"New Season '90"	HIRO		1:42
11.	"Overheat Night"	Ijichi		1:03
12.	"Alone"		Yasuda	1:17
13.	"Michi"		Yasuda	0:43
14.	"The Stress"			1:43
15.	"Get Smile"	Ijichi	Shima	3:20
16.	"Benkyō no Uta"			4:32
17.	"Kono Machi"			4:33
Total length:				48:29

Disc 2
No.	Title	Lyrics	Music	Length
1.	"17-sai"	Arima	Tsutsumi	4:50
2.	"Sonogo no Watashi [Moritaka Connection]"			3:50
3.	"Funky Monkey Baby"	Ōkura	Yazawa	4:18
4.	"Yoru no Entotsu"	Naoe	Naoe	4:43
5.	"Teriyaki Burger"			5:04
6.	"The Busters Blues"			4:29
7.	"The Mi-ha"			4:40
8.	"Ame (Rock Version)"		Matsuura	6:16
9.	"Mite"			4:57
Total length:				43:11

== Personnel ==
- Chisato Moritaka – vocals, tambourine
- The Janet Jacksons

- Yasuaki Maejima – keyboards
- Shin Kono – keyboards, guitar
- Hiroyoshi Matsuo – guitar
- Masafumi Yokoyama – bass
- Makoto "George" Yoshiwara – drums

== Charts ==
Chart (2014)	Peak position
Blu-Ray Disc Chart (Oricon)	13
DVD Chart (Oricon)	83
