= The Best Selection of First Moritaka 1987–1993 =

Compilation album by Chisato Moritaka
- Released: February 15, 1999
- Recorded: 1987–1993
- Genre: J-pop; dance-pop; pop rock
- Length: 90:50
- Language: Japanese
- Label: WEA Japan
- Producer: Yukio Seto

Chisato Moritaka chronology
Sava Sava (1998)	The Best Selection of First Moritaka 1987–1993 (1999)	Mix Age (1999)

The Best Selection of First Moritaka 1987–1993 is a compilation album by Japanese singer-songwriter Chisato Moritaka, released on February 15, 1999. The album covers Moritaka's singles from 1987 to 1993. It was released prior to her marriage to actor Yōsuke Eguchi on June 3 and her subsequent retirement from the music industry.

The album peaked at No. 6 on Oricon's albums chart and sold over 74,000 copies.

== Track listing ==
All lyrics are written by Chisato Moritaka, except where indicated; all music is composed and arranged by Hideo Saitō, except where indicated.

Disc 1
No.	Title	Lyrics	Music	Arrangement	Length
1.	"New Season"	HIRO			4:43
2.	"Overheat Night" (Ōbāhīto Naito (オーバーヒート・ナイト))	Hiromasa Ijichi			4:57
3.	"Get Smile"	Ijichi	Ken Shima		4:19
4.	"The Mi-ha (Special Mi-ha Mix)" (Za Mīhā (Supesharu Mīhā Mikkusu) (ザ・ミーハー (スペシャル･ミーハー・ミックス)))				5:55
5.	"Alone" (Arōn (アローン))		Shinji Yasuda	Yasuda	4:24
6.	"The Stress -Stress Chūkintō Version-" (Za Sutoresu -Sutoresu Chūkintō Bājon- (ザ・ストレス -ストレス 中近東バージョン-; "The Stress -Stress Middle East Version-"))				4:53
7.	"17-sai" (Jūnana-sai (17才; "17 Years Old"))	Mieko Arima	Kyōhei Tsutsumi		4:55
8.	"Daite (Las Vegas Version)" (Daite (Rasu Begasu Vājon) (だいて (ラスベガス・ヴァージョン); "Hold Me (Las Vegas Version)"))		Yuichi Takahashi	Takahashi	4:59
9.	"Michi" ((道; "Road"))		Yasuda		4:55
10.	"Seishun" ((青春; "Youth"))				4:28
Total length:					48:32

Disc 2
No.	Title	Music	Arrangement	Length
1.	"Kusai Mono ni wa Futa wo Shiro!!" ((臭いものにはフタをしろ!!; "Shut Your Stinking Trap!!"))			2:44
2.	"Ame" ((雨; "Rain"))	Seiji Matsuura		4:31
3.	"Benkyō no Uta" ((勉強の歌; "Study Song"))			4:42
4.	"Hachigatsu no Koi" ((八月の恋; "Love in August"))	Tsutsumi		4:13
5.	"Fight!!" (Faito!! (ファイト!!))	Takahashi	Takahashi	5:00
6.	"Concert no Yoru" (Konsāto no Yoru (コンサートの夜; "Concert Night"))			4:49
7.	"Watashi ga Obasan ni Natte mo (Single Version)" (Watashi ga Obasan ni Natte mo (Shinguru Vājon) (私がオバさんになっても (シングル・ヴァージョン); "Even If I Become an Old Lady (Single Version)"))			4:17
8.	"Watarasebashi" ((渡良瀬橋; "Watarase Bridge"))			3:46
9.	"Watashi no Natsu" ((私の夏; "My Summer"))			4:20
10.	"Hae Otoko (Single Version)" (Hae Otoko (Shinguru Vājon) (ハエ男 (シングル・ヴァージョン); "Fly Man (Single Version)"))	Moritaka		3:52
Total length:				42:18

== Charts ==
Chart (1999)	Peak position
Japanese Albums (Oricon)	6
