= Let's Go Go! Tour 2024.12.3 at Zepp DiverCity =

Video by Chisato Moritaka
- Released: March 26, 2025
- Recorded: December 3, 2024
- Venue: Zepp DiverCity, Odaiba, Tokyo, Japan
- Language: Japanese
- Label: Warner Music Japan
- Producer: Yukio Seto

Chisato Moritaka chronology
Kondo wa More Better yo! 2023–24 (2024)	Let's Go Go! Tour 2024.12.3 at Zepp DiverCity (2025)	2025 Chisato Moritaka Concert Tour: Anata mo Watashi mo Fight!! (2026)

Music video
- Official trailer on YouTube

Let's Go Go! Tour 2024.12.3 at Zepp DiverCity (『レッツ・ゴォーゴォー！ツアー』2024.12.3 at Zepp DiverCity) is a live video by Japanese singer-songwriter Chisato Moritaka. Recorded live at Zepp DiverCity in Odaiba, Tokyo on December 3, 2024, the video was released on March 26, 2025, by Warner Music Japan. The video is offered on Blu-ray and DVD formats, plus limited edition releases containing two audio CD versions of the concert, a photo booklet, and an acrylic stand.

The video peaked at No. 15 on Oricon's DVD chart.

== Track listing ==
All lyrics are written by Chisato Moritaka, except where indicated; all music is composed by Hideo Saitō, except where indicated.

Blu-ray/DVD disc 1
No.	Title	Lyrics	Music	Length
1.	"Overheat Night (オーバーヒート・ナイト, Ōbāhīto Naito)"	Hiromasa Ijichi
2.	"A-kun no Higeki (A君の悲劇; "The Tragedy of Boy A")"
3.	"Kondo Watashi Doko ka Tsurete itte Kudasai yo (今度私どこか連れていって下さいよ; "Take Me Out Somewhere Next Time")"
4.	"Jin Jin Jingle Bell (ジン ジン ジングルベル, Jin Jin Jinguru Beru)"		Yuichi Takahashi
5.	"Snow Again"		Takahashi
6.	"Misaki (岬; "Cape")"
7.	"Fight!! (ファイト！！, Faito!!)" (2024 Zepp Ver.)		Takahashi
8.	"Daite (Las Vegas Version) (だいて (ラスベガス・ヴァージョン); "Hold Me (Las Vegas Version)")" (Uses some footage from the Zepp Namba show)		Takahashi
9.	"Zoku Aru OL no Seishun ~ A-ko no Baai~ (続・あるOLの青春～A子の場合～; "A Certain Young Office Lady ~ In the Case of Child A, Continued")"
10.	"Nozokanaide (Self-Cover Ver.) (のぞかないで (セルフカバー Ver.); "Don't Look (Self-Cover Ver.))"
11.	"Watarasebashi (渡良瀬橋; "Watarase Bridge")"
12.	"Ame (Rock Version) (雨 (ロック・ヴァージョン); "Rain" (Rock Version))"		Seiji Matsuura
13.	"Waka Sugita Koi (若すぎた恋; "Too Young to Fall in Love")" (2024 Zepp Ver.)		Takahashi
14.	"Teriyaki Burger (テリヤキ・バーガー, Teriyaki Bāgā)"
15.	"Kibun Sōkai (January 2023 Zepp Ver.) (気分爽快(2023 1月Zepp Ver.); "Refreshing (January 2023 Zepp Ver.)")"		Kenichi Kurosawa
16.	"17-sai (17才, Jūnana-sai; "17 Years Old")" (2024 Zepp Ver.)	Mieko Arima	Kyōhei Tsutsumi
17.	"Watashi ga Obasan ni Natte mo (私がオバさんになっても; "Even If I Become an Old Lady")"
18.	"Yoru no Entotsu (夜の煙突; "Night Chimney")"	Masataro Naoe	Naoe
19.	"Get Smile"	Ijichi	Ken Shima
20.	"Michi (道; "Road")" (Encore)		Shinji Yasuda
21.	"Kono Machi (この街; "This Town")" (Encore)
22.	"Mite (見て; "Look")" (Double Encore)

Blu-ray bonus track/DVD disc 2
No.	Title	Length
1.	"Documentary Footage (ドキュメント映像, Dokyumento Eizō)"

CD 1
No.	Title	Lyrics	Music	Length
1.	"Overheat Night"	Ijichi		4:43
2.	"A-kun no Higeki"			4:32
3.	"Kondo Watashi Doko ka Tsurete itte Kudasai yo"			3:36
4.	"Jin Jin Jingle Bell"		Takahashi	3:44
5.	"Snow Again"		Takahashi	4:22
6.	"Misaki"			5:11
7.	"Fight!!" (2024 Zepp Ver.)		Takahashi	4:54
8.	"Daite (Las Vegas Version)"		Takahashi	5:32
9.	"Zoku Aru OL no Seishun ~ A-ko no Baai~"			4:42
10.	"Nozokanaide (Self-Cover Ver.)"			4:30
Total length:				45:42

CD 2
No.	Title	Lyrics	Music	Length
1.	"Watarasebashi"			3:40
2.	"Ame (Rock Version)"		Matsuura	5:00
3.	"Waka Sugita Koi" (2024 Zepp Ver.)		Takahashi	4:29
4.	"Teriyaki Burger"			5:11
5.	"Kibun Sokai (January 2023 Zepp Ver.)"		Kurosawa	3:57
6.	"17-sai" (2024 Zepp Ver.)	Arima	Tsutsumi	5:00
7.	"Watashi ga Obasan ni Natte mo"			4:39
8.	"Yoru no Entotsu"	Naoe	Naoe	5:07
9.	"Get Smile"	Ijichi	Shima	5:52
10.	"Michi"		Yasuda	4:51
11.	"Kono Machi"			4:43
12.	"Mite"			5:04
Total length:				57:28

== Personnel ==
- Chisato Moritaka – vocals
- The White Queen

- Yuichi Takahashi – guitar
- Maria Suzuki – guitar
- Yu Yamagami – keyboards
- Masafumi Yokoyama – bass
- Akira Sakamoto – drums

== Charts ==
Chart (2025)	Peak position
DVD Chart (Oricon)	15
