= Kono Machi Tour 2019 =

Video by Chisato Moritaka
- Released: August 26, 2020
- Recorded: December 8, 2019
- Venue: Kumamoto-jō Hall; Kumamoto, Japan
- Length: 129 minutes
- Language: Japanese
- Label: Warner Music Japan
- Producer: Yukio Seto

Chisato Moritaka chronology
30th Anniversary Final Project "The Singles" Day 1・Day 2 Live 2018 Complete Version (2019)	Kono Machi Tour 2019 (2020)	Chisato Moritaka Live 2020 (2021)

Music video
- Kono Machi Tour 2019 trailer on YouTube

Kono Machi Tour 2019 (「この街」TOUR 2019) is a live video by Japanese singer-songwriter Chisato Moritaka. Recorded live at the Kumamoto-jō Hall in Kumamoto on December 8, 2019, the video was released on August 26, 2020, by Warner Music Japan on Blu-ray and DVD formats. A limited edition box set includes a photobook, two audio CDs of the concert, and a bonus documentary video with Moritaka visiting famous tourist attractions during the tour. In addition, a WIZY exclusive pre-order set includes a bonus two-CD audio recording of the tour's final show at the Sendai Sun Plaza Hall on December 21, 2019. The Sendai show was streamed exclusively in Japan on Amazon Music and Deezer on April 23, 2021, featuring uncut MC segments and compatibility with Sony 360 Reality Audio.

The video was shot during the final leg of Moritaka's Kono Machi Tour 2019, which was her first national tour in 21 years. It was also her first performance in her hometown of Kumamoto in 26 years. In addition, the video features a special guest appearance by Kumamon.

Kono Machi Tour 2019 peaked at No. 12 on Oricon's Blu-ray and DVD charts.

== Track listing ==
All lyrics are written by Chisato Moritaka, except where indicated; all music is composed by Hideo Saitō, except where indicated.

Blu-ray
No.	Title	Lyrics	Music	Length
1.	"New Season"	HIRO
2.	"The Mi-ha" (Za Mīhā (ザ・ミーハー))
3.	"Rock 'n' Roll Kenchōshozaichi" (Rokkunrōru Kenchōshozaichi (ロックンロール県庁所在地; "Rock 'n' Roll Prefectural Government"))		Moritaka
4.	"Benkyō no Uta" ((勉強の歌; "Study Song"))
5.	"Kaze ni Fukarete" ((風に吹かれて; "Blowing in the Wind"))
6.	"Te wo Tatakō" ((手をたたこう; "Clap Your Hands"))		Moritaka
7.	"Dekiru Desho!!" ((出来るでしょ!!; "You Can Do It!!"))		Hiromasa Ijichi
8.	"The Stress -Stress Chūkintō Version-" (Za Sutoresu -Sutoresu Chūkintō Bājon- (ザ・ストレス -ストレス 中近東バージョン-; "The Stress -Stress Middle East Version-"))
9.	"17-sai" (Jūnana-sai (17才; "17 Years Old"))	Mieko Arima	Kyōhei Tsutsumi
10.	"Watashi ga Obasan ni Natte mo" ((私がオバさんになっても; "Even If I Become an Old Lady"))
11.	"Ame" ((雨; "Rain"))		Seiji Matsuura
12.	"Don't Stop the Music"	tofubeats	tofubeats
13.	"La La Sunshine" (Ra Ra Sanshain (ララ サンシャイン))		Ijichi
14.	"Watarasebashi" ((渡良瀬橋; "Watarase Bridge"))
15.	"Kusai Mono ni wa Futa wo Shiro!!" ((臭いものにはフタをしろ!!; "Shut Your Stinking Trap!!"))
16.	"Kibun Sōkai" ((気分爽快; "Refreshing"))		Kenichi Kurosawa
17.	"Yoru no Entotsu" ((夜の煙突; "Night Chimney"))	Masataro Naoe	Naoe
18.	"Teriyaki Burger" (Teriyaki Bāgā (テリヤキ・バーガー))
19.	"Kono Machi" ((この街; "This Town"))
20.	"Concert no Yoru" (Konsāto no Yoru (コンサートの夜; "Concert Night"))

Bonus track/DVD Disc 2

Saitama Sayama Civic Center Great Hall (January 26)
No.	Title	Music	Length
1.	"The Mi-ha"
2.	"La La Sunshine"	Ijichi
3.	"Kibun Sōkai"	Kurosawa
4.	"Kono Machi"

Tokyo Tamashin RISURU Hall (September 7)
No.	Title	Lyrics	Music	Length
1.	"New Season"	HIRO
2.	"Rock 'n' Roll Kenchōshozaichi"		Moritaka
3.	"Watashi no Natsu"
4.	"Kaze ni Fukarete"
5.	"The Stress"
6.	"Watashi ga Obasan ni Natte mo"

Hitomi Memorial Hall (October 5)
No.	Title	Music	Length
1.	"Tō ga Tatsu" ((薹が立つ; "Past Her Prime"))	Ijichi
2.	"Mitsuketa Saifu" ((見つけたサイフ; "The Wallet I Found"))
3.	"Hijitsuryokuha Sengen" ((非実力派宣言; "Non-Proficiency Declaration"))
4.	"Futari wa Koibito" ((二人は恋人; lit. "We Are a Pair of Lovers"))
5.	"Uchi ni Kagitte Sonna Koto wa Nai Hazu" ((うちにかぎってそんなことはないはず; "That Shouldn't Be the Case"))	Naoe

Saitama Kumagaya Culture Concert Hall "Sakura Mate" (December 1)
No.	Title	Lyrics	Music	Length
1.	"Kusai Mono ni wa Futa wo Shiro!"
2.	"Get Smile"	Ijichi	Ken Shima

Limited Edition Disc (Blu-ray Disc 2/DVD Disc 3)

No.	Title	Length
1.	"Kono Machi Tour 2019 Documentary Film" ((「この街」TOUR 2019ドキュメンタリー映像))

CD

Disc 1
No.	Title	Lyrics	Music	Length
1.	"New Season"	HIRO		6:13
2.	"The Mi-ha"			4:46
3.	"Rock 'n' Roll Kenchōshozaichi"		Moritaka	2:31
4.	"Benkyō no Uta"			4:38
5.	"Kaze ni Fukarete"			4:39
6.	"Te wo Tatakō"		Moritaka	3:43
7.	"Dekiru Desho!!"		Ijichi	4:32
8.	"The Stress -Stress Chūkintō Version-"			4:50
9.	"17-sai"	Arima	Tsutsumi	4:52
10.	"Watashi ga Obasan ni Natte mo"			4:42
Total length:				45:30

Disc 2
No.	Title	Lyrics	Music	Length
1.	"Ame"		Matsuura	4:54
2.	"Don't Stop the Music"	tofubeats	tofubeats	4:24
3.	"La La Sunshine"		Ijichi	4:49
4.	"Watarasebashi"			3:44
5.	"Kusai Mono ni wa Futa wo Shiro!!"			2:47
6.	"Kibun Sōkai"		Kurosawa	3:55
7.	"Yoru no Entotsu"	Naoe	Naoe	5:26
8.	"Teriyaki Burger"			5:14
9.	"Kono Machi"			4:36
10.	"Concert no Yoru"			4:58
Total length:				44:50

Digital

Kono Machi Tour 2019 (Live at Sendai Sun Plaza Hall, 2019.12.21)
No.	Title	Lyrics	Music	Length
1.	"To ga Tatsu"		Ijichi
2.	"The Mi-ha"
3.	"Mitsuketa Saifu"
4.	"Benkyō no Uta"
5.	"Hijitsuryokuha Sengen"
6.	"Te wo Tatakō"		Moritaka
7.	"Dekiru Desho!!"		Ijichi
8.	"The Stress -Stress Chūkintō Version-"
9.	"17-sai"	Arima	Tsutsumi
10.	"Watashi ga Obasan ni Natte mo"
11.	"Ame"		Matsuura
12.	"Don't Stop the Music"	tofubeats	tofubeats
13.	"La La Sunshine"		Ijichi
14.	"Watarasebashi"
15.	"Kusai Mono ni wa Futa wo Shiro!!"
16.	"Kibun Sōkai"		Kurosawa
17.	"Yoru no Entotsu"	Naoe	Naoe
18.	"Teriyaki Burger"
19.	"Kono Machi (Encore 1)"
20.	"Concert no Yoru (Encore 2)"

== Personnel ==
- Chisato Moritaka – vocals, rhythm guitar, drums, alto recorder
- The White Queen

- Yuichi Takahashi – guitar
- Maria Suzuki – guitar
- Yu Yamagami – keyboards
- Masafumi Yokoyama – bass
- Akira Sakamoto – drums

== Charts ==
Chart (2020)	Peak position
Blu-Ray Disc Chart (Oricon)	12
DVD Chart (Oricon)	12
