= Chisato Moritaka Live 2020 =

Video by Chisato Moritaka
- Released: July 28, 2021
- Recorded: July 25, 2020 (disc 1); October 15, 2020 (disc 2); December 8, 2020 (disc 3)
- Venues: Cotton Club Tokyo (disc 1); Zepp DiverCity (disc 2); Zepp Haneda (disc 3)
- Length: 72 minutes (disc 1); 139 minutes (disc 2); 95 minutes (disc 3)
- Language: Japanese
- Label: Up-Front Works
- Producer: Yukio Seto

Chisato Moritaka chronology
Kono Machi Tour 2019 (2020)	Chisato Moritaka Live 2020 (2021)	Live Rock Alive Complete (2022)

Chisato Moritaka Live 2020 (森高千里ライブ2020, Moritaka Chisato Raibu 2020) is a live video by Japanese singer-songwriter Chisato Moritaka, released on July 28, 2021, by Up-Front Works exclusively on Blu-ray. It is a compilation of three online concerts she hosted after her Kono Machi Tour 2020 was postponed due to the COVID-19 pandemic.

The video peaked at No. 35 on Oricon's Blu-ray chart.

== Overview ==
Disc 1 is "Distribution Debut! First Time! The 10 Best Moritaka Songs Chosen by Fans !! ~ Chisato Moritaka Singing with Excitement! ~" (配信デビュー！初！ファンが選ぶ森高ソングベスト10!! 〜森高千里歌唱にてドキドキの発表！〜, Haishin Debyū! Hatsu! Fan ga Erabu Moritaka Songu Besuto 10! ! 〜 Moritaka Chisato Kashō nite Dokidoki no Happyō!〜), hosted on July 25, 2020, at an empty Cotton Club Tokyo due to COVID-19 protocols. The concert features Moritaka's top 10 songs, as voted by her fans online.

Disc 2 is "Chisato Moritaka Live 2020 ~Selected by Nobuaki Onuki~ The Profound Top 20 Best Songs." (森高千里ライブ2020 音楽評論家・小貫信昭が選ぶ “深淵なる名曲” ベスト20, Moritaka Chisato Raibu 2020 Ongaku Hyōron-ka Onuki Nobuaki ga Erabu "Shin'en'naru Meikyoku" Besuto 20), hosted on October 15, 2020, at Zepp DiverCity, with an audience of 65 in attendance. The concert features live performances of 20 of Moritaka's songs selected by music critic Nobuaki Onuki, plus her covers of Shonen Knife's "Banana Chips" and Negoto's "Sharp"

Disc 3 is "Chisato Moritaka Live 2020 Final: My Favorites, My Songs which Chisato Moritaka Didn't Pick on the First Two Live Streaming Shows" (今度は森高千里が選ぶ1回目2回目のライブ配信では歌わなかったマイフェイバリット・マイソングス～森高千里ライブ2020 FINAL, Kondo wa Moritaka Chisato ga Erabu 1-kai-me 2-kai-me no Raibu Haishinde wa Utawanakatta Mai Feibaritto Mai Songusu ~ Moritaka Chisato Raibu 2020 Final), hosted on December 8, 2020, at Zepp Haneda, with an audience of 550 in attendance. The concert features Moritaka's personal selection of 16 songs she did not perform in the two previous shows, plus her cover of Capsule's "More More More".

== Track listing ==
All lyrics are written by Chisato Moritaka, except where indicated.

Disc 1 - Distribution Debut! First Time! The 10 Best Moritaka Songs Chosen by Fans !! ~ Chisato Moritaka Singing with Excitement! ~
No.	Title	Lyrics	Music	Length
1.	"New Season"	HIRO	Hideo Saitō
2.	"Futari wa Koibito" ((二人は恋人; "We Are a Pair of Lovers"))		Saitō
3.	"Watashi no Natsu" ((私の夏; "My Summer"))		Saitō
4.	"Kibun Sōkai" ((気分爽快; "Refreshing"))		Kenichi Kurosawa
5.	"Concert no Yoru" (Konsāto no Yoru (コンサートの夜; "Concert Night"))		Saitō
6.	"17-sai" (Jūnana-sai (17才; "17 Years Old"))	Mieko Arima	Kyōhei Tsutsumi
7.	"Ame" ((雨; "Rain"))		Seiji Matsuura
8.	"Watarasebashi" ((渡良瀬橋; "Watarase Bridge"))		Saitō
9.	"Watashi ga Obasan ni Natte mo" ((私がオバさんになっても; "Even If I Become an Old Lady"))		Saitō
10.	"Kono Machi" ((この街; "This Town"))		Saitō

Disc 2 - Chisato Moritaka Live 2020 ~Selected by Nobuaki Onuki~ The Profound Top 20 Best Songs.
No.	Title	Lyrics	Music	Length
1.	"Banana Chips (Shonen Knife cover)" (Banana Chippusu (バナナチップス))	Naoko Yamano	Yamano
2.	"Sharp (Negoto cover)" ((sharp ♯))	Sachiko Aoyama	Aoyama; Mizuki Masuda
3.	"Wakareta Onna" ((別れた女; "A Parting Woman"))		Saitō
4.	"Bassari Yatte yo" ((ばっさりやってよ; "Just Do It"))		Yuichi Takahashi
5.	"Michi" ((道; "Road"))		Shinji Yasuda
6.	"Fight!!" (Faito!! (ファイト！！))		Takahashi
7.	"Mitsuketa Saifu" ((見つけたサイフ; "The Wallet I Found"))		Saitō
8.	"Bottoshite Miyou" ((ボーッとしてみよう; "Let's Do It"))		Moritaka
9.	"Uchi ni Kagitte Sonna Koto wa Nai Hazu" ((うちにかぎってそんなことはないはず; "That Shouldn't Be the Case"))		Masataro Naoe
10.	"Snow Again"		Takahashi
11.	"Sweet Candy"		Takahashi
12.	"Obasan" ((叔母さん; "Aunt"))		Ijichi
13.	"Nagasarete..." ((流されて・・・; "Washed Away..."))		Takahashi
14.	"I Love You"		Ijichi
15.	"Tampopo no Tane" ((たんぽぽの種; "Dandelion Seeds"))		Shikao Suga
16.	"Ichido Asobi ni Kite yo" ((一度遊びに来てよ; "Come Out and Play"))		Saitō
17.	"Mukashi no Hito wa..." ((むかしの人は…; "Once Upon a Time..."))		Moritaka
18.	"Zaru de Mizu kumu Koigokoro" ((ザルで水くむ恋心; "Love Feeling in a Colander"))		COIL
19.	"To ga Tatsu" ((薹が立つ; "Past Her Prime"))		Ijichi
20.	"Tsumetai Tsuki" ((冷たい月; "Cold Moon"))		Takahashi
21.	"Watashi no Yō ni" ((私のように; "Like Me"))		Shin Kono
22.	"Teriyaki Burger" (Teriyaki Bāgā (テリヤキ・バーガー))		Saitō

Disc 3 - Chisato Moritaka Live 2020 Final: My Favorites, My Songs which Chisato Moritaka Didn't Pick on the First Two Live Streaming Shows
No.	Title	Lyrics	Music	Length
1.	"More More More (Capsule cover)"	Yasutaka Nakata	Nakata
2.	"Kondo Watashi Doko ka Tsurete itte Kudasai yo" ((今度私どこか連れていって下さいよ; "Take Me Out Somewhere Next Time"))		Saitō
3.	"Jimi na Onna" ((地味な女; "A Sober Woman"))		Saitō
4.	"Shintō Mekkyakusureba Himomata Suzushi" ((心頭滅却すれば火もまた涼し; "If You Destroy Your Heart, the Fire Will Cool Again"))		Takahashi
5.	"Oni Taiji" ((鬼たいじ; "Demon Hunting"))		Saitō
6.	"My Anniversary" (Mai Anibāsarī (マイ・アニバーサリー))		Takahashi
7.	"Tereya" ((照れ屋; "Shy"))		Takahashi
8.	"Alone" (Arōn (アローン))		Yasuda
9.	"Ame Nochi Hare" ((雨のち晴れ; "Rain, Then Sun"))		Saitō
10.	"Hare" ((晴れ; "Sunny"))		Takahashi
11.	"Sayonara Watashi no Koi" ((さよなら私の恋; "Goodbye, My Love"))		Saitō
12.	"Guitar" (Gitā (ギター))		Saitō
13.	"Wasuremono" ((忘れ物; "Lost Item"))		Saitō
14.	"Yoru no Entotsu" ((夜の煙突; "Night Chimney"))	Naoe	Naoe
15.	"Hae Otoko" ((ハエ男; "Fly Man"))		Moritaka
16.	"Anata wa Ninki Mono" ((あなたは人気者; "You Are a Popular Person"))		Kōno
17.	"Kyō kara" ((今日から; "Starting Today"))		Takahashi

== Personnel ==
- Chisato Moritaka – vocals, rhythm guitar, alto recorder

Discs 2–3

- The White Queen

- Yuichi Takahashi – guitar
- Maria Suzuki – guitar
- Yu Yamagami – keyboards
- Masafumi Yokoyama – bass
- Akira Sakamoto – drums

== Charts ==
Chart (2021)	Peak position
Japanese Blu-ray Disc Chart (Oricon)	35
