= Mite (album) =

Album by Chisato Moritaka

Studio album by Chisato Moritaka
- Released: November 17, 1988
- Recorded: 1988
- Studio: Warner-Pioneer Studio; Sound City Studio
- Length: 42:32
- Language: Japanese
- Label: Warner Pioneer
- Producer: Yukio Seto; Hideo Saitō

Chisato Moritaka chronology
Romantic (1988)	Mite (1988)	Hijitsuryokuha Sengen (1989)

Singles from Mite
- 1. "Alone" Released: October 25, 1988; 2. "The Stress" Released: February 25, 1989

Mite (見て; Look) is the third studio album by Japanese singer/songwriter Chisato Moritaka, released on November 17, 1988 by Warner Pioneer. After her second album Mi-ha and her EP Romantic, Moritaka wrote the lyrics for the majority of the songs in this album; a trend that continued for the rest of her career.

The album peaked at No. 5 on Oricon's albums chart and sold over 66,000 copies, making it Moritaka's first top-five album. It was also her last album to be issued on LP.

== Track listing ==
All lyrics are written by Chisato Moritaka, except where indicated; all music is composed and arranged by Hideo Saitō, except where indicated.

Side A
No.	Title	Lyrics	Music	Arrangement	Length
1.	"Omoshiroi (Moritaka Connection)" (Omoshiroi (Moritaka Konekushon) (おもしろい（森高コネクション）; "Interesting (Moritaka Connection)"))				7:17
2.	"Wakareta Onna" ((別れた女; "A Parting Woman"))				4:53
3.	"Watashi ga Hen?" ((私が変?; "Am I Strange?"))	Ekisu Suzuki	Takumi Yamamoto	Yamamoto	4:11
4.	"Alone" (Arōn (アローン))		Shinji Yasuda	Yasuda	4:31

Side B
No.	Title	Lyrics	Music	Arrangement	Length
1.	"Stress" (Sutoresu (ストレス))				4:15
2.	"Deta Gari" ((出たがり; "I Want to Go Out"))				4:14
3.	"Modorenai Natsu" ((戻れない夏; "The Summer That Can't Return"))	Kanon Kuwa	Ken Shima	Shima	4:47
4.	"Mite" ((見て; "Look"))				4:39
5.	"Let Me Go"	Hiromasa Ijichi; Moritaka	Yasuda	Yamamoto	4:03

== Personnel ==
- Chisato Moritaka – vocals
- Hideo Saitō – guitar, drum and synthesizer programming (all tracks except where indicated)
- Takumi Yamamoto – guitar, drum programming (A3, B5)
- Tomoaki Arima – synthesizer programming (A3, B5)
- Naoki Suzuki – synthesizer programming (A3, A4, B3, B5)
- Keiji Toriyama – synthesizer programming (B3)
- Ken Shima – keyboards (B3)
- Kenji Takamizu – bass (B3)
- Shingo Kanno – percussion (B3)
- Shinji Yasuda – backing vocals (A3, A4, B5)

== Charts ==
Chart (1988)	Peak position
Japanese Albums (Oricon)	5

== Video album ==
Mite

Video by Chisato Moritaka
- Released: November 28, 1988 (LD); December 10, 1988 (VHS)
- Genre: J-pop; pop rock; dance-pop
- Language: Japanese
- Label: Warner Pioneer

Chisato Moritaka chronology
Overheat Night (1988)	Mite (1988)	The Stress (1988)

The video album for Mite was released on 8" LaserDisc on November 28, 1988 and on VHS on December 10, 1988. Its contents were compiled in the 2000 DVD Chisato Moritaka DVD Collection No. 5: Mite/The Stress/17-sai.

=== Track listing ===
No.	Title	Lyrics	Music	Arrangement	Length
1.	"New Season"	HIRO	Saitō	Saitō
2.	"The Mi-ha" (Za Mīhā (ザ・ミーハー))	Moritaka	Saitō	Saitō
3.	"Alone"	Moritaka	Yasuda	Yasuda

== See also ==
- 1988 in Japanese music
