= Moritaka Land =

Remix album by Chisato Moritaka
- Released: December 10, 1989
- Recorded: 1989
- Studio: Saito House; Warner-Pioneer Studio
- Length: 54:53
- Language: Japanese
- Label: Warner Pioneer
- Producer: Yukio Seto; Hideo Saitō

Chisato Moritaka chronology
Hijitsuryokuha Sengen (1989)	Moritaka Land (1989)	Kokon Tozai (1990)

Singles from Moritaka Land
- 1. "Michi/Seishun" Released: January 25, 1990

Alternative cover
- Limited edition inner cover

Moritaka Land (森高ランド, Moritaka Rando) is a remix album by Japanese singer-songwriter Chisato Moritaka, released on December 10, 1989, by Warner Pioneer. The album includes two new tracks: "Uwasa" and "Michi", plus songs re-recorded by Moritaka and remixed by Hideo Saitō. A limited edition release included a 60-page photo book.

The album peaked at No. 2 on Oricon's albums chart and sold over 313,000 copies. It was also Moritaka's first album to be certified Platinum by the RIAJ.

== Track listing ==
All music is composed and arranged by Hideo Saitō, except where indicated.

No.	Title	Lyrics	Music	Arrangement	Length
1.	"Uwasa" ((うわさ; "Rumor"))	Chisato Moritaka			5:04
2.	"Mi-Ha" (Mīhā (ミーハー))	Moritaka			5:02
3.	"Stress" (Sutoresu (ストレス))	Moritaka			3:48
4.	"Alone" (Arōn (アローン))	Moritaka	Shinji Yasuda	Yasuda	4:20
5.	"Get Smile"	Hiromasa Ijichi	Ken Shima		4:37
6.	"Yume no Owari" ((夢の終り; "The End of a Dream"))	Shingo Kanno			4:19
7.	"Overheat Night" (Ōbāhīto Naito (オーバーヒート・ナイト))	Ijichi			3:48
8.	"17-sai" (Jūnana-sai (17才; "17 Years Old"))	Mieko Arima	Kyōhei Tsutsumi		4:45
9.	"Let Me Go"	Ijichi; Moritaka	Yasuda		3:56
10.	"Good-Bye Season"	Kanon Kuwa	Takumi Yamamoto		4:01
11.	"Michi" ((道; "Road"))	Moritaka	Yasuda		4:52
12.	"New Season"	HIRO			6:20
Total length:					54:53

== Personnel ==
- Chisato Moritaka – vocals
- Hideo Saitō – all instruments, programming, backing vocals
- Manaho Saitō – backing vocals (8, 12)

== Charts ==
Chart (1989)	Peak position
Japanese Albums (Oricon)	2

== Certification ==
Region	Certification	Certified units/sales
Japan (RIAJ)	Platinum	400,000^{^}
^{^} Shipments figures based on certification alone.

== See also ==
- 1989 in Japanese music
