= Mi-ha =

Album by Chisato Moritaka

Studio album by Chisato Moritaka
- Released: March 25, 1988
- Recorded: 1987–1988
- Studio: Warner-Pioneer Studio; Sound City Studio
- Length: 48:34
- Language: Japanese
- Label: Warner Pioneer
- Producer: Yukio Seto

Chisato Moritaka chronology
New Season (1987)	Mi-ha (1988)	Romantic (1988)

Singles from Mi-ha
- 1. "Overheat Night" Released: October 25, 1987; 2. "Get Smile" Released: February 25, 1988; 3. "The Mi-ha" Released: April 25, 1988

Mi-ha (ミーハー, Mīhā) is the second studio album by Japanese singer/songwriter Chisato Moritaka, released on March 25, 1988, by Warner Pioneer. In contrast to the city pop-oriented debut album New Season, Mi-ha is a mix of rock and pop tunes, with its tagline: "Rock? Pop? Whichever is fine." (ロック?ポップス?どっちでもいいや, "Rokku? Poppusu? Dotchi demo ī ya"). The album also marked Moritaka's songwriting debut with the title track.

The album peaked at No. 17 on Oricon's albums chart and sold over 72,000 copies.

== Track listing ==
All lyrics are written by Hiromasa Ijichi, except where indicated; all music is composed and arranged by Hideo Saitō, except where indicated.

Side A
No.	Title	Lyrics	Music	Arrangement	Length
1.	"Overheat Night (Album Version)" (Ōbāhīto Naito (オーバーヒート・ナイト (Album Version)))				5:10
2.	"Yokohama One Night"				4:41
3.	"Good-Bye Season"	Kanon Kuwa	Takumi Yamamoto	Yamamoto	4:20
4.	"Can't Say Good-Bye"				4:30
5.	"Pi-a-no"	Kuwa	Ken Shima	Shima	4:52

Side B
No.	Title	Lyrics	Music	Arrangement	Length
1.	"47 Hard Nights"				4:57
2.	"Weekend Blue"				4:08
3.	"Kiss the Night"		Yamamoto	Yamamoto	5:28
4.	"Mi-ha" (Mīhā (ミーハー))	Chisato Moritaka			4:55
5.	"Get Smile"		Shima	Shima	5:30

== Personnel ==
- Chisato Moritaka – vocals, Fender Rhodes (A5), timbales (B4)
- Hideo Saitō – guitar, backing vocals, drum and synthesizer programming (all tracks except where indicated)
- Nobita Tsukada – keyboards, synthesizer programming (all tracks except where indicated)
- Ken Shima – keyboards, piano, backing vocals (A3, B5)
- Hatsuho Furukawa – keyboards (B3)
- Takayuki Negishi – synthesizer programming (A3, B5)
- Tomoaki Arima – synthesizer programming (A3, B3)
- Junro Satō – guitar (A3, B3)
- Chiharu Mikuzugi – bass (B3, B5)
- Reuben Tsujino – percussion (A1, B2)
- Shingo Kanno – congas (A1), güiro (A2), tambourine (B2)
- Jake H. Concepcion – tenor saxophone (A2–A3, B5)
- Misa Nakayama – backing vocals (A1, A2, B4)
- Nana – backing vocals (A3, B3)
- Takumi Yamamoto – backing vocals (B3)
- Yukari Fujio – backing vocals (A3, B3, B5)

== Charts ==
Chart (1988)	Peak position
Japanese Albums (Oricon)	17

== Video album ==
Mi-ha

Video by Chisato Moritaka
- Released: April 25, 1988
- Genre: J-pop; pop rock; dance-pop
- Language: Japanese
- Label: Warner Pioneer

Chisato Moritaka chronology
Get Smile - Live at Nippon Seinenkan (1988)	Mi-ha (1988)	Overheat Night (1988)

The video album for Mi-ha was released on CDV format on April 25, 1988.

=== Track listing ===
No.	Title	Lyrics	Music	Arrangement	Length
1.	"Yokohama One Night"	Ijichi	Saitō	Saitō
2.	"Good-Bye Season"	Kuwa	Yamamoto	Yamamoto
3.	"47 Hard Nights"	Ijichi	Saitō	Saitō
4.	"Mi-ha" (Mīhā (ミーハー))	Moritaka	Saitō	Saitō
5.	"Get Smile (Video Part)"	Ijichi	Shima	Shima

== See also ==
- 1988 in Japanese music
