= Romantic (EP) =

EP by Chisato Moritaka
- Released: July 10, 1988
- Recorded: 1988
- Studio: Warner-Pioneer Studios
- Genre: J-pop; pop rock; bossa nova
- Length: 20:33
- Language: Japanese; English
- Label: Warner Pioneer
- Producer: Yukio Seto

Chisato Moritaka chronology
Mi-ha (1988)	Romantic (1988)	Mite (1988)

Romantic (ロマンティック, Romantikku) is an EP by Japanese singer/songwriter Chisato Moritaka, released on July 10, 1988, by Warner Pioneer. The EP is themed around summer, headlined by Moritaka's cover of Dionne Warwick's "Do You Know the Way to San Jose". While the album is packaged in a standard 12 cm CD case, the disc itself is an 8 cm mini CD.

The album peaked at No. 22 on Oricon's albums chart and sold over 24,000 copies.

== Track listing ==
No.	Title	Lyrics	Music	Arrangement	Length
1.	"Do You Know the Way to San Jose" (San Hose e no Michi (サンホセへの道; "The Road to San Jose"))	Burt Bacharach; Hal David	Bacharach; David	Takumi Yamamoto	2:46
2.	"Romantic" (Romantikku (ロマンティック))	Chisato Moritaka	Ken Shima	Shima	4:44
3.	"Ano Hi no Photograph (Bossa Nova Version)" (Ano Hi no Fotogurafu (Bosa Noba Vājon) (あの日のフォトグラフ（ボサノバ・ヴァージョン）; "The Photograph of That Day (Bossa Nova Version)"))	Hiromasa Ijichi	Shima	Shima	4:03
4.	"Kaigan" ((海岸; "Coast"))	Makoto Ōishi	Yamamoto	Yamamoto	4:36
5.	"Shizuka na Umi" ((静かな夏; "A Quiet Summer"))	Kanon Kuwa	Yamamoto	Yamamoto	4:22

== Personnel ==
- Chisato Moritaka – vocals
- Takumi Yamamoto – vocals (1)
- Ken Shima – piano, keyboards, piano, backing vocals (1–3)
- Keiji Toriyama – synthesizer programming (2–3)
- Tomoaki Arima – synthesizer programming (4–5)
- Yukio Seto – guitar (3)
- Keiichi Ishibashu – bass (1)
- Kenji Takamizu – bass (2–3)
- Yuichi Togashiki – drums (1)
- Masahiro Yamazaki – drums (2–3)
- Shingo Kanno – percussion (2)
- Nana – backing vocals (4)

== Charts ==
Chart (1988)	Peak position
Japanese Albums (Oricon)	22
