= New Season =

New Season(s) may refer to:

- New Season (Chisato Moritaka album), 1987
- "New Season" (song), a 1987 song by Chisato Moritaka
- New Season (Kym album), 2007
- New Season (Donny and Marie Osmond album), 1976
- New Seasons (album), a 2007 album by The Sadies
- New Seasons Market, a grocery store with 22 locations in the Portland metropolitan area.

== See also ==
- The New Season, a 2006 album by Brotha Lynch Hung and MC Eiht
- "The New Season", a song by Clint Mansell from the 2010 Black Swan soundtrack
- New Seasons Market, an American west-coast grocery chain
