= Hijitsuryokuha Sengen =

Studio album by Chisato Moritaka
- Released: July 25, 1989
- Recorded: 1989
- Studio: Warner-Pioneer Studio; Sound City Studio; Saito House
- Length: 56:00
- Language: Japanese
- Label: Warner Pioneer
- Producer: Yukio Seto; Hideo Saitō

Chisato Moritaka chronology
Mite (1988)	Hijitsuryokuha Sengen (1989)	Moritaka Land (1989)

Singles from Hijitsuryokuha Sengen
- 1. "17-sai" Released: May 25, 1989; 2. "Daite (Las Vegas Version)" Released: September 25, 1989

Hijitsuryokuha Sengen (非実力派宣言; Non-Proficiency Declaration) is the fourth studio album by Japanese singer-songwriter Chisato Moritaka, released on July 25, 1989 by Warner Pioneer. It features two versions of Moritaka's cover of the 1971 Saori Minami song "17-sai". The album is themed around Moritaka's awareness of being an idol, with songs addressing her flaws, failed romances, and interactions with her fans.

The album peaked at No. 2 on Oricon's albums chart and sold over 216,000 copies. It was also Moritaka's first album to be certified Gold by the RIAJ.

== Track listing ==
All lyrics are written by Chisato Moritaka, except where indicated.

No.	Title	Lyrics	Music	Arrangement	Length
1.	"17-sai (Carnation Version)" (Jūnana-sai (Kānēshon Vājon) (17才（カーネーション・ヴァージョン）; "17 Years Old (Carnation Version)"))	Mieko Arima	Kyōhei Tsutsumi	Masataro Naoe	2:05
2.	"Korekkiri Bye Bye" (Korekkiri Bai Bai (これっきりバイバイ; "Final Bye Bye"))		Hideo Saitō	Saitō	4:54
3.	"Daite" ((だいて; "Hold Me"))		Yuichi Takahashi	Takahashi	4:54
4.	"Hijitsuryokuha Sengen" ((非実力派宣言; "Non-Proficiency Declaration"))		Saitō	Saitō	3:54
5.	"Kondo Watashi Doko ka Tsurete itte Kudasai yo" ((今度私どこか連れていって下さいよ; "Take Me Out Somewhere Next Time"))		Saitō	Saitō	3:44
6.	"Hadaka ni wa Naranai" ((はだかにはならない; "I Don't Get Naked"))		Naoe	Naoe	3:01
7.	"Watashi wa Onchi" ((私はおんち; "I'm Tone Deaf"))		Takahashi	Takahashi	3:52
8.	"Shirita Gari" ((しりたがり; "Curious"))		Moritaka	Carlos Kanno; Yasuaki Maejima	2:47
9.	"Waka Sugita Koi" ((若すぎた恋; "Too Young for Love"))		Takahashi	Takahashi	4:28
10.	"A-kun no Higeki" ((A君の悲劇; "The Tragedy of Boy A"))		Saitō	Saitō	4:38
11.	"Yoru no Entotsu" ((夜の煙突; "Night Chimney"))	Naoe	Naoe	Carnation	4:49
12.	"Sonogo no Watashi (Moritaka Connection)" (Sonogo no Watashi (Moritaka Konekushon) (その後の私（森高コネクション）; "Me Afterwards (Moritaka Connection)"))		Saitō	Saitō	4:06
13.	"Yume no Naka no Kiss" (Yume no Naka no Kisu (夢の中のキス; "A Kiss in a Dream"))		Takahashi	Takahashi	3:07
14.	"17-sai (Orange Mix)" (Jūnana-sai (Orenji Mikkusu) (17才 (オレンジ・ミックス); "17 Years Old (Orange Mix)"))	Arima	Tsutsumi	Saitō	5:14
Total length:					56:00

== Personnel ==
- Chisato Moritaka – vocals, synthesizer percussion (8)
- Hideo Saitō – all instruments, programming, backing vocals (all tracks except where indicated)
- Yuichi Takahashi – guitar, keyboards, backing vocals (3, 9); bass, tambourine (13)
- Akira Wada – guitar (8)
- Yukio Seto – guitar (13)
- Yasuaki Maejima – piano (8)
- Naoki Suzuki – synthesizers (3, 9)
- Hiromichi Tsugaki – synthesizers (8)
- Kazuyoshi Yamauchi – bass (3, 9)
- Hiroshi Sawada – bass (8)
- Naoki Kimura – drums (3, 9)
- Mansaku Kimura – drums (8)
- Carlos Kanno – tambourine, percussion (3, 8)
- Kenji Yoshida – trumpet (8)
- Masahiro Kobayashi – trumpet (8)
- Osamu Matsuki – trombone (8)
- Hisashi Yoshinaga – alto saxophone (8)
- Takeru Muraoka – alto saxophone (8)
- Carnation (1, 6, 11)

- Masataro Naoe – acoustic and electric guitars, backing vocals
- Giro Bando – guitar
- Yuji Mada – bass
- Yuichi Tanaya – keyboards, backing vocals
- Hiroshi Yabe – drums

== Charts ==
Chart (1989)	Peak position
Japanese Albums (Oricon)	2

== Certification ==
Region	Certification	Certified units/sales
Japan (RIAJ)	Gold	200,000^{^}
^{^} Shipments figures based on certification alone.

== See also ==
- 1989 in Japanese music
