= Let's Go! (Chisato Moritaka song) =

1996 song by Chisato Moritaka

Single by Chisato Moritaka

from the album Peachberry
- Language: Japanese
- B-side: "Let's Go! II; Bōttoshite Miyou"
- Released: February 25, 1997
- Recorded: 1996
- Genre: J-pop; pop rock
- Length: 4:28
- Label: One Up Music
- Songwriters: Chisato Moritaka; Hiromasa Ijichi
- Producer: Yukio Seto

Chisato Moritaka singles chronology
"Gin'iro no Yume" (1996)	"Let's Go!" (1997)	"Sweet Candy" (1997)

Let's Go! EP

EP by Chisato Moritaka
- Released: February 25, 1997
- Recorded: 1996
- Genre: J-pop; pop rock
- Language: Japanese
- Label: Sha-Lee-See
- Producer: Yukio Seto

"Let's Go!" (レッツ・ゴー!, Rettsu Gō!) is the 31st single by Japanese singer/songwriter Chisato Moritaka. Written by Moritaka and Hiromasa Ijichi, the single was released by One Up Music on February 25, 1997. Two versions of the single were released: an 8 cm CD single and an EP version on 12-inch LP - both with different tracks. The song was used by Lawson for their store commercials.

== Chart performance ==
"Let's Go!" peaked at No. 19 on Oricon's singles chart and sold 93,000 copies. It was also certified Gold by the RIAJ.

== Other versions ==
Moritaka re-recorded the song and uploaded the video on her YouTube channel on August 29, 2013. This version is also included in Moritaka's 2014 self-covers DVD album Love Vol. 5.

== Track listing ==
All lyrics are written by Chisato Moritaka; all music is arranged by Yuichi Takahashi.

8 cm CD
No.	Title	Music	Length
1.	"Let's Go!"	Hiromasa Ijichi	4:28
2.	"Let's Go! II"	Ijichi	4:28
3.	"Bōttoshite Miyou (Sweet Baby Version)" ((ボーッとしてみよう; "Let's Do It! (Sweet Baby Version)"))	Moritaka	3:46
4.	"Let's Go!" (Original Karaoke)		4:23

Let's Go! EP
No.	Title	Music	Length
1.	"Let's Go!"	Ijichi
2.	"Mitatōri yo Watashi (Noisy Instrumental)" ((見たとおりよ私; "As You See Me"))	Moritaka
3.	"Miracle Woman (Miracle Master Mix)" (Mirakuru Ūman (ミラクルウーマン))	Haruomi Hosono
4.	"Pappappaya (Smoothly)" ((パッパッパヤ))	Moritaka

== Personnel ==
- Chisato Moritaka – vocals, drums, kalimba
- Yuichi Takahashi – acoustic guitar, keyboards
- Shin Hashimoto – piano, keyboard, Fender Rhodes, kalimba, clarinet, synthesizer
- Yukio Seto – electric guitar, bass, wind chime, percussion, djembe, didgeridoo
- Haruomi Hosono – synthesizer programming, keyboards

== Chart positions ==
Chart (1997)	Peak position
Japanese Oricon Singles Chart	19

== Certification ==
Region	Certification	Certified units/sales
Japan (RIAJ)	Gold	200,000^{^}
^{^} Shipments figures based on certification alone.
