= New Season (Chisato Moritaka album) =

Studio album by Chisato Moritaka
- Released: July 25, 1987
- Recorded: 1987
- Studio: Sound Inn; Hitokuchizaka; Smile Garage; Cherry Island; Sound Valley; Onkio Haus; Warner-Pioneer Studio
- Length: 42:27
- Language: Japanese
- Label: Warner Pioneer
- Producer: Yūzō Shimada

Chisato Moritaka chronology
New Season (1987)	Mi-ha (1988)

Singles from New Season
- 1. "New Season" Released: May 25, 1987

New Season (ニューシーズン, Nyū Shīzun) is the debut studio album by Japanese singer Chisato Moritaka, released on July 25, 1987, by Warner Pioneer. It was produced by Yūzō Shimada, who also produced albums by Akina Nakamori, Naomi Tamura, and Aco. At the time of the album's recording, Moritaka had not started to write songs; instead, the album's songs were written by several composers such as Hiromasa Ijichi, Hideo Saitō, and Shingo Kanno (of the band Orquesta de la Luz).

The album peaked at No. 21 on Oricon's albums chart and sold over 43,000 copies.

== Track listing ==
Side A
No.	Title	Lyrics	Music	Arrangement	Length
1.	"Namida Good-bye" (Namida Guddo Bai (涙 Good-bye; "Good-bye Tears"))	Shingo Kanno	Takumi Yamamoto	WISE (Kanno/Yamamoto)	4:57
2.	"Yume no Owari" ((夢の終り; "The End of a Dream"))	Kanno	Hideo Saitō	Saitō	4:16
3.	"Ringoshū no Rule" (Ringoshū no Rūru (林檎酒のルール; "Apple Cider Rules"))	Ren Takayanagi	Ken Shima	Shima	4:14
4.	"Otis Redding ni Kampai" (Ōtisu Redingu ni Kanpai (オーティスレディングに乾杯; "Cheers to Otis Redding"))	Takayanagi	Hiromichi Tsugaki	Tsugaki	4:16
5.	"Ways"	Hiromi Fukunaga	Tsugaki	Tsugaki	4:03

Side B
No.	Title	Lyrics	Music	Arrangement	Length
1.	"Period" (Piriodo (ピリオド))	HIRO	Saitō	Saitō	4:45
2.	"Ano Hi no Photograph" (Ano Hi no Fotogurafu (あの日のフォトグラフ; "The Photograph of That Day"))	Hiromasa Ijichi	Shima	Shima	5:02
3.	"Miss Lady"	Ijichi	Ijichi	WISE	4:58
4.	"New Season"	HIRO	Saitō	Saitō	5:48

== Personnel ==
- Chisato Moritaka – vocals, piano (B2), Fender Rhodes (A1), keyboard (B4)
- Hideo Saitō – guitar (A2, B1, B4), backing vocals (A2, B1, B4)
- Akira Wada – guitar (A3)
- Makoto Matsushita – guitar (B2)
- Kazuhiko Iwami – guitar (A1, B3)
- Ken Shima – keyboards (A3, B2)
- Hiromichi Tsugaki – keyboards (A4, A5)
- Nobita Tsukada – keyboards (A2, B1, B4)
- Yasuhiko Fukuda – keyboards (B4)
- Kenji Takamizu – bass (A3)
- Yasuo Tomikura – bass (B2)
- Hiroshi Sawada – bass (A1, B3)
- Chiharu Mikuzugi – bass (B4)
- Shuichi "Ponta" Murakami – drums (A3)
- Eiji Shimamura – drums (B2)
- Reuben Tsujino – drums (B4)
- Mansaku Kimura – drums (A1, B3)
- Ryo Saito – percussion (A2, B1)
- Carlos Kanno – percussion (A1, A3, B3)
- Nobu Saitō – percussion (B2)
- Kazuo Kamada – saxophone (A1, B3)
- Shigeo Fuchino – saxophone (A3, A4)
- Kōyō Murakami – trombone (B3)
- Harumi Mita – trombone (A4)
- The Three Pinkies – backing vocals (A1, A3, A4, A5)
- Yukari Fujiu – backing vocals (B4)
- Hiromasa Ijichi – backing vocals (B3)
- Maeda Strings – string orchestra (A3)
- Tomoda Strings – string orchestra (B2)
- Tomoaki Arima – synthesizer programming (A1, A4, A5, B3)
- Takanori Umeno – synthesizer programming (A3, B2)

== Charts ==
Chart (1987)	Peak position
Japanese Albums (Oricon)	21

== See also ==
- 1987 in Japanese music
