= Aitsu ni Koishite =

- Theatrical poster
- Directed by: Taku Shinjō
- Screenplay by: Shinobu Tayama
- Based on: Uma no Gonta no Se ni Yurare Yatta ze! Nihonjūdan 2600-Kilo by Yasuhisa Shimazaki
- Produced by: Nobuo Abe; Kiyoshi Suzuki
- Starring: Shingo Kazami; Hitoshi Ueki; Chisato Moritaka
- Cinematography: Shinichi Ōoka
- Edited by: Hajime Okayasu
- Music by: Yuji Ohno
- Production companies: Filmlink International; Warner Pioneer; NTV; Cinemalinks; Shogakukan; Dentsu
- Distributed by: Toho
- Release date: May 30, 1987 (Japan)
- Running time: 109 minutes
- Country: Japan
- Language: Japanese

Aitsu ni Koishite (Japanese: あいつに恋して, Hepburn: In Love with Him) is a 1987 Japanese drama film directed by Taku Shinjō, based on the 1985 novel Uma no Gonta no Se ni Yurare Yatta ze! Nihonjūdan 2600-Kilo (馬のゴン太の背にゆられ やったぜ!日本縦断2600キロ; I Was Shaken on the Back of Gonta the Horse 2,600 Kilometers Across Japan!) by Yasuhisa Shimazaki. The film is notable for the acting debut of teen singer Chisato Moritaka. Aitsu ni Koishite was released theatrically on May 30, 1987, in Japan as part of Pocari Sweat's Movie Caravan campaign.

== Plot ==
In Hidaka, Hokkaido, the Etō and Matsumae ranches rival each other over their thoroughbred horses. While the ranch owners do not see eye to eye, their grandchildren Shotarō Etō and Chisato Matsumae slowly develop feelings for each other. To prove the superiority of Hokkaido horses, Kinzō Matsumae proposes a 2,600 kilometer horseback journey across Japan. However, none of his riders are willing to take the challenge. Acting on his own, Shotarō takes Chisato's horse Gonta and embarks on the journey. Both horse and rider struggle to get along with each other while traveling to the southern tip of Hokkaido.

After crossing the Tsugaru Strait, Shotarō nearly freezes to death on Mount Hakkōda, but Gonta manages to carry him to a nearby inn. A local journalist learns of the duo and spreads the word on their adventure. After meeting up with Chisato in Tokyo, Shotarō and Gonta continue their journey southbound, enduring different challenges in Honshu. Meanwhile, Chisato learns from Shotarō's sister Komako that the rift between the Etō and Matsumae families was caused by a car accident that killed both Shotarō and Chisato's parents, with both families blaming each other for the tragedy.

Shotarō and Gonta reach the Kanmon Straits and attempt to cross it by raft after being denied a ride across the Kanmon Roadway Tunnel, but a low-flying helicopter causes them to fall into the sea and Shotarō develops pneumonia. Shotarō's grandfather Tetsunosuke meets up with him in Kitakyushu and urges him to return to Hidaka, but he refuses. While the duo crosses the dense forests of Shiiba, Miyazaki, Gonta collapses from exhaustion and Shotarō struggles to keep him warm from the heavy rain until Gonta recovers the next day. Tetsunosuke and Kinzō settle their differences after seeing Shotarō's determination to finish the journey. Shotarō and Gonta arrive in Kagoshima, with Chisato waiting for them among the crowd.

== Cast ==
- Shingo Kazami as Shotarō Etō
- Hitoshi Ueki as Tetsunosuke Etō
- Chisato Moritaka as Chisato Matsumae
- Kaku Takashina as Kinzō Matsumae
- Eisaku Shindō as Ryūji Kanamori
- Chikako Yuri as Komako Etō
- Masanori Sera as the Hakodate sailor
- Shigeru Izumiya as the middle-aged Aomori man
- Jun Hamamura as the Mount Hakkōda innkeeper
- Kappei Ina as the Mount Hakkōda journalist
- Mitsuko Baisho as the Sendai wife
- Yoshio Harada as the Sendai husband
- Kenji Sagara as the Kōriyama boy
- Tetsuya Takeda as the Gasoline station man
- Yūko Watanabe as the Cashier
- Tokue Hanasawa as the Kishimen shop owner
- Yōko Ishino as the Kyoto girl
- Hiroshi Katsuno as the Police officer
- Masakane Yonekura as the Kokura veterinarian
- Shinya Owada as the Kagoshima reporter

== Music ==
Ending:

- "New Season" by Chisato Moritaka

- Lyrics: HIRO
- Music/Arrangement: Hideo Saitō
