= Gin'iro no Yume =

1996 song by Chisato Moritaka

Single by Chisato Moritaka

from the album Peachberry
- Language: Japanese
- English title: The Silver Colored Dream
- B-side: "Taiyō to Aoi Tsuki (Taiyō Shin Version)"
- Released: November 11, 1996
- Recorded: 1996
- Genre: J-pop; pop rock
- Length: 4:05
- Label: One Up Music
- Composer: Hiromasa Ijichi
- Lyricist: Chisato Moritaka
- Producer: Yukio Seto

Chisato Moritaka singles chronology
"La La Sunshine" (1996)	"Gin'iro no Yume" (1996)	"Let's Go!" (1996)

"Gin'iro no Yume" (銀色の夢; lit. "The Silver Colored Dream") is the 30th single by Japanese singer/songwriter Chisato Moritaka. Written by Moritaka and Hiromasa Ijichi, the single was released by One Up Music on November 11, 1996. The song was used for TV commercials promoting Meiji's Melty Kiss chocolate.

== Chart performance ==
"Gin'iro no Yume" peaked at No. 9 on Oricon's singles chart and sold 236,000 copies. It was certified Gold by the RIAJ.

== Other versions ==
Moritaka re-recorded the song and uploaded the video on her YouTube channel on January 9, 2013. This version is also included in Moritaka's 2013 self-covers DVD album Love Vol. 3.

== Track listing ==
All lyrics are written by Chisato Moritaka; all music is arranged by Yuichi Takahashi.

8 cm CD
No.	Title	Music	Length
1.	"Gin'iro no Yume" ((銀色の夢; "The Silver Colored Dream"))	Hiromasa Ijichi	4:05
2.	"Taiyō to Aoi Tsuki (Taiyō Shin Version)" (Taiyō no Aoi Tsuji (Taiyō Shin Vājon) (太陽と青い月（太陽神ヴァージョン）; "The Sun and the Blue Moon (Sun God Version)"))	Moritaka	4:43
3.	"Gin'iro no Yume" (Original Karaoke)		4:03

== Personnel ==
- Chisato Moritaka – vocals, drums, piano
- Yasuaki Maejima – piano, Fender Rhodes, percussion
- Yuichi Takahashi – guitar, keyboard
- Yukio Seto – bass
- Shin Hashimoto – Taishōgoto
- Masafumi Yokoyama – bass

== Chart positions ==
Chart (1995)	Peak position
Japanese Oricon Singles Chart	9

== Certification ==
Region	Certification	Certified units/sales
Japan (RIAJ)	Gold	200,000^{^}
^{^} Shipments figures based on certification alone.
