= Utsunomiya Bunka Kaikan =

Concert hall in Utsunomiya, Japan

Coordinates: 36°32′50″N 139°52′05″E

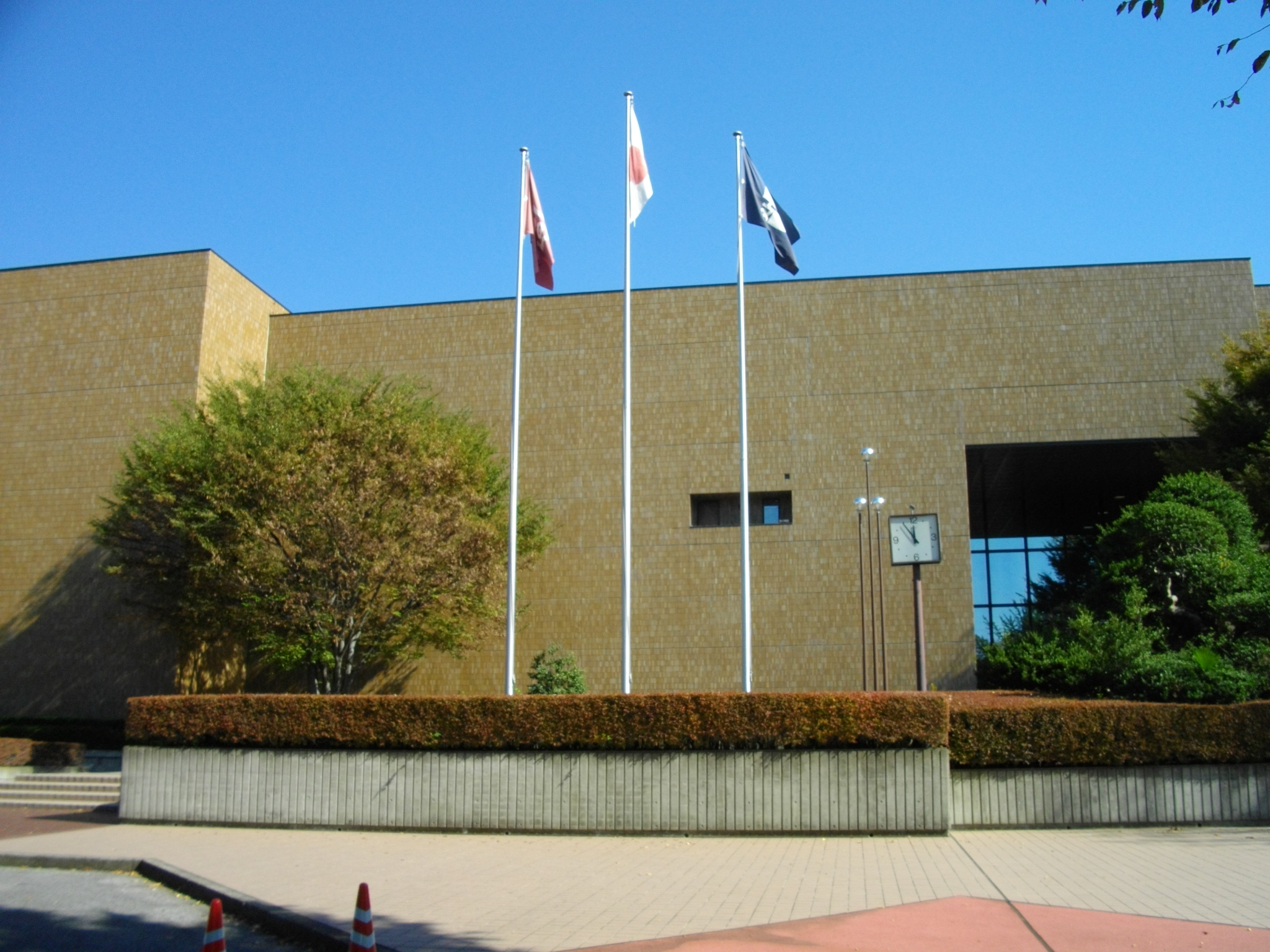
The exterior of the Utsunomiya Bunka Kaikan

Utsunomiya Bunka Kaikan is a concert hall located in Utsunomiya, Tochigi Prefecture, Japan. It features a 2,000-seat great hall and a 500-seat small hall. It opened in 1979. Whitesnake performed at Utsunomiya Bunka Kaikan during their 1983 Japanese tour.
