= The Stress =

1989 song by Chisato Moritaka

Single by Chisato Moritaka

from the album Mite
- Language: Japanese
- B-side: "Yurusenai"
- Released: February 25, 1989
- Recorded: 1988
- Genre: J-pop; dance-pop
- Length: 4:53
- Label: Warner Pioneer
- Composer: Hideo Saitō
- Lyricist: Chisato Moritaka
- Producer: Yukio Seto

Chisato Moritaka singles chronology
"Alone" (1988)	"The Stress" (1989)	"17-sai" (1989)

Music video
- The Stress on YouTube

The Stress

Video by Chisato Moritaka
- Released: April 25, 1989
- Genre: J-pop; dance-pop
- Language: Japanese
- Label: Warner Pioneer

Chisato Moritaka chronology
Mite (1988)	The Stress (1989)	Mite Special Live in Shiodome Pit II 4.1'89 (1989)

"The Stress" (ザ・ストレス, Za Sutoresu) is the sixth single by Japanese singer/songwriter Chisato Moritaka. The lyrics were written by Moritaka and the music was composed by Hideo Saitō. The single was released by Warner Pioneer on February 25, 1989. The full title of the single is "The Stress -Stress Chūkintō Version-" (ザ・ストレス -ストレス 中近東バージョン-; lit. "The Stress -Stress Middle East Version-"), a remix of "Stress" with Middle Eastern-style synthesizer arrangements.

== Background ==
During a rehearsal in the middle of her first national tour in 1988, Moritaka suffered abdominal pain and had to be hospitalized for a week after being diagnosed with acute enteritis. Her doctor told her that the inflammation was caused by mental stress. As a result, the experience inspired her to write "The Stress".

== Music video ==
The music video features Moritaka as a waitress having to deal with all kinds of customers at a ramen restaurant while visualizing her stress as a ghostly entity watching her. Since the video's release, the waitress uniform has been one of her regular costumes on her live performances. The contents of the original 8" LaserDisc release were compiled in the 2000 DVD Chisato Moritaka DVD Collection No. 5: Mite/The Stress/17-sai.

== Chart performance ==
"The Stress" peaked at No. 19 on Oricon's singles chart and sold 40,000 copies, making it her first top-20 hit.

== Other versions ==
Remixes of "The Stress" were released in the 1989 greatest hits album Moritaka Land and the 1991 remix album The Moritaka.

Moritaka re-recorded the song as "Stress (25th Anniversary Ver.)" (ストレス（25周年記念Ver.）) and uploaded the video on her YouTube channel on April 25, 2014. This version is also included in Moritaka's 2015 self-covers DVD album Love Vol. 7.

The song was remixed by tofubeats in the 2014 collaboration album Chisato Moritaka with tofubeats: Moritaka Tofu.

== Track listing ==
All lyrics are written by Chisato Moritaka, except where indicated; all music is composed and arranged by Hideo Saitō, except where indicated.

7-inch vinyl/8 cm CD
No.	Title	Length
1.	"The Stress -Stress Chūkintō Version-" (Za Sutoresu -Sutoresu Chūkintō Bājon- (ザ・ストレス -ストレス 中近東バージョン-; "The Stress -Stress Middle East Version-))	4:53
2.	"Yurusenai" ((ユルセナイ; "Unforgivable"))	3:26

Cassette
No.	Title	Length
1.	"The Stress -Stress Chūkintō Version-"
2.	"The Stress -Stress Chūkintō Version-" (Karaoke)
3.	"Yurusenai"
4.	"Yurusenai" (Karaoke)

2023 7-inch vinyl
No.	Title	Length
1.	"The Stress -Stress Chūkintō Version-"
2.	"Watarasebashi" ((渡良瀬橋; "Watarase Bridge"))

LaserDisc
No.	Title	Lyrics	Music	Arrangement	Length
1.	"Overheat Night" (Ōbāhīto Naito (オーバーヒート・ナイト))	Hiromasa Ijichi
2.	"Get Smile"	Ijichi	Ken Shima	Shima
3.	"The Stress -Stress Chūkintō Version-" (Za Sutoresu -Sutoresu Chūkintō Bājon- (ザ・ストレス -ストレス 中近東バージョン-; lit. "The Stress -Stress Middle East Version-))
4.	"Making of 'The Stress' (BGM: Modorenai Natsu)" ((メイキング・オブ・｢ザ・ストレス｣ (BGM｢戻れない夏｣); Making of "The Stress" (BGM: Summer Can't Return)))	Kanon Kuwa	Shima	Shima

== Personnel ==
- Chisato Moritaka – vocals
- Hideo Saitō – guitar, drum and synthesizer programming

== Chart positions ==
Chart (1989)	Peak position
Japanese Oricon Singles Chart	19

== Natsumi Abe version ==
"The Stress"

Single by Natsumi Abe

from the album Natsumi Abe ~Best Selection~ 15 Shoku no Nigaoe Tachi
- Language: Japanese
- B-side: "The Stress (Crisis Version)"
- Released: June 28, 2006
- Genre: J-pop
- Length: 3:56
- Label: hachama
- Composer: Hideo Saitō
- Lyricist: Chisato Moritaka

Natsumi Abe singles chronology
"Sweetholic" (2006)	"The Stress" (2006)	"Amasugitakajitsu" (2006)

"The Stress" was covered by Natsumi Abe in 2006 as her seventh single. This version reached No. 14 in Oricon's singles chart. Abe performed an a cappella version of the song in a Georgia GABA commercial.

=== Track listing ===
All lyrics are written by Chisato Moritaka; all music is composed by Hideo Saitō.

No.	Title	Arrangement	Length
1.	"The Stress" (Za Sutoresu (ザ・ストレス))	Keiichi Ueno	3:59
2.	"The Stress (Crisis Version)" (Za Sutoresu (Kiki Bājon) (ザ・ストレス (危機Version)))	Manao Doi	4:15
3.	"The Stress (shakabone HIDE Remix)" (Za Sutoresu (Shakabone Hide Rīmikkusu) (ザ・ストレス (shakabone HIDE Remix)))	shakabone HIDE	4:23
4.	"The Stress (A cappella Version)" (Za Sutoresu (A kapera Bājon) (ザ・ストレス (アカペラVersion)))		0:44
5.	"The Stress (Original Karaoke)" (Za Sutoresu (Orijinaru Karaoke) (ザ・ストレス (オリジナルカラオケ)))	Ueno	3:56

=== Chart positions ===
Chart (2006)	Peak position
Japanese Oricon Singles Chart	14

== See also ==
- 1989 in Japanese music
