= Noriko Katō =

Japanese actress and singer-songwriter (born 1973)

- 加藤 紀子
- Born: Noriko Katō; January 30, 1973 (age 53); Suzuka, Mie, Japan
- Occupations: Actress; singer-songwriter
- Agent: Up-Front Create
- Height: 164 cm (5 ft 5 in)
- Spouses: Yoshio Wakatsuki (m. 2005; div. 2010) Hiroshi Kawabe (m. 2013)
- Musical career
- Genres: J-pop; dance-pop
- Instrument: Vocals
- Years active: 1991–present
- Label: Chichūkai Label; zetima; One Up Music; Warner Music Japan

Japanese name
- Kanji: 加藤 紀子
- Hiragana: かとう のりこ
- Katakana: カトウ ノリコ
Transcriptions
- Romanization: Katō Noriko
- Website: www.up-front-create.com/noriko_katou/

Noriko Katō (加藤 紀子, Katō Noriko) (born January 30, 1973) is a Japanese actress and singer-songwriter. She is affiliated with Up-Front Create, a subsidiary of the Up-Front Group.

== Biography ==
Born in Suzuka, Mie, Japan, Noriko Katō graduated from Tokyo Metropolitan Yoyogi High School.

Katō's career began in 1991 as a member of Sakurakko Club, together with Anza Oyama, Miki Nakatani, Miho Kanno, and Hiroko Kurumizawa. On July 25, 1992, she released her first single, a cover of Chisato Moritaka's "Kondo Watashi Doko ka Tsurete itte Kudasai yo". The single peaked at No. 69 on Oricon's singles chart and earned her a New Artist Award nomination at the 34th Japan Record Awards.

In 2000, Katō moved to France to study the French language. She resumed her entertainment career when she returned to Japan two years later.

In January 2023, Katō switched her talent agency from J.P. Room to Up-Front Create.

== Personal life ==
Katō married creative director Yoshio Wakatsuki (若槻 善雄, Wakatsuki Yoshio) on December 27, 2005. They divorced on April 15, 2010. On March 3, 2013, Katō married Tokyo No. 1 Soul Set member Hiroshi Kawabe (川辺 ヒロシ, Kawabe Hiroshi).

== Filmography ==
=== TV drama ===
- Shampoo Time (シャンプータイム, Shanpū Taimu) (NTV, 1993)
- Tokyo Daigaku Monogatari (東京大学物語; Tokyo University Story) (TV Asahi, 1994)
- Saikō no Koibito (最高の恋人; The Best Lover) (TV Asahi, 1995)
- Glass no Kutsu (ガラスの靴, Garasu no Kutsu; The Glass Slipper) (NTV, 1997)
- Seizetsu! Yome Shūto Sensō Rasetsu no Ie (凄絶!嫁姑戦争 羅刹の家, Awesome! Wife-in-Law War) (TV Asahi, 1998)
- Dokushin Seikatsu (独身生活; Single Life) (TBS, 1999)
- Virtual Girl (バーチャルガール, Bācharu Gāru) (NTV, 2000)
- Shōnan Kawara Yane Monogatari (湘南瓦屋根物語; Shōnan Tile Roof Story) (TV Tokyo, 2002)
- Little Hospital (リトルホスピタル, Ritoru Hosupitaru) (TV Tokyo, 2003)
- Kētai Keiji Zenigata Yui (ケータイ刑事 銭形結; Mobile Phone Criminal) (TBS, 2010)
- 461-Ko no Arigatō. 〜 Aijō Bentō ga Hagukunda Chantoko no Kizuna 〜 (461個のありがとう。 〜愛情弁当が育んだ父と子の絆〜; Thank you 461. ~ The Bond Between Father and Child That Love Bento Brought Up ~) (NHK, 2015)

== Discography ==
=== Singles ===
List of singles, with selected chart positions
Title	Date	Peak chart positions	Sales (JPN)	RIAJ certification	Album
Title	Date	Oricon Singles Charts	Sales (JPN)	RIAJ certification	Album
"Kondo Watashi Doko ka Tsurete itte Kudasai yo"	July 25, 1992	69		N/A	De Beaux
"Omoikiri Naite ii"	August 25, 1993	96		N/A	De Beaux
"Kono Michi wo Aruiteku"	January 25, 1994	95		N/A	De Beaux
"Densha no Hito"	April 1, 1994	—		N/A	Non-album single
"Truth"	October 10, 1995	33		N/A	Flower Diamond
"Genki de Iru yo"	February 26, 1996	40		N/A	Flower Diamond
"Tsumetaku Shite Kudasai"	May 10, 1996	42		N/A	Flower Diamond
"Chiisana Shiawase"	October 10, 1996	35		N/A	Souvenir
"Invitation"	June 25, 1997	59		N/A	Souvenir
"Fuyu ga Kita"	January 15, 1998	59		N/A	Souvenir
"Hanareba Nare ni?"	January 13, 1999	77		N/A	La Fraise
"Ichigo"	May 12, 1999	—		N/A	La Fraise
"Itsuka Ōjisama ga"	February 19, 2000	—		N/A	Non-album single
"—" denotes releases that did not chart.

=== Studio albums ===
Year	Information	Oricon weekly peak position	Sales	RIAJ certification
1994	De Beaux: Released: March 10, 1994; Label: Warner Music Japan; Formats: CD, cassette	—		
1996	Flower Diamond: Released: May 25, 1996; Label: One Up Music; Formats: CD, cassette	42		
1998	Souvenir: Released: February 5, 1998; Label: One Up Music; Formats: CD	40		
1999	La Fraise: Released: May 21, 1999; Label: zetima; Formats: CD	—		

=== Cover albums ===
Year	Information	Oricon weekly peak position	Sales	RIAJ certification
2005	Les Oiseaux Bleu: Released: May 11, 2005; Label: zetima; Formats: CD	—		

=== Video albums ===
Year	Information	Oricon weekly peak position	Sales	RIAJ certification
1992	Kondo Watashi Doko ka Tsurete itte Kudasai yo: Released: September 25, 1992; Label: Warner Music Japan; Formats: VHS	—		
1996	Chiisana Shiawase: Released: November 11, 1996; Label: One Up Music; Formats: VHS	—		
