= Kondo Watashi Doko ka Tsurete itte Kudasai yo =

1990 song by Chisato Moritaka

"Kondo Watasi Doko ka Tsurete itte Kudasai yo"

Song by Chisato Moritaka

from the album Hijitsuryokuha Sengen
- Language: Japanese
- English title: Take Me Out Somewhere Next Time
- Released: July 25, 1989
- Recorded: 1989
- Genre: J-pop; dance-pop
- Length: 3:44
- Label: Warner Pioneer
- Composer: Hideo Saitō
- Lyricist: Chisato Moritaka
- Producer: Yukio Seto

"Kondo Watashi Doko ka Tsurete itte Kudasai yo" (今度私どこか連れていって下さいよ; lit. "Take Me Out Somewhere Next Time") is a song by Japanese singer/songwriter Chisato Moritaka, from her 1989 studio album Hijitsuryokuha Sengen. The lyrics were written by Moritaka and the music was composed by Hideo Saitō.

Moritaka re-recorded the song and uploaded the video on her YouTube channel on February 12, 2013. This version is also included in Moritaka's 2013 self-covers DVD album Love Vol. 4.

== Noriko Katō version ==
"Kondo Watashi Doko ka Tsurete itte Kudasai yo"

Single by Noriko Katō

from the album De Beaux
- Language: Japanese
- English title: Take Me Out Somewhere Next Time
- B-side: "Hikisakanaide Futari wo"
- Released: July 25, 1992
- Recorded: 1992
- Genre: J-pop; dance-pop
- Label: Warner Music Japan
- Composer: Hideo Saitō
- Lyricist: Chisato Moritaka
- Producer: Yukio Seto

Noriko Katō singles chronology
"Kondo Watashi Doko ka Tsurete itte Kudasai yo" (1992)	"Omoikiri Naite ii" (1993)

Japanese singer Noriko Katō released her cover of "Kondo Watashi Doko ka Tsurete itte Kudasai yo" as her debut single on July 25, 1992. It was used as the ending theme of the ANB TV series Bin Bin House. Because Katō was 19 years old at the time of the single's release, the line "Futari de osake no mitai" (二人でお酒 飲みたい; "Let's drink together") was replaced with "Futari de shokuji wo suru no" (二人で食事をするの; "Let's have a meal together").

The B-side is "Hikisakanaide Futari wo" (引き裂かないで二人を; lit. "Don't Tear Us Apart"). The lyrics were written by Moritaka and the music was composed by Hideo Saitō. Moritaka recorded her version of the song on her 1999 compilation album Harvest Time.

The music video features Katō as a waitress at a restaurant near a construction site. She is madly in love with a construction worker named Kōji to the point where she gives him larger servings of his order than his co-workers. An embarrassed Kōji stands up and he and everyone in the restaurant stare at Katō before the song plays on the television, with Katō singing and dancing on a blue screen background.

The single peaked at No. 69 on Oricon's singles chart. It also earned her a New Artist Award nomination at the 34th Japan Record Awards.

=== Track listing ===
All lyrics are written by Chisato Moritaka; all music is composed and arranged by Hideo Saitō.

Single
No.	Title	Length
1.	"Kondo Watashi Doko ka Tsurete itte Kudasai yo" ((今度私どこか連れていって下さいよ; lit. "Take Me Out Somewhere Next Time"))
2.	"Hikisakanaide Futari wo" ((引き裂かないで二人を; lit. "Don't Tear Us Apart"))
3.	"Kondo Watashi Doko ka Tsurete itte Kudasai yo" (Original Karaoke)

=== Chart positions ===
Chart (1992)	Peak position
Japanese Oricon Singles Chart	69
