= Overheat Night =

1987 song by Chisato Moritaka

Single by Chisato Moritaka

from the album Mi-ha
- Language: Japanese
- B-side: Weekend Blue (EP/CT); Overheat Night (Instrumental) (Extended Mix)
- Released: October 25, 1987 (EP/CT); November 3, 2019 (Extended Mix)
- Recorded: 1987
- Genre: J-pop; dance-pop
- Length: 4:52
- Label: Warner Pioneer
- Composer: Hideo Saitō
- Lyricist: Hiromasa Ijichi
- Producer: Yukio Seto

Chisato Moritaka singles chronology
| "New Season" (1987) | "Overheat Night" (1987) | "Get Smile" (1988) |

Chisato Moritaka singles chronology
| "Ame/ Watarasebashi" (2009) | "Overheat Night (Extended Mix)" (2019) |

Alternative cover
- "Overheat Night" (Extended Mix)

Music video
- Overheat Night on YouTube

Overheat Night

Video by Chisato Moritaka
- Released: November 28, 1988
- Genre: J-pop; dance-pop; pop rock
- Language: Japanese
- Label: Warner Pioneer
- Producer: Yukio Seto

Chisato Moritaka chronology
| Mi-ha (1988) | Overheat Night (1988) | Mite (1988) |

"Overheat Night" (オーバーヒート・ナイト, Ōbāhīto Naito) (stylized as "OVERHEAT.NIGHT") is the second single by Japanese singer Chisato Moritaka. Written by Hiromasa Ijichi and Hideo Saitō, the single was released by Warner Pioneer on October 25, 1987. In contrast to the pop rock sound of Moritaka's debut single "New Season", the song uses a dance-pop arrangement.

"Overnight Heat" was also released as the B-side of the mini CD reissue of "New Season" on March 25, 1988.

The video album of "Overheat Night" was released in CDV format on November 28, 1988.

Warner Music Japan released the "Overheat Night (Extended Mix)" 12" vinyl on November 3, 2019.

== Chart performance ==
"Overheat Night" peaked at No. 24 on Oricon's singles chart and sold 22,000 copies. The 2019 Extended Mix LP reached No. 80.

== Other versions ==
"Overheat Night" was remixed for the 1989 greatest hits album Moritaka Land.

Moritaka re-recorded the song and uploaded the video on her YouTube channel on July 19, 2014. This version is also included in Moritaka's 2015 self-covers DVD album Love Vol. 7.

== Track listing ==
All lyrics are written by Hiromasa Ijichi, except where indicated; all music is composed and arranged by Hideo Saitō.

7-inch vinyl
| No. | Title | Length |
|---|---|---|
| 1. | "Overheat Night" (Ōbāhīto Naito (オーバーヒート・ナイト)) | 4:52 |
| 2. | "Weekend Blue" | 4:23 |

Cassette
| No. | Title | Length |
|---|---|---|
| 1. | "Overheat Night" |
| 2. | "Weekend Blue" |
| 3. | "Overheat Night" (Karaoke) |
| 4. | "Weekend Blue" (Karaoke) |

CDV
| No. | Title | Lyrics | Length |
|---|---|---|---|
| 1. | "New Season (SL Version)" | HIRO |
| 2. | "Yume no Owari" ((夢の終り; "The End of a Dream")) | Shingo Kanno |
| 3. | "Period (LP Version)" (Piriodo (ピリオド)) |
| 4. | "Weekend Blue" |
| 5. | "Overheat Night (Video Part)" |

12" EP
| No. | Title | Length |
|---|---|---|
| 1. | "Overheat Night" (Extended Mix) | 6:58 |
| 2. | "Overheat Night" (Instrumental) | 5:08 |

== Personnel ==
- Chisato Moritaka – vocals
- Hideo Saitō – guitar, backing vocals, drum and synthesizer programming
- Nobita Tsukada – keyboards, synthesizer programming
- Reuben Tsujino – percussion
- Shingo Kanno – congas
- Misa Nakayama – backing vocals

== Chart positions ==
| Chart (1987) | Peak position |
|---|---|
| Japanese Oricon Singles Chart | 24 |

| Chart (2019) | Peak position |
|---|---|
| Japanese Oricon Singles Chart | 80 |

== See also ==
- 1987 in Japanese music
