= 17-sai (song) =

1971 song by Saori Minami

Single by Saori Minami

from the album 17-sai
- Language: Japanese
- English title: 17 Years Old
- B-side: "Shima no Densetsu"
- Released: June 1, 1971
- Recorded: 1971
- Genre: Kayōkyoku
- Length: 2:46
- Label: CBS Sony
- Composer: Kyōhei Tsutsumi
- Lyricist: Mieko Arima
- Producer: Masatoshi Sakai

Saori Minami singles chronology
"17-sai" (1971)	"Shiokaze no Melody" (1971)

Audio video
- "17-sai" on YouTube

"17-sai" (17才 (じゅうななさい), Jūnana-sai; lit. "17 Years Old") (also known as "Seventeen") is the debut single by Japanese singer Saori Minami. Composed by Kyōhei Tsutsumi with lyrics by Mieko Arima, the single was released by CBS Sony on June 1, 1971. Tsutsumi based the song on "Rose Garden" by Lynn Anderson when he learned it was Minami's favorite song. Arima, who was 40 years old at the time, surprised her close friends when she was able to express the feelings of a 17-year-old girl in the song's lyrics.

The jacket cover features Minami wearing a shirt that has a drawing of a crab, which symbolizes Cancer as her zodiac sign. Stickers of a crab mascot were distributed in the campaign promoting the single.

The song peaked at No. 2 on Oricon's singles chart and was the 11th best selling single of 1971 in Japan, catapulting her into stardom as an idol. It also earned Minami numerous awards such as the Best New Artist at the 1971 Japan Music Awards and the Gold Prize at the 1971 Shinjuku Music Festival. Minami was also nominated for Best New Artist at the 13th Japan Record Awards, but lost to Rumiko Koyanagi. The song gave Minami the top spot in the red team on the 22nd Kōhaku Uta Gassen.

== Track listing ==
All lyrics are written by Mieko Arima; all music is composed and arranged by Kyōhei Tsutsumi.

No.	Title	Length
1.	"17-sai" (Jūnana-sai (17才 (じゅうななさい); lit. "17 Years Old"))	2:46
2.	"Shima no Densetsu" ((島の伝説; "Legend of an Isle"))	2:36

== Chart positions ==
Chart (1971)	Peak position
Japanese Oricon Singles Chart	2

== Chisato Moritaka version ==
"17-sai"

Single by Chisato Moritaka

from the album Hijitsuryokuha Sengen
- Language: Japanese
- English title: 17 Years Old
- B-side: "20-sai"
- Released: May 25, 1989
- Recorded: 1989
- Studio: Saito House
- Genre: J-pop; Eurobeat
- Length: 4:55
- Label: Warner Pioneer
- Composer: Kyōhei Tsutsumi
- Lyricist: Mieko Arima
- Producers: Yukio Seto; Hideo Saitō

Chisato Moritaka singles chronology
"The Stress" (1989)	"17-sai" (1989)	"Daite" (1989)

Music videos
- "17-sai" on YouTube

17-sai

Video by Chisato Moritaka
- Released: November 10, 1989
- Recorded: 1989
- Genre: J-pop; Eurobeat; pop rock
- Language: Japanese
- Label: Warner Pioneer
- Producer: Yukio Seto

Chisato Moritaka chronology
Mite Special Live in Shiodome Pit II 4.15'89 (1989)	17-sai (1989)	The Third Live Video Hijitsuryokuha Sengen (1990)

A cover version of "17-sai" was recorded by Chisato Moritaka and released by Warner Pioneer on May 25, 1989 as her seventh single. She debuted the song during her Mite ~Special~ Live Tour earlier that year. This version is known for its Eurobeat arrangement and Moritaka's catchy dance choreography on live performances, which often features colorful costumes with flashy miniskirts. The single peaked at No. 8 on Oricon's singles chart and sold 195,000 copies, making it her first top 10 single and her first single to sell over 100,000 copies. It was also ranked at No. 43 on Oricon's 1989 year-ending chart. Moritaka's "17-sai" was nominated for the Grand Prix at the 22nd Japan Cable Awards, but lost to Princess Princess' "Diamonds".

Two other versions of the song appear in Moritaka's fourth album Hijitsuryokuha Sengen. The first is "17-sai (Carnation Version)" (17才（カーネーション・ヴァージョン）, Jūnana-sai (Kānēshon Vājon)), an indie pop version arranged by Masataro Naoe of the band Carnation. The second is "17-sai (Orange Mix)" (17才（オレンジ・ミックス）, Jūnana-sai (Orenji Mikkusu)), which is an extended remix of the single. In addition, a different remix of "17-sai" is included in the 1989 remix album Moritaka Land.

The music video of "17-sai" features Moritaka dancing in three color variants of her signature dance outfit. The white/blue outfit shown on the LaserDisc cover does not appear in the video, but was as prominent on live and TV performances as the blue/yellow version. The contents of the original LD release were compiled in the 2000 DVD Chisato Moritaka DVD Collection No. 5: Mite/The Stress/17-sai.

In the years since the release of the music video, Moritaka's "17-sai" costume has been replicated by other artists. In 2010, Rina Koike wore the white/blue outfit to promote her gravure book, also titled 17-sai. Erina Mano wore a variation of the white/blue costume in the music video of her 2012 single "Doki Doki Baby".

Moritaka re-recorded the song on both vocals and drums and uploaded the video on her YouTube channel on January 5, 2013. This version is also included in Moritaka's 2013 self-covers DVD album Love Vol. 3. During her "Premium Nights @ Cotton Club" show on December 11, 2015, she introduced a smooth R&B arrangement of the song called "17-sai (Slow Version)" (17才（スローヴァージョン）, Jūnana-sai (Surō Vājon)).

=== Track listing ===
All music is arranged by Hideo Saitō, except where indicated.

8 cm CD
No.	Title	Lyrics	Music	Length
1.	"17-sai" (Jūnana-sai (17才 (じゅうななさい); "17 Years Old"))	Mieko Arima	Kyōhei Tsutsumi	4:55
2.	"20-sai" (Nijū-sai (20才 (にじゅうさい); "20 Years Old"))	Chisato Moritaka	Hideo Saitō	4:45

Cassette
No.	Title	Lyrics	Music	Length
1.	"17-sai"	Arima	Tsutsumi
2.	"17-sai" (Karaoke)
3.	"20-sai"	Moritaka	Saitō
4.	"20-sai" (Karaoke)

2023 7-inch vinyl
No.	Title	Music	Length
1.	"17-sai"
2.	"Ame" ((雨; "Rain"))	Seiji Matsuura

LaserDisc
No.	Title	Lyrics	Music	Arrangement	Length
1.	"17-sai"	Arima	Tsutsumi
2.	"Daite (Las Vegas Version)" (Daite (Rasu Begasu Vājon) (だいて (ラスベガス・ヴァージョン); "Hold Me (Las Vegas Version)"))	Moritaka	Yuichi Takahashi	Takahashi
3.	"Yoru no Entotsu" ((夜の煙突; "Night Chimney"))	Masataro Naoe	Naoe	Carnation
4.	"The Making [Watashi wa Onchi]" (Za Meikingu [Watashi wa Onchi] (ザ・メイキング ［私はおんち］; "The Making [I'm Tone Deaf]"))	Moritaka	Takahashi	Takahashi

=== Personnel ===
- Chisato Moritaka – vocals
- Hideo Saitō – guitar, drum and synthesizer programming

=== Chart positions ===
Chart (1989)	Peak position
Japanese Oricon Singles Chart	8

== Ging Nang Boyz version ==
"17-sai"

Single by Ging Nang Boyz

from the album Hikari no Naka ni Tatteitene
- Language: Japanese
- English title: 17 Years Old
- B-side: "17-sai (Byōshitsu ni Iru ano Ko e)"
- Released: November 19, 2008
- Recorded: 2008
- Studio: Studio Tri-Tone
- Genre: J-pop; punk rock
- Length: 3:11
- Label: UK Project
- Composer: Kyōhei Tsutsumi
- Lyricist: Mieko Arima
- Producer: Ging Nang Boyz

Ging Nang Boyz singles chronology
"Hikari" (2007)	"17-sai" (2008)	"Boyz on the Run" (2009)

Japanese punk rock band Ging Nang Boyz covered "17-sai" and released it as their third single through UK Project on November 19, 2008. It was used as the theme song of the film Oretachi ni Asu wa Naissu. The B-side is an alternate recording of the song titled "17-sai (Byōshitsu ni Iru ano Ko e)" (17才 - 病室にいるあの娘へ; "17 Years Old - To That Girl in the Hospital Room"). The single peaked at No. 7 on Oricon's singles chart.

=== Track listing ===
All lyrics are written by Mieko Arima; all music is composed by Kyōhei Tsutsumi; all tracks are arranged by Ging Nang Boyz.

No.	Title	Length
1.	"17-sai" (Jūnana-sai (17才 (じゅうななさい); lit. "17 Years Old"))	3:11
2.	"17-sai (Byōshitsu ni Iru ano Ko e)" ((17才 - 病室にいるあの娘へ; "17 Years Old - To That Girl in the Hospital Room"))	6:58

=== Chart positions ===
Chart (2008)	Peak position
Japanese Oricon Singles Chart	7

== Other cover versions ==
- Masako Mori covered the song on her 1972 album Sensei/Dōkyūsei.
- Yuri Hayama covered the song on her 1972 album Akogare.
- Hiromi Kurita covered the song on her 1973 album Taiyō to Umi to Orange.
- Junko Sakurada covered the song on her 1974 album Junko to Hana Monogatari.
- Jō Toyokawa covered the song on her 1975 album Kegarenakiitazura/Hoshi Meguri.
- Kaoruko Arai covered the song on her 1982 live album Kaoruko... Live Best.
- Corinne Tell covered the song on her 1989 album Himitsu no Rakuen.
- Gilgame Sexy Mates covered the song on their 1992 album Sexy Time Slip.
- Bambee covered the song in English as "Seventeen" on her 2001 album Fairytales. That same year, this version was featured in the video games Dance Dance Revolution 5thMix and Dance Maniax 2ndMix append J✭Paradise to promote the Dancemania Presents J✭Paradise compilation album.
- Shinko Katsuno covered the song for a 2001 Fibe Mini commercial.
- Saori Gotō covered the song on her 2005 album Mansuri Moe Vocal Collection Vol. 1.
- Reika Morishita covered the song on her 2006 album Romantic Woman Trance ~ Ā Mujō.
- Shōwa Shocking covered the song on their 2007 album Song for Life.
- Alani Ohana Band covered the song on their 2007 album Tokyo Hawaii.
- wiz-us covered the song on their 2007 album Nakayukui.
- Donna Fiore covered the song on her 2008 album fiore.
- DJ Sasa with Island Souls (featuring Yammy) covered the song on their 2010 album Island Souls Reggae for Drive.
- You Kikkawa covered the song as the B-side of her 2012 single "Koko kara Hajimarun da!" and her 2012 cover album Vocalist?.
- Rina Rukawa covered the song as a single in 2014.
- Tsubaki Factory covered the song on their 2016 EP Tsubaki Factory Sound + Vision Vol. 1.
- Sayuri Hara, Ruriko Aoki, and Marie Miyake covered the song in 2018 for The Idolmaster Cinderella Girls album Cinderella Party! Dere pa Ondo Don Don Ka.
- Tao Tsuchiya and Kanako Momota covered the song in the 2019 TV special Yakusoku no Stage: Toki wo Kakeru Futari no Uta.

== See also ==
- 1971 in Japanese music
