= Daite =

1989 song by Chisato Moritaka

Single by Chisato Moritaka

from the album Hijitsuryokuha Sengen
- Language: Japanese
- English title: Hold Me
- B-side: "Waka Sugita Koi"
- Released: September 25, 1989
- Recorded: 1989
- Genre: J-pop; pop rock
- Length: 4:57
- Label: Warner Pioneer
- Composer: Yuichi Takahashi
- Lyricist: Chisato Moritaka
- Producer: Yukio Seto

Chisato Moritaka singles chronology
"17-sai" (1989)	"Daite" (1989)	"Michi/Seishun" (1990)

Music video
- Daite on YouTube

"Daite" (だいて; lit. "Hold Me") is the eighth single by Japanese singer/songwriter Chisato Moritaka. Written by Moritaka and Yuichi Takahashi, the single was released by Warner Pioneer on September 25, 1989. The song marked a departure from her previous pop singles, using a 1960s classic rock style. It is included in the 1991 remix album The Moritaka.

== Music video ==
The music video was filmed in Tokyo, but clever editing is used to suggest it was held at the Las Vegas Club, with Moritaka playing a Rickenbacker electric guitar alongside a group of non-Japanese male and females strumming guitars and a saxophonist on stage. During the time, she only started playing the electric guitar and would not master it until her sixth studio album Rock Alive in 1992.

== Chart performance ==
"Daite" peaked at No. 8 on Oricon's singles chart and sold 57,000 copies.

== Other versions ==
The album version of "Daite", from the 1989 album Hijitsuryokuha Sengen, is arranged with a slower tempo and less instruments.

Moritaka re-recorded the song and uploaded the video on her YouTube channel on May 6, 2013. This version is also included in Moritaka's 2013 self-covers DVD album Love Vol. 4.

== Track listing ==
All lyrics are written by Chisato Moritaka; all music is composed and arranged by Yuichi Takahashi.

8 cm CD
No.	Title	Length
1.	"Daite (Las Vegas Version)" (Daite (Rasu Begasu Vājon) (だいて (ラスベガス・ヴァージョン); lit. "Hold Me (Las Vegas Version)"))	4:57
2.	"Waka Sugita Koi" ((若すぎた恋; lit. "Too Young for Love"))	4:29

Cassette
No.	Title	Length
1.	"Daite (Las Vegas Version)"
2.	"Waka Sugita Koi"
3.	"Daite (Las Vegas Version)" (Karaoke)
4.	"Waka Sugita Koi" (Karaoke)

== Personnel ==
- Chisato Moritaka – vocals
- Yuichi Takahashi – guitar, synthesizer, programming, backing vocals
- Ken Shima – piano
- Hirokuni Korekata – guitar
- Teruo Goto – tenor saxophone

== Chart positions ==
Chart (1989)	Peak position
Japanese Oricon Singles Chart	8

== See also ==
- 1989 in Japanese music
