= Alone (Chisato Moritaka song) =

1988 song by Chisato Moritaka

Single by Chisato Moritaka

from the album Mite
- Language: Japanese
- B-side: "Chase"
- Released: October 25, 1988
- Recorded: 1988
- Genre: J-pop
- Length: 4:26
- Label: Warner Pioneer
- Composer: Shinji Yasuda
- Lyricist: Chisato Moritaka
- Producer: Yukio Seto

Chisato Moritaka singles chronology
| "The Mi-ha" (1988) | "Alone" (1988) | "The Stress" (1989) |

Music videos
- "Alone" on YouTube

"Alone" (アローン, Arōn) is the fifth single by Japanese singer/songwriter Chisato Moritaka. The lyrics were written by Chisato Moritaka, the music was composed and arranged by Shinji Yasuda. The single was released by Warner Pioneer on October 25, 1988.

== Music video ==
The music video features Moritaka walking on her way home after work. During her commute, she rents a VHS copy of Aitsu ni Koishite (which she also starred in) and buys a bento meal. Upon arriving in her apartment, she has her dinner and watches the movie before looking at a ring in a jar, which is presumably an engagement ring from a former boyfriend.

== Chart performance ==
"Alone" peaked at No. 25 on Oricon's singles chart and sold 26,000 copies.

== Other versions ==
"Alone" was remixed for the 1989 greatest hits album Moritaka Land.

Moritaka re-recorded the song and uploaded the video on her YouTube channel on December 19, 2014. This version is also included in Moritaka's 2015 self-covers DVD album Love Vol. 8.

== Track listing ==
7-inch vinyl/8 cm CD
| No. | Title | Lyrics | Music | Arrangement | Length |
|---|---|---|---|---|---|
| 1. | "Alone" (Arōn (アローン)) | Chisato Moritaka | Shinji Yasuda | Yasuda | 4:26 |
| 2. | "Chase" | Kanon Kuwa | Takumi Yamamoto | Yamamoto | 4:11 |

Cassette
| No. | Title | Lyrics | Music | Arrangement | Length |
|---|---|---|---|---|---|
| 1. | "Alone" | Moritaka | Yasuda | Yasuda |
| 2. | "Chase" | Kuwa | Yamamoto | Yamamoto |
| 3. | "Alone" (Karaoke) |
| 4. | "Chase" (Karaoke) |

== Personnel ==
- Chisato Moritaka – vocals
- Naoki Suzuki – synthesizer programming
- Shinji Yasuda – backing vocals

== Charts ==
| Chart (1988) | Peak position |
|---|---|
| Japanese Oricon Singles Chart | 25 |

== See also ==
- 1988 in Japanese music
