= Michi (Chisato Moritaka song) =

1990 song by Chisato Moritaka

Single by Chisato Moritaka

from the album Moritaka Land
- Language: Japanese
- English title: Road
- A-side: "Seishun"
- Released: January 25, 1990
- Recorded: 1989
- Genre: J-pop
- Length: 4:53
- Label: Warner Pioneer
- Composer: Shinji Yasuda
- Lyricist: Chisato Moritaka
- Producer: Yukio Seto

Chisato Moritaka singles chronology
"Daite" (1989)	"Michi" / "Seishun" (1990)	"Kusai Mono ni wa Futa wo Shiro!!" (1990)

Music videos
- "Michi" on YouTube
- "Seishun" on YouTube

"Michi" (道; lit. "Road") is the ninth single by Japanese singer/songwriter Chisato Moritaka. The lyrics were written by Moritaka and the music was composed by Shinji Yasuda. The single was released alongside "Seishun" (青春; lit. "Youth") by Warner Pioneer on January 25, 1990. "Michi" was used in a Glico Pocky commercial featuring Moritaka, while "Seishun" was used in the NTV drama series Ikenai Joshikō Monogatari (いけない女子高物語; Naughty Girls' High School Story).

== Music video ==
Two music videos were made for "Michi". The first one is solely a close-up shot of Moritaka. The second video, titled "Michi (Chisato-hime no Bōken)" (道 (千里姫の冒険); lit. "Road (Princess Chisato's Adventure)") features Moritaka dressed as a western style princess aboard a ship manned by Arabian-like sailors. Both videos were released in the 1991 video album Kusai Mono ni wa Futa wo Shiro!!; the contents of the original LD release were compiled in the 2000 DVD Chisato Moritaka DVD Collection No. 6: Kusai Mono ni wa Futa wo Shiro!!/Rock Alive.

== Chart performance ==
"Michi"/"Seishun" peaked at No. 5 on Oricon's singles chart and sold 164,000 copies.

== Other versions ==
A remix of "Seishun" is included in the 1991 remix album The Moritaka.

Moritaka re-recorded "Michi" and uploaded the video on her YouTube channel on December 1, 2013. This version is also included in Moritaka's 2014 self-covers DVD album Love Vol. 6.

== Track listing ==
All lyrics are written by Chisato Moritaka; all music is arranged by Hideo Saitō.

8 cm CD
No.	Title	Music	Length
1.	"Michi" ((道; lit. "Road"))	Shinji Yasuda	4:53
2.	"Seishun" ((青春; lit. "Youth"))	Saitō	4:27

Cassette
No.	Title	Music	Length
1.	"Michi"	Yasuda
2.	"Michi" (Karaoke)
3.	"Seishun"	Saitō
4.	"Seishun" (Karaoke)

== Personnel ==
- Chisato Moritaka – vocals
- Hideo Saitō – all instruments, programming, backing vocals

== Charts ==
Chart (1990)	Peak position
Japanese Oricon Singles Chart	5

== Cover versions ==
- Sakura Tange covered the song as the B-side of her 1998 single "Free".

== See also ==
- 1990 in Japanese music
