= Get Smile =

1988 song by Chisato Moritaka

Single by Chisato Moritaka

from the album Mi-ha
- Language: Japanese
- B-side: "Good-Bye Season"
- Released: February 25, 1988
- Recorded: 1987
- Genre: J-pop
- Length: 4:18
- Label: Warner Pioneer
- Composer: Ken Shima
- Lyricist: Hiromasa Ijichi
- Producer: Yukio Seto

Chisato Moritaka singles chronology
"Overheat Night" (1987)	"Get Smile" (1988)	"The Mi-ha" (1988)

Music video
- Get Smile on YouTube

"Get Smile" (ゲット・スマイル, Getto Sumairu) is the third single by Japanese singer Chisato Moritaka. Written by Hiromasa Ijichi and Ken Shima, the single was released by Warner Pioneer on February 25, 1988.

The music video features studio clips and footage from Moritaka's 1987 debut concert Get Smile - Live at Nihon Seinenkan.

== Chart performance ==
"Get Smile" peaked at No. 28 on Oricon's singles chart and sold 14,000 copies.

== Other versions ==
A rock arrangement of "Get Smile" was recorded on the 1989 greatest hits album Moritaka Land.

The live version of the song is arranged differently with a faster tempo and heavier instrumentals. This version was recorded as "Get Smile (Concert Arrange Version)" on the 1991 remix album The Moritaka.

Moritaka re-recorded the song on vocals and drums and uploaded the video on her YouTube channel on January 2, 2013. This version is also included in Moritaka's 2013 self-covers DVD album Love Vol. 3.

== Track listing ==
7-inch vinyl/8 cm CD
No.	Title	Lyrics	Music	Arrangement	Length
1.	"Get Smile"	Hiromasa Ijichi	Ken Shima	Shima	4:18
2.	"Good-Bye Season"	Kanon Kuwa	Takumi Yamamoto	Yamamoto	4:24

Cassette
No.	Title	Lyrics	Music	Arrangement	Length
1.	"Get Smile"	Ijichi	Shima	Shima
2.	"Good-Bye Season"	Kuwa	Yamamoto	Yamamoto
3.	"Get Smile" (Karaoke)
4.	"Good-Bye Season" (Karaoke)

== Personnel ==
- Chisato Moritaka – vocals
- Ken Shima – keyboards
- Takayuki Negishi – synthesizer programming
- Hideo Saitō – guitar, backing vocals
- Chiharu Mikuzugi – bass
- Jake H. Concepcion – tenor saxophone
- Yukari Fujio – backing vocals

== Charts ==
Chart (1988)	Peak position
Japanese Oricon Singles Chart	28

== See also ==
- 1988 in Japanese music
