= The Mi-ha =

1988 song by Chisato Moritaka

Single by Chisato Moritaka

from the album Mi-ha
- Language: Japanese
- B-side: "Mi-ha (Original Version)"
- Released: April 25, 1988
- Recorded: 1988
- Genre: J-pop; dance-pop
- Length: 5:52
- Label: Warner Pioneer
- Composer: Hideo Saitō
- Lyricist: Chisato Moritaka
- Producer: Yukio Seto

Chisato Moritaka singles chronology
"Get Smile" (1988)	"The Mi-ha" (1988)	"Alone" (1988)

Music video
- The Mi-ha on YouTube

"The Mi-ha" (ザ・ミーハー, Za Mīhā) is the fourth single by Japanese singer/songwriter Chisato Moritaka. Released by Warner Pioneer on April 25, 1988. The lyrics were written by Chisato Moritaka, the music was composed and arranged by Hideo Saitō. The single was Moritaka's first foray in songwriting in her career. The song was used in a series of Pioneer answering machine telephone commercials featuring Moritaka.

== Background ==
"Mi-ha" is a slang term for a person obsessed with following vulgar fads and trends and is not well-educated. It usually refers to specific young women, but can also be applied to men. The term was believed to have been originated from actor Chōjirō Hayashi in his 1927 film Chigo no Kenpō. Mi-ha is written in either katakana as "ミーハー" or in hiragana as "みいはあ".

Moritaka wrote "The Mi-ha" after being asked by her management to come up with some material. She commented that the cover photo is among her favorites.

The music video features animation by Japanese cartoonist and filmmaker Yōji Kuri.

== Chart performance ==
"The Mi-ha" peaked at No. 29 on Oricon's singles chart and sold 29,000 copies.

== Other versions ==
Different remixes of "Mi-ha" were released in the 1989 greatest hits album Moritaka Land and the 1991 remix album The Moritaka.

Moritaka re-recorded the song and uploaded the video on her YouTube channel on January 25, 2014. This version is also included in Moritaka's 2014 self-covers DVD album Love Vol. 6. In addition, she recorded a newer version titled "Mi-ha (2015 Ver.)", which was uploaded on YouTube on June 12, 2015 and included in Love Vol. 9.

== Track listing ==
All lyrics are written by Chisato Moritaka; all music is composed and arranged by Hideo Saitō.

7-inch vinyl/8 cm CD
No.	Title	Length
1.	"The Mi-ha (Special Mi-ha Mix)" (Za Mīhā (Supesharu Mīhā Mikkusu) (ザ・ミーハー (スペシャル・ミーハー・ミックス)))	5:52
2.	"Mi-ha (Original Version)" (Mīhā (Orijinaru Vājon) (ミーハー (オリジナル・ヴァージョン)))	4:54

Cassette
No.	Title	Length
1.	"The Mi-ha (Special Mi-ha Mix)"
2.	"Mi-ha (Original Version)"
3.	"The Mi-ha (Special Mi-ha Mix)" (Karaoke)
4.	"Mi-ha (Original Version)" (Karaoke)

== Personnel ==
- Chisato Moritaka – vocals, timbales
- Hideo Saitō – guitar, backing vocals, drum and synthesizer programming
- Nobita Tsukada – keyboards, synthesizer programming
- Misa Nakayama – backing vocals

== Charts ==
Chart (1988)	Peak position
Japanese Oricon Singles Chart	29

== Cover versions ==
- Taiwanese singer An Ke Li covered the song in Mandarin Chinese as "Dāi Dāi de Nǚhái" (呆呆的女孩; lit. "Dumb Girl") in her 1989 debut album Niánqīng Dàodǐ (年輕到底; Young to the End).

== See also ==
- 1988 in Japanese music
