= New Season (song) =

1987 song by Chisato Moritaka

Single by Chisato Moritaka

from the album New Season
- Language: Japanese
- B-side: Period (EP/CT); Overheat Night (CD)
- Released: May 25, 1987 (EP/CT); March 25, 1988 (CD)
- Recorded: 1987
- Genre: J-pop; pop rock
- Length: 4:41
- Label: Warner Pioneer
- Composer: Hideo Saitō
- Lyricist: HIRO
- Producer: Yūzō Shimada

Chisato Moritaka singles chronology
"New Season" (1987)	"Overheat Night" (1987)

Music video
- New Season on YouTube

"New Season" (ニューシーズン, Nyū Shīzun) is the debut single by Japanese singer Chisato Moritaka. Written by HIRO and Hideo Saitō, the single was released by Warner Pioneer on March 25, 1987. The song was used as the theme song of the 1987 Toho film Aitsu ni Koishite, which also featured Moritaka's acting debut. It was also featured in the Fuji TV drama special Gakuen Jōhōbu H.I.P. (ガクエン情報部H.I.P.; School Information Department H.I.P.), also starring Moritaka.

== Background ==
Shortly after winning the first Pocari Sweat Image Girl Contest in 1986, Moritaka moved from Kumamoto to Tokyo to begin her entertainment career. A team of songwriters led by Hiromasa Ijichi (using the pseudonym "HIRO") and Hideo Saitō were brought in to compose materials for her debut album (also titled New Season), as she had not yet experimented on writing her own songs.

In the music video, as well as earlier live performances, Moritaka played percussion and the keyboard solo; she has since focused only on vocals on the song.

The single was re-released on mini CD format on March 25, 1988, with "Overheat Night" replacing "Period" as the B-side.

== Chart performance ==
"New Season" peaked at No. 23 on Oricon's singles chart and sold 44,000 copies.

== Other versions ==
"New Season" was remixed for the 1989 greatest hits album Moritaka Land.

Moritaka re-recorded the song on vocals and drums and uploaded the video on her YouTube channel on December 22, 2012. This version is also included in Moritaka's 2013 self-covers DVD album Love Vol. 3.

== Track listing ==
All lyrics are written by HIRO, except where indicated; all music is composed and arranged by Hideo Saitō.

7-inch vinyl
No.	Title	Length
1.	"New Season"	4:41
2.	"Period" (Piriodo (ピリオド))	4:04

Cassette
No.	Title	Length
1.	"New Season"	4:41
2.	"Period"	4:04
3.	"New Season" (Karaoke)	4:41
4.	"Period" (Karaoke)	4:04

8 cm CD
No.	Title	Lyrics	Length
1.	"New Season"		4:41
2.	"Overheat Night" (Ōbāhīto Naito (オーバーヒート・ナイト))	Hiromasa Ijichi	4:53

== Personnel ==
- Chisato Moritaka – vocals, keyboard
- Hideo Saitō – guitar, backing vocals
- Nobita Tsukada – keyboards
- Yasuhiko Fukuda – keyboards
- Chiharu Mikuzugi – bass
- Reuben Tsujino – drums
- Yukari Fujio – backing vocals

== Charts ==
Chart (1987)	Peak position
Japanese Oricon Singles Chart	23

== See also ==
- 1987 in Japanese music
