= Yoru no Entotsu =

1984 single by Carnation

Single by Carnation
- Language: Japanese
- English title: Night Chimney
- B-side: "Cameraman no Helicopter"
- Released: November 1984
- Genre: J-pop; pop rock; new wave
- Label: Nagomu Records
- Songwriter: Masataro Naoe
- Producer: Masataro Naoe

Carnation singles chronology
| "Yoru no Entotsu" (1984) | "It's a Beautiful Day" (1995) |

"Yoru no Entotsu" (夜の煙突; lit. "Night Chimney") is the debut single by Japanese rock band Carnation. Written by band founder Masataro Naoe, the single was released independently in November 1984. The band re-recorded the song for the CD release of their 1988 album Gong Show. They once again re-recorded the song in 2004 as the B-side of their 20th anniversary single "Angel".

== Track listing ==
All lyrics are written by Masataro Naoe; all music is composed by and arranged by Masataro Naoe.

| No. | Title | Length |
|---|---|---|
| 1. | "Yoru no Entotsu" ((夜の煙突; "Night Chimney")) |
| 2. | "Cameraman no Helicopter" (Kameraman no Herikoputā (カメラマンのヘリコプター; "The Helicopter Cameraman")) |
| 3. | "Cow" |

== Chisato Moritaka version ==
"Yoru no Entotsu"

Song by Chisato Moritaka

from the album Hijitsuryokuha Sengen
- Language: Japanese
- English title: Night Chimney
- Released: July 25, 1989
- Genre: J-pop; pop rock; new wave
- Length: 4:49
- Label: Warner Pioneer
- Songwriter: Masataro Naoe
- Producer: Yukio Seto

Music video
- "Yoru no Entotsu" on YouTube

"Yoru no Entotsu" was covered by Japanese singer/songwriter Chisato Moritaka in her 1989 album Hijitsuryokuha Sengen, based on Carnation's 1988 re-recording. Though it was never released as a single, the song has been a regular staple in Moritaka's live set list. The music video features Moritaka performing the song with Carnation.

For the 2013 Carnation tribute album Nande Kimi wa Boku yori Boku no Koto Kuwashii no?, Moritaka and Carnation re-recorded the song; this time, with Moritaka supplying the drum tracks. This version is also available in her 2015 self-covers DVD Love Vol. 8. She uploaded the promo video on her YouTube channel on September 7, 2014.

== Other cover versions ==
- Nantyara Idol covered the song in 2020. The single also includes Carnation's 1988 version of the song as the B-side.
