= Carnation (Japanese band) =

Japanese band

Carnation カーネーション
- Origin: Tokyo, Japan
- Genres: Rock; pop rock; new wave
- Years active: 1983–present
- Labels: Nagomu Records; Tokuma Japan; Nippon Columbia; Cutting Edge; Hurricane Records; Cosmic Sea Records; Nippon Crown
- Members: Masahiro Naoe; Yuzuru Ōta
- Past members: Hiroshi Yabe; Yūichi Tanaya; Osamu Toba; Yūji Mada; Jirō Bandō; Masayuki Tokunaga; Tetsurō Ogumi; Kōichi Tanino
- Website: carnation-web.com

Carnation (カーネーション, Kānēshon) is a Japanese rock band founded by Masahiro Naoe in 1983. During their heyday, they were dubbed "the Japanese XTC" due to their similar styles.

== History ==
Masahiro Naoe (then known as Masataro Naoe) formed the band Jibiinkōka (耳鼻咽喉科; lit. "Otolaryngology") in 1981. In December 1983, the band was renamed "Carnation" and released their first independent single "Yoru no Entotsu" a year later. The band released their first full album Young Wise Men in 1988. Within the same year, the band left the independent scene and signed with Tokuma Japan. The band participated in the production of J-pop idol Chisato Moritaka's 1989 album Hijitsuryokuha Sengen, which features her cover of "Yoru no Entotsu". In addition, Moritaka provided guest vocals on the band's 1991 album Elec.King. Naoe continued to contribute to Moritaka's other releases throughout the first half of the 1990s.

The band signed with Nippon Columbia in 1994, with their album Edo River becoming popular with FM stations. They hosted a successful concert at Shibuya Public Hall in 1997. The band switched to Cutting Edge Records in 2003, but left two years later when Naoe formed his own label Hurricane Records.

In 2013, the tribute album Nande Kimi wa Boku yori Boku no Koto Kuwashii no? (なんできみはぼくよりぼくのことくわしいの?; lit. What's More About Me Than Me?) was released to celebrate Carnation's 30th anniversary. The album features contributions by Moritaka, Yasuyuki Okamura, and others. Three years later, Carnation signed with Nippon Crown. The band celebrated its 35th anniversary with their "Sunset Monsters" concert at the Hibiya Open-Air Concert Hall.

== Members ==
=== Current members ===
- Masahiro Naoe (直枝 政広, Naoe Masahiro) – lead vocals, guitar (1983–present)

- Formerly known as Masataro Naoe (直枝 政太郎, Naoe Masataro)

- Yuzuru Ōta (大田 譲, Ōta Yuzuru) – bass, backing vocals (1992–present)

=== Former members ===
- Hiroshi Yabe (矢部 浩志, Yabe Hiroshi) – drums, percussion (1985–2009)
- Yūichi Tanaya (棚谷 祐一, Tanaya Yūichi) – keyboards, backing vocals (1987–2002)
- Osamu Toba (鳥羽 修, Toba Osamu) – guitar (1991–2002)
- Yūji Mada (馬田 裕次, Mada Yūji) – bass, backing vocals (1983–1991)
- Jirō Bandō (坂東 次郎, Bandō Jirō) – guitar, backing vocals (1984–1990)
- Masayuki Tokunaga (徳永 雅之, Tokunaga Masayuki) – drums, percussion (1983–1985)
- Tetsurō Ogumi (小汲 哲郎, Ogumi Tetsurō) – saxophone
- Kōichi Tanino (谷野 晃一, Tanino Kōichi) – keyboards

== Discography ==
=== Singles ===
- "Yoru no Entotsu" (夜の煙突; "Night Chimney") (September 1984)
- "It's a Beautiful Day" (August 15, 1995)
- "Sekai no Hate made Tsuretette yo" (世界の果てまでつれてってよ; "Take It to the End of the World") (January 20, 1996)
- "Great Nostalgia" (グレイト・ノスタルジア) (April 20, 1996)
- "Garden City Life" (July 20, 1996)
- "Superman" (October 10, 1996)
- "No Goodbye" (February 21, 1997)
- "New Morning" (September 20, 1997)
- "Aisuru Kotoba -Summer Children-" (愛する言葉 -Summer Children-) (July 1, 1998)
- "Tanondaze Baby" (たのんだぜベイビー) (January 30, 1999)
- "Real Man" (September 1, 1999)
- "Koisuru Tame ni Boku wa Umarete Kitan da" (恋するためにぼくは生まれてきたんだ; "I Was Born to Fall in Love") (January 21, 2000)
- "Angel" (May 13, 2004)
- "Ace of Spades" (スペードのエース, Supēdo no Ēsu) (August 11, 2004)
- "Kemonotachi" (獣たち; "Beasts") (July 6, 2005)
- "Renaissance" (ルネッサンス) (July 6, 2005)
- "Lady Lemonade" (July 6, 2005)
- "Wild Fantasy" (April 2007)
- "Jason" (ジェイソン) (April 15, 2009)
- "Adamski" (アダムスキー) (December 26, 2014)

=== Albums ===
- Duck Boat (February 21, 1986)
- Young Wise Men (March 25, 1988)
- Gong Show (August 25, 1988)
- Elec.King (エレキング) (May 25, 1991)
- Tengoku to Jigoku (天国と地獄; Heaven and Hell) (August 25, 1992)
- Edo River (August 21, 1994)
- A Beautiful Day (August 19, 1995)
- Girl Friend Army (August 21, 1996)
- Booby (September 20, 1997)
- Parakeet & Ghost (February 10, 1999)
- Love Sculpture (February 19, 2000)
- Living/Loving (August 27, 2003)
- Super Zoo! (November 25, 2004)
- Wild Fantasy (July 26, 2006)
- Velvet Velvet (November 25, 2009)
- Sweet Romance (September 19, 2012)
- Multimodal Sentiment (July 13, 2016)
- Suburban Baroque (September 13, 2017)
- Turntable Overture (November 17, 2021)
- Carousel Circle (November 29, 2023)

=== Mini albums ===
- Musashino EP (ムサシノep) (March 21, 1998)
- Venture Business Vol. 01 (October 16, 2002)
- Venture Business Vol. 02 (December 10, 2002)
- Venture Business Vol. 03 (March 11, 2003)
- Utopia (November 16, 2011)

=== Live albums ===
- Wacky Packages (November 21, 1994)
- 505 ~ Five Oh! Five ~ (April 10, 2002)
- Runnin' Wild Live (September 21, 2005)
- Carnation Wild Fantasy Tour 2006 (November 29, 2006)
- The Sounds of Rock Love (October 3, 2007)
- Carnation Billboard Live 2015 (Live Direct) "A Beautiful Day" 20th Anniversary Live (August 22, 2015)

=== Compilations ===
- Mellow My Mind (July 29, 1987)
- Spy for the Band (Singles + More) (September 21, 2000)
- Carnation Is the Great R&R Band! ~C-Side of Carnation~ (August 25, 2004)
- The Very Best of Carnation "Long Time Traveller" (June 20, 2018)

=== Boxed sets ===
- Early Years Box (April 17, 2013)
