= Orquesta de la Luz =

Japanese salsa band

Orquesta de la Luz オルケスタ・デ・ラ・ルス
- Origin: Tokyo, Japan
- Genre: Salsa
- Years active: 1984–1997; 2002–present
- Labels: BMG Victor; Dynaware; BMG Funhouse; Avex IO; BookRidge; Universal Music Nayutawave; SME Records; Amazon Records; King Records
- Members: Nora; Jin; Yoshiro Suzuki; Yoshi Iba; Yu Sato; Takuya Saito; Kazutoshi Shibuya; Isao Sakuma; Yasushi Gotanda; Daisuke Maeda; Hitoshi Aikawa
- Website: laluz.jp

Orquesta de la Luz (オルケスタ・デ・ラ・ルス, Orukesuta de ra Rusu; lit. "Orchestra of the Light") is a Japanese salsa band that was formed in 1984, and began performing and recording in 1989. The band sings in Spanish and is led by vocalist Nora Suzuki, who returned to traditional salsa after the band broke up in the mid-1990s. It became widely famous in Latin America, particularly in the Dominican Republic, Colombia, Puerto Rico, Panama, Mexico, Peru, Venezuela and other Caribbean area countries. Orquesta de La Luz was usually 12 in number, whose main focal point (and only consistent member throughout their tenure together) was singer Nora. Throughout the years, Nora was joined by a rotating cast of musicians in the group, including Gen Ogimi, percussion; Carlos Kanno, percussion; Genichi Egawa, timbales; Gen Date, conga; Hiroshi Sawada, bass; Satoru Shoinoya, piano, keyboards; Shiro Sasaki, trumpet; Tatsuya Shimogami, trumpet; Yoshihito Fukumoto, trumpet; Hideaki Nakaji, trombone; and Taisei Aoki, trombone, while co-producer/arranger Sergio George contributed keyboards from time to time. The group built a substantial following in their homeland during the early to mid-1990s (with such releases as 1990's Orquesta de La Luz, 1991's Sin Fronteras, and 1992's Somos Diferentes, before switching their sound primarily to jazz and ballads. By 1995, Orquesta de La Luz had broken up, with Nora launching a solo career shortly thereafter (and returning to her former band's early salsa sound).

== Timeline ==
In the Autumn of 1984 Orquesta De La luz was formed. The band's first live performance was at Harajuku. The band performed live performances on a regular basis, mainly in live houses in Tokyo. Two years later the band produced a demonstration tape that led to an eventual opportunity in New York.

In 1988, Nora brought the demonstration tape to New York agent (Ritchie Bonilla) and took the opportunity to perform live in New York City. A year later Orquesta De La Luz went on their first New York tour, with the member's own expense, four years after forming. They signed a contract for the CD debut which was praised greatly by local people.

In the summer of 1990 on June 21 The band debuted with BMG Victor (now BMG fan house) with its 1st album "De La Luz". In August of the same year the band released the same album from RMM nationwide which earned the Gold Disc Award. The following month Nora performed a September National Tour of 18 performances including New York, Boston, Miami and Puerto Rico. The New York Times acknowledged the band on September 11 as a sensation. The band debuted an album released in Latin America in October and the following month in November won first place in the US Billboard magazine Latin chart and remained there for 11 consecutive weeks.

In the winter of 1991 in February, the band debut album was released in Spain. The album won "Best Album of the Year" at the March NY Critics Association Award (Ace Awards). in April Qrquesta De La Luz toured and performed 14 times in Central and South America in Venezuela, Martinique, French Guiana, Panama, Aruba, Curaçao to name a few to 83,000 people. In The summer - June 21 the bands 2nd album "Salsa No Tiene Frontera" was release. Two months later in August, the band went on a World Tour performing 21 concerts in the United States of America, Spain, Mexico, and more to over 81,700 people. That same month, on August 27, the band released its 2nd album in the United States witch also earned the Gold Disc Award. In December Orquesta De La Luz was awarded the 33rd "Japan Record Awards" A Special Award.

Starting in February 1992, the band had a 20 performance World Tour beginning in the United States, Martinique, Guadeloupe and Spain followed in March in Saint Martin and Curaçao to over 185,000 people. Awards won this year were "Best Album of the Year" and "Best of the Year" at the March NY Critics Association Award (Ace Awards). In June, Hibiya Nozono, Osaka Shiroino sound, held a salsa festival presided over De La Luz. In July the band went on its European tour in France, the Netherlands, Spain and more. In Spain, Nora appeared as representative of Japan on Seville Expo Japan Day. on July 22 the 3rd album "Somos Diferentes" released domestically. the following month on August 25, the same album released in the United States. In the following three months September–November, the band performed another World Tour which included the United States, Colombia, Chile, Mexico, Costa Rica and Japan.

In February 1993 Orquesta De La Luz appeared on Jay Leno's The Tonight Show on NBC. On June 5, the band held concerts in France, Netherlands, Italy, Spain, the United Kingdom. In July, the band transfer overseas distribution from RMM to BMG International. On September 1 the band's Best album "Historia De La Luz" is released in 37 countries around the world. In September 10, the band received the United Nations Peace Prize. The Mayor of New York, awarded the certificate for the "NY Ace Award." In the months of September and October the ban performed 14 tours of the World Tour which included the United States, Peru, Puerto Rico, Colombia to more than 64,400 people. In November the band held its Japan Tour (Tokyo Welfare Pension with 13 live performances. On November 5, President Bill Clinton, President of the United States awarded a letter of appreciation. November 21 the bands 4th album "La Aventura" was released worldwide. On New Year's Eve - December 31 - the band appeared in the 44th NHK "Kohaku Utagoe Fight" and won the 35th Special Record Award.

In February 1994, the band had 8 concerts in its US tour (USA, Puerto Rico, Curaçao to more than 42,250 people. In April, the band co-starred with Carlos Santana at Earth Day Concert at Nippon Budokan. In August and September, the band again toured in the United States, Mexico and Puerto Rico. the ban was Santana's concert opening act in San Francisco. On November 2, Orquesta De La Luz Christmas album "Feliz Christmas" was released.

In February 1995, the band was nominated for a Grammy Award for "Best Tropical Latin Album" category. On May 24 the band released its 5th album "Sabor De La Luz". In September, the band went on a US-Mexican tour which included New York, Houston, Boston, Puerto Rico and Mexico.

in March 1996, the band performed in The "100th anniversary of Japanese immigrants to Hawaii". In July the band decided to suspend group activities for some time.

In July 1997, An agreement was made to focused on the solo activities of the members and the band decided to dissolve the group. On July 14, Orquesta De La Luz performed a "Final Sayonara" concert at Akasaka Blitz.

== Discography ==
=== Albums ===
- De La Luz (1990) CD - BMG Victor
- Salsa No Tiene Frontera (1991) CD - BMG Victor
- Somos Diferentes (1992) CD - BMG Victor
- Historia De La Luz (1993) CD - BMG Victor
- La Aventura (1993) CD - BMG Victor
- Feliz Christmas (1994) CD - BMG Victor
- Sabor De La Luz (1995) CD - BMG Victor
- Final Concert ¡Adios Amigos! (1998) CD - Dynaware
- The Best Of Orquesta De La Luz (2000) CD - BMG Victor
- ¡Banzaaay! (2004) CD - Avex Io
- Arco Iris (2005) CD - Avex Io
- Let's Salsa!! - The Best Salsa Dance Collection - Album (2007) CD - BMG Funhouse
- ¡Caliente! (2008) CD - BookRidge Records
- Ron Viejo (2009)
- Very Best of Orquesta de la Luz (2010)
- Billboard Live 2015 (2015)
- Gracias Salseros (2019)

=== Singles ===
- La Puerta (Yukihiro Fukutomi Remix) / Carnaval (Kyoto Jazz Massive Edit) / Carnaval (original mix) (2006) 12" vinyl - Avex Io

== Album charts ==
Year	Chart	Album	Peak
1990	Billboard Tropical/Salsa	Salsa Caliente del Japón	1
1991	Billboard Tropical/Salsa	Sin Fronteras	6
1992	Billboard Tropical/Salsa	Somos Diferentes	13
