= Hideo Saitō (musician, born 1958) =

Japanese musician & composer (born 1958)

Hideo Saitō 斉藤英夫
- Born: May 30, 1958 (age 67); Tokyo, Japan
- Genres: J-pop; city pop; pop rock; dance-pop; folk-pop
- Instrument: Guitar
- Years active: 1980–present

Hideo Saitō (Japanese: 斉藤 英夫, Hepburn: Saitō Hideo; born May 30, 1958), is a Japanese musician and composer, best known for his collaborations with Chisato Moritaka from 1987 to 1995. He is also the producer of the musical cat group Musashi's.

== Career ==
After graduating from Keio University, Saitō formed the band "You" in 1980 before pursuing a career as a music producer. Since his work on Chisato Moritaka's debut album New Season, he has composed more than 60 songs for her. He has also played guitar in over 1,000 recordings for different artists. In 1993, Saitō became the first Japanese composer to release songs in South Korea.

Saitō served as a judge in the NTV talent show Uta Star!! (歌スタ!!, Uta Suta!!; Song Star!!) from 2005 to 2010. There, he discovered Koji Higashino on the March 3, 2010, episode. In June 2010, Saitō joined keyboardist Minoru Mukaiya and vocalist Keizo Nakanishi in the band Mukaiya Club (向谷倶楽部, Mukaiya Kurabu) as guitarist and producer. In November 2013, Saitō produced the song "Voice", which was recorded by 23 musicians in 14 countries to support the victims of the 2011 Tōhoku earthquake and tsunami.

== Notable artists ==
=== As a composer ===
Mami Ayukawa

Cute

- "Kono Machi"

D-51

Yui Kano

Noriko Katō

- "Kondo Watashi Doko ka Tsurete itte Kudasai yo"

KinKi Kids

- "Tabiji ~You're My Buddy~"

Mei Kurokawa

Hiroko Moriguchi

Chisato Moritaka

Miho Nakayama

- "Megamitachi no Bōken"

Rimi Natsukawa

Reiko Ōmori

Ken'ya Ōsumi

Pistol Valve

Hekiru Shiina

- "Koi"
- "Ride a Wave"

Kiyotaka Sugiyama

Tokio

- "Spicy Girl"

Yuki Uchida

Wink

- "Tasty"

=== As a musician ===
- Steffanie Borges
- Joe Hisaishi
- Masahiko Kondō
- Yoko Minamino
- Hibari Misora
- Rie Miyazawa
- Miho Morikawa
- Miyuki Nakajima
- Akina Nakamori
- Yōko Oginome
- Ribbon
- Kenji Sawada
- Shonentai
- Keiko Terada
- Takuro Yoshida

== Awards and nominations ==
Year	Award	Category	Nominee/work	Result
1992	34th Japan Record Awards	Best New Artist	Noriko Katō: "Kondo Watashi Doko ka Tsurete itte Kudasai yo"	Nominated
1993	35th Japan Record Awards	Arrangement Award	Chisato Moritaka: "Watarasebashi"	Nominated
