= Hiromasa Ijichi =

Japanese composer and music producer (born 1963)

- Born: 26 April 1963 (age 62); Tokyo, Japan
- Genres: J-pop
- Occupation(s): Composer, music producer
- Years active: 1987–present
- Website: y-net.internetcorners.net

Hiromasa Ijichi (伊秩 弘将, Ijichi Hiromasa; born 26 April 1963) is a Japanese composer and music producer. Most of his compositions are sung by the Japanese girl group Speed.
