= Chisato Moritaka discography =

- Studio albums: 13
- EPs: 2
- Live albums: 1
- Compilation albums: 7
- Singles: 40
- Video albums: 56 (Note: This includes the music video compilation albums and concert DVDs.)
- Music videos: 39 (Note: This does not include the alternate versions of some music videos.)
- Remix albums: 3
- Collaborations: 2
- Karaoke albums: 1
- Video games: 3
- Exclusive releases: 3

The discography of Japanese singer-songwriter Chisato Moritaka consists of thirteen studio albums, seven compilation albums, and forty singles released since 1987.

== Albums ==
=== Studio albums ===
Title	Album details	Peak chart positions	Sales	Certifications
Title	Album details	JPN	Sales	Certifications
New Season	Released: July 25, 1987; Label: Warner Pioneer; Formats: LP, CD, cassette	21	JPN: 43,000	
Mi-ha	Released: March 25, 1988; Label: Warner Pioneer; Formats: LP, CD, cassette	17	JPN: 72,000	
Mite	Released: November 17, 1988; Label: Warner Pioneer; Formats: LP, CD, cassette	5	JPN: 66,000	
Hijitsuryokuha Sengen	Released: July 25, 1989; Label: Warner Pioneer; Formats: CD, cassette	2	JPN: 216,000	RIAJ: Gold
Kokon Tozai	Released: October 17, 1990; Label: Warner Pioneer; Formats: CD, cassette	1	JPN: 354,000	RIAJ: Gold
Rock Alive	Released: March 25, 1992; Label: Warner Music Japan; Formats: CD, cassette	3	JPN: 314,000	RIAJ: Platinum
Pepperland	Released: November 18, 1992; Label: Warner Music Japan; Formats: CD, cassette	5	JPN: 197,000	RIAJ: Gold
Lucky 7	Released: May 10, 1993; Label: Warner Music Japan; Formats: CD, cassette	3	JPN: 421,000	RIAJ: Platinum
Step by Step	Released: July 25, 1994; Label: One Up Music; Formats: CD, cassette	3	JPN: 573,000	RIAJ: Platinum
Taiyo	Released: July 15, 1996; Label: One Up Music; Formats: CD, cassette	3	JPN: 386,000	RIAJ: Platinum
Peachberry	Released: July 16, 1997; Label: One Up Music; Formats: CD	4	JPN: 322,000	RIAJ: Gold
Kotoshi no Natsu wa More Better	Released: May 21, 1998; Label: Zetima; Formats: CD, LP	10	JPN: 62,000	
Sava Sava	Released: September 9, 1998; Label: Zetima; Formats: CD	7	JPN: 92,000	

=== Live albums ===
Title	Album details	Peak chart positions
Title	Album details	JPN
YouTube Public Recording & Live at Yokohama Blitz	Released: May 15, 2013; Label: Up-Front Works; Formats: CD+DVD	69
Kono Machi Tour 2019 (Live at Sendai Sun Plaza Hall, 2019.12.21)	Released: April 23, 2021; Label: Warner Music Japan; Formats: Streaming	—

=== Compilation albums ===
Title	Album details	Peak chart positions	Sales	Certifications
Title	Album details	JPN	Sales	Certifications
Do the Best	Released: March 25, 1995; Label: One Up Music; Formats: CD, cassette, MD	2	JPN: 1,340,000	RIAJ: Million
The Best Selection of First Moritaka 1987–1993	Released: February 15, 1999; Label: WEA Japan; Formats: CD	6	JPN: 74,000	
Harvest Time	Released: November 25, 1999; Label: WEA Japan; Formats: CD	82	JPN: 3,000	
My Favorites	Released: November 26, 2004; Label: zetima; Formats: CD	71	JPN: 7,000	
Best	Released: 2004; Label: Warner Music Japan; Formats: CD	—		
Best & Best	Released: 2004; Label: Warner Music Japan; Formats: CD	—		
Super Best Collection	Released: March 9, 2011; Label: Warner Music Japan; Formats: CD	—		
Super Best	Released: December 21, 2011; Label: Ivy Records; Formats: CD	—		
Chisato Moritaka Best 1993–1999	Released: 2011; Label: Up-Front Works; Formats: CD	—		
The Singles	Released: August 8, 2012; Label: Warner Music Japan; Formats: CD	5		
UHQCD The First Best Selection '87~'92	Released: November 25, 2015; Label: Warner Music Japan; Formats: CD	103		
UHQCD The First Best Selection '93~'99	Released: November 25, 2015; Label: zetima; Formats: CD	111		

=== Extended plays ===
Title	Album details	Peak chart positions	Sales
Title	Album details	JPN	Sales
Let's Go!	Released: February 25, 1997; Label: Sha-Lee-See; Formats: CD, cassette	22	JPN: 24,000

=== Remix albums ===
Title	Album details	Peak chart positions	Sales	Certifications
Title	Album details	JPN	Sales	Certifications
Moritaka Land	Released: December 10, 1989; Label: Warner Pioneer; Formats: CD, cassette	2	JPN: 313,000	RIAJ: Platinum
The Moritaka	Released: July 10, 1991; Label: Warner Pioneer; Formats: CD, cassette, LP	2	JPN: 353,000	RIAJ: Platinum
Mix Age	Released: November 3, 1999; Label: zetima; Formats: CD	30	JPN: 15,000	

=== Collaborations ===
Title	Album details
Chisato Moritaka with tofubeats: Moritaka Tofu	Released: December 17, 2014; Label: Warner Music Japan; Formats: CD
Hyamikao/Foetus Traum (Collaboration with Soichi Terada and Sekitova)	Released: January 31, 2016; Label: Wasabeat; Formats: EP

=== Karaoke albums ===
Title	Album details
Chisato Moritaka Original Hit Karaoke Collection - The Karaoke Vol. 1	Released: August 25, 1992; Label: Warner Music Japan; Formats: CD

== Singles ==
=== Regular singles ===
List of singles, with selected chart positions
Title	Year	Peak chart positions	Sales (JPN)	Certifications	Album
Title	Year	JPN	Sales (JPN)	Certifications	Album
"New Season"	1987	23	44,000		New Season
"Overheat Night"	1987	24	22,000		Mi-ha
"Get Smile"	1988	28	14,000		Mi-ha
"The Mi-ha"	1988	29	29,000		Mi-ha
"Alone"	1988	25	26,000		Mite
"The Stress"	1989	19	40,000		Mite
"17-sai"	1989	8	195,000		Hijitsuryokuha Sengen
"Daite"	1989	8	57,000		Hijitsuryokuha Sengen
"Michi"/"Seishun"	1990	5	164,000		Moritaka Land
"Kusai Mono ni wa Futa wo Shiro"	1990	4	117,000		The Moritaka
"Ame"	1990	2	180,000	RIAJ: Gold	Kokon Tozai
"Benkyō no Uta"/"Kono Machi"	1991	4	184,000	RIAJ: Gold	The Moritaka
"Hachigatsu no Koi"	1991	6	106,000		The Moritaka
"Fight!"	1991	10	269,000	RIAJ: Gold	Rock Alive
"Concert no Yoru"	1992	7	104,000		Rock Alive
"Watashi ga Obasan ni Natte mo"	1992	15	228,000	RIAJ: Gold	Rock Alive
"Watarasebashi"/"Writer Shibō"	1993	9	310,000	RIAJ: Gold	Lucky 7
"Watashi no Natsu"	1993	5	382,000	RIAJ: Platinum	Lucky 7
"Hae Otoko"/"Memories"	1993	12	136,000	RIAJ: Gold	Lucky 7
"Kaze ni Fukarete"	1993	1	381,000	RIAJ: Gold	Step by Step
"Rock'n Omelette"	1994	13	100,000		Do the Best
"Kibun Sōkai"	1994	3	438,000	RIAJ: Platinum	Step by Step
"Natsu no Hi"	1994	5	409,000	RIAJ: Platinum	Step by Step
"Suteki na Tanjōbi"/"Watashi no Daiji na Hito"	1994	1	380,000	RIAJ: Gold	Do the Best
"Futari wa Koibito"	1995	5	444,000	RIAJ: Platinum	Do the Best
"Yasumi no Gogo"	1995	5	219,000	RIAJ: Gold	Taiyo
"Jin Jin Jingle Bell"	1995	2	253,000	RIAJ: Gold	Non-album single
"So Blue"	1996	7	270,000	RIAJ: Gold	Taiyo
"La La Sunshine"	1996	5	179,000	RIAJ: Gold	Taiyo
"Gin'iro no Yume"	1996	9	236,000	RIAJ: Gold	Peachberry
"Let's Go!"	1997	19	93,000	RIAJ: Gold	Peachberry
"Sweet Candy"	1997	10	93,000		Peachberry
"Miracle Light"	1997	20	30,000		Kotoshi no Natsu wa More Better
"Snow Again"	1997	9	134,000		Sava Sava
"Denwa"	1998	17	58,000		Sava Sava
"Umi made 5-fun"	1998	20	32,000		Sava Sava
"Tsumetai Tsuki"	1998	33	14,000		Non-album single
"Watashi no Yō ni"	1999	37	11,000		mix age*
"Mahiru no Hoshi"	1999	41	23,000		Non-album single
"Ichido Asobi ni Kite yo '99"	1999	60	7,000		mix age*
"La La Sunshine"	2008	—			Non-album single
"Ame"/"Watarasebashi"	2009	—			Non-album single
"Overheat Night (Extended Mix)"	2019	80			Non-album single
"—" denotes releases that did not chart.

=== Promotional singles ===
List of singles, with selected chart positions
Title	Date	Album
"My Anniversary" (Nissay exclusive)	1997	Peachberry

=== Collaboration singles ===
List of singles, with selected chart positions
Title	Year	Peak chart positions	Album
Title	Year	JPN	Album
"Don't Stop the Music" (Collaboration with tofubeats)	2013	26	Chisato Moritaka with tofubeats: Moritaka Tofu

== Other recordings ==
As a featured artist

Release date	Work	Song	Notes
July 7, 1999	"Suichū Megane"/"Tanabata no Yoru, Kimi ni Aitai" single	"Tanabata no Yoru, Kimi ni Aitai" (七夕の夜、君に逢いたい; "I Want to Meet You on Tanabata Night")	Chappie's third single.
September 12, 1999	Dear Yuming	"Ano Hi ni Kaeritai" (あの日にかえりたい; "I Want to Return to Those Days")	Yumi Matsutoya tribute album.
October 29, 1999	Fujiya Co.	"Peko-chan no Uta" (ペコちゃんの歌; "Peko-chan's song")	Released to commemorate the 100th anniversary of Fujiya Co.
May 2007	Nissan	"LaLaLa Driving LaLaLa Lafesta" (ラララ ドライビング ラララ ラフェスタ)	Nissan Lafesta commercial jingle.
September 25, 2013	"Kumamonmon" single	"Kumamonmon" (くまモンもん)	Kumamon theme song.
December 18, 2013	Nande Kimi wa Boku yori Boku no Koto Kuwashii no?	"Yoru no Entotsu" (夜の煙突; "Night Chimney")	Carnation tribute album.
July 23, 2014	Lindberg Tribute ~Minna no Lindberg~	"Believe in Love"	Lindberg tribute album.
December 23, 2020	Egao no Uta ~ Minna no Kokoro ni Nokoru Suteki na Kyoku, Kokoro ni Sotto Yorisou Uta ~	"Kibun Sōkai"/"Watarasebashi"	Various artists album.
August 26, 2026	Pink Lady Legend, Now and Forever	"Pepper Keibu" (ペッパー警部, Peppā Keibu; "Inspector Pepper") (with Maki Watase)	Pink Lady tribute album.

As a guest artist

Release date	Artist	Work	Song	Notes
October 25, 1990	Yuichi Takahashi	Kaze	"Koi wa Norikonasenai Mono" (恋は乗りこなせないもの; "Love Can't Handle")	Chorus
May 25, 1991	Carnation	Elec.King	"Mōretsuna Hito Mōretsuna Koi" (モーレツな人 モーレツな恋; "Bodacious People, Bodacious Love")	Duet; alternate version of Moritaka's song "Uchi ni Kagitte Son'na Koto wa nai Hazu" from Kokon Tozai.
May 25, 1994	Haruhiko Andō	Kimi wo Kowashitai	"Kimi wo Kowashitai" (君を壊したい; I Will Destroy You) "Kiss"	Drums
July 21, 1995	Shigeru Izumiya	Tsuioku no Eight Beat	"True Love" (トゥルーラブ, Turū Rabu)	Vocals, chorus
July 25, 1998	Shigeru Izumiya	Watashi ni wa Yume ga Aru	(Unknown)	Drums; both Moritaka and Todd Roper (Cake) were credited in the album, but not on specific tracks.
December 18, 1996	Sharam Q	Golden Q	"White" (ホワイト, Howaito)	Additional drums
February 19, 1997	L⇔R	"Aine Kleine Nacht Music"	"Son'na Kibun ja nai (Jam Taste Version)" (そんな気分じゃない "JAM TASTE Version"; "I Don't Feel Like That (Jam Taste Version)")	Drums on chorus, fills on refrain.
May 25, 1997	Towa Tei	Sound Museum	"Tamilano"	Sampling drum breaks
April 2, 2005	Towa Tei	Flash	"Sometime Samurai"	Drums
September 21, 1997	Chara	Junior Sweet	"Shimashima no Bambi" (しましまのバンビ; "Striped Bambi")	Drums
November 1, 1997	Takuro Yoshida & Love Love All Stars	Min'na Daisuki	"Waga Yoki Tomo yo" (我が良き友よ; "My Good Friend")	Drums
September 30, 1998	Shuichi "Ponta" Murakami	Welcome to My Life	"Welcome to My Rhythm (Kon'na Oira ni Dare ga Shita)" (WELCOME TO MY RHYTHM [こんなオイラに誰がした]) "Arashi wo Yobu Otoko" (嵐を呼ぶ男; "The Man who Calls the Storm")	Solo drums
May 21, 1999	COIL	Kurukuru Fetish	"Kurukuru Fetish" (クルクル フェチ, Kurukuru Fechi)	Drums
August 21, 1999	George Tokoro	Sentaku Dassui	"Koi no Uta" (恋の唄; "Love Song")	Drums
October 28, 2009	Junichi Inagaki	Otoko to On'na 2	"Ame" (雨; "Rain")	Duet; cover of Moritaka's 1990 single.
November 22, 2010	Aya Matsuura	Click You Link Me	"Watarasebashi" (渡良瀬橋; "Watarase Bridge")	Chorus, alto recorder; cover of Moritaka's 1993 single.
April 9, 2011	Ganbarou Nippon Ai wa Katsu Singers	Ai wa Katsu (愛は勝つ; Love Wins)	"Ai wa Katsu"	Vocals
August 7, 2013	Various artists (Chisato Moritaka x Shigeru Izumiya)	Shōwa no Uta yo, Arigatō	"Kanashikute Yarikirenai" (悲しくてやりきれない; "Unbearably Sad")	Duet
August 7, 2013	Various artists (Aki Yashiro x Shigeru Izumiya)	"Yoru ni Tsumazuki" (夜につまづき; "Stumbling at Night")	Drums	
September 7, 2016	Various artists (Shoko Aida & Chisato Moritaka)	The Peanuts Tribute Songs	"Jōnetsu no Hana" (情熱の花; "Passion Flower")	Vocals

As a songwriter

Release date	Artist	Song	Co-writer	Arrangement	Notes
January 25, 1991	Yuichi Takahashi	"Kumori Sora" (くもり空; "Cloudy Sky")	Yuichi Takahashi (music)	Yuichi Takahashi	
July 25, 1992	Noriko Katō	"Hikisakanaide Futari wo" (引き裂かないで二人を; "Don't Tear Us Apart")	Hideo Saitō (music)	Hideo Saitō	B-side of "Kondo Watashi Doko ka Tsurete itte Kudasai yo" single
August 1, 1994	Gen Takayama	"Nemurasete" (眠らせて; "Let Me Sleep")	Eiji Takino (lyrics)	Toshirō Imaizumi	
November 23, 1994	Ayako Shimizu	"13 Tsuki no Ame 〜 Semete Ame ga Yamu made 〜" (13月の雨〜せめて雨が止むまで〜; "13 Months of Rain ~ At Least Until the Rain Stops ~")	Eiji Takino (lyrics)	Kei Wakakusa	
April 26, 1995	Sanae Johnouchi	"Shiawase ni Narimasu" (幸せになります; "Be Happy")	Hideo Saitō (music)	Hideo Saitō	
July 26, 1995	Gen Takayama	"Kokoro no Tobira" (心の扉; "The Door to the Heart")	Eiji Takino (lyrics)	Toshirō Imaizumi	
September 21, 1995	Akiko Wada	"Saa Bōken da" (さあ冒険だ; "Join the Adventure")	Shigesato Itoi (co-lyrics); Carl Smoky Ishii (music)	Kome Kome Club	
July 23, 1999	Country Musume	"Futari no Hokkaido" (二人の北海道; "Two People in Hokkaido")	Tsunku (music)	Yasuaki Maejima	
November 30, 1999	Country Musume	"Yuki Geshiki" (雪景色; "Snow Scene") "Yuki da Yori" (雪だより; "News from the Snow")	Tsunku (music)	Yuichi Takahashi	

== Videography ==
=== Music videos ===
List of music videos, showing year released and video albums
Year	Title	Video album
1987	"New Season"	Mite
1987	"Overheat Night"	Overheat Night (CDV); The Stress (LD)
1988	"Get Smile"	Mi-ha (CDV); The Stress (LD)
1988	"The Mi-ha"	The Mi-ha (VHS); Mite (LD)
1988	"Alone"	Mite
1989	"The Stress"	The Stress
1989	"17-sai"	17-sai
1989	"Daite (Las Vegas Version)"	17-sai
1989	"Yoru no Entotsu"	17-sai
1990	"Michi"	Kusai Mono ni wa Futa wo Shiro!!
1990	"Kusai Mono ni wa Futa wo Shiro!!"	Kusai Mono ni wa Futa wo Shiro!!
1991	"The Busters Blues"	Kusai Mono ni wa Futa wo Shiro!!
1991	"Benkyō no Uta"	Rock Alive
1991	"Hachigatsu no Koi"	Rock Alive
1992	"Rock Alive"	Rock Alive
1992	"The Blue Blues"	Rock Alive
1992	"Mitsuketa no Saifu"	Rock Alive
1993	"Watarasebashi"	Kibun Sōkai
1993	"Watashi no Natsu"	Kibun Sōkai
1993	"Hae Otoko" (Long Version)	Kibun Sōkai
1993	"Kaze ni Fukarete"	Kibun Sōkai
1994	"Rock'n Omelette"	Kibun Sōkai
1994	"Kibun Sōkai"	Kibun Sōkai
1994	"Natsu no Hi"	Kibun Sōkai
1994	"Suteki na Tanjōbi"	Kibun Sōkai
1995	"Futari wa Koibito"	Moritaka Video Clips "Five"
1995	"Yasumi no Gogo"	Moritaka Video Clips "Five"
1996	"So Blue"	Moritaka Video Clips "Five"
1996	"La La Sunshine"	Moritaka Video Clips "Five"
1996	"Gin'iro no Yume"	Moritaka Video Clips "Five"
1997	"Let's Go"	Moritaka Video Clips "Five"
1997	"Sweet Candy"	Moritaka Video Clips "Five"
1997	"Miracle Light"	Moritaka Video Clips "Five"
1997	"Snow Again"	Moritaka Video Clips "Five"
1998	"Denwa"	Moritaka Video Clips "Five"
1998	"Tokyo Rush"	Moritaka Video Clips "Five"
1998	"Umi Made 5-fun"	Moritaka Video Clips "Five"
1998	"Tsumetai Tsuki"	Chisato Moritaka DVD Collection No. 15
1999	"Watashi no Yō ni"	Chisato Moritaka DVD Collection No. 15

As a featured artist

List of music videos, showing year released and video albums
Year	Title	Video album
2013	"Don't Stop the Music" (tofubeats featuring Chisato Moritaka)	N/A

Other versions

1. "Michi" (Chisato-hime no Bōken)
2. "Futari wa Koibito" (Color Version)

=== Music video albums ===
List of media, with selected chart positions
Title	Album details	Peak positions		Sales (Oricon)
Title	Album details	JPN DVD	JPN Blu-ray	Sales (Oricon)
Mi-ha	Released: April 25, 1988; Label: Warner Pioneer; Formats: CDV	—	—	N/A
The Mi-ha	Released: September 10, 1988; Label: Warner Pioneer; Formats: VHS	—	—	N/A
Overheat Night	Released: November 28, 1988; Label: Warner Pioneer; Formats: CDV	—	—	N/A
Mite	Released: November 28, 1988; Label: Warner Pioneer; Formats: LD, VHS	—	—	N/A
The Stress	Released: April 25, 1989; Label: Warner Pioneer; Formats: LD, VHS	—	—	N/A
17-sai	Released: November 10, 1989; Label: Warner Pioneer; Formats: LD, VHS	—	—	N/A
Kusai Mono ni wa Futa wo Shiro!!	Released: March 25, 1991; Label: Warner Pioneer; Formats: LD, VHS	—	—	N/A
Rock Alive	Released: June 25, 1992; Label: Warner Music Japan; Formats: LD, VHS	—	—	N/A
Kibun Sōkai	Released: November 30, 1994; Label: One Up Music; Formats: LD, VHS	—	—	N/A
Moritaka Video Clips "Five"	Released: September 9, 1998; Label: zetima; Formats: LD, VHS	—	—	N/A
Chisato Moritaka DVD Collection No. 5: Mite/The Stress/17-sai	Released: September 27, 2000; Label: Warner Music Japan; Formats: DVD	—	—	N/A
Chisato Moritaka DVD Collection No. 6: Kusai Mono ni Wa Futa wo Shiro!!/Rock Alive	Released: September 27, 2000; Label: Warner Music Japan; Formats: DVD	—	—	N/A
Chisato Moritaka DVD Collection No. 9: Kibun Sōkai	Released: October 18, 2000; Label: zetima; Formats: DVD	—	—	N/A
Chisato Moritaka DVD Collection No. 13: Five	Released: December 20, 2000; Label: zetima; Formats: DVD	—	—	N/A
Debut 25th Anniversary Project: Chisato Moritaka Self Cover Series "Love" Vol. 1	Released: December 4, 2013; Label: Up-Front Works; Formats: DVD+CD	107	—	N/A
Debut 25th Anniversary Project: Chisato Moritaka Self Cover Series "Love" Vol. 2	Released: December 4, 2013; Label: Up-Front Works; Formats: DVD+CD	118	—	N/A
Debut 25th Anniversary Project: Chisato Moritaka Self Cover Series "Love" Vol. 3	Released: December 4, 2013; Label: Up-Front Works; Formats: DVD+CD	115	—	N/A
Debut 25th Anniversary Project: Chisato Moritaka Self Cover Series "Love" Vol. 4	Released: December 4, 2013; Label: Up-Front Works; Formats: DVD+CD	138	—	N/A
Debut 25th Anniversary Project: Chisato Moritaka Self Cover Series "Love" Vol. 5	Released: September 3, 2014; Label: Up-Front Works; Formats: DVD+CD	58	—	N/A
''Debut 25th Anniversary Project: Chisato Moritaka Self Cover Series "Love" Vol. 6	Released: September 3, 2014; Label: Up-Front Works; Formats: DVD+CD	61	—	N/A
Debut 25th Anniversary Project: Chisato Moritaka Self Cover Series "Love" Vol. 7	Released: March 18, 2015; Label: Up-Front Works; Formats: DVD+CD	78	—	N/A
Debut 25th Anniversary Project: Chisato Moritaka Self Cover Series "Love" Vol. 8	Released: March 18, 2015; Label: Up-Front Works; Formats: DVD+CD	79	—	N/A
Debut 25th Anniversary Project: Chisato Moritaka Self Cover Series "Love" Vol. 9	Released: October 21, 2015; Label: Up-Front Works; Formats: DVD+CD	50	—	N/A
Watarasebashi Complete Version	Released: September 15, 2017; Label: Warner Music Japan; Formats: Blu-ray+CD, Blu-ray+CD+EP box set	—	15	N/A
Debut 25th Anniversary Project: Chisato Moritaka Self Cover Series "Love" Vol. 10	Released: October 23, 2017; Label: Up-Front Works; Formats: DVD+CD	32	—	N/A

=== Live video albums ===
List of media, with selected chart positions
Title	Album details	Peak positions		Sales (Oricon)
Title	Album details	JPN DVD	JPN Blu-ray	Sales (Oricon)
Get Smile - Live at Nihon Seinenkan	Released: March 25, 1988; Label: Warner Pioneer; Formats: LD, VHS	—	—	N/A
Mite Special Live at Shiodome PIT II 4.15'89	Released: June 25, 1989; Label: Warner Pioneer; Formats: LD, VHS	—	—	N/A
The Third Live Video Hijitsuryokuha Sengen	Released: March 10, 1990; Label: Warner Pioneer; Formats: LD, VHS	—	—	N/A
Kokon Tozai ~ Oni ga Deru ka Hebi ga Deru ka Tour Live Video Vol. 4	Released: June 17, 1991; Label: Warner Pioneer; Formats: LD, VHS	—	—	N/A
Live Rock Alive	Released: February 25, 1993; Label: Warner Music Japan; Formats: LD, VHS	—	—	N/A
Lucky 7 Live	Released: February 25, 1994; Label: One Up Music; Formats: LD, VHS	—	—	N/A
1996 "Do the Best" at Yokohama Arena	Released: July 25, 1996; Label: One Up Music; Formats: LD, VHS	—	—	N/A
"Taiyo" On & Off	Released: March 10, 1997; Label: One Up Music; Formats: LD, VHS	—	—	N/A
1997 Peachberry Show	Released: February 15, 1998; Label: One Up Music; Formats: LD, VHS	—	—	N/A
1998 Sava Sava Tour	Released: April 14, 1999; Label: zetima; Formats: LD, VHS	—	—	N/A
Chisato Moritaka DVD Collection No. 1: Get Smile - Live at Nihon Seinenkan	Released: August 23, 2000; Label: Warner Music Japan; Formats: DVD	—	—	N/A
Chisato Moritaka DVD Collection No. 2: Mite Special Live at Shiodome PIT II 4.15'89	Released: August 23, 2000; Label: Warner Music Japan; Formats: DVD	—	—	N/A
Chisato Moritaka DVD Collection No. 3: The Third Live Video Hijitsuryokuha Sengen	Released: August 23, 2000; Label: Warner Music Japan; Formats: DVD	—	—	N/A
Chisato Moritaka DVD Collection No. 4: Kokon Tozai ~ Oni ga Deru ka Hebi ga Deru ka Tour Live Video Vol. 4	Released: August 23, 2000; Label: Warner Music Japan; Formats: DVD	—	—	N/A
Chisato Moritaka DVD Collection No. 7: Live Rock Alive	Released: October 18, 2000; Label: zetima; Formats: DVD	—	—	N/A
Chisato Moritaka DVD Collection No. 8: Lucky 7 Live	Released: October 18, 2000; Label: zetima; Formats: DVD	—	—	N/A
Chisato Moritaka DVD Collection No. 10: 1996 "Do the Best" Live at Yokohama Arena	Released: November 22, 2000; Label: zetima; Formats: DVD	—	—	N/A
Chisato Moritaka DVD Collection No. 11: "Taiyo" On & Off	Released: November 22, 2000; Label: zetima; Formats: DVD	—	—	N/A
Chisato Moritaka DVD Collection No. 12: 1997 Peachberry Show	Released: November 22, 2000; Label: zetima; Formats: DVD	—	—	N/A
Chisato Moritaka DVD Collection No. 14: 1998 Sava Sava Tour	Released: December 20, 2000; Label: zetima; Formats: DVD	—	—	N/A
Moritaka Land Tour 1990.3.3 at NHK Hall	Released: September 18, 2013; Label: Warner Music Japan; Formats: DVD+2CD, Blu-ray+2CD, Blu-ray+DVD+3CD box set	32	5	N/A
Kokon Tozai ~ Oni ga Deru ka Hebi ga Deru ka Tour '91 ~ Kanzen-han	Released: September 17, 2014; Label: Warner Music Japan; Formats: DVD+2CD, Blu-ray+2CD, 2Blu-ray+2CD	83	13	N/A
Chisato Moritaka in 1990	Released: May 27, 2015; Label: Warner Music Japan; Formats: 2DVD+CD, 2Blu-ray+CD, 2Blu-ray+CD box set	64	27	N/A
The Moritaka Tour 1991.8.22 at Shibuya Public Hall	Released: July 26, 2017; Label: Warner Music Japan; Formats: DVD+2CD, Blu-ray+2CD, 2Blu-ray+3CD+2LP box set	80	28	N/A
30th Anniversary Final Project "The Singles" Day 1・Day 2 Live 2018 Complete Version	Released: May 22, 2019; Label: Warner Music Japan; Formats: 2DVD, 2Blu-ray	9	7	N/A
Kono Machi Tour 2019	Released: August 26, 2020; Label: Warner Music Japan; Formats: 2DVD, Blu-ray, 3DVD+2CD, 2Blu-ray+2CD	12	12	N/A
Chisato Moritaka Live 2020	Released: July 28, 2021; Label: Up-Front Works; Formats: 3Blu-ray	—	35	N/A
Live Rock Alive Complete	Released: November 23, 2022; Label: Warner Music Japan; Formats: DVD+2CD, Blu-ray+2CD, 2Blu-ray+3CD	—	19	N/A
Kono Machi Tour 2020–22	Released: October 18, 2023; Label: Warner Music Japan; Formats: DVD+CD, Blu-ray+CD	12	8	N/A
Kondo wa More Better yo! 2023–24	Released: October 2, 2024; Label: Warner Music Japan; Formats: 2DVD, 2Blu-ray, 2DVD+4CD, 2Blu-ray+4CD	7	8	N/A
Let's Go Go! Tour 2024.12.3 at Zepp DiverCity	Released: March 26, 2025; Label: Warner Music Japan; Formats: DVD, Blu-ray, 2DVD+2CD, Blu-ray+2CD	15	—	N/A
2025 Chisato Moritaka Concert Tour: Anata mo Watashi mo Fight!!	Released: March 11, 2026; Label: Zetima; Formats: 2DVD, 2Blu-ray, 2DVD+4CD, 2Blu-ray+4CD	6	9	N/A

As a guest artist

No.	Title	Main artist	Release date	Notes
1	Pacific Heaven at Yokohama Arena	Pacific Heaven Club Band	January 2001	Chisato Moritaka Fan Club exclusive release on VHS. Recorded live at Yokohama Arena on August 24, 1999, featuring Stardust Revue, Kan, East Cloud, Something Else, Chère, and Temiyan.
2	Cute Budokan Concert 2013: Queen of J-pop ~ Tadori Tsuita On'na Senshi ~	Cute	December 18, 2013	Recorded live at Nippon Budokan on September 10, 2013.
3	35th Anniversary Stardust Revue Dai Enkai ~ 6-hour Large Collaboration Live ~	Stardust Revue	January 31, 2018	Recorded live at Saitama Super Arena on May 20, 2017.

=== Exclusive releases ===
No.	Title	Label	Release date	Notes
1	Chisato Moritaka DVD Collection No. 15	Warner Music Japan / zetima	2001	Mail-order exclusive release for those who purchased the first edition releases of DVD Collection Nos. 1-14.
2	Live House Tour 1998 sa va sa va	zetima	January 31, 2002	Chisato Moritaka Fan Club exclusive release on DVD and VHS. Recorded live at Akasaka Blitz on October 12, 1998.
3	Love Vol. 11 Special DVD	Up-Front Works	February 1, 2018	Online exclusive release for those who purchased all 10 volumes of the Love DVD series.

== Video games ==
List of video games
Title	Platform(s)	Game details
Watarasebashi	PC, MAC, Pippin	Released: December 20, 1995 (CD-ROM); 1996 (Pippin); Publisher: Oracion
Watarasebashi/La La Sunshine	Sega Saturn	Released: September 11, 1997; Publisher: Oracion/Sega
Safari Tokyo	PC, MAC, PlayStation	Released: October 26, 1998 (CD-ROM); October 22, 1998 (PS1); Publisher: Oracion/Koei
