= 30th Anniversary Final Project "The Singles" Day 1·Day 2 Live 2018 Complete Version =

Video by Chisato Moritaka
- Released: May 22, 2019
- Recorded: May 27–28, 2018
- Venue: Hitomi Memorial Hall; Setagaya, Tokyo, Japan
- Language: Japanese
- Label: Warner Music Japan
- Producer: Yukio Seto

Chisato Moritaka chronology
Love Vol. 10 (2017)	30th Anniversary Final Project "The Singles" Day 1·Day 2 Live 2018 Complete Version (2019)	Kono Machi Tour 2019 (2020)

Music video
- 30th Anniversary Final Project "The Singles" Day 1·Day 2 Live 2018 Complete Version trailer on YouTube

30th Anniversary Final Project "The Singles" Day 1·Day 2 Live 2018 Complete Version (30周年Final企画「ザ·シングルス」Day1·Day2 LIVE 2018 完全版) is a live video by Japanese singer-songwriter Chisato Moritaka. Recorded live at the Hitomi Memorial Hall in Setagaya, Tokyo on May 27 to 28, 2018, the video was released on May 22, 2019, by Warner Music Japan on Blu-ray and DVD formats, each offered with an optional photobook. In addition, RecoChoku offered limited edition releases of the video containing four CDs and an original poster. The video features Moritaka performing her 2012 compilation album The Singles in its entirety as the final stage of her 30th anniversary celebration.

The video peaked at No. 7 on Oricon's Blu-ray chart and at No. 9 on Oricon's DVD chart.

== Track listing ==
All lyrics are written by Chisato Moritaka, except where indicated; all music is composed by Hideo Saitō, except where indicated.

Disc 1: Day 1 – May 27, 2018
No.	Title	Lyrics	Music	Length
1.	"New Season"	HIRO
2.	"Overheat Night" (Ōbāhīto Naito (オーバーヒート·ナイト))	Hiromasa Ijichi
3.	"Get Smile"	Ijichi	Ken Shima
4.	"The Mi-ha (Special Mi-ha Mix)" ("Za Mīhā (Supesharu Mīhā Mikkusu)" (ザ·ミーハー (スペシャル･ミーハー·ミックス)))
5.	"Alone" (Arōn (アローン))		Shinji Yasuda
6.	"The Stress -Stress Chūkintō Version-" (Za Sutoresu -Sutoresu Chūkintō Bājon- (ザ·ストレス -ストレス 中近東バージョン-; "The Stress -Stress Middle East Version-"))
7.	"17-sai" (Jūnana-sai (17才; "17 Years Old"))	Mieko Arima	Kyōhei Tsutsumi
8.	"Daite (Las Vegas Version)" (Daite (Rasu Begasu Vājon) (だいて (ラスベガス·ヴァージョン); "Hold Me (Las Vegas Version)"))		Yuichi Takahashi
9.	"Michi" ((道; "Road"))		Yasuda
10.	"Seishun" ((青春; "Youth"))
11.	"Kusai Mono ni wa Futa wo Shiro!!" ((臭いものにはフタをしろ!!; "Shut Your Stinking Trap!!"))
12.	"Ame" ((雨; "Rain"))		Seiji Matsuura
13.	"Benkyō no Uta" ((勉強の歌; "Study Song"))
14.	"Kono Machi (Home Mix)" ((この街（HOME MIX）; "This Town (Home Mix)"))
15.	"Hachigatsu no Koi" ((八月の恋; "Love in August"))		Tsutsumi
16.	"Fight!!" (Faito!! (ファイト!!))		Takahashi
17.	"Concert no Yoru" (Konsāto no Yoru (コンサートの夜; "Concert Night"))
18.	"Watashi ga Obasan ni Natte mo" ((私がオバさんになっても; "Even If I Become an Old Lady"))
19.	"Watarasebashi" ((渡良瀬橋; "Watarase Bridge"))
20.	"Writer Shibō" (Raitā Shibō (ライター志望; "Writer's Aspirations"))
21.	"Watashi no Natsu" ((私の夏; "My Summer"))
22.	"Memories"
23.	"Hae Otoko" ((ハエ男; "Fly Man"))		Moritaka
24.	"Kaze ni Fukarete" ((風に吹かれて; "Blowing in the Wind"))
25.	"Mite (Encore)" ((見て; "Look"))

Disc 2: Day 2 – May 28, 2018
No.	Title	Music	Length
1.	"Rock'n Omelette" (Rokkun Omuretsu (ロックン·オムレツ))	Ijichi
2.	"Kibun Sōkai" ((気分爽快; "Refreshing"))	Kenichi Kurosawa
3.	"Natsu no Hi" ((夏の日; "Summer Day"))
4.	"Suteki na Tanjōbi" ((素敵な誕生日; "A Lovely Birthday"))	Takahashi
5.	"Watashi no Daiji no Hito (Single Version)" (Watashi no Daiji no Hito (Shinguru Vājon) (私の大事な人 (シングル·ヴァージョン); "My Important Person (Single Version)"))	Moritaka
6.	"Futari wa Koibito" ((二人は恋人; "We Are a Pair of Lovers"))
7.	"Yasumi no Gogo" ((休みの午後; "Holiday Afternoon"))
8.	"Jin Jin Jingle Bell" (Jin Jin Jinguru Beru (ジン ジン ジングルベル))	Moritaka
9.	"So Blue"	Ijichi
10.	"La La Sunshine" (Ra Ra Sanshain (ララ サンシャイン))	Ijichi
11.	"Gin'iro no Yume" ((銀色の夢; "The Silver Colored Dream"))	Ijichi
12.	"Let's Go!"	Ijichi
13.	"Sweet Candy"	Takahashi
14.	"Miracle Light" (Mirakuru Raito (ミラクルライト))	Harry Hosono
15.	"Snow Again"	Takahashi
16.	"Denwa" ((電話; "Telephone"))	Takahashi
17.	"Umi made 5-fun" (Umi made Go-fun (海まで5分; "5 Minutes to the Sea"))	Toshinobu Kubota
18.	"Tsumetai Tsuki" ((冷たい月; "Cold Moon"))	Takahashi
19.	"Watashi no Yō ni" ((私のように; "Like Me"))	Shin Kono
20.	"Mahiru no Hoshi" ((まひるの星; "Midday Star"))	Shikao Suga
21.	"Ichido Asobi ni Kite yo '99" ((一度遊びに来てよ'99; "Come Out and Play '99"))
22.	"Teriyaki Burger (Encore)" (Teriyaki Bāgā (テリヤキ·バーガー))

Bonus tracks
No.	Title	Music	Length
1.	"The Moritaka + Live Encore #2 Medley (May 18, 2018)" ("Kusai Mono ni wa Futa wo Shiro!!"/"The Mi-ha"/"Hae Otoko")	Saitō; Moritaka
2.	"45 Singles Live Video Digest"

== Personnel ==
- Chisato Moritaka – vocals, alto recorder
- Yuichi Takahashi – guitar
- Maria Suzuki – guitar
- Daisuke Sakurai – keyboards
- Masafumi Yokoyama – bass
- Toshiyuki Takao – drums

== Charts ==
Chart (2019)	Peak position
Blu-Ray Disc Chart (Oricon)	7
DVD Chart (Oricon)	9
