= The Singles (Chisato Moritaka album) =

Compilation album by Chisato Moritaka
- Released: August 8, 2012
- Recorded: 1987–1999
- Genre: J-pop; pop rock; dance-pop; folk-pop
- Language: Japanese
- Label: Warner Music Japan
- Producer: Yukio Seto

Chisato Moritaka chronology
My Favorites (2004)	The Singles (2012)	YouTube Public Recording & Live at Yokohama Blitz (2013)

The Singles (ザ・シングルス, Za Shingurusu) is a compilation album by Japanese singer-songwriter Chisato Moritaka, released on August 8, 2012, by Warner Music Japan to commemorate the 25th anniversary of her music career, as well as her return to the music industry after her retirement in 1999. The three-disc album compiles all of Moritaka's singles from 1987 to 1999. A special edition release includes a 48-page photo booklet.

The album peaked at No. 5 on Oricon and Billboard Japan's albums charts.

To commemorate Moritaka's 35th anniversary, Warner Music Japan released The Singles on global streaming media platforms on June 25, 2022. The release is split in two digital albums: The Singles 1987–1992 (which covers songs from "New Season" to "Watashi ga Obasan ni Natte mo") and The Singles 1993–1999 (which covers songs from "Watarasebashi" to "Ichido Asobi ni Kite yo '99").

== Track listing ==
All lyrics are written by Chisato Moritaka, except where indicated; all music is composed and arranged by Hideo Saitō, except where indicated.

Disc 1 (1987–1991)
No.	Title	Lyrics	Music	Arrangement	Length
1.	"New Season"	HIRO			4:41
2.	"Overheat Night" (Ōbāhīto Naito (オーバーヒート・ナイト))	Hiromasa Ijichi			4:56
3.	"Get Smile"	Ijichi	Ken Shima		4:18
4.	"The Mi-ha (Special Mi-ha Mix)" (Za Mīhā (Supesharu Mīhā Mikkusu) (ザ・ミーハー (スペシャル･ミーハー・ミックス)))				5:53
5.	"Alone" (Arōn (アローン))		Shinji Yasuda	Yasuda	4:23
6.	"The Stress -Stress Chūkintō Version-" (Za Sutoresu -Sutoresu Chūkintō Bājon- (ザ・ストレス -ストレス 中近東バージョン-; "The Stress -Stress Middle East Version-"))				4:53
7.	"17-sai" (Jūnana-sai (17才; "17 Years Old"))	Mieko Arima	Kyōhei Tsutsumi		4:54
8.	"Daite (Las Vegas Version)" (Daite (Rasu Begasu Vājon) (だいて (ラスベガス・ヴァージョン); "Hold Me (Las Vegas Version)"))		Yuichi Takahashi	Takahashi	5:00
9.	"Michi" ((道; "Road"))		Yasuda		4:54
10.	"Seishun" ((青春; "Youth"))				4:31
11.	"Kusai Mono ni wa Futa wo Shiro!!" ((臭いものにはフタをしろ!!; "Shut Your Stinking Trap!!"))				2:42
12.	"Ame" ((雨; "Rain"))		Seiji Matsuura		4:31
13.	"Benkyō no Uta" ((勉強の歌; "Study Song"))				4:40
14.	"Kono Machi (Home Mix)" ((この街（HOME MIX）; "This Town (Home Mix)"))				4:47
15.	"Hachigatsu no Koi" ((八月の恋; "Love in August"))		Tsutsumi		4:09
Total length:					69:20

Disc 2 (1991–1995)
No.	Title	Music	Arrangement	Length
1.	"Fight!!" (Faito!! (ファイト!!))	Takahashi	Takahashi	5:00
2.	"Concert no Yoru" (Konsāto no Yoru (コンサートの夜; "Concert Night"))			4:47
3.	"Watashi ga Obasan ni Natte mo" ((私がオバさんになっても; "Even If I Become an Old Lady"))			4:16
4.	"Watarasebashi" ((渡良瀬橋; "Watarase Bridge"))			3:47
5.	"Writer Shibō" (Raitā Shibō (ライター志望; "Writer's Aspirations"))			3:58
6.	"Watashi no Natsu" ((私の夏; "My Summer"))			4:19
7.	"Hae Otoko" ((ハエ男; "Fly Man"))	Moritaka		3:53
8.	"Memories"			5:20
9.	"Kaze ni Fukarete" ((風に吹かれて; "Blowing in the Wind"))			4:46
10.	"Rock'n Omelette" (Rokkun Omuretsu (ロックン・オムレツ))	Ijichi		2:30
11.	"Kibun Sōkai" ((気分爽快; "Refreshing"))	Kenichi Kurosawa	Takahashi	3:58
12.	"Natsu no Hi" ((夏の日; "Summer Day"))			3:44
13.	"Suteki na Tanjōbi" ((素敵な誕生日; "A Wonderful Birthday"))	Takahashi	Takahashi	4:08
14.	"Watashi no Daiji no Hito" (Watashi no Daiji no Hito (Shinguru Vājon) (私の大事な人 (シングル・ヴァージョン); "My Important Person (Single Version)"))	Moritaka	Yasuaki Maejima	3:26
15.	"Futari wa Koibito" ((二人は恋人; "We Are a Pair of Lovers"))			4:14
Total length:				62:14

Disc 3 (1995–1999)
No.	Title	Music	Arrangement	Length
1.	"Yasumi no Gogo" ((休みの午後; "Holiday Afternoon"))			4:40
2.	"Jin Jin Jingle Bell" (Jin Jin Jinguru Beru (ジン ジン ジングルベル))	Moritaka	Takahashi	3:42
3.	"So Blue"	Ijichi	Takahashi	4:36
4.	"La La Sunshine" (Rara Sanshain (ララ サンシャイン))	Ijichi	Takahashi	3:42
5.	"Gin'iro no Yume" ((銀色の夢; "The Silver Colored Dream"))	Ijichi	Takahashi	4:04
6.	"Let's Go!"	Ijichi	Takahashi	4:24
7.	"Sweet Candy"	Takahashi	Takahashi	4:55
8.	"Miracle Light" (Mirakuru Raito (ミラクルライト))	Haruomi Hosono	Hosono	3:38
9.	"Snow Again"	Takahashi	Takahashi	4:24
10.	"Denwa" ((電話; "Telephone"))	Takahashi	Takahashi	3:55
11.	"Umi made 5-fun" (Umi made Go-fun (海まで5分; "5 Minutes to the Sea"))	Toshinobu Kubota	Maejima	4:14
12.	"Tsumetai Tsuki" ((冷たい月; "Cold Moon"))	Takahashi	Takahashi	4:26
13.	"Watashi no Yō ni" ((私のように; "Like Me"))	Shin Kono	Kōno	5:04
14.	"Mahiru no Hoshi" ((まひるの星; "Midday Star"))	Shikao Suga	Takahashi	4:35
15.	"Ichido Asobi ni Kite yo '99" ((一度遊びに来てよ'99; "Come Out and Play '99"))		Maejima	5:00
Total length:				65:27

== Charts ==
Chart (2012)	Peak position
Japanese Top Albums (Billboard)	5
Japanese Albums (Oricon)	5
