= Kondo wa More Better yo! 2023–24 =

Video by Chisato Moritaka
- Released: October 2, 2024
- Recorded: November 12, 2023 (Nagoya); July 2, 2024 (Tokyo)
- Venue: Aichi Prefectural Art Theater, Nagoya, Aichi, Japan (disc 1); Hitomi Memorial Hall, Setagaya, Tokyo, Japan (disc 2)
- Language: Japanese
- Label: Warner Music Japan
- Producer: Yukio Seto

Chisato Moritaka chronology
Kono Machi Tour 2020–22 (2023)	Kondo wa More Better yo! 2023–24 (2024)	Let's Go Go! Tour 2024.12.3 at Zepp DiverCity (2025)

Music video
- Official trailer on YouTube

Kondo wa More Better yo! 2023–24 (「今度はモアベターよ！」2023-24, Kondo wa Moa Betā yo! 2023-24; lit. This Time It's More Better! 2023-24) is a live video by Japanese singer-songwriter Chisato Moritaka. Recorded live at the Aichi Prefectural Art Theater in Nagoya on November 12, 2023, and at the Hitomi Memorial Hall in Setagaya, Tokyo on July 2, 2024, the video was released on October 2, 2024, by Warner Music Japan. The video is offered on Blu-ray and DVD formats, plus limited edition releases containing four audio CD versions of the concerts, two acrylic stands, a concert tour poster, and five photos.

The video peaked at No. 8 on Oricon's Blu-ray chart and No. 7 on Oricon's DVD chart.

== Track listing ==
All lyrics are written by Chisato Moritaka, except where indicated; all music is composed by Hideo Saitō, except where indicated.

Blu-ray/DVD Disc 1: Aichi Prefectural Art Theater, Nagoya (November 12, 2023)
No.	Title	Lyrics	Music	Length
1.	"Tokyo Rush (Kondo wa More Better yo! Ver.) (東京ラッシュ (今度はモアベターよ！Ver.); "Tokyo Rush (This Summer Will Be More Better! Ver.)")"	Haruomi Hosono	Hosono
2.	"Mi-ha (ミーハー, Mīhā)" (2015 Ver.)
3.	"Hijitsuryokuha Sengen (非実力派宣言; "Non-Proficiency Declaration")" (2023 Ver.)
4.	"Kaze ni Fukarete (風に吹かれて; "Blowing in the Wind")"
5.	"The Stress (ザ・ストレス, Za Sutoresu)"
6.	"Sonogo no Watashi (その後の私; "Me Afterwards")"
7.	"Shritagari / Overheat Night (しりたがり～オーバーヒート・ナイト, Shiritagari ~ Ōbāhīto Naito; "Curious" / "Overheat Night")"	Moritaka; Hiromasa Ijichi	Moritaka; Saitō
8.	"La La Sunshine (ララ サンシャイン, Ra Ra Sanshain)"		Ijichi
9.	"Futari wa Koibito (二人は恋人; "We Are Two Lovers")"
10.	"Yasumi no Gogo / Interlude Ver. B (休みの午後〜Interlude ver. B; "Holiday Afternoon")"
11.	"Teriyaki Burger (テリヤキ・バーガー, Teriyaki Bāgā)"
12.	"Watarasebashi (渡良瀬橋; "Watarase Bridge")"
13.	"Ame (Album Ver.) (雨 アルバムver.; "Rain" (Album Ver.))"		Seiji Matsuura
14.	"17-sai (Kondo wa More Better yo! Ver.) (17才 (今度はモアベターよ！ver.), Jūnana-sai (Kondo wa Moa Betā yo! Ver.); "17 Years Old (This Time It's More Better! Ver.)")"	Mieko Arima	Kyōhei Tsutsumi
15.	"Watashi ga Obasan ni Natte mo (私がオバさんになっても; "Even If I Become an Old Lady")"
16.	"La Marseillaise / Hae Otoko (Kondo wa More Better yo! Ver.) (ラ・マルセイエズ〜ハエ男 (今度はモアベターよ！ver.), Ra Maruseiezu ~ Hae Otoko (Kondo wa Moa Betā yo! Ver.); "La Marseillaise" / "Fly Man" (This Time It's More Better! Ver.))"		Claude Joseph Rouget de Lisle; Moritaka
17.	"Banana Chips (バナナチップス, Banana Chippusu)"	Naoko Yamano	Yamano
18.	"Yoru no Entotsu (夜の煙突; "Night Chimney")"	Masataro Naoe	Naoe
19.	"Ame Nochi Hare (雨のち晴れ; "Rain, Then Sun")"
20.	"Kibun Sōkai (気分爽快; "Refreshing") (January 2023 Zepp Ver.)" (Encore 1)		Kenichi Kurosawa
21.	"Don't Stop the Music" (Encore 2)	Tofubeats	Tofubeats
22.	"Kono Machi (この街; "This Town")" (Encore 3)
23.	"Concert no Yoru (コンサートの夜, Konsāto no Yoru; "Concert Night")" (Double Encore)

Blu-ray/DVD Disc 2: Hitomi Memorial Hall, Tokyo (July 2, 2024)
No.	Title	Lyrics	Music	Length
1.	"Tokyo Rush (Kondo wa More Better yo! Ver.)"	Hosono	Hosono
2.	"Natsu wa Paralleilon (16 Bars) (夏はパラレイロン(16bars), Natsu wa Parareiron (16 Bars); "Summer is a Paralleilon (16 Bars)")"		Ijichi
3.	"Modorenai Natsu (2024 Ver.) (戻れない夏 (2024ver.); "The Summer That Can't Return" (2024 Ver.))"	Kanon Kuwa	Ken Shima
4.	"Umi made 5-fun (海まで５分, Umi made Go-fun; "5 Minutes to the Sea")"		Toshinobu Kubota
5.	"La La Sunshine"		Ijichi
6.	"Futari wa Koibito"
7.	"Kondo Watashi Doko ka Tsurete itte Kudasai yo (今度私どこか連れていって下さいよ; lit. "Take Me Out Somewhere Next Time")"
8.	"Shritagari/Overheat Night"	Moritaka; Ijichi	Moritaka; Saitō
9.	"Natsu no Hi (夏の日; "Summer Day")"
10.	"Natsu no Umi (夏の海; "The Summer Sea")"		Yuichi Takahashi
11.	"Sweet Candy (Self-Cover Ver.) / Interlude Ver. E (SWEET CANDY (セルフカバーver.)〜Interlude ver. E)"		Takahashi
12.	"Teriyaki Burger"
13.	"Watarasebashi"
14.	"Ame (Album Ver.)"		Matsuura
15.	"17-sai (Summer 2024 Ver.) (17才 (2024夏ver.))"	Arima	Tsutsumi
16.	"Watashi ga Obasan ni Natte mo"
17.	"Anata wa Ninki Mono (あなたは人気者; "You Are a Popular Person")"		Shin Kono
18.	"Yoru no Entotsu"	Naoe	Naoe
19.	"Watashi no Natsu (私の夏; "My Summer")"
20.	"Kibun Sōkai (January 2023 Zepp Ver.)" (Encore 1)		Kurosawa
21.	"Seishun (青春; "Youth")" (Encore 2)
22.	"Kono Machi" (Encore 3)
23.	"Concert no Yoru" (Double Encore 1)
24.	"Ame Nochi Hare (雨のち晴れ; "Rain, Then Sun")" (Double Encore 2)

CD 1: Aichi Prefectural Art Theater, Nagoya (November 12, 2023)
No.	Title	Lyrics	Music	Length
1.	"Tokyo Rush" (Kondo wa More Better yo! Ver.)	Hosono	Hosono	2:54
2.	"Mi-ha" (2015 Ver.)			4:11
3.	"Hijitsuryokuha Sengen" (2023 Ver.)			4:29
4.	"Kaze ni Fukarete"			4:42
5.	"The Stress"			4:54
6.	"Sonogo no Watashi"			4:04
7.	"Shritagari"		Moritaka	0:41
8.	"Overheat Night"	Ijichi		4:35
9.	"La La Sunshine"		Ijichi	3:38
10.	"Futari wa Koibito"			4:11
11.	"Yasumi no Gogo"			5:02
12.	"Teriyaki Burger"			5:06
Total length:				48:22

CD 2: Aichi Prefectural Art Theater, Nagoya (November 12, 2023)
No.	Title	Lyrics	Music	Length
1.	"Watarasebashi"			3:35
2.	"Ame" (Album Ver.)		Seiji Matsuura	5:07
3.	"17-sai" (Kondo wa More Better yo! Ver.)	Arima	Tsutsumi	5:04
4.	"Watashi ga Obasan ni Natte mo"			4:47
5.	"La Marseillaise / Hae Otoko" (Kondo wa More Better yo! Ver.)		Rouget de Lisle; Moritaka	2:53
6.	"Banana Chips"	Yamano	Yamano	2:24
7.	"Yoru no Entotsu"	Naoe	Naoe	5:28
8.	"Ame Nochi Hare"			5:20
9.	"Kibun Sōkai" (January 2023 Zepp Ver.)		Kurosawa	4:18
10.	"Don't Stop the Music"	Tofubeats	Tofubeats	4:35
11.	"Kono Machi"			4:45
12.	"Concert no Yoru"			4:56
Total length:				53:08

CD 3: Hitomi Memorial Hall, Tokyo (July 2, 2024)
No.	Title	Lyrics	Music	Length
1.	"Tokyo Rush" (Kondo wa More Better yo! Ver.)	Hosono	Hosono	2:52
2.	"Natsu wa Paralleilon" (16 Bars)		Ijichi	0:29
3.	"Modorenai Natsu" (2024 Ver.)	Kuwa	Shima	4:10
4.	"Umi made 5-fun"		Kubota	4:14
5.	"La La Sunshine"		Ijichi	3:38
6.	"Futari wa Koibito"			4:16
7.	"Kondo Watashi Doko ka Tsurete itte Kudasai yo"			3:34
8.	"Shritagari"		Moritaka	0:41
9.	"Overheat Night"	Ijichi		4:33
10.	"Natsu no Hi"			3:39
11.	"Natsu no Umi"		Takahashi	4:49
12.	"Sweet Candy (Self-Cover Ver.) / Interlude Ver. E"		Takahashi	5:00
13.	"Teriyaki Burger"			5:06
Total length:				46:55

CD 4: Hitomi Memorial Hall, Tokyo (July 2, 2024)
No.	Title	Lyrics	Music	Length
1.	"Watarasebashi"			3:35
2.	"Ame" (Album Ver.)		Matsuura	5:04
3.	"17-sai" (Summer 2024 Ver.)	Arima	Tsutsumi	5:04
4.	"Watashi ga Obasan ni Natte mo"			4:42
5.	"Anata wa Ninki Mono"		Shin Kōno	4:53
6.	"Yoru no Entotsu"	Naoe	Naoe	5:51
7.	"Watashi no Natsu"			4:29
8.	"Kibun Sōkai" (January 2023 Zepp Ver.)		Kurosawa	4:16
9.	"Seishun"			4:24
10.	"Kono Machi"			4:38
11.	"Concert no Yoru"			4:53
12.	"Ame Nochi Hare"			5:26
Total length:				57:11

== Personnel ==
- Chisato Moritaka – vocals, alto recorder
- The White Queen

- Yuichi Takahashi – guitar
- Maria Suzuki – guitar
- Yu Yamagami – keyboards
- Masafumi Yokoyama – bass
- Akira Sakamoto – drums

== Charts ==
Chart (2024)	Peak position
Blu-Ray Disc Chart (Oricon)	8
DVD Chart (Oricon)	7
