= 2025 Chisato Moritaka Concert Tour: Anata mo Watashi mo Fight!! =

Video by Chisato Moritaka
- Released: March 11, 2026
- Recorded: October 12, 2025 (Disc 1); October 10, 2022 (Disc 2)
- Venue: Hitomi Memorial Hall, Setagaya, Tokyo, Japan (Disc 1); Toyosu Pit, Toyosu, Tokyo, Japan (Disc 2}
- Genre: J-pop; pop rock; dance-pop
- Length: 146 minutes (Disc 1); 142 minutes (Disc 2)
- Language: Japanese; Spanish
- Label: Zetima
- Producer: Yukio Seto

Chisato Moritaka chronology
Let's Go Go! Tour 2024.12.3 at Zepp DiverCity (2025)	2025 Chisato Moritaka Concert Tour: Anata mo Watashi mo Fight!! (2026)

2025 Chisato Moritaka Concert Tour: Anata mo Watashi mo Fight!! (2025 森高千里コンサートツアー“あなたも私もファイト!!”; 2025 Chisato Moritaka Concert Tour: "You and I Must Fight!!") is a live video by Japanese singer-songwriter Chisato Moritaka, released on March 11, 2026, by Zetima. The video consists of two discs; the first disc was recorded live at Hitomi Memorial Hall in Setagaya, Tokyo on October 12, 2025. The second disc is 2022 Chisato Moritaka 35th Anniversary: A Day in the Life (森高千里 35th Anniversary「a day in the life」), which was recorded live at the Toyosu Pit in Toyosu, Tokyo on October 10, 2022. The video is offered on Blu-ray and DVD formats, plus limited edition releases containing two audio CD versions of the concert and a photo booklet.

The video peaked at No. 6 on Oricon's DVD chart and No. 9 on Oricon's Blu-ray chart.

== Track listing ==
All lyrics are written by Chisato Moritaka, except where indicated; all music is composed by Hideo Saitō, except where indicated.

Blu-ray/DVD disc 1
No.	Title	Lyrics	Music	Length
1.	"New Season" (2025 Ver.)	Hiromasa Ijichi		6:06
2.	"Jimi na Onna (地味な女; "A Sober Woman")"			4:14
3.	"Benkyō no Uta (勉強の歌; "Study Song")"			4:50
4.	"Fight!! (ファイト！！, Faito!!)"		Yuichi Takahashi	4:59
5.	"Futari wa Koibito (二人は恋人; "We Are Two Lovers")"			4:21
6.	"Kaze ni Fukarete (風に吹かれて; "Blowing in the Wind")"			4:44
7.	"Suteki na Tanjōbi (素敵な誕生日; "A Wonderful Birthday")"		Takahashi	4:11
8.	"Rock'n Omelette (ロックン・オムレツ, Rokkun Omuretsu)"		Ijichi	2:51
9.	"Watarasebashi (渡良瀬橋; "Watarase Bridge")"			3:41
10.	"Writer Shibō (ライター志望; "A Writer's Aspirations")"			4:04
11.	"Kusai Mono ni wa Futa wo Shiro!! (臭いものにはフタをしろ！！; "Shut Your Stinkin' Trap!!")" (2025 Ver.)			2:36
12.	"Kaze wo Atsumete (風をあつめて; "Gathering the Wind")" (Happy End cover)	Takashi Matsumoto	Haruomi Hosono	4:18
13.	"Kibun Sōkai (気分爽快; "Refreshing")"		Kenichi Kurosawa	4:03
14.	"17-sai (17才, Jūnana-sai; "17 Years Old")" (2025 Ver.)	Mieko Arima	Kyōhei Tsutsumi	4:58
15.	"Watashi ga Obasan ni Natte mo (私がオバさんになっても; "Even If I Become an Old Lady")"			4:50
16.	"Oye Cómo Va"	Tito Puente	Puente	0:40
17.	"Overheat Night (オーバーヒート・ナイト, Ōbāhīto Naito)"	Ijichi		4:38
18.	"Yoru no Entotsu (夜の煙突; "Night Chimney")"	Masataro Naoe	Naoe	5:40
19.	"Sayonara Watashi no Koi (さよなら私の恋; "Goodbye, My Love")"			5:31
20.	"Ame (Rock Version) (雨 (ロック・ヴァージョン); "Rain" (Rock Version))"		Seiji Matsuura	5:04
21.	"Kono Machi (この街; "This Town")"			10:07
22.	"Teriyaki Burger (テリヤキ・バーガー, Teriyaki Bāgā)"			6:38

Blu-ray/DVD disc 2
No.	Title	Lyrics	Music	Length
1.	"Uchi ni Kagitte Sonna Koto wa Nai Hazu (うちにかぎってそんなことはないはず; "That Shouldn't Be the Case")"		Naoe	5:23
2.	"Dotchi mo Dotchi (どっちもどっち; "Whichever")" (Mrs. Moritaka Ver. 2004)		Takahashi	4:57
3.	"The Blue Blues"		Shin Kono	2:27
4.	"Atama ga Itai (頭が痛い; "My Head Hurts")"		Takahashi	3:15
5.	"Kowai Yume (こわい夢; "A Scary Dream")"			3:41
6.	"Taifu (台風; "Typhoon")"		Ijichi	4:48
7.	"Don't Stop the Music"	Tofubeats	Tofubeats	4:27
8.	"More More More" (Capsule cover)	Yasutaka Nakata	Nakata	4:25
9.	"U-Turn (Wagaya) (Uターン（我が家）, U-Tān (Wagaya); "U-Turn (My Home)")"		Takahashi	3:35
10.	"Kyushu Sodachi (九州育ち; "Raised in Kyushu")"			4:13
11.	"Ame (Rock Version)"		Matsuura	5:01
12.	"Tony Slavin"		Moritaka	5:03
13.	"Hae Otoko (ハエ男; "Fly Man")"		Moritaka	1:57
14.	"Banana Chips (バナナチップス, Banana Chippusu)" (Shonen Knife cover)	Naoko Yamano	Yamano	3:51
15.	"Watarasebashi"			3:46
16.	"Watashi no Yō ni (私のように; "Like Me")"		Kono	5:10
17.	"Ichido Asobi ni Kite yo (一度遊びに来てよ; "Come Out and Play")"			5:27
18.	"Yatchimai na (やっちまいな; "Crazy")"		Yasuaki Maejima	3:33
19.	"Yoru no Entotsu"	Naoe	Naoe	5:25
20.	"Watashi ga Obasan ni Natte mo"			6:16
21.	"Sonogo no Watashi (その後の私; "Me Afterwards")"			4:10
22.	"Every Day"		Takahashi	6:04
23.	"Concert no Yoru (コンサートの夜, Konsāto no Yoru; "Concert Night")"			7:48
24.	"Teriyaki Burger"			7:08

== Personnel ==
- Chisato Moritaka – vocals, drums, alto recorder
- The White Queen

- Yuichi Takahashi – guitar
- Maria Suzuki – guitar
- Yu Yamagami – keyboards
- Masafumi Yokoyama – bass
- Akira Sakamoto – drums

== Charts ==
Chart (2026)	Peak position
Blu-Ray Disc Chart (Oricon)	9
DVD Chart (Oricon)	6
