= Do the Best (Chisato Moritaka album) =

Greatest hits album by Chisato Moritaka
- Released: March 25, 1995
- Recorded: 1990–1995
- Genre: J-pop; pop rock; folk-pop
- Length: 62:04
- Language: Japanese
- Label: One Up Music
- Producer: Yukio Seto

Chisato Moritaka chronology
Step by Step (1994)	Do the Best (1995)	Taiyo (1996)

Singles from Do the Best
- 1. "Rock'n Omelette" Released: January 25, 1994; 2. "Suteki na Tanjōbi"/"Watashi no Daiji na Hito" Released: October 10, 1994; 3. "Futari wa Koibito" Released: February 10, 1995

Alternative cover
- Limited edition inner cover

Do the Best (ドゥ・ザ・ベスト, Du Za Besuto) is a greatest hits album by Japanese singer/songwriter Chisato Moritaka, released on March 25, 1995. The album marked Moritaka's return to active touring after being sidelined with a temporomandibular joint dysfunction for two years. It covers her singles from 1990 to 1995 and includes the new song "Kyō kara". A limited edition release included a 60-page photo book. The album was released on MiniDisc by zetima on December 23, 1998.

The album peaked at No. 2 on Oricon's albums chart and sold over 1.34 million copies. It also placed at No. 10 on Oricon's 1995 year-ending albums chart. In addition, it was Moritaka's first and only album to be certified Million and Triple Platinum by the RIAJ.

== Track listing ==
All lyrics are written by Chisato Moritaka; all music is composed and arranged by Hideo Saitō, except where indicated.

No.	Title	Music	Arrangement	Length
1.	"Rock 'n' Roll Kenchōshozaichi '95" (Rokkunrōru Kenchōshozaichi Kyūjū-go (ロックンロール県庁所在地’95; "Rock 'n' Roll Prefectural Government '95"))	Moritaka		3:08
2.	"Ame" ((雨) "Rain")	Seiji Matsuura		5:04
3.	"Watashi ga Obasan ni Natte mo (Album Version)" ((私がオバさんになっても (アルバム・ヴァージョン); "Even If I Become an Old Lady (Album Version)"))			4:59
4.	"Watarasebashi" ((渡良瀬橋; "Watarase Bridge"))			3:48
5.	"Watashi no Natsu" ((私の夏; "My Summer"))			4:20
6.	"Hae Otoko (Single Version)" ((ハエ男 (シングル・ヴァージョン); "Fly Man (Single Version)"))	Moritaka		3:54
7.	"Memories (Single Version)" ((Memories (シングル・ヴァージョン)))			5:22
8.	"Kaze ni Fukarete" ((風に吹かれて; "Blowing in the Wind))			4:47
9.	"Rock'n Omelette" (Rokkun Omuretsu (ロックン・オムレツ))	Hiromasa Ijichi		2:31
10.	"Kibun Sōkai" ((気分爽快; "Refreshing"))	Kenichi Kurosawa	Yuichi Takahashi	3:59
11.	"Natsu no Hi" ((夏の日; "Summer Day"))			3:44
12.	"Suteki na Tanjōbi" ((素敵な誕生日; "A Wonderful Birthday"))	Takahashi	Takahashi	4:08
13.	"Watashi no Daiji no Hito (Single Version)" ((私の大事な人 (シングル・ヴァージョン); "My Important Person (Single Version)"))	Moritaka	Yasuaki Maejima	3:27
14.	"Futari wa Koibito (Remix)" ((二人は恋人 (Remix); "We Are a Pair of Lovers (Remix)"))			4:25
15.	"Kyō kara" ((今日から; "Starting Today"))	Takahashi	Takahashi	4:22
Total length:				62:04

== Personnel ==
- Chisato Moritaka – vocals, drums, guitar, piano, Fender Rhodes (1, 15)
- Yuichi Takahashi – guitar, synthesizer, tambourine (1, 15)
- Yasuaki Maejima – Fender Rhodes, synthesizer (1)
- Taisei – organ (15)
- Masafumi Yokoyama – bass (1)
- Yukio Seto – bass (15)

== Charts ==
Chart (1995)	Peak position
Japanese Albums (Oricon)	2

== Certification ==
Region	Certification	Certified units/sales
Japan (RIAJ)	3× Platinum	1,200,000^{^}
^{^} Shipments figures based on certification alone.
