= Do the Best =

Do the Best may refer to:

- Do the Best (Do As Infinity album)
- Do the Best (Chisato Moritaka album)
