= Step by Step (Chisato Moritaka album) =

Studio album by Chisato Moritaka
- Released: July 25, 1994
- Recorded: 1994
- Genre: J-pop; pop rock; folk-pop
- Length: 53:31
- Language: Japanese; English
- Label: One Up Music
- Producer: Yukio Seto

Chisato Moritaka chronology
Lucky 7 (1993)	Step by Step (1994)	Do the Best (1996)

Singles from Step by Step
- 1. "Kaze ni Fukarete" Released: October 10, 1993; 2. "Kibun Sōkai" Released: January 31, 1994; 3. "Natsu no Hi" Released: May 10, 1994; 4. "Suteki na Tanjōbi"/"Watashi no Daiji na Hito" Released: October 10, 1994

Alternative cover
- Limited edition inner cover

Step by Step (ステップ バイ ステップ, Suteppu bai Suteppu) is the ninth studio album by the Japanese singer/songwriter Chisato Moritaka, released on July 25, 1994. This was Moritaka's first album under One Up Music. The album includes the song "Kaze ni Fukarete", which became her first No. 1 hit on the Oricon singles chart. Step by Step is Moritaka's first album in to include a cover version of a Beatles song. A limited edition release included a 32-page photo book.

Before the album's release, Moritaka was forced to stop touring after she suffered a temporomandibular joint dysfunction in spring 1994. She did not tour or release another studio album until 1996.

The album reached No. 3 on Oricon's albums chart and sold over 573,000 copies. It was certified Platinum by the RIAJ.

== Track listing ==
All lyrics are written by Chisato Moritaka, except where indicated.

No.	Title	Lyrics	Music	Arrangement	Length
1.	"Kibun Sōkai (Album Version)" ((気分爽快; "Refreshing"))		Kenichi Kurosawa	Yuichi Takahashi	3:56
2.	"Wakasa no Hiketsu" ((若さの秘訣; "The Secret of Youth"))		Moritaka	Moritaka	3:37
3.	"Zuru Yasumi" ((ずる休み; "Playing Hooky"))		Hiromasa Ijichi	Takahashi	3:40
4.	"Otoko nara" ((男なら; "If a Man"))		Hideo Saitō	Saitō	2:31
5.	"Natsu no Hi" ((夏の日; "Summer Day"))		Saitō	Saitō	3:42
6.	"Everybody's Got Something to Hide Except Me and My Monkey"	Lennon–McCartney	Lennon–McCartney	Moritaka	2:25
7.	"Torikago" ((鳥かご; "Birdcage"))		Yasuaki Maejima	Maejima; Takahashi	3:55
8.	"Hoshi no Ōjisama" ((星の王子様; "The Star Prince"))		Maejima	Maejima	3:09
9.	"Watashi no Daiji na Hito" ((私の大事な人; "My Important Person"))		Moritaka	Maejima	3:08
10.	"Ichido Asobi ni Kite yo" ((一度遊びに来てよ; "Come Out and Play"))		Saitō	Saitō	5:22
11.	"Office-gai no Koi" (Ofisu-gai no Koi (オフィス街の恋; "Love in the Office"))		Takahashi	Takahashi	3:38
12.	"Taifū" ((台風; "Typhoon"))		Ijichi	Takahashi	4:48
13.	"Kaze ni Fukarete" ((風に吹かれて; "Blowing in the Wind"))		Saitō	Saitō	4:47
14.	"Step by Step ~Kare no Jinsei~" (Suteppu bai Suteppu ~Kare no Jinsei~ (STEP BY STEP～彼の人生～; "Step by Step ~His Life~"))		Takahashi	Takahashi	4:46
Total length:					53:31

== Personnel ==
- Chisato Moritaka – vocals, drums (all tracks), rhythm guitar (2), piano (2–3, 12)
- Yuichi Takahashi – guitar, backing vocals (1–3, 5–7, 11–13, 15), synthesizer (2, 11, 15), bass synthesizer (3)
- Hiroyoshi Matsuo – guitar (1, 3, 7, 12–13)
- Yuko Nōji – guitar (2)
- Hideo Saitō – guitar, bass, keyboards, synthesizer, backing vocals (4–5, 10, 13), sitar (4), tambourine (5, 10, 13)
- Eiji Ogata – guitar (12)
- Jun Takahashi – guitar (13)
- Yasuaki Maejima – piano (2, 7–11), synthesizer (7–9), electric piano (8)
- Masafumi Yokoyama – bass (1)
- Yukio Seto – bass (2, 5, 7, 11–12, 15), guitar (8, 11), synthesizer (12)
- Seiji Ishikawa – cowbell (5)
- Hiyoshimaru – percussion (12)

== Charts ==
Chart (1994)	Peak position
Japanese Albums (Oricon)	3

== Certification ==
Region	Certification	Certified units/sales
Japan (RIAJ)	Platinum	400,000^{^}
^{^} Shipments figures based on certification alone.
