= Peachberry =

Studio album by Chisato Moritaka
- Released: July 16, 1997
- Recorded: 1996–1997
- Studio: Abbey Road Studios
- Genre: J-pop; pop rock
- Length: 54:05
- Language: Japanese
- Label: One Up Music
- Producer: Yukio Seto; Shin Hashimoto; Yuichi Takahashi

Chisato Moritaka chronology
| Taiyo (1996) | Peachberry (1997) | Kotoshi no Natsu wa More Better (1998) |

Singles from Peachberry
- 1. "Gin'iro no Yume" Released: November 11, 1996; 2. "Let's Go!" Released: February 25, 1997; 3. "Sweet Candy" Released: June 11, 1997

Peachberry (ピーチベリー, Pīchiberī) is the 11th studio album by Japanese singer/songwriter Chisato Moritaka, released on July 16, 1997, by One Up Music. The album marked the 10th anniversary of Moritaka's music career. A limited edition release was packaged in a cardboard box and included 13 photographs; each with lyrics to a corresponding song.

Peachberry draws inspiration from Moritaka's love of the Beatles' music, with some of the tracks recorded at Abbey Road Studios. The song "Tony Slavin" is named after the Liverpool barber shop that the Beatles referenced in their 1967 song "Penny Lane".

The album reached No. 4 on Oricon's albums chart and sold over 322,000 copies. It was also Moritaka's last studio album to be certified Gold by the RIAJ.

== Track listing ==
All lyrics are written by Chisato Moritaka; all music is arranged by Yuichi Takahashi, except where indicated.

| No. | Title | Music | Arrangement | Length |
|---|---|---|---|---|
| 1. | "Sweet Candy (Album Version)" | Yuichi Takahashi | | 4:52 |
| 2. | "My Anniversary" (Mai Anibāsarī (マイ・アニバーサリー)) | Takahashi | | 4:22 |
| 3. | "Oshare Fū" ((おしゃれ風(ふう); "Fashionable Wind")) | Moritaka | Moritaka | 4:14 |
| 4. | "Shintō Mekkyakusureba Himomata Suzushi" ((心頭滅却すれば火もまた涼し; "If You Destroy Your Heart, the Fire Will Cool Again")) | Takahashi | | 3:33 |
| 5. | "Let's Go!" | Hiromasa Ijichi | | 4:24 |
| 6. | "Anata wa Ninki Mono" ((あなたは人気者; "You Are a Popular Person")) | Shin Kono | Kono | 4:57 |
| 7. | "Futsū no Shiawase" ((普通の幸せ; "Ordinary Happiness")) | Chihiro Imai | | 4:47 |
| 8. | "Mitatōri yo Watashi" ((見たとおりよ私; "As You See Me")) | Moritaka | Moritaka | 3:34 |
| 9. | "Hoshi ni Negai wo" ((星に願いを; "Wish Upon a Star")) | Ijichi | | 4:53 |
| 10. | "Kataomoi" ((片思い; "Unrequited Love")) | Kōno | Kōno | 4:44 |
| 11. | "Tony Slavin" | Moritaka | Moritaka | 4:33 |
| 12. | "Clarinet Gensōkyoku (Instrumental)" (Kurarinetto Gensōkyoku (クラリネット幻想曲; "Clarinet Fantasy")) | Moritaka | Moritaka | 1:09 |
| 13. | "Gin'iro no Yume" ((銀色の夢; "The Silver Colored Dream")) | Ijichi | | 4:03 |
| Total length: | | | | 54:05 |

== Personnel ==
- Chisato Moritaka – vocals, drums (all tracks), tambourine (2, 10), shaker (2), timbales (6), recorder (7), accordion (7), piano (8), kalimba (8), pianica (11), clarinet (12), percussion (13)
- Yuichi Takahashi – guitar (1–2, 4–5, 7, 9–11, 13), keyboards (1–3, 5, 7–9, 11, 13)
- Shin Hashimoto – piano (1–2, 5, 7, 9, 11, 13), Fender Rhodes (1, 3, 5, 8), synthesizer (2, 5, 8–9), Wurlitzer (4), guitar (7, 11), kalimba (8), taishōgoto (13)
- Shin Kōno – piano (6, 10), Fender Rhodes (6, 10), percussion (6), keyboards (10)
- Yukio Seto – bass (1–2, 4–5, 7–8, 11, 13), guitar (1–7, 9–10, 13), conga (1), shaker (1, 6), bar chimes (5, 9–10), percussion (5, 13), djembe (8–9, 11), didgeridoo (8), timbales (9)
- Masafumi Yokoyama – bass (6, 10)
- Shuhei Miyachi – bell (4)
- Toshio Araki – trumpet (6)
- Kōji Nishimura – trumpet (6)
- Masakuni Takeno – alto saxophone (6)
- Takuo Yamamoto – tenor saxophone (6, 10), flute (6)
- Masanori Hirohara – trombone (6)
- Junko Yamashiro – bass trombone (6)
- Something Else – backing vocals (2)

- Nobutaka Okubo
- Daisuke Itō
- Chihiro Imai

== Charts ==
| Chart (1997) | Peak position |
|---|---|
| Japanese Albums (Oricon) | 4 |

== Certification ==
| Region | Certification | Certified units/sales |
|---|---|---|
| Japan (RIAJ) | Gold | 200,000^{^} |
^{^} Shipments figures based on certification alone.
