= Kotoshi no Natsu wa More Better =

Studio album by Chisato Moritaka
- Released: May 21, 1998
- Recorded: 1997–1998
- Studio: Quiet Lodge, Tokyo
- Genre: J-pop; pop rock
- Length: 34:36
- Language: Japanese
- Label: Zetima
- Producer: Harry Hosono; Yukio Seto

Chisato Moritaka chronology
Peachberry (1997)	Kotoshi no Natsu wa More Better (1998)	Sava Sava (1998)

Singles from Kotoshi no Natsu wa More Better
- 1. "Miracle Light" Released: October 15, 1997

Kotoshi no Natsu wa More Better (今年の夏はモア・ベター, Kotoshi no Natsu wa Moa Betā; This Summer Will Be More Better) is the 12th studio album by Japanese singer/songwriter Chisato Moritaka, released on May 21, 1998, by Zetima. The album was produced by veteran musician Harry Hosono and features cover versions of two of his songs. In addition, it includes "Summer Beach", a re-recording of "Natsu no Umi" from Moritaka's 1992 album Rock Alive. The album was also the first album since Mite to be released in LP format. During the time of the album's release, One Up Music merged with YJ Sounds to form zetima, and the label's distribution rights were changed from Warner Music Japan to Sony Music Entertainment Japan.

The album reached No. 10 on Oricon's albums chart and sold over 62,000 copies.

== Track listing ==
All lyrics are written by Chisato Moritaka, except where indicated; all music is composed and arranged by Harry Hosono, except where indicated.

No.	Title	Lyrics	Music	Arrangement	Length
1.	"Tokyo Rush" (Tōkyō Rasshu (東京ラッシュ))	Harry Hosono			3:44
2.	"Summer Beach" (Natsu no Umi (夏の海))		Yuichi Takahashi		3:56
3.	"Hey! Dog" (Hei! Inu (Hey! 犬))				3:24
4.	"A Bientôt" (A Bianto (ア・ビアント; "See You Soon"))		Miharu Koshi	Hosono; Koshi	5:00
5.	"Hooraibo" (Fūraibō (風来坊))	Hosono			3:53
6.	"Beach Party (Instrumental)" (Bīchi Pātī (ビーチ・パーティー))				3:19
7.	"Calypso no Musume" (Karipuso no Musume (カリプソの娘; "Calypso's Daughter"))				3:42
8.	"Miracle Light (Twist Version)" (Mirakuru Raito (Tsuisuto Vajon) (ミラクルライト (Twist Version)))				3:38
9.	"Miracle Woman (Vinyl Version)" (Mirakuru Ūman (Biniru Vajon) (ミラクルウーマン (Vinyl Version)))				4:00

== Personnel ==
- Chisato Moritaka – vocals, additional drums (1, 5, 9), steel drum (7)
- Harry Hosono – all instruments, vocals (1, 5–6)
- Miharu Koshi – backing vocals (2), additional instruments (4)

== Charts ==
Chart (1998)	Peak position
Japanese Albums (Oricon)	10
