= Pepperland (album) =

Studio album by Chisato Moritaka
- Released: November 18, 1992
- Genre: J-pop; pop rock
- Length: 43:25
- Language: Japanese
- Label: Warner Music Japan
- Producer: Yukio Seto

Chisato Moritaka chronology
Rock Alive (1992)	Pepperland (1992)	Lucky 7 (1993)

Pepperland (ペパーランド, Pepārando) is the seventh studio album by Japanese singer/songwriter Chisato Moritaka, released on November 18, 1992, by Warner Music Japan. Named after a small music hall (itself named after the orchestral piece from Yellow Submarine) in Kumamoto where Moritaka started playing music, the album marked a shift in musical direction in her career, as she became more engaged in playing musical instruments such as drums, rhythm guitar, bass, and piano. It also has a more stripped-down sound in comparison to Moritaka's previous albums. Pepperland is the only studio album in Moritaka's catalog to not have any singles.

The album reached No. 5 on Oricon's albums chart and sold over 197,000 copies. It was also certified Gold by the RIAJ.

== Track listing ==
All lyrics are written by Chisato Moritaka.

No.	Title	Music	Arrangement	Length
1.	"Pepperland" (Pepārando (ペパーランド))	Shin Kono	Kono	4:00
2.	"Dotchi mo Dotchi" ((どっちもどっち; "Whichever"))	Yuichi Takahashi	Takahashi	3:59
3.	"Atama ga Itai" ((頭が痛い; "My Head Hurts"))	Takahashi	Takahashi; Moritaka	3:50
4.	"Sunrise" (Sanraizu (サンライズ))	Takahashi	Takahashi; Moritaka	4:22
5.	"Rock 'n' Roll Kenchōshozaichi" (Rokkunrōru Kenchōshozaichi (ロックンロール県庁所在地; Rock 'n' Roll Prefectural Government))	Moritaka	Moritaka	2:29
6.	"Ame no Asa" ((雨の朝; "Rainy Morning"))	Yasuaki Maejima	Maejima	4:17
7.	"Tokonatsu no Paradise" (Tokonatsu no Paradaisu (常夏のパラダイス; "Everlasting Paradise"))	Toshiaki Matsumoto	Matsumoto	3:43
8.	"U-Turn (Wagaya)" (Yū Tān (Wagaya) (Uターン (我が家); "U-Turn (My Home)"))	Takahashi	Takahashi	3:39
9.	"Gokigen na Asa" ((ごきげんな朝; "Happy Morning"))	Hideo Saitō	Saitō	4:37
10.	"Rock Alarm Clock"	Masataro Naoe	Takahashi; Naoe	4:03
11.	"Aoi Umi" ((青い海; "The Blue Sea"))	Hiroyoshi Matsuo	Matsuo	4:24
Total length:				43:25

== Personnel ==
- Chisato Moritaka – vocals, drums, piano, rhythm guitar, acoustic guitar, bass (all tracks except where indicated)
- Yuichi Takahashi – guitar (1–4, 7–9), bass (2–3, 8), backing vocals (2–4, 8)
- Shin Kōno – guitar (1), Fender Rhodes (7)
- Yukio Seto – guitar (3)
- Izutsuya – guitar (4, 7, 9–10)
- Masataro Naoe – guitar, synthesizer (10)
- Hiroyoshi Matsuo – guitar (11)
- Yasuaki Maejima – Fender Rhodes, synthesizer (6)
- Hideo Saitō – synthesizer (9)
- Yukie Matsuo – Fender Rhodes (11)
- Masafumi Yokoyama – bass (7, 10)

== Charts ==
Chart (1992)	Peak position
Japanese Albums (Oricon)	5

== Certification ==
Region	Certification	Certified units/sales
Japan (RIAJ)	Gold	200,000^{^}
^{^} Shipments figures based on certification alone.
