= Kumamonmon =

2013 song

Single by Various artists
- Language: Japanese
- B-side: "Kumamoto Surprise!"
- Released: September 25, 2013
- Recorded: 2013
- Genre: J-pop; children's
- Label: zetima
- Songwriters: Kundō Koyama; Kan

Music videos
- "Kumamonmon" on YouTube
- "Kumamoto Surprise!" on YouTube

"Kumamonmon" (くまモンもん) is a single released by zetima on September 25, 2013, to promote the Kumamoto Prefecture mascot Kumamon and celebrate his third birthday. The single was released in two formats: CD only and CD + DVD.

== Background ==
Written by Kundō Koyama and Kan, "Kumamonmon" features vocals by Chisato Moritaka. Both Koyama and Moritaka are from Kumamoto Prefecture while Kan was from neighboring Fukuoka Prefecture.

The music video was filmed at Kumamoto Castle, featuring dance choreography by Sasuga Minami.

== Chart performance ==
"Kumamonmon" peaked at No. 13 on Oricon's singles chart.

== Track listing ==
CD single
No.	Title	Lyrics	Music	Arrangement	Length
1.	"Kumamonmon" ((くまモンもん))	Kundō Koyama	Kan	Kan
2.	"Kumamoto Surprise!" (Kumamoto Sapuraizu! (くまもとサプライズ!))	Bombo Fujii	Fujii	Fujii
3.	"Kumamonmon" (Original Karaoke)
4.	"Kumamoto Surprise!" (Original Karaoke)

DVD
No.	Title	Length
1.	"Kumamonmon (Music Video)" (Kumamonmon (Myūjikku Bideo) (くまモンもん（ミュージックビデオ）))
2.	"Kumamonmon (Let's Dance Together! Version)" (Kumamonmon (Minna de Odorou! Bājon) (くまモンもん（みんなで踊ろう!バージョン）))
3.	"Kumamoto Surprise (Let's Dance Together! Version)" (Kumamoto Sapuraizu! (Minna de Odorou! Bājon) (くまもとサプライズ!（みんなで踊ろう!バージョン）))

== Personnel ==
- Chisato Moritaka – vocals (1)
- Motohiro Hata – acoustic guitar (1)
- Kumamon-tai (2)

- Umi Motoiwa – lead vocals
- Megumi Murakami – backing vocals
- Pico – backing vocals

== Charts ==
Chart (2013)	Peak position
Japanese Oricon Singles Chart	13
