= Lucky 7 (Chisato Moritaka album) =

Studio album by Chisato Moritaka
- Released: May 10, 1993
- Recorded: 1992–1993
- Length: 60:02
- Language: Japanese
- Label: Warner Music Japan
- Producer: Yukio Seto

Chisato Moritaka chronology
Pepperland (1992)	Lucky 7 (1993)	Step by Step (1994)

Singles from Lucky 7
- 1. "Watarasebashi"/"Writer Shibō" Released: June 25, 1992; 2. "Watashi no Natsu" Released: April 10, 1993; 3. "Hae Otoko/Memories" Released: June 25, 1993

Alternative cover
- Limited edition inner cover

Lucky 7 (ラッキーセブン, Rakkī Sebun) is the eighth studio album by Japanese singer/songwriter Chisato Moritaka, released on May 10, 1993. It was Moritaka's final studio release under Warner Music Japan. The album's title signifies the seventh anniversary of Moritaka's debut. A limited edition release included a 32-page photo book.

The album reached No. 3 on Oricon's albums chart and sold over 421,000 copies. It was also certified Platinum by the RIAJ.

== Track listing ==
All lyrics are written by Chisato Moritaka.

No.	Title	Music	Arrangement	Length
1.	"Te wo Tatakō" ((手をたたこう; "Clap Your Hands"))	Moritaka	Moritaka	3:26
2.	"Tanki wa Sonki" ((短気は損気; "Irritability"))	Yuichi Takahashi	Takahashi	2:50
3.	"Hareta Nichiyōbi" ((晴れた日曜日; "Sunny Sunday"))	Takahashi	Takahashi	4:37
4.	"Jimi na Onna" ((地味な女; "A Sober Woman"))	Hideo Saitō	Saitō	4:27
5.	"Tōi Mukashi" ((遠い昔; "A Long Time Ago"))	Takahashi	Takahashi	3:54
6.	"Bassari Yatte yo" ((ばっさりやってよ; "Just Do It"))	Takahashi	Takahashi	3:44
7.	"Watashi no Natsu (Album Version)" ((私の夏; "My Summer"))	Saitō	Saitō	5:33
8.	"I Love You"	Hiromasa Ijichi	Takahashi	3:52
9.	"Hae Otoko" ((ハエ男; "Fly Man"))	Moritaka	Moritaka	4:02
10.	"Watarasebashi" ((渡良瀬橋; "Watarase Bridge"))	Saitō	Saitō	3:47
11.	"Sayonara Watashi no Koi" ((さよなら私の恋; "Goodbye, My Love"))	Saitō	Saitō	4:33
12.	"Tomodachi no Kare" ((友達の彼; "His Friend"))	Ijichi	Takahashi	4:52
13.	"Otoko no Roman" ((男のロマン; "A Man's Romance"))	Saitō	Saitō	4:49
14.	"Memories"	Saitō	Saitō	5:33
Total length:				60:02

== Personnel ==
- Chisato Moritaka – vocals, drums, piano, rhythm guitar, alto recorder
- Yuichi Takahashi – guitar, bass, synthesizer, backing vocals (all tracks except where indicated)
- Hideo Saitō – guitar, bass, organ, synthesizer, tambourine (4, 7, 10, 11, 13, 14)
- Eiji Ogata – guitar (9)
- Jun Takahashi – acoustic guitar (11)
- Shin Hashimoto – piano (9)
- Yukio Seto – bass (all tracks except where indicated), guitar, (3, 12)

== Charts ==
Chart (1993)	Peak position
Japanese Albums (Oricon)	3

== Certification ==
Region	Certification	Certified units/sales
Japan (RIAJ)	Platinum	400,000^{^}
^{^} Shipments figures based on certification alone.
