= Mahiru no Hoshi =

1999 song by Chisato Moritaka

Single by Chisato Moritaka
- Language: Japanese
- English title: Midday Star
- B-side: "Ame (1999)"
- Released: May 19, 1999
- Recorded: 1999
- Genre: J-pop
- Length: 4:36
- Label: Media Factory
- Composer: Shikao Suga
- Lyricist: Chisato Moritaka
- Producer: Yukio Seto

Chisato Moritaka singles chronology
"Watashi no Yō ni" (1998)	"Mahiru no Hoshi" (1999)	"Ichido Asobi ni Kite yo '99" (1999)

"Mahiru no Hoshi" (まひるの星; lit. "Midday Star") is the 39th single by Japanese singer/songwriter Chisato Moritaka. Written by Moritaka and Shikao Suga, the single was released by Media Factory on May 19, 1999. The song was used as the ending theme of the Hong Kong/Japanese romance film Moonlight Express.

== Chart performance ==
"Mahiru no Hoshi" peaked at No. 41 on Oricon's singles chart and sold 23,000 copies.

== Other versions ==
Moritaka re-recorded the song and uploaded the video on her YouTube channel on November 23, 2013. This version is also included in Moritaka's 2014 self-covers DVD album Love Vol. 6.

== Track listing ==
All lyrics are written by Chisato Moritaka; all music is arranged by Yuichi Takahashi.

No.	Title	Music	Length
1.	"Mahiru no Hoshi" ((まひるの星; "Midday Star"))	Shikao Suga	4:36
2.	"Ame (1999)" ((雨 (1999); "Rain (1999)"))	Seiji Matsuura	5:04
3.	"Mahiru no Hoshi" (Original Karaoke)		4:31

== Charts ==
Chart (1999)	Peak position
Japanese Oricon Singles Chart	41
