= Tsumetai Tsuki =

1998 song by Chisato Moritaka

Single by Chisato Moritaka
- Language: Japanese
- English title: Cold Moon
- B-side: "Kiken na Hodō (5 Version)"
- Released: October 1, 1998
- Recorded: 1998
- Genre: J-pop
- Length: 4:29
- Label: zetima
- Composer: Yuichi Takahashi
- Lyricist: Chisato Moritaka
- Producer: Yukio Seto

Chisato Moritaka singles chronology
"Umi made 5-fun" (1998)	"Tsumetai Tsuki" (1998)	"Watashi no Yō ni" (1999)

Music video
- Tsumetai Tsuki on YouTube

"Tsumetai Tsuki" (冷たい月; lit. "Cold Moon") is the 37th single by Japanese singer/songwriter Chisato Moritaka. Written by Moritaka and Yuichi Takahashi, the single was released by zetima on October 1, 1998. The song was used as an image song for NTV's booth at the 1998 Museum of Fine Arts Exhibition at the Musée de l'Orangerie in Paris to commemorate the network's 45th anniversary.

== Chart performance ==
"Tsumetai Tsuki" peaked at No. 33 on Oricon's singles chart and sold 14,000 copies.

== Other versions ==
Moritaka re-recorded the song and uploaded the video on her YouTube channel on May 31, 2013. This version is also included in Moritaka's 2013 self-covers DVD album Love Vol. 4.

== Track listing ==
All lyrics are written by Chisato Moritaka.

8 cm CD
No.	Title	Music	Length
1.	"Tsumetai Tsuki" ((冷たい月; "Cold Moon"))	Yuichi Takahashi	4:29
2.	"Kiken na Hodō (5 Version)" ((危険な舗道 (5version); "Dangerous Pavement (5 Version)"))	Moritaka	4:09
3.	"Tsumetai Tsuki" (Original Karaoke)		4:25

== Personnel ==
- Chisato Moritaka – vocals, drums
- Yuichi Takahashi – acoustic guitar, synthesizer programming, piano
- Yasuaki Maejima – piano, Fender Rhodes
- Yukio Seto – acoustic guitar, bass, percussion

== Charts ==
Chart (1998)	Peak position
Japanese Oricon Singles Chart	33
