= Miracle Light =

1997 song by Chisato Moritaka

Single by Chisato Moritaka

from the album Kotoshi no Natsu wa More Better
- Language: Japanese
- B-side: "Miracle Woman"
- Released: October 15, 1997
- Recorded: 1997
- Genre: J-pop; pop rock
- Length: 3:38
- Label: One Up Music
- Composer: Harry Hosono
- Lyricist: Chisato Moritaka
- Producer: Harry Hosono

Chisato Moritaka singles chronology
"Sweet Candy" (1997)	"Miracle Light" (1997)	"Snow Again" (1997)

Music video
- Miracle Light on YouTube

"Miracle Light" (ミラクルライト, Mirakuru Raito) is the 33rd single by Japanese singer/songwriter Chisato Moritaka. Written by Moritaka and Harry Hosono, the single was released by One Up Music on October 15, 1997.

== Background ==
"Miracle Light" fulfilled a life-long dream of Moritaka to collaborate with veteran musician Hosono. In addition to recording the single, they both starred in a series of Lawson commercials.

== Music video ==
The music video features footage from Moritaka's 1997 Sega Saturn game Watarasebashi/La La Sunshine, with a collage of photos, animation, and a stage performance by Moritaka dressed in a witch costume.

== Chart performance ==
"Miracle Light" peaked at No. 20 on Oricon's singles chart and sold 30,000 copies.

== Other versions ==
Moritaka re-recorded the song and uploaded the video on her YouTube channel on July 20, 2013. This version is also included in Moritaka's 2014 self-covers DVD album Love Vol. 5.

== Track listing ==
All lyrics are written by Chisato Moritaka; all music is composed and arranged by Harry Hosono.

8 cm CD
No.	Title	Length
1.	"Miracle Light" (Mirakuru Raito (ミラクルライト))	3:38
2.	"Miracle Woman" (Mirakuru Ūman (ミラクルウーマン))	4:07
3.	"Miracle Light" (Original Karaoke)	3:37

== Personnel ==
- Chisato Moritaka – vocals, drums
- Harry Hosono – keyboards, guitar, bass

== Charts ==
Chart (1997)	Peak position
Japanese Oricon Singles Chart	20
