= Rock'n Omelette =

1994 song by Chisato Moritaka

Single by Chisato Moritaka

from the album Do the Best
- Language: Japanese
- B-side: "Rock'n Omelette (Original Karaoke)"
- Released: January 25, 1994
- Recorded: 1993
- Genre: J-pop; pop rock; children's
- Length: 2:32
- Label: One Up Music
- Composer: Hiromasa Ijichi
- Lyricist: Chisato Moritaka
- Producer: Yukio Seto

Chisato Moritaka singles chronology
"Kaze ni Fukarete" (1993)	"Rock'n Omelette" (1994)	"Kibun Sōkai" (1994)

"Rock'n Omelette" (ロックン・オムレツ, Rokkun Omuretsu) is a children's song and the 21st single by Japanese singer/songwriter Chisato Moritaka. Written by Moritaka and Hiromasa Ijichi, the single was released by One Up Music on January 25, 1994. The song was used as the first opening theme of the Fuji TV children's show Ponkickies (ポンキッキーズ, Ponkikkīzu) and was featured in the 1995 various artists album Ponkickies Melody. The cover art was illustrated by Lily Franky.

== Chart performance ==
"Rock'n Omelette" peaked at No. 13 on Oricon's singles chart and sold 100,000 copies.

== Other versions ==
Moritaka re-recorded the song and uploaded the video on her YouTube channel on December 14, 2012. This version is also included in Moritaka's 2013 self-covers DVD album Love Vol. 3.

== Track listing ==
All lyrics are written by Chisato Moritaka; all music is composed by Hiromasa Ijichi.

8 cm CD
No.	Title	Length
1.	"Rock'n Omelette" (Rokkun Omuretsu (ロックン・オムレツ))	2:32
2.	"Rock'n Omelette" (Original Karaoke)	2:27

== Personnel ==
- Chisato Moritaka – vocals, drums
- Yuichi Takahashi – guitar, bass, backing vocals
- Shin Kōno – piano

== Chart positions ==
Chart (1994)	Peak position
Japanese Oricon Singles Chart	13

== Cover versions ==
- Satoko Yamano covered the song on her 1994 single "Kodomo no Uta ~ Rock'n Omelette".
- Kuko covered the song on her 1994 album Min'na de Utaou! Kodomo no Uta Rock'n Omelette.
- Sayuri Hara, Ruriko Aoki, and Atsumi Tanezaki covered the song on the 2018 album Cinderella Party Dere pa Ondo Dondonka.
