= Umi made 5-fun =

1998 song by Chisato Moritaka

Single by Chisato Moritaka

from the album Sava Sava
- Language: Japanese
- English title: 5 Minutes to the Sea
- B-side: "Sleepless Night Blues"
- Released: July 15, 1998
- Recorded: 1998
- Genre: J-pop; pop rock
- Length: 4:15
- Label: zetima
- Composer: Toshinobu Kubota
- Lyricist: Chisato Moritaka
- Producer: Yukio Seto

Chisato Moritaka singles chronology
"Denwa" (1998)	"Umi made 5-fun" (1998)	"Tsumetai Tsuki" (1998)

Music video
- Umi made 5-fun on YouTube

"Umi made 5-fun" (海まで５分, Umi made Go-fun; lit. "5 Minutes to the Sea") is the 36th single by Japanese singer/songwriter Chisato Moritaka. Written by Moritaka and Toshinobu Kubota, the single was released by zetima on July 15, 1998. It is the theme song of the TBS drama of the same name. The song was also used in a 2010 Panasonic camcorder commercial featuring Moritaka.

== Music video ==
The music video features Moritaka rolling a toy Mini convertible around a house while another version of herself performs the song with her band by the pool.

== Chart performance ==
"Umi Made 5-fun" peaked at No. 20 on Oricon's singles chart and sold 32,000 copies, becoming Moritaka's last top 20 single.

== Other versions ==
Moritaka re-recorded the song and uploaded the video on her YouTube channel on August 5, 2012. This version is also included in Moritaka's 2013 self-covers DVD album Love Vol. 1.

== Track listing ==
All lyrics are written by Chisato Moritaka.

8 cm CD
No.	Title	Music	Arrangement	Length
1.	"Umi made 5-fun" (Umi made Go-fun (海まで５分; "5 Minutes to the Sea"))	Toshinobu Kubota	Yasuaki Maejima	4:15
2.	"Sleepless Night Blues"	Moritaka	Moritaka	3:25
3.	"Umi Made 5-fun" (Original Karaoke)			4:11

== Personnel ==
- Chisato Moritaka – vocals, drums, steel drums
- Yasuaki Maejima – keyboards, piano
- Masahiro Inaba – guitar
- Yukio Seto – guitar
- Yuichi Takahashi – acoustic guitar
- Takuo Yamamoto – tenor saxophone
- Yohichi Murata – brass, trombone
- Akira Okumura – trumpet
- Gen Ogimi – congas, timbales, shaker

== Charts ==
Chart (1998)	Peak position
Japanese Oricon Singles Chart	20
