= Yasumi no Gogo =

1995 song by Chisato Moritaka

Single by Chisato Moritaka

from the album Taiyo
- Language: Japanese
- English title: Holiday Afternoon
- B-side: "Wasuremono"
- Released: October 10, 1995
- Recorded: 1995
- Genre: J-pop; folk-pop
- Length: 4:41
- Label: One Up Music
- Composer: Hideo Saitō
- Lyricist: Chisato Moritaka
- Producer: Yukio Seto

Chisato Moritaka singles chronology
"Futari wa Koibito" (1995)	"Yasumi no Gogo" (1995)	"Jin Jin Jingle Bell" (1995)

"Yasumi no Gogo" (休みの午後; lit. "Holiday Afternoon") is the 26th single by Japanese singer/songwriter Chisato Moritaka. Written by Moritaka and Hideo Saitō, the single was released by One Up Music on October 10, 1995. The song was used as the ending theme of the TV Tokyo drama series Iitabi Yume Kibun (いい旅・夢気分; Good Trip, Dreamy Feeling). The single marked Moritaka's final collaboration with Saitō, whom she had worked with since her debut single "New Season" in 1987.

== Chart performance ==
"Yasumi no Gogo" peaked at No. 5 on Oricon's singles chart and sold 219,000 copies. It was also certified Gold by the RIAJ.

== Other versions ==
Moritaka re-recorded the song and uploaded the video on her YouTube channel on September 19, 2012. This version is also included in Moritaka's 2013 self-covers DVD album Love Vol. 2.

== Track listing ==
All lyrics are written by Chisato Moritaka; all music is composed and arranged by Hideo Saitō.

8 cm CD
No.	Title	Length
1.	"Yasumi no Gogo" ((休みの午後; lit. "Holiday Afternoon"))	4:41
2.	"Wasuremono" ((忘れ物; "Lost Item"))	3:17
3.	"Yasumi no Gogo" (Original Karaoke)	4:37

== Personnel ==
- Chisato Moritaka – vocals, drums
- Hideo Saitō – guitar, bass, horns, synthesizer, tambourine, backing vocals
- Yasuaki Maejima – piano, organ

== Chart positions ==
Chart (1995)	Peak position
Japanese Oricon Singles Chart	5

== Certification ==
Region	Certification	Certified units/sales
Japan (RIAJ)	Gold	200,000^{^}
^{^} Shipments figures based on certification alone.

== Cover versions ==
- Runa Miyoshida covered the song in her 2008 album Pure Flavor#2 ~Key of Love~.
