= Sweet Candy (song) =

1997 song by Chisato Moritaka

Single by Chisato Moritaka

from the album Peachberry
- Language: Japanese
- B-side: "Mirai"
- Released: June 11, 1997
- Recorded: 1997
- Studio: Abbey Road Studios (drum tracks)
- Genre: J-pop; pop rock
- Length: 4:57
- Label: One Up Music
- Composer: Yuichi Takahashi
- Lyricist: Chisato Moritaka
- Producer: Yukio Seto

Chisato Moritaka singles chronology
"Let's Go!" (1997)	"Sweet Candy" (1997)	"Miracle Light" (1997)

Music video
- Sweet Candy on YouTube

"Sweet Candy" (スウィートキャンディ, Suuīto Kyandi) is the 32nd single by Japanese singer/songwriter Chisato Moritaka. Written by Moritaka and Yuichi Takahashi, the single was released by One Up Music on June 11, 1997. The song was used by Lawson for their store commercials. The B-side is "Mirai", which was used at the 54th National Sports Festival in Moritaka's hometown of Kumamoto.

== Background ==
Being a fan of the Beatles, Moritaka fulfilled a life-long dream with "Sweet Candy" by recording her drum tracks at Abbey Road Studios. The music video was also filmed in parts of London during the recording sessions.

Moritaka performed the song on the 48th Kōhaku Uta Gassen, which was her sixth and final appearance on the annual New Year's Eve special.

== Chart performance ==
"Sweet Candy" peaked at No. 10 on Oricon's singles chart and sold 93,000 copies.

== Other versions ==
Moritaka re-recorded the song and uploaded the video on her YouTube channel on July 23, 2012. This version is also included in Moritaka's 2013 self-covers DVD album Love Vol. 1.

== Track listing ==
All lyrics are written by Chisato Moritaka; all music is arranged by Yuichi Takahashi.

8 cm CD
No.	Title	Music	Length
1.	"Sweet Candy"	Yuichi Takahashi	4:57
2.	"Mirai" ((未来; "Future"))	Moritaka	4:04
3.	"Sweet Candy" (Original Karaoke)		4:53

== Personnel ==
- Chisato Moritaka – vocals, drums
- Yuichi Takahashi – guitar, keyboards
- Shin Hashimoto – piano, keyboard
- Yukio Seto – guitar, bass
- Nobuyuki Mori – tenor saxophone, baritone saxophone
- Wakaba Kawai – trombone
- Futoshi Kobayashi – trumpet
- Shiro Sasaki – trumpet

== Charts ==
Chart (1997)	Peak position
Japanese Oricon Singles Chart	10
