= Natsu no Hi =

1994 song by Chisato Moritaka

Single by Chisato Moritaka

from the album Step by Step
- Language: Japanese
- English title: Summer Day
- B-side: "Kowai Yume"
- Released: May 10, 1994
- Recorded: 1994
- Genre: J-pop; folk-pop
- Length: 3:45
- Label: One Up Music
- Composer: Hideo Saitō
- Lyricist: Chisato Moritaka
- Producer: Yukio Seto

Chisato Moritaka singles chronology
"Kibun Sōkai" (1994)	"Natsu no Hi" (1994)	"Suteki na Tanjōbi/ Watashi no Daiji na Hito" (1994)

Music video
- Natsu no Hi on YouTube

"Natsu no Hi" (夏の日; lit. "Summer Day") is the 23rd single by Japanese singer/songwriter Chisato Moritaka. The lyrics were written by Moritaka and the music was composed by Hideo Saitō. The single was released by One Up Music on May 10, 1994. The song was used as the ending theme of TV Tokyo's variety show Asakusabashi Young Yōhinten.

== Chart performance ==
"Natsu no Hi" peaked at No. 5 on Oricon's singles chart and sold 409,000 copies. It was also certified Platinum by the RIAJ.

== Other versions ==
Moritaka re-recorded the song and uploaded the video on her YouTube channel on August 10, 2012. This version is also included in Moritaka's 2012 self-covers DVD album Love Vol. 1.

== Track listing ==
All lyrics are written by Chisato Moritaka; all music is composed and arranged by Hideo Saitō.

8 cm CD
No.	Title	Length
1.	"Natsu no Hi" ((夏の日; "Summer Day"))	3:45
2.	"Kowai Yume" ((こわい夢; "A Scary Dream"))	3:44
3.	"Natsu no Hi" (Original Karaoke)	3:40

== Personnel ==
- Chisato Moritaka – vocals, drums
- Hideo Saitō – guitar, bass, keyboard, tambourine, backing vocals

== Chart positions ==
Chart (1994)	Peak position
Japanese Oricon Singles Chart	5

== Certification ==
Region	Certification	Certified units/sales
Japan (RIAJ)	Platinum	409,000

== Cover versions ==
- Something Else covered the song on their 2004 album Natsu Uta.
