= Kibun Sōkai =

1994 song by Chisato Moritaka

Single by Chisato Moritaka

from the album Step by Step
- Language: Japanese
- English title: Refreshing
- B-side: "Te wo Tatakō 2"
- Released: January 31, 1994
- Recorded: 1993
- Genre: J-pop; pop rock
- Length: 3:59
- Label: One Up Music
- Composer: Kenichi Kurosawa
- Lyricist: Chisato Moritaka
- Producer: Yukio Seto

Chisato Moritaka singles chronology
| "Rock'n Omelette" (1994) | "Kibun Sōkai" (1994) | "Natsu no Hi" (1994) |

Music video
- Kibun Sōkai on YouTube

Kibun Sōkai

Video by Chisato Moritaka
- Released: November 30, 1994
- Genre: J-pop; pop rock
- Language: Japanese
- Label: One Up Music
- Producer: Yukio Seto

Chisato Moritaka chronology
| Lucky 7 Live (1994) | Kibun Sōkai (1994) | 1996 Do the Best Live at Yokohama Arena (1996) |

"Kibun Sōkai" (気分爽快; lit. "Refreshing") is the 22nd single by Japanese singer/songwriter Chisato Moritaka. Written by Moritaka and Kenichi Kurosawa, the single was released by One Up Music on January 31, 1994. The song was used by Asahi Breweries for commercials promoting Asahi Z beer.

The song was included in the 2020 various artists album Egao no Uta ~ Minna no Kokoro ni Nokoru Suteki na Kyoku, Kokoro ni Sotto Yorisou Uta ~ (エガオのウタ～みんなのココロに残るステキな曲、ココロにそっと寄り添う歌～; Songs of Smiles ~ Wonderful Songs That Remain in Everyone's Heart, Songs That Gently Snuggle Up to Your Heart~).

== Music video ==
The music video takes place at a restaurant, with Moritaka singing by her table before all of the customers and staff dance with her. The video introduced the "Kibun Sōkai dance", with Moritaka directing the audience to wave their arms right to left to the chorus.

The music video LaserDisc was released on November 30, 1994, with its contents compiled in the 2000 DVD Chisato Moritaka DVD Collection No. 9: Kibun Sōkai.

== Chart performance ==
"Kibun Sōkai" peaked at No. 3 on Oricon's singles chart and sold 438,000 copies. It was also certified Platinum by the RIAJ.

== Other versions ==
Moritaka re-recorded the song and uploaded the video on her YouTube channel on August 3, 2013. This version is also included in Moritaka's 2014 self-covers DVD album Love Vol. 5. It was also used in a 2015 Asahi Style Free beer commercial starring Moritaka.

The song was remixed by tofubeats in the 2014 collaboration album Chisato Moritaka with tofubeats: Moritaka Tofu.

== Track listing ==
All lyrics are written by Chisato Moritaka.

8 cm CD
| No. | Title | Music | Arrangement | Length |
|---|---|---|---|---|
| 1. | "Kibun Sōkai" ((気分爽快; "Refreshing")) | Kenichi Kurosawa | Yuichi Takahashi | 3:59 |
| 2. | "Te wo Tatakō 2" (Te wo Tatakō Tsū (手をたたこう2; "Clap Your Hands 2")) | Moritaka | Moritaka | 3:39 |
| 3. | "Kibun Sōkai" (Original Karaoke) | | | 3:54 |

LaserDisc
| No. | Title | Music | Arrangement | Length |
|---|---|---|---|---|
| 1. | "Watarasebashi" ((渡良瀬橋; "Watarase Bridge")) | Hideo Saitō | Saitō |
| 2. | "Watashi no Natsu" ((私の夏; "My Summer")) | Saitō | Saitō |
| 3. | "Hae Otoko (Long Version)" (Hae Otoko (Rongu Vājon) (ハエ男 (ロング・ヴァージョン); "Fly Man" (Long Version))) | Moritaka | Moritaka |
| 4. | "Kaze ni Fukarete" ((風に吹かれて; "Blowing in the Wind")) | Saitō | Saitō |
| 5. | "Rock'n Omelette" (Rokkun Omuretsu (ロックン・オムレツ)) | Moritaka | Moritaka |
| 6. | "Kibun Sōkai" ((気分爽快; "Refreshing")) | Kurosawa | Takahashi |
| 7. | "Natsu no Hi" ((夏の日; "Summer Day")) | Saitō | Saitō |
| 8. | "Suteki na Tanjōbi" ((素敵な誕生日; "A Wonderful Birthday")) | Takahashi | Takahashi |
| 9. | "Making of (Watashi no Daiji no Hito)" ((私の大事な人; "My Important Person")) | Moritaka | Yasuaki Maejima |

== Personnel ==
- Chisato Moritaka – vocals, drums
- Yuichi Takahashi – guitar, piano, backing vocals
- Hiroyoshi Matsuo – acoustic guitar
- Shin Hashimoto – piano
- Masafumi Yokoyama – bass
- Yukio Seto – bass

== Charts ==
| Chart (1994) | Peak position |
|---|---|
| Japanese Oricon Singles Chart | 3 |

== Certification ==
| Region | Certification | Certified units/sales |
|---|---|---|
| Japan (RIAJ) | Platinum | 400,000^{^} |
^{^} Shipments figures based on certification alone.

== Cover versions ==
- Yumi Adachi covered the song on her 1995 album Big. Because Adachi was 14 years old at the time, the word "beer" (ビール, bīru) was replaced with "cola" (コーラ, kōra) in the lyrics.
- Shōko Hamada covered the song on her 2007 cover album Hamashō Album ~O teate Shimashōko~.
- Runa Miyashida covered the song on her 2009 album Ska Flavor No. 2.
- Azumi Waki covered the song on the 2016 soundtrack album The Idolm@ster Cinderella Master Jewelries! 003.
