= Kenichi Kurosawa =

Kenichi Kurosawa 黒沢 健一

Background information
- Born: 11 August 1968; Hitachi, Ibaraki, Japan
- Died: 5 December 2016 (aged 48) Tokyo, Japan
- Occupations: Singer-songwriter; composer; lyricist; producer
- Instruments: Vocals; electric guitar; acoustic guitar
- Years active: 1990–2016
- Website: www.k-kurosawa.com

Kenichi Kurosawa (黒沢 健一, Kurosawa Ken'ichi; 11 August 1968 – 5 December 2016) was a Japanese musician and record producer from Hitachi, Ibaraki. His younger brother is Hideki Kurosawa, who is also a musician.

== Biography ==
In a contest participating in an amateur band during his school days, a special prize was given from Tetsuya Komuro (later became LR's "(I Wanna) Be With You"). That song began as an opportunity, and later debuted as a composer at the age of nineteen. He provided songs to Yoko Minamino and Nami Shimada.

About 1990, his demonstration tapes (which later became LR's "(I Wanna) Be With You") which he personally made were stopped by ears of record producer Daiji Okai (part of Yonin Bayashi, whom were disbanded at the time) and was acquainted, later introduced to Kenichi Makimura who was a producer of Polystar Records at that time, and had an opportunity debuted to debut as LR.

In 1990, with his brother Hideki and friend Hiruharu Kinoshita, he formed LR and started group activities. In 1991, they debuted with the mini album L, and later released thirteen singles and seven albums.

In 1998, after the end of "Concert Tour '97 'Doubt'," he announced suspension of his activities of LR, and entered solo activities.

In addition to releasing works under his solo name, he also energetically conduct group activities such as curve509, Science Ministry, Ken'z (Ken'z with Friends), Motorworks, and Hanky Panky. While his other activities as music producer and composer were also continuing.

He announced a one-man live holding on his official website on 8 November 2007. In December, he would release a new song for the first time in five years only with iTunes, and would hold a single live at the end of the year, which resumed singer activities.

His tour "Tour without electricity 2008" held at six locations nationwide in May 2008.

On 4 March 2009, he released the album Focus for as a solo for seven years. After that, his band tours were held in six cities nationwide.

On 3 October 2016, on his official website, he publicised that he was under treatment for brain tumour. It was discovered as a result of an inspection after a dizziness occurred during his rehearsal of the live in October 2015, and after that he was repeatedly in and out of hospital.

He later died by brain tumour on 5 December of the same year. He was 48 years old.

On 23 January 2017, at Tokyo Culture Culture the "Flowering Association to remember Kenichi Kurosawa" was held.

Three of his albums first, B and New Voices were reissued on a bonus track on 15 March of the same year. In the bonus track of first, a studio version of "What is this song?" which was unpublished was recorded.

== Television appearances ==
- Sunny Rock! (23 Dec 2007, TVK)
- Ongaku to Hige (20 May 2008, Niigata TV 21)
- Sharam Q Kessei 20 Shūnenkinen Live Kansha! Hatachi no Sharam Q Minna de Oiwaida! Nippon Budokan Festival –Nagai yo– (12 Dec 2008, Wowow)
- Tokudane! (5 Mar 2009, CX)
- Onegai! Ranking (25 Mar 2010, CX)
- 1-Ban Song Show (29 May 2013, 22 Jan 2014, NTV)
- Kanjani no Shiwake Eight (22 Jun, 6 Jul 2013, EX)
- V3 (28 Jun 2013, 27 Feb 2015, KBC)
- Arigato'! (1 Jul 2013, 25 Mar 2015, TVK)
- 1-I o totta Meikyoku Ongaku-sai (4 Oct 2013, NTV)

== Discography ==
=== Singles ===
	Title	Release date	Recorded music	Highest rank	Remarks
1	Wondering	3 Jun 1998	1. Wondering; 2. Stage Fright	41st place	NHK Pop Jam ending theme
2	Rock'n Roll	19 Aug 1998	1. Rock'n Roll; 2. The Ugly Things; 3. Whenever You're Ready; 4. Didn't Want To Have To Do It	44th place	Latter three are covers of Brinsley Schwarz, The Zombies, and The Lovin' Spoonful respectively
3	This Song	2 Jun 1999	1. This Song (Original Sound Track); 2. Free Bird; 3. This Song (Loud cut)	77th place	YTV drama Romance insert song
4	Pale Ale	21 Nov 2001	1. Pale Ale; 2. Carry On; 3. Rock'n Roll (Live); 4. Round Wound (Live)	89th place	Hunter×Hunter (OVA) opening theme; TVK Mutoma Japan theme song; 2nd is the ending theme of Hunter×Hunter (OVA)

=== Web singles ===
	Title	Release date	Recorded music
1	Feel it	5 Dec 2007	1. Feel it 2. Pop Song
2	Scene39	19 Dec 2007	1. Scene39; 2. Love Hurts
3	Looking For The Place	28 Mar 2015	1. Looking For The Place; 2. Boots

=== Albums ===
	Title	Release date	Recorded music	Highest rank	
1	first	18 Sep 1998	1. Oh Why; 2. Rock'n Roll; 3. Round Wound; 4. Love Love; 5. Mad Man Across The Water; 6. Easy Romances; 7. Morning Sun; 8. Wondering; 9. Far East Network; 10. Really I Wanna Know; 11. Rock'n Roll (reprise)	34th place	
2	B	14 Mar 2011	1. Little Song; 2. Speed o Agete ku 3. Talking Blues; 4. Ballad; 5. Tōkumade; 6. Three Code; 7. What You Want; 8. Good To Me; 9. Do-Bee-Doo; 10. Shiten; 11. Doko ka ni aru Basho	68th place	
3	New Voices	17 Apr 2002	1. Chewing Gum; 2. All I Want Is You; 3. New Ways To See The World; 4. (You Don't Need) Nothin' To Be Free; 5. Short Cut; 6. Trash; 7. Hang Glider; 8. Pale Ale; 9. Speak Eazy; 10. New Ways To See The World (part 2); 11. Shadow Stabbing	65th place	
	Live without electricity	4 Jun 2008	1. Day By Day; 2. Scene39; 3. Feel it 4. Society's Love; 5. Rock'n Roll; 6. Tōkumade; 7. This Song; 8. Love Hurts; 9. Hello It's Me; 10. Bye Bye Popsicle; 11. Lazy Girl; 12. Pale Ale; 13. Younger Than Yesterday; 14. Little Song; 15. God Only Knows; 16. Blue o Uchinuite	221st place	
4	Focus	4 Mar 2009	1. Grow; 2. Feel it (ver.); 3. Love Hurts (al); 4. Scene39 (ver.); 5. Maybe; 6. Silencio; 7. Pop Song (al ver.); 8. Mute; 9. Do we do 10. Somewhere I can go 11. September Rain	111st place	
	V.S.G.P	15 Dec 2010	Disc1 -Studio-: 1. What is this song?; 2. Package; 3. Hakobune; 4. Keep the circle turning 5. Walking on a rainbow 6. Love is real?; 7. Northern town; Disc2 -Live-: 1. Equinox; 2. 7voice 3. Remember; 4. What is this song?; 5. September rain 6. Package; 7. Keep the circle turning 8. Wondering; 9. Love is real?; 10. Hello it's me 11. Grow; 12. Northtown christmas		
	V.S.G.P Naked	18 Dec 2010	1. Package; 2. Keep the circle turning 3. Love is real?; 4. Northern town		
	Alone Together Volume One	29 Dec 2012	1. Show Must Go On; 2. Shangri-La; 3. Love Goes Withered; 4. Ding-Dong-Bus; 5. Holdin' Out -You & Me Together-; 6. Show Must Go On (inst); 7. Shangri-La (inst); 8. Love Goes Withered (inst); 9. Ding-Dong-Bus (inst); 10. Holdin' Out -You & Me Together- (inst)		
5	Banding Together in Dreams	25 Jun 2013	1. Return To Love; 2. A Summer Song; 3. So What?; 4. Rock'n Roll Band; 5. Many Things; 6. The Moon & You; 7. I'm In Love; 8. Lay Your Hands; 9. Dreams; 10. Goodbye	79th place	Album also released as a limited edition
	Lifetime Best "Best Value"	8 Jun 2015	1. Hello,It's Me; 2. All I Want Is You; 3. Pale Ale; 4. Soul Kitchen; 5. (I Wanna) Be With You; 6. Maybe; 7. Knockin' On Your Door; 8. Days; 9. Don't Bring Me Down –Tōkumade–; 10. Too Lonely To See; 11. Wondering; 12. Shooting Through The Rule –Blue o Uchinuite–	148th place	Self cover album by producer Eric Ross
	Hear Me Now	5 Dec 2017	1. I Need You Loving; 2. Baby You Are Mine; 3. Hear Me Now; 4. A Song For Christmas; 5. Dream Of Life; 6. Looking Like My Player; 7. Fontana; 8. Reason For Your Smile; 9. Winds Blow; 10. Please My Baby Tonight; 11. Don't Let It Bring You Down; 12. Shake It Back!; 13. Rainin' In My Heart; 14. Good Night; 15. 45's Love Song; 16. 19 Aug. 1987		

=== Limited web albums ===
	Title	Release date	Recorded music
1	Live2011 New Direction	29 Aug 2012	1. Maybe_inst; 2. Round Wound; 3. American Dream; 4. Package; 5. Rockn' Roll; 6. Speak Eazy; 7. (A Place Where) Loves Goes Withered; 8. Red & Blue; 9. Sweet Wondering; 10. Silencio; 11. Wondering; 12. Hakobune; 13. Lay Your Hands; 14. Love Love; 15. Do we do 16. All I want is you

== Main production works ==
- Chiaki Nakajima "Lovely Love Me" (single)
- Chiaki Nakajima "Don't Take My Time" (single)
- Hidenori Tokuyama "Afureru Omoi" – Also in charge of chorus
- Hidenori Tokuyama "One 17th"
- Hidenori Tokuyama "Real Time"
- hi*limits "Yoizuki"

== Main song provisions ==
=== Lyrics ===
- Takui Nakajima "Abstract/Kanzen na Sōkan-sei"
- Chiaki Nakajima "Don't Take My Time"

=== Compositions ===
- Chisato Moritaka "Kibun Sōkai"
- Junichi Inagaki "Double Meaning"
- Mutsumi Inoue "Rendezvous"
- Indies "Indies no Theme"
- Izumi Kato "7th Heaven"
- Nami Shimada "He Loves Her"
- chiaki "Canaria"
- Masakazu Togo "Hito sukui no"
- Hidenori Tokuyama "Drive," "Pure," "Kizuke yo," "Ha-Ha," "Itsumo soba ni," "Love Letter," "Nichijō"
- Hiromi Nagasaku "My Home Town," "Without You"
- Takayuki Nakamura "Sutekina Paradise," "Asa kara Yoku Hareta Tsuitachi"
- Nanatsuboshi "Christmas Calling"
- Noriko Hidaka "Nobara Sakukoro," "Doko ka ni Shiawase ga," "Tengoku ni Chikai tokoro de Nakitai"
- Yoko Minamino "Side Sheet ni Kotaete," "Sore wa Natsu no Gogo"
- Melody "Unmei'95"
- Megu "Demo...?"
- Chisato Moritaka "Kibun Sōkai"
- Shione Yukawa "Kiri no Yoru," "Futari no Tegami," "Cherbourg no Ame"

=== Songwriting ===
- Kyoko "Baby Queen"
- Chiaki Nakajima "Lovery,Love Me," "It Must Be Love," "Peace Of Mind"
- Hidenori Tokuyama "Afureru Omoi," "Huckleberry," "Close To Me," "Blue," "Touch Me," "Still Time," "Sotsugyō," "Happy Birthday," "Tsutaeru Kimochi," "Lover’s Kitchen," "For Real," "No,Say Good-Bye," "Throw Away," "Sleepless Night," "With You!," "Life"
- Naohito Fujiki "Good Old Summer Days" (*Co-written with Satori Shiraishi)
