= Suteki na Tanjōbi =

1994 song by Chisato Moritaka

Single by Chisato Moritaka

from the album Do the Best
- Language: Japanese
- English title: A Lovely Birthday
- A-side: "Watashi no Daiji na Hito (Single Version)"
- Released: October 10, 1994
- Recorded: 1994
- Genre: J-pop; folk-pop
- Length: 4:09
- Label: One Up Music
- Composer: Yuichi Takahashi
- Lyricist: Chisato Moritaka
- Producer: Yukio Seto

Chisato Moritaka singles chronology
"Natsu no Hi" (1994)	"Suteki na Tanjōbi" / "Watashi no Daiji na Hito" (1994)	"Futari wa Koibito" (1995)

"Suteki na Tanjōbi" (素敵な誕生日; lit. "A Wonderful Birthday") is the 24th single by Japanese singer/songwriter Chisato Moritaka. Written by Moritaka and Yuichi Takahashi, the single was released with "Watashi no Daiji na Hito" by One Up Music on October 10, 1994. It became her second of two singles to hit No. 1 on Oricon's singles chart (the first being "Kaze ni Fukarete" in 1993).

== Background ==
"Suteki na Tanjōbi" was used by Asahi Breweries for commercials promoting Asahi Z beer. "Watashi no Daiji na Hito (Single Version)" is taken from Moritaka's 1994 studio album Step by Step.

Moritaka performed "Suteki na Tanjōbi" on the 45th Kōhaku Uta Gassen.

== Music video ==
The music video for "Suteki na Tanjōbi" is set on a farm, with Moritaka playing drums while a masked man plays guitar.

== Chart performance ==
"Suteki na Tanjōbi"/"Watashi no Daiji na Hito" hit No. 1 on Oricon's singles chart and sold 380,000 copies. It was also certified Gold by the RIAJ.

== Other versions ==
Moritaka re-recorded the song and uploaded the video on her YouTube channel on January 30, 2013. This version is also included in Moritaka's 2013 self-covers DVD album Love Vol. 3.

== Track listing ==
All lyrics are written by Chisato Moritaka; all music is arranged by Yuichi Takahashi.

No.	Title	Music	Length
1.	"Suteki na Tanjōbi" ((素敵な誕生日; "A Wonderful Birthday"))	Takahashi	4:09
2.	"Watashi no Daiji na Hito (Single Version)" (Watashi no Daiji na Hito (Shinguru Bājon) (私の大事な人 (シングル・バージョン); "My Important Person (Single Version)"))	Moritaka	3:28
3.	"Suteki na Tanjōbi" (Original Karaoke)		4:09
4.	"Watashi no Daiji na Hito (Single Version)" (Original Karaoke)		3:23

== Personnel ==
- Chisato Moritaka – vocals, drums
- Yuichi Takahashi – guitar, synthesizer, backing vocals
- Yukio Seto – bass
- Yasuaki Maejima – Fender Rhodes, synthesizer

== Chart positions ==
Chart (1994)	Peak position
Japanese Oricon Singles Chart	1

== Certification ==
Region	Certification	Certified units/sales
Japan (RIAJ)	Gold	200,000^{^}
^{^} Shipments figures based on certification alone.

== Cover versions ==
- Runa Miyoshida covered the song on her 2010 album Ska Flavor #3.
