= Futari wa Koibito =

1995 song by Chisato Moritaka

Single by Chisato Moritaka

from the album Do the Best
- Language: Japanese
- English title: We Are a Pair of Lovers
- B-side: "Wakasa no Hiketsu"
- Released: February 10, 1995
- Recorded: 1994
- Genre: J-pop; pop rock
- Length: 4:18
- Label: One Up Music
- Composer: Hideo Saitō
- Lyricist: Chisato Moritaka
- Producer: Yukio Seto

Chisato Moritaka singles chronology
"Suteki na Tanjōbi/ Watashi no Daiji na Hito" (1994)	"Futari wa Koibito" (1995)	"Yasumi no Gogo" (1995)

Music video
- Futari wa Koibito on YouTube

"Futari wa Koibito" (二人は恋人; lit. "We Are a Pair of Lovers") is the 25th single by Japanese singer/songwriter Chisato Moritaka. The lyrics were written by Chisato Moritaka, the music was composed and arranged by Hideo Saitō. The single was released by One Up Music on February 10, 1995. The song was used as the theme of the NTV drama series Koi no 2-dome Nara (恋も2度目なら, Koi no Ni-dome Nara; Love for a Second Time).

== Background ==
The single cover was photographed in Italy. At the time of the single's release, One Up Music became a fully independent label after Up-Front Group purchased Warner Music Japan's half of the joint venture.

Moritaka performed the song on the 46th Kōhaku Uta Gassen.

== Music video ==
The black-and-white music video features Moritaka performing both vocals and drums simultaneously as two people. A color version of the video was also released.

== Chart performance ==
"Futari wa Koibito" peaked at No. 5 on Oricon's singles chart and sold 444,000 copies, becoming Moritaka's biggest selling single. It was also certified Platinum by the RIAJ.

== Other versions ==
Moritaka re-recorded the song and uploaded the video on her YouTube channel on November 5, 2012. This version is also included in Moritaka's 2013 self-covers DVD album Love Vol. 3.

== Track listing ==
All lyrics are written by Chisato Moritaka.

8 cm CD
No.	Title	Music	Arrangement	Length
1.	"Futari wa Koibito" ((二人は恋人; "We Are a Pair of Lovers"))	Hideo Saitō	Saitō	4:18
2.	"Wakasa no Hiketsu" (Wakasa no Hiketsu (Shinguru Vājon) (若さの秘訣 (シングル・バージョン); "The Secret of Youth (Single Version)"))	Moritaka	Moritaka	3:34
3.	"Futari wa Koibito (Drama Opening Size)" ((二人は恋人 (ドラマ・オープニング・サイズ)))	Saitō	Saitō	2:04
4.	"Futari wa Koibito" (Original Karaoke)			4:13

== Personnel ==
- Chisato Moritaka – vocals, drums, cowbell
- Hideo Saitō – guitar, synthesizer, tambourine, backing vocals
- Yuichi Takahashi – guitar
- Yasuhiko Fukuda – piano
- Yasuaki Maejima – piano
- Yukio Seto – bass

== Chart positions ==
Chart (1995)	Peak position
Japanese Oricon Singles Chart	5

== Certification ==
Region	Certification	Certified units/sales
Japan (RIAJ)	Platinum	400,000^{^}
^{^} Shipments figures based on certification alone.
