= Kaze ni Fukarete =

1993 song by Chisato Moritaka

Single by Chisato Moritaka

from the album Step by Step
- Language: Japanese
- English title: Blowing in the Wind
- B-side: "Kyushu Sodachi"
- Released: October 11, 1993
- Recorded: 1993
- Genre: J-pop; folk-pop
- Length: 4:47
- Label: One Up Music; Warner Music Japan (distribution)
- Composer: Hideo Saitō
- Lyricist: Chisato Moritaka
- Producer: Yukio Seto

Chisato Moritaka singles chronology
"Hae Otoko/ Memories" (1993)	"Kaze ni Fukarete" (1993)	"Rock'n Omelette" (1994)

Music video
- Kaze ni Fukarete on YouTube

"Kaze ni Fukarete" (風に吹かれて; "Blowing in the Wind") is the 20th single by Japanese singer/songwriter Chisato Moritaka.The lyrics were written by Moritaka and the music was composed by Hideo Saitō. The single was released by One Up Music and Warner Music Japan on October 11, 1993. It became her first of two singles to hit No. 1 on Oricon's singles chart (the second being "Suteki na Tanjōbi"/"Watashi no Daiji na Hito" in 1994).

== Background ==
"Kaze ni Fukarete" marked Moritaka's label transfer to One Up Music, which started as a joint venture between Up-Front Group and Warner Music Japan. One Up Music has since been rebranded as Up-Front Works. The song was inspired by the streets of Yufuin, Ōita Prefecture. It was used by All Nippon Airways for its "La Kyushu" (ラ・九州, Ra Kyūshū) marketing campaign.

== Chart performance ==
"Kaze ni Fukarete" hit No. 1 on Oricon's singles chart. It was also certified Gold by the RIAJ.

== Other versions ==
Moritaka re-recorded the song and uploaded the video on her YouTube channel on August 31, 2012. This version is also included in Moritaka's 2013 self-covers DVD album Love Vol. 2.

== Track listing ==
All lyrics are written by Chisato Moritaka; all music is composed and arranged by Hideo Saitō.

8 cm CD
No.	Title	Length
1.	"Kaze ni Fukarete" ((風に吹かれて; "Blowing in the Wind"))	4:47
2.	"Kyushu Sodachi" ((九州育ち; "Raised in Kyushu"))	4:18
3.	"Kaze ni Fukarete" (Karaoke)	4:43

== Personnel ==
- Chisato Moritaka – vocals, drums
- Hideo Saitō – bass, acoustic guitar, synthesizer, tambourine, backing vocals
- Yuichi Takahashi – acoustic guitar
- Hiroyoshi Matsuo – acoustic guitar
- Jun Takahashi – acoustic guitar

== Charts ==
Chart (1993)	Peak position
Japanese Oricon Singles Chart	1

== Certification ==
Region	Certification	Certified units/sales
Japan (RIAJ)	Gold	200,000^{^}
^{^} Shipments figures based on certification alone.
