= Chisato Moritaka =

Japanese pop singer (born 1969)

- 森高千里
- Born: 11 April 1969 (age 57); Ibaraki, Osaka, Japan
- Occupation: Singer-songwriter
- Agent: Up-Front Create
- Height: 161 cm (5 ft 3 in)
- Spouse: Yōsuke Eguchi (m. 1999)
- Children: 2
- Musical career
- Genres: J-pop; dance-pop; pop rock; folk-pop; city pop
- Instruments: Vocals; drums; guitar; piano; recorder; accordion; clarinet
- Years active: 1987–1999; 2012–present
- Label: Up-Front Works; Warner Music Japan; zetima; Warner Pioneer; One Up Music

Japanese name
- Kanji: 森高 千里
- Hiragana: もりたか ちさと
- Katakana: モリタカ チサト
Transcriptions
- Romanization: Moritaka Chisato
- Website: moritaka-chisato.com

Signature
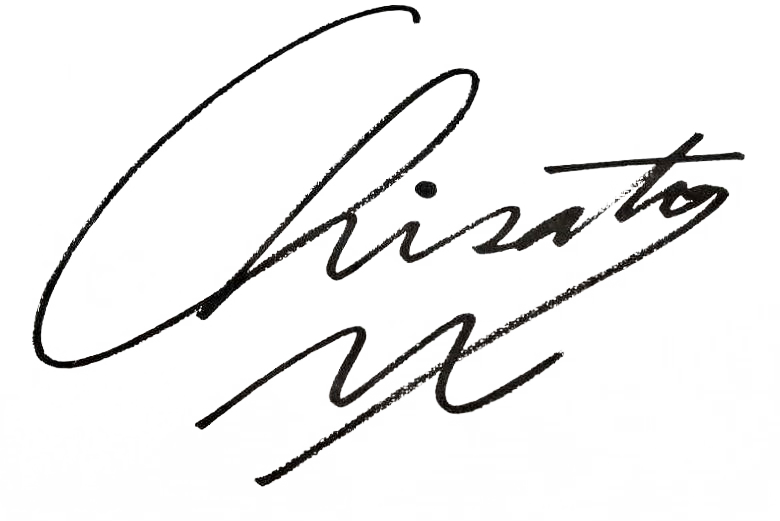

Chisato Moritaka (森高千里, Moritaka Chisato) (born 11 April 1969) is a Japanese pop singer who also is notable as a songwriter. She is affiliated with Up-Front Create, a subsidiary of the Up-Front Group.

Moritaka's singing career as the unrivaled "Dance Queen" began in May 1987 with the release of her debut album New Season. She differed from many other female idol singers in Japan in that she wrote her own lyrics for majority of her albums. More than 60 of her songs were composed by Hideo Saitō. Moritaka also played drums on many of the tracks, as well as piano, guitar, recorder, clarinet, and other instruments. Her musical style was influenced by Pink Lady, Janet Jackson, Roger Taylor, and The Beatles. From 1987 to 1999, Moritaka sold over 6.4 million singles and 5.2 million albums. Moritaka's advertising jingles were hits into the mid-1990s in television commercials for goods and services such as consumer electronics, chocolate, beer, gin, and travel packages. She has also made numerous appearances on Japanese game and talent shows and is still a household name. In twelve years after her debut, she released 13 studio albums and created a strong following of devoted fans.

== Biography ==
=== Early years ===
Born in Ibaraki, Osaka, Japan, Chisato Moritaka was raised in Kumamoto, Kyushu. Her father, Shigekazu Moritaka (森高 茂一, Moritaka Shigekazu), was a member of a rockabilly band called Orange Hill (オレンジ・ヒル, Orenji Hiru). Her mother, Chizuko Moritaka (森高 千鶴子, Moritaka Chizuko), is a former actress. While studying at Kyushu Girls' School (九州女学院, Kyūshū Jogakuin) (now Kyūshū Lutheran College), Moritaka played drums in a band that mainly covered Rebecca songs.

=== Entertainment career ===
Moritaka's big break into show business came when she won the Grand Prix of the first Pocari Sweat Image Girl Contest in 1986. She appeared in a series of Pocari Sweat commercials with Shigesato Itoi, who was one of the judges of the contest. While pursuing her new career, Moritaka transferred to Horikoshi High School in Tokyo.

In 1987, Moritaka starred in the Toho film Aitsu ni Koishite, which premiered on 30 May. She also made her music debut with her first single "New Season" on 25 May. Following her first concert at Shibuya Live Inn on 7 September, Moritaka focused on her music career. In 1988, she wrote the lyrics for her first song, "The Mi-ha" which was composed by Hideo Saitō. During a rehearsal in the middle of her first tour, Moritaka suffered abdominal pain and was hospitalized for a week. Her experience at the hospital inspired her to write the lyrics for "The Stress".

On 25 May 1989, Moritaka released "17-sai", a cover of Saori Minami's 1971 song. The single peaked at No. 8 on Oricon's singles chart, making it her first top-10 hit. The song's catchy Eurobeat arrangement, combined with Moritaka's dance choreography and colorful costumes with flashy miniskirts that display her slender legs, defined her musical style and image throughout the first half of her career and made her a hit with male fans. Her fifth album Kokon Tozai in 1990 became her first and only album to hit No. 1 on Oricon's albums chart. Moritaka's 11th single "Ame" peaked at No. 2 on Oricon's singles chart and became her first single to be certified Gold by the RIAJ.

On 25 June 1992, Moritaka released the single "Watashi ga Obasan ni Natte mo". Composed by Saitō, Moritaka wrote the lyrics when she was 20 after being told by male staff of her management that women reach their prime at age 19. The song peaked at No. 15, but has since become a popular hit among women, especially after actress Hikari Ishida announced it as "A song that gave all women the courage!" (すべての女性に勇気を与えた歌です！, Subete no josei ni yūki wo ataeta uta desu!) during the 43rd Kōhaku Uta Gassen on NHK. Her Rock Alive tour featured female musicians as members of her band. Starting with her album Pepperland, Moritaka started recording drums, guitar, bass, piano, and other instruments on most of her songs. In addition, she began playing instruments on her concerts more frequently. This also marked a change in her image from her vibrant outfits to a more contemporary look.

In 1993, Moritaka scored her first No. 1 hit with the single "Kaze ni Fukarete". However, she was forced to cancel her national tour in 1994 after suffering a temporomandibular joint dysfunction, and she was unable to tour for two years. While recovering, Moritaka played drums in Shigeru Izumiya's band at a fundraising concert at the Nippon Budokan to aid victims of the Great Hanshin earthquake. Also in the band was actor and bassist Yōsuke Eguchi, whom Moritaka would eventually marry four years later. Moritaka resumed touring in April 1996 with the Do the Best tour, starting at the Yokohama Arena. During the later half of the 1990s, she fulfilled some lifetime goals through two albums. Her 10th anniversary album Peachberry saw her recording her tracks at the famous Abbey Road Studios and take a pilgrimage to Liverpool as a Beatles fan. Moritaka worked with veteran producer Haruomi Hosono on her 1998 album Kotoshi no Natsu wa More Better. However, at the time of the release of her 13th and final studio album Sava Sava, 1998 saw a decline in sales, with her singles no longer making the top-10.

=== Retirement and return ===
Moritaka retired at the end of 1999 after her marriage to focus on raising her children. During her retirement, she made a few commercial appearances with Eguchi for House Foods Java Curry. After an eight-year hiatus from public life, Moritaka recorded a song for a Nissan Lafesta commercial in early 2007. In 2008, she made a guest appearance at Sharam Q's 20th anniversary concert at the Nippon Budokan, performing "Watarasebashi" and "Kibun Sōkai". A year later, Moritaka made her first TV appearance in over 10 years on Bokura no Ongaku. From 2010 to 2018, she served as a host of Tokyo Broadcasting System Television's travel show Chikyū Zekkei Kikō (地球絶景紀行; Voyage to Earth's Superb Views). On 9 April 2011, Moritaka joined other members of the Up-Front Group roster in the charity event "Ganbarō Nippon Ai wa Katsu ~From Yokohama with love~" (がんばろうニッポン 愛は勝つ 〜From Yokohama with love〜, "You Can Do It Japan – Love Will Win ~From Yokohama with love~") at Yamashita Park to support the victims of the Tōhoku earthquake and tsunami.

On 25 May 2012, Moritaka celebrated her 25th anniversary by renewing her official website and opening new accounts on YouTube, Facebook, and Google+. As part of her anniversary celebration, she challenged herself to cover 200 of her songs on her YouTube channel, which she accomplished in 2017 with "Oshare Fū". Moritaka and Warner Music Japan also released the three-disc compilation album The Singles on 8 August; it reached No. 5 on Oricon's Albums Chart, making it her first top-five album since Peachberry. In 2013, Moritaka and DJ tofubeats collaborated on a single titled "Don't Stop the Music." She also recorded the song "Kumamonmon" to celebrate Kumamon's third birthday.

In 2018, Moritaka and dance choreographer Mikiko were inducted into the Fourth Women of Excellence Awards. On 27 and 28 May, Moritaka hosted a two-day concert at the Hitomi Memorial Hall, performing The Singles in its entirety. The concert was released on Blu-ray on 22 May 2019 as 30th Anniversary Final Project "The Singles" Day 1・Day 2 Live 2018 Complete Version. In 2019, Moritaka hosted the Kono Machi Tour 2019 (この街ツアー2019), her first national concert tour in 21 years. The tour was well received, prompting her to announce a second national tour for the next year.

In 2020, Moritaka became the brand ambassador for DHC's Queen of Serum anti-aging skin cream. On 21 March, she performed "La La Sunshine" on Fuji TV's music special Kinkyu Namahoso! FNS Ongaku Tokubetsu Bangumi Haru wa Kanarazu Kuru (緊急生放送！！FNS音楽特別番組 春は必ず来る, Emergency Live Broadcast! ! FNS Music Special Program Spring Always Comes), which was broadcast to cheer up the public during the COVID-19 pandemic. On 4 May, Moritaka was among the 121 members of Up-Front Group to participate in a YouTube telework to support the frontline workers during the pandemic. On 25 July, Moritaka hosted an online concert, performing her 10 most popular songs as voted by her fans. In addition, Warner Music Japan announced the release of Moritaka's Kono Machi Tour 2019 Blu-ray and DVD on 26 August. The video covers her concert at Kumamoto Castle Hall on 20 December 2019, which was her first show in her hometown in over 26 years. On 15 October, she performed a special concert at Zepp Diver City in Tokyo, titled "Chisato Moritaka Live 2020 ～Selected by Nobuaki Onuki～ The Profound Top 20 Best Songs (森高千里ライブ ２０２０〜音楽評論家・小貫信昭が選ぶ“深淵なる名曲”ベスト２０, Moritaka Chisato Raibu 2020 〜 Ongaku Hyōron-ka Onuki Nobuaki ga Erabu "Shin'en'naru Meikyoku" Besuto 20). The concert featured live performances of 20 of Moritaka's songs selected by music critic Nobuaki Onuki, plus her covers of Shonen Knife's "Banana Chips" and Negoto's "Sharp". On 8 December, Moritaka performed her third and final online concert of 2020 at Zepp Haneda in Tokyo, titled "Chisato Moritaka Live 2020 Final: My Favorites, My Songs which Chisato Moritaka Didn't Pick on the First Two Live Streaming Shows" (今度は森高千里が選ぶ1回目2回目のライブ配信では歌わなかったマイフェイバリット・マイソングス～森高千里ライブ2020 FINAL, Kondo wa Moritaka Chisato ga Erabu 1-kai-me 2-kai-me no Raibu Haishinde wa Utawanakatta Mai Feibaritto Mai Songusu ~ Moritaka Chisato Raibu 2020 Fainaru). The concert featured a personal selection of Moritaka's 16 songs, plus her cover of Capsule's "More More More".

In May 2021, Moritaka announced the release of the three-disc live video Chisato Moritaka Live 2020, which compiles her three online concerts from the past year.

On 11 March 2022, Moritaka participated in the Shuichi "Ponta" Murakami tribute concert "One Last Live", performing "Zaru de Mizu kumu Koigokoro" and "La La Sunshine". She also joined Mie in performing the Pink Lady hit single "UFO". In November, Moritaka became the brand ambassador for Yakult Honsha's Lactdew beauty product line.

In July 2023, Moritaka and Warner Music Japan announced the release of the live video Kono Machi Tour 2020–22 on 18 October.

Moritaka is scheduled to perform with Maki Watase of Lindberg at the Pink Lady 50th anniversary tribute concert on 25 August 2026.

Moritaka currently hosts Nippon Broadcasting System's All Night Nippon Music 10 every second Wednesday of the month. She also hosted the Fuji TV program Love Music until its final episode on 17 September 2023.

== Personal life ==
Moritaka married actor Yōsuke Eguchi on 3 June 1999 after discovering she was pregnant with their first child. She gave birth to a daughter in February 2000 and a son in May 2002.

Moritaka's father runs a coffee shop in Aso, Kumamoto called "Orange Hill", named after his old band.

In an interview with AndGirl magazine, Moritaka revealed that her secret to retaining her youthful looks and toned legs was regular skin moisturizing and exercise, including an hour of swimming. In an interview with Vogue Japan, she said she has also been doing hot yoga.

== Legacy ==
- In 1993, guitar designer Bill Lawrence released the MB-68 Chisato Moritaka Signature Model electric guitar, which Moritaka used during her Lucky 7 tour that year.
- In 2007, a stele was erected in Ashikaga, Tochigi in honor of Moritaka's song "Watarasebashi". The stele features a speaker that plays a portion of the song.
- Singer-songwriter Takuro Yoshida praised Moritaka's songwriting style, commenting that she "destroyed the world view of lyrics that we musicians have built over decades until now." Moritaka's drumming skills also impressed veteran jazz drummer Shuichi Murakami.
- On 29 March 2019, Music Station hosted its "Heisei 30 Nenkan Music Station No.1 Award" ceremony to mark the end of the Heisei era. Moritaka was recognized in two categories: Best Costume (2nd Place: "Nozokanaide") and Most Performances (10th Place: 102).

== Discography ==
- New Season (1987)
- Mi-ha (1988)
- Mite (1988)
- Hijitsuryokuha Sengen (1989)
- Kokon Tozai (1990)
- Rock Alive (1992)
- Pepperland (1992)
- Lucky 7 (1993)
- Step by Step (1994)
- Taiyo (1996)
- Peachberry (1997)
- Kotoshi no Natsu wa More Better (1998)
- Sava Sava (1998)

== Filmography ==
=== Film ===
- Aitsu ni Koishite (あいつに恋して; In Love with Him) (Toho, 30 May 1987) – Chisato Matsumae (debut)
- Sharam Q no Enka no Hanamichi (シャ乱Qの演歌の花道; Sharam Q's Enka Flower Path) (Fuji TV, 30 August 1997) – Herself (cameo)

=== TV ===
- TV Hacker (TVハッカー, TV Hakkā) (Fuji TV, 19 April – 27 September 1987) – assistant
- Announcer Puttsun Monogatari (アナウンサーぷっつん物語) (Fuji TV, 4 May 1987) – guest appearance (episode 5)
- Ginga TV Shōsetsu (銀河テレビ小説) – Manga Michi: Seishun-hen (まんが道・青春編) (NHK, 27 July 1987) – Mayumi Kōda (episode 6)
- Getsuyō Drama Land (月曜ドラマランド) – Gakuen Jōhōbu H.I.P. (ガクエン情報部H.I.P.) (Fuji TV, 21 September 1987) – Yūko Ichinose
- Tanpen Drama Series Kazoku (短編ドラマシリーズ 家族) – Kawa wa Nagareru (川は流れる) (NHK, 1 December 1987)
- Drama Onna no Shiki (ドラマ女の四季) – Haha to Ko no Sotsugyōshiki (母と子の卒業式) (TV Tokyo, 28 March 1988)

==== Kōhaku Uta Gassen appearances ====
Year / Broadcast	Appearance	Song	Appearance order	Opponent	Notes
1992 (Heisei 4) / 43rd	Debut	"Watashi ga Obasan ni Natte mo"	12/28	Kenichi Mikawa	Also performed a cover of "Candy Candy" with Hikaru Nishida and Miho Nakayama.
1993 (Heisei 5) / 44th	2	"Watashi no Natsu"	12/26	Masaharu Fukuyama	
1994 (Heisei 6) / 45th	3	"Suteki na Tanjōbi"	14/25	Hideki Saijo	
1995 (Heisei 7) / 46th	4	"Futari wa Koibito"	8/25	SMAP	
1996 (Heisei 8) / 47th	5	"La La Sunshine"	8/25	Hiromi Go	
1997 (Heisei 9) / 48th	6	"Sweet Candy"	9/25	Kiyoshi Maekawa	

== Bibliography ==
- New Season (朱夏 NEW SEASON) (Kindaieigasha, 5 August 1987)
- Wakari Yasui Koi (わかりやすい恋; Easy Love) by Gin'iro Natsuo (Kadokawa Shoten, 18 December 1987)
- Rikutsu ja nai. (りくつじゃない。; It's No Secret.) (Kodansha, 12 June 1989)
- Opera (オペラ) (CBS Sony, 20 October 1989)
- i-Realite (Hakusensha, 4 February 1991)
- Watashi ga Obasan ni Natte mo (私がオバさんになっても; Even If I Become an Old Lady) (S.S. Communications, 14 May 1992)
- Step by Step (Nippon Broadcasting Project/Fusosha Publishing, 1 May 1995)
- Step by Step: Moritaka Chisato Shashin-shū (STEP BY STEP 森高千里写真集, Step by Step: Chisato Moritaka's Photo Album) (Wani Books, 1 May 1995)
- Peachberry (Wani Books, 10 November 1997)
- Moritaka Chisato to Shika Ienai (森高千里としか言えない; Chisato Moritaka Is All I Can Say) by Nobuaki Onuki (Gentosha, 20 December 2012)
- Lyrics of Chisato Moritaka (森高千里 詞集, Moritaka Chisato Shi-shū) (Up-Front Group, 11 May 2013)
- Moritaka Chisato no Kurashi no Lesson (森高千里の暮らしのレッスン; Chisato Moritaka's Life Lessons) (Magazine House, 21 September 2016)
- "Kono Machi" ga Daisuki yo (「この街」が大好きよ; I Love "This Town") (Shueisha, 25 September 2020)
