= Live Rock Alive Complete =

Video by Chisato Moritaka
- Released: November 23, 2022
- Recorded: September 30, 1992
- Venue: Nakano Sunplaza; Nakano, Tokyo, Japan
- Language: Japanese
- Label: Warner Music Japan
- Producer: Yukio Seto

Chisato Moritaka chronology
Chisato Moritaka Live 2020 (2021)	Live Rock Alive Complete (2022)	Kono Machi Tour 2020–22 (2023)

Music videos
- Live Rock Alive Complete trailer on YouTube

Chisato Moritaka Concert Tour '92: Live Rock Alive Complete is a live video by Japanese singer-songwriter Chisato Moritaka. Recorded live at the Nakano Sunplaza in Nakano, Tokyo on September 30, 1992, the video was released on November 23, 2022, by Warner Music Japan to commemorate Moritaka's 35th anniversary. It is a digitally remastered version of the live video originally released on February 25, 1993, with two additional songs and previously unreleased footage. The video is offered on Blu-ray and DVD formats; each with a two-disc audio CD version of the concert. A limited edition Blu-ray boxed set includes a Blu-ray copy of the original 1993 cut, a digitally remastered version of the Rock Alive CD, a photo booklet, a miniature reprint of the original tour pamphlet, a sticker sheet, and a flyer.

The video peaked at No. 19 on Oricon's Blu-ray chart.

== Track listing ==
Blu-ray/DVD

All lyrics are written by Chisato Moritaka, except where indicated; all music is composed by Hideo Saitō, except where indicated.

No.	Title	Lyrics	Music	Length
1.	"Concert no Yoru" (Konsāto no Yoru (コンサートの夜; "Concert Night"))
2.	"Rhythm & Bass" (Rizumu to Bēsu (RHYTHMとBASS))		Hiroyoshi Matsuo
3.	"Fight!!" (Faito!! (ファイト！！))		Yuichi Takahashi
4.	"Natsu no Umi" ((夏の海; "The Summer Sea"))		Takahashi
5.	"Watashi ga Obasan ni Natte mo" ((わたしがオバさんになっても; "Even If I Become an Old Lady"))
6.	"Yowasete yo Kon'ya Dake" ((酔わせてよ今夜だけ; "Let Me Get Drunk Just for Tonight"))		Moritaka
7.	"The Blue Blues"		Shin Kono
8.	"The Benkyō no Uta*" (Za Benkyō no Uta (ザ・勉強の歌; "The Study Song"))
9.	"Wakarimashita" ((わかりました; "Understood"))		Masashi Yokoyama
10.	"Mitsuketa Saifu" ((見つけたサイフ; "The Wallet I Found"))
11.	"Rock Alive"
12.	"Kusai Mono ni wa Futa wo Shiro!!" ((臭いものにはフタをしろ！！; "Shut Your Stinking Trap!!"))
13.	"Ame (Album Version)" (Ame (Arubamu Vājon) (雨 (アルバム･ヴァージョン); "Rain" (Album Version)))		Seiji Matsuura
14.	"17-sai" (Jūnana-sai (17才; "17 Years Old"))	Mieko Arima	Kyōhei Tsutsumi
15.	"Yatchimai na" ((やっちまいな; "Crazy"))		Yasuaki Maejima
16.	"Sonogo no Watashi*" ((その後の私; "Me Afterwards"))
17.	"Get Smile"	Hiromasa Ijichi	Ken Shima
18.	"Ame Nochi Hare" ((雨のち晴れ; "Rain, Then Sun"))
19.	"Guitar" (Gitā (ギター))
20.	"Kono Machi (Home Mix)" ((この街 (HOME MIX); "This Town (Home Mix)"))
21.	"Seishun" ((青春; "Youth"))

* Previously unreleased track.

CD

Disc 1
No.	Title	Music	Length
1.	"Concert no Yoru"		5:09
2.	"Rhythm & Bass"	Matsuo	5:02
3.	"Fight!!"	Takahashi	4:54
4.	"Natsu no Umi"	Takahashi	4:45
5.	"Watashi ga Obasan ni Natte mo"		4:34
6.	"Yowasete yo Kon'ya Dake"	Moritaka	3:27
7.	"The Blue Blues"	Kōno	2:27
8.	"The Benkyō no Uta"		5:08
9.	"Wakarimashita"	Yokoyama	4:58
10.	"Mitsuketa Saifu"		4:36
11.	"Rock Alive"		3:22
Total length:			48:18

Disc 2
No.	Title	Lyrics	Music	Length
1.	"Kusai Mono ni wa Futa wo Shiro!!"			3:09
2.	"Ame (Album Version)"		Matsuura	5:12
3.	"17-sai"	Arima	Tsutsumi	4:51
4.	"Yatchimai na"		Maejima	3:39
5.	"Sonogo no Watashi"			3:50
6.	"Get Smile"	Ijichi	Shima	5:34
7.	"Ame Nochi Hare"			5:19
8.	"Guitar"			4:14
9.	"Kono Machi (Home Mix)"			4:24
10.	"Seishun"			4:44
Total length:				44:53

== Personnel ==
- Chisato Moritaka – vocals, guitar
- The London

- Yasuaki Maejima – keyboards, backing vocals
- Shin Kono – keyboards, guitar, backing vocals
- Hiroyoshi Matsuo – guitar, backing vocals
- Masafumi Yokoyama – bass, backing vocals
- Toshihiro Tsuchiya – drums

with

- Shinichi Baba as the Student on "The Blue Blues"

== Charts ==
Chart (2022)	Peak position
Blu-Ray Disc Chart (Oricon)	19
