= UHQCD The First Best Selection '87~'92 =

Compilation album by Chisato Moritaka
- Released: November 25, 2015
- Recorded: 1987–1992
- Genre: J-pop; pop rock; dance-pop
- Length: 77:16
- Language: Japanese
- Label: Warner Music Japan
- Producer: Yukio Seto

Chisato Moritaka chronology
Chisato Moritaka with tofubeats: Moritaka Tofu (2014)	UHQCD The First Best Selection '87~'92 (2015)	UHQCD The First Best Selection '93~'99 (2015)

UHQCD The First Best Selection '87~'92 is a compilation album by Japanese singer-songwriter Chisato Moritaka, released on November 25, 2015, by Warner Music Japan. The album compiles a selection of Moritaka's singles from 1987 to 1992 in Ultimate High Quality Compact Disc (UHQCD) format. It was released simultaneously with zetima's UHQCD The First Best Selection '93~'99.

The album peaked at No. 103 on Oricon's albums chart.

== Track listing ==
All lyrics are written by Chisato Moritaka, except where indicated; all music is composed and arranged by Hideo Saitō, except where indicated.

No.	Title	Lyrics	Music	Arrangement	Length
1.	"New Season"	HIRO			4:43
2.	"Mi-ha" (Mīhā (ミーハー))				4:59
3.	"Alone" (Arōn (アローン))		Shinji Yasuda	Yasuda	4:27
4.	"The Stress -Stress Chūkintō Version-" (Za Sutoresu -Sutoresu Chūkintō Bājon- (ザ・ストレス -ストレス 中近東バージョン-; "The Stress -Stress Middle East Version-"))				4:55
5.	"17-sai" (Jūnana-sai (17才; "17 Years Old"))	Mieko Arima	Kyōhei Tsutsumi		4:56
6.	"Daite (Las Vegas Version)" (Daite (Rasu Begasu Vājon) (だいて (ラスベガス・ヴァージョン); "Hold Me (Las Vegas Version)"))		Yuichi Takahashi	Takahashi	5:00
7.	"Michi" ((道; "Road"))		Yasuda		4:55
8.	"Kusai Mono ni wa Futa wo Shiro!!" ((臭いものにはフタをしろ!!; "Shut Your Stinking Trap!!"))				2:43
9.	"Ame" ((雨; "Rain"))		Seiji Matsuura		4:32
10.	"Benkyō no Uta" ((勉強の歌; "Study Song"))				4:42
11.	"Kono Machi (Home Mix)" ((この街（HOME MIX）; "This Town (Home Mix)"))				4:40
12.	"Fight!!" (Faito!! (ファイト!!))		Takahashi	Takahashi	5:00
13.	"Concert no Yoru" (Konsāto no Yoru (コンサートの夜; "Concert Night"))				4:48
14.	"Watashi ga Obasan ni Natte mo" ((私がオバさんになっても; "Even If I Become an Old Lady"))				4:56
15.	"Yoru no Entotsu" ((夜の煙突; "Night Chimney"))	Masataro Naoe	Naoe	Carnation	4:54
16.	"Rock 'n' Roll Kenchōshozaichi" (Rokkunrōru Kenchōshozaichi (ロックンロール県庁所在地; "Rock 'n' Roll Prefectural Government"))		Moritaka	Moritaka	2:30
17.	"Teriyaki Burger" (Teriyaki Bāgā (テリヤキ・バーガー))				4:36

== Charts ==
Chart (2015)	Peak position
Japanese Albums (Oricon)	103
