= Kono Machi Tour 2020–22 =

Video by Chisato Moritaka
- Released: October 18, 2023
- Recorded: December 5, 2021 (Matsudo); June 25, 2022 (Sapporo); March 28, 2022 (Haneda)
- Venue: Morino Hall 21, Matsudo, Chiba, Japan (tracks 1–16); Sapporo City Cultural Hall, Sapporo, Hokkaido, Japan (tracks 17–20); Zepp Haneda, Tokyo, Japan (Kono Machi Tour Special)
- Language: Japanese
- Label: Warner Music Japan
- Producer: Yukio Seto

Chisato Moritaka chronology
Live Rock Alive Complete (2022)	Kono Machi Tour 2020–22 (2023)	Kondo wa More Better yo! 2023–24 (2024)

Music video
- Official trailer on YouTube

Kono Machi Tour 2020–22 (「この街」TOUR 2020-22) is a live video by Japanese singer-songwriter Chisato Moritaka. Recorded live at the Morino Hall 21 in Matsudo, Chiba on December 5, 2021, the video was released on October 18, 2023, by Warner Music Japan. It also includes four bonus tracks filmed live at the Sapporo City Cultural Hall in Sapporo, Hokkaido on June 25, 2022. The video is offered on Blu-ray and DVD formats; each with an audio CD version of the Morino Hall 21 concert and a 44-page booklet. A Murket Store exclusive box set includes a bonus Blu-ray/UHQCD set featuring Moritaka's concert at Zepp Haneda on March 28, 2022.

The video peaked at No. 8 on Oricon's Blu-ray chart and No. 12 on Oricon's DVD chart.

== Track listing ==
All lyrics are written by Chisato Moritaka, except where indicated.

Blu-ray/DVD
No.	Title	Lyrics	Music	Length
1.	"Michi (道; "Road")"		Shinji Yasuda
2.	"Hadaka ni wa Naranai (はだかにはならない; "I Don't Get Naked")"		Masataro Naoe
3.	"Rock'n Omelette (ロックン・オムレツ, Rokkun Omuretsu)"		Hiromasa Ijichi
4.	"Fight!! (ファイト！！, Faito!!)"		Yuichi Takahashi
5.	"Ame (Rock Version) (雨 (ロック・ヴァージョン), Ame (Rokku Vājon); "Rain" (Rock Version))"		Seiji Matsuura
6.	"Sunrise (サンライズ, Sanraizu)"		Takahashi
7.	"17-sai (17才, Jūnana-sai; "17 Years Old")"	Mieko Arima	Kyōhei Tsutsumi
8.	"Watashi ga Obasan ni Natte mo (私がオバさんになっても; "Even If I Become an Old Lady")"		Hideo Saitō
9.	"Watarasebashi (渡良瀬橋; "Watarase Bridge")"		Saitō
10.	"So Blue"		Ijichi
11.	"La La Sunshine (ララ サンシャイン, Ra Ra Sanshain)"		Ijichi
12.	"Kibun Sōkai (気分爽快; "Refreshing")"		Kenichi Kurosawa
13.	"Hae Otoko (ハエ男; "Fly Man")"		Moritaka
14.	"Kono Machi (この街; "This Town")"		Saitō
15.	"Te wo Tatakō (手をたたこう; "Clap Your Hands")" (Encore)		Moritaka
16.	"Concert no Yoru (コンサートの夜, Konsāto no Yoru; "Concert Night")" (Encore)		Saitō
17.	"Tomodachi no Kare (友達の彼; "His Friend")"		Ijichi
18.	"La La Sunshine" (Brand New Remix)		Ijichi
19.	"Anata wa Ninki Mono (あなたは人気者; "You Are a Popular Person")"		Shin Kono
20.	"Teriyaki Burger (テリヤキ・バーガー, Teriyaki Bāgā)"		Saitō

CD
No.	Title	Lyrics	Music	Length
1.	"Michi"		Yasuda	4:58
2.	"Hadaka ni wa Naranai"		Naoe	2:53
3.	"Rock'n Omelette"		Ijichi	2:27
4.	"Fight!!"		Takahashi	4:53
5.	"Ame (Rock Version)"		Matsuura	4:53
6.	"Sunrise"		Takahashi	4:03
7.	"17-sai"	Arima	Tsutsumi	4"52
8.	"Watashi ga Obasan ni Natte mo"		Saitō	4:36
9.	"Watarasebashi"		Saitō	3:43
10.	"So Blue"		Ijichi	4:29
11.	"La La Sunshine"		Ijichi	3:39
12.	"Kibun Sōkai"		Kurosawa	3:52
13.	"Hae Otoko"		Moritaka	3:52
14.	"Kono Machi"		Saitō	4:46
15.	"Te wo Tatakō"		Moritaka	3:24
16.	"Concert no Yoru"		Saitō	4:50
Total length:				66:16

Murket Store exclusive Kono Machi Tour Special: Zepp Haneda (March 28, 2022)
No.	Title	Lyrics	Music	Length
1.	"47 Hard Nights"	Ijichi	Saitō
2.	"Pepperland (ペパーランド, Pepārando)"		Kōno
3.	"Daibōken (大冒険; "Great Adventure")"		Saitō
4.	"Wasuremono (忘れ物; "Lost Item")"		Saitō
5.	"Taifū (台風; "Typhoon")"		Ijichi
6.	"Yatchimai na (やっちまいな; "Crazy")"		Yasuaki Maejima
7.	"Aoi Umi (青い海; "The Blue Sea")"		Hiroyoshi Matsuo
8.	"Tōi Mukashi (遠い昔; "A Long Time Ago")"		Takahashi
9.	"Jitensha Tsūgaku (自転車通学; "Bicycle Commuting")"		Takahashi
10.	"Fight!!"		Takahashi
11.	"Watarasebashi"		Saitō
12.	"Tony Slavin"		Moritaka
13.	"The Busters Blues (ザ・バスターズ・ブルース, Za Basutāzu Burūsu)"		Saitō
14.	"The Mi-ha (ザ・ミーハー, Za Mīhā)" (2015 Ver.)		Saitō
15.	"Alone"		Yasuda
16.	"Let Me Go"	Ijichi; Moritaka	Yasuda
17.	"Get Smile"	Ijichi	Ken Shima
18.	"Memories"		Saitō
19.	"Step by Step"		Takahashi
20.	"Watashi ga Obasan ni Natte mo"		Saitō

== Personnel ==
- Chisato Moritaka – vocals, rhythm guitar, drums, alto recorder
- The White Queen

- Yuichi Takahashi – guitar
- Maria Suzuki – guitar
- Yu Yamagami – keyboards
- Masafumi Yokoyama – bass
- Akira Sakamoto – drums

== Charts ==
Chart (2023)	Peak position
Blu-Ray Disc Chart (Oricon)	8
DVD Chart (Oricon)	12
