= The Moritaka Tour 1991.8.22 at Shibuya Public Hall =

- Blu-ray box set cover

Video by Chisato Moritaka
- Released: July 26, 2017
- Recorded: August 22, 1991
- Venue: Shibuya Public Hall; Shibuya, Tokyo, Japan
- Length: 102 minutes
- Language: Japanese
- Label: Warner Music Japan
- Producer: Yukio Seto

Chisato Moritaka chronology
Love Vol. 9 (2015)	The Moritaka Tour 1991.8.22 at Shibuya Public Hall (2017)	Watarasebashi Complete Version (2017)

Music video
- The Moritaka Tour 1991.8.22 at Shibuya Public Hall trailer on YouTube

The Moritaka Tour 1991.8.22 at Shibuya Public Hall (「ザ・森高」ツアー1991.8.22 at 渋谷公会堂) is a live video by Japanese singer-songwriter Chisato Moritaka. Recorded live at the Shibuya Public Hall in Shibuya, Tokyo on August 22, 1991, the video was released on July 26, 2017, by Warner Music Japan on Blu-ray and DVD formats; each with a two-disc audio CD version of the concert. A limited edition Blu-ray box set includes The Moritaka in Ultimate High Quality CD (UHQCD) and double-LP formats. The video was released to commemorate Moritaka's 30th anniversary in the music industry.

The video peaked at No. 28 on Oricon's Blu-ray chart and at No. 80 on Oricon's DVD chart.

== Track listing ==
Blu-ray/DVD

All lyrics are written by Chisato Moritaka, except where indicated; all music is composed by Hideo Saitō, except where indicated.

No.	Title	Lyrics	Music	Length
1.	"Kanojo" ((彼女; "She"))
2.	"Mijikai Natsu" ((短い夏; "A Short Summer"))		Kyōhei Tsutsumi
3.	"The Benkyō no Uta" ((ザ・勉強の歌; "The Study Song"))
4.	"Seishun" ((青春; "Youth"))
5.	"Aru OL no Seishun ~ A-ko no Baai ~ (Moritaka Connection)" (Aru Ō Ēru no Seishun ~ Ē-ko no Baai ~ (Moritaka Konekushon) (あるOLの青春～A子の場合～ (森高コネクション); "A Certain Young Office Lady ~ In the case of Child A ~ (Moritaka Connection)"))
6.	"The Mi-ha" (Za Mīhā (ザ・ミーハー))
7.	"Ame" ((雨; "Rain"))		Seiji Matsuura
8.	"The Nozokanaide" ((ザ・のぞかないで; "The Don't Look"))
9.	"The Stress" (Za Sutoresu (ザ・ストレス))
10.	"New Season"	HIRO
11.	"Kusai Mono ni wa Futa wo Shiro!! (Ojisan Version)" (Kusai Mono ni wa Futa wo Shiro!! (Ojisan Vājon) (臭いものにはフタをしろ！！ (おじさんヴァージョン); "Shut Your Stinking Trap!! (Uncle Version)))
12.	"Sonogo no Watashi (Moritaka Connection)" (Sonogo no Watashi (Moritaka Konekushon) (その後の私 [森高コネクション]; "Me Afterwards (Moritaka Connection)"))
13.	"Yoru no Entotsu" ((夜の煙突; "Night Chimney"))	Masataro Naoe	Naoe
14.	"Get Smile"	Hiromasa Ijichi	Ken Shima
15.	"Hachigatsu no Koi (Encore 1)" ((八月の恋; "Love in August"))		Tsutsumi
16.	"Funky Monkey Baby" (Fankī Monkī Beibī (ファンキー・モンキー・ベイビー))	George Ōkura	Eikichi Yazawa
17.	"Teriyaki Burger" (Teriyaki Bāgā (テリヤキ・バーガー))
18.	"Kono Machi (Encore 2)" ((この街; "This Town"))

CD

Disc 1
No.	Title	Lyrics	Music	Length
1.	"Kanojo"
2.	"Mijikai Natsu"		Tsutsumi
3.	"The Benkyō no Uta"
4.	"Seishun"
5.	"Aru OL no Seishun ~ A-ko no Baai ~ (Moritaka Connection)"
6.	"The Mi-ha"
7.	"Ame"		Matsuura
8.	"The Nozokanaide"
9.	"The Stress"
10.	"New Season"	HIRO
11.	"Kusai Mono ni wa Futa wo Shiro!! (Ojisan Version)"
12.	"Sonogo no Watashi (Moritaka Connection)"
13.	"Yoru no Entotsu"	Naoe	Naoe
14.	"Get Smile"	Ijichi	Shima

Disc 2
No.	Title	Lyrics	Music	Length
1.	"Hachigatsu no Koi"		Tsutsumi
2.	"Funky Monkey Baby"	Ōkura	Yazawa
3.	"Teriyaki Burger"
4.	"Kono Machi"

== Personnel ==
- Chisato Moritaka – vocals
- Yasuaki Maejima – keyboards
- Shin Kono – keyboards
- Hiroyoshi Matsuo – guitar
- Masafumi Yokoyama – bass
- Makoto Yoshiwara – drums

== Charts ==
Chart (2017)	Peak position
Blu-Ray Disc Chart (Oricon)	28
DVD Chart (Oricon)	80
