= YouTube Public Recording & Live at Yokohama Blitz =

Live album by Chisato Moritaka
- Released: May 15, 2013
- Recorded: November 24, 2012
- Venue: Yokohama Blitz; Yokohama, Japan
- Length: 74:16 (CD); 91:00 (DVD)
- Language: Japanese
- Label: Up-Front Works
- Producer: Yukio Seto

Chisato Moritaka chronology
The Singles (2012)	YouTube Public Recording & Live at Yokohama Blitz (2013)	Chisato Moritaka with tofubeats: Moritaka Tofu (2014)

Music video
- YouTube Public Recording & Live at Yokohama Blitz CD digest on YouTube
- YouTube Public Recording & Live at Yokohama Blitz DVD digest on YouTube

YouTube Public Recording & Live at Yokohama Blitz (Youtube 公開収録＆Live at Yokohama BLITZ, YūChūbu Kōkai Shūroku ando Raibu atto Yokohama Burittsu) is a live album by Japanese singer-songwriter Chisato Moritaka, released on May 15, 2013, by Up-Front Works. Recorded live at the Yokohama Blitz in Yokohama, Japan on November 24, 2012, this was Moritaka's first-ever live album and was part of her personal campaign to self-cover 200 songs on her YouTube channel. The album includes a bonus DVD that highlights the making of four self-cover videos.

The album peaked at No. 69 on Oricon's albums chart and No. 57 on Billboard Japan's top albums sales chart.

== Track listing ==
All lyrics are written by Chisato Moritaka, except where indicated.

CD: Live at Yokohama Blitz
No.	Title	Lyrics	Music	Length
1.	"Watashi ga Obasan ni Natte mo" ((私がオバさんになっても; "Even If I Become an Old Lady"))		Hideo Saitō	4:22
2.	"MC 1"			1:19
3.	"Period" (Piriodo (ピリオド))	HIRO	Saitō	4:42
4.	"Fight!!" (Faito!! (ファイト！！))		Yuichi Takahashi	5:09
5.	"MC 2"			6:09
6.	"Aru OL ga Obasan ni Natte mo" ((あるOLがオバさんになっても; "Even if an Office Lady Becomes an Old Lady"))		Saitō	3:55
7.	"Michi" ((道; "Road"))		Shinji Yasuda	5:13
8.	"MC 3"			2:53
9.	"Tony Slavin"		Moritaka	4:45
10.	"MC 4"			0:41
11.	"La La Sunshine" (Rara Sanshain (ララ サンシャイン))		Hiromasa Ijichi	3:37
12.	"Futari wa Koibito" ((二人は恋人; "We Are a Pair of Lovers"))		Saitō	4:13
13.	"MC 5"			0:45
14.	"Kibun Sōkai" ((気分爽快; "Refreshing"))		Kenichi Kurosawa	3:52
15.	"Mite" ((見て; "Look"))		Saitō	5:03
16.	"MC 6"			1:35
17.	"Concert no Yoru" (Konsāto no Yoru (コンサートの夜; "Concert Night"))		Saitō	4:56
18.	"MC 7"			3:55
19.	"Every Day"		Takahashi	7:04
Total length:				74:16

DVD: YouTube Public Recording
No.	Title	Lyrics	Music	Length
1.	"Opening MC"			4:08
2.	"Talk 1"			8:41
3.	"New Season"	HIRO	Saitō	5:25
4.	"Talk 2"			3:56
5.	"Rock 'n' Roll Kenchōshozaichi" (Rokkunrōru Kenchōshozaichi (ロックンロール県庁所在地; "Rock 'n' Roll Prefectural Government"))		Moritaka	2:30
6.	"Talk 3"			4:22
7.	"Get Smile [Take 1]"	Ijichi	Ken Shima	4:34
8.	"Talk 4"			2:47
9.	"Get Smile [Take 2]"	Ijichi	Shima	4:42
10.	"Talk 5"			1:38
11.	"17-sai [Take 1]" (Jūnana-sai (17才; "17 Years Old"))	Mieko Arima	Tsutsumi	4:57
12.	"Talk 6"			2:09
13.	"17-sai [Take 2]"	Arima	Tsutsumi	6:20
14.	"Talk 1"			3:24
15.	"New Season [Take 1]"	HIRO	Saitō	5:35
16.	"Talk 2"			1:55
17.	"New Season [Take 2]"	HIRO	Saitō	5:34
18.	"Talk 3"			1:16
19.	"Rock 'n' Roll Kenchōsozaichi"		Moritaka	2:42
20.	"Talk 4"			0:49
21.	"Get Smile"	Ijichi	Shima	6:21
22.	"Talk 5"			1:12
23.	"17-sai"	Arima	Tsutsumi	4:59
24.	"Ending"			1:25
Total length:				91 minutes

- Tracks 1–13 are for vocal recording. Tracks 14–24 are for drums recording.

== Personnel ==
- Chisato Moritaka – vocals (CD & DVD), drums (DVD)
- Yuichi Takahashi – guitar, keyboard, backing vocals
- Shinji Yasuda – drums, backing vocals

== Charts ==
Chart (2013)	Peak position
Japanese Top Albums (Billboard)	57
Japanese Albums (Oricon)	69
