= UHQCD The First Best Selection '93~'99 =

Compilation album by Chisato Moritaka
- Released: November 25, 2015
- Recorded: 1993–1999
- Genre: J-pop; pop rock
- Length: 74:32
- Language: Japanese; English
- Label: zetima
- Producer: Yukio Seto

Chisato Moritaka chronology
UHQCD The First Best Selection '87~'92 (2015)	UHQCD The First Best Selection '93~'99 (2015)

UHQCD The First Best Selection '93~'99 is a compilation album by Japanese singer-songwriter Chisato Moritaka, released on November 25, 2015, by zetima. The album compiles a selection of Moritaka's singles from 1993 to 1999 in Ultimate High Quality Compact Disc (UHQCD) format. It was released simultaneously with Warner Music Japan's UHQCD The First Best Selection '87~'92.

The album peaked at No. 111 on Oricon's albums chart.

== Track listing ==
All lyrics are written by Chisato Moritaka, except where indicated; all music is arranged by Yuichi Takahashi, except where indicated.

No.	Title	Lyrics	Music	Arrangement	Length
1.	"Watarasebashi" ((渡良瀬橋; "Watarase Bridge"))		Hideo Saitō	Saitō	3:48
2.	"Watashi no Natsu" ((私の夏; "My Summer"))		Saitō	Saitō	4:21
3.	"Kaze ni Fukarete" ((風に吹かれて; "Blowing in the Wind"))		Saitō	Saitō	4:49
4.	"Kibun Sōkai" ((気分爽快; "Refreshing"))		Kenichi Kurosawa		4:00
5.	"Futari wa Koibito" ((二人は恋人; "We Are a Pair of Lovers"))		Saitō	Saitō	4:19
6.	"Jin Jin Jingle Bell" (Jin Jin Jinguru Beru (ジン ジン ジングルベル))		Moritaka		3:44
7.	"So Blue"		Hiromasa Ijichi		4:39
8.	"La La Sunshine" (Rara Sanshain (ララ サンシャイン))		Ijichi		3:45
9.	"Gin'iro no Yume" ((銀色の夢; "The Silver Colored Dream"))		Ijichi		4:08
10.	"Let's Go!"		Ijichi		4:28
11.	"Sweet Candy"		Takahashi		4:57
12.	"Snow Again"		Takahashi		4:25
13.	"Umi made 5-fun" (Umi made Go-fun (海まで5分; "5 Minutes to the Sea"))		Toshinobu Kubota	Yasuaki Maejima	4:15
14.	"Watashi no Yō ni" ((私のように; "Like Me"))		Shin Kono	Kōno	5:06
15.	"Dekiru Desho!!" ((出来るでしょ！！; "You Can Do It!!"))		Ijichi		4:32
16.	"Wakasa no Hiketsu" ((若さの秘訣; "The Secret to Youth"))		Moritaka	Moritaka	3:35
17.	"Everybody's Got Something to Hide Except Me and My Monkey"	Lennon–McCartney	Lennon–McCartney		2:31
18.	"Here Comes the Sun"	George Harrison	Harrison		3:11

== Charts ==
Chart (2015)	Peak position
Japanese Albums (Oricon)	111
