= Moeko =

- Gender: Female

Origin
- Origin: Japanese
- Meaning: Different meanings depending on the kanji used

Moeko (written: 萌子, 萌映子 or もえこ in hiragana) is a feminine Japanese given name. People with this name include:

- Moeko Matsushita (松下 萌子; born 1982), Japanese singer and actress
- Moeka Haruhi (春日 萌花; born 1984), Japanese professional wrestler who formerly used the stage name Moeko Shitennouji (四天王寺 萌子)
- Moeko Fujimoto (藤本 もえこ; born 1992), Japanese ice hockey forward
- Moeko Nagaoka (長岡 萌映子; born 1993), Japanese basketball player
