= Rock Alive =

1992 studio album by Chisato Moritaka

Studio album by Chisato Moritaka
- Released: March 25, 1992
- Recorded: 1991–1992
- Studio: The Hit Factory (London)
- Length: 74:18
- Language: Japanese
- Label: Warner Music Japan
- Producer: Yukio Seto; Hideo Saitō

Chisato Moritaka chronology
The Moritaka (1991)	Rock Alive (1992)	Pepperland (1992)

Singles from Rock Alive
- 1. "Fight!!" Released: October 25, 1991; 2. "Concert no Yoru" Released: February 25, 1992; 3. "Watashi ga Obasan ni Natte mo" Released: June 25, 1992

Alternative cover
- Limited edition inner cover

Rock Alive (ロック・アライヴ, Rokku Araivu) is the sixth studio album by Japanese singer/songwriter Chisato Moritaka, released on March 25, 1992, by Warner Music Japan. The album was recorded at The Hit Factory in London. A limited edition release included a 32-page photo book.

The album reached No. 3 on Oricon's albums chart and sold over 314,000 copies. It was also certified Platinum by the RIAJ in April 1994.

== Track listing ==
All lyrics are written by Chisato Moritaka.

No.	Title	Music	Arrangement	Length
1.	"Concert no Yoru (Album Version)" (Konsāto no Yoru (Arubamu Vājon) (コンサートの夜 (アルバム・ヴァージョン); Concert Night (Album Version)))	Hideo Saitō	Saitō	5:21
2.	"Yatchimai na" ((やっちまいな; "Crazy"))	Yasuaki Maejima	Saitō; Moritaka	3:20
3.	"Watashi ga Obasan ni Natte mo" ((私がオバさんになっても; "Even If I Become an Old Lady"))	Saitō	Saitō	4:51
4.	"Obasan" ((叔母さん; "Aunt"))	Hiromasa Ijichi	Yuichi Takahashi	5:40
5.	"Guitar" (Gitā (ギター))	Saitō	Saitō	4:18
6.	"The Blue Blues"	Shin Kono	Kono	2:13
7.	"Fight!! (Album Version)" (Faito!! (Arubamu Vājon) (ファイト！！ (アルバム・ヴァージョン)))	Takahashi	Takahashi	4:58
8.	"Furusato no Sora" ((ふるさとの空; "The Hometown Sky"))	Takahashi	Takayuki Hattori	5:33
9.	"Rock Alive"	Saitō	Saitō	3:51
10.	"Yowasete yo Kon'ya Dake" ((酔わせてよ今夜だけ; "Let Me Get Drunk Just for Tonight"))	Moritaka	Kōno	3:29
11.	"Mitsuketa Saifu" ((見つけたサイフ; "The Wallet I Found"))	Saitō	Saitō	4:35
12.	"Rhythm and Bass" (Rizumu to Bēsu (RHYTHMとBASS))	Hiroyoshi Matsuo	Matsuo	5:39
13.	"Wakarimashita" ((わかりました; "Understood"))	Masashi Yokoyama	Yokoyama; Takahashi	4:57
14.	"Bossa Marina"	Hattori	Hattori	5:48
15.	"Natsu no Umi" ((夏の海; "The Summer Sea"))	Takahashi	Takahashi	4:35
16.	"Ame Nochi Hare" ((雨のち晴れ; "Rain, Then Sun"))	Saitō	Saitō	5:08
Total length:				74:18

== Personnel ==
- Chisato Moritaka – vocals, guitar (9)
- Hideo Saitō – all instruments, programming, backing vocals (all tracks except where indicated)
- Yasuaki Maejima – keyboards, piano, programming (2, 7)
- Yuichi Takahashi – guitar, synthesizer, programming, backing vocals (4, 7, 13, 15)
- Hiromasa Ijichi – piano (4)
- Nobuo Kurata – piano (8, 14)
- Shin Kōno – Fender Rhodes, programming, (6, 10)
- Yukie Matsuo – keyboard (12)
- Yukio Seto – guitar, (4, 6, 10), Fender Rhodes (14)
- Hiroyoshi Matsuo – guitar, programming (7, 12, 13)
- Masafumi Yokoyama – bass, guitar, programming, backing vocals (4 13, 15)
- Kenji Takamizu – bass (14)
- Eiji Shimamura – drums (14)
- Seiji Matsuura – backing vocals (1)
- Gavyn Wright – strings (8, 14)
- Jeff Daly – alto flute (14)
- Ron Asprey – alto flute (14)
- Steve Sidwell – flugelhorn (14)

== Charts ==
Chart (1992)	Peak position
Japanese Albums (Oricon)	3

== Certification ==
Region	Certification	Certified units/sales
Japan (RIAJ)	Gold	200,000^{^}
^{^} Shipments figures based on certification alone.

== Cover versions ==
- Sanae Johnouchi covered "Yowasete yo Kon'ya Dake" as her eighth single on August 25, 1993.

== Video album ==
Rock Alive

Video by Chisato Moritaka
- Released: June 25, 1992
- Genre: J-pop; pop rock
- Language: Japanese
- Label: Warner Music Japan

Chisato Moritaka chronology
Kokon Tozai ~ Oni ga Deru ka Hebi ga Deru ka Tour Live Video Vol. 4 (1991)	Rock Alive (1992)	Live Rock Alive (1993)

The video album for Rock Alive was released on LaserDisc and VHS on June 25, 1992. Its contents were compiled in the 2000 DVD Chisato Moritaka DVD Collection No. 6: Kusai Mono ni wa Futa wo Shiro!!/Rock Alive.

=== Track listing ===
All lyrics are written by Chisato Moritaka.

No.	Title	Music	Arrangement	Length
1.	"Rock Alive"	Saitō	Saitō
2.	"Benkyō no Uta" ((勉強の歌; "Study Song"))	Saitō	Saitō
3.	"The Benkyō no Uta (Live August 22, 1991, at Shibuya Public Hall)" ((ザ・勉強の歌 -LIVE- 1991年8月22日 渋谷公会堂))	Saitō	Saitō
4.	"The Blue Blues"	Kōno	Kōno
5.	"Mitsuketa Saifu" ((見つけたサイフ; "The Wallet I Found"))	Saitō	Saitō
6.	"Hachigatsu no Koi" ((八月の恋; "Love in August"))	Kyōhei Tsutsumi	Saitō
7.	"Making / NG Shū ~ Natsu no Umi" ((メイキング / NG集～夏の海; "Making / NG Collection ~ The Summer Sea"))	Takahashi	Takahashi
