= Akira Tsuburaya =

Japanese film and television producer

- 円谷 粲
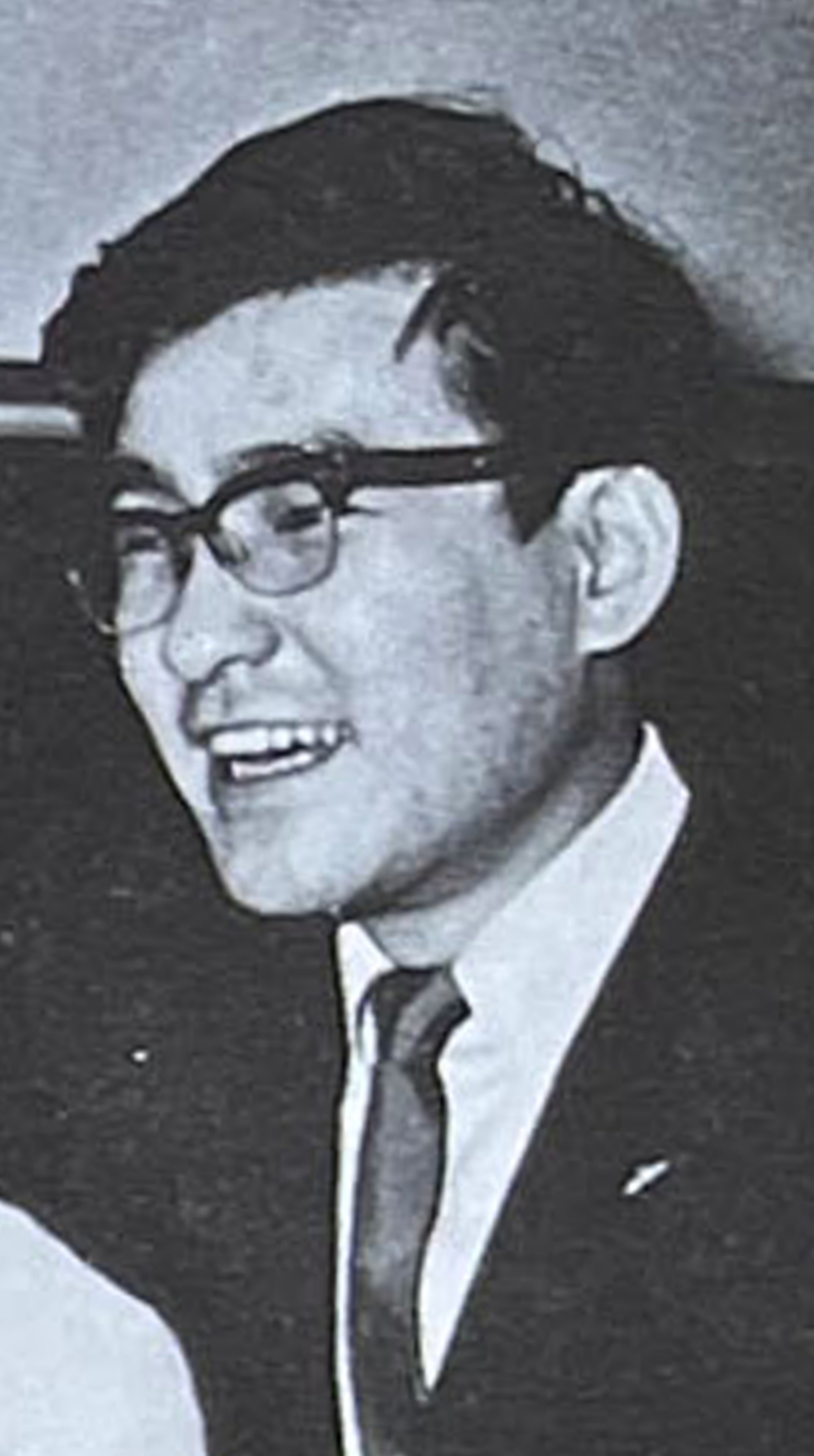
- Tsuburaya, c. 1965
- Born: February 12, 1944 (age 82); Tokyo, Japan
- Education: Tamagawa University
- Occupations: Film and television producer
- Years active: 1965–2006
- Children: Yūko Tsuburaya
- Parents: Eiji Tsuburaya (father); Masano Araki (mother)

Japanese name
- Kanji: 円谷 粲
- Kana: つぶらや あきら
Transcriptions
- Romanization: Tsuburaya Akira

Akira Tsuburaya (円谷 粲(あきら), Tsuburaya Akira; born February 12, 1944) is a former Japanese film and television producer. The third son of special effects director Eiji Tsuburaya, he began his career at his father's company Tsuburaya Productions while at Tamagawa University in 1966. Tsuburaya had an extremely prolific five-decade career in film and television, during which he worked on over 80 productions.

== Life and career ==
Akira Tsuburaya was born on February 12, 1944 in Tokyo. He was the third son of special effects pioneer Eiji Tsuburaya and his wife Masano Araki as well as their first child to be baptized. While at Tamagawa University, Tsuburaya began his career working in film at his father's company Tsuburaya Productions on the domestically popular Ultra Q episode, "Kanegon's Cocoon" as an assistant director in 1965. He subsequently returned to work as an assistant director on the Ultra Q episode "Challenge From the Year 2020" and the following year worked in the same position on Ultraman (TV 1966-1967). He later served as the chief assistant director of special effects on Ultraseven (TV 1967) and was also an assistant director on Operation: Mystery! (1968).

Tsuburaya began working as a producer in 1970, receiving his first credit in that position on Chibira-kun in the same year. He continued working at Tsuburaya Productions on productions such as Triple Fighter (1972), Fireman (1973) Army of the Apes, Pro-Wrestling Star Aztecaser Ultraman Leo (both 1974), Dinosaur War Izenborg (1977), and Star Wolf (1978) until leaving the company in June 1989.

In July 1989, a month after leaving, he established Tsuburaya Eizo. He would serve as executive producer for many television shows by his company, including Babel II: Beyond Infinity (2001) and Genma Wars: Eve of Mythology (2002). In February 2002, he rejoined Tsuburaya Productions and became the head of the production department as vice president. In May 2005, however, he left Tsuburaya Productions once again and was appointed director of Tsuburaya Dream Factory that June.

== Filmography ==
Year	Title	Position	Notes	Ref(s)
1966	Ultra Q	Assistant director	Episodes "Kanegon's Cocoon" & "Challenge From the Year 2020"	
1966	Ultraman	Assistant director	Four episodes	
1967	Ultraseven	Assistant director	Of special effects	
1968	Operation: Mystery!	Assistant director		
1970	Chibira-kun	Producer		
1972	Triple Fighter	Producer		
1973	Fireman	Producer		
1974	Army of the Apes	Producer		
1974	Ultraman Leo	Producer		
1976	Star of Pro-Wrestling Aztecaser	Producer		
1976	Kyoryu Tankentai Born Free	Producer		
1977	Dinosaur War Izenborg	Producer		
1978	Dinosaur Corps Koseidon	Producer		
1978	Star Wolf	Executive producer		
1979	White Hand, Beautiful Hand, Cursed Hand	Executive producer		
1980	Bizarre! Golden-eyed Girl	Executive producer		
1980	Vengeful Spirit! Sneering Doll	Executive producer		
1980	Bokura Yakyu Tanteidan	Executive producer		
1981	All Robots Who Can Feel Gather	Executive producer		
1982	Princess Sakurako, the Evil Spirit	Executive producer		
1982	Cute Demon	Executive producer		
1982	Midare Karakuri	Executive producer		
1983	In the Eye of the Devil	Executive producer		
1983	The Legendary Ghost Cat	Executive producer		
1983	Picture Book of Sweets	Executive producer		
1983	The Lost Honor of Natsuko Aizawa	Executive producer		
1983	Adventurous Trip to the End of the Universe	Executive producer		
1984	Cursed Mannequin Doll	Executive producer		
1984	Popular Kaiju Parade	Executive producer		
1984	Two Women	Executive producer		
1985	The Night I Died	Executive producer		
1985	Demon Within	Producer		
1986	The Samurai	Executive producer		
1987	Fear of 3:00 AM	Executive producer		
1988	Sorry for the Wait! The Complete Works of Ultraman	Executive producer		
1988	Office Love	Executive producer		
1989	Pursue the 7 Mysteries of Ultraman!	Executive producer		
1989	Decision! Best Ten of Ultraman	Executive producer		
1990	Superman Detective Schwatch	Executive producer		
1990	Ultra Q The Movie: Legend of the Stars	Producer		
1991	Crystal Blue Shadow	Executive producer		
1991	Yōka Mandragora's Counterattack	Executive producer		
1991	Skyscraper Hunting	Planner		
1991	Mikadroid	Producer		
1993	Legendary Fairy Woman, Siren 1	Planner		
1994	Legendary Fairy Woman, Siren 2	Planner		
1995	Corporate Warrior Yamazaki	Planner		
1995	Prisoner Maria: The Movie	Producer		
1995	Female Prisoner Executioner Maria 2	Producer		
1995	White Coat of Amazoness	Producer		
1995	Legendary Fairy Woman, Siren 3			
1996	Heisei Shameless Academy	Executive producer		
1996	Legendary Fairy Woman, Siren 4	Planner		
1997	The Messiah from the Future	Planner		
1997	Devil Summoner	Executive producer		
1998	I Want to Play and Live for the Rest of My Life	Planner/Acting role		
1998	Kachiri the Locksmith	Executive producer		
1998	The Mysterious Transfer Student	Planner		
1998	Neptune in Dotsuki Dotsukare	Planner		
1998	Women Who Slept with Bubbles	Producer		
1998	Informant (Chikuri) Maru Backstory Investigation	Executive producer		
1998	Rosetta: The Masked Angel	Executive producer		
1999	Danger de mort	Planner		
1999	The Man Who Shot Don	Planner		
2000	Būba Sensei	Executive producer		
2000	Chinpira	Producer		
2001	STAR BOWS	Executive producer		
2001	Zombie Snake	Planner		
2002	Wild 7: another	Executive producer		
2002	Barom-1	Executive producer		
2002	Genma Wars: Eve of Mythology	Executive producer		
2002	Beast Fighter	Executive producer		
2002	Demon Lord Dante	Executive producer		
2002	Got Mars	Executive producer		
2002	Babel II	Executive producer		
2002	Submarine Super 99	Executive producer		
2002	Gun Frontier	Executive producer		
2002	Cosmo Warrior Zero	Executive producer		
2002	Fortune Dogs	Executive producer		
2004	Eko Eko Azarak	Producer		
2004	Space Symphony Maetel; ~Galaxy Express 999 Gaiden~	Producer		
2004	Mysterious Case Special Investigation Team; S.R.I Laughing Fire Daruma Man	Executive producer		
2005	Kazuo Umezu's Horror Theater	Planner	Six-part film	
2006	A Chain of Cursed Murders	Planner		
2006	Cat Eyed Boy	Planner		
2008	Bringing Godzilla Down to Size	Interviewee		
