= Taiyo (Chisato Moritaka album) =

Studio album by Chisato Moritaka
- Released: July 15, 1996
- Recorded: 1995–1996
- Genre: J-pop; pop rock; folk-pop
- Length: 57:33
- Language: Japanese; English
- Label: One Up Music
- Producer: Yukio Seto; Shin Hashimoto; Yuichi Takahashi

Chisato Moritaka chronology
Do the Best (1996)	Taiyo (1996)	Peachberry (1997)

Singles from Taiyo
- 1. "Yasumi no Gogo" Released: October 10, 1995; 2. "So Blue" Released: February 19, 1996; 3. "La La Sunshine" Released: June 10, 1996

Taiyo (たいよう, Taiyō; lit. Sun) is the 10th studio album by Japanese singer/songwriter Chisato Moritaka, released on July 15, 1996, by One Up Music. The album features the hit singles "Yasumi no Gogo", "So Blue", and "La La Sunshine", as well as two commercial jingles for Suntory liquor products. "Gin Gin Gin" served as the basis for Moritaka's 1995 Christmas single "Jin Jin Jingle Bell". Taiyo is also the second album in Moritaka's catalog to include a cover version of a Beatles song. A limited edition release included a lenticular cover featuring Moritaka changing her facial expressions and a 10-page photo book.

The album reached No. 3 on Oricon's albums chart and sold over 386,000 copies. It was also Moritaka's last album to be certified Platinum by the RIAJ.

== Track listing ==
All lyrics are written by Chisato Moritaka, except where indicated; all music is arranged by Yuichi Takahashi, except where indicated.

No.	Title	Lyrics	Music	Arrangement	Length
1.	"Natsu wa Paralleilon (La La Sunshine Part 2)" (Natsu wa Parareiron (Ra Ra Sanshain Pātsu Tsū) (夏はパラレイロン（ララサンシャインPart2）; "Summer is a Paralleilon (La La Sunshine Part 2)"))		Hiromasa Ijichi		3:38
2.	"Dekiru Desho!!" ((出来るでしょ!!; "You Can Do It!!"))		Ijichi		4:30
3.	"Gin Gin Gin"		Moritaka	Moritaka	2:36
4.	"Aki no Sora" ((秋の空; "Autumn Sky"))		Takahashi		4:26
5.	"Chōnan to Inakamon" ((長男と田舎もん; "The Elder Son and the Countryside"))		Ijichi		3:15
6.	"So Blue"		Ijichi		4:37
7.	"Taiyō to Aoi Tsuki" ((太陽と青い月; "The Sun and the Blue Moon"))		Moritaka	Yasuaki Maejima	4:28
8.	"Yasumi no Gogo" ((休みの午後; "Holiday Afternoon"))		Hideo Saitō	Saitō	4:40
9.	"La La Sunshine" (Ra Ra Sanshain (ララサンシャイン))		Ijichi		3:43
10.	"Tō ga Tatsu" ((薹が立つ; "Past Her Prime"))		Ijichi		3:22
11.	"Yoru no Umi" ((夜の海; "The Night Ocean"))		Takahashi		4:52
12.	"Hey! Vodka"	Dorsey Uotsuka	Moritaka	Moritaka	2:26
13.	"Tereya" ((照れ屋; "Shy"))		Kaoru Sanada		3:56
14.	"Bōttoshite Miyou" ((ボーッとしてみよう; "Let's Do It"))		Moritaka	Moritaka	3:48
15.	"Here Comes the Sun"	George Harrison	Harrison	Moritaka	3:09
Total length:					57:33

== Personnel ==
- Chisato Moritaka – vocals, drums (all tracks), rhythm guitar (2), recorder (13, 15)
- Yuichi Takahashi – guitar, keyboards, backing vocals (1–7, 9–10, 12–15)
- Hideo Saitō – guitar, bass, horns, tambourine, backing vocals (8)
- Yasuaki Maejima – Fender Rhodes (1–3, 11, 12), piano (4, 6, 8, 12), keyboards (7), percussion (7), organ (8)
- Shin Hashimoto – piano (1, 4–5, 9–10, 13–14), taishōgoto (10, 14), keyboards (13–15), guitar (13–14)
- Yukio Seto – bass (1–2, 4–6, 10, 13–15), guitar (2–4, 7, 11–12, 14), wind chime (11)
- Masafumi Yokoyama – bass (3, 12)
- Teruo Moritaka – bass (11)
- Henderson – backing vocals (5)
- Takahisa Yuzawa – backing vocals (10)

== Charts ==
Chart (1996)	Peak position
Japanese Albums (Oricon)	3

== Certification ==
Region	Certification	Certified units/sales
Japan (RIAJ)	Platinum	400,000^{^}
^{^} Shipments figures based on certification alone.
