= Super Girls (Japanese group) =

Japanese idol girl group

- Origin: Tokyo, Japan
- Genres: J-pop; teen pop; bubblegum pop
- Years active: 2010–present
- Label: Idol Street
- Members: Yuu Kadobayashi; Nanami Takeuchi; Ayaka Kamata; Ayana Kashiwa; Kaho Kawamura; Honoka Sakurai; Near Shinmori; Rune Ninomiya; Moyuho Hamada
- Past members: Eri Akita; Kaede Kanō; Saori Yasaka; Aya Gotō; Rino Katsuta; Reira Arai; Ami Maeshima; Sakurako Kidoguchi; Runa Ozawa; Mirei Tanaka; Rika Shimura; Hikaru Watanabe; Rina Miyazaki; Ruka Mizote; Nana Asakawa; Risa Uchimura; Hotaru Ishibashi; Chika Ishimaru; Koume Watanabe; Aika Matsumoto; Mayuko Inoue; Shiori Nagao; Yuuki Kanazawa; Nazuna Higuchi; Yumeri Abe; Honoka Hagita; Karen Habuchi; Kana Sakabayashi; Cocona Tanaka
- Website: supergirls.jp

Super Girls (Japanese: スーパーガールズ, Hepburn: Sūpā Gāruzu; stylized as SUPER☆GiRLS), also known as Supaga (スパガ), is a nine-member Japanese idol group formed by Avex Trax in 2010.

== History ==
Avex held public auditions for members of the new group in June 2010, from which twelve finalists were selected out of 7,000 participants. By February 2010, about 1,000 people advanced to the second round, and a final round was held in June. The results of the audition were subject to controversy because of a lottery system used to select two of the members.

Super Girls made their stage debut on 7 August 2010, at the A-Nation event. The first live performance of the 11-member idol group was held at Shiodome-AX in Tokyo, and the group released their first album, Chōzetsu Shōjo (超絶少女), on 22 December 2010. The group held their first live concert on 23 October at Harajuku Astro Hall in Tokyo.

Two more singles followed in 2011, "Max! Otomegokoro/Happy Go Lucky!" and "Joshiryoku Paradise". At the end of the year, they were nominated for the Japan Record Award for Best New Artist but lost to another girl group, Fairies.

On 1 February 2012, the group released their second album, Everybody Jump!!. Eri Akita graduated on 5 February, becoming the first member to leave the group. They released three more singles in 2012, "1,000,000 Smile", "Puri Puri Summer Kiss", and "Red Passion".

Kaede Kanō retired from the group on 16 January 2013. The group released their third album, "Celebration" on 20 February 2013, and held the 3rd anniversary live concert on 11 June 2013, at Nippon Budokan. They released four more singles in 2013, "Everlasting Summer High Touch", "Younger Boy", "Sentimental Journey", and "Jin Jin Jingle Bell".

The ninth single "Sky-Colored Miracle" released on 12 February 2014. On 23 February, the group's first leader Saori Yasaka graduated and Rika Shimura become a second leader. Nana Asakawa, Risa Uchimura, and Koume Watanabe joined the group on the same day. Two more singles were released in 2014, "The Flower Road!! Ambitious", and "Ahhahha!: Music of Transcending Laughs".

On 18 February 2015, the group released their 18th single "Sparking Revolution". Aya Goto graduated from the group on 31 March 2015. Between July and September, they held the free concert tour "Idol Street 5th Anniversary: Trip cutting across Japan". They released one more single in August 2015, "Come Go Do It".

On 9 March 2016, the group released their fourth album Super Castle. Rino Katsuta and Reira Arai graduated from the group on 25 June 2016. Sakurako Kidoguchi, Hotaru Ishibashi, Runa Ozawa, Yumeri Abe, and Shiori Nagao joined the group on the same day, and the leader of the group was changed to Ami Maeshima. Two singles were released in 2016, "Love Summer!!!" and "Love Sparkling Application!!!".

Ami Maeshima graduated from the group on 31 March 2017. The leader changed to Ruka Mizote, which reported at the 7th Anniversary Live concert on 17 June 2017. The 16th single "Sweet Smile" released on 26 April 2016. Sakurako Kidoguchi graduated from the group on 30 September 2016, after the hiatus period since 17 April. The single "A Cinderella Story of Sweat and Tears" was released in November 2016.

Runa Ozawa graduated from the group on 31 January 2017, Mirei Tanaka graduated on 31 March. The group released 18th single "Sparklingly Sunshine" on 2 May 2017, the last release before Rika Shimura graduated on 20 May. The public auditions "Super Girls Super Audition!!!!" began on 1 July 2018, to select the new members.

The 19th single "Bubbling Squash!" was released in August, followed by the 20th single "The Selfish Girls Road" in November.

On 19 December 2018, their 8th anniversary live concert was held at Shibuya O-East. The new members Yuuki Kanazawa, Chika Ishimaru, Kana Sakabayashi, Mayuko Inoue, Yuu Kadobayashi, Nazuna Higuchi, and Aika Matsumoto joined the group. Koume Watanabe became the 5th leader.

On 11 January 2019, Hikaru Watanabe, Rina Miyazaki, Ruka Mizote, Nana Asakawa, and Risa Uchimura graduated from the group at the live concert. Three singles released in 2020, "CongraCHUlations!!!", "Summer Vacation", and "Cinderella of Unrequited Love". The fifth album "Chōzetsu Gakuen: Tokimeki High Range!!!" was released on 25 December 2019. Hotaru Ishibashi graduated from the group on 31 December 2019.

On 18 March 2020, the 24th single "Forgotten Cherry Blossoms" was released. The tenth anniversary live concert planned for 11 June 2020, was canceled due to COVID-19. The 25th single "I Want To Believe In Tomorrow" was released on 5 August 2020, and the album Chōzetsu Shōjo Complete 2010–2020 was released on 23 December 2020. Chika Ishimaru graduated from the group on 31 December 2020.

Super Girls released their 25th single "Hajimari Yell" on 21 April 2021, the group's first single without Chika Ishimaru.

On 12 June, Watanabe Koume and Aika Matsumoto graduated from the group and three new members were introduced: Honoka Hagita, Nanami Takeuchi, and Cocona Tanaka. It was also announced that Yumeri became the sixth leader of Super Girls. They released their 26th single "Welcome Natsuzora Peace!!!!!" on 25 August. Mayuko Inoue graduated from the group after her hiatus period on 30 30 December 2021.

On 11 June, Shiori Nagao and Yuuki Kanazawa announced that they would graduate from Super Girls and Idol Street on 31 December 2022. On 10 October, Nazuna Higuchi announced that they would graduate from Super Girls and Idol Street on 31 December 2022. Which was later postponed to 10 February 2023, because of the COVID-19 pandemic. On 12 June, Yumeri Abe announced she would take a hiatus due to heath problems. She later recovered on 23 July and restarted activities.

Super Girls released their 27th single "Summer Lemon" on 6 July 2022.

On 25 July, Nanami Takeuchi announced she would take a hiatus from 21 August 2022 to 1 March 2023 in order to concentrate on her studies when she takes the university entrance exam.

On 29 January 2023, during the Super Girls 12th Anniversary Concert, five new members were introduced: Ayaka Kamata, Ayana Kashiwa, Kaho Kawamura, Honoka Sakurai and Karen Habuchi. Shiori Nagao, Yuuki Kanazawa, and Nazuna Higuchi graduated from the group on 15 February 2023.

On 11 February, it was announced that their digital single "Aoi Hono!!!!!!" would be released on 26 April and their 29th single Ribbon would be released on 12 July, which was the debut of the new line-up.

On 1 March, Nanami Takeuchi restarted her activities with the group.

On 10 June, it is announced that Yumeri Abe would be graduating on 29 December 2023.

On 3 August, It was revealed that Honoka Hagita would be going on hiatus and halt all idol activities due to poor physical conditions. She would be absent from all Super Girls concerts and activities until she recovers.

On 25 September, It was revealed that Kana Sakabayashi would be going on hiatus and halt all idol activities due to her being sick since last month and refraining from some activities due to her illness. Since she is still sick, She would be absent from all Super Girls concerts and activities until she recovers.

On 20 December, Super Girls released their 30th single Heart Diamond. This is the last single to feature Yumeri Abe.

At the Super Girls 13th anniversary concert on 29 December 2023, it was announced that after Yumeri Abe graduated from the group on 31 December 2023, Nanami Takeuchi became the new leader and Yuu Kadobayashi became the stage leader.

On 29 February 2024, Honoka Hagita graduated from the group after her hiatus period. On 19 March, It was announced that Kana Sakabayashi would slowly resume activities after her hiatus. On 17 July, Super Girls released their 31st single "Tobikiri Dare yori Natsuppoi Koto". On 1 October, it was announced that Hinata Sakurai had injured her knee and would be on hiatus until she recovers. On 28 October, it was announced that Hinata Sakurai would resume activities after her recovery.

On 31 December, it was announced that Karen Habuchi has been suspended from all activities and withdrew from Super Girls due to a violation of her exclusive contract. As a result, Habuchi had to leave the group and her exclusive contract was terminated.

On January 20 2025, they released their digital single "Motto Motto♡" for download.

On April 15, they released their digital single "Re Star☆T!!!!!!" for download.

On June 12, they released their digital single "Kawaii dakeja irarenai" for download.

On August 30, they released their digital single "Summer Silent Timer" for download.

On December 22, they released their digital single "Happy Turn! ~Dondengaeshi wa Totsuzen ni~" for download.

On January 14, it was announced that Kana Sakabayashi and Cocona Tanaka would be graduating from the group, their graduation ceremony will take place at the group's 16th anniversary concert scheduled to be held to be held on July 12.

On July 1, they released their digital single "Sunset Kiss" for download.

On September 4, it was announced that Moyuho Hamada joined the group as a Chapter 7 Member.

On September 5, it was announced that Rune Ninomiya joined the group as a Chapter 7 Member.

On September 6, it was announced that Near Shinmori joined the group as a Chapter 7 Member.

On October 1, they released their 33rd single "Nanairo no Panorama!!!!!!!".

== Members ==
=== Current members ===
Given Name	Nickname	Birthdate	Age	Origin	Chouzetsu Color	Chapter Member	Joined Date	Notes
Yuu Kadobayashi (門林 有羽)	Yuchan (ゆうちゃん / Yuchan)	28 October 1998	27	Osaka	Aqua Blue (R160 G216 B239)	Chapter 4 Member	19 December 2018	Stage Leader, Oldest
Nanami Takeuchi (竹内 ななみ)	Nanamin (ななみん / Nanamin)	2 October 2004	21	Hyōgo	Lovely Red (R225 G054 B012)	Chapter 5 Member	12 June 2021	Main Leader, Former Avex Management Model
Ayaka Kamata (鎌田 彩樺)	Ayachi (あやち / Ayachi)	29 April 2003	23	Hiroshima	Sapphire Navy (R006 G036 B122)	Chapter 6 Member	29 January 2023	Former Loafers High!! member and LesPros Entertainment member
Ayana Kashiwa (柏 綾菜)	Kashiwa-chan (柏ちゃん / Kashiwa-chan), Ayanan (あやなん / Ayanan)	20 July 2005	21	Saitama	Purely Purple (R146 G059 B145)	Chapter 6 Member	29 January 2023	Former Si☆Stella member & Si☆4 member
Kaho Kawamura (河村 果歩)	Kahotchi (かほっち / Kahocchi)	17 June 2007	19	Gifu	Pearly White (R255 G250 B250)	Chapter 6 Member	29 January 2023	Former Oha Girl in Oha Suta & Former Avex Management New Face
Honoka Sakurai (櫻井 穂夏)	Honorin (ほのりん / Honorin)	6 July 2007	19	Fukagawa, Hokkaido	Snow Green (R093 G181 B166)	Chapter 6 Member	29 January 2023	Former Avex Management Trainee
Near Shinmori (新森 ニ愛)	Nearnya (にあにゃ / Nearnya)	30 November 2009	16	Osaka	Kirameki Yellow (R255, G243, B065)	Chapter 7 Member	13 September 2026	
Rune Ninomiya (二宮 伶寧)	Ru-chan (るーちゃん / Ru-chan)	16 September 2010	16	Kanagawa	Bloom Clover (R182, G213, B094)	Chapter 7 Member	13 September 2026	Former scholarship student at Zest Music School Nagoya Sakae branch
Moyuho Hamada (浜田 萌帆)	Moyu-chan (もゆちゃん / Moyu-chan)	29 October 2010	15	Aichi	Milky Pink (R233, G082, B149)	Chapter 7 Member	13 September 2026	Youngest

=== Former members ===
- Eri Akita (秋田 恵里)
- Kaede Kanō (稼農 楓)
- Saori Yasaka (八坂 沙織)
- Aya Gotō (後藤 彩)
- Rino Katsuta (勝田 梨乃)
- Reira Arai (荒井 玲良)
- Ami Maeshima (前島 亜美)
- Sakurako Kidoguchi (木戸口 桜子)
- Runa Ozawa (尾澤 ルナ)
- Mirei Tanaka (田中 美麗)
- Rika Shimura (志村 理佳)
- Hikaru Watanabe (渡邉 ひかる)
- Rina Miyazaki (宮﨑 理奈)
- Ruka Mizote (溝手 るか)
- Nana Asakawa (浅川 梨奈)
- Risa Uchimura (内村 莉彩)
- Hotaru Ishibashi (石橋 蛍)
- Chika Ishimaru (石丸 千賀)
- Koume Watanabe (渡邉 幸愛)
- Aika Matsumoto (松本 愛花)
- Mayuko Inoue (井上 真由子)
- Shiori Nagao (長尾 しおり)
- Yuuki Kanazawa (金澤 有希)
- Nazuna Higuchi (樋口 なづな)
- Yumeri Abe (阿部 夢梨)
- Honoka Hagita (萩田 帆風)
- Karen Habuchi (羽渕 花恋)
- Kana Sakabayashi (坂林 佳奈)
- Cocona Tanaka (田中 想)

== Discography ==
=== Albums ===
Title	Release date	Chart position		Sales (Oricon)	
Title	Release date	Oricon Albums Chart	Billboard Japan Top Albums	First week	Total
Chōzetsu Shōjo (超絶少女)	22 December 2010	32	55	4,905	7,382
EveryBody Jump!!	1 February 2012	5	9	24,474	29,543
Celebration	20 February 2013	3	12	25,928	28,425
Super Castle	3 March 2016	3	2	11,479	13,268
Chōzetsu☆Gakuen ~Tokimeki High Range!!!~ (超絶☆学園~ときめきHighレンジ!!!~)	25 December 2019	20	21	4,719	4,719
Chōzetsu Shōjo☆COMPLETE 2010～2020 (超絶少女☆COMPLETE 2010～2020)	23 December 2020	32	55	4,905	7,382
Chōzetsu☆HAPPY ～Minnani Sachiare!!!!!〜 (超絶☆HAPPY 〜ミンナニサチアレ!!!!!〜)	21 December 2022	10	10	10,443	

=== Singles ===
Title	Release date	Chart position		Sales (Oricon)		Certification	Notes
Title	Release date	Oricon Weekly Singles Chart	Billboard Japan Hot 100	First week	Total	Certification	Notes
"Good Luck Youth" (がんばって 青春, Ganbatte Seishun)	20 April 2011	5	49	13,552	16,602	-	
"MAX! Girl's Heart / Happy Go Lucky! Going by Happy☆Lucky" (MAX! 乙女心 / Happy Go Lucky!～ハピ☆ラキでゴー!～, "MAX! Otomegokoro / Happy Go Lucky! Hapi ☆ Raki de Go!")	15 June 2011	5	25	29,027	39,964	-	
"Girls' Power Paradise" (女子力←パラダイス, Joshiryoku←Paradise)	5 October 2011	2	5	48,917	57,160	-	Last single with Eri Akita
"1,000,000 ☆ Smile" (1,000,000☆スマイル)	18 April 2012	5	23	36,725	43,230	-	
"Puri Puri♥SUMMER Kiss" (プリプリ♥SUMMERキッス, PuriPuri♥SUMMER Kissu)	4 July 2012	4	10	71,736	92,599	Gold	
"Red Passion" (赤い情熱, Akai Jōnetsu)	24 October 2012	2	9	53,607	58,521	-	Last single with Kaede Kano
"Everlasting Summer High Touch" (常夏ハイタッチ, Tokonatsu Hai Tatchi)	12 June 2013	3	18	75,937	87,110	Gold	
"Younger Boy" (年下の男の子; Toshishita no Otokonoko)	4 December 2013	11	31	11,640	12,136	-	Released as Candy Macchiato from SUPER☆GiRLS
"Sentimental Journey" (センチメンタル・ジャーニー)	4 December 2013	12	34	11,046	11,538	-	Released as Maeshima Ami from SUPER☆GiRLS
"Jin Jin Jingle Bell" (ジン ジン ジングルベル)	4 December 2013	10	33	11,666	12,137	-	Released as Twinkle Veil from SUPER☆GiRLS; Last single with Saori Yasaka
"Sky-Colored Miracle" (空色のキセキ, Sorairo no Kiseki)	12 February 2014	2	30	39,604	40,699	-	
"The Flower Road!! A~mbitious" (花道!!ア～ンビシャス, Hanamichi!! A~mbitious)	14 May 2014	3	35	33,585	34,750	-	First single with Chapter Two members
"Ahhahha! ~Music of Transcending Laughs~" (アッハッハ! ～超絶爆笑音頭～, "Ahhahha! ~Chouzetsu Bakushou Ondo~")	13 August 2014	4	86	41,385	51,043	-	
"Sparking Revolution" (ギラギラRevolution)	18 February 2015	3	89	50,740	51,705	-	Last single with Aya Goto
"Come Go♪ Do It♪" (イッチャって♪ ヤッチャって♪)	19 August 2015	5	-	74,283	76,498	Gold	Last single with Reira Arai and Rino Katsuta
"Love Summer!!!" (ラブサマ!!!, Rabusama!!!)	31 August 2016	2	5	55,134	58,091	Gold	First single with Ami Maeshima as leader.; First single with Chapter Three members
"Love☆Sparkling Application!!!" (恋☆煌メケーション!!!,, Koi☆Kiramekeeshon)	21 December 2016	7	9	24,868	25,245	-	Last single with Ami Maeshima
"Sweet☆Smile" (スイート☆スマイル)	17 April 2017	11	31	10,585	11,148	-	First single with Ruka Mizote as leader; Last single with Sakurako Kidoguchi
"A Cinderella Story of Sweat and Tears" (汗と涙のシンデレラストーリー, Ase to Namida No Cinderella Story)	29 November 2017	27	37	4,138	-	-	Last single with Runa Ozawa and Mirei Tanaka
"Sparklingly☆Sunshine" (キラキラ☆Sunshine)	2 May 2018	14	-	4,279	-	-	Last single with Rika Shimura
"Bubbling Squash!" (ばぶりんスカッシュ!, Baburin Sukasshu!)	15 August 2018	12	62	7,235	-	-	
"The Selfish GiRLS ROAD" (わがまま GiRLS ROAD)	14 November 2018	8	57	16,056	17,443	-	Last single with Hikaru Watanabe, Rina Miyazaki, Ruka Mizote, Nana Asakawa and Risa Uchimura
"CongraCHUlations!!!" (コングラCHUレーション!!!!, CongraCHUrations!!!)	27 February 2019	6	17	21,775	21,775	-	First single with Koume Watanabe as leader; First single with Chapter Four members
"Summer★Vacation" (ナツカレ★バケーション)	12 June 2019	6	32	16,453	18,144	-	
"Cinderella of Unrequited Love" (片想いのシンデレラ, Kataomoi no Cinderella)	18 September 2019	12	67	8,615	8,615	-	Last single with Hotaru Ishibashi
"Forgotten Cherry Blossoms" (忘れ桜, Wasurezakura)	18 March 2020	13	26	6,685	-	-	
"I Want To Believe In Tomorrow" (明日を信じてみたいって思えるよ, Ashita wo Shinjite Mitaitte Omoeru yo)	5 August 2020	7	43	7,512	8,876	-	Yuu Kadobayashi doesn't appear in that single due to hiatus; Last single with Chika Ishimaru
"Beginning Yell" (はじまりエール, Hajimari Yell)	21 April 2021	11	54	6,190	-	-	Last single with Koume Watanabe and Aika Matsumoto
"WELCOME☆Summer Sky Peace!!!!!" (WELCOME☆夏空ピース!!!!!, WELCOME☆Natsuzora Peace!!!!!)	25 August 2021	21	22	3,018	-	-	First single with Yumeri Abe as leader; First single with Chapter Five members; Last single with Mayuko Inoue
"Summer Lemon"	6 July 2022	7	7	7,265	-	-	Last single with Shiori Nagao, Yuuki Kanazawa and Nazuna Higuchi
"Ribbon" (リボン, Ribbon)	12 July 2023	6	6	13,745	13,745	-	First single with Chapter Six members; Last single with Honoka Hagita
"Heart Diamond"	20 December 2023	5	5	11,733	12.234	-	Kana Sakabayashi and Honoka Hagita both don't appear in that single due to hiatus; Last single with Yumeri Abe
"Something Much More Summery Than Anyone Else" (とびきりだれより夏っぽいこと, Tobikiri Dare yori Natsuppoi Koto)	17 July 2024	9	9	7,027	8,239	-	Last single with Karen Habuchi
"Sunset Kiss"	1 July 2026	5	45	11,653		-	Last single with Kana Sakabayashi and Cocona Tanaka
"A seven-colored panorama!!!!!!!" (七色のパノラマ!!!!!!!, Nanairo no Panorama!!!!!!!)	1 October 2026					-	First single with Chapter Seven members

=== Music Cards・Digital Single ===
Title	Release date	Notes
White Melody	17 July 2019	–
POP!! POP!! POP!!	17 July 2019	–
Passionate RUNNER (情熱RUNNER, Jounetsu RUNNER)	21 August 2019	–
RAINBOW-Colored SKY (NIJI色SKY, NIJI iro SKY)	21 August 2019	–
Cinderella of Unrequited Love (片想いのシンデレラ, Kataomoi no Cinderella)	18 September 2019	–
Emotion Canvas (感情キャンバス, Kanjo Canvas)	23 October 2019	–
Please stay with me	23 October 2019	–
Youth Sparkling (青春キラリ, Seishun Kirari)	20 November 2019	Hotaru Ishibashi doesn't appear in that single due to hiatus
Sun Drop (太陽の雫, Taiyō no Shizuku)	20 November 2019	Hotaru Ishibashi doesn't appear in that single due to hiatus
Crush High Range!!! (ときめきHighレンジ!!!, Tokimeki High Range!!!)	5 December 2019	–
Merry X'mas in the night sky (夜空にMerry X'mas, Yozora ni Merry X'mas)	5 December 2019	Hotaru Ishibashi doesn't appear in that single due to hiatus
Good Luck Youth 2022 (がんばって 青春 2022, Ganbatte Seishun 2022)	20 April 2022	–
Blue Flame!!!!!! (蒼い炎!!!!!!, Aoi Honoo!!!!!!)	26 April 2023	–
Motto Motto♡ (もっともっと♡, Motto Motto♡)	20 January 2025	–
Re Star☆T!!!!!!	15 April 2025	–
It's not enough to just be cute (可愛いだけじゃいられない, Kawaii dakeja irarenai)	16 June 2025	–
Summer Silent Timer (サマーサイレント・タイマー, Summer Silent Timer)	30 August 2025	–
Happy Turn! ~The plot twist comes suddenly~ (ハッピー・ターン！～ドンデン返しは突然に～, Happy Turn! ~Donden Gaeshi wa Totsuzen ni~)	22 December 2025	–

=== DVDs ===
Title	Release date	Contents
First concert: Chōzetsu Shōjo ga Tomannai! (ファーストコンサート〜超絶少女が止まンないっ!〜)	28 September 2011	Live performance on 21 December 2010, at Shibuya-AX
Super Girls Chōzetsu Shōjo 2012 Memorial at Nihon Seinenkan (SUPER☆GiRLS 超絶少女2012 メモリアル at 日本青年館)	28 March 2012	Live performance on 5 February 2012, at Nippon Seinen-kan Hall
Super Girls Seitan 2 Shūnen Kinen SP & Idol Street Carnival 2012 (SUPER☆GiRLS生誕2周年記念SP & アイドルストリートカーニバル2012)	19 September 2012	Live performance on 12 June 2012, at Nakano Sun Plaza
Chōzetsu Gakuen: Mirai e no Step (超絶☆学園～未来へのSTEP～)	12 December 2012	Short films shown on 18 August 2012, at Odaiba Cinema Mediage in Tokyo
Chōzetsu Bus Tour: Idol Street Dai-undōkai in Yamanashi (超絶バスツアー ～アイドルストリート大運動会 in 山梨～)	9 January 2013	Documentary film of event held on 23 November 2012, in Yamanashi
Super Girls no Chōzetsu Adventure! (SUPER☆GiRLSの超絶アドベンチャー！)	20 March 2013	TV programs

== Awards ==
=== Japan Record Awards ===
The Japan Record Awards is a music awards show held annually by the Japan Composer's Association.

Year	Nominee / work	Award	Result
2011	Super Girls (group)	New Artist	Won
2011	Super Girls (group)	Best New Artist	Nominated
