= Gakidama =

1985 Japanese horror film

- VHS cover art
- Kanji: 餓鬼魂
- Directed by: Masayoshi Sukita
- Screenplay by: Atsushi Yamatoya
- Based on: Gakidama by Baku Yumemakara
- Produced by: Tomohiko Hamada
- Starring: Kazuyo Matsui; Kyōzō Nagatsuka; Ichirō Ogura; Yōsuke Saitō
- Cinematography: Motomu Shimada
- Edited by: Yasuo Sato
- Music by: Akira Inoue
- Production company: Tsuburaya Productions
- Release date: 27 December 1985 (Japan)
- Running time: 54 minutes
- Country: Japan
- Language: Japanese

Gakidama (Japanese: 餓鬼魂;, lit. ''Baby Goblin''), also known as The Demon Within and The Tasty Flesh, is a Japanese horror film based on the novel of the same name by Baku Yumemakara. The 54-minute creature feature was directed by Masayoshi Sukita and released on 27 December 1985. A combination of Japanese folklore and contemporary horror standards, the story concerns a flesh-eating hitodama (a gakidama) and its attacks on a journalist and those near him. Special effects and make-up were handled by Shinichi Wakasa, also known for his work on various Godzilla films.

== Cast ==
- Kazuyo Matsui as Michiko Morioka
- Kyōzō Nagatsuka as Takao Morioka
- Ichirō Ogura as Kitayan
- Yōsuke Saitō as Mystery Man

== Home media ==
The film was released on DVD by Geneon Entertainment.
