= Mikadroid =

- Film poster
- Directed by: Tomoo Haraguchi
- Written by: Tomoo Haraguchi; Junki Takegami
- Produced by: Haruo Sai; Akira Tsuburaya; Kazumasa Shimoizaka; Kenji Nagai
- Starring: Yoriko Dōguchi; Tomonori Yoshida; Hiroshi Atsumi
- Cinematography: Yousuke Mamiya
- Edited by: Ryuichi Takano
- Music by: Kenji Kawai
- Production companies: Toho; Tohokushinsha; Tsuburaya Video
- Distributed by: Toho Video
- Release date: 8 November 1991 (Japan)
- Running time: 73 minutes
- Country: Japan
- Languages: Japanese; English
- Budget: ¥50 million

Mikadroid (Japanese: ミカドロイド, Hepburn: Mikadoroido), also known as Mikadroid: Robokill Beneath Disco Club Layla, is a 1991 Japanese tokusatsu science fiction horror film co-produced by Toho, Tohokushinsha, and Tsuburaya Video, and directed by Tomoo Haraguchi in his directorial debut. Shinji Higuchi contributed to the film's special effects, while Akio Jissoji assisted the production as a supervisor. The film was released to Japanese home video on 8 November 1991.

== Synopsis ==
During World War II, the Japanese military established a secret underground laboratory in Tokyo. Three Olympic-level athletes were selected to undergo a process that would turn them into Jinra-go, superhuman armored soldiers. By March 1945, one of the soldiers had been completely transformed into the half-man/half-machine ultimate soldier called Mikadroid. But American B-29s firebomb the city and, while the two super soldiers manage to escape, Mikadroid and the lab are apparently destroyed. 45 years pass, Tokyo is rebuilt, and old secrets are forgotten. The site is now home to a complex that includes the Discoclub Layla. The disco's patrons dance late into the night, unaware that a faulty basement generator has reactivated Mikadroid and the cyborg now prowls the basement levels, killing anyone in its path.

== Cast ==
- Yoriko Dōguchi as Saiko
- Tomonori Yoshida as Tomita
- Hiroshi Atsumi as Okazaki
- Takuya Tsuda as Riju
- Kenji Hayami as Kitami
- Masako Takeda as Noriko
- Masatō Ibu as Doctor
- Kiyoshi Kurosawa as Military Police Officer A
- Kaizo Hayashi as Military Police Officer B
- Makoto Tezuka as Military Police Officer C (credited as Macoto Tezuka)
- Sandayū Dokumamushi as Security Guard
- Hurricane Ryu as Jinra
- Kenichirou Sagaki as Phone (voice only)
- Masao Fukazawa (credited as "Little Man" Machan)
- Kimihide Mitsumasu
- Leo Morimoto

== Production ==
Originally, the project was titled Mikado Zombie and revolved around an undead Imperial Japanese soldier. Director Haraguchi changed the premise to be about a killer cyborg instead, in the wake of Tsutomu Miyazaki's killing spree and the controversy surrounding his large collection of horror films.

Mikadroid was shot on 16 mm film.

This film marks the first time that Shinji Higuchi was credited as a special effects director. In an interview, Higuchi recalled: "When the director, Mr. Tomoo Haraguchi, asked me to do special effects, I asked him to let me call myself a 'special effects director' as a condition. 'Special effects director' was what Mr. Eiji Tsuburaya called himself. [...] After thinking about a way to call myself a 'director,' I decided on 'special effects director,' a title that no one had taken for a long time. At the time, it was coming from a lighthearted place, and I thought I could just call myself what I wanted. No one has ever complained."

== Release ==
Toho Video released Mikadroid straight to VHS on 8 November 1991. It was the first direct-to-video production on the company's short-lived "Toho Cinepack" label. Toho later released a DVD of the film on 11 November 2002.

Discotek Media released a Region 1 DVD with English subtitles in 2006.
