= Kokon Tozai =

Studio album by Chisato Moritaka
- Released: October 17, 1990
- Recorded: 1990
- Studio: Sunrise
- Length: 63:00
- Language: Japanese
- Label: Warner Pioneer
- Producers: Yukio Seto; Hideo Saitō

Chisato Moritaka chronology
Moritaka Land (1989)	Kokon Tozai (1990)	The Moritaka (1991)

Singles from Kokon Tozai
- 1. "Ame" Released: September 10, 1990

Alternative cover
- Limited edition inner cover

Kokon Tozai (古今東西, Kokon Tōzai; All Times and Places) is the fifth studio album by Japanese singer/songwriter Chisato Moritaka, released on October 17, 1990, by Warner Pioneer. A limited edition release included a 32-page photo book.

Kokon Tozai became Moritaka's first and only album to hit No. 1 on Oricon's albums chart and sold over 354,000 copies. It also placed at No. 29 on Oricon's 1990 year-ending albums chart. In addition, it was certified Gold by the RIAJ.

== Track listing ==
All lyrics are written by Chisato Moritaka, except where indicated; all music is composed and arranged by Hideo Saitō, except where indicated.

No.	Title	Lyrics	Music	Arrangement	Length
1.	"Prologue" (Purorōgu (プロローグ))				0:26
2.	"Oni Taiji" ((鬼たいじ; "Demon Hunting"))				3:23
3.	"The Busters Blues" (Za Basutāzu Burūsu (ザ・バスターズ・ブルース))				3:25
4.	"Interlude No. 5"				0:06
5.	"Aru OL no Seishun ~ A-ko no Baai ~ (Moritaka Connection)" (Aru Ō Ēru no Seishun ~ Ē-ko no Baai ~ (Moritaka Konekushon) (あるOLの青春～A子の場合～ (森高コネクション); "A Certain Young Office Lady ~ In the Case of Child A ~ (Moritaka Connection)"))				4:05
6.	"Oye Cómo Va"	Tito Puente	Puente		3:56
7.	"Ame (Album Version)" (Ame (Arubamu Vājon) (雨 (アルバム・ヴァージョン); "Rain (Album Version)"))		Seiji Matsuura		5:18
8.	"Daibōken" ((大冒険; "Great Adventure"))				4:44
9.	"Hong Kong" ((香港))				4:36
10.	"Hare" ((晴れ; "Sunny"))		Yuichi Takahashi	Takahashi	2:52
11.	"Misaki" ((岬; "Cape"))				5:07
12.	"Funky Monkey Baby" (Fankī Monkī Beibī (ファンキー・モンキー・ベイビー))	George Ōkura	Eikichi Yazawa		2:35
13.	"Tsukiyo no Kōkai" ((月夜の航海; "Moonlit Voyage"))		Takahashi	Takahashi	4:06
14.	"Tomodachi" ((友達; "Friend"))				4:35
15.	"Kono Machi" ((この街; "This Town"))				4:35
16.	"Teriyaki Burger" (Teriyaki Bāgā (テリヤキ・バーガー))				4:33
17.	"Epilogue" (Epirōgu (エピローグ))				1:27
18.	"Uchi ni Kagitte Sonna Koto wa Nai Hazu" ((うちにかぎってそんなことはないはず; "That Shouldn't Be the Case"))		Masataro Naoe	Carnation	3:10
Total length:					63:00

== Personnel ==
- Chisato Moritaka – vocals, piano (3)
- Hideo Saitō – all instruments, programming, backing vocals (all tracks except where indicated)
- Yuichi Takahashi – all instruments, backing vocals (10, 13)
- Yukio Seto – guitar (3, 13)
- Seiji Matsuura – backing vocals (6–8, 10, 13, 15, 16), guitar (13)
- Carnation (18)

- Masataro Naoe – guitar
- Osamu Toba – guitar
- Yuji Mada – bass
- Yuichi Tanaya – keyboards, backing vocals
- Hiroshi Yabe – drums

== Charts ==
Chart (1990)	Peak position
Japanese Albums (Oricon)	1

== Certification ==
Region	Certification	Certified units/sales
Japan (RIAJ)	Gold	200,000^{^}
^{^} Shipments figures based on certification alone.

== Cover versions ==
- W covered "Uchi ni Kagitte Sonna Koto wa Nai Hazu" in their 2019 EP Choi Waru Devil.

== See also ==
- 1990 in Japanese music
