= Moritaka Tofu =

Remix album by Chisato Moritaka with Tofubeats
- Released: December 17, 2014
- Language: Japanese
- Label: Warner Music Japan
- Producer: Tofubeats

Singles from Moritaka Tofu
- 1. "Don't Stop the Music" Released: November 13, 2013

Chisato Moritaka chronology
YouTube Public Recording & Live at Yokohama Blitz (2013)	Chisato Moritaka with Tofubeats: Moritaka Tofu (2014)	UHQCD The First Best Selection '87~'92 (2015)

Tofubeats chronology
First Album (2014)	Chisato Moritaka with Tofubeats: Moritaka Tofu (2014)	Positive (2015)

Moritaka Tofu (森高豆腐) is a remix album by Japanese singer-songwriter Chisato Moritaka and DJ Tofubeats, released on December 17, 2014, by Warner Music Japan. The album features remixes of Moritaka's hit songs and new tracks composed by Tofubeats. To promote the album, the duo hosted the "Don't Stop The Music" First Album "Special Night @ WOMB" show in Shibuya on its release date.

== Track listing ==
All lyrics are written by Chisato Moritaka, except where indicated; all music is arranged by Tofubeats.

No.	Title	Lyrics	Music	Length
1.	"Te wo Tatakō (Tofubeats edit)" ((手をたたこう; "Clap Your Hands"))		Moritaka
2.	"La La Sunshine (Tofubeats edit)" ((ララサンシャイン; Ra Ra Sanshain))		Hiromasa Ijichi
3.	"Kibun Sōkai (Tofubeats remix)" ((気分爽快; "Refreshing"))		Kenichi Kurosawa
4.	"Benkyō no Uta (Tofubeats Maji-Benkyo remix)" ((勉強のうた; "Study Song"))		Hideo Saitō
5.	"Disco no Kamisama" ((ディスコの神様; "Disco God"))	Tofubeats	Tofubeats
6.	"Watashi ga Obasan ni Natte mo 2014" ((私がオバさんになっても2014; "Even if I Become an Old Lady 2014"))		Saitō
7.	"Stress (Tofubeats remix)" (Sutoresu (ストレス))		Saitō
8.	"Jin Jin Jingle Bell (Tofubeats remix)" (Jin Jin Jinguru Beru (ジンジンジングルベル))		Moritaka
9.	"Suisei" ((水星; "Mercury"))	Tofubeats	Tofubeats
10.	"Asa ga Kurumade Owaru Koto no Nai Dance wo" ((朝が来るまで終わることのないダンスを; "The Dance That Never Ends Until the Morning"))	Tofubeats	Tofubeats
11.	"Don't Stop the Music"	Tofubeats	Tofubeats
