= The Moritaka =

Remix album by Chisato Moritaka
- Released: July 10, 1991
- Recorded: 1991
- Length: 70:42
- Language: Japanese
- Label: Warner Pioneer
- Producer: Yukio Seto; Hideo Saitō

Chisato Moritaka chronology
Kokon Tozai (1991)	The Moritaka (1991)	Rock Alive (1992)

Singles from The Moritaka
- 1. "Michi/Seishun" Released: January 25, 1990; 2. "Kusai Mono ni wa Futa wo Shiro!!" Released: May 25, 1990; 3. "Benkyō no Uta/Kono Machi" Released: February 10, 1991; 4. "Hachigatsu no Koi" Released: June 25, 1991

The Moritaka (ザ・森高, Za Moritaka) is a remix album by Japanese singer-songwriter Chisato Moritaka, released on July 10, 1991, by Warner Pioneer to coincide with the fifth anniversary of her entertainment career. The album includes two new tracks: "Mijikai Natsu" and "Kanojo", as well as remixes and re-recordings of Moritaka's previous singles. A limited edition release included a 32-page photo book.

The album peaked at No. 2 on Oricon's albums chart and sold over 353,000 copies. It was also certified Platinum by the RIAJ in March 1993.

The Moritaka was reissued on double-LP by Warner Music Japan on November 3, 2017. It is also offered in the limited edition Blu-ray boxed set of The Moritaka Tour 1991.8.22 at Shibuya Public Hall.

== Track listing ==
All lyrics are written by Chisato Moritaka, except where indicated; all music is composed and arranged by Hideo Saitō, except where indicated.

No.	Title	Lyrics	Music	Arrangement	Length
1.	"Mijikai Natsu" ((短い夏; "A Short Summer"))		Kyōhei Tsutsumi		4:54
2.	"Kusai Mono ni wa Futa wo Shiro!! (Motto Kusai Mono Version)" ((臭いものにはフタをしろ！！ (もっと臭いものヴァージョン); "Shut Your Stinking Trap!! (Stinkier Version)"))				2:55
3.	"Daite (Las Vegas Version) (Reproduction)" ((だいて (ラスベガス・ヴァージョン); "Hold Me (Las Vegas Version)"))		Yuichi Takahashi	Takahashi	5:00
4.	"The Benkyō no Uta" ((ザ・勉強の歌; "The Study Song"))				5:52
5.	"Hachigatsu no Koi (Album Version)" ((八月の恋 (アルバム・ヴァージョン); "Love in August (Album Version)"))		Tsutsumi		4:13
6.	"Get Smile (Concert Arrange Version)" ((GET SMILE (コンサート・アレンジ・ヴァージョン)))	Hiromasa Ijichi	Ken Shima	Yasuaki Maejima; Saitō	5:57
7.	"The Nozokanaide" ((ザ・のぞかないで; "The Don't Look"))				6:17
8.	"Ame (Rock Version)" ((雨 (ロック・ヴァージョン); "Rain (Rock Version)"))		Seiji Matsuura		5:48
9.	"Kanojo" ((彼女; "She"))				5:41
10.	"Seishun (The Moritaka Take)" ((青春 (ザ・森高テイク); "Youth" (The Moritaka Take)"))				4:20
11.	"The Mi-ha (The Moritaka Version)" ((ザ・ミーハー (ザ・森高ヴァージョン)))				5:53
12.	"The Stress (The Moritaka Version)" ((ザ・ストレス (ザ・森高ヴァージョン)))				7:35
13.	"Kusai Mono ni wa Futa wo Shiro!! (Ojisan Version)" ((臭いものにはフタをしろ！！ (おじさんヴァージョン); "Shut Your Stinking Trap!! (Old Man Version)"))				3:59
14.	"Kono Machi (The Moritaka Version)" ((この街 (ザ・森高ヴァージョン); "This Town (The Moritaka Version)"))				2:16
Total length:					70:42

== Personnel ==
- Chisato Moritaka – vocals
- Hideo Saitō – all instruments, programming, backing vocals (all tracks except where indicated)
- Yuichi Takahashi – guitar, synthesizer, programming, backing vocals (3)
- Yasuaki Maejima – keyboards, backing vocals (6, 10), piano (13)
- Shin Kono – keyboards, backing vocals (6, 10), organ (13)
- Ken Shima – piano (3)
- Hirokuni Korekata – guitar (3)
- Hiroyoshi Matsuo – guitar (6, 10, 13)
- Ojisan – guitar solo (13)
- Masafumi Yokoyama – bass, backing vocals (6, 10, 13)
- Makoto Yoshihara – drums (6, 10)
- Teruo Goto – tenor saxophone (3)
- Seiji Matsuura – backing vocals (4)

== Charts ==
Chart (1991)	Peak position
Japanese Albums (Oricon)	2

== Certification ==
Region	Certification	Certified units/sales
Japan (RIAJ)	Platinum	400,000^{^}
^{^} Shipments figures based on certification alone.
