= The Twins at St. Clare's (TV series) =

Japanese anime television series

- Japanese: おちゃめなふたご ―クレア学院物語―
- Genre: School story
- Based on: St. Clare's by Enid Blyton
- Written by: Haruya Yamazaki; Michiru Shimada; Takeo Okina
- Directed by: Masaharu Okuwaki
- Music by: Masahiro Kawasaki
- Opening theme: Benkyō no Uta by Chisato Moritaka
- Ending theme: Itsumademo by Chisato Moritaka
- Country of origin: Japan
- Original language: Japanese
- No. of episodes: 26

Production
- Producers: Hibiki Ito (NTV); Yasumichi Osaki (TMS); Masahito Yoshioka
- Editor: Masahira Tsurubuchi
- Production company: Tokyo Movie Shinsha

Original release
- Network: NNS (NTV)
- Release: January 5 – November 2, 1991

The Twins at St. Clare's (おちゃめなふたご ―クレア学院物語―, Ochame na Futago: Kurea Gakuin Monogatari) is a 1991 Japanese anime created by Tokyo Movie Shinsha (now known as TMS Entertainment) and originally broadcast on Nippon TV from January to November 1991. The anime is based on the St. Clare's books by English children's author Enid Blyton.

== Plot ==
Twin sisters Patricia and Isabel O'Sullivan are sent to St. Clare's by their parents, due to their fear that the twins might become negatively influenced.

== Characters ==
- Patricia O'Sullivan (パトリシア・サリバン, Patorishia Sariban)
  - Voice by Noriko Hidaka (Japanese)
- Isabelle O'Sullivan (イザベル・サリバン, Izaberu Sariban)
  - Voice by Eriko Hara (Japanese)
- Sheila Neira (シェイラ・ネイラ, Sheira Neira)
  - Voice by Kae Araki (Japanese)
- Hillary Wentworth (ヒラリー・ウエントワース, Hirarī Uentowāsu)
  - Voice by Sumi Shimamoto (Japanese)
- Jimmy (ジミー, Jimī)
  - Voice by Taiki Matsuno (Japanese)

== Distribution ==
=== Japan ===
The anime was rebroadcast on NHK-BS2 in 1998, on KBS from August 23, 2013, to September 27, 2013, and on Tokyo MX from November 14, 2013, to January 14, 2014.

=== Portugal ===
A Portuguese dub was created and broadcast on RTP2 in 1992, and later on RTP1 in 1994, under the name As Gémeas de Santa Clara.

=== Italy ===
An Italian dub was created by Deneb Film and broadcast on Italia 1 in 1993, under the name Una scuola per cambiare.

=== The Netherlands and Belgium ===
A Dutch dub was created and broadcast on Netherland 3 and Ketnet in 1994, under the name De dolle tweeling.

=== Philippines ===
A Tagalog dub was created and broadcast on ABS-CBN.

=== Germany and Austria ===
A German dub was broadcast on Kinderkanal in Germany from October 17, 1997, to November 24, 1997, under the name Hanni und Nanni. It was also aired on ZDF and ORF 1 in Austria.

=== France ===
A French dub was created by Studio One Take Productions and broadcast on Teletoon in 1997, under the name Les Jumelles de St-Clare.

=== Spain, Catalonia and Latin America ===
A Catalan dub was created and broadcast on K3 and TV3 in 1998, under the name Les Bessones a St. Clare's. Antena 3 broadcast the series in European Spanish, as well as TV Azteca in Mexico (Latin American Spanish/Mexican dub), both titled Las Gemelas de St. Claire.

== Theme songs ==
- Openings
1. "Study Song" (勉強の歌, Benkyō no Uta)
  - Lyricist: Chisato Moritaka / Composer: Hideo Saitō / Singers: Chisato Moritaka
- Endings
1. "Forever and Ever" (いつまでも, Itsumademo)
  - Lyricist: Chisato Moritaka / Composer: Shinji Yasuda / Singers: Chisato Moritaka
