= Ami Maeshima =

Japanese female idol and actress (born 1997)

- 前島 亜美
- Born: 22 November 1997 (age 28); Saitama
- Other name: Amita (あみた)
- Occupations: Japanese idol, voice actress
- Years active: 2010–present
- Agent: Voice Kit
- Height: 164 cm (5 ft 5 in)

Ami Maeshima (前島 亜美, Maeshima Ami; born 22 November 1997, in Saitama Prefecture) is a Japanese idol, actress, and YouTuber. She is best known for being the voice actress of Aya Maruyama from BanG Dream! and as a former member of Super Girls.

== Biography ==
After passing "avex Idol Audition 2010" on 12 June 2010, Maeshima became a member of the Japanese idol group Super Girls. As a member, she was given the nickname "Amita" (あみた) and assigned rose pink as her image color. In 2011, she started taking on solo activities in parallel with the group's activities, releasing exclusive modeling and solo photo collections for Pichi Lemon, performing in TV dramas, lending her voice as an anime voice actor, and filming commercials. On 25 June 2016, Maeshima succeeded group member Rika Shimura as the third group leader of Super Girls.

On 31 March 2017, Maeshima graduated from Super Girls in order to focus on her voice acting career. She debuted as the voice of BanG Dream! character Aya Maruyama the next month.

On 30 November 2022, Maeshima went on hiatus from all entertainment activities due to health issues. As a result, she terminated her contract with Avex Inc. and stepped down from her roles as Aya Maruyama in BanG Dream! and Ibuki Niijima in D4DJ.

On 1 September 2023, Maeshima announced her comeback and joined a new voice acting firm, Voice Kit. On the same day, BanG Dream! also announced that she would continue to play her role as Aya Maruyama.

== Filmography ==
=== Theatre ===
Year	Title	Role
2015	Death Note The Musical	Sayu Yagami
2015	Za・Hana Miyo Concerto	Tsubame
2016	Kujira no Kora wa Saji~Youniutau	Ricos
2016	Luna Rossa	Anna
2017	Kōfukuna Shokuba	Satomi Yoshioka
2017	Ookami to Odore〜Dragon, Dance with Wolves〜	Franc
2017	Rengoku Stage	Okuni
2017	Department Store!	Nami
2018	Bloody Poetry	Harriet Westbrook
2018	Bakuse	Aki
2019	Devil May Cry – The Live Hacker	Elise
2020	Pastel*Palettes Special Performance ~Manmaru Oyama ni Irodori Special☆~	Aya Maruyama
2021	Pastel*Palettes Special Live "TITLE DREAM"	Aya Maruyama

=== Anime ===
Year	Title	Role	Notes	Source
2011	Pretty Rhythm: Aurora Dream	Natsuki	Also performed the first ending theme with SUPER☆GiRLS	
2015	PriPara	Theme Song Performer	Performed the fifth ending theme with SUPER☆GiRLS	
2018	Pastel Life	Aya Maruyama		
2018	BanG Dream! Girls Band Party! Pico	Aya Maruyama		
2019	BanG Dream! 2nd Season	Aya Maruyama		
2019	Bermuda Triangle: Colorful Pastrale	Theme Song Performer	Performed the opening theme with Pastel＊Palettes	
2019	BanG Dream! Film Live	Aya Maruyama	Anime film	
2020	BanG Dream! 3rd Season	Aya Maruyama		
2020	BanG Dream! Girls Band Party! Pico: Ohmori	Aya Maruyama		
2020	BNA: Brand New Animal	Nina Flip		
2021	D4DJ First Mix	Ibuki Niijima		
2021	D4DJ Petit Mix	Ibuki Niijima		
2021	BanG Dream! Film Live 2nd Stage	Aya Maruyama	Anime film	
2021	BanG Dream! Girls Band Party! Pico Fever!	Aya Maruyama		
2021	Komi Can't Communicate	Makeru Yadano		
2025	Private Tutor to the Duke's Daughter	Caren		
2025	My Awkward Senpai	Miho Hotta		
2026	Cyberpunk: Edgerunners 2	Omi		
2027	Everyone's Darling Has a Secret	Sora Konno		

=== TV dramas ===
Year	Title	Role	Network
2012	Sprout	Ami Uehara	Nippon TV
2012	Tsurideka jap	Marina	TBS
2013	The Family Game	Herself	Fuji TV
2013	Chouzetsu☆Zekkyouland jap	Nodoka Haramura	CBC

=== Radio ===
Year	Title	Role	Network	Notes
2011	DJ Tomoaki's Radio Show	Assistant MC	Shimokita-FM	
2018	Seishun Adventure: Yotsuyuhime	Ibara	NHK-FM	Audio Drama

=== Multimedia projects ===
Year	Title	Role	Source
2017–2022; 2023–present	BanG Dream!	Aya Maruyama	
2019–2022	D4DJ	Ibuki Niijima	
