= Eiichiro Funakoshi =

Japanese actor, tarento, and presenter (born 1960)

- 船越 英一郎
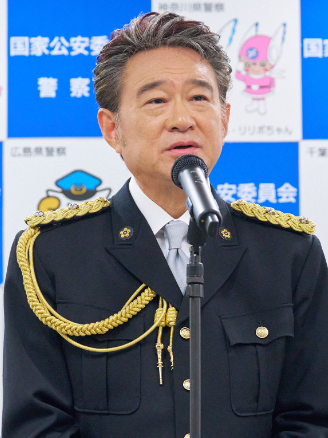
- Born: 21 July 1960 (age 66); Yugawara, Ashigarashimo District, Kanagawa, Japan
- Occupations: Actor; tarento; presenter
- Years active: 1982–present
- Television: Dramas; Kasai Chōsakan Renjiro Kurenai (2 hour dramas); Kariya Keibu Series; Sono Otoko, Fuku Shochō; Variety; Guruguru Ninety Nine Gochi ni narimasu!
- Spouse(s): Kazuyo Matsui (m. 2001; div. 2017) Moeko Matsushita (m. 2025)
- Children: 1
- Parents: Eiji Funakoshi (father); Yumiko Hasegawa (mother)
- Relatives: Yoko Hirano (sister)

Eiichiro Funakoshi (船越 英一郎, 船越 栄一郎, Funakoshi Eiichirō; born July 21, 1960, in Yugawara, Ashigarashimo District, Kanagawa) is a Japanese actor, tarento, and presenter. He is represented with Horipro.

He graduated from Nihon University Mishima High School and Nihon University College of Arts Film Department (in which he was classmates with Hiroyuki Sanada).

His father was Eiji Funakoshi, who was also an actor, and his mother was Yumiko Hasegawa. His great uncle was Kazuo Hasegawa (his wife Shige Iijima was Eiichiro's grandmother and their daughter was Matsu Iijima). His uncle was Ken Mishima (real name: Eitaro Funakoshi). His former wife is actress Kazuyo Matsui, and his current wife was Moeko Matsushita. His mother's great-grandfather was Jiro Iijima, founder of the Iijima Association, who formed a temporary name in railway construction. His sister was Yoko Hirano.

== Filmography ==
=== Television ===
Year	Title	Role	Notes	Ref.
1983	The Women of Osaka Castle	Toyotomi Hideyori	Television film	
2007–09	Sono Otoko, Fuku-shochō	Kiyomi Ikegami	Lead role; 3 seasons	
2016	Saijō no Meii	Chikage Hojo		
2017	Nekonin	Kenzan Kuze		

=== Film ===
Year	Title	Role	Notes	Ref.
2006	Doraemon: Nobita's Dinosaur 2006	Black Mask (voice)		
2007	A Tale of Mari and Three Puppies	Yuichi Ishikawa	Lead role	
2017	Nekonin	Kenzan Kuze		
2024	My Mom, My Angel: A Journey of Love and Acceptance	Kazuya Kosugi		
2026	Mr. Osomatsu: Project Slackers			
2027	Kono Natsu, Dare mo Sukuenai Bokura wa, Sora ni Sakenda	Watanabe		

=== Video games ===
Year	Title	Role	Notes	Ref.
2014	Ryū ga Gotoku Ishin!	Kondō Isami		
