= Kazuyo Matsui =

- 松居 一代
- Born: 25 June 1957 (age 69); Ōmihachiman, Shiga Prefecture, Japan
- Occupations: Actress; essayist; businesswoman; investor
- Years active: 1979–present
- Spouse: Eiichiro Funakoshi (m. 2001; div. 2017)
- Father: Shu Matsui

Kazuyo Matsui (松居 一代, Matsui Kazuyo; born 25 June 1957 in Ōmihachiman, Shiga Prefecture) is a Japanese actress, investor, businesswoman, essayist, university professor (special appointment), and lifestyle (household chores) adviser. Her married name was Kazuyo Funakoshi (船越 一代, Funakoshi Kazuyo). She divorced her husband Eiichiro Funakoshi in December 2017. She is represented by the Kazuyo Matsui Jimusho agency.

== Major films ==
Year	Title	Notes
1984	Rouge	
1986	Shōgeki Performance	
1987	A Taxing Woman	
1988	Nikutai no Mon	
1989	Sensei	
1992	Shin Ureshi Hazukashi Monogatari: Tenshi no Kiss Mark	Distributed by Nikkatsu Video
1993	Yonigeya Honpo 2	
1996	Hissatsu! Omomizu Shisu	
1999	Minami no Teiō: Gekijō-ban Part XII	

== Major television programmes ==
=== Dramas ===
Years	Title	Role	Network	Production	Notes
1981–82	Gennosuke Yonaoshi Chō		NTV		
1983	Ōedo Sōsamō		TX	Mifune Pro	Episode 600 "Onna Goroshi Hachiōji Sen-ri Gundan mo Nazo"
1985	Hitachi TV City / Shōwa Rhapsody		TBS		
1986	Abarenbō Shōgun II	Oren	EX	Toei	Episode 169 "Kanashī Yoake o Matsu Onna!"
1987	Ā Kazoku		TBS		
1988	Dance School Renzoku Satsujin		EX		
1988	Kyōto Nishijin Satsujin Jiken	Kayo Kobayashi	EX		
1989	Oniheihan Kachō	Osono	CX		1st Series Episode 3 "Hebi no Me"
1991	Hadaka no Taishō Hōrōki		KTV		Episode 50 "Shin no Teruteru Bōzu - Isawa-hen"
1992	Kaseifu wa Mita! 11		EX		
1995	Tottemo Oyako	Reiko Kitagawa	TBS		
1996	Shōgun no Onmitsu! Kage Jūhachi		EX	Toei	Episode 7 "Edojō Ōoku Yuganda Haha no Ai"

== Bibliography ==
Date	Title	Publisher	ISBN	Ref.
2000	Kekkan Mansion, waga Tōsō Nikki ― Zenekon ni Katta! Sōzetsu 600-nichi no Zen Kiroku	PHP Kenkyūjo	ISBN 4569608647	
2004	Kazuyo Matsui no Super Osōji-jutsu	Shufu to Seikatsusha	ISBN 4391129876	
October 2005	Kazuyo Matsui no Chō Seiri Jūnōjutsu	Shufu to Seikatsusha	ISBN 4391130904	
2006	Kazuyo Matsui no Kaiun Osōji Hon	Shufu to Seikatsusha	ISBN 4391132516	
2007	Kazuyo Matsui no Chō Oryōri-jutsu	Shufu to Seikatsusha	ISBN 4391135078	
