= Moeko Matsushita =

Japanese actress and singer

- Born: 19 December 1982 (age 43); Kobe, Japan
- Occupations: Film actress, musician
- Years active: 2001–present
- Agent: Oscar Promotion
- Spouse: Eiichiro Funakoshi (m. 2025)
- Children: 1

Moeko Matsushita (松下 萌子, Matsushita Moeko) is a Japanese singer and actress from Hyōgo, Japan. Currently, she is an artist.

Her most famous TV role to date was on Pretty Guardian Sailor Moon as Hina Kusaka. She entered the spotlight at age 15 when she won the multimedia prize of the Japan Bishōjo Contest, a beauty contest. In 2001, Moeko released her first single "Natsu Iro" on the label Avex Trax. That same year, she released two other singles. After the release of her single, "Sotsugyō", she switched her main focus to acting.

Major television roles include Pretty Guardian Sailor Moon; she also appeared on stage as Sleeping Beauty in 2006 and 2007.

== Discography ==
=== Singles ===
- (2001.06.13) "Natsu Iro"
- (2001.08.29) "Ame Agari" (also used as one of the end themes for the anime series Battle Doll Angelic Layer)
- (2001.11.21) "Hello"
- (2002.02.14) "Sotsugyō" ("Graduation"; a cover of Yuki Saito's 1985 debut single)
- (2003.01.08) "Ame" (a cover of Chisato Moritaka's 1990 single)

=== DVD ===
- (2002.03.13) "Moeco TV"

== Cast ==
=== TV ===
- 2002: NBA Mania – main personality regular
- 2002: BEAT BOX!! – Monday, Wednesday regular
- 2003: Otakara Eizō Kuizu Mireba Nattoku! – Guest panelists
- 2003: Yankī Bokōnikaeru – Tezuka Mayumi
- 2003–2004: Pretty Guardian Sailor Moon – Hina Kusaka
- 2004: Ai no Sorea – Tadokoro Rinko (child)
- 2005: Sanryūdaigakuōendan – Sasamoto Junko/ guest appearance
- 2005: Yukemuri u~ōzu ~ Okami ni narimasu ~ – Kawamura Naoko
- 2005: Satō 4 shimai – Nishikawa Noriko
- 2005: Taga kokoro nimo ryu wa nemuru

=== Movies ===
- 2005: Dare ga Kokoro ni mo Ryūhanemuru – Aizawa Chie
- 2006: Memories of Matsuko
- 2006: Mayonaka no Shōjo-Tachi ~<First Story Shibuya Drops>

=== Stage ===
- 2006–2007: Sleeping Beauty (Mitsukoshi theater) – princess
- 2007: Cross Sense (Theatre Ginza)
- 2009: `Shigeru zō'~ Tozasareta Kako ~ (Kyobashi Kagetsu)
- 2009: TOKYOWAY NEWSICAL [Tokyo Way New radical] "7@dash II"～Gyōmu Renraku! (The Pocket) – Starring the actress is no longer stay
- 2010: Genjimonogatari × Oguro Maki Song ~ Boku wa, Jūnihitoe ni Koi o Suru ~ (Ō Shima ginga theater)

=== Radio ===
- 2001: RIDE ON MUSIC nai "NEXT TRACKS・MOECO club" (TBS Radio, regular)
- 2001–2003: Matsushita Moeko no moetsu CO club (Zenkoku 7-kyoku net)
- 2002: Matsushita Moeko no Pine la mode (TFM・JFN, 33 station Internet radio golden age, New $ parlor nationwide)
- 2005–2006: Matsushita Moeko Nejikimami no J' s JOURNAL (CS digital broadcasting music, J-WAVE and USEN net broadcasting)
- 2006: It is also the captain of the campaign in July listener's Week 2006 of the radio broadcaster of local Kansai Kobe.

=== CM/ad ===
- 2001: Otafuku Yakisoba Sōsu
- 2003: Naganuma Shizu Kimono Gakuin Image Character
- 2003: Mi Tama Matsuri Image Character

== Bibliography ==
=== Book ===
- Matsushita Moeko First Shashin-shū MOECO(2003)

=== Magazine series ===
- MUSIQ? – series column "moeco to you" (Up to series vol.1 ~ vol.6, had served up vol.1 ~ vol.6 MC also a DVD that is attached to the "MUSIQ?". The resume from vol.10 only column)
