= Jin Jin Jingle Bell =

1995 Christmas song by Chisato Moritaka

Single by Chisato Moritaka
- Language: Japanese
- B-side: "Gin Gin Gingle Bell; Ichigatsu Ichijitsu"
- Released: December 1, 1995
- Recorded: 1995
- Genre: J-pop; Christmas
- Length: 3:44
- Label: One Up Music
- Songwriter: Chisato Moritaka
- Producer: Yukio Seto

Chisato Moritaka singles chronology
| "Yasumi no Gogo" (1995) | "Jin Jin Jingle Bell" (1995) | "So Blue" (1996) |

"Jin Jin Jingle Bell" (ジン ジン ジングルベル, Jin Jin Jinguru Beru) is a Christmas song and the 27th single by Japanese singer/songwriter Chisato Moritaka. Written by Moritaka, the single was released by One Up Music on December 1, 1995. The song is a modified version of "Gin Gin Gin", which Moritaka wrote for a Suntory Ice Gin commercial. The first B-side is "Gin Gin Gingle Bell", which was used for the Suntory Ice Gin Christmas commercial that year. The second B-side is Moritaka's cover of "Ichigatsu Ichijitsu", a popular Japanese New Year's Day song.

== Chart performance ==
"Jin Jin Jingle Bell" peaked at No. 2 on Oricon's singles chart and sold 253,000 copies. It was also certified Gold by the RIAJ.

== Other versions ==
Moritaka re-recorded the song and uploaded the video on her YouTube channel on December 1, 2012. This version is also included in Moritaka's 2013 self-covers DVD album Love Vol. 3. Moritaka uploaded different self-covers of the song annually until 2016.

The song was remixed by tofubeats in the 2014 collaboration album Chisato Moritaka with tofubeats: Moritaka Tofu.

== Track listing ==
All songs are written by Chisato Moritaka, except where indicated; all music is arranged by Yuichi Takahashi.

8 cm CD
| No. | Title | Lyrics | Music | Length |
|---|---|---|---|---|
| 1. | "Jin Jin Jingle Bell" (Jin Jin Jinguru Beru (ジン ジン ジングルベル)) | | | 3:44 |
| 2. | "Gin Gin Gingle Bell" (Jin Jin Jinguru Beru (GIN GIN ジングルベル)) | | | 2:24 |
| 3. | "Ichigatsu Ichijitsu" ((一月一日; "January 1")) | Takatomi Senge | Sanemichi Ue | 4:24 |
| 4. | "Jin Jin Jingle Bell" (Original Karaoke) | | | 3:39 |

== Personnel ==
- Chisato Moritaka – vocals, drums
- Yasuaki Maejima – piano, Fender Rhodes
- Masafumi Yokoyama – bass
- Yuichi Takahashi – guitar, keyboard, programming
- Yukio Seto – guitar

== Chart positions ==
| Chart (1995) | Peak position |
|---|---|
| Japanese Oricon Singles Chart | 2 |

== Certification ==
| Region | Certification | Certified units/sales |
|---|---|---|
| Japan (RIAJ) | Gold | 200,000^{^} |
^{^} Shipments figures based on certification alone.

== Nozomi Sasaki version ==
"Jin Jin Jingle Bell feat. Pentaphonic"

Single by Nozomi Sasaki

from the album Nozomi Collection
- Language: Japanese
- Released: November 24, 2010
- Recorded: 2010
- Genre: J-pop; Christmas
- Label: SME Records
- Composer: Chisato Moritaka
- Lyricists: Chisato Moritaka; Pentaphonic

Nozomi Sasaki singles chronology
| "Kamu to Funyan feat. Astro" (2010) | "Jin Jin Jingle Bell feat. Pentaphonic" (2010) | "Papepipu ♪ Papipepu ♪ Papepipupo ♪" (2011) |

Japanese model and singer Nozomi Sasaki covered "Jin Jin Jingle Bell" as her second single on November 24, 2010. This version features rap lyrics by Pentaphonic. The single peaked at No. 29 on Oricon's singles chart.

=== Track listing ===
All lyrics are written by Chisato Moritaka and Pentaphonic; all music is composed by Moritaka and Masaru Iwabuchi; all music is arranged by Iwabuchi.

CD

| No. | Title | Length |
|---|---|---|
| 1. | "Jin Jin Jingle Bell feat. Pentaphonic" ((ジン ジン ジングルベル feat. Pentaphonic)) |
| 2. | "Jin Jin Jingle Bell feat. Pentaphonic 〜VIVID Neon*-CELEB PARTY REMIX〜" ((ジン ジン ジングルベル feat. Pentaphonic 〜VIVID Neon*-CELEB PARTY REMIX〜)) |
| 3. | "Jin Jin Jingle Bell feat. Pentaphonic (Girls' Karaoke)" ((ジン ジン ジングルベル feat. Pentaphonic ガールズカラオケ)) |
| 4. | "Jin Jin Jingle Bell feat. Pentaphonic (Men's Karaoke)" ((ジン ジン ジングルベル feat. Pentaphonic メンズカラオケ)) |

DVD

- "Jin Jin Jingle Bell" (Music video)

=== Chart positions ===
| Chart (2010) | Peak position |
|---|---|
| Japanese Oricon Singles Chart | 29 |

== Super Girls version ==
"Jin Jin Jingle Bell"
- CD + DVD cover

Single by Twinkle Veil from Super Girls

from the album Chōzetsu Shōjo Best 2010〜2014
- Language: Japanese
- B-side: "Survival"
- Released: December 4, 2013
- Recorded: 2013
- Genre: J-pop; Christmas
- Label: Idol Street
- Songwriter: Chisato Moritaka

Twinkle Veil from Super Girls singles chronology
| "Tokonatsu High Touch" (2013) | "Jin Jin Jingle Bell" (2013) | "Sorairo no Kiseki" (2014) |

Music video
- Jin Jin Jingle Bell on YouTube

Japanese idol group Super Girls (performing as Twinkle Veil from Super Girls (トゥインクルヴェール from SUPER☆GiRLS)) covered "Jin Jin Jingle Bell" as their eighth single on December 4, 2013. The single peaked at No. 10 on Oricon's singles chart and sold 12,137 copies.

=== Track listing ===
CD + DVD

CD
| No. | Title | Lyrics | Music | Arrangement | Length |
|---|---|---|---|---|---|
| 1. | "Jin Jin Jingle Bell" ((ジン ジン ジングルベル)) | Chisato Moritaka | Moritaka |
| 2. | "Survival" | Cass Moritsuki | Katsumi Onishi | The Rog |

DVD
| No. | Title | Length |
|---|---|---|
| 1. | "Jin Jin Jingle Bell (Music Video)" ((ジン ジン ジングルベル (MUSIC VIDEO))) |
| 2. | "Jin Jin Jingle Bell (Music Video Making)" ((ジン ジン ジングルベル (MUSIC VIDEO MAKING))) |

CD Single

| No. | Title | Lyrics | Music | Arrangement | Length |
|---|---|---|---|---|---|
| 1. | "Jin Jin Jingle Bell" ((ジン ジン ジングルベル)) | Moritaka | Moritaka |
| 2. | "Survival" | Moritsuki | Onishi | The Rog |
| 3. | "Jin Jin Jingle Bell (Instrumental)" ((ジン ジン ジングルベル (Instrumental))) | Moritaka | Moritaka |
| 4. | "Survival (Instrumental)" | Moritsuki | Onishi | The Rog |

CD Single [Event Venue / mu-mo Shop Limited Edition]

| No. | Title | Lyrics | Music | Arrangement | Length |
|---|---|---|---|---|---|
| 1. | "Jin Jin Jingle Bell" ((ジン ジン ジングルベル)) | Moritaka | Moritaka |
| 2. | "Survival" | Moritsuki | Onishi | The Rog |
| 3. | "'Hello from Twinkle Veil' Recording" (トゥィンクルヴェール のレコーディングからこんにちわ! (Tuinkuru Vēru no Rekōdingu kara Kon'nichiwa!)) |

=== Chart positions ===
| Chart (2013) | Peak position |
|---|---|
| Japanese Oricon Singles Chart | 10 |

== Other cover versions ==
- Runa Miyoshida covered the song on her 2021 Christmas EP Flowers of Love: X'mas Ska.
