= So Blue (Chisato Moritaka song) =

1996 song by Chisato Moritaka

Single by Chisato Moritaka

from the album Taiyo
- Language: Japanese
- B-side: "Moritaka Samba"
- Released: February 19, 1996
- Recorded: 1995
- Genre: J-pop; pop rock
- Length: 4:37
- Label: One Up Music
- Composer: Hiromasa Ijichi
- Lyricist: Chisato Moritaka
- Producer: Yukio Seto

Chisato Moritaka singles chronology
"Jin Jin Jingle Bell" (1995)	"So Blue" (1996)	"La La Sunshine" (1996)

Music video
- So Blue on YouTube

"So Blue" (ソー・ブルー, Sō Burū) is the 28th single by Japanese singer/songwriter Chisato Moritaka. Written by Moritaka and Hiromasa Ijichi, the single was released by One Up Music on February 19, 1996. The song was used as the opening theme of the TBS music series Count Down TV.

== Music video ==
The music video features Moritaka performing the song at a dance hall with her band "Chisato Moritaka Lonely Hearts Club Band", a nod to her love of The Beatles' music.

== Chart performance ==
"So Blue" peaked at No. 7 on Oricon's singles chart and sold 270,000 copies. It was also certified Gold by the RIAJ.

== Other versions ==
Moritaka re-recorded the song and uploaded the video on her YouTube channel on August 16, 2013. This version is also included in Moritaka's 2014 self-covers DVD album Love Vol. 5.

== Track listing ==
All lyrics are written by Chisato Moritaka; all music is arranged by Yuichi Takahashi.

8 cm CD
No.	Title	Music	Length
1.	"So Blue"	Hiromasa Ijichi	4:37
2.	"Moritaka Samba" (Moritaka Sanba (千里サンバ))	Moritaka	4:39
3.	"So Blue" (Original Karaoke)		4:34

== Personnel ==
- Chisato Moritaka – vocals, drums, piano
- Yasuaki Maejima – piano, Fender Rhodes, percussion
- Yuichi Takahashi – guitar, keyboard
- Yukio Seto – bass
- Masafumi Yokoyama – bass

== Chart positions ==
Charts (1996)	Peak position
Japanese Oricon Singles Chart	7

== Certification ==
Region	Certification	Certified units/sales
Japan (RIAJ)	Gold	200,000^{^}
^{^} Shipments figures based on certification alone.
