= Watashi ga Obasan ni Natte mo =

1992 song by Chisato Moritaka

Single by Chisato Moritaka

from the album Rock Alive
- Language: Japanese
- English title: Even If I Become an Old Lady
- B-side: "Jitensha Tsūgaku"
- Released: June 25, 1992
- Recorded: 1992
- Genre: J-pop; pop rock
- Length: 4:16
- Label: Warner Music Japan
- Composer: Hideo Saitō
- Lyricist: Chisato Moritaka
- Producer: Yukio Seto

Chisato Moritaka singles chronology
"Concert no Yoru" (1992)	"Watashi ga Obasan ni Natte mo" (1992)	"Watarasebashi/ Writer Shibō" (1993)

Music video
- Watashi ga Obasan ni Natte mo on YouTube

"Watashi ga Obasan ni Natte mo" (私がオバさんになっても; lit. "Even If I Become an Old Lady") is the 16th single by Japanese singer/songwriter Chisato Moritaka. The lyrics were written by Moritaka and the music was composed by Hideo Saitō. The single was released by Warner Music Japan on June 25, 1992.

== Background ==
Moritaka wrote "Watashi ga Obasan ni Natte mo" when she was 20 after being told by male staff of her management that women reach their prime at age 19. The song describes a woman's wish for a man to accept her, regardless of her age. It partially draws inspiration from The Beatles' "When I'm Sixty-Four".

The song was used as the opening theme of the NTV drama series Matta Nashi! (まったナシ!; Total Pear!). Moritaka wrote the lyrics for the B-side "Jitensha Tsūgaku" (自転車通学; lit. "Bicycle Commuting"), based on her experiences commuting to school by bicycle.

== Music video ==
No music video of the song was made at the time the single was released, but in 2001, a re-edit of the song performance from Moritaka's 1993 live video Live Rock Alive was included as a music video in the DVD Chisato Moritaka DVD Collection No. 15, which was a mail-in order exclusive for those who purchased the first edition release of DVD Collection Nos. 1-14. On June 25, 2022, Warner Music Japan uploaded a remastered version of the music video on Apple Music to commemorate the 30th anniversary of the single.

== Chart performance and reception ==
"Watashi ga Obasan ni Natte mo" peaked at No. 15 on Oricon's singles chart and sold 228,000 copies, and has since become one of Moritaka's most popular songs. It was also certified Gold by the RIAJ in December 1992. During the 43rd Kōhaku Uta Gassen, when Moritaka was part of the Red team, host Hikari Ishida introduced the song as "A song that gave all women the courage!" (すべての女性に勇気を与えた歌です！, Subete no josei ni yūki wo ataeta uta desu!).

In his 2019 article, music journalist and blogger Tomonori Shiba noted that the song symbolized a shift in women's attitudes during the Heisei era.

== Other versions ==
Moritaka's 2013 live album YouTube Public Recording & Live at Yokohama Blitz features "Aru OL ga Obasan ni Natte mo" (あるOLがオバさんになっても; lit. "Even if an Office Lady Becomes an Old Lady"), with the lyrics of this song performed to the tune of her 1990 song "Aru OL no Seishun ~ A-ko no Baai ~ (Moritaka Connection)".

The song was remixed by tofubeats in the 2014 collaboration album Chisato Moritaka with tofubeats: Moritaka Tofu.

In 2015, Moritaka re-recorded the song for a series of Kosé cosmetics commercials she starred in. This version, titled "Watashi ga Obasan ni Natte mo (Slow Version)" (私がオバさんになっても（スローヴァージョン）) was included in her 2017 self-covers DVD album Love Vol. 10.

In 2019, she performed a brief a cappella version of the song in a commercial promoting DHC Queen of Serum anti-aging skin cream.

== Track listing ==
All lyrics are written by Chisato Moritaka.

8 cm CD
No.	Title	Music	Arrangement	Length
1.	"Watashi ga Obasan ni Natte mo" ((私がオバさんになっても; "Even If I Become an Old Lady"))	Hideo Saitō	Saitō	4:16
2.	"Jitensha Tsūgaku" ((自転車通学; "Bicycle Commuting"))	Yuichi Takahashi	Takahashi	4:04

Cassette
No.	Title	Music	Arrangement	Length
1.	"Watashi ga Obasan ni Natte mo"	Saitō	Saitō
2.	"Jitensha Tsūgaku"	Takahashi	Takahashi
3.	"Watashi ga Obasan ni Natte mo" (Karaoke)
4.	"Jitensha Tsūgaku" (Karaoke)

2023 7-inch vinyl
No.	Title	Music	Arrangement	Length
1.	"Watashi ga Obasan ni Natte mo" (Album Version)	Saitō	Saitō
2.	"Watashi ga Obasan ni Natte mo" (Slow Version)	Saitō	Takahashi

== Personnel ==
- Chisato Moritaka – vocals
- Hideo Saitō – all instruments, programming, backing vocals

== Charts ==
Chart (1992)	Peak position
Japanese Oricon Singles Chart	15

== Certification ==
Region	Certification	Certified units/sales
Japan (RIAJ)	Gold	200,000^{^}
^{^} Shipments figures based on certification alone.

== Cover versions ==
- McKee covered the song in Tagalog as "Hindi Kaya" on their 1996 self-titled album.
- Runa Miyoshida covered the song on her 2008 album Ska Flavor #1.
- navy&ivory covered the song on their 2009 album Nakeru hodo Suki na Hito.
- Misono covered the song on her 2010 album Cover Album 2.
- Nozomi Tsuji covered the song on her 2010 album Minna Happy! Mama no Uta.
- Yūko Minaguchi covered the song for the 2011 LovePlus soundtrack.
- Mitsu covered the song on their 2012 single "Hatsukoi Capsule" and cover album Mitsukari.
- You Kikkawa covered the song as the B-side of her 2012 single "Darling and Madonna" and her cover album Vocalist?.
- Saya Asakura covered the song on her 2014 album Hōgen Kakumei, with the lyrics changed to Yamagata-ben.
- Konomi Suzuki covered the song on her 2015 album 18 -Colorful Gift-.
- Michiru Hoshino covered the song on her 2016 album My Favorite Song.
- Tsubaki Factory covered the song as the B-side of their 2016 single "Hitorijime".
- Maria Satō of The Dance for Philosophy covered the song as part of the group's "Tiny Bath Concert" video series in 2021.
