= Hachigatsu no Koi =

1991 song by Chisato Moritaka

Single by Chisato Moritaka

from the album The Moritaka
- Language: Japanese
- English title: Love in August
- B-side: "Itsumademo"
- Released: June 25, 1991
- Recorded: 1991
- Genre: J-pop; kayōkyoku
- Length: 4:12
- Label: Warner Pioneer
- Composer: Kyōhei Tsutsumi
- Lyricist: Chisato Moritaka
- Producer: Yukio Seto

Chisato Moritaka singles chronology
"Benkyō no Uta/ Kono Machi" (1991)	"Hachigatsu no Koi" (1991)	"Fight!!" (1991)

Music video
- Hachigatsu no Koi on YouTube

"Hachigatsu no Koi" (八月の恋; lit. "Love in August") is the 13th single by Japanese singer/songwriter Chisato Moritaka. Written by Moritaka and Kyōhei Tsutsumi, the single was released by Warner Pioneer on June 25, 1991.

== Background ==
This was Moritaka's first collaboration with Tsutsumi after the success of her 1989 cover of "17-sai", which Tsutsumi originally co-wrote for Saori Minami in 1971. The resulting composition was a kayōkyoku ballad with Canzone Napoletana influences.

The B-side is "Itsumademo", which was used as the ending theme of the 1991 anime TV series The Twins at St. Clare's.

== Chart performance ==
"Hachigatsu no Koi" peaked at No. 6 on Oricon's singles chart and sold 106,000 copies.

== Other versions ==
Moritaka re-recorded the song and uploaded the video on her YouTube channel on August 8, 2012. This version is also included in Moritaka's 2013 self-covers DVD album Love Vol. 1.

== Track listing ==
All lyrics are written by Chisato Moritaka; all music is arranged by Hideo Saitō.

8 cm CD
No.	Title	Music	Length
1.	"Hachigatsu no Koi" ((八月の恋; "Love in August"))	Kyōhei Tsutsumi	4:12
2.	"Itsumademo" ((いつまでも; "Forever and Ever"))	Shinji Yasuda	4:27

Cassette
No.	Title	Music	Length
1.	"Hachigatsu no Koi"	Tsutsumi
2.	"Itsumademo"	Yasuda
3.	"Hachigatsu no Koi" (Karaoke)
4.	"Itsumademo" (Karaoke)

== Personnel ==
- Chisato Moritaka – vocals
- Hideo Saitō – all instruments, programming, backing vocals

== Charts ==
Chart (1991)	Peak position
Japanese Oricon Singles Chart	6
