= Kusai Mono ni wa Futa wo Shiro!! =

1990 song by Chisato Moritaka

Single by Chisato Moritaka

from the album The Moritaka
- Language: Japanese
- English title: Shut Your Stinking Trap!!
- B-side: "Nozokanaide"
- Released: May 25, 1990
- Recorded: 1990
- Genre: J-pop; pop rock
- Length: 2:41
- Label: Warner Pioneer
- Composer: Hideo Saitō
- Lyricist: Chisato Moritaka
- Producer: Yukio Seto

Chisato Moritaka singles chronology
"Michi/Seishun" (1990)	"Kusai Mono ni wa Futa wo Shiro!!" (1990)	"Ame" (1990)

Kusai Mono ni wa Futa wo Shiro!!

Video by Chisato Moritaka
- Released: March 25, 1991
- Genres: J-pop; pop rock
- Language: Japanese
- Label: Warner Pioneer
- Producer: Yukio Seto

Chisato Moritaka chronology
The Third Live Video Hijitsuryokuha Sengen (1990)	Kusai Mono ni wa Futa wo Shiro!! (1991)	Kokon Tozai ~ Oni ga Deru ka Hebi ga Deru ka Tour Live Video Vol. 4 (1991)

"Kusai Mono ni wa Futa wo Shiro!!" (臭いものにはフタをしろ!!; lit. "Shut Your Stinking Trap!!") is the 10th single by Japanese singer-songwriter Chisato Moritaka. Written by Moritaka and Hideo Saitō, the single was released by Warner Pioneer on May 25, 1990. Known for its unique rockabilly tune, the song was used in a Pioneer cordless phone commercial featuring Moritaka.

The music video LaserDisc was released on March 25, 1991, with its contents compiled in the 2000 DVD Chisato Moritaka DVD Collection No. 6: Kusai Mono ni wa Futa wo Shiro!!/Rock Alive.

== Chart performance ==
"Kusai Mono ni wa Futa wo Shiro!!" peaked at No. 4 on Oricon's singles chart and sold 117,000 copies.

== Other versions ==
Two remixes of "Kusai Mono ni wa Futa wo Shiro!!" and one remix of "Nozokanaide" are included in Moritaka's 1991 remix album The Moritaka.

Moritaka re-recorded the song and uploaded the video on her YouTube channel on her birthday on April 11, 2014. This version is also included in Moritaka's 2015 self-covers DVD album Love Vol. 7.

== Track listing ==
All lyrics are written by Chisato Moritaka; all music is composed and arranged by Hideo Saitō, except where indicated.

8 cm CD
No.	Title	Length
1.	"Kusai Mono ni wa Futa wo Shiro!!" ((臭いものにはフタをしろ!!; "Shut Your Stinking Trap!!"))	2:41
2.	"Nozokanaide" ((のぞかないで; "Don't Look"))	4:33

Cassette
No.	Title	Length
1.	"Kusai Mono ni wa Futa wo Shiro!!"
2.	"Nozokanaide"
3.	"Kusai Mono ni wa Futa wo Shiro!!" (Karaoke)
4.	"Nozokanaide" (Karaoke)

LaserDisc
No.	Title	Music	Arrangement	Length
1.	"Michi" ((道; "Road"))	Shinji Yasuda
2.	"Michi (Chisato-hime no Bōken)" ((道 (千里姫の冒険); "Road (Princess Chisato's Adventure)"))	Yasuda
3.	"Kusai Mono ni wa Futa wo Shiro!!" ((臭いものにはフタをしろ!!; "Shut Your Stinking Trap!!"))
4.	"The Busters Blues" (Za Basutāzu Burūsu (ザ・バスターズ・ブルース))
5.	"Bangai-hen ~ Tsukiyo no Kōkai" ((番外篇～月夜の航海; "Extra Chapter ~ Moonlight Voyage"))	Yuichi Takahashi	Takahashi

== Personnel ==
- Chisato Moritaka – vocals
- Hideo Saitō – all instruments, programming, backing vocals

== Charts ==
Chart (1990)	Peak position
Japanese Oricon Singles Chart	4

== See also ==
- 1990 in Japanese music
