= La La Sunshine =

1996 song by Chisato Moritaka

Single by Chisato Moritaka

from the album Taiyo
- Language: Japanese
- B-side: "Mukashi no Hito wa..."
- Released: June 10, 1996; April 16, 2008 (re-release)
- Recorded: 1996
- Genre: J-pop; pop rock
- Length: 3:43
- Label: One Up Music zetima (re-release)
- Composer: Hiromasa Ijichi
- Lyricist: Chisato Moritaka
- Producer: Yukio Seto

Chisato Moritaka singles chronology
"So Blue" (1996)	"La La Sunshine" (1996)	"Gin'iro no Yume" (1996)

Chisato Moritaka singles chronology
"Ichido Asobi ni Kite yo '99" (1999)	"La La Sunshine (reissue)" (2008)	"Ame/ Watarasebashi" (2009)

"La La Sunshine" (ララ サンシャイン, Ra Ra Sanshain) is the 29th single by Japanese singer/songwriter Chisato Moritaka. The lyrics were written by Moritaka and the music was composed by Hiromasa Ijichi. The single was released by One Up Music on June 10, 1996. The song was used as the opening and ending theme of Fuji TV's news magazine program Mezamashi TV from April 1, 1996 to March 28, 1997. The single was re-released by zetima on April 16, 2008 with a bonus DVD containing the music video to coincide with the song's use by Kao Corporation for a Blaune hair coloring commercial featuring Moritaka.

== Background ==
Moritaka's 10th studio album Taiyo contains the song "Natsu wa Paralleilon (La La Sunshine Part 2)" (夏はパラレイロン（ララサンシャインPart2）, Natsu wa Parareiron (Ra Ra Sanshain Pātsu Tsū); lit. "Summer is a Paralleilon (La La Sunshine Part 2)"). This is because Fuji TV requested for the song to be used on their news magazine program Mezamashi TV. Moritaka modified the song with the word "natsu" (夏; "summer") replaced with "asa" (朝; "morning") in the lyrics, as well as a reworked arrangement to turn it into "La La Sunshine".

Moritaka performed the song on the 47th Kōhaku Uta Gassen.

== Chart performance ==
"La La Sunshine" peaked at No. 5 on Oricon's singles chart and sold 179,000 copies. It was also certified Gold by the RIAJ.

== Other versions ==
Moritaka re-recorded the song and uploaded the video on her YouTube channel on August 20, 2012. This version is also included in Moritaka's 2013 self-covers DVD album Love Vol. 2.

The song was remixed by tofubeats in the 2014 collaboration album Chisato Moritaka with tofubeats: Moritaka Tofu.

== Track listing ==
All lyrics are written by Chisato Moritaka; all music is arranged by Yuichi Takahashi.

8 cm CD / 12 cm CD
No.	Title	Music	Length
1.	"La La Sunshine" (Ra Ra Sanahain (ララ サンシャイン))	Hiromasa Ijichi	3:43
2.	"Mukashi no Hito wa..." ((むかしの人は…; "Once Upon a Time..."))	Moritaka	3:17
3.	"La La Sunshine" (Original Karaoke)		3:41

2008 bonus DVD
No.	Title	Length
1.	"La La Sunshine" (Music video)

== Personnel ==
- Chisato Moritaka – vocals, drums
- Yuichi Takahashi – guitar, keyboard
- Shin Hashimoto – piano
- Yukio Seto – guitar, bass

== Chart positions ==
Charts (1996)	Peak position
Japanese Oricon Singles Chart	5

== Certification ==
Region	Certification	Certified units/sales
Japan (RIAJ)	Gold	200,000^{^}
^{^} Shipments figures based on certification alone.
