= Ame (song) =

1990 song by Chisato Moritaka

Single by Chisato Moritaka

from the album Kokon Tozai
- Language: Japanese
- English title: Rain
- B-side: "Cup Mudle"
- Released: September 10, 1990
- Recorded: 1990
- Genre: J-pop
- Length: 4:33
- Label: Warner Pioneer
- Composer: Seiji Matsuura
- Lyricist: Chisato Moritaka
- Producer: Yukio Seto

Chisato Moritaka singles chronology
"Kusai Mono ni wa Futa wo Shiro!!" (1990)	"Ame" (1990)	"Benkyō no Uta/ Kono Machi" (1991)

Chisato Moritaka singles chronology
"La La Sunshine (reissue)" (2008)	"Ame/ Watarasebashi" (2009)	"Overheat Night (Extended Mix)" (2019)

Alternative cover
- "Ame"/"Watarasebashi" (2009)

Music videos
- "Ame" on YouTube

"Ame" (雨; lit. "Rain") is the 11th single by Japanese singer/songwriter Chisato Moritaka. The lyrics were written by Moritaka and the music was composed by Seiji Matsuura. The single was released by Warner Pioneer on September 10, 1990. A remix of the song, titled "Ame (as right as rain mix)", was released alongside "Watarasebashi" by zetima on November 25, 2009.

The B-side is "Cup Mudle", which is a play on the word Mudol (ミュードル, Myūdoru), a mashup of "musician" and "idol".

== Chart performance ==
"Ame" peaked at No. 2 on Oricon's singles chart and sold 180,000 copies. It became Moritaka's first single to be certified Gold by the RIAJ.

== Other versions ==
"Ame" has been released in numerous versions:

- "Ame (Album Version)": The version in Moritaka's 1990 album Kokon Tozai runs at 5:18.
- "Ame (Rock Version)": A rock arrangement in Moritaka's 1991 remix album The Moritaka.
- "Ame (1999)": Included in Moritaka's 1999 remix album mix age*.
- "Ame (as right as rain mix)": A re-arranged version released as a single on November 25, 2009.

Moritaka re-recorded the song and uploaded the video on her YouTube channel on June 28, 2013. This version is also included in Moritaka's 2013 self-covers DVD album Love Vol. 4.

== Track listing ==
All lyrics are written by Chisato Moritaka; all music is arranged by Hideo Saitō.

8 cm CD
No.	Title	Music	Length
1.	"Ame" ((雨; "Rain"))	Seiji Matsuura	4:33
2.	"Cup Mudle" (Kappu Myūdoru (カップ・ミュードル))	Saitō	3:34

Cassette
No.	Title	Music	Length
1.	"Ame"	Matsuura
2.	"Cup Mudle"	Saitō
3.	"Ame" (Karaoke)	Matsuura
4.	"Cup Mudle" (Karaoke)	Saitō

Ame/Watarasebashi single
No.	Title	Music	Length
1.	"Ame (as right as rain mix)" ((雨 (as right as rain mix); "Rain (as right as rain mix)"))	Matsuura	5:04
2.	"Watarasebashi" ((渡良瀬橋; "Watarase Bridge"))	Saitō	3:48
3.	"Ame (as right as rain mix)" (Instrumental)	Matsuura	5:04
4.	"Watarasebashi" (Instrumental)	Saitō	3:43

== Personnel ==
- Chisato Moritaka – vocals
- Hideo Saitō – all instruments, programming

== Charts ==
Chart (1990)	Peak position
Japanese Oricon Singles Chart	2

== Certification ==
Region	Certification	Certified units/sales
Japan (RIAJ)	Gold	200,000^{^}
^{^} Shipments figures based on certification alone.

== Moeko Matsushita version ==
"Ame"

Single by Moeko Matsushita
- Language: Japanese
- English title: Rain
- B-side: "Summer Breeze; Do-ki-do-ki ~Jitensha ni Notte~"
- Released: January 8, 2003
- Recorded: 2002
- Genre: J-pop
- Length: 4:36
- Label: Avex Trax
- Composer: Seiji Matsuura
- Lyricist: Chisato Moritaka

Moeko Matsushita singles chronology
"Sotsugyō" (2002)	"Ame" (2003)

"Ame" was covered by Moeko Matsushita as her fifth and final single, released by Avex Trax on January 8, 2003. It was used as the ending theme of the NTV variety show TV Ojamanbow (TVおじゃマンボウ, Terebi Oja Manbō). The first B-side, "Summer Breeze", was the ending theme of the Japanese dub of Totally Spies!. The second B-side, "Do-ki-do-ki ~Jitensha ni Notte~", was used for a Seventeen magazine TV commercial.

The single peaked at No. 50 on Oricon's singles chart.

=== Track listing ===
No.	Title	Lyrics	Music	Arrangement	Length
1.	"Ame" ((雨; "Rain"))	Chisato Moritaka	Seiji Matsuura	Takashi Iwato	4:36
2.	"Summer Breeze"	Saiko Kawamura	Tsukasa	Hiroshi Uesugi	4:33
3.	"Do-ki-do-ki ~Jitensha ni Notte~" (ド・キ・ド・キ 〜自転車に乗って〜 ("Do-ki-do-ki ~Riding a Bicycle~"))	moeco	Hideki Kurosawa	Kurosawa	4:10
4.	"Ame" (Instrumental)				4:36
5.	"Summer Breeze" (Instrumental)				4:33
6.	"Do-ki-do-ki ~Jitensha ni Notte~" (Instrumental)				4:07

=== Charts ===
Chart (2003)	Peak position
Japanese Oricon Singles Chart	50

== Other cover versions ==
- Rita Coolidge covered the song in English as "Rain" in her 1991 album Dancing with an Angel.
- Taiwanese singer Ma Tsui-ju covered the song in Chinese as "Bùnéng yuàn nǐ zhǐ néng yuàn zìjǐ" (不能怨你只能怨自己; "You Cannot Blame Anyone but Yourself") in her 1991 album Shénme yàng de ài nǐ cái huì dǒng (什麼樣的愛你才會懂; What Kind of Love Will You Understand?).
- Cantopop singer Cecilia Tam covered the song as "Yǔzhōng de bàoyōng" (雨中的抱擁; "An Embrace in the Rain") in her 1991 album Zhōngyú zhǎodào LOVE (終於找到LOVE; I Finally Found Love).
- Cantopop singer Elaine Ho covered the song as "Yè shēn yǔzhōng" (夜深雨中; "Deep Rain in the Night") in her 1992 album Elaine.
- Springs covered the song in their 2003 compilation Springs Super Best.
- Yui Ichikawa covered the song in 2003.
- Miku Ueno covered the song in 2003.
- Ceyren covered the song in 2006.
- Runa Miyoshida covered the song in her 2007 cover album pure flavor #1〜color of love〜.
- Anri covered the song in her 2007 cover album Tears of Anri.
- Miu Nakamura covered the song in her 2008 album Stand My Ground.
- Chikako Sawada covered the song in her 2009 album Utahime Monogatari.
- Junichi Inagaki recorded a duet with Moritaka in his 2009 cover album Otoko to On'na 2 -Two Hearts Two Voices-.
- Ms. Ooja covered the song in her 2011 single "Cry Day...".
- Yūzō Imai covered the song in his 2010 cover album Kimi to Aruita Jikan.
- Cute (with Maimi Yajima on vocals) covered the song in Limited Editions A-B of their 2013 single "Kono Machi".

== See also ==
- 1990 in Japanese music
