= Benkyō no Uta =

1991 song by Chisato Moritaka

Single by Chisato Moritaka

from the album The Moritaka
- Language: Japanese
- English title: Study Song
- A-side: "Kono Machi (Home Mix)"
- Released: February 10, 1991
- Recorded: 1990
- Genre: J-pop; dance-pop
- Length: 4:40
- Label: Warner Pioneer
- Composer: Hideo Saitō
- Lyricist: Chisato Moritaka
- Producer: Yukio Seto

Chisato Moritaka singles chronology
| "Ame" (1990) | "Benkyō no Uta" / "Kono Machi" (1991) | "Hachigatsu no Koi" (1991) |

Music video
- Benkyō no Uta on YouTube

"Benkyō no Uta" (勉強の歌; lit. "Study Song") is the 12th single by Japanese singer/songwriter Chisato Moritaka. The lyrics were written by Moritaka and the music was composed by Hideo Saitō, the single was released alongside "Kono Machi (Home Mix)" by Warner Pioneer on February 10, 1991. The song was used as the opening theme of the 1991 anime TV series The Twins at St. Clare's.

== Music video ==
The music video features Moritaka as a school teacher in a class of masked children.

== Chart performance ==
"Benkyō no Uta"/"Kono Machi" peaked at No. 4 on Oricon's singles chart and sold 184,000 copies. It was also certified Gold by the RIAJ in December 1992.

== Other versions ==
A remix of the song, titled "The Benkyō no Uta", is included in the 1991 remix album The Moritaka.

Moritaka re-recorded the song and uploaded the video on her YouTube channel on December 17, 2012. This version is also included in Moritaka's 2013 self-covers DVD album Love Vol. 3.

The song was remixed by tofubeats in the 2014 collaboration album Chisato Moritaka with tofubeats: Moritaka Tofu.

== Track listing ==
All lyrics are written by Chisato Moritaka; all music is composed and arranged by Hideo Saitō.

8 cm CD
| No. | Title | Length |
|---|---|---|
| 1. | "Benkyō no Uta" ((勉強の歌; lit. "Study Song")) | 4:40 |
| 2. | "Kono Machi (Home Mix)" ((この街; lit. "This Town")) | 4:44 |

Cassette
| No. | Title | Length |
|---|---|---|
| 1. | "Benkyō no Uta" |
| 2. | "Kono Machi (Home Mix)" |
| 3. | "Benkyō no Uta" (Karaoke) |
| 4. | "Kono Machi (Home Mix)" (Karaoke) |

== Personnel ==
- Chisato Moritaka – vocals
- Hideo Saitō – all instruments, programming
- Yuichi Takahashi – backing vocals
- Seiji Matsuura – backing vocals

== Charts ==
| Chart (1991) | Peak position |
|---|---|
| Japanese Oricon Singles Chart | 4 |

== Certification ==
| Region | Certification | Certified units/sales |
|---|---|---|
| Japan (RIAJ) | Gold | 200,000^{^} |
^{^} Shipments figures based on certification alone.
