= Fight!! (song) =

1991 song by Chisato Moritaka

Single by Chisato Moritaka

from the album Rock Alive
- Language: Japanese
- B-side: "Hitori Kurashi"
- Released: October 25, 1991
- Recorded: 1991
- Genre: J-pop; pop rock
- Length: 4:58
- Label: Warner Music Japan
- Composer: Yuichi Takahashi
- Lyricist: Chisato Moritaka
- Producer: Yukio Seto

Chisato Moritaka singles chronology
"Hachigatsu no Koi" (1991)	"Fight!!" (1991)	"Concert no Yoru" (1992)

Music videos
- "Fight!!" on YouTube

"Fight!!" (ファイト!!, Faito) is the 14th single by Japanese singer/songwriter Chisato Moritaka. The lyrics were written by Moritaka and the music was composed by Yuichi Takahashi. The single was released by Warner Music Japan on October 25, 1991. The '70s-style rock song was used as an image song for the 1991 FIVB Volleyball Men's World Cup, which was held in Tokyo.

== Chart performance ==
"Fight!!" peaked at No. 10 on Oricon's singles chart and sold 269,000 copies, being certified Gold by the RIAJ.

== Other versions ==
Moritaka re-recorded the song as a slow ballad and uploaded the video on her YouTube channel on September 24, 2012. This version is also included in Moritaka's 2013 self-covers DVD album Love Vol. 2.

== Track listing ==
All lyrics are written by Chisato Moritaka.

8 cm CD
No.	Title	Music	Arrangement	Length
1.	"Fight!!" (Faito!! (ファイト!!))	Yuichi Takahashi	Takahashi	4:58
2.	"Hitori Kurashi" ((ひとり暮らし; lit. "Living Alone"))	Hideo Saitō	Saitō	4:14

Cassette
No.	Title	Music	Arrangement	Length
1.	"Fight!!"	Takahashi	Takahashi
2.	"Hitori Kurashi"	Saitō	Saitō
3.	"Fight!!" (Karaoke)
4.	"Hitori Kurashi" (Karaoke)

== Personnel ==
- Chisato Moritaka – vocals
- Yuichi Takahashi – keyboards, synthesizer programming, acoustic guitar, backing vocals
- Yasuaki Maejima – piano
- Hiroyoshi Matsuo – acoustic guitar
- Hideo Saitō – synthesizer programming, backing vocals

== Charts ==
Chart (1991)	Peak position
Japanese Oricon Singles Chart	10

== Certification ==
Region	Certification	Certified units/sales
Japan (RIAJ)	Gold	200,000^{^}
^{^} Shipments figures based on certification alone.
