= Concert no Yoru =

1992 song by Chisato Moritaka

Single by Chisato Moritaka

from the album Rock Alive
- Language: Japanese
- English title: Concert Night
- B-side: "Zoku Aru OL no no Seishun ~A-ko no Baai~"
- Released: February 25, 1992
- Recorded: 1991
- Genre: J-pop; pop rock
- Length: 4:46
- Label: Warner Music Japan
- Composer: Hideo Saitō
- Lyricist: Chisato Moritaka
- Producer: Yukio Seto

Chisato Moritaka singles chronology
"Fight!!" (1992)	"Concert no Yoru" (1992)	"Watashi ga Obasan ni Natte mo" (1992)

Music videos
- "Concert no Yoru" on YouTube

"Concert no Yoru" (コンサートの夜, Konsāto no Yoru; lit. "Concert Night") is the 15th single by Japanese singer/songwriter Chisato Moritaka. Written by Moritaka and Hideo Saitō, the single was released by Warner Music Japan on February 25, 1992.

== Chart performance ==
"Concert no Yoru" peaked at No. 7 on Oricon's singles chart and sold 104,000 copies.

== Other versions ==
Moritaka re-recorded the song and uploaded the video on her YouTube channel on September 22, 2012. This version is also included in Moritaka's 2013 self-covers DVD album Love Vol. 2.

== Track listing ==
All lyrics are written by Chisato Moritaka; all music is composed and arranged by Hideo Saitō.

8 cm CD
No.	Title	Length
1.	"Concert no Yoru" (Konsāto no Yoru (コンサートの夜; Concert Night"))	4:46
2.	"Zoku Aru OL no no Seishun ~A-ko no Baai~ (Moritaka Connection)" (Zoku Aru Ō Ēru no Seishun ~ Ē-ko no Baai ~ (Moritaka Konekushon) (続・あるOLの青春〜A子の場合〜（Moritaka Connection）; "Continuation: A Certain Young Office Lady ~ In the case of Child A ~ (Moritaka Connection)"))	4:39

Cassette
No.	Title	Length
1.	"Concert no Yoru"
2.	"Zoku Aru OL no no Seishun ~A-ko no Baai~ (Moritaka Connection)"
3.	"Concert no Yoru" (Karaoke)
4.	"Zoku Aru OL no no Seishun ~A-ko no Baai~ (Moritaka Connection)" (Karaoke)

== Personnel ==
- Chisato Moritaka – vocals
- Hideo Saitō – all instruments, programming, backing vocals
- Seiji Matsuura – backing vocals

== Charts ==
Chart (1992)	Peak position
Japanese Oricon Singles Chart	7
