= My Favorites =

Compilation album by Chisato Moritaka
- Released: November 26, 2004
- Recorded: 1990–2004
- Genre: J-pop; pop rock
- Length: 74:27
- Language: Japanese
- Label: Zetima
- Producer: Yukio Seto

Chisato Moritaka chronology
Harvest Time (1999)	My Favorites (2004)	The Singles (2012)

My Favorites (マイ フェイバリッツ, Mai Feibarittsu) is a compilation album by Japanese singer-songwriter Chisato Moritaka. It was released on November 26, 2004, five years after she retired from the music industry. The album features songs selected by Moritaka herself, including a chorus and drum re-recording of the song "Dotchi mo Dotchi". Instead of one booklet, My Favorites includes two mini-booklets: one with liner notes and the other with lyrics.

The album peaked at No. 71 on Oricon's albums chart and sold over 7,000 copies.

== Track listing ==
All lyrics are written by Chisato Moritaka; all music is arranged by Yuichi Takahshi, except where indicated.

No.	Title	Music	Arrangement	Length
1.	"Dotchi mo Dotchi (Mrs. Moritaka Version 2004)" ((どっちもどっち (ミセス森高バージョン2004); "Whichever (Mrs. Moritaka Version 2004)"))	Yuichi Takahashi	Moritaka	5:22
2.	"Ame" ((雨; "Rain"))	Seiji Matsuura	Hideo Saitō	5:03
3.	"Kono Machi" ((この街; "This Town"))	Saitō	Saitō	4:39
4.	"Obasan" ((叔母さん; "Aunt"))	Hiromasa Ijichi	Saitō	5:44
5.	"Rock 'n' Roll Kenchōshozaichi" (Rokkunrōru Kenchōshozaichi (ロックンロール県庁所在地; Rock 'n' Roll Prefectural Government))	Moritaka	Moritaka	2:29
6.	"Aoi Umi" ((青い海; "The Blue Sea"))	Hiroyoshi Matsuo	Matsuo	4:27
7.	"Watarasebashi" ((渡良瀬橋; "Watarase Bridge"))	Saitō	Saitō	3:46
8.	"Ichido Asobi ni Kite yo" ((一度遊びに来てよ; "Come Out and Play"))	Saitō	Saitō	5:05
9.	"Kyō kara" ((今日から; "Starting Today"))	Takahashi		4:26
10.	"Gin Gin Gin"	Moritaka		2:37
11.	"Dekiru Desho!!" ((出来るでしょ！！; "You Can Do It!!"))	Ijichi		4:31
12.	"Tō ga Tatsu" ((薹が立つ; "Past Her Prime"))	Ijichi		3:22
13.	"Let's Go!"	Ijichi		4:23
14.	"Tony Slavin"	Moritaka		4:37
15.	"Snow Again"	Takahashi		4:25
16.	"Nagasarete..." ((流されて・・・; "Washed Away..."))	Takahashi		4:36
17.	"Watashi no Yō ni" ((私のように; "Like Me"))	Shin Kōno	Kōno	5:02
Total length:				74:27

== Personnel ==
- Chisato Moritaka – vocals, drums (1)
- Yuichi Takahashi – guitar, programming (1)
- Shin Hashimoto – piano (1)
- Yukio Seto – bass (1)
- Tatsuya Maruyama – viola, strings arrangement (1)
- Daisuke Inobe – viola (1)
- Masami Horisawa – cello (1)
- Ayano Kasahara – cello (1)

== Charts ==
Chart (2004)	Peak position
Japanese Albums (Oricon)	71
