= Wotagei =

Dancing and cheering by fans of Japanese idol singers

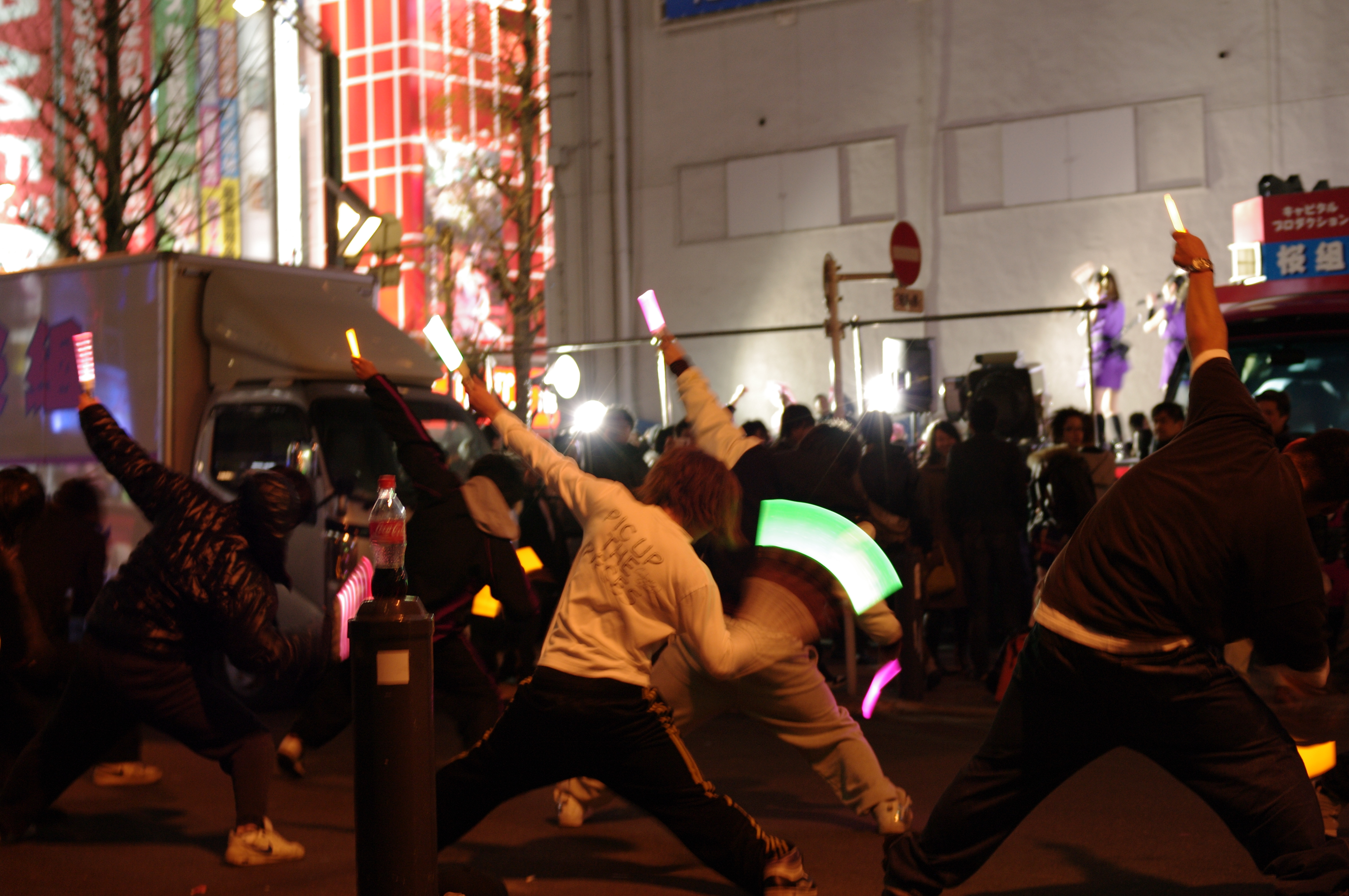
Fans performing wotagei in Akihabara, Tokyo

Wotagei (ヲタ芸), also known as otagei (オタ芸), is a type of dancing and cheering gestures performed by wota, fans of Japanese idol singers (and thus seen as Akiba-kei), involving jumping, clapping, arm-waving and chanting slogans. Wotagei is performed at concerts, or at events such as anime and manga conventions and meetings of idol fan groups, and it is thought to have developed from the ōendan, organised cheering squads common at sporting events in Japan. Wotagei is particularly associated with fans of Hello! Project, AKB48, and Vocaloid idols including Hatsune Miku, as well as fans of anime and game voice actresses (seiyuu), who often perform theme songs for the series in which they appear.

== Terminology ==
Japanese idol fans are known as wota (ヲタ), a respelling of otaku (オタク) adopted to distinguish themselves from otaku generally, and the term otagei is itself a contraction of "the art of idol otaku" (アイドルオタクの芸, aidoru otaku no gei), which originally represented the acts of cheering and support they would do at idol concerts. The movement side of it, performed while holding glow sticks or penlights, also came to be distinguished by its spelling wotagei (ヲタ芸) vs. otagei (オタ芸).

A wota who performs wotagei using glow sticks is known as an uchishi (打ち師), from the verb utsu (打つ). Because these movements require a certain amount of space, it is common for them to be performed towards the back of live music venues. The performances are composed of multiple named techniques, e.g. thundersnake (サンダースネーク), rosario (ロザリオ), amaterasu (アマテラス) and muramasa (ムラマサ), which are combined to fit within a song's structure as a choreography.

Performances using glow sticks and penlights are also known as cyalume dance (サイリウムダンス), sometimes abbreviated sairi dansu (サイリダンス). According to the Japanese pop culture site KAI-YOU, cyalume dance originated from the wotagei that fans performed while holding cyalume at idol concerts, though some people treat wotagei and cyalume dance as distinct practices.

== History ==
Fans have been shouting the names of female idols (calls) since at least the time of Mari Amachi in the early 1970s. Wotagei itself originated with shin'eitai cheering groups for idols around the 1970s and 1980s, whose members shouted calls in unison in time with the music and attended every concert and public appearance of the performers they followed.

The practice of MIX, the specific pattern of calls during intros and instrumental breaks, started at idol venues around 1993. This would later spread to AKB48 events where it became established amongst fans.

Miki Fujimoto's 2002 single Romantic Ukare Mode became the song most associated with wotagei, and also contained a sequence of wotagei elements: dogeza, calls, mawari, romance, and dash kecha. On May 2, 2004, in between the afternoon and evening performances of the final day of a Morning Musume tour at Saitama Super Arena, an estimated 100 to 200 people performed wotagei to the song at Keyaki Hiroba outside the venue, and this footage became widespread. Performing the full sequence for the song is not really possible at seated venues, as the sliding romeo literally involves sliding across the ground. But since it can also be done without a singer as long as there is music, people also did this outside venues, at DJ events, or during karaoke.

Wotagei as a term began appearing in mainstream press around mid-2006, and people started uploading recordings to YouTube and Niconico Douga, both of which spread wotagei to a wider audience. Wotagei also started appearing outside concerts. In September 2010, at the Hajisai festival in Kuki, Saitama, around fifty people did otagei in a space set aside for them next to a stage where performers from DearStage appeared, to a set that included songs from anime series such as Macross Frontier and Gurren Lagann. More than 500 people gathered to watch, with some clapping along or joining in. The organizers described the otagei performers as the de facto main attraction on that day. In February 2011, at the Taipei International Game Show, audience members performing wotagei below one of the stages drew attention after a video of them circulated online. The most prominent of them became known as 戰鬥哥 (Zhàndòu Gē), and in 2021 a Taiwanese wotagei group marked the tenth anniversary by inviting him to perform with them.

More than two decades later, people still perform wotagei to Romantic Ukare Mode at Hello! Project members' birthday events as well as Fujimoto's solo concerts. As recently as March 2024, a group of fans performed it in the studio on the TV program Shabekuri 007 while Fujimoto sang.

== Professional activity ==
In the 2010s, wotagei began developing into its own performance distinct from audience participation. This practice spread through the custom of sharing self-recordings and was also supported commercially by the glow stick and penlight manufacturer Lumica.

GinyuforcE, originally formed in 2009 as Ginyu Tokusentai (ギニュ～特戦隊), were described as pioneers of cyalume dance. According to KAI-YOU, they built wotagei into a culture and began spreading cyalume dance worldwide through YouTube and other places. They also appeared on Japanese TV at least five times between 2012 and 2017, as well as in a Kirin Hyoketsu commercial featuring the actor Issey Takahashi, which KAI-YOU suggests changed how some people saw wotagei. The group announced it would disband in January 2024 and their final performance was at Shibuya GRACE BALI on May 4, 2024.

They also released two commercial instructional DVDs. The Wotagei was released in January 2013 on the Full Moon label under the Ginyu Tokusentai name, directed by Keitan of Real Akiba Boyz. In August 2019, Wotagei/Cyalume Dance Lesson Video Kiwami was released by C-works under the GinyuforcE name. It also included showcases from the wotagei teams JKz and Fly-N.

=== Cyalume Dance World Battle ===
The first Cyalume Dance World Battle (CDWB) was held in 2018, organized by GinyuforcE and Lumica, with qualifying rounds in eight cities across Asia and North America and the final was held at Kanda Myōjin Hall on January 19, 2019. The second CDWB had qualifiers in ten cities, with the final at the same venue on December 22, 2019. A third event, planned for January 23, 2021, was ultimately canceled because of the COVID-19 pandemic.

In October 2019, Cyalume Dance received a Minister of Education, Culture, Sports, Science and Technology Award in the arts and education field, nominated through the Cyalume Dance World Battle.

=== Other groups and events ===
Kita no Uchishitachi (北の打ち師達), a duo based in Hokkaido active since November 2010, was also one of the earliest to build an audience through their wotagei videos and reached one million subscribers in 2019. Fly-N, a team based in Nagoya and signed to METEORA st., also passed one million YouTube subscribers in 2023.

Zero-uchi Restart (ゼロから打ち師始めます。), formed in October 2018, appeared in a Suntory commercial, were guests at Anime Expo 2024, and were in a ticketed cyalume dance experience in Shinjuku aimed at tourists from overseas. In March 2026, with over 11 million followers across social media, they released the single "Romance Alert: Order Received!" through Universal Music, billed as the first song written specifically for wotagei.

The Wotagei Association (一般社団法人ヲタ芸協会), a general incorporated association, has also been running Wotagei Kōshien (ヲタ芸甲子園) since 2024, a national school-level competition for wotagei and cyalume dance.

== Styles ==
Latte, a former member of GinyuforcE, has described wotagei as having two styles: cyalume-gei, which uses light trails from glow sticks or penlights, and chikagei, which uses the whole body instead, pursuing movement that fits the music. He says they are very different styles with a shared root that occasionally borrow from each other, so some techniques share names but differ in their movements. He created a video with the chikagei player Oseron to demonstrate the differences between the styles. Shinra of Wotagei Machine, another chikagei player, says chikagei players mainly perform at anison club events, known as anikura.

== Techniques ==
Wotagei generally has techniques that are tied around different sections of a song. The intro and instrumentals often feature MIX and kecha. During the A-melody (verse), OAD and ni-hai-o-hai are used. During the B-melody (pre-chorus), rosario and PPPH are often used. Techniques mainly used in the chorus include thundersnake, muramasa, amaterasu, and mawari, with romance typically closing the section out. Thundersnake, muramasa and romance are taught as the basic chorus techniques. These chorus techniques are also the basis of cyalume dance, whose performers combine them to fit a song as a kind of choreography.

Many techniques outside the chorus are built around claps or calls. PPPH is named for its rhythm of claps and call: "Pan, papan, hyu!" Kecha was adapted from the Indonesian kecak, and is sometimes performed in quiet passages. OAD, short for "over action dolphin", involves swinging the body side to side while clapping. Rosario involves crossing the arms then swinging them down, and romance swings the body side to side like OAD while pointing upward.

Some techniques are associated with specific communities, such as yellow panchos, a variant of romance performed mainly at DearStage venues or associated acts, and raion blade, known for being performed at the shows of RYUKYU IDOL, a local idol group from Okinawa.

== MIX ==
MIX is a type of patterned call generally used during intros and instrumental breaks. There are three basic versions, English (standard version), Japanese, and Ainu, beginning with "tiger", tora (虎) and chape respectively. The full English MIX is "Tiger! Fire! Cyber! Fiber! Diver! Viber! Jā-jā!" They can also be chained together, and doing all three in succession is known as sanren (三連). Which MIX is used and where depends on the song, and the MIXes can vary, such as being doubled up in speed or shortened, or having variations like the two common Ainu versions. Some idol groups have their own MIX variants. Some songs even incorporate MIX and other calls into their lyrics, such as Nippon Wachacha's "Call Can You Say It to the End?" and iLiFE!'s "Idol Life Starter Pack".

== See also ==
- Crowd surfing
- Stage diving
- Moshing, a comparable crowd behavior on a punk rock or heavy metal music
- Shin'eitai
