= 1st GAM: Amai Yuwaku =

- Front cover of regular edition.

Studio album by GAM
- Released: May 23, 2007
- Recorded: 2007
- Genre: Japanese pop
- Length: TBA
- Label: Hachama
- Producer: Tsunku

1st GAM: Amai Yuwaku (1st GAM～甘い誘惑～, 1st GAM: Sweet Seduction) is the first studio album of Hello! Project duo GAM, released on May 23, 2007. It contains GAM's first three singles and a remix of their first single "Thanks!".

There are two editions of the album: a limited edition and a regular edition. The limited edition includes a DVD containing an alternate version of the music video for "Lu Lu Lu" and a making-of footage, while the regular edition comes with three photocards available only on its first pressing: one of Aya Matsuura, another for Miki Fujimoto, and the third one with both members.

== GAM's demand ==
On the 2007 concert tour of Hello! Project (named ThePPN:Hello! Project 2007 Winter: Shuuketsu! 10th Anniversary), GAM emceed one of the three emcee segments. During their segment, Aya Matsuura told their audience about her desire for a GAM concert. Miki Fujimoto, on the other hand, explained that before they could organize a concert they should have more original songs; she later concluded that she wanted an album. Eventually, Tsunku and Up-Front Works Co. Ltd. listened and later approved their requests—the album was released on May 23, while the concert took place three days after the album's release. The album was originally expected to have nine songs; but for some unknown reasons, the number of tracks on the list changed to eleven.

== Production ==
On the April 16, 2007 episode of Fujimoto's radio show DokiMiki Night, she confessed that there is more recording to be done in the album. Due to the tight and conflicting schedules of both members, they have to record their parts at different sessions. However, the duo managed to finish the recordings without any problems due to their chemistry, which was influenced by their long-time friendship.

On May 2, the album covers were publicly released in Japan; a commercial was also released to advertise the album. On May 5, radio previews of "Ai no Fune," "Icha♡icha Summer," "Aijō Oasis," and "Amai Yūwaku" had emerged; another preview surfaced but its title was unknown.

On May 17, another cover was released to the public—the cover for the limited edition DVD. The following day, the Oricon Charts released a poll of which albums would sell more through the Ninki Rankings. The company randomly asked 400 people off the streets what releases they know about releasing the following week or which ones they're going to buy. The album ranked #4 with 27.4%.

== Post-release ==
Simultaneous with the album's release on May 23, Oricon Charts published in their official website a special interview article of the group. The two talked about the album and later exclaimed that its theme is "freedom". Later that day, the album debuted on the daily album charts, taking the #4 spot.

== Track listing ==
All lyrics written by Tsunku.

1. Thanks!
2. Junketsu: Only (純潔～Only～, Purity: Only)
3. Melodies (メロディーズ)
4. Ai no Fune (愛の船, Love Boat)
5. Koko de Kisu Shite (ここで キスして, Kiss Me Here)
6. Lu Lu Lu
7. Icha icha Summer (イチャ♡イチャ Summer, Flirting in the Summer)
8. Aijō Oasis (愛情オアシス, Love Oasis)
9. ...H
10. Amai Yūwaku (甘い誘惑, Sweet Seduction)
11. Thanks! Yūwaku Remix (Thanks! 誘惑Remix, Thanks! Seduction Remix)

=== Bonus DVD (Limited Edition only) ===
1. Melodies (Aya version)
2. Melodies (Miki version)
3. Lu Lu Lu (Dance Shot version)

== Personnel ==
- Aya Matsuura – vocals
- Miki Fujimoto – vocals
- Masafumi Nashida – arranger (tracks 1 and 11)
- Hideyuki "Daichi" Suzuki – arranger (tracks 2, 7, and 10)
- Kaoru Ōkubu – arranger (tracks 3 and 6)
- Kōichi Yuasa – arranger (track 4)
- Shōichirō Hirata – arranger (tracks 5 and 9)
- Yuichi Takahashi – arranger (track 8)

== Charts ==
Release	Chart	Peak position
May 23, 2007	Oricon Daily Album Chart	4
May 23, 2007	Oricon Weekly Album Chart	12
