= Ai no Sono (Touch My Heart!) =

Single by Morning Musume Otomegumi
- Released: September 18, 2003 (CD); October 16, 2003 (Single V)
- Recorded: 2003
- Genre: Japanese pop; synthpop; dance-pop
- Label: Zetima; EPCE-5233; EPBE-5094 (Single V)
- Songwriter: Tsunku
- Producer: Tsunku

Morning Musume Otomegumi singles chronology
"Ai no Sono (Touch My Heart!)" (2003)	"Yūjō: Kokoro no Busu ni wa Naranee!" (2004)

"Ai no Sono (Touch My Heart!)" (愛の園 ～Touch My Heart!～, Ai no Sono ~Tatchi Mai Hāto~; Garden of Love: Touch My Heart!) is the first single of the J-pop idol group Morning Musume subgroup Morning Musume Otomegumi. In addition to the title song and its karaoke version, the single also contains a Morning Musume Otomegumi version of the earlier Morning Musume song "Dekkai Uchū ni Ai ga Aru", which was originally a b-side on the single "The Peace!". Morning Musume Sakuragumi also did a version of "Dekkai Uchū ni Ai ga Aru" at the same time as Morning Musume Otomegumi on the "Hare Ame Nochi Suki" single.

== Track listing ==
All songs are written and composed by Tsunku and are arranged by Suzuki Shunsuke.

=== CD ===
1. "Ai no Sono (Touch My Heart!)" (愛の園 ～Touch My Heart!～)
2. "Dekkai Uchū ni Ai ga Aru (Morning Musume Otomegumi Version)" (でっかい宇宙に愛がある(モーニング娘。おとめ組 Version))
3. "Ai no Sono (Touch My Heart!)" (Instrumental)

=== Single V DVD ===
1. "Ai no Sono: Touch My Heart"
2. "Ai no Sono (Touch My Heart!) (Tsuki no Otome Version)" (愛の園 ～Touch My Heart!～ (月夜のおとめ Version))
3. "Making Of" (メイキング映像)

== Members at the time of single ==
- 1st generation: Kaori Iida
- 4th generation: Rika Ishikawa, Nozomi Tsuji
- 5th generation: Makoto Ogawa
- 6th generation: Miki Fujimoto, Sayumi Michishige, Reina Tanaka

== Musical personnel ==
- Kaori Iida – vocals
- Rika Ishikawa – vocals
- Nozomi Tsuji – vocals
- Makoto Ogawa – vocals
- Miki Fujimoto – vocals
- Sayumi Michishige – vocals
- Reina Tanaka – vocals
- Tsunku – composer, background vocals
- Suzuki Shunsuke – arranger

== Charts ==
Release	Chart	Peak position	Chart run
September 18, 2003	Oricon Daily Singles Chart	2nd rank	20 days
September 18, 2003	Oricon Weekly Singles Chart	3rd rank	8 weeks
September 18, 2003	CDTV Weekly Top 100 Singles Chart	3rd rank	6 weeks

== Performances ==
=== In television shows ===
- 2003-09-25 – Utaban

=== In concerts ===
Concert title	Filming date	Release
Hello! Project 2004 Winter ~C'MON! Dance World~ (Hello! Project 2004Winter ～C'MON! ダンスワールド～)	2004-01-03 to 2004-01-25	2004-03-17
Morning Musume Otome Gumi Hatsukouen ~Otomechikku~ (モーニング娘。おとめ組～おとめチック～)	2004-03-20	2004-06-09]
Morning Musume Concert Tour 2004 Haru The Best of Japan (モーニング娘。CONCERT TOUR 2004 春 The BEST of Japan)	-	2004-07-14
Melon Kinenbi Live Tour 2004 Natsu ~Gokujou Melon~ (メロン記念日ライブツアー 2004夏 ～極上メロン～)	2004-08-15	2004-11-26
Hello! Project 2005 Winter All-Stars Dairanbu ~A Happy New Power! Iida Kaori Sotsugyo Special~ (Hello! Project 2005 Winter オールスターズ大乱舞 ～A HAPPY NEW POWER! 飯田圭織卒業スペシャル～)	2005-01-29 to 2005-01-30	2005-03-16
Hello Pro Party! 2006 ~Goto Maki Captain Kouen~ (ハロ☆プロパーティ～！2006～後藤真希キャプテン公演～)	2006-04-16	2006-07-05
Hello! Project Tour Winter 2007 ~Wonderful Hearts Otome Gokoro~ (Hello! Project 2007 Winter ～ワンダフルハーツ 乙女 Gocoro～)	2007-01-02 to 2007-01-21	TBR
