= Boyfriend (Miki Fujimoto song) =

Single by Miki Fujimoto

from the album MIKI 1
- Released: 7 November 2002(JP)
- Recorded: 2002
- Genre: J-pop
- Length: 14:20
- Label: hachama
- Producer(s): Tsunku

Miki Fujimoto singles chronology
"Romantic Ukare Mode" (2002)	"Boyfriend" (2002)	"Boogie Train '03" (2003)

"Boyfriend" (ボーイフレンド) is the fourth single released by Miki Fujimoto. It was released on 7 November 2002 and went on to sell a total of 43,200 copies, peaking at number four on the Oricon charts.

== Track listing ==
1. Boyfriend (ボーイフレンド, Bōifurendo)
2. Osananajimi (幼なじみ)
3. Boyfriend (ボーイフレンド, Bōifurendo) (Instrumental)
