= Yūjō (Kokoro no Busu ni wa Naranee!) =

Single by Morning Musume Otomegumi
- Released: February 25, 2004 (JP)
- Genre: J-pop; dance-pop
- Label: Zetima
- Producer: Tsunku

Morning Musume Otomegumi singles chronology
"Ai no Sono: Touch My Heart!" (2003)	"Yūjō (Kokoro no Busu ni wa Naranee!)" (2004)

"Yūjō (Kokoro no Busu ni wa Naranee!)" (友情 ～心のブスにはならねぇ!～; "Friendship: I Won't Become Ugly on the Inside!") is the last single of the J-pop idol group Morning Musume subgroup Morning Musume Otomegumi. In addition to the title song and its karaoke version, the single also contains Morning Musume Otomegumi versions of the earlier Morning Musume songs "Say Yeah!: Motto Miracle Night" and "Summer Night Town". "Say Yeah!: Motto Miracle Night" was originally featured on the Best! Morning Musume 1 album and "Summer Night Town" was originally featured on the "Summer Night Town" single. Morning Musume Sakuragumi also released another version of "Say Yeah!: Motto Miracle Night" at the same time on the "Sakura Mankai" single.

== Track listing ==
The lyricist and composer of the songs is Tsunku. Both "Yūjō ~Kokoro no Busu ni wa Naranee!~" and the Otomegumi version of "Summer Night Town" was arranged by Suzuki Shunsuke. On the other hand, the Otomegumi version of "Say Yeah! ~Motto Miracle Night~" was arranged by Konoshi Takao.

=== CD ===
1. "Yūjō (Kokoro no Busu ni wa Naranee!)" (友情 ～心のブスにはならねぇ!～)
2. "Say Yeah!: Motto Miracle Night (Morning Musume Otomegumi Version)" (Say Yeah!: もっとミラクルナイト (モーニング娘。おとめ組Version))
3. "Summer Night Town (Morning Musume Otomegumi Version)" (サマーナイトタウン(モーニング娘。おとめ組Version))
4. "Yūjō (Kokoro no Busu ni wa Naranee!)" (Instrumental)

=== Single V DVD ===
The DVD also features the two version of Morning Musume Sakuragumi's "Sakura Mankai" music videos.

2. "Yūjō (Kokoro no Busu ni wa Naranee!)"
4. "Yūjō (Kokoro no Busu ni wa Naranee!) (Oi! Oi! Version)"

== Members at time of single ==
- 1st generation: Kaori Iida
- 4th generation: Rika Ishikawa, Nozomi Tsuji
- 5th generation: Makoto Ogawa
- 6th generation: Miki Fujimoto, Sayumi Michishige, Reina Tanaka

== Personnel ==
- Tsunku – composer, background vocals
- Suzuki Shunsuke – arranger (tracks 1 and 3)
- Konoshi Takao – arranger (track 2)

== Chart positions ==
Chart	Peak position	Chart run
Oricon Daily Singles Chart	#2	7 days
Oricon Weekly Singles Chart	#5	6 weeks
CDTV Weekly Top 100 Singles Chart	#6	4 weeks

== Performances ==
=== Television ===
- February 16, 2004 – Hey! Hey! Hey! Music Champ
- March 4, 2004 – Utaban

=== Concerts ===
Concert title	Filming date	Release
Morning Musume Otomegumi Hatsukouen ~Otomechikku~ (モーニング娘。おとめ組～おとめチック～)	March 20, 2004	June 9, 2004
Morning Musume Concert Tour 2004 Haru The Best of Japan (モーニング娘。Concert Tour 2004春 The Best of Japan)	—	July 14, 2004
v-u-den First Concert Tour 2005 Haru ~v-u-densetsu~ (美勇伝 ファーストコンサートツアー2005春 ～美勇伝説～)	May 29, 2005	August 17, 2005
