= Mix Age =

Remix album by Chisato Moritaka
- Released: November 3, 1999
- Recorded: 1998–1999
- Length: 48:00
- Language: Japanese
- Label: Zetima
- Producer: Yukio Seto

Chisato Moritaka chronology
The Best Selection of First Moritaka 1987–1993 (1998)	Mix Age (1999)	harvest time (1999)

Singles from Mix Age
- 1. "Watashi no Yō ni" Released: March 17, 1999; 2. "Ichido Asobi ni Kite yo '99" Released: October 1, 1999

Mix Age Moritaka Chisato Rare Tracks and Remixes (also known simply as Mix Age; stylized as mix age* moritaka chisato rare tracks and remixes) is a remix album by Japanese singer-songwriter Chisato Moritaka, released on November 3, 1999, after her marriage to actor Yōsuke Eguchi on June 3 and her subsequent retirement from the music industry. The album features a selection of remixes of Moritaka's past hits.

The album peaked at No. 30 on Oricon's albums chart and sold over 15,000 copies.

== Track listing ==
All lyrics are written by Chisato Moritaka; all music is arranged by Yuichi Takahashi, except where indicated.

No.	Title	Music	Arrangement	Length
1.	"Snow Again (Snow Blink Re-Mix)"	Takahashi		4:41
2.	"Watashi no Yō ni (Naturals CM Slow Version)" ((私のように (ナチュラルズ CM SLOW Version); "Like Me (Naturals CM Slow Version)"))	Shin Kono		0:47
3.	"Watashi no Yō ni (Nazuna Re-Mix)" ((私のように (NAZUNA Re-Mix); "Like Me (Nazuna Re-Mix)"))	Kōno		5:49
4.	"Wasurekaketeta Yume (Nippon Life CM Version)" (Wasurekaketeta Yume (Nihonseimei CM Vājon) (忘れかけてた夢 (日本生命CM Version); "A Dream I Forgot (Nippon Life CM Version)"))	Takahashi		4:36
5.	"Ichido Asobi ni Kite yo '99" ((一度遊びに来てよ'99; "Come Out and Play '99"))	Hideo Saitō	Yasuaki Maejima	5:03
6.	"Sala Bossa Nova (Mukashi no Hito Wa... Re-Mix)" ((SALA BOSSA NOVA (むかしの人は‥Re-Mix); "Sala Bossa Nova (Once Upon a Time... Re-Mix)"))	Moritaka		3:41
7.	"Umi made 5-fun (Out Take)" (Umi made Go-fun (Auto Teiku) (海まで5分 (Out Take); "5 Minutes to the Sea (Out Take)"))	Toshinobu Kubota		4:23
8.	"Ame [1999]" ((雨[1999]; "Rain [1999]"))	Seiji Matsuura		5:05
9.	"Itsumo no Mise (Casar Re-Mix)" ((いつもの店 (CASAR Re-Mix); "The Usual Shop (Casar Re-Mix)"))	Takahashi		4:08
10.	"Kibun Sōkai (Out Take)" ((気分爽快 (Out Take); "Refreshing (Out Take)"))	Kenichi Kurosawa		3:57
11.	"Every Day (Album Version)"	Takahashi		5:44
Total length:				48:00

== Personnel ==
- Chisato Moritaka – vocals, loop drums (all tracks except 8 & 10), drums (10)
- Yuichi Takahashi – guitar (1, 4, 10, 12), synthesizer programming (1–4, 6–7, 9, 10, 12), backing vocals (10)
- Yukio Seto – guitar (2–4, 6, 8, 12), bass (4), wind chimes (4, 8), cowbell (4)
- Yasuaki Maejima – piano (4, 8), Fender Rhodes (5), keyboards (5), synthesizer programming (5)
- David T. Walker – guitar (5)
- Shin Kōno – piano (10)
- Masafumi Yokoyama – bass (10)

== Charts ==
Chart (1999)	Peak position
Japanese Albums (Oricon)	30
