= Hare Ame Nochi Suki =

Single by Morning Musume Sakuragumi
- B-side: "Dekkai Uchū ni Ai ga Aru"
- Released: 18 September 2003 (JP)
- Recorded: 2003
- Genre: J-pop
- Length: 14:11
- Label: Zetima
- Songwriters: Tsunku, Hideyuki "Daichi" Suzuki
- Producer: Tsunku

Morning Musume Sakuragumi singles chronology
"Hare Ame Nochi Suki" (2003)	"Sakura Mankai" (2004)

"Hare Ame Nochi Suki ♡" (晴れ 雨 のち スキ ♡, After the Rain, I'll Still Love You ♡) is the first single of the J-pop idol group Morning Musume subgroup Morning Musume Sakuragumi, released on September 18, 2003. In addition to the title song and its karaoke version, the single also contains Sakuragumi's version of "Dekkai Uchū ni Ai ga Aru", which was originally a B-side on Morning Musume single "The Peace!". Morning Musume Otomegumi also did a version of "Dekkai Uchū ni Ai ga Aru" at the same time as Morning Musume Sakuragumi on their first single, "Ai no Sono (Touch My Heart!)". The A-side features fellow Hello! Project member Atsuko Inaba on chorus.

The single was very successful, selling roughly 81,866 copies (6,495 copies more than Otomegumi's 1st single "Ai no Sono (Touch My Heart!)") and reaching Number 2 on the Oricon charts, charting for eight weeks.

== Track listings ==
=== CD ===
All lyrics are written by Tsunku.

No.	Title	Music	Length
1.	"Hare Ame Nochi Suki ♡" (晴れ 雨 のち スキ ♡, "After the Rain, I'll Still Love You ♡")	Hideyuki "Daichi" Suzuki	4:44
2.	"Dekkai Uchū ni Ai ga Aru (Morning Musume Sakuragumi Version)" (でっかい宇宙に愛がある (モーニング娘。さくら組Version), "There's Love in this Great Big Universe")	Yuichi Takahashi	4:41
3.	"Hare Ame Nochi Suki ♡ (Instrumental)"		4:46
Total length:			14:11

=== Single V DVD ===
No.	Title	Length
1.	"Hare Ame Nochi Suki"
2.	"Hare Ame Nochi Suki (Close-up Version)"
3.	"Making Of" (メイキング映像, Making eizō)

== Members at time of single ==
- 1st generation: Natsumi Abe
- 2nd generation: Mari Yaguchi
- 4th generation: Hitomi Yoshizawa, Ai Kago
- 5th generation: Ai Takahashi, Asami Konno, Risa Niigaki
- 6th generation: Eri Kamei
