= Omoi Afurete =

Omoi Afurete is Aya Matsuura's sixth studio album. It was released on January 21, 2009 by Zetima.

== Track listing ==
1. Kekkon Shinai Futari (結婚しない二人)
2. Nanakai Utau to Ii Koto ga Aru Uta (七回歌うといいことがある歌)
3. beautiful day
4. boomboomboom
5. Omoi Afurete (想いあふれて)
6. Rescue! Rescue! (レスキュー!レスキュー!)
7. Chuuou Kaisatsu (中央改札)
8. Shinju (真珠)
9. Fallin’
10. Kizuna (きずな)
