= Sotto Kuchizukete Gyutto Dakishimete =

Single by Miki Fujimoto

from the album MIKI 1
- Released: June 12, 2002(JP)
- Recorded: 2002
- Genre: J-pop
- Length: 11:33
- Label: hachama
- Producer(s): Tsunku

Miki Fujimoto singles chronology
"Aenai Nagai Nichiyoubi" (2002)	"Sotto Kuchizukete Gyutto Dakishimete" (2002)	"Romantic Ukare Mode" (2002)

"Sotto Kuchizukete Gyutto Dakishimete" (そっと口づけて ギュッと抱きしめて) is the second single from Japanese pop singer Miki Fujimoto and was released on June 12, 2002. It sold a total of 40,450 copies, peaking at number four on the Oricon charts.

== Track listing ==
1. Sotto Kuchizukete Gyutto Dakishimete (そっと口づけて ギュッと抱きしめて)
2. Koi Yo! Utsukushiku (恋よ！美しく)
3. Sotto Kuchizukete Gyutto Dakishimete (そっと口づけて ギュッと抱きしめて) (Instrumental)
