= Thanks! (GAM song) =

Single by GAM

from the album 1st GAM: Amai Yuwaku
- Released: September 13, 2006 (JP)
- Recorded: 2006
- Genre: Japanese Pop
- Length: 11:58
- Label: Hachama
- Songwriter(s): Tsunku
- Producer(s): Tsunku

GAM singles chronology
| "Thanks!" (2006) | "Melodies" (2006) |

"Thanks!" is the debut single of Hello! Project duo GAM. It is also the ending theme for the movie Sukeban Deka: Codename = Asamiya Saki, starring Aya Matsuura. The b-side, Shinkirō Romance (蜃気楼ロマンス), was also used as a filler track in the same movie.

The single was released on the Hachama label September 13, 2006 with a catalog entry of HKCN-50037. It debuted on the Oricon Daily Ranking singles chart at number 2, and finished with the weekly rank of number 5.

The Single V DVD containing the music video was released on September 20, 2006, with a catalog number of HKBN-50073.

== Track listings ==
=== CD ===
1. Thanks!
2. Shinkirō Romance (蜃気楼ロマンス, Shinkirō Romansu)
3. Thanks! (Instrumental)

=== Single V DVD ===
1. Thanks!
2. Thanks! (Close Up Version)
3. Making of (メイキング映像, Meikingu Eizō)
