= Chocolate Damashii =

Single by Aya Matsuura
- B-side: "Gatsun"
- Released: February 11, 2009
- Genre: Japanese pop
- Length: 14:17
- Label: Zetima
- Songwriter: Taiyō Yamazawa
- Lyricist: Yoshiko Miura

Aya Matsuura singles chronology
"Kizuna" (2008)	"Chocolate Damashii" (2009)	"Futari Osaka" (2011)

"Chocolate Damashii" (チョコレート魂, Chokorēto Damashī; "Chocolate Spirit") is the 21st single from Aya Matsuura, and her last single as part of Hello! Project. It was released on February 11, 2009 under the Zetima label, meant to be a Valentine's Day's gift. Video for the song was released on DVD as 'Single V' on February 25, 2009.

== Track listing ==
=== CD ===
1. "Chocolate Damashii" (チョコレート魂)
2. "Gatsun" (ガツン)
3. "Chocolate Damashii" (Instrumental)

=== DVD ===
1. "Chocolate Damashii"
2. "Chocolate Damashii (Sweet Ayaya ver.)"
3. Making of (メイキング映像)
