= Sakura Mankai =

Single by Morning Musume Sakuragumi
- Released: 25 February 2004
- Genre: J-pop
- Label: zetima
- Producer: Tsunku

Morning Musume Sakuragumi singles chronology
"Hare Ame Nochi Suki" (2003)	"Sakura Mankai" (2004)

"Sakura Mankai" (さくら満開, Cherry Blossoms in Full Bloom) is the second single of the J-pop idol group Morning Musume sub-group Morning Musume Sakuragumi. In addition to the title song and its karaoke version, the single also contains Morning Musume Sakuragumi versions of the earlier Morning Musume songs "Say Yeah!: Motto Miracle Night" and "Daite Hold on Me!". "Say Yeah!: Motto Miracle Night" was originally featured on the Best! Morning Musume 1 album and "Daite Hold on Me!" on the "Daite Hold on Me!" single. Morning Musume Otomegumi also did a version of "Say Yeah!: Motto Miracle Night" at the same time as Morning Musume Sakuragumi on the "Yūjō (Kokoro no Busu ni wa Naranee!)" single.

The single reached number two on the Oricon weekly charts and sold roughly 61,929 copies. This was 8,598 copies more than Otomegumi's 2nd single "Yūjō (Kokoro no Busu ni wa Naranee!)".

== Track listings ==
=== CD ===
1. "Sakura Mankai"
2. "Say Yeah!: Motto Miracle Night (Morning Musume Sakuragumi Version)"
3. "Daite Hold on Me! (Morning Musume Sakuragumi Version)"
4. "Sakura Mankai" (Instrumental)

=== Single V DVD ===
This DVD also included Morning Musume Otomegumi's Yūjō "(Kokoro no Busu ni wa Naranee!)".

1 "Sakura Mankai" / Morning Musume Sakuragumi
3 "Sakura Mankai (Another Version)" / Morning Musume Sakuragumi

== Members at time of single ==
- 2nd generation: Mari Yaguchi
- 4th generation: Hitomi Yoshizawa, Ai Kago
- 5th generation: Ai Takahashi, Asami Konno, Risa Niigaki
- 6th generation: Eri Kamei
