= GAM (group) =

Japanese pop group

- Origin: Tokyo, Honshū, Japan
- Genres: Pop
- Years active: 2006–2009
- Labels: Hachama
- Past members: Aya Matsuura; Miki Fujimoto
- Website: Hello! Project.com

GAM (ギャム, Gyamu) was a Japanese pop unit under the Hello! Project umbrella consisting of Aya Matsuura and former Morning Musume member Miki Fujimoto. This pairing was announced mid-June 2006. Previously, Matsuura and Fujimoto worked together in the one-off group Gomattou with Maki Goto.

According to Hello! Project producer Tsunku, the term GAM stands for "Great Aya and Miki." After GAM's debut, Tsunku decided to keep the group permanent instead of a one-time deal. However, with Fujimoto and Matsuura graduating from Hello! Project in March 2009, the group subsequently disbanded.

== History ==
On September 13, 2006, their first single, "Thanks!," was released in Japan and made its debut at number two on the Oricon Daily Ranking chart. The single made its debut (and also peaked) the following week at number five in the Oricon Weekly Ranking chart and stayed in the top 200 for five weeks.

Their second single, "Melodies" (メロディーズ, Merodīzu), was released October 18, 2006, making its debut at number five on the Oricon Daily Ranking chart the same day. The Ninki weekly singles chart ranked "Melodies" as the fourth most anticipated new release of the week. On the Japanese version of the iTunes Store, the PV for the song was ranked number one on the Top Music Videos list, presumably ranked by sales, by November 3, 2006. "Melodies" features a more mature theme and contains several scenes implying an almost-sexual relationship between the two singers, such as the near-kiss sequence featured in the televised form of the PV; just as the two of them are about to kiss, the video comes to an abrupt end. The complete version of the PV released on the DVD showed that the two singers had actually kissed at the end of the video. Due to this, they were compared to the Russian pop duo t.A.T.u. and dubbed among some listeners as the "Japanese t.A.T.u."

Additionally, on the evening of the 28th of an uncertain month, Matsuura officially revealed her desire to go on a tour as part of GAM. Though her partner agreed, Fujimoto commented on how the group would need to record more original songs in order to do such a thing. Eventually, both members requested an album from producer Tsunku.

Their third single, Lu Lu Lu, was released on March 21, 2007. Three days later, "Daisuki Rakuten Eagles" was released as a theme song for the baseball team Tohoku Rakuten Golden Eagles, the third Hello! Project song to do so.

== Members ==
- Aya Matsuura (松浦 亜弥)
- Miki Fujimoto (藤本 美貴)

== Discography ==
=== Albums ===
| # | Title | Release date | Peak position | Copies Sold |
|---|---|---|---|---|
| 1 | 1st GAM: Amai Yuwaku (1st GAM～甘い誘惑～) | 23 May 2007 | #12 | 22,506 |

=== Singles ===
| # | Title | Release date | Peak position | Copies Sold |
|---|---|---|---|---|
| 1 | "Thanks!" | 13 September 2006 | #5 | 36,477 |
| 2 | "Melodies" (メロディーズ, Merodīzu) | 18 October 2006 | #8 | 33,324 |
| 3 | "Lu Lu Lu" | 21 March 2007 | #10 | 21,836 |
| – | "Daisuki Rakuten Eagles" (ダイスキ楽天イーグルス, Daisuki Rakuten Īgurusu; I Love Rakuten Eagles) | 24 March 2007 | - | - |

=== Single V DVD ===
| # | Title | Release date |
|---|---|---|
| 1 | Single V "Thanks!" | 20 September 2006 |
| 2 | Single V "Melodies" (メロディーズ) | 2 November 2006 |
| 3 | Single V "Lu Lu Lu" | 28 March 2007 |

=== Concerts ===
- GAM 1st Concert Tour 2007 Shoka Natsu ~Great Aya & Miki~ – 29 August 2007
