= Aenai Nagai Nichiyōbi =

Single by Miki Fujimoto

from the album MIKI 1
- Released: March 12, 2002 (JP)
- Recorded: 2002
- Genre: J-pop
- Length: 11:24
- Label: Hachama
- Producer(s): Tsunku

Miki Fujimoto singles chronology
"Aenai Nagai Nichiyōbi" (2002)	"Sotto Kuchi Tsukete Gyuuto Dakishimete" (2002)

"Aenai Nagai Nichiyōbi" (会えない長い日曜日) is a song by J-pop artist and Hello! Project member Miki Fujimoto, released as a single on March 12, 2002. It sold a total of 43,670 copies.

== Track listing ==
1. Aenai Nagai Nichiyōbi (会えない長い日曜日)
2. Let's Do Daihyakken! (Let's Do 大発見！)
3. Aenai Nagai Nichiyōbi (会えない長い日曜日) (Instrumental)
