= Zutto Suki de Ii desu ka =

"Zutto Suki de Ii Desu ka"

Single by Aya Matsuura
- Released: February 23, 2005
- Recorded: 2005
- Genre: Japanese Pop
- Label: Zetima
- Producer(s): Tsunku; Yasuharu Konishi

Aya Matsuura singles chronology
"Watarasebashi" (2004)	"Zutto Suki de Ii Desu ka" (2005)	"Ki ga Tsukeba Anata" (2005)

"Zutto Suki de Ii Desu Ka" (ずっと 好きでいいですか) is the 16th single from Aya Matsuura, a Hello! Project solo artist. It was released on February 23, 2005, under the Zetima label.

== Track listings ==
=== CD ===
1. "Zutto Suki de ii Desu ka" (ずっと 好きでいいですか) – 4:10
2. "Yume" (夢) – 4:44
3. "Zutto Suki de ii Desu ka" (instrumental) – 4:10
