= Harvest Time (Chisato Moritaka album) =

Compilation album by Chisato Moritaka
- Released: November 25, 1999
- Recorded: 1989–1992
- Genres: J-pop; pop rock
- Length: 57:45
- Language: Japanese
- Label: WEA Japan
- Producer: Yukio Seto

Chisato Moritaka chronology
Mix Age (1999)	Harvest Time (1999)	My Favorites (2004)

Harvest Time (ハーベストタイム, Hābesuto Taimu), stylized in all lowercase, is a compilation album by Japanese singer-songwriter Chisato Moritaka, released on November 25, 1999, after her marriage to actor Yōsuke Eguchi on June 3 and her subsequent retirement from the music industry. The album features a selection of deep cuts from Moritaka's 1989–1992 back catalog, plus her recording of "Hikisakanaide Futari wo", which she originally wrote for Noriko Katō in 1992.

The album peaked at No. 82 on Oricon's albums chart and sold over 3,000 copies.

== Track listing ==
All lyrics are written by Chisato Moritaka, except where indicated; all music is composed and arranged by Hideo Saitō, except where indicated.

No.	Title	Lyrics	Music	Arrangement	Length
1.	"Rock 'n' Roll Kenchōshozaichi" (Rokkunrōru Kenchōshozaichi (ロックンロール県庁所在地; "Rock 'n' Roll Prefectural Government"))		Moritaka	Moritaka	2:29
2.	"Teriyaki Burger" (Teriyaki Bāgā (テリヤキ・バーガー))				4:36
3.	"Mitsuketa Saifu" ((見つけたサイフ; "The Wallet I Found"))				4:39
4.	"Daibōken" ((大冒険; "Great Adventure"))				4:36
5.	"Aru OL no Seishun ~ A-ko no Baai ~ (Moritaka Connection)" (Aru Ō Ēru no Seishun ~ Ē-ko no Baai ~ (Moritaka Konekushon) (あるOLの青春～A子の場合～ (森高コネクション); A Certain Young Office Lady ~ In the Case of Child A ~ (Moritaka Connection)))				4:08
6.	"Nozokainaide" ((のぞかないで; "Don't Look"))				4:36
7.	"Watashi wa Onchi" ((私はおんち; "I'm Tone Deaf"))			Yuichi Takahashi	3:55
8.	"Shiritagari" ((しりたがり; "Shy"))		Moritaka	Carlos Kanno; Yasuaki Maejima	2:50
9.	"Mijikai Natsu" ((短い夏; "Short Summer"))				4:56
10.	"Yowasete yo Kon'ya Dake" ((酔わせてよ今夜だけ; "Let Me Get Drunk Just for Tonight"))		Moritaka	Shin Kōno	3:37
11.	"Dotchi mo Dotchi" ((どっちもどっち; "Whichever"))		Takahashi		3:56
12.	"Yoru no Entotsu (Video Mix)" (Yoru no Entotsu (Bideo Mikkusu) (夜の煙突 (ビデオ･ミックス); "Night Chimney (Video Mix)"))	Masataro Naoe	Naoe	Carnation	4:54
13.	"Hikisakanaide Futari wo" ((引き裂かないで二人を; "Don't Tear Us Apart"))				3:52
14.	"Kono Machi" ((この街; "This Town"))				4:35
Total length:					57:45

== Personnel ==
- Chisato Moritaka – vocals (13)
- Hideo Saitō – all instruments and programming (13)

== Charts ==
Chart (1999)	Peak position
Japanese Albums (Oricon)	82
