= Romantic Ukare Mode =

Single by Miki Fujimoto

from the album MIKI 1
- Released: September 4, 2002 (JP)
- Recorded: 2002
- Genre: J-pop
- Length: 12:50
- Label: Hachama
- Producer(s): Tsunku

Miki Fujimoto singles chronology
"Sotto Kuchi Tsukete Gyuuto Dakishimete" (2002)	"Romantic Ukare Mode" (2002)	"Boyfriend" (2002)

"Romantic Ukare Mode" (ロマンティック浮かれモード) is a song by Miki Fujimoto, released as her third single on September 4, 2002, in Japan. It sold a total of 62,000 copies and is currently Fujimoto's highest-selling single. It is also her highest-charting single in Japan so far, and together with "Boyfriend" it is her longest-charting single in the Oricon top 200, having stayed on the chart for eleven weeks.

== Track listing ==
1. "Romantic Ukare Mode" (ロマンティック浮かれモード)
2. "Cake Yamemashita" (ケーキ止めました)
3. "Romantic Ukare Mode" (Instrumental)
