= Sava Sava =

Studio album by Chisato Moritaka
- Released: September 9, 1998
- Recorded: 1997–1998
- Genre: J-pop; pop rock
- Length: 48:51
- Language: Japanese
- Label: zetima
- Producer: Yukio Seto

Chisato Moritaka chronology
Kotoshi no Natsu wa More Better (1998)	Sava Sava (1998)	The Best Selection of First Moritaka 1987–1993 (1999)

Singles from Sava Sava
- 1. "Snow Again" Released: November 19, 1997; 2. "Denwa" Released: March 4, 1998; 3. "Umi made 5-fun" Released: July 15, 1998

Sava Sava (サバサバ, Saba Saba) is the 13th studio album by Japanese singer/songwriter Chisato Moritaka, released on September 9, 1998, by Zetima. The album is unique for containing a 22-page photo book and a fold-out poster featuring the same head shot of Moritaka in slightly different angles. It was Moritaka's final studio album prior to her marriage to actor Yōsuke Eguchi on June 3, 1999, and her subsequent retirement from the music industry.

The album reached No. 7 on Oricon's albums chart and sold over 92,000 copies.

== Track listing ==
All lyrics are written by Chisato Moritaka.

No.	Title	Music	Arrangement	Length
1.	"Utopia" (Yūtopia (ユートピア))	Shin Kono	Kono	4:57
2.	"Denwa (Album Version)" ((電話; "Telephone"))	Yuichi Takahashi	Shunsuke Suzuki	4:04
3.	"Tampopo no Tane" ((たんぽぽの種; "Dandelion Seeds"))	Shikao Suga	Suga	4:40
4.	"Itsumo no Mise" ((いつもの店; "The Usual Shop"))	Takahashi	Takahashi	4:17
5.	"Nagasarete..." ((流されて・・・; "Washed Away..."))	Takahashi	Takahashi	4:36
6.	"Two of Me"	Moritaka	Takahashi	4:05
7.	"Umi made 5-fun (Album Version)" (Umi made Go-fun (海まで5分; "5 Minutes to the Sea"))	Toshinobu Kubota	Takahashi	5:00
8.	"Wasurekakete Ita Yume" ((忘れかけていた夢; "Forgotten Dreams"))	Takahashi	Suzuki	4:38
9.	"Zaru de Mizu kumu Koigokoro" ((ザルで水くむ恋心; "Love Feeling in a Colander"))	Coil	Coil	3:50
10.	"Kiken na Hodō" ((危険な舗道; "Dangerous Pavement"))	Moritaka	Takahashi	4:21
11.	"Snow Again"	Takahashi	Takahashi	4:21
Total length:				48:51

== Personnel ==
- Chisato Moritaka – vocals, drums (all tracks)
- Yuichi Takahashi – guitar (1, 4, 6, 10–11), synthesizer programming (2, 4–7, 10), keyboards (11)
- Shin Kōno – keyboards & synthesizer programming (1), Fender Rhodes (7)
- Shin Hashimoto – piano (4, 10–11), Fender Rhodes (4), keyboards (11)
- Yasuaki Maejima – piano (5), Fender Rhodes (5)
- Shunsuke Suzuki – guitar (1–2), ukulele (2), sitar (2), synthesizer programming (2), pedal steel guitar (8), mandolin (8)
- Shikao Suga – guitar (3), bass (3), backing vocals (3)
- Yukio Seto – guitar (4–7, 11), percussion (7), bass (8, 11), wind chimes (8)
- Naoyuki Irie – bass (1)
- Udai Shika – cello (1)
- Masaaki Shigematsu – cello (1)
- Yasuo Maruyama – cello (1)
- Hideyuki Komatsu – bass (2)
- Fumitoshi Nakamura – manipulator (3)
- Coil – all instruments except drums (9)

- Sadayoshi "OK" Okamoto
- Yōsuke Satō

== Charts ==
Chart (1998)	Peak position
Japanese Albums (Oricon)	7
