= Denwa (song) =

1998 song by Chisato Moritaka

Single by Chisato Moritaka

from the album Sava Sava
- Language: Japanese
- English title: Telephone
- B-side: "Dragon"
- Released: March 4, 1998
- Recorded: 1997
- Genre: J-pop; pop rock
- Length: 3:57
- Label: One Up Music
- Composer: Yuichi Takahashi
- Lyricist: Chisato Moritaka
- Producer: Yukio Seto

Chisato Moritaka singles chronology
"Snow Again" (1997)	"Denwa" (1998)	"Umi made 5-fun" (1998)

Music video
- Denwa on YouTube

"Denwa" (電話; lit. "Telephone") is the 35th single by Japanese singer/songwriter Chisato Moritaka. Written by Moritaka and Yuichi Takahashi, the single was released by One Up Music on March 4, 1998. The song was used in a Kanebo Sala shampoo commercial featuring Moritaka. The B-side is "Dragon", an instrumental track.

== Music video ==
The music video was filmed partially in London. It also features Moritaka playing the accordion solo.

== Chart performance ==
"Denwa" peaked at No. 17 on Oricon's singles chart and sold 58,000 copies.

== Other versions ==
Moritaka re-recorded the song and uploaded the video on her YouTube channel on July 31, 2013. This version is also included in Moritaka's 2014 self-covers DVD album Love Vol. 5.

== Track listing ==
8 cm CD
No.	Title	Lyrics	Music	Arrangement	Length
1.	"Denwa" ((電話; "Telephone"))	Chisato Moritaka	Yuichi Takahashi	Takahashi	3:57
2.	"Dragon" (Instrumental)		Moritaka	Moritaka	3:23
3.	"Denwa" (Original Karaoke)				3:52

== Personnel ==
- Chisato Moritaka – vocals, drums, accordion, pianica
- Yuichi Takahashi – acoustic guitar, keyboard
- Shin Hashimoto – piano
- Yukio Seto – bass, percussion

== Charts ==
Chart (1998)	Peak position
Japanese Oricon Singles Chart	17
