= Boogie Train '03 =

Single by Miki Fujimoto

from the album MIKI 1
- Released: 5 February 2003 (JP)
- Recorded: 2002
- Genre: J-pop
- Length: 11:51
- Label: hachama
- Producer(s): Tsunku

Miki Fujimoto singles chronology
"Boyfriend" (2002)	"Boogie Train '03" (2003)	"Okitegami" (2008)

"Boogie Train '03" (ブギートレイン'03) is the fifth single released by Miki Fujimoto. It was released on February 5, 2003, and sold a total of 43,804 copies, reaching number eight on the Oricon chart.

First pressing of this single came in a special tin packaging.

This is Fujimoto's last solo single before she joined the 6th Generation of Morning Musume.

Hello! Project Kids members Erika Umeda, Momoko Tsugunaga, Chinami Tokunaga, and Maasa Sudo appear in the pv.

== Track listing ==
1. "Boogie Train '03" (ブギートレイン'03, Bugii Torein '03)
2. "Taisetsu" (大切)
3. Boogie Train '03 (Instrumental)
