= Morning Musume Sakuragumi =

Japanese pop group

- Morning Musume Sakuragumi, 2004. Top row (L to R): Asami Konno, Eri Kamei, Risa Niigaki, Hitomi Yoshizawa; Bottom row (L to R): Mari Yaguchi, Ai Takahashi, Ai Kago

Background information
- Origin: Japan
- Genres: Pop
- Years active: 2003–2004
- Labels: Zetima
- Past members: Asami Konno; Mari Yaguchi; Ai Kago; Natsumi Abe; Hitomi Yoshizawa; Ai Takahashi; Risa Niigaki; Eri Kamei
- Website: Hello! Project.com

Morning Musume Sakuragumi (モーニング娘｡ さくら組, also romanized as Morning Musume Sakura Gumi), meaning "Sakura Group", was one of the subgroups derived from the Japanese pop group Morning Musume in 2003. Its less successful equivalent was Morning Musume Otomegumi. Like its counterpart, the sole purpose of Sakuragumi was to accommodate towns with smaller concert venues. The group was meant to embody the traditional Japanese woman. Sakuragumi (as well as Otomegumi) became inactive in March 2004, after releasing two singles.

== History ==
By 2003, Morning Musume's ranks had swelled to a total of fifteen members. In January, producer Tsunku made the decision to split the girls into two groups, "Sakura" and "Otome". Each group had its own theme - the Sakuragumi girls were much more traditional in song and clothing than Otomegumi, performing ballads, with a calmer and more subdued image. The group's name derives both from the Japanese cherry blossom, associated with spring, and Tsunku's wish for the girls to "bloom like beautiful flowers." The two groups would perform almost identical set-lists, and perform in the same towns simultaneously, at different venues. Natsumi Abe, a first-generation Morning Musume member, was assigned to be the leader. The group released their first single, "Hare Ame Nochi Suki", on September 18, 2003. The single sold well, reaching a peak of #2 on the weekly Oricon charts. Their first tour, "Morning Musume Sakuragumi Hatsukōen: Sakura Saku", began on November 24.

It was later announced that Abe would be graduating from both Morning Musume and Sakuragumi in 2004. Sakuragumi performed "Hare Ame Nochi Suki" with Abe for the final time at her graduation concert in January. After Abe's graduation Mari Yaguchi was elected as the next leader, and the group continued to tour. Their second and final single, "Sakura Mankai", was released on February 25, 2004 and featured the new line-up of seven girls. This single, like the first, sold well and charted at #2, outselling Otomegumi's single. In June their first concert DVD was released.

Following the cessation of their tour, the group made no more releases and became dormant, after the two subgroups merged back into one. In the years that followed both Yaguchi and Ai Kago left Morning Musume and Up-Front Works respectively due to scandals, and both Asami Konno and Hitomi Yoshizawa graduated in 2007. In February 2009, at the Elder Club's graduation concert, Sakuragumi (without Kago, who had been fired from the agency altogether in 2007) performed together for the first time in almost five years, singing "Hare Ame Nochi Suki". At Morning Musume's 2009 autumn tour, a Sakuragumi unit composed of Ai Takahashi, Risa Niigaki, Eri Kamei, Aika Mitsui, and Linlin performed "Sakura Mankai".

== Members ==
- 1st generation: Natsumi Abe (Former leader)
- 2nd generation: Mari Yaguchi (Leader)
- 4th generation: Hitomi Yoshizawa, Ai Kago
- 5th generation: Ai Takahashi, Asami Konno, Risa Niigaki
- 6th generation: Eri Kamei

== Discography ==
=== Singles ===
#	Title	Release date
1	"Hare Ame Nochi Suki"	2003-09-18
2	"Sakura Mankai"	2004-02-25

=== DVDs ===
#	Title	Release date
1	"Single V: Hare Ame Nochi Suki" (シングルV・晴れ 雨 のち スキ ♥)	2003-10-16
2	"Single V: Sakura Mankai / Yūjō (Kokoro no Busu ni wa Naranee!)" (シングルV・さくら満開/友情～心のブスにはならねぇ!～)	2004-03-24
3	"Morning Musume Sakuragumi Hatsukōen: Sakura Saku" (モーニング娘。おとめ組～さくら咲く～)	2004-06-06
