= Watarasebashi =

1993 song by Chisato Moritaka

Single by Chisato Moritaka

from the album Lucky 7
- Language: Japanese
- English title: Watarase Bridge
- A-side: "Writer Shibō"
- Released: January 25, 1993
- Recorded: 1993
- Genre: J-pop; folk-pop
- Length: 3:47
- Label: Warner Music Japan
- Composer: Hideo Saitō
- Lyricist: Chisato Moritaka
- Producer: Hideo Saitō

Chisato Moritaka singles chronology
"Watashi ga Obasan ni Natte mo" (1992)	"Watarasebashi" / "Writer Shibō" (1993)	"Watashi no Natsu" (1993)

Music video
- Watarasebashi on YouTube

Audio sample
- "Watarasebashi": file; help

Watarasebashi

Video by Chisato Moritaka
- Released: November 15, 2017
- Genre: J-pop; folk-pop
- Language: Japanese
- Label: Warner Music Japan
- Producer: Yukio Seto

Chisato Moritaka chronology
The Moritaka Tour 1991.8.22 at Shibuya Public Hall (2017)	Watarasebashi (2017)	Love Vol. 10 (2017)

"Watarasebashi" (渡良瀬橋(わたらせばし); lit. "Watarase Bridge") is the 17th single by Japanese singer/songwriter Chisato Moritaka. The lyrics were written by Moritaka and the music was composed by Hideo Saitō. The single was released alongside "Writer Shibō" (ライター志望; lit. "Writer's Aspirations") by Warner Music Japan on January 25, 1993. The song was used as the theme song to the TX variety show Ii Tabi: Yume Kibun.

== Background ==
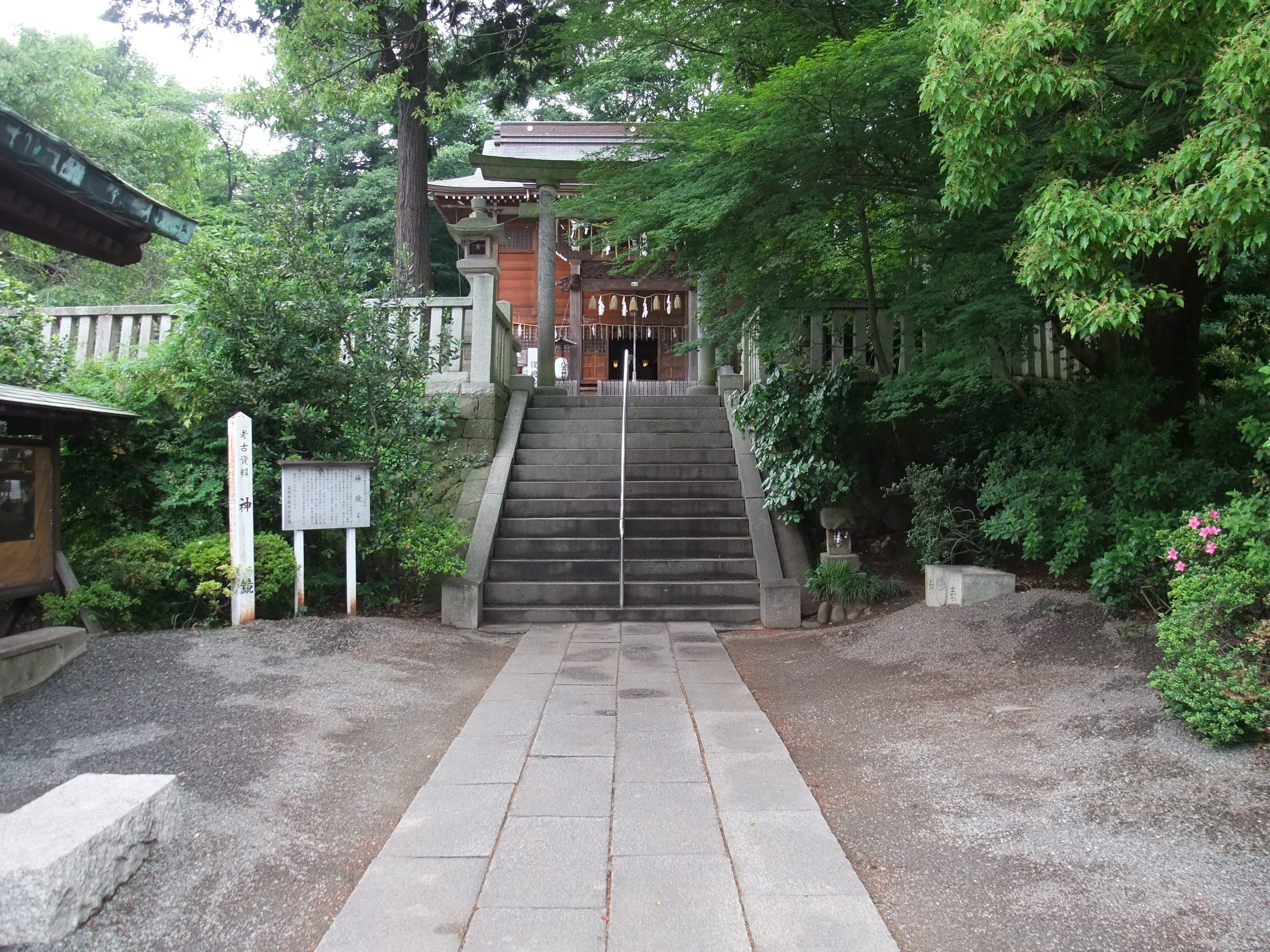
The Yagumo Temple in Ashikaga, Tochigi is mentioned in the song's first chorus.

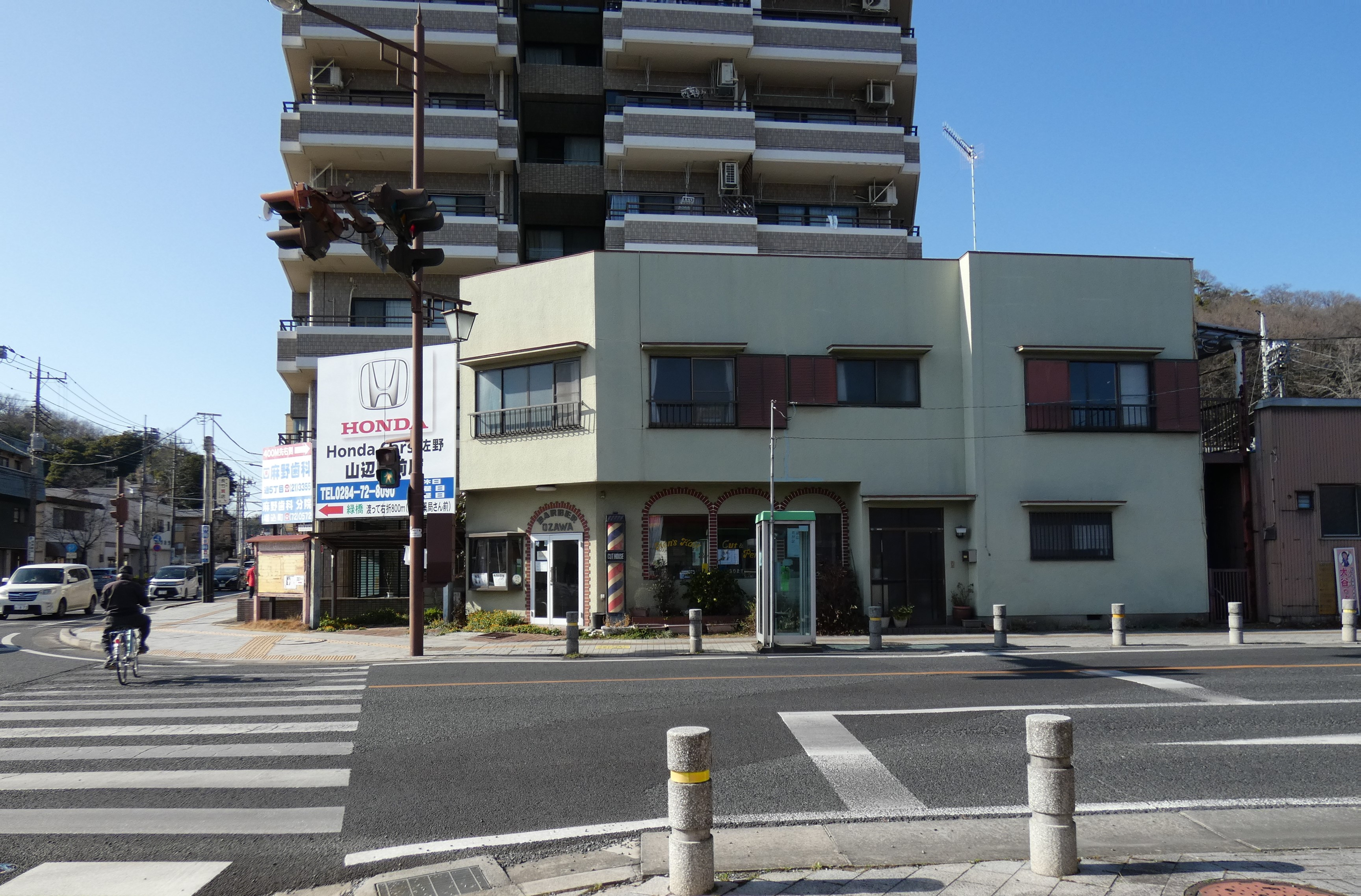
The Ozawa Barber Shop and adjacent telephone booth in Ashikaga are referenced in the lyrics.

"Watarasebashi" is composed in the key of C major and set to a tempo of 77 beats per minute. Moritaka's vocals span from B_{3} to C_{5}. Lyrically, the song tells the story of a woman reminiscing on a past love at the sight of a sunset. When writing the song, Moritaka scanned maps of Japan in search of bridges or rivers with a "beautiful" sounding name and found the Watarase River. When she learned of the existence of the Watarase Bridge in Ashikaga, Tochigi, a city she had once visited while touring, she decided to base the lyrics on the area.

== Music video ==
The music video for "Watarasebashi" pays homage to The Beatles's "Let It Be" and features Moritaka performing the song on piano, playing the drums as well as performing the recorder solo.

== Chart performance ==
"Watarasebashi" debuted at No. 9 on the Oricon Singles Chart with 72,000 units sold in the first week. It fell out of the top twenty two weeks later, but came back the next week at number 20 before dropping off again. The single charted in the top 100 for fifteen weeks, selling a reported total of 310,000 copies during its run. "Watarasebashi" ranked at number 96 on the year-end chart.

== Other versions ==
On November 25, 2009, Moritaka released a newly recorded version of the song as a double A-side single with "Ame".

The original version was remastered and reissued in Ultimate High Quality CD (UHQCD) format on November 15, 2017 as part of the "Complete Box" (完全版BOX, Kanzenhan Bokkusu), which includes the remastered CD single, a 7-inch vinyl and a Blu-ray featuring the remastered music video and bonus footage from the making-of video to Moritaka's revisit to Ashikaga in 2012.

== Other media ==
"Watarasebashi" was released as an interactive CD-ROM by Oracion on December 20, 1995. The CD-ROM features the music video, interviews with Moritaka, VR photos of Ashikaga and five extra music videos. It was re-released in the two-disc set Watarasebashi/La La Sunshine for the Sega Saturn on September 11, 1997.

The song was included in the 2020 various artists album Egao no Uta ~ Minna no Kokoro ni Nokoru Suteki na Kyoku, Kokoro ni Sotto Yorisou Uta ~ (エガオのウタ～みんなのココロに残るステキな曲、ココロにそっと寄り添う歌～; Songs of Smiles ~ Wonderful Songs That Remain in Everyone's Heart, Songs That Gently Snuggle Up to Your Heart~).

== Legacy ==
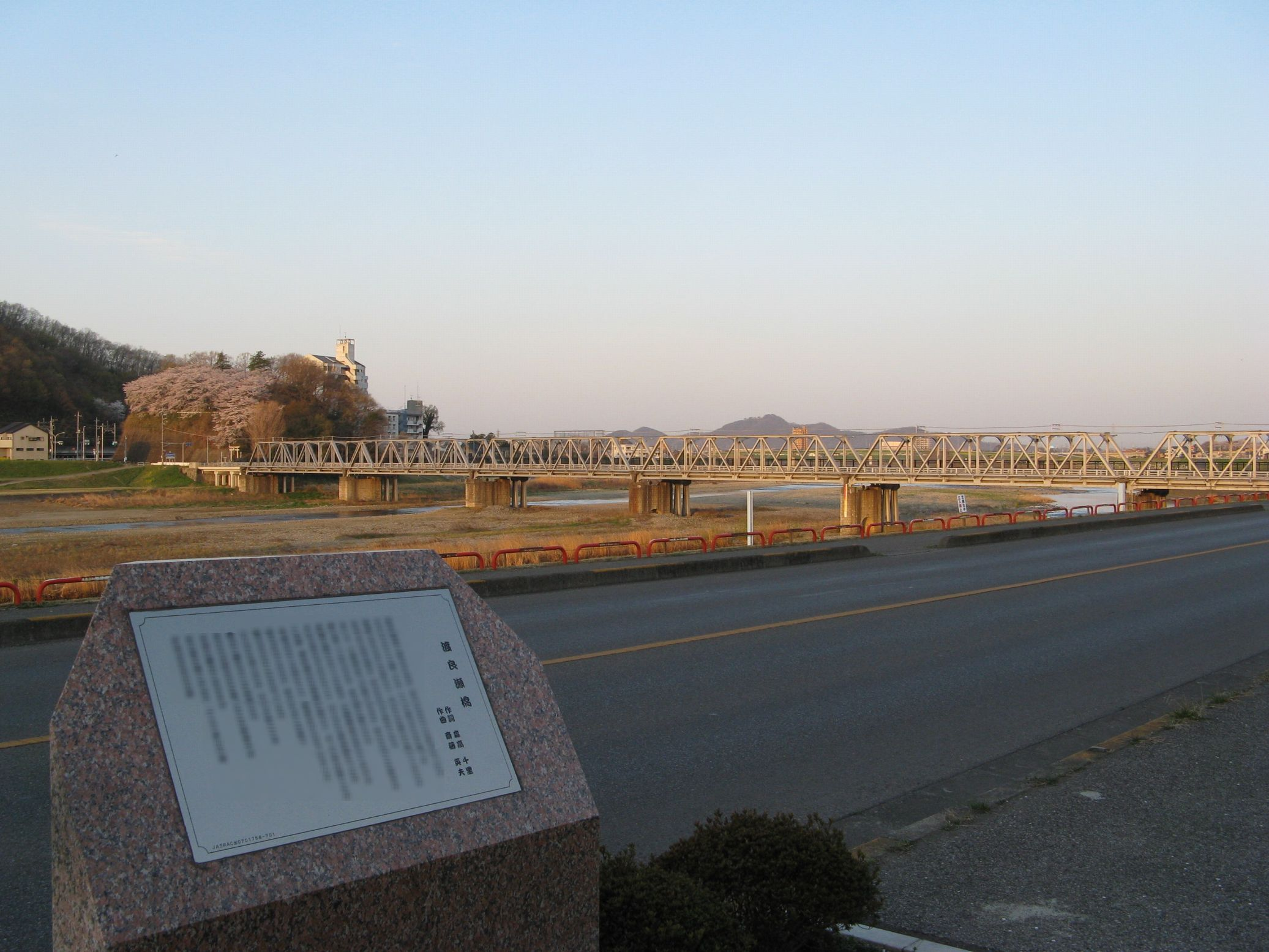
The Watarasebashi Monument near the Watarase Bridge.

In 2007, a stele was erected in Ashikaga in honor of Moritaka's contributions to the city. The stele features a speaker that plays the song. Since being mentioned in the song, the Yagumo Shrine (八雲神社, Yagumo-jinja) and the phone booth outside Ozawa Barber Shop have become popular sightseeing spots. When the shrine burned down in a fire in December 2012, Moritaka raised funds to support its reconstruction, which was completed in late 2017. In July 2015, Ashikaga Station and Ashikagashi Station adopted the song as their train melody.

== Track listing ==
All lyrics are written by Chisato Moritaka; all music is composed and arranged by Hideo Saitō.

1993 single

8 cm CD
No.	Title	Length
1.	"Watarasebashi" ((渡良瀬橋; "Watarase Bridge"))	3:47
2.	"Writer Shibō" (Raitā Shibō (ライター志望; "Writer's Aspirations"))	3:55
Total length:		7:42

Cassette
No.	Title	Length
1.	"Watarasebashi"
2.	"Writer Shibō"
3.	"Watarasebashi" (Karaoke)
4.	"Writer Shibō" (Karaoke)

2017 Blu-ray Complete Box

Disc 1: Blu-ray
No.	Title	Length
1.	"Watarasebashi (Original Music Video)" ((渡良瀬橋（オリジナルMUSIC VIDEO）))
2.	"Watarasebashi ("Making of" Video)" ((渡良瀬橋（MUSIC VIDEO）メイキング映像))
3.	"Watarasebashi (Music Video 2017 HD)" ((渡良瀬橋［MUSIC VIDEO 2017（HD）］))
4.	"Chisato Moritaka Official YouTube Video 'Watarasebashi and Me' (2012) Full Version (HD)" (Moritaka Chisato YūChūbu Eizō 'Watarasebashi to Watashi' (2012-nen) Kanzen-han (HD) (森高千里公式YouTube映像「渡良瀬橋と私」（2012年）完全版（HD）))

Disc 2: UHQCD
No.	Title	Length
1.	"Watarasebashi [2017 Remaster]" ((渡良瀬橋【2017Remaster】))	3:46
2.	"Watarasebashi (Chisato Moritaka 30th Anniversary Celebration Version)" (Moritaka Chisato Sanjū Shūnen Kinen Vājon (渡良瀬橋（森高千里30周年記念Version）))	5:05
3.	"Watarasebashi (Original Karaoke) [2017 Remaster]" ((渡良瀬橋（オリジナル・カラオケ）【2017Remaster】))	3:43
Total length:		12:34

Disc 3: 7-inch EP
No.	Title	Length
1.	"Watarasebashi" (2017 Remaster)	3:46
2.	"Watarasebashi" (Chisato Moritaka 30th Anniversary Celebration Version)	5:05
Total length:		8:51

== Personnel ==
- Chisato Moritaka – vocals, drums, piano, alto recorder
- Hideo Saitō – guitar, bass, tambourine, synthesizer

== Charts ==
Chart (1993)	Peak position
Japan Weekly Singles (Oricon)	9
Japan Monthly Singles (Oricon)	16
Japan Yearly Singles (Oricon)	96

== Certification ==
Region	Certification	Certified units/sales
Japan (RIAJ)	Gold	200,000^{^}
^{^} Shipments figures based on certification alone.

== Aya Matsuura version ==
"Watarasebashi"

Single by Aya Matsuura

from the album Aya Matsuura Best 1
- B-side: "I Love You no Tsuzuki"
- Released: October 20, 2004
- Recorded: 2004
- Genre: Pop
- Length: 3:47
- Label: Zetima
- Composer: Hideo Saitō
- Lyricist: Chisato Moritaka

Aya Matsuura singles chronology
"Your Song (Seishun Sensei)" (2004)	"Watarasebashi" (2004)	"Zutto Suki de Ii desu ka" (2005)

Audio sample
- "Watarasebashi": file; help

"Watarasebashi" was recorded by Hello! Project soloist and one-time Moritaka labelmate Aya Matsuura. It was released as a single by Zetima on October 20, 2004. The music video features Matsuura performing the song on a footbridge, with two schoolchildren playing recorders during the instrumental section.

=== Chart performance ===
Matsuura's version of "Watarasebashi" debuted at number 6 on the Oricon Singles Chart with 29,000 units sold, peaking higher than the original Moritaka version. Her version charted on the Oricon Singles Chart for six weeks, selling a reported total of 48,000 copies during its run.

=== Track listing ===
No.	Title	Writer(s)	Arrangement	Length
1.	"Watarasebashi" (渡良瀬橋, "Watarase Bridge")	Chisato Moritaka; Hideo Saitō	Kōji Makaino	4:17
2.	"I Love You no Tsuzuki" (I LOVE YOUの続き, "The Continuation to I Love You")	Tsunku	Shōichirō Hirata	5:01
3.	"Watarasebashi" (Instrumental)	Saitō	Makaino	4:14
Total length:				13:32

=== Charts ===
Chart (2004)	Peak position
Japan Weekly Singles (Oricon)	6
Japan Monthly Singles (Oricon)	22

=== Sales ===
Region	Certification	Certified units/sales
Japan (RIAJ)	—N/a	48,000

== Other cover versions ==
- Enka singer Sanae Jōnouchi included a cover of the song as B-side to her 1993 single "Yowasete yo Kon'ya Dake", which is also a cover of a Moritaka song.
- Gen Takayama recorded a cover of the song for his 1993 album Kokoro Kōrasete, his first album in eleven years.
- Chaka covered the song for her 1999 album I Found Love.
- Maomi Yuki covered the song for her 2003 EP Real My Heart.
- Maki Goto recorded her version of the song for her 2005 album 3rd Station.
- Kyogo Kawaguchi recorded a cover of the song for his 2007 cover album Kimi wo Suki Datta Ano Koro.
- ManaKana recorded a cover of the song for their third cover album Futari Uta 3 in 2010.
- The Japanese music duo Kasarinchu covered the song, in collaboration with Shin Kono, for the 2013 album Sū-chan Mai-chan Sawako-san.
- Minami Kizuki recorded a cover of the song for her first cover album Sakuranagashi in 2015.
