= Morning Musume Otomegumi =

Japanese pop group

- Morning Musume Otomegumi, 2004. Top row (L to R): Makoto Ogawa, Sayumi Michishige, Reina Tanaka, Kaori Iida; Bottom row (L to R): Nozomi Tsuji, Miki Fujimoto, Rika Ishikawa

Background information
- Origin: Tokyo, Honshū, Japan
- Genres: J-pop
- Years active: 2003–2004
- Labels: Zetima
- Spinoff of: Morning Musume
- Past members: Kaori Iida; Rika Ishikawa; Nozomi Tsuji; Makoto Ogawa; Miki Fujimoto; Sayumi Michishige; Reina Tanaka
- Website: www.helloproject.com

Morning Musume Otomegumi (Japanese: モーニング娘｡おとめ組; lit. "Morning Musume Maiden Group") was one of the subgroups that the Japanese pop group Morning Musume was divided into in 2003. Its counterpart was Morning Musume Sakuragumi. The purpose of Morning Musume Otomegumi was to perform in small towns with low-capacity venues. The group represented modern young women. Like their counterpart, they released two singles before entering indefinite hiatus.

== History ==
Otomegumi was originally announced in January 2003, when producer Tsunku decided to split Morning Musume into two groups. Due to the large number of girls, meaning performances could only take place in large venues, and high demand for performances, the girls were split in half to allow the group to perform in more arenas and in smaller towns. Out of the fifteen girls, seven were put into Otomegumi, the other eight into Sakuragumi. The girls' theme was representing "modern Japanese youth". Kaori Iida, the oldest of the girls and a founding member of Morning Musume, was chosen to be leader. Otomegumi's first single, "Ai no Sono (Touch My Heart!)" was released on September 18, 2003, the same day as Sakuragumi's debut single. The single reached a peak of #3 on the weekly Oricon chart, losing out to Sakuragumi by a single place. The girls' first tour, "Morning Musume Otomegumi Hatsukōen: Otome Chick" began on November 24.

The group's second and final single, "Yūjō (Kokoro no Busu ni wa Naranee!)", was released on February 25, 2004. While Sakuragumi again claimed second place in the charts, Otomegumi sank to fifth. Their first tour DVD was released in June. After the releases the group became dormant, and the two groups were effectively dissolved when Morning Musume reformed as a whole once again in March 2004. During the remainder of the decade all members but Sayumi Michishige and Reina Tanaka graduated from Morning Musume. The group remained in hiatus until February 2009, when all seven original members reformed for a performance of their debut single at the Elder Club's graduation concert. In December of the same year, their second single was performed by a temporary unit composed of Michishige, Tanaka, Koharu Kusumi and Junjun at Kusumi's graduation concert. And after the performance the group went back into indefinite hiatus.

== Members ==
- 1st generation: Kaori Iida (Leader)
- 4th generation: Rika Ishikawa, Nozomi Tsuji
- 5th generation: Makoto Ogawa
- 6th generation: Miki Fujimoto, Sayumi Michishige, Reina Tanaka

== Discography ==
=== Singles ===
#	Title	Release date
1	"Ai no Sono (Touch My Heart!)"	2003-09-18
2	"Yūjō (Kokoro no Busu ni wa Naranee!)"	2004-02-25

=== DVDs ===
#	Title	Release date
1	"Single V: Ai no Sono (Touch My Heart!)" (愛の園～Touch My Heart!～)	2003-10-16
2	"Single V: Sakura Mankai / Yūjō (Kokoro no Busu ni wa Naranee!)" (シングルV・さくら満開/友情～心のブスにはならねぇ!～)	2004-03-24
3	"Morning Musume Otomegumi Hatsukōen: Otome Chick" (モーニング娘。おとめ組～おとめチック～)	2004-06-06
