= Kizuna (Aya Matsuura song) =

Single by Aya Matsuura
- Released: May 21, 2008
- Recorded: 2008
- Genre: Japanese Pop
- Label: Zetima
- Producer(s): Tsunku, Yasuharu Konishi

Aya Matsuura singles chronology
"Egao" (2007)	"Kizuna" (2008)	"Chocolate Damashii" (2009)

"Kizuna" (きずな) is the 20th single from Aya Matsuura, a Hello! Project solo artist. It was released on May 21, 2008 under the Zetima label. It peaked at number 20 on Oricon Singles Chart.

== Track listings ==
=== CD ===
1. "Kizuna" (きずな) 2. "Hitori" (ひとり)

- This song was originally featured on her 2006 album "Naked Songs".
