= Watashi no Yō ni =

1999 song by Chisato Moritaka

Single by Chisato Moritaka

from the album mix age*
- Language: Japanese
- English title: Like Me
- B-side: "Space"
- Released: March 17, 1999
- Recorded: 1998
- Genre: J-pop
- Length: 5:06
- Label: zetima
- Composer: Shin Kono
- Lyricist: Chisato Moritaka
- Producer: Yukio Seto

Chisato Moritaka singles chronology
"Tsumetai Tsuki" (1998)	"Watashi no Yō ni" (1999)	"Mahiru no Hoshi" (1999)

Music video
- Watashi no Yō ni on YouTube

"Watashi no Yō ni" (私のように; lit. "Like Me") is the 38th single by Japanese singer/songwriter Chisato Moritaka. Written by Moritaka and Shin Kono, the single was released by zetima on March 17, 1999. The song was used by Kirin for their Naturals smoothies commercials.

== Chart performance ==
"Watashi no Yō ni" peaked at No. 37 on Oricon's singles chart and sold 11,000 copies.

== Other versions ==
Moritaka re-recorded the song and uploaded the video on her YouTube channel on September 28, 2013. This version is also included in Moritaka's 2014 self-covers DVD album Love Vol. 5.

== Track listing ==
All lyrics are written by Chisato Moritaka.

8 cm CD
No.	Title	Music	Arrangement	Length
1.	"Watashi no Yō ni" ((私のように; "Like Me"))	Shin Kono	Kono	5:06
2.	"Space"	Moritaka	Yuichi Takahashi	3:52
3.	"Watashi no Yō ni" (Original Karaoke)			5:02

== Personnel ==
- Chisato Moritaka – vocals, drums
- Yuichi Takahashi – acoustic guitar, synthesizer programming
- Shin Kōno – Fender Rhodes, acoustic guitar
- Cornell Dupree – guitar
- Yukio Seto – guitar

== Charts ==
Chart (1999)	Peak position
Japanese Oricon Singles Chart	37
