= Ichido Asobi ni Kite yo =

1999 song by Chisato Moritaka

"Ichido Asobi ni Kite yo '99"

Single by Chisato Moritaka

from the album mix age*
- Language: Japanese
- English title: Come Out and Play '99
- B-side: "Every Day"
- Released: October 1, 1999
- Recorded: 1999
- Genre: J-pop
- Length: 5:04
- Label: zetima
- Composer: Hideo Saitō
- Lyricist: Chisato Moritaka
- Producer: Yukio Seto

Chisato Moritaka singles chronology
"Mahiru no Hoshi" (1999)	"Ichido Asobi ni Kite yo '99" (1999)	"La La Sunshine (re-release)" (2008)

"Ichido Asobi ni Kite yo '99" (一度遊びに来てよ’99, Ichido Asobi ni Kite yo Kyūjūkyū; lit. "Come Out and Play '99) is the 40th single by Japanese singer/songwriter Chisato Moritaka. Written by Moritaka and Hideo Saitō, the single was released by zetima on October 1, 1999. It is a re-recording of the song from Moritaka's 1994 album Step by Step. The song was Moritaka's final single before her retirement following her marriage to actor Yōsuke Eguchi and her pregnancy at the end of 1999.

== Chart performance ==
"Ichido Asobi ni Kite yo '99" peaked at No. 60 on Oricon's singles chart and sold 7,000 copies, making it Moritaka's lowest selling single.

== Other versions ==
Moritaka re-recorded the song and uploaded the video on her YouTube channel on April 27, 2013. This version is also included in Moritaka's 2013 self-covers DVD album Love Vol. 4.

== Track listing ==
All lyrics are written by Chisato Moritaka.

8 cm CD
No.	Title	Music	Arrangement	Length
1.	"Ichido Asobi ni Kite yo '99" ((一度遊びに来てよ’99; "Come Out and Play '99))	Hideo Saitō	Yasuaki Maejima	5:04
2.	"Every Day"	Yuichi Takahashi	Takahashi	5:44
3.	"Ichido Asobi ni Kite yo '99" (Instrumental)			5:04
4.	"Every Day" (Instrumental)			5:44

== Personnel ==
- Chisato Moritaka – vocals, loop drums
- David T. Walker – guitar
- Yasuaki Maejima – Fender Rhodes, keyboards, synthesizer programming

== Chart positions ==
Chart (1999)	Peak position
Japanese Oricon Singles Chart	60
