= Snow Again =

1997 song by Chisato Moritaka

Single by Chisato Moritaka

from the album Sava Sava
- Language: Japanese
- B-side: "Pa-Pa-Paya"
- Released: November 19, 1997
- Recorded: 1997
- Genre: J-pop
- Length: 4:25
- Label: One Up Music
- Composer: Yuichi Takahashi
- Lyricist: Chisato Moritaka
- Producer: Yukio Seto

Chisato Moritaka singles chronology
| "Miracle Light" (1997) | "Snow Again" (1997) | "Denwa" (1998) |

Music video
- Snow Again on YouTube

"Snow Again" (スノー・アゲイン, Sunō Agein) is the 34th single by Japanese singer/songwriter Chisato Moritaka. Written by Moritaka and Yuichi Takahashi, the single was released by One Up Music on November 19, 1997. The song was used for TV commercials promoting Meiji's Melty Kiss chocolate.

The music video was filmed in parts of Hokkaido, including Niseko Station.

== Chart performance ==
"Snow Again" peaked at No. 9 on Oricon's singles chart and sold 134,000 copies, becoming Moritaka's last top 10 single. It was also her last single to be certified Gold by the RIAJ.

== Other versions ==
Moritaka re-recorded the song and uploaded the video on her YouTube channel on December 10, 2012. This version is also included in Moritaka's 2013 self-covers DVD album Love Vol. 3. She uploaded another self-cover of the song titled "Snow Again 2014" on December 12, 2014 This version is included in the 2015 self-covers DVD album Love Vol. 8.

== Track listing ==
All lyrics are written by Chisato Moritaka; all music is arranged by Yuichi Takahashi.

8 cm CD
| No. | Title | Music | Length |
|---|---|---|---|
| 1. | "Snow Again" | Yuichi Takahashi | 4:25 |
| 2. | "Pa-Pa-Paya" (Pappappaya (パッパッパヤ)) | Moritaka | 3:58 |
| 3. | "Snow Again" (Original Karaoke) | | 4:21 |

== Personnel ==
- Chisato Moritaka – vocals, drums
- Yuichi Takahashi – acoustic guitar, keyboard
- Shin Hashimoto – piano, keyboard, Fender Rhodes, synthesizer
- Yukio Seto – electric guitar, bass

== Chart positions ==
| Charts (1997) | Peak position |
|---|---|
| Japanese Oricon Singles Chart | 9 |

== Certification ==
| Region | Certification | Certified units/sales |
|---|---|---|
| Japan (RIAJ) | Gold | 200,000^{^} |
^{^} Shipments figures based on certification alone.

== Cover versions ==
- Runa Miyoshida covered the song in her 2008 album Love Gift ～pure flavor extra～.
- Sakura Nogawa covered the song in her 2010 cover album Winter Song Cover Best.
