= Aya Matsuura =

Japanese actress and pop singer (born 1986)

- 松浦 亜弥
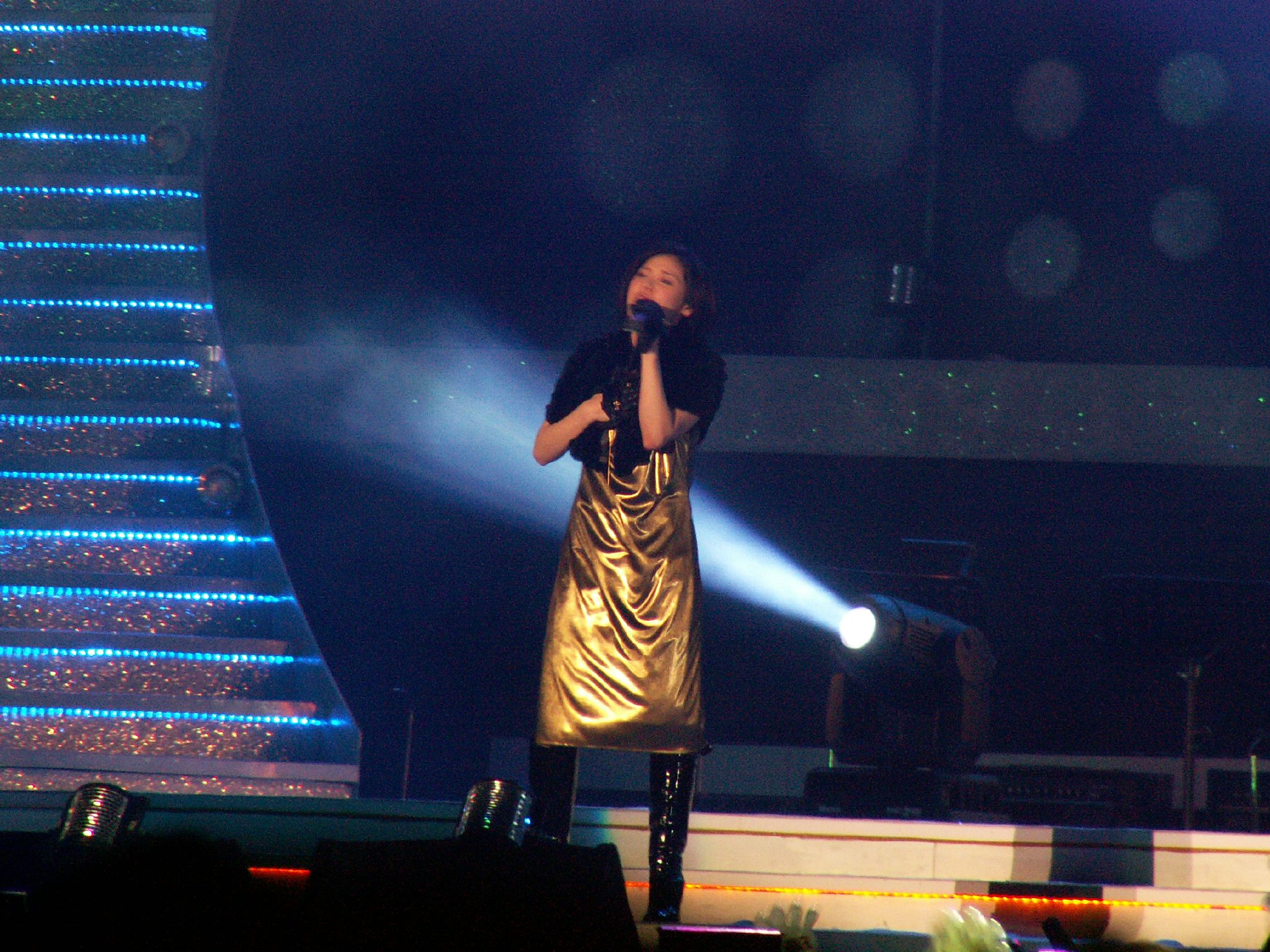
- Aya Matsuura at V Power "Music Storm", December 9, 2006
- Born: June 25, 1986 (age 40); Himeji, Hyōgo, Japan
- Occupations: Singer; actress
- Years active: 2000–2013, 2022–present
- Spouse: Keita Tachibana (m. 2013)
- Children: 3
- Musical career
- Genre: J-pop
- Label: Zetima
- Formerly of: GAM; Gomattou; Def.Diva; 3nin Matsuri; Odoru 11; Salt5; Nochiura Natsumi; H.P. All Stars

Aya Matsuura (松浦 亜弥, Matsuura Aya; born June 25, 1986) is a Japanese singer and actress. Matsuura began her career as a solo artist within the idol musical collective Hello! Project, where she released her debut single "Dokki Doki! Love Mail" in 2001. Her subsequent singles, "Love Namidairo" (2001), "Momoiro Kataomoi (2002), "Yeah! Meccha Holiday" (2002) charted within the top 5 of the Oricon Weekly Singles Charts, and were certified Gold by the Recording Industry Association of Japan. Aside from her solo activities, Matsuura was also a member of the sub-groups Gomattō, Nochiura Natsumi, Def.Diva, and several Hello! Project Shuffle Units.

As an actress, Matsuura starred in the films The Blue Light (2003) and Yo-Yo Girl Cop (2006).

== Career ==
=== 2000–09: Hello! Project ===
Matsuura auditioned in 2000 for the fourth Morning Musume & Heike Michiyo Protegee Audition and was selected along with Sheki-Dol to become a part of what was later known as Hello! Project. After being chosen from that audition, Matsuura began her solo career. In time, she would become one of Hello! Project's biggest acts.

Aside from a successful solo career, Matsuura also did numerous collaborations with other members of Hello! Project, including special, usually short lived groups Gomattou with Maki Goto and Miki Fujimoto; Nochiura Natsumi with Maki Goto and Natsumi Abe; and DEF.DIVA with Maki Goto, Natsumi Abe, and Rika Ishikawa. She also did the "Folk Song" series which feature Yuko Nakazawa and other Hello! Project artists, as well as Hello! Project's shuffle groups (3nin Matsuri in 2001, Odoru 11 in 2002, Salt5 in 2003, and the larger H.P. All Stars in 2004).

She also formed the duo GAM with Miki Fujimoto in debuted September 2006. Their first single, "Thanks!" reached the #2 position on the Oricon.

Matsuura starred in the Japanese film Sukeban Deka: Codename = Asamiya Saki (known internationally as Yo-Yo Girl Cop) opposite Rika Ishikawa, released on September 30, 2006.

On October 9, 2006, both concerts she was supposed to hold that day were cancelled, as she was not feeling well. Soon several unsourced rumours emerged considering the possibility she might be suffering from Temporomandibular joint disorder. Following the cancellation of the two concerts, Matsuura's management confirmed the rumours, reported the young idol had been taking painkillers to continue working and scheduled a press conference to discuss her condition. On the following day Matsuura made a public statement on PBS apologizing to her fans and expressing her desire to get back to her singing career as soon as possible.

Since her press conference, Matsuura returned to her normal hosting duties on her weekly radio show, "Matsuura Aya no All Night Nippon" and returned to singing in a limited capacity, as demonstrated on her appearance on Hey! Hey! Hey! Music Champ on October 23, 2006.

On March 8, 2008, Matsuura—as a secret guest—performed at the opening ceremony of the Fourth Special Olympics Japan Winter National Games, a national event in preparation of the 2009 Special Olympics World Winter Games held in Boise, Idaho. She performed the song "Kizuna", which was released on May 21, 2008, as her 20th single.

=== 2008–2013: Graduation and Reshuffle ===
It was officially announced on October 19, 2008, that Matsuura would be graduating from Hello! Project along with the rest of Elder Club. Before her graduation, Matsuura released her fifth studio album, Omoi Afurete, on January 21, 2009, and her 21st single, "Chocolate Damashii", was released on February 11 for Valentine's Day.

Matsuura graduated from Hello! Project on March 31, 2009, but months later, on August 26, 2009, Matsuura launched her own blog called Ayablog and announced that her Omoi Afurete tour will be her last for two or three years. However, she has since released a Cover Album (Click You, Link Me, 2010). In late August 2011, it was revealed that she is diagnosed with endometriosis, which has been and will continue to limit her concert activities in the future. However, from 2009 to 2013, She has consistently released Acoustic Concerts, known as "Aya Matsuura's Maniac Series". She was signed to UpFront Create, along with some of the members of the Hello Project! Elder Club. At the end of the year, she performed along with all other Hello Project members at the concert "Hello! Project COUNTDOWN PARTY 2013 ~GOOD BYE & HELLO!~" where she announced her indefinite hiatus.

=== 2022-24: Return to Entertainment ===
On January 27, Matsuura was a guest on the podcast Matthew's Matthew hosted by Takashi Fujii, thus marking the end of an almost decade long hiatus. On April 14, Matsuura was featured in a commercial for Nescafe 'Excella' coffee. On August 9, Keita Tachibana announced on Twitter that a new single 'Addicted' would be released on November 25. She also provided background vocals on Mariya Takeuchi's cover of "Subject: Sayonara", which Mariya wrote, originally intended as Aya's final single release.

=== Other appearances ===
Matsuura has appeared in many commercials for various companies; notably Pretz snack foods, Epson color printers, and Kirin beverages. She has also taken part and co-hosts the television show Utawara with other names in Japanese entertainment such as Johnny Jimusho's Jun Matsumoto.

== Personal life ==
Matsuura and Keita Tachibana registered their marriage on August 4, 2013, after almost 12 years of dating. They held their wedding ceremony in Hawaii on October 7. On December 21, 2014, the couple announced the birth of their first child, a baby girl.

== Discography and releases ==
=== Studio albums ===
#	Title	Release date	Peak rank	Total sales	Weeks on chart
1	First Kiss	January 1, 2002	#2	301,530	13
2	T.W.O	January 29, 2003	#2	316,986	18
3	X3	January 1, 2004	#10	124,939	9
4	Double Rainbow (ダブル レインボウ)	October 10, 2007	#22	12,536	3
5	Omoi Afurete (想いあふれて)	January 21, 2009	#29	5,821	2

=== Cover albums ===
#	Title	Release date	Peak rank	Total sales	Weeks on chart
–	Naked Songs	November 29, 2006	#24	18,961	2
6	Click you, Link Me	November 24, 2010	#72	3,578	4

=== Compilations ===
#	Title	Release date	Peak rank	Total sales	Weeks on chart
–	Aya Matsuura Best 1 (松浦亜弥ベスト1)	March 24, 2005	#2	121,361	13
7	10th Anniversary Best	December 21, 2011	#56	3,053	2

=== Singles ===
#	Title	Release date	Peak rank	Total sales	Weeks on charts
1	"Dokki Doki! Love Mail" (ドッキドキ! Loveメール)	April 11, 2001	#10	72,070	6
2	"Tropical Koishiteru" (トロピカ～ル恋して～る)	June 13, 2001	#7	64,490	6
3	"Love Namidairo" (Love涙色)	September 5, 2001	#3	172,340	9
4	"100Kai no Kiss" (100回のKiss)	November 28, 2001	#2	102,820	7
5	"Momoiro Kataomoi" (♥ 桃色片思い ♥)	February 6, 2002	#2	225,566	13
6	"Yeah! Meccha Holiday" (Yeah! めっちゃホリディ)	May 29, 2002	#2	130,960	19
7	"The Bigaku" (The 美学)	September 19, 2002	#2	123,138	18
8	"Sōgen no Hito" (草原の人)	December 11, 2002	#2	92,995	11
9	"Ne~e?" (ね～え?)	March 12, 2003	#3	121,776	10
10	"Good Bye Natsuo" (Good Bye 夏男)	June 4, 2003	#3	88,483	11
11	"The Last Night"	September 26, 2003	#3	57,451	8
12	"Kiseki no Kaori Dance" (奇跡の香りダンス)	January 28, 2004	#3	80,322	7
13	"Hyacinth" (風信子 (ヒヤシンス))	March 10, 2004	#7	56,400	13
14	"Your Song ~Seishun Sensei~" (Your Song ~青春宣誓~); Theme song of "Aijo Ippon!"	July 14, 2004	#3	41,306	10
15	"Watarasebashi" (渡良瀬橋; "Watarase Bridge")^{†}	October 20, 2004	#6	47,857	6
–	"Tensai! Let's Go Ayayamu" (天才! Let's Go あややム); Theme song of "Hamtaro the Movie 4"	November 26, 2004	#47	–	5
16	"Zutto Suki de Ii desu ka" (ずっと 好きでいいですか)	February 23, 2005	#7	45,022	8
17	"Ki ga Tsukeba Anata" (気がつけば あなた)	September 21, 2005	#6	56,822	9
18	"Suna wo Kamu you ni... Namida" (砂を噛むように・・・Namida)	February 1, 2006	#14	20,212	5
19	"Egao" (笑顔)	August 29, 2007	#16	13,286	5
20	"Kizuna" (きずな)	May 21, 2008	#20	7,623	3
21	"Chocolate Damashii" (チョコレート魂)^{††}	February 11, 2009	#19	4,795	2
22	"Futari Osaka" (ふたり大阪)	March 29, 2011			
23	"Subject: Sayonara" (Subject: さようなら)	December 20, 2011			
24	Addicted	November 25, 2022			

^{†} A cover of Chisato Moritaka's 1993 original. The bridge in the title is one of twelve bridges that cross the Watarase River in the city of Ashikaga.

^{††} Last release within Hello! Project, as she graduated soon after its release.

=== DVDs ===
Title	Release date
Matsuura Aya First Concert Tour 2002 Haru "First Date" at Tokyo Kokusai Forum (松浦亜弥First Concert Tour 2002春「First Date」at東京国際フォーラム)	August 7, 2002
Matsuura Aya Single M Clips 1 (松浦亜弥シングルMクリップ1)	October 9, 2002
Bi-Shojo Nikki I, II (美・少女日記 I, II)	December 11, 2002
Aya no DNA (亜弥のDNA)	January 16, 2003
Yeah! Meccha Live at Nakano Sun Plaza (Yeah! めっちゃライブ at 中野サンプラザ)	February 19, 2003
Alo-Hello! (アロハロ!)	February 26, 2003
Sōgen no Hito (草原の人) – With the original casting	March 5, 2003
Ne~e? (ね～え?)	March 12, 2003
Kotomikku Daijiten Jōkan, Gekan (ことミック大辞典 上巻, 下巻)	May 2, 2003
Musical "Sōgen no Hito" (ミュージカル 「草原の人」)	May 21, 2003
Good Bye Natsuo (Good Bye 夏男)	June 4, 2003
Moero! Manābu 1, 2 (燃えろ!マナー部1, 2)	July 2, 2003
Concert Tour 2003 Haru ~Matsu Ringu Pink~ (コンサートツアー2003春～松リングPink～)	September 18, 2003
Kiseki no Kaori Dance (奇跡の香りダンス。)	January 28, 2004
Matsuura Aya Concert Tour 2003 Aki ~Ayaya Hit Parade!~ (松浦亜弥コンサートツアー2003秋 ～あややヒットパレード!～)	February 4, 2004
Matsuura Aya Single V Clips 2 (松浦亜弥シングルVクリップス2)	April 14, 2004
Musical Real Audition!! (ミュージカル リアルオーディション!!)	May 12, 2004
Alo-Hello! 2 Matsuura Aya (アロハロ!2 松浦亜弥)	July 7, 2004
Single V Your Song ~Seishun Sensei~ (シングルV Your Song ～青春宣誓～)	July 28, 2004
Matsuura Aya Concert Tour 2004 Haru ~Watashi to Watashi to Anata~ (松浦亜弥コンサートツアー2004春～私と私とあなた～)	August 11, 2004
Single V Watarasebashi (シングルV 渡良瀬橋)	November 10, 2004
Matsuura Aya Concert Tour 2004 Aki ~Matsu Crystal Yoyogi Special~ (松浦亜弥コンサートツアー2004秋 ～松クリスタル 代々木スペシャル～)	December 1, 2004
Single V Zutto Suki de Ii desu ka (シングルV ずっと 好きでいいですか)	May 2, 2005
Matsuura Aya Concert Tour 2005 Haru 101 Kaime no Kiss ~Hand in Hand~ (松浦亜弥コンサートツアー2005春 101回目のKiss～Hand in Hand～)	June 20, 2005
Single V Ki ga Tsukeba Anata (シングルV 気がつけば あなた)	September 28, 2005
Hello Pro Party! 2005 ~Matsuura Aya Captain Koen~ (ハロ☆プロ パーティ～！2005 ～松浦亜弥キャプテン公演～)	December 7, 2005
Concert Tour 2006 Spring ~Otona no Namida~ (コンサートツアー2006春~OTONA no NAMIDA~)	September 6, 2006
Aya Matsuura: Live in Shanghai (松浦亜弥 上海ライブ)	October 25, 2006
Concert Tour 2006 Fall (松浦亜弥コンサートツアー2006秋 〜進化ノ季節…〜)	January 17, 2007
Concert Tour 2007 Fall ~Double Rainbow~ (松浦亜弥コンサートツアー2007秋 〜ダブル レインボウ〜)	January 23, 2008
"AYA THE WITCH" Concert Tour Spring 2008 (松浦亜弥コンサートツアー2008春 『AYA The Witch』)	September 24, 2008
Concert Tour Fall 2009 ~Omoi Afurete~ (松浦亜弥コンサートツアー2009秋 〜想いあふれて〜)	December 23, 2009
Luxury Christmas Night 2013 at Cotton Club (松浦亜弥 ラグジュアリー・クリスマス・ナイト 2013 at COTTON CLUB)	February 11, 2015

=== Videos ===
- 2001-04-25 – Bi Shojo Nikki Part 1 (美・少女日記 1)
- 2001-06-27 – Bi Shojo Nikki Part 2 (美・少女日記 2)
- 2001-09-05 – Bi Shojo Nikki Part 3 (美・少女日記 3)
- 2001-12-12 – Bi Shojo Nikki Part 4 (美・少女日記 4)
- 2002-08-07 – Concert Tour 2002 Haru "First Date" at Tokyo Kokusai Forum (ファーストコンサートツアー2002春「ファーストデート」 at 東京国際フォーラム)
- 2002-10-09 – Matsuura Aya Single M Clips 1 (松浦亜弥シングルMクリップス1)
- 2003-02-19 – Yeah! Meccha Raibu at Nakano Sun Plaza (Yeah! めっちゃライブ at 中野サンプラザ)
- 2003-02-26 – Alo-Hello! (アロハロ!)
- 2003-03-12 – Ne~e? (ね～え?)

=== Photobooks ===
Solo photobooks

- 2001-12-01 – Matsuura Aya 1st Photobook (松浦亜弥 1st写真集)
- 2003-02-14 – Alo-Hello! (アロハロ!)
- 2004-01-15 – Ma'! Chura (まっ!ちゅら)
- 2004-06-25 – Alo-Hello! 2 (アロハロ!2)
- 2005-03-19 – a

Concert photobooks

- 2002-06-04 – First-Date (ファースト・デート)
- 2004-07-07 – ~Watashi to Watashi to Anata~ (～私と私とあなた～)

Other photobooks

- 2003-04-11 – Ayaya to Mikitty (アヤヤとミキティ)
- 2003-09-30 – Matsuura Aya in Hello! Project 2003 Summer
- 2004-03-13 – Matsuura Aya in Hello! Project 2004 Winter
- 2004-09-28 – Matsuura Aya in Hello! Project 2004 Summer
- 2005-07-06 – Nochiura Natsumi Live Photobook "Triangle Energy" (後浦なつみライブ写真集「Triangle Energy」)

== Acts ==
=== Television variety shows ===
Show	Start date	End date	Network
Hello! Morning (ハロー!モーニング。)	April 2000	April 1, 2007	TV Tokyo, etc.
Minna no TV (ミンナのテレビ)	April 13, 2005	September 28, 2005	Nippon TV and others
A	April 2005	June 26, 2005	Nippon TV and others
Utawara Hot Hit 10 → Utawara (歌笑Hotヒット10 → ウタワラ)	October 16, 2005	January 28, 2007	Nippon TV and others
Ayaya Golf (あややゴルフ)	April 4, 2006	September 26, 2006	Nippon TV
Ayaya Golf 2 (あややゴルフ2)	April 4, 2007	September 26, 2007	Nippon TV
Meringue no Kimochi (メレンゲの気持ち)	April 7, 2007	September 24, 2011	Nippon TV
Collaboration Lab. (コラボ☆ラボ 〜夢の音楽工房〜)	April 8, 2008	April 1, 2009	WOWOW

=== TV drama ===
Title	Start date	End date	Network	Role
Saigo no Kazoku (最後の家族; lit: the last family)	October 18, 2001	December 13, 2001	TV Asahi and others	Tomomi Uchiyama
Goldem Bowl (ゴールデンボウル) Episode 9	June 22, 2002		Nippon TV and others	Miyako Yoshizawa
Victory! ~Foot Girls no Seishun~ (Victory!～フットガールズの青春~)	November 22, 2003		Fuji TV and others	Shuko Ashida
Aijo Ippon! (愛情イッポン!)	July 17, 2004	September 18, 2004	Nippon TV and others	Tomoe Natsuyagi
Inochi no Kiseki (命の軌跡; lit: the miracle in life) (for the 50th anniversary of Chubu-Nippon Broadcasting Co. Ltd. starting telecasting)	October 25, 2006		CBC, TBS, and others	Yoshimi Hirai
The Quiz Show (ザ・クイズショウ)	April 18, 2009	June 24, 2009	Nippon TV and others	Rena Takasugi
Sakura and Satsuki (サクラとさつき)	April 1, 2011		ABC (only in the Kansai region)	Sakura Haruno

=== Films ===
- Ao no Honō (2003)
- Sukeban Deka: Codename = Asamiya Saki (2006)

=== Radio ===
- Matsuura Aya Let's do it!! (松浦亜弥 Let's do it!!) – JOLF, etc. (April, 2001—2005-03-27)
- Matsuura Aya All Night Nippon (松浦亜弥のオールナイトニッポン) – JOLF and other thirty-five radio stations in Japan (2005-03-30 — 2006-12-27)
- Matsuura Aya FIVE STARS– InterFM 76.1 (TUESDAY 松浦亜弥) (Start date 2007-10-02)October 2007-September 2009 (End date 2009-09-29)

=== Commercials ===
- Pretz (2002–2006, Ezaki Glico)
- Tessera (2002–2004, Shiseido)
- Gogo no Kocha (2003–2008, Kirin Beverage)
- Colorio Printer (2003–2005, Epson)
- Sega PuyoPuyo Fever (2004)
- Papico (2004–2006, Ezaki Glico)
- Pocky (2004–2005, Ezaki Glico)
- Sky PerfecTV! (2004–2005, SKY Perfect Communications)
- Super Mild (2004–2005, Shiseido)
- Scooter Let's 4 (2004–2005, Suzuki)
- Nissin Yakisoba UFO (2005–2006, Nissin)
- Aoyama Trading (Youfuku Aoyama) (2005–2008)
- Youpack (2005–2006, Japan Post)
- Scooter Address V50 (2006, Suzuki)
- Expressway ETC (2007, Organization for Road System Enhancement) -- song only
- Center-in (2007, Unicharm)
- Fried Chicken (2008, FamilyMart) -- also the song "Kichin to Chicken" lyrics and music by Fujioka Fujimaki, a folk song duo.
- Mezamashi Gohan (2009, MAFF)
- Top "Clear Liquid" (since 2009, Lion)
- Vitamin Water (since 2009, Suntory)
- Roots Aroma Impact (since 2010, JT Foods), etc.

=== Video games ===
- CR Matsuura Aya (PlayStation 2)
- Guitar Freaks 8th mix / Drummania 7th mix (Momoiro Kataomoi, covered by Yu Uchida)
- Donkey Konga (Japanese version, Momoiro Kataomoi covered by an unknown artist)
- Daigasso! Band Brothers (Yeah! Meccha Holiday, instrumental)
- Go-Go-Tea Miniature Golf (Kirin Beverage)
- Donkey Konga 2 (Japanese Version, Yeah! Meccha Holiday)
