= Miki 1 =

MIKI 1

Studio album by Miki Fujimoto
- Released: February 26, 2003
- Recorded: 2002–2003
- Genre: Japanese pop
- Length: 50:22
- Label: hachama
- Producer: Tsunku

MIKI① is the debut album of J-pop idol Miki Fujimoto, released on February 26, 2003, which was also her 18th birthday. First pressing of the album featured special packaging and a 12-page mini photo book. It featured all of her previous singles from her debut "Aenai Nagai Nichiyōbi" (released March 2002) to her single "Boogie Train '03" (released February 2003). The album also contained the single "Boyfriend", which was originally released in November 2002, her last single for that year. Five months after the release of MIKI 1, Miki made her debut in J-pop group Morning Musume to become a part of the 6th generation of members.

== Track listing ==
1. Boogie Train '03 (ブギー トレイン '03)
2. Romantic Ukare Mode (ロマンティック 浮かれ モード)
3. Eki Mae no Dai Happening (駅前 の 大 ハプニング)
4. Sotto Kuchizukete Gyutto Dakishimete (そっと 口づけて ギュット 抱きしめて)
5. Namida Girl (涙 GIRL)
6. Aenai Nagai Nichiyoubi (会えない 長い 日曜日)
7. Giniro no Eien (銀色 の 永遠)
8. Boyfriend (ボーイフレンド)
9. Mangetsu (満月)
10. Shall We Love? (Fujimoto Version)
11. Let's Do Dai Hakken! (Let's Do 大 発見!)
