= Miki Fujimoto =

Japanese actress and singer (born 1985)

Miki Fujimoto 藤本 美貴
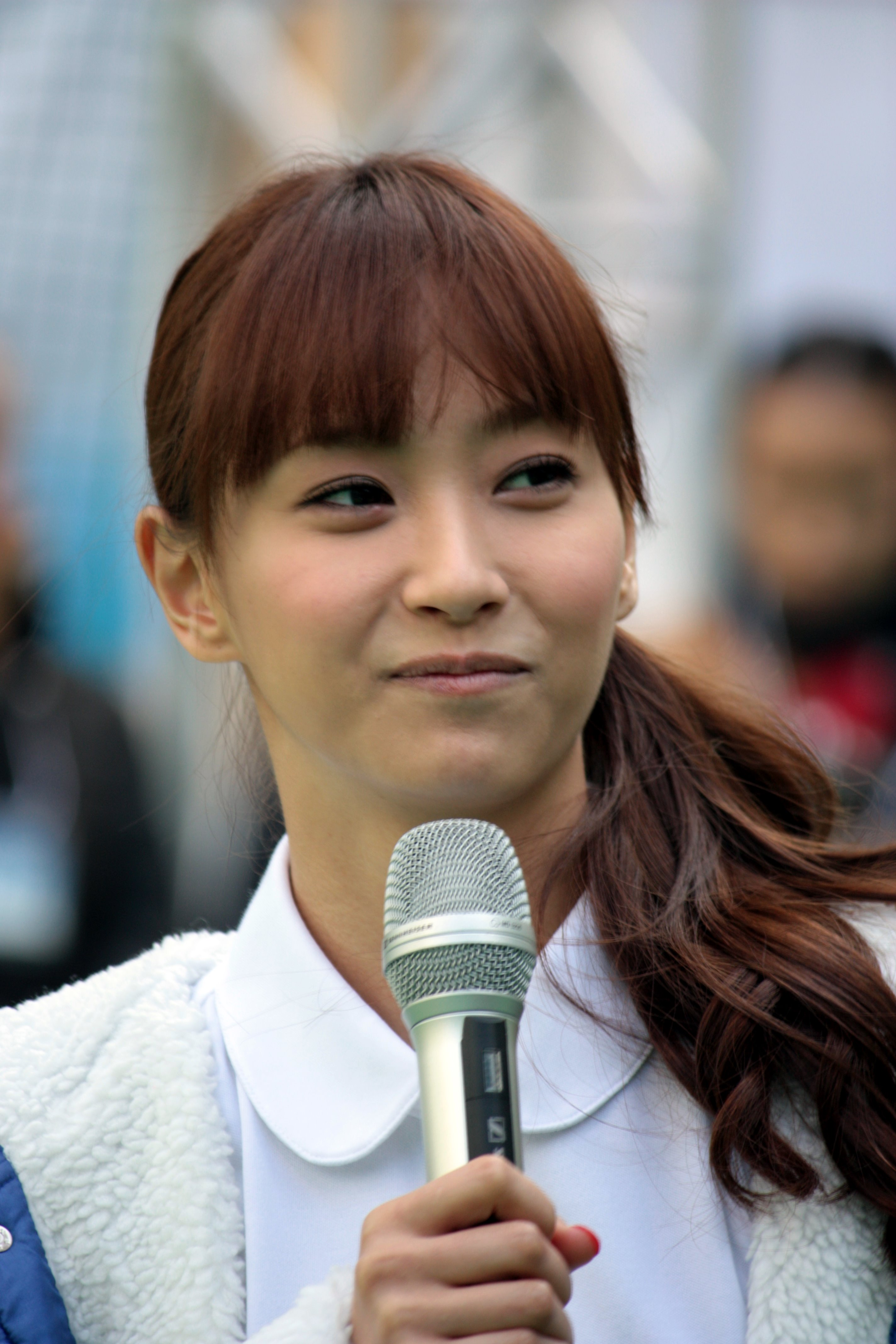
- Fujimoto in 2010

Background information
- Born: February 26, 1985 (age 41); Takikawa, Hokkaido, Japan
- Genres: J-pop
- Occupations: Actress; Singer; Dancer; Model
- Instruments: Vocals
- Years active: 2001–present
- Labels: Rice Music; UP Front Works; J.P Room
- Website: www.jp-r.co.jp/fujimotomiki

YouTube information
- Channel: @hello_mikitty
- Years active: 2019–present
- Subscribers: 732 thousand
- Views: 235.1 million
- Last updated: April 29, 2024

Miki Shōji (庄司 美貴, Shōji Miki) (born February 26, 1985), professionally known by her birth name of Miki Fujimoto (藤本 美貴, Fujimoto Miki), and nicknamed Mikitty, is a Japanese actress, singer and YouTuber. After failing the audition to join girl group Morning Musume with the fourth generation members, Fujimoto debuted as a solo artist within Hello! Project in 2002 with the single "Aenai Nagai Nichiyōbi". Fujimoto later joined Morning Musume in 2003 along with the sixth generation and eventually became the leader of the group in 2007.

== Early life ==
Fujimoto was born and raised in the Takikawa area of Hokkaidō, Japan. She is the youngest of four children: she has an older brother (who won a defamation case alongside Fujimoto in 2009), and two older sisters. Her father died on November 10, 2010.

== Career ==
=== Early work: 2002–2003 ===
Fujimoto originally started out as a solo singer in 2002 under the idol family Hello! Project, becoming the first of six members to debut under Hello! Project after losing a Morning Musume audition. She is often called by fans as Aya Matsuura's rival, but in fact, they are the best of friends. After a successful performance on the music program on New Year's Eve, "Kōhaku Uta Gassen", producer Tsunku added her to Morning Musume as a sixth generation member in 2003.

Although unintended, Fujimoto began a very brass and frigid image (which Fujimoto herself attributed to her unhappiness for being added to the group long after having been built up as a solo act). At this point in her career, she was given the nickname "Miki-sama" (美貴様、Miki the Great) by fans and the media alike due to her new image as someone who spoke her mind with a sharp tongue, even in the face of her seniors and instructors.

She sang many of the lead lines in Morning Musume songs, especially after Natsumi Abe's graduation. She and fellow Morning Musume member Asami Konno were also lent to Country Musume, a group that features "Country Girls from Hokkaidō", such as Miki and Asami (the group has been known, however, to include members not from the rural island—such as former featured singers Rika Ishikawa and Miuna Saito).

In October 2002, she was placed in the one-shot unit, Gomattou with two other prominent pop soloists under Hello! Project, Maki Goto (a former Morning Musume member), and Aya Matsuura. She was also in Hello! Project Shuffle groups Odoru 11, 11Water, H.P. All Stars and Sexy Otonajan.

In 2003, when Morning Musume was split into two groups, she was placed in Morning Musume Otomegumi.

On June 15, 2006, it was announced that Fujimoto and Aya Matsuura would join in a new Hello! Project duo called GAM. Their debut single was released on September 13, 2006, and after two other singles, their debut LP was released on May 23, 2007.

On May 6, 2007, after the graduation of then-leader Hitomi Yoshizawa, Fujimoto took her place as the fifth leader of Morning Musume.

== Controversy ==
On May 24, 2007, Fujimoto was featured in the Japanese gossip magazine Friday pictured walking with Tomoharu Shōji, a member of the comedy duo Shinagawa Shōji. Friday explained that they had a two-hour dinner together, drove to Fujimoto's apartment, then went to the sauna, returning to Shōji's apartment just after midnight. It soon became apparent that she was to be involved in a scandal that would jeopardize her position in Morning Musume. Up-Front Agency's initial response to the article was that they had no intention to deal with the situation since there was no proof of them dating.

On the May 26, 2007 edition of Young Town Doyōbi (a radio show with Ai Takahashi, Fujimoto and Sanma Akashiya), she confirmed that the pictures were of her, and confirmed her relationship with Shōji. Fujimoto was later called by the head of Up-Front Agency, Naoki Yamazaki, about the situation. Instead of ordering her to end the relationship, the agency left the decision to Fujimoto. Since she had no desire of ending the relationship, and she did not want to further betray the staff, fellow members, and her fans, she decided the best course of action would be to immediately resign from the group.

On June 1, 2007, Fujimoto announced her immediate resignation from Morning Musume. However, she remained with GAM (finishing their tour in progress at the time) and remained contracted with Hello! Project and Up-Front Agency.

Fujimoto's tenure as leader of Morning Musume of just 25 days remains a record within Hello! Project, and has become a source of notoriety within Japanese media.

== Personal life ==
In March 2009, Fujimoto announced her engagement to Shōji and graduated from Hello! Project. They married on July 3, 2009, at a ceremony held in Hawaii. The couple have three children: a son born in 2012, and two daughters born in 2015 and 2020.

== Later career ==
On April 23, 2008, Fujimoto released a collaboration kayōkyoku single, "Okitegami" (置き手紙, lit. Leftover Letter), featuring Takao Horiuchi. Later that year, Fujimoto played the part of Rizzo in the fall musical, Grease.

In 2011, Fujimoto took part of the special revival unit Dream Morning Musume, though her concert and television appearances were limited, due to her concurrent pregnancy (with her first child).

Fujimoto had a brief stint as an owner of a chain of yakiniku restaurants in Japan: Yakiniku Mikitei (焼肉美貴亭). The first location opened on her 26th birthday, February 26, 2011, to much success. Three more restaurants were opened. The restaurant chain, however, was short-lived, and closed on June 29, 2012, following various incidents.

In 2017, Fujimoto appeared in the film Kamen Rider Ex-Aid the Movie: True Ending.

In October 2019, Fujimoto opened her YouTube channel: Hello! Mikitty. Her husband often appears in her videos, with frequent appearances by former Hello! Project members, and her three children.

On March 12, 2023, in celebration of her 21st Debut Anniversary, Fujimoto held a 20 Complete Years Anniversary Live Concert at Huric Hall Tokyo, featuring Asami Konno and Reina Tanaka as special guests, with surprise appearances by Maki Goto and Ichiro Ito (of Every Little Thing).

== Discography and releases ==
=== Albums ===
Title	Release date	First week sales	Total sales
Miki 1	2003-02-26	93,475	128,502

=== Singles ===
Title	Release date	First week sales	Total sales
"Aenai Nagai Nichiyōbi" (会えない長い日曜日)	2002-03-13	25,610	43,670
"Sotto Kuchizukete Gyutto Dakishimete" (そっと口づけてギュッと抱きしめて)	2002-06-12	24,730	40,450
"Romantic Ukare Mode" (ロマンティック浮かれモード)	2002-09-04	38,490	62,000
"Boyfriend" (ボーイフレンド)	a 2002-11-07	36,290	48,555
"Boogie Train '03" (ブギートレイン'03)	2003-02-05	37,410	50,737
"Okitegami" (置き手紙, lit. Leftover Letter)	2008-04-23	5,771	22,889

=== DVDs ===
Title	Release date
Fujimoto Single M Clips 1 (藤本シングルMクリップス①)	2002-10-02
Alo! Hello Fujimoto Miki (アロハロ！藤本美貴)	2003-04-25
Fujimoto Miki First Live Tour 2003 Spring: Miki 1 (藤本美貴 First Live Tour 2003 Spring ～Miki①～)	2003-06-18

=== Photobooks ===
Title	Release date	Publisher	ISBN	Photobook information
Ayaya to Mikitty (アヤヤとミキティ, Ayaya and Mikitty)	2003-04-11	Wani Books	ISBN 4-8470-2761-2	Photobook with Aya Matsuura.
Alo Hello! Fujimoto Miki (アロハロ!藤本美貴写真集)	2003-04-22	Kadokawa Shoten	ISBN 4-04-853590-0	First solo photobook.
Mikitty (藤本美貴写真集 「Mikitty」)	2004-01-24	Wani Books	ISBN 4-8470-2793-0	Second solo photobook.
Real 226 (藤本美貴写真集「リアル226」)	2005-02-25	Wani Books	ISBN 4-8470-2846-5	Third solo photobook.
Cheri (藤本美貴写真集「cheri（シェリー）」)	2005-12-17	Wani Books	ISBN 4-8470-2905-4	Fourth solo photobook.
Coeur (藤本美貴写真集「COEUR」)	2006-11-25	Wani Books	ISBN 4-8470-2972-0	Fifth solo photobook.

== Acting ==
=== Movies ===
- 2003 – 17sai ~Tabidachi no Futari~ (17才～旅立ちのふたり～)
- 2017 – Kamen Rider Ex-Aid the Movie: True Ending

=== Theatrical animation ===
- 2023 – Doraemon: Nobita's Sky Utopia – Paradapia Teacher
- 2025 – Doraemon: Nobita's Art World Tales – Queen Arturia

=== Dramas ===
- 2002 – Tenshi no Utagoe: Shōnibyōtō no Kiseki (天使の歌声～小児病棟の奇跡～)
- 2004 – Shinshun Wide Jidaigeki: Ryuuma ga Yuku (新春ワイド時代劇 竜馬がゆく)
- 2009 – Daremo Mamorenai (誰も守れない)
- 2009 – Reset Dai 6wa "Kazoku no Futatsu no Wakaremichi" (RESET第6話『家族の二つの分かれ道』)

=== Theater ===
- 2008 – Hakana "Itoshi no Hakana" yori (HAKANA「いとしの儚」より）～)

=== Musicals ===
- 2006 – Ribbon no Kishi: The Musical (リボンの騎士ザ・ミュージカル) as Hecate
- 2008 – Grease: The Musical as Rizzo

=== Radio ===
- 2002–2003 – Fujimoto Miki Heart Days Radio (藤本美貴 ハート・デイズ・レディオ)
- 2002–2007 – Fujimoto Miki no Dokimiki Night (藤本美貴のドキ♥みきNight)
- 2004–2007 – Young Town Doyōbi (ヤングタウン土曜日)
