= Berryz Kobo discography =

- Studio albums: 9
- Extended plays: 1
- Compilation albums: 2
- Singles: 35
- Music videos: 34

As of June 2014, the discography of Berryz Kobo consists of nine studio albums, and thirty-five singles. They are under Sharam Q vocalist Tsunku, who serves as their lyricist, composer, and producer.

== Singles ==
#	Title	Release date	Chart position		Sales (Oricon)		Notes
#	Title	Release date	Oricon Weekly Singles Chart	Billboard Japan Hot 100*	First week	Total***	Notes
1	"Anata Nashi de wa Ikite Yukenai" (あなたなしでは生きてゆけない)	March 3, 2004	18		9,252	15,315	
2	"Fighting Pose wa Date ja Nai!" (ファイティングポーズはダテじゃない!, Faitingu Pōzu wa Date ja Nai!)	April 28, 2004	25		6,783	9,634	
3	"Piriri to Yukō!" (ピリリと行こう!)	May 26, 2004	37		7,883	10,476	
4	"Happiness (Kōfuku Kangei!)" (ハピネス～幸福歓迎！～, Hapinesu ~Kōfuku Kangei!~)	August 25, 2004	20		10,529	13,691	
5	"Koi no Jubaku" (恋の呪縛)	November 10, 2004	13		12,897	16,436	
6	"Special Generation" (スッペシャル ジェネレ～ション, Supesharu Jenerēshon)	March 30, 2005	7		19,814	24,449	
7	"Nanchū Koi o Yatterū You Know?" (なんちゅう恋をやってるぅ You Know?)	June 8, 2005	13		17,787	19,804	Ending theme of the Kids Station anime Patalliro Saiyūki
8	"21ji made no Cinderella" (21時までのシンデレラ)	August 3, 2005	13		17,648	20,464	Last single to feature Maiha Ishimura
9	"Gag 100kaibun Aishite Kudasai" (ギャグ100回分愛してください)	November 23, 2005	19		12,538	16,779	Ending theme of Pretty Cure Max Heart Movie 2
10	"Jiriri Kiteru" (ジリリ キテル)	March 29, 2006	6		14,727	19,273	
11	"Waratchaō yo Boyfriend" (笑っちゃおうよ Boyfriend)	August 2, 2006	15		17,381	20,325	
12	"Munasawagi Scarlet" (胸さわぎスカーレット, Munasawagi Sukāretto)	December 6, 2006	11		19,292	23,090	
13	"Very Beauty"	March 7, 2007	11		16,625	20,227	
14	"Kokuhaku no Funsui Hiroba" (告白の噴水広場)	June 27, 2007	4		22,442	24,489	
15	"Tsukiatteru no ni Kataomoi" (付き合ってるのに片思い)	November 28, 2007	6		28,307	31,787	
16	"Dschinghis Khan" (ジンギスカン, Jingisu Kan)	March 12, 2008	5		30,667	37,096	
17	"Yuke Yuke Monkey Dance" (行け 行け モンキーダンス, Yuke Yuke Monkī Dansu)	July 9, 2008	4		29,936	33,017	
18	"Madayade"	November 5, 2008	6		22,861	25,469	
19	"Dakishimete Dakishimete" (抱きしめて 抱きしめて)	March 11, 2009	8		24,786	27,797	
20	"Seishun Bus Guide / Rival" (青春バスガイド/ライバル, Seishun Basu Gaido/Raibaru)	June 3, 2009	4		29,169	34,589	"Seishun Bus Guide" is an ending theme of Inazuma Eleven
21	"Watashi no Mirai no Danna-sama / Ryūsei Boy" (私の未来のだんな様/流星ボーイ)	November 11, 2009	5		30,517	36,756	"Ending theme of Inazuma Eleven
22	"Otakebi Boy Wao! / Tomodachi wa Tomodachi Nanda!" (雄叫びボーイ Wao!/友達は友達なんだ!)	March 3, 2010	3		25,197	35,002	"Ending theme of Inazuma Eleven
23	"Maji Bomber!!" (本気ボンバー!!, Maji Bonbā!!)	July 14, 2010	6		13,958	22,641	Ending theme of Inazuma Eleven
24	"Shining Power" (シャイニング パワー, Shainingu Pawā)	November 10, 2010	7		23,450	27,402	Ending theme of Inazuma Eleven
25	"Heroine ni Narō ka!" (ヒロインになろうか!, Hiroin ni Narō ka!)	March 2, 2011	7	19	22,428	24,065	
26	"Ai no Dangan" (愛の弾丸)	June 8, 2011	11		18,526	20,100	
27	"Aa, Yo ga Akeru" (ああ、夜が明ける)	August 10, 2011	7		16,307	17,643	
28	"Be Genki (Naseba Naru!)" (Be 元気＜成せば成るっ!＞)	March 21, 2012	9	30	15,555	17,144	
29	"Cha Cha Sing"	July 25, 2012	6	17	29,099	33,001	Cover of the song "Row Mah Sing" by Thongchai McIntyre
30	"Want!"	December 19, 2012	3		24,622	28,157	
31	"Asian Celebration" (アジアン セレブレイション, Ajian Serebureishon)	March 13, 2013	8		28,218	31,071	
32	"Golden Chinatown / Sayonara Usotsuki no Watashi" (ゴールデンチャイナタウン/サヨナラ ウソつきの私)	June 19, 2013	6		31,558	36,023	
33	"Motto Zutto Issho ni Itakatta / Rock Érotique" (もっとずっと一緒に居たかった/ROCKエロティック)	October 2, 2013	4		36,950	42,094	
34	"Otona na no yo! / 1oku 3zenman Sō Diet Ōkoku" (大人なのよ！／1億3千万総ダイエット王国)	February 19, 2014	4	10	30,229	31,816	
35	"Ai wa Itsumo Kimi no Naka ni / Futsū, Idol 10nen Yatterannai Desho!?" (愛はいつも君の中に／普通、アイドル10年やってらんないでしょ！)	June 4, 2014	3	18	44,219	46,608	
36	"Romance o Katatte / Towa no Uta" (ロマンスを語って/永久の歌)	November 12, 2014	2		77,285	80,000+	

* Billboard Japan Hot 100 is published since January 2008, RIAJ Digital Track Chart established in April 2009 and cancelled in July 2012.
*** These are unofficial figures obtained by adding together Oricon sales numbers for different periods of time when the single charted on Oricon.

== Albums ==
#	Title	Release date	Chart position	Notes
#	Title	Release date	Oricon Weekly Albums Chart	Notes
1	1st Chō Berryz (1st 超ベリーズ)	July 7, 2004	18	
2	Dai 2 Seichōki (第②成長記)	November 16, 2005	19	
2.5	Special! Best Mini: 2.5 Maime no Kare (スッペシャル!ベストミニ ～2.5枚目の彼～)	December 7, 2005	45	Mini-album
3	3 Natsu Natsu Mini Berryz (③夏夏ミニベリーズ)	July 5, 2006	20	Mini-album
4	4th Ai no Nanchara Shisū (4th 愛のなんちゃら指数)	August 1, 2007	14	
5	5 (Five)	September 10, 2008	11	
—	Berryz Kobo Special Best Vol. 1 (Berryz工房 スッペシャル ベスト Vol.1)	January 14, 2009	11	Compilation
6	6th Otakebi Album (6th 雄叫びアルバム)	March 31, 2010	12	
7	7 Berryz Times (7 Berryz タイムス)	March 30, 2011	10	
8	Ai no Album 8 (愛のアルバム⑧)	February 22, 2012	25	
9	Berryz Mansion 9kai (Berryzマンション９階)	January 30, 2013	24	
—	Berryz Kobo Special Best Vol. 2 (Berryz工房 スッペシャル ベスト Vol.2)	February 26, 2014	26	Compilation
—	Kanjuku Berryz Kobo: The Final Completion Box (完熟Berryz工房 The Final Completion Box)	January 21, 2015	5	Compilation

== DVDs ==
#	Title	Release вate	Contents
Concerts
1	2004 Natsu First Concert Tour ~W Standby! Double You & Berryz Kobo! (2004夏 ファーストコンサートツアー～Wスタンバイ!ダブルユー&ベリーズ工房!)	November 17, 2004	
2	2005 Shoka Hatsutandoku: Marugoto (ライブツアー2005 初夏 初単独～まるごと～)	September 22, 2005	
3	2005nen Natsu W & Berryz Kobo Concert Tour High Score! (コンサートツアー「High Score!」)	November 9, 2005	
4	Berryz Kobo Live Tour 2005 Aki: Switch On! (ライブツアー 2005秋 ～スイッチ On!～)	December 28, 2005	
5	Berryz Kobo Concert Tour 2006 Haru: Nyoki Nyoki Champion! (コンサートツアー2006春～にょきにょきチャンピオン！～)	July 19, 2006	
6	Berryz Kobo Summer Concert 2006: Natsu Natsu (Anata wo Suki ninaru Sangensoku) (サマーコンサートツアー2006『夏夏!~あなたを好きになる三原則~』)	October 25, 2006	
7	Berryz Concert Tour 2007 Sakura Mankai Berryz Kobo Live: Kono Kandō wa Nidoto nai Shunkan de Aru! (Berryz Concert Tour 2007 Cherry Trees in Full Bloom Berryz Kobo Live - This is a Once in a Lifetime Event!) (2007 桜満開 Berryz工房ライブ～この感動は二度とない瞬間である！～)	June 27, 2007	
8	Berryz Kobo Concert Tour 2007 Natsu: Welcome! Berryz Kyouden: (Berryz工房コンサートツアー 2007夏 〜ウェルカム!Berryz宮殿〜)	October 31, 2007	
9	Berryz Kobo & °C-ute; Nakayoshi Battle Concert Tour 2008 Haru: Berryz Kamen vs Cutie Ranger with Berryz Kobo tracks (Berryz工房&°C-ute 仲良しバトルコンサートツアー 2008春 〜Berryz仮面 vs キューティーレンジャー〜 with Berryz工房 Tracks)	July 16, 2008	
10	Berryz Kobo Concert Tour 2008 Aki: Berikore! (Berryz工房コンサートツアー 2008秋 〜ベリコレ!〜)	December 17, 2008	
11	Berryz Kobo Concert Tour 2009 Haru: Sono Subete no Ai ni (Berryz工房コンサートツアー 2009春 〜そのすべての愛に〜)	July 29, 2009	
12	Berryz Kobo Concert Tour 2009 Aki: Medachitai!! (Berryz工房コンサートツアー 2009秋 〜目立ちたいっ!!〜)	February 10, 2010	
13	Berryz Kobo Festival: Youkoso Otakebi Land e (Berryz工房 フェスティバル 〜ようこそ雄叫びランドへ〜)	June 23, 2010	
14	Berryz Kobo Concert Tour 2010 Shoka: Umi no ie Otakebi House (Berryz工房コンサートツアー 2010初夏 〜海の家 雄叫びハウス〜)	due August 25, 2010	
Music Video Compilations
1	Berryz Kobo Single V Clips 1 (Berryz工房シングルVクリップス①)	December 15, 2004	
2	Berryz Kobo Single V Clips 2 (Berryz工房シングルVクリップス②)	February 22, 2006	
3	Berryz Kobo Single V Clips 3 (Berryz工房シングルVクリップス③)	December 12, 2007	
4	Berryz Kobo Single V Clips 4 (Berryz工房シングルVクリップス④)	December 2, 2009	
Theatre
1	Hello! Project: Edo kara Chakushin!? Timeslip to Kengai (江戸から着信!?～タイムスリップto圏外!～)	January 17, 2007	
Television shows
—	Berikyuu! Vol. 1 (ベリキュー！Vol.1)	May 27, 2009	Berryz Kobo, °C-ute
—	Berikyuu! Vol. 2 (ベリキュー！Vol.2)	May 27, 2009	Berryz Kobo, °C-ute
—	Berikyuu! Vol. 3 (ベリキュー！Vol.3)	June 24, 2009	Berryz Kobo, °C-ute
—	Berikyuu! Vol. 4 (ベリキュー！Vol.4)	June 24, 2009	Berryz Kobo, °C-ute
—	Berikyuu! Vol. 5 (ベリキュー！Vol.5)	July 22, 2009	Berryz Kobo, °C-ute
—	Berikyuu! Vol. 6 (ベリキュー！Vol.6)	July 22, 2009	Berryz Kobo, °C-ute
—	Berikyuu! Vol. 7 (ベリキュー！Vol.7)	August 26, 2009	Berryz Kobo, °C-ute
—	Berikyuu! Vol. 8 (ベリキュー！Vol.8)	August 26, 2009	Berryz Kobo, °C-ute
Other

== Filmography ==
=== Television ===
- Yoroshiku! Senpai (よろしく！先輩) (2004-01-04–2004-04-02)
- Futarigoto (二人ゴト) (2004-04-05–2004-10-01)

=== Radio ===
- Berryz Kobo Kiritsu! Rei! Chakuseki! (Berryz工房 起立! 礼! 着席!) (2004-03-30–)

== Concert tours ==
2004

- 2004 Natsu First Concert Tour: W Standby! Double You & Berryz Kobo! (2004年夏ファーストコンサートツアー～Wスタンバイ!ダブルユー＆ベリ－ズ工房!～)

2005

- Berryz Kobo Live Tour 2005 Shoka Hatsu Tandoku: Marugoto (Berryz工房ライブツアー2005初夏 初単独 ～まるごと～)
- 2005 Natsu W & Berryz Kobo Natsu Concert Tour "High Score!" (2005年夏 W&Berryz工房 コンサートツアー 『HIGH SCORE!』)
- Berryz Kobo Concert Tour 2005 Aki: Switch On! (Berryz工房コンサートツアー2005秋 ～スイッチ ON!～)

2006

- Concert Tour 2006 Haru: Nyoki Nyoki Champion! (コンサートツアー2006春～にょきにょきチャンピオン！～)
- Summer Concert Tour 2006 "Natsu Natsu! Anata o Suki ni Naru San Gensoku!" (サマーコンサートツアー2006『夏夏!～あなたを好きになる三原則～』)

2007

- Berryz Kobo Concert Tour 2007 Natsu: Welcome! Berryz Kyūden (Berryz工房コンサートツアー2007夏 ～ウェルカム！Berryz宮殿～)

2008

- Berryz Kobo Concert Tour 2008 Autumn: Berikore!
- 2008 Asia Song Festival

2009

- Berryz Kobo Concert Tour 2009 Haru: Sono Subete no Ai ni
- Berryz Kobo Concert Tour 2009 Aki: Medachitai!!

2010

- Berryz Kobo First Live in Bangkok
- Berryz Koubou concert tour 2010 Shoka: Umi no Ie Otakebi House
- Berryz Koubou 2010 Fest

2011

- Berryz Kobo Kessei 7 Shuunen Kinen Concert Tour 2011 Haru: Shuukan Berryz Times
- Berryz Koubou & °C-ute Collaboration Concert Tour 2011 Autumn: BeriKyuu Island

2012

- Berryz Koubou Concert Tour 2012 Haru: Berryz Station

2013

- Berryz Koubou Concert Tour 2013 Haru: Berryz Mansion Nyuukyosha Boshuuchuu!

== Bibliography ==
=== Photobooks ===
- May 20, 2005 – 1st Shashinshū "Berryz Kobo" (1st写真集「Berryz工房」)
- August 2, 2005 – "Seasonz"
- August 25, 2005 – "Marugoto" - Berryz Kobo First Live Photobook (「まるごと」)
- December 2, 2005 – "Switch On" - Berryz Kobo Live Photobook (「スイッチON」)
- July 5, 2006 – "Nyoki Nyoki Champion" - Berryz Kobo Live Photobook (「にょきにょきチャンピオン」)
- March 3, 201 – "Berryz Kobo 7 Shuunen Kinen Photobook" (Berryz Kobo 7th anniversary Photobook)
