= Berryz Kobo Special Best Vol. 1 =

Album by Berryz Kobo

Compilation album by Berryz Kobo
- Released: 14 January 2009 (Japan)
- Genres: J-pop, pop
- Label: Piccolo Town
- Producer: Tsunku

Berryz Kobo chronology
5 (FIVE) (2009)	Berryz Kobo Special Best Vol. 1 (2009)	6th Otakebi Album (2010)

Singles from Berry Kobo Special Best Vol. 1
- 1. "Anata Nashi de wa Ikite Yukenai (1st)" Released: 3 March 2004; 2. "Piriri to Yukō! (3rd)" Released: 26 May 2004; 3. "Koi no Jubaku (5th)" Released: 10 November 2004; 4. "Special Generation (6th)" Released: 3 March 2005; 5. "Nanchū Koi o Yatterū You Know? (7th)" Released: 8 June 2005; 6. "Jiriri Kiteru (10th)" Released: 28 March 2006; 7. "Waratchaō yo Boyfriend (11th)" Released: 2 August 2006; 8. "Tsukiatteru no ni Kataomoi (15th)" Released: 28 November 2007; 9. "Dschinghis Khan (16th)" Released: 12 March 2008; 10. "Yuke Yuke Monkey Dance (17th)" Released: 9 July 2008; 11. "Madayade (18th)" Released: 5 November 2008

Berryz Kobo Special Best Vol. 1 (Berryz工房 スッペシャル ベスト Vol.1) is the first compilation album by the Japanese girl Japanese idol group Berryz Kobo, released in Japan on 14 January 2009 on the record label Piccolo Town.

The CD appeared less than two months before Berryz Kobo's fifth anniversary. It contained material selected from 18 singles and 6 albums the group had released so far. There's also one new track, "Otoko no Ko", which opens the album. All songs on the compilation, except one ("Dschinghis Khan", which is a cover of the German band of the same name), are written and produced by Tsunku.

The album was released in two editions: regular (PKCP-5132) and limited (PKCP-5130/1). The Limited Edition came with a DVD containing bonus videos, while the first press of the Regular Edition had a bonus photo card sealed in. The album debuted at number 4 in the Oricon Daily Albums Chart and eventually ranked eleventh for the week. "Madayade" is the only Berryz Kobo's hit that cannot be found on any other album of theirs to date.

== Members ==
- Saki Shimizu
- Momoko Tsugunaga
- Chinami Tokunaga
- Miyabi Natsuyaki
- Maasa Sudo
- Yurina Kumai
- Risako Sugaya
- Maiha Ishimura (uncredited)

== Track listing ==
CD
No.	Title	Length
1.	"Otoko-no-Ko" (男の子)
2.	"Anata Nashi de wa Ikite Yukenai" (あなたなしでは生きてゆけない)
3.	"Piriri to Yukō!" (ピリリと行こう!)
4.	"Semi" (蝉)
5.	"Today Is My Birthday"
6.	"Yūjō Junjō oh Seishun" (友情 純情 oh 青春)
7.	"Koi no Jubaku" (恋の呪縛)
8.	"Special Generation" (スッペシャル ジェネレ～ション)
9.	"Nanchū Koi o Yatterū You Know?" (なんちゅう恋をやってるぅYOU KNOW?)
10.	"Sabori" (さぼり)
11.	"Jiriri Kiteru" (ジリリ キテル)
12.	"Waratchaō yo Boyfriend" (笑っちゃおうよBOYFRIEND)
13.	"Omoitattara Kichi Desse! (Chinami Tokunaga, Maasa Sudō, Yurina Kumai)" (思い立ったら吉でっせ！)
14.	"Tsukiatteru no ni Kataomoi" (付き合ってるのに片思い)
15.	"Dschinghis Khan" (ジンギスカン)
16.	"Yuke Yuke Monkey Dance" (行け行け モンキーダンス)
17.	"Madayade"
18.	"BE"

Limited Edition DVD
No.	Title	Length
1.	"Opening" (オープニング)
2.	"Clap!"
3.	"Furare Pattern" (フラれパターン)
4.	"MC"
5.	"Madayade"
6.	"Akushukai" ((握手会; lit. 'Handshake meeting'))

== Charts ==
Chart (2009)	Peak position	Weeks on chart	Sales	
Chart (2009)	Peak position	Weeks on chart	First week	Total
Japan (Oricon Daily Albums Chart)	4			
Japan (Oricon Weekly Albums Chart)	11	4	9,905	13,163
