= Berryz Kobo Special Best Vol. 2 =

Berryz Kōbō Special Best Vol. 2

Compilation album by Berryz Kobo
- Released: February 26, 2014 (JP)
- Genres: J-pop; dance-pop; electropop
- Label: Piccolo Town
- Producer: Tsunku

Berryz Kobo chronology
Berryz Mansion 9kai (2013)	Berryz Kōbō Special Best Vol. 2 (2014)	Kanjuku Berryz Kōbō The Final Completion Box (2015)

Singles from Berryz Kōbō Special Best Vol. 2
- 1. "Asian Celebration" Released: March 13, 2013; 2. "Golden Chinatown / Sayonara Usotsuki no Watashi" Released: June 19, 2013; 3. "Motto Zutto Issho ni Itakatta / Rock Érotique" Released: October 2, 2013

Berryz Kobo Special Best Vol. 2 (Berryz工房 スッペシャル ベスト Vol．2) is the second greatest hits album by Japanese girl idol group Berryz Kobo. It was released on 26 February 2014 on the label Piccolo Town.

== Release ==
The album was released in 2 versions: a regular edition and a limited edition. The limited edition included an additional DVD.

The album contains 17 tracks on the CD: 15 tracks that had been released before and 2 new songs. The 15 previously released tracks are in reverse chronological order of release.

== Chart performance ==
The album debuted at number 26 in the Japanese Oricon weekly albums chart.

== Personnel ==
Members of Beryz Kobo:

- Saki Shimizu
- Momoko Tsugunaga
- Chinami Tokunaga
- Miyabi Natsuyaki
- Masa Sudo
- Yurina Kumai
- Risako Sugaya

== Track listing ==
CD (same in all editions)
No.	Title	Notes	Length
1.	"Motto Zutto Issho ni Itakatta" (もっとずっと一緒に居たかった)	First A-side of the 33rd single
2.	"Golden Chinatown" (ゴールデンチャイナタウン)	First A-side of the 32nd single
3.	"Asian Celebration" (アジアン セレブレイション)	31st single
4.	"Anata Nashi de wa Ikite Yukenai (2013 Ver.)" (あなたなしでは生きてゆけない...)	From the album Berryz Mansion 9 Kai; it is a new version of the song originally released as the title track of the group's debut single "Anata Nashi de wa Ikite Yukenai"
5.	"Succha ka Meccha kā" (すっちゃかめっちゃか～)	From the album Berryz Mansion 9 Kai
6.	"Want!" (WANT!)	30th single
7.	"Cha Cha Sing" (cha cha SING)	29th single
8.	"Be Genki (Naseba Naru!)" (Be 元気＜成せば成るっ！＞)	28th single
9.	"Yo no Naka Barairo" (世の中薔薇色)	From the album Ai no Album 8
10.	"Heroine ni Narō ka!" (ヒロインになろうか！)	25th single
11.	"Kimi no Tomodachi" (君の友達)	From the album 6th Otakebi Album
12.	"Tomodachi wa Tomodachi Nanda!" (友達は友達なんだ！)	Second A-side of the 22nd single
13.	"Rival" (ライバル)	Second A-side of the 20th single
14.	"Dakishimete Dakishimete" (抱きしめて 抱きしめて)	19th single
15.	"Happiness (Kōfuku Kangei!)" (ハピネス～幸福歓迎！～)	4th single
16.	"Koiseyo!" (コイセヨ！)	New song
17.	"Onna no Ko ni Shika Wakannai Chōdo ga Aru no" (女の子にしかわかんない丁度があるの)	New song

DVD (comes with the Limited Edition only)
No.	Title	Length
1.	"Long interview" (ロングインタビュー)
2.	"Special Generation (Budokan Live Ver.)" (スッペシャル ジェネレ～ション（武道館Live ver.）)

== Charts ==
Chart (2014)	Peak position
Japan (Oricon Weekly Albums Chart)	26
