= 4th Ai no Nanchara Shisū =

- Limited edition cover

Studio album by Berryz Kobo
- Released: 1 August 2007
- Recorded: 2007
- Genre: J-pop
- Length: 44:07
- Label: Piccolo Town
- Producer: Tsunku

Berryz Kobo chronology
3 Natsu Natsu Mini Berryz (2006)	4th Ai no Nanchara Shisū (2007)	5 (Five) (2008)

Singles from 4th Ai no Nanchara Shisū
- 1. "Waratchaō yo Boyfriend" Released: 2 August 2006; 2. "Munasawagi Scarlet" Released: 6 December 2006; 3. "Very Beauty" Released: 7 March 2007; 4. "Kokuhaku no Funsui Hiroba" Released: 27 June 2007

4th Ai no Nanchara Shisū (4th 愛のなんちゃら指数, Fōsu Ai no Nanchara Shisū; 4th So-and-So Index of Love) is the 4th album by J-pop idol group Berryz Kobo, released in Japan on 1 August 2007 and in South Korea on 25 May 2008. The first press of the CD came with 8 interchangeable covers, as well as solo shots of each of the 7 members.

== Track listings ==
=== CD ===
1. "Ai no Suki Suki Shisū Jōshōchū" (愛のスキスキ指数 上昇中, The Love-Love Index of Love is On the Rise)
2. "Munasawagi Scarlet" (胸さわぎスカーレット, Scarlet Premonition)
3. "Omoitattara Kichi desse!" (思い立ったら 吉でっせ!, When It Resolves, Luck Follows!)
  - Performed by Chinami Tokunaga, Maasa Sudo and Yurina Kumai.
4. "Very Beauty"
5. "Waratchaō yo Boyfriend" (笑っちゃおうよ BOYFRIEND, Let's Laugh It Out, Boyfriend)
6. "Watashi ga Suru Koto nai Hodo Zenbu Shite Kureru Kare" (私がすることない程 全部してくれる彼, He Does it All As Much As I Do Nothing)
  - Performed by Momoko Tsugunaga and Risako Sugaya.
7. "Sayonara Hageshiki Koi" (サヨナラ 激しき恋, Goodbye, Tempestuous Love)
8. "Kokuhaku no Funsui Hiroba" (告白の噴水広場, Fountain Plaza of my Confession)
9. "Sprinter!" (スプリンター!)
  - Performed by Saki Shimizu and Miyabi Natsuyaki.
10. "Sakura wa Raku sa" (サクラハラクサ, The Cherry Blossoms are Comfortable)
11. "Sakura→Nyūgakushiki" (桜→入学式, Cherry Blossoms -> School Entrance Ceremony)

=== Limited edition DVD ===
1. "Munasawagi Scarlet" (胸さわぎスカーレット)
2. "Very Beauty"
3. "Waratchaou yo Boyfriend" (笑っちゃおうよ BOYFRIEND)

== Featured line-up ==
- Saki Shimizu
- Momoko Tsugunaga
- Chinami Tokunaga
- Miyabi Natsuyaki
- Maasa Sudo
- Yurina Kumai
- Risako Sugaya

== Charts ==
Chart (2007)	Peak position	Weeks on chart	Sales	
Chart (2007)	Peak position	Weeks on chart	First week	Total
Japan (Oricon Daily Albums Chart)	5			
Japan (Oricon Weekly Albums Chart)	14	3	11,646	14,297
