= Special! Best Mini: 2.5 Maime no Kare =

Special! Best Mini ~2.5 Maime no Kare~

EP by Berryz Kobo
- Released: 7 December 2005
- Recorded: 2004–2005
- Genre: J-pop
- Length: 22:50
- Label: Piccolo Town
- Producer: Tsunku

Berryz Kobo chronology
Dai 2 Seichōki (2005)	Special! Best Mini ~2.5 Maime no Kare~ (2005)	3 Natsu Natsu Mini Berryz (2006)

Singles from Special! Best Mini: 2.5 Maime no Kare
- 1. "Anata Nashi de wa Ikite Yukenai" Released: 3 March 2004; 2. "Piriri to Yukō!" Released: 26 May 2004; 3. "Special Generation" Released: 3 March 2005; 4. "21ji made no Cinderella" Released: 3 August 2005; 5. "Gag 100kaibun Aishite Kudasai" Released: 23 November 2005

Music videos
- Anata Nashi de wa Ikite Yukenai on YouTube
- Piriri to Yukō! on YouTube
- Special Generation on YouTube
- 21ji made no Cinderella on YouTube
- Gag 100kaibun Aishite Kudasai on YouTube

Special! Best Mini: 2.5 Maime no Kare (スッペシャル!ベストミニ ～2.5枚目の彼～, Supesharu! Besuto Mini ~Ni-ten-go Maime no Kare~) is an extended play CD released by girl idol group Berryz Kobo on 7 December 2005. It is the third of three releases issued by the band in the space of four weeks, along with their second album Dai 2 Seichōki and the ninth single "Gag 100kaibun Aishite Kudasai". "2.5" is pronounced nī ten go.

The EP contains five previously released tracks in the aforementioned ninth single's A-side, plus four earlier single sides. Only one track, "Arigatō! Tomodachi", is exclusive to the EP.

Former band member Maiha Ishimura appears, but is not credited, on tracks 3 to 6.

== Release ==
The album debuted at number 45 in the Oricon Weekly Album chart, remaining in the list for 2 weeks.

The 9th single, "Gag 100-Kaibun Aishite Kudasai" (ギャグ100回分愛してください, Gyagu Hyakkaibun Aishite Kudasai; "Please Love Me as Much as 100 Jokes"), was released on 23 November 2005, by Up-Front Works' Piccolo Town label, as well as a version by Marvelous Entertainment, which featured a slightly different track listing. Abbreviated as "Gag100". It was later added on Special! Best Mini: 2.5 Maime no Kare. The song is used as the ending theme of Futari wa Pretty Cure Max Heart Movie 2: Friends of the Snow-Laden Sky. Due to Maiha Ishimura's graduation, this was the first Berryz Kobo single to feature only seven members.

The song charted at number 19 on the Oricon Singles Chart.

== Track listing ==
1. Gag 100kaibun Aishite Kudasai
2. Arigatō! Tomodachi (ありがとう！おともだち。; "Thank You! Friends.")
3. Special Generation (スッペシャル ジェネレ～ション)
4. 21ji made no Cinderella (21時までのシンデレラ; "Cinderella Until 9 PM")
5. Piriri to Yukō!
6. Anata Nashi de wa Ikite Yukenai

== Personnel ==
- Saki Shimizu - vocals and band leader
- Momoko Tsugunaga - vocals
- Chinami Tokunaga - vocals
- Miyabi Natsuyaki - vocals
- Maasa Sudo - vocals
- Yurina Kumai - vocals
- Risako Sugaya - vocals
- Maiha Ishimura - vocals (Tracks 3–6, uncredited)
- Yuichi Takahasi - keyboard and MIDI programming, guitar
- Kaoru Kubota - backing vocals
- Hideyuki "Daichi" Suzuki - keyboard and MIDI programming, guitar
- Hiroaki Takeuchi - chorus
- Koji Makaino - keyboard and MIDI programming
- Shinsuke Suzuki - guitar
- Hideyuki Komatsu - bass
- Horishi Iida - percussion
- Masato Yamao - organ
- Tsunku - backing vocals
- Amazons - backing vocals
- Takao Konishi - keyboard and MIDI programming
- Yasuo Asai - guitar
- Yasushi Sasamoto - bass
- Masanori Suzuki - trumpet
- Yoshinari Takegami - saxophone
- Satoshi Mizota - trombone
- Shoichiro Hirata - keyboard and MIDI programming
- Keiko "Chibi" Furuya - backing vocals
- Akira - guitar, bass, keyboards, MIDI programming, backing vocals
- Nobuyasu Umemoto - recording coordination
- Kazumi Matsui - recording engineer, mix engineer
- Ryo Wakizawa - recording engineer, mix engineer
- Shinnosuke Kobayashi - recording engineer
- Masakazu Kimura - mix engineer
- Naoki Yamada - mix engineer
- Yuji Yamashita - mix engineer
- Tsunku - mix engineer
- Yuichi Ohtsubo - 2nd engineer
- Hirofumi Hiraki - 2nd engineer
- Yōhei Horiuchi - 2nd engineer
- Mitsuko Koike - mastering engineer

== Charts ==
Chart (2005)	Peak position	Sales	
Chart (2005)	Peak position	First week	Total
Japan (Oricon Daily Albums Chart)	14		
Japan (Oricon Weekly Albums Chart)	45	6,071	7,072
