= Asian Celebration =

Single by Berryz Kobo

from the album Berryz Kobo Special Best Vol. 2
- Released: March 13, 2013 (Japan)
- Genre: J-pop; dance-pop; electropop
- Songwriter: Tsunku
- Producer: Tsunku

Berryz Kobo singles chronology
"Want!" (2012)	"Asian Celebration" (2013)	"Golden Chinatown / Sayonara Usotsuki no Watashi" (2013)

Music video
- "Asian Celebration" on YouTube

Professional ratings
Review scores
Source	Rating
Billboard Japan	Favorable

Asian Celebration (アジアンセレブレイション, Ajian Serebureishon) is Berryz Kobo's 31st single. It was released on March 13, 2013, in 5 editions: 1 regular and 4 limited editions. The titled track is the cheer song for a future Pretty Cure Allstars anime movie.

The single ranked #8 in the weekly Oricon charts, ran for 4 weeks with the estimate of 31,071 copies sold.

== Track listing ==
=== Regular Edition ===
1. Asian Celebration
2. Sekai de Ichiban Taisetsu na Hito (世界で一番大切な人; The Most Important Person in the World)
3. Asian Celebration (Instrumental)

=== Limited Edition A ===
CD

1. Asian Celebration
2. Sekai de Ichiban Taisetsu na Hito
3. Asian Celebration (Instrumental)

DVD

1. Asian Celebration (Music Video)
2. Asian Celebration (Dance Shot)

=== Limited Edition B ===
CD

1. Asian Celebration
2. I like a Picnic (Bird Thongchai cover)
3. Asian Celebration (Instrumental)

DVD

1. Asian Celebration (Music Video)
2. Asian Celebration (Dance Shot Ver.II)

=== Limited Edition C ===
CD

1. Asian Celebration
2. Sekai de Ichiban Taisetsu na Hito
3. Asian Celebration (Instrumental)

DVD

1. Asian Celebration (Music Video)
2. Making Of

=== Limited Edition D ===
1. Asian Celebration
2. I like a Picnic (Bird Thongchai cover)
3. Asian Celebration (Instrumental)

=== Event V ===
1. Asian Celebration (Shimizu Saki Solo Ver.)
2. Asian Celebration (Tsugunaga Momoko Solo Ver.)
3. Asian Celebration (Tokunaga Chinami Solo Ver.)
4. Asian Celebration (Sudo Maasa Solo Ver.)
5. Asian Celebration (Natsuyaki Miyabi Solo Ver.)
6. Asian Celebration (Kumai Yurina Solo Ver.)
7. Asian Celebration (Sugaya Risako Solo Ver.)

== Featured members ==
- Shimizu Saki
- Tsugunaga Momoko
- Tokunaga Chinami
- Sudo Maasa
- Natsuyaki Miyabi
- Kumai Yurina
- Sugaya Risako

== Concert performances ==
1. Asian Celebration
  - Hello! Project Tanjou 15 Shuunen Kinen Live 2013 Fuyu ~Viva!~
  - Hello! Project Tanjou 15 Shuunen Kinen Live 2013 Fuyu ~Bravo!~
  - Berryz Koubou Concert Tour 2013 Haru ~Berryz Mansion Nyuukyosha Boshuuchuu!~
  - Hello! Project Haru no Dai Kansha Hinamatsuri Festival 2013 ~Zen'yasai~
  - Hello! Project Haru no Dai Kansha Hinamatsuri Festival 2013 ~Berryz Koubou 10 Nenme Totsunyuu Special~
  - Hello! Project Haru no Dai Kansha Hinamatsuri Festival 2013 ~Thank You For Your Love!~
2. I like a picnic
  - Berryz Koubou Concert Tour 2013 Haru ~Berryz Mansion Nyuukyosha Boshuuchuu!~

== Song information ==
1. Asian Celebration
  - Lyrics and Composition: Tsunku
  - Arrangement: Hirata Shoichiro
  - Vocals:
    - Natsuyaki Miyabi (Main Vocal)
    - Tokunaga Chinami, Sudo Maasa, and Sugaya Risako (Center Vocals)
    - Shimizu Saki, Tsugunaga Momoko, and Kumai Yurina (Minor Vocals)
2. Sekai de Ichiban Taisetsu na Hito
  - Lyrics and Composition: Tsunku
  - Arrangement: Watanabe Yasushi
  - Vocals:
    - Tokunaga Chinami (Main Vocal)
    - Shimizu Saki, Tsugunaga Momoko, Sudo Maasa, Natsuyaki Miyabi, Kumai Yurina, Sugaya Risako (Minor Vocals)
3. I like a picnic
  - Lyrics: Aunnop Chansuta
  - Composition: Apisit Opasaimlikit
  - Japanese Lyrics: Tsunku
  - Arrangement: AKIRA
  - Vocals:
    - Natsuyaki Miyabi, Sugaya Risako (main vocals)
    - Tsugunaga Momoko, Kumai Yurina (minor vocals)

== Trivia ==
- "Asian Celebration" is a party tune.
- Some parts of "Asian Celebration" have monologues that are all done by Natsuyaki Miyabi.
- The single represented the 9th anniversary of Berryz Koubou and the start of their tenth year.
- The single was released a week after Tsugunaga Momoko's birthday.
- "I like a picnic" is a cover song, originally by Bird Thongchai. Berryz Koubou also covered Thongchai's songs in their 29th single, cha cha SING.
- This is the second Berryz Koubou single that has been used for a Pretty Cure movie.
- This is Berryz Koubou's third single in a row to have an English title.

== Oricon chart positions ==
Chart	Peak position
Oricon daily chart	5
Oricon weekly chart	8

Total reported sales: 31,071
