= 5 (Berryz Kobo album) =

5 (FIVE)

Studio album by Berryz Kobo
- Released: 10 September 2008
- Genre: Japanese pop
- Label: Piccolo Town
- Producer: Tsunku

Berryz Kobo chronology
4th Ai no Nanchara Shisū (2007)	5 (FIVE) (2008)	Berryz Kobo Special Best Vol. 1 (2009)

Singles from 5 (Five)
- 1. "Tsukiatteru no ni Kataomoi" Released: 28 November 2007; 2. "Dschinghis Khan" Released: 12 March 2008; 3. "Yuke Yuke Monkey Dance" Released: 9 July 2008

Music videos
- "Tsukiatteru no ni Kataomoi" on YouTube
- Dschinghis Khan" Video on YouTube
- Yuke Yuke Monkey Dance" Video on YouTube

5 (FIVE) is the fifth album by the Japanese girl group Berryz Kobo, released on 10 September 2008 in Japan and 17 September 2008 in South Korea. It was released both as a normal edition, with only the CD, and a limited edition, with a DVD included.

This album features three of their previous singles: "Tsukiatteru no ni Kataomoi" (15th), "Dschinghis Khan" (16th), and "Yuke Yuke Monkey Dance" (17th). It reached a peak of #11 on the Oricon weekly chart.

== Track listings ==
=== CD ===
1. HAPPY Stand Up!
2. Kono Yubi Tomare! (この指とまれ！, You're it!)
  - Performed by Momoko Tsugunaga, Chinami Tokunaga and Maasa Sudou
3. Baka ni Shinaide (バカにしないで, Don't Make Me a Fool)
  - Performed by Saki Shimizu, Miyabi Natsuyaki, Yurina Kumai and Risako Sugaya
4. Yuke Yuke Monkey Dance (行け 行け モンキーダンス, Go Go Monkey Dance)
5. Ah Merry-go-round
  - Performed by Shimizu Saki and Tsugunaga Momoko
6. CLAP!
  - Performed by Tokunaga Chinami, Natsuyaki Miyabi and Kumai Yurina
7. REAL LOVE
  - Performed by Risako Sugaya
8. Yume wo Hitotsubu ~Berryz Kamen Ending Theme~ (夢を一粒〜Berryz仮面 Ending テーマ〜, A Single Dream ~Berryz Kamen Ending Theme~)
9. Dschinghis Khan (ジンギスカン, Genghis Khan)
10. Tsukiatteru no ni Kataomoi (付き合ってるのに片思い, Even Though We're Dating, it's Unrequited Love)
11. BE
12. Special Generation (Eccentric Remix) (スッペシャル ジェネレ～ション (Eccentric Remix))

=== DVD ===
1. Event Part 1 (イベントPart1)
2. Maji Good Chance Summer (マジ グッドチャンス サマー, Really Good Chance Summer)
3. Event Part 2 (イベントPart2)
4. Yuke Yuke Monkey Dance (行け 行け モンキーダンス, Go Go Monkey Dance)
5. Ending (エンディング)
6. Akushukai (握手会, Handshake Meeting)

== Charts ==
Chart (2008)	Peak position	Weeks on chart	Sales	
Chart (2008)	Peak position	Weeks on chart	First week	Total
Japan (Oricon Daily Albums Chart)	4			
Japan (Oricon Weekly Albums Chart)	11	3	11,715	14,415
