= 3 Natsu Natsu Mini Berryz =

- Cover to the standard edition of the EP

EP by Berryz Koubou
- Released: 5 July 2006
- Recorded: March–June, 2006
- Genre: Japanese Pop
- Length: 24:27
- Label: Piccolo Town
- Producer: Tsunku

Berryz Koubou chronology
Special! Best Mini: 2.5 Maime no Kare (2005)	3 Natsu Natsu Mini Berryz (2006)	4th Ai no Nanchara Shisū (2007)

Singles from 3 Natsu Natsu Mini Berryz
- 1. "Jiriri Kiteru" Released: 28 March 2006

Music video
- Jiriri Kiteru on YouTube

Limited Edition Version
- Front cover of Limited Edition Version

"3 Natsu Natsu Mini Berryz" (③夏夏ミニベリーズ, San Natsu Natsu Mini Berīzu; 3: Summer, Summer, Mini Berryz) is the third studio album (a mini-album) by the Japanese girl group Berryz Kobo. It was released in Japan on 5 July 2006. It's the group's third studio album (although this is a mini album), fourth non-single release, and fifteenth audio release overall.

3 Natsu Natsu Mini Berryz is a concept album with a summer theme. It is also Berryz' second seasonal-themed release (Their previous EP, Special! Best Mini: 2.5 Maime no Kare, featured a winter theme in its artwork but no winter-related songs) and features their previous single "Jiriri Kiteru" along with five tracks exclusive to the EP.

The EP is equally notable to Berryz fans for featuring separate members, or clusters of members, covering summer-related Hello! Project songs by Aya Matsuura, Coconuts Musume, and 3nin Matsuri.

== Release ==
The album debuted at number 20 in the Oricon Weekly Single Chart, remaining in the list for 3 weeks.

"Jiriri Kiteru" (ジリリ キテル) is the first single taken to promote 3 Natsu Natsu Mini Berryz. It was released on 29 March 2006. The single ranked 6th in the Oricon Weekly Singles Chart, setting a new high for the group.

The single "Yeah! Meccha Holiday" (Yeah! めっちゃホリディ, Yeah! Meccha Horidei; Yeah! Super Holiday), previously released on 29 May 2002 by Aya Matsuura, who was a Hello! Project solo artist at the time. Tsunku composed and wrote the lyrics, and it was arranged by Yuichi Takahashi. The song appears in 2012 Japanese game Just Dance Wii 2. The title song was covered by AKB48's Rino Sashihara on her debut solo single "Soredemo Suki Da yo".

== Track listing ==
1. Jiriri Kiteru (ジリリ キテル)
2. Maji Natsu Sugiru (マジ夏すぎる) "It's so summer-like"
3. Natsu Remember you (夏 Remember you) "Summer Remembers You"
4. Yeah! Meccha Holiday (Yeah! めっちゃホリディ)
  - Vocals: Risako Sugaya. Cover version of a song originally recorded and released by Aya Matsuura.
5. Chu! Natsu Party (チュッ！夏パ～ティ) "Kiss! Summer Party"
  - Vocals by Yurina Kumai, Miyabi Natsuyaki and Chinami Tokunaga. Cover version of a song originally recorded and released by 3nin Matsuri (Ai Kago, Rika Ishikawa and Aya Matsuura)
6. Halation Summer (ハレーションサマー)
  - Vocals by Saki Shimizu, Maasa Sudo and Momoko Tsugunaga. Cover version of a song originally recorded and released by Coconuts Musume.

== Personnel ==
- Saki Shimizu – vocals and band captain
- Momoko Tsugunaga – vocals
- Chinami Tokunaga – vocals
- Miyabi Natsuyaki – vocals
- Maasa Sudou – vocals
- Yurina Kumai – vocals
- Risako Sugaya – vocals
- Koichi Yuasa – keyboard and MIDI programming, guitar
- Hiroshi Shibasaki – guitar
- Yukari Hashimoto – keyboard and MIDI programming
- Masato Ishinari – guitar
- Hiroshi Iida – percussion
- Hideyuki "Daichi" Suzuki – keyboard and MIDI programming, guitar
- Jun Yamazaki – keyboard and MIDI programming
- Shochiro Hirata – keyboard and MIDI programming
- Tsunku – backing vocals, songwriter
- Atsuko Inaba – backing vocals
- Hiroaki Takeuchi – backing vocals

=== Production ===
- Nobatsu Umemoto – recording coordination
- Asuka Ishikiri – production assistant
- Kazumi Matsui – recording and mix engineer
- Ryo Wakizaka – recording and mix engineer
- Takeshi Yanagisawa – mix engineer
- Shinnoskue Kobayashi – mix engineer
- Yuichi Ohtsubo – 2nd engineer
- Hirofumi Kiraki – 2nd engineer
- Youhei Koriuchi – 2nd engineer
- Mitsuo Koike – mastering engineer

== Charts ==
Chart (2006)	Peak position	Weeks on chart	Sales	
Chart (2006)	Peak position	Weeks on chart	First week	Total
Japan (Oricon Daily Albums Chart)	9			
Japan (Oricon Weekly Albums Chart)	20	3	8,925	10,988
