= Ōsama Game =

- Author: Nobuaki Kanazawa
- Original title: 王様ゲーム
- Translator: King's Game
- Language: Japanese
- Genre: Body horror, drama
- Publication date: 2009–2015
- Publication place: Japan
- Media type: Cellphone novel

Ōsama Game
- Directed by: Norio Tsuruta
- Starring: Airi Suzuki; Yurina Kumai; Dori Sakurada
- Production companies: BS-TBS; CBS
- Distributed by: MGM Home Entertainment (Current)
- Release date: December 17, 2011
- Country: Japan
- Language: Japanese

Ōsama Game (王様ゲーム, Ōsama Gemu; trans. "King Game") is a cell phone novel written by Nobuaki Kanazawa (pen name: Pakkuncho), consisting of five volumes. A film based on the novel was released in 2011 and directed by Norio Tsuruta. The theme song of the film is "Amazuppai Haru ni Sakura Saku" by Berryz Kobo and Cute. An anime based on the novel titled King's Game The Animation was also released in 2017 and directed by Noriyoshi Sasaki.

== Synopsis ==
Ōsama Game
On October 19, a class of 32 students receive a message from a mysterious sender called "King" at midnight, giving them a set of rules and an order.
Ōsama Game: Extreme
Being the only survivor of the Ōsama Game and having chosen to continue the game, Nobuaki transfers to a new school, thus starting the tragedy once more.
Ōsama Game: Spiral
Set before the events of Extreme, it is about Natsuko's Ōsama Game before she transferred.
Ōsama Game: Origin
Thirty years ago, it was a day like any other in Kazunari's small village when the notes outlining the "Ōsama Game" arrived. The villagers received orders, which became more gruesome by the day, and those who failed to comply died, like clockwork. Growing desperation raises suspicions among the villagers regarding the King's identity and police converge on the town as its body count continues to rise.
Ōsama Game: Annihilation
All high school students in Japan must participate in the game.
Ōsama Game: Abyss
32 students from Japan, Korea, and Taiwan are gathered in an island in Taiwan. Then, a new command from the King was given.
Ōsama Game: Purgatory

== Rules ==
1. All students in the class shall participate.
2. After receiving an order from the King, the order must be completed within 24 hours.
3. People who do not complete their order shall be punished.
4. Quitting in the middle of the game is not allowed.

== Orders ==
'Ōsama Game'
1st Order: Male student Seat No.4 Inoue Hirofumi, Female student Seat No.19 Nakao Minako. These two people must kiss. [Order Completed]
2nd Order: Male student Seat No.18 Toyoda Hideki, Female student Seat No.5 Imoto Yuuko. Toyoda Hideki must lick Imoto Yuuko's foot. [Order Completed]
3rd Order: Male student Seat No.18 Toyoda Hideki, Female student Seat No.3 Ishii Satomi. Toyoda Hideki must touch Ishii Satomi's breasts. [Order Not Completed: Toyoda Hideki and Ishii Satomi died by hanging.]
4th Order: Male student Seat No.17 Tasaki Daisuke, Female student Seat No.20 Nakajima Misaki. The two people must make love. [Order Completed]
5th Order: Male student Seat No.30 Yahiro Shouta. Yahiro Shouta must give an order in front of everybody. The person who receives the order, must follow it, as if it was an order from the King.
Shouta's Order: Male student Seat No.17 Tasaki Daisuke. Tasaki Daisuke must hang himself. [Order Not Completed: Tasaki Daisuke was hanged anyway.]
6th Order: Male student Seat No.21 Hashimoto Naoya, Female student Seat No.9 Ueda Kana. The entire class must hold a Friendship Vote for these two. The side who has the fewest votes shall be punished. If the Friendship Vote is not held, both sides will be punished. ※ Votes cannot be passed. [Order Completed: Hashimoto Naoya won. As punishment, Ueda Kana must confess to the one she loves. Unfortunately, she killed herself after Hashimoto Naoya's victory.]
Extra order: The King's order must be completed within 5 minutes. Ueda Kana did not complete her order, but she is no longer in this world, and therefore is unable to complete it. As a result, the person who was also involved in the order Hashimoto Naoya will be punished. Male student Seat No.21 Hashimoto Naoya must find someone to make love to. If this order is not executed, the punishment is spontaneous combustion. [Order Completed]
7th Order This game involves all male students. Prepare 100 pieces of paper, write 1–100 on them. Going by the seat numbers of the male students, starting from No.1, each person may choose to draw 1-3 cards, and thus continuing, the person who draws card no.100 will be punished. If the game is not conducted, all male students will be punished. Please enjoy the game. ※The punishment this time is a heart attack. [Order Completed: Akira Ôno drew card no.100 intentionally and died.]
8th Order Female student Seat No.22 Hirano Nami. Hirano Nami must give herself an order. Following the order, is equivalent to following the King's order.
Nami's Order: Female student Seat No.22 Hirano Nami. Hirano Nami must touch the King. [Order not Completed: Hirano Nami was sentenced to eternal darkness (blindness).]
9th Order Male student Seat No.12 Kanazawa Nobuaki. You must lose your most important possession. [Order Completed]
10th Order Male student Seat No.1 Adachi Shingo, Female student Seat No.15 Kinoshita Akemi. These two must each send two messages saying [Go die] to their classmates. The classmates who receive the message will die an accidental death. [Order Completed Seat No.15 Kinoshita Akemi]
11th Order All students in the class need to pay attention. People who do any unneeded action within the King's game will be punished. Also, Male student Seat No.28 Mizuuchi Yusuke, Heart attack. Male student Seat No.30 Yahiro Shouta, death by suffocation. Female student Seat No.15, drowned to death. These people have broken the rules of the game. (Unneeded action was: crying)
12th Order A student in the class must roll a dice. Depending on the number rolled, the person who rolled the dice must specify the same number of classmates. The person who rolled the dice, as well as the people specified, will all be punished.
※ If the dice isn't rolled, or nobody is specified, then everyone in the class shall be punished.
※ Within five minutes after rolling the dice, following the number rolled, specify the same number of classmates. The method to specify, is to have the person who rolled the dice send a message to the specified people. Sending a message to someone who is already dead is invalid. [Order completed: Hashimoto Naoya rolled the dice. Number rolled was 6.]
12th Order Amendment Within five minutes from now, following the number rolled, specify the same number of classmates. The method to specify, is to say their name. Specify immediately. [Order completed: Hashimoto Naoya named: Honda Chiemi (Novel only) Chia Kawano (Manga only), Keita Yamashita (was unwillingly named), Masami Matsumoto, (was unwillingly named in the novel; also named in the manga), Toshiyuki Abe, Toshiyuki Fujioka & Minako Nakao.]
13th Order (Novel only) Male student Seat No.12 Kanazawa Nobuaki must kill Honda Chiemi with his own hands. Also, the following participants will be punished. Female student Seat No.6 Iwamura Ria, punishment by decapitation. These people have broken the rules of the game. [Order completed]
13th Order (Manga only) Male student Seat No.12 Kanazawa Nobuaki and Female student Seat No.24 Honda Chiemi must kill the person they love the most. If the order is not completed, the 2 students will be decapitated. [Order not Completed: by sheer determination, both managed to survive, however Honda Chiemi bled to death due to a previous wound inflicted by Toshiyuki Abe]
14th Order (Novel only) Male student Seat No.12 Kanazawa Nobuaki must choose between being punished one last time or continue the game. [Order completed: Kanazawa Nobuaki continued the game]
'Ōsama Game Climax'

== Characters ==
Ōsama Game

- Seat No.1 Adachi Shingo [Killed by Ushijima Motoki, pushed down a staircase.]
- Seat No.2 Abe Toshiyuki [Punished due to Order 12, Punishment: Loss of blood.]
- Seat No.3 Ishii Satomi [Failed to complete Order 3, Punishment: Death by hanging.]
- Seat No.4 Inoue Hirofumi [Failed to complete Order 11, Punishment: Burned to death.]
- Seat No.5 Imoto Yuuko [Failed to complete Order 11, Punishment: Burned to death.]
- Seat No.6 Iwamura Ria [Novel: Broke the rules by blocking messages from the King, Punishment: Decapitation. Manga: Broke the rules by trying to destroy the King, Punishment: Burned to death.]
- Seat No.7 Iwamoto Maki [Accidental death due to Order 10, found dead in her bedroom.]
- Seat No.8 Ueda Yosuke [Failed to complete Order 11, Punishment: Quartering.]
- Seat No.9 Ueda Kana [Lost Friendship Vote at Order 6, Punishment: Must confess to the person she likes, regardless of the outcome.](Committed suicide by jumping out of a window before punishment was announced, was not punished as a result.)
- Seat No.10 Ushiji Motoki [Accidental death due to Order 10, killed whilst being transported to a police station.]
- Seat No.11 Ohno Akira [Drew the 100th card at Order 7, Punishment: Heart attack.]
- Seat No.12 Kanazawa Nobuaki [Novel: Failed to complete Order 11, Punishment: Temporary Memory loss (of Ōsama Game) (Regained his memory after killing Honda Chiemi). Was not punished in the manga.] (Only survivor: chose to continue the game, leading to the events of Ōsama Game: Climax]
- Seat No.13 Kawakami Yuusuke [Failed to complete Order 11, Punishment: Quartering.]
- Seat No.14 Kawano Chia [Broke the rules by blocking messages from the King, Punishment: Suffocation.]
- Seat No.15 Kinoshita Akemi [Broke the rules by blocking messages from the King, Punishment: Drowned to death.]
- Seat No.16 Shirokawa Mami [Failed to complete Order 11, Punishment: Decapitation.]
- Seat No.17 Tasaki Daisuke [Failed to complete Order 5 (Shouta's Order), Punishment: Death by hanging.]
- Seat No.18 Toyoda Hideki [Failed to complete Order 3, Punishment: Death by hanging]
- Seat No.19 Nakao Minako [Punished due to Order 12, Punishment: Suffocation.]
- Seat No.20 Nakajima Misaki [Failed to complete Order 11, Punishment: Decapitation.]
- Seat No.21 Hashimoto Naoya [Rolled the dice at Order 12, Punishment: Separated by six cuts.]
- Seat No.22 Hirano Nami [Failed to complete Order 8, Punishment: Remain in eternal darkness (Blindness).](Committed suicide by drowning.)
- Seat No.23 Fujioka Toshiyuki [Punished due to Order 12, Punishment: Loss of blood.]
- Seat No.24 Honda Chiemi [Novel: Punished due to Order 12, Punishment: Senescence. Was not punished in the manga.]
- Seat No.25 Matsushima Yoshifumi
- Seat No.26 Matsumoto Masami [Punished due to Order 12, Punishment: Heart attack.]
- Seat No.27 Maruoka Kaori [Failed to complete Order 11, Punishment: Unspecified death.]
- Seat No.28 Mizuuchi Yusuke [Broke the rules by blocking messages from the King, Punishment: Heart attack]
- Seat No.29 Miyazaki Emi [Failed to complete Order 11, Punishment: Quartering.]
- Seat No.30 Yahiro Shouta [Broke the rules by blocking messages from the King, Punishment: Suffocation]
- Seat No.31 Yamaguchi Hiroko [Failed to complete Order 11, Punishment: Heart attack.]
- Seat No.32 Yamashita Keita [Punished due to Order 12, Punishment: Decapitation.]

== Cast ==
- Airi Suzuki as Ria Iwamura
- Yurina Kumai as Chiemi Honda
- Dori Sakurada as Nobuaki Kanazawa
- Hisanori Satō as Naoya Hashimoto
- Risako Sugaya as Nami Shirokawa
- Chisato Okai as Kaori Maruoka
- Maasa Sudo as Tomoko Shimizu
- Chinami Tokunaga as Akemi Kinoshita
- Momoko Tsugunaga as Yuko Imoto
- Saki Nakajima as Kana Ueda
- Afeefa Hannan (student) as the Leader/King
- Miyabi Natsuyaki as Emi MiyaZaki
- Saki Shimizu as Masami Matsumoto
- Saki Mori as Satomi Ishii
- Miharu Tanaka as Minako Nakao
- Yoshihiko Hosoda as Yosuke Nogami
- Satoshi Tomiura as Shota Yahiro
- Ayumu Satō
- Kensuke Ōwada
- Maimi Yajima
- Mai Hagiwara
- Hitomi Yoshizawa

== See also ==
- King's Game The Animation
