= Yuke Yuke Monkey Dance =

"Yuke Yuke Monkey Dance Go Go Monkey Dance"

Single by Berryz Kobo

from the album 5 (Five)
- B-side: "Maji Good Chance Summer"
- Released: July 9, 2008
- Recorded: 2008
- Genre: J-pop
- Label: Piccolo Town
- Songwriter: Tsunku
- Producer: Tsunku

Berryz Kobo singles chronology
"Dschinghis Khan" (2008)	"Yuke Yuke Monkey Dance; Go Go Monkey Dance" (2008)	"Madayade" (2008)

Music video
- "Yuke Yuke Monkey Dance" on YouTube

Yuke Yuke Monkey Dance (行け 行け モンキーダンス, Yuke Yuke Monkī Dansu; Go Go Monkey Dance) is the 17th single by Berryz Kobo. The single was released on July 9, 2008.

== Details ==
- Main vocalist: Risako Sugaya
- Minor vocalists: Miyabi Natsuyaki, Momoko Tsugunaga, Chinami Tokunaga, Maasa Sudou
- Center: Risako Sugaya

The order of members who had the most solo parts in the song to the least:
Risako Sugaya > Miyabi Natsuyaki > Momoko Tsugunaga = Chinami Tokunaga > Maasa Sudo > Saki Shimizu = Yurina Kumai

== Track listing ==
1. "Yuke Yuke Monkey Dance" (行け 行け モンキーダンス, Go Go Monkey Dance)
  (Composition and Lyrics: Tsunku, Arrangement: Shoichiro Hirata)
2. "Maji Good Chance Summer" (マジ グッドチャンス サマー, Maji guddo chansu samaa; "Really Good Chance Summer")
  (Composition and Lyrics: Tsunku, Arrangement: Shoichiro Hirata)
3. "Yuke Yuke Monkey Dance" (Instrumental)

== PV versions ==
- Normal version
- Dance-shot version
- Monkey version
- Close-up version (group)
- Close-up version (one for each individual member)
