= Kokuhaku no Funsui Hiroba =

- Regular edition cover

Single by Berryz Kobo

from the album 4th Ai no Nanchara Shisū
- B-side: "Seishun Ōdori"
- Released: June 27, 2007 (CD); 11 July, 2007 (Single V)
- Recorded: 2007
- Genre: J-pop
- Length: 13:30
- Label: Piccolo Town
- Songwriter(s): Tsunku
- Producer(s): Tsunku

Berryz Kobo singles chronology
"Very Beauty" (2007)	"Kokuhaku no Funsui Hiroba" (2007)	"Tsukiatteru no ni Kataomoi" (2007)

Music videos
- Kokuhaku no Funsui Hiroba on YouTube
- Kokuhaku no Funsui Hiroba(Dance Shot Ver.) on YouTube

Kokuhaku no Funsui Hiroba (告白の噴水広場, "Fountain Plaza of My Confession") is the 14th single by all-girl J-pop group Berryz Kobo, released on June 27, 2007 on the Piccolo Town label (distributed by King Records). The single was released both as a normal, CD-only edition and a limited edition with a bonus DVD. The limited edition also contained a Berryz Kobo photo-card. An entry ticket to the launch event on July 1 was included with the first copies of the limited edition. Later, a "B" limited edition was released, including a bonus photobook. The Single V was released on July 11, 2007. The single peaked at #4 on the weekly Oricon charts, the group's new personal high, charting for three weeks; the Single V peaked at #17 and charted for two weeks.

The PV for the single was shot entirely on location in Tokyo, in a park near Yotsuya.

== Details ==
- Main vocals: Miyabi Natsuyaki, Risako Sugaya
- Minor vocals: Momoko Tsugunaga, Yurina Kumai
- Center: Risako Sugaya

== Track listings ==
=== CD ===
1. "Kokuhaku no Funsui Hiroba" (告白の噴水広場,, Fountain Plaza of my Confession)
  - Composition and Lyrics: Tsunku, arrangement: Shōichirō Hirata)
2. "Seishun Ōdori" (青春大通り, Youth Boulevard)
  - Composition and Lyrics: Tsunku, arrangement: Takao Konishi)
3. "Kokuhaku no Funsui Hiroba (Instrumental)" (告白の噴水広場 (Instrumental))

=== Limited edition DVD ===
1. "Kokuhaku no Funsui Hiroba (Dance Shot Ver.)" (告白の噴水広場 (Dance Shot Ver.))

=== Single V ===
1. "Kokuhaku no Funsui Hiroba" (告白の噴水広場)
2. "Kokuhaku no Funsui Hiroba (Close-Up Ver.)" (青春大通り (Close-Up Ver.))
3. "Making of" (メイキング映像, Making Eizō)
