= Dai 2 Seichōki =

Studio album by Berryz Kobo
- Released: 16 November 2005
- Recorded: June 2004–September 2005
- Genre: J-pop
- Length: 43:12
- Label: Piccolo Town
- Producer: Tsunku

Berryz Kobo chronology
1st Chō Berryz (2004)	Dai 2 Seichōki (2005)	Special! Best Mini: 2.5 Maime no Kare (2005)

Singles from Dai 2 Seichōki
- 1. "Happiness (Kōfuku Kangei!)" Released: 25 August 2004; 2. "Koi no Jubaku" Released: 10 November 2004; 3. "Special Generation" Released: 3 March 2005; 4. "Nanchū Koi o Yatterū You Know?" Released: 8 June 2005; 5. "21ji made no Cinderella" Released: 3 August 2005

Music videos
- Happiness (Kōfuku Kangei!) on YouTube
- Koi no Jubaku on YouTube
- Special Generation on YouTube
- Nanchū Koi o Yatterū You Know? on YouTube
- 21ji made no Cinderella on YouTube

Dai 2 Seichōki (第②成長記, Daini Seichōki; "Record of the Second Growing Season") is the second full-length album by J-pop group Berryz Kobo, released on 16 November 2005. "Dai 2" (the second) is pronounced Dai ni. The first pressing of the album was enclosed in a cardboard slipcase and included four double-sided photocards of the band. The album peaked at #19 on the Oricon weekly charts, charting for 3 weeks.

This album was the last Berryz Kobo release to feature Maiha Ishimura, who graduated from Hello! Project in 2005 in order to focus on her education. Ishimura's vocals are featured on the singles within the album; she is, however, not credited anywhere and does not feature on the cover. The seven remaining members of the band are depicted in school uniforms and carrying bookbags.

Dai 2 Seichōki would be the first of an informal trilogy of three Berryz releases, each issued within one or two weeks of each other, to close out the group's second year of existence.

== Release ==
"Happiness (Kōfuku Kangei!)" (ハピネス～幸福歓迎！～, Hapinesu ~Kōfuku Kangei!~; Happiness ~Welcome Happiness!~) is the first single taken to promote Dai 2 Seichōki. It entered the Oricon Weekly Singles Chart at number 20, with 11,000 copies setting a record for Berryz Kobo's first week sales.

The second single, "Koi no Jubaku" (恋の呪縛) (Love's Spell), was released on 10 November 2004. The single entered the Oricon Daily Singles Chart at number 6.

The third single, "Special Generation" (スッペシャル ジェネレ～ション, Supesharu Generēshon), was released on 30 March 2005. The single placed 7th in the Oricon Weekly Singles Chart, It became the group's first single (or album) to rank in the Top 10 and also its first to sell over 20,000 copies. At that time, the group's average age was below 12 years.

== Track listing ==
1. "Special Opening" (スッペシャルOP)
2. "Special Generation" (スッペシャルジェネレーション)
3. "Nanchū Koi o Yatterū You Know?" (なんちゅう恋をやってる YOU KNOW？; "It's How Love Is, You Know?")
4. "Joshi Basket-Bu (Asaren Atta Hi no Kamigata)" (女子バスケット部～朝練あった日の髪型～; "Girls' Basketball (Hairdo for Morning Practice)")
5. Koi no Jubaku (恋の呪縛 Love's Curse)
6. "Ohiru no Kyūkeijikan." (お昼の休憩時間。; "Lunch Break.")
7. "Happiness (Kōfuku Kangei!)"
8. "Sabori" (さぼり)
9. "21ji made no Cinderella" (21時までのシンデレラ; "Cinderella Until 9 PM")
10. "Aisuru Hito no Namae wo Nikki ni" (愛する人の名前を日記に; "Name of the One I Love Inside My Diary")
11. "Berryz Kobo Kōshinkyoku" (Berryz工房行進曲; "Berryz Kobo's March")
12. "Special Ending" (スッペシャルED)

== Personnel ==
- Saki Shimizu - vocals
- Momoko Tsugunaga - vocals
- Chinami Tokunaga - vocals
- Miyabi Natsuyaki - vocals
- Maasa Sudou - vocals
- Yurina Kumai - vocals
- Risako Sugaya - vocals
- Maiha Ishimura - vocals (uncredited)
- Koichi Yuasa - keyboard, drum and MIDI programming
- Koji Makaino - keyboards, drum and MIDI programming
- Shunsuke Suzuki - guitar, keyboards, drum and MIDI programming
- Hideyuki Komatsu - bass
- Horishi Iida - percussion
- Masato Yamao - organ
- Shoichiro Hirata - keyboards, drum and MIDI programming
- Nao Tanaka - keyboards, drum and MIDI programming, guitar
- Manao Doi - guitar
- Shunji Takenaka - guitar
- Takashi Morio - keyboards, drum and MIDI programming
- Eiji Kawai - guitar
- Koji - guitar
- Takao Konishi - keyboards, drum and MIDI programming
- Yasuo Asai - guitar
- Yasushi Sasamoto - bass
- Masanori Suzuki - trumpet
- Yoshinari Takegami - saxophone
- Satoshi Mizota - trombone
- Noriyoshi Matsushita - keyboards, drum and MIDI programming
- Tsunku - backing vocals, composer
- Atsuko Inaba - backing vocals
- Hiroaki Takeuchi - backing vocals
- Amazons (Yuko Otaki, Kumi Saito, Tomoko Hada) - backing vocals

=== Production ===
- Nobuyasu Umemoto - recording coordination
- Kazumi Matsui - recording engineer, mix engineer
- Ryo Wakizawa - recording engineer, mix engineer
- Shinnosuke Kobayashi - recording engineer
- Takeshi Yanagisawa - mix engineer
- Yuji Yamashita - mix engineer
- Tsunku - mix engineer
- Yuichi Ohtsubo - 2nd engineer
- Hirofumi Hiraki - 2nd engineer
- Yōhei Horiuchi - 2nd engineer
- Mitsuko Koike - mastering engineer

== Charts ==
Chart (2005)	Peak position	Weeks on chart	Sales	
Chart (2005)	Peak position	Weeks on chart	First week	Total
Japan (Oricon Daily Albums Chart)	8			
Japan (Oricon Weekly Albums Chart)	19	3	11,843	14,631
