= Munasawagi Scarlet =

- CD cover

Single by Berryz Kobo

from the album 4th Ai no Nanchara Shisū
- A-side: "Munasawagi Scarlet"
- B-side: "Aitai Kedo..."
- Released: December 6, 2006
- Recorded: 2006
- Genre: J-pop
- Label: Piccolo Town
- Songwriter(s): Tsunku
- Producer(s): Tsunku

Berryz Kobo singles chronology
"Waratchaō yo Boyfriend" (2006)	"Munasawagi Scarlet" (2006)	"Very Beauty" (2007)

Music videos
- Munasawagi Scarlet on YouTube
- Munasawagi Scarlet (Dance Shot Ver.) on YouTube

"Munasawagi Scarlet" (胸さわぎスカーレット, Munasawagi Sukāretto, Scarlet Premonition) is the 12th single of the all-girl J-pop group Berryz Kobo, released on December 6, 2006.

The single ranked 12th in the Oricon Weekly Singles Chart.

== Details ==
- Main vocalist: Momoko Tsugunaga, Miyabi Natsuyaki
- Minor Vocalist: Risako Sugaya
- Center: Risako Sugaya, Yurina Kumai and Chinami Tokunaga

== Track listing ==
=== CD track list ===
1. "Munasawagi Scarlet" (胸さわぎスカーレット, Scarlet Premonition)
  (Composition and Lyrics: Tsunku, Arrangement: Yuasa Kouichi)
2. "Aitai Kedo... (会いたいけど..., I Want to Meet You, but...)
  (Composition and Lyrics: Tsunku, Arrangement: Takahashi Yuichi)
3. "Munasawagi Scarlet (Instrumental)" (胸さわぎスカーレット (Instrumental))

=== Single V ===
1. "Munasawagi Scarlet" (胸さわぎスカーレット)
2. "Munasawagi Scarlet (Dance Shot Ver.)" (胸さわぎスカーレット (Dance Shot version))
3. "Making of" (メイキング映像)
