= Special Generation =

Special Generation may refer to:

- Special Generation (band), an American vocal quintet
- "Special Generation" (song), by the Japanese girl idol group Berryz Kobo
