= Very Beauty =

Single by Berryz Kobo

from the album 4th Ai no Nanchara Shisū
- Released: March 7, 2007 (Japan)
- Genre: J-pop; dance-pop; electropop
- Label: Piccolo Town
- Songwriter: Tsunku
- Producer: Tsunku

Berryz Kobo singles chronology
"Munasawagi Scarlet" (2006)	"Very Beauty" (2007)	"Kokuhaku no Funsui Hiroba" (2007)

Music video
- "Very Beauty" - YouTube

"Very Beauty" (VERY BEAUTY) is the 13th single by the Japanese girl idol group Berryz Kobo. It was released in Japan on March 7, 2007, and debuted at number 11 in the weekly Oricon singles chart.

== Track listings ==
=== CD single ===
1. "Very Beauty" (VERY BEAUTY)
2. "Gaki Taishō" (ガキ大将)
3. "Very Beauty" (Instrumental)

Limited Edition A DVD
Excerpts from the concert "Hello! Project 2007 Winter ~Wonderful Hearts Otome Gocoro~"

1. "Munasawagi Scarlet" (胸騒ぎスカーレット)
2. "Fighting Pose wa Date ja Nai!" (ファイティングポーズはダテじゃない!)

=== DVD single Very Beauty Single V ===
1. "Very Beauty"
2. "Very Beauty" (Dance Shot Ver.)
3. Making-of (メイキング映像, Making Eizô)

== Charts ==
Chart (2007)	Peak position
Japan (Oricon Weekly Singles Chart)	11
