= 21ji made no Cinderella =

Single by Berryz Kobo

from the album Dai 2 Seichōki
- B-side: "Himitsu no U.ta.hi.me"
- Released: August 3, 2005 (Japan)
- Genre: J-pop
- Label: Piccolo Town
- Songwriter: Tsunku
- Producer: Tsunku

Berryz Kobo singles chronology
"Nanchū Koi o Yatterū You Know?" (2005)	"21ji made no Cinderella" (2005)	"Gag 100kaibun Aishite Kudasai" (2005)

Music video
- "21ji made no Cinderella" - YouTube

"21ji made no Cinderella" (21時までのシンデレラ; "Cinderella until 21 o'clock") is the 8th single by the Japanese girl idol group Berryz Kobo. It was released in Japan on August 3, 2005, and debuted at number 5 in the daily Oricon singles chart and at number 13 in the weekly Oricon singles chart.

It was the last single that featured Berryz Kobo member Maiha Ishimura.

== Track listings ==
=== CD single ===
1. "21ji Made no Cinderella" (２１時までのシンデレラ)
2. "Himitsu no U.ta.hi.me" (秘密のウ･タ･ヒ･メ)
3. "21ji made no Cinderella" (Instrumental)

=== DVD single "21ji made no Cinderella" Single V ===
1. "21ji made no Cinderella"
2. "21ji made no Cinderella" (Dance Shot Ver.)
3. Making-of (メイキング映像, Making Eizô)

== Charts ==
Charts (2005)	Peak position
Japan (Oricon Weekly Singles Chart)	13
