= Light Novel no Tanoshii Kakikata =

Japanese light novel

- Cover of the first light novel

ライトノベルの楽しい書き方
- Light novel
- Written by: Tōru Honda
- Illustrated by: Kasumu Kirino
- Published by: SB Creative
- Original run: February 15, 2008 – present
- Volumes: 9
- Live-action film
- Directed by: Kenichi Ōmori
- Released: December 4, 2010
- Runtime: 80 minutes

Light Novel no Tanoshii Kakikata (ライトノベルの楽しい書き方) is a Japanese light novel written by Tōru Honda and illustrated by Kasumu Kirino. It was adapted into a live action film in 2010.

== Cast ==
- Maasa Sudo as Tsurugi Yabusame
- Hisanori Satō as Yakumo Atae
- Ayana Taketatsu as Yūna Ichigo
- Arisa Noto as Kokona Atae
- Mariko Kouda as Marumi Atae
- Hiroki Suzuki as Kiyomaro Ishikiri

== See also ==
Travellers and Magicians
