= Frederik (singer) =

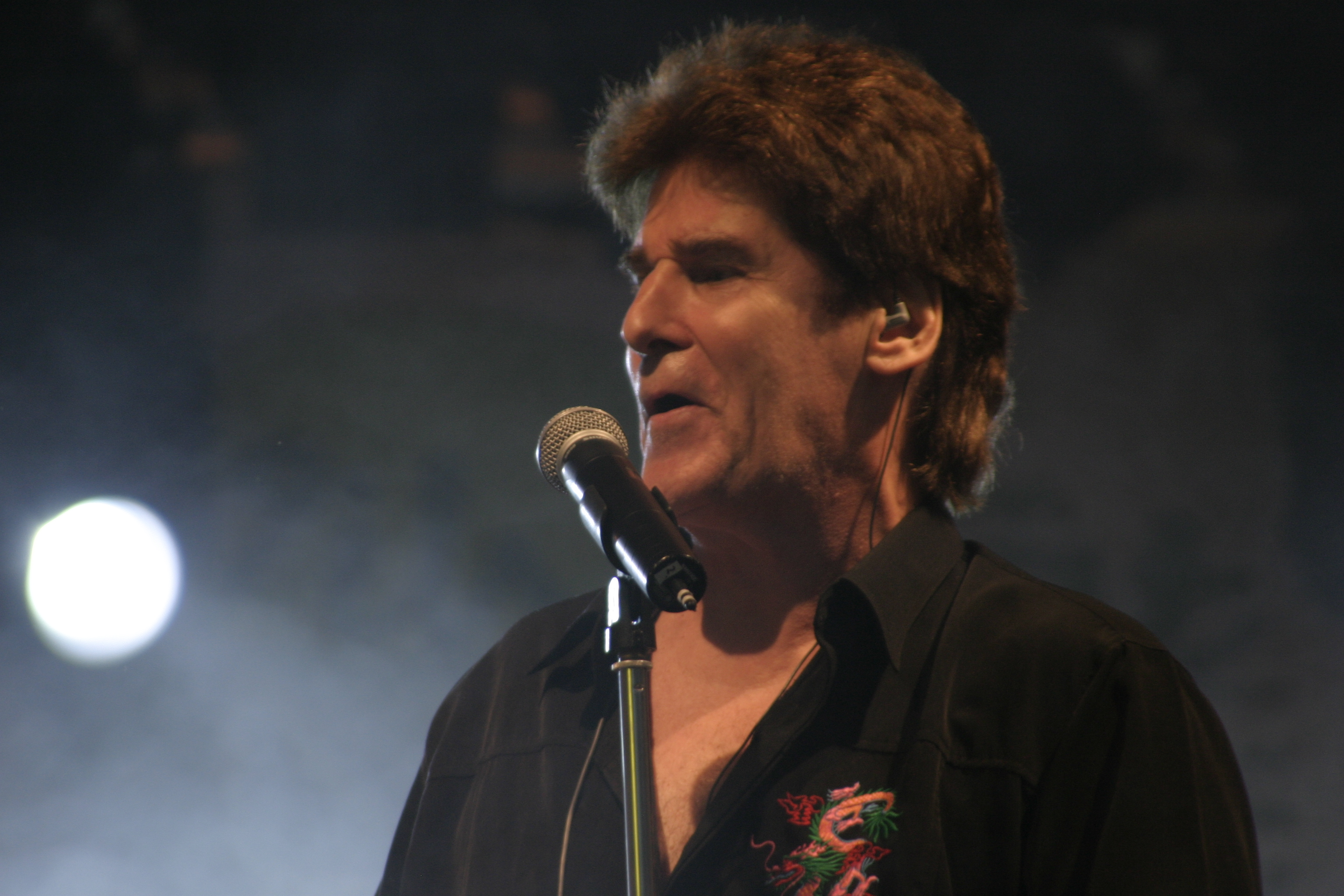
- Frederik performing in Kiuruvesi, 2008

Background information
- Also known as: Frederik; Anssi Savioja
- Born: Ilkka Juhani Sysimetsä; 2 February 1945 (age 81); Helsinki, Finland
- Genres: Schlager; Pop; Disco
- Occupations: Singer; songwriter
- Years active: 1966–present
- Website: frederik.fi

Ilkka Juhani Sysimetsä (born 2 February 1945), known professionally as Frederik. is a Finnish singer. He is also known by his nickname Reetu. During his lengthy career of machostyle disco and pop music, he has been awarded with five gold and three diamond records. One of his contemporary nicknames is "Junttidiscon kuningas" ("King of redneck disco"). Frederik started his musical career as an electric organist in a pop group named Jim & The Beatmakers. He played later in a beat pop group named The Roosters in the mid-1960s.

Some of his best-known songs are "Jos jotain yrittää (Harva meistä on rautaa)", "Linda Linda", "Tsingis Khan", "Sheikki Ali Hassan", "Titanic", "Stenka Rasin", "Kasakkapartio", "Volga", "Kung-Fu taistelee" and many more.

He quit drinking alcohol in 2012 and has become a political candidate for the populist Change 2011 party in the parliamentary elections of 2015.
