= Dschinghis Khan (song) =

1979 song by Dschinghis Khan

- Standard artwork (Jupiter release pictured)

Single by Dschinghis Khan

from the album Dschinghis Khan
- Language: German
- B-side: "Sahara"; "Desert Land" (international)
- Released: 1979
- Recorded: 1979
- Studio: Olympia Studios Munich
- Genre: Disco
- Length: 2:59
- Label: Jupiter Records
- Composer: Ralph Siegel
- Lyricist: Bernd Meinunger
- Producer: Ralph Siegel

Dschinghis Khan singles chronology
"Dschinghis Khan" (1979)	"Moskau" (1979)

Eurovision Song Contest 1979 entry
- Country: West Germany
- Artists: Louis Hendrik Potgieter; Wolfgang Heichel; Henriette Heichel-Strobel; Edina Pop; Steve Bender; Leslie Mándoki
- As: Dschinghis Khan
- Language: German
- Composer: Ralph Siegel
- Lyricist: Bernd Meinunger
- Conductor: Norbert Daum

Finals performance
- Final result: 4th
- Final points: 86

Entry chronology
- ◄ "Feuer" (1978)
- "Theater" (1980) ►

Official performance video
- "Dschinghis Khan" on YouTube

"Dschinghis Khan" (German pronunciation: [ˌdʒɪŋɡɪs ˈkaːn]; "Genghis Khan") is a song recorded by German disco group Dschinghis Khan, with music composed by Ralph Siegel and lyrics by Bernd Meinunger. It represented West Germany in the Eurovision Song Contest 1979, held in Jerusalem, and was released as the first single from the group's debut album, Dschinghis Khan.

It was a number one hit in West Germany, and a top 10 hit also in Austria, Finland, Norway, and Switzerland. In addition to the German original version, the group also released the song in English. Cover versions by a number of other artists were subsequently released as singles and album tracks.

== Background ==
=== Conception ===
The song was written by the composer Ralph Siegel and the lyricist Bernd Meinunger, and is inspired by Boney M. and other disco acts. The lyrics are about Genghis Khan's military ("and about his enemies he only laughed / because nobody could resist his strength") and sexual ("he fathered seven children in one night") feats.

=== Eurovision ===
On 17 March 1979, "Dschinghis Khan" competed in Vorentscheid 1979, the national final organized by Bayerischer Rundfunk (BR) for ARD to select their song and performer for the 24th edition of the Eurovision Song Contest. The song won the competition so it became the West German entry for the contest. In addition to the German original version, the group also released the song in English.

On 31 March 1979, the Eurovision Song Contest was held at the International Convention Center in Jerusalem hosted by the Israeli Broadcasting Authority (IBA), and broadcast live throughout the continent. Dschinghis Khan performed their song ninth on the night, following Switzerland's "Trödler und Co" by Peter, Sue & Marc and Pfuri, Gorps & Kniri and preceding Israel's "Hallelujah" by Milk and Honey. Norbert Daum conducted the event's live orchestra in the performance of the German entry. At the close of voting "Dschinghis Khan" had received 86 points, placing fourth in a field of nineteen.

=== Aftermath ===
The song had a lasting success in Japan. In 2014 it was certified gold for 100,000 digital downloads, after first being released digitally in 2006.

In 2020, the Dschinghis Khan lineup led by Wolfgang Heichel and Stefan Track re-recorded the song and filmed its music video in Mongolia, featuring Heichel interacting with a Mongolian tribe.

== Track listings ==
Original German single
No.	Title	Writer(s)	Length
1.	"Dschinghis Khan"	Siegel; Meinunger	2:59
2.	"Sahara"	Siegel; Meinunger	3:00
Total length:			5:59

International single
No.	Title	Writer(s)	Length
1.	"Genghis Khan"	Siegel; Meinunger	3:06
2.	"Desert Land"	Dornaus; Meinunger; Hertha; Siegel	3:00
Total length:			6:06

== Charts ==
=== Weekly charts ===
Chart (1979)	Peak position
Austria (Ö3 Austria Top 40)	8
Belgium (Ultratop 50 Flanders)	20
Finland (Suomen virallinen lista)	5
Norway (VG-lista)	3
Switzerland (Schweizer Hitparade)	3
West Germany (GfK)	1

=== Year-end charts ===
Chart (1979)	Position
West Germany (Official German Charts)	6

== Legacy ==
=== Frederik version ===
"Tsingis Khan"

Single by Frederik

from the album Tsingis Khan
- Language: Finnish
- B-side: "Linda, Linda"
- Released: 1979
- Recorded: 1979
- Genre: Disco
- Length: 3:00
- Label: Finnlevy
- Songwriters: Juha Vainio; Ralph Siegel; Bernd Meinunger

Frederik singles chronology
"Sano että pidät musta" (1978)	"Tsingis Khan" (1979)	""Ii (Siellä on se joki)"" (1979)

Music videos
- "Tsingis Khan" on YouTube

Finnish singer Frederik covered the song as "Tsingis Khan" in his 1979 album Tsingis Khan, with Finnish lyrics by Juha Vainio. According to the website of Frederik, the composer of the original song, Ralph Siegel, considered the Frederik version to be even better than the original. Siegel offered Frederik to also cover the song "Hadschi Halef Omar", which he did as "Sheikki Ali Hassan" in a 1980 single. "Tsingis Khan" peaked at No. 14 on the Finnish Singles Chart and was certified Gold.

Frederik's version of the song is also used as ring entry theme by Russian boxer Denis "Tsingis Khan" Shafikov.

==== Track listing ====
7" single
No.	Title	Writer(s)	Arrangement	Length
1.	"Tsingis Khan"	Juha Vainio; Ralph Siegel; Bernd Meinunger	Esa Nieminen	3:00
2.	"Linda, Linda"	Chrisse Johansson; Hans von Eijck; Michel Boesveld; Peter Tetterooo	Kalervo Halonen	3:27
Total length:				6:27

==== Chart history ====
Chart (1979)	Position
Finland (The Official Finnish Charts)	14

=== Berryz Kobo version ===
"Dschinghis Khan"
- Regular Edition cover

Single by Berryz Kobo

from the album 5 (Five)
- Language: Japanese
- B-side: "Darling I Love You" (Berryz Kobo ver.)
- Released: March 12, 2008
- Recorded: 2008
- Genre: J-pop; dance-pop
- Length: 3:11
- Label: Piccolo Town
- Composer: Ralph Siegel
- Lyricists: Bernd Meinunger; Iori Yamamoto
- Producer: Tsunku

Berryz Kobo singles chronology
"Tsukiatteru no ni Kataomoi" (2007)	"Dschinghis Khan" (2008)	"Yuke Yuke Monkey Dance" (2008)

Music videos
- "Dschinghis Khan" on YouTube

The Japanese girl idol group Berryz Kobo also released a cover of the song, albeit with toned-down lyrics, which do not make mention to the more explicit details pertaining to war, rape or the consumption of alcoholic beverages found in the 1979 original.

This single release marks the group's first cover song to be slotted as an a-side in a single. There are two versions to this single, a limited edition with a DVD (PKCP-5112~3) and a regular edition (PKCP-5114 – first pressing containing a photo card and a ticket for a raffle to attend an event promoting the single).

The song was used as the main song to the group's musical, Dschinghis Khan ~Wa ga Tsurugi, Nessa wo Some yo~ (ジンギスカン～わが剣、熱砂を染めよ～), running through January 2008.

The single debuted at number 4 in the Oricon Daily Singles Chart and ranked 5th for the week. It was Berryz Kobo's highest selling single until the release of "Motto Zutto Issho ni Itakatta / ROCK Erotic" in 2013.

In 2009, the single was released in Thailand. It became one of the top songs of the year, ranking 26th in the Channel V Thailand's Asian Top 50 Year-End Chart of 2009.

==== Track listings ====
CD single
No.	Title	Lyrics	Music	Arrangement	Length
1.	"Dschinghis Khan" (Jingisu Kan (ジンギスカン))	Bernd Meinunger; Iori Yamamoto	Ralph Siegel	Dance Man	3:11
2.	"Darling I Love You" ((ダーリン I LOVE YOU))	Tsunku	Tsunku	Dance Man	4:22
3.	"Dschinghis Khan" (Instrumental)				3:09
Total length:					10:42

Limited Edition DVD
No.	Title	Length
1.	"Dschinghis Khan" (Dance Shot Ver.)

Single V
No.	Title	Length
1.	"Dschinghis Khan" (Video Clip)
2.	"Dschinghis Khan" (Close-up Ver.)
3.	"Making Eizō" ((メイキング映像; "Making-of"))

==== Chart history ====
Chart (2008)	Peak position	Weeks on chart	Sales	
Chart (2008)	Peak position	Weeks on chart	First week	Total
Japan (Oricon Daily Singles Chart)	4			
Japan (Oricon Weekly Singles Chart)	5	8	30,667	37,096

==== Awards ====
The Japan Cable Awards are sponsored by the National Cable Music Broadcasters Association (全国有線音楽放送協会, Zenkoku Yūsen Ongaku Hōsō Kyōkai).

Year	Nominee / work	Award	Result
2008	"Dschinghis Khan" by Berryz Kobo	Cable Music Award	Won
2008	"Dschinghis Khan" by Berryz Kobo	Grand Prix*	Nominated

* awarded to the most requested song of the year on the cable radio

=== Dschinghis Khan × Berryz Kobo single ===
"Dschinghis Khan Tartar Mix"
- CD single cover

Single by Dschinghis Khan×Berryz Kobo
- Language: Japanese; German
- Released: September 17, 2008 (CD single); November 25, 2008 (Single V)
- Recorded: 2008
- Genre: J-pop; Eurobeat
- Label: Piccolo Town
- Composer: Ralph Siegel
- Lyricists: Bernd Meinunger; Iori Yamamoto
- Producer: Tsunku

"Dschinghis Khan Tartar Mix" (ジンギスカン タルタルミックス, Jingisu Kan Tarutaru Mikkusu) is a single by the collaboration unit Dschinghis Khan×Berryz Kobo (ジンギスカン×Berryz工房). It was released on September 17, 2008, following the success of Berryz Kobo's version. The title track "Dschinghis Khan Tartar Mix" features a mix of both groups' vocal tracks. The single also includes both Berryz Kobo and Dschinghis Khan's versions. The music video for the new song had Berryz Kobo digitally placed into a video of an old Dschinghis Khan performance, so that the two groups seem to appear together at the ZDF-Hitparade television show.

The single peaked at No. 35 on Oricon's weekly singles chart, staying in the list for three weeks.

==== Track listings ====
CD single
No.	Title	Lyrics	Music	Arrangement	Length
1.	"Dschinghis Khan Tartar Mix" (Jingisu Kan Tarutaru Mikkusu (ジンギスカン タルタルミックス))	Bernd Meinunger; Iori Yamamoto	Ralph Siegel	Kaoru Ōkubo	4:10
2.	"Dschinghis Khan" (Jingisu Kan (ジンギスカン))	Meinunger; Yamamoto	Siegel	Dance Man	3:12
3.	"Dschinghis Khan" (Original Version)	Meinunger	Siegel	Siegel	3:06
Total length:					10:28

Single V
No.	Title	Lyrics	Music	Arrangement	Length
1.	"Dschinghis Khan Tartar Mix"	Meinunger; Yamamoto	Siegel	Ōkubo	4:18
2.	"Dschinghis Khan Tartar Mix (β Ver.)" ((ジンギスカン タルタルミックス(β Ver.)))	Meinunger; Yamamoto	Siegel	Dance Man	2:08
3.	"Making Eizō" ((メイキング映像; "Making-of"))				5:43
Total length:					11:58

==== Chart history ====
Chart (2008)	Peak position	Weeks on chart	Sales	
Chart (2008)	Peak position	Weeks on chart	First week	Total
Japan (Oricon Weekly Singles Chart)	35	3	2,847	

=== Other covers ===
- Swedish dansband Vikingarna released a Swedish-language version of the song, "Djingis Khan", on the 1979 album Kramgoa låtar 7 and as a 1979 single with "Annie's sång" acting as B-side. They also scored a Svensktoppen hit with the song for 10 weeks between 24 June-26 August 1979, including topping the chart.
- Spanish singer Iván published a version with unrelated lyrics under the title "Sin Amor" (1979).
- Hong Kong Cantopop singer George Lam released a Cantonese cover of the song "Cheng Ji Si Han" (成吉思汗), which is included in his 1979 album Choice (抉擇).
- In Chile, the musical group Malibú published a version in Spanish, called "Genghis Khan" (1979).
- A Thai language version of this song was released by the Thai band Royal Sprites in 1979.
- "Yidden", a cover with unrelated Yiddish lyrics, first recorded by Mordechai Ben David in 1986, is a popular Jewish line dance.
- Another version of this song was performed by Die Apokalyptischen Reiter on the Dschinghis Khan EP (1998).
- The Korean dance/hip-hop group Koyote have also made a cover of the song, "Aja! Aja!" (아자! 아자!), which appears on their 2007 compilation album Dance Best and 9.5.
- A spoof version of this song is routinely performed by the comedy group Blondon Boys, in the Chilean variety late show Morandé con Compañía. It is called "Somos heterosexuales por opción" ("We are heterosexual by choice").
- Turkish parody group, Grup Vitamin covered this song as Hayriye in their 1994 album, Aşkın Gözyaşları (Tears of Love in Turkish).
- An uncredited in-house cover of Dschinghis Khan appeared in the arcade rhythm game pop'n music 10. The song was exclusive to that version, and is not available in current versions.
- Brazilian pop band The Fevers released a Portuguese version in 1980 called "Genghis Khan".

== See also ==
- Rasputin, a 1978 disco hit by Boney M. about the Russian historical figure
- Josephine Superstar, Phylicia Rashad's 1978 disco concept album about the life of Josephine Baker
