= Tsukiatteru no ni Kataomoi =

Single by Berryz Kobo

from the album 5 (Five)
- Released: November 28, 2007 (Japan)
- Genre: J-pop
- Label: Piccolo Town
- Songwriter: Tsunku
- Producer: Tsunku

Berryz Kobo singles chronology
"Kokuhaku no Funsui Hiroba" (2007)	"Tsukiatteru no ni Kataomoi" (2007)	"Dschinghis Khan" (2008)

Music video
- "Tsukiatteru no ni Kataomoi" - YouTube

"Tsukiatteru no ni Kataomoi" (付き合ってるのに片思い) is the 15th single by the Japanese girl idol group Berryz Kobo. It was released in Japan on November 28, 2007, and debuted at number 6 in the weekly Oricon singles chart.

== Track listings ==
=== CD single ===
1. "Tsukiatteru no ni Kataomoi" (付き合ってるのに片思い)
2. "Warera! Berryz Kamen" (我ら！Berryz仮面)
3. "Tsukiatteru no ni Kataomoi" (Instrumental)

Limited Edition DVD

1. "Tsukiatteru no ni Kataomoi" (Dance Shot Ver.)

=== DVD single "Tsukiatteru no ni Kataomoi" Event V ===
1. "Tsukiatteru no ni Kataomoi" (Dance Close-up Ver.)
2. Interview (インタビュー)

== Charts ==
Chart (2007)	Peak position
Japan (Oricon Weekly Singles Chart)	6
