= Madayade =

"Madayade Not Yet"

Single by Berryz Kobo
- B-side: Furarepattan (フラれパターン, "Pattern of Being Dumped")
- Released: (Japan)
- Recorded: 2008
- Genre: J-pop
- Label: Piccolo Town
- Songwriter: Tsunku
- Producer: Tsunku

Berryz Kobo singles chronology
"Yuke Yuke Monkey Dance" (2008)	"Madayade; Not Yet" (2008)	"Dakishimete Dakishimete" (2009)

Music video
- "Madayade" on YouTube

"Madayade" (stylized as MADAYADE) is Berryz Kobo's 18th single. It was released on November 5, 2008 and debuted at number 6 in the weekly Oricon singles chart.

== Charts ==
Chart (2008)	Peak position
Japan (Oricon Weekly Singles Chart)	6
