= Norbert Daum =

Austrian musician and conductor

- Born: 6 September 1948 (age 77); Braunau am Inn, Austria
- Occupations: Music conductor, composer
- Years active: 1965 – present

Norbert Daum (born 6 September 1948) is an Austrian musician and conductor. He often works with Ralph Siegel. Daum conducted entries in 7 years of the Eurovision Song Contest, during 1979–1994.

== Career ==
=== Work as an arranger ===
Daum was born in Braunau am Inn. He studied the violin, guitar, and piano as well as composition and conducting. Between 1965 and 1971, he was a member of the beat band The Substitutes. Since 1971, Daum has lived in Munich, where he met composer and producer Ralph Siegel, for whom he wrote orchestrations in countless productions. As a freelancer, Daum wrote more than 3000 orchestrations and worked with numerous artists in all genres, varying from crossover and outright classical music to German folk music and with artists such as Vicky Leandros, Karel Gott, Demis Roussos, and Die Jungen Tenöre. He arranged Gilbert Bécaud’s 1985 French chart success ‘Desiree’. He also worked in film and television music.

=== Eurovision Song Contest ===
Daum is probably best remembered as one of the conductors at the Eurovision Song Contest, where he conducted a total of seven entries (five years for Germany and two for Luxembourg). He conducted the entries for Eurovision in 1979, 1980, 1982, 1985, 1992, 1993 and 1994. In 1982 he had the honour of conducting the winning entry for Germany that year, which was sung by Nicole. With the exception of 1993, all the other ones which Daum conducted were all written by Siegel.
