= Nanchū Koi o Yatterū You Know? =

Single by Berryz Kobo

from the album Dai 2 Seichōki
- B-side: "Yume de Do Up"
- Released: June 8, 2005 (Japan)
- Genre: J-pop; electropop
- Label: Piccolo Town
- Songwriter: Tsunku
- Producer: Tsunku

Berryz Kobo singles chronology
"Special Generation" (2005)	"Nanchū Koi o Yatterū You Know?" (2005)	"21ji made no Cinderella" (2005)

Music video
- "Nanchū Koi o Yatterū You Know?" - YouTube

"Nanchū Koi o Yatterū You Know?" (なんちゅう恋をやってるぅ YOU KNOW?) is the 7th single by the Japanese girl idol group Berryz Kobo. It was released in Japan on June 8, 2005, and debuted at number 5 in the daily Oricon singles chart and at number 13 in the weekly Oricon singles chart.

The title song was used as an ending theme in the Kids Station anime Patariro Saiyūki! (パタリロ西遊記!).

== Track listings ==
=== CD single ===
1. "Nanchū Koi o Yatterū You Know?" (なんちゅう恋をやってるぅ YOU KNOW?)
2. "Yume de Do Up" (夢でドゥーアップ)
3. "Nanchū Koi wo Yatterū You Know?" (Instrumental)

=== DVD single "Nanchū Koi o Yatterū You Know?" Single V ===
1. "Nanchū Koi o Yatterū You Know?"
2. "Nanchū Koi wo Yatterū You Know?" (Dance Shot Ver.)
3. Making-of (メイキング映像, Making Eizô)

== Charts ==
Charts (2005)	Peak position
Japan (Oricon Weekly Singles Chart)	13
