= 1st Chō Berryz =

Studio album by Berryz Kobo
- Released: July 7, 2004
- Genre: J-pop
- Length: 45:39
- Label: Piccolo Town
- Producer: Tsunku

Berryz Kobo chronology
1st Chō Berryz (2004)	Dai 2 Seichōki (2005)

Singles from 1st Chō Berryz
- 1. "Anata Nashi de wa Ikite Yukenai" Released: 3 March 2004; 2. "Fighting Pose wa Date ja nai!" Released: 28 April 2004; 3. "Piriri to Yukō!" Released: 26 May 2004

Music videos
- Anata Nashi de wa Ikite Yukenai on YouTube
- Fighting Pose wa Date ja nai! on YouTube
- Piriri to Yukō! on YouTube

1st Chō Berryz (1st 超ベリーズ, Fāsuto Chō Berīzu; First Super Berryz) is the first full-length album by J-pop group Berryz Kobo. It was released on 7 July 2004. It was associated with the Hello!Project. The group Berryz Kobo had several other albums after this and also collaborated with the anime series Inazuma Eleven for their closing theme song.

== Release ==
"Anata Nashi de wa Ikite Yukenai" (あなたなしでは生きてゆけない; "I Can't Live Without You") is the first single taken from 1st Chō Berryz. It was released on 3 March 2004. The single ranked 18th in the Oricon Weekly Singles Chart.

The second single, "Fighting Pose wa Date ja Nai!" (ファイティングポーズはダテじゃない!, Faitingu Pōzu wa Date ja Nai!; "A Fighting Pose Isn't Showy!"), was released on 28 April 2004, and debuted at number 25 in the weekly Oricon singles chart. The third single, "Piriri to Yukō!" (ピリリと行こう!; "Let's Spice Things Up!"). was released on 26 May 2004, under the Piccolo Town label (PKCP-5040). It was also released as a Single V, on 9 June 2004. Risako Sugaya and Momoko Tsugunaga are the "centre" members on this single. Its peak position on the Oricon chart was #36.

== Track listing ==
1. "Anata Nashi de wa Ikite Yukenai" (あなたなしでは生きてゆけない; "Can't Live Without You")
2. "Piriri to Yukō!" (ピリリと行こう!; "Let's Spice Things Up!")
3. ~"Nicchoku ~Geinōjin no Kaiwa~" (日直 ～芸能人の会話～; "Day Job- An Entertainer's Talk")
4. "Fighting Pose wa Date ja nai!" (ファイティングポーズはダテじゃない!; "A Fighting Pose Isn't Showy!")
5. "Koi wa Hippari Dako" (恋はひっぱりだこ; "Love is Demanding")
6. "Semi" (蝉; "Cicada")
7. "Anshinkan" (安心感; "Relief")
8. "Kozukai up Daisakusen" (小遣いup大作戦)
9. "Today is My Birthday"
10. "Bye Bye Mata ne" (Bye Bye またね)
11. "Anata Nashi de wa Ikite Yukenai (Funky Remix)" (あなたなしでは生きてゆけない (FUNKY Remix))
12. "Hello! no Theme (Berryz Kōbō Version)" (Hello!のテーマ (Berryz工房 Version); "Hello! Theme (Berryz Kōbō Version))

== Charts ==
Chart (2004)	Peak position	Weeks on chart	Sales	
Chart (2004)	Peak position	Weeks on chart	First week	Total
Japan (Oricon Daily Albums Chart)	7			
Japan (Oricon Weekly Albums Chart)	18	3	11,209	14,816

"Faitingu Pōzu wa Date ja Nai!"
Chart (2004)	Peak position
Japan (Oricon Weekly Singles Chart)	25
