= Maasa Sudo =

Japanese actress, singer, and tarento (born 1992)

- 須藤 茉麻
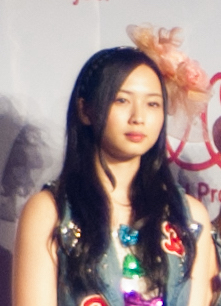
- in 2012
- Born: July 3, 1992 (age 34); Tokyo, Japan
- Occupations: Singer; actress
- Years active: 2002–present
- Musical career
- Genres: J-pop
- Instruments: Vocals; Guitar
- Label: Piccolo Town
- Formerly of: Berryz Kobo; Hello! Project Kids; Hello! Project

Maasa Sudo (須藤 茉麻, Sudō Maasa; born July 3, 1992) is a Japanese actress, singer, and tarento. She is a former member of Berryz Kobo, a J-pop idol group within Hello! Project.

== Career ==
Sudo was born in Tokyo. In 2002, she successfully passed the Hello! Project Kids audition. Sudo was a member of the group Berryz Kobo from 2004 to 2015. In March 2009, she released her first Photobook, called "Maasa". In 2010, it was confirmed that she was going to be the lead-actress of the movie Light Novel no Tanoshii Kakikata!, based on a light novel with the same name, together with former Hello Pro Egg Arisa Noto, Hisanori Sato and others. The movie premiered in cinemas in Japan in December 2010, and the DVD was released March 3, 2011. Maasa played the role of "Tsurugi Yabusame".

== Filmography ==
=== Film ===
Year	Title	Role	Notes	Ref.
2002	Mini-Moni the Movie: Okashi na Daibōken!	Purple Fairy		
2010	Light Novel no Tanoshii Kakikata	Tsurugi Yabusame	Lead role	
2011	Ōsama Game	Tomoko Shimizu		
2018	Yassadaruman	Satomi Akahata		

=== Television ===
Year	Title	Role	Notes	Ref.
2002−2003	Hello! Morning: The Way of the Kappa	Herself		
2003	54th NHK Kōhaku Uta Gassen	Back dancer	Performer: Aya Matsuura − "Nee?"	
2005	56th NHK Kōhaku Uta Gassen	Back dancer	Performer: Aya Matsuura − "Ki ga Tsukeba Anata", Morning Musume − "Love Machine"	
2006	57th NHK Kōhaku Uta Gassen	Back dancer	Performer: GAM & Morning Musume − "Thanks!", "Aruiteru", and "Ambitious! Yashinteki de Ii Jan"	
2009	Inazuma Eleven	Reika Midō (voice)	Episode: "Ichinose! The Greatest Crisis!!"	
2011	Sūgaku Joshi Gakuen	Fuyumi Okubo	12 episodes	
2012	Hanchō: Keishichō Asaka Han	Kaho Ōtomo	Episode: "The School Girls Saw!"	
2012	Juhō 2405: Watashi ga Shinu Wake	Haruka Sawatari	2 episodes	
2015	Minami-kun no Koibito	Nurse	Episode: "I Know I'm Useless"	

=== Theater ===
Year	Title	Role	Notes	Ref.
2015	Super Danganronpa 2 Sayonara Zetsubo Gakuen THE STAGE (スーパーダンガンロンパ2 さよなら絶望学園 THE STAGE)	Tsumiki Mikan		
2024	7 Seeds: Spring Chapter (7SEEDS～春の章～)	Chisa Taiami		

=== Radio ===
- Berryz Kobo Beritsuu! (April 10, 2009 – current) (Co-host: Captain and Tokunaga Chinami)
