= Miyabi Natsuyaki =

Japanese singer (born 1992)

- 夏焼雅
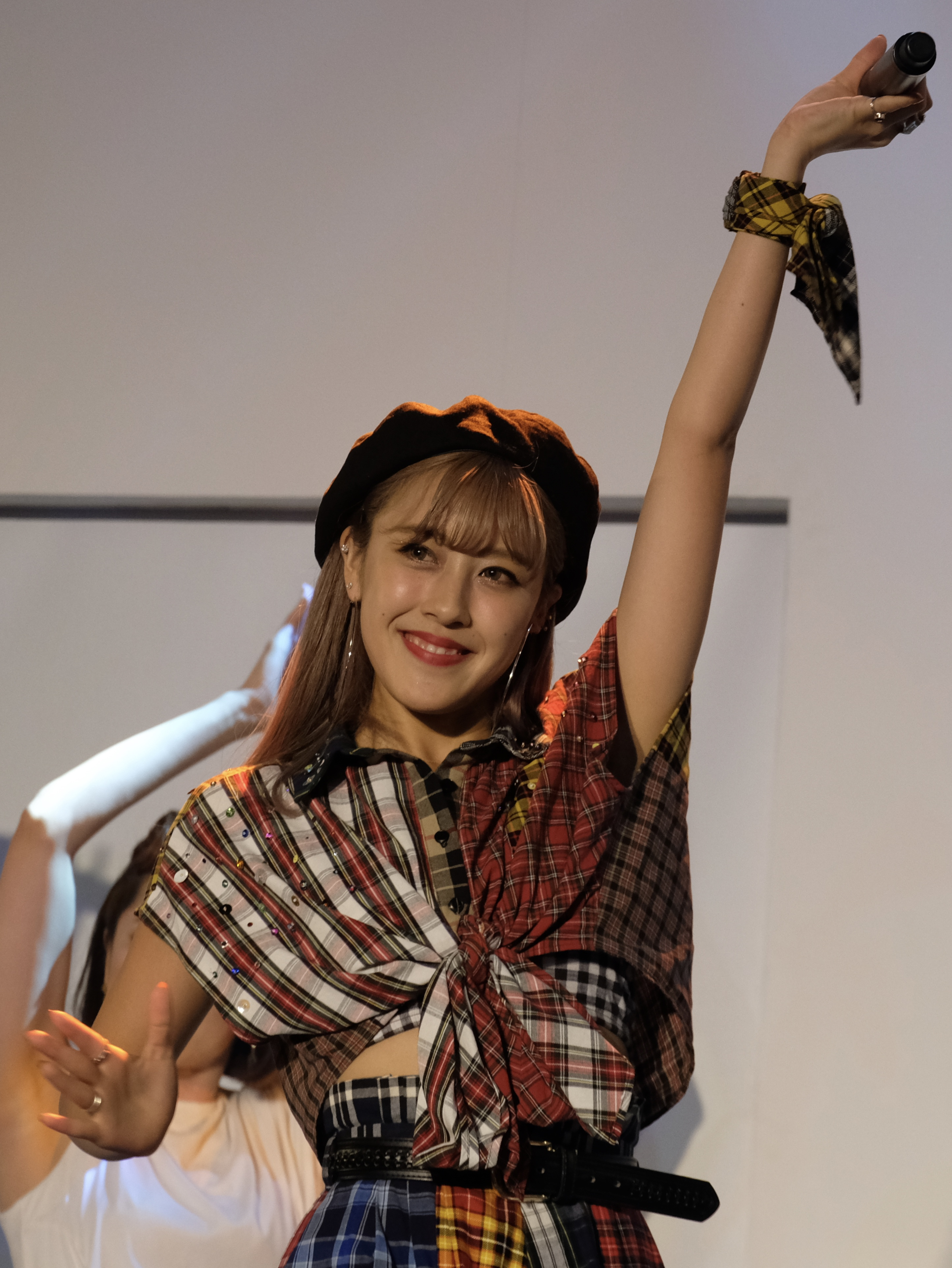
- Miyabi Natsuyaki at the 2nd ASEAN-Japan TV Festival in 2017
- Born: August 25, 1992 (age 33)
- Occupations: Singer; Actress
- Musical career
- Genres: J-pop
- Years active: 2002–present
- Label: Piccolo Town
- Formerly of: Pink Cres.; Berryz Kobo; Buono!; Aa!; Hello! Project Kids
- Website: Hello! Project.com

Miyabi Natsuyaki (夏焼 雅, Natsuyaki Miyabi; born August 25, 1992, Chiba Prefecture) is a Japanese singer. Natsuyaki began her singing career in 2002 when she joined Hello! Project Kids, a child pop group, under the idol musical collective Hello! Project. After releasing music in the sub-group Aa!, Natsuyaki became a member of the girl group Berryz Kobo, of which she was also the group's sub-leader, from 2004 to 2014. In addition, she was also a member of the sub-group Buono! from 2009 to 2017. After Berryz Kobo went on indefinite hiatus, Natsuyaki formed the girl group Pink Cres. in 2016, which remained active until 2021.

== Career ==
=== 2002–2004: Hello! Project Kids ===
In 2002, Natsuyaki successfully passed the Hello! Project Kids' Audition alongside other members of Berryz Kobo. As a member of Berryz Kobo, she participated in the band's weekly radio show Berryz Kobo Kiritsu! Rei! Chakuseki!. That same year, she was cast in Koinu Dan no Monogatari, however she did not have a large part due to her age. Many members of Hello! Project Kids and Morning Musume participated in this film.

In 2004, Hello! Project participated in a large shuffle group that produced one single, "All For One & One For All!". This song is considered one of the themes of Hello! Project. In addition to the H.P. All Stars, she was placed in two shuffle units, Aa! and Sexy Otonajan. The group was made up of Miki Fujimoto from Morning Musume, Megumi Murakami from Cute and Miyabi. They produced one song called "Onna, Kanashii, Otona".

Earlier, in 2003, she was chosen to join the group Aa!, which consisted of fellow Hello! Project Kids member Airi Suzuki and was led by then Morning Musume member Reina Tanaka. The group released one single titled "First Kiss," on October 29, 2003. The group went on hiatus until the Hello! Project 2009 Summer tour at which many old shuffle units were renewed. During these concerts, Tanaka was replaced by Saho Akari, since Reina had joined the unit High King. The unit released one song, titled "YES YES YES" as part of the "Happy Wedding Song Cover" album released by Hello! Project.

=== 2004–2016: Berryz Kobo and Buono! ===
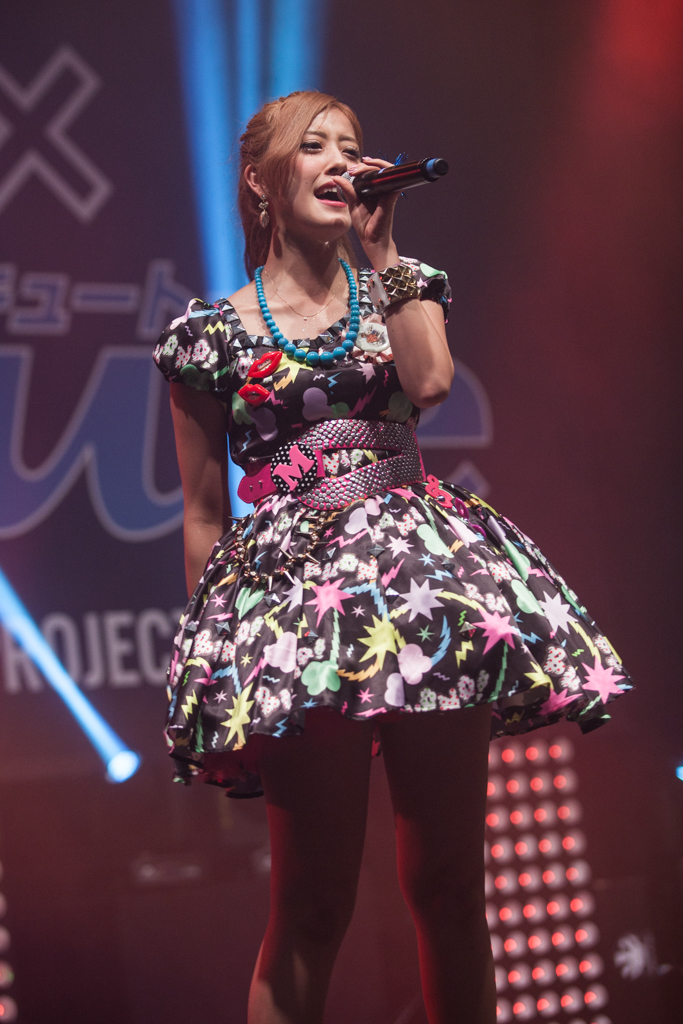
Natsuyaki performing at Japan Expo 2014

Miyabi joined Buono! alongside Berryz Kobo group-mate Momoko Tsugunaga and Airi Suzuki from Cute. The unit was officially announced at the Nakayoshi magazine Festival 2007 on July 21, 2007, at Tokyo's Sunshine City in Ikebukuro. They sang both the opening ("Kokoro no Tamago") and ending ("Honto no Jibun") themes for the anime adaptation of the Shugo Chara! manga. Buono! continued to record the ending and opening themes for the first season of the anime. During the second season, Buono! recorded only the ending themes, as the opening themes were handled by Shugo Chara Egg! and Guardians 4, two other groups formed for the sake of performing Shugo Chara! music.

=== 2016–2021: Pink Cres. ===
After Berryz Kobo went on indefinite hiatus, Miyabi took a one-month break and then joined the YouTube show "Green Room" with fellow former Berryz Kobo member Chinami Tokunaga, which was uploaded weekly and centered around the behind the scenes aspects of Up Front Group members.

In August 2015, Miyabi announced she was creating a new girl group and held auditions on July 1, 2015. The group, Pink Cres., was later revealed at Buono!'s 2016 Buono! Festa concert.

The group disbanded in 2021.

=== 2021-present: Solo career ===
In January 2026, she confirmed she is married

== Discography ==
=== Studio albums ===
#	Title	Release date	Information
1	"Laugh and Peace" (ラフ・アンド・ピース)	2022	Collaborative album with Reina Tanaka & Ai Takahashi

=== Singles ===
#	Title	Release date	Information
1	"Furusato " (ふるさと, Hometown)	2011	Morning Musume cover
2	"Koi wo Shichaimashita!" (恋をしちゃいました!, I Fell in Love!)	2011	Tanpopo cover
3	"LOVE Namida Iro" (LOVE涙色)	2011	Aya Matsuura cover
4	"Oyoge! Taiyaki-kun" (およげ！たいやきくん)	2021	Only released for digital purchase and download; with Reina Tanaka & Natsuyaki Miyabi; cover of Masato Shimon's 1971 song; later released as part of the Laugh and Peace collaborative CD

== Solo photobooks ==
- Miyabi ~ Miyabi Natsuyaki Photobook (Miyabi～夏焼 雅 写真集; Released May 31, 2007)
- Berryz Kobo Natsuyaki Miyabi Photobook "GLOW" (Berryz工房 夏焼雅 写真集 『 GLOW 』; Released November 15, 2013)

== Acting ==
=== Television ===
- Little Hospital (リトル・ホスピタル) (2003)

=== Movies ===
- Koinu Dan no Monogatari (2002)
- Promise Land ~Clovers no Daibōken~ (2004)
- Gomennasai (October 29, 2011)
- Ōsama Game (2011)

=== Radio ===
- Berryz Kobo Kiritsu! Rei! Chakuseki! (March 30, 2005 – March 31, 2009)
- Tsuukai! Berryz Okoku (July 3, 2009 – March 30, 2012) (Co-host: Sugaya Risako and Kumai Yurina)
