= Yurina Kumai =

Japanese pop singer and fashion model (born 1993)

Yurina Kumai 熊井 友理奈
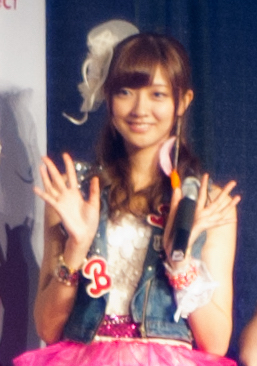
- in 2012

Background information
- Born: August 3, 1993 (age 33); Kanagawa, Japan
- Origin: Tokyo, Japan
- Genre: J-pop
- Occupations: Singer; model
- Years active: 2002–present
- Label: Piccolo Town
- Formerly of: Berryz Kobo; Hello! Project Kids; Hello! Project; Guardians 4
- Spouse: Takashi Osuga (m. 2023)
- Website: Official profile

Yurina Kumai (熊井 友理奈, Kumai Yurina; born August 3, 1993) is a Japanese model and singer. Kumai began her career as a member of Hello! Project Kids in 2002. In 2004, she debuted as a member of Berryz Kobo, a girl group associated with the musical collective Hello! Project. During her time with Berryz Kobo and Hello! Project, Kumai also appeared in Hello! Project's other musical projects, such as Guardians 4. In 2015, Kumai left Hello! Project following Berryz Kobo's indefinite hiatus in the same year.

Born in Kanagawa, Japan. She belongs to UP-FRONT CREATE and Tateoka Office.

== Career ==
- June 30, 2002 - passed Hello! Project Kids audition and became a member of Hello! Project Kids.
- March 3, 2004 - made a major debut as a member of Berryz Kobo.
- August 29, 2007 - released the first solo photobook "Yurina".
- April 3, 2009 - chosen a member of Guardians 4.
- December 17, 2011 - premiere of the movie "Ōsama Game", where she had her first starring role.
- October 28, 2012 - opened an official blog “Enjoy!”.
- March 3, 2015 - Berryz Kobo’s activities suspended indefinitely.
- September 30, 2015 - taking part in her first model shooting session reported on her personal blog.
- January 14, 2016 - presented a new dress by fashion designer Yumi Katsura at the “Yumi Katsura ParisColle Dress Presentation” held in Tokyo.
- February 16, 2016 - made her runway debut at “YUMI KATSURA 2016 GRAND COLLECTION IN TOKYO” held in Tokyo International Forum.
- May 1, 2018 - it was announced that she would also belong to Tateoka Office as a model.
- March 20, 2019 - appeared in Tae Ashida’s Fall Winter 2019 show at “Japan Fashion Week (in Tokyo)”, held in Grand Hyatt Tokyo.
- August 4, 2022 - it was announced that she was appointed as the creative director of the fashion brand "LANSE".
- January 1, 2023 - moved from J.P ROOM to UP-FRONT CREATE.

== Personal life ==
On August 10, 2023, Kumai announced her marriage to fellow model Takashi Osuga.

== Filmography ==
=== Television ===
- Little Hospital (January - March 2003, TV Tokyo)
- Musume Dokyu! (娘DOKYU!) (April 5, 2005 – May 18, 2005, TV Tokyo)
- The Girls Live (January 17, 2014 - , TV Tokyo)
- King's Brunch (October 10, 2015 - March 27, 2021, TBS Television)
- Ichiya Zuke (March 27, 2017 – March 2018, TV Tokyo)
- Kanaful TV (April 1, 2018 - , TV Kanagawa)

=== Radio ===
- Berryz Kobo Kiritsu! Rei! Chakuseki! (Berryz工房 起立!礼!着席!) (March 30, 2005 – March 31, 2009)
- Tsūkai! Berryz Ōkoku (July 3, 2009 – March 30, 2012) (Co-host: Sugaya Risako and Natsuyaki Miyabi)
- BZS1422 (July 8, 2012 – March 1, 2015, Radio Nippon) (Co-host: Chinami Tokunaga)
- Maasa Sudo, Miyabi Natsuyaki and Yurina Kumai's Radio Triangle!!! (February 19 – July 21, 2026, sheeta Platform)

=== Commercials ===
- Japan meat information service center, J Beef “Oniku Sukisuki” (2003)
- Base Ball Bear “(WHAT IS THE) LOVE & POP?” (2009)
- Takashimaya “Spring All-Store Super Point Week” (2017)
- Toyota U group “KINTO” (2019)
- T&D Insurance Group, "Brand Concept" (2026)
- NTT Docomo iPhone "Poinko and the Countdown" (2026)

=== Movies ===
- Koinu Dan no Monogatari (2002, Toei)
- Hotaru no Hoshi (ほたるの星) (2004, Kadokawa)
- Ōsama Game (2011, BS-TBS) as Chiemi Honda

=== Solo DVDs ===
- Photobook “Yurina” making DVD 〜Special edition〜 (October 20, 2007, UP-FRONT WORKS)
- Photobook “FLOWERAGE” making DVD 〜Special edition〜 (September 16, 2009, UP-FRONT WORKS)
- Photobook “KumaSpo!” making DVD 〜Special edition〜 (January 28, 2011, UP-FRONT WORKS)
- one day in autumn (December 22, 2011, UP-FRONT WORKS)
- Lily (April 18, 2012, UP-FRONT WORKS)
- brand new day (October 5, 2013, UP-FRONT WORKS)

== Bibliography ==
=== Photobooks ===
- Yurina (August 29, 2007, KIDS NET, ISBN 978-4-04-894500-4)
- FLOWERAGE (July 25, 2009, KIDS NET, ISBN 978-4-04-895049-7)
- KumaSpo! Alo-Hello! (December 17, 2010, KIDS NET, ISBN 978-4-04-895411-2)

=== Books ===
- Complex ni Sayōnara! (October 15, 2018, ODYSSEY BOOKS, ISBN 978-4-8470-8155-2)
