= Saki Shimizu =

Japanese singer

Saki Shimizu 清水 佐紀
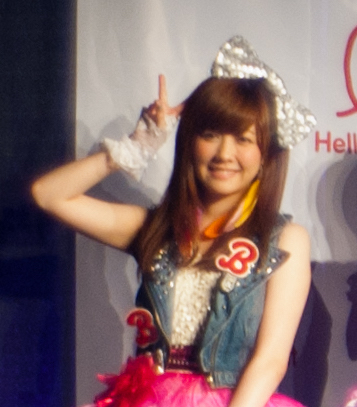
- in 2012

Background information
- Born: November 22, 1991 (age 34)
- Origin: Tokyo, Japan
- Genres: J-pop
- Occupation: Singer
- Years active: 2002–2021
- Label: Piccolo Town
- Formerly of: Berryz Kobo; H.P. All Stars; Hello! Project Kids; ZYX; High-King
- Website: Hello! Project.com

Saki Shimizu (清水 佐紀, Shimizu Saki; born November 22, 1991) is a Japanese former singer. Her career began in 2002 when she passed the audition for Hello! Project Kids, an all-female teen pop group within Hello! Project. She continued to sing in that group and became a part of two smaller groups composed of Hello! Project Kids members, Berryz Kobo and ZYX. She is captain of J-pop band Berryz Kobo.

== Early life ==
Shimizu was born in Tokyo, Japan. In 2002, she passed the Hello! Project Kids Audition.

== Career ==
As a member of Berryz Kobo, she participated in their radio show Berryz Kobo Kiritsu! Rei! Chakuseki!.

She was cast as one of the main characters in "Koinu Dan no Monogatari". Many members of Hello! Project Kids and Morning Musume participated in this film.

In 2003, Shimizu was chosen to join the group ZYX, which consisted of five Hello! Project Kids and Mari Yaguchi, who acted as a mentor. They released two singles: "Iku ZYX! Fly High" and "Shiroi Tokyo". They remained active until 2004, when Saki and Momoko Tsugunaga became members of Berryz Kobo.

In 2004, Hello! Project participated in a large shuffle group that produced the single, "All For One & One For All!" This song is considered one of the themes of Hello! Project.

On December 31, 2006, Shimizu took the stage at the 57th edition of Kōhaku Uta Gassen as a backup dancer in Morning Musume's performance of Aruiteru, along with the remaining members of Berryz Kobo, Country Musume and Cute.

In 2008, Shimizu became a member of Hello! Project's new unit High-King. This shuffle unit came out with the single, "C\C (Cinderella Complex)" (Ｃ＼Ｃ (シンデレラ＼コンプレックス)), to promote Morning Musume's Cinderella Musical.

In March 2021, she announced that she had married, and that she would retire in November.

She retired from the entertainment world on November 23, 2021.

== Hello! Project groups and units ==
- Hello! Project Kids
- ZYX (2003–?)
- Berryz Kobo (2004–2015)
- H.P. All Stars (2004)
- High-King (2008–2015)
- Hello! Project Mobekimasu (2011)
- Green Fields (2012–2015)

== Appearances ==
=== Movies ===
- Koinu Dan no Monogatari (2002)
- Promise Land ~Clovers no Daibōken~ (2004)

=== Radio ===
- Berryz Kobo Kiritsu! Rei! Chakuseki! lit. "Berryz Workshop, Rise! Bow! Be seated!" (March 30, 2005 – March 31, 2009)
- Berryz Kobo Beritsuu! (April 10, 2009 – current) (Co-host: Tokunaga Chinami and Sudo Maasa)

=== Internet ===
- 8th Hello Pro Video Chat (Hello! Project on Flets) (May 2, 2005)
