= Chinami Tokunaga =

Japanese singer (born 1992)

Chinami Tokunaga 徳永 千奈美
- Born: May 22, 1992 (age 34)
- Origin: Kanagawa, Japan
- Genres: Japanese pop
- Occupations: Singer
- Years active: 2002–2015
- Label: Piccolo Town
- Formerly of: Berryz Kobo; Hello! Project Kids; Hello! Project

Chinami Tokunaga (徳永 千奈美, Tokunaga Chinami) (born May 22, 1992) is a Japanese singer. She is a former member of the J-pop idol group Berryz Kobo.

== History ==
Tokunaga was born in Kanagawa, Japan. In 2002, she passed the Hello! Project Kids audition and became a member of Hello! Project. She retired from the entertainment industry on February 28, 2021, and around the same timeframe she got married and gave birth to a child.

== Hello! Project groups and units ==
- Hello! Project Kids
- ZYX
- H.P. All Stars (2004)
- Berryz Kobo (2004–present)
- Hello! Project Mobekimasu (2011)
- DIY (DIY♡) (2012–present)

== Acts ==
=== Movies ===
- Koinu Dan no Monogatari (December 14, 2002)
- Promise Land ~Clovers no Daibōken~ (July 17, 2004)
- Ōsama Game (December 17, 2011)

=== Radio ===
- Berryz Kobo Kiritsu! Rei! Chakuseki! (March 30, 2005 – March 31, 2009)
- Berryz Kobo Beritsuu! (April 10, 2009 – current) (co-host Captain and Sudo Maasa)

=== Internet ===
- 12th Hello Pro Video Chat (Hello! Project on Flets) (June 3, 2005)

=== Solo photobooks ===
1. Chinami (September 11, 2009, Kadokawa Shoten, ISBN 978-4048950589)
2. Metamorphose (metamorphose, Metamorufōze) (October 12, 2012, Wani Books, ISBN 978-4847044960)
