= Berryz Kobo =

Japanese girl group

Berryz Kobo Berryz工房
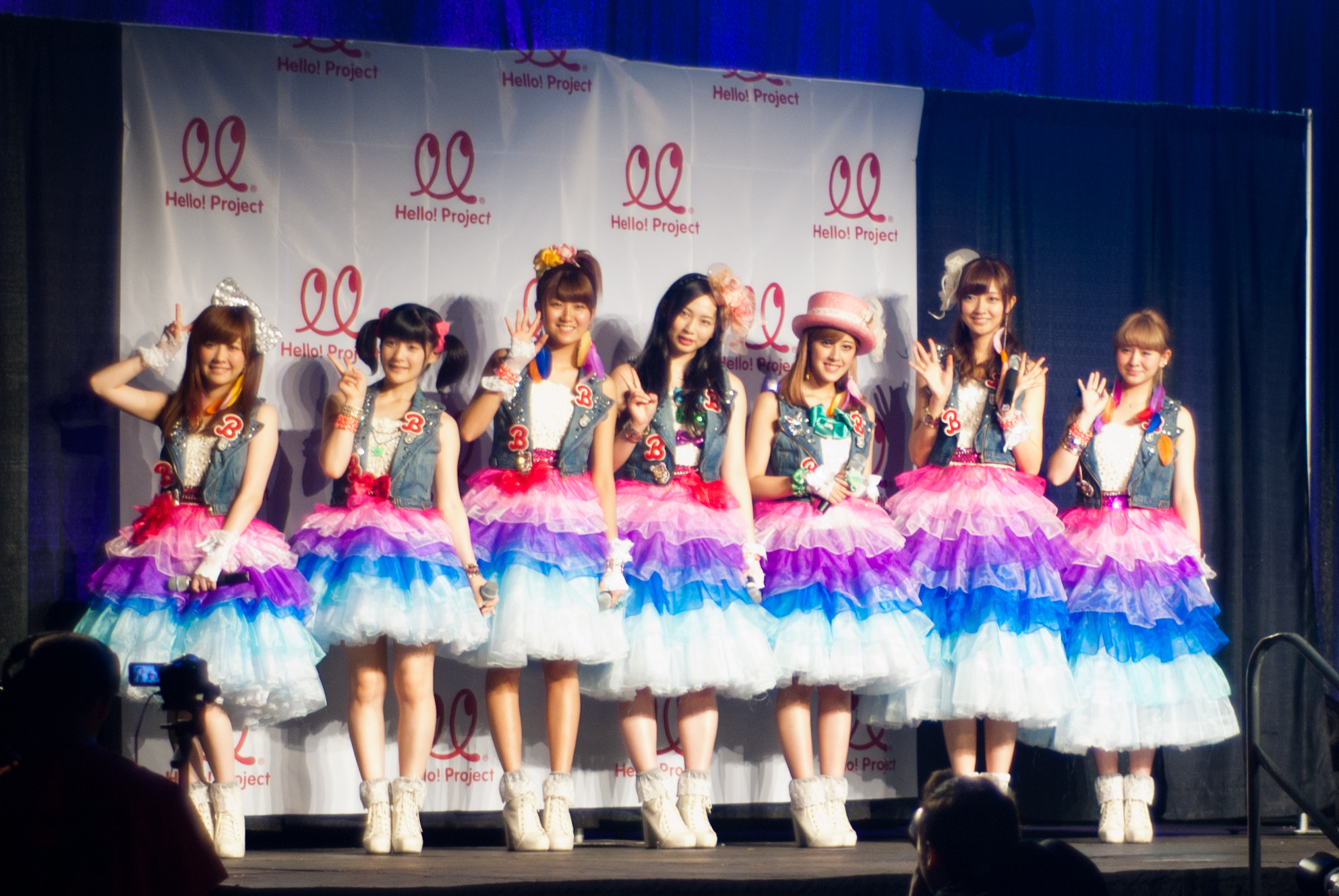
- Berryz Kobo in 2012. From left to right: Shimizu, Tsugunaga, Tokunaga, Sudo, Natsuyaki, Kumai, and Sugaya.

Background information
- Origin: Japan
- Genres: J-pop
- Years active: 2004–2015 (indefinite hiatus)
- Label: Piccolo Town
- Spinoffs: Buono!; Guardians 4
- Spinoff of: Hello! Project Kids
- Past members: Saki Shimizu; Momoko Tsugunaga; Chinami Tokunaga; Maasa Sudo; Miyabi Natsuyaki; Yurina Kumai; Risako Sugaya; Maiha Ishimura

Berryz Kobo (Berryz工房, Berryz Kōbō; lit. "Berryz Workshop") was a Japanese idol girl group formed by Up-Front Promotion in 2004 and associated with Hello! Project. The group's members consisted of Hello! Project Kids members Saki Shimizu, Momoko Tsugunaga, Miyabi Natsuyaki, Chinami Tokunaga, Maasa Sudo, Yurina Kumai, and Risako Sugaya; Maiha Ishimura left the group in 2005.

Berryz Kobo debuted with their first single in March of the same year. In 2007, Berryz Kobo became the youngest act ever to give a solo concert at Saitama Super Arena. In 2008, the group received the Best Asian Newcomer Award at the Asia Song Festival and a Cable Music Award at the 41st Japan Cable Awards ceremony. As of December 2014, the group had released 36 singles, nine studio albums, one EP and one compilation album. Berryz Kobo's combined CD and DVD sales exceeded one million copies in Japan alone.

== History ==
=== 2002–2003: Hello! Project Kids ===
All of the group's members were initially selected during the audition for Hello! Project Kids in 2002 and undertook professional training in Hello! Project.

In 2002, Maasa Sudo and Risako Sugaya appeared in the Minimoni movie Okashi na Daibōken! as members of the group 4Kids.

In 2003, some Hello! Project Kids' members were placed in bands led by Morning Musume members. Miyabi Natsuyaki was selected to be in Aa!, while Saki Shimizu and Momoko Tsugunaga were in the group ZYX. Both units were short-lived, and their activities stalled with the creation of Berryz Kobo.

=== 2004: Formation and debut ===
The formation of Berryz Kobo was announced at a Hello! Project club event on 14 January 2004. The band was composed of eight members of Hello! Project Kids, who were then known as the "starting line-up". Initially it was planned to rotate all 15 members of Hello! Project Kids through the group, which would have given Berryz Kobo's members more time for school. Later, however, the idea was dismissed, and the remaining seven Hello! Project Kids members formed the group Cute in 2005.

On 3 March 2004, the new band debuted with the single "Anata Nashi de wa Ikite Yukenai", which ranked 18th on the Oricon Weekly Singles Chart. Two more singles followed in April and May, and on 7 July the group released its first album, titled 1st Chō Berryz.

In addition to their activity as Berryz Kobo, the girls also performed as backup dancers in music videos of the newly created Hello! Project duo W.

=== 2005: First top 10 hit and Ishimura's graduation ===
The single "Special Generation" was released on 30 March 2005, and ranked seventh on the Oricon Weekly Singles Chart. It was Berryz Kobo's first single to rank in the top 10, and their first to sell more than 20,000 copies. At that time, the group's average age was less than 12 years old.

On 11 September 2005, it was announced that Maiha Ishimura would graduate from the group and Hello! Project to focus on her studies. Ishimura's graduation took place on 2 October 2005, on the last night of the Berryz Kobo autumn 2005 concert tour.

=== 2006: Jiriri Kiteru ===
The 10th single, "Jiriri Kiteru," was released on 29 March. It was ranked in sixth place on the Oricon Weekly Singles Chart, setting a new high for the group.

=== 2007: Youngest concert at Saitama Super Arena ===
In February 2007, Berryz Kobo made news headlines after it was announced that the group would be holding a concert at Saitama Super Arena on 1 April. The tickets for the two performances (a total of 20,000 seats) sold out almost two months before the premiere, and the group became the youngest act ever to perform a solo concert at the arena. At the time its members' average age was 13.8, with the previous record of 16.3 set by Morning Musume four years earlier.

On 27 June, Berryz released their 14th single "Kokuhaku no Funsui Hiroba." It ranked fourth on the Oricon Weekly Singles Chart, becoming their highest-selling single.

=== 2008: Awards and NHK Kōhaku Uta Gassen ===
On 12 March 2008 the group released "Dschinghis Khan," their first cover song and, as of 2012, their highest- selling single.

In October, Berryz Kobo participated at the 2008 Asia Song Festival in South Korea, representing Japan alongside W-inds and Anna Tsuchiya. Berryz won the festival's Best Asian Newcomer Award alongside the SM Entertainment group Shinee.

On 12 December, they performed at Sharam Q's 20th anniversary concert at the Nippon Budokan. The group took part in the 41st Japan Cable Awards (日本有線大賞, Nihon Yūsen Taishō) show at Nakano Sun Plaza on 17 December, performing "Dschinghis Khan," for which they received a Cable Music Award (有線音楽賞, Yūsen Ongaku Shō), awarded to the most requested song on the Cansystem cable radio network. The year ended with the group's debut at the 58th NHK Kōhaku Uta Gassen, an annual music show broadcast on 31 December. They performed a number together with Morning Musume and Cute.

=== 2009: Influenza and collaboration with Inazuma Eleven ===
In March, Berryz Kobo First Fan Club Tour in Hawaii '09 was held in Honolulu, Hawaii, where the band performed exclusively for the members of the Japanese fan club. It was the group's first overseas fan club tour.

The 22 March concert in Nagoya was cancelled just a few days before the date, because two members, Miyabi Natsuyaki and Risako Sugaya, were suffering from influenza.

On 25 April the girls celebrated the group's 100th solo concert in Utsunomiya, Tochigi during their spring concert tour Sono Subete no Ai ni.

On 3 June, the group released their 20th single and their first double A-side single, "Seishun Bus Guide/Rival." "Seishun Bus Guide" was a closing theme for the anime series Inazuma Eleven. On 21 June, the group held a mini-concert in South Korea, which became their first commercial solo concert outside Japan.

In autumn 2009, the group was again affected by influenza. On Tuesday, 13 October, fans were notified that Momoko Tsugunaga was diagnosed with influenza and would be absent from the concert scheduled for Saturday. The next day, Miyabi Natsuyaki was reported to be diagnosed as well after having felt sick the previous evening, and it was announced that the Sunday concert had to be cancelled due to Maasa Sudo and Risako Sugaya also having influenza. The next day, Hello! Project reported that Saki Shimizu caught influenza, affecting five of the seven members. In the beginning of November, the influenza got to Chinami Tokunaga, followed by Yurina Kumai a couple of days later; causing them to miss the 7 and 8 November concerts.

=== 2010: More Inazuma Eleven endings ===
In spring, the group performed in Bangkok, Thailand, for the first time.

On 3 March, the group released their third double A-side single, "Otakebi Boy Wao!/Tomodachi wa Tomodachi Nanda!" The single debuted on the Oricon Weekly Singles Chart at number three, making it their highest-ranking single to date. It also stayed in the top 10 for a second week, ranking ninth.

In July they released a new single, "Maji Bomber!!," which was used as an ending theme for both the anime Inazuma Eleven and the game the anime was based upon. Their next single and their final Inazuma Eleven ending theme, "Shining Power," was released on 10 November.

=== 2011: Oricon Daily number 1 and first concert in America ===
On 3 March, the anniversary of the group's debut, the group began its seventh-anniversary tour.

Berryz Kobo's 25th single "Heroine ni Narō ka!" ("Let's be Heroines") reached number one on the Oricon Daily Singles Chart for 6 March. The concert that was scheduled for 12 March in Sendai, Miyagi Prefecture, was abruptly canceled due to the 2011 Tōhoku earthquake and tsunami which hit the day before. All of the group's members were safe, but the tour had to be stopped. The concerts were either canceled or postponed until the end of March. At the end of March, Berryz Kobo released their seventh album, 7 Berryz Times.

In April, the group performed at Sakura-Con 2011, an anime convention in Seattle, Washington, United States. This was the first performance by Berryz Kobo in the United States. The group participated in events such as autograph sessions, question and answer sessions, and a concert. 3,500 people were reported to have attended the concert.

On 8 June, the group released their 26th single, "Ai no Dangan".

On 10 August, the group released their 27th single, titled "Aa, Yo ga Akeru".

=== 2012 ===
In 2012, Berryz Kobo's leader Saki Shimizu announced on her official blog that on 21 March, the new Berryz Kobo single "Be Genki! (Naseba Naru)" would be released.

The group's eighth album Ai no Album 8 was released on 22 February.

On 8–10 June, the group appeared at AnimeNEXT in Somerset, New Jersey, their second live performance in USA. On 20 June, the group released its second collaboration CD single with fellow Hello! Project Kids group Cute, named "Chō Happy Song" ("Super Happy Song.") The title tune is an overlay of two previously published songs, Berryz Kobo's "Because Happiness" and Cute's "Shiawase no Tochū" ("On the Road to Happiness") from their 2012 albums, which were composed and produced by Tsunku intentionally to form a new song when played simultaneously. The trick was originally scheduled to be announced at a summer Hello! Project concert, but was uncovered by fans in mid-April. The song became widely discussed on the Internet, and the set of three tracks, "Because Happiness", "Shiawase no Tochū", and "Chō Happy Song", was hastily released as a digital download single on 28 April.

On 25 July, the group released their 29th single, "Cha Cha Sing," a cover song of the popular Thai song "Row Mah Sing" by artist Thongchai McIntyre. The single was the group's first to include a solo song, "Momochi! Yurushite-nyan Taisō," which was performed by member Momoko Tsugunaga.

=== 2013 ===
It was announced on 19 May in Tokyo's Hibiya Park that Berryz Kobo would be holding a concert at the Nippon Budokan arena on 29 November 2013.

On 2 October, the group released their 33rd single, "Motto Zutto Issho ni Itakatta," which became their highest selling single (with a reported total of 40,845 copies,) beating Dschinghis Khan's 37,096 copies. On 11 November, Berryz Kobo held their special concert at the Nippon Budokan.

=== 2014: Tenth anniversary and indefinite suspension ===
It was announced on 2 August 2014, at the summer Hello! Project concerts that Berryz Kobo would be going on an "indefinite suspension starting Spring 2015". The girls decided together that they would like to explore other opportunities. The decision to call this an "indefinite suspension" was made since the girls felt calling this move a "disbandment" would cause Berryz Kobo to disappear or fade away. The group continued its activities until the spring of 2015, when their final appearances and performances would be announced and take place. Tsunku added he would "like to see them chase new dreams" and asked for continued support throughout their remaining time as an active group.

On 24 February 2015, Shimizu and Tokunaga announced on their blogs they would remain with the company as advisors, where they would act as the "go-between" for the staff and members. The next day Sugaya announced she would take time off to focus on her personal life. The following day Kumai stated on her blog that she would finish her university degree and would pursue a modeling career.

== Performances outside Japan ==
Berryz Kobo have performed and made appearances outside Japan numerous times.

In 2009 Mnet and Up-Front Works arranged a Berryz Kobo mini-concert in South Korea on 21 June at Yonsei University Auditorium, titled Berryz Kobo Mini Live in Korea. This was the group's first concert outside Japan.

In 2010 Berryz Kobo was chosen over Morning Musume and Cute to perform in Thailand. Their concert was held on 27 March at the Hua Mark Indoor Stadium, formally known as Rajamangala National Stadium. This was the group's second performance outside Japan.

On the last day of the group's Autumn 2010 concert tour, captain Saki Shimizu announced that they would be performing at the anime convention Sakura-Con in Seattle, the United States on 22–24 April 2011. Their American concert debut at Sakura-Con 2011 had an audience of 3,500. Fans traveled from all over the world, including many parts of the US, Canada, France, Mexico, and Japan to support the group as they celebrated their seventh year together. During the weekend the members appeared at the event's opening and closing ceremonies, participated in a live audience Q&A, held two 60-minute sessions where they signed autographs, and performed an hour-long concert consisting of 14 songs. This was the group's third performance outside Japan, and first outside Asia. Berryz Kobo was the third Hello! Project major act to perform outside Asia following Morning Musume (in Los Angeles, 2009 and Paris, 2010), and Erina Mano (in Los Angeles, 2010).

On 8–10 June 2012, the group performed at AnimeNEXT, an anime convention in Somerset, New Jersey, in the United States.

== Members ==
- Saki Shimizu - captain
- Momoko Tsugunaga
- Chinami Tokunaga
- Maasa Sudo
- Miyabi Natsuyaki - sub-captain
- Yurina Kumai
- Risako Sugaya

=== Former members ===
- Maiha Ishimura (2004–2005)

== Discography ==
Studio albums

- 1st Chō Berryz (2004)
- Dai 2 Seichōki (2005)
- 3 Natsu Natsu Mini Berryz (2006)
- 4th Ai no Nanchara Shisū (2007)
- 5 (Five) (2008)
- 6th Otakebi Album (2010)
- 7 Berryz Times (2011)
- Ai no Album 8 (2012)
- Berryz Mansion 9kai (2013)

Mini-albums

- Special! Best Mini ~2.5 Maime no Kare~ (2005)

Compilation albums

- Berryz Kobo Special Best Vol. 1 (2009)
- Berryz Kobo Special Best Vol. 2 (2014)
- Kanjuku Berryz Kobo The Final Completion Box (完熟Berryz工房 The Final Completion Box) (2015)

== Concert tours ==
The group had their first concert tour titled "2004 Natsu First Concert Tour: W Standby! Double You & Berryz Kobo!". The tour ran on August 10, 2004, to October 11, 2004, featuring Morning Musume sub-unit W which is consisting of Nozomi Tsuji and Ai Kago. It was recorded on August 13, 2004, on Saitama and was released on DVD on November 17, 2004.

== Awards ==
=== Asia Song Festival ===
Year	Nominee / work	Award	Result
2008	Berryz Kobo (group)	Best Asian Newcomer Award	Won

=== Japan Cable Awards ===
The Japan Cable Awards (日本有線大賞, Nihon Yūsen Taishō) are sponsored by the National Cable Music Broadcasters Association (全国有線音楽放送協会).

Year	Nominee / work	Award	Result
2008	"Dschinghis Khan"	Cable Music Award	Won
2008	"Dschinghis Khan"	Grand Prix*	Nominated

* awarded to the most requested song of the year on the cable radio
