= Risako Sugaya =

Japanese singer and actress

- 菅谷梨沙子
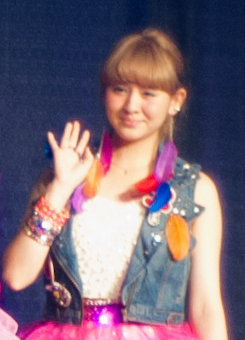
- in 2012
- Born: 4 April 1994 (age 32)
- Occupations: Singer; Actress
- Musical career
- Genres: J-pop
- Years active: 2002–2023
- Label: Piccolo Town
- Formerly of: Berryz Kobo; Hello! Project Kids; Guardians 4; v-u-den
- Website: Hello! Project.com

Risako Sugaya (菅谷 梨沙子, Sugaya Risako; born 4 April 1994) is a former Japanese singer and actress. She first gained recognition when she joined Hello! Project Kids and later became one of the lead vocalists of the girl group Berryz Kobo from 2004 to 2015.

== Career ==
=== 2002–2004: Hello! Project Kids, 4Kids ===
Sugaya was born in Kanagawa, Japan. In 2002, she auditioned for Hello! Project Kids with the song "Minimoni Hinamatsuri" by Minimoni. Her audition tape was aired on Morning Musume's variety show Hello! Morning. She was placed in the group with 14 other girls. She made her first appearance as an angel in the 2002 film Mini Moni ja Movie: Okashi na Daibōken!; she also was one of the featured artists in the movie's ending song as a member of 4Kids.

In 2003, Sugaya starred in the movie Hotaru no Hoshi (蛍の星), as Hikari, a fragile elementary school student who, with the help of her caring teacher, has a chance to be momentarily reunited with her deceased mother and overcome her emotional problems. She also starred in the drama, Shonan Kawarayane Monogatari. That year also marked her first appearance on Kōhaku Uta Gassen, as one of Aya Matsuura's backup dancers, during the 54th edition of the renowned NHK New Year program.

=== 2004–2015: Berryz Kobo ===
In early 2004, Sugaya became part of the newly formed group Berryz Kobo. Since joining the group, she has also participated in the band's weekly radio show Berryz Kobo Kiritsu! Rei! Chakuseki!. She has also, like other Hello! Project members, appeared in the Musume Dokyu! segments, namely episodes 39, 40, 54, 55, and 56. Additionally, Sugaya has done a commercial for the Nihon Shokuniku Shōhi Sōgō Center in October 2003.

Later, in 2004, she participated in singing "All for One & One for All!", a collaboration single released by all Hello! Project artists under the name "H.P. All Stars."

In August 2006, Sugaya was interviewed by MC Maki Goto in the 12th installment of the online only show Hello! Pro Hour. She later re-appeared alongside Momoko Tsugunaga on the 20th and final episode.

On 12 October 2006, Sugaya became the first member of Berryz Kobo, and the youngest of all the Hello! Project members, to release a solo photobook. Sugaya herself admitted, in an interview with Sanspo.com, to initially having doubts regarding the photoshoot, but claims to have had a pleasant experience and hopes her fans enjoy the various facets of her personality.

On 31 December 2006, Sugaya once again took the stage at the 57th NHK Kōhaku Uta Gassen as a backup dancer in Morning Musume's performance of Aruiteru, along with the remaining members of Berryz Kobo, Country Musume and Cute. In mid-2009, Sugaya became a member of new unit Guardians 4.

On 2 August 2014, it was announced that Berryz Kobo would be going on an indefinite hiatus from 3 March 2015. Further, Sugaya announced she would be taking a break from show business following the cessation of group activities.

She retired from the entertainment industry on March 31, 2023.

== Personal life ==
In October 2017, Sugaya announced her marriage to a man whose identity is undisclosed, and they met through a mutual friend. In addition to this, she was five months pregnant at that time. She gave birth to a girl at 1 March 2018. She had her second child in 2020.

== Discography ==
=== Singles ===
Year	Artist(s)	Title	Release date	Chart position
Year	Artist(s)	Title	Release date	Oricon Weekly Single Chart
2002	Mini Moni with Ai Takahashi + 4Kids	"Genki Jirushi no Ōmori Song / Okashi Tsukutte Okkasi!" (げんき印の大盛りソング/お菓子つくっておっかすぃ〜)	27 November 2002	9
2010	Kitagawa Mimi (CV Ogawa Mana) with MM Gakuen Gasshoubu / Ibu Himuro (CV Sugaya Risako / Berryz Kobo)	"Oshare My Dream / Elegant Girl" (おしゃれ マイドリーム/エレガントガール)	13 October 2010	10

=== DVDs ===
- "Making Of Mini Moni. the Movie: Okashi na Daibōken!" (メイキング・オブ ミニモニ。じゃムービー お菓子な大冒険!) (21 January 2003)
- "Mini Moni. the Movie: Okashi na Daibōken!" (ミニモニ。じゃムービー お菓子な大冒険!) (18 June 2003)
- "Hello! Morning. Mini Moni. Kappa no Kadō" (ハロー!モーニング。ミニモニ。河童の花道) (30 June 2004)
- "Hotaru no Hoshi" (ほたるの星) (22 December 2004)
- "Shōnan Kawara-yane Monogatari" (湘南瓦屋根物語 vol.1 – 3) (7 December 2005)
- "Musume Dokyu! vol.2" (娘DOKYU! vol.2) (14 December 2005)
- "Hello Kids! vol.2" (ハローキッズ! vol.2) (22 February 2006)
- "Hello Pro Hour Vol. 5" (ハロプロアワー Vol.5) (24 January 2007)

==== Solo DVDs ====
No.	Title	Release date	Chart position	Label
No.	Title	Release date	Oricon Weekly Single Chart	Label
1	Sugaya Risako in Hokkaido (菅谷梨沙子 in 北海道)	2 December 2009	64	Piccolo Town
2	Le Soleil	12 February 2011	—	Up-Front Works (e-LineUP!, lim. distribution)

===== Limited edition DVDs =====
- "Go→50 Vol. 2–4" (ゴ→50 Vol.2・4) (13 December 2005, 15 March 2006)
- "Bishōjo Kyōiku II ~Mori no Obenkyō Kaihen~ (美少女教育II 〜森のお勉強会編〜) (14 February 2006)
- "Risako Sugaya DVD on Hello! Project Sports Festival 2006" (1 July 2006)
- "Risako Sugaya on Berryz Kōbō Summer Concert Tour 2006 [Natsu Natsu! ~Anata wo Suki ni Naru Sangekusō] (菅谷梨沙子 on Berryz工房サマーコンサートツアー2006 『夏夏!〜あなたを好きになる三原則〜』) (16 December 2006)
- "Berryz Kōbō DVD Magazine Vol. 8 Risako Sugaya" (Berryz工房 DVD MAGAZINE Vol.8 菅谷梨沙子) (1 April 2007)
- "Risako Sugaya on Berryz Kōbō Concert Tour 2007 Summer ~Welcome! Berryz Kyūden~" (菅谷梨沙子 on Berryz工房コンサートツアー2007夏 〜ウェルカム!Berryz宮殿〜) (26 January 2008)
- "Ura Uta Dokii! Vol.2" (ウラ歌ドキッ! Vol.2) (16 March 2008)
- "Risako Sugaya Shashinshū Ring 3 ~Ring Ring Ringg!~ -Making DVD Special Edition-" (菅谷梨沙子写真集 Ring3〜リンリンリンッ!〜 -Making DVD Special Edition-) (1 April 2008)

=== Radio ===
- "Berryz Kobo Kiritsu! Rei! Chakuseki!" (Berryz工房 起立! 礼! 着席!) (30 March 2005 – 31 March 2009)
- "Tsuukai! Berryz Okoku" (痛快! Berryz王国) (3 July 2009 – 30 March 2012) (Co-hosts: Miyabi Natsuyaki and Yurina Kumai)

=== Photobooks ===
- "1st Solo Photobook 'Risako' (1stソロ写真集「Risako」) (12 October 2006, Wani Books) ISBN 978-4-8470-2964-6
- "2nd Solo Photobook 'pure+' (2ndソロ写真集「pure+」) (20 July 2007, Wani Books) ISBN 978-4-8470-4019-1
- "3rd Solo Photobook 'Ring 3 ~Ring Ring Ringg!~'" (3rdソロ写真集「Ring3〜リンリンリンッ!〜」) (6 February 2008, Kadokawa Group Publishing) ISBN 978-4-04-895013-8
- "4th Solo Photobook 'Risō'" (4thソロ写真集「梨想」) (27 November 2009, Wani Books) ISBN 978-4-8470-4215-7
