= Hello! Project Shuffle Unit =

Japanese idol project group

Hello! Project Shuffle Unit ハロー!プロジェクト シャッフルユニット
- Origin: Tokyo, Japan
- Genres: J-pop
- Years active: 2000-2003; 2005; 2009
- Label: Up-Front Promotion
- Spinoff of: Morning Musume; Coconuts Musume; Taiyō to Ciscomoon; Melon Kinenbi; Country Musume; Berryz Kobo; Cute; Hello Pro Egg
- Past members: See list
- Website: www.helloproject.com

Hello! Project Shuffle Unit (ハロー!プロジェクト シャッフルユニット, Harō! Purojekuto Shaffuru Yunitto) was a Japanese idol project group formed by Up-Front Promotion in 2000 and associated with Hello! Project. Beginning in 2000, the Shuffle Unit project was a yearly collaboration among existing Hello! Project acts, where members were recombined into three different groups to release a single for each.

After a four-year hiatus, the project was briefly revived in 2009, where several old sub-groups saw a return under new names and new members. After 2009, the project became defunct.

== History ==
=== 2000-2005: Initial beginnings ===
Beginning in 2000, Tsunku created a music collaboration project with members of Hello! Project rearranged into three separate teams. The first theme, "color", consisted of Akagumi 4 (あか組4), Kiiro 5 (黄色5), and Aoiro 7 (青色7). All groups released their singles on March 8, 2000, with Akagumi 4's single "Akai Nikkichō" charting the highest at #2 on the Oricon Weekly Singles Charts.

In 2001, the groups were rearranged under the theme "party", with the three groups San-nin Matsuri (三人祭), 7-nin Matsuri (7人祭), and 10-nin Matsuri (10人祭). All groups released their singles on July 4, 2001, with San-nin Matsuri's single "Chu! Natsu Party" charting the highest at #5 on the Oricon Weekly Singles Charts. In 2002, the groups were rearranged under the theme "happiness", with the three groups Happy 7 (ハッピー♥7), Sexy 8 (セクシー8), and Odoru 11 (おどる♥11). All groups released their singles on July 3, 2002, with Sexy 8's single "Shiawase Desu ka?" charting the highest at #2 on the Oricon Weekly Singles Charts.

In 2003, the groups were rearranged under the theme "natural", with the three groups 7 Air, Salt 5, and 11 Water. All groups released their songs as a triple-A-side single on July 9, 2003. The project then took a brief hiatus in 2004, where Tsunku decided to promote all Hello! Project artists as "H.P. All Stars" instead.

Tsunku resumed the Shuffle Unit project in 2005, with groups rearranged under the theme "elegance." The three groups consisted of Sexy Otona Jan (セクシーオトナジャン), Elegies (エレジーズ), and Puri Puri Pink (プリプリピンク), all of whom released their songs as a triple-A-side single on June 22, 2005. Sexy Otona Jan's song "Onna, Kanashii, Otona" was later featured in the 2013 film The Wolverine.

=== 2009: Champloo ===
On July 15, 2009, Tsunku revived the Shuffle Unit project with a cover album titled Champloo: Happy Marriage Song Cover Shū, describing it as J-pop with the intention of it being played during summer parties and weddings. He named the concept of the Shuffle Units "champloo" to describe the "chaotic" member line-up. The project also saw the revival of inactive or disbanded Hello! Project acts under new names with new members, including High-King, Mini-Moni (revived as Shin Mini-Moni (新ミニモニ。)), Tanpopo (revived as Tanpopo Sharp (タンポポ＃; stylized as Tanpopo#)), V-u-den (revived as Zoku V-u-den (続・美勇伝)), Petit Moni (revived as Petit Moni V (プッチモニV), ZYX (revived as ZYX Alpha, stylized as ZYX-α), and Aa! The Shuffle Units also released original songs on the Hello! Project's compilation album, Petit Best 10, and performed as concert-only units.

== Members ==
Member lists are adapted from Hello! Project's website:

Name	Group	Shuffle Units					
Name	Group	Color Units (色ユニット) (2000)	Festival Units (祭ユニット) (2001)	Happiness Units (幸せユニット) (2002)	Natural Units (自然ユニット) (2003)	Elegance Units (優雅ユニット) (2005)	Champloo Units (チャンプルユニット) (2009)
Yuko Nakazawa	Morning Musume	Akagumi 4	N/A			Puri Puri Pink	N/A
Maki Goto	Morning Musume	Akagumi 4	7-nin Matsuri	Sexy 8	N/A		
Miho Shinoda	Taiyō to Ciscomoon	Akagumi 4	N/A				
Danielle	Coconuts Musume	Akagumi 4	N/A				
Natsumi Abe	Morning Musume	Kiiro 5	10-nin Matsuri	Odoru 11	Salt 5	N/A	
Kei Yasuda	Morning Musume	Kiiro 5	10-nin Matsuri	Odoru 11	N/A	Puri Puri Pink	N/A
Ruru	Taiyō to Ciscomoon	Kiiro 5	N/A				
Ayaka	Coconuts Musume	Kiiro 5	7-nin Matsuri	Sexy 8	11 Water	N/A	
Michiyo Heike	—N/a	Kiiro 5	7-nin Matsuri	Sexy 8	N/A		
Kaori Iida	Morning Musume	Aoiro 7	10-nin Matsuri	Odoru 11	11 Water	Puri Puri Pink	N/A
Sayaka Ichii	Morning Musume	Aoiro 7	N/A				
Mari Yaguchi	Morning Musume	Aoiro 7	7-nin Matsuri	Sexy 8	11 Water	N/A	
Atsuko Inaba	Taiyō to Ciscomoon (Note: Atsuko Inaba was part of Taiyo to Ciscomoon until their disbandment.)	Aoiro 7	N/A		7 Air	Puri Puri Pink	N/A
Miwa Kominato	Taiyō to Ciscomoon	Aoiro 7	N/A				
Mika	Coconuts Musume	Aoiro 7	10-nin Matsuri	Happy 7	7 Air	N/A	
Lehua	Coconuts Musume	Aoiro 7	7-nin Matsuri	N/A			
Rika Ishikawa	Morning Musume	—N/a	San-nin Matsuri	Sexy 8	7 Air	N/A	
Ai Kago	Morning Musume	—N/a	San-nin Matsuri	Happy 7	Salt 5	N/A	
Aya Matsuura	—N/a	—N/a	San-nin Matsuri	Odoru 11	Salt 5	N/A	
Asami Kimura	Country Musume	—N/a	7-nin Matsuri	Happy 7	11 Water	N/A	
Ayumi Shibata	Melon Kinenbi	—N/a	7-nin Matsuri	Odoru 11	11 Water	Elegies	N/A
Hitomi Yoshizawa	Morning Musume	—N/a	10-nin Matsuri	Sexy 8	11 Water	N/A	
Nozomi Tsuji	Morning Musume	—N/a	10-nin Matsuri	Odoru 11	11 Water	N/A	
Megumi Murata	Melon Kinenbi	—N/a	10-nin Matsuri	Odoru 11	11 Water	N/A	
Masae Otani	Melon Kinenbi	—N/a	10-nin Matsuri	Sexy 8	7 Air	N/A	
Hitomi Saito	Melon Kinenbi	—N/a	10-nin Matsuri	Happy 7	11 Water	N/A	
Rinne	Country Musume	—N/a	10-nin Matsuri	Odoru 11	N/A		
Makoto Ogawa	Morning Musume	N/A		Happy 7	Salt 5	N/A	
Ai Takahashi	Morning Musume	N/A		Happy 7	7 Air	Elegies	High-King
Risa Niigaki	Morning Musume	N/A		Happy 7	7 Air	N/A	ZYX-α
Mai Satoda	Country Musume	N/A		Sexy 8	7 Air	Elegies	N/A
Asami Konno	Morning Musume	N/A		Odoru 11	11 Water	N/A	
Rika Ishii	—N/a	N/A		Odoru 11	N/A		
Miki Fujimoto	Morning Musume (Note: Miki Fujimoto was a soloist before joining Morning Musume in 2003.)	N/A		Odoru 11	11 Water	Sexy Otona Jan	N/A
Yuki Maeda	—N/a	N/A			Salt 5	N/A	
Miyabi Natsuyaki	Berryz Kobo	N/A				Sexy Otona Jan	Aa!
Megumi Murakami	Cute	N/A				Sexy Otona Jan	N/A
Reina Tanaka	Morning Musume	N/A				Elegies	High-King
Saki Shimizu	Berryz Kobo	N/A					High-King
Maimi Yajima	Cute	N/A					High-King
Yuuka Maeda	Smileage	N/A					High-King
Airi Suzuki	Cute	N/A					Aa!
Lin Lin	Morning Musume	N/A					Shin Mini-Moni
Kanon Fukuda	Smileage	N/A					Shin Mini-Moni
Akari Takeuchi	Hello Pro Egg	N/A					Shin Mini-Moni
Karin Miyamoto	Hello Pro Egg	N/A					Shin Mini-Moni
Saki Nakajima	Cute	N/A					Petit Moni V
Mai Hagiwara	Cute	N/A					Petit Moni V
Erina Mano	—N/a	N/A					Petit Moni V
Koharu Kusumi	Morning Musume	N/A					ZYX-Alpha
Momoko Tsugunaga	Berryz Kobo	N/A					ZYX-Alpha
Chinami Tokunaga	Berryz Kobo	N/A					ZYX-Alpha
Maasa Sudo	Berryz Kobo	N/A					ZYX-Alpha
Erika Umeda	Cute	N/A					ZYX-Alpha
Ayaka Wada	Smileage	N/A					ZYX-Alpha
Saki Ogawa	Smileage	N/A					ZYX-Alpha
Sayumi Michishige	Morning Musume	N/A					Zoku V-u-den
Jun Jun	Morning Musume	N/A					Zoku V-u-den
Risako Sugaya	Berryz Kobo	N/A					Zoku V-u-den
Eri Kamei	Morning Musume	N/A					Tanpopo Sharp
Aika Mitsui	Morning Musume	N/A					Tanpopo Sharp
Yurina Kumai	Berryz Kobo	N/A					Tanpopo Sharp
Chisato Okai	Cute	N/A					Tanpopo Sharp

== Discography ==
=== Albums ===
Title	Year	Album details	Peak chart positions		Sales
Title	Year	Album details	JPN	JPN Hot	Sales
Champloo 1: Happy Marriage Song Cover Shū (チャンプル1～ハッピーマリッジソングカバー集～)	2009	Released: July 15, 2009; Label: Zetima; Formats: CD, digital download; Track listing: 1. "Diamonds" (High-King); 2. "Ai wa Katsu" (愛は勝つ) (Cute & Erina Mano); 3. "Yes-Yes-Yes" (Aa!); 4. "Tentōmushi no Samba" (てんとう虫のサンバ) (Shin Mini-Moni); 5. "Kimi ga Iru Dake de" (君がいるだけで) (Petit Moni V); 6. "Heya to Y Shirt to Watashi" (部屋とYシャツと私) (Reina Tanaka from Morning Musume); 7. "Mamotte Agetai" (守ってあげたい) (Risa Niigaki & Eri Kamei from Morning Musume); 8. "Akizakura" (秋桜) (Ai Takahashi from Morning Musume); 9. "Mirai Yosōzu II" (未来予想図II) (ZYX-α); 10. "Only You" Zoku V-u-den); 11. "Akai Sweet Pea" (赤いスイートピー) Tanpopo#); 12. "For You..." (Lin Lin from Morning Musume); 13. "Kanpaku Sengen" (関白宣言) (Berryz Kobo & Erina Mano); 14. "Sekai wa Futari no Tame ni" (世界は二人のために) (Sayumi Michishige, Koharu Kusumi, Aika Mitsui, & Jun Jun from Morning Musume)	37	—	—
"—" denotes releases that did not chart or were not released in that region.

=== Singles ===
Title	Year	Peak chart positions	Sales	Album
Title	Year	JPN	Sales	Album
"Akai Nikkichō" (赤い日記帳) (Akagumi 4)	2000	2	—	Petit Best: Ki-Ao-Aka
"Kiiroi Osora de Boom Boom Boom" (黄色いお空でBOOM BOOM BOOM) (Kiiro 5)	2000	3	—	Petit Best: Ki-Ao-Aka
"Aoi Sports Car no Otoko" (青いスポーツカーの男) (Aoiro 7)	2000	4	—	Petit Best: Ki-Ao-Aka
"Chu! Natsu Party" (チュッ!夏パ～ティ) (San-nin Matsuri)	2001	5	—	Petit Best 2: San-Nana-Jū
"Summer Reggae! Rainbow" (サマーれげぇ!レインボー) (7-nin Matsuri)	2001	6	—	Petit Best 2: San-Nana-Jū
"Dancing! Natsu Matsuri" (ダンシング!夏祭り) (10-nin Matsuri)	2001	7	—	Petit Best 2: San-Nana-Jū
"Shiawase Beam! Suki Suki Beam!" (幸せビーム!好き好きビーム!) (Happy 7)	2002	3	—	Petit Best 3
"Shiawase Desu ka?" (幸せですか?) (Sexy 8)	2002	2	—	Petit Best 3
"Shiawase Kyōryū Ondo" (幸せきょうりゅう音頭) (Odoru 11)	2002	4	—	Petit Best 3
"Kowarenai Ai ga Hoshii no" (壊れない愛がほしいの) / "Get Up! Rapper" (GET UP!ラッパー) / "Be All Right!" (7 Air, Salt 5, & 11 Water)	2003	2	—	Petit Best 4
"Onna, Kanashii, Otona" (オンナ、哀しい、オトナ) / "Inshō-ha Renoir no You ni" (印象派 ルノアールのように) / "Hitoshirezu Mune o Kanaderu Yoru no Aki" (人知れず 胸を奏でる 夜の秋) (Sexy Otona Jan, Elegies, Puri Puri Pink)	2005	6	—	Petit Best 5
"—" denotes releases that did not chart or were not released in that region.

==== Video singles ====
Title	Year	Peak chart positions	Sales	Album
Title	Year	JPN	Sales	Album
"The Ki-Ao-Aka" (ザ・黄青あか)	2000	—N/a	—	Petit Best DVD
"The San-7-10-nin Matsuri" (ザ・三・7・10人祭)	2001	—N/a	—	Petit Best 2 DVD
Single V: "Shiawase Beam! Suki Suki Beam" / "Shiawase Desu ka?" / "Shiawase Kyōryū Ondo" (シングルV「幸せビーム!好き好きビーム!」「幸せですか?」「幸せきょうりゅう音頭」)	2002	—N/a	—	—N/a
Single V: "Kowarenai Ai ga Hoshii no" / "Get Up! Rapper" / "Be All Right!" (シングルV「壊れない愛がほしいの・GET UP!ラッパー・BE ALL RIGHT!」)	2003	—N/a	—	—N/a
Single V: "Onna, Kanashii, Onna" / "Inshō-ha Renoir no You ni" / "Hitoshirezu Mune o Kanaderu Yoru no Aki" (シングルV「オンナ、哀しい、オトナ/印象派 ルノアールのように/人知れず 胸を奏でる 夜の秋」)	2005	13	—	—N/a
"—" denotes releases that did not chart or were not released in that region.
