= Tokaikko Junjō =

- Regular Edition cover

Single by Cute

from the album 3rd: Love Escalation!
- Released: October 17, 2007 (JP)
- Recorded: 2007
- Genre: J-pop; electropop; dance-pop
- Length: 13:41
- Label: Zetima
- Songwriter: Tsunku
- Producer: Tsunku

Cute singles chronology
"Meguru Koi no Kisetsu" (2007)	"Tokaikko Junjō" (2007)	"Lalala Shiawase no Uta" (2008)

Music video
- "Tokaikko Junjō" on YouTube

"Tokaikko Junjō" (都会っ子 純情; City-bred Girl's Innocence) is the third major single from the Japanese pop group Cute, released on October 17, 2007 on the Zetima label.

The CD single was released in two versions: Regular Edition and Limited Edition, the latter included a bonus DVD with a concert performance. It debuted at number 3 in the Oricon Weekly Singles Chart, remaining in the chart for 4 weeks.

On October 31, the Single V containing the "Tokaikko Junjō" music video appeared.

As of November 28, 2007, the single has sold 38,085 copies.

On December 30, 2007, for the single "Tokaikko Junjō" C-ute received the Japan Record Award for Best New Artist.

== Description ==
The selected lead singer for Tokaikko Junjō is Airi Suzuki. The Minor Vocals for Tokaikko Junjō are Mai Hagiwara and Saki Nakajima, they get 3 and 2 solo lines. Maimi Yajima also gets a solo line and 2 paragraphs of soliloquy. Its dance performance designated Airi Suzuki, Mai Hagiwara and Saki Nakajima as choreographical centre, but in the middle of the song, Airi Suzuki and Maimi Yajima are the center positions.

== Track listing ==
All tracks are written by Tsunku.

No.	Title	Length
1.	"Tokaikko Junjō" (都会っ子 純情, "City-bred Girl's Innocence")
2.	"Shiritsu Kyōgaku" (私立共学, "Private Coed School")
3.	"Tokaikko Junjō (Instrumental)" (都会っ子 純情（Instrumental）)

== Charts ==
Chart (2007)	Peak position	Weeks on chart
Oricon Weekly Singles Chart	3	4

== Awards ==
=== Japan Record Awards ===
The Japan Record Awards is a major music awards show held annually in Japan by the Japan Composer's Association.

Year	Nominee / work	Award	Result
2007	Cute "Tokaikko Junjō"	New Artist	Won
2007	Cute "Tokaikko Junjō"	Best New Artist	Won

See also

- 49th Japan Record Awards
