= All for One & One for All! =

EP by H.P. All Stars
- Released: December 1, 2004
- Recorded: 2004
- Genre: J-pop
- Length: 19:53
- Label: Zetima
- Producer: Tsunku

All for One & One for All! is the first (and only) mini album by Hello! Project unit H.P. All Stars, released on December 1, 2004, in both a normal and limited edition, the limited edition having a different cover. It reached a peak of #5 on the daily Oricon charts, lasting 7 weeks. The concept behind the song was to show the fans appreciation and celebrate Hello! Project's seventh anniversary, whilst sending a message of peace.

The title track features every member of Hello! Project at the time of release; however, the coupling tracks were sung only by a few specially selected singers. On the normal edition cover, the members are arranged in the shape of the letter "H" on the front cover, and the letter "P" on the back cover, representing the Hello! Project initials. The first pressing came with a 100-page photobook.

== Track listing ==
1. "All for One & One for All!" – 05:46
2. "Sankaku Kankei" (三角関係; "Love Triangle") – 05:25
  - Performed by Atsuko Inaba, Masae Ohtani, Ayumi Shibata and Aya Matsuura.
3. "Suki ni Naccha Ikenai Hito" (好きになっちゃいけない人; "The Person I Shouldn't Love") – 03:59
  - Performed by Reina Tanaka, Megumi Murakami and Airi Suzuki.
4. "All for One & One for All!" (Instrumental) – 05:43

== Featured members ==
Morning Musume

- Kaori Iida, Mari Yaguchi, Hitomi Yoshizawa, Rika Ishikawa, Ai Takahashi, Asami Konno, Makoto Ogawa, Risa Niigaki, Miki Fujimoto, Eri Kamei, Sayumi Michishige & Reina Tanaka

W

- Nozomi Tsuji & Ai Kago

Country Musume

- Asami Kimura, Mai Satoda & Miuna Saito

Melon Kinenbi

- Hitomi Saito, Megumi Murata, Masae Ohtani & Ayumi Shibata

v-u-den

- Rika Ishikawa, Erika Miyoshi & Yui Okada

Berryz Kobo

- Saki Shimizu, Momoko Tsugunaga, Chinami Tokunaga, Maasa Sudo, Miyabi Natsuyaki, Maiha Ishimura, Yurina Kumai & Risako Sugaya

Hello! Project Kids (later known as Cute)

- Erika Umeda, Maimi Yajima, Megumi Murakami, Saki Nakajima, Airi Suzuki, Chisato Okai & Mai Hagiwara

Soloists

- Yuko Nakazawa, Natsumi Abe, Kei Yasuda, Maki Goto, Atsuko Inaba, Ayaka Kimura, Yuki Maeda & Aya Matsuura

== Personnel ==
Track 1

- Lyrics & composition – Tsunku
- Arrangement – Hideyuki "Daichi" Suzuki

Track 2

- Lyrics & composition – Tsunku
- Arrangement – Yuichi Takahashi

Track 3

- Lyrics & composition – Tsunku
- Arrangement – Shōichirō Hirata
