= Hello! Project discography =

- Studio albums: 1
- Compilation albums: 19
- Singles: 2

This is the discography for Hello! Project.

== Albums ==
=== Studio albums ===
List of studio albums, with selected chart positions, sales figures and certifications
Title	Year	Album details	Peak chart positions		Sales
Title	Year	Album details	JPN		Sales
Title	Year	Album details	Oricon	Billboard Japan	Sales
Chanpuru 1: Happy Marriage Song Cover Shu (チャンプル1～ハッピーマリッジソングカバー集～)	2009	Released: July 15, 2009; Label: Zetima; Formats: CD	37	—	—
"—" denotes releases that did not chart or were not released in that region.

=== Compilation albums ===
List of compilation albums, with selected chart positions, sales figures and certifications
Title	Year	Album details	Peak chart positions		Sales
Title	Year	Album details	JPN		Sales
Title	Year	Album details	Oricon	Billboard Japan	Sales
Petit Best: Ki-Ao-Aka (プッチベスト～黄青あか～)	2000	Released: April 26, 2000; Label: Zetima; Formats: CD	—	—	—
Petit Best 2: San-Nana-Jū (プッチベスト2～三・7・10～)	2001	Released: December 19, 2001; Label: Zetima; Formats: CD	—	—	—
Petit Best 3 (プッチベスト3)	2002	Released: December 18, 2002; Label: Zetima; Formats: CD	—	—	—
Petit Best 4 (プッチベスト4)	2003	Released: December 17, 2003; Label: Zetima; Formats: CD	—	—	—
Petit Best 5 (プッチベスト5)	2004	Released: December 22, 2004; Label: Zetima; Formats: CD	—	—	—
Petit Best 6 (プッチベスト6)	2005	Released: December 21, 2005; Label: Zetima; Formats: CD	22	—	—
Petit Best 7 (プッチベスト7)	2006	Released: December 20, 2006; Label: Zetima; Formats: CD	32	—	—
Petit Best 8 (プッチベスト8)	2007	Released: December 12, 2007; Label: Zetima; Formats: CD	45	—	—
Petit Best 9 (プッチベスト9)	2008	Released: December 10, 2008; Label: Zetima; Formats: CD	66	—	—
Hello! Project Special Unit Mega Best (ハロー!プロジェクト スペシャルユニット メガベスト)	2008	Released: December 10, 2008; Label: Zetima; Formats: CD	132	—	—
Petit Best 10 (プッチベスト10)	2009	Released: December 2, 2009; Label: Zetima; Formats: CD	45	—	—
Petit Best 11 (プッチベスト11)	2010	Released: December 15, 2010; Label: Zetima; Formats: CD	98	—	—
Petit Best 12 (プッチベスト12)	2011	Released: December 7, 2011; Label: Zetima; Formats: CD	82	—	—
Petit Best 13 (プッチベスト13)	2012	Released: December 5, 2012; Label: Zetima; Formats: CD	96	—	—
Petit Best 14 (プッチベスト14)	2013	Released: December 11, 2013; Label: Zetima; Formats: CD	90	—	—
Petit Best 15 (プッチベスト15)	2014	Released: December 10, 2014; Label: Zetima; Formats: CD	111	—	—
Petit Best 16 (プッチベスト16)	2015	Released: December 16, 2015; Label: Zetima; Formats: CD	135	—	—
Petit Best 17 (プッチベスト17)	2016	Released: December 14, 2016; Label: Zetima; Formats: CD	77	—	—
Petit Best 18 (プッチベスト18)	2017	Released: December 13, 2017; Label: Zetima; Formats: CD	99	—	—
Petit Best 19 (プッチベスト19)	2018	Released: December 12, 2018; Label: Zetima; Formats: CD	100	—	—
"—" denotes releases that did not chart or were not released in that region.

=== Drama CD albums ===
List of studio albums, with selected chart positions, sales figures and certifications
Title	Year	Album details	Peak chart positions		Sales
Title	Year	Album details	JPN		Sales
Title	Year	Album details	Oricon	Billboard Japan	Sales
Hello! Project Radio Drama Vol. 1	2003	Released: October 29, 2003; Label: Zetima; Formats: CD	—	—	—
Hello! Project Radio Drama Vol. 2	2003	Released: October 29, 2003; Label: Zetima; Formats: CD	—	—	—
Hello! Project Radio Drama Vol. 3	2004	Released: March 31, 2004; Label: Zetima; Formats: CD	—	—	—
Hello! Project Radio Drama Vol. 4	2004	Released: June 9, 2004; Label: Zetima; Formats: CD	—	—	—
Hello! Project Radio Drama Osaka Version Vol. 1	2004	Released: July 14, 2004; Label: Zetima; Formats: CD	—	—	—
Hello! Project Radio Drama Osaka Version Vol. 2	2004	Released: July 14, 2004; Label: Zetima; Formats: CD	—	—	—
Hello! Project Radio Drama Osaka Version Vol. 3	2006	Released: July 26, 2006; Label: Zetima; Formats: CD	175	—	—
Hello! Project Radio Drama Osaka Version Vol. 4	2006	Released: July 26, 2006; Label: Zetima; Formats: CD	174	—	—
"—" denotes releases that did not chart or were not released in that region.

== Singles ==
=== As lead artist ===
Title	Year	Peak chart positions		Sales	Album
Title	Year	JPN		Sales	Album
Title	Year	Oricon	Hot 100	Sales	Album
As H.P. All Stars
"All for One & One for All!"	2004	5	—	—	Petit Best 5
As Hello! Project Mobekimasu
"Busu ni Naranai Tetsugaku" (ブスにならない哲学)	2011	4	5	—	Petit Best 12
"—" denotes releases that did not chart or were not released in that region.

=== As featured artist ===
Title	Year	Peak chart positions		Sales	Album
Title	Year	JPN		Sales	Album
Title	Year	Oricon	Hot 100	Sales	Album
"Ai no Merry Christmas" (愛のメリークリスマス) (feat. Itsuki, Takao, and Hello! Project Seikatai)	2002	—	—	—	Non-album single
"—" denotes releases that did not chart or were not released in that region.
