= 3rd: Love Escalation! =

3rd: Love Escalation

Studio album by Cute
- Released: 12 March 2008 (JP)
- Genre: J-pop
- Label: Zetima
- Producer: Tsunku

Cute chronology
2 Mini: Ikiru to Iu Chikara (2007)	3rd: Love Escalation (2008)	4 Akogare My Star (2009)

Singles from 3rd: Love Escalation
- 1. "Sakura Chirari" Released: 21 February 2007; 2. "Meguru Koi no Kisetsu" Released: 11 July 2007; 3. "Tokaikko Junjō" Released: 17 October 2007; 4. "Lalala Shiawase no Uta" Released: 27 February 2008

3rd ~Love Escalation!~ (3rd～LOVEエスカレーション!～, Sādo ~Rabu Esukarēshon~) is the third album from the Japanese girl idol group Cute. It was released in regular and limited editions on 12 March 2008 on the Zetima Records label. The regular has catalogue number EPCE-5547 and the limited edition, which includes a bonus DVD, has catalogue number EPCE-5545~46.

The album debuted at number 10 in the Oricon Weekly Albums Chart, staying in the chart for 4 weeks.

As of 2011, it still remains C-ute's best selling album.

== Track listing ==
All songs written and composed by Tsunku.

=== CD ===
1. "Tokaikko Junjō" (都会っ子 純情)
2. "Image Colour" (イメージカラー)
  - Performed by Maimi Yajima and Airi Suzuki
3. "Otome Cocoro" (乙女Cocoro)
4. "Lalala Shiawase no Uta" (LALALA 幸せの歌)
5. "Homerare Nobiko no Theme Kyoku" (ほめられ伸び子のテーマ曲)
6. "Meguru Koi no Kisetsu" (めぐる恋の季節)
7. "Sweeeets→→→Live" (スイーーツ→→→ライブ)
  - Performed by Chisato Okai and Kanna Arihara
8. "Sakura Chirari" (桜チラリ)
9. "Hare no Platinum Dōri" (晴れのプラチナ通り)
  - Performed by Saki Nakajima and Mai Hagiwara
10. "Do Don Ga Don Ondo" (ドドンガドン音頭)
  - Performed by Erika Umeda with °C-ute Gasshōdan

=== DVD ===
1. LaLaLa Shiawase no Uta (Hello! Project 2008 Winter ~Kettei! Hello☆Pro Award '08~ live version)
2. LaLaLa Shiawase no Uta (Erika Umeda close-up version)
3. LaLaLa Shiawase no Uta (Maimi Yajima close-up version)
4. LaLaLa Shiawase no Uta (Saki Nakajima close-up version)
5. LaLaLa Shiawase no Uta (Airi Suzuki close-up version)
6. LaLaLa Shiawase no Uta (Chisato Okai close-up version)
7. LaLaLa Shiawase no Uta (Mai Hagiwara close-up version)
8. LaLaLa Shiawase no Uta (Kanna Arihara close-up version)

== Charts ==
Chart (2008)	Peak position	Weeks on chart	Sales	
Chart (2008)	Peak position	Weeks on chart	First week	Total
Japan (Oricon Daily Albums Chart)	5			
Japan (Oricon Weekly Albums Chart)	10	4	13,780	17,099
