= Megumi Murakami =

- 村上 愛
- Born: June 6, 1992 (age 34); Saitama Prefecture, Japan
- Other names: Meg, Meguru
- Occupations: Singer; actress
- Agent: Up-Front Promotion (2002–2006)
- Musical career
- Genre: J-pop
- Years active: 2002–2006
- Label: Zetima
- Formerly of: Cute; ZYX; Hello! Project Kids

Megumi Murakami (村上 愛, Murakami Megumi; born June 6, 1992, in Saitama Prefecture) is a Japanese former singer and actress. She first gained recognition when she joined Hello! Project Kids and later became the lead vocalist of the girl group Cute. On November 1, 2006, Murakami left Cute and retired from the entertainment industry.

== Career ==
=== 2002–2005: Hello! Project Kids and ZYX ===
In 2002, Murakami auditioned for Hello! Project Kids with the song "Pittari Shitai X'mas!" by Petitmoni. Her audition tape was aired on Morning Musume's variety show Hello! Morning. She was placed in the group with 14 other girls. She made her first appearance in the 2002 film Koinu Dan no Monogatari.

In 2003, Murakami became a member of the subgroup ZYX along with Mari Yaguchi from Morning Musume, Erika Umeda, Maimi Yajima, Saki Shimizu, and Momoko Tsugunaga. They released their debut single, "Iku ZYX! Fly High" on August 6, 2003, followed by "Shiroi Tokyo" on December 10, 2003.

During the summer of 2004, Murakami appeared in the music video for "Yokohama Shinkirou" by Maki Goto. Later that year, she participated in singing "All for One & One for All!", a collaboration single released by all Hello! Project artists under the name "H.P. All Stars." Murakami sang the coupling track, "Suki ni Naccha Ikenai Hito", with Reina Tanaka and Airi Suzuki.

=== 2005–2006: Cute ===
In 2004, Berryz Kobo was created with the intention of rotating all of the members of Hello! Project Kids to make time for school, but the idea was later scrapped, and the remaining girls who were not chosen were rebranded under the name Cute on June 11, 2005. Murakami became one of the lead vocals on all of the group's indies singles.

Murakami was grouped with Miki Fujimoto from Morning Musume and Miyabi Natsuyaki from Berryz Kobo for the shuffle unit Sexy Otonajan. They released the song "Onna, Kanashii, Otona" on June 22, 2005.

On November 1, 2006, shortly before Cute made their major label debut, Murakami left the group to concentrate on her studies. Following Cute's disbandment in 2017, she attended their final concert.

=== Choreography work ===
Murakami arranged the choreography for Musumen's 8th single, "Shinsen! Ryūgūjō RENBO."

== Filmography ==
=== Film ===
Year	Title	Role	Notes
2002	Koinu Dan no Monogatari	Hitomi Ayada	Supporting role

=== Television ===
Year	Title	Role	Network	Notes
2002–2006	Hello! Morning	Herself	TV Tokyo	Morning Musume's variety show
2002–2004	Hello Kids	Herself	TV Tokyo	Minimoni's variety show
2003	Little Hospital	Aiko Murata	TV Tokyo	Lead role
2005	Musume Document 2005	Herself	TV Tokyo	Morning Musume's variety show
2005–2006	Musume Dokyu!	Herself	TV Tokyo	Morning Musume's variety show
2005	Takaramono	Chihiro Takeda (young)	GyaO	

=== Music video ===
Year	Artist	Song	Notes
2004	Maki Goto	"Yokohama Shinkirou"	

=== Theater ===
Year	Title	Role	Notes
2004	Here's Love	Susan Walker	Double-cast with Airi Suzuki
