= Lalala Shiawase no Uta =

"La La La Shiawase no Uta"
- Regular Edition cover

Single by Cute

from the album 3rd: Love Escalation!
- Released: February 27, 2008 (JP)
- Recorded: 2008
- Genre: J-pop
- Length: 13 minutes (CD); 21 minutes (DVD)
- Label: Zetima
- Songwriter: Tsunku
- Producer: Tsunku

Cute singles chronology
"Tokaikko Junjō" (2007)	"La La La Shiawase no Uta" (2008)	"Namida no Iro" (2008)

Music video
- "La La La Shiawase no Uta" on YouTube

"La La La Shiawase no Uta" (LALALA 幸せの歌; "La La La Song of Happiness") is the fourth major single release from J-pop group Cute. It was released on February 27, 2008, debuting at number 6 in the Oricon Weekly Singles Chart. The single was also released as a special limited edition, featuring an additional disc containing the "Dance Shot Ver." of the music video.

== Background ==
A new single was scheduled to be released on January 30, 2008, but was postponed and released on February 27. The Single V was also postponed, its release been moved from February 14 to March 5.

== Track listing ==
All tracks are written by Tsunku.

No.	Title	Length
1.	"La La La Shiawase no Uta" (LALALA 幸せの歌, "La La La Happy Song")
2.	"Saikōkyū no Enjoy Girls" (最高級のエンジョイGIRLS, "Enjoy the Finest, Girls")
3.	"La La La Shiawase no Uta (Instrumental)" (LALALA 幸せの歌（Instrumental）)

Limited Edition DVD
No.	Title	{{{extra_column}}}	Length
1.	"La La La Shiawase no Uta" (LALALA 幸せの歌)
2.	"La La La Shiawase no Uta (Close-up Ver.)" (LALALA 幸せの歌 (Close-up Ver.))
3.	"Making Eizō" (メイキング映像, "Making Of")	Maimi Yajima (Cute)

== Charts ==
Chart (2008)	Peak position
Oricon Weekly Singles Chart	6
Billboard Japan Hot 100	18
Billboard Japan Hot Top Airplay	51
Billboard Japan Hot Singles Sales	12
