= C\C (Cinderella\Complex) =

- Limited edition cover.

Single by High-King
- Released: June 11, 2008
- Recorded: 2008
- Genre: J-pop
- Length: 12:38
- Label: Zetima
- Songwriter(s): Tsunku, Akira
- Producer(s): Tsunku

"C\C (Cinderella\Complex)" (C\C (シンデレラ\コンプレックス), Shinderera\Konpurekkusu) is the debut (and to date only) single by Hello! Project group High-King. It was released on June 11, 2008 on the Zetima label in two editions - a normal edition (EPCE-5561), containing only the normal CD, and a limited edition (EPCE-5559 - 60), containing a bonus DVD with an alternate version of the PV on it. The limited edition and first press of the normal edition also included a bonus serial number card, used in a promotional draw. The single peaked at #6 on the weekly Oricon chart, charting for five weeks, selling 26,805 copies in its first week. The song, like the unit itself, was created specially for Morning Musume's second collaboration with the Takarazuka Revue, Cinderella The Musical, for which it served as the theme song. The Single V (EPBE-5294) was released on June 25, 2008.

The PV for the single was released on Dohhh Up!, a video streaming site, a week prior to the single's release. Due to guidelines drawn up by NHK and the NAB to reduce negative health effects (including photosensitive seizures) from animation and other video, the cut initially shown on the site has been replaced with a re-edited version. The video on the single V is the re-edited cut.

== Track listings ==
=== CD ===
No.	Title	Lyrics	Music	Length
1.	"C\C (Cinderella\Complex)" (C\C（シンデレラ\コンプレックス）)	Tsunku	Tsunku, Akira	03:52
2.	"Kioku no Meiro" (記憶の迷路, "Maze of Memories")	Tsunku	Tsunku, Kōtarō Egami	04:54
3.	"C\C (Cinderella\Complex) (Instrumental)"			03:52
Total length:				12:38

=== Limited edition DVD ===
No.	Title	Length
1.	"C\C (Cinderella\Complex) -Dance Shot Ver.-"

=== Single V ===
No.	Title	Length
1.	"C\C (Cinderella\Complex)" (C\C（シンデレラ\コンプレックス）)
2.	"C\C (Cinderella\Complex) (Close Up Ver.)"
3.	"Making Of" (メイキング映像, "Making Eizō")
