= Koinu Dan no Monogatari =

2002 Japanese film

- DVD cover
- Kanji: 仔犬ダンの物語
- Directed by: Shinichiro Sawai
- Written by: Takoe Higashi
- Produced by: Naoki Yamazaki
- Starring: Hello! Project Kids; Morning Musume; Maki Goto
- Cinematography: Nobuyasu Kita
- Edited by: Shinya Tadano
- Music by: Eiji Kawamura
- Distributed by: Toei Company
- Release date: December 14, 2002 (Japan)
- Running time: 70 minutes
- Country: Japan
- Language: Japanese
- Box office: ¥650 million

Koinu Dan no Monogatari (Japanese: 仔犬ダンの物語; lit. "The Story of Dan the Puppy"), is a 2002 Japanese film directed by Shinichiro Sawai, starring Hello! Project Kids, Morning Musume, and Maki Goto. The film was given a limited screening on December 14, 2002, where it was screened as a double-feature with Mini-Moni the Movie: Okashi na Daibōken!, a film starring the rest of the Hello! Project members who did not appear in Koinu Dan no Monogatari.

== Plot ==
Angry at her parents' decision to divorce, Mao Morishita decides to live with her grandfather in the countryside of Gunma Prefecture. Upon settling in her new school, she is bullied by Rena and her friends, while her aunt and uncle find her a burden. Meanwhile, Mao's classmate, Chika Nomura, finds an abandoned Shiba Inu puppy in the river. However, because her apartment complex does not allow its tenants to keep pets, she decides to take care of him in secret and names him Dan. One day, Mao catches Chika shoplifting a carton of milk for Dan, but she offers to pay for it. While feeding Dan, Mao and Chika learn that Dan is blind and cannot survive on his own.

Yayoi, a convenience store worker, finds Chika taking care of Dan and warns her to be careful about getting caught by Tsuneo, her father and the leader of the neighborhood council. Mao and Chika leave Dan at a temple for its god to decide his owner, but Chika decides to go back for him. The girls continue to take care of Dan until he is discovered by Tsuneo. Tsuneo gives Chika one day to find a new owner, otherwise Dan will be euthanized. With Yayoi and Ms. Nishida's help, Saki Ōkubo's uncle offers to take him in. However, Chika has grown so fond of Dan that she walks to Tochigi Prefecture by herself just to visit him, and when Mao realizes the two are inseparable, she convinces Saki's uncle to let them take him back. After apologizing to Saki, Mao vows that she will try to convince Tsuneo herself.

Mao and Yayoi persuade Tsuneo to let them keep Dan at the apartment complex, and he finally relents, adopting him. With help from their friends, Mao, Chika, and Tsuneo begin building a doghouse for Dan at a nearby park, but unfortunately, they are met with protest from the elderly tenants from the apartment complex, who object to keeping Dan. Mao stands up to the group's leader, stating that they should be able to help Dan much like how other dogs help blind humans. With support from the other neighbors, the tenants relent and help build Dan's doghouse.

Several days later, Mao is now friends with the girls at her school, including Rena. After school, Wakako comes to visit and tells Mao that the divorce has been finalized. However, Mao tells her that she has decided to live with her father in Toyama Prefecture after reading his letter, and the two promise each other that they will always be family despite living apart. Mao pays a final visit to Chika and Dan, bidding them farewell. When she and her father leave on the bus as they move out, Mao sees all of the friends she made in Gunma Prefecture sending her off, and she says goodbye to them.

== Cast ==
- Momoko Tsugunaga as Mao Morishita (森下真生), a transfer student from Tokyo
- Saki Shimizu as Chika Nomura (野村千香), a student from Mao's school who finds Dan
- Natsumi Abe as Yayoi Kosawa (古澤弥生), a convenience store employee and Tsuneo's daughter
- Akira Emoto as Tsuneo Kosawa (古澤常男), the leader of the neighborhood council
- Kei Yasuda as Kaori Nishida (西田香), a teacher at Mina and Kengo's kindergarten
- Mieko Harada as Wakako Morishita (森下和歌子), Mao's mother
- Takaaki Enoki as Yoshitaka Morishita (森下祥隆), Mao's father
- Rika Ishikawa as Tomomi Morishita (森下知美), Mao's cousin
- Keiko Saito as Aki Nomura (野村亜紀), Chika's mother
- Kaori Iida as Saki Ohkubo (大久保佐紀), the coach of the girls' soccer team
- Hitomi Yoshizawa as Rika Kudo (森下知美), the coach of the girls' soccer team
- Maimi Yajima as Rena Tsujimoto (辻本玲奈), a classmate who bullies Mao, but secretly likes dogs
- Erika Umeda as Madoka Nishizawa (西沢まどか), a member of Rena's clique
- Chinami Tokunaga as Kana Saito (斉藤佳奈), a member of Rena's clique
- Miyabi Natsuyaki as Yui Nakata (中田亜依), a member of Rena's clique
- Chisato Okai as Mina Nomura (野村美奈), Chika's younger sister
- Megumi Murakami as Hitomi Ayata (綾田 瞳), Mao's classmate and a member of the soccer team
- Makoto Ogawa as Yuka Miyashita (宮下由香), a member of the soccer team
- Risa Niigaki as Mako Kawaguchi (川口麻子), a member of the soccer team
- Maki Goto as Honami Natsume (夏目保奈美), a high school student working at Wakako's company
- Asami Konno as Kanae Matsushita (松下かなえ), a girl from Tochigi Prefecture who helps Mao when she gets lost
- Saki Nakajima as Chiyori Hoshino (星野ちより), a girl living in Chika's apartment complex and Mina's friend
- Maiha Ishimura as Yukari Hara (原由香里), a girl who helps build Dan's doghouse
- Yurina Kumai as Hikaru Matsuda (松田ひかる), a girl who helps build Dan's doghouse

== Soundtrack ==
Koinu Dan no Monogatari: Original Soundtrack

Soundtrack album by various artists
- Released: February 14, 2003
- Genre: J-pop
- Label: Zetima

Koinu Dan no Monogatari: Original Soundtrack (仔犬ダンの物語 オリジナルサウンドトラック, Koinu Dan no Monogatari: Orijinaru Saundotorakku) was released February 14, 2003 under the Zetima label. The film's theme song, "Ganbacchae!", was performed by Morning Musume, Hello! Project Kids, and Maki Goto. It was released separately as a DVD single on January 29, 2003, as a double A-side with "Hey! Mirai" by Morning Musume.

No.	Title	Lyrics	Music	Arrangement	Length
1.	"Ganbacchae!がんばっちゃえ! (Let's Go For It!)" (Performed by Morning Musume, Hello! Project Kids, and Maki Goto)	Tsunku	Tsunku	Tatoo
2.	"Hey! Mirai (HEY! 未来; Hey! Future)" (Performed by Morning Musume)	Tsunku	Tsunku	Mikio Sakai
3.	"Chika no Moto e (千香の元へ; Going Back to Chika)"	—	Eiji Kawamura
4.	"Akiramenaizo (あきらめないぞ; I Won't Give Up)"	—	Eiji Kawamura
5.	"Inugoya o Tsukurou! (犬小屋をつくろう!; Let's Make a Dog-house!)"	—	Eiji Kawamura
6.	"Danketsu (団結; United)"	—	Eiji Kawamura
7.	"Hontō no Tomodachi (本当の友達; True Friends)"	—	Eiji Kawamura
8.	"Wasurenai yo (忘れないよ; I Won't Forget You)"	—	Eiji Kawamura
9.	"Kazabana (風花; Petals Scattered in the Wind)"	—	Eiji Kawamura
10.	"Ganbacchae! (がんばっちゃえ!; Let's Go For it!)" (Symphonic version)	—	Tsunku
11.	"Hey! Mirai (HEY! 未来; Hey! Future)" (Symphonic version)	—	Tsunku

== Awards and accolades ==
Year	Award	Category	Work	Result
2003	26th Japan Academy Film Prize All Night Nippon Popularity Award	Most Popular Film	Koinu Dan no Monogatari	Won

== Adaptations ==
=== Manga ===
A manga adaptation written and illustrated by Marimo Shirozawa was serialized in Nakayoshi in 2002. The chapters were later released in one bound volume by Kodansha under the Kodansha Comics Nakayoshi imprint.

No.	Japanese release date	Japanese ISBN
1	December 28, 2002	978-4063640090
