= Airi Suzuki =

Japanese singer, actress, and model

- 鈴木 愛理
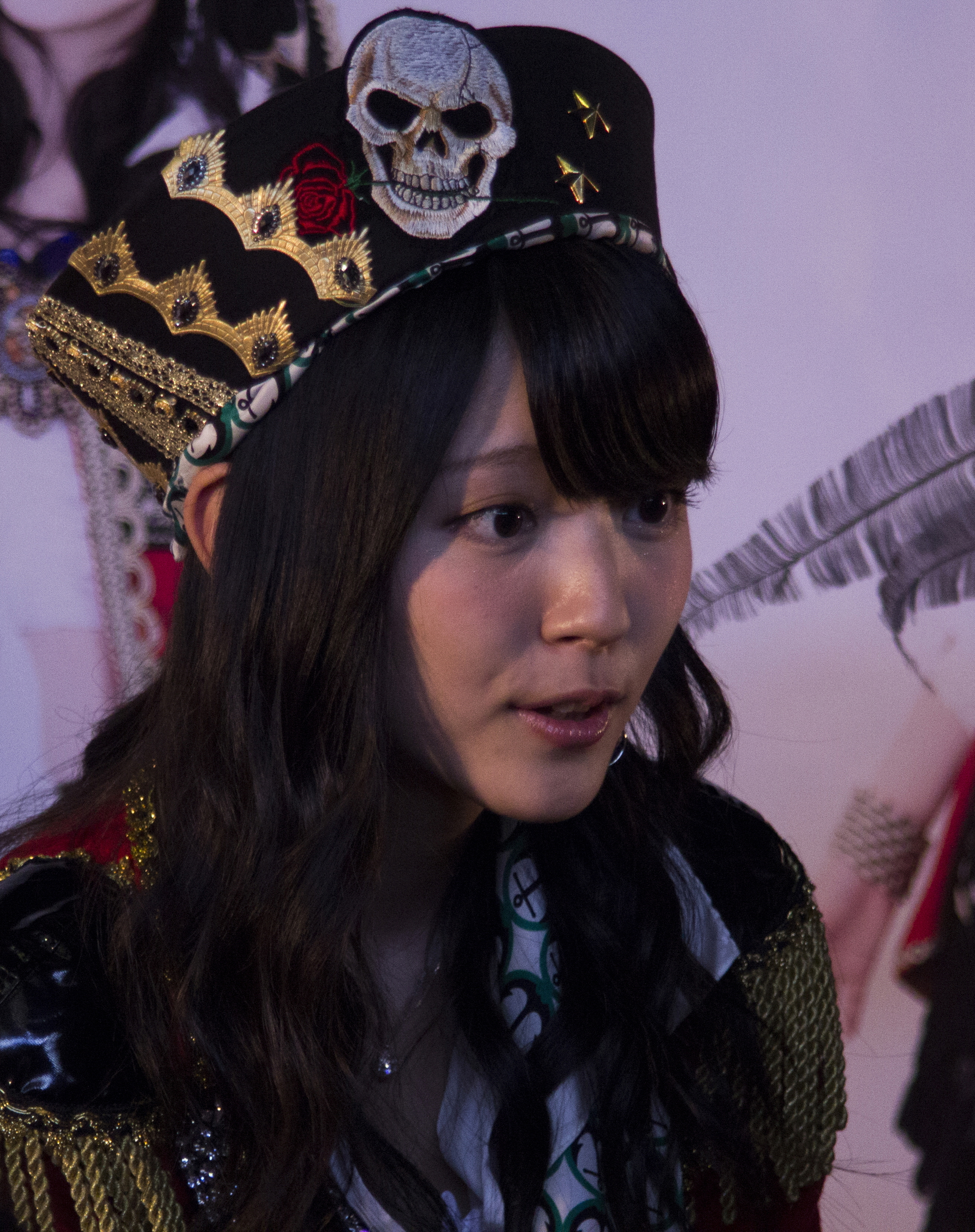
- Airi Suzuki at Japan Expo 2013
- Born: April 12, 1994 (age 32); Ōamishirasato, Japan
- Education: Keio University
- Occupations: Singer; actress; model; radio host
- Agents: Up-Front Promotion (2002–2017); Up-Front Works (2017–present)
- Height: 161 cm (5 ft 3 in)
- Parents: Toru Suzuki (father); Kyoko Maruya (mother)
- Musical career
- Genre: J-pop
- Years active: 2002–present
- Label: zetima
- Formerly of: Cute; Buono!; Hello! Project Kids; Aa!; Dia Lady
- Website: www.airisuzuki-officialweb.com

Signature
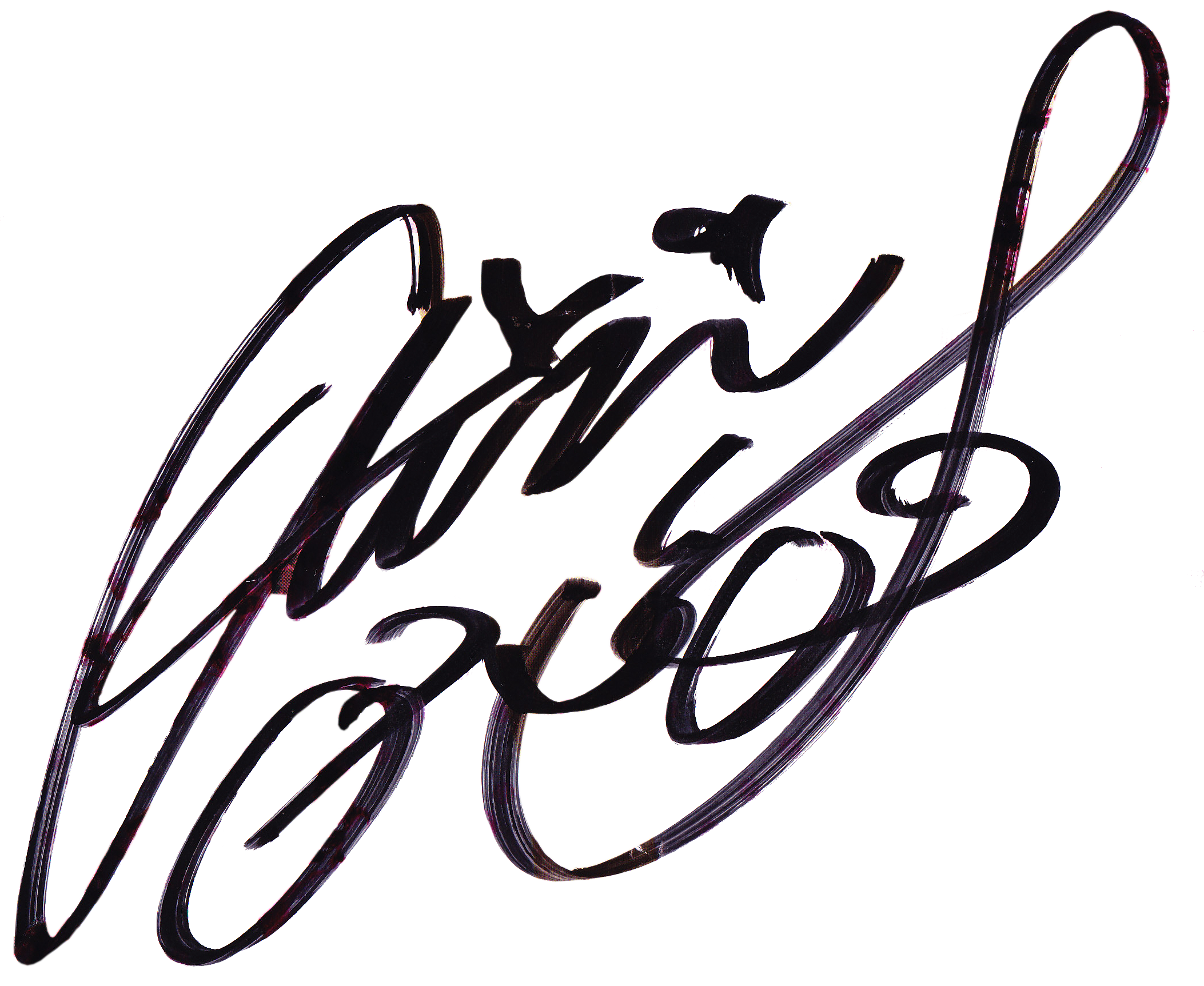

Airi Suzuki (鈴木 愛理, Suzuki Airi; born April 12, 1994) is a Japanese singer, actress, model, and radio personality associated with Up-Front Works. In 2002, she joined Hello! Project as a member of Hello! Project Kids and later debuted as the lead vocalist of the Japanese idol girl group Cute in 2005. Throughout her singing career, Suzuki also became a vocalist for the girl group Buono! From June 2015 onwards, she became an exclusive model for the fashion magazine Ray.

After Cute and Buono! disbanded in 2017, Suzuki left Hello! Project and debuted as a solo singer with the album Do Me a Favor, with "Distance" as its lead track.

== Career ==
=== 2002–2005: Hello! Project Kids, 4Kids, and Aa! ===
Having taken singing lessons since kindergarten, in 2002, Suzuki auditioned for Hello! Project Kids with the song "Kimochi wa Tsutawaru" by BoA. Her audition tape was aired on Morning Musume's variety show Hello! Morning. Suzuki did not intend to become an idol singer and had auditioned because she had wanted to sing. Out of 30,000 applicants, she was placed in the group with 14 other girls. She made her first appearance as an angel in the 2002 film Mini Moni ja Movie: Okashi na Daibōken!; she also was one of the featured artists in the movie's ending song as a member of 4Kids.

In 2003, Suzuki became a member of the subgroup Aa! along with Reina Tanaka from Morning Musume and Miyabi Natsuyaki. They released their first and only single, "First Kiss", on October 29, 2003. Later, in 2004, she participated in singing "All for One & One for All!", a collaboration single released by all Hello! Project artists under the name "H.P. All Stars." She also sang the coupling track, "Suki ni Naccha Ikenai Hito", with Tanaka and Megumi Murakami.

=== 2005–2017: Cute and Buono! ===
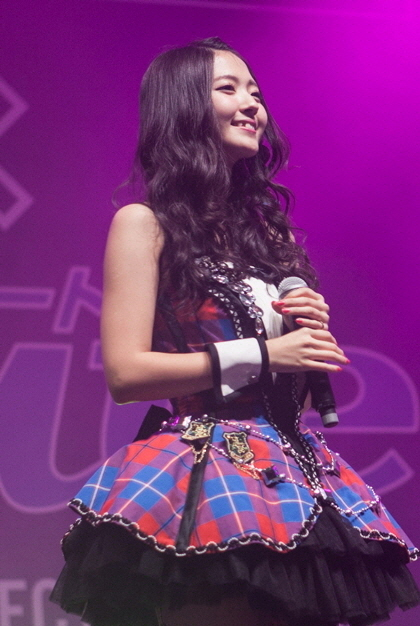
Suzuki performing at Japan Expo 2014

In 2004, Berryz Kobo was created with the intention of rotating all of the members of Hello! Project Kids to make time for school., but the idea was later scrapped, and the remaining girls who were not chosen were rebranded under the name Cute on June 11, 2005. Suzuki became Cute's lead vocalist, and the group made their major label debut in 2007 with "Sakura Chirari."

In 2007, Suzuki also became part of the subgroup Buono! with Momoko Tsugunaga and Miyabi Natsuyaki from Berryz Kobo. The group formed to perform the opening and ending songs for the anime Shugo Chara! They released their first single, "Honto no Jibun", on October 31, 2007. After the show's end, Buono continued on as a side project until its disbandment in 2017. In 2013, Suzuki became part of the subgroup Dia Lady with Risako Sugaya for the Satoumi Movement. Dia Lady released the song "Lady Mermaid" on August 7, 2013, in a compilation album with other artists in the Satoumi Movement.

On April 21, 2015, Suzuki became an exclusive model for the fashion magazine Ray starting from the June edition. Since July 6, 2016, Suzuki has also hosted her own radio show, "Airi's Potion."

In 2016, Cute announced plans to disband in June 2017, citing interest in different career paths as their reason. Suzuki initially planned on modeling and becoming a newscaster but decided on continuing her singing career.

=== 2018–present: Solo activities, Do Me a Favor ===
In April 2018, Suzuki announced her solo debut album, Do Me a Favor, which was set for release on June 6, 2018, and featured collaborations with bands Scandal, Akai Ko-en, and Spicy Chocolate. The album's lead single, "Distance", was released on May 3, 2018, to promote the album, along with music videos for "Distance", "Start Again", and "#DMAF." Do Me a Favor peaked at No. 6 on the Oricon Weekly Albums Chart. On the day of the album's release, Suzuki also released a music video for "Hikari no Hou e", her collaboration song with Akai Ko-en. Suzuki was announced as a musical guest at the Rakuten Girls Award Autumn/Winter 2018 fashion show.

In December 2019, Suzuki released her second album I. The album included the song "Break it Down", which was produced by Official Hige Dandism.

In April 2020, Suzuki appeared as a featured artist on Masayuki Suzuki's song "Daddy! Daddy! Do!", the theme song for the second season of Kaguya-sama: Love is War. In 2022, she sang "Heart wa Oteage", the ending theme for the show's third season.

In July 2022, Suzuki starred in the web drama series Animals, of which her song, "Pink Shadow", was used as the ending theme song.

In September 2023, it was announced that Suzuki would become an MC for the popular variety show, "Azatokute nani ga warui no?"

From January 31 through March 16, Suzuki will be one of two actresses to play the role of Katherine Howard in a dual-cast production of the musical Six.

== Personal life ==
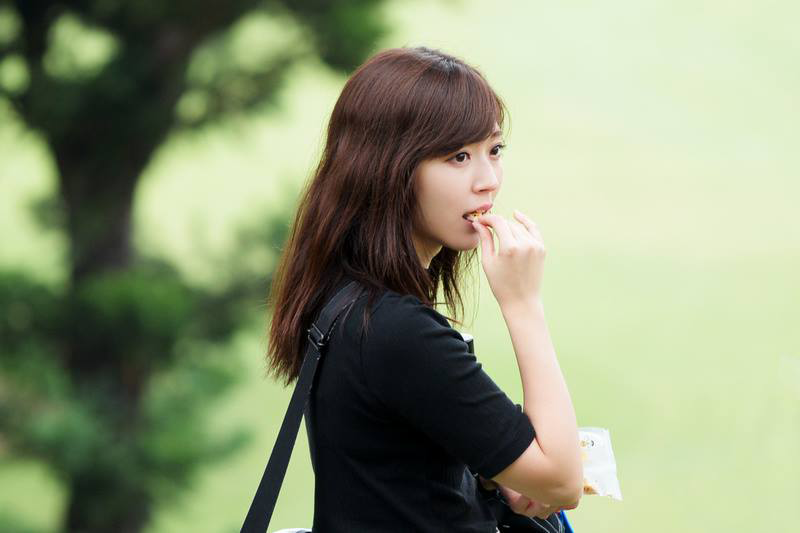
Suzuki (pictured in 2017) at a golf club in Taiwan

Suzuki is the daughter of professional golfers Toru Suzuki and Kyoko Maruya. Suzuki also has a younger brother. She graduated from Keio University in 2017 with a degree in Environmental Studies.

As of December 2022, she is dating professional football player Ao Tanaka.

== Discography ==
=== Studio albums ===
List of studio albums, with selected chart positions, sales figures and certifications
Title	Album details	Peak chart positions		Sales
Title	Album details	JPN Oricon	JPN Hot	Sales
Do Me a Favor	Released: June 6, 2018; Label: Zetima; Format: CD, digital download	6	6	18,273+
I	Released: December 18, 2019; Label: Zetima; Format: CD, digital download	11	11	13,412+
26/27	Released: February 2, 2022; Label: zetima; Format: CD, digital download	9	10	10,760
28/29	Released: March 20, 2024; Label: Epic Records Japan; Format: CD, digital download	18	16	5,021

=== Live albums ===
List of live albums, with selected chart positions, sales figures and certifications
Title	Album details	Peak chart positions		Sales
Title	Album details	JPN		Sales
Title	Album details	Oricon	Billboard Japan	Sales
Suzuki Airi 1st Live: Do Me a Favor @ Nippon Budokan (鈴木愛理 1st LIVE 〜Do me a favor @ 日本武道館〜)	Released: October 31, 2018; Label: Up-Front Works; Format: digital download	—	—	
Suzuki Airi Live Party: No Live, No Life? (鈴木愛理 LIVE PARTY No Live, No Life?)	Released: May 20, 2020; Label: Up-Front Works; Format: digital download	—	— (Note: Charted at number 80 on the Download Albums chart .)	
"—" denotes releases that did not chart or were not released in that region.

=== Singles ===
==== As lead artist ====
Title	Year	Peak chart positions		Sales	Album
Title	Year	JPN	JPN Hot	Sales	Album
"Escape" (Note: "Escape" was released in 3 physical versions, with different B-sides. The digital version "Escape (Special Edition)" compiles the B-sides "Identity", "Daylight" and "The Brand New Look". "Watashi no Migigawa (Sound Inn "S" Version)" (私の右側 (Sound Inn "S" Version)) remains exclusive to "Escape – Edition C". The only B-side to appear on "I" album is "IDENTITY".)	2019	3	— (Note: Charted at number 65 on the Download Songs chart .)	JPN: 39,406	I
"Heart wa Oteage" (ハートはお手上げ)	2022	24	—		28/29
"Heart Notes"	2023	43	—		28/29
"—" denotes releases that did not chart or were not released in that region.

==== Digital singles ====
Title	Year	Peak chart positions		Sales	Album
Title	Year	JPN (Note: Oricon Digital Singles Weekly Charts)	JPN Hot	Sales	Album
"Break it Down"	2019	—	—		I
"Baby! We CanDoIt"	2020	—	—		26/27
"Let The Show Begin"	2020	—	—		26/27
"Kimi ni Dake Hitomishiri (Home Demo ver.)" (きみにだけ人見知り (Home Demo ver.))	2020	—	—		26/27
"Easy to Smile"	2020	—	—		26/27
"Mayonaka no Merry-go-round" (真夜中のメリーゴーランド)	2020	—	—		26/27
"Apple Pie" (with Blue Vintage)	2021	—	—		26/27
"Be Brave"	2021	—	—		26/27
"Rescue"	2021	—	—		26/27
"Pink Shadow (Animals Ver.)"	2022	—	—		28/29
"Saikyo no Oshi!" (最強の推し!) (Note: "Saikyo no Oshi! (TV Version)" was released in October 5, 2023)	2023	48	— (Note: "Saikyo no Oshi !" did not enter the Billboard Japan Hot 100 Chart, but appeared at number 57 on the component Billboard Japan Download Songs Chart.)	JPN: 1,207 DL	28/29
"—" denotes releases that did not chart or were not released in that region.

==== As featured artist ====
Title	Year	Peak chart positions		Sales	Album
Title	Year	JPN	JPN Hot	Sales	Album
"Daddy! Daddy! Do!" (Masayuki Suzuki feat. Airi Suzuki)	2020	15	29		All Time Rock n' Roll
"Kono Te" (この手。) (KureiYuki's feat. Airi Suzuki)	2021	—	—		Non-album singles
"shampoo" (Tsumiki feat. Airi Suzuki)	2023	—	—		Non-album singles
"—" denotes releases that did not chart or were not released in that region.

=== Other appearances ===
Title	Year	Peak chart positions		Album
Title	Year	JPN	JPN Hot	Album
"Genki Jirushi no Ōmori Song" (げんき印の大盛りソング) / "Okashi Tsukutte Okkasi!" (お菓子つくっておっかすぃ〜) (Mini-Moni + Ai Takahashi & 4Kids) (Note: as part of 4Kids)	2002	9	—	Mini-Moni Songs 2
"Suki ni Naccha Ikenai Hito" (好きになっちゃいけない人) (as part of H.P. All Stars)	2004	—	—	All for One & One for All!
"Image Color" (イメージカラー) (with Maimi Yajima)	2008	—	—	3rd: Love Escalation!
"Aa Koi" (嗚呼 恋)) (solo song)	2010	—	—	Shocking 5
"DADDY ! DADDY ! DO ! – From THE FIRST TAKE" (Masayuki Suzuki feat. Airi Suzuki)	2021	—	—	Non-album single
"Soraha Nidomoeru" (空は二度燃える) (40mP feat. Airi Suzuki)	2021	—	—	"Nanji Nanpun Chikyuga Nankai Mwattara" ( 何時何分地球が何回まわったら) – Single
"Across the Horizon" (Love Me (CV.Aimi) × Lovely (CV. Airi Suzuki))	2021	—	—	Panilla ・the ・revival Theme Song
"Sparkle" (with Aimi, Miku Itō, Jin Ogasawara, Gakuto Kajiwara, Dialogue, TrySail, Shugo Nakamura, Kana Hanazawa & Halca)	2022	—	—	Animelo Summer Live 2022 -Sparkle- Theme Song
"—" denotes releases that did not chart or were not released in that region.

=== Video albums ===
List of video albums, with selected chart positions, sales figures and certifications
Title	Album details	Peak chart positions		Sales
Title	Album details	JPN DVD	JPN Blu-ray	Sales
Suzuki Airi 1st Live: Do Me a Favor @ Nippon Budokan (鈴木愛理 1st LIVE 〜Do me a favor @ 日本武道館〜)	Released: October 31, 2018; Label: zetima; Format: DVD, Blu-ray	19	7	
Suzuki Airi Live Tour 2018 "PARALLEL DATE" (鈴木愛理 Live Tour 2018 "Parallel Date")	Released: May 22, 2019; Label: zetima; Format: DVD, Blu-ray	—	17	
Suzuki Airi Live Party: No Live, No Life? (鈴木愛理 LIVE PARTY No Live, No Life?)	Released: May 20, 2020; Label: zetima; Format: Blu-ray	—	17	
Suzuki Airi Live Party: No Live, No Life? (鈴木愛理 LIVE PARTY No Live, No Life?) (Note: This release has the same name as the previous one but different content.)	Released: June 7, 2023; Label: zetima; Format: Blu-ray	—	14	
Suzuki Airi LIVE 2023 ~Kokoro no Otowo~ (鈴木愛理 LIVE 2023～ココロノオトヲ～)	Released: November 29, 2023; Label: zetima; Format: Blu-ray	—	—	
"—" denotes releases that did not chart or were not released in that region.

== Filmography ==
=== Film ===
Year	Title	Role	Notes	Ref.
2002	Mini Moni ja Movie: Okashi na Daibōken!	Airin the Angel	Performed ending song as 4Kids	
2011	Vampire Stories	Midori	Lead role in Brothers	
2011	Ring of Curse	Yuka Hidaka	Lead role; feature film with Buono!	
2011	Ōsama Game	Ria Iwamura	Lead role	
2026	A Place Called Home	Eriko Asai	Lead role	
2026	Love Me Kill Me	Sakura Todo	Lead role	

=== Television ===
Year	Title	Role	Notes	Ref.
2002–2007	Hello! Morning	Herself	Morning Musume's variety show	
2002–2004	Hello Kids	Herself	Mini-Moni's variety show	
2005	Musume Document 2005	Herself	Morning Musume's vaRadio show	
2005–2006	Musume Dokyu!	Herself	Morning Musume's variety show	
2007–2008	Haromoni	Herself	Morning Musume's variety show	
2008	Berikyū!	Herself	Berryz Kobo and Cute's variety show	
2008	Yorosen!	Herself	Hello! Project's variety show	
2008	Hit Maker Aku Yu Monogatari	Junko Sakurada	Television film	
2009	Bijo Houdan	Herself	Hello! Project's variety show	
2010	Bijo Gaku	Herself	Hello! Project's variety show	
2011–2012	Hello Pro! Time	Herself	Hello! Project's variety show	
2011	Keitai Kanojo	Erika Kuraishi	Lead role; direct-to-DVD	
2012	Sūgaku Joshi Gakuen	Yuri Uehara		
2012	Piece	Madoka Setouchi		
2012–2013	Hello! Satoyama Life	Herself	Hello! Project's variety show	
2014	Kinkyori Renai: Season Zero	Maika	Episode 12	
2014–2017	The Girls Live	Herself	Up-Front Works's variety show	
2017	Hitoshi Ueki and Nobosemon	Chiyo Okumura	Episode 2	
2019	I Turn	Mizuki Yoshimura		
2021	Ōishi Masayoshi to Suzuki Airi no Anison Kamikyoku desho de Show!	Herself	Co-host	
2021	140ji no Koi	Tsuji Itoka	Lead role	
2021	Black Cinderella	Louis		
2021	Kaisha wa Gakkō Janen da yo Shin Sedai Gyakushū-hen	Ichika		
2022	Animals	Shikamori Umi	Lead role	
2023	My Oshi Is Now My Boss	Hitomi Nakajo	Lead role	

=== Theater ===
Year	Title	Role	Notes	Ref.
2004	Here's Love	Susan Walker	Double-cast with Megumi Murakami	
2007	Neruko wa Cute	Herself	Lead role	
2008	Keitai Shōsetsuka	Herself	Lead role	
2009	Ataru mo Hakke!?	Herself	Lead role	
2010	Akuma no Tsubuyaki	Herself	Lead role	
2011	Sengoku Jietai	Herself	Lead role in Defense	
2013	Sakura no Hanataba	Michiru Saeki	Lead role	
2025	Six	Katherine Howard	Lead Role, Double-cast with Erika Toyohara	

=== Radio ===
Year	Title	Role	Notes	Ref.
2008–2009	Cute Cutie Paradise	Radio host	with Erika Umeda	
2011	Viva! Paella presents Music Buono!	Radio host	with Buono!	
2011–2013	Pizza-La presents Cafe Buono!	Radio host	with Buono!	
2013–2015	Pizza-La presents Trattoria Buono!	Radio host	with Buono!	
2016–present	Airi's Potion	Radio host		

=== Japanese dub ===
Minions and Monsters (2026), Debbie (Zoey Deutch)

=== Solo DVDs ===
List of solo DVDs, with selected chart positions, sales figures and certifications
Title	Year	Details	Peak chart positions	Sales
Title	Year	Details	JPN	Sales
Cute Suzuki Airi in Okinawa: Airi's Classic (°C-ute 鈴木愛理 in 沖縄 AIRI'S CLASSIC)	2008	Released: June 25, 2008; Label: Zetima; Formats: DVD	45	—
Pure Blue	2009	Released: July 1, 2009; Label: Zetima; Formats: DVD	27	—
Natsu Yasumi (夏休み)	2010	Released: August 25, 2010; Label: Zetima; Formats: DVD	63	—
Kibun Tenkan (気分てんかん)	2011	Released: July 13, 2011; Label: Zetima; Formats: DVD	44	—
Natsu Karada (夏カラダ)	2011	Released: August 8, 2011; Label: Zetima; Formats: DVD	73	—
Koko ga Suki (ここが好き)	2012	Released: July 25, 2012; Label: Zetima; Formats: DVD	81	—
Watashi no Key wo Shittemasu ka (私の∮Keyを知ってますか)	2013	Released: September 25, 2013; Label: Zetima; Formats: DVD	—	—
Singapore (新嘉坡)	2014	Released: June 25, 2014; Label: Zetima; Formats: DVD	—	—
"—" denotes releases that did not chart or were not released in that region.

== Publications ==
=== Photobooks ===
1. Airi (愛理) (May 19, 2007, Wani Books, ISBN 978-4-8470-4007-8)
2. Clear (CLEAR) (December 5, 2007, Kadokawa Group Publishing, ISBN 978-4-0489-5004-6)
3. 6gatsu no Kajitsu (6月の果実; "June Fruit") (June 20, 2008, Wani Books, ISBN 978-4-8470-4084-9)
4. Aoiro (蒼色; "Blue Color") (June 25, 2009, Wani Books, ISBN 978-4-8470-4171-6)
5. Tōkō-bi (登校日, "School Day") (August 20, 2010, Wani Books, ISBN 978-4847043024)
6. Meguru Haru (巡る春, "Spring Around") (May 23, 2011, Wani Books, ISBN 978-4-8470-4363-5)
7. Oasis (OASIS) (June 23, 2011, Wani Books, ISBN 978-4-8470-4364-2)
8. Kono Kaze ga Suki (この風が好き; "I Like This Wind") (June 25, 2012, Wani Books, ISBN 978-4847044649)
9. Sotsugyou (卒業, "Graduation") (March 31, 2013, Wani Books, ISBN 978-4-8470-4540-0)
10. Oyoganai Natsu (泳がない夏, "Summer Without Swimming") (August 20, 2013, Wani Books, ISBN 978-4-8470-4572-1)
11. Kyomei (共鳴, "Resonance") (April 12, 2014, Wani Books, ISBN 978-4-8470-4641-4)
12. Eien (永遠, "Eternity") (March 31, 2017, Wani Books, ISBN 978-4-8470-4910-1)
13. nectar (November 17, 2022, Shufu no Tomo, ISBN 978-4-0734-4774-0)

==== Digital photobooks ====
- Alo-Hello! C-ute (アロハロ！°C-ute) (Airi version)) (2010.09.16)
- Cutest (Airi Version 2012.03.04)
- Koisuru Otome (A Girl in Love (2012.05.11)
- Suzuki Airi Iris: Airis (SUZUKI AIRI Iris〜アイリス〜) (2012.10.16)
- Alo-Hello! C-ute 2012 (アロハロ！°C-ute 2012) (Airi version)) (2012.10.22)

=== Photo-essays ===
- Suzuki Airi Perfect Book "Airi-aL" (Photographic essay, December 27, 2012, Wani Books, ISBN 978-4-8470-4520-2)
- Eita × Suzuki Airi Eita Produce Magic Make-up (Photographic essay, May 20, 2013, Standard Magazine, ISBN 978-4-9382-8024-6)
- Suzuki Airi Style Book "Airi-sT" (Photographic essay, November 27, 2014, Wani Books, ISBN 978-4-8470-4711-4)
- OTONA STYLE BOOK "Airimania" (Photographic essay, May 23, 2017, Shufu no Tomo, ISBN 978-4-0742-4131-6)

== Tours ==
- Airi Suzuki Live Tour 2018 "Parallel Date" (2018)
