= Vampire Stories: Brothers =

Vampire Stories Brothers
- Directed by: Hikaru Gotō
- Starring: Tomo Yanagishita; Tetsuya Makita; Takako Hasuna; Toru Baba; Airi Suzuki
- Cinematography: Kōmei Fujimoto
- Release date: October 8, 2011
- Running time: 94 minutes
- Country: Japan
- Language: Japanese

Vampire Stories Brothers (ヴァンパイア・ストーリーズ BROTHERS) is a 2011 Japanese film directed by Hikaru Gotō.

== Synopsis ==
Vampire Stories: Brothers, is the first part of a two-part story that tells the fate of two brothers that are both descended from vampires. When the university friends of Sei and Midori are savagely killed, the sudden tragedy leaves them stunned. Sei's older brother Ai then reappears after having gone missing five years earlier. He reveals to a confused Sei the shocking truth behind the murders, and of the destiny they must shoulder together as brothers: Ai tells Sei that he, like Ai, is a pure blood vampire and that he will turn at the age of 20. Sei has to choose to live or die and what lies in middle of his decision is his younger step sister, Midori, whom he cares for. What will Sei choose? Midori, his younger step-sister or Ai, his older vampire brother? To live or to die?

== Cast ==
- Tomo Yanagishita
- Tetsuya Makita
- Takako Hasuna
- Toru Baba
- Airi Suzuki

Japanese metal band Versailles provided the theme, "Vampire", from their third album Holy Grail. Their vocalist Kamijo was also in charge as a music producer.
