= ZYX (pop group) =

Japanese idol girl group

- ZYX, 2003: Back row (L to R): Erika Umeda, Mari Yaguchi, Maimi Yajima. Front row (L to R): Saki Shimizu, Megumi Murakami, Momoko Tsugunaga.

Background information
- Origin: Japan
- Genres: J-pop
- Years active: 2003–2004; 2015
- Label: Piccolo Town
- Spinoffs: ZYX-Alpha
- Spinoff of: Morning Musume; Hello! Project Kids
- Past members: Mari Yaguchi; Erika Umeda; Saki Shimizu; Maimi Yajima; Megumi Murakami; Momoko Tsugunaga
- Website: www.helloproject.com

ZYX (ジックス, Jikkusu; pronounced zicks) was a Japanese idol project group associated with Hello! Project. It was formed by Up-Front Promotion in 2003. Its members consisted of Morning Musume member Mari Yaguchi and Hello! Project Kids members Erika Umeda, Saki Shimizu, Maimi Yajima, Momoko Tsugunaga, and Megumi Murakami. The group remained active until 2004.

== History ==
The name ZYX is a kind of acronym using a somewhat intricate play in notation. "Z" and "Y" are taken from the phrase Zettai Yume o Bai ni (絶対、夢を倍に; Definitely double your dreams) "Bai ni," meaning "double in size," is represented not as "B" but as a multiplication sign "×" which was then represented by the letter "X."

On February 28 and March 1, 2015, ZYX reformed for Berryz Kobo Matsuri with Momoko Tsuguana, Saki Shimizu and Maimi Yajima to perform "Shiroi Tokyo", the first time members of the original ZYX line-up have reformed under the name ZYX since 2006.

== Members ==
- Mari Yaguchi (Leader)
- Erika Umeda
- Saki Shimizu
- Maimi Yajima
- Momoko Tsugunaga
- Megumi Murakami

== Legacy ==
In 2009, ZYX was revived as ZYX-Alpha (stylized as ZYX-α) as a Hello! Project Shuffle Unit. Tsugunaga and Umeda, now members of Berryz Kobo and Cute respectively, rejoined as members of the group. New additions to the group included Morning Musume members Risa Niigaki and Koharu Kusumi; Berryz Kobo member Chinami Tokunaga and Maasa Sudo; and Smileage members Ayaka Wada and Saki Ogawa. The group released songs for Hello! Project's compilation albums Champloo 1: Happy Marriage Song Cover Shū and Petit Best 10. The group was also active as a concert-only unit until 2011. In 2013, for Hello! Project's 15th anniversary, Tsugunaga, Sudo, Wada, Tokunaga, and Niigaki (as a special guest) performed together.

== Discography ==
=== Singles ===
Title	Release date	Coupling
Iku ZYX! Fly High (行くZYX! Fly High; "Go ZYX! Fly High")	2003-08-06	Gatamekira ZYX ver. (ガタメキラ; "Gotta Make it Love")
Shiroi Tokyo (白いTOKYO; "White Tokyo")	2003-12-10	Tokonatsu-Musume ZYX ver. (常夏娘; "Endless Summer Girls")

=== DVDs ===
Title	Release date
Single V: Iku ZYX! Fly High (シングルV・行くZYX! Fly High)	2003-09-10
Single V: Shiroi Tokyo (シングルV・白いTOKYO)	2003-12-26
