= Yuki Maeda =

Yuki Maeda 前田 有紀
- Also known as: Yukidon
- Born: August 28, 1979 (age 46); Kōchi, Kōchi Prefecture, Japan
- Genres: Enka
- Occupation: Singer
- Years active: 1998-2011
- Labels: Teichiku, Zetima, Rice Music
- Website: Hello! Project.com

Yuki Maeda (前田 有紀, Maeda Yuki; born August 28, 1979) is a former Japanese enka singer within Hello! Project. She started her career under the enka record label Teichiku in 2000 with her debut single "Naki Usagi", but did not have any charting singles in Japan until she signed with Up-Front Works and their label Zetima in 2003. In mid-2004 she was transferred to another Up-Front Works' label, Rice Music.

== Discography ==
The following CDs are released by Teichiku, Zetima, and Rice Music.

=== Singles ===
#	Title	Release date	Peak rank
1	"Naki Usagi" (鳴きうさぎ)	April 12, 2000	–
2	"Tokyo You Turn" (東京 You ターン, Tōkyō You Tān)	January 1, 2001	–
3	"Tokyo, Yoimachigusa" (東京, 宵町草。)	February 21, 2002	–
4	"Tokyo Kirigirisu" (東京きりぎりす)	July 16, 2003	#134
5	"Sarasara no Kawa" (さらさらの川; "The River of Rustling")	January 1, 2004	#130
6	"Nishishinjuku de Atta Hito" (西新宿で逢ったひと; "The People Who Met in Nishinshinjuku")	September 29, 2004	#83
7	"Omae no Namida o Ore ni Kure" (お前の涙を俺にくれ)	July 26, 2006	#182
8	"Ai Ai Daiko" (相愛太鼓)	September 26, 2007	#119
9	"Kenchana: Daijōbu" (ケンチャナ～大丈夫～)	February 25, 2009	#118
10	"Mianeyo: Gomennasai" (ミアネヨ ～ごめんなさい～)	April 7, 2010	#106
11	"Pusan-hatsu" (釜山発)	May 25, 2011	#130

=== Albums ===
#	Title	Release date
1	Maeda Yuki Zenkyoku-shū: Kenchana (前田有紀 全曲集 ～ケンチャナ～)	September 9, 2009
2	Pusan-hatsu: Kankoku Series Best (釜山発 ～韓国シリーズベスト～)	November 22, 2011
