= Momoko Tsugunaga =

Japanese singer and actress

- 嗣永 桃子
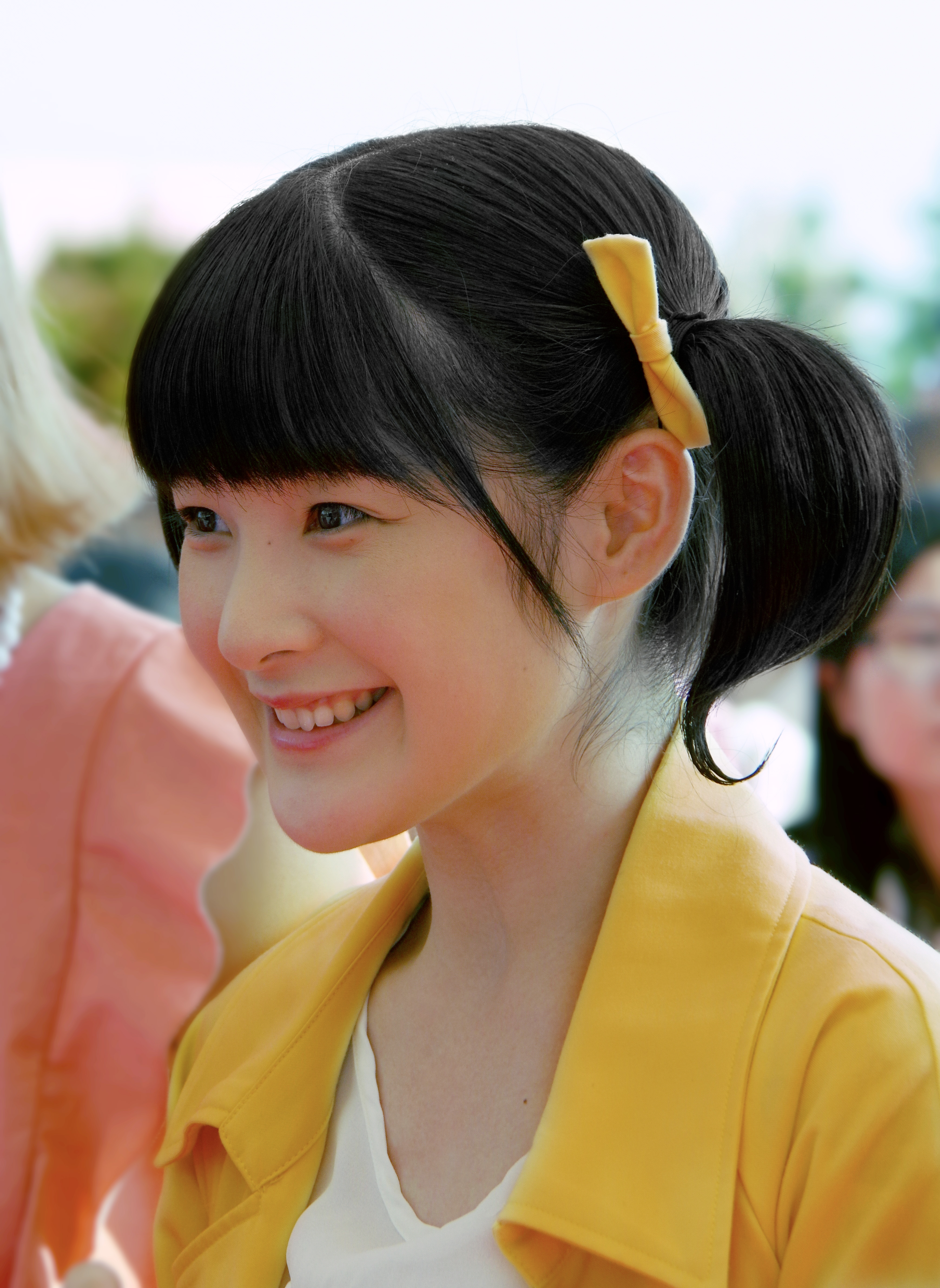
- Tsugunaga at MTV Video Music Awards Japan 2014
- Born: March 6, 1992 (age 34); Kashiwa, Chiba, Japan
- Other name: Momochi
- Occupations: Singer; actress
- Agents: Up-Front Promotion (2002–2014); Up-Front Works (2014–2017)
- Musical career
- Genres: J-pop
- Years active: 2002–2017
- Label: Zetima
- Formerly of: Country Girls; Berryz Kobo; Buono!; ZYX; H.P. All Stars; Hello! Project Kids

Momoko Tsugunaga (嗣永 桃子, Tsugunaga Momoko; born March 6, 1992) is a Japanese former singer, actress, and radio personality. Tsugunaga joined Hello! Project as a member of Hello! Project Kids at the age of 10 and later became part of the girl groups Berryz Kobo and Buono! Following Berryz Kobo's hiatus, she became the playing manager of Country Girls. In 2017, Tsugunaga retired from entertainment to become a kindergarten teacher.

== Career ==
=== 2002–2004: Hello! Project Kids and ZYX ===
In 2002, Tsugunaga auditioned for Hello! Project Kids with the song "Koi wo Shicchaimashita!" by Tanpopo. Her audition tape was aired on Morning Musume's variety show Hello! Morning. She was placed in the group with 14 other girls. In the same year, she starred in the movie Koinu Dan no Monogatari as the main character, Mao Morishita.

In 2003, Tsugunaga appeared in the music video for Miki Fujimoto's "Boogie Train '03." She also became a member of the subgroup ZYX along with Mari Yaguchi from Morning Musume, Erika Umeda, Maimi Yajima, Saki Shimizu, and Megumi Murakami. They released their debut single, "Iku ZYX! Fly High" on August 6, 2003, followed by "Shiroi Tokyo" on December 10, 2003. Later, in 2004, she participated in singing "All for One & One for All!", a collaboration single released by all Hello! Project artists under the name "H.P. All Stars."

=== 2004–2015: Berryz Kobo and Buono! ===
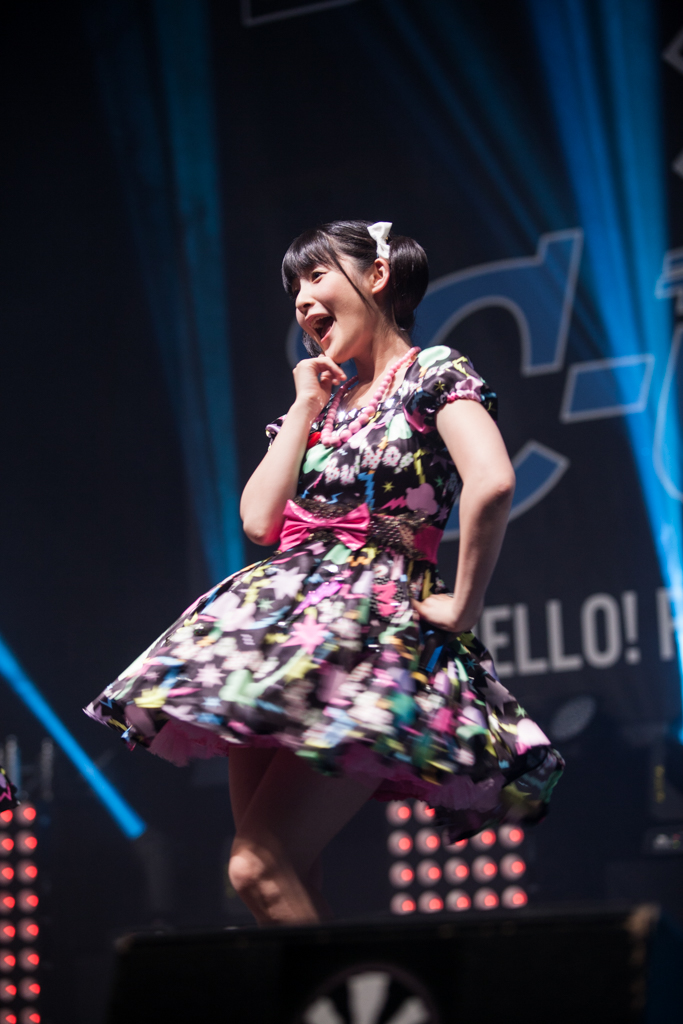
Tsugunaga performing at Japan Expo 2014

In 2004, Tsugunaga was one of the eight girls from Hello! Project Kids were selected to form Berryz Kobo. Berryz Kobo debuted on March 3, 2004, with the single "Anata Nashi de wa Ikite Yukenai", and she was one of the lead singers of the group. From 2009 until 2014, Tsugunaga also hosted a radio show titled "Momoko Tsugunaga from Berryz Kobo's Pri-Pri-Princess."

Continuing with her "Momochi" personality, Tsugunaga released a solo song and music video called "Momochi! Yurushite Nyan Taiso", which was released as a B-side to Berryz Kobo's 29th single, "Cha Cha Sing."

In 2007, Tsugunaga also became part of the subgroup Buono! with Miyabi Natsuyaki and Airi Suzuki from Cute. The group formed to perform the opening and ending songs for the anime Shugo Chara! They released their first single, "Honto no Jibun", on October 31, 2007. After the show's end, Buono continued on as a side project until its disbandment in 2017.

=== 2015–2017: Country Girls and retirement ===
In 2014, Berryz Kobo announced they would end activities the following year. After Berryz Kobo went on hiatus, Tsugunaga took on the role as the "playing manager" for the girl group Country Girls, a revival of a Hello! Project group formerly under the name Country Musume.

On November 5, 2016, at Shinjuku ReNY, during Country Girls' second anniversary event, Tsugunaga announced that she would retire from the entertainment industry the following year to become a kindergarten teacher. To commemorate her graduation, a compilation CD album titled Tsugunaga Momoko Idol 15 Shuunen Kinen Album Arigatou Otomomochi (嗣永桃子 アイドル15周年記念アルバム ♡ありがとう おとももち♡, Tsugunaga Momoko Aidoru 15 Shuunen Kinen Arubamu Arigatou Otomomochi) was released on June 21, 2017, with songs selected by fan vote. Tsugunaga held her final concert on June 30, 2017, in an outdoor venue at Odaiba, exactly 15 years after her debut in Hello! Project Kids. 8,000 people attended the concert, including Berryz Kobo and Cute.

== Personal life ==
=== Public image ===
During Berryz Kobo's later years, Tsugunaga became known as the "cutesy character" of the group and with her mannerisms and twintail hairstyle. She was often referred to by the nickname Momochi (ももち) in media and press. After Berryz Kobo went on hiatus, she began playing down her "Momochi" image and stopped wearing her hair in twintails, citing that she has grown up. In Tsugunaga's later idol career, she would have her pinky finger raised while performing, which she stated was meant as an "antenna" to "receive her fans' love." Tsugunaga ended her final concert by lowering her pinky finger as a sign of ending her idol activities.

=== Education ===
Tsugunaga majored in education and graduated from Kokugakuin University in 2014.

== Discography ==
=== Albums ===
Title	Year	Album details	Peak chart positions		Sales
Title	Year	Album details	JPN		Sales
Title	Year	Album details	Oricon	Billboard Japan	Sales
Momoko Tsugunaga 15th Year Idol Anniversary Album: Thank You, Momo-friends (嗣永桃子 アイドル15周年記念アルバム ♡ありがとう おとももち♡)	2017	Released: June 28, 2017; Label: Up-Front Promotion; Formats: CD	19	—	—
"—" denotes releases that did not chart or were not released in that region.

=== DVD ===
Title	Release date	Label / Notes	Highest position
Title	Release date	Label / Notes	Oricon Weekly DVD Chart
Momo Only	December 3, 2008	Piccolo Town	32
Momo OK	September 9, 2009	Piccolo Town	20
Momochi DVD Zukan (ももち DVD図鑑)	October 27, 2010	Piccolo Town	58
Momo Play (ももプレ♡)	March 6, 2011	e-LineUP! limited edition	
Momo Play 2: Kaitō Momo Seine (ももプレ♡2 〜怪盗モモセーヌ〜)	December 23, 2011	e-LineUP! limited edition	
Momochi Hatachi (ももち はたち)	April 25, 2012	Piccolo Town	94
Momo Play 3: Rest Another Day (ももプレ3 〜Rest Another Day〜)	March 6, 2013	e-LineUP! limited edition	

== Bibliography ==
=== Photobooks ===
- Momo (momo) (June 19, 2007, ISBN 978-484704018-4)
- Momo16 (Momoiro) (momo16 -ももいろ-; "Momo16 Peach-colored") (March 19, 2008, ISBN 978-404895015-2)
- Momo no Mi (桃の実; "Peach Seeds") (November 21, 2008, Wani Books, ISBN 978-4847041389)
- Momochiiii (momochiiii) (August 21, 2009, Wani Books, ISBN 978-4847041921)
- Momochi Zukan (ももち図鑑) (October 20, 2010, Wani Books, ISBN 978-4-8470-4322-2)
- Hatachi Momochi (はたち ももち) (March 6, 2012, Wani Books, ISBN 978-4-8470-4444-1)

=== Photo-essays ===
- Momochi no Kimochi (ももちのきもち) (Photographic essay, June 22, 2013, Wani Books, ISBN 978-4-8470-4559-2)

== Filmography ==
=== Film ===
Year	Title	Role	Notes
2002	Koinu Dan no Monogatari	Mao Morishita	Lead role
2004	Promise Land: Clover no Daibōken	Sae Ōmori	Lead role; television movie
2011	Ring of Curse	Shiori Sonoda	Lead role; feature film with Buono!
2011	Ōsama Game	Yūko Inomoto	Supporting role

=== Television ===
Year	Title	Role	Network	Notes
2002-2007	Hello! Morning	Herself	TV Tokyo	Morning Musume's variety show
2002-2004	Hello Kids	Herself	TV Tokyo	Minimoni's variety show
2005	Musume Document 2005	Herself	TV Tokyo	Hello! Project's variety show
2005-2006	Musume Dokyu!	Herself	TV Tokyo	Hello! Project's variety show
2007-2008	Haromoni	Herself	TV Tokyo	Morning Musume's variety show
2008	Berikyū!	Herself	TV Tokyo	Berryz Kobo and Cute's variety show
2008	Yorosen!	Herself	TV Tokyo	Hello! Project's variety show
2009	Bijo Houdan	Herself	TV Tokyo	Hello! Project's variety show
2010	Bijo Gaku	Herself	TV Tokyo	Hello! Project's variety show
2011-2012	Hello Pro! Time	Herself	TV Tokyo	Hello! Project's variety show
2012	Sūgaku Joshi Gakuen	Tomoko Harajuku	NTV	Episode 6
2012-2013	Hello! Satoyama Life	Herself	TV Tokyo	Hello! Project's variety show
2014-2017	The Girls Live	Herself	TV Tokyo	Up-Front Works's variety show
2014-2015	Oha Suta	Herself	TV Tokyo	Variety show MC on Thursdays
2014-2016	Haiku Saku Saku	Herself	NHK	Variety show panelist

=== Theater ===
Year	Title	Role	Notes
2006	Edo Kara Chakushin!?: Timeslip to Kengai!	Fuu	Lead role
2007	Reverse!: Watashi no Karada Doko Desu ka?	Herself	Lead role
2008	Berryz Kobo VS Berryz Kobo	Herself	Lead role
2009	Thank You Very Berry	Manaka Konishi	Lead role
2010	Sanokuen Shōjo	Herself	Lead role
2011	Sengoku Jietai	Herself	Lead role in Defense
2013	Warera Jeanne: Shōjo Seisen Kageki	Belle	Supporting role

=== Music video ===
Year	Artist	Song	Notes
2003	Miki Fujimoto	"Boogie Train '03"	
2004	W	"Aa Ii na!"	Back-up dancer (with Berryz Kobo)
2004	W	"Robo Kiss"	Back-up dancer (with Berryz Kobo)

=== Radio ===
Year	Title	Role	Notes
2004-2009	Berryz Kobo Chaku! Seki! Rei!	Radio host	with Berryz Kobo
2009-2014	Berryz Kobo Tsugunaga Momoko no Pri-Pri-Princess	Radio host	
2011	Viva! Paella presents Music Buono!	Radio host	with Buono!
2011-2013	Pizza-La presents Cafe Buono!	Radio host	with Buono!
2013-2015	Pizza-La presents Trattoria Buono!	Radio host	with Buono!
2016-2017	Ijūin Hikaru to Radio to	News correspondent	
