= Meguru Koi no Kisetsu =

- Regular Edition cover

Single by Cute

from the album 3rd: Love Escalation!
- Released: July 11, 2007 (JP)
- Genre: J-pop
- Label: Zetima
- Songwriter: Tsunku
- Producer: Tsunku

Cute singles chronology
"Sakura Chirari" (2007)	"Meguru Koi no Kisetsu" (2007)	"Tokaikko Junjō" (2007)

Music video
- "Meguru Koi no Kisetsu" on YouTube

"Meguru Koi no Kisetsu" (めぐる恋の季節; Season of love coming around) is the second major single from the Japanese pop group Cute, released on July 11, 2007, on the Zetima label. The limited edition features a DVD with the PV.

It is a danceable upbeat number.

The single debuted at number 5 in the Oricon Weekly Singles Chart, remaining in the chart for 4 weeks.

This song was being used in the anime "Robī to Kerobī" (ロビーとケロビー, Robby & Kerobby) as the second opening song.

== Track listing ==
All tracks are written by Tsunku.

No.	Title	Length
1.	"Meguru Koi no Kisetsu" (めぐる恋の季節)
2.	"Bishōjo Shinri" (美少女心理, "Psychology of a pretty young girl")
3.	"Meguru Koi no Kisetsu (Instrumental)" (めぐる恋の季節（Instrumental）)

== Charts ==
Chart (2007)	Peak position	Weeks on chart
Oricon Weekly Singles Chart	5	4

== Awards ==
=== Japan Cable Awards ===
The Japan Cable Awards (日本有線大賞, Nihon Yūsen Taishō) are sponsored by the National Cable Music Broadcasters Association (全国有線音楽放送協会).

Year	Nominee / work	Award	Result
2007	"Meguru Koi no Kisetsu"	Cable Music Award	Won
