= Erika Umeda =

Japanese singer and model (born 1991)

Erika Umeda 梅田 えりか
- Born: May 24, 1991 (age 35)
- Origin: Minami-ku, Yokohama, Japan
- Genre: J-pop
- Occupation: Singer
- Years active: 2002–present
- Label: Brand-New Music
- Formerly of: Cute; Hello! Project Kids; ZYX
- Website: ameblo.jp/umeda-erika

Erika Umeda (梅田 えりか, Umeda Erika; born on May 24, 1991) is a Japanese singer and former model. In 2002, she became a member of Hello! Project in their junior group, Hello! Project Kids. In 2003, she became a member of the girl group ZYX before formally debuting in Cute in 2006. In 2009, Umeda graduated from Cute and Hello! Project to pursue a solo career in modeling. In 2013, she returned to her music career with the release of her debut solo single "Crush On You."

== Career ==
=== 2002–2004: Hello! Project Kids and ZYX ===
Umeda was born in Minami-ku, Yokohama, Japan. In 2002, she auditioned for Hello! Project Kids with the song "White Love" by Speed. Her audition tape was aired on Morning Musume's variety show Hello! Morning. She was placed in the group with 14 other girls. In the same year, she appeared in the movie Koinu Dan no Monogatari.

In 2003, Umeda became a member of the subgroup ZYX along with Mari Yaguchi from Morning Musume, Maimi Yajima, Saki Shimizu, Megumi Murakami, and Momoko Tsugunaga. They released their debut single, "Iku ZYX! Fly High" on August 6, 2003, followed by "Shiroi Tokyo" on December 10, 2003. Later, in 2004, she participated in singing "All for One & One for All!", a collaboration single released by all Hello! Project artists under the name "H.P. All Stars."

=== 2005–2009: Cute ===
In 2004, Berryz Kobo was created with the intention of rotating all of the members of Hello! Project Kids to make time for school, but the idea was later scrapped, and the remaining girls who were not chosen were rebranded under the name Cute on June 11, 2005. On August 1, 2009, Hello! Project announced that Umeda was graduating from the company on October 25, 2009, the last day of Cute's concert tour, to become a fashion model.

=== 2010–present: Solo career ===
In 2010, Umeda was signed into a model agency called Illume Models. She made her runaway debut in Girls Award Summer 2010 and continued to appear as a regular model at every seasonal show until 2013. She also appeared at the Tokyo Girls Collection Spring/Summer 2012 show.

In 2013, Umeda left modeling to return to music and signed with Brand-New Music. She released her first solo album Erika on February 12, 2014, with the lead single "Crush On You." In 2018, she became the advisor for the girl group Turtle Lily.

== Personal life ==
On August 15, 2021, Umeda announced on her blog and Instagram account that she had married Hirokasu Goto, a radio personality from Niigata Prefecture, and that she was pregnant with their first child. Their son was born on January 1, 2022. Their second son was born in June 2023. On July 2, 2026, Umeda announced through her Instagram account that she and Goto had divorced in March 2025 but have a co-parenting relationship.

== Discography ==
=== Albums ===
List of albums, with selected chart positions, sales figures and certifications
Title	Year	Album details	Peak chart positions	Sales
Title	Year	Album details	JPN	Sales
Erika	2014	Released: February 12, 2014; Label: Brand-New Music; Formats: CD	—	—
"—" denotes releases that did not chart or were not released in that region.

== Filmography ==
=== Film ===
Year	Title	Role	Notes
2002	Koinu Dan no Monogatari	Madoka Nishizawa	Supporting role

=== Television ===
Year	Title	Role	Network	Notes
2002–2007	Hello! Morning	Herself	TV Tokyo	Morning Musume's variety show
2002–2004	Hello Kids	Herself	TV Tokyo	Minimoni's variety show
2005	Musume Document 2005	Herself	TV Tokyo	Morning Musume's variety show
2005–2006	Musume Dokyu!	Herself	TV Tokyo	Morning Musume's variety show
2007-2008	Haromoni@	Herself	TV Tokyo	Morning Musume's variety show
2008	Berikyū!	Herself	TV Tokyo	Berryz Kobo and Cute's variety show
2008	Yorosen!	Herself	TV Tokyo	Hello! Project's variety show
2009	Bijo Houdan	Herself	TV Tokyo	Hello! Project's variety show

=== Music video ===
Year	Artist	Song	Notes
2003	Miki Fujimoto	"Boogie Train '03"	
2011	Shiki Canata	"Have a Nice Day"	Episode 1: "Goodbye, My First Love"

=== Theater ===
Year	Title	Role	Notes
2007	Neruko wa Cute	Herself	Lead role
2008	Keitai Shōsetsuka	Herself	Lead role
2009	Ataru mo Hakke!?	Herself	Lead role
2014	Goodbye Joker		

=== Radio ===
Year	Title	Role	Notes
2006–2008	Cutie Party	Radio host	with Maimi Yajima
2008–2009	Cute Cutie Paradise	Radio host	with Airi Suzuki
