= High-King =

Japanese girl group

- Origin: Japan
- Genres: J-pop
- Years active: 2008, 2009-2011; 2013; 2015
- Label: Zetima
- Spinoff of: Morning Musume; Berryz Kobo; Cute; Hello Pro Egg; Hello! Project
- Past members: Reina Tanaka; Ai Takahashi; Saki Shimizu; Maimi Yajima; Yuuka Maeda
- Website: www.helloproject.com

High-King (ハイ・キング, Hai-Kingu) was a Japanese girl group associated with Hello! Project. The group was created to promote Morning Musume's production of Rodgers and Hammerstein's Cinderella, titled Cinderella the Musical (シンデレラ the ミュージカル). Their sound is said to have an R&B feel.

== History ==
The group's debut single, "C\C (Cinderella\Complex)" (Ｃ＼Ｃ （シンデレラ＼コンプレックス）), was released on June 11, 2008, under the Zetima label in two versions. The regular version contains the CD-single only, while the limited version contains a bonus DVD. The Single V was also released for the song two weeks later, on June 25, 2008.

High-King returned in 2009 along with other shuffle units, releasing two new songs to compilations in 2009, "Diamonds", a cover song and a new original song later in 2009 called "DESTINY LOVE".

High-King ceased activities in September 2011 when Ai Takahashi graduated Morning Musume and Hello! Project, effectively graduating from High-King as well.

In 2013, High-King briefly returned to perform "C/C (Cinderella Complex)" as Ai Takahashi with High-King, making High-King officially a three-member unit with Reina, Saki and Maimi.

In 2015, Saki Shimizu and Maimi Yajima briefly performed during Berryz Kobo Matsuri on February 28 and March 1 as High-King, performing the song "Koiku no Meiro".

== Members ==
- Reina Tanaka (Leader of High King and member of Morning Musume) (graduated May 2013)
- Ai Takahashi (Leader of Morning Musume) (graduated September 2011)
- Saki Shimizu (Leader of Berryz Kobo)
- Maimi Yajima (Leader of Cute)
- Yuuka Maeda (Member of Hello! Pro Egg, and after S/mileage member) (graduated December 2011)

== Discography ==
=== Singles ===
#	Title	Peak rank	Single information
1	C\C (Cinderella\Complex) (Ｃ＼Ｃ （シンデレラ＼コンプレックス）)	#6	Release date: June 11, 2008; June 25, 2008 (Single V); Main vocal(s): Ai Takahashi, Reina Tanaka; Center : Reina Tanaka

== Other Songs ==
2009:

- "Diamonds" (Chanpuru 1 ~Happy Marriage Song Cover Shuu~)
- "DESTINY LOVE" (Petit Best 10)

2010:

- "Daite yo! PLEASE GO ON" (Hello! Project 2010 Summer ~Fankora~)

2011:

- "Scramble" (Hello! Project 2011 Winter ~Kangei Shinsen Matsuri~ A gana Live)
- "SHALL WE LOVE?" (Hello! Project 2011 Winter ~Kangei Shinsen Matsuri~ A gana Live)
