= Hello! Project =

Japanese supergroup

Background information
- Also known as: H.P. All Stars; Hello! Project Mobekimasu
- Origin: Tokyo, Japan
- Genre: J-pop
- Years active: 1998–present
- Label: Up-Front Promotion
- Spinoffs: See list
- Members: See list
- Past members: See list
- Website: www.helloproject.com

Hello! Project (Japanese: ハロー!プロジェクト, Hepburn: Harō! Purojekuto) is a Japanese musical collective consisting of all female recording artists and groups under Up-Front Promotion, a subsidiary of Up-Front Group. The name was initially used as Michiyo Heike and Morning Musume's fan club name in 1999, but has since then been used to represent all female recording artists at Up-Front Promotion. Until 2014, their songs were primarily produced by Tsunku.

Hello! Project's main acts consist of Morning Musume, Angerme, Juice=Juice, Camellia Factory, Beyooooonds, Ocha Norma, and Rosy Chronicle. Notable acts in the past associated with Hello! Project include Aya Matsuura, Maki Goto, Mini-Moni, W, Melon Kinenbi, Berryz Kobo, Cute, Country Girls and Magnolia Factory.

== Artists ==
Yuko Nakazawa was Hello! Project's leader from April 15, 2001 to March 31, 2009. Ai Takahashi became the group's leader from April 1, 2009 to September 30, 2011. Risa Niigaki then became the leader from October 1, 2011 to May 18, 2012. After her departure, Sayumi Michishige became the leader from May 19, 2012 to November 26, 2014. Maimi Yajima was the leader from November 27, 2014 to December 31, 2016. Ayaka Wada was the group's leader from January 1, 2017 to June 18, 2019, with Mizuki Fukumura as sub-leader. Fukumura took over the leader role beginning June 19, 2019. The leader role still vacant after Fukumura's graduation on November 29, 2023.

== History ==
=== 1997–2000: Beginning, Michiyo Heike & Morning Musume ===
In 1997, Japanese rock group Sharam Q, fronted by Tsunku, began auditions for a female vocalist. These auditions aired via the reality show Asayan, and resulted in Michiyo Heike being crowned winner. Tsunku decided to give five of the runners-up, Yuko Nakazawa, Natsumi Abe, Kaori Iida, Asuka Fukuda and Aya Ishiguro, named "Morning Musume", a chance to become a group by selling 50,000 copies of their demo single "Ai no Tane" in just five days. The girls sold the required number of copies in four days, and subsequently became an official group.

Morning Musume's debut single, "Morning Coffee," was released on January 28, 1998 on the One Up Music label and charted at #6 on the Oricon weekly chart. The group's first official appearance was a joint live in August 1998, at Shibuya Public Hall (now Shibuya C.C. Lemon Hall), under the name "Michiyo Heike and Morning Musume," (平家みちよとモーニング娘。) the fan club of the two acts was called "Hello!" The first official "units" were Tanpopo and Petitmoni, created in October 1998. The first "Michiyo Heike & Morning Musume Imotōbun Audition" took place, resulting in the "second generation" of Morning Musume to be added, made up of Sayaka Ichii, Mari Yaguchi and Kei Yasuda.

In January 1999, auditions for Country Musume were held on "Idol o Sagase!" (アイドルをさがせ!, Search For an Idol!). In April of that year the girls' official fan club was renamed "Hello! Project", a name which was later used to represent an enterprise of member-changing girl groups. Auditions were once again held on Asayan between April and July, resulting in Taiyō to Ciscomoon and Coconuts Musume, with Country Musume's official formation announced. In July, the first live concert of Hello! Project, "Hello! Project '99 at Yokohama Arena," was held. The first shuffle units were formed in March 2000, releasing the "theme" of Hello! Project as a B-side. The first Hello! Project television show, "Hello! Morning," was created in April.

=== 2001–2006: Rise to popularity, Berryz Kobo & Cute ===
In March 2001, Morning Musume co-founder and leader Yuko Nakazawa announced her graduation from the group, which took place in April. Nakazawa was subsequently named as leader of the entirety of Hello! Project. Nakazawa's was the first graduation in the history of Hello! Project, and garnered considerable media attention as a result.

==== Hello! Project Kids ====
Between April and June 2002, auditions for Hello! Project Kids were held for girls under 12 years old. Out of 27,958 applicants, fifteen elementary school girls were chosen. After making minor appearances in television, film, and music, Hello! Project Kids later debuted as Berryz Kobo and Cute, who would go on to debut in March 2004 and February 2007 respectively, also spawning offshoot auditions such as auditions for Hello! Pro Egg and Hello! Project Kansai.

=== 2007–2010: Expansion in Asia and Smileage formation ===
In 2007, Hello! Project attempted to expand towards the Chinese market by inviting prospective Chinese artists to audition in secret, eventually resulting in Li Chun and Qian Lin to Morning Musume's roster. Hello! Project also set up an overseas branch in Taiwan, titled Hello! Project Taiwan, and held the "Hello! Project New Star Audition" to recruit members. In September 2008, the group Ice Creamusume was formed under a Taiwanese-affiliated label as Hello! Project's first overseas group. Duo Frances & Aiko, later named Big Small Sister, was also announced from the same audition.

In February 2009, Hello! Project also held a series of auditions in South Korea with cooperation from Mnet. However, Hello! Project failed to break into the Chinese market due to piracy and their Chinese artists failing to draw an audience. Ice Creamusume also performed below expectations. Hello! Project scaled back on initial plans to expand overseas around 2010 and refocused their interests in Japan.

On October 19, 2008, Hello! Project announced its entire Elder Club would be graduating on March 31, 2009. On February 1, 2009, at the Yokohama Arena, Hello! Project held its largest concert ever—the Hello! Pro Awards '09: Elder Club Graduation Special (決定！ハロ☆プロアワード'09 ～エルダークラブ卒業記念スべシャル～, Kettei! Hello Pro Awards '09: Elder Club Sotsugyō Kinen Special)—featuring 21 groups and 72 members. During the concert, former Hello! Project leader Yuko Nakazawa passed her leadership position to Morning Musume leader Ai Takahashi.

Later in 2009, several of the old, dormant units were revived. Tanpopo, Minimoni, Petitmoni, ZYX, Aa! and v-u-den all returned with new line-ups, and High-King returned from hiatus with its original members. These groups became a new concert unit, "Champloo".

In April 2009, Tsunku announced a new group consisting of four Hello! Pro Egg members, named Smileage, who later debuted on a major label in May 2010 with the single "Yume Miru 15".

=== 2011–2014: Line-up and production changes ===
On January 28, 2011, Dream Morning Musume was formed consisting of previous Morning Musume members. On September 30, 2011, Ai Takahashi graduated and handed her position as leader of Morning Musume and Hello! Project over to fellow member Risa Niigaki, who also graduated on May 18, 2012. Sayumi Michishige was later named the group's new leader.

During the last concert of the Winter 2013 Hello! Project concert, Juice=Juice, a new unit consisting of Hello! Pro Kenshusei members was announced, They previewed their debut song at the Hello Project concert series held on March 2–3.

On November 26, 2014, Sayumi Michishige graduated and handed her position as Hello! Project's leader to C-ute's Maimi Yajima.

Tsunku revealed in his 2015 memoir, Dakara, Ikiru that he stepped down as Hello! Project's general manager sometime after Morning Musume's New York concert in 2014; however, he still remains involved with Morning Musume as their sound producer.

=== 2015–Present: Post-Tsunku era ===
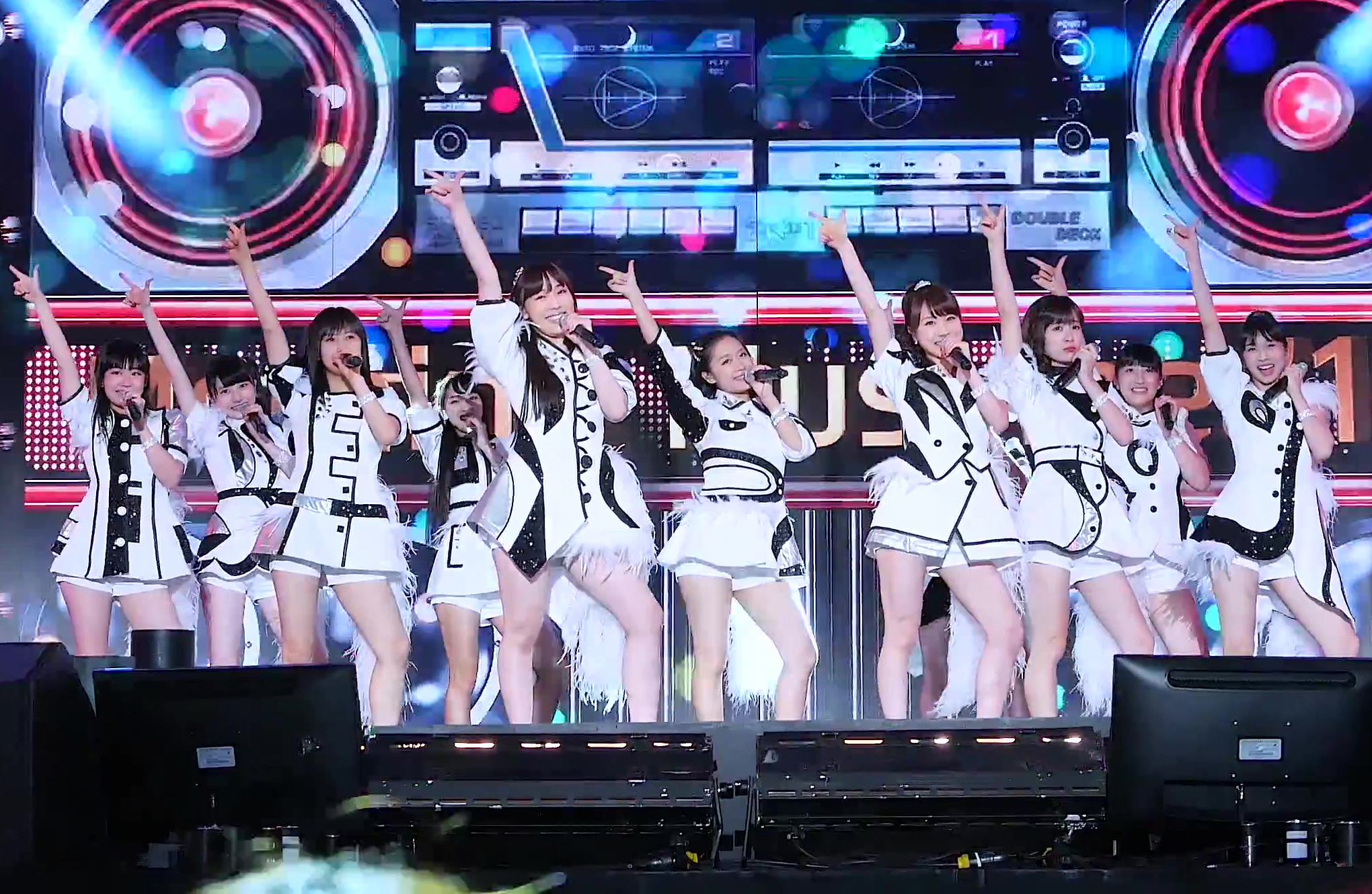
Morning Musume in 2016

On January 2, 2015, during the Hello! Project 2015 winter concert, a new group consisting of Hello Pro Kenshusei members was announced and was named Magnolia Factory. On April 29, 2015, Magnolia Factory's sister group, Camellia Factory was also formed.

On March 3, 2015, Berryz Koubou performed their last concert before their indefinite hiatus, Berryz Koubou Last Concert 2015 Berryz Koubou Ikube!, at Nippon Budokan. They had been a group for 11 years, 1 month, and 17 days and graduated on the 11th anniversary of their debut.

On July 21, 2015, Hello! Project officially opened their first official smartphone app, Hello! Project Mobile or "Hello! Moba" for short. The 400 yen monthly subscription plan allowed users of the app to gain access to exclusive content such as "Hello! Gacha" or the popular Pocket Morning questionnaires. Users with the 700 yen monthly subscription plan could also gain access to "Hello! Radio".

On October 29, 2015, Riho Sayashi announced her graduation from Morning Musume '15 in order to study English and dance abroad, but would stay as a member of Hello! Project. Following her graduation on December 31, she was listed as a Hello! Project solo act.

On July 16, 2016, the formation of a new trainee branch, Hello Pro Kenshuusei Hokkaido, was announced.

On August 20, 2016, °C-ute announced they would disband in June 2017 after a concert at Saitama Super Arena. On November 5, 2016, fellow former Hello! Project Kids member Momoko Tsugunaga announced that she would also retire from entertainment after her graduation in spring 2017.

On December 31, 2016, at the Hello! Project COUNTDOWN PARTY 2016 ~GOOD BYE & HELLO!~, Yajima Maimi announced that ANGERME leader Ayaka Wada would become the new leader of Hello! Project at the start of 2017 with Morning Musume '16 leader Mizuki Fukumura as the first ever sub-leader of Hello! Project. Ayaka Wada is the first former Hello Pro Egg to hold this position.

In March 2017, a new SATOYAMA movement unit named Kamiishinaka Kana was formed.

On May 22, 2017, Buono! held their last performance, Buono! Live 2017 ~Pienezza!~, at Yokohama Arena.

On June 9, 2017, it was announced that Country Girls would change to a new system after Momoko Tsugunaga's departure. The group would become semi-active with three of the group's members joining other Hello! Project groups as concurrent members for their main activities. An announcement video was later uploaded to the Hello! Project Station YouTube channel, revealing the new placements of the transferring Country Girls members and a few promoted Hello Pro Kenshuusei, including a new group led by Reina Ichioka.

On June 12, 2017, °C-ute held their last concert, titled °C-ute Last Concert in Saitama Super Arena ~Thank you team°C-ute~, a day after the 12th anniversary of their formation. A few weeks later, Momoko Tsugunuaga graduated from Country Girls and Hello! Project at the Tsugunaga Momoko Last Live ♥Arigatou Otomomochi♥ on June 30, 2017, the day of Hello! Project Kids' 15th anniversary.

On July 15, 2017, the Hello! Project Shin Member Audition was announced at the Hello! Project 2017 SUMMER ~HELLO! MEETING~ concert and opened for applications on the same day.

On September 8, 2017, Manaka Inaba announced her return to Hello! Project after a year and half long hiatus due to health issues, which resulted in her graduating from her debut group Country Girls during her absence. She would advise Hello Pro Kenshuusei Hokkaido as their new leader, but also pursue individual activities as a Hello! Project solo act.

On October 23, 2017, a new YouTube channel titled tiny tiny was announced to start on October 26. The hosts are Sharam Q's Makoto, who is also known for being the long-time MC of Hello! Project concerts, and Noriko Kato. Each week, an active Hello! Project member or OG member is brought on as a guest to deliver "small pleasures that would unexpectedly become a great source of happiness and brighten the lives of viewers".

On February 28, 2018, an Instagram campaign, titled "Hello Pro here" (or "H!P here"), was announced in order to grow closer with international fans. Fans have been asked to take photos and videos of famous attractions and famous products where they live, while also showing their love for Hello! Project, and to post it on Instagram with the hashtag "#hp_here". Out of all the posts shared, one person will be randomly selected to appear on Hello! Project Station and speak with a member. The campaign also allows fans to promote their cities for concerts to take place there in the future. A month prior to this announcement, fans outside of Japan have also been encouraged to send in questions for Hello! Project Station's MC talk corner.

On May 1, 2018, staff announced that a new web show based on viewer feedback was being planned for summer 2018. It would include future projects with international fans similar to the "#hp_here" campaign on Hello! Project Station. The show, which was later announced as the OMAKE CHANNEL, began on August 1, 2018.

On May 11, 2018, the Hello! Project "ONLY YOU" Audition began, searching for members of a new group led by Reina Ichioka and a second new group including Kurumi Takase and Momohime Kiyono in its line-up.

On October 19, 2018, the two new groups were named CHICA#TETSU and Ame no Mori Kawa Umi, and it was announced that together they would form the combined group named BEYOOOOONDS alongside the Hello! Project "ONLY YOU" Audition winners.

On November 3, 2018, solo talent Aika Mitsui, who had been on hiatus twice since 2013, decided to graduate from Hello! Project and retire from entertainment.

On December 7, 2018, it was announced that another solo talent, Riho Sayashi, who had been on hiatus since she graduated from Morning Musume at the end of 2015, decided to graduate from Hello! Project at the end of November when her exclusive contract with UP-FRONT PROMOTION had ended.

On December 31, 2018, during Hello! Project 20th Anniversary!! Hello! Project COUNTDOWN PARTY 2018 ~GOOD BYE & HELLO!~ first part, Ayaka Wada announced that Mizuki Fukumura would become the new leader of Hello! Project after her graduation.

On December 26, 2019, Country Girls suspended activities.

On March 30, 2020, Kobushi Factory disbanded.

From April 9 to May 6, 2020, all Hello! Project stores were closed due to emergency measures established by the government to prevent the spread of the COVID-19 pandemic.

On May 11, 2020, an official Hello! Project TikTok account opened up, and select songs from the current active groups were made available to use for editing in the app.

On June 15, 2020, after months of concerts and events being cancelled due to the COVID-19 pandemic, UP-FRONT PROMOTION announced their plans for the annual summer concerts. Unlike previous years, these concerts featured the members performing solo covers of J-Pop ballads by artists outside of Hello! Project. In compliance with government policy, cheering, crowding, and closeness in the venue are prohibited, the venues were filled to 50% capacity, and wearing masks was required to enter. They made the decision to hold the concerts despite the pandemic due to the members' desire to stand on stage as soon as possible.

On February 10, 2021, the special compilation album Hello! Project no Zenkyoku kara Atsumechaimashita! Vol.7 was released as part of a seven part series. Unlike the previous six volumes, which were all released in 2014, this volume commemorated the theatrical release of the 2021 film Ano Koro, a movie based on a true story of the life of a Hello! Project fan and the camaraderie that fans form in their passionate support of Hello! Project idols. Ano Koro was released in theaters on February 19, 2021.

On March 12, 2021, the official HELLO! PROJECT STREAM ONLINE STORE website opened. Through the site, fans are able to purchase streaming tickets to access digital video recordings of concerts, events, or other shows featuring Hello! Project or M-line club acts. These recordings are not streamed live, and are available for repeated viewing during a set period of time.

On July 5, 2021, it was revealed at Hello Dream. that the Hello! Project Shin Member Audition 2021 (ハロー！プロジェクト 新メンバーオーディション2021) would start on July 20, 2021, in search of new members to join the new Hello! Project group.

On December 3, 2021 it was announced that the Mokudora 24 drama Mayonaka ni Hello! featuring Hello! Project members would begin broadcasting via TV Tokyo every Thursday starting on January 13, 2022. The drama stars Momoko Kikuchi as an avid Hello! Project fan named Mariko, and Yuno Ohara as Mariko's daughter Misaki, who runs a guesthouse. Hello! Project members would be making appearances in each episode of the drama as guest performers at the guesthouse.

On December 12, 2021, it was announced that the new group would be named OCHA NORMA and two new members from the Hello! Project Shin Member Audition 2021 would join the group.

From June 8 to June 11, 2023, the Hello! Project groups held a special concert as part of the Sayonara Nakano Sunplaza Ongakusai festival at Nakano Sunplaza, with Juice=Juice hosting on June 8, BEYOOOOONDS on June 9, OCHA NORMA & Hello Pro Kenshuusei and Tsubaki Factory on June 10, and ANGERME and Morning Musume '23 on June 11. The festival was held in celebration of the hall's 50 years of history, and also of its closure on July 2.

On January 30, 2024, a new Hello! Project shuffle unit featuring one member of the current six groups was announced as part of a collaboration with the snack company Kasugai Seika for its candy brand Tsubu Gummy. The members of the unit and their representative flavours were revealed from February 2 to 4. The line-up is composed by Morning Musume '24 member Homare Okamura representing grapefruit, ANGERME member Rin Hashisako representing apple, Juice=Juice member Ichika Arisawa representing cider, Tsubaki Factory member Yuumi Kasai representing grape, BEYOOOOONDS / CHICA#TETSU member Shiori Nishida representing peach and OCHA NORMA member Momo Kitahara representing muscat. The unit was also revealed to be named GOODM!X and released the song "Come On, Mix!" digitally on February 14.

== Discography ==
=== Projects ===
- 2000-2005: Hello! Project Shuffle Unit

=== Studio albums ===
- Chanpuru 1: Happy Marriage Song Cover Shu (2009)

=== Compilation albums ===
- Petit Best: Ki-Ao-Aka (2000)
- Petit Best 2: Mi-Nana-Juu (2001)
- Petit Best 3 (2002)
- Petit Best 4 (2003)
- Petit Best 5 (2004)
- Petit Best 6 (2005)
- Petit Best 7 (2006)
- Petit Best 8 (2007)
- Petit Best 9 (2008)
- Hello! Project Special Unit Mega Best (2008)
- Petit Best 10 (2009)
- Petit Best 11 (2010)
- Petit Best 12 (2011)
- Petit Best 13 (2012)
- Petit Best 14 (2013)
- Petit Best 15 (2014)
- Petit Best 16 (2015)
- Petit Best 17 (2016)
- Petit Best 18 (2017)
- Petit Best 19 (2018)
- Petit Best 20 2020 (2020)

=== Singles ===
- "All for One & One for All!" (2004) (as H.P. All Stars)
- "Busu ni Naranai Tetsugaku" (2011) (as Hello! Project Mobekimasu)

== Filmography ==
=== Television ===
Year	Title	Network	Notes
2000-2007	Hello! Morning	TV Tokyo	Morning Musume's variety show
2002-2004	Hello Kids	TV Tokyo	Mini-Moni's variety show
2005	Musume Document 2005	TV Tokyo	Morning Musume's variety show
2005-2006	Musume Dokyu!	TV Tokyo	Morning Musume's variety show
2007-2008	Haromoni	TV Tokyo	Morning Musume's variety show
2008	Berikyū!	TV Tokyo	Berryz Kobo and Cute's variety show
2008	Yorosen!	TV Tokyo	Hello! Project's variety show
2009	Bijo Houdan	TV Tokyo	Hello! Project's variety show
2010	Bijo Gaku	TV Tokyo	Hello! Project's variety show
2011-2012	Hello Pro! Time	TV Tokyo	Hello! Project's variety show
2012-2013	Hello! Satoyama Life	TV Tokyo	Hello! Project's variety show
2014-2019	The Girls Live	TV Tokyo	Up-Front Works's variety show
2019–present	Ai-dol	TV Tokyo	

=== Radio ===
- MBS Young Town Saturday on MBS Radio (the Kansai area)
- HelloPro Yanen! on ABC Radio

=== Internet ===
- Hello! Project Station (2013–)

=== Video games ===
- Tenkuu no Restaurant Hello Project Ver. (March 1, 2001, PlayStation)

=== Theatre ===
- Princess Knight: The Musical (August 1, 2006 – August 27, 2006)
- Cinderella: The Musical (2008)
- Fashionable: The Musical (2010)

=== Sports festivals ===
- Hello! Project Daiundōkai (March 31, 2001 at Saitama Super Arena)
- Hello! Project Daiundōkai (November 3, 2002 at Osaka Dome)
- Hello! Project Sports Festival 2003 (November 16, 2003 at Osaka Dome)
- Hello! Project Sports Festival 2003 (November 22, 2003 at Tokyo Dome)
- Hello! Project Sports Festival 2004 (November 14, 2004 at Toyota Stadium)
- Hello! Project Sports Festival 2004 (December 5, 2004 at Saitama Super Arena)
- Hello! Project Sports Festival 2006 ~Hello!Diva Athlete~ (March 19, 2006 at Saitama Super Arena)

== Concerts ==
Name	Start date	End date	Performances	Release format (date)
1st Concert "Hello!"	July 12, 1998	July 27, 1998	3 in 3 cities	VHS
Hello! Project Happy New Year '99	January 2, 1999	January 3, 1999	2 in 1 cities	VHS
Hello! Project Summer Concert '99	August 14, 1999	August 26, 1999	4 in 3 cities	VHS
Hello! Project Happy New Year 2000	January 2, 2000	January 30, 2000	16 in 3 cities	VHS
Hello! Project 2000 Atsumare! Summer Party	July 15, 2000	September 10, 2000	In 12 cities	VHS
Hello! Project 2001 Sugoizo! Nijū-seiki	January 2, 2001	February 25, 2001	19 in 3 cities	VHS
Hello! Project 2001 Together! Summer Party!	July 14, 2001	July 29, 2001	13 in 3 cities	VHS, DVD
Hello! Project 2002 ~Kotoshi mo Sugoizo~	January 2, 2002	February 17, 2002	28 in 7 cities	VHS, DVD (March 20, 2002)
Hello! Project 2002 ~One Happy Summer Day~	July 13, 2002	July 28, 2002	12 in 3 cities	VHS, DVD (October 17, 2002)
Hello! Project 2003 Winter ~Tanoshinjattemasu!~	January 2, 2003	February 2, 2003	25 in 4 cities	VHS, DVD (March 19, 2003)
Hello! Project 2003 Summer ~Yosha! Bikkuri Summer!!~	July 19, 2003	July 27, 2003	12 in 3 cities	VHS, DVD (October 8, 2003)
Hello! Project 2004 Winter ~C'mon! Dance World~	January 3, 2004	January 25, 2004	23 in 4 cities	DVD (March 17, 2004)
Hello! Project 2004 Summer ~Natsu no Dōn!~	July 17, 2004	August 1, 2004	12 in 3 cities	DVD (October 6, 2004)
Hello! Project 2005 Winter All Stars Dairanbu; ~A Happy New Power! Kaori Iida Graduation Special~: Hello! Project 2005 Winter ~A Happy New Power! Akagumi~; Hello! Project 2005 Winter ~A Happy New Power! Shirogumi~	January 29, 2005: January 3, 2005; January 4, 2005	January 30, 2005: January 23, 2005; January 23, 2005	2 in Yokohama: 9 in 3 cities; 9 in 3 cities	DVD (March 16, 2005)
Hello! Project 2005 Natsu no Kayō Show ~'05 Selection Collection!~	July 10, 2005	July 24, 2005	8 in 3 cities	DVD (October 5, 2005)
Hello! Project 2006 Winter ~Zeninshū Go!~: Hello! Project Winter 2006 ~Elder Club~; Hello! Project Winter 2006 ~Wonderful Hearts~	January 28, 2006: January 2, 2006; January 2, 2006	January 29, 2006: January 22, 2006; January 21, 2006	2 in Yokohama: 14 in 3 cities; 14 in 3 cities	DVD (cancelled original release: March 29, 2006. Released later as a fan club item on December 20, 2008)
Hello! Project 2006 Summer ~Wonderful Hearts Land~	July 9, 2006	July 23, 2006	7 in 3 cities	DVD (October 4, 2006)
Hello! Project 2007 Winter Shūketsu! 10th Anniversary: Hello! Project Winter 2007 ~Elder Club The Celebration~; Hello! Project Winter 2007 ~Wonderful Hearts Otome Gokoro~	January 27, 2007: January 5, 2007; January 2, 2007	January 28, 2007: January 20, 2007; January 21, 2007	3 in Yokohama: 11 in 3 cities; 11 in 3 cities	DVD (4-disc DVD set including footage from the three concerts and backstage, Winter Shūketsu! 10th Anniversary: March 28, 2007)
Hello! Project 2007 Summer 10th Anniversary Dai Kanshasai; ~Hello☆Pro Natsu Matsuri!~	July 15, 2007	July 29, 2007	11 in 3 cities	DVD (October 16, 2007)
Hello! Project 2008 Winter ~Kettei! Hello☆Pro Awards '08~: Hello! Project 2008 Winter ~Kashimashi Elder Club~; Hello! Project 2008 Winter ~Wonderful Hearts Nenjū Mukyū~	January 26, 2008: January 5, 2008; January 2, 2008	January 27, 2008: January 19, 2008; January 20, 2008	3 in Yokohama: 9 in 3 cities; 11 in 3 cities	DVD (Kettei! Hello☆Pro Awards '08, Kashimashi Elder Club, Wonderful Hearts Nenjū Mukyū: March 26, 2008)
Hello! Project 2008 Summer Wonderful Hearts Kōen; ~Hishochi de Date Itashima Show~	July 19, 2008	August 3, 2008	11 in 3 cities	DVD (October 22, 2008)
Hello! Project 2009 Winter; Kettei! Hello☆Pro Awards '09 ~Elder Club Graduation Special~: Hello! Project 2009 Winter Elder Club Kōen ~Thank You For Your Love!~; Hello! Project 2009 Winter Wonderful Hearts Kōen ~Kakumei Gannen~	January 31, 2009: January 10, 2009; January 2, 2009	February 2, 2009: January 25, 2009; January 18, 2009	3 in Yokohama: 9 in 3 cities; 11 in 3 cities	DVD (Thank You For Your Love!, Kakumei Gannen: March 25, 2009, Kettei! Hello☆Pro Awards '09 ~Elder Club Graduation Special: April 15, 2009)
Hello! Project 2009 Summer Kakumei Gannen ~Hello! Champloo~	July 19, 2009	August 3, 2009	12 in 3 cities	DVD (November 14, 2009)
Hello! Project 2010 Winter Kachō Fūgetsu ~Shuffle Date~: Hello! Project 2010 Winter Kachō Fūgetsu ~Mobekimasu!~	January 5, 2010: January 2, 2010	January 24, 2010: January 23, 2010	8 in 3 cities: 14 in 3 cities	DVD (Shuffle Date: March 31, 2010, Mobekimasu: April 8, 2010), Blu-ray Disc (Shuffle Date and Mobekimasu: August 4, 2010)
Hello! Project 2010 Summer ~Fankora!~	July 18, 2010	August 8, 2010	13 in 4 cities	DVD (October 27, 2010), Blu-ray Disc (December 15, 2010)
Hello! Project 2011 Winter ~Kangei Shinsen Matsuri~	January 2, 2011	January 23, 2011	20 in 3 cities	DVD (A Gana Live, B Kkuri Live: April 27, 2011), Blu-ray Disc (a Full Edition: May 18, 2011)
Hello! Project 2011 Summer ~Nippon no Mirai wa~	July 16, 2011	August 14, 2011	18 in 3 cities	DVD (Wow Wow Live, Yeah Yeah Live: November 16, 2011), Blu-ray Disc (a Full Edition: December 14, 2012)
Hello! Project 2012 Winter ~Hello☆Pro Tengoku~	January 2, 2012	January 22, 2012	19 in 3 cities	DVD (Rock Zzang, Punky Zzang: April 11, 2012), Blu-ray Disc (a Full Edition: May 16, 2012)
Hello! Project Tanjou 15th Anniversary Live 2012 Summer	July 21, 2011	August 19, 2011	18 in 3 cities	DVD (Ktkr, Wkwk: November 14, 2012), Blu-ray Disc (a Full Edition: December 5, 2012)
Hello! Project Tanjou 15th Anniversary Live 2013 Winter	January 2, 2013	February 3, 2013	24 in 4 cities	

== See also ==
- Gatas Brilhantes H.P., Hello! Project's futsal team
