= Maimi Yajima =

Japanese singer and actress (born 1992)

- 矢島 舞美
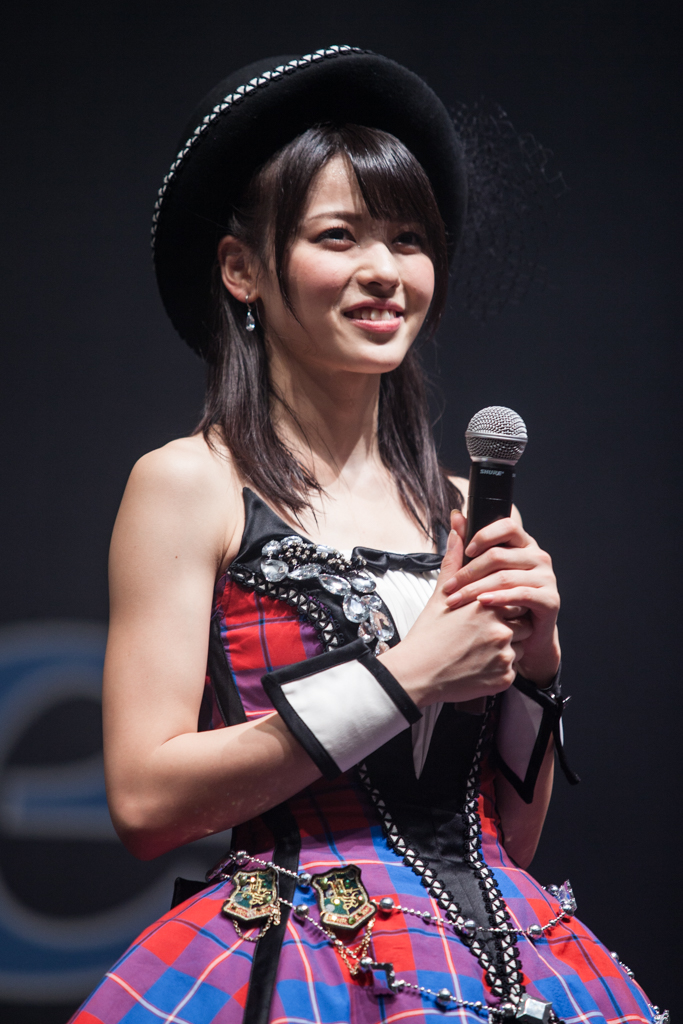
- Maimi Yajima at Japan Expo 2014
- Born: February 7, 1992 (age 34); Saitama Prefecture, Japan
- Other names: Maimii, Yassui
- Occupations: Singer; actress
- Spouse: Ryosuke Mikata (m. 2022)
- Relatives: Akari Takeuchi (younger cousin)
- Musical career
- Genres: J-pop
- Years active: 2002–present
- Label: Zetima
- Formerly of: Cute; Hello! Project Kids; ZYX; H.P. All Stars; High-King
- Website: helloproject.com

Maimi Yajima (矢島 舞美, Yajima Maimi; born February 7, 1992) is a Japanese singer and actress. She was a member and the leader of Cute, a girl idol group within Hello! Project.

== Career ==
Yajima first joined Hello! Project in 2002 as one of the fifteen children chosen from the Hello! Project Kids auditions after performing "Momoiro Kataomoi" by Aya Matsuura. She debuted the same year in the movie Koinu Dan no Monogatari, taking on one of the main roles as an antagonist. The following year, she joined the first of the kids' groups, ZYX, which released two singles.

In 2004, Berryz Kobo was formed, with the intention of rotating the girls throughout the unit. Yajima did not make the original pick, and the idea was eventually dropped. The remaining girls eventually ended up forming Cute in 2005. Despite not being the oldest, Yajima still became the group's leader, after Erika Umeda turned down the role. The group did not make its official debut until late in 2006, with their first official single released in February 2007.

Aside from leading Cute, Yajima became the sub-captain of Little Gatas and the Hello! Project Kids futsal team.

Yajima also co-hosted Cute's weekly radio program, Cutie Party. She took over the role when Megumi Murakami left the group.

In 2008, Yajima was selected to be a member of Hello Project's new unit High-King. Yajima and Fukuda Kanon appeared in the movie Fuyu no Kaidan (Winter Ghost Story), released in Japan on May 23, 2009.

Cute disbanded following their final concert at Saitama Super Arena on June 12, 2017. Yajima had announced earlier, via the group's blog, that she planned to pursue an acting career.

== Personal life ==
Maimi's younger cousin, Akari Takeuchi, is a former member of ANGERME, another girl group within Hello! Project.

On November 8, 2022, she announced her marriage with actor Ryosuke Mikata. On March 25, 2024, she announced her first pregnancy. She gave birth to her first baby in July of the same year, and announced her second pregnancy in June 2025, and gave birth to her second baby in November 2025.

== Discography ==
=== Solo DVDs ===
No.	Title	Release date	Chart position	Label
No.	Title	Release date	Oricon Weekly DVD Chart	Label
1	17's (Seventeen's) (17's-SEVENTEEN'S-)	April 29, 2009	35	Zetima
–	UTB Wani Books Online Store Gentei Tokuten "Yajima Maimi Making DVD" (UTB ワニブックス オンラインストア限定特典 「矢島舞美 メイキングDVD」)	June 2009	—	Wani Books (not for sale)
2	Yajima Maimi Fix no E (矢島舞美 Fixの絵)	June 23, 2010	80	Zetima
3	Yajima Maimi DVD "Umikaze" (矢島舞美DVD「海風」; "Yajima Maimi DVD "Sea Breeze"")	March 27, 2011	—	Up-Front Works (e-Hello! series)
4	A Foggy Doll (a foggy doll)	August 29, 2011	—	Up-Front Works (e-Hello! series)
5	A Rainy Day (a rainy day)	September 29, 2011	—	Up-Front Works (e-Hello! series)
6	Imagine Classic (Imagine classic)	November 11, 2011	—	Up-Front Works (e-Hello! series)
–	Yajima Maimi Shashinshū "Tabioto" Making DVD (矢島舞美写真集「タビオト」メイキングDVD)	January 31, 2012	—	Up-Front Works (e-Hello! series)
7	Chelsie	December 19, 2012	141	Zetima
	Maimiuseum Special DVD (マイミュージアム スペシャルDVD)	June 5, 2013	—	Up-Front Works (e-Hello! series)
	Blue Wind	April 9, 2014	47	Zetima

=== Duet singles ===
Year	Artist	Title	Release date	Chart position
Year	Artist	Title	Release date	Oricon Weekly Single Chart
2008	Abe Natsumi & Yajima Maimi (Cute) (安倍なつみ＆矢島舞美（°C－ｕｔｅ）)	"16sai no Koi Nante" (16歳の恋なんて, Jūrokusai no Koi Nante)	January 16, 2008	9

== Bibliography ==
=== Photobooks ===
No.	Title	Release date	Publisher	ISBN	Notes
1	Maimi (舞美)	April 25, 2007	Wani Books	ISBN 978-4-8470-4003-0	1st solo photobook
2	Sō Sora (爽・空 （そうそら）; "Clear•Sky")	January 27, 2008	Wani Books	ISBN 978-4-8470-4065-8	2nd solo photobook
3	17	April 18, 2009	Wani Books	ISBN 978-4-8470-4169-3	3rd solo photobook
4	Yajima Maimi Shashinkan 2008–2010 (矢島舞美写真館 2008–2010)	June 5, 2010	Wani Books	ISBN 978-4-8470-4285-0	
5	Tabioto (タビオト)	November 27, 2011	Wani Books	ISBN 978-4-8470-4409-0	
6	Hatachi (ハタチ)	November 27, 2012	Wani Books	ISBN 978-4-8470-4509-7	
7	Maimiuseum (マイミュージアム)	May 27, 2013	Wani Books	ISBN 978-4-8470-4546-2	

== Appearances ==
=== Movies ===
- Koinu Dan no Monogatari (仔犬ダンの物語; "Puppy Dan's Story")
- Fuyu no Kaidan: Boku to Watashi to Obāchan no Motogatari (冬の怪談〜ぼくとワタシとおばあちゃんの物語〜; "Winter Ghost Story: You, Me, and Grandma's Story") (2009)
- Ōsama Game (December 17, 2011)
- Zomvideo (ゾンビデオ) (December 29, 2012)
- First Love (2019)
- BLACKFOX: Age of the Ninja (2019)

==== Straight-to-video ====
- Black Angels (ブラック・エンジェルズ) (April 27, 2011, Geneon Universal Entertainment) as Reira
- Black Angels 2 (ブラック・エンジェルズ2〜黒木覚醒編〜) (July 4, 2012)
- Black Angels 3 (ブラック・エンジェルズ3〜黒木死闘編〜) (August 3, 2012)

=== TV dramas ===
- Sūgaku Joshi Gakuen (January 11, 2012 – March 28, 2012)
- Mannequin Girls (マネキン・ガールズ) (2011)

=== Television ===
- Chikyū Seibā: Yume no Gijutsu de Mirai o Sukue! (地球セイバー 夢の技術で未来を救え!; "Earth Saver: Save the Future with the Art of Dreams!") (May 3, 2005)
- °C-ute Has Come #03 (December 2, 2006)
- °C-ute Has Come #04 (December 16, 2006)
- 58th NHK Kōhaku Uta Gassen (December 31, 2007)
- Ahoya nen! Sukiya nen! (あほやねん!すきやねん!) (NHK Osaka, April 21, 2009)
- Bijo Hōdan (美女放談; "Beautiful Girls Chat Show") (June 26, 2009) — a talk show featuring Hello! Project members
- Piramekiino G (ピラメキーノG; "Zakkuri Senshi Piramekid" corner)
- Bijo Gaku (美女学)
- Hello Pro! Time (ハロプロ！ＴＩＭＥ)
- Hello! Satoyama Life (ハロー！ＳＡＴＯＹＡＭＡライフ)

=== Radio ===
- Cutie Party (November 4, 2006 – ongoing)
- °C-ute Maimi Yajima's I My Me Maimi~ (°C-ute矢島舞美のI My Me まいみ〜) (July 4, 2008 – ongoing, Fridays at 10 pm, FM Port)

=== Internet ===
- Hello! ga Ippai #01 (November 10, 2006)
- Hello! ga Ippai #02 (November 24, 2006)
- Hello! Pro Hour #02 (March 17, 2006)
- Michishige Sayumi no "Mobekimasutte Nani??" (道重さゆみの『モベキマスってなに？？』) (2011)
- Hagiwara Mai Desu ga... Nani ka? (2012)

=== Theater ===
- Cat's Eye (2012) as Hitomi Kisugi
- Hatagumi Vol.3 "Ran" (2010) as Ran
- Hatagumi Vol.4 "Ran―2011New version!!" (2011) as Ran
- Hatagumi Vol.5 "Taklamakan" (2013) as Kei
