= Inazuma Eleven (TV series) =

Japanese anime television series

- Cover of the first DVD compilation of Inazuma Eleven released by Geneon Entertainment
- Based on: Inazuma Eleven by Level-5
- Directed by: Katsuhito Akiyama
- Composer: Yasunori Mitsuda
- Country of origin: Japan
- Original language: Japanese
- No. of seasons: 3
- No. of episodes: 127

Production
- Production companies: TV Tokyo; Dentsu; OLM, Inc.

Original release
- Network: TXN (TV Tokyo)
- Release: October 5, 2008 – April 27, 2011

Related
- Inazuma Eleven GO; Inazuma Eleven: Ares; Inazuma Eleven: Orion no Kokuin

Inazuma Eleven is a Japanese animation television series based on Level-5's video game series of the same name. The animated series was produced by OLM under the direction of Katsuhito Akiyama and consists of 127 episodes.

The series aired on the TV Tokyo network from October 5, 2008, until April 27, 2011. The series was produced by Level-5 in conjunction with TV Tokyo and OLM.

The first 26 episodes were formerly available in the United States on Hulu. The first three episodes were also formerly able to be freely viewed via the Nintendo 3DS eShop, which were released alongside the North American release of the first video game.

== Music ==
Thirteen pieces of theme music are used through the entire series—six opening themes performed by T-Pistonz+KMC and seven closing themes. The opening theme for the first 26 episodes is "Tachiagari-yo". For episodes 27 to 54, the opening theme is "Maji de Kansha!". "Tsunagari-yo" is the opening theme for episodes 55 to 67. The opening theme for episodes 68 through 87 is "Katte Nakou ze!". The opening theme for episodes 88 to 107 is "GOOD Kita!". And the final opening theme starting from episode 108 is "Bokura no Goal!". The closing theme for the first 26 episodes is "Seishun Oden" performed by Twel'v. The next five closing themes were performed by Berryz Kobo, the first "Seishun Bus Guide" was the closing theme for episodes 27 to 50. Episodes 51 to 67's closing theme is "Ryūsei Boy". For episodes 68 through 87, the closing theme is "Otakebi Boy WAO!". "Maji Bomber!!" is the closing theme for episodes 88 to 101, and "Shining Power" is the closing theme for episodes 102 to 112. The final closing theme from episode 113 to the end of the series is "Mata ne... no Kisetsu" and was performed by Inazuma All Stars, consisting of Junko Takeuchi, Yuka Nishigaki, Hiroyuki Yoshino, Hirofumi Nojima, and Mamoru Miyano.

The anime also features a score by Yasunori Mitsuda, who rearranged many of the tracks from the original game.

== Broadcast and ratings ==
The series was first broadcast on TV Tokyo in Japan between October 5, 2008, and April 27, 2011. Inazuma Eleven first appeared in Video Research's top ten anime series during the week of December 29, 2008, to January 4, 2009, when episode 14, "The Legendary Eleven!" (伝説のイレブン!, "Densetsu no Irebun!") received a 4.0 share. Its viewers ratings peaked during the week of July 5–11, 2010 when episode 90, "Teikoku's Curse! (Part 1)" (帝国の呪縛!前編!!, "Teikoku no Jubaku! Zenpen!!"), received a 6.2 share. By the final episode, "Kick-off to Tomorrow!" (明日へのキックオフ!, "Ashita e no Kikkuofu!"), the view share was 4.8.

A second series, Inazuma Eleven GO (イナズマイレブンGO), immediately followed the first series and was broadcast between May 4, 2011, and April 11, 2012. A third series, Inazuma Eleven GO: Chrono Stone (イナズマイレブンGO クロノ・ストーン) began airing on April 18, 2012. Inazuma Eleven GO:Galaxy (イナズマイレブンGO ギャラクシー) began airing on May 8, 2013, immediately following Inazuma Eleven GO: Chrono Stone.

== Home media ==
Twenty-eight DVD compilations of three to four episodes each were released by Geneon Entertainment. The first compilation was released on January 23, 2009.

== Episodes ==
=== Season 1 (2008–2009) ===
| No. | English title (Translated title) | Original release date | English air date |
|---|---|---|---|
| 1 | "Let's Play Soccer!"; Transliteration: "Sakkā Yarou ze!" (Japanese: サッカーやろうぜ!) | October 5, 2008 | July 25, 2011; January 2, 2017 (South Africa) |
The episode begins with a destructive sure-kill shoot to the goal and Yuto Kidou disbanding an unknown school's soccer club before destroying the school. In Inazuma City, Tokyo, at Raimon Jr. High, Mamoru Endou, the soccer club's goalkeeper and captain, is trying to convince the other six members of the club (Ryugo Someoka, Heigorou Kabeyama, Teppei Kurimatsu, Shin'ichi Handa, Ayumu "Shourin" Shourinji and Sakichi Shishido) to practice. Despite him reminding them of their dream of joining the Football Frontier, a national tournament for Japanese school teams, no one feels motivated to train and they all give excuses. Aki Kino, the team's manager, offers to try and convince them, but Endou goes to the riverbank alone to practice instead. In the afternoon, when Endou practices at the riverbank with some children, one of the children is showing off his sure-kill shoot, which almost hits one of two punks who are passing by. Endou apologizes and asks the punks to return the ball, but the request is cut when one of the punks kicks Endou's stomach and the other insults him for being in a weak team. Not soon later, he spits and kicks the ball, which heads straight for a small girl. Suddenly, a mysterious boy runs in and kicks the soccer ball back rolling at the punk's face. Evans asks the boy to join the Raimon soccer team but the boy ignores him and leaves. The next day, the mysterious boy enrolls in Raimon Jr. High as a transfer student from Kidokawa Seishuu Junior high, and is introduced as Shuya Gouenji. Endou is called to the principal's office, where he is told by the principal and by the school founder's daughter, Natsumi Raimon, that Teikoku Academy, the undefeated winner of the Football Frontier for the last forty years, wants to have a friendly match with Raimon; if Raimon loses, their soccer club will be disbanded. Endou, left with no other choice but to find four more players to fill out his team, goes around the school to try and recruit new members. He invites those who were interested in entering the club to the place where he practices. A member of the Raimon athletics club, Ichirouta Kazemaru, considers the offer and joins Endou in his training, during which he comments about owning a notebook from his late grandfather Daisuke Endou, written in a script only Endou can understand, and containing many techniques from Daisuke's own career as a soccer player. Moved by Endou's dedication to the sport, Kazemaru joins the soccer team. In the meantime, three other students also join: Kusuke "Max" Matsuno, Jin Kageno, and Kakeru Megane (even though Megane has no athletic talents whatsoever and demands to be the ace striker). Endou asks Gouenji, but he refuses on the grounds that he has stopped playing soccer, and doesn't reveal why. The day of the match between Teikoku and Raimon finally arrives. All of Teikoku's members are skillful and terrifying. Will Raimon be able to win the match, or will their club be disbanded?
| 2 | "Teikoku is Here!"; Transliteration: "Teikoku ga Kita!" (Japanese: 帝国が来た!) | October 12, 2008 | July 26, 2011 January 3, 2017 (South Africa) |
While watching Royals warm up, Jack gets scared and excuses himself to go to the washroom. Since he doesn't come back, Evans and the others quickly look for him, only to find that he managed to get himself trapped in a locker. Jude sharp, Royals Academy's captain, is asked by a teammate of why they're having a practice match with such a weak team, and he answers that something interesting will happen while looking at the direction where Blaze is at. After some encouragement from Evans, Jack and the rest of Raimon return to the field and the match starts. Raimon fares badly during the first half of the match and is completely at the mercy of Royals's normal shots, ending it with a score of 10-0. The reason for Royals requesting the match was that their leader, Jude Sharp, wanted to observe Blaze's current skill level; since Blaze is not participating, Sharp orders Kidou and the others to bring him out by any means necessary. In the second half of the match, Evans refuses to give up even though he is badly injured, so Kidou and his teammates brutally attack him with their sure-kill techniques, which include the Death Zone and the Hundred-Extreme Shot. Sharp threatens that if Blaze does not play in the match, then he will obliterate the last person standing (which is Evans). From the principal's office, Nelly notices that Royals have something up their sleeve and must be waiting for something to happen. Looking at the miserable state of his teammates, Willy flees cowardly crying away from the pitch and takes off his t-shirt, unintentionally dropping it in front of Blaze. Blaze picks up the t-shirt and joins the game, with the intent of stopping Kidou from attacking Evans further. Evans is delighted to see Blaze play and rushes to greet him, only to collapse and be caught by Blaze. Knowing that Blaze believes in him, Evans finally manages to stop the Death Zone using a sure-kill technique of his own; a police detective named Inspector Smith, who watches the match from afar, recognizes the move as one of David Evans's techniques, the God Hand.Evans throws the ball to Blaze, who then scores using his own technique, the Fire Tornado. Having seen all that they need of Blaze's power, Royals forfeits, which means that Raimon wins the match by default. Evans welcomes Blaze into the team, but Blaze still refuses to join and hands his shirt to Evans. Respecting Blaze's decision, Evans thanks him and diverts everyone's attention to their very first goal, telling them that this is Raimon's first step to their future.
| 3 | "Call Out the Sure-Kill Technique!"; Transliteration: "Amidase Hissatsu-waza!" (Japanese: あみだせ必殺技!) | October 19, 2008 | July 27, 2011 January 4, 2016 (South Africa) |
The team is still on a high from their surprise win against Royals Academy, but there is a lot of work they still need to do. They discover that their next game will be against the Okaruto team, which is said to be cursed. Nelly strikes a bargain with Evans and says that if the team wins against Okaruto, she will get the school to enter them in the Football Frontier and if they lose, the soccer team will be disbanded. The other team members are excited, but believe that they will not be able to do well without Blaze, which angers Kevin. At the principal's office, the principal is looking at a paper with blood stains on it and asks Nelly if she told the team about the conditions of the challenge. She asks if there's a need to. The principal then reads the paper that came from Okaruto, saying that if they don't accept the challenge, they will be cursed. Suguru Fuyukai, Raimon's coach, asks if this is true and Nelly tells them both that Okaruto is a school surrounded in rumors and that makes them an interesting opponent. Raimon practices at the riverbank, where Kevin is doing some rough plays and even making fouls. Haruna Otonashi, a member of the school's newspaper club, then greets Aki and tells her that she became a fan of Raimon and went there to watch them practice. Otonashi finds out that their next opponent is Okaruto and instantly gets scared. She then tells everyone the frightening rumors surrounding Okaruto, which includes having their opponent catch a high fever three days after the match, having gusts of wind blow upon on them, and having their legs stop when making a goal. The first years talk about needing Blaze, which irritates Kevin Evans tells them that if they keep relying on others they won't get stronger and so they resume practice. Later that day, Evans still continues to practice at the Steel Plaza where Kazemaru joins him. They talk about how Blaze left an impression on the team, making Kazemaru think he doesn't want to lose to him, and Evans decides that he won't ask Blaze to be part of the team anymore since he wants the team to get stronger with the current members. The next day, Evans sees Blaze going to the hospital and decides to follow him, thinking that he is injured and that's the reason why he stopped playing soccer. When he bumps into him, Evans apologizes for following him and sees that the sign reads Julia Blaze. He asks who is in the room and Blaze tells him that she's his little sister. Inside the hospital room, Blaze tells Evans that Julia has been in a coma since last year, when she was involved in a car accident whilst going to see one of his games. Because of this, he promised that he would not play soccer until she wakes up, though he broke his promise in the game against Royals. Evans apologizes again, this time for insisting he should join Raimon. The next day, Otonashi is introduced to the team by Aki as their new manager. Jealous of Blaze for scoring the only point in their game against Royals, Kevin starts his special training. Evans watches him and, after hearing his friend say he would like to play more like Blaze, states that he has his own style, which gives Kevin more energy to continue training. During practice, Kevin creates a new sure-kill technique for himself, the Dragon Crash. At the same time, Kevin observes the training from the bridge when Nelly drives past and tells him that she did some research about his life and discovered what had happened to his sister. Nelly leaves, telling him to remember who liked to see him play soccer the most and to think if he is making her happy with his promise. Blaze then goes to the field and announces that he will join the team. This makes Evans happy.
| 4 | "Here Comes the Dragon!"; Transliteration: "Doragon ga Deta!" (Japanese: ドラゴンが出た!) | October 26, 2008 | July 28, 2011 January 5, 2017 (South Africa) |
It is game day for Raimon as they are playing against a team that is supposedly cursed – Okaruto. Blaze is now officially part of the team, which Kevin is not happy about. When Okaruto arrives, their coach makes it clear that he is only interested in Blaze, much to the annoyance of Kevin, who states that Okaruto's opponent isn't just Kevin but the entire team. Kevin manages to score quickly with his sure-kill shoot, the Dragon Crash, giving Raimon the first point. Kevin scores the second point the same way, much to the annoyance of Okaruto. Okaruto begin their counterattack and the coach starts to utter a strange incantation. Their captain, Hiroyuki Yuukoku, initiates a technique called Ghost Lock, which causes Raimon to be unable to move, enabling Okaruto to easily score a point using their Phantom Shoot. Raimon tries to score another point, but are stopped by Okaruto's goalkeeper who uses Warp Space. Okaruto uses Ghost Lock once again to score another point, making the score 2-2, and then 2-3. During half time, Evans thinks about the Okaruto's coach's strange incantation and wonders if it has something to do with Ghost Lock. During the match, Evans studies Ghost Lock carefully and figures out the meaning of the chant. He quickly counters the 'curse' by shouting 'rumble rumble rumble break', which frees everyone from Ghost Lock. He blocks the next attack with his new sure-kill move, the Fireball Knuckle. After Evans and Megane explain that Ghost Lock was an audio-visual hypnosis, Evans throws the ball to Someoka. Blaze realizes that the reason why no one can score is because Okaruto's goalkeeper uses another hypnosis trick. Knowing this, Kevin uses Dragon Crash to pass the ball to Blaze, who scores using Fire Tornado. This new combo technique is dubbed Dragon Tornado by Willy.
| 5 | "Where's the Secret Technique Manual?!"; Transliteration: "Hiden-sho wa doko da!" (Japanese: 秘伝書はどこだ!) | November 2, 2008 | July 29, 2011 January 6, 2017 (South Africa) |
At the Football Frontier team selection, it is revealed that Raimon's first opponent is Wild Jr. High. At the soccer club, everyone is introduced to the new transfer student, Bobby Domon, who wants to join the team. He and Aki confirm that they know each other. Evans welcomes him eagerly and claims that they're going to win the Football Frontier, but Domon warns him that Wild have very good jumping abilities. Evans dismisses his warning by saying that they have many powerful shoots, but Domon still insists that Wild could beat them with their jumping ability and intercept any of their sure-kill techniques. Evans decides that the answer to their problem is to create a new sure-kill technique. During their practice, the team's driver, Furukabu, interrupts them and talks to them about the legendary Inazuma Eleven, whose coach was Evans's grandfather. Fuyukai is seen talking to Kageyama through his cell phone and saying that there's no doubt that they'll lose against Wild. Later that day, Evans talks to his mother about his grandfather but receives an "I don't know" as the only response. His father explains to him, in his room, how his mother believes that soccer brought harm to David and then pats his shoulder thrice. He tells Evans before leaving his room that even though he does not know much about soccer, he knows that sports is good for boys his age. The next day, they continue their practice, but no one seems able to come up with a technique. After visiting a noodle shop called Rairaiken and getting a clue about David Evans's secret notebook from the boss of the restaurant, Evans and the others start to look for it. Nelly manages to locate the notebook for them, although no one apart from Evans can read it. Evans reads out the description for a sure-kill technique called Inazuma Drop, although no one can understand the description. During practice, Blaze figures out what the description meant, and Evans decides to pair Blaze and Jack together for the new technique. They start their special training.
| 6 | "This is the Inazuma Drop!"; Transliteration: "Kore ga Inazuma Otoshi da!" (Japanese: これがイナズマ落としだ!) | November 9, 2008 | August 1, 2011; January 9, 2017 (South Africa) |
The episode starts with Jack and Blaze practicing their jumps to master the Inazuma Drop. After Evans and Aki's observation, Kabeyama has problems with his landing yet Blaze lands perfectly. Now, all they need to do is coordinate. After the first try, Jack states that he is scared of heights, which caused him to have problems with his landing. Aki suggests having him look at Blaze so he wouldn't look down. Jack gives another try but still looks down. Nelly appears and assumes that the work she had gone through finding the secret manual was a waste of time. Evans argues that he has trust in Blaze and Jack that they will master the Inazuma Drop and finds a special training that suits Jack. After a series of trials, the team finally begins their usual practice except for Bobby, who states that he'll take it easy for a bit since he is a newcomer. Blaze and Jack practice their coordination for the Inazuma Drop but keep failing, since Jack keeps looking down, causing Blazr to lose balance. At the end of practice, Jack walks to the Inazuma Tower Plaza where he sees Blaze training with Evans. The next day, Raimon arrives at Wild Jr. High and sees three fans cheering for them: Sam Kabeyama (Jack's younger brother) and two of his friends. Jack then gets discouraged due to his brother boasting about Jack's team defeating Royals. The team goes on the field and starts the kickoff. Blaze starts with Fire Tornado but the ball gets stolen by Wild's captain, Ryouta Torii. That's when Raimon realizes the opponent's jump power. Wild counterattacks and shoots with Condor Dive and Tarzan Kick. Evans uses Hot-Blooded Punch to deflect the ball. The ball goes to Kevin, but Shishiou, a defender for Nose, tackles him and gives him a leg injury. Therefore, Raimon switches Kevin to Bobby, then makes Jack a forward. Jack and Blaze try the Inazuma Drop but lose balance. The whistle blows and half time is up. Due to the strong attacks with no end, Evans ends up getting his hands sore but still refuses to give up. The defenders know they can't let Evans protect the goal in his condition so they, too, help protect the goal from Wild's powerful shots. After a while, Jack notices that his teammates are tired and exhausted but still won't give up, so he decides to try the Inazuma Drop again. This time Jack turns his back towards the ground, whilst Blaze steps on his belly, and together they score a point with the Inazuma Drop. The whistle blows and Raimon wins 1-0. The episode ends with Royals's commander talking in the phone.
| 7 | "Duel at the Riverbank!"; Transliteration: "Kasenshiki no Kettō!" (Japanese: 河川敷の決闘!) | November 16, 2008 | August 2, 2011; January 10, 2017 (South Africa) |
The episode starts with the simulation training of Mikage Sennou's soccer team; they are getting data from Raimon to ensure their victory in their upcoming match. Later on the day, Raimon is training at the riverbank, where they spot whom they think are their fans on the bridge. Endou tells everyone to show them their sure-kill techniques. Then, Natsumi's car drives to the field and Natsumi says that practicing their techniques is forbidden. Endou asks why they can't, wherein Natsumi answers that those are not fans but actually spies, causing everyone to be shocked. That night, Mikage Sennou's captain and forward, Takeshi Sugimori and Arata Shimozuru, speak with Kidou. The next day, Sugimori and Arata are spying on Raimon. They find out that they aren't using their sure-kill techniques and ask why. Later on, Endou challenges them to a match. The match starts and Arata uses Fire Tornado, shocking everyone. Endou uses Hot-Blooded Punch but fails to block it. Later, Gouenji uses his own Fire Tornado against Sugimori, but he stops it with his Shoot Pocket, which Raimon is also shocked about. Later, Natsumi leads them to the secret Inabikari Training Center, once used by the original Inazuma Eleven, to show everyone that they can do better training there. After the training everyone is exhausted, but Endou says that they should train every day in the secret training facility. Domon says he doesn't want to go back to the training facility, but still ends up going back to it. On the day of the match, Raimon is surprised about the Stadium. At the end, Endou and Sugimori talk to each other.
| 8 | "The Fearful Soccer Cyborgs!"; Transliteration: "Kyōfu no Sakkā Saibōgu!" (Japanese: 恐怖のサッカーサイボーグ!) | November 23, 2008 | August 3, 2011; January 11, 2017 (South Africa) |
Endou meets Sugimori in the locker rooms and Sugimori says he knows the percentage of Raimon winning the match. Endou asks how much it is and Sugimori replies with a non-like answer, "You better not ask". At the start of the match, Mikage Sennou's players don't move at all. Then, Sugimori commands Defense Formation Gamma 3. The players do what they're told and Someoka shoots Dragon Crash but it quickly loses power while going through a line of players. This causes Sugimori to catch it easily. Sugimori states that he knows Raimon's attack patterns, which is exactly the same as the data. Hence, they can make easy predictions. Mikage Sennou counterattacks and uses Attack Formation Beta 2. Kazemaru quickly slide tackles and breaks their formation, but Mikage Sennou quickly steals back the ball and passes many Raimon defenders. They begin their shoots but Endou catches them. When Endou is about to pass it, the opponent already marked all of Raimon. Luckily, Kazemaru shakes off his mark and passes to Gouenji. Gouenji uses Fire Tornado but Sugimori easily stops it with Shoot Pocket. Someoka runs up and does Dragon Tornado with Gouenji. Sugimori catches it this time with some difficulty using Shoot Pocket again. Again, Kabeyama runs up and does Inazuma Drop with Gouenji. This time the danger level of the shot goes to red, making Sugimori use a stronger technique, Rocket Fist and block it. Mikage Sennou shoots again while Endou withstands it with Hot-Blooded Punch. With the loose ball, another player forwards and does a hat trick with a finishing heading, which gives a score to Mikage Sennou. They are now just keeping the ball and passing it around without attacking. The whistle blows and it is half-time. While walking back to the locker rooms, Endou tells Sugimori that not attacking is not even called soccer. Sugimori says it was the coach's orders and explains that whether it's a 1-point victory or a 10-point, it's still the same victory. They will wait for the time to end without taking any risks. Sugimori says he believes he has all the data about Raimon and they will lose. Endou argues back that the Goddess of Victory will smile upon those who believe they'll win and asks if that soccer is fun. This leaves Sugimori confused. Endou then concludes that soccer is a fun sport and Raimon will show it to them. The second half starts with Mikage Sennou keeping the ball. Then, the coach orders the players to crush Raimon but Sugimori objects it. Endou thinks that if they won't attack, there is no point of him staying at the goal, so he runs up and joins to attack. He steals the ball and shoots toward Sugimori. Sugimori asks Endou why he joined the offense; Endou replies, "To score points, of course. That's soccer!" This leaves Sugimori confused once again. Raimon steals the ball again and moves up, but Mikage Sennou steals the ball back and starts attacking. Arata uses Patriot Shoot but Endou blocks it. Mikage Sennou starts with a corner kick. Endou runs up and tells Gouenji to follow him. Arata uses Patriot Shoot again but Endou and Gouenji shoot the ball back with a new sure-kill technique, the Inazuma No. 1, and tie the score. Raimon gets the ball again and shoots with Dragon Tornado. Sugimori uses Shoot Pocket to counter it but it goes in. Mikage Sennou's coach breaks the connection between the players. The rest of the players decide to give up. Someoka shoots Dragon Crash but Sugimori stops it with Shoot Pocket. Sugimori takes off the wires on his head and the other players follow. He tells the team to not give up until the last second. Mikage Sennou counterattacks. The match goes on and on with both teams going back and forth. When Gouenji uses Fire Tornado, Arata counters it back to block Gouenji. Both people fall down but Arata manages to pass the ball. Sugimori starts running with the ball away from the goal and shoots it toward Endou who then catches it with God Hand. The match ends and Raimon wins 2-1. Around the building, Detective Onigawara catches Fuyukai talking on the phone with Kageyama and says he will not forgive people who ruin soccer. At the end of the episode, Raimon realizes Gouenji has broken his leg. This means that Raimon must play in the next match without Gouenji.
| 9 | "Megane, Stand!"; Transliteration: "Megane, Tatsu!" (Japanese: 目金、立つ!) | November 30, 2008 | August 4, 2011; January 12, 2017(South Africa) |
Endou and his team don't know much about their next opponent, Shuuyou Meito, besides them beating Okaruto. So, as suggested by Megane, they go to a maid cafe where said team hangs out, to know more about them. Not too long after, Raimon "meets" the team, as well as their captain, Raito "Novel" Noberu, and their midfielder, Moe "Mangaka" Manga, who are later revealed to be the authors of what Megane claims to be the "most well-known moe manga in history", Magical Princess Silky Nana. This results in Megane getting along with them nicely. On the day of the match, Raimon's managers are asked to wear maid costumes, resulting in Natsumi being in a sour mood while Otonashi and Aki happily agree to it. Not much action occurs on the first half due to the odd movements of Shuuyo Meito's members. Raimon's opponents are playing very defensive, but when the second half starts, they play aggressively and score the first goal. Raimon are down by one goal and Someoka isn't able to score goals against them because of the unusual sure-kill technique of their goalkeeper. Raimon is in a big trouble but help comes from an unlikely hero... Megane. He discovers how the opponents cheat, cleverly cuts through their defense while giving each a piece of his mind as a fellow otaku, makes a header to Dragon Crash (creating Megane Crash) and scores a goal. A second goal is easily scored by Someoka and Raimon wins the match.
| 10 | "Teikoku's Spy!"; Transliteration: "Teikoku no Supai!" (Japanese: 帝国のスパイ!) | December 7, 2008 | August 5, 2011; January 13, 2017 (South Africa) |
Endou, with a few of the Raimon Eleven members and Domon, are walking home from school and decide to stop by at Rairaiken for a bite. Domon says he has to go off back home, but he stops halfway through and walks in an alley. He starts to mutter something through his phone. After his chat, he starts to feel dazed and guilty and almost gets run over by a truck. Aki meets him on the way back and mentions "Ichinose" in her tiny conversation with him. The next day, Domon heads off to the Raimon soccer club to take each of the members' training results from the Inabikari Training Center. He hesitates to take it and decides not to, because of his feelings of guilt. On the way back to his class, he notices Fuyukai with buckets in the garage where all of Raimon's buses are parked. He confronts Fuyukai and realizes that Fuyukai has set a trap on the bus they will ride on the way to their next match against Teikoku, because of a tiny clue from him saying 'Don't go on the bus that day'. Domon calls Kidou to meet him somewhere. Kidou expects Domon to have the training center results, but instead finds that Domon doesn't even have them with him. Instead, Domon tells Kidou about Kageyama ordering Fuyukai to lay a trap on the bus, something that Kidou didn't know. Later, Otonashi looks for Domon, and finds Kidou instead, revealing that they are biological siblings. At Kidou's house, he and his adoptive father have a tiny talk about Otonashi, Kidou mostly staying quiet since his confrontation with her. Endou and his team later go to Natsumi's dad's office, where they see Natsumi with a letter of confession from Domon, admitting everything about Fuyukai. They go to confront Fuyukai at the garage, and Natsumi officially fires him as a teacher there, but he then reveals to everyone that the letter was written by Domon, and that he was a spy for Teikoku Academy. Domon runs off to the riverbank, and Aki follows him. They have a short talk and get interrupted as Endou invites Domon to practice with him, forgiving him despite Domon formerly being Teikoku's spy. Later, Natsumi tells them that Raimon does not have a coach anymore and thus may not be able to participate in the finals of the Football Frontier Kanto Regionals. Will they be able to find a new coach before the finals? Or will they be unable to participate at all?
| 11 | "Find a New Coach!"; Transliteration: "Shin Kantoku o Sagase!" (Japanese: 新監督を探せ!) | December 14, 2008 | August 8, 2011; January 16, 2017 (South Africa) |
The big game against Teikoku is only a few days away. The members of Teikoku are practicing their technique, Death Zone. By firing Fuyukai, Raimon does not have a coach and that might lead to their disqualification, which some of the boys blame Natsumi for. Endou tries to motivate the others to start looking for a new coach before the game, but the others look low. They believe they can't just hire anyone to be their coach. Kageno scares everyone in the room with his dark aura. Realizing that he knew about Daisuke's notebook, Gouenji gives Endou the idea to ask the Rairaiken shop owner, Seigou Hibiki, to become their new coach, which they do. However, Hibiki doesn't show any interest in becoming their coach and rejects his proposal. To convince him, Endou brings out the fact that Hibiki knew about the secret manual and Domon mentions that he might have played with Endou's grandfather. However, Hibiki still isn't convinced to join and tries to scare them that being a legendary team will only bring them disaster. He tells the kids that if they don't order anything, they have to leave. Endou wants to order a bowl of ramen, but realizes he left his wallet in the clubroom, so Hibiki throws all of them out. Detective Onigawara is inside the restaurant and mentions that Endou knows how to use the God Hand. Natsumi is on her laptop trying to find a member of the Inazuma Eleven to take Fuyukai's place as a coach, but all the data about the soccer club from forty years ago has been deleted. The boys are on the field practicing, but Kabeyama feels too down to even move. He feels like they've already lost since they can't find a coach. Endou tries to encourage him, telling him that they'll definitely find one. This causes Kabeyama to cling hard to Endou, which brings a smile on the others' faces. While Endou is complaining to Kabeyama to let him go, Kidou pays them a visit. The members of Raimon think he wants to laugh at them for nearly being disqualified, but he wants to apologize for the incidents with Fuyukai and Domon. Kidou says that he's envious of them because Raimon win the matches with their own abilities, while Teikoku only win due to following their commanders' orders. Endou tries to convince him that this is not true and offers Kidou to practice with them, which he refuses it for now, but states they might do it in the near future. Masaru Anzai, a subordinate of Kageyama, tells him about Raimon's efforts to find a coach, stating that they asked the owner of Rairaiken to be their coach. At night, Kageyama pays Hibiki a visit only to brag about Teikoku being invincible. After getting a phone call from Kidou's father, who's worried about his son, he orders the driver to bring him to their mansion. Kidou is having an identity crisis, wondering who he exactly is. Kageyama tells him that ever since he was six, he was already a perfect being, the one he had been looking for, which is why he recommended him to the Kidou Financial Group. The two of them are having conflicting moralities about what soccer really is. When Kageyama tries touching Kidou's magazine, he immediately retracts it from his hands. Before leaving, Kageyama reminds Kidou one last time who he is. Raimon have only two days left until the match with Teikoku and they still haven't found a coach. Endou decides to ask Hibiki again. He meets Onigawara for the first time, who introduces himself as a detective. He wants to help Endou find a new coach because he has always been a fan of the Inazuma Eleven and after seeing Endou's God Hand during their practice match with Teikoku, he's convinced they can be revived. He also reveals to Endou the tragedy that happened forty years ago, which made the members of Inazuma Eleven to stop caring about soccer. After the detective tells him that Hibiki was the goalkeeper of the team and Daisuke's pupil, Endou thanks him and immediately dashes to Hibiki's restaurant. Endou, without giving up, challenges Hibiki. If he can stop all three of Hibiki's shoots, Hibiki must become their new coach. Fortunately, Endou successfully blocks all three shoots and manages to find Raimon a new coach.
| 12 | "The Finals: Royal Academy-First Half!!/The Final Against the Royal Academy, Part One!"; Transliteration: "Kessen! Teikoku Gakuen Zenpen!!" (Japanese: 決戦!帝国学園・前編!!) | December 21, 2008 | August 9, 2011; January 17, 2017 (South Africa) |
The Raimon 11 arrived at Teikoku Gakuen for the biggest game of their lives, but before they can begin they had to dispel the cloud of suspicion hanging over the place. Kageyama had set some kind of trap, he had secretly loosened the roof of the stadium they would be playing in, but Kidou figured it out. He quickly went to Endou to inform him of the danger, who believed him and got his team safe when the match started. Raimon thanked Kidou for his help and they played the finals in a fair manner. Will Endou and his team will be able to win this match?
| 13 | "The Finals: Royal Academy-Second Half!! /The Final Against the Royal Academy, Part Two!"; Transliteration: "Kessen! Teikoku Gakuen Kōhen!!" (Japanese: 決戦!帝国学園・後編!!) | December 28, 2008 | August 10, 2011; January 18, 2017 (South Africa) |
With Kageyama safely shut away, the game against Teikoku Gakuen has properly begun, and it's a real game this time. Whoever wins this comes out on top. But with the story about Kidou and Haruna in his head, will Endou hesitate on winning the game?
| 14 | "The Legendary Eleven!"/The Legendary Team!"; Transliteration: "Densetsu no Irebun!" (Japanese: 伝説のイレブン!) | January 4, 2009 | August 11, 2011; March 6, 2017 (South Africa) |
Raimon still can't believe they beat Teikoku Gakuen and are the new District Champion. After the celebratory dust settles, a mysterious figure walks into Hibiki's ramen bar. Is he really from the legendary Inazuma Eleven? Coach Hibiki decides to revive back the legendary Inazuma Eleven and calls for a practice match between The Inazuma Eleven and the Raimon Junior High. There the Inazuma Eleven shows the Raimon Junior High some new hissatsu techniques and Raimon were able to perfect the Honoo no Kazamidori.
| 15 | "This is It:The National Tournament!/The National Tournament Finally Begins!"; Transliteration: "Kita ze! Zenkoku Taikai!!" (Japanese: 来たぜ!全国大会!!) | January 11, 2009 | August 12, 2011/ March 7, 2017 (Nicktoons Africa) |
Raimon have set their sights on the Nationals Tournament and they're determined to win it. They're working hard to get there, but there are many obstacles – first there's the threat to their precious clubhouse but Endou is able to save it. Secondly, there is a possibility that Kazemaru might leave the team after meeting up once more Miyasaka Ryou and his other friends of Raimon's Athletics Club. Will his passion for soccer make him remain in the team?
| 16 | "Soccer: Ninja Style!/Let's Beat the Ninja School!"; Transliteration: "Yabure! Ninja Sakkā!!" (Japanese: 破れ!忍者サッカー!!) | January 18, 2009 | August 15, 2011/March 8, 2017(Nicktoons Africa) |
With Kazemaru still on the team, for now, Raimon can move forward and concentrate on the Nationals. And they'll need to – their first game is against the speedy Sengoku Igajima Junior High. If they don't win this, the dream is over before it's even begun!
| 17 | "Jude's Decision! /Jude's Decision!"; Transliteration: "Kidō no Ketsui!" (Japanese: 鬼道の決意!) | January 25, 2009 | August 16, 2011/March 9, 2017 (Nicktoons Africa) |
The narrow victory over Sengoku Igajima has given Raimon confidence, but on the other side of the tournament, everyone is shock at Teikoku Gakuen's complete defeat at the hands of Zeus Junior High, which is 10-0. What should Kidou do? If Raimon wants to beat them, they'll need to train even harder, and maybe even recruit new members!
| 18 | ""Break the Unbreakable Wall!"/"Break Through the Never-Ending Wall!""; Transliteration: "Kudake! Mugen no Kabe!!" (Japanese: 砕け!無限の壁!!) | February 1, 2009 | August 17, 2011/ March 10, 2017 (Nicktoons Africa) |
With their firepower boosted by the addition of Kidou Yuuto, the team are ready to tackle Senbayama Junior High and their unbreakable defense. But unless they get their pass coordinated, all their hard work will come to nothing! Will they able to break the iron defense?
| 19 | "The Reincarnated Genius! /A Star Returns!"; Transliteration: "Yomigaetta Tensai!" (Japanese: よみがえった天才!) | February 8, 2009 | August 18, 2011/March 13, 2017 (Nicktoons Africa) |
Ichinose Kazuya is back! Like a phoenix he has risen from the ashes and come back to visit his old friends. Just in time too, Raimon is desperate for some new moves, and the Tri-Pegasus is just what they need. But can they perfect it in time?
| 20 | "The Killer Triangle Z! /The Definitive Technique: The Z Triangle!"; Transliteration: "Hissatsu no Toraianguru Z!" (Japanese: 必殺のトライアングルZ!) | February 15, 2009 | August 19, 2011/March 14, 2017 (Nicktoons Africa) |
Raimon are getting ready to play their next big opponent – Kidokawa Seishuu, which just happens to be Gouenji's old school. Certain members of that team still carry a grudge against him and will stop at nothing to get their revenge. This results into a practice match with the Mukata triplets vs Endou. Unfortunately, Endou doesn't stand a chance against Triangle Z! Will Raimon lose at this rate?
| 21 | ""The Clash With Kirkwood Jnr. High"/"A Fierce Duel With Kirkwood!""; Transliteration: "Gekitō! Kidokawa Seishū!!" (Japanese: 激闘!木戸川清修!!) | February 22, 2009 | August 22, 2011/March 15, 2017 (Nicktoons Africa) |
The Mukata triplets and their grudge are dominating Raimon at every turn, but they need to find the strength to overcome their malice if they're going to make it to the final. They are trying to take on everyone on their own, and not co-operating with the others. If they don't work together, their dream is finished!
| 22 | "Go Beyond the God Hand! /I'll Get Past the God Hand!"; Transliteration: "Goddo Hando o Koero!" (Japanese: ゴッドハンドを超えろ!) | March 1, 2009 | August 23, 2011/March 16, 2017 (Nicktoons Africa) |
Raimon Junior High are through to the finals, but they're all getting nervous about playing the terrifying Zeus Junior High. Endou is convinced he's not good enough, and if that weren't enough to rattle nerves, it seems that Kageyama is working on some fiendish plot behind the scenes. Will he sabotage Raimon?
| 23 | "A Challenge from a God!/Challenged By a God!"; Transliteration: "Kami no Chōsen-jō!" (Japanese: 神の挑戦状!) | March 8, 2009 | August 24, 2011/March 17, 2017 (Nicktoons Africa) |
As the finals against Zeus draws nearer, so does Raimon's anticipation and dread. The team are working hard, but the level they have to reach seems beyond their grasp. Will they get it together in time for the finals?
| 24 | "Time For Training Camp!/Let's Go to Training Camp!"; Transliteration: "Gasshuku Yarou ze!" (Japanese: 合宿やろうぜ!) | March 15, 2009 | August 25, 2011/March 20, 2017 (Nicktoons Africa) |
The big game with Zeus is almost on top of them but Endou still hasn't mastered Majin The Hand. Coach Hibiki decided that everyone should spend the night at school as a sleepover training camp. The members of Inazuma Eleven brought a machine with them which was used by Hibiki to master the Majin The Hand which in turn didn't work out well for him. Endou practiced on it very hard and at last, he was able to complete the obstacle course with the help of his teammates. Gouenji, Kidou and Coach Hibiki used Inazuma Break a few times at Endou and Endou was able to stop the balls but still he didn't manage to master Majin The Hand. The team's aura was at first down, but after Otonashi's convincing that their soccer is to shoot more than the opponents did, everyone regained their confidence.
| 25 | "The Final Battle!/The Last Playoff!"; Transliteration: "Saigo no Kessen!" (Japanese: 最後の決戦!) | March 22, 2009 | August 26, 2011/March 21, 2017 (Nicktoons Africa) |
This is it, the finals of the Nationals has arrived. Zeus storm to an early lead of three goals and nothing Raimon does has any effect on them. Are they really gods? Or is something else going on? Either way, if Raimon don't turn the game around they're going to get annihilated!
| 26 | "God Vs Majin!/Clash! God VS Devil!!"; Transliteration: "Gekitotsu! Kami VS Majin!!" (Japanese: 激突!神VS魔神!!) | March 29, 2009 | August 29, 2011/March 22, 2017 (Nicktoons Africa) |
Raimon are down by three goals and are getting clobbered by the Zeus after losing IE 26 HQ soccer gods of Zeus. The situation looks completely hopeless and the clock is running down. All the players of Raimon are down by the unnatural strength of Zeus, who are using Aqua of Gods, which is a kind of water that gives a supernatural power to humans. All Raimon players have lost the hope and Aphrodi is striking the ball at Endou, but Endou is stopping each of them by his body. By seeing his strength, Aphrodi becomes impatient and shoots God Knows at Endou. Endou suddenly realizes the secret to master Majin The Hand and stops the ball. Suddenly, all Raimon players become fearless and Gouenji and Kidou score three goals, one after the other, and the score is tied. Then, with a combination of The Phoenix and Fire Tornado, Raimon scores the final goal and wins the match with the score 4-3, finally winning the Football Frontier.

=== Season 2 (2009–2010) ===
| No. | English title (Translated title) | Original release date | English air date |
|---|---|---|---|
| 27 | "The Aliens Are Here!/ The Aliens Came!"; Transliteration: "Uchū-jin ga Kita!" (Japanese: 宇宙人が来た!) | April 8, 2009 | August 30, 2011/May 1, 2017 (Nicktoons Africa) |
Raimon's victory proves to be short-lived, as only a few minutes after their win, the sky falls in. All of a sudden the earth is overrun by aliens! What will Endou and the others do about this out of this world development?
| 28 | "The Raimon 11 Fight Back! /Sortie! The Kaminarimon Eleven!!"; Transliteration: "Shutsugeki! Raimon Irebun!!" (Japanese: 出撃!雷門イレブン!!) | April 15, 2009 | August 31, 2011/May 2, 2017 (Nicktoons Africa) |
The Raimon Eleven have stepped up to battle the soccer players of Aliea Gakuen, who call themselves Gemini Storm, but it's like pitting an ant against an elephant. Meanwhile, the Prime Minister is in danger from the very same threat, as, indeed, is the world itself.
| 29 | "Take Down the Black 11!/Defeat! The 11 in Black!!"; Transliteration: "Taose! Kuro no 11-nin!!" (Japanese: 倒せ!黒の11人!!) | April 22, 2009 | September 1, 2011/May 3, 2017 (Nicktoons Africa) |
The Prime Minister has been kidnapped by aliens, with Endou and the others determined to save him. The Inazuma Caravan travels to the park where he was kidnapped, ready to beat the aliens. But wait — who are these people? And why do they think the Raimon Eleven are aliens?
| 30 | "The Threat of Alias Academy! /Threat! Eiria Academy!!"; Transliteration: "Kyōi! Eiria Gakuen!!" (Japanese: 脅威!エイリア学園!!) | April 29, 2009 | September 2, 2011/May 4, 2017 (Nicktoons Africa) |
The Raimon Eleven never gives up, and they're going to try again against Gemini Storm. They go head to head, but the Aliea players are just too powerful. In the end, Endou gets seriously injured because of the coach's orders, and ace striker Gouenji is asked to leave. Unbeknownst to the team, Gouenji was being blackmailed by Aliea agents regarding his sister, so accepts the order with no pushback.
| 31 | "The Search For The Legendary Striker /Looking for the Legendary Striker!"; Transliteration: "Densetsu no Sutoraikā o Sagase!" (Japanese: 伝説のストライカーを探せ!) | May 6, 2009 | September 5, 2011/May 5, 2017 (Nicktoons Africa) |
The news that Gouenji has been kicked off the team doesn't sit well with most of the Raimon Eleven, especially Someoka. He carries the grudge all the way to Hokkaido, as the team search for a mysterious ace striker - Fubuki Shirou. While traveling through a blizzard, they come across a stranger freezing in the cold. Who is he, and where did this stranger come from?
| 32 | "The Prince of Snowland! /The Prince Of Snowland!"; Transliteration: "Setsugen no Ōji!" (Japanese: 雪原の皇子!) | May 13, 2009 | September 6, 2011/May 8, 2017 (Nicktoons Africa) |
The Raimon team are both excited and surprised when they finally meet Shirou Fubuki, discovering that he's the stranger they had picked up earlier. But is he really as good as everyone says? There's only one way to find out, and that's to play a match against him. Will he live up to the hype?
| 33 | "Who is the New Ace Striker? /Who is the Striker?"; Transliteration: "Ēsu Sutoraikā wa Dare da!" (Japanese: エースストライカーはだれだ!) | May 20, 2009 | September 7, 2011/May 9, 2017 (Nicktoons Africa) |
Fubuki proves himself to be as skilled a player as they had heard, if not more-so. However, before they can properly recruit him, Gemini Storm arrives. Will their new striker be enough to finally achieve victory?
| 34 | "An Attack from Aluis Academy!"/"Shock! Eiria Academy!!"; Transliteration: "Shōgeki! Eiria Gakuen!!" (Japanese: 衝撃!エイリア学園!!) | May 27, 2009 | September 8, 2011/May 10, 2017 (Nicktoons Africa) |
With Fubuki's help, Raimon defeats Gemini Storm. However, another Aliea team, calling themselves Epsilon, arrives, and seemingly erases Gemini Storm from existence. Their leader, Desarm, says he will face Raimon at a later date. Has the teams's job just got harder?
| 35 | "Epsilon's Attacks!/Epsilon's Attack!"; Transliteration: "Ipushiron Raishū!" (Japanese: イプシロン来襲!) | June 3, 2009 | September 9, 2011/May 11, 2017 (Nicktoons Africa) |
Just when everyone thought the earth had been saved, Epsilon picks up where Gemini Storm left off. These guys mean serious business, and their next target it Manyuuji Junior High in Kyōto. Will Raimon be able to help them, or is it too late? Meanwhile, Haruna thinks she's found a new member for the team? Who is he? And will he be of any help?
| 36 | "The Hidden Power! /Hidden Power!"; Transliteration: "Kakusareta Chikara!" (Japanese: かくされた力!) | June 10, 2009 | September 12, 2011/May 12, 2017 (Nicktoons Africa) |
After the crushing defeat of Manyuuji Junior High, Raimon step up to take on Epsilon, with Kogure Yuuya joining them on Otonashi Haruna's urging. The results are strange and disheartening, but also encouraging in a way. They're going to have to do a lot of hard work though!
| 37 | "Royal Academy Strikes Back:(Part 1)/Teikoku Strikes Back!! (Part 1)"; Transliteration: "Teikoku no Gyakushū Zenpen!!" (Japanese: 帝国の逆襲・前編!!) | June 17, 2009 | September 13, 2011/May 15, 2017 (Nicktoons Africa) |
After learning that Kageyama Reiji has escaped, Kidou makes it his mission to track down his former mentor before he can hurt anyone else. They meet a young man called Fudou Akio, a member of Shin Teikoku, who leads them to Kageyama. Once there, Kidou discovers that Sakuma and Genda have rejoined Kageyama. Why? How is this possible?
| 38 | "Royal Academy Strikes Back:(Part 2)/Teikoku Strikes Back!! (Part 2)"; Transliteration: "Teikoku no Gyakushū Kōhen!!" (Japanese: 帝国の逆襲・後編!!) | June 24, 2009 | September 14, 2011/May 16, 2017 (Nicktoons Africa) |
Kidou realizes that Sakuma and Genda have been taught forbidden techniques by Kageyama, which will kill or incapacitate them if used too often. Can he get through to them before it's too late?
| 39 | "The Last Wyvern Blizzard!/The Last Wyvern Blizzard!"; Transliteration: "Saigo no Waibān Burizādo!" (Japanese: 最後のワイバーンブリザード!) | July 1, 2009 | September 15, 2011/May 17, 2017 (Nicktoons Africa) |
Raimon finally comes home to recharge their batteries, and to do some more training. They find out that everyone's been training to help them, including some old opponents! But all is not well on the team; the tough training has proved to be too much for one member in particular.
| 40 | "Eric Eagle In Serious Trouble! /Eric Eagle In Serious Trouble!"; Transliteration: "Ichinose! Saidai no Kiki!!" (Japanese: 一之瀬!最大の危機!!) | July 8, 2009 | September 16, 2011 |
Raimon arrived in Naniwa Land, where rumors say that Aliea Gakuen has some sort of base. However, Ichinose gets side-tracked by a girl named Urabe Rika, who tricks him into eating her 'lovey-dovey dish', claiming he now has to marry her. The team challenges Rika's team, the Osaka Gals, to a match' the winner will get Ichinose. Will Raimon win against these powerful soccer girls? What will happen to Ichinose?
| 41 | "Demolins Trap!"; Transliteration: "Dezāmu no Wana!" (Japanese: デザームの罠!) | July 22, 2009 | September 19, 2011 |
The team trains with the Osaka Gals in the secret Aliea base, which the Gals have discovered and co-opted. However, Epsilon materialize inside the base, challenging Raimon to a fight. Will Raimon be victorious this time?
| 42 | "Epsilon! The Toughest Battle Yet!"; Transliteration: "Gekitō! Saikyō Ipushiron!!" (Japanese: 激闘!最凶イプシロン!!) | July 29, 2009 | September 20, 2011 |
The big game against Epsilon is here, and Raimon fights back with all their might! Will they be able to win against the aliens? Meanwhile, Fubuki is having an identity crisis that threatens to tear him and the team apart!
| 43 | "Grandpa's Secret Trick!"; Transliteration: "Jī-chan no Kyūkyoku Ōgi!" (Japanese: じいちゃんの究極奥義!) | August 5, 2009 | September 21, 2011 |
The team heads to Fukuoka to find another notebook of Endou's grandfather. There, they meet Tachimukai Yuki, a huge fan of Endou's who has mastered his own version of God Hand. But is he just as good as his idol? Only one way to find out!
| 44 | "The Other Majin The Hand!"; Transliteration: "Mō Hitotsu no Majin za Hando!" (Japanese: もうひとつのマジン・ザ・ハンド!) | August 12, 2009 | September 22, 2011 |
The exhibition game between Raimon and Yokato is a knuckle biting affair, with both Endou and Tachimukai ahowing off their Goalkeeper moves. After seeing Majin The Hand, Tachimukai tries to learn it too. Meanwhile they're being watched - just who is this Hiroto boy...?
| 45 | "Size Make Earthquake!"; Transliteration: "Gekishin! Saikyō no Jeneshisu!!" (Japanese: 激震!最強のジェネシス!!) | August 19, 2009 | September 23, 2011 |
Hiroto reveals himself to be Gran, captain of Aliea Gakuen's The Genesis, and challenges Raimon to a game. It quickly turns into a one-sided match, as The Genesis keeps on scoring and none of the Raimon Eleven can keep up with their movements. Fubuki gets injured while trying to stop Gran's shoot, Ryuusei Blade, and his past is revealed after the match by Coach Hitomiko. But what's even more shocking is Kazemaru's decision to quit the team!
| 46 | "The Captain's Trial!"; Transliteration: "Kyaputen no Shiren!" (Japanese: キャプテンの試練!) | August 26, 2009 | September 26, 2011 |
The departures of Kazemaru and Kurimitsu send Endou into a deep depression. Can his teammates snap him out of it and convince him to continue the mission?
| 47 | "The Great Battle In The Southern Sea!"; Transliteration: "Nankai no Daikettō!" (Japanese: 南海の大決闘!) | September 2, 2009 | September 27, 2011 |
The news about the existence of a flame striker sends Raimon to Okinawa, hoping that it might be Gouenji Shuuya. But what unexpected things might happen along the way? And who is this crazy surfer dude?
| 48 | "The Flame Striker!"; Transliteration: "Honoo no Sutoraikā!" (Japanese: 炎のストライカー!) | September 9, 2009 | September 28, 2011 |
Right after arriving at Okinawa, Raimon starts the search for the flame striker. While searching, Fubuki and Domon run into a player claiming he's the flame striker. After they take him to the team, he introduces himself as Nagumo Haruya and shows them his hissatsu shot. It seems Nagumo will be a great assist to Raimon, but can he be trusted?
| 49 | "The Radical Rhythmic Soccer Game!"; Transliteration: "Norinori! Rizumu Sakkā!!" (Japanese: ノリノリ!リズムサッカー!!) | September 16, 2009 | September 29, 2011 |
Tsunami reveals to Raimon that he has joined his school's soccer club, and they want to have a game with them. Raimon goes to Oumihara Junior High, and the game begins. They soon realize that, while the Oumihara players seem quite weird, they're actually very good. And how in the world do they keep stealing the ball, as well as evading attacks from Raimon every time?
| 50 | "The Fist of Justice!"; Transliteration: "Unare! Seigi no Tekken!!" (Japanese: うなれ!正義の鉄拳!!) | September 23, 2009 | September 30, 2011 |
The game between Raimon and Oumihara continues, with neither teams pulling back. In the end Raimon wins, but it's a narrow victory. But Raimon's joy doesn't last long, as Epsilon crashes the party.
| 51 | "Epsilon's Counterattack!"; Transliteration: "Gyakushū! Ipushiron Kai!!" (Japanese: 逆襲!イプシロン改!!) | September 30, 2009 | October 4, 2011 |
Epsilon, now calling themselves Epsilon Kai, challenge Raimon to a rematch. Will the addition of Tsunami work in Raimon's favor? Meanwhile, Fubuki begins having another identity crisis. Will it cost this match, as it did the last one?
| 52 | "The Explosive Flames of Revival!"; Transliteration: "Fukkatsu no Bakuen!" (Japanese: 復活の爆炎!) | September 30, 2009 | October 5, 2011 |
The matcb between Raimon and Episolon Kai continues, with Episilon dominating the field. But just when all seems lost, an unexpected figure shows up. Can it really be him?
| 53 | "The Freezing Darkness Of Diamond Dust!"; Transliteration: "Itetsuku Yami Daiyamondo Dasuto!" (Japanese: 凍てつく闇・ダイヤモンドダスト!) | October 6, 2009 | October 6, 2011 |
Gouenji's return, along with the victory against Epsilon Kai, have lifted Raimon's spirits. They decide to go back home to rest. But as soon as they get back, Aliea Gakuen's Diamond Dust demand that Raimon face them in a game, or Tokyo will be destroyed with black soccer balls. However, it's a tough match right in the beginning. Endou is having difficulty in blocking even normal shoots. Just then, an old opponent appears before them...
| 54 | "The Strongest Assist, Aphrodi!"; Transliteration: "Saikyō no Sukketo Afurodi!" (Japanese: 最強の助っ人アフロディ!) | October 14, 2009 | October 7, 2011 |
Someone unexpected is here to join Raimon in the middle of the match - Aphrodi! Raimon's former rival has come to join and fight alongside them! But most of the old Raimon members don't trust this player. And when Tsunami gets hold of the ball, things start looking a little better...
| 55 | "A New Challenge!"; Transliteration: "Endō Aratanaru Chōsen!" (Japanese: 円堂・新たなる挑戦!) | October 21, 2009 | October 8, 2011 |
Coach Hitomiko decides to remove Endou as goalkeeper, asking him to train as a libero. Following this, Aphrodi becomes a forward, and Tachimukai takes Endou's place as goalkeeper. Can the team adjust to these new positions? And will this lead to the creation of new hissatsu?
| 56 | "Showdown! Endō VS Gōenji!!"; Transliteration: "Taiketsu! Endō VS Gōenji!!" (Japanese: 対決!円堂VS豪炎寺!!) | October 28, 2009 | October 10, 2011 |
The Raimon Eleven comes to Teikoku Gakuen for training, as requested by Kidou. Kidou also requests his former teammates, the Teikoku team, to play a friendly against Raimon, with Endou, Kidou and Domon on Teikoku's side. Will this cooperation allow them to master Teikoku's signature move, Death Zone?
| 57 | "The Miraculous Team! The Chaos!!"; Transliteration: "Kiseki no Chīmu! Za Kaosu!!" (Japanese: 奇跡のチーム!ザ・カオス!!) | November 4, 2009 | October 11, 2011 |
At the beginning of the episode, it shows that all of the Raimon are in Teikoku grounds when a soccer ball appeared. It created a fog and when it cleared up, Gazel and Burn was shown and declaring themselves as "Chaos" to tell the Raimon to have a fight with them to prove who is best in the universe and with that Natsumi, Kino and Otonashi went to tell Coach Hitomiko about the challenge in two days at Teikoku stadium.Kidou is giving out orders about the training before the match with The Chaos begun (in which in their time is tomorrow). Endou, Domon and Kidou are going to strengthen Death Zone 2, Tachimukai, Tsunami will continue to work on Mugen The Hand and for the others will work on their formation centering around Gouenji and Aphrodi.And their training begun.The first scene of their training starts off with Tachimuukai and Tsunami. Tsunami used Tsunami Boost. Tachimuukai stood on his ground as he thinks of what Tsunami told him earlier. He claps his hand and a blue hand (similar to God Hand) appeared in front of him but was shattered in pieces and Tachimuukai was sent to the goal along with the ball. He threw the ball back to Tsunami and their training continues with and sound of Tsunami saying "Tsunami Boost". The tree girls are watching them train while Fubuki stood afar.Endou, Domon and Kidou practiced Death Zone 2 while the others are practicing with Gouenji and Aphrodi. Fubuki looks at them training and walks away.Endou noticed him leave as Aphrodi says in his mind that he'll watch Raimon in his place until he comes back. He is then seen in the riverbank where kids are playing soccer. He reminisced on what happened a while ago with Endou starting with Death Zone 2, Tachimuukai with Mugen the Hand and Gouenji passing the ball to Aphrodi. He then clenched his fist and if he starts to kick the ball, Atsuya might take over him again. A ball was accidentally thrown to him by two kids and asked him if he can give the ball back. When he grabbed the ball he then remembered him and Atsuya when they were kids. He stood still and the two boys snapped him out and he threw the ball back to the kids. The boys left and Fubuki saw Atsuya and tries to call him but it was only an imagination. And with that, the practice at Raimon ended.Endou was about to go home when Gazel and Burn's image flashed. Tsunami called him and both of them went to the Steel Tower Plaza. Tsunami saw the tire where Endou usually trains. Endou showed Tsunami how he trains with it and Tsunami tries. When he threw the tire, he jumps on it as the tire swings. He then jumpes off and Endou commented on him that he has an amazing balance. Kidou and Gouenji turned up. Gounji and Tsunami were "playing" with the tire while Endou and Kidou were talking about Gran. Tsunami then calls Kidou and Endou.And the day arrived to where they will have a match with The Chaos in Teikoku Stadium. They were all waiting for Chaos to arrive. The rest of the Teikoku were the audience. Fubuki was far to where the others are and Aphrodi looks to where he sat while Tachimukai was still worried about Mugen The Hand. Tsunami comforts himby saying have more confidence in himself. And The Chaos appeared.The match begun with Kakuma comentaring and with Raimon's kickoff. Gouenji and Aphrodi dashed upward. Aphrodi passed the ball to Gouenji and Gouenji passed the ball to Ichinose to Touko while Fubuki watches them. Droll steals the ball and charges forward and was able to get past Domon and Kabeyama and keeps on going. Tsunami dashes forward to him but he passed the ball to Gazel. He did Northern Impact and Tachimukai did Majin The Hand, since Mugen The Hand is still not complete, failed and thus The Chaos scored. The match continued with the ball to Endou. He passed the ball to Gouenji and moves up and was surrounded by Gokka and Clear and Gouenji passed the ball to Aphrodi. Nepper charged towards him. Aphrodi stopped and did Heaven's Time. Nepper and Heat were frozen as Aphrodi walks with the ball away from them. And at some time, Nepper was unfrozen and stole the ball from Aphrodi. Nepper passed the ball to Heat but Kidou makes a steal. Gouenji was blocked and Kidou kicked the ball to Aphrodi who was open. Aphrodi did Heaven's Time and it failed again. Nepper got past Endou and the ball went to Burn and he did Atomic Flare. Tachimukai used Majin The Hand once more but failed again. Gazel used Northern Impact and scored; Burn did Atomic Flare again scored. They shot nonstop at Tachimukai and Chaos scored 10-0. Chaos momentum won't stop and Burn used his hissatsu once more and Endou did Megaton Head and he fell back without Chaos score. Everytime The Chaos attacks, Raimon's defense won't let them score to the goal. Ichinose rushes up ahead but Bomber uses Ignite Steal. Raimon attacks continuously. Kidou then tries to think of a strategy. Nepper got passed Kidou's slide and Ichinose's Flame Dance. The episode ended with 10-0 Chaos in the lead.
| 58 | "Explode! Fire Blizzard!"; Transliteration: "Sakuretsu! Faia Burizādo!!" (Japanese: 炸裂!ファイアブリザード!!) | November 11, 2009 | October 12, 2011 |
Thanks to Otomura, Kidou figures out how to stop Chaos' rhythm. The flow of the game is totally reversed as Raimon keeps scoring without stopping. Gazel and Burn realize their team members are fighting amongst themselves and decide to use Fire Blizzard to show them that together they're unbeatable. Also, Chaos creates an ultimate defense by combining Frozen Steal and Ignite Steal. Aphrodi tries to get past their wall but cannot and instead gets injured and has to leave the team. Despite Aphrodi's injuries, Coach Hitomiko doesn't substitute in Rika, leading to Rika's anger with the coach. The game comes to a halt because Gran intervenes. But what does he mean when he refers to Coach Hitomiko as "sister"?.
| 59 | "At Last We're Here! Aliea Academy!!"; Transliteration: "Tsui ni Kita! Eiria Gakuen!!" (Japanese: ついに来た!エイリア学園!!) | November 18, 2009 | October 13, 2011 |
Raimon learns that Hitomiko and Gran are both related. They were shocked to hear that they were both siblings. Then, Raimon started to demand answers. Hitomiko then states that if they want the answer, they must continue to ride on the Inazuma Caravan and go to Mt. Fuji.The whole team is still deciding whether to come. Though in the end, after some thinking, they all decided to go.During the night, Fubuki trains alone. He trains by shooting balls in the goal, but fails to hit it. Gouenji then came and they trained together. When it started to rain, Fubuki suddenly panicked. The sound of the thunder reminded him of the sound of the avalanche which killed his family. Fubuki tells Gouenji that he hates to be alone. Gouenji then leaves him since he is the only one who can answer his own problems.While traveling, Endou discussed about the hissatsu, The Earth which was in his grandfather's notebook. Afterwards, when they reached Mt. Fuji, they were shocked seeing a giant UFO-like floating object.
| 60 | "Aliea Academy's True Identity!"; Transliteration: "Eiria Gakuen no Shōtai!" (Japanese: エイリア学園の正体!) | December 2, 2009 | October 14, 2011 |
As Raimon enters Aliea Gakuen, its shocking truth is revealed: the Aliea players were human children whose abilities had been enhanced by the Aliea meteorite. Following this revelation, the battle to decide the world's fate between Raimon and The Genesis begins!
| 61 | "The Final Battle!(Part 1)"; Transliteration: "Saishū Kessen! Za Jeneshisu Zenpen!!" (Japanese: 最終決戦!ザ・ジェネシス・前編!!) | December 9, 2009 | October 17, 2011 |
The match between Raimon and The Genesis continues. Raimon is down by one goal and is in big trouble. Tachimukai isn't able to stop the ball using Mugen The Hand. Then, Fubuki decides to come back to the field to find his answer. Though, Atsuya keeps gaining control on him. Gouenji kicks the ball at Fubuki then asks him: "Can't you hear their voices?" Finally Fubuki knows what his father meant with "perfect". Fubuki then gains control over Atsuya's soul and is able to play his soccer. He then uses a new hissatsu, Wolf Legend and equals the scores. However, Kira Seijirou reveals another secret: Although the energy from the Aliea meteorite is what strengthens humans, The Genesis is made up of normal humans who became stronger through training! The Genesis now shows their true power and scores another goal using Supernova and breaks through the evolved Mugen The Hand. The score is now 2-1 with The Genesis taking the lead.
| 62 | "The Final Battle!(Part 2)"; Transliteration: "Saishū Kessen! Za Jeneshisu Kōhen!!" (Japanese: 最終決戦!ザ・ジェネシス・後編!!) | December 16, 2009 | October 18, 2011 |
The match starts again in the 2nd half and The Genesis is still in the lead. Kira Seijirou tells the truth and that he states that the other Raimon members where weak, and that is why they were removed. This made Endou angry and started to charge on his own but fails to do so. Later, Coach Hitomiko said that she want to change her father's mind. She stated that she cannot do it alone, but she can do it with everyone. Everyone in Raimon unify their feeling and able to use the new hissatsu, The Earth and won the game in the end because of this hissatsu. Though, after Seijirou realizing his wrongdoings, Ulvida lost her temper towards "their father" and shot a ball at him. This episode ends with the shocked faces of everyone.
| 63 | "The Neverending Threat!"; Transliteration: "Owari Naki Kyōi!" (Japanese: 終わりなき脅威!) | December 23, 2009 | October 19, 2011 |
Raimon has finally defeated The Genesis, and opened Seijirou's eyes. But one question remains; why did Seijirou start Aliea Gakuen in the first place?!
| 64 | "The Raimon vs. Raimon Face Off!"; Transliteration: "Gekitotsu! Raimon VS Raimon!!" (Japanese: 激突!雷門VS雷門!!) | January 6, 2010 | October 20, 2011 |
On returning to school, the Raimon Eleven are confronted by a group of cloaked figures. They throw back their hoods, revealing themselves to be Kazemaru, Someoka, and their other former teammates. What's going on? Why are they calling themselves the Dark Emperors? And why do they seem to hate Endou so much?
| 65 | "The Ultimate Friendship Move!"; Transliteration: "Yūjō no Kyūkyoku Ōgi!" (Japanese: 友情の究極奥義!) | January 13, 2010 | October 21, 2011 |
Both teams prove to be evenly-matched, with the score standing at 2-2. However, things take a turn when the Dark Emperors start attacking violently. The Raimon Eleven try to block the Dark Emperors' shots with their own bodies, but fall one after another. Endou switches back to goalkeeper to replace an injured Tachimukai. What can he do to remind their old friends of their true soccer?
| 66 | "The Worlds Strongest Team! Blizzard Version!"; Transliteration: "Chijō Saikyō no Chīmu e! Burizādo-hen!!" (Japanese: 地上最強のチームへ!ブリザード編!!) | January 20, 2010 | October 22, 2011 |
Raimon's long fight against Aliea Gakuen is finally over, and everyone is prepared to go home. Fubuki finds Endou in his training place, and the two of them recall their journey from the day Gemini Storm appeared to before going to Okinawa. Then Gouenji joins them.
| 67 | "The Worlds Strongest Team! Fire Version!"; Transliteration: "Chijō Saikyō no Chīmu e! Faia-hen!!" (Japanese: 地上最強のチームへ!ファイア編!!) | January 27, 2010 | October 25, 2011 |
Gouenji tells Endou and Fubuki about the time when he left Raimon, then they recall their numerous battles against Aliea Gakuen, training, meeting new friends and enemies. The three of them then promise to have a match between Raimon and Hakuren next time.

=== Season 3 (2010–2011) ===
| No. | English title (Translated title) | Original release date | English air date |
|---|---|---|---|
| 68 | "Gather Together! Team Japan!"; Transliteration: "Shūketsu! Nippon Daihyō!!" (Japanese: 集結!日本代表!!) | February 3, 2010 | October 26, 2011 |
The greatest competition in history, the Football Frontier International, is here. Players from around the world have their eyes fixed upon it, aiming for the world's best. And, of course, so are Japan's. Coach Hibiki has gathered many players: some from Raimon, others from their friends' and rivals' schools, a few are old enemies from Aliea Gakuen, and some are complete strangers too. Japan's twenty-two candidates compete in a selection match to decide its representatives.
| 69 | "The Birth of Inazuma Japan!"; Transliteration: "Tanjō! Inazuma Japan!!" (Japanese: 誕生!イナズマジャパン!!) | February 10, 2010 | October 27, 2011 |
The game that will decide who gets to represent Japan is going to start. Throughout the match, the players ferociously appeal themselves to be chosen for the national team. However, regardless of the outcome of the game, it's up to the coach to decide which 16 players out of 22 candidates will be chosen for Japan's national team, Inazuma Japan. The players are divided into two teams, first team is of Endou and second is of Kidou. Both team players are determined for their best play in the match. There is a huge crowd came to see the match among them are also the candidates teammates and friends supporting them.As the match started with a whistle, both teams attacked each other with their powerful shoots like Fire Tornado, Tsunami Boost, Wyvern Crash etc. But the goal keepers defended them. Fuyuppe's father was watching the match and each player's ability and tactics with an Eagle eye. On the other side Hiroto scores first goal for team A with his Ryuusei Blade. After a few minutes Gouenji makes it equal from team B by shooting Bakunetsu Storm. The first half ends when Someoka with his Wyvern Crash makes it 2-1. Second half starts and continues the high end battle between the teams, score was tied when Midorikawa from team B shoot Astro Break into the goal. Endou's team won the match when Fubuki's Wolf Legend went straight into the goal. At the time to make the decision, Coach Hibiki introduced Fuyuppe's father, Kudou Michiya as the new coach in FFI for Inazuma Eleven. Coach Kudou announced the 16 selected players to represent Japan. Now, it was the start of a new Inazuma Japan.
| 70 | "The Cursed Coach!"; Transliteration: "Norowareta Kantoku!" (Japanese: 呪われた監督!) | February 17, 2010 | October 28, 2011 |
The first day of Inazuma Japan's practice starts. Toramaru arrives late because he is not staying with the rest of the team, claiming that he can't sleep outside his house. Because of that, Fudou mocks him about being childish, which annoyed everyone else. Then the coach comes, and introduces Fuyuka to the team as a new manager. When Fuyuka starts calling Endou "Mamoru-kun," Endou thought that Fuyuka has regained her memories, but she hasn't yet. Later, Kudou explains that the team has a far way to go, and they started practicing. As they practice, they suddenly realized the strict nature of the new coach. After practice, Hiroto approached Endou and asks about the coach, and Endou replies to Hiroto's question by saying that Kudou is a good coach.The next day of the practice, Fudou violently tackles Kazemaru and steals the ball from him. Despite everybody's reaction, Kudou gives him a good remark. Later at the Rairaiken shop, Endou, Kazemaru, Kabeyama, and Kurimatsu seem depressed after the training, and are served with ramen and charsiu. In the third day of practice, Haruna and Megane sneak into the Junior High Soccer Association Headquarters to learn more about Kudou. They discover that Coach Kudou was rumored to be the "Cursed Coach." Later, Endou sees Someoka practicing, so he could later join the team, knowing about the FFI's special rule, where teams can change representatives between matches. Then the next night, they found out that Japan will play against the Australia's team, the Big Waves. The next day, they are told that they won't be practicing, and instead are being ordered to remain in their small rooms.
| 71 | "Raise the Curtain! A Challenge to the World!"; Transliteration: "Kaimaku! Sekai e no Chōsen!!" (Japanese: 開幕!世界への挑戦!!) | February 24, 2010 | October 31, 2011 |
No matter what Endou and the others do, Coach Kudou won't let them out of the building they stay at. But for some reason, he lets Toramaru go home. Tsunami successfully sneak out when the coach isn't present, but Endou and the others aren't so lucky. Meanwhile, a group of people come looking for Tobitaka, and Kudou gave him permission to go out. Endou is so impatient that he starts practicing in his room, and soon all the others do so too. Finally the day of the match come, and Inazuma Japan are quickly overwhelmed by Big Waves Hissatsu tactics: Box Lock Defense. Will they be able to break the defense before the match is over?
| 72 | "Overcome Big Wave!"; Transliteration: "Biggu Weibu o Norikoero!" (Japanese: ビッグウェイブを乗り越えろ!) | March 3, 2010 | November 1, 2011 |
The match of Inazuma Japan and Big Waves continues, but with one point in the lead favored to Big waves. Kidou Yuuto finally breaks through the hissatsu Tactic; Box Lock Defense but it seems that the strategy now changes. Will Japan pull through the match? Will Tsunami Jousuke be able to complete his new shoot hissatsu and will Endou Mamoru be able to block the shoot hissatsu; Megalodon?
| 73 | "Scorching Warriors! Desert Lion!"; Transliteration: "Shakunetsu no Senshi! Dezāto Raion!!" (Japanese: 灼熱の戦士!デザートライオン!!) | March 10, 2010 | November 2, 2011 |
Inazuma Japan next game is against Qatar's team, Desert Lion. Everything seems to be fine as the first half ends with Japan taking a two-point lead. But what they don't know is that they have unknowingly fallen into Desert Lion's trap!
| 74 | "Awaken, Sleeping Tiger!!"; Transliteration: "Nemureru Tora! Mezameru Toki!!" (Japanese: 眠れる虎!目覚める時!!) | March 17, 2010 | November 3, 2011 |
Hiroto and Tsunami were too much fatigued that they were switched by Tachimukai and Tobitaka. Fubuki was also fatigued but pushed on and used Wolf Legend again to shoot but it was blocked by the catch hissatsu; Storm Rider and Fubuki finally was too fatigued that he fainted on the field. Bjorn Kyle acknowledged them to stay this long but he stated that they can withstand this and wondered how long Inazuma Japan can handle this heat.Fubuki was switched by Toramaru and he was able to easily get the ball and got past the opponents. He was about to shoot but he remembered how he was shunned by his old teammates and he passed it back to Gouenji but it was cut off. Tachimukai got the ball off Desert Lion somehow. Fudou kept on complaining to which Kudou stated that if he has a problem, he stated that Fudou should get out of the bench. Toramaru was able to get the ball again and Gouenji said. to Toramaru to shoot but he remembered how he was shunned again and Toramaru passed the ball to Gouenji yet again and he used Bakunetsu Storm to score a goal but was blocked by the catch hissatsu; Storm Rider. Gouenji became angry again that Toramaru didn't shoot. Hibiki stated that Toramaru held back his plays because his old teammates couldn't handle his skillful plays and because of that, he was shunned, so he had no other choice but not to show his true potential. Bjorn Kyle now shot using his shoot hissatsu; Mirage Shoot. Endou blocked it with Seigi no Tekken G3. Though they tried to shoot again, but it was a surprise shoot so it made it through the goal making the score 2-2.Toramaru had the ball again but he passed it again to Gouenji, who finally lashed out his anger at Toramaru and asked why he didn't shoot. He stated that if he kept on only assisting, everyone can score and play happily but Gouenji stated that kind of soccer wasn't fun. He stated that everyone can handle his plays since all of them are the strongest of Japan and that they were now fighting the best of the world so he had to do his real plays. Endou stated that he should play it real and encouraged him. Toramaru asked if it was okay and Gouenji stated that he must try and surprised them. Tobitaka and Kazemaru blocked Desert Lion and Kidou passed the ball to Toramaru. Toramaru amazingly easily got past three defenders. Toramaru now scored a goal using a shoot hissatsu that he stated that he sealed up for a long time called Tiger Drive. It breaks past Storm Rider and scores a goal. Everyone in the team was amazed and happy for Toramaru. Gouenji stated that he still had some catching up to do if that's how serious he played to which he stated that wasn't his serious play. Kidou noticed that his personality had changed. Toramaru stated that Gouenji should get ready since he might get the ace's seat. Kabeyama wondered why he wasn't in the FF to which Toramaru answered that he was only a 6th grader in elementary to which surprised everyone.
| 75 | "A Serious Match! Endō and Tobitaka!!"; Transliteration: "Shinken Shōbu! Endō to Tobitaka!!" (Japanese: 真剣勝負!円堂と飛鷹!!) | March 31, 2010 | November 4, 2011 |
The episode starts with Inazuma Japan practicing and Toramaru showing off his skills. Afterwards, their coach; Kudou Michiya states that they have enough practice but Midorikawa objected though he learned his lesson during the last match and had to rest. Endou Mamoru goes to Tobitaka Seiya and asks if he has also rested with the other teammembers to which Tobitaka states that he prefers to do it alone. Fudou Akio comes in and both Tobitaka and Fudou seemed to almost have a fight but was stopped by Endou. Afterwards, Tobitaka goes to the usual place and practice with Hibiki guiding him. More about Tobitaka's past is revealed when Hibiki states that Tobitaka reminds him of himself when he was young. Tobitaka used to be a gangster and he was cornered and he tried to defeat them all even though he was outnumbered. He was known as "Toby the Kicker" and had strong kicks but because he was outnumbered he was about to be beaten up until Hibiki came in and saved him. Ever since then, Tobitaka was grateful to Hibiki and Hibiki also asked that he should use his kicking skill for a good purpose, mainly he asked that he should play soccer.Later, Endou goes to Rairaken to ask Hibiki some advice so that he can get to know Tobitaka more. Both talk and Endou thanks Hibiki, though when Endou left, Hibiki had a rough time breathing. Later, Endou receives a call from Hibiki and asks him to go to a certain place and that he will know what to do when he arrives. It is revealed that Hibiki was actually in a hospital, this reveals that he has a coronary disease. When Endou reaches the place where Hibiki said that he must go to, he sees Tobitaka practicing but Tobitaka leaves to practice somewhere else. Endou goes to the riverbank in which Tobitaka was practicing and he was determined to help Tobitaka. He states that Tobitaka should view soccer as something fun. Then after some time, with Endou, he masters how to control the ball and how to kick. Tobitaka thanked Endou and asked not to tell anyone of his practice to which Endou understands. Tobitaka remembers what Hibiki said that soccer is fun to which Tobitaka was now more encouraged.
| 76 | "Replacement Representatives!? The Strongest Challengers!"; Transliteration: "Daihyō Kōtai!? Saikyō no Chōsen-sha-tachi!!" (Japanese: 代表交代!?最強の挑戦者たち!!) | April 7, 2010 | November 7, 2011 |
As the episode starts, it first shows Midorikawa, exhausted, practicing alone at the night. He has flashbacks from when Tsunami Jousuke was able to use The Typhoon and score a goal against Big Waves and when Utsunomiya Toramaru made a goal against Desert Lion using Tiger Drive. Due to the improvement of the team, Midorikawa felt that he had to improve also. He tried yet again to shoot shooting but failed and became angry at himself.The next day, Kidou Yuuto explains to the team that they need to create new hissatsu techniques for their final preliminary match. He then states that Kazemaru Ichirouta should learn and master a hissatsu technique because when Kazemaru passed by Tsunami in the selection match, he caused a strong wind. Afterwards, he also asks Fubuki Shirou and Hijikata Raiden to do a combination shoot hissatsu technique. Kidou explained that, with Fubuki's speed and Hijikata's stable body balance, a combination hissatsu technique would be a powerful weapon. Fubuki and Hijikata were encouraged to do so. Midorikawa ate his bread silently watching the team happily talking about creating hissatsu techniques. Tsunami declared that he and Kabeyama should try a combination hissatsu also, and Kidou agreed. Kogure Yuuya snickers that he can't expect that much from this combination, referring to how happy Tsunami is while Kabeyama is worried. Finally, Endou announces that they should start practicing, and everybody happily agreed. Midorikawa placed down his bread thought for a while.Hijikata and Fubuki try creating a shoot hissatsu technique but encounter problems. Fudou is annoyed by Kidou's plan to arrange combination hissatsu, saying "So what about combination hissatsu techniques". Then it is shown that Midorikawa tried to get the ball from Toramaru but fails. Toramaru passes the ball to Tobitaka who failed to intercept it and the ball bounces off to Otonashi Haruna, almost hitting her in the face. Tobitaka then fixes his hair and Megane says that he shouldn't fix his hair all the time. Kiyama Hiroto sees Midorikawa fatigued and worries about him. The scene shifts to Kazemaru creating his hissatsu technique, then to Tsunami and Kabeyama, who are also practicing. After practice, the team is eating at the cafeteria. Kabeyama attempts to finish his food while ignoring Tsunami, but Tsunami encourages him to eat more for the hissatsu effort, causing Kabeyama to lose his appetite. Kogure added spicy sauce to Hijikata's food, making everyone laugh. Midorikawa was about to eat but lost the will to do so; Kiyama asks if he can sit beside Midorikawa. At nighttime, Endou sees both Midorikawa and Kiyama practicing. Midorikawa states that he was weak and he should not have been chosen. Kiyama tells Midorikawa that he was overextending himself and a flashback of Aliea Gakuen members playing soccer appears in Midorikawa's mind. Kiyama encourages Midorikawa to play his own strong soccer and the two continued practicing.During practice the next day, Midorikawa was able to get the ball from Toramaru, claiming that he will play and show his soccer. Fubuki and Hijikata continue practicing their shoot hissatsu, while Kazemaru is also practicing his hissatsu. Tobitaka's unfinished hissatsu develops further as well.The next day, Neo Japan comes and asks to have a match against Inazuma Japan to get the representative seat, surprising everyone. Kudou Michiya agrees to this and the two teams have a match. Kidou admits to Gouenji, "Who would've thought we'd play against Coach Hitomiko like this". Hiroto looks at his "sister" wondering what she is thinking. While conversing, Kidou and Gouenji's notice that Desarm is now a midfielder... Hitomiko remembers her flashback at Sun Garden, especially Desarm's expression when he pleads for her to help him participate in the FFI after he was not invited for the Japan nationals selection match.Meanwhile, Inazuma Japan is having trouble against Neo Japan's surprisingly tight defense. Toramaru sees an opening and passes it to Fubuki who used Wolf Legend, only to have it stopped by Drill Smasher V2. Then Saginuma uses Illusion Ball Kai to get past Kidou. Hijikata uses Super Shikofumi but is blown away by Dash Storm V2. Everyone is shocked that the members of Neo Japan were using the other members' original techniques. Arata then uses Gungnir V2 and gets past Seigi no Tekken G3. Neo Japan leads one point against Inazuma Japan.
| 77 | "Ultimate Showdown! Kudō Japan vs. Hitomiko Japan!!"; Transliteration: "Kyūkyoku Taiketsu! Kudō Japan VS Hitomiko Japan!!" (Japanese: 究極対決!久遠ジャパンVS瞳子ジャパン!!) | April 14, 2010 | November 8, 2011 |
Neo Japan continues to attack aggressively with powered-up hissatsu techniques, and Inazuma Japan can't get past their defense. However, this will only make Endou's passion for soccer grow stronger, and in turn encourage his teammates more. Will this be enough to take down Neo Japan's tough defense?!
| 78 | "Fuyuka's Ultimate Secret Plan!"; Transliteration: "Fuyuka no Kyūkyoku Ōgi Daisakusen!!" (Japanese: 冬花の究極奥義大作戦!!) | April 21, 2010 | November 9, 2011 |
Even though Seigi no Tekken had just evolved, Coach Kudou tells Endou that he'll never make it to the world tournament the way currently is. Endou thinks that the coach is telling him to learn a new Hissatsu, one that surpasses the Seigi no Tekken. Fuyuka notices a troubled Endou and learns some 'tips' from Rika to help him get ideas. What she doesn't know is that Rika is using this opportunity to plan a date for them. Fuyuka found out Rika's plan during the date when all of her 'tips' failed. Their planned 'date' was closely watched by Rika, Touko, Kabeyama, Kurimatsu, Kazemaru and Midorikawa. Then everything is fine in the end. Fuyuka and Endou talk while he trains, she looks at his grandfather's notebook and surprisingly is able to read it. Endou then gets an idea for his new hissatsu.
| 79 | "Gōenji's Determination!"; Transliteration: "Gōenji no Ketsui!" (Japanese: 豪炎寺の決意!) | April 28, 2010 | November 10, 2011 |
Gouenji has a big problem, his father wants him to quit soccer and become a doctor. What's more, he also wants Gouenji to withdraw from going to the nationals and go to Germany instead to study medicine. This is the reason that has kept him from focusing on practice, and interferes with Gouenji and Toramaru's new combo technique, Tiger Storm. And Gouenji's mood is so bad he keeps blaming it on Toramaru. Then, Gouenji's father contacts the chairman of Raimon and requests for Gouenji's withdrawal from Inazuma Japan. And as he is Gouenji's guardian, they cannot refuse him and must follow his wishes. Gouenji also stated that it would not be easy to change his father's mind, regardless of what everybody else thinks. What will Gouenji's decision be? Will he refuse his father or withdraw from the team?
| 80 | "The Last Game"; Transliteration: "Saigo no Shiai" (Japanese: 最後の試合) | May 5, 2010 | November 11, 2011 |
As the Asia finals draw near, Inazuma Japan are training hard to complete their new techniques. While they're practicing, a letter was sent to Endou, which shocks him and the team because the writing on it is similar to Daisuke's. A fight between Tachimukai and Megane has started. Later in the night, Endou runs into Gouenji, and is told by him about his quitting soccer after the next match. Endou tries to persuade Coach Kudou, later Gouenji's father to let him continue soccer, but fails. Coach Kudou then orders them to practice on a mud field till their game with Fire Dragon. Inazuma Japan doesn't understand why they must practicing on the mud field but they are still practicing on the mud field. On the day of the match, while they're on the way to the stadium, they have to stop because of a group of people who are blocking the way.
| 81 | "The Strongest in Asia! Fire Dragon!!"; Transliteration: "Ajia Saikyō! Faiā Doragon!!" (Japanese: アジア最強!ファイアードラゴン!!) | May 12, 2010 | November 11, 2011 |
Though there is trouble, Inazuma Japan manages to get to the stadium in time. At last, the finals against Korea's team, Fire Dragon, has begun. However, Inazuma Japan has some surprises waiting for them. First: Aphrodi, Suzuno and Nagumo are all in Fire Dragon, along with Korea's most highly acclaimed game strategist - Choi Chang Soo. Second: Endou won't be playing because according to Coach Kudou, Coach Kudou told him he doesn't need him, not in this team. Because he doesn't understand the team's situation, therefore he fails as captain. And third: Fire Dragon's powerful tactics which will crush Inazuma Japan, and they have no idea about it!
| 82 | "The Perfect Strategy! Perfect Zone Press!!"; Transliteration: "Kanzen naru Senjutsu! Pāfekuto Zōn Puresu!!" (Japanese: 完全なる戦術!パーフェクトゾーンプレス!!) | May 19, 2010 | November 14, 2011 |
Inazuma Japan manages to score a goal with their new combination shot, Thunder Beast. However, their rejoices are short-lived, because Fire Dragon decides to use Perfect Zone Press which takes down Fubuki and Tsunami, who are then switched out. Things only start to get tough as Fire Dragon now attacks with full power, and turns the tide of the match. And after the first half ends, Coach Kudou decides to switch Fudou in for an injured Kidou, Coach Kudou claims that their opponents doesn't know about Fudou and says that Fudou is "Their Joker". Will this turn the situation around?
| 83 | "Get Up, Captain!"; Transliteration: "Tachiagare Kyaputen!" (Japanese: たちあがれキャプテン!) | May 26, 2010 | November 15, 2011 |
Things aren't looking well for Inazuma Japan: the recently switched-in Fudou isn't working with his teammates, leading them to fight among themselves; Gouenji and Toramaru still can't use Tiger Storm; Tobitaka is still trying too hard not to make mistakes, which causes him to make even more. After seeing all this, and hearing about Fudou's past, Endou is finally able to give his answer, he knew it was his fault that he didn't watch the team, and he steps out to the field. The teamwork between the team and Fudou is finally linked, which lead to them scoring a point. However, Endou has to solve their remaining problems, or they'll never win this game.
| 84 | "Obtain It! The Ticket to the World!!"; Transliteration: "Te ni Irero! Sekai e no Kippu!!" (Japanese: 手に入れろ!世界への切符!!) | June 2, 2010 | November 16, 2011 |
The match starts with Fire Dragon in possession of the ball, Terumi then attempts to score a goal with God Break, but fails since Endou Mamoru blocks it with Seigi no Tekken G5. Megane stated that now Endou is on the field, Endou can block any shoot. But that's when Fire Dragon becomes serious, Terumi then shoots again, but this time he uses Chaos Break instead of God Break and scores a goal again. Fire Dragon is in the lead with 3 goals. Terumi, Suzuno and Nagumo high five as they had secured the point with their combination shoot. Toramaru then talks for a while Gouenji, stating that he does not want the match to end without scoring a goal with Tiger Storm, but Gouenji is still having a hard time to focus. Afterwards, the ball is taken away from Tobitaka and Nagumo charges in but Kabeyama states that he will not move and uses The Mountain to block Nagumo.But Fire Dragon still charges on and they try to use Chaos Break again but Kazemaru dashes in and passes the ball to Tobitaka but fails to get it. Afterwards, Endou talks to Tobitaka and encourages him to try playing with everything he has, and after this, he releases this new hissatsu, Shinkuuma and gets the ball.The ball then passes to Kiyama Hiroto and he evolves Ryuusei Blade further into V2 and scores a goal and ties in with Fire Dragon. But Fire Dragon still continues, and Terumi uses Chaos Break again, but Endou is determined to bring everyone to the international level, so he comes up with a new hissatsu technique, Ikari no Tettsui and blocks Chaos Break. Then, Gouenji and Toramaru try Tiger Storm two times but failed. That's when Endou and the others talk to Gouenji. Then, afterwards, Gouenji is encouraged to try it again, then finally, they score a goal with Tiger Storm and Inazuma Japan is in the lead. But, The captain of Fire Dragon, Choi Chang Soo, says that it isn't over yet, then try to score a goal by using Chaos Break but it is blocked by Ikari no Tettsui. Then, finally Japan won the Asia preliminaries and will advance to the international level.Gouenji's father approaches him and talks to him stating that Gouenji is allowed to still play soccer to which made the team happy, now all that's left is to go to the international level.
| 85 | "It's Here! World Finals!!"; Transliteration: "Kita ze! Sekai Taikai!!" (Japanese: 来たぜ!世界大会!!) | June 9, 2010 | November 17, 2011 |
Inazuma Japan are ready to leave for Liocott Island in the Inazuma Jet. Soon after they arrive, Endou finds a letter from his room from Natsumi. He goes to the beach to meet her, and learns that his grandfather is still alive. Then Endou goes to look for a tire for training, and runs into one of Italy's player. Then the opening ceremony, which marks the beginning of the FFI's World Tournament, begins with ten teams that have won the preliminaries entering one by one. Now the question remains, which one of them will stand at the top of the world?.
| 86 | "Surprise! This is World Class!!"; Transliteration: "Kyōgaku! Kore ga Sekai Reberu da!!" (Japanese: 驚愕!これが世界レベルだ!!) | June 16, 2010 | November 18, 2011 |
Inazuma Japan receives an invitation for a friendly exchange party from their next opponent, England's Knights of Queen. Later, they accept it. While training, Fideo finds Endou and asks to practice together. Later, Argentina's Teres came. Later, America's Mark and Dylan joins them, talking about Ichinose talking big about Endou. While preparing for the party, they found out that Endou isn't with them. Then Aki finds Endou, with other people, playing with them. She watched them play, until she found out that it's already late.Then they hurry to the party grounds. The heel in Aki's shoe got broken, and Endou gave her a piggy-back ride.When they arrived, Endou still wears his jersey. Then Fuyuka introduces both Endou and Edgar to each other, and Edgar calls his butler, Sebastian, to bring Endou a tuxedo and Aki a pair of shoes.As Endou goes out and calls his teammates, Edgar made fun of him, which made everyone unhappy. Endou and Edgar then have a match to see if he can stop Edgar's shoot, but loses because Edgar's Excalibur is too strong for his Ikari no Tettsui. Everyone was shocked seeing Edgar's shoot, but Endou's optimism made everyone more excited for the upcoming match.
| 87 | "The British Knights! The Knights of the Queen!!"; Transliteration: "Eikoku no Kishi! Naitsu Obu Kuīn!!" (Japanese: 英国の騎士!ナイツオブクィーン!!) | June 23, 2010 | November 21, 2011 |
The first match of FFI's Group A, Knights of Queen vs Inazuma Japan, has begun at Umihebi Stadium. Kabeyama and Endou managed to stop Excalibur thanks to the combined power of their techniques. But Inazuma Japan are in for some big troubles. Knights of Queen decide to use their hissatsu tactic, Absolute Knights, making it difficult for Inazuma Japan to attack. And when Edgar uses Excalibur again from a long distance, Kabeyama and Endou's combo plays can't stop it from going into the goal. It seems Excalibur is a shoot that actually grows in power the further it is from the goal. So what will Endou do when Edgar shoots Excalibur that uses the maximum length of the field?
| 88 | "Complete! My Original Finishing Move!!"; Transliteration: "Kansei! Ore Dake no Hissatsu-waza!!" (Japanese: 完成!俺だけの必殺技!!) | June 30, 2010 | November 22, 2011 |
Despite Edgar's strongest Excalibur, Endou saves the goal thanks to Kabeyama's great efforts. But because of that, he suffers a lot of damage, and is taken out. Someoka goes in to replace him, and scores with his new technique. Then, Knights of Queen decides to use their second Hissatsu tactics, Muteki no Yari, protecting Edgar and the ball while making it impossible to approach him. Edgar scores again with another of his technique, and England is in the lead once more. During half time, Endou meets the red cap man again, and he says something that might be an idea for Endou's new technique. But first, Japan must find a way to take down Muteki no Yari if they don't want to lose more goals.
| 89 | "Surpass Mugen the Hand!"; Transliteration: "Mugen za Hando o Koero!" (Japanese: ムゲン・ザ・ハンドを超えろ!) | June 30, 2010 | November 23, 2011 |
Tachimukai is amazed at Endou's new Ijigen The Hand. But this, along with Kogure's remark about Tachimukai copying Endou all the time, makes him determined to create a technique of his own. As a result, Tachimukai throws himself into harsh training. Haruna, later Kabeyama and Kurimatsu, offer to help Tachimukai when they discover him secretly training. Haruna later makes Kogure apologize to Tachimukai and help him train. But because all three are defenders, they can't make good shoots. Haruna then spots Tsunami surfing, so she calls him over to help out. They went a bit overboard, and Tachimukai passes out. But thanks to Endou and the others, Tachimukai regains his courage. And in the next practice, his new technique is starting to manifest. Meanwhile, Fudou runs into a man with sunglasses while jogging.
| 90 | "Teikoku's Curse! Part 1!!"; Transliteration: "Teikoku no Jubaku! Zenpen!!" (Japanese: 帝国の呪縛!前編!!) | July 7, 2010 | November 24, 2011 |
Kidou and Sakuma spot Fudou and the man with sunglasses, so they decide to go search for him to see if he really is Kageyama, but they can't find him. Kidou and Sakuma worry so much about it that they lose focus on practicing including Fudou, this caused coach Kudou to prevent them from training because of their lack of focus. Then, Fudou was nowhere in sight. Thinking that Fudou might try to contact Kageyama again, Kidou goes search for him. Sakuma goes after him too, and while searching, he runs into someone resembling Kidou. Then coincidentally, all three got into a bus, along with Endou who went searching for them and surprise to see Endou entering the bus. What will happen?? Tachimukai is practicing for his original hissatsu technique, Maou The Hand. Haruna, Tsunami, Kogure, Kurimatsu and Kabeyama help Tachimukai practise for his new hissatsu by taking shots at him and trying to inspire him. Kogure propose that they should make Tachimukai angry to fire him up, so Kogure starts mocking him with such words like "you wimpy goalkeeper", "clumsy", "blockhead", "gutless", "bird-brain". Although it might have fired him up at first, and given him a hint towards Maou The Hand, but then they just put him down for real. Tachimukai then tries to think what would Endou do at a time like this.
| 91 | "Teikoku's Curse! Part 2!!"; Transliteration: "Teikoku no Jubaku! Kōhen!!" (Japanese: 帝国の呪縛!後編!!) | July 14, 2010 | November 25, 2011 |
Italy's national team, Orpheus, has come across a big crisis: their coach has been replaced by the man with sunglasses who Endou, Kidou, Sakuma and Fudou are after. The man, calls himself Mr. K, fires Orpheus and replace them with Team K. Orpheus can't accept such an order, so Mr. K gives them a chance: they'll have a match with Team K, whoever wins will be Italy's national team. Soon after, eight of Orpheus's players are injured at roughly the same time, leaving only seven left. Fideo is also in danger, but he is saved by Kidou. He then tells Fideo that Mr. K might be Kageyama, and tells his past to Fideo. Endou then suggests all four of them join Orpheus temporary to help Fideo, but the other three all refuse. They then split up to search for Kageyama. Kidou happens to run into him, and hears that he will destroy Japan's national team. Kidou then decides to join Orpheus with the other three to find out the connection between Mr. K and Kageyama. What will happen in this match??
| 92 | "Terrifying! Another 'Kidou'!"; Transliteration: "Senritsu! Mōhitori no 'Kidō'!!" (Japanese: 戦慄!もう一人の「鬼道」!!) | July 21, 2010 | November 28, 2011 |
Endou and the others have confirmed their fear: Mr. K really is Kageyama. But that's not all, there's a player in Team K who resembles Kidou, not only in looks, but also in abilities, in which he even surpasses Kidou. Even though the new Orpheus made up of members from Inazuma Japan, are doing well as a team, Team K, especially the Kidou look-alike, is displaying overwhelming power. Demonio even scores with Koutei Penguin X, a far more powerful variation of the technique Sakuma used while he was in Shin Teikoku.
| 93 | "Strongest Confrontation! Penguin vs. Penguin!!"; Transliteration: "Saikyō Taiketsu! Pengin VS Pengin!!" (Japanese: 最強対決!ペンギンVSペンギン!!) | July 28, 2010 | November 29, 2011 |
The match that will decide Italy's team continues. Endou determines not to lose more goals, and blocks the second Koutei Penguin X with his own body. Then thanks to their teamwork, he scores with Megaton Head. After this, for some reason Demonio's plays are starting to fall apart. Why is he so obsessed with being the ultimate? The answer startles them. Demonio and the rest of the team were really wanted to be chosen as the representative team, but they lacked the skills, so Kageyama's offer for the ultimate power was irresistible... even with the risks, and one of them was losing eyesight! Will Endou be able to save them, and Orpheus from disbanding?
| 94 | "The Looming Fortress"; Transliteration: "Tachihadakaru Yōsai" (Japanese: 立ちはだかる要塞) | August 4, 2010 | November 30, 2011 |
Because of Mr. K, the match between Inazuma Japan and The Empire got pushed a day earlier. Fideo tried to help Endou and the others get to the boat that will take them to where the match will take place, Yamaneko Stadium. But an accident on the way prevents them from catching the boat on time. Having no captain or coach, Inazuma Japan will have to fight on their own. Endou and the others can do nothing but watching the match on TV. Without Endou or Kidou, Inazuma Japan pushes themselves too much to cover for their absence, causing their plays to fall apart in the process. Hiroto realizes this and pulls them together. However, that wasn't enough to get past Teres' defense. And to their surprise, The Empire changed from a defensive formation to an offensive one, quickly passes Japan's defense and gets the first goal.
| 95 | "Desperate! Inazuma Japan Defeated!?"; Transliteration: "Zettaizetsumei! Inazuma Japan Haiboku!?" (Japanese: 絶体絶命!イナズマジャパン敗北!?) | August 11, 2010 | December 1, 2011 |
The Empire manages to dribble through Inazuma Japan's defences; making quick passes that surprise Inazuma Japan's defenders, for The Empire was known to be a defensive team. Leone shoots Hellfire, and Tachimukai tries to stop it with Mugen The Hand G5, but fails. Aki notes that it should have been expected that The Empire would also have a good offense, for they could not have won all their matches with offence alone. Megane says that since The Empire's defense was so great, their offense ended up not getting as much attention.Inazuma Japan starts with a kickoff. Gordo Díaz uses Zigzag Flame, and steals the ball from Someoka. With The Empire back on the offense, the Inazuma Japan players are pushed back. Leone gets the ball again, and uses Hellfire. Tachimukai tries to use Maou The Hand, but it is incomplete, and The Empire scores.Hiroto passes the ball to Gouenji, but the ball is stolen from him. Kazemaru, determined not to let the ball get to Leone, kicks the ball out of bounds. However, this results in an injury in Kazemaru's leg, and he cannot continue to play. Tachimukai feels it's his fault, because he couldn't block The Empire's shoots. Kurimatsu joins the defense, replacing Kazemaru, and Tobitaka moves up as midfielder.With Hiroto as the captain, the match resumes. Kurimatsu quickly gets the ball, but it's stolen from him and passed to Leone. As Leone advances, Tachimukai worries on what to do. Mugen The Hand doesn't work, and Maou The Hand is incomplete. But Tobitaka tells him not to be afraid, that it's okay to mess up, as long as he gives everything he has. Tachimukai thinks about this. Leone jumps up and shoots Hellfire, and Tachimukai manages to stop it with Maou The Hand. The first half ends with The Empire in a two point lead. The team congratulates Tachimukai on completing his hissatsu; Tachimukai thanks Tobitaka for his help, who says he just thought it was something Endou would say. The second half starts with The Empire's kick-off. They kick the ball deep into Inazuma Japan's field, and Tsunami catches it. Tsunami passes to Gouenji, but Gouenji is quickly surrounded. The Empire uses their hissatsu tactic, Andes no Arijigoku. Surrounded, Gouenji can't pass to anyone. Gouenji moves up with a dribble, managing to keep the ball, but he can't get to his destination. Gouenji tries to score with Bakunetsu Screw, but it goes straight towards Teres, who stops it with his hissatsu, Iron Wall.Someoka retrieves the ball, but gets caught in Andes no Arijigoku. He gets through, but ends up right in front of Teres as well, and has the ball stolen from him. Kidou understands their tactic. The Empire lets the dribbler move up while guiding him towards Teres, like an ant lion dragging down an ant that's fallen into its pit. Whatever shoot Inazuma Japan makes, Teres will be there to stop it. Toramaru shoots with Tiger Drive, but Teres stops it with Iron Wall.Elsewhere, Coach Kudou says that this is good for them. Until now, Inazuma Japan has gone by with Kidou planning their strategies, and with Endou for support. But because of that, the rest of the team have ended up relying on the two. Kudou says they need to use their own abilities to overcome this situation, so they would be worthy to stand at the top of the world.Noticing how everyone's lost hope, Fuyuka runs up. She tells them that the match isn't over yet, so why are they giving up? Isn't it Inazuma Japan's soccer to never give up? Haruna and Aki cheer them on. Kurimatsu asks Hiroto to let the defenders take care of the situation. The defenders say that they'll pass the ball to the forwards, who should stay at a place Teres can't get to. Tachimukai says not to worry that the defense would be left open, because he'll protect the goal. Hiroto agrees. The match resumes with Inazuma Japan's throw-in. Tsunami gets the ball and passes to Kogure, who dribbles up the field. The Empire's members surround him. Kabeyama and Kurimatsu tell him to move more to the right. Kogure manages to pass the ball to Kabeyama. The opposing team surrounds him. Kabeyama manages to get through them and passes to Kurimatsu. The ball is stolen from Kurimatsu, but he gets it back and passes to Gouenji, hurting his foot a bit in the process. Hiroto says it's time for their new technique. He, Gouenji and Toramaru move up and use Grand Fire. Teres moves to stop it but doesn't get there in time, and they score, breaking The Empire's record of no points lost.The match ends soon after, with the score in The Empire's favor.After the match, Endou and the others return an explain everything. Gouenji apologizes because the team couldn't win. Endou tells them to cheer up! There's still hope, they can still win. Kidou says as long as they win all their other matches, they still have a chance. Endou complements them all for their plays. But they say it was because of Fuyuka. She helped them remember how they should never give up until it's over. The episode ends soon after.
| 96 | "Fuyuppe's Secret"; Transliteration: "Fuyuppe no Himitsu" (Japanese: フユッペの秘密) | August 18, 2010 | December 2, 2011 |
At night, in her bedroom, Fuyuka sat on her bed. Coach Kudou was there, too. The next day, Inazuma Japan's private plane landed at the Liocott airport. Someone got off the plane, smiling. Inazuma Japan practiced passionately. Megane explains FFI the game system, and said that if they want to pass the qualification, they should not lose again. When they were training, the ball had rolled out of the field. The ball rolled to someone's feet, who was Fubuki. All members of the Inazuma Japan seemed surprised and happy to see the return of Fubuki. With the return of Fubuki, then someone has to leave the team, who was Kurimatsu. Someoka told him to go home and practice, so he could go back into the team. Then, Inazuma Japan seemed to watch the match between Orpheus and the Knights of the Queen. Orpheus who was initially left behind, managed to take the lead around thanks to the instructions of Mr. K. Knowing this, Endou, Kidou, Sakuma, and Fudou train harder in order not to lose to Kageyama, which made them not being able to practice well. Coach Kudou then told them to stop the exercise to calm down. Since there is no exercise, Endou accompanied Fuyuka to go shopping. Heading home after shopping, a truck almost hit them. They both survived, but Fuyuka fainted after seeing the accident. Then Endou brought Fuyuka to the hospital. At the hospital, Coach Kudou told Endou about Fuyuka's past, that her parents died in a car accident. Fuyuka was very traumatized, so the doctor advised to do hypnotherapy. Therefore Fuyuka lost her childhood memories, and forgot Endou as well. The next day, Kidou and members of other Inazuma Japan apologized to Coach Kudou about their practice yesterday. Finally, that day they returned training. In the afternoon, Aki got a call from Ichinose, asking Aki to meet him somewhere.
| 97 | "Ichinose! The Final Kick-off!!"; Transliteration: "Ichinose! Saigo no Kikkuofu!!" (Japanese: 一之瀬!最後のキックオフ!!) | August 25, 2010 | December 5, 2011 |
Inazuma Japan is fired up for their next match against America's Unicorn, especially Endou. Because they'll get to fight Ichinose and Domon, both of whom have leveled up greatly. The next day, Ichinose calls Aki out, and tells her, he will join a Pro League youth soccer team after the tournament, so he won't lose to them. But what Aki doesn't know is that he lies to her, and in reality, the soccer he loves will be taken from him again!
| 98 | "All-Out Friendship! Ichinose vs. Endō!!"; Transliteration: "Zenryoku no Yūjō! Ichinose VS Endō!!" (Japanese: 全力の友情!一之瀬VS円堂!!) | September 1, 2010 | December 5, 2011 |
Not long after the match starts and Unicorn has the first point because of Ichinose's new Pegasus Shot. The match continues with Ichinose making superior plays, giving Inazuma Japan a hard time. But thanks to Fubuki and Kazemaru's new combo shoot The Hurricane, Japan ties with America. During half time, Endou accidentally finds out about Ichinose's surgery, but decides not to hold back, as a symbol of their friendship.
| 99 | "The Phoenix's Determination"; Transliteration: "Fushichō no Ketsui!" (Japanese: 不死鳥の決意!) | September 8, 2010 | December 6, 2011 |
The tense game between Inazuma Japan and Unicorn continued with neither side wanted to give up. When one team took the lead, the other took it back, this is what the game had become. Unicorn finally decided to use the Hissatsu tactics, Rolling Thunder, continuously attacking Japan's defenders, eventually wore them down. Then, Unicorn scored another goal with Gran Fenrir, bringing them closer to victory. What will Inazuma Japan do to breakthrough this situation?
| 100 | "Miracle! A Kappa Encounter!?"; Transliteration: "Kiseki! Kappa to no Sōgū!?" (Japanese: 奇跡!カッパとの遭遇!?) | September 15, 2010 | December 7, 2011 |
Endou wakes up to go to the bathroom and notices a kappa figure on his way, but when he rubs his eyes, its gone. The next day the others don't believe him with Hiroto telling him it's impossible because kappas are imaginary creatures, therefore don't exist. They all then leave to go to practice with Endou left wondering if it really was a kappa. Inazuma Japan then practices for their upcoming match against Orpheus. During practice the kappa looking boy is seen admiring Hiroto's Ryuusei Blade. After practice, Hiroto decides to go for a short run in the nearby forest, as he thinks his dribbling won't be able to break past Orpheus' defense. Kogure Yuuya, had been looked down by Someoka Ryuugo earlier on, pulls a prank on the latter. He ends up being chased after by an angry Someoka, and runs into the same forest Hiroto is currently in. While practicing Hiroto notices a kappa looking boy watching him from behind a tree. Before he can do anything he hears Kogure calling for help and runs to see what's wrong. He then finds Kogure wrapped in vines. They encounter a kappa-looking boy, who wants an autograph from Hiroto. Both Hiroto and Kogure decide to camp out in the forest because they can't find a way back. The next morning, they met the kappa boy from before, along with his friend. They lead Hiroto and Kogure to a soccer field, and wanted to play with them. These fans aren't what they appeared to be, however. Hiroto and Kogure are having troubles as they lost more and more points, but maybe that will help Hiroto develop the flexibility he needs.
| 101 | "Duel! Tiger and Hawk!!"; Transliteration: "Gekitotsu! Tora to Taka!!" (Japanese: 激突!虎と鷹!!) | September 22, 2010 | December 8, 2011 |
Firstly, after practicing, the Inazuma Japan members receive letters from their friends and family from their hometown. They received some letters from Midorikawa, and surprisingly a really long letter from Saginuma to which they just showed a funny expression when they read it. Also Tobitaka received a note and photo of his friends encouraging him to which he smiled. Finally, Toramaru received a letter but he looked pale when he read it. During the practice, he couldn't concentrate to which the other members suggested him to concentrate to which he answered with an angry reply and stormed off. At night, Endou decided to talk to him about his problem, surprisingly, Tobitaka said he'll talk to Toramaru instead. Toramaru, outside was still worried about the letter he received and was surprised that Tobitaka came to talk to him to which Toramaru stated that Tobitaka wouldn't understand his situation though after some talking, Toramaru stated what the letter he contained stated. Apparently his mother's sickness is worse than before and Toramaru is feeling guilty because he is faraway from his mother. Tobitaka gave some advice and Toramaru smiled and removed his tears. The next day, Toramaru learns a new hissatsu called RC Shoot.
| 102 | "Memories Return! The Truth of Fuyuka!!"; Transliteration: "Yomigaeru Kioku! Fuyuka no Shinjitsu!!" (Japanese: よみがえる記憶!冬花の真実!!) | October 6, 2010 | |
Inazuma Japan is in a worrying situation: only the top two teams in each group will pass the prelims, and their next opponent is currently in first place. If they don't win this, it's likely that Japan won't pass the prelims. Therefore, Coach Kudou decides to hold a practice game with Spain's Red Matador, who is also in the same situation. During the game, Fuyuka keeps seeing the image of Endou's young self. After the game, Fuyuka finds Endou at the beach training, and talk to him about the game. Suddenly, her memories comes back. And eventually, she remembers the accident which took away her parents. Unable to bear it, Fuyuka falls into a coma. Is there no way to save her other than to use hypnotherapy again? Is there nothing Endou can do to keep Fuyuka from having to forget him and the others over again?
| 103 | "Battle at Last! Fidio's Decision!"; Transliteration: "Iyoiyo Kessen! Fidio no Ketsui!!" (Japanese: いよいよ決戦!フィディオの決意!!) | October 13, 2010 | |
Inazuma Japan are preparing for their match against Orpheus, as the important game will take place tomorrow. Then Fuyuka is seen talking with Furukabu about something that is not yet revealed but they said that if they found it is would change the power balance of the world tournament. Then while training Kidou has a flashback of him talking to Kageyama who told him that he will destroy Inazuma Japan at Italy's area. The Italian team is seen training with Mr. K but no one other than Fideo could complete Kageyama's training, The rest of the team thought this training had no meaning because even though they won against England they tied with America because of Mr. K's commands, they still don't acknowledge him as their coach. And couple with the fact that they heard about the bad things he had done to Endou and others, they decided that they will fight using their own soccer. Later on Fideo is seen receiving package from the captain. It was a video of a match between the Japan National team and the Korean National team and Fideo was amazed by Japan's plays. The next day, the match between Orpheus and Inazuma Japan begins, and gets intensify almost immediately after it'd started. But Orpheus seems to have a fight between Fideo and the rest, which is why Japan makes the first point so soon.
| 104 | "Strongest Tactics! Catennacio Counter!!"; Transliteration: "Saikyō Takutikusu! Katenachio Kauntā!!" (Japanese: 最強タクティクス!カテナチオカウンター!!) | October 20, 2010 | |
After Inazuma Japan's early goal, many of Orpheus's members still didn't want to listen to Fideo because he trusts Mr. K, which is why Japan continued to get the better of them. Though Fideo even saved them from potentially losing another point, most of them didn't seem to appreciate what he has done and didn't listen to his orders. Fideo, believing Mr. K could take them to a new level, begged his team to put their trust in him for five minutes, which they accept, because Blasi said that they will agree with it. Whatever was on everyone's mind, they'll be shocked at the plays Fideo is going to pull out, and the Hissatsu tactics which even shake Mr. K from his composure!
| 105 | "Decisive! Endō vs. Fidio!!"; Transliteration: "Nettō! Endō VS Fidio!!" (Japanese: 熱闘!円堂VSフィディオ!!) | October 27, 2010 | |
Fideo's plays which is out of this world, Kageyama and the past he's been freed from, and Orpheus which has become complete as a team, all of which has allow Italy to complete the powerful hissatsu tactic: Catenaccio Counter. Not only they block every one of Inazuma Japan's attacks, they also takes the lead with Fideo's Odin Sword. Unless Japan break through Catenaccio Counter, they won't have a chance at victory.
| 106 | "The Final Battle! Kageyama Reichi!!"; Transliteration: "Saigo no Kessen! Kageyama Reichi!!" (Japanese: 最後の決戦!影山零治!!) | November 10, 2010 | |
The match between Inazuma Japan and Orpheus now heads into the second half. Italy's captain, Hide Nakata, has finally returned, which give the rest of the team an emotional boost. They even evolved Catenaccio Counter with Nakata joining them. There's no doubt that Italy's team right now is the strongest ever. How will Japan handle this absolutely flawless Orpheus? And what will Kageyama's fate be after this game?
| 107 | "Grandpa's Last Note!"; Transliteration: "Jī-chan no Saigo no Nōto!" (Japanese: じいちゃんの最後のノート!) | November 17, 2010 | |
The last game in Group A, The Empire vs Unicorn, are coming to an end with The Empire in the lead. Since the match between Inazuma Japan and Orpheus has ended in a tie, Orpheus has been guaranteed first place in Group A, while Japan are anxiously waiting for the results as they couldn't advance with their own wins. Unicorn doesn't make it in the end, meaning Japan can go to the finals tournament. The good news doesn't stop there, Daisuke's last notebook has made it way to Endou thanks to Fuyuka's memories and the help of Natsumi. However, it doesn't have ideas for Hissatsu techniques, but contains sayings which gave Fuyuka's dad courage and strength of heart. Though they don't know what those sayings mean, they definitely take them seriously as Kidou said that as long as they keep those words in mind, they'll be able to figure it out somehow. Meanwhile, Touko and Rika are planning to pay them a surprise visit.On the way, Rika stops to buy more souvenirs from two old men, who give them two bracelets called "the keys to the legend" for free. Rika put one on, only to find out later that she can't take it off, the same goes for Otonashi when Touko give her the other one. Just what are these bracelets supposed to be? It seems another great drama is about to begin!
| 108 | "The Legend of Raiokotto Island!"; Transliteration: "Raiokotto-tō no Densetsu!" (Japanese: ライオコット島の伝説!) | November 24, 2010 | |
After hearing about the legend of Liocott Island from Natsumi, and seeing the similarity between the two bracelets and the ones wore by the heaven and hell dwellers, Inazuma Japan goes back to practice. Later, they're visited by Fideo Ardena, who brought along Teres, Mark, Dylan, and Edgar. All of them come to express their wish for Italy and Japan's victory. They then decided to have a game with the five visitors and Touko join in to make twenty two players. Just when they start, thunder roars and clouds start rolling in when it was supposed to be sunny all day. Then the two bracelets, worn by Rika and Haruna started glowing, followed by a lightning strike, and a being with a strange outfit, Sein, appeared. Sein then hypnotized Rika to come with him, but Endou interfered. Annoyed, Sein shoots a ball straight to Endou, getting him out of his way. Then another one with a different outfit, Desuta, appeared to take Haruna, which Kidou interfered, but was then hurt by Desuta and Haruna was hypnotized as well. Later, Sein and Desuta have a conversation, in which some words indicate they're from heaven and hell. After that, both of them disappeared, taking Rika and Haruna along. Then, everyone was shocked and remembered of what Natsumi told them before. Was the legend of Liocott Island true after all?
| 109 | "Messengers of the Sky!"; Transliteration: "Tenkū no Shito!" (Japanese: 天空の使徒!) | December 1, 2010 | |
The episode begins with the Red Team running on the path to Heaven's Garden in order to save Rika. While staying at Heaven's Garden's palace, Rika tries to find a way to escape. She attempts to do so by going out of the window, however she stops because of the height. Ekadel then enters the room, noticing that Rika is awake. Rika then gets scared as he notices the open window, however he closes it and says that the morning breeze isn't good for her health. Enolel and Sakinel then enter the room with a tray of food, which Ekadel explains that it's Rika's breakfast. She is hesitant to eat at first but then gives in and enjoys the food. Ekadel then tells Rika to come with them to the purification room once she has finished eating to change into her demon bride clothes. While Sein is looking at a mural somewhere in the palace, Winel comes in and tells him that the revival of the demon lord has finally come. Sein then questions why their ancestors used soccer to settle their battles with the demons. Upon the Red Team's, Elfel comes in and tells Sein that they have guests. As the Red Team finally arrives at Heaven's Garden, Winel states that they can't start the ritual with them interfering. When the Red Team sees Sein and his accomplices, Sein declares to them that they should leave in which they refuse. Sein then explains that Rika is to be wed to the demon lord, which shocks the Red Team. After arguing, Tenkuu no Shito and the Red Team have a soccer match. During the match, the Red Team has a hard time playing against Tenkuu no Shito and Sein quickly scores a goal using Heaven Drive. His shot leaves the Red Team astonished at Tenkuu no Shito's power. After some of the Red Team's members successfully pass Tenkuu no Shito's, Edgar tries to score a goal with Excalibur but Enolel stops it using Holy Zone. The Red Team then starts block and intercept Tenkuu no Shito's passes and Kazemaru manages to use Fuujin no Mai. He then passes to Fideo, who successfully scores a goal using Odin Sword. During half-time, Sein says that they underestimated the Red Team and it was time to show them the true power of heaven.During the second-half, Tenkuu no Shito shows their true power which gives the Red Team a hard time. Guel then shoots multiple times at Endou to tire him. This ceases as Touko manages to stop one of her shots using The Tower. As Sein uses Heaven Drive again, Edgar runs towards it in order to reflect it using Excalibur. Rika then pleads to him not to do it, since he'll will get severely injured. Edgar then says that he'll risk his leg in order to protect a lady and uses Excalibur. Tenkuu no Shito is left astonished and Excalibur makes a goal, resulting in the Red Team's victory with a score of 2-1. Rika is then released and runs to Edgar, whose leg luckily didn't break. After losing, Sein finally realizes why his ancestors used soccer in their battles as Rika tells him soccer is the clashing of souls against souls. He then thanks Endou and states that his team will use their fierce souls in order to seal the demon lord. Now the Red Team had Otonashi to worry about as Endou says "we're counting on you, Kidou".
| 110 | "Demon Army Z!"; Transliteration: "Makai Gundan Z!" (Japanese: 魔界軍団Z!) | December 8, 2010 | |
The White Team heads for Demon's Gate, where Makai Gundan Z is, to rescue Haruna. These guys want her to be a sacrifice to revive the demon lord. Of course, Kidou won't allow them to have their way with his sister, so a game is inevitable. But it soon becomes clear that the devils' monstrous power is too much for them and time is ticking. Can they save Haruna?
| 111 | "The Devil's Decent! Dark Angel!!"; Transliteration: "Maō Kōrin! Dāku Enjeru!!" (Japanese: 魔王降臨!ダークエンジェル!!) | December 15, 2010 | |
Endou and others has saved both Rika and Otonashi, but it's not over yet. There's still one more obstacle to overcome: Dark Angel, the fusion of heaven and hell, and the demon lord himself. Inazuma Japan has to fight another battle with their souls on the line, which are what Dark Angel wants in order to make themselves even more perfect as the demon lord. Endou and others quickly finds themselves struggling against the destructive power of Dark Angel. Will they all perish? Or will they live to go to the finals?
| 112 | "The Kingdom's Darkness!"; Transliteration: "Za Kingudamu no Yami!" (Japanese: ザ・キングダムの闇!) | December 22, 2010 | |
The final match in Group B: Brazil's The Kingdom vs France's Rose Griffon, has ended with The Kingdom winning overwhelmingly. This amazing team is also Inazuma Japan's opponent in the semi-finals. Everyone, especially Endou, are excited to play against them. But their captain, Mac Roniejo, comes to Endou with a shocking proposal. He wants Inazuma Japan to lose in the semi-finals. They find out that Garshield told the players that they have to win every match, or else something will happen to their families. Hijitaka, Endou, Hiroto and Kidou sneak in and copy the data from Brazils camp base. It seems that Garshield had planned to take over the world? what will happen?
| 113 | "Garshield's Conspiracy!"; Transliteration: "Garushirudo no Inbō!" (Japanese: ガルシルドの陰謀!) | January 5, 2011 | |
Inazuma Japan are astonished by the data they stole from Garshield's mansion, which revealed his plan to take over the world. If they give the data to the police, Garshield will definitely go to jail, and The Kingdom will be able to play their own soccer. Coach Hibiki volunteers to take the data to the police, while Endou and Hijikata go to tell The Kingdom good news. However, Hibiki wasn't able to do it because he has another chest pain while he had some as shown in various episodes before, which was caused by a heart condition. Nonetheless, the data made it to the police. But to their horror, Garshield appears at the stadium where the match will begin. He had pulled the string with the police and got away and as soon as the match starts, Roniejo's expression becomes odd. Has the plan RH begun?
| 114 | "Inazuma Japan vs. The Kingdom"; Transliteration: "Inazuma Japan VS Za Kingudamu" (Japanese: イナズマジャパンVSザ・キングダム) | January 12, 2011 | |
Everytime Roniejo hears a special whistle he acts different and can't seem to shoot correctly! His teammates worry about him, as he gets angry whenever someone touches him, and so does Inazuma Japan because they both understand that it is unlikely for Roniejo to steal the ball from his teammates, which he does in the game. So they leave their mark on the forwards and stop Roniejo from getting the ball. It is revealed that the whistle activates the RH program. Later the detective arrests Garshield and Brazil is able to play their own soccer. However before he left Garshield threatened all the players families.
| 115 | "The Soccer Kingdom's Revenge!"; Transliteration: "Sakkā Ōkoku no Gyakushū!" (Japanese: サッカー王国の逆襲!) | January 19, 2011 | |
The match continues from the previous episode, however, Roniejo and the others from The Kingdom seem to not be able to find the will to play, only making small passes between each and not attempting to shoot. After scoring one point, Hijikata tells Roniejo not to worry about his family and that they sent him here to play soccer not because they could keep their jobs but because they wanted him and his teammates to be able to play soccer. Roniejo is then convinced and begins to show off his true abilities. The skills of both teams evolved to a greater level and this episode is also the debut of a new hissatsu technique: The Birth, a shot performed by Kiyama Hiroto and Fubuki Shirou. Inazuma Japan wins with a score of 3-2 and will now proceed to the finals against either Orpheus or Little Gigant.
| 116 | "Amazing! Little Gigant!!"; Transliteration: "Kyōi! Ritoru Giganto!!" (Japanese: 驚異!リトルギガント!!) | January 26, 2011 | |
Inazuma Japan hurries to the match of Orpheus Vs. Little Gigant to see if Fideo's team has won. Though when they reached the match it already ended and it had a surprising score... it was 0-8 and Orpheus lost and hadn't score a single goal to which the Inazuma Japan members could not believe. Then after the match, Endou went inside the room of the Orpheus seeing them badly beaten with bruises. Also all of the members seemed to be down at spirits. He sees that Hidetoshi Nakata was comforting them to which Endou comforted them also. Fideo stated that the match was a hard match. Firstly he stated that the goalkeeper of Little Gigant did not even use a hissatsu to block the hissatsu of Raffaele. Then Fideo stated that he wants to fight Endou in the finals no matter what, so even though Fideo was tired he tried getting a goal by using Odin Sword but the goalkeeper just blocks it even without a hissatsu. After that Fideo states that he doesn't have the right to become the captain of Orpheus and wanted to give back the position to Nakata but Nakata stated that he should keep the position. Though even with Endou comforting, Orpheus was still depressed with their loss. The next day, Endou sees Natsumi in Liocott Airport and is surprised that Natsumi is now a manager of Little Gigant.
| 117 | "Attack! The Ultimate Enhanced Humans!"; Transliteration: "Shūgeki! Kyūkyoku no Kyōka Ningen!!" (Japanese: 襲撃!究極の強化人間!!) | February 2, 2011 | |
Suddenly, a mysterious group attacks the Cotarl's area on Liocott island. Little Gigant and Inazuma Japan rushes off to help and is surprised to see that Garshield is there and he brought his own soccer team! Then Endou finds out that the coach of Little Gigant, Mr. Araya is actually his grandfather, Endou Daisuke! Then Garshield challenges Inazuma Japan to a match. What will they do?
| 118 | "The Terrifying Team Garshield!"; Transliteration: "Kyōfu no Chīmu Garushirudo!!" (Japanese: 恐怖のチームガルシルド!) | February 9, 2011 | |
Endou Mamoru is not able to block the Garshield's enhanced human team attacks with his 真 Ijigen The Hand and his teammates are working hard in the field to make the goal. On the other side Endou Daisuke, Rococo, Natsumi and others are hoping that the team will be able to show something to the enemy. Natsumi is calmly observing Team Garshield's weaknesses and making strategies in her mind as Daisuke advised her. Inazuma Japan is not able to put the ball into the goal even with their new hissatsu tactics Dual Typhoon, as the goalkeeper of Team Garshield blocks Toramaru's Gladius Arch, after which team Garshield's captain goes for the goal. Now all eyes were focused on Endou if he will he be able to block the shoot, just at that time Daisuke shouts these words to Endou "GAN SHAN DWAN". Endou starts thinking about the words after which he gets the point to gather energy and suddenly unleashes the power inside him, tried to stop the coming shoot. But the new move was less powerful to stop the ball as it goes straight into the goal, after which the first half ends. Now all the players gathers and Endou Daisuke tells them the strategy that Natsumi made during the first half. All the players were shocked when they heard the strategy, according to that Tobitaka and Kabeyama will go as forwards and the forwards Gouenji and Toramaru will be midfielders, Fudou and Kazemaru will go as defenders. Because leaving physical abilities Team Garshield have a weakness that their forwards acts as forwards, midfielders plays as midfielder and defenders do the work of defenders. As their complete separation of roles their defenders lack the abilities of a midfielder to keep the ball and or bringing it up to front. To break through that mixing up defenders and midfielders is important. So, according to the strategy as the second half started players went to their positions. They scored with Tiger Storm, The Hurricane and Grand Fire G2 respectively.
| 119 | "The Strongest Rival!"; Transliteration: "Saikyō no Raibaru!" (Japanese: 最強のライバル!) | February 16, 2011 | |
Rococo Urupa's past was finally revealed as he tells his story to Endou. Endou is still practicing to find the key to the new hissatsu. Gouenji and Toramaru try a new hissatsu too and Rococo shows Endou he has the same hissatsu like him! God Hand. Endou was surprised. Rococo's hissatsu is stronger than his. Will Endou give up? Will he find the key of the hissatsu in this episode?
| 120 | "Fidio's Great Friendship Training!"; Transliteration: "Fidio no Yūjō Daitokkun!" (Japanese: フィディオの友情大特訓!) | February 23, 2011 | |
Fideo Ardena thinks about the recent match their team, Orpheus, had against Little Gigant, and how he lost in the end, even though he used Odin Sword. He remembered the score match, it was 8-0 and Orpheus lost. Fideo laments that he cannot fight Endou Mamoru and Inazuma Japan in the finals anymore. The next day, Endou Mamoru practices and tries to create a new hissatsu technique for their finals match. He tries by practicing with a tire again but fails. Fideo slowly approached Endou, and when Endou turned around he saw Fideo. Kidou Yuuto and Sakuma Jirou practiced by running around and they saw Gigi Blasi and the whole Orpheus team. Fideo asks Endou to carry on for them and win the match as the number 1 team in the world. Endou and Fideo talk and afterwards Fideo states that he came to help because of Blasi's suggestion to help out Inazuma Japan.Gigi and Fideo explains that the movements of Little Gigant were without excess and their speed was terrifying. When they tried their tactic, it didn't work. To win against them, they had to suppress the power and speed of Little Gigant.Orpheus will have match against Inazuma Japan to show them how Little Gigant fights. Though, it will only be a 15 minutes match. Kidou is shocked at the formation of Little Gigant has and watches the match closely. Fideo scores the first goal with Odin Sword Kai. Endou's hissatsu is still incomplete and was unable to catch the hissatsu.After watching the match closely, Kidou comes in the field and was able to break through the defense line and use Koutei Penguin 3gou G2 and Gouenji Shuuya uses Shin Bakunetsu Screw creating a chain shoot and score a goal even when Blasi used Colosseo Guard Kai. Fideo afterwards scores another goal and Endou's hissatsu is still incomplete. Fideo encourages Endou one more time and talks about Endou's hissatsu techniques. Fideo then shoots again, this time surprising everyone when they saw it evolve to Shin Odin Sword. Endou then tries to block it with a much more visualized hissatsu but it is still incomplete. Though, Endou still thanks Fideo for the training and because he finally had a grasp of his hissatsu. Everyone thanks Orpheus and the team wishes them best of luck for their upcoming match against Little Gigant
| 121 | "To the Top of the World! The 11 Words!"; Transliteration: "Sekaiichi e! 11 no Kotoba!!" (Japanese: 世界一へ!11の言葉!!) | March 2, 2011 | |
Inazuma Japan received a video call from Raimon in Japan, where they were surprised to know how many members they have. Handa says that the fact that most of the Inazuma Japan representatives are from Raimon have gained them popularity, and the number of the soccer club members increases every day. They also show the new clubroom rebuilt by the chairman, which most of the materials came from the old clubroom. The Raimon team cheers for them, and Endou and the Inazuma Japan players thanked them. Later, Kidou, Someoka, Hiroto, and Kazemaru are seen practicing, and Fubuki came. Working hard for Raimon, Fubuki thought that the Hakuren team may feel the same way. Then they talked about Endou and how he grew stronger. Then the rest of the Inazuma Japan players, except for Endou and Gouenji, came.In the attic of the lounging house, Endou stared at the Raimon Soccer Club's doorplate, and Gouenji finds him there. They were happy that the soccer club earned so many members. Then Endou reminisced of the past, when he started playing soccer:Back then, when Endou was still a kid, he was cleaning the house for the New Year's Eve. In a large cabinet, he found a notebook, and when he read it, he felt a shock as if he was struck by a lightning. Because of that, he started playing soccer. His mom was against it, but his stubborn nature made his dad convince her to let Endou play.Entering Junior High school, he decided to join a soccer club. However, he found out that there was no soccer club. So he found a soccer club, together with his classmate, and found an old clubroom. Then the two of them cleaned the room, and waited for members. For the whole year, they were only four of them, with Someoka and Handa. The next year, there were four more members, who were Kabeyama, Kurimatsu, Shishido, and Shourinji, who were all freshmen.The next day, Fuyuka brought a notebook, which was the notebook of Daisuke given to her father. Also, Endou let Fuyuka keep it. The four managers tried to read the notebook, but they remembered that the notebook is illegible for them. Hearing this, Otonashi remembered that she took down the meaning of the notebook while Endou read them aloud, and the four recalled them all. Later, they practiced for the last time in preparation for the match with Little Gigant. Fubuki said that he takes the Heart #7 from Daisuke's notebook, which is the forgiving strength. Also, the Little Gigant are getting ready for the finals. Daisuke is also looking forward for the match as he wishes good luck for both his grandson and Rococo.
| 122 | "Inazuma Japan's Final Battle!"; Transliteration: "Inazuma Japan Saigo no Tatakai!" (Japanese: イナズマジャパン最後の戦い!) | March 9, 2011 | |
Everyone in Inazuma Japan started to train more and more for their upcoming match since that match is the final one. The managers cooked some food for the others, and Hibiki talked to Kudou and stated that he entrusted the team to him. Afterwards, Natsumi and Endou talked. Afterwards, Endou stated that he looked forward to the match, much to Natsumi's surprise. Then, the first half later started. With this, Inazuma Japan tried to shoot by using Bakunetsu Screw but failed to score a goal. Afterwards, they tried to use Route of Sky but it was broken through also. Then, shockingly, Little Gigant used their tactic and afterwards scored a goal.Natsumi then stated that God Catch was still incomplete.
| 123 | "Showdown!! Little Gigant (Part 1)"; Transliteration: "Chōjō Kessen!! Ritoru Giganto Zenpen" (Japanese: 頂上決戦!!リトルギガント・前編) | March 23, 2011 | |
The match starts as in the first half as Inazuma Japan uses a hissatsu to take a point but Rococo used God Hand X and blocked it easily. The afterwards Rococo kicks the ball from afar but Endou stops the shot and realizes it is a challenge from Rococo. Then Drago uses Double Jaw and scores the first point. Everyone is surprised and finally Little Gigant attacks using one hissatsu after another, but Endou can't seem to block it. The others help him block it by forming a circle in front the goalpost, but many get injured because of this. Then Coach Kudou reminds him that he is the captain. Afterwards he understood what Coach Kudou meant and became able to block the move of Little Gigant with his new hissatsu called God Catch. Now it is Inazuma Japan's attack. Hiroto brings out his brand new hissatsu, Tenkuu Otoshi and wins a point. The first half ends with Inazuma Japan and Little Gigant tied.
| 124 | "Showdown!! Little Gigant (Part 2)"; Transliteration: "Chōjō Kessen!! Ritoru Giganto Kōhen" (Japanese: 頂上決戦!!リトルギガント・後編) | April 6, 2011 | |
Kidou steals the ball from Little Gigant and passes it on to Gouenji, Toramaru and Hiroto. They use the Grand Fire G2 to make a goal but at the same time the new goalkeeper of Little Gigant uses God Hand X 改 and stops it quite easily. Both Inazuma Japan and Little Gigant continuously attack. As the match goes on both the teams are evolving and new hissatsu are being seen continuously. Rococo again has the ball and he uses X Blast once more but this time Endou was able to stop it with his evolved God Catch. Finally Inazuma Japan is able to tie the score with Big Bang crushing 真 God Hand X. Rococo is again moved to the goalkeeper's position. He was also able to stop Big Bang with his new hissatsu Tamashii The Hand. Then the match continues and at the end of the episode, Rococo has attempted yet another goal by his X Blast V2, but he failed. The score is tied at 2-2.
| 125 | "Final Truth! Number One in the World!!"; Transliteration: "Tsui ni Ketchaku! Sekaiichi!!" (Japanese: ついに決着!世界一!!) | April 13, 2011 | |
Rococo goes back as goalkeeper and both teams are on the rage on winning the FFI! Endou catches Rococo's X Blast V3 with his evolved God Catch G3. The match starts and both teams are doing their best – Rococo stops any shot, even though Endou stops any shoot, but Little Gigant is more flexible. Finally the ball gets to Inazuma Japan. Coach Kudou tells Inazuma Japan his last word. He told them to enjoy themselves and Inazuma Japan understood what coach Kudou said so they started trying to enjoy the match. Endou encourages them. Finally, they won against Little Gigant.
| 126 | "A Tearful Graduation Ceremony!"; Transliteration: "Namida no Sotsugyō-shiki!" (Japanese: 涙の卒業式!) | April 20, 2011 | |
All of Inazuma Japan came home to Japan and went back to their respective places with a warm welcome. And now, the graduation ceremony starts. Endou Mamoru heads to the school along with Toramaru and Aki. All three remember the past, and Endou tells Toramaru how Raimon started out. After reaching Raimon, Gouenji joins them and also tells another story about when he first wore Raimon's uniform. Kidou also comes in and states that he used to be an enemy but now, they're all friends. Then the three: Kidou, Gouenji and Endou go to their graduation ceremony to which Toramaru commented that the three were close friends.The graduation ceremony begins and the principal started giving out the diplomas. When it came to Endou's turn, Endou saw that most of his friends were crying.After the graduation ceremony, Endou goes to the soccer club and is nostalgic yet again. Endou states that the new captain for Raimon is Kurimatsu, which made Kurimatsu nervous. Toramaru comments that he will be the new striker for Raimon.Fubuki, Tsunami, Kogure, Touko, Rika and some others come to Raimon so they could have a match with each other. Then a bus comes by and it is revealed that it is Teikoku Gakuen and they'll watch the match.
| 127 | "Kick-off to Tomorrow!"; Transliteration: "Ashita e no Kikkuofu!" (Japanese: 明日へのキックオフ!) | April 27, 2011 | |
The match is about to start when Teikoku Gakuen arrive at Raimon, startling them. But they came out of the vehicle and said that they came to watch the graduation match, as it was a special occasion. It was Raimon vs Raimon B and Natsumi announced the match to start. Kakuma Keita then arrived to commentate for the match. The match started with persistent tackling and dribbling, and more having fun than trying to win. Then all of the players have flashbacks of moments in their lives at Raimon. After a long while, everyone stops playing, and start talking about high school, and to make a new legend even if they are going to separate schools. The match resumes only for a few minutes, and ends at 0-0. Natsumi asks Endou as the former captain to make a closing comment, with Endou surprised, everyone else agrees. He makes his comment as: "Everyone, let's keep playing soccer!". Endou then says they should play another match, but this time, with Teikoku. Endou is heard talking/thinking to himself, saying that no matter how old he gets he'll never stop playing soccer, and he can't wait to see what the future holds for him.
