= 6th Otakebi Album =

Studio album by Berryz Kobo
- Released: 31 March 2010
- Recorded: 2009–2010
- Genre: Pop
- Label: Piccolo Town
- Producer: Tsunku

Berryz Kobo chronology
Berryz Kobo Special Best Vol. 1 (2009)	6th Otakebi Album (2010)	7 Berryz Times (2011)

Singles from 6th Otakebi Album
- 1. "Dakishimete Dakishimete" Released: 11 March 2009; 2. "Seishun Bus Guide/Rival" Released: 3 June 2009; 3. "Watashi no Mirai no Danna-sama/Ryūsei Boy" Released: 11 November 2009; 4. "Otakebi Boy Wao!/Tomodachi wa Tomodachi Nanda!" Released: 3 March 2010

Music videos
- "Dakishimete Dakishimete" on YouTube
- "Seishun Bus Guide" on YouTube
- "Rival" on YouTube
- "Watashi no Mirai no Danna-sama" on YouTube
- "Ryūsei Boy" on YouTube
- "Otakebi Boy Wao!" on YouTube
- "Tomodachi wa Tomodachi Nanda!" on YouTube

6th Otakebi Album (6th 雄叫びアルバム, Shikkususu Otakebi Arubamu; 6th War Cry Album) is the sixth studio album by the Japanese girl group Berryz Kobo. It was released on 31 March 2010 on the Piccolo Town label, and peaked at #12 on the weekly Oricon chart. The album was released in two editions: a normal edition and a limited edition. The first pressing of the normal edition contained a bonus photocard, while the limited edition came with a special DVD containing two versions of the PV for "Tomodachi wa Tomodachi Nanda!", as well as additional footage. Both editions also contained a ticket to the album's release event. The album features seven of the group's previous singles, as well as five original tracks.

The album's theme is "not a child, but not yet an adult."

== Track listings ==
All tracks are written by Tsunku.

CD
No.	Title	Arranger	Length
1.	"Otakebi Boy Wao!"	Yū Odakura	3:33
2.	"Rival" (ライバル)	Shōichirō Hirata	4:19
3.	"Ryūsei Boy" (流星ボーイ "Shooting Star Boy")	Dance Man	3:25
4.	"Ai ni wa Ai Desho" (愛には 愛でしょ "Love For Love, Right?", performed by Momoko Tsugunaga and Miyabi Natsuyaki)	Shōichirō Hirata	4:32
5.	"Seishun Bus Guide" (青春バスガイド "Youthful Bus Guide")	Kaoru Ōkubo	3:27
6.	"Kimi no Tomodachi" (君の友達 "Your Friends")	Nao Tanaka	3:42
7.	"Grand Demo Rōka Demo Medatsu Kimi" (グランドでも廊下でも目立つ君 "On The Ground, On The Hallway, You Stand Out", performed by Maasa Sudo and Yurina Kumai)	Shōichirō Hirata	3:41
8.	"Tomodachi wa Tomodachi Nanda!"	Yūsuke Ōba	3:52
9.	"Kibō no Yoru" (希望の夜 "Hopeful Night")	Kōichi Yuasa	5:21
10.	"Dakishimete Dakishimete" (抱きしめて 抱きしめて "Hold Me, Hold Me")	Kōtarō Egami	3:52
11.	"Yakimochi o Kudasai!" (ヤキモチをください！ "Give Me Your Jealousy", performed by Saki Shimizu, Chinami Tokunaga and Risako Sugaya)	Yoshimasa Fujisawa	4:52
12.	"Watashi no Mirai no Danna-sama" (私の未来のだんな様 "My Future Husband")	Shōichirō Hirata	3:39

Limited edition DVD
No.	Title	Length
1.	"Tomodachi wa Tomodachi Nanda!"
2.	"Tomodachi wa Tomodachi Nanda! (Close-up Ver.)"
3.	"Tomodachi wa Tomodachi Nanda! (Making-of)" (友達は友達なんだ！ （メイキング映像）)

== Charts ==
Chart (2010)	Peak position	Weeks on chart	Sales	
Chart (2010)	Peak position	Weeks on chart	First week	Total
Japan (Oricon Daily Albums Chart)	6			
Japan (Oricon Weekly Albums Chart)	12	3	8,950	10,795
