= Dakishimete Dakishimete =

Single by Berryz Kobo

from the album 6th Otakebi Album
- B-side: "Sono Subete no Ai ni"
- Released: March 11, 2009 (Japan)
- Genre: J-pop; EDM; electropop
- Label: Piccolo Town
- Songwriter: Tsunku
- Producer: Tsunku

Berryz Kobo singles chronology
"Madayade" (2008)	"Dakishimete Dakishimete" (2009)	"Seishun Bus Guide / Rival" (2009)

Music video
- "Dakishimete Dakishimete" on YouTube

"Dakishimete Dakishimete" (抱きしめて 抱きしめて) is the 19th single by the Japanese girl idol group Berryz Kobo. It was released in Japan on March 11, 2009, and debuted at number 8 in the weekly Oricon singles chart.

== Track listings ==
=== CD single ===
1. "Dakishimete Dakishimete" (抱きしめて 抱きしめて)
2. "Sono Subete no Ai ni" (そのすべての愛に)
3. "Dakishimete Dakishimete" (Instrumental)

Limited Edition DVD

1. "Dakishimete Dakishimete" (Close-up Ver.)

=== DVD single "Dakishimete Dakishimete" Single V ===
1. "Dakishimete Dakishimete"
2. "Dakishimete Dakishimete" (Dance Shot Ver.)
3. Making-of (メイキング映像, Making Eizô)

=== DVD single "Dakishimete Dakishimete" Event V ===
1. "Dakishimete Dakishimete" (Shimizu Saki Ver.) (抱きしめて 抱きしめて (清水佐紀 Ver.))
2. "Dakishimete Dakishimete" (Tsugunaga Momoko Ver.) (抱きしめて 抱きしめて (嗣永桃子 Ver.))
3. "Dakishimete Dakishimete" (Tokunaga Chinami Ver.) (抱きしめて 抱きしめて (徳永千奈美 Ver.))
4. "Dakishimete Dakishimete" (Sudo Maasa Ver.) (抱きしめて 抱きしめて (須藤茉麻 Ver.))
5. "Dakishimete Dakishimete" (Natsuyaki Miyabi Ver.) (抱きしめて 抱きしめて (夏焼雅 Ver.))
6. "Dakishimete Dakishimete" (Kumai Yurina Ver.) (抱きしめて 抱きしめて (熊井友理奈 Ver.))
7. "Dakishimete Dakishimete" (Sugaya Risako Ver.) (抱きしめて 抱きしめて (菅谷梨沙子 Ver.))

== Charts ==
Chart (2009)	Peak position
Japan (Oricon Weekly Singles Chart)	8
