= Seishun Bus Guide / Rival =

Single by Berryz Kobo

from the album 6th Otakebi Album
- Released: June 3, 2009 (Japan)
- Genre: J-pop
- Label: Piccolo Town
- Songwriter: Tsunku
- Producer: Tsunku

Berryz Kobo singles chronology
"Dakishimete Dakishimete" (2009)	"Seishun Bus Guide / Rival" (2009)	"Watashi no Mirai no Danna-sama / Ryūsei Boy" (2009)

Music video
- "Seishun Bus Guide" - YouTube "Rival" - YouTube

"Seishun Bus Guide / Rival" (青春バスガイド/ライバル) is the 20th single by the Japanese girl idol group Berryz Kobo. It was released in Japan on June 3, 2009, and debuted at number 4 in the weekly Oricon singles chart.

The song "Seishun Bus Guide" was used as an ending theme for the anime series Inazuma Eleven (since April 2009).

== Track listings ==
=== CD single ===
1. "Seishun Bus Guide" (青春バスガイド)
2. "Rival" (ライバル)
3. "Seishun Bus Guide" (Instrumental)
4. "Rival" (Instrumental)

Limited Edition A DVD

1. "Seishun Bus Guide" (Close-up Ver.)

Limited Edition B DVD

1. "Rival" (Dance Shot Ver.)

=== DVD single "Rival" Single V ===
1. "Rival"
2. "Rival" (Close-up Ver.)
3. Making-of (メイキング映像, Making Eizô)

=== DVD single "Seishun Bus Guide" Single V ===
1. "Seishun Bus Guide"
2. "Seishun Bus Guide" (Dance Shot Ver.)
3. Making-of (メイキング映像, Making Eizô)

== Charts ==
Chart (2009)	Peak position
Japan (Oricon Weekly Singles Chart)	4
