= Otakebi Boy Wao! / Tomodachi wa Tomodachi Nanda! =

"Otakebi Boy Wao!/Tomodachi wa Tomodachi Nanda!"

Single by Berryz Kobo

from the album 6th Otakebi Album
- Released: March 3, 2010 (CD); March 10, 2010 (Single V)
- Recorded: 2010
- Genre: Pop
- Label: Piccolo Town
- Songwriter: Tsunku
- Producer: Tsunku

Berryz Kobo singles chronology
"Watashi no Mirai no Danna-sama / Ryūsei Boy" (2009)	"Otakebi Boy Wao!/Tomodachi wa Tomodachi Nanda!" (2010)	"Maji Bomber!!" (2010)

Music videos
- "Otakebi Boy Wao! on YouTube
- "Tomodachi wa Tomodachi Nanda! on YouTube

Professional ratings
Review scores
Source	Rating
Hotexpress	Favorable

"Otakebi Boy Wao!/Tomodachi wa Tomodachi Nanda!" (雄叫びボーイ WAO!/友達は友達なんだ!, Otakebi Bōi Wao!/Tomodachi wa Tomodachi Nanda!; War Cry Boy Wao!/A Friend Is a Friend!) is the 22nd single by Berryz Kobo. The single was released on March 3, 2010, with the A-side Single V following on March 10. It was released in four editions: a regular edition, containing only the CD, and three limited editions, A, B and C. Limited editions A and B contained a bonus DVD, while edition C contained a special "Inazuma Eleven" trading card. All three limited editions included a serial number card, used in a promotional draw.

The single was Berryz' third double A-side single.

"Otakebi Boy Wao!" was used as the 4th ending theme for the Inazuma Eleven anime. and as an ending theme for the Nintendo DS game Inazuma Eleven 3.

The single sold 25000 copies in its first week and debuted in the Oricon Weekly Singles Chart at number 3, making it their highest-ranking single to date. It also stayed in the top 10 for a second week, ranking 9th.

== Details ==
Otakebi Boy Wao! Main vocals: Risako Sugaya, Momoko Tsugunaga, Miyabi Natsuyaki

Tomodachi wa Tomodachi Nanda Main vocals: Risako Sugaya Minor vocals: Momoko Tsugunaga, Miyabi Natsuyaki

== Track listings ==
CD

1. "Otakebi Boy Wao!" (雄叫びボーイ WAO!, Otakebi Boī Wao!; "War Cry Boy Wao!")
2. "Tomodachi wa Tomodachi Nanda!" (友達は友達なんだ!, "A Friend Is a Friend!")
3. "Otakebi Boy Wao! (Instrumental)"
4. "Tomodachi wa Tomodachi Nanda! (Instrumental)"

Limited edition A DVD

1. "Otakebi Boy Wao! (Close-up Ver.) (雄叫びボーイ WAO! (Close-up Ver.))

Limited edition B DVD

1. "Tomodachi wa Tomodachi Nanda! (Dance Shot Ver.)" (友達は友達なんだ! (Dance Shot Ver.))

== Charts ==
Chart (2010)	Peak position
Japan (Oricon Weekly Singles Chart)	3
