= Watashi no Mirai no Danna-sama / Ryūsei Boy =

"Seishun Bus Guide / Rival"

Single by Berryz Kobo

from the album 6th Otakebi Album
- Released: November 11, 2009 (Japan)
- Genre: J-pop
- Label: Piccolo Town
- Songwriter: Tsunku
- Producer: Tsunku

Berryz Kobo singles chronology
"Seishun Bus Guide / Rival" (2008)	"Seishun Bus Guide / Rival" (2009)	"Otakebi Boy Wao! / Tomodachi wa Tomodachi Nanda!" (2010)

Music video
- "Watashi no Mirai no Danna-sama" "Ryūsei Boy" on YouTube

"Watashi no Mirai no Danna-sama / Ryūsei Boy" (私の未来のだんな様/流星ボーイ) is the 21st single by the Japanese girl idol group Berryz Kobo. It was released in Japan on November 11, 2009, and debuted at number 5 in the weekly Oricon singles chart.

The song "Ryūsei Boy" was used as the 3rd ending theme for the anime series Inazuma Eleven.

== Track listings ==
=== CD single ===
1. "Watashi no Mirai no Danna-sama" (私の未来のだんな様)
2. "Ryūsei Boy" (流星ボーイ)
3. "Watashi no Mirai no Danna-sama" (Instrumental)
4. "Ryūsei Boy (Instrumental)

Limited Edition A DVD

1. "Watashi no Mirai no Danna-sama" (Close-up Ver.)

Limited Edition B DVD

1. "Ryūsei Boy" (Dance Shot Ver.)

=== DVD single "Ryūsei Boy" Single V ===
1. "Ryūsei Boy"
2. "Ryūsei Boy" (Close-up Ver.)
3. Making-of (メイキング映像, Making Eizô)

== Charts ==
Chart (2009)	Peak position
Japan (Oricon Weekly Singles Chart)	5
