= Dear Jubilee: Radwimps Tribute =

2025 compilation album by various artists

Compilation album by various artists
- Released: November 19, 2025
- Length: 64:50
- Language: Japanese
- Label: Muzinto; EMI
- Producer: Motoki Matsuoka; Sekai no Owari; Yaffle; 100kaiouto; ZTMY; My Hair Is Bad; H Zett M; Hiroji Miyamoto; Jun Murayama; Shu Kanematsu; N-buna; Ayase; Shuya Yamamoto; Vaundy; Yuichi Ohata; Hanaregumi; Go Haraga

Dear Jubilee: Radwimps Tribute is a tribute album featuring various artists commemorating the 20th anniversary of Japanese rock band Radwimps' major label debut. It was released on November 19, 2025, via Muzinto Records and EMI Records.

== Background ==
Shortly after the release of their fourteenth studio album, Anew, on October 8, Radwimps announced on October 20 that a tribute album would be released on November 19 in celebration of their 20th major label debut anniversary. The announcement was accompanied by the catchphrase, "We're glad we kept doing this thing called a rock band," a line from their song "Toaru Haru no Hi (トアルハルノヒ)".

On November 2, the band revealed the cover art for the tribute album. They also teased fourteen songs of theirs covered by various artists. The songs and artists participating were revealed each day from November 3 until November 17. Messages from each artist were also released.

On the album's initial announcement, vocalist Yojiro Noda tweeted:

It's been 25 years since we started the band, and 20 years since our major debut. Along the way, we've encountered countless landscapes and emotions we've never experienced before, but the 14 songs by these 14 artists are treasures I can never forget. I still listen to them all the time. The songs we created are played with colors and brilliance I've never heard before. It almost makes me forget to breathe. I'm truly grateful from the bottom of my heart.

== Cover art ==
The cover art was designed by Tetsuya Nagato, a longtime collaborator of the band. The artwork features Jack, the character who first appeared on the cover of the band's fifth album Altocolony no Teiri, now depicted sixteen years later. Nagato wrote on his Instagram:

Arutokoroni No Teiri was 2009. This is Jack, some sixteen years later. He, RAD, myself, everyone has aged. The world and people change, yet some things remain constant – it never stops, does it? I designed this while recalling RADWIMPS and the many fans encountered on tour. The CD booklet features imagery that could be seen as a continuation of Arutokoroni. I hope you enjoy it alongside the music.

== Release ==
Dear Jubilee: Radwimps Tribute was released digitally and physically on November 19, 2025. Additionally, each artist released their cover digitally under their own respective record label.

== Accolades ==
Awards and nominations for Dear Jubilee: Radwimps Tribute
Ceremony	Year	Award	Result	Ref.
Music Awards Japan	2026	Album of the Year	Nominated	

== Track listing ==
All tracks are written by Yojiro Noda.

Dear Jubilee: Radwimps Tribute track listing
No.	Title	Artist	Length
1.	"25 Kome no Senshokutai" (25コ目の染色体)	Mone Kamishiraishi	5:29
2.	"Saidaikōyakusū" (最大公約数)	Sekai no Owari	4:36
3.	"Tremolo" (トレモロ)	Kenshi Yonezu	3:20
4.	"Futarigoto" (ふたりごと)	Iri	4:39
5.	"Yūshinron" (有心論)	Zutomayo	4:09
6.	"Iindesuka?" (いいんですか？)	My Hair Is Bad	4:27
7.	"Oshakashama" (おしゃかしゃま)	Hiroji Miyamoto	3:29
8.	"Keitaidenwa" (携帯電話)	Dish	4:38
9.	"Kyōshinshō" (狭心症)	Mrs. Green Apple	6:50
10.	"Darma Grand Prix"	Yorushika	4:20
11.	"Kaishin no Ichigeki" (会心の一撃)	Yoasobi	4:00
12.	"Zenzenzense" (前前前世)	Vaundy	4:23
13.	"Sokkenai" (そっけない)	Hanaregumi	6:49
14.	"Suzume" (すずめ)	Hayato Sumino	3:42
Total length:			64:50

Notes

- "Darma Grand Prix" is stylized in all upper case lettering.

== Charts ==
=== Weekly charts ===
Weekly chart performance for Dear Jubilee: Radwimps Tribute
Chart (2025)	Peak position
Japanese Albums (Oricon)	5
Japanese Combined Albums (Oricon)	2
Japanese Rock Albums (Oricon)	1
Japanese Hot Albums (Billboard Japan)	1

=== Monthly charts ===
Monthly chart performance for Dear Jubilee: Radwimps Tribute
Chart (2025)	Position
Japanese Albums (Oricon)	12
Japanese Rock Albums (Oricon)	2

=== Year-end charts ===
Year-end chart performance for Dear Jubilee: Radwimps Tribute
Chart (2025)	Position
Japanese Albums (Oricon)	97
Japanese Digital Albums (Oricon)	9
Japanese Download Albums (Billboard Japan)	12

== Release history ==
Release history and formats for Dear Jubilee: Radwimps Tribute
Region	Date	Format	Version	Label	Ref.
Japan	November 19, 2025	CD; digital download; streaming	Original	Muzinto; EMI	
Various	November 19, 2025	Digital download; streaming	International	EMI	
