= Misoshiru's =

Japanese punk rock band

- Origin: Japan
- Genres: Punk rock; hardcore punk
- Years active: 2005-present
- Labels: EMI Records Japan
- Members: John; Paul; Makka; Tony
- Website: misoshiru-s.com

Misoshiru's (Japanese: 味噌汁’s, Hepburn: Misoshiruzu; "The Miso-Soups") is a Japanese punk rock band. A fictional stage persona for the band Radwimps that was created in 2005, the project was first unveiled in 2006 when Misoshiru's were the billed artist for the band's song "Jennifer Yamada-san". In 2013, Misoshiru's was revived, and released their debut album Me So She Loose through Universal Music Japan.

== Biography ==
The band's name was coined by drummer Satoshi Yamaguchi, during recording sessions where Radwimps switched musical instruments. Yamaguchi, then playing the role of the lead vocalist Yojiro Noda, announced the band as Misoshiru's. The band recorded their first song under the Misoshiru's name, "Jennifer Yamada-san" (ジェニファー山田さん, Jenifā Yamada-san; "Ms. Jennifer Yamada"), and included it as the B-side on Radwimps' 2006 single "Yūshinron". Misoshiru's performed during Radwimps' 2006 Sonata to Iku Fuyu Tour, where they performed "Jennifer Yamada-san" as well as "Yonaki", a song that had been featured as a hidden track on Radwimps' album Radwimps 4: Okazu no Gohan. Miso Shiru's performed at Radwimps' 2007 tour of Japan, Harumaki, when they came on stage during the final encore, acting as if Radwimps had been their opening act.

In 2013, the project was revived, when the band made a surprise performance at Radwimps' outdoor summer event Ao to Meme on September 15, 2013. Misoshiru's performed a new song "Nipponpon" (にっぽんぽん; "Japan-pan"), which was then featured on Radwimps' October single "Gogatsu no Hae" / "Last Virgin".

In March 2014, it was announced that the band was officially making their "major label debut" under EMI Records, with their debut album Me So She Loose to be released in May 2014. The album was preceded with a "note single", a paper slip sold exclusively at Tower Records featuring a download code for their song "Okan Gomen", which was adopted by the anime Majin Bone for the first ending theme song. Me So She Loose was promoted with the song "Otoshidama (Toudaimotokurashi)", which received a music video and received enough radio airplay to reach number 80 on the Billboard Japan Hot 100. On September 13, Misushiru's performed at the band Kishidan's annual summer music festival Kishidan Banpuku, performing eight songs.

In late 2014, Misoshiru's worked together with the Japanese miso soup producer Marukome, i a commercial campaign where they played rock music to fermenting miso paste to alter the taste. In July 2015, the band released Miso TV & Songs, a DVD compiling videos and live performances related to Misoshiru's, that came packaged with a bonus CD, featuring the new songs "Mesomeso" (メソメソ) and "Shimahokke" (シマホッケ).

== Band persona and reception ==
For the Misoshiru's side project, the band members adopted the pseudonyms John, Paul, Makka and Tony for Yojiro Noda, Akira Kuwahara, Satoshi Yamaguchi and Yusuke Takeda respectively. The band perform in a loose disguise by wearing Groucho glasses and red T-shirts that spell out the band's name.

Hirokazu Koike of Rockin' On Japan noted the band's "primitive happiness surging from their whole bodies", and felt that their music was "outstandingly thrilling Japanese rock 'n' roll". CDJournal reviewers praised the "brave and nonsensical lyrics" and the band's "short punk sound", and felt that while the songs were ridiculous, they were surprisingly catchy.

== Discography ==
=== Studio album ===
List of albums, with selected chart positions
Title	Album details	Peak positions
Title	Album details	JPN
Me So She Loose	Released: March 29, 2013 (JPN); Label: EMI Records Japan; Formats: CD, digital download	5

=== Promotional singles ===
Title	Year	Peak chart positions	Album
Title	Year	Billboard Japan Hot 100	Album
"Okan Gomen" ("Sorry Mom")	2014	—	Me So She Loose
"Otoshidama (Toudaimotokurashi)" (お年玉 〜TOUDAIMOTOKURASHI〜; "Otoshidama (Under the Lighthouse Is the Darkest Place)")	2014	80	Me So She Loose
"—" denotes items which did not chart.

=== Video albums ===
List of media, with selected chart positions
Title	Album details	Peak positions
Title	Album details	JPN DVD
Miso TV & Songs	Released: July 1, 2015; Label: EMI; Formats: DVD/CD	6

=== Other appearances ===
List of guest appearances that feature Misoshiru's.
Title	Year	Album
"Jennifer Yamada-san" (ジェニファー山田さん; "Ms. Jennifer Yamada")	2006	"Yūshinron" (Radwimps single)
"Yonaki" (夜泣き; "Night Tears") (Note: Featured as a hidden track.)	2006	Radwimps 4: Okazu no Gohan (Radwimps album)
"Jennifer Yamada-san" (live)	2007	Nama Harumaki (Radwimps DVD)
"Nipponpon" (にっぽんぽん; "Japan-pan")	2013	"Gogatsu no Hae" / "Last Virgin" (Radwimps single)
