= Dai Nana Shō 'Utsukushikutte Gomen ne' =

Dai Nana Shō "Utsukushikutte Gomen ne"
- Regular Edition cover

Studio album by Cute
- Released: February 8, 2012 (Japan)
- Recorded: 2011
- Genres: J-pop, pop
- Label: Zetima
- Producer: Tsunku

Cute chronology
Chō Wonderful! 6 (2011)	Dai Nana Shō "Utsukushikutte Gomen ne" (2012)	2 Cute Shinseinaru Best Album (2012)

Singles from Dai Nana Shō "Utsukushikutte Gomen ne"
- 1. "Momoiro Sparkling" Released: May 25, 2011; 2. "Sekaiichi Happy na Onna no Ko" Released: September 7, 2011; 3. "Amazuppai Haru ni Sakura Saku by Berryz Kobo × Cute" Released: November 9, 2011

Alternative cover
- Limited Edition cover

Dai Nana Shō "Utsukushikutte Gomen ne" (第七章「美しくってごめんね」) is the 7th album by the Japanese girl idol group Cute. It was released on February 8, 2012 in Japan on the record label Zetima.

The album contains three previously released singles: "Momoiro Sparkling", "Sekaiichi Happy na Onna no Ko", and "Amazuppai Haru ni Sakura Saku", the latter recorded in collaboration with Berryz Kobo. There also three solo tracks, performed by Mai Hagiwara, Chisato Okai, and Saki Nakajima.

The album debuted at number 8 in the Oricon Daily Albums Chart.

== Track listing ==
All tracks are written by Tsunku.

CD
No.	Title	Artist(s)	Length
1.	"Momoiro Sparkling" (桃色スパークリング)
2.	"Hitorijime Shitakatta Dake na no ni" (ひとり占めしたかっただけなのに)
3.	"Ike! Genki-kun" (行け！元気君)	Mai Hagiwara
4.	"Sekaiichi Happy na Onna no Ko" (世界一HAPPYな女の子)
5.	"Zuntaka March ~Hitorashiku Ikiyō~" (ズンタカマーチ～人らしく生きよう～)
6.	"Tokai no Neon ga Odoroku Kurai no Utsukushisa ga Hoshii" (都会のネオンが驚くくらいの美しさがほしい)	Chisato Okai
7.	"Kagayake! Hōkago" (輝け! 放課後)	Saki Nakajima
8.	"Shiawase no Tochū" (幸せの途中)
9.	"Amazuppai Haru ni Sakura Saku" (甘酸っぱい春にサクラサク)	Berryz Kobo×C-ute
10.	"Seishun Gekijō (°C-ute Ver.)" (青春劇場（°C-ute Ver.）)

Notes
The original version of "Seishun Gekijō", performed by Berryz Kobo×C-ute, was released on the Hello! Project compilation album Petit Best 12.

Limited Edition DVD
No.	Title	{{{extra_column}}}	Length
1.	"Album Jacket Satsuei Making" (アルバムジャケット撮影メイキング)	Album Jacket Photography Making of
2.	"Sekaiichi Happy na Onna no Ko (Yajima Maimi Solo Ver.)" (世界一HAPPYな女の子 矢島舞美 Solo Ver.)
3.	"Sekaiichi Happy na Onna no Ko (Nakajima Saki Solo Ver.)" (世界一HAPPYな女の子 中島早貴 Solo Ver.)
4.	"Sekaiichi Happy na Onna no Ko (Suzuki Airi Solo Ver.)" (世界一HAPPYな女の子 鈴木愛理 Solo Ver.)
5.	"Sekaiichi Happy na Onna no Ko (Okai Chisato Solo Ver.)" (世界一HAPPYな女の子 岡井千聖 Solo Ver.)
6.	"Sekaiichi Happy na Onna no Ko (Hagiwara Mai Solo Ver.)" (世界一HAPPYな女の子 萩原舞 Solo Ver.)

Notes
Tracks 2–6 were recorded at Berryz Kobo & C-ute Collabo Concert Tour 2011 Aki 'Berikyū Island'

== Charts ==
Chart (2012)	Peak position	Sales	
Chart (2012)	Peak position	First week	Total
Oricon Daily Albums Chart	8		
Oricon Weekly Albums Chart	15	6,841	8,171
Billboard Japan Top Albums	16		
