= Campus Life =

Campus Life may refer to:

- Campus Life (magazine), a United States Christian print magazine, now renamed to Ignite Your Faith
- "Campus Life (Umarete Kite Yokatta)", a song by the Japanese girl idol group Cute
