= Yorosen! =

- Genre: Edutainment
- Presented by: TV Tokyo
- Starring: Morning Musume; Cute; Berryz Kobo
- Country of origin: Japan
- Original language: Japanese
- No. of seasons: 1
- No. of episodes: 115

Production
- Production locations: Tokyo, Japan
- Camera setup: Multi-camera
- Running time: 7 minutes

Original release
- Release: October 6, 2008 – March 27, 2009

Related
- Haromoni@ Hello! Morning, Futarigoto, Musume Dokyu!

Yorosen! (よろセン!) was a late-night daily Japanese edutainment TV program featuring Hello! Project members as teacher and students. It aired on TV Tokyo from October 6, 2008, until March 27, 2009, on weekdays, with a running time of about 7 minutes. This show was a replacement for the show "Berikyū".

Yorosen showcased the three main groups of Hello! Project: Morning Musume, Berryz Kobo, and Cute. Each episode ended with a segment by Erina Mano.

== Concept ==
The show's name was a shortening of "Yoroshiku, Sensei!" (よろしくセンセイ!; roughly meaning "Pick Me, Teacher!"). Each week, one Hello! Project member would become the teacher to the other members of her group, often dressing in outfits related to the subject matter they were teaching. The subject matter ranged from world leaders to cute animals and everything in between. In Hello! Project TV tradition, shows relating to food often had the teacher or special student eating the food in question as the fellow members were forced to watch.

== Segments ==
Week	Teacher	Students	Subject
1	Reina Tanaka	Morning Musume	Prime Ministers
2	Koharu Kusumi	Morning Musume	Sumo
3	Ai Takahashi	Morning Musume	Edo period
4	Eri Kamei	Morning Musume	Tuna
5	Risako Sugaya	Berryz Kobo	Fantasy
6	Saki Shimizu	Berryz Kobou	Yakiniku
7	Momoko Tsugunaga	Berryz Kobo	Appliances
8	Airi Suzuki	Cute	'Golf
9	Saki Nakajima	Cute	"The greatest men in the world"
10	Yurina Kumai	Berryz Kobou	Fashion
11	Maimi Yajima	Cute	Side dishes
12	Erika Umeda	Cute	Christmas cooking
13	Risa Niigaki	Morning Musume	Coming of age
14	Aika Mitsui	Morning Musume	Pets
15	Linlin	Morning Musume	China
16	Kanna Arihara	Cute (with Sayumi Michishige)	Arts
17	Chisato Okai	Cute (with Sayumi Michishige)	Life lessons
18	Sayumi Michishige	Morning Musume	Railroads
19	Junjun	Morning Musume	National gourmet station-lunches
20	Miyabi Natsuyaki	Berryz Kobou	Games
21	Chinami Tokunaga	Berryz Kobou	Ecology
22	Maasa Sudo	Berryz Kobou	Table tennis
23	Mai Hagiwara	Cute	6-month highlights

There was also a segment where Mai Hagiwara teaches English, but it was probably never aired. The segment appears in the Yorosen! DVD Vol. 07.

== Controversy ==
On December 4, 2008, an episode featuring Cute aired that caused controversy. The show featured a discussion of Adolf Hitler in a segment called "The world's great people!" in which Hitler was casually called "Uncle Hitler" by Cute's members, who were also seen to do imitations of him and draw pictures of him. This forced both TV Tokyo and production company SSM to issue apologies. TV Tokyo issued a statement saying the show contained "Improper contents based on an insufficient knowledge of history." SSM issued a statement stating "The check system inside our company was lacking" and a "promise to be more careful in preventing a similar incident from happening again in the future". Soon after, it was announced that Yorosen! was to end, and that SSM would be ending their relationship with Hello! Project, believed to be over the "Hitler incident".
