= Chisato Okai =

Japanese musician, actress, and model

- 岡井 千聖
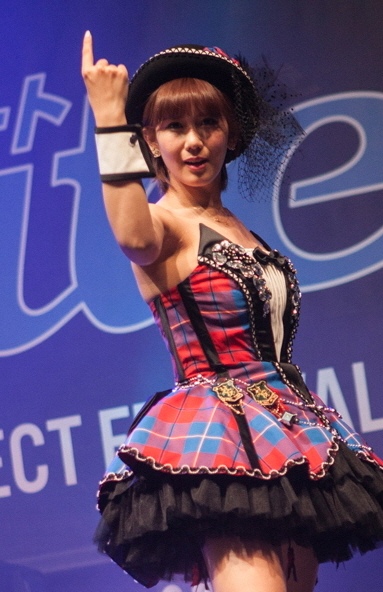
- Okai at Japan Expo 2014
- Born: June 21, 1994 (age 31); Saitama, Japan
- Occupation: Singer
- Musical career
- Genres: J-pop
- Years active: 2002-2020
- Label: Zetima
- Website: Hello! Project.com

Chisato Okai (岡井 千聖, Okai Chisato) (born June 21, 1994, in Saitama, Japan) is a former Japanese pop singer, actress, model, and television personality. She first gained recognition when she joined Hello! Project Kids and later became one of the main vocalists of the Japanese idol girl group Cute which she joined in 2005 and engaged in until 2017.

== Career ==
=== 2002–2005: Hello! Project Kids ===
In 2002, Okai auditioned for Hello! Project Kids with the song "Country Road" by Yoko Honna. Her audition tape was aired on Morning Musume's variety show Hello! Morning. She was placed in the group with fourteen other girls. In the same year, she appeared in the movie Koinu Dan no Monogatari.

=== 2005–2017: Cute ===
In 2004, Berryz Kobo was created with the intention of rotating all of the members of Hello! Project Kids to make time for school, but the idea was later scrapped, and the remaining girls who were not chosen were re-branded under the name Cute on June 11, 2005.

In September 2007, Okai was added to a new unit called Athena & Robikerottsu with Risa Niigaki, Aika Mitsui, and Saki Nakajima. They sang the opening and ending theme songs for the A-1 Pictures anime Robby & Kerobby. The unit was effectively disbanded in March 2008, entering into an indefinite hiatus when the series ended.

In 2009, Okai joined a newly formed unit called Tanpopo#, a revival of former Hello! Project unit Tanpopo, with Eri Kamei, Yurina Kumai, and Aika Mitsui.

On November 9, 2010, a solo video of Okai performing the dance to Cute's then-latest single "Dance de Bakōn" was released on the group's official YouTube channel. The video received more than 100,000 views in two days, and had received over 1.2 million views by May 2011. Following the video's success, more solo "dance-cover" videos of Okai were uploaded, including her cover of Aya Matsuura's song "Love Namidairo", which was released on iTunes on November 27 as Okai's first digital single. Her first solo live event, "Chisato Okai (Cute) Solo Live 2011 Vol.1: Kaisha de Odotte Mita!!" was held on January 25, 2011, at Pacific Heaven. A CD containing Okai's cover of Miki Fujimoto's "Romantic Ukare Mode", with "Love Namidairo" as the coupling track, was sold exclusively at the venue of her second solo live, but was also released digitally as part of Hello! Project's Hello Cover series.

In August 2016, Cute announced plans to disband in June 2017. Okai expressed interest in becoming a television personality on variety shows following disbandment.

She retired from the entertainment world on April 30, 2020.

== Personal life ==
Okia announced in April 2019 that she would be taking time off from all entertainment activities. She noted that she had been in entertainment for 17 years, and sought to experience life from outside of the industry.

Okai's sister, Asuna Okai, was a member of Hello Pro Egg.

In 2022, she married and gave birth to a baby.

== Discography ==
=== Singles ===
Title	Year	Peak position	Sales	Album
Title	Year	JPN	Sales	Album
"Love Namidairo"	2010	—	—	Digital single
"Egao ni Namida (Thank You! Dear My Friends)"	2010	—	—	Digital single
"Manatsu no Kōsen"	2010	—	—	Digital single
"Romantic Ukare Mode"	2011	—	—	Indie single
"Furusato"	2011	—	—	Digital single
"Oolong High no Onna"	2017	—	—	Digital single

=== Digital albums ===
- Okai Chisato Solo Collection Vol. 2 (2012)

=== Other solo songs ===
- Tokai no Neon ga Odoroku Kurai no Utsukushisa ga Hoshii (都会のネオンが驚くくらいの美しさがほしい) (February 2, 2012)
- Kimi wa Jitensha Watashi wa Densha de Kitaku (君は自転車 私は電車で帰宅) (Cute cover) (April 18, 2012)
- Kanashiki Heaven (Okai Part Version) (悲しきヘブン) (April 18, 2013)

== Appearances ==
=== Movies ===
- Koinu Dan no Monogatari (仔犬ダンの物語; "Puppy Dan's Story") (December 14, 2002)
- Hotaru no Hoshi (ほたるの星) (June 5, 2004)
- Ōsama Game (王様ゲーム) (December 17, 2011) as Kaori Maruoka
- Gomennasai (ゴメンナサイ) (2011)

=== TV series ===
- Tokusō Shirei! Aichi Police (特捜指令！アイチ★ポリス) (2011) as Mai
- Sūgaku♥Joshi Gakuen (数学♥女子学園) (2012)

=== TV shows ===
- Hello! Morning (ハロー! モーニング) (2002–2007)
- Haromoni@ (ハロモニ@) (2007–2008)
- Berikyǖ! (ベリキュー!) (2008)
- Yorosen! (よろセン!) (2008–2009)
- Bijo Gaku (美女学) (2010–2011)
- Hello Pro! Time (ハロプロ！TIME) (2011–2012)
- Hello! Satoyama Life (ハロー！SATOYAMAライフ) (2012–2013)
- GOGO! Smile! (ゴゴスマ) (2013–?)

==== Other ====
- 54th NHK Kōhaku Uta Gassen — backing dancer for Aya Matsuura (December 31, 2003)

=== Theatrical plays ===
- 34 Chōme no Kiseki-HERE'S LOVE- (34丁目の奇跡 -HERE'S LOVE-; "Miracle on 34th Street: Here's Love") (November 27 — December 28, 2004)
- 1974 (Ikunayo) (1974(イクナヨ)) (March 17–22, 2011)
- Stronger (ストロンガー) (2012)
- Theater in The Round (青山円形劇場) (2012)
- Sakura no Hanataba (さくらの花束) (2013) as Mei Koyamada

=== Solo events ===
- Chisato Okai (Cute) Solo Live 2011 Vol.1: Kaisha de Odotte Mita!! (岡井千聖（°C-ute）Solo Live 2011 Vol.1〜会社で踊ってみた!!〜; "... Dance Covers at Work!!") (January 25–26, 2011)
- Chisato Okai (Cute) Solo Live 2011 Vol.2: Hanzōmon de Odotte Mita!! (岡井千聖（°C-ute）Solo Live 2011 Vol.2〜半蔵門で踊ってみた!!〜; "... Dance Covers at Hanzōmon!!") (February 13–14, 2011)

=== YouTube ===
- "Dance de Bakōn!"
- "Ōkina Ai de Motenashite"
- "Forever Love"
- "Massara Blue Jeans"
- "Love Namidairo"
- "Yume Miru 15"

== Photobooks ==
No.	Title	Release date
1	Chisato (千聖): 1st solo photobook	December 24, 2010

=== Digital photobooks ===
- Alo-Hello! C-ute (Chisa Version) (アロハロ！°C-ute)) (October 5, 2010)
- Cutest (Chisa Version) (March 6, 2012)
- Alo-Hello! C-ute 2012 (Chisa Version) (アロハロ！°C-ute 2012)) (October 22, 2012)

=== Solo DVDs ===
No.	Title	Release date
1	Chissā (ちっさー)	December 24, 2010
2	IMP. GIRL	December 9. 2011
