= Ubu (album) =

Studio album by Illion
- Released: February 25, 2013
- Recorded: 2012
- Genre: Alternative rock; pop rock; folk rock
- Length: 49:24
- Language: English, Japanese
- Label: Warner
- Producer: Yojiro Noda

Illion chronology
| Ubu (2013) | P.Y.L (2016) |

Singles from Ubu
- 1. "Brain Drain" Released: January 16, 2013; 2. "Mahoroba" Released: February 6, 2013

Ubu (stylised as UBU) is the debut album of Japanese musician Yojiro Noda, vocalist for the rock band Radwimps, under the solo name Illion. It was released on February 25, 2013, in the United Kingdom and Ireland, with releases in Japan and continental Europe following in March 2013.

== Background ==
Noda first announced his solo project in November 2012, and was interviewed at English interview with music website NME. Noda wanted to perform music globally, however decided a solo project was better to do it with, as performing outside Japan was not a goal of the band.

== Promotion ==
Noda released a live performance music video for "Brain Drain" on December 23, shot at Abbey Road Studios. It was first shown across 11 advertising screens in Shibuya, Tokyo, at 8:23pm, and a slightly different version was released to YouTube at the same time. It was released for a limited time of 48 hours, and was taken down on December 25, 2012. The song was released to iTunes on January 16, 2013.

The second track released from the album was "Mahoroba," which received a music video directed by Tetsuya Nagato. It was uploaded to YouTube on February 6, 2013, and was also released to iTunes on the same day. Illion was taught by artist Daito Manabe how to contort and twitch his face, and was first asked to collaborate with Noda in 2009.

There were three planned live performances to promote the album. Noda first performed live as Illion at the O2 Shepherd's Bush Empire in London on March 17, 2013. He also performed at the Indra Musikclub in Hamburg, Germany, on March 19. Noda planned to perform at the Tokyo Rocks rock festival in Tokyo on May 12, however the festival was cancelled due to changes in the festival's administration.

On April 12, 2013, a music video for the song "Beehive" was released. It features a live-action/animated sequence directed and drawn by Sojiro Kamatani.

== Conception and writing ==
"Brain Drain" (2013)
"Brain Drain" was the first song released from the album.

"Mahoroba" (2013)
The second single, "Mahoroba" was praised for its "literary lyrics" and "nostalic melody" by Tomoo Yamaguchi of Skream.

The album features 10 English songs, and four songs sung in Japanese: "Aiwaguma," "Gasshow," "Hiruno Hoshi" and "Mahoroba." Noda sung most of the songs on the album in English, because he feels that English is better to work with sonically.

Mahoroba is a reference to a traditional Japanese far-off utopian land.

"Finger Print" features lyrics about Noda putting fingers down throat, which Noda describes as not based around an eating disorder, but something he does when he becomes scared of losing happiness.

== Critical reception ==
Skream magazine reviewer Sayako Oki gave the album a very positive review calling it "impressive" and "overflowing with musical genius." Tomoo Yamaguchi of Skream in a track-by-track review praised many of the songs' dynamic melodies, as well as the alternative folk sound. He felt that many songs on the album had either a folk sound, such as "Aiwaguma," "Mahoroba," "Un & Do," "Gasshow" and "Inemuri," but noted each song sounded different, such as the traditional feel of "Aiwaguma," the English folk sound of "Un & Do," and the country/Irish sound of "Especially." He felt "Brain Drain" and "Lynch" were classically influenced, and that "Finger Print" was influenced by 1990s American alternative rock. Yamaguchi praised the rhythmic nature of many of the tracks, as well as the strong guitar sound of many songs. He described the songs with Japanese lyrics as literary, with an old Japanese feel.

The album was chosen for an editor's choice review at OKMusic, where it was praised for its complex musical arrangements, the editor feeling they "expressed [Noda's] personality landscape three-dimensionally," and that the album physically moved them.

== Commercial reception ==
The album debuted at number 67 on Oricon's albums chart, due to 1,800 copies of the United Kingdom pre-release being sold in Japan. During the official week of release, it peaked at number 7 with 17,900 copies sold. The album spent one further week in the top 30. The album underperformed compared with Radwimps 2011 album, Zettai Zetsumei, which sold eight times Ubu's sales.

Two songs charted from the album on Billboard's Japan Hot 100 singles chart. "Brain Drain" reached number 30 during its pre-release in January 2013, and "Mahoroba" reached number 27 during album promotions in mid March, 2013.

As of April 2013, the album or its singles have not charted outside Japan.

== Track listing ==
All tracks are written by Yojiro Noda.

| No. | Title | Length |
|---|---|---|
| 1. | "Brain Drain" | 4:27 |
| 2. | "Aiwaguma" | 3:46 |
| 3. | "Planetarian" | 4:02 |
| 4. | "Mahoroba" | 4:44 |
| 5. | "Beehive" | 3:56 |
| 6. | "Dance" | 4:14 |
| 7. | "γ" (Gamma) | 3:24 |
| 8. | "Finger Print" | 2:53 |
| 9. | "Lynch" | 3:55 |
| 10. | "Un&Do" | 3:19 |
| 11. | "Gasshow" (Chorus) | 3:04 |
| 12. | "Inemuri" (Dozing Off) | 1:07 |
| 13. | "Especially" | 2:43 |
| 14. | "Birdie" | 4:03 |
| Total length: | | 49:45 |

Japan bonus track
| No. | Title | Length |
|---|---|---|
| 15. | "Hiruno Hoshi" (Daytime Star) | 3:52 |
| Total length: | | 53:37 |

== Personnel ==
Personnel details were sourced from Ubu's liner notes booklet.

Managerial

- Lachie Rutherford – executive director for Warner Music Japan
- Junji Zenki – executive director for Voque Ting

Performance credits

- Illion – all other instruments, all vocals
- Seiji Kameda – bass (track 2)
- Yukio Nagoshi – guitar (track 2)
- Udai Shika – cello (track 1, 5, 11)
- U-zhaan – tabla (track 2)

Visuals and imagery

- Tetsuya Nagato – art direction, artwork, design, music video directing ("Mahoroba")
- Masayuki Shioda – photography

Technical and production

- Ted Jensen – mastering
- Illion – songwriting, production
- Dave Sardy – mixing (track 1, 6, 13)
- Masayoshi Sugai – mixing (track 2–5, 7–12, 14), recording

== Chart rankings ==
| Charts (2013) | Peak position |
|---|---|
| Oricon weekly albums | 7 |
| Oricon monthly albums | 14 |

=== Reported sales ===
| Chart | Amount |
|---|---|
| Oricon physical sales | 36,000 |

== Release history ==
| Region | Date | Format | Distributing Label |
|---|---|---|---|
| United Kingdom | February 25, 2013 | CD, digital download | Warner Brothers Records UK |
| Ireland | February 25, 2013 | CD, digital download | Warner Music Ireland |
| Japan | March 6, 2013 | CD, digital download | Warner Music Japan |
| Japan | March 23, 2013 | Rental CD | Warner Music Japan |
| Austria | March 29, 2013 | CD, digital download | Warner Music Central Europe |
| France | March 29, 2013 | CD, digital download | Warner Music France |
| Germany | March 29, 2013 | CD, digital download | Warner Music Germany |
| Poland | March 29, 2013 | CD, digital download | Warner Music Central Europe |
| Switzerland | March 29, 2013 | CD, digital download | Warner Music Central Europe |
| United Kingdom | July 1, 2013 | Vinyl | Warner Brothers Records UK |
| Germany | July 5, 2013 | Vinyl | Warner Music Germany |
| Japan | July 9, 2013 | Vinyl | Warner Music Japan |
