= Ai no Album 8 =

Studio album by Berryz Kobo
- Released: 22 February 2012 (Japan)
- Recorded: 2011
- Genres: J-pop, pop
- Label: Piccolo Town
- Producer: Tsunku

Berryz Kobo chronology
7 Berryz Times (2011)	Ai no Album 8 (2012)	Berryz Mansion 9kai (2013)

Singles from Ai no Album 8
- 1. "Ai no Dangan" Released: 8 June 2011; 2. "Aa, Yo ga Akeru" Released: 10 August 2011; 3. "Amazuppai Haru ni Sakura Saku by Berryz Kobo×Cute" Released: 9 November 2011

Ai no Album 8 (愛のアルバム⑧, Ai no Arubamu Hachi) is the eighth album by the Japanese girl idol group Berryz Kobo, released on 22 February 2012 in Japan on the record label Piccolo Town.

As usual, it is entirely written and produced by Tsunku.

The album contains the title tracks from three previously released hit singles: "Ai no Dangan", "Aa, Yo ga Akeru", and "Amazuppai Haru ni Sakura Saku", the latter recorded in collaboration with Cute. In total there are 10 tracks on the album.

There is also a Berryz Kobo version of "Seishun Gekijō", a track that has already been published on the compilation album Petit Best 12, performed there by the unit Berryz Kobo×Cute.

Ai no Album 8 will be available in 2 editions: regular (PKCP-5203) and limited (PKCP-5201/2). The limited edition comes with a DVD that includes a live performance of the group's upcoming single "Be Genki <Naseba Naru!>" and the album jacket making-of.

The album debuted at number 10 in the Oricon Daily Albums Chart and ranked 25th for the week.

== Track listing ==
All tracks are written by Tsunku.

CD
No.	Title	Artist(s)	Length
1.	"Mythology ~Ai no Album~" (Mythology～愛のアルバム～)
2.	"Yo no Naka no Barairo" (世の中薔薇色)
3.	"Shy Boy" (Shy boy)
4.	"Because Happiness" (Because happiness)
5.	"Ren'ai Moyō" (恋愛模様)	Chinami Tokunaga, Maasa Sudo, Yurina Kumai, Risako Sugaya
6.	"Ai no Dangan" (愛の弾丸)
7.	"Amazuppai Haru ni Sakura Saku" (甘酸っぱい春にサクラサク)	Berryz Kobo×Cute
8.	"Atarashii Hibi" (新しい日々)	Saki Shimizu, Momoko Tsugunaga, Miyabi Natsuyaki
9.	"Aa, Yo ga Akeru" (ああ、夜が明ける)
10.	"Seishun Gekijō (Berryz Kōbō Ver.)" (青春劇場（Berryz工房Ver.）)

Limited Edition DVD
No.	Title	Length
1.	"Be Genki <Naseba Naru!> (Live Ver.)" (Be 元気＜成せば成るっ！＞(Live Ver.))
2.	"Be Genki <Naseba Naru!> (Shimizu Saki Solo Live Ver.)" (Be 元気＜成せば成るっ！＞(清水佐紀 Solo Live Ver.))
3.	"Be Genki <Naseba Naru!> (Tsugunaga Momoko Solo Live Ver.)" (Be 元気＜成せば成るっ！＞(嗣永桃子 Solo Live Ver.))
4.	"Be Genki <Naseba Naru!> (Tokunaga Chinami Solo Live Ver.)" (Be 元気＜成せば成るっ！＞(徳永千奈美 Solo Live Ver.))
5.	"Be Genki <Naseba Naru!> (Sudō Māsa Solo Live Ver.)" (Be 元気＜成せば成るっ！＞(須藤茉麻 Solo Live Ver.))
6.	"Be Genki <Naseba Naru!> (Natsuyaki Miyabi Solo Live Ver.)" (Be 元気＜成せば成るっ！＞(夏焼雅 Solo Live Ver.))
7.	"Be Genki <Naseba Naru!> (Kumai Yurina Solo Live Ver.)" (Be 元気＜成せば成るっ！＞(熊井友理奈 Solo Live Ver.))
8.	"Be Genki <Naseba Naru!> (Sugaya Risako Solo Live Ver.)" (Be 元気＜成せば成るっ！＞(菅谷梨沙子 Solo Live Ver.))
9.	"Album Jacket Satsuei Making" (アルバムジャケット撮影メイキング, "Album jacket photography making-of")

Notes

- Tracks 2–8 were recorded live during the Hello! Project 2012 WINTER Hello Pro Tengoku ~Rock-chan~ concert tour at the Nakano Sun Plaza

== Charts ==
Chart (2012)	Peak position	Sales	
Chart (2012)	Peak position	First week	Total
Oricon Daily Albums Chart	10		
Oricon Weekly Albums Chart	25	5,666	
Billboard Japan Top Albums	24		
