= Sekaiichi Happy na Onna no Ko =

- Regular Edition cover

Single by Cute

from the album Dai Nana Shō 'Utsukushikutte Gomen ne'
- B-side: "Idai na Chikara o!"
- Released: September 7, 2011 (Japan)
- Genre: J-pop
- Length: 13:38
- Label: Zetima
- Songwriter: Tsunku
- Producer: Tsunku

Cute singles chronology
"Momoiro Sparkling" (2011)	"Sekaiichi Happy na Onna no Ko" (2011)	"Kimi wa Jitensha Watashi wa Densha de Kitaku" (2012)

Berryz Kobo×Cute singles chronology
"Amazuppai Haru ni Sakura Saku" (2011)

Hello! Project Mobekimasu singles chronology
"Busu ni Naranai Tetsugaku" (2011)

Music video
- "Sekaiichi Happy na Onna no Ko" on YouTube

"Sekaiichi Happy na Onna no Ko" (世界一HAPPYな女の子; "The happiest girl in the world") is the 17th major single by the Japanese idol group Cute, released in Japan on September 7, 2011 on the Zetima label.

== Background ==
The single will be released in three versions: Regular Edition (catalog number EPCE-5816), and Limited Editions A (EPCE-5812/3) and B (EPCE-5814/5) that include a bonus DVD. Limited Edition A DVD will contain the "Sekaiichi Happy na Onna no Ko (Dance Shot Ver.)" music video, and Limited Edition B will have "Sekaiichi Happy na Onna no Ko (Color Box Ver.)".

The Single V will be released on September 14.

== CD single ==
=== Track listing ===
All tracks are written by Tsunku.

CD
No.	Title	Arrangement	Length
1.	"Sekaiichi Happy na Onna no Ko" (世界一ＨＡＰＰＹな女の子)	Masanori Takumi	4:23
2.	"Idai na Chikara o!" (偉大な力を！)	Yoshiaki Fujisawa	4:44
3.	"Sekaiichi Happy na Onna no Ko (Instrumental)" (世界一ＨＡＰＰＹな女の子(Instrumental))		4:23

Limited Edition A DVD
No.	Title	Length
1.	"Sekaiichi Happy na Onna no Ko (Dance Shot Ver.)" (世界一ＨＡＰＰＹな女の子(Dance Shot Ver.))

Limited Edition B DVD
No.	Title	Length
1.	"Sekaiichi Happy na Onna no Ko (Color Box Ver.)" (世界一ＨＡＰＰＹな女の子(Color Box Ver.))

=== Bonus ===
Sealed into all the limited editions

- Event ticket lottery card with a serial number

== Single V ==
DVD
No.	Title	Length
1.	"Sekaiichi Happy na Onna no Ko" (世界一ＨＡＰＰＹな女の子)
2.	"Sekaiichi Happy na Onna no Ko (Close-up Ver.)" (世界一ＨＡＰＰＹな女の子(Close-up Ver.))
3.	"Making of" (メイキング映像 Making eizō)

== Event V ==
DVD
No.	Title	Length
1.	"Sekaiichi Happy na Onna no Ko (Maimi Yajima Solo Ver.)" (世界一ＨＡＰＰＹな女の子(Maimi Yajima Solo Ver.))
2.	"Sekaiichi Happy na Onna no Ko (Saki Nakajima Solo Ver.)" (世界一ＨＡＰＰＹな女の子(Saki Nakajima Solo Ver.))
3.	"Sekaiichi Happy na Onna no Ko (Airi Suzuki Solo Ver.)" (世界一ＨＡＰＰＹな女の子(Airi Suzuki Solo Ver.))
4.	"Sekaiichi Happy na Onna no Ko (Chisato Okai Solo Ver.)" (世界一ＨＡＰＰＹな女の子(Chisato Okai Solo Ver.))
5.	"Sekaiichi Happy na Onna no Ko (Mai Hagiwara Solo Ver.)" (世界一ＨＡＰＰＹな女の子(Mai Hagiwara Solo Ver.))

== Charts ==
Chart (2011)	Peak position
Oricon Daily Singles Chart	5
Oricon Weekly Singles Chart	6
Oricon Monthly Singles Chart	24
Billboard Japan Hot 100	27
Billboard Japan Hot Singles Sales	7
Billboard Japan Adult Contemporary Airplay	74

=== Sales and certifications ===
	First week	Total
Oricon sales	16,638	19,830
