= Chō Wonderful! 6 =

- Regular Edition cover

Studio album by Cute
- Released: April 6, 2011 (Japan)
- Genre: J-pop, pop
- Label: Zetima
- Producer: Tsunku

Cute chronology
Shocking 5 (2010)	Chō Wonderful! 6 (2011)	Dai Nana Shō "Utsukushikutte Gomen ne" (2012)

Singles from Chō Wonderful! 6
- 1. "Campus Life: Umarete Kite Yokatta" Released: April 26, 2010; 2. "Dance de Bakōn!" Released: August 25, 2010; 3. "Aitai Lonely Christmas" Released: December 1, 2010; 4. "Kiss me Aishiteru" Released: February 23, 2011

Alternative cover
- Limited Edition cover

Chō Wonderful! 6 (超ＷＯＮＤＥＲＦＵＬ！６, Chō Wandafuru Roku, "Superwonderful 6") is Cute's sixth studio album, released on April 6, 2011, in Japan on the record label Zetima.

The album release was delayed due to the 2011 Tohoku earthquake and tsunami.

The album debuted at number 20 in the Oricon Weekly Albums Chart, remaining in the chart for three weeks.

== Track listing ==
All tracks are written by Tsunku

CD
No.	Title	Length
1.	"Chō Wonderful!" (超WONDERFUL!)
2.	"Midnight Temptation"
3.	"Kiss me Aishiteru" (Kiss me 愛してる)
4.	"Iza, Susume! Steady go!" (いざ、進め! Steady go!)
5.	"Rururururu" (ルルルルル)
6.	"Wakaretakunai" (別れたくない・・・)
7.	"Aitai Lonely Christmas" (会いたいロンリークリスマス)
8.	"Circle" (サークル)
9.	"Dance de Bakōn" (Danceでバコーン!)
10.	"3ban Home 3 Ryōme" (3番ホーム 3両目)
11.	"Campus Life: Umarete Kite Yokatta" (キャンパスライフ～生まれて来てよかった～)

Limited Edition DVD
No.	Title	Length
1.	"Aitai Lonely Christmas (White Christmas Ver.)" (会いたいロンリークリスマス (White Christmas Ver.))
2.	"Kiss Me Aishiteru (Dance Shot Ver.)" (Kiss me 愛してる (Dance Shot Ver.))
3.	"Jacket Satsuei Making" (ジャケット撮影メイキング, "Jacket Photography Making of")
4.	"Kiss Me Aishiteru (Dance Lesson Making)" (Kiss me 愛してる（ダンスレッスンメイキング）)

== Charts ==
Chart (2011)	Peak position	Sales	
Chart (2011)	Peak position	First week	Total
Japan (Oricon Weekly Albums Chart)	20	6,450	7,716
