= Ā, Yo ga Akeru =

Single by Berryz Kobo

from the album Ai no Album 8
- B-side: "Otona ni wa Naritakunai Hayaku Otona ni Naritai"
- Released: August 10, 2011 (Japan)
- Genre: J-pop
- Label: Piccolo Town
- Songwriter: Tsunku
- Producer: Tsunku

Berryz Kobo singles chronology
"Ai no Dangan" (2011)	"Ā, Yo ga Akeru" (2011)	"Be Genki (Naseba Naru!)" (2012)

Berryz Kobo×Cute singles chronology
"Amazuppai Haru ni Sakura Saku" (2011)

Hello! Project Mobekimasu singles chronology
"Busu ni Naranai Tetsugaku" (2011)

Music video
- "Ā, Yo ga Akeru" on YouTube

"Ā, Yo ga Akeru" (ああ、夜が明ける) is the 27th single by the Japanese girl idol group Berryz Kobo. It was released in Japan on August 10, 2011, and debuted at number 7 on the Oricon weekly CD singles chart.

== Track listings ==
=== CD single ===
1. "Ā, Yo ga Akeru" (ああ、夜が明ける)
2. "Otona ni wa Naritakunai Hayaku Otona ni Naritai" (大人にはなりたくない 早く大人になりたい)
3. "Ā, Yo ga Akeru" (Instrumental)

Limited Edition A DVD

1. "Ā, Yo ga Akeru" (Dance Shot Ver.)

Limited Edition B DVD

1. "Ā, Yo ga Akeru" (Close-up Ver.)

=== DVD single Event V "Ā, Yo ga Akeru" ===
1. "Ā, Yo ga Akeru" (Shimizu Saki Close-up Ver.)
2. "Ā, Yo ga Akeru" (Tsugunaga Momoko Close-up Ver.)
3. "Ā, Yo ga Akeru" (Tokunaga Chinami Close-up Ver.)
4. "Ā, Yo ga Akeru" (Sudo Maasa Close-up Ver.)
5. "Ā, Yo ga Akeru" (Natsuyaki Miyabi Close-up Ver.)
6. "Ā, Yo ga Akeru" (Kumai Yurina Close-up Ver.)
7. "Ā, Yo ga Akeru" (Sugaya Risako Close-up Ver.)

== Charts ==
Chart (2011)	Peak position
Japan (Oricon)	7
