= Dada (song) =

Single by Radwimps

from the album Zettai Zetsumei
- Released: January 12, 2011
- Recorded: 2010
- Genre: Emo punk, Post-punk, rap-rock
- Length: 3:45
- Label: EMI Music Japan
- Songwriter: Yojiro Noda

Radwimps singles chronology
"Manifesto" (2010)	"Dada" (2011)	"Kyōshinshō" (2011)

"Dada" is a Japanese-language song by Japanese rock band Radwimps, released on January 12, 2011, as the first of two singles leading up to the band's sixth album, Zettai Zetsumei.

The single debuted at number one on Oricon's single charts, and in terms of physical sales, "Dada" is the band's most commercially successful single as of 2011.

== Composition and writing ==
The song is a rock song that begins with vocalist Yojiro Noda's voice and drums, as well as background sound effects, which cut away to a violent bass, drum and electric guitar instrumental motif, with verses having a similar arrangement to the introduction, and the chorus arranged heavier, much more in common with the instrumental motif. The version of the song that appears on Zettai Zetsumei, "Dada (Dadadada Ver.)" has the same structure as the original, and the motif remains untouched. However, different instruments are louder and quieter in verses, such as the telephone sounds. The beginning of the song also features an extended drum solo introduction.

The lyrics of the song describe many nihilistic ideas about youth. While verses are dense with many concepts talked about quickly, the song's chorus is mostly single sounds repeated. Lyricist Yojiro Noda birth as an entrance and death as an exit, and that all life between these two points is a detour, and that all time between these two points is just "killing time." Noda questions why people forget about death, and only think of themselves in the present. He asks people to try to search for short-cuts. He calls disbelief in wishes, hate and prejudice as "the extremes of fiends," and then mentions nenbutsu, the Buddhist repeating of a phrase to negate karma. The song also talks about technology and ecology, and about how despite the need for the planet to be protected, people believe in the sentiment but forget about it, to do other things.

The title of the song was chosen for three meanings: its connection to Dadaism, the Japanese word dadakko (駄々っ子, "selfish/restless/spoilt child"), as well as because the musical keys D and A were used in the song. Noda described the song as coming from the thought that if everyone eventually dies, everything between then and birth is pointless. He describes wanting to find a "short-cut" as having something note than death. Recording of both "Dada" and the B-side "Ruru" was finalised in late November, 2010.

== Promotion ==
The band appeared on the Tokyo FM radio program School of Lock! on January 13, 2011, as a show separate from their regular Radlocks! show.

Short reviews of the single appeared in many music magazines around to the single's release, such as Backstage Pass, Gigs, Musica, Ongaku to Hito and Rockin' On' Japan. The band was featured on the cover of the February issue of Musica, in which two separate interviews appeared (one just with Yojiro Noda, and one with all band members). The band were also interviewed in Rockin' On' Japan's March issue to promote the single, as well as "Kyōshinshō."

== Music video ==
Above: The four band members holding the D A D A graphemes, surrounded by a computer graphic border of graphemes. Below: Yojiro Noda messes up the arranged lyrics by sliding into them.

The music video was directed by Yasuhiko Shimizu, who had previously not worked with the band on a music video before. The video was shown in early December 2010.

In the music video, the band performs the song against a white background, while surrounded by 3D versions of graphemes from the song's lyrics and title. The graphemes are either physical items the band interacts with by holding them or being surrounded by them, or computer graphics that rush past the band. As well as individual large characters, an entire reproduction of the song's lyrics as items is featured in the video, and is then destroyed by Yojiro Noda as he kicks and slides through them. Near the end of the video the images become greyscale negatives, and features the entire band piling the physical lyrics.

Since the video was uploaded by Radwimps' official YouTube channel on January 9, 2011, the video has been viewed approximately 16,500,000 times (as of October 2018).

== Critical reception ==
"Dada" was received positively by Japanese music critics. CDJournal's listening comment review gave the single a star for an exceptional work, noting the "aggressive rhythms and guitar riffs," as well as a 1990s style Japanese rap-rock sound. Haruna Takekawa of Hot Express felt the song was "a little dangerous, but very stimulating," feeling the song was a reassuring light that "frees your brain." Miki of What's In? noted a complicated power of language in the song's "post-punk heavy sound base," and felt it had "the power of the origin of rock." Hiroko Kimura, in her review in CDJournal magazine's January 2011 issue, felt that the song was a high point for the band, praising the casual mix of funny and serious. She compared the song to "laughing while raising your middle finger," and feels that the lyrical aspects of non-standard rhyme and playing around with complicated terminology stops the song from "overheating."

Many critics felt the ambiguity of the title added to the work, believing that the title was expressing both aspects of Dadaism and being a selfish child. Kimura felt the lyrics evoked modern-day dadaism, and that they present questions about modern culture, with a "whirl of nihilistic feelings and vague anxieties."

The song was often compared to the band's 2009 song "Oshakashama," with Aoyuki feeling that "Dada" was a further development. Takegawa noting the similarity of "hectic colour changes" and "violently flying sounds" in both songs, and believes that both songs are a part of the band's "new outlook." Kimura noted the lyrical shift from Radwimps previous songs, that are generally based around the feelings of relationships. She felt that the song shifted to "wide affection" and opinions of society. Kimura felt that the song's arrangement, however, evoked an earlier Radwimps sound, such as "EDP (Tonde Hi ni Iru Natsu no Kimi)" (2006).

== Commercial performance ==
By the mid-way point in the 2011 Oricon year, the single was the 28th most sold. The song was certified gold by the Recording Industry Association of Japan for shipped physical copies, the second Radwimps single and only one of three to receive this certification. The song is one of ten Radwimps songs to receive a certification from the RIAJ.

The B-side of the single, "Ruru," was popular enough digitally to chart at number 27 on the RIAJ Digital Track Chart during the single's release week.

== Track listing ==
All tracks are written by Yojiro Noda.

No.	Title	Length
1.	"Dada"	3:45
2.	"Ruru" (縷々 "At Length")	4:03
Total length:		7:48

== Charts ==
"Dada" (single version)
The version of "Dada" that appears on the single.

Chart (2011)	Peak position
Billboard Adult Contemporary Airplay	8
Billboard Japan Hot 100	1
Oricon daily singles	1
Oricon weekly singles	1
Oricon monthly singles	3
RIAJ Digital Track Chart Top 100	8

=== Sales and certifications ===
Chart	Amount
Oricon physical sales	121,000
RIAJ physical shipping certification	Gold (100,000+)

== Release history ==
Region	Date	Format	Distributing Label
Japan	December 22, 2010	Ringtone	EMI Music Japan
Japan	January 12, 2011	CD, digital download, Rental CD	EMI Music Japan
Japan	March 9, 2011	Digital download (Dadadada Ver.)	EMI Music Japan
