= Kiss Me Aishiteru =

2011 single by Cute (Japanese group)

- Regular Edition cover

Single by Cute

from the album Chō Wonderful! 6
- B-side: "Hatachimae no Onna no Ko"
- Released: February 23, 2011 (Japan)
- Genre: J-pop; electropop
- Label: Zetima
- Songwriter: Tsunku
- Producer: Tsunku

Cute singles chronology
"Aitai Lonely Christmas" (2010)	"Kiss Me Aishiteru" (2011)	"Momoiro Sparkling" (2011)

Music video
- "Kiss me Aishiteru" on YouTube

"Kiss Me Aishiteru" (Kiss Me 愛してる; "Kiss me, I love you") is the 15th major single by the Japanese idol group Cute and their first single of 2011, released on February 23, 2011.

== Track listing ==
=== CD single ===
All tracks are written by Tsunku.

CD
No.	Title	Length
1.	"Kiss Me Aishiteru" (Kiss Me 愛してる)
2.	"Hatachimae no On'nanoko" (二十歳前の女の子)
3.	"Kiss Me Aishiteru (Instrumental)" (Kiss Me 愛してる (Instrumental))

Limited Edition A DVD
No.	Title	Length
1.	"Kiss Me Aishiteru (Ball Chair Ver.)" (Kiss Me 愛してる (Ball Chair Ver.))

Limited Edition B DVD
No.	Title	Length
1.	"Kiss Me Aishiteru (Metal Balloon Ver.)" (Kiss Me 愛してる (Metal Balloon Ver.))

=== Single V ===
DVD
No.	Title	Length
1.	"Kiss Me Aishiteru" (Kiss Me 愛してる)
2.	"Kiss Me Aishiteru (Close-up Ver.)" (Kiss Me 愛してる (Close-up Ver.))
3.	"Making of" (メイキング映像)

== Event V ==
Catalog Nr.: TGBS-5753

DVD
No.	Title	Length
1.	"Kiss Me Aishiteru (Maimi Yajima Solo Ver.)" (Kiss Me 愛してる(Maimi Yajima Solo Ver.))
2.	"Kiss Me Aishiteru (Saki Nakajima Solo Ver.)" (Kiss Me 愛してる(Saki Nakajima Solo Ver.))
3.	"Kiss Me Aishiteru (Airi Suzuki Solo Ver.)" (Kiss Me 愛してる(Airi Suzuki Solo Ver.))
4.	"Kiss Me Aishiteru (Chisato Okai Solo Ver.)" (Kiss Me 愛してる(Chisato Okai Solo Ver.))
5.	"Kiss Me Aishiteru (Mai Hagiwara Solo Ver.)" (Kiss Me 愛してる(Mai Hagiwara Solo Ver.))

== Charts ==
Chart (2011)	Peak position
Oricon Daily Singles Chart	4
Oricon Weekly Singles Chart	4
Oricon Monthly Singles Chart	23
Billboard Japan Hot 100	16
Billboard Japan Hot Top Airplay	41
Billboard Japan Hot Singles Sales	4
