= Heroine ni Narō ka! =

Single by Berryz Kobo

from the album 7 Berryz Times
- B-side: "Hero Arawaru!"
- Released: March 2, 2011 (Japan)
- Genre: J-pop; EDM; electronic
- Label: Piccolo Town
- Songwriter: Tsunku
- Producer: Tsunku

Berryz Kobo singles chronology
"Shining Power" (2010)	"Heroine ni Narō ka!" (2011)	"Ai no Dangan" (2011)

Music video
- "Heroine ni Narō ka!" - YouTube

"Heroine ni Narō ka!" (ヒロインになろうか!) is the 25th single by the Japanese girl idol group Berryz Kobo. It was released in Japan on March 2, 2011, and debuted at number 7 in the weekly Oricon singles chart.

== Track listings ==
=== CD single ===
1. "Heroine ni Narō ka!" (ヒロインになろうか!)
2. "Hero Arawaru!" (ヒーロー現る!)
3. "Heroine ni Narō ka!" (Instrumental)

Limited Edition A DVD

1. "Heroine ni Narō ka!" (Dance Shot Ver.)

Limited Edition B DVD

1. "Heroine ni Narō ka!" (Dance Solo Mix Ver.)

=== DVD single "Heroine ni Narō ka!" Single V ===
1. "Heroine ni Narō ka!"
2. "Heroine ni Narō ka!" (Close-up Ver.)
3. Making-of (メイキング映像, Making Eizō)

== Charts ==
Chart (2010)	Peak position
Japan (Oricon Weekly Singles Chart)	7
