= Want! (Berryz Kobo song) =

- Regular Edition cover

Single by Berryz Kobo

from the album Berryz Mansion 9kai
- B-side: "Yūki o Kudasai!"
- Released: December 19, 2012 (Japan)
- Genre: J-pop; electropop
- Label: Piccolo Town
- Songwriter: Tsunku
- Producer: Tsunku

Berryz Kobo singles chronology
"Cha Cha Sing" (2012)	"Want!" (2012)	"Asian Celebration" (2013)

Music video
- "Want!" on YouTube

Professional ratings
Review scores
Source	Rating
Billboard Japan	Favorable

"Want!" (stylized as "WANT!") is the 30th single by the Japanese idol group Berryz Kobo, released in Japan on December 19, 2012.

== Background ==
The single was released in four versions: Limited Edition A (catalog number PKCP-5216/7), Limited Edition B (PKCP-5218/9), Limited Edition C (PKCP-5220), and Regular Edition (PKCP-5221). Each edition has a different cover. All the limited editions were shipped sealed and included a serial-numbered entry card for the lottery to win a ticket to one of the single's launch events. The limited editions A and B included a bonus DVD: Limited Edition A DVD contained the "Want! (Dance Shot Ver.)" music video, Limited Edition B — "Want! (Dance Shot Ver. II)".

The corresponding DVD single (so called Single V) was released a week later, on December 26. As of November 27, the music video for the title song had been uploaded to the Berryz Kobo official YouTube channel.

The song, with lyrics by Tsunku (つんく), begins with the words "Yasashiku kata toka dakarete mitai" (優しく肩とか抱かれてみたい; "I want you to gently hold my shoulders"), but the title comes from the refrain which is sung in English: "Ah, ah, ah, ah, I want it, want it".

== Track listing ==
All tracks are written by Tsunku.

CD
No.	Title	Length
1.	"Want!" (WANT!)
2.	"Yūki o Kudasai!" (勇気をください! "Please Give Me Courage!")
3.	"Want! (Instrumental)" (WANT!（Instrumental）)

Limited Edition A DVD
No.	Title	Length
1.	"Want! (Dance Shot Ver.)" (WANT!（Dance Shot Ver.）)

Limited Edition B DVD
No.	Title	Length
1.	"Want! (Dance Shot Ver. II)" (WANT!（Dance Shot Ver.II）)

=== Bonus ===
Sealed into all the limited editions

- Event ticket lottery card with a serial number

== Charts ==
Chart (2012)	Peak position
Oricon Daily Singles Chart	3
Oricon Weekly Singles Chart	3
Oricon Monthly Singles Chart	18
