= Maji Bomber!! =

Single by Berryz Kobo

from the album 7 Berryz Times
- Released: 14 July 2010 (CD); 21 July 2010 (Single V)
- Recorded: 2010
- Genre: J-pop, pop
- Label: Piccolo Town
- Songwriter: Tsunku
- Producer: Tsunku

Berryz Kobo singles chronology
"Otakebi Boy Wao! / Tomodachi wa Tomodachi Nanda!" (2010)	"Maji Bomber!!" (2010)	"Shining Power" (2010)

Music video
- "Maji Bomber!!" on YouTube

"Maji Bomber!!" (本気ボンバー！！) is the 23rd single by the Japanese idol group Berryz Kobo, released in Japan on 14 July 2010.

The physical CD single debuted at 6th place in the Japanese Oricon weekly singles chart.

== Charts ==
=== CD single ===
Chart (2010)	Peak position
Japan (Oricon Daily Singles Chart)	5
Japan (Oricon Weekly Singles Chart)	6

=== DVD single "Single V «Maji Bomber!!»" ===
Chart (2010)	Peak position
Japan (Oricon Weekly DVD Chart)	63
