= Million Yen Women =

Japanese manga series

- First tankōbon volume cover

100万円の女たち (Hyaku-manen no Onna-tachi)
- Genre: Romantic comedy
- Manga
- Written by: Shunju Aono
- Published by: Shogakukan
- Magazine: Weekly Big Comic Spirits
- Original run: November 16, 2015 – September 5, 2016
- Volumes: 4
- Television drama
- Directed by: Michihito Fujii
- Written by: Yoshitatsu Yamada; Yoshimiko Murooka; Yuuya Nakazono
- Studio: TV Tokyo; imageField
- Original network: TV Tokyo
- Original run: April 14, 2017 – June 30, 2017
- Episodes: 12
- icon

Million Yen Women (Japanese: 100万円の女たち, Hepburn: Hyaku-man'en no Onna-tachi) is a Japanese manga series written and illustrated by Shunju Aono. It was serialized in Shogakukan's seinen manga magazine Weekly Big Comic Spirits from November 2015 to September 2016. The series was adapted into a television drama series in 2017, co-produced by Netflix and TV Tokyo co-production, starring Yojiro Noda, lead vocalist of Radwimps.

== Plot ==
Shin Michima is an unpopular novelist. He has lived with five mysterious women in the same house for half a year. Minami Shirakawa loves coffee. Hitomi Tsukamoto loves black tea, yoga and reading good books. Yuki Kobayashi is a polite woman and loves roasted green tea. Midori Suzumura is a high school student and loves acerola juice. Nanaka Seki loves drinking milk.

These five women pay Shin a million yen every month for rent and living expenses, about 30x higher than normal. They have rules in the house and questions about the women are banned.

== Characters ==
Shin Michima
Portrayed by: Yojiro Noda
A 31-year old novelist struggling to produce a bestseller, often criticized by his literary rivals and the women in the household about his lack of good quality writing. His father is condemned on death row following the murder of three victims including Shin's mother, her lover, and a policeman who had arrived at the scene after they were killed. Shin receives daily accusatory messages on the fax machine from an anonymous sender.
Minami Shirakawa
Portrayed by: Rila Fukushima
A nudist at home who has a mysterious demeanor and occasionally violent tendencies. President of the ultra-luxury Call Girl Club. Minami refers to Shin as "Novel".
Hitomi Tsukamoto
Portrayed by: Rena Matsui
Hitomi is the daughter of influential novelist, Hibiki Ogie, who had died 11 years ago. She appears to be infatuated with Shin, often becoming frustrated when he does not pick up on her subtle hints.
Yuki Kobayashi
Portrayed by: Miwako Wagatsuma
She basically stays in her room. Married to a wealthy elderly man for whom she was previously a maid.
Midori Suzumura
Portrayed by: Rena Takeda
A 17-year-old high school girl. Midori was raised in an orphanage since her relinquishment by her parents at the age of three. As she got older, Midori took on part-time work to save for her independence from the orphanage and its unconventional rules. She had bought a lottery ticket and won one billion Yen prior to moving into the house and she appears to have feelings for Shin.
Nanaka Hiraki
Portrayed by: Yuko Araki
She is very clumsy and loves drinking milk. As a famous actress, Nanaka began her career as a child.

== Media ==
=== Manga ===
Written and illustrated by Shunju Aono, Million Yen Women was serialized in Shogakukan's seinen manga magazine Weekly Big Comic Spirits from November 16, 2015, to September 5, 2016. Shogakukan collected its chapters in four tankōbon volumes, released from March 30 to November 30, 2016. An extra chapter, published as "episode 0", was released on April 10, 2017.

==== Volumes ====
No.	Release date	ISBN
1	March 30, 2016	978-4-09-187507-5
2	June 30, 2016	978-4-09-187645-4
3	September 30, 2016	978-4-09-187785-7
4	November 30, 2016	978-4-09-189229-4

=== Drama ===
A 12-episode television drama adaptation, starring Radwimps's lead vocalist Yojiro Noda in his first television show, started streaming on Netflix on April 7, 2017, and was broadcast on TV Tokyo from April 14 to June 30 of that same year. (Note: TV Tokyo listed the air dates for the series on Thursday at 25:00, effectively Friday at 1:00 a.m. JST.) The theme song is "Tadayō Kanjō" (漂う感情; "Drifting Emotions") by Kotringo.

== See also ==
- I'll Give It My All... Tomorrow, another manga series by the same author
