= Amazuppai Haru ni Sakura Saku =

- Berryz Kobo Version Regular Edition cover

Single by Berryz Kobo × Cute

from the album Ai no Album 8 (Berryz Kobo) Dai Nana Shō 'Utsukushikutte Gomen ne' (Cute)
- B-side: "Tanjun Sugi na no Watashi" (Berryz Kobo Version); "Kirai de Kirai de Kirai" (Cute Version)
- Released: November 9, 2011 (Japan)
- Genre: J-pop, pop
- Length: 14:35 (Berryz Kobo Version); 14:53 (Cute Version)
- Label: Piccolo Town (Berryz Kobo Version); Zetima (Cute Version)
- Songwriter: Tsunku
- Producer: Tsunku

Berryz Kobo × Cute singles chronology
"Amazuppai Haru ni Sakura Saku" (2011)	"Chō Happy Song" (2012)

Berryz Kobo singles chronology
""Ā, Yo ga Akeru"" (2011)	""Be Genki (Naseba Naru!)"" (2012)

Cute singles chronology
""Sekaiichi Happy na Onna no Ko"" (2011)	""Kimi wa Jitensha Watashi wa Densha de Kitaku"" (2012)

Music video
- "Amazuppai Haru ni Sakura Saku" on YouTube

Alternative cover
- °C-ute Version Regular Edition cover

Professional ratings
Review scores
Source	Rating
Hotexpress	Favorable

"Amazuppai Haru ni Sakura Saku" (甘酸っぱい春にサクラサク; "In the Bittersweet Spring, the Sakura Blooms") is the first single by Berryz Kobo × Cute (pronounced Berikyū), a collaboration unit between the Japanese idol groups Berryz Kobo and Cute. The single was released on November 9, 2011.

It is a middle school graduation song.

== Background ==
Different versions of the single were released simultaneously on two record labels: Berryz Kobo's version was published by Piccolo Town, which is the Berryz Kobo's label, while Cute's version was published by the C-ute's label, Zetima. There were 3 editions of each version: Regular Edition (CD only), Limited Edition A (CD+DVD), Limited Edition B (CD only).

There was also a so-called Event V, a DVD containing several versions of the music video for the song "Amazuppai Haru ni Sakura Saku", released.

The title song was appointed as the ending theme for Ōsama Game, a BS-TBS horror movie in which members of both Berryz Kobo and Cute played.

It is a graduation song, but, as Maimi Yajima pointed out, it's not a sad farewell song, but rather a positive journey song.

First "Amazuppai Haru ni Sakura Saku" will be included in the Hello! Project compilation album Petit Best 12 and later in the Cute's upcoming 2012 album Dai Nana Shō 'Utsukushikutte Gomen ne'. It will also be present on the Berryz Kobo's upcoming album Ai no Album 8.

== Critical reception ==
Hotexpress's Tetsuo Hiraga wrote in his review: "The song has a consistent utterly happy and cute typical idol groove". But the reviewer also added that the song seemed very "chaotic" to him.

== CD single ==
=== Track listing ===
All songs written and composed by Tsunku.

Arrangement:

- "Amazuppai Haru ni Sakura Saku": Takumi Masanori
- "Kirai de Kirai de Kirai": Kōichi Yuasa
- "Tanjun Sugi na no Watashi..." : Yuichi Takahashi

==== Berryz Kobo Version ====
CD
No.	Title	Artists(s)	Length
1.	"Amazuppai Haru ni Sakura Saku" (甘酸っぱい春にサクラサク)
2.	"Tanjun Sugi na no Watashi..." (単純すぎなの私・・・)	Berryz Kobo
3.	"Amazuppai Haru ni Sakura Saku (Instrumental)" (甘酸っぱい春にサクラサク（Instrumental）)

Limited Edition A DVD
No.	Title	Length
1.	"Amazuppai Haru ni Sakura Saku (Berryz Kōbō Ver.)" (甘酸っぱい春にサクラサク（Berryz工房 Ver.）)

==== C-ute Version ====
CD
No.	Title	Artists(s)	Length
1.	"Amazuppai Haru ni Sakura Saku" (甘酸っぱい春にサクラサク)
2.	"Kirai de Kirai de Kirai" (嫌いで嫌いで嫌い)	Cute
3.	"Amazuppai Haru ni Sakura Saku (Instrumental)" (甘酸っぱい春にサクラサク（Instrumental）)

Limited Edition A DVD
No.	Title	Length
1.	"Amazuppai Haru ni Sakura Saku (C-ute Ver.)" (甘酸っぱい春にサクラサク （°C-ute Ver.）)

== Charts ==
Chart (2011)	Peak position	Weeks on chart	Sales	
Chart (2011)	Peak position	Weeks on chart	First week	Total
Oricon Daily Singles Chart	7			
Oricon Weekly Singles Chart	8	3	20,535	24,745
Oricon Monthly Singles Chart	32			
Billboard Japan Hot 100	15	1		
Billboard Japan Hot Singles Sales	9	2		
Billboard Japan Hot Top Airplay	53	1		
Billboard Japan Adult Contemporary Airplay	85	1		
