= Aitai Lonely Christmas =

- Regular Edition cover

Single by Cute

from the album Chō Wonderful! 6
- B-side: "Seishun! Mugen Power"
- Released: December 1, 2010 (Japan)
- Genre: J-pop
- Label: Zetima
- Songwriter: Tsunku
- Producer: Tsunku

Cute singles chronology
"Dance de Bakōn!" (2010)	"Aitai Lonely Christmas" (2010)	"Kiss Me Aishiteru" (2011)

Music video
- "Aitai Lonely Christmas" on YouTube

"Aitai Lonely Christmas" (会いたいロンリークリスマス, Aitai Ronrī Kurisumasu) is the 14th major single by the Japanese idol group Cute, released on December 1, 2010 on the Zetima label.

== Track listing ==
=== CD single ===
All tracks are written by Tsunku.

CD
No.	Title	Length
1.	"Aitai Lonely Christmas" (会いたいロンリークリスマス)
2.	"Seishun! Mugen Power" (青春！無限パワー)
3.	"Aitai Lonely Christmas (Instrumental)" (会いたいロンリークリスマス (Instrumental))

Limited Edition A DVD
No.	Title	Length
1.	"Aitai Lonely Christmas (Christmas House Ver.)" (会いたいロンリークリスマス (Christmas House Ver.))

Limited Edition B DVD
No.	Title	Length
1.	"Aitai Lonely Christmas (Christmas Night Ver.)" (会いたいロンリークリスマス (Christmas Night Ver.))

=== Event V ===
DVD
No.	Title	Length
1.	"Aitai Lonely Christmas (Yajima Maimi Solo Ver.)" (会いたいロンリークリスマス (矢島舞美 Solo Ver.))
2.	"Aitai Lonely Christmas (Nakajima Saki Solo Ver.)" (会いたいロンリークリスマス (中島早貴 Solo Ver.))
3.	"Aitai Lonely Christmas (Suzuki Airi Solo Ver.)" (会いたいロンリークリスマス (鈴木愛理 Solo Ver.))
4.	"Aitai Lonely Christmas (Okai Chisato Solo Ver.)" (会いたいロンリークリスマス (岡井千聖 Solo Ver.))
5.	"Aitai Lonely Christmas (Hagiwara Mai Solo Ver.)" (会いたいロンリークリスマス (萩原舞 Solo Ver.))

== Charts ==
Chart (2010)	Peak position
Oricon Daily Singles Chart	4
Oricon Weekly Singles Chart	6
Oricon Monthly Singles Chart	19
Billboard Japan Hot 100	20
Billboard Japan Hot Singles Sales	7
Billboard Japan Adult Contemporary Airplay	71
