= Be Genki (Naseba Naru!) =

Single by Berryz Kobo

from the album Berryz Mansion 9kai
- B-side: "Mō, Kodomo ja Nai Watashi na no ni..."
- Released: March 21, 2012 (Japan)
- Genre: J-pop
- Label: Piccolo Town
- Songwriter: Tsunku
- Producer: Tsunku

Berryz Kobo singles chronology
"Ā, Yo ga Akeru" (2011)	"Be Genki (Naseba Naru!)" (2012)	"Cha Cha Sing" (2012)

Berryz Kobo×Cute singles chronology
"Amazuppai Haru ni Sakura Saku" (2011)	"Chō Happy Song" (2012)

Hello! Project Mobekimasu singles chronology
"Busu ni Naranai Tetsugaku" (2011)

Music video
- "Be Genki (Naseba Naru!)" on YouTube

"Be Genki (Naseba Naru!)" (Be 元気＜成せば成るっ!＞) is the 28th single by the Japanese girl idol group Berryz Kobo. It was released in Japan on March 21, 2012, and debuted at number 9 on the Oricon weekly CD singles chart.

== Track listings ==
=== CD single ===
1. "Be Genki (Naseba Naru!)" (Be 元気＜成せば成るっ!＞)
2. "Mō, Kodomo ja Nai Watashi na no ni..." (もう、子供じゃない私なのに...)
3. "Be Genki (Naseba Naru!)" (Instrumental)

Limited Edition A DVD

1. "Be Genki (Naseba Naru!)" (Dance Shot Ver.)

Limited Edition B DVD

1. "Be Genki (Naseba Naru!)" (Close-up Ver.)

=== DVD single Single V "Be Genki (Naseba Naru!)" ===
1. "Be Genki (Naseba Naru!)"
2. "Be Genki (Naseba Naru!)" (Other Ver.)
3. Making-of (メイキング映像, Making Eizō)

=== DVD single Event V "Be Genki (Naseba Naru!)" ===
1. "Be Genki (Naseba Naru!)" (Shimizu Saki Close-up Ver.)
2. "Be Genki (Naseba Naru!)" (Tsugunaga Momoko Close-up Ver.)
3. "Be Genki (Naseba Naru!)" (Tokunaga Chinami Close-up Ver.)
4. "Be Genki (Naseba Naru!)" (Sudo Maasa Close-up Ver.)
5. "Be Genki (Naseba Naru!)" (Natsuyaki Miyabi Close-up Ver.)
6. "Be Genki (Naseba Naru!)" (Kumai Yurina Close-up Ver.)
7. "Be Genki (Naseba Naru!)" (Sugaya Risako Close-up Ver.)

== Charts ==
=== CD single ===
Chart (2012)	Peak position
Japan (Oricon)	9

=== DVD single Single V "Be Genki (Naseba Naru!)" ===
Chart (2012)	Peak position
Japan (Oricon)	9
