= Momoiro Sparkling =

2011 album by Cute (Japanese group)

- Regular Edition cover

Single by Cute

from the album Dai Nana Shō 'Utsukushikutte Gomen ne'
- B-side: "Faraway"
- Released: May 25, 2011 (Japan)
- Genre: J-pop
- Length: 13:13
- Label: Zetima
- Songwriter: Tsunku
- Producer: Tsunku

Cute singles chronology
"Kiss Me Aishiteru" (2011)	"Momoiro Sparkling" (2011)	"Sekaiichi Happy na Onna no Ko" (2011)

Music video
- "Momoiro Sparkling" on YouTube

Alternative cover
- Limited Edition A cover

Alternative cover
- Limited Edition B cover

"Momoiro Sparkling" (桃色スパークリング, Momoiro Supākuringu; "Pink Sparkling") is the 16th major single by the Japanese idol group Cute, released on May 25, 2011 on the Zetima label.

== Background ==
The single was intended as a summer tune. It was released in three versions: Regular Edition (catalog number EPCE-5790), and Limited Editions A (EPCE-5786) and B (EPCE-5788) that included a bonus DVD. Limited Edition A DVD contained the "Momoiro Sparkling (Dance Shot Ver.)" music video, and Limited Edition B had "Momoiro Sparkling (Close-up Ver.)". The Single V appeared on June 1.

== Track listing ==
=== CD single ===
All tracks are written by Tsunku.

CD
No.	Title	Length
1.	"Momoiro Sparkling" (桃色スパークリング)	4:05
2.	"Faraway"	4:59
3.	"Momoiro Sparkling (Instrumental)" (桃色スパークリング (Instrumental))
Total length:		13:13

Limited Edition A DVD
No.	Title	Length
1.	"Momoiro Sparkling (Dance Shot Ver.)" (桃色スパークリング (Dance Shot Ver.))

Limited Edition B DVD
No.	Title	Length
1.	"Momoiro Sparkling (Close-up Ver.)" (桃色スパークリング (Close-up Ver.))

=== Single V ===
DVD
No.	Title	Length
1.	"Momoiro Sparkling" (桃色スパークリング)
2.	"Momoiro Sparkling (Close-up Another Ver.)" (桃色スパークリング（Close-up Another Ver.）)
3.	"Making of" (メイキング映像)

== Charts ==
Chart (2011)	Peak position
Oricon Daily Singles Chart	4
Oricon Weekly Singles Chart	6
Oricon Monthly Singles Chart	29
Billboard Japan Hot 100	21
Billboard Japan Hot Top Airplay	87
Billboard Japan Hot Singles Sales	6
Billboard Japan Adult Contemporary Airplay	64

=== Sales and certifications ===
The single was certified Gold with 23,961 total reported sales. It had 18,172 sales during its time at #6 in the Oricon Weekly Singles Chart.
