= Shining Power =

Single by Berryz Kobo

from the album 7 Berryz Times
- Released: November 10, 2010 (CD); November 24, 2010 (Single V)
- Recorded: 2010
- Genre: J-pop, pop
- Label: Piccolo Town
- Songwriter: Tsunku
- Producer: Tsunku

Berryz Kobo singles chronology
"Maji Bomber!!" (2010)	"Shining Power" (2010)	"Heroine ni Narō ka!" (2011)

Music video
- "Shining Power" on YouTube

"Shining Power" (シャイニング パワー) is the 24th single by Japanese idol group Berryz Kobo, released in Japan on November 10, 2010.

The physical CD single debuted at 7th place in the Japanese Oricon weekly singles chart.

== Charts ==
=== CD single ===
Chart (2010)	Peak position
Japan (Oricon Daily Singles Chart)	6
Japan (Oricon Weekly Singles Chart)	7

=== DVD single "Single V «Shining Power»" ===
Chart (2010)	Peak position
Japan (Oricon Weekly DVD Chart)	81
