= Saki Nakajima (singer) =

Japanese singer and actress (born 1994)

- 中島 早貴
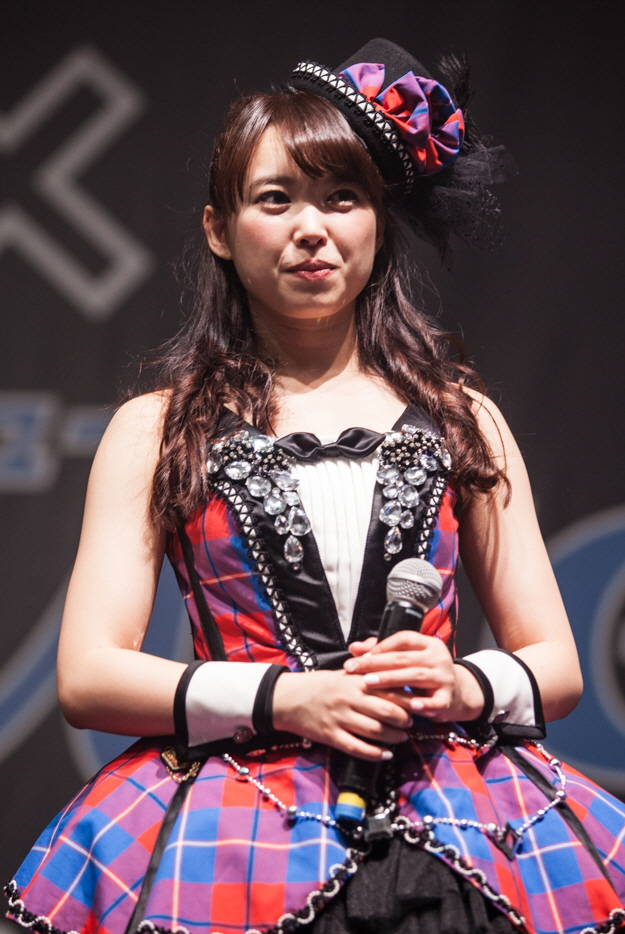
- Nakajima at Japan Expo 2014
- Born: February 5, 1994 (age 32); Saitama Prefecture, Japan
- Occupations: Singer; actress
- Musical career
- Genres: J-pop
- Years active: 2002-present
- Label: Zetima
- Website: www.helloproject.com

Saki Nakajima (中島 早貴, Nakajima Saki; born February 5, 1994) is a Japanese singer and actress. She was a member of Cute, a Japanese pop group within Hello! Project.

== Early life ==
Nakajima was born in Saitama, Japan. She joined Hello! Project in 2002 as one of fifteen children chosen from the Hello! Project Kids auditions after performing "Dekkai Uchuu ni Ai ga Aru" by Morning Musume.

== Career ==
In 2004, Nakajima did not make the original list of Berryz Kobo and the idea was eventually dropped. The remaining members ending up forming Cute in 2005. The group officially debuted in 2006, with their first official single released in February 2007. Nakajima is a member of Gatas Brilhantes H.P., the Hello! Project futsal team.

In October 2007, Nakajima was placed in the unit Athena & Robikerottsu along with fellow Cute member Chisato Okai, as well as Risa Niigaki and Aika Mitsui of Morning Musume.

In 2009, she was chosen with fellow Hello! Project Kids members Yurina Kumai and Risako Sugaya as well and Aika Mitsui from Morning Musume to be in a newly formed group Guardians 4 formed to sing the openings to the anime Shugo Chara!. She was chosen to be in the 5th-generation Hello Project subgroup PetitmoniV, along with Mai Hagiwara and Erina Mano.

During the Cute Concert Tour 2010 Summer-Fall: Dance Special!! "Chou Uranaito!!", Nakajima injured her leg and was forced to sit out the next concert.

== Hello! Project groups and units ==
- Hello! Project Kids
- H.P. All Stars (2004)
- Cute (2005–2017)
- Athena & Robikerottsu (2007–?)
- Guardians 4 (2009–2010)
- Hello! Project Mobekimasu (2011)

=== Satoyama and Satoumi movements ===
- DIY (2012–present)
- Hi-Fin (2013-?)
- Kamiishinaka Kana (2017)

== Discography ==
=== Solo DVDs ===
No.	Title	Release date	Chart position	Label
No.	Title	Release date	Oricon Weekly DVD Chart	Label
1	Saki Style	February 27, 2013	73	Zetima

== Appearances ==
=== Movies ===
- Koinu Dan no Monogatari ("The Story of Puppy Dan") (December 2002) as Chiyori Hoshino
- Gekijōban Hontō ni Atta Kowai Hanashi 3D (劇場版ほんとうにあった怖い話3D) (2010)
- Ōsama Game (王様ゲーム) (December 17, 2011) as Kana Ueda
- Zomvideo (ゾンビデオ) (2012)

=== TV dramas ===
- Sūgaku Joshi Gakuen (Ep. 8, February 29, 2012; Ep. 12, March 27, 2012) as Satoko Komaba, the leader of the honor students group

=== TV shows ===
- Hello! Morning (ハロー! モーニング) (2002–2007)
- Cute Has Come (Ep. 5, January 6, 2007; Ep. 6, January 20, 2007)
- Haromoni@ (ハロモニ@) (2007–2008)
- Berikyū! (ベリキュー!) (2008)
- Yorosen! (よろセン!) (2008–2009)
- Aimai na! (あいまいナ!) (2010–2011)
- Bijo Gaku (美女学) (2010–2011)
- Bowling Revolution P-League (February 6, 2011 —)
- Hello Pro! Time (ハロプロ！ＴＩＭＥ) (2011–2012)
- Hello! Satoyama Life (ハロー！ＳＡＴＯＹＡＭＡライフ) (2012–2013)

=== Radio programs ===
- Five Stars (October 6, 2009 — September 27, 2011; Inter FM)
- Nakajima Saki no Cute na Jikan (January 1, 2012 —, Radio Nippon)

=== Internet ===
- Hello! Pro Video Chat (Ep. 22, August 18, 2005)
- Hello! Pro Hour (Ep. 5, April 28, 2006)

=== Theater plays ===
- Romantic ni Yoroshiku (ロマンチックにヨロシク) (2009)
- Fashionable (ファッショナブル) (2010)
- 1974 (Ikunayo) (1974 (イクナヨ)) (2011)
- Stronger (ストロンガー) (2012)
- Junkers Come Here (ユンカース・カム・ヒア) (2012)
- Cat's Eye (キャッツ♥アイ) (2012)
- Sakura no Hanataba (さくらの花束) as Kanoko Asakura (朝倉かのこ) (2013)

== Solo bibliography ==
=== Photobooks ===
- Nacky (December 10, 2009, Kadokawa Group Publishing, ISBN 978-4-0489-5073-2)
- W Saki (July 15, 2011, Kadokawa Group Publishing, ISBN 978-4-0489-5429-7)
- Naka-san (なかさん) (February 20, 2013, Wani Books, ISBN 978-4-8470-4526-4)

=== Digital photobooks ===
- Alo-Hello C-ute (Nakky Version) (アロハロ！°C-ute) (September 28, 2010)
- Cutest (Nakky Version) (February 21, 2012)
- W Saki -Black- Vol. 1 (July 1, 2012)
- W Saki -White- Vol. 1 (July 12, 2012)
- W Saki -Black- Vol. 2 (July 24, 2012)
- W Saki -White- Vol. 2 (July 27, 2012)
- Alo-Hello! C-ute 2012 (Nakky Version) (アロハロ！°C-ute 2012) (October 22, 2012)

=== Magazines ===
- Weekly Famitsu Taiwan Vol. 446 (August 2, 2013)
