= 7 Berryz Times =

- Regular Edition cover

Studio album by Berryz Kobo
- Released: 30 March 2011 (Japan)
- Genres: J-pop, pop
- Label: Piccolo Town
- Producer: Tsunku

Berryz Kobo chronology
6th Otakebi Album (2010)	7 Berryz Times (2011)	Ai no Album 8 (2012)

Singles from 7 Berryz Times
- 1. "Maji Bomber!!" Released: 14 July 2010; 2. "Shining Power" Released: 10 November 2010; 3. "Heroine ni Narō ka!" Released: 2 March 2011

Music videos
- "Maji Bomber!!" on YouTube
- "Shining Power" on YouTube
- "Heroine ni Narō ka!" on YouTube
- "Heroine ni Narō ka! (Live Ver.)" on YouTube

Alternative cover
- Limited Edition cover

7 Berryz Times (⑦ Berryz タイムス, Sebun Berīzu Taimusu) is the seventh album by the Japanese girl idol group Berryz Kobo, released on 30 March 2011 in Japan on the record label Piccolo Town. As with previous albums, it is entirely written and produced by Tsunku. There are a total of ten songs on the album, including the title tracks from three previously released hit singles: "Maji Bomber!!", "Shining Power", and "Heroine ni Narō ka!".

The album 7 Berryz Times was available in two editions: regular (PKCP-5182) and limited (PKCP-5180/1). The limited edition came with a DVD that included a live performance of "Heroine ni Narō ka!" and a documentary on how the album jacket was made. The album debuted at number 3 in the Oricon Daily Albums Chart and ranked 10th for the week.

== Track listing ==
All tracks are written by Tsunku.

CD
No.	Title	Length
1.	"Icchōme Rock!" (一丁目ロック！)
2.	"Heroine ni Narō ka!" (ヒロインになろうか！)
3.	"Bomb Bomb Jump" (BOMB BOMB JUMP)
4.	"Masshiroi Ano Kumo" (真っ白いあの雲)
5.	"Maji Bomber!!" (本気ボンバー！！)
6.	"Joshikai The Night" (女子会 The Night)
7.	"Girls Times" (ガールズタイムス)
8.	"Onna no Pride" (女のプライド)
9.	"Shining Power" (シャイニング パワー)
10.	"Magical Future!" (マジカルフューチャー！)

Limited Edition DVD
No.	Title	Length
1.	"Heroine ni Narō ka! (Shimizu Saki Solo Dance Ver.)" (ヒロインになろうか！（清水佐紀 SoloDance Ver.）)
2.	"Heroine ni Narō ka! (Tsugunaga Momoko Solo Dance Ver.)" (ヒロインになろうか！（嗣永桃子 SoloDance Ver.）)
3.	"Heroine ni Narō ka! (Tokunaga Chinami Solo Dance Ver.)" (ヒロインになろうか！（徳永千奈美 SoloDance Ver.）)
4.	"Heroine ni Narō ka! (Sudo Maasa Solo Dance Ver.)" (ヒロインになろうか！（須藤茉麻 SoloDance Ver.）)
5.	"Heroine ni Narō ka! (Natsuyaki Miyabi Solo Dance Ver.)" (ヒロインになろうか！（夏焼 雅 SoloDance Ver.）)
6.	"Heroine ni Narō ka! (Kumai Yurina Solo Dance Ver.)" (ヒロインになろうか！（熊井友理奈 SoloDance Ver.）)
7.	"Heroine ni Narō ka! (Sugaya Risako Solo Dance Ver.)" (ヒロインになろうか！（菅谷梨沙子 SoloDance Ver.）)
8.	"Heroine ni Narō ka! (Dance Mix Ver.)" (ヒロインになろうか！（Dance Mix Ver.）)
9.	"Heroine ni Narō ka! (Hello! Project 2011 Winter 'Kangei Shinsen Matsuri' A-gana Live Ver.)" (ヒロインになろうか！（Hello! Project 2011 WINTER ～歓迎新鮮まつり～ Aがなライブ Ver.）)
10.	"Album Jacket Satsuei Making" (アルバムジャケット撮影メイキング, "Album Jacket Photography Making of")

== Charts ==
Chart (2011)	Peak position	Weeks on chart	Sales	
Chart (2011)	Peak position	Weeks on chart	First week	Total
Japan (Oricon Daily Albums Chart)	3			
Japan (Oricon Weekly Albums Chart)	10	3	6,167	7,782
