= Peterparker69 =

Japanese pop group

- Origin: Tokyo, Japan
- Genre: Hyperpop
- Years active: 2022–present
- Members: Jeter; Y Ohtrixpointnever

Peterparker69 is a Japanese pop duo, formed in 2022. The group currently consists of producers known by the pseudonyms Jeter and Y Ohtrixpointnever.

== History ==
Peterparker69 released their first EP, Deadpool, on February 1, 2023. The EP's lead single "Flight to Mumbai" was featured in an Apple commercial in Japan. A remix album, titled Deadpool 2, was released on June 16.

Their debut album yo, was released on July 31, 2025. The album peaked at 40 on the Oricon Albums Chart. Its release was preceded by multiple singles, including "Hey Phone", which featured Yojiro Noda. Following the release of the album, Peterparker69 toured the United States, opening for Frost Children. Teen Vogue listed yo, as one of their 15 best non-English albums of 2025. Time Out listed it as the 24th best album of 2025.

== Discography ==
=== Studio albums ===
No.	Album details	Charts
No.	Album details	JPN
1	yo, Released: July 31, 2025	40

=== EPs ===
No.	EP details
1	deadpool: Released: February 1, 2023
2	deadpool 2: Released: June 16, 2023
