= Cha Cha Sing =

- Regular Edition cover

Single by Berryz Kobo

from the album Berryz Mansion 9kai
- Released: July 25, 2012 (Japan)
- Genre: J-pop; EDM
- Label: Piccolo Town
- Producer: Tsunku

Berryz Kobo singles chronology
"Be Genki (Naseba Naru!)" (2012)	"Cha Cha Sing" (2012)	"Want!" (2012)

Berryz Kobo×Cute singles chronology
"Chō Happy Song" (2012)

Music videos
- Cha Cha Sing on YouTube
- Loving You Too Much on YouTube
- Momochi! Yurushite-nyan Taisō on YouTube
- Cha Cha Sing flash mob on YouTube

Professional ratings
Review scores
Source	Rating
Rolling Stone Japan	3.5/5 stars

"Cha Cha Sing" (stylized as "cha cha SING") is the 29th single by the Japanese female idol group Berryz Kobo, released in Japan on July 25, 2012.

== Background ==
The single was released in four versions: Limited Edition A, Limited Edition B, Limited Edition C, and Regular Edition. Each edition has a different cover. All the limited editions were shipped sealed and included a serial-numbered entry card for the lottery to win a ticket to one of the single's launch events. The limited editions A and B included a bonus DVD: Limited Edition A DVD contained the "Cha Cha Sing (Dance Shot Ver.)" music video, Limited Edition B — "Cha Cha Sing (Close-up Berry Kobo Ver.)".

The title track "Cha Cha Sing" is a cover of the song "Row Mah Sing" (Thai: เรามาซิง; RTGS: Rao Ma Sing) by popular Thai singer Bird Thongchai, and the first B-side "Loving You Too Much" is also a cover of a song by him, titled "Too Much So Much Very Much". Both were translated into Japanese. One version of the "Cha Cha Sing" music video depicts a flash mob, which was held in Venus Fort. "Momochi! Yurushite-nyan Taisō" is Momoko Tsugunaga's first solo song. Prior to the release of the CD single, the music video was distributed exclusively on RecoChoku since July 15. It debuted in the first place in the RecoChoku Video Clip Daily Ranking

== Track listing ==
CD
No.	Title	Length
1.	"Cha Cha Sing" (cha cha Sing)
2.	"Loving You Too Much" (Loving you Too much)
3.	"Momochi! Yurushite-nyan Taisō / Momochi (Tsugunaga Momoko feat. Berryz Kobo)" (ももち！許してにゃん♡体操／ももち（嗣永桃子 feat. Berryz工房）)
4.	"Cha Cha Sing (Instrumental)" (cha cha SING（Instrumental）)
5.	"Loving You Too Much (Instrumental)" (Loving you Too much（Instrumental）)
6.	"Momochi! Yurushite-nyan Taisō (Instrumental) / Momochi (Tsugunaga Momoko feat. Berryz Kobo)" (ももち！許してにゃん♡体操（Instrumental）／ももち（嗣永桃子 feat. Berryz工房）)

Limited Edition A DVD
No.	Title	Length
1.	"Cha Cha Sing (Dance Shot Ver.)" (WANT!（Dance Shot Ver.）)

Limited Edition B DVD
No.	Title	Length
1.	"Cha Cha Sing (Close-up Berryz Kobo Ver.)" (WANT!（Dance Shot Ver.II）)

== Charts ==
Chart (2012)	Peak position
Oricon Daily Singles Chart	4
Oricon Weekly Singles Chart	6
Oricon Monthly Singles Chart	27
Billboard Japan Hot 100	17
Billboard Japan Hot Top Airplay	75
Billboard Japan Hot Singles Sales	7

== DVD single ==
The corresponding DVD single (so called Single V) was released a week later, on August 1, 2012.

DVD
No.	Title	Length
1.	"Cha Cha Sing (Music Video)" (cha cha SING（MUSIC VIDEO）)
2.	"Momochi! Yurushite-nyan Taisō / Momochi (Tsugunaga Momoko feat. Berryz Kobo) (Music Video)" (02.ももち！許してにゃん♡体操／ももち（嗣永桃子feat.Berryz工房）（MUSIC VIDEO）)
3.	"Cha Cha Sing Making Eizō" (cha cha SING メイキング映像, "Cha Cha Sing" making-of video)

=== Bonus ===
Sealed into all the limited editions

- Event ticket lottery card with a serial number
