= Berryz Mansion 9kai =

- Regular Edition cover

Studio album by Berryz Kobo
- Released: 30 January 2013 (Japan)
- Genres: J-pop; pop
- Label: Piccolo Town
- Producer: Tsunku

Berryz Kobo chronology
Ai no Album 8 (2012)	Berryz Mansion 9kai (2013)	Berryz Kobo Special Best Vol. 2 (2014)

Singles from Berryz Mansion 9kai
- 1. "Be Genki (Naseba Naru!)" Released: 21 March 2012; 2. "Cha Cha Sing" Released: 25 July 2012; 3. "Want!" Released: 19 December 2012

Music videos
- Be Genki! (Naseba Naru) on YouTube
- Cha Cha Sing on YouTube
- Want! on YouTube

Alternative cover
- Limited Edition cover

Berryz Mansion 9kai (Berryzマンション9階, Berīzu Manshōn Kyū-kai) is the ninth album by the Japanese girl idol group Berryz Kobo, released on 30 January 2013 in Japan on the record label Piccolo Town.

== Compositions ==
As usual for a Berryz Kobo album, it is entirely written and produced by Tsunku, with exception of the music of the song "Cha Cha Sing".

In total, there are ten tracks on the CD. The album contains the title tracks from three previously released hit singles: "Be Genki (Naseba Naru!)", "Cha Cha Sing", and "Want!", a remix of the Berryz' first single "Anata Nashi de wa Ikite Yukenai", and a remix of "Momochi! Yurushite-nyan Taisō" from the single "Cha Cha Sing". There are also five new songs.

== Release details ==
The album is available in two editions: regular (PKCP-5224) and limited (PKCP-5222/3). The regular edition is CD-only, the limited edition comes with a DVD. A limited issue of the regular edition comes with a member photo, randomly selected from seven kinds. There is one photo of each member in the set, included in the sealed album.

== Track listing ==
All tracks are written by Tsunku, except the music of "Cha Cha Sing".

CD
No.	Title	Artist(s) / Notes	Length
1.	"Succha ka Meccha ka~" (すっちゃかめっちゃか～)
2.	"Want!" (WANT!)
3.	"Otokomae" (男前)	Momoko Tsugunaga, Yurina Kumai
4.	"Nandakanda de Ii Kanji!" (なんだかんだで良い感じ！)	Chinami Tokunaga, Maasa Sudo
5.	"Koi Itoshiki Kisetsu" (恋 いとしき季節)	Saki Shimizu, Miyabi Natsuyaki, Risako Sugaya
6.	"Be Genki (Naseba Naru!)" (Be 元気＜成せば成るっ!＞)
7.	"Massugu na Watashi" (まっすぐな私)
8.	"Cha Cha Sing" (cha cha SING)
9.	"Anata Nashi de wa Ikite Yukenai (2013 Ver.)" (あなたなしでは生きてゆけない（2013 Ver.）)	new version of "Anata Nashi de wa Ikite Yukenai"
10.	"Momochi! Yurushite-nyan Taisō" (ももち！許してにゃん♡体操（許さにゃい Remix）)	Momochi (Tsugunaga Momoko feat. Berryz Kōbō), remix of a song from the single "Cha Cha Sing"

Limited Edition DVD
No.	Title	Length
1.	"Succha ka Meccha ka~ (Shimizu Saki Close-up Ver.)" (すっちゃかめっちゃか～（清水佐紀 Close-up Ver.）)
2.	"Succha ka Meccha ka~ (Tsugunaga Momoko Close-up Ver.)" (すっちゃかめっちゃか～（嗣永桃子 Close-up Ver.）)
3.	"Succha ka Meccha ka~ (Tokunaga Chinami Close-up Ver.)" (すっちゃかめっちゃか～（徳永千奈美 Close-up Ver.）)
4.	"Succha ka Meccha ka~ (Sudo Maasa Close-up Ver.)" (すっちゃかめっちゃか～（須藤茉麻 Close-up Ver.）)
5.	"Succha ka Meccha ka~ (Natsuyaki Miyabi Close-up Ver.)" (すっちゃかめっちゃか～（夏焼雅 Close-up Ver.）)
6.	"Succha ka Meccha ka~ (Kumai Yurina Close-up Ver.)" (すっちゃかめっちゃか～（熊井友理奈 Close-up Ver.）)
7.	"Succha ka Meccha ka~ (Sugaya Risako Close-up Ver.)" (すっちゃかめっちゃか～（菅谷梨沙子 Close-up Ver.）)
8.	"Berryz Mansion 9kai Jacket Satsuei Making" (Berryzマンション9階ジャケット撮影 メイキング. "Making of the Berryz Mansion 9kai cover photography")
9.	"Momochi! Yurushite Nyan Taisô Music Video Making" (ももち！許してにゃん♡体操 Music Video撮影 メイキング, "Making of the "Momochi! Yurushite Nyan Taisô" music video")
10.	"Cha Cha Sing Flashmob-hen Hen Making Eizō" (ｃｈａ ｃｈａ ＳＩＮＧ フラッシュモブ編 メイキング映像, "Making of the "Cha Cha Sing" flashmob")
11.	"Berryz Kōbō Thai Hōmon Making Eizō 1" (Berryz工房タイ訪問 メイキング映像①, "Making of Berryz Kobo's visit to Thailand, Part 1")
12.	"Berryz Kōbō Thai Hōmon Making Eizō 2" (Berryz工房タイ訪問 メイキング映像②, "Making of Berryz Kobo's visit to Thailand, Part 2")

== Charts ==
Chart (2012)	Peak position	Sales	
Chart (2012)	Peak position	First week	Total
Oricon Daily Albums Chart	10		
Oricon Weekly Albums Chart	24	5,924	
