= Ai no Dangan =

Single by Berryz Kobo

from the album Ai no Album 8
- B-side: "Omoide"
- Released: July 8, 2011 (Japan)
- Genre: J-pop
- Label: Piccolo Town
- Songwriter: Tsunku
- Producer: Tsunku

Berryz Kobo singles chronology
"Heroine ni Narō ka!" (2011)	"Ai no Dangan" (2011)	"Ā, Yo ga Akeru" (2011)

Music video
- "Ai no Dangan" on YouTube

"Ai no Dangan" (愛の弾丸) is the 26th single by the Japanese girl idol group Berryz Kobo. It was released in Japan on June 8, 2011, and debuted at number 11 on the Oricon weekly CD singles chart.

== Track listings ==
=== CD single ===
1. "Ai no Dangan" (愛の弾丸)
2. "Omoide" (思い出!)
3. "Ai no Dangan" (Instrumental)

Limited Edition A DVD

1. "Ai no Dangan" (Dance Shot Ver.)

Limited Edition B DVD

1. "Ai no Dangan" (Close-up Ver.)

=== DVD single Single V "Ai no Dangan" ===
1. "Ai no Dangan"
2. "Ai no Dangan" (Another Dance Shot Ver.)
3. Making-of (メイキング映像, Making Eizō)

=== DVD single Event V "Ai no Dangan" ===
1. "Ai no Dangan" (Shimizu Saki Close-up Ver.)
2. "Ai no Dangan" (Tsugunaga Momoko Close-up Ver.)
3. "Ai no Dangan" (Tokunaga Chinami Close-up Ver.)
4. "Ai no Dangan" (Sudo Maasa Close-up Ver.)
5. "Ai no Dangan" (Natsuyaki Miyabi Close-up Ver.)
6. "Ai no Dangan" (Kumai Yurina Close-up Ver.)
7. "Ai no Dangan" (Sugaya Risako Close-up Ver.)

== Charts ==
=== CD single ===
Chart (2011)	Peak position
Japan (Oricon)	11

=== DVD single Single V "Ai no Dangan" ===
Chart (2011)	Peak position
Japan (Oricon)	12
