= Kyōshinshō =

Single by Radwimps

from the album Zettai Zetsumei
- Released: February 9, 2011
- Recorded: 2010
- Genre: Alternative rock, psychedelic rock
- Length: 6:50
- Label: EMI Music Japan
- Songwriter: Yojiro Noda

Radwimps singles chronology
"Dada" (2011)	"Kyōshinshō" (2011)	"Sprechchor" (2012)

"Kyōshinshō" (狭心症; "Heart Attack") is a song by Japanese rock band Radwimps, released on February 9, 2011 as the second of two singles preceding the band's sixth album, Zettai Zetsumei.

== Composition and writing ==
The song is a slow tempo rock song. It begins with a sparse arrangement of electric guitar and drums set to the same beat, along with Yojiro Noda's vocals. The song gradually adds more complex arrangements of drums, guitars and bass instruments, and reprises the sparse arrangement at the end of the song.

The lyrics of the song are a discourse by Noda, who states that it is good that he only has two eyes, as otherwise he could not keep living if he had to see all of the "grief of the world." In the chorus, he urges people to "carry a thread and needle" to sew up their eyes, so they can no longer see such grief and remain innocent. The lyrics further mention the Russian folk character Ivan the Fool.

The song took half a year to write by Yojiro Noda, and was pieced together from guitar chords and lyrics in his head.

== Promotion ==
Yojiro Noda appeared by himself on Tokyo FM radio program School of Lock! on February 2, 2011, as a revival of the band's Radlocks! radio show. The band were also interviewed in Rockin' On Japan's March issue to promote the single, as well as "Dada."

== Music video ==
The band performing the song amongst the pile of bodies, while Noda stands with the girl in a wheelchair in the music video.

The music video was directed by Kensaku Kakimoto who had previously not worked with the band on a music video before.

The video depicts the Yojiro Noda at night time in a playground, as he pushes a girl with a blindfold and headphones in a wheelchair through the park. The girl holds a flash light as they move. Through the park, the pair pass a facially deformed man and men who are fighting. Further through the park is a makeshift slum, where they pas a man on fire. The sky begins to dawn, and the people around Noda and the girl are shot. A man sets a car on fire, and is later shot down by a group of men with guns. Near the end of the song, the pair come up to a pile of bodies and severed limbs, along with people crying over their bodies. The rest of the band members perform the song in this scene. Noda leaves the girl to close the eyes of a dead boy, and covers him with his jacket. The girl gets up from her wheelchair, and drops her flash light. She screams, removing her headphones and blindfold to reveal that her eyes have been sewn shut.

Since the video was uploaded by Radwimps' official YouTube channel on February 7, 2011, the video has been viewed approximately 3,100,000 times (as of June 2011).

== Critical reception ==
Japanese critics saw the song positively, with many focusing on how important they saw the lyrics. Shin Furukawa of Rockin' On Japan felt the song, along with "Dada," contrasted with the easy to listen to nature of the band's 2010 singles, "Manifesto" and "Keitai Denwa." He felt like the song's strength was like "unprotected hazardous goods." CDJournal's listening review described the song as having "a band sound that wears grief," and the lyrics as describing "the impatience of not being able to do anything."

Hot Express reviewer Jun Yamamoto praised the strength of the lyrical content, stating that the band's message was stronger due to the straightforwardness of the lyrics used in previous songs. Mikio Yanagisawa of What's In? compared the "heavy and psychedelic roaring rock" sound of the song being similar to the 1970s works of John Lennon, and felt it was a "signature song that runs through cold, with a concealed, piercing motive."

== Commercial performance ==
In the single's first week it debuted at number two on Oricon's single charts with 68,000 copies sold - 33,000 less than the single at the number one position, Exile's "Each Other's Way (Tabi no Tochū)." This figure was 22,000 less copies than the band's previous single "Dada," but is the band's third highest debut week sales total. The song has sold a total of 85,000 copies in 2011, and by the half way point for the year was the 43rd most sold single on Oricon's charts.

The song was certified gold by the Recording Industry Association of Japan for an excess of 100,000 physical shipped copies, the second Radwimps single and only one of three to receive this certification. The song is one of ten Radwimps songs to receive a certification from the RIAJ.

The B-side of the single, "Jugemu," was popular enough digitally to chart at number 27 on the RIAJ Digital Track Chart during the single's release week.

== Track listing ==
All tracks are written by Yojiro Noda.

No.	Title	Length
1.	"Kyōshinshō"	6:51
2.	"Jugemu" (寿限夢 "Jugemu")	3:48
Total length:		10:39

== Charts ==
"Kyōshinshō"
A sample from a verse and the beginning of the chorus of "Kyōshinshō."

Chart (2011)	Peak position
Billboard Adult Contemporary Airplay	34
Billboard Japan Hot 100	2
Oricon daily singles	1
Oricon weekly singles	2
Oricon monthly singles	9
RIAJ Digital Track Chart Top 100	8

=== Sales and certifications ===
Chart	Amount
Oricon physical sales	85,000
RIAJ physical shipping certification	Gold (100,000+)

== Release history ==
Region	Date	Format	Distributing Label
Japan	January 26, 2011	Ringtone	EMI Music Japan
Japan	February 9, 2011	CD, digital download, Rental CD	EMI Music Japan
