= Dance de Bakōn! =

- Regular Edition cover

Single by Cute

from the album Chō Wonderful! 6
- B-side: "Kore Ijō Kirawaretakunai no"
- Released: August 25, 2010 (Japan)
- Genre: J-pop
- Label: Zetima
- Songwriter: Tsunku
- Producer: Tsunku

Cute singles chronology
"Campus Life (Umarete Kite Yokatta)" (2010)	"Dance de Bakōn!" (2010)	"Aitai Lonely Christmas" (2010)

Music video
- "Dance de Bakōn!" on YouTube

"Dance de Bakōn" (Danceでバコーン!) is C-ute's 13th single, released on August 25, 2010, on the Zetima label.

== Track listing ==
=== CD single ===
All tracks are written by Tsunku.

CD
No.	Title	Length
1.	"Dance de Bakōn!" (Danceでバコーン!)
2.	"Kore Ijō Kirawaretakunai no" (これ以上 嫌われたくないの)
3.	"Dance de Bakōn! (Instrumental)" (Danceでバコーン! (Instrumental))

Limited Edition A DVD
No.	Title	Length
1.	"Dance de Bakōn! (Dance Shot Ver.)" (Danceでバコーン! (Dance Shot Ver.))

Limited Edition B DVD
No.	Title	Length
1.	"Dance de Bakōn! (Close-up Ver.)" (Danceでバコーン! (Close-up Ver.))

=== Single V ===
DVD
No.	Title	Length
1.	"Dance de Bakōn!" (Danceでバコーン!)
2.	"Dance de Bakōn! (2S & 3S Mix Ver.)" (Danceでバコーン! (2S & 3S Mix Ver.))
3.	"Making of" (メイキング映像)

== Charts ==
Chart (2010)	Peak position
Oricon Weekly Singles Chart	8
Billboard Japan Hot 100	19
Billboard Japan Hot Top Airplay	36
Billboard Japan Hot Singles Sales	13
Billboard Japan Adult Contemporary Airplay	99
