= Yūshinron =

Single by Radwimps

from the album Radwimps 4: Okazu no Gohan
- Released: July 26, 2006
- Recorded: 2006 at Studio Terra
- Genre: Alternative rock
- Length: 4:10
- Label: Toshiba EMI
- Songwriter: Yojiro Noda
- Producers: Sōichi Kobayashi (executive producer); Junji Zenki (executive producer); Mitsuo Kurano

Radwimps singles chronology
"Futarigoto" (2006)	"Yūshinron" (2006)	"Setsuna Rensa" (2006)

"Yūshinron" (有心論; "Heart Theism") is a song by Japanese rock band Radwimps, released on July 26, 2006, as the second of three singles from the band's fourth album, Radwimps 4: Okazu no Gohan.

The song was popular enough to be certified gold by the Recording Industry Association of Japan as a full-length cellphone download nine months after its release, one of four songs from Radwimps 4 to achieve this. The music video of the song was also awarded at the Space Shower Music Video Awards 2007, with the award for Best Art Direction.

== Composition and writing ==
The song begins as vocals solely backed by acoustic guitar, with the rest of the band's instruments added before the first verse, with the instruments played much more frantically in choruses.

The lyrics of the song are introspective, and involve vocalist and songwriter Yojiro Noda acknowledging the "parts of [himself] that [he] hates and likes" in regards to a romantic relationship. He reasons that he decided to hate his lover as a protective measure, as he realised he would be hated at the end of the relationship no matter of how it turned out. He also reasons that one day he will want someone to love him, and that he will also make the first move then. He describes his lover as "the only earthly goddess" as well as a ningen senjou-ki (人間洗浄機, "washing machine for humanity"). He asks if she made the earth round, so that nobody could cry in the corner of it, and says that when she is not there, he looks for a corner to cry.

The song also mentions two types of people, ningen fushinsha (人間不信者, "humanity unbelievers") and ningen shinsha (人間信者, "humanity believers"). The unbelievers "curse the future," while the believers "dream of the future" and are the suicide candidates of tomorrow. Noda describes his lover as "giving eternal happiness to people who were, two second ago, suicide candidates." He believes his lover is in his heart, sending him love through his White and red blood cells.

Noda described the song is needing earth-shattering effort to create, and that the song brings the world of a person and their partner to importance. The song's title is a pun on the word yūshinron (有神論; "Theism"), however the second kanji, god is replaced with the homonym heart. Noda did this to express the fact that he cannot believe in God, however can believe in the power of humanity's hearts.

The B-side of the single, "Jennifer Yamada-san," is performed by an alter-ego of the band, called Misoshiru's. The song was the first of the band to be released under this moniker.

== Music video ==
The two out of synch Yojiro Nodas in the music video for "Yūshinron."

The music video was directed by Kanji Suto, and features a mixture of film and animated effects, often plain black patterns featuring plants, and a bird.

The video is set in a field next to a bridged river, on a wet day. It begins by following Noda as he walks forward and voices the lyrics. However, early on in the video, a second Noda appears, whose lips appear to be out of synch with the video. As the song progresses, the second Noda walks off to the side, and the video follows the first. The first Noda throws his guitar case to the ground, and becomes a black drawn tree. A bird lands on the tree, making the tree blossom and create one large apple. Out from the apple walks Noda.

Noda continues to walk to the left, where the other band members are performing the song. He continues to walk left, and encounters a television, on which an Indian man is selling birdcages in an infomercial. Noda continues to walk left, and is shown to stylistically walk across the face of the earth in black animation. In time with the lyric sanpun-mae no boku ga mata kao o dasu (3分前の僕がまた顔を出す, "the me of three minutes ago has shown his face again"), the video begins to reverse to the point where there were two Nodas, however now the video is in synch with the second. The video now tracks the second as he walks to his left, and performs the song with the other band members. The moment where the first Noda turns into a tree is still visible in the second clip, but from a different angle.

The video won the Space Shower Music Video Awards 2007 award for Best Art Direction.

Since the video was uploaded by Radwimps' official YouTube channel on July 2, 2009, the video has been viewed approximately 41,100,000 times (as of January 2022).

== Critical reception ==
What's In? review of the song calls it a "full-strength number," and notes that the lyrics are something that only could be said in a Radwimps song, and that the lyrics have great resonance. The reviewer also felt the melody "can shake your heart-strings." In CDJournal's track-by-track review of Radwimps 4, the reviewer described the song as having a "rapid development to a genre-less sound" due to the elements of rap in the song's bridge, as well as the acoustic to band transition at the beginning of the song. The reviewer described the lyrics as "rich with wit" and the melody as "undulating."

== Track listing ==
All tracks are written by Yojiro Noda.

No.	Title	Length
1.	"Yūshinron"	4:10
2.	"Jennifer Yamada-san" (ジェニファー山田さん Jenifā Yamada-san, "Ms. Jennifer Yamada")	3:44
Total length:		7:56

== Chart rankings ==
"Yūshinron"
A sample from "Yūshinron."

Chart	Peak position
Oricon weekly singles	13

=== Sales and certifications ===
Chart	Amount
Oricon physical sales	34,000
RIAJ full-length cellphone downloads	Gold (100,000+)
RIAJ streaming	Platinum (100,000,000+)

== Personnel ==
- Tomonobu Akiba - recording and mixing assisting (at Studio Terra)
- Sōichi Kobayashi - executive producer (Virgin Music Co.)
- Takashi "Koti" Kotani - equipment and sound co-ordinator
- Mitsuo Kurano - producer
- Akira Kuwahara - chorus, guitar
- Yasuji Maeda - mastering (at Bernie Grundman Mastering)
- Ken'ichi Nakamura - mixing, recording (at Studio Terra)
- Yojiro Noda - guitar, lyrics, music, vocals
- Yusuke Takeda - bass, chorus
- Satoshi Yamaguchi - chorus, drums
- Junji Zenki - executive producer (Voque Ting Co. Ltd.)
