= Zettai Zetsumei (album) =

Studio album by Radwimps
- Released: March 9, 2011
- Recorded: 2009–2011; Studio Terra (Shinagawa, Tokyo), Hitokuchi-zaka Studio (Chiyoda, Tokyo), Aobadai Studio (Meguro, Tokyo)
- Genre: Alternative rock; math rock; post-hardcore; emo; rap rock; melodic hardcore; pop rock
- Length: 74:39
- Language: Japanese
- Label: EMI Music Japan
- Producer: Junji Zenki (executive producer); San-e Ichii (executive producer); Ryō Takagi

Radwimps chronology
Altcolony no Teiri (2009)	Zettai Zetsumei (2011)	Batsu to Maru to Tsumi to (2013)

Singles from Zettai Zetsumei
- 1. "Keitai Denwa" Released: June 30, 2010; 2. "Dada" Released: January 12, 2011; 3. "Kyōshinshō" Released: February 9, 2011

Zettai Zetsumei (絶体絶命; "Desperate Situation") is Japanese rock band Radwimps' sixth album, released on March 9, 2011.

== Background and development ==
After the band's 2009 tour for their previous album, Altcolony no Teiri, the band did not perform or do any band activities for six months, with Noda in this time going to the studio alone and recording demo tapes. After the release of Altocolony no Teiri, Noda felt too cautious in writing lyrics, due to the perfection he had striven for in Altocolony no Teiri. In Summer 2010, the album had begun to take shape, with most of the songs in a completed state. Noda felt that the album was free from many of the constraints in the band's previous work, and that it was a high-energy album. He experimented with hip-hop in "G-kōi" and jazz-style piano in "Pi".

All of the songs on the album are sung entirely in Japanese, except for a brief English phrase in "G-kōi." This is very different from the band's past albums, which generally feature a few entirely English language songs, and many with large sections sung in English.

== Promotion and release ==
On June 30, 2010, Radwimps released two singles simultaneously, "Manifesto" and "Keitai Denwa," which reached number two and three on Oricon's single charts, respectively, underneath "Wonderful World!!" by boyband Kanjani Eight. "Manifesto" did not appear on the album, and "Keitai Denwa" appeared as a re-arranged version.

Before the release of the album, the singles "Dada" and "Kyōshinshō" were released in January and February 2011. "Dada" reached number one on Oricon's single charts, becoming Radwimps second single to do so since their debut.

"Kimi to Hitsuji to Ao" was chosen as broadcaster NHK's theme song for soccer events in 2011, including the 2011 J. League Division 1, the first round of the 2012 AFC Men's Pre-Olympic Tournament in June and the 2011 Copa América in July. This is the band's first commercial tie-up since "EDP (Tonde Hi ni Iru Natsu no Kimi)"'s use as the music countdown show Count Down TV's opening theme song in early 2006. A music video, directed by Daisuke Shimada and Sōjirō Kamatani, was filmed for the song. The song was given radio play from February 23, as well as released as a ringtone. Also released as ringtones on the same day were "Daidarabocchi, ""Gakugeikai," and "Tōmei Ningen Jūhachi-gō."

Radwimps took part in Tower Records' No Music, No Life? advertisement campaign from March 8 until March 21, and were featured on in-store posters in Tower Records stores across Japan. The band will also make two appearances on Tokyo FM's School of Lock! on their regular program Rad Locks!, airing in April and May 2011.

The band toured across Japan between April and July 2011, on their Radwimps Zettai Enmai Tour (RADWIMPS 絶体延命ツアー; "Complete Longevity"), performing 37 dates.

== Track listing ==
All tracks are written by Yojiro Noda.

No.	Title	Length
1.	"Dada (Dadadada Ver.)"	3:50
2.	"Tōmei Ningen Jūhachi-gō" (透明人間18号 "Invisible Man #18")	4:25
3.	"Kimi to Hitsuji to Ao" (君と羊と青 "You, a Sheep and Blue")	2:42
4.	"Daidarabocchi" (だいだらぼっち "Daidarabotchi, mythical giant")	6:03
5.	"Gakugeikai" (学芸会 "School Art Festival")	4:36
6.	"Kyōshinshō" (狭心症 "Heart Attack")	6:50
7.	"Ground Zero" (グラウンドゼロ Guraundo Zero)	4:28
8.	"Pi" (π Pai, "Pi")	3:22
9.	"G-kōi" (G行為 Jiikōi, "Masturbate")	4:02
10.	"Dugout"	4:22
11.	"Mono Morai" (ものもらい "Beggar")	5:18
12.	"Keitai Denwa (Cat Ver.)" (携帯電話 "Cellphone")	4:25
13.	"Okumanshōsha" (億万笑者 "Man with a Billion Smiles")	4:36
14.	"Kyūseishu" (救世主 "Saviour")	6:21
15.	"Tsukutsuku-bōshi" (ツクツク法師 "Cicada," hidden track (includes 8:20 of silence))	9:09
Total length:		74:39

== Personnel ==
Personnel details were sourced from Zettai Zetsumei's liner notes booklet.

Performance credits

- Kei Kawano – piano (#8)
- Akira Kuwahara – guitar
- Yojiro Noda – vocals, guitar
- Neko Saitō – violin (#12)
- Yusuke Takeda – bass
- Satoshi Yamaguchi – drums

Technical and production

- Ayaka Doki – assistant engineer
- Takashi "Koti" Kotani – equipment and sound coordinator
- Kiyoshi Kusaka – recording and mixing engineer
- Ken'ichi Nakamura – recording and mixing engineer
- Tetsuya Nagato – art direction & graphic design
- Tetsuro Sawamoto – assistant engineer
- Tohru Takayama – recording and mixing engineer
- Hiromichi "Tucky" Takiguchi – parasight mastering
- Yoichi Miyazaki – assistant engineer

== Charts ==
Chart (2011)	Peak position
Oricon daily singles	2
Oricon weekly albums	2
Oricon monthly singles	3

=== Sales and certifications ===
Chart	Amount
Oricon physical sales	261,000
RIAJ physical shipping certification	Platinum (250,000+)

== Release history ==
Region	Date	Format	Distributing Label
Japan	March 9, 2011	CD, digital download	EMI Music Japan
Japan	March 26, 2011	Rental CD	EMI Music Japan
