= Campus Life (Umarete Kite Yokatta) =

- Regular Edition cover

Single by Cute

from the album Chō Wonderful! 6
- B-side: "Tachi Agare Otometachi"
- Released: April 28, 2010 (Japan)
- Genre: J-pop
- Label: Zetima
- Songwriter: Tsunku
- Producer: Tsunku

Cute singles chronology
"Shock!" (2010)	"Campus Life (Umarete Kite Yokatta)" (2010)	"Dance de Bakōn!" (2010)

Music video
- "Campus Life (Umarete Kite Yokatta)" on YouTube

Professional ratings
Review scores
Source	Rating
Hotexpress	Favorable

"Campus Life (Umarete Kite Yokatta)" (キャンパスライフ～生まれて来てよかった～, Kyanpasu Raifu ~Umarete Kite Yokatta~; "Campus Life ~I'm Glad I Was Born~") is C-ute's 12th single, released on April 28, 2010 on the Zetima label.

The single was released in two editions: Regular Edition and Limited Edition, the latter with a DVD. The first press contained an event ticket draw card with a serial number. The Single V appeared on May 12.

== Track listing ==
=== CD single ===
All tracks are written by Tsunku.

CD
No.	Title	Length
1.	"Campus Life (Umarete Kite Yokatta)" (キャンパスライフ～生まれて来てよかった～)
2.	"Tachi Agare Otometachi" (立ち上がれ 乙女達)
3.	"Campus Life (Umarete Kite Yokatta) (Instrumental)" (キャンパスライフ～生まれて来てよかった～ (Instrumental))

Limited Edition A DVD
No.	Title	Length
1.	"Campus Life (Umarete Kite Yokatta) (Dance Shot Ver.)" (キャンパスライフ～生まれて来てよかった～(Dance Shot Ver.))

Limited Edition B DVD
No.	Title	Length
1.	"Campus Life ~Umarete Kite Yokatta~ (Close-up Ver.)" (キャンパスライフ～生まれて来てよかった～(Close-up Ver.))

=== Single V ===
DVD
No.	Title	Length
1.	"Campus Life ~Umarete Kite Yokatta~" (キャンパスライフ〜生まれて来てよかった〜)
2.	"Campus Life ~Umarete Kite Yokatta~ (Natural Lip Ver.)"
3.	"Making of" (メイキング映像)

=== Event V ===
DVD
No.	Title	Length
1.	"Campus Life ~Umarete Kite Yokatta~ (Natural Lip & Close-Up Mix Ver.)" (キャンパスライフ～生まれて来てよかった～ (Natural Lip & Close-up Mix Ver.))
2.	"Campus Life ~Umarete Kite Yokatta~ (Yajima Maimi Solo Ver.)" (キャンパスライフ～生まれて来てよかった～ (矢島舞美 Solo Ver.))
3.	"Campus Life ~Umarete Kite Yokatta~ (Nakajima Saki Solo Ver.)" (キャンパスライフ～生まれて来てよかった～ (中島早貴 Solo Ver.))
4.	"Campus Life ~Umarete Kite Yokatta~ (Suzuki Airi Solo Ver.)" (キャンパスライフ～生まれて来てよかった～ (鈴木愛理 Solo Ver.))
5.	"Campus Life ~Umarete Kite Yokatta~ (Okai Chisato Solo Ver.)" (キャンパスライフ～生まれて来てよかった～ (岡井千聖 Solo Ver.))
6.	"Campus Life ~Umarete Kite Yokatta~ (Hagiwara Mai Solo Ver.)" (キャンパスライフ～生まれて来てよかった～ てよかった~ (萩原舞 Solo Ver.))

== Charts ==
Chart (2010)	Peak position
Oricon Weekly Singles Chart	5
Billboard Japan Hot 100	26
Billboard Japan Hot Top Airplay	75
Billboard Japan Hot Singles Sales	8
Billboard Japan Adult Contemporary Airplay	60
