= Futarigoto =

Single by Radwimps

from the album Radwimps 4: Okazu no Gohan
- Released: May 17, 2006
- Recorded: 2005–2006 at Studio Terra
- Genre: Alternative rock
- Length: 4:17
- Label: Toshiba EMI
- Songwriter: Yojiro Noda
- Producers: Sōichi Kobayashi (executive producer); Junji Zenki (executive producer); Mitsuo Kurano

Radwimps singles chronology
"EDP (Tonde Hi ni Iru Natsu no Kimi)" (2006)	"Futarigoto" (2006)	"Yūshinron" (2006)

"Futarigoto" (ふたりごと; "Things About Us") is a song by Japanese rock band Radwimps, released on May 17, 2006, as the first of three singles from the band's fourth album, Radwimps 4: Okazu no Gohan.

The song was first certified gold by the Recording Industry Association of Japan as a full-length cellphone download a year and a seven months after its release, followed by a platinum certification a year and four months later. As of May 2011, it is the only Radwimps song to receive a platinum certification.

== Composition and writing ==
The song is simply arranged with a band arrangement, however increases with complexity over time. Later in the song, vocal distortion is introduced, instruments are played more frantically, with drum and bass sounds increasing during the final stages of the song. The song ends with an instrumental outro, featuring distorted guitar sounds. Two versions of the song exist, the single version as well as the "(Issho ni Ichido no Warp Ver." (一生に一度のワープ Ver., (Isshō ni Ichido no Wāpu Bājon; "Once in a Lifetime Warp Version") found on Radwimps 4: Okazu no Gohan.

The lyrics of the song begin with the song's protagonist wondering if he should express his feelings to a girl. He describes how unique the girl is, such as that her beauty is "the greatest genetic change of this century." The pair begin to date, and the protagonist begins to think about the relationship. At first, he states how he cannot believe in miracles, but feels that him meeting his lover makes him want to believe in miracles. He feels that their relationship is beautiful and wonderful, because his lover calls it a miracle.

At one point in the song, the protagonist wants to write kimi (君, "you"), but instead of reading it kimi, reading it as the word koi (恋, "love"), as well as writing boku (僕, "me") and reading it as the word ai (愛, "love"). He feels like nothing could separate them if they do this. At another point, the song references the Japanese divination style Rokusei Senjutsu. The protagonist's lover insists that the protagonist's destiny star is Jupiter, and that hers is Mars, and that he is at the daisatsukai (大殺界, "great killing world") (misfortune time) at the end of his six-year cycle. The protagonist says that he's actually an earth person (instead of a person with destiny linked to a planet), but no matter if that's true, or if his destiny star is Jupiter, it's only one planet away from Mars.

According to vocalist and songwriter Yojiro Noda, "Futarigoto" along with the band's next single, "Yūshinron", took an amazing amount of effort to create. "Futarigoto" was written and recording sessions for it began even before Radwimps 3: Mujintō ni Motte Ikiwasureta Ichimai was released. The song initially came simply, and it was intended to be on the album, however the band members could not work out how to finish it. The song was recorded during the same sessions as "Setsuna Rensa"'s B-side, "By My Side".

The band's 2009 album, Altocolony no Teiri, features an answer song to "Futarigoto," called "Märchen to Gretel." The song features a reprise of the writing characters but pronouncing them as different words for love lyric, and is a response to the promise in "Futarigoto" about how someday a song will be sung about how successful that technique was. Noda was unsure why he made such a promise at the time of writing "Futarigoto."

== Music video ==
The band performing on the roof of a high school in the video for "Futarigoto."

The music video was directed by Daisuke Shimada, a long-time collaborator who worked with the band on the bulk of videos from Radwimps 3: Mujintō ni Motte Ikiwasureta Ichimai and Radwimps 4: Okazu no Gohan. The video is set at a Japanese high school during cherry blossom season, and features extremely long panning shots, showing the school's grounds. The video shows the band performing the song on the school's roof, but often pans to show the activities of different students at the school, often specifically a girl and a boy who pause as they notice each other.

Since the video was uploaded by Radwimps' official YouTube channel on July 2, 2009, the video has been viewed approximately 43 million times (as of November 2019).

== Critical reception ==
The What's In? review of the song noted "wonderful growth" with the release after the band's album Radwimps 3, and felt the lyrics had a "unique point of view," that listeners could spontaneously laugh and cry to. The reviewer described the song as "a complete love song." In CDJournal's track-by-track review of Radwimps 4, the reviewer described the song as a "having a depth that expanded everywhere, with an unpredictable melody." The reviewer felt the lyrics were a fusion of humorous and romantic, and of straightforward feelings about youth and love.

== Track listing ==
All tracks are written by Yojiro Noda.

No.	Title	Length
1.	"Futarigoto"	4:17
2.	"Loveable" (ラバボー Rababō)	5:43
Total length:		10:00

== Chart rankings ==
"Futarigoto" (Isshō ni Ichido no Warp Ver.)
The version of "Futarigoto" that appears on Radwimps 4.

Chart	Peak position
Oricon weekly singles	16

=== Sales and certifications ===
Chart	Amount
Oricon physical sales	27,000
RIAJ full-length cellphone downloads	Platinum (250,000+)
RIAJ streaming	Gold (50,000,000+)
