= Hello Pro! Time =

- Genre: Variety
- Starring: Morning Musume, Berryz Kobo, Cute, Erina Mano, S/mileage
- Narrated by: Yuka Amaya
- Country of origin: Japan
- Original language: Japanese
- No. of episodes: 58

Production
- Camera setup: Multi-camera
- Running time: 27 minutes

Original release
- Release: 21 April 2011 – 31 May 2012

Related
- Bijyogaku(japanese); Hello! SATOYAMA Life(japanese)

Hello! Pro Time (ハロプロ!TIME) was a weekly Japanese TV show featuring Hello! Project members. The series was broadcast on TV Tokyo network and BS-JAPAN from 21 April 2011 to 31 May 2012.

== Network & on-air time ==
- TV Tokyo (Kantou area and the Eastern district of Shizuoka Prefecture) - Friday 1:00-1:30 (JST)
- Satellite Broadcasting - Saturday 9:30-10:00 (1-day delay)
- Shiga prefecture area - Tuesday 18:25-18:55 (19 days delay)
- Fukuoka prefecture area - Sunday 6:30-7:00 (17 days delay)
