= Yojiro Noda =

Japanese musician

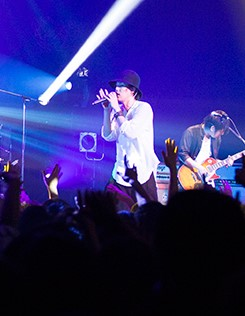
- Noda performing with Radwimps in 2015

Background information
- Also known as: illion; Yoji Noda
- Born: Yojiro Noda; July 5, 1985 (age 41); Japan
- Origin: Tokyo, Japan
- Genres: Alternative rock; punk rock
- Occupations: Singer; songwriter; musician; record producer
- Instruments: Vocals; guitar; piano
- Years active: 2001–present
- Label: Warner
- Member of: Radwimps
- Website: illion-web.com

Yojiro Noda (Japanese: 野田洋次郎, Hepburn: Noda Yōjirō; born July 5, 1985) is a Japanese singer, songwriter, musician, record producer and actor. Noda is the lead vocalist, songwriter and guitarist of the Japanese rock band Radwimps and also began a solo project, illion, in 2012.

== Life and career ==
=== Early life, Radwimps ===
Noda was born in Tokyo, Japan, to a businessman father and piano teacher mother. From the ages of six to ten, Noda lived overseas in the United States. He first became interested in the guitar in junior high school, after hearing Oasis. He tried to learn how to play the chords with a guitar his family owned.

While studying his first year of high school at Tōin Gakuen in Yokohama, he joined a band in 2001. He joined after being asked by a friend to be the band's vocalist. The band was named Radwimps, and Noda became the band's vocalist, guitarist, and sole songwriter. They released their debut independent album, Radwimps, in 2003, and the band made their major debut under Toshiba EMI in 2005. In 2006, the band became widely popular in Japan, with their fourth album Radwimps 4: Okazu no Gohan being certified platinum.

In 2008, Noda produced a song for another artist for the first time. He wrote and produced the song "Labrador" for Japanese singer Chara, which was used as the leading promotional track for her album Honey. In 2015, Noda wrote the song "Oaiko" (おあいこ; "Draw") for Hanaregumi's sixth studio album What Are You Looking For.

=== Solo career ===
Noda's solo project, Illion, was first announced in November 2012. He began the solo career to perform overseas, which is a goal his band, Radwimps, did not share. His debut album, Ubu, was released in Japan and Europe, first on February 25, 2013, in the United Kingdom. The album was promoted with two singles, "Brain Drain" in January 2013, which received a 24-hour exclusive live music video, and "Maharoba," which was released in February 2013. Noda first performed live as Illion at the O2 Shepherd's Bush Empire in London on March 17, 2013. He also performed at the Indra Musikclub in Hamburg, Germany on March 19. He planned to perform at the Tokyo Rocks rock festival in Tokyo on May 12, however the event was cancelled.

In 2015, Noda made his debut as an actor in the film Pieta in the Toilet, which he starred in as the lead character Hiroshi. Radwimps also performed the theme song for the film, entitled "Picnic" (ピクニック). In May, Noda debuted as an author with Rarirure-ron, a book of essays written while RADWIMPS were on their Grand Prix 2014 Jikkyō Namachūkei tour of Japan, as well as his decision to star in Pieta in the Toilet.

In 2016, Noda resumed his Illion solo project with a series of live concerts in July. This began with a performance at the Fuji Rock Festival, followed by two solo billed concerts in Tokyo and Osaka, billed as his Illion Japan Tour 2016.

In 2019, Noda composed the theme song 気まぐれ雲 for the movie Day and Night. In 2024, he provided the music for the Netflix film The Parades.

Noda provided original songs for the television series Glass Heart in 2025 including writing the lyrics for the single "Crystalline Echo". The song ranked first in Spotify's "Daily Viral Songs" in Japan in the second week of August 2025. Also in 2025, he collaborated with Peterparker69 on the song "Hey Phone", which reached fourth on Spotify's "Daily Viral Songs" chart.

== Discography ==
=== Studio albums ===
List of albums, with selected chart positions
Title	Album details	Peak positions
Title	Album details	JPN
Ubu	As Illion; Released: February 25, 2013; Label: Warner; Formats: CD, digital download, LP	7
P.Y.L	As Illion; Released: October 12, 2016; Label: Warner; Formats: CD, CD/DVD, digital download, LP	8

=== Singles ===
List of singles, with selected chart positions
Title	Year	Peak chart positions	Album
Title	Year	Billboard Japan Hot 100 (Note: Sources for chart positions are as follows: "Brain Drain", "Mahoroba", "By My Side".)	Album
"Brain Drain" (Illion)	2013	30	Ubu
"Mahoroba" (Illion)	2013	27	Ubu
"By My Side" (バイ・マイ・サイ, Bai Mai Sai) (Note: Originally released on Radwimps' 2006 single "Setsuna Rensa" as a B-side, it was re-recorded as a charity single to fundraise for the 2016 Kumamoto earthquakes.) (Yojiro Noda (Radwimps) / Taka (One Ok Rock)	2016	46	Non-album single
"Water Lily" (Illion)	2016	—	P.Y.L
"Hilight" (Illion featuring 5lack)	2016	—	P.Y.L
"Told U So" (Illion)	2016	—	P.Y.L
"Miracle" (Illion)	2017	—	P.Y.L
"—" denotes items which did not chart.

== Production discography ==
List of songs, with selected chart positions
Title	Year	Peak chart positions		Album
Title	Year	Oricon Singles Charts (Note: Sources for chart positions are as follows: "Chōchō Musubi", "Furaregai Girl".)	Billboard Japan Hot 100 (Note: Sources for chart positions are as follows: "Labrador", "EMI", "Oaiko", "Chōchō Musubi", "Furaregai Girl".)	Album
"Labrador" (ラブラドール, Raburadōru) (Chara)	2008	—	67	Honey
"EMI" (Terakoya)	2010	—	81	Non-album single
"Oaiko" (おあいこ; "Draw") (Hanaregumi)	2015	—	87	What Are You Looking For
"Chōchō Musubi" (蝶々結び; "Bow") (Aimer)	2016	10	8	Daydream
"Furaregai Girl" (フラレガイガール; "Girl Who Should Be Rejected") (Sayuri)	2016	17	22	Mikazuki no Koukai
"—" denotes items which were not released as physical singles, so did not qualify for the Oricon singles chart.

== Filmography ==
Year	Title	Role	Notes	Ref.
2015	Pieta in the Toilet (トイレのピエタ, Toire no Pieta)	Hiroshi		
2017	Million Yen Women (TV) (100万円の女たち, 100 Manen no Onna-tachi)	Shin Michima		
2018	Isle of Dogs	News Anchor (voice)	American film	
2018	The Miracle of Crybaby Shottan (泣き虫しょったんの奇跡)	Yuya Suzuki		
2020	Yell (TV)	Masato Kogarashi	Asadora	
2021	It's a Flickering Life	Terashin		

== Bibliography ==
- Rarirure-ron (ラリルレ論) (2015), Bungeishunjū, ISBN 416390235X
