= Radwimps 4: Okazu no Gohan =

2006 studio album by Radwimps

Studio album by Radwimps
- Released: December 6, 2006
- Recorded: 2006
- Genre: Alternative rock; pop rock; math pop; emo; power pop
- Length: 55:31
- Language: Japanese, English
- Label: Toshiba EMI
- Producer: Ryō Takagi

Radwimps chronology
Radwimps 3: Mujintō ni Motte Ikiwasureta Ichimai (2006)	Radwimps 4: Okazu no Gohan (2006)	Altocolony no Teiri (2009)

Singles from Radwimps 4: Okazu no Gohan
- 1. "Futarigoto" Released: May 17, 2006; 2. "Yūshinron" Released: July 26, 2006; 3. "Setsuna Rensa" Released: November 8, 2006

Radwimps 4: Okazu no Gohan (おかずのごはん; "Rice Side Dish"), stylised as RADWIMPS 4 ~Okazu no Gohan~, is Japanese rock band Radwimps' fourth album, released on December 6, 2006. It was the band's break-through commercial album, debuting at number five on Oricon's albums chart, and was their first album to be certified platinum by the RIAJ.

"Yūshinron" was awarded in 2007 in the Space Shower Music Video Awards, with the award for best art direction.

== Background and development ==
After the band's Radwimps Haruna Tour in September 2005, the band rush-recorded five songs, including the singles "Futarigoto" and "Yūshinron". These two songs took up an extreme amount of effort for the band. "Futarigoto" was a song originally intended for Radwimps 3, however as the band could not work out how to complete the song properly, it was shelved. "By My Side", the B-side on the "Setsuna Rensa" single was also a part of these sessions. Work on Radwimps 3 was finalised in December 2005, but as the band still had many things they wanted to try, they immediately started work on their next album.

For the band's fourth album, the members consciously focused on the sound the band had. This is in comparison to the band's first album, in which they had an image, but had not really considered what it was. However, the band did not start out with a particular concept to work around. Vocalist and lyricist Yojiro Noda noted that while lyrics were the central point of Radwimps 3, the importance of the lyrics were more balanced with other aspects in Radwimps 4. When the band recorded "Bagoodbye" (after the sessions that produced "Yūshinron"), they noted there was stylistically something good about it, and then considered it the focal stylistic point of the album. Noda also felt that it was exactly the sort of statement Radwimps had wanted to make in a song. Radwimps 4 felt like a point in experimentation where the band had wanted to get to, where in Radwimps 2 they first felt this desire, and in Radwimps 3 they felt closer to their target.

"Enren" is the first Radwimps song based around fictional events. It was created by Noda after fans had kept requesting a long-distance relationship-themed song.

Many of the song titles in the album contain wordplay. "05410-(n)" is goroawase (writing numbers and using their phonetic pronunciations) for the Japanese word okoshite (起こして; to wake someone up). The -(ん) in the title is intended to indicate the 10 should be pronounced as the English word ten, but with the n removed. "Masumaru" is written with the hiragana masu, followed by a Japanese-style circle full-stop, in this instance pronounced maru (丸; circle). The resulting name, masumaru, which is similar to the Japanese pronunciation to marshmallow, mashumaro (マシュマロ).

"Setsuna Rensa" and "Sanbyōshi" are songs with multiple readings of the same words. In "Setsuna Rensa", rensa (連鎖) means chain/connection, while setsuna has a dual meaning of setsunai (切ない; painful) and setsuna (刹那; moment). Sanbyōshi (三拍子) is the Japanese word for 3/4 metre, while san in the title is given the different kanji 傘, which means umbrella.

Of the songs on the album, eight are sung completely in Japanese, two primarily in Japanese with English phrases, one entirely in English, and three primarily in English with Japanese stanzas.

== Promotion and release ==
The band's third album was released in February 2006, and throughout the rest of 2006, the band toured and released three singles: "Futarigoto" in May, "Yūshinron" in July and "Setsuna Rensa" in November.

After the album's release, the songs "Iin Desu ka?" and "Me Me She" received music videos, both directed by long-time collaborator with the band, Daisuke Shimada.

In promotion of the album, the band toured throughout March and April 2007, on their 15 date Harumaki (春巻き; spring-roll) tour. The tour was released on DVD in July 2007, and was the number one selling music DVD for the week.

== Track listing ==
All tracks are written by Yojiro Noda.

No.	Title	Length
1.	"Futarigoto (Isshō ni Ichido no Warp Ver.)" (ふたりごと 一生に一度のワープ ver. "Things About Us (Once in a Lifetime Warp Ver.)")	4:46
2.	"Gimme Gimmick" (ギミギミック Gimigimikku)	2:37
3.	"05410-(n)" (05410-(ん) Okoshite, "Wake Me Up")	3:08
4.	"Me Me She" (Memeshii, "Effeminate")	4:40
5.	"Yūshinron" (有心論 "Heart Theism")	4:09
6.	"Enren" (遠恋 "Distance Love")	4:39
7.	"Setsuna Rensa" (セツナレンサ "Painful Moment Chain")	3:21
8.	"Iin Desu ka?" (いいんですか? "Is It Okay?")	4:06
9.	"Yubikiri Genman" (指きりげんまん "Pinky Promise")	4:03
10.	"Sanbyōshi" (傘拍子 "Umbrella 3/4 Metre")	4:00
11.	"Masumaru" (ます。 "Marshmallow")	2:14
12.	"Yume Banchi" (夢番地 "Dream Street Address")	4:59
13.	"Bagoodbye" (バグッバイ Bagubbai, "Bad Goodbye")	5:29
14.	"Yonaki" (夜泣き "Night Tears", hidden track preceded by 1:10 of silence)	2:08
Total length:		55:31

== Chart rankings ==
Chart	Peak position
Oricon Weekly Albums	5
Oricon Yearly Albums	76

=== Sales and certifications ===
Chart	Amount
Oricon physical sales	345,000
RIAJ physical shipping certification	Platinum (250,000+)

== Release history ==
Region	Date	Format	Distributing label
Japan	December 6, 2006	CD, digital download	Toshiba EMI
South Korea	December 6, 2006	Digital download	Warner Music Korea
Taiwan	December 8, 2006	CD	Gold Typhoon
Japan	December 23, 2006	Rental CD	Toshiba EMI
