= Brainstorming / Kimi Sae Ireba Nani mo Iranai =

- Regular Edition A cover

Single by Morning Musume

from the album The Best! ~Updated Morning Musume~
- Released: April 17, 2013 (Japan)
- Genre: J-pop; house; electronica
- Label: Zetima

Morning Musume singles chronology
"Help Me!!" (2013)	"Brainstorming / Kimi Sae Ireba Nani mo Iranai" (2013)	"Wagamama Ki no Mama Ai no Joke / Ai no Gundan" (2013)

Music videos
- Brainstorming on YouTube
- Kimi Sae Ireba Nani mo Iranai on YouTube
- Brainstorming (Loose Shot Ver.) on YouTube
- Kimi Sae Ireba Nani mo Iranai (Dance Shot Ver.) on YouTube

"Brainstorming / Kimi Sae Ireba Nani mo Iranai" (ブレインストーミング／君さえ居れば何も要らない, Bureinsutōmingu/Kimi Sae Ireba Nani mo Iranai; Brainstorming/Don't want anything but you) is the 53rd single by the J-pop girl group Morning Musume, released in Japan on April 17, 2013.

== Release details ==
This is Morning Musume's third double A-side single, following "Kono Chikyū no Heiwa o Honki de Negatterun Da yo! / Kare to Issho ni Omise ga Shitai!" and "One Two Three / The Matenrō Show", and the final single to feature sixth generation member Reina Tanaka, who announced that she would graduate at the end of the group's spring tour.

The "Loose Shot Ver." of "Brainstorming" was uploaded to the official Morning Musume YouTube channel on February 27, 2013, while the Dance Shot of "Kimi Sae Ireba Nani mo Iranai" followed on March 13, 2013. The full versions of each video were uploaded to the channel on March 30 and April 10, respectively, with both English and Japanese subtitles.

The single will be released in seven versions: regular editions A and B and five limited editions: A, B, C, D, and E. The Limited Editions A, B, and C will come with a bonus DVD, while all the other editions will be CD-only. Each limited edition will also include an entry card for the lottery to win a launch event ticket.

After the graduation of Reina, Mizuki Fukumura and Masaki Sato received her lines.

== Members at time of single ==
- 6th generation: Sayumi Michishige, Reina Tanaka (last single)
- 9th generation: Mizuki Fukumura, Erina Ikuta, Riho Sayashi, Kanon Suzuki
- 10th generation: Haruna Iikubo, Ayumi Ishida, Masaki Sato, Haruka Kudo
- 11th generation: Sakura Oda

Brainstorming Vocalists

Main Voc: Reina Tanaka, Riho Sayashi

Center Voc: Sayumi Michishige, Mizuki Fukumura, Haruna Iikubo, Ayumi Ishida, Masaki Sato, Sakura Oda

Minor Voc: Erina Ikuta, Kanon Suzuki, Haruka Kudo

Kimi Sae Ireba Nani mo Iranai Vocalists

Main Voc: Reina Tanaka, Riho Sayashi

Center Voc: Ayumi Ishida, Sakura Oda

Minor Voc: Sayumi Michishige, Mizuki Fukumura, Erina Ikuta, Kanon Suzuki, Haruna Iikubo, Masaki Sato Haruka Kudo

== Track listing ==
=== Regular Edition A ===
All tracks are written by Tsunku.

CD
No.	Title	Artist(s)	Length
1.	"Brainstorming" (ブレインストーミング)
2.	"Kimi Sae Ireba Nani mo Iranai" (君さえ居れば何も要らない)
3.	"Rock no Teigi" (Rock の定義)	Reina Tanaka
4.	"Brainstorming (Instrumental)" (ブレインストーミング （Instrumental）)
5.	"Kimi Sae Ireba Nani mo Iranai (Instrumental)" (君さえ居れば何も要らない （Instrumental）)

=== Limited Editions A, B, C, Regular Edition B ===
CD
No.	Title	Length
1.	"Brainstorming" (ブレインストーミング)
2.	"Kimi Sae Ireba Nani mo Iranai" (君さえ居れば何も要らない)
3.	"A B C D E-cha E-cha Shitai" (A B C D E-cha E-cha したい)
4.	"Brainstorming (Instrumental)" (ブレインストーミング （Instrumental）)
5.	"Kimi Sae Ireba Nani mo Iranai (Instrumental)" (君さえ居れば何も要らない （Instrumental）)

Limited Edition A DVD
No.	Title	Length
1.	"Brainstorming (Music Video)"
2.	"Brainstorming (Dance Shot Ver.)"

Limited Edition B DVD
No.	Title	Length
1.	"Kimi Sae Ireba Nani mo Iranai (Music Video)"
2.	"Kimi Sae Ireba Nani mo Iranai (Close-up Ver.)"

Limited Edition C DVD
No.	Title	Length
1.	"Rock no Teigi (Music Video)"
2.	"Brainstorming / Kimi Sae Ireba Nani mo Iranai (Making Of)"

=== Limited Edition D ===
CD
No.	Title	Artist(s)	Length
1.	"Brainstorming" (ブレインストーミング)
2.	"Kimi Sae Ireba Nani mo Iranai" (君さえ居れば何も要らない)
3.	"Tokimeku Tokimeke" (トキメクトキメケ)	Sayumi Michishige, Mizuki Fukumura, Erina Ikuta, Haruna Iikubo, Ayumi Ishida
4.	"Brainstorming (Instrumental)" (ブレインストーミング （Instrumental）)
5.	"Kimi Sae Ireba Nani mo Iranai (Instrumental)" (君さえ居れば何も要らない （Instrumental）)

=== Limited Edition E ===
CD
No.	Title	Artist(s)	Length
1.	"Brainstorming" (ブレインストーミング)
2.	"Kimi Sae Ireba Nani mo Iranai" (君さえ居れば何も要らない)
3.	"Itsumo to Onnaji Seifuku de" (いつもとおんなじ制服で)	Riho Sayashi, Kanon Suzuki, Masaki Sato, Haruka Kudo, Sakura Oda
4.	"Brainstorming (Instrumental)" (ブレインストーミング （Instrumental）)
5.	"Kimi Sae Ireba Nani mo Iranai (Instrumental)" (君さえ居れば何も要らない （Instrumental）)

== Bonus ==
Sealed into all the Limited Editions

- Event ticket lottery card with a serial number

== Charts ==
Chart (2013)	Peak position
Oricon Daily Singles Chart	1
Oricon Weekly Singles Chart	1
