= List of Japanese celebrities =

This is an incomplete list of Japanese celebrities (geinōjin, 芸能人).

== Comedians ==
- Akashiya Sanma
- Arino Shinya
- Tamori
- Kitano Takeshi
- Hamada Masatoshi
- Hamaguchi Masaru
- Matsumoto Hitoshi
- Hiroshi
- Hisamoto Masami
- Sakai Masaaki
- Sumitani Masaki

See also List of Japanese comedians

== Idols (male) ==
- Arino Shinya
- Daiki Arioka
- Goro Inagaki
- Hamaguchi Masaru
- Hamada Asahi
- Hikaru Yaotome
- Hiroki Uchi
- Jin Akanishi
- Jun Matsumoto
- Junnosuke Taguchi
- Junichi Okada
- Kanata Hongo
- Kanemoto Yoshi
- Katori Shingo
- Yu Shirota
- Kazunari Ninomiya
- Kazuya Kamenashi
- Kei Inoo
- Keiichiro Koyama
- Keita Tachibana
- Keito Okamoto
- Kimura Takuya
- Koichi Domoto
- Koike Teppei
- Kota Yabu
- Kusano Hironori
- Masahiro Nakai
- Masaki Aiba
- Nakajima Kento
- Nakamoto YYuta
- Riki Nishimura
- Shingo Murakami
- Ryo Nishikido
- Ryohei Chiba
- Ryuhei Maruyama
- Ryuichi Ogata
- Ryosuke Yamada
- Satoshi Ohno
- Shigeaki Kato
- Shingo Murakami
- Sho Sakurai
- Shota Yasuda
- Subaru Shibutani
- Takahisa Masuda
- Takata Mashiho
- Tanaka Koki
- Tatsuya Ueda
- Tsuyoshi Domoto
- Tsuyoshi Kusanagi
- Tomohisa Yamashita
- Toma Ikuta
- Yu Yokoyama
- Yuichi Nakamaru
- Yuma Nakayama
- Yuri Chinen
- Yuto Nakajima
- Yuya Takaki
- Yuya Tegoshi
- Rui Hachimura
- Watanabe Haruto
- Yuta Nakamoto

== Idols (female) ==
- Kanako Momota
- Sora Tokui
- Shiori Tamai
- Ayaka Sasaki
- Momoka Ariyasu
- Reni Takagi
- Akiyama Rina
- Aya Ueto
- Koike Eiko
- Nakagawa Shoko
- Natsukaw Jun
- Uehara Takako
- Yamamoto Azusa
- Maeda Atsuko
- Oshima Yuko
- Itano Tomomi
- Chise Nakamura
- Haruna Iikubo
- Haruka Kudo
- Ayumi Ishida
- Masaki Sato
- Mizuki Fukumura
- Erina Ikuta
- Riho Sayashi
- Kanon Suzuki
- Umika Kawashima
- Sayumi Michishige
- Kusumi Koharu
- Erina Mano
- Aya Matsuura
- Yuki Kashiwagi
- Mayu Watanabe
- Jurina Matsui
- Rena Matsui
- Minami Takahashi
- Suzuko Mimori
- Minami Minegishi
- Haruna Kojima
- Aki Takajo
- Emi Takei
- Mariko Shinoda
- Akimoto Sayaka
- Tomomi Kasai
- Rie Kitahara
- Rino Sashihara
- Yajima Maimi
- Sae Miyazawa
- Wakana Yamashita
- Naomi Osaka

== Models ==
- Aki Hoshino
- Ayumi Kinoshita
- Riyo Mori
- Ebihara Yuri
- Fujiwara Norika
- Inoue Waka
- Mariya Nishiuchi
- May J.
- Meisa Kuroki
- Oshikiri Moe
- Rola
- Umemiya Anna
- Yamada Yu
- Kanata Hongo
- Emi Takei
- Koharu Kusumi
- Tao Okamoto
- Suzuka Morita
- Yuka Hirata
- Honoka Miki

== Musicians / Singers (male) ==
- Gackt
- hide
- Hiromi Go
- Hyde
- Miyavi
- Nobuyoshi Kuwano
- Saijo Hideki
- Takuya Ide
- Masato Hayakawa
- Yoshiki
- Yousuke Itou
- Yuya Miyashita

== Musicians / Singers (female) ==
- Ai Otsuka
- Ai Takahashi
- Aiko Kayo
- Akiko Wada
- Alisa Durbrow
- Angela Aki
- Anna Aya
- Anna Tsuchiya
- Airi Suzuki
- Aya Hirano
- Aya Matsuura
- Aya Ueto
- Ayaka Hirahara
- Ayaka Komatsu
- Ayaka
- Ayumi Hamasaki
- Beni Arashiro
- Bonnie Pink
- Chiaki Kuriyama
- Chihiro Onitsuka
- Chisaki Hama
- Chitose Hajime
- Crystal Kay
- Erika Sawajiri
- Emi Hinouchi
- Emi Maria
- Emyli
- Garnet Crow
- Goto Maki
- Hagiwara Mai
- Halna
- Hikaru Nishida
- Hiro
- Hiroko Anzai
- Hiroko Shimabukuro
- hitomi
- Ikue Sakakibara
- Imai Eriko
- Jun Natsukawa
- Junko Sakurada
- JYONGRI
- Kiyoe Yoshioka
- Kanako Enomoto
- Kanbe Miyuki
- Kanon Wakeshima
- Kawabe Chieco
- Kawase Tomoko
- Keiko Kitagawa
- Kumi Koda
- Kusumi Koharu
- Kyary Pamyu Pamyu
- Lisa Yamaguchi
- Maaya Sakamoto
- Maeda Atsuko
- Mai Hagiwara
- May J.
- Mari Amachi
- Mariya Takeuchi
- Masako Mori
- Mei Yamazaki
- Meisa Kuroki
- Megumi Odaka
- Megumi
- Megumi Hayashibara
- Melody.
- Mew Azama
- MiCHi
- Mihiro Taniguchi
- Miho Komatsu
- Miho Nakayama
- Miho Yoshioka
- Miki Fujimoto
- Miliyah Kato
- MINMI
- Minori Chihara
- Miyu Sawai
- Mizuki Nana
- Momoe Yamaguchi
- Momoiro Clover Z
- Myco
- Mika Nakashima
- Namie Amuro
- Natsuyaki Miyabi
- Noriko Sakai
- Reina Tanaka
- Reon Kadena
- Ryōko Hirosue
- Saori Minami
- Sayaka
- Sayumi Michishige
- Seiko Matsuda
- Shoko Nakagawa
- Takako Ohta
- Takako Uehara
- Thelma Aoyama
- Tomomi Itano
- Tsugunaga Momoko
- Hikaru Utada
- Waka Inoue
- Yajima Maimi
- Yui
- Yui Makino
- Yukiko Okada
- Yuko Ogura
- Yuna Ito

== Tarento ==
- Elina Arai
- Aya Ueto
- Becky
- Rola
- Sakura Miyajima
- Kazushige Nagashima
- Kano sisters
- Mina Fukui

== Actors ==
- Eita
- Kamakari Kenta
- Fujiwara Tatsuya
- Ikuta Toma
- Matsudaira Ken
- Oguri Shun
- Ryuhei Matsuda
- Sato Takeru
- Satoshi Tsumabuki
- Shota Matsuda
- Watanabe Ken
- Yamazaki Kento
- Mackenyu
- Manpei Takagi
- Shinpei Takagi

See also List of Japanese actors

== Actresses ==
- Ai Takahashi
- Koharu Kusumi
- Aya Ueto
- Ito Misaki
- Honoka Miki
- Karina
- Koyuki
- Maki Horikita
- Mao Inoue
- Meisa Kuroki
- Mika Nakashima
- Nao Nagasawa
- Satomi Ishihara
- Yonekura Ryoko
- Yui Aragaki
- Yukie Nakama
- Kiko Mizuhara

See also List of Japanese actresses

== TV / Radio Personalities ==
- Airi Suzuki
- Iijima Ai
- Kano sisters
- Mino Monta
- Shinohara Tomoe
- Sugita Kaoru
- Mao Inoue

== Others ==
- Kurihara Harumi
- Papaya Suzuki

== See also ==
- List of Japanese actors
- List of Japanese actresses
- List of Japanese comedians
- Tarento
- Category:Japanese models
