= Help Me!! =

- Regular Edition A cover

Single by Morning Musume

from the album The Best! ~Updated Morning Musume~
- B-side: "Daisuki Dakara Zettai ni Yurusanai" (regular edition A); "Happy Daisakusen" (regular edition B, limited editions A-C); "Aishuu no Romantic" (limited edition D); "Watashi no Dekkai Hana" (limited edition E)
- Released: January 23, 2013 (Japan)
- Genre: J-pop; house; electropop
- Length: 4:39
- Label: Zetima
- Songwriter: Tsunku
- Producer: Tsunku

Morning Musume singles chronology
"Wakuteka Take a Chance" (2012)	"Help Me!!" (2013)	"Brainstorming / Kimi Sae Ireba Nani mo Iranai" (2013)

Music videos
- "Help Me!!" on YouTube
- ""Help Me!! (Dance Shot Ver.)" on YouTube

"Help Me!!" (stylized "Help me!!") is the 52nd single by the J-pop group Morning Musume, released in Japan on January 23, 2013.

== Release details ==
"Help Me!!" will be the first single by Morning Musume on which Sakura Oda participates.

The single will be released in eight versions: regular editions A and B and six limited editions: A, B, C, D, E, and F. The Limited Editions A, B, and C will come with a bonus DVD, all the other edition will be CD-only. Also, all the limited editions will include an entry card for the lottery to win a launch event ticket.

== Members at time of single ==
- 6th generation: Sayumi Michishige, Reina Tanaka
- 9th generation: Mizuki Fukumura, Erina Ikuta, Riho Sayashi, Kanon Suzuki
- 10th generation: Haruna Iikubo, Ayumi Ishida, Masaki Sato, Haruka Kudo
- 11th generation (debut): Sakura Oda

Help Me!! Vocalists

Main Voc: Reina Tanaka, Riho Sayashi

Center Voc: Mizuki Fukumura, Sakura Oda

Minor Voc: Sayumi Michishige, Erina Ikuta, Kanon Suzuki, Haruna Iikubo, Ayumi Ishida, Masaki Sato Haruka Kudo

== Track listing ==
=== Regular Edition A ===
All tracks are written by Tsunku.

CD
No.	Title	Artist(s)	Length
1.	"Help Me!!" (Help me!!)
2.	"Daisuki dakara Zettaini Yurusanai" (大好きだから絶対に許さない)	Riho Sayashi, Sakura Oda
3.	"Help Me!! (Instrumental)" (Help me!!（Instrumental）)

=== Limited Editions A, B, C, Regular Edition B ===
CD
No.	Title	Length
1.	"Help Me!!" (Help me!!)
2.	"Happy Daisakusen" (Happy大作戦)
3.	"Help Me!! (Instrumental)" (Help me!!（Instrumental）)

Limited Edition A DVD
No.	Title	Length
1.	"Help Me!! (Music Video)"
2.	"Help Me!! (Dance Shot Ver.)"

Limited Edition B DVD
No.	Title	Length
1.	"Help Me!! (Music Video)"
2.	"Help Me!! (Close-up Ver.)"

Limited Edition C DVD
No.	Title	Length
1.	"Help Me!! (Music Video)"
2.	"Wakuteka Take a Chance (Oda Sakura Ver.)" (ワクテカ Take a chance（小田さくら Ver.）)
3.	"Help Me!! (Making Eizô)"

=== Limited Edition D ===
CD
No.	Title	Artist(s)	Length
1.	"Help Me!!" (Help me!!)
2.	"Aishû Romantic" (哀愁ロマンティック)	Sayumi Michishige, Mizuki Fukumura
3.	"Help Me!! (Instrumental)" (Help me!!（Instrumental）)

=== Limited Edition E ===
CD
No.	Title	Artist(s)	Length
1.	"Help Me!!" (Help me!!)
2.	"Watashi no Dekkai Hana" (私のでっかい花)	Reina Tanaka, Haruna Iikubo, Ayumi Ishida
3.	"Help Me!! (Instrumental)" (Help me!!（Instrumental）)

=== Limited Edition F ===
CD
No.	Title	Artist(s)	Length
1.	"Help Me!!" (Help me!!)
2.	"Nani wa Tomo Are" (なには友あれ!)	Erina Ikuta, Kanon Suzuki, Masaki Sato, Haruka Kudo
3.	"Help Me!! (Instrumental)" (Help me!!（Instrumental）)

== Charts ==
Chart (2012)	Peak position
Oricon Daily Singles Chart	1
Oricon Weekly Singles Chart	1
Billboard Japan Hot 100	2
Billboard Japan Hot Top Airplay	27
Billboard Japan Hot Singles Sales	1
Billboard Japan Adult Contemporary Airplay	35

== Bonus ==
Sealed into all the Limited Editions

- Event ticket lottery card with a serial number.
