= Pyoco Pyoco Ultra =

- Regular Edition cover

Single by Morning Musume

from the album 13 Colorful Character
- B-side: "Kanashiki Koi no Melody"
- Released: January 25, 2012 (CD); February 1, 2012 (Single V) (Japan)
- Recorded: 2011
- Genre: J-pop; Synthpop
- Length: 4:56
- Label: Zetima
- Songwriter: Tsunku
- Producer: Tsunku

Morning Musume singles chronology
"Kono Chikyū no Heiwa o Honki de Negatterun Da yo! / Kare to Issho ni Omise ga Shitai!" (2011)	"Pyoco Pyoco Ultra" (2012)	"Ren'ai Hunter" (2012)

Hello! Project Mobekimasu singles chronology
"Busu ni Naranai Tetsugaku" (2011)

"Pyoco Pyoco Ultra" (ピョコピョコ ウルトラ, Pyokopyoko urutora; "Bouncy Bouncy Ultra" or "Peep Peep Ultra") is the 48th single by the J-pop group Morning Musume, released in Japan on January 25, 2012 on the Zetima label.

== Members ==
It is the first single to feature 10th generation members (Haruna Iikubo, Ayumi Ishida, Masaki Sato and Haruka Kudo). It is also the first single since Takahashi Ai's graduation from the group, and the first single with Risa Niigaki as leader.

The single was originally supposed to be released on December 21, 2011, but was delayed to January 25, 2012.

- 5th generation: Risa Niigaki
- 6th generation: Sayumi Michishige, Reina Tanaka
- 8th generation: Aika Mitsui
- 9th generation: Mizuki Fukumura, Erina Ikuta, Riho Sayashi, Kanon Suzuki
- 10th generation (debut): Haruna Iikubo, Ayumi Ishida, Masaki Sato, Haruka Kudo

Pyoco Pyoco Ultra Vocalists

Main Voc: Risa Niigaki, Reina Tanaka

Center Voc: Sayumi Michishige, Mizuki Fukumura, Riho Sayashi

Minor Voc: Aika Mitsui, Erina Ikuta, Kanon Suzuki, Haruna Iikubo, Ayumi Ishida, Masaki Sato, Haruka Kudo

Kanashiki Koi no Melody Vocalists

Main Voc: Reina Tanaka

Center Voc: Risa Niigaki, Sayumi Michishige, Riho Sayashi

Minor Voc: Aika Mitsui, Mizuki Fukumura, Erina Ikuta, Kanon Suzuki, Haruna Iikubo, Ayumi Ishida, Masaki Sato, Haruka Kudo

== Tie-ups ==
"Pyoco Pyoco Ultra" is the opening song for the Nippon Television series Sūgaku Joshi Gakuen, starring many Hello! Project members (the closing theme being "Hatsukoi Cider" by Buono!).

== Release information ==
The single was released in four versions: a regular CD-only edition (catalog number EPCE-5842) and three limited editions, containing a bonus DVD.

As usual for Hello! Project CD singles, there also was a Single V (a DVD single, containing a music video for the title song) published. It appeared a week later, on February 1, 2012.

== CD single ==
=== Track listing ===
All songs written and composed by Tsunku.
"Pyoco Pyoco Ultra" arranged by Shōichirō Hirata.
"Kanashiki Koi no Melody" arranged by Kaoru Ōkubo.

CD
No.	Title	Length
1.	"Pyoco Pyoco Ultra" (ピョコピョコ ウルトラ)	4:57
2.	"Kanashiki Koi no Melody" (悲しき恋のメロディー)	4:24
3.	"Pyoco Pyoco Ultra (Instrumental)" (ピョコピョコ ウルトラ(Instrumental))	4:57

Limited A DVD
No.	Title	Length
1.	"Pyoco Pyoco Ultra (Dance Shot Ver.)" (ピョコピョコ ウルトラ(Dance Shot Ver.))

Limited B DVD
No.	Title	Length
1.	"Pyoco Pyoco Ultra (Close-up Ver.)" (ピョコピョコ ウルトラ(Close-up Ver.))
2.	"10ki Interview (Iikubo Haruna)" (10期インタビュー(飯窪春菜))
3.	"10ki Interview (Ishida Ayumi)" (10期インタビュー(石田亜佑美))

Limited С DVD
No.	Title	Length
1.	"Pyoco Pyoco Ultra (Pyoco Pyoco Lip Ver.)" (ピョコピョコ ウルトラ(ピョコピョコLip Ver.))
2.	"10ki Interview (Sato Masaki)" (10期インタビュー(佐藤優樹))
3.	"10ki Interview (Kudo Haruka)" (10期インタビュー(工藤遥))

=== Bonus ===
Sealed both into the Limited Edition and into the first press of the Regular Edition

- Event ticket lottery card with a serial number

== Single V ==
=== Track listing ===
DVD
No.	Title	Length
1.	"Pyoco Pyoco Ultra" (ピョコピョコ ウルトラ)
2.	"Pyoco Pyoco Ultra (Another Ver.)" (ピョコピョコ ウルトラ(Another Ver.))
3.	"Making eizō" (メイキング映像, "Making-of")

== Event V ==
=== Track listing ===
DVD
No.	Title	Length
1.	"Pyoco Pyoco Ultra (Recording Ver.)" (ピョコピョコ ウルトラ(Recording Ver.))
2.	"Pyoco Pyoco Ultra (Niigaki Risa Solo Ver.)" (ピョコピョコ ウルトラ(新垣里沙 Solo Ver.))
3.	"Pyoco Pyoco Ultra (Mitsui Aika Solo Ver.)" (ピョコピョコ ウルトラ(光井愛佳 Solo Ver.))
4.	"Pyoco Pyoco Ultra (Michishige Sayumi Solo Ver.)" (ピョコピョコ ウルトラ(道重さゆみ Solo Ver.))
5.	"Pyoco Pyoco Ultra (Tanaka Reina Solo Ver.)" (ピョコピョコ ウルトラ(田中れいな Solo Ver.))
6.	"Pyoco Pyoco Ultra (Fukumura Mizuki Solo Ver.)" (ピョコピョコ ウルトラ(譜久村聖 Solo Ver.))
7.	"Pyoco Pyoco Ultra (Ikuta Erina Solo Ver.)" (ピョコピョコ ウルトラ(生田衣梨奈 Solo Ver.))
8.	"Pyoco Pyoco Ultra(Sayashi Riho Solo Ver.)" (ピョコピョコ ウルトラ(鞘師里保 Solo Ver.))
9.	"Pyoco Pyoco Ultra (Suzuki Kanon Solo Ver.)" (ピョコピョコ ウルトラ(鈴木香音 Solo Ver.))
10.	"Pyoco Pyoco Ultra (Iikubo Haruna Solo Ver.)" (ピョコピョコ ウルトラ(飯窪春菜 Solo Ver.))
11.	"Pyoco Pyoco Ultra (Ishida Ayumi Solo Ver.)" (ピョコピョコ ウルトラ(石田亜佑美 Solo Ver.))
12.	"Pyoco Pyoco Ultra (Sato Masaki Solo Ver.)" (ピョコピョコ ウルトラ(佐藤優樹 Solo Ver.))
13.	"Pyoco Pyoco Ultra (Kudo Haruka Solo Ver.)" (ピョコピョコ ウルトラ(工藤遥 Solo Ver.))

== Charts ==
Chart (2012)	Peak position	Sales	
Chart (2012)	Peak position	First week	Total
Oricon Daily Singles Chart	2	11,074	
Oricon Weekly Singles Chart	3	31,094	
Oricon Monthly Singles Chart	11	33,187	
Billboard Japan Japan Hot 100	6		
Billboard Japan Hot Top Airplay	60		
Billboard Japan Hot Singles Sales	4		
Billboard Japan Adult Contemporary Airplay	68		
