= Wakuteka Take a Chance =

- Regular Edition cover

Single by Morning Musume

from the album The Best! ~Updated Morning Musume~
- B-side: "Love Innovation" (regular edition)
- Released: October 10, 2012 (Japan)
- Genre: J-pop; electropop
- Length: 4:43
- Label: Zetima
- Songwriter: Tsunku
- Producer: Tsunku

Morning Musume singles chronology
"One Two Three / The Matenrō Show" (2012)	"Wakuteka Take a Chance" (2012)	"Help Me!!" (2013)

Music videos
- Wakuteka Take a Chance on YouTube
- Wakuteka Take a Chance (Dance Shot Ver.) on YouTube
- Wakuteka Take a Chance (Dance Rehearsal) on YouTube

"Wakuteka Take a Chance" (ワクテカ Take a chance, Wakuteka Tekachansu; "*trembing with excitement and eagerness* Take a Chance) is the 51st single by the J-pop group Morning Musume, released in Japan on October 10, 2012.

== History ==
The title song was premiered on YouTube, when on August 31, 2012, a dance rehearsal performance of it was uploaded to the Morning Musume official channel. The shooting of the music video itself was delayed due to Ayumi Ishida's and Haruka Kudo's injuries.

About a week later, another video of the dance was uploaded. This time, it was performed by the dance teachers of Morning Musume. As Morning Musume producer Tsunku explained, he wanted to show what his true intentions for the dance were and the teachers' performance captured the true atmosphere and allowed viewers to understand the concept.

== Release details ==
The single will be released in seven versions: a regular edition and six limited editions: A, B, C, D, E, and F.。

The Limited Editions A, C, and E will come with a bonus DVD containing a special version of the music video for the song "One Two Three", while the Regular Edition and the Limited Editions B, D, and F will be CD-only.

Also, all the limited editions will include an entry card for the lottery to win a launch event ticket.

== Members ==
- 6th generation: Sayumi Michishige, Reina Tanaka
- 9th generation: Mizuki Fukumura, Erina Ikuta, Riho Sayashi, Kanon Suzuki
- 10th generation: Haruna Iikubo, Ayumi Ishida, Masaki Sato, Haruka Kudo

Wakuteka Take a chance Vocalists

Main Voc: Reina Tanaka, Riho Sayashi

Center Voc: Sayumi Michishige, Mizuki Fukumura,

Minor Voc: Erina Ikuta, Kanon Suzuki, Haruna Iikubo, Ayumi Ishida, Masaki Sato, Haruka Kudo

Love Innovation Vocalists

Main Voc: Reina Tanaka

Center Voc: Sayumi Michishige, Erina Ikuta, Riho Sayashi, Haruna Iikubo, Ayumi Ishida, Masaki Sato

Minor Voc: Mizuki Fukumura, Kanon Suzuki, Haruka Kudo

== Track listing ==
=== Regular Edition ===
CD
No.	Title	Length
1.	"Wakuteka Take a Chance" (ワクテカ Take a chance, "*trembling with excitement and eagerness* Take a Chance")	3:53
2.	"Love Innovation" (Loveイノベーション)	4:39
3.	"Wakuteka Take a Chance (Instrumental)" (ワクテカ Take a chance ＜Instrumental＞)	4:40

=== Limited Editions A, B ===
CD
No.	Title	Artist	Length
1.	"Wakuteka Take a Chance" (ワクテカ Take a chance)		4:45
2.	"Futsū no Shōjo A" (普通の少女A, "A Normal Girl 'A'")	Reina Tanaka, Masaki Sato, Haruka Kudo	3:53
3.	"Wakuteka Take a Chance (Instrumental)" (ワクテカ Take a chance ＜Instrumental＞)		4:40

Limited Edition A DVD
No.	Title	Length
1.	"Wakuteka Take a Chance (Close-up Ver.)" (ワクテカ Take a chance (Close-up Ver.))

=== Limited Editions C, D ===
CD
No.	Title	Artist	Length
1.	"Wakuteka Take a Chance" (ワクテカ Take a chance)		4:45
2.	"Daisuki 100man-ten" (大好き100万点, "One Million Point Love")	Mizuki Fukumura, Ayumi Ishida	4:30
3.	"Wakuteka Take a Chance (Instrumental)" (ワクテカ Take a chance ＜Instrumental＞)		4:40

Limited Edition C DVD
No.	Title	Length
1.	"Wakuteka Take a Chance (Upper Light Ver.)" (ワクテカ Take a chance (Upper Light Ver.))

=== Limited Editions E, F ===
CD
No.	Title	Artist	Length
1.	"Wakuteka Take a Chance" (ワクテカ Take a chance)		4:45
2.	"Shinnen dake wa Tsuranu Kitōse!" (信念だけは貫き通せ!, "Keep Your Belief Absolutely!")	Sayumi Michishige, Erina Ikuta, Riho Sayashi, Suzuki Kanon, Haruna Iikubo	4:03
3.	"Wakuteka Take a Chance (Instrumental)" (ワクテカ Take a chance ＜Instrumental＞)		4:40

Limited Edition E DVD
No.	Title	Length
1.	"Wakuteka Take a Chance (Close-up Morning Musume Ver.)" (ワクテカ Take a chance (Close-up モーニング娘。 Ver.))

== Bonus ==
Sealed into all the Limited Editions

- Event ticket lottery card with a serial number

== Charts ==
Chart (2012)	Peak position
Oricon Daily Singles Chart	1
Oricon Weekly Singles Chart	3
Oricon Monthly Singles Chart	5
Oricon Yearly Singles Chart	86
Billboard Japan Hot 100	3

=== Sales and certifications ===
Release	Oricon Singles Chart	Peak position	Debut sales (copies)	Sales total (copies)
October 10, 2012	Daily Chart	1	54,047	88,977
October 10, 2012	Weekly Chart	3	81,682	88,977
October 10, 2012	Monthly Chart	5	87,727	88,977
