= Wagamama Ki no Mama Ai no Joke / Ai no Gundan =

Single by Morning Musume

"Wagamama Ki no Mama Ai no Joke/Ai no Gundan"

Single by Morning Musume

from the album The Best! ~Updated Morning Musume~
- B-side: "Wagamama Ki no Mama Ai no Joke"
- Released: August 28, 2013 (Japan)
- Label: Zetima

Morning Musume singles chronology
"Brainstorming / Kimi Sae Ireba Nani mo Iranai" (2013)	"Wagamama Ki no Mama Ai no Joke/Ai no Gundan" (2013)	"Egao no Kimi wa Taiyō sa / Kimi no Kawari wa Iyashinai / What is Love?" (2014)

Music videos
- Wagamama Ki no Mama Ai no Joke on YouTube
- Ai no Gundan on YouTube
- Wagamama Ki no Mama Ai no Joke (Dance Shot Ver.) on YouTube
- Ai no Gundan (Dance Shot Ver.) on YouTube

Wagamama Ki no Mama Ai no Joke/Ai no Gundan (わがまま 気のまま 愛のジョーク／愛の軍団; Selfishness, Mind's Condition, Love's Joke/ Army of Love), official English title being Selfish, Easy Going, Jokes of Love / "GUNDAN" Of The Love, is Morning Musume's 54th single. It was released on August 28, 2013 in 7 editions: 2 regular and 5 limited editions. The single peaked at number 1 on Oricon Singles Chart.

== Track list ==
=== Regular edition A ===
1. Wagamama Ki no Mama Ai no Joke
2. Ai no Gundan
3. Bouya (坊や; Boy) - Sayumi Michishige, Mizuki Fukumura, Haruna Iikubo, Masaki Sato, Haruka Kudo
4. Wagamama Ki no Mama Ai no Joke (instrumental)
5. Ai no Gundan (instrumental)

=== Regular edition B ===
1. Wagamama Ki no Mama Ai no Joke
2. Ai no Gundan
3. Funwari Koibito Ichinensei (ふんわり恋人一年生; Gentle First Year Lover) - Erina Ikuta, Riho Sayashi, Kanon Suzuki, Ayumi Ishida, Sakura Oda
4. Wagamama Ki no Mama Ai no Joke (instrumental)
5. Ai no Gundan (instrumental)

=== Limited edition A ===
1. Wagamama Ki no Mama Ai no Joke
2. Ai no Gundan
3. Makeru Ki Shinai Kon'ya no Shoubu (負ける気しない 今夜の勝負, I Don't Feel Like Losing, Tonight's A Battle)
4. Wagamama Ki no Mama Ai no Joke (instrumental)
5. Ai no Gundan (instrumental)

DVD

1. Wagamama Ki no Mama Ai no Joke (MV)
2. Wagamama Ki no Mama Ai no Joke (Dance Shot ver.)

=== Limited edition B ===
1. Wagamama Ki no Mama Ai no Joke
2. Ai no Gundan
3. Makeru Ki Shinai Kon'ya no Shoubu
4. Wagamama Ki no Mama Ai no Joke (instrumental)
5. Ai no Gundan (instrumental)

DVD

1. Ai no Gundan (MV)
2. Ai no Gundan (Dance Shot ver.)

=== Limited edition C ===
1. Wagamama Ki no Mama Ai no Joke
2. Ai no Gundan
3. Makeru Ki Shinai Kon'ya no Shoubu
4. Wagamama Ki no Mama Ai no Joke (instrumental)
5. Ai no Gundan (instrumental)

DVD

1. Wagamama Ki no Mama Ai no Joke (close-up ver.)
2. Ai no Gundan (close-up ver.)
3. Making of.

=== Limited edition D ===
1. Wagamama Ki no Mama Ai no Joke
2. Ai no Gundan
3. Bouya – Sayumi Michishige, Mizuki Fukumura, Haruna Iikubo, Masaki Sato, Haruka Kudo
4. Wagamama Ki no Mama Ai no Joke (instrumental)
5. Ai no Gundan (instrumental)

=== Limited edition E ===
1. Wagamama Ki no Mama Ai no Joke
2. Ai no Gundan
3. Funwari Koibito Ichinensei - Erina Ikuta, Riho Sayashi, Kanon Suzuki, Ayumi Ishida, Sakura Oda
4. Wagamama Ki no Mama Ai no Joke (instrumental)
5. Ai no Gundan (instrumental)

== Members at time of single ==
- 6th generation: Sayumi Michishige
- 9th generation: Mizuki Fukumura, Erina Ikuta, Riho Sayashi, Kanon Suzuki
- 10th generation: Haruna Iikubo, Ayumi Ishida, Masaki Sato, Haruka Kudo
- 11th generation: Sakura Oda

== Concert performances ==
Wagamama Ki no Mama Ai no Joke

- Hello! Project 2013 SUMMER COOL HELLO! ~Sorezore!~

Ai no Gundan

- Hello! Project 2013 SUMMER COOL HELLO! ~Mazekoze!~

== Television performance ==
Wagamama Ki no Mama Ai no Joke

- [2013.08.23] Music Station
- [2013.08.30] Music Dragon

== Song information ==
Wagamama Ki no Mama Ai no Joke

- Lyrics & composition: Tsunku
- Arrangement: Kaoru Okubo
- Vocals:
  - Main vocals: Riho Sayashi, Sakura Oda
  - Center vocals: Mizuki Fukumura, Sayumi Michishige, Ayumi Ishida, Masaki Sato
  - Minor vocals: Erina Ikuta, Kanon Suzuki, Haruna Iikubo, Haruka Kudo

Ai no Gundan

- Lyrics & composition: Tsunku
- Arrangement: Kaoru Okubo
- Vocals:
  - Main vocals: Riho Sayashi, Sayumi Michishige, Mizuki Fukumura, Sakura Oda
  - Center vocals: Ayumi Ishida, Masaki Sato
  - Minor vocals: Erina Ikuta, Kanon Suzuki, Haruna Iikubo, Haruka Kudo

Bouya

- Lyrics & composition: Tsunku
- Arrangement: Kaoru Okubo
- Vocals: Sayumi Michishige, Mizuki Fukumura, Haruna Iikubo, Masaki Sato, Haruka Kudo

Funwari Koibito Ichinensei

- Lyrics & composition: Tsunku
- Arrangement: AKIRA
- Rap arrangement: U.M.E.D.Y.
- Vocals: Riho Sayashi, Kanon Suzuki, Sakura Oda
- Rappers: Erina Ikuta, Ayumi Ishida

Makeru Ki Shinai Kon'ya no Shoubu

- Lyrics & composition: Tsunku
- Arrangement: Kotaro Egami
- Vocals:
  - Main vocals: TBA
  - Sub vocals. TBA
