= Ren'ai Hunter =

- Regular Edition cover

Single by Morning Musume

from the album 13 Colorful Character
- B-side: "Watashi ga Ite Kimi ga Iru"
- Released: April 11, 2012 (CD); April 18, 2012 (DVD single) (Japan)
- Genre: J-pop; electropop; dubstep; dance-pop
- Length: 4:43
- Label: Zetima
- Songwriter: Tsunku
- Producer: Tsunku

Morning Musume singles chronology
""Pyoco; Pyoco; Ultra"" (2012)	"Ren'ai Hunter" (2012)	"One Two Three / The Matenrō Show" (2012)

"Ren'ai Hunter" (恋愛ハンター, Ren'ai Hantā; "Love Hunter") is the 49th single by the J-pop group Morning Musume, released in Japan on April 11, 2012.

== Background ==
"Ren'ai Hunter" is the second single for the 10th generation members and the last single by Morning Musume to feature Risa Niigaki. It also became the last single to feature Aika Mitsui, who would announce her graduation from the group due to a foot injury that was taking a long time to recover.

== Release details ==
The single will be released in six versions: a regular edition and five limited editions. The Regular Edition and the Limited Editions D and E are CD-only. The Limited Editiona A, B, and C come with a DVD containing a special version of the music video for the title song.

The Limited Edition E is a special version to commemorate Risa Niigaki's graduation from Morning Musume. It contains an additional song, performed by her. The song is a cover of "Egao ni Namida (Thank You! Dear My Friends)" from Aya Matsuura's 2002 album First Kiss. As the group's producer Tsunku wrote in his comment about the single, the song is Risa Niigaki's favourite, although it is not a Morning Musume's song; she would always listen to it at the time when she was still a freshly joined member.

All the limited editions include an entry postcard for a lottery to win a ticket to one of two single's launch events; one will be held on April 28 in the Kansai region, and the other on May 3 in the Kanto region. So, the Limited Edition D contains the same tracks as the Regular Edition, but sports a different cover and includes a lottery card.

== Composition ==
The title track is an electropop song with a dubstep-influenced arrangement.

Morning Musume's producer Tsunku explained that he attempted to make an electronic dance music (EDM) song, wanting to create an opposite of the previous single "Pyoco Pyoco Ultra".

Also, Tsunku has revealed that the coupling track "Watashi ga Ite Kimi ga Iru" is an energetic song.

== Music video ==
Aika Mitsui didn't participate in the dance parts of the video due to leg injury.

In her close-up at the end of the music video, Risa Niigaki says silently: "Morning Musume daisuki" ("I love Morning Musume very much").

The music video was published on March 21 on Morning Musume's official YouTube channel.

On Sunday, March 25, Tanaka Reina wrote in her blog that, in the YouTube most-viewed video rankings, "Ren'ai Hunter" was currently at number 1* in Japan and at number 8* in the world.

* in the daily YouTube Charts for Music

== Members at time of single ==
- 5th generation: Risa Niigaki (last single)
- 6th generation: Sayumi Michishige, Reina Tanaka
- 8th generation: Aika Mitsui (last single)
- 9th generation: Mizuki Fukumura, Erina Ikuta, Riho Sayashi, Kanon Suzuki
- 10th generation: Haruna Iikubo, Ayumi Ishida, Masaki Sato, Haruka Kudo

Watashi ga Ite Kimi ga Iru Vocalists

Main Voc: Risa Niigaki, Reina Tanaka

Center Voc: Sayumi Michishige, Riho Sayashi, Ayumi Ishida

Minor Voc: Aika Mitsui, Mizuki Fukumura, Erina Ikuta, Kanon Suzuki, Haruna Iikubo, Masaki Sato, Haruka Kudo

Watashi ga Ite Kimi ga Iru Vocalists

Main Voc: Risa Niigaki, Reina Tanaka

Center Voc: Sayumi Michishige, Mizuki Fukumura, Riho Sayashi

Minor Voc: Aika Mitsui, Erina Ikuta, Kanon Suzuki, Haruna Iikubo, Ayumi Ishida, Masaki Sato, Haruka Kudo

== Track listing ==
=== Regular Edition, Limited Editions A, B, C, D ===
CD
No.	Title	Length
1.	"Ren'ai Hunter" (恋愛ハンター)	4:47
2.	"Watashi ga Ite Kimi ga Iru" (私がいて 君がいる)	3:59
3.	"Ren'ai Hunter (Instrumental)" (恋愛ハンター(Instrumental))	4:47

Limited A DVD
No.	Title	Length
1.	"Ren'ai Hunter (Close-up Ver.)" (恋愛ハンター（Close-up Ver.）)

Limited B DVD
No.	Title	Length
1.	"Ren'ai Hunter (Dance Shot Ver.)" (恋愛ハンター（Dance Shot Ver.）)

Limited С DVD
No.	Title	Length
1.	"Ren'ai Hunter (Dance Shot Ver.2)" (恋愛ハンター（Dance Shot Ver.2）)

=== Limited Edition E: Risa Niigaki Graduation Edition ===
CD
No.	Title	Artist(s)	Length
1.	"Ren'ai Hunter" (恋愛ハンター)	Morning Musume	4:47
2.	"Watashi ga Ite Kimi ga Iru" (私がいて 君がいる)	Morning Musume	3:59
3.	"Egao ni Namida (Thank You! Dear My Friends)" (笑顔に涙～THANK YOU!DEAR MY FRIENDS～)	Risa Niigaki	4:48
4.	"Ren'ai Hunter (Instrumental)" (恋愛ハンター（Instrumental）)		4:47

== Bonus ==
Sealed into the Limited Editions A, B, C, D, E:

- Event ticket lottery card with a serial number

== Charts ==
Chart (2012)	Peak position
Oricon Daily Singles Chart	1
Oricon Weekly Singles Chart	3
Oricon Monthly Singles Chart	9
Billboard Japan Hot 100	3
Billboard Japan Hot Top Airplay	68
Billboard Japan Hot Singles Sales	3
Billboard Japan Adult Contemporary Airplay	81

Release	Oricon Singles Chart	Peak position	Debut sales (copies)	Sales total (copies)
April 11, 2012	Daily Chart	1	14,613	49,232
April 11, 2012	Weekly Chart	3	41,036	49,232
April 11, 2012	Monthly Chart	9	48,648	49,232

== DVD single ==
The corresponding DVD single is titled "Single V 'Ren'ai Hunter'".

Track listing

CD
No.	Title	Artist(s)	Length
1.	"Ren'ai Hunter" (恋愛ハンター)	Morning Musume
2.	"Ren'ai Hunter making eizō" (恋愛ハンター メイキング映像, "Ren'ai Hunter making-of")
3.	"Suki da na Kimi ga (Live Ver.)" (好きだな君が（LIVE Ver.）／道重さゆみ・譜久村聖)	Sayumi Michishige, Mizuki Fukumura

* from Morning Musume Concert Tour 2011 Aki Ai Believe: Takahashi Ai Sotsugyō Kinen Special (モーニング娘。コンサートツアー2011秋 愛BELIEVE〜高橋愛卒業記念スペシャル〜)
