= One Two Three / The Matenrō Show =

- Regular Edition cover

Single by Morning Musume

from the album 13 Colorful Character
- Released: July 4, 2012 (Japan)
- Genre: Pop; dance-pop; electropop
- Label: Zetima

Morning Musume singles chronology
"Ren'ai Hunter" (2012)	"One Two Three / The Matenrō Show" (2012)	"Wakuteka Take a Chance" (2012)

Music videos
- One Two Three on YouTube
- One Two Three (Dance Shot Ver.) on YouTube

"One Two Three / The Matenrō Show" (One・Two・Three／The 摩天楼ショー) is the 50th single by the J-pop group Morning Musume. It was released in Japan on July 4, 2012.

== Background ==
The release was announced during the Morning Musume's May 18 concert at Nippon Budokan, at which its title and release date were made public. The song "One Two Three" was premiered at the Girls Award 2012 Spring/Summer ceremony on May 26.

This is Morning Musume's first single with Sayumi Michishige as leader of the group. It is also the first single in over 10 years to not feature a 5th generation member since "Mr. Moonlight (Ai no Big Band)" and the first in over 5 years to not feature an 8th generation member since "Egao Yes Nude".

== Release details ==
The single will be released in seven versions: a regular edition and six limited editions: A, B, C, D, E, and F.

All limited editions will contain an additional song: A and B – a track sung by the 6th generation members (Sayumi Michishige and Tanaka Reina), C and D – a track sung by the 9th generation members (Mizuki Fukumura, Erina Ikuta, Riho Sayashi, Kanon Suzuki), E and F – a track sung by the 10th generation members (Haruna Iikubo, Ayumi Ishida, Masaki Sato, Haruka Kudo).

The Limited Editions A, C, and E will come with a bonus DVD containing a special version of the music video for the song "One Two Three", while the Regular Edition and the Limited Editions B, D, and F will be CD-only.

Also, all the limited editions will include an entry card for the lottery to win a launch event ticket.

== Reception ==
The single debuted at the 2nd position in the daily Oricon singles ranking and obtained the third position in the weekly Oricon chart.

In August 2012, the single was certified Gold by the Recording Industry Association of Japan for shipment to retailers of 100,000 units.

== Members ==
- 6th generation: Sayumi Michishige, Reina Tanaka
- 9th generation: Mizuki Fukumura, Erina Ikuta, Riho Sayashi, Kanon Suzuki
- 10th generation: Haruna Iikubo, Ayumi Ishida, Masaki Sato, Haruka Kudo

One Two Three Vocalists

Main Voc: Reina Tanaka, Riho Sayashi

Center Voc: Sayumi Michishige, Mizuki Fukumura, Masaki Sato

Minor Voc: Erina Ikuta, Kanon Suzuki, Haruna Iikubo, Ayumi Ishida, Haruka Kudo

The Matenrou Show Vocalists

Main Voc: Reina Tanaka

Center Voc: Riho Sayashi

Minor Voc: Sayumi Michishige, Mizuki Fukumura, Erina Ikuta, Kanon Suzuki, Haruna Iikubo, Ayumi Ishida, Masaki Sato, Haruka Kudo

== Track listing ==
=== Regular Edition ===
CD
No.	Title	Length
1.	"One Two Three" (One・Two・Three)	4:28
2.	"The Matenrō Show" (The 摩天楼ショー, "The Skyscraper Show")	5:19
3.	"One Two Three (Instrumental)" (One・Two・Three(Instrumental))	4:26
4.	"The Matenrō Show (Instrumental)" (The 摩天楼ショー(Instrumental))	5:18

=== Limited Editions A, B ===
CD
No.	Title	Artists(s)	Length
1.	"One Two Three" (One・Two・Three)		4:28
2.	"The Matenrō Show" (The 摩天楼ショー)		5:28
3.	"Watashi no Jidai" (私の時代, "My Generation")	Sayumi Michishige, Reina Tanaka	4:16
4.	"One Two Three (Instrumental)" (One・Two・Three(Instrumental))		4:26
5.	"The Matenrō Show (Instrumental)" (The 摩天楼ショー(Instrumental))		5:18

Limited Edition A DVD
No.	Title	Length
1.	"One Two Three (Another Dance Shot Ver.)"

=== Limited Editions C, D ===
CD
No.	Title	Artists(s)	Length
1.	"One Two Three" (One・Two・Three)		4:28
2.	"The Matenrō Show" (The 摩天楼ショー)		5:19
3.	"Aisaretai no ni... (Even Though I Want To Be Loved...)" (アイサレタイノニ…)	Mizuki Fukumura, Erina Ikuta, Riho Sayashi, Kanon Suzuki	4:53
4.	"One Two Three (Instrumental)" (One・Two・Three(Instrumental))		4:26
5.	"The Matenrō Show (Instrumental)" (The 摩天楼ショー(Instrumental))		5:18

Limited Edition C DVD
No.	Title	Length
1.	"One Two Three (Dance Shot Ver.)"

=== Limited Editions E, F ===
CD
No.	Title	Artists(s)	Length
1.	"One Two Three" (One・Two・Three)		4:26
2.	"The Matenrō Show" (The 摩天楼ショー)		5:19
3.	"Seishun do Mannaka" (青春ど真ん中)	Haruna Iikubo, Ayumi Ishida, Masaki Sato, Haruka Kudo	3:54
4.	"One Two Three (Instrumental)" (One・Two・Three(Instrumental))		4:26
5.	"The Matenrō Show (Instrumental)" (The 摩天楼ショー(Instrumental))		5:18

Limited Edition E DVD
No.	Title	Length
1.	"One Two Three (Close-Up Ver.)"

== Bonus ==
Sealed into the Limited Editions A, B, C, D, E, F:

- Event ticket lottery card with a serial number

== Charts ==
Chart (2012)	Peak position
Oricon Daily Singles Chart	2
Oricon Weekly Singles Chart	3
Oricon Monthly Singles Chart	7
Oricon Yearly Singles Chart	70
Billboard Japan Hot 100	3
Billboard Japan Hot Top Airplay	14
Billboard Japan Hot Singles Sales	4
Billboard Japan Adult Contemporary Airplay	68
RIAJ Digital Track Chart	83

Release	Oricon Singles Chart	Peak position	Debut sales (copies)	Sales total (copies)
July 4, 2012	Daily Chart	2	56,139	110,475
July 4, 2012	Weekly Chart	3	100,598	110,475
July 4, 2012	Monthly Chart	7	110,475	110,475
