= 13 Colorful Character =

- Regular Edition cover

Studio album by Morning Musume
- Released: 12 September 2012 (JP)
- Genres: J-pop; electropop; dance-pop
- Label: Zetima
- Producer: Tsunku

Morning Musume chronology
12, Smart (2011)	13 Colorful Character (2012)	14 Shō: The Message (2014)

Compilations chronology
The Best! ~Updated Morning Musume~ (2013)

Singles from 13 Colorful Character
- 1. "Pyoco Pyoco Ultra" Released: 25 January 2012; 2. "Ren'ai Hunter" Released: 11 April 2012; 3. "One Two Three / The Matenrō Show" Released: 4 July 2012

Professional ratings
Review scores
Source	Rating
Rolling Stone Japan	3/5 stars

13 Colorful Character (⑬カラフルキャラクター, Jūsan Karafuru Kyarakuta) is the thirteenth studio album by the Japanese girl group Morning Musume. It was released on 12 September 2012.

== Background ==
It is the first album to feature tenth generation members Haruna Iikubo, Ayumi Ishida, Masaki Sato and Haruka Kudo and the last album to feature sixth generation member Reina Tanaka.

The album was released in two versions: Limited Edition (CD+DVD) and Regular Edition (CD).

== Track listing ==
All tracks are written by Tsunku.

CD
No.	Title	Length
1.	"One Two Three" (One・Two・Three)	4:28
2.	"What's Up? Ai wa Dō na no yo~" (What's Up? 愛はどうなのよ～, "What's Up? What about Love?")	5:22
3.	"Be Alive"	5:32
4.	"Lalala no Pipipi" (ラララのピピピ, "Lalala and Pipipi") (Performed by Sayumi Michishige))	4:45
5.	"Dokkān Capriccio" (ドッカ～ン カプリッチオ, "Bang Capriccio")	3:12
6.	"The Matenrō Show" (The 摩天楼ショー, "The Skyscraper Show")	5:19
7.	"Zero kara Hajimaru Seishun" (ゼロから始まる青春, "Youth That Starts from Nothing")	5:09
8.	"Ren'ai Hunter" (恋愛ハンター, "Love Hunter")	4:45
9.	"Chikyū ga Naiteiru" (地球が泣いている, "The Earth is Crying")	5:15
10.	"Namida Hitoshizuku" (涙一滴, "A Teardrop") (Performed by Reina Tanaka))	3:16
11.	"Waratte! You" (笑って！ＹＯＵ, "Smile! You") (Performed by the 9th and 10th generations))	4:28
12.	"Pyoco Pyoco Ultra" (ピョコピョコ ウルトラ, "Bouncy Bouncy Ultra" or "Peep Peep Ultra")	4:57
Total length:		57:22

== Charts ==
Chart (2012)	Peak position
Oricon Daily Albums Chart	5
Oricon Weekly Albums Chart	6
Oricon Monthly Albums Chart	32
Billboard Japan Top Albums	5
