= Kono Chikyū no Heiwa o Honki de Negatterun Da yo! / Kare to Issho ni Omise ga Shitai! =

- Regular Edition cover

Single by Morning Musume

from the album 12, Smart
- Released: September 14, 2011
- Recorded: 2011
- Genre: J-pop; dance-pop; electropop (Kono Chikyū no Heiwa o Honki de Negatterun Da yo); J-pop; rock (Kare to Issho ni Omise ga Shitai!)
- Label: Zetima
- Songwriter: Tsunku
- Producer: Tsunku

Morning Musume singles chronology
"Only You" (2011)	"Kono Chikyū no Heiwa o Honki de Negatterun Da yo! / Kare to Issho ni Omise ga Shitai!" (2011)	"Pyoco Pyoco Ultra" (2012)

Hello! Project Mobekimasu singles chronology
"Busu ni Naranai Tetsugaku" (2011)

"Kono Chikyū no Heiwa o Honki de Negatterun Da yo! / Kare to Issho ni Omise ga Shitai!" (この地球の平和を本気で願ってるんだよ！／彼と一緒にお店がしたい！) is the 47th single by the J-pop group Morning Musume, released on September 14, 2011, on the Zetima label. The Single V was released on September 21, 2011, a week after the CD single.

== Background ==
It is the last single by Morning Musume to feature Ai Takahashi.

== Members at time of single ==
- 5th generation: Ai Takahashi (last single), Risa Niigaki
- 6th generation: Sayumi Michishige, Reina Tanaka
- 8th generation: Aika Mitsui
- 9th generation: Mizuki Fukumura, Erina Ikuta, Riho Sayashi, Kanon Suzuki

Kono Chikyuu no Heiwa wo Honki de Negatterun da yo! Vocalists

Main Voc: Ai Takahashi, Reina Tanaka

Center Voc: Risa Niigaki, Riho Sayashi

Minor Voc: Sayumi Michishige, Aika Mitsui, Mizuki Fukumura, Erina Ikuta

Kare to Issho ni Omise ga Shitai! Vocalists

Main Voc: Sayumi Michishige, Reina Tanaka

Center Voc: Ai Takahashi, Risa Niigaki, Aika Mitsui, Riho Sayashi

Minor Voc: Mizuki Fukumura, Erina Ikuta, Kanon Suzuki

== CD single ==
=== Track listing ===
==== Regular Edition, Limited A, B, C Editions ====
All songs written and composed by Tsunku.
"Kono Chikyū no Heiwa o Honki de Negatterun Da yo!" arranged by Shōichirō Hirata.
"Kare to Issho ni Omise ga Shitai!" arranged by Kaoru Ōkubo.

CD
No.	Title	Length
1.	"Kono Chikyū no Heiwa o Honki de Negatterun Da yo!" (この地球の平和を本気で願ってるんだよ！)
2.	"Kare to Issho ni Omise ga Shitai!" (彼と一緒にお店がしたい！)
3.	"Kono Chikyū no Heiwa o Honki de Negatterun Da yo! (Instrumental)"
4.	"Kare to Issho ni Omise ga Shitai! (Instrumental)"

Limited A DVD
No.	Title	Length
1.	"Kono Chikyū no Heiwa o Honki de Negatterun Da yo! (Close-up Ver.)" (この地球の平和を本気で願ってるんだよ！(Close-up Ver.))

Limited B DVD
No.	Title	Length
1.	"Kare to Issho ni Omise ga Shitai! (Close-up Ver.)" (彼と一緒にお店がしたい！(Close-up Ver.))

Limited С DVD
No.	Title	Length
1.	"Kono Chikyū no Heiwa o Honki de Negatterun Da yo! (Another Ver.)" (この地球の平和を本気で願ってるんだよ！(Another Ver.))

==== Ai Takahashi Graduation Commemoration Edition ====
All songs written and composed by Tsunku.
"Kono Chikyū no Heiwa o Honki de Negatterun Da yo!" arranged by Shōichirō Hirata.
"Jishin Motte Yume o Motte Tobitatsu Kara" arranged by Yūsuke Itagaki.

CD
No.	Title	Artist(s)	Length
1.	"Kono Chikyū no Heiwa o Honki de Negatterun Da yo!" (この地球の平和を本気で願ってるんだよ！)	Morning Musume
2.	"Jishin Motte Yume o Motte Tobitatsu Kara" (自信持って 夢を持って 飛び立つから)	Ai Takahashi
3.	"Kono Chikyū no Heiwa o Honki de Negatterun Da yo! (Instrumental)"

=== Bonus ===
==== Limited A, B, C Editions, Ai Takahashi Graduation Commemoration Edition ====
- Event ticket lottery card with a serial number

== Single V ==
=== Track listing ===
DVD
No.	Title	Length
1.	"Kono Chikyū no Heiwa o Honki de Negatterun Da yo!" (この地球の平和を本気で願ってるんだよ！)
2.	"Kare to Issho ni Omise ga Shitai!" (彼と一緒にお店がしたい！)
3.	"Making of" (メイキング映像 Making eizō)

== "Kare to Issho ni Omise ga Shitai!" Event V ==
=== Track listing ===
DVD
No.	Title	Length
1.	"Kare to Issho ni Omise ga Shitai! (Takahashi Ai Solo Ver.)" (彼と一緒にお店がしたい！彼と一緒にお店がしたい！(高橋愛 Solo Ver.))
2.	"Kare to Issho ni Omise ga Shitai! (Niigaki Risa Solo Ver.)" (彼と一緒にお店がしたい！(新垣里沙 Solo Ver.))
3.	"Kare to Issho ni Omise ga Shitai! (Michishige Sayumi Solo Ver.)" (彼と一緒にお店がしたい！(道重さゆみ Solo Ver.))
4.	"Kare to Issho ni Omise ga Shitai! (Tanaka Reina Solo Ver.)" (彼と一緒にお店がしたい！(田中れいな Solo Ver.))
5.	"Kare to Issho ni Omise ga Shitai! (Mitsui Aika Solo Ver.)" (彼と一緒にお店がしたい！(光井愛佳 Solo Ver.))
6.	"Kare to Issho ni Omise ga Shitai! (Fukumura mizuki Solo Ver.)" (彼と一緒にお店がしたい！(譜久村聖 Solo Ver.))
7.	"Kare to Issho ni Omise ga Shitai! (Ikuta Erina Solo Ver.)" (彼と一緒にお店がしたい！(生田衣梨奈 Solo Ver.))
8.	"Kare to Issho ni Omise ga Shitai! (Sayashi Riho Solo Ver.)" (彼と一緒にお店がしたい！(鞘師里保 Solo Ver.))
9.	"Kare to Issho ni Omise ga Shitai! (Suzuki Kanon Solo Ver.)" (彼と一緒にお店がしたい！(鈴木香音 Solo Ver.))

== Charts ==
Chart (2011)	Peak position	Sales	
Chart (2011)	Peak position	First week	Total
Oricon Daily Singles Chart	2	26,411	
Oricon Weekly Singles Chart	2	49,576	55,643
Oricon Monthly Singles Chart	9	53,347	
Billboard Japan Hot 100	3		
Billboard Japan Hot Top Airplay	59		
Billboard Japan Hot Singles Sales	2		
Billboard Japan Adult Contemporary Airplay	34		
