= The Best!: Updated Morning Musume =

- Regular Edition Cover

Greatest hits album by Morning Musume
- Released: September 25, 2013
- Genre: J-pop
- Label: Zetima
- Producer: Tsunku

Morning Musume chronology
The Best!: Updated Morning Musume (2013)	Morning Musume '14 Coupling Collection 2 (2014)

Studio albums chronology
13 Colorful Character (2012)	14 Shō: The Message (2014)

The Best!: Updated Morning Musume (The Best！～Updated モーニング娘。～) is Morning Musume's sixth-best album that was released in Japan on September 25, 2013. It features updated versions of their past and recent singles with the current members of the group and it was released in two editions: a Regular Edition and a Limited Edition coming with a bonus DVD.

This is the first Morning Musume album to feature 11th-generation member Oda Sakura. The album peaked at number 6 on the Oricon Albums Chart.

== Track list ==
- All songs are composed by Tsunku

=== CD ===
1. Love Machine (updated)
2. I Wish (updated)
3. Ren'ai Revolution 21 (updated)
4. The Peace! (updated)
5. Sōda! We're Alive (updated)
6. The Manpower!!! (updated)
7. Aruiteru (updated)
8. Ren'ai Hunter (updated)
9. One Two Three (updated)
10. Wakuteka Take a Chance (updated)
11. Help me!! (updated)
12. Brainstorming (updated)
13. Kimi Sae Ireba Nani mo Iranai (updated)
14. Wagamama Ki no Mama Ai no Joke
15. Wolf Boy

=== DVD ===
1. Wagamama Ki no Mama Ai no Joke (Dance Shot Ver. II)
2. Ai no Gundan (Dance Shot Ver. II)
3. The Best!: Updated Morning Musume 'Album Making-of and Interview Video'
