= Ayumi Ishida =

Ayumi Ishida may refer to:

- Ayumi Ishida (actress) (born 1948), Japanese actress and pop singer
- Ayumi Ishida (singer) (born 1997), Japanese singer, member of the pop group Morning Musume
