= Colorful Character =

Colorful Character may refer to:

- 13 Colorful Character (2012), the 13th album by the Japanese girl group Morning Musume
- The Colorful Character, a short story by L. Sprague de Camp
