= Sūgaku Joshi Gakuen =

- Also known as: Mathematics Girl's High School
- 数学女子学園
- Genre: Comedy
- Written by: Masuhiro Yamamura; Koji Tokuta
- Directed by: Hayato Kawai
- Starring: Reina Tanaka; Sayumi Michishige; Dori Sakurada; Maimi Yajima; Airi Suzuki
- Narrated by: Dori Sakurada
- Opening theme: "Pyoco Pyoco Ultra" by Morning Musume
- Ending theme: "Hatsukoi Cider" by Buono!
- Country of origin: Japan
- Original language: Japanese
- No. of episodes: 12

Production
- Executive producer: Harokasu Morizane
- Producers: Hiroyuki Ueno; Toshiaki Nanba; Kinya Yahagi
- Running time: 30 minutes
- Production companies: AX-ON; Sugaku Joshi Gakuen Committee; VAP; D.N. Dream Partners; 4cast.co.jp

Original release
- Network: NTV; YTV (Japan); FBS
- Release: 11 January – 28 March 2012

Sūgaku Joshi Gakuen (数学女子学園) is a Japanese television drama series. It ran for 12 episodes. The cast primarily consists of Hello! Project members.

The song "Hatsukoi Cider" from Buono!'s single "Hatsukoi Cider / Deep Mind" was used as the closing theme for the TV series; the opening song is "Pyoco Pyoco Ultra" by Morning Musume.

== Synopsis ==
In the private school of Machida Special High School of Mathematics, a fight for the "No. 1 Mathematics Boss" breaks out between two high school girls, Nina (Reina Tanaka) and Sayuri (Sayumi Michishige). A male student by the name of Kazuki (Dori Sakurada), who has zero interest in mathematics gets transferred to the school due to a mistake in the handling procedure.

== Cast ==
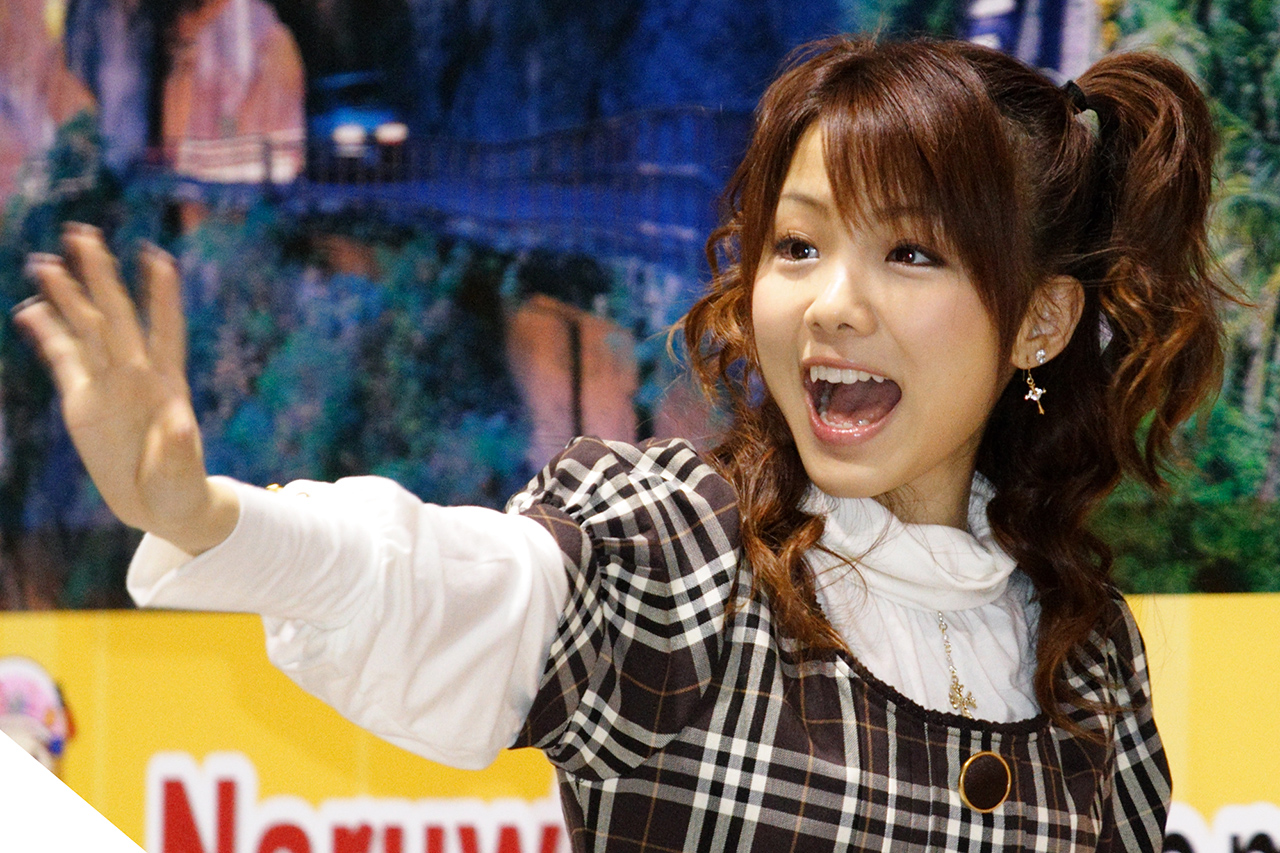
Reina Tanaka portrays Nina Machida

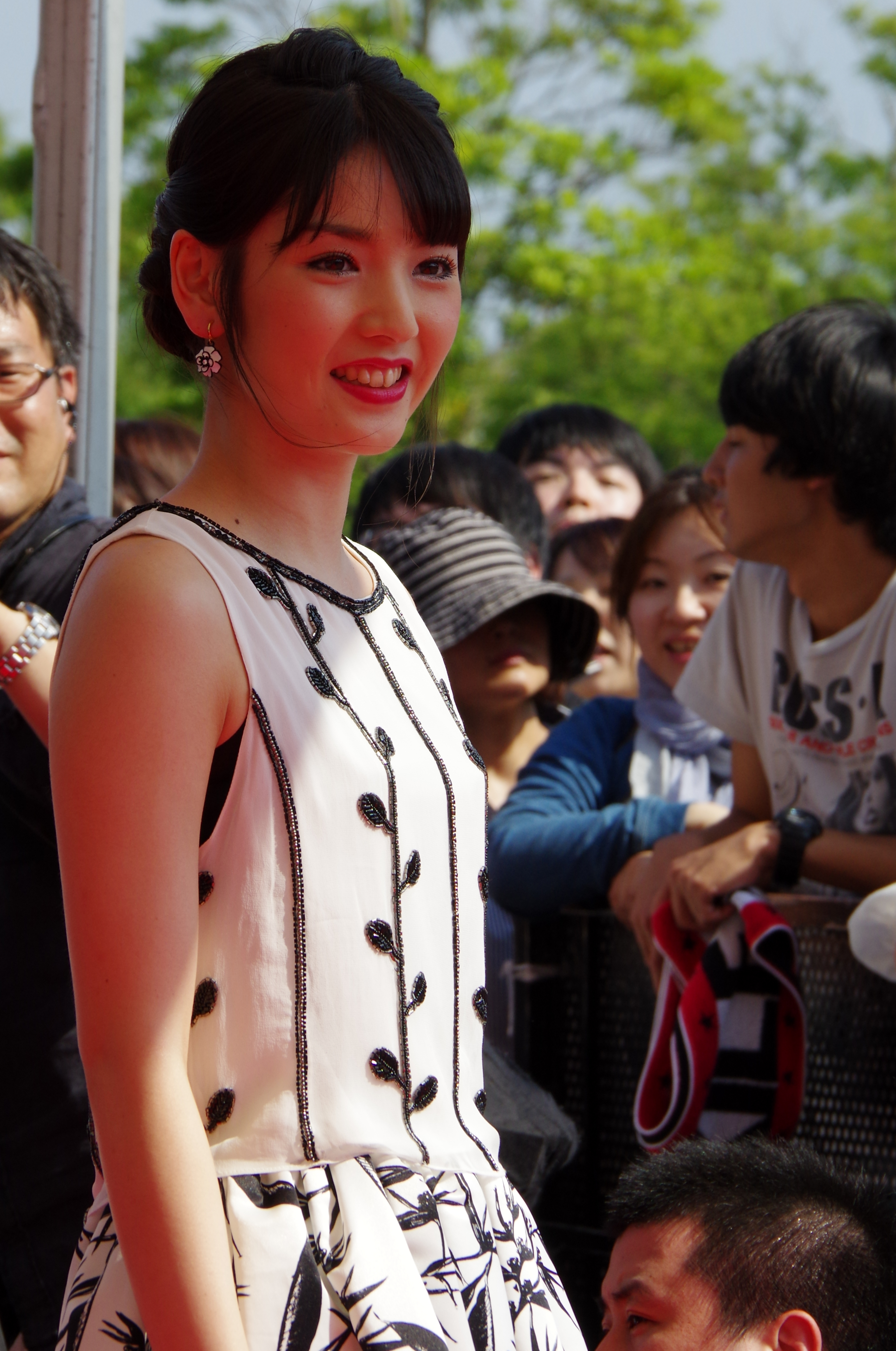
Sayumi Michishige portrays Sayuri Tachikawa

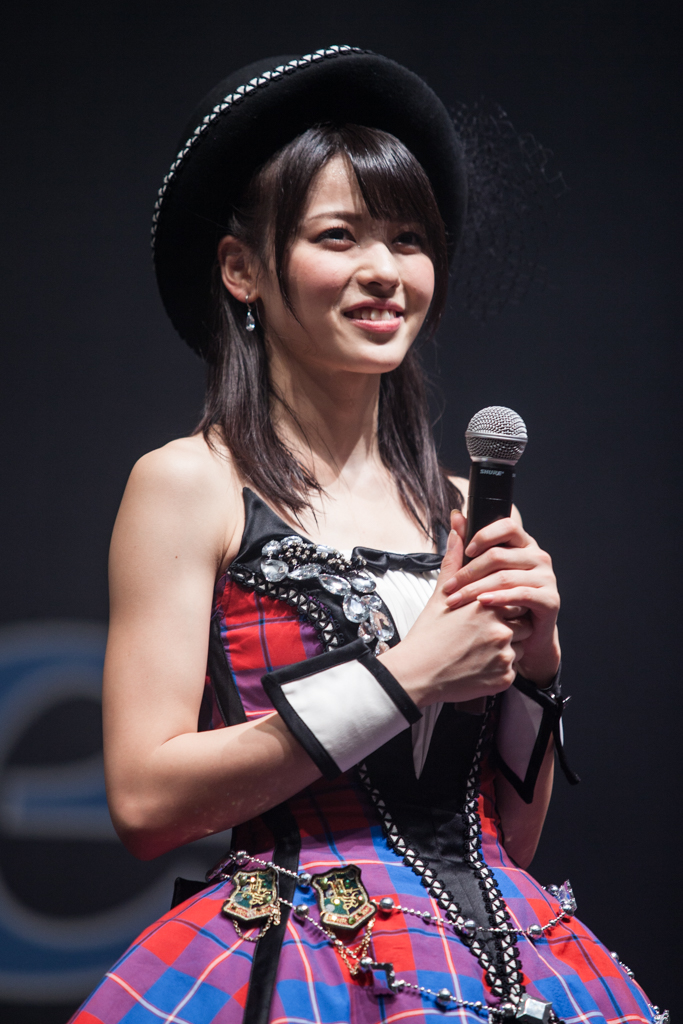
Maimi Yajima portrays Mami Shibuya

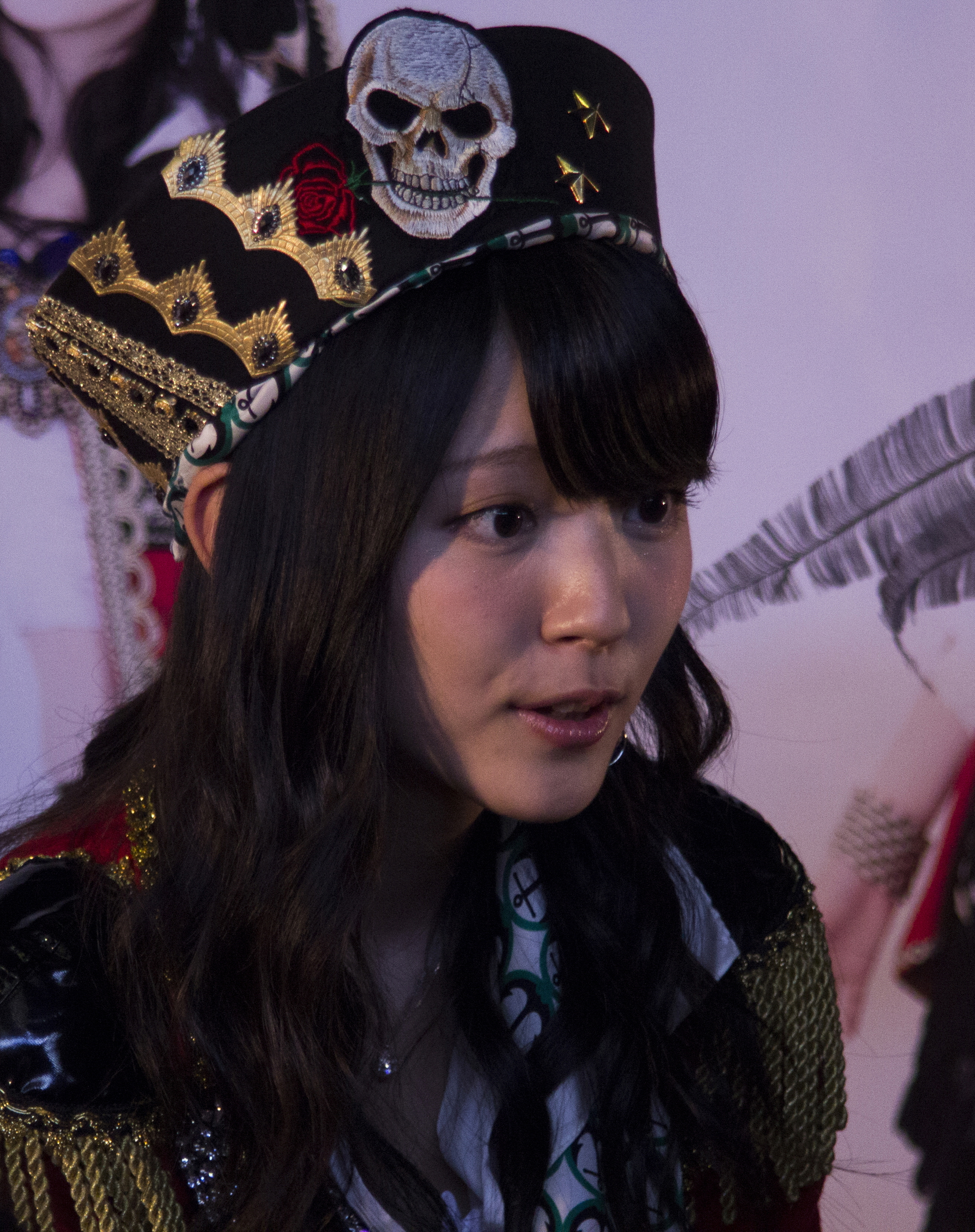
Airi Suzuki portrays Yuri Uehara

Class 2A

- Reina Tanaka as Nina Machida
- Sayumi Michishige as Sayuri Tachikawa
- Dori Sakurada as Kazuki Sato
- Maimi Yajima as Mami Shibuya
- Airi Suzuki as Yuri Uehara

Recurring

- Risa Niigaki as Nagisa Toriumi
- Riho Sayashi as Sana Nagata
- Maro Kannagi as Umi Yamashita
- Meimi Tamura as Riku Ogura
- Ayaka Wada as Sora Tengenji
- Suzunosuke as Mr. Muraki
- Akari Saho as Mina Hatsudai

Shibuya Keibitai

- Haruka Kudō as Noa Miyashita
- Masaki Sato as Rion Miyamasu
- Haruna Iikubo as Rin Utagawa
- Ayumi Ishida as Runa Jinnan

Kuishin Girls

- Maasa Sudo as Fuyumi Okubo
- Mizuki Fukumura as Haru Akasaka
- Erina Ikuta as Riko Nakano
- Kanon Suzuki as Mei Otsuka

Judgement Squad

- You Kikkawa as Iroha Aoyama
- Saki Shimizu as Miku Azabu
- Chinami Tokunaga as Takako Jinguu

Nina Faction

- Sayuki Takagi as Haru Maihama
- Kurumi Yoshihashi as Natsu Hakkeijima
- Nanami Tanabe as Aki Daiba

Eite Butai

- Saki Nakajima as Satoko Komaba
- Chisato Okai as Tomoko Mita
- Mai Hagiwara as Yuko Yotsuya

Devil Sisters

- Kei Yasuda as Akina Sugamo
- Kaori Iida as Seiko Akasuka

Others

- Momoko Tsugunaga as Tomoko Harajuku
- Tetsuya Makita as Tsutomi Imawaka
- Erina Mano as Reiko Shirogane
- Karin Miyamoto as Yu Meguro
- Rika Ishikawa as Kina Machida

== Episode Information ==
Episode	Subtitle	Viewership
Lesson #01	You saw my underwear! A battle breaks out	1.6
Lesson #02	A Theft Case! A beautiful woman arrested	1.7
Lesson #03	School Race with the Beauty with a Big Appetite	1.0
Lesson #04	Those who oppose Judgment Squad will dropout!	1.3
Lesson #05	A cute battle of seat changing	1.4
Lesson #06	The Battle for Beauty, Michishige VS Tsugunaga! Hello!Pro	1.6
Lesson #07	Tanaka, Michishige & S/mileage	1.5
Lesson #08	Battle against the Elite Butai	1.4
Lesson #09	A surprising first sight development	1.7
Lesson #10	The Transfer student is an Ojou-sama!?	2.7
Lesson #11	Appearance of the strongest enemy?	1.8
Lesson #12	The Final Decisive Battle!	2.1
Average Viewership (Kanto Area Only) = 1.7
