= Azusa Yamamoto =

Japanese Gravure idol, actress, and talent

- 山本 梓
- Born: April 24, 1981 (age 44); Funabashi, Chiba, Japan
- Occupations: Gravure idol; actress; tarento
- Height: 1.57 m (5 ft 2 in)
- Spouse: Yoshihiro Kajiwara (m. 2014)
- Children: 1
- Website: Tommy's Artist Company Profile

Azusa Yamamoto (山本 梓, Yamamoto Azusa) (born April 24, 1981) is a Japanese Gravure idol, actress, and talent. She was named as one of the "7 most irresistibly cute Japanese idols" by the Thailand version of FHM magazine in 2010. The magazine also dubbed her "the cutest villain ever" for her movie work in the "Hurricanger" series.

== Works ==
=== Films ===
- Ninpu Sentai Hurricanger Shushuuto The Movie (2002)-Furabijo
- Ninpu Sentai Hurricanger vs Gaoranger (2003)-Furabijo
- Bakuryuu sentai Abaranger vs Hurricaneger (2004)-Furabijo
- Tokusou Sentai Dekaranger The Movie: Full Blast Action (2004)-Student
- GoGo Sentai Boukenger vs. Super Sentai(2007)-Furabijo
- Ninpu Sentai Hurricanger: 10 Years After (2013)-Furabijo

=== Television series ===
- "Ninpu Sentai Hurricanger" (2002-2003)-Furabijo
- Detective Conan Case Closed episode 488. (She voiced Herself)

=== Album ===
- Azu★Tra~Urusei Yatsura Lum's Love Song~

== See also ==
- List of Japanese gravure idols
- List of Japanese actresses
- List of Japanese celebrities
