= Lovendor =

Japanese pop/rock band

- Origin: Tokyo, Japan
- Genres: J-pop; pop; rock; pop rock
- Years active: 2012–2019 (hiatus)
- Labels: Up-Front Works; Zetima (2015–2019)
- Members: Reina Tanaka
- Past members: Yuki Uozumi; Marina Okada; Marin Miyazawa
- Website: lovendor.jp

Lovendor (ラベンダー, Rabendā; stylized as LoVendoЯ) is a Japanese all-female band.

== History ==
The band was formed in 2012 around Morning Musume member Reina Tanaka. Originally there were four members: Reina Tanaka (vocals), Marina Okada (vocals), Yuki Uozumi (guitar), Marin Miyazawa (guitar).

In July 2016 it was announced that Yuki Uozumi was to leave the band on September 16.

On February 27, 2019, it was announced that Marina Okada would graduate from the band at the end of March and that her contract with Upfront Create would also be terminated.

Following the graduation of Okada, in June 2019 it was announced that Lovendor would be going on hiatus and that Miyazawa's contract would be expiring in July.

== Members ==
- Reina Tanaka (田中 れいな) — vocals (leader)

=== Former members ===
- Yuki Uozumi (魚住 有希) — guitar (left on September 16, 2016)
- Marina Okada (岡田 万里奈) — vocals (left at the end of March 2019)
- Marin Miyazawa (宮澤 茉凛) — guitar (left at end of July 2019)

== Discography ==
=== Mini-albums ===
Title	Album details	Charts	
Title	Album details	JPN Oricon CD	JPN Oricon DVD
Lovendor Cover the Rock (ラベンダーカバー The ROCK)	Cover mini-album; Released: 22 May 2013; Label: Up-Front Works; Formats: CD	67	—N/a
Bukiyō (不器用)	DVD mini-album; Released: 23 April 2014; Label: Up-Front Works; Formats: CD+DVD	—N/a	29
Ikujinashi (イクジナシ)	Mini-album; Released: 5 November 2014; Label: Up-Front Works; Formats: CD (+ bonus DVD)	41	—N/a
Яe:Start (リスタート)	Mini-album; Released: 6 September 2017; Label: Up-Front Works; Formats: CD (+ bonus DVD)	33	—N/a
N/A denotes items ineligible for the chart, due to a lack of either a CD or a DVD release in Japan.

=== Singles ===
No.	Title	Release date	Charts
No.	Title	Release date	JPN Oricon
1	"Ii n' ja Nai? / Futsū no Watashi Ganbare!" (いいんじゃない？／普通の私 ガンバレ！)	July 1, 2015	7
2	"Takaramono / Itsuwari" (宝物／イツワリ)	February 24, 2016	13

=== Video Albums ===
Title	Album details	Peak chart positions	
Title	Album details	JPN	
Title	Album details	DVD	Blu-ray
LoVendoЯ Archives 2013	Released: December 6, 2013; Label: Up-Front Indies; Formats: DVD	—	—
M-line club Live Event at STB139 ~Hinamatsuri ni Kansha wo Komete~ (M-line clubライブイベント2014年3月at STB139～ひな祭りに感謝を込めて～)	Collaboration with Yuko Nakazawa, Kaori Iida, Kei Yasuda, Rika Ishikawa, Hitomi Yoshizawa, Ai Takahashi, Makoto Ogawa; Released: April 28, 2014 (JPN); Label: Up-Front International; Formats: DVD	—	—
M-line Memory Vol.17	Collaboration with Rika Ishikawa; Released: April 27, 2015 (JPN); Label: Up-Front International; Formats: DVD	—	—
LoVendoЯ LIVE 2016 ~CHALLENGEЯ!~	Released: January 18, 2017 (JPN); Label: Up-Front Indies; Formats: DVD	—	—
