= Masaki Satō =

Japanese singer, dancer and actress

Masaki Satō 佐藤優樹
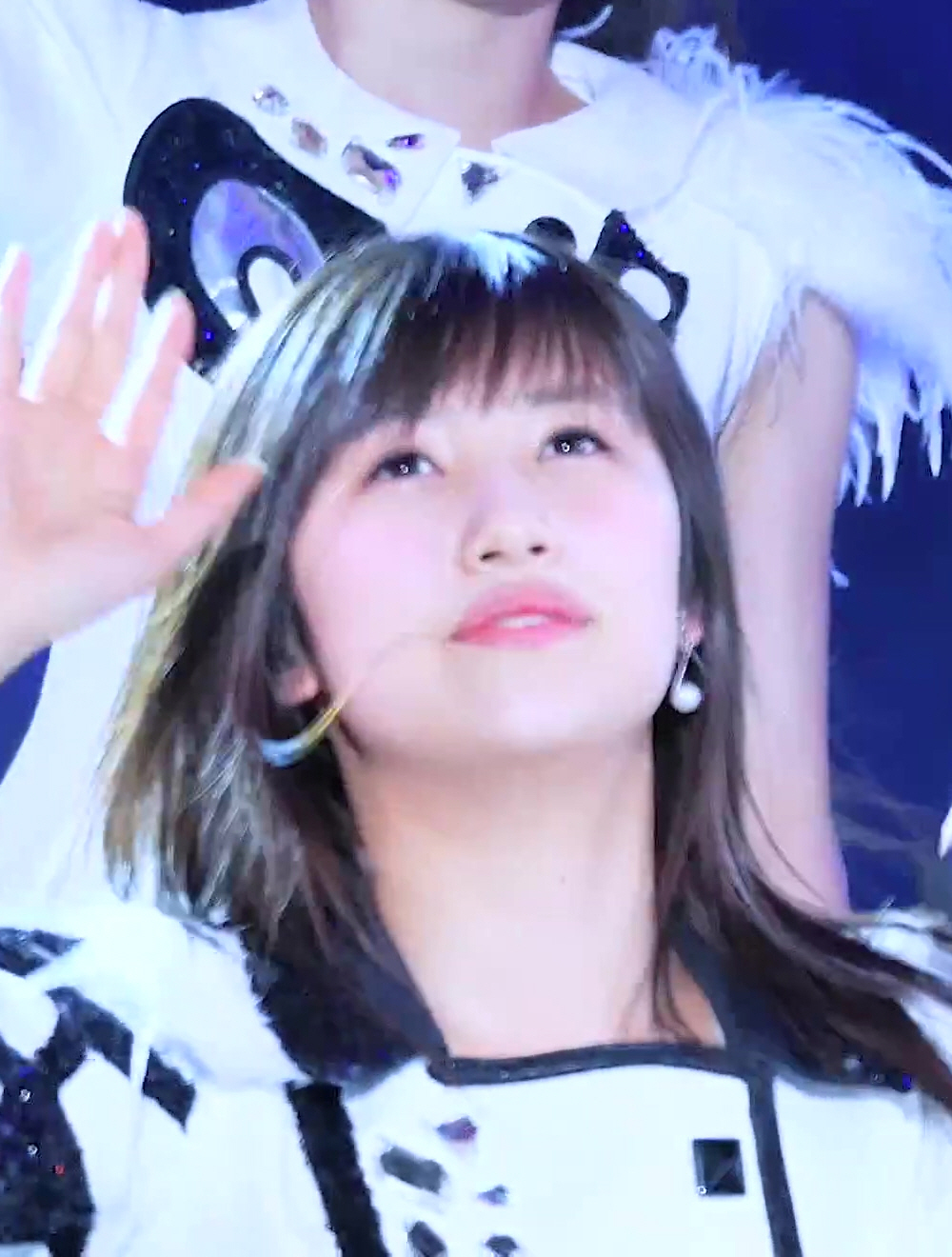

Background information
- Born: May 7, 1999 (age 27); Hokkaido, Japan
- Occupations: Singer; Model; Dancer; actor
- Musical career
- Genres: Japanese pop
- Instrument: Vocals
- Years active: 2011–present
- Label: Zetima
- Formerly of: Morning Musume

Masaki Satō (佐藤優樹, Satō Masaki) (born May 7, 1999, in Sapporo, Hokkaido) is a Japanese pop singer. She is a former tenth-generation member of the pop group Morning Musume.

== Early life ==
Masaki Satō was born on May 7, 1999, in Hokkaido, Japan.

== Career ==
=== 2011–present: Debut with Morning Musume ===
On September 29, 2011, at a concert at Nippon Budokan, which was part of Morning Musume Concert Tour 2011 Aki Ai Believe: Takahashi Ai Sotsugyō Kinen Special, it was announced that Masaki Satō passed the auditions alongside three other girls: Haruna Īkubo, Ayumi Ishida and Haruka Kudō, and would join Morning Musume.

On October 10, 2012, it was announced that Satō would be a member of the new unit, Harvest, alongside Erina Ikuta, Ayumi Ishida and Akari Takeuchi.

On July 23, 2013, it was announced that Satō would be a member of the new unit, Jurin, alongside Juice=Juice member Karin Miyamoto.

On March 13, 2014, it was announced that Satō would be a member of a newly formed Satoyama movement unit, Sato no Akari, alongside Rina Katsuta, and Akari Uemura.

She graduated from Morning Musume on December 13, 2021, to become a soloist.

== Discography ==
For Masaki Satō's releases with Morning Musume, see Morning Musume discography.

=== Singles ===
No.	Title	Year	Peak chart positions		Sales	Album
No.	Title	Year	JPN Oricon	JPN Hot 100 (Note: Sources for chart positions are as follows: "Miss Henkan! !", "Egao no Kimi wa Taiyou sa", "Ding Dong", "Arashi no Number".)	Sales	Album
Digital 1	"Miss Henkan! !" (Miss変換! !) (with Haruka Kudo)	2017	—	82		Non-album singles
Digital 2	"Egao no Kimi wa Taiyō sa" (笑顔の君は太陽さ)	2021	—	36		Non-album singles
Digital 3	"Summer Night Town" (サマーナイトタウン) (with Reina Tanaka)	2022	—	—		Non-album singles
Digital 4	"Hotarumatsuri no Hi" (ほたる祭りの日) (with Karin Miyamoto)	2022	—	— (Note: Charted at number 49 on the Download Songs chart .)		Non-album singles
1	"Ding Dong"	2023	4	42	JPN: 16,165	Non-album singles
1	"Romantic Nante Gara ja Nai" (ロマンティックなんてガラじゃない)	2023	4	—	JPN: 16,165	Non-album singles
2	"Arashi no Number" (嵐のナンバー)	2024	3	92	JPN: 12,851	Non-album singles
2	"Kachō Fūgetsu Shunka Shūtō" (花鳥風月 春夏秋冬)	2024	3	—	JPN: 12,851	Non-album singles

== Bibliography ==
=== Photobooks ===
- Sankaku no Glass (三角の硝子) (October 6, 2018, Odyssey Books and Wani Books, ISBN 978-4-8470-8156-9)

== Filmography ==
=== Television ===
- Sūgaku Joshi Gakuen (数学♥女子学園) (NTV, 2012)
