= Riho Sayashi =

Japanese actress, singer and dancer (born 1998)

- 鞘師里保
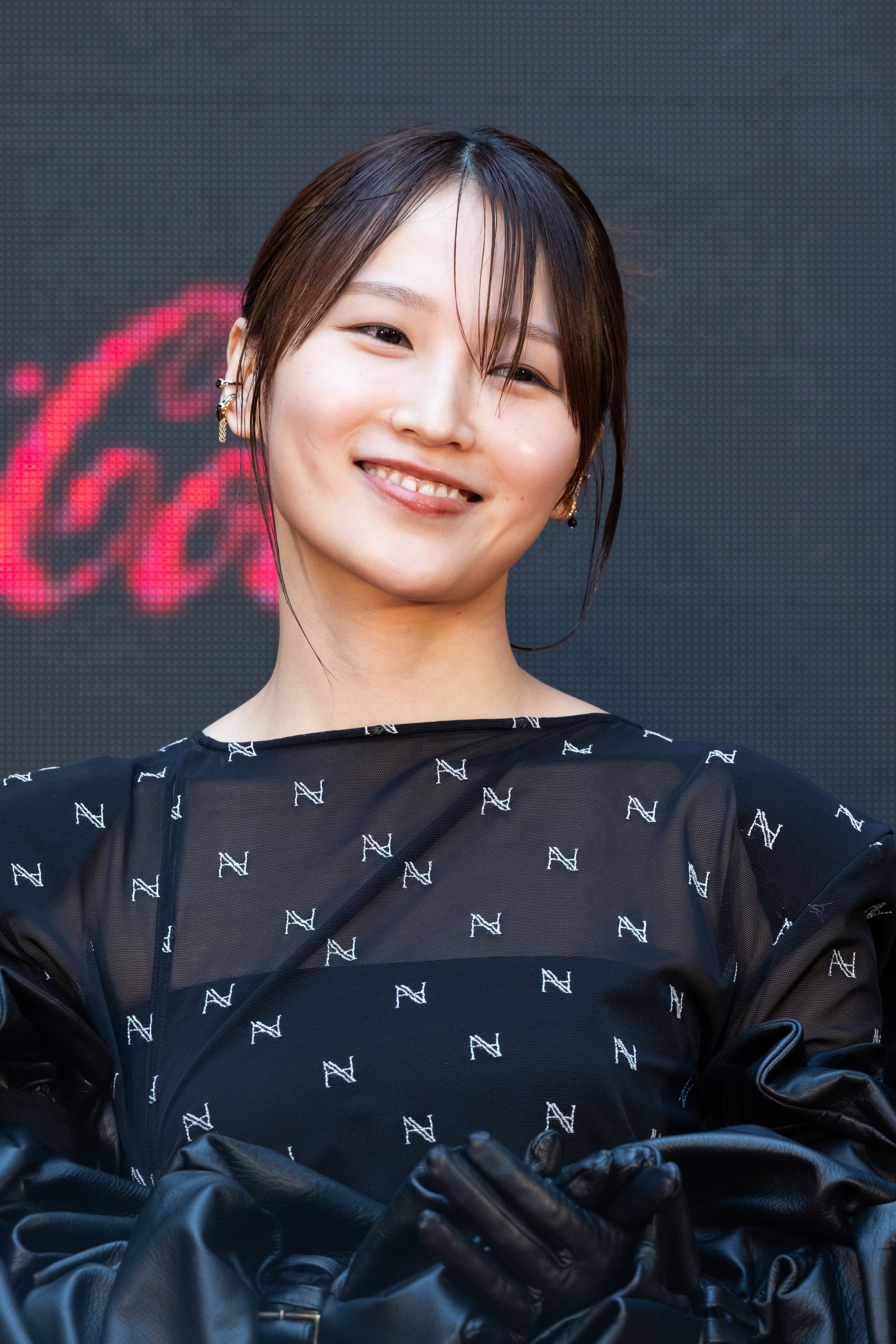
- Sayashi at the 37th Tokyo International Film Festival in 2024
- Born: May 28, 1998 (age 28); Hiroshima Prefecture, Japan
- Occupations: Singer; actress; dancer
- Agent: Up-Front Promotion (2011–2018); Japan Music Entertainment (2020–present)
- Musical career
- Genre: J-pop
- Years active: 2011–present
- Formerly of: Morning Musume; Babymetal (touring member)
- Website: Official website

Riho Sayashi (Japanese: 鞘師里保, Hepburn: Sayashi Riho; born May 28, 1998) is a Japanese actress, singer and dancer. She is a former member of the Japanese pop group Morning Musume. In 2019, she was a touring member of Babymetal, including in their performance at Glastonbury Festival 2019.

== Career ==
Prior to joining Morning Musume, Sayashi was a student of Actor's School Hiroshima (ASH), which graduates include Suzuka Nakamoto, Himeka Nakamoto, members of Perfume, and Ruru Dambara.

=== 2010: Early career ===
Sayashi was one of the winners of the Jc&Jk actress audition and got a chance to perform in Morning Musume's Fashionable stage play.

=== 2011–2015: Morning Musume ===
Sayashi passed Morning Musume's ninth generation auditions, along with Erina Ikuta, Kanon Suzuki, and former Hello! Pro Egg member Mizuki Fukumura. The ninth generation members debuted in Morning Musume January 2, at the Hello! Project 2011 Winter ~Kangei Shinsen Matsuri~ concert. Sayashi's first single with Morning Musume is titled "Maji Desu ka Ska!".

On March 27, 2011, it was announced Sayashi would be replacing Erina Mano for the radio show Mano Deli, renaming it Riho Deli. Sayashi was the only ninth generation member to receive solo lines in "Only You". On July 29, 2011, Sayashi was out of events for a few weeks to rest due to ischium nerve pain on her right side.

In July 2012, it was announced that Sayashi will be part of the new Hello! Project duo Peaberry, along with S/mileage's Ayaka Wada, and that they would perform their original song "Cabbage Hakusho" at the Hello! Project summer concerts. They were formed alongside the group DIY♡ to be part of Hello! Satoyama Life.

On October 29, 2015, it was announced that Sayashi will graduate from Morning Musume '15 on December 31, 2015, during the annual Hello! Project Countdown Live. On December 29, 2015, Morning Musume '15 released their 60th single; this was the last Morning Musume single to feature Sayashi.

On December 31, 2015, Sayashi graduated from Morning Musume and became an artist under Hello! Project.

=== 2016–2018: Studying abroad ===
After leaving Morning Musume, Sayashi went to New York and other places abroad for about two years to study dancing and English.

On December 7, 2018, it was that announced her contract with Up-Front Promotion had ended and she subsequently graduated from Hello! Project at the end of November 2018.

=== 2019: Morning Musume reunion, touring with Babymetal ===
After a 3-year and 3-month hiatus, Sayashi re-appeared to the public at Hello! Project 20th Anniversary!! Hello! Project Hina Fes 2019 on March 30. She made a guest appearance at the event and performed with several current and former Morning Musume members.

On June 28, Sayashi appeared as a support dancer, or "Avenger", for the kawaii metal band Babymetal on the "Babymetal Awakens -The Sun Also Rises-" concert in Yokohama Arena. Two days later on June 30, she also appeared with them at the Glastonbury Festival in the same capacity, as they became the first Japanese band to perform on a main stage at the festival.

=== 2020–present: Solo career ===
On May 1, 2020, Sayashi started an Instagram account, where she posts in Japanese and English.

Since July 10, Sayashi has her own column called RihoColumn (りほこら(む)) in the online magazine NewsCrunch, published by Wani Books.

On September 3, Sayashi announced she had signed to Japan Music Entertainment as a solo artist.

On July 14, 2021, Sayashi's staff announced the sale of her first EP, named Daybreak, which was released at August 4, under her newly established label "Savo-r", and also held a one-man live tour titled "Riho Sayashi 1st Live 2021 Daybreak" at Toyosu Pit, Tokyo Team Smile. This album was her first newly made material after five and half years, after her graduation from Morning Musume in 2015. Sayashi wrote the lyrics for all the songs on the album, and worked together with several composers.

Sayashi choreographed the AKB48 song "Donchō o Agetekure!" (緞帳を上げてくれ！), first performed at the AKB48 Theater in Akihabara on December 8, 2024.

== Personal life ==
Sayashi's paternal uncle, Tomoya Sayashi, formerly played for the Hiroshima Toyo Carp baseball team.

== Hello! Project groups and units ==
- Morning Musume (2011–2015)
- Hello! Project Mobekimasu (2011)
- Peaberry (2012–2015)

== Discography ==
=== Solo career ===
==== Albums ====
- Symbolized (July 24, 2024)

==== EPs ====
Title	Release date	Top position	Publisher/Notes
Title	Release date	Oricon Weekly Chart	Publisher/Notes
Daybreak	August 4, 2021	21	Savo-r
Reflection	January 12, 2022	18	Savo-r
Unison	November 16, 2022	19	Savo-r
Too Much!	July 23, 2025	—	Avex
Own	September 2, 2026	—	Avex

==== DVDs ====
Title	Release date	Top position	Publisher/Notes
Title	Release date	Oricon Weekly DVD Chart	Publisher/Notes
Sayashi Riho ~Greeting~ (さやし りほ～Ｇreeｔiｎg～)	August 31, 2011	51	Zetima
Riho	January 20, 2012	—	e-Hello! series
Hyahhoi (ひゃっっほ～い♪( 'θ')ノ, Hyahhhōi)	September 26, 2012	68	Zetima
Snowdrop (snowdrop)	March 28, 2013	—	e-Hello! series
Riho's Fashion Archive	March 12, 2014	32	Zetima

==== Blu-rays ====
Title	Release date	Top position	Publisher/Notes
Title	Release date	Oricon Weekly Blu-ray Chart	Publisher/Notes
sixteen	April 8, 2015	27	Zetima

== Bibliography ==
=== Photobooks ===
1. Sayashi Riho (さやしりほ) (August 27, 2011, Wani Books, ISBN 978-4-8470-4391-8)
2. Un Deux Trois (アンドゥトゥア) (August 27, 2012, Wani Books, ISBN 978-4-8470-4486-1)
3. Taiyou (太陽) (November 25, 2013, Wani Books, ISBN 978-4-8470-4595-0)
4. Juurokusai (十六歳) (March 25, 2015, Wani Books, ISBN 978-4-8470-4742-8)

== Appearances ==
=== Film ===
- Share House (2011)
- 11 Rebels (2024), Natsu

=== Drama ===
- Sūgaku Joshi Gakuen (数学♥女子学園) (2012)
- Don't Stop My Beautification, Masumi Haraguchi (2023)
- Mentsuyu Hitori Meshi (めんつゆひとり飯), Tsuyu Mendō (2023)
- Oshi o Meshiagare (推しを召し上がれ), Yuzu Hodaishi (2023)
- Mentsuyu Hitori Meshi 2 (めんつゆひとり飯2), Tsuyu Mendō (2024)

=== Variety and talk shows ===
- Bijo Gaku (美女学) (2011)
- Hello Pro! Time (ハロプロ！Time) (April 2011 – May 2012)
- Hello! Satoyama Life (ハロー!SATOYAMAライフ) (June 2012 – 2014)
- NHK High School Course, English Communication I host (2022)

=== Theater ===
- Fashionable (ファッショナブル) (2010)
- Reborn: Inochi no Audition (リボーン～命のオーディション～) (2011)
- Lilium: Girls' Purity Musical (2014)
- Death Note: The Musical, Misa Amane (2025)

=== Radio ===
- Riho Deli (2011–2015)

=== Internet ===
- UstreaMusume (2011–201(?))
