= Haruka Kudō (singer) =

Japanese actress (born 1999)

Haruka Kudō 工藤遥
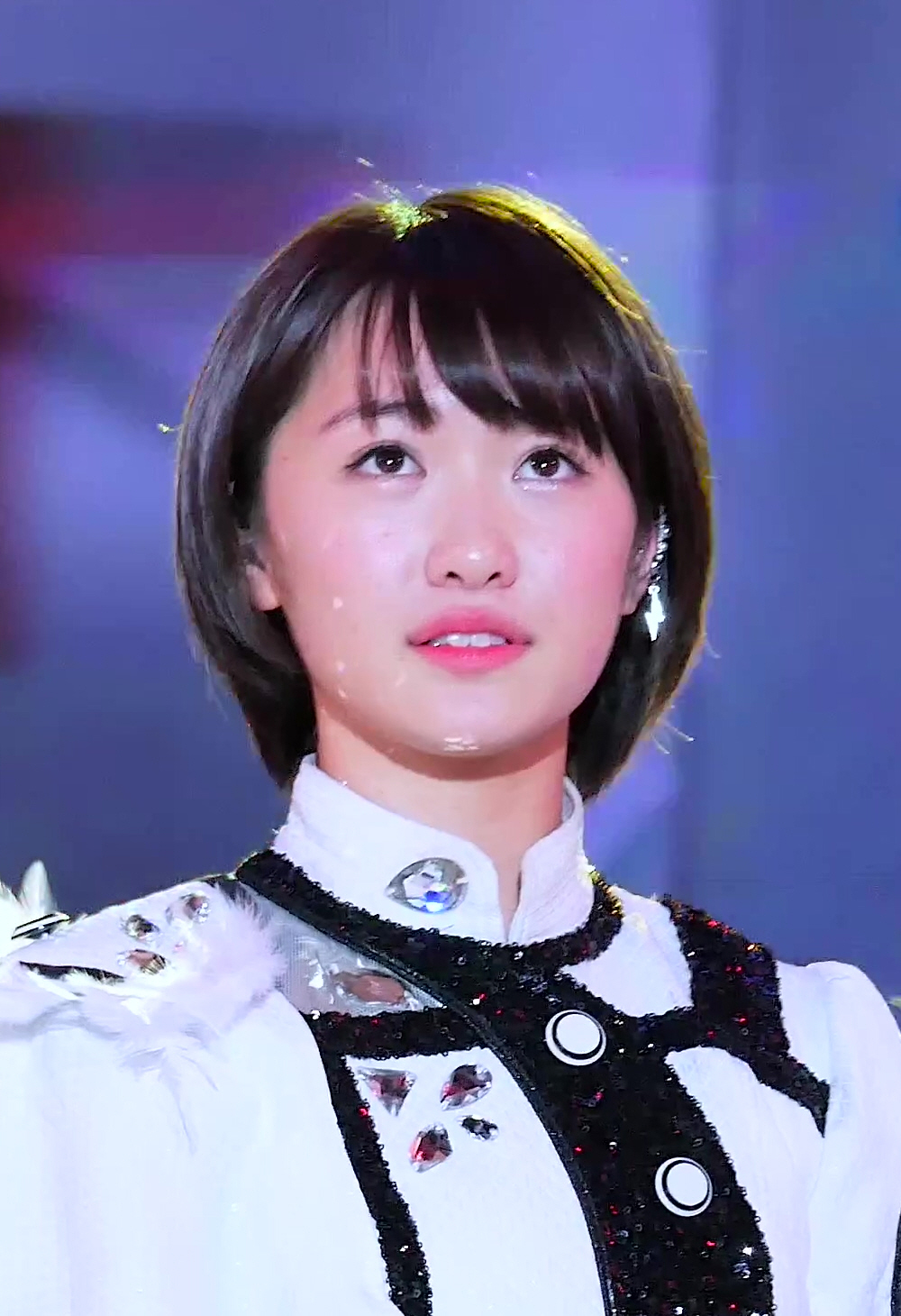
- Kudo in 2016

Background information
- Born: October 27, 1999 (age 26); Saitama Prefecture, Japan
- Genres: J-pop
- Occupations: Singer; Actress; Dancer
- Years active: 2010–present
- Labels: Zetima (2010–2025); GATE Inc. (2025-)
- Spinoffs: Hello! Pro Egg; Morning Musume; Hello! Project Mobekimasu

Haruka Kudō (工藤遥, Kudō Haruka; born October 27, 1999) is a Japanese actress and former pop singer. She is a former member of the pop group Morning Musume. Prior to joining Morning Musume, Kudō was a Hello! Pro Egg member. Kudō is the youngest member in history to join Morning Musume, at 11 years and 11 months old, surpassing Ai Kago's 12-year record. She is also known for playing the role of Umika Hayami/Lupin Yellow in the tokusatsu series Kaitou Sentai Lupinranger VS Keisatsu Sentai Patranger.

== Biography ==
=== Early life ===
Kudō was born on October 27, 1999, in Saitama Prefecture, Japan.

=== 2010–2011: Debut in Morning Musume ===
On March 27, 2010, at the 2010 Hello! Project Shinjin Kōen sangatsu: Yokohama Gold! concert, Kudō was introduced as a new member of Hello! Pro Egg. She debuted in concert on May 1, 2010, at the Hello! Project presents: Hello Fest in Odaiba Gurume Park festival.

On September 29, 2011, at a concert at Nippon Budokan, which was part of Morning Musume Concert Tour 2011 Aki Ai Believe: Takahashi Ai Sotsugyō Kinen Special, it was announced that Kudō had passed the auditions alongside three other girls: Haruna Iikubo, Ayumi Ishida and Masaki Satō, and would be joining Morning Musume.

=== 2017–2025: Departure from Morning Musume and acting debut ===
On April 29, 2017, Kudō announced her upcoming departure from Morning Musume and Hello! Project. On December 11, at the Morning Musume Autumn concert tour Kudō graduated from the group. In February 2018, Kudō made her acting debut in Kaitou Sentai Lupinranger VS Keisatsu Sentai Patranger as Lupin Yellow.

On March 31, she retired from Zetima and became freelance.

=== 2025-present: Joined with GATE inc. ===
On December 11, she joined the talent agency GATE Inc. and opened a fanclub “HARU FREAK”.

== Discography ==
For Haruka Kudō's releases with Morning Musume, see Morning Musume discography.

=== Singles ===
Title	Year	Peak chart positions		Album
Title	Year	JPN Oricon	JPN Hot 100 (Note: Sources for chart positions are as follows: "Miss Henkan! !")	Album
Miss Henkan! ! (Miss変換! !) (with Masaki Sato)	2017	—	82	Non-album single

== Bibliography ==
=== Books ===
1. Haruka (April 27, 2019, Wani Books, ISBN 978-4-88660-139-1)

=== Photobooks ===
1. Do (October 27, 2012, Wani Books, ISBN 978-4847045035)
2. Ashita Tenki ni Naare! (あした天気になーれ！) (September 27, 2014, Wani Books, ISBN 978-4-8470-4686-5)
3. Harukaze (ハルカゼ) (February 27, 2016, Wani Books, ISBN 978-4-8470-4822-7)
4. Kudo Haruka (October 27, 2017, Wani Books, ISBN 978-4-8470-4961-3)
5. Haru Camera (ハルカメラ) (April 11, 2018, Wani Books, ISBN 978-4-8470-8112-5)
6. Lively (March 27, 2020, Wani Books, ISBN 978-4-8470-8276-4)

== Filmography ==
=== DVDs and Blu-rays ===
Title	Album details	Peak chart positions	
Title	Album details	JPN	
Title	Album details	DVD	Blu-ray
Haruka	Released: November 7, 2012; Label: Zetima; Formats: DVD	30	—
Simple	Released: October 22, 2014; Label: Zetima; Formats: DVD	59	—
Harunatsu -Haruka- (春夏 -Haruka-)	Released: July 6, 2016; Label: Zetima; Formats: DVD	44	—
Do The Vacation	Released: November 22, 2017; Label: Zetima; Formats: Blu-ray	—	58

=== Television ===
- Sūgaku Joshi Gakuen (数学♥女子学園) (2012)
- Otona e Novel (オトナヘノベル) (2015)
- Kaitou Sentai Lupinranger VS Keisatsu Sentai Patranger (快盗戦隊ルパンジャーVS警察戦隊パトレンジャー) (2018–2019)
- Toshishita Kareshi (2020)
- Iryusosa (2021)
- Kamen Rider Geats (2023) Eps 45
- The Child of God Murmurs (2023)

=== Movies ===
- Kaitou Sentai Lupinranger VS Keisatsu Sentai Patranger en Film (2018), Umika Hayami/Lupin Yellow
- Lupinranger VS Patranger VS Kyuranger (2019), Umika Hayami/Lupin Yellow
- Kishiryu Sentai Ryusoulger VS Lupinranger VS Patranger the Movie (2020), Umika Hayami/Lupin Yellow
- Kotera-san Climbs! (2020)
- 461 Days of Bento: A Promise Between Father and Son (2020)
- Angry Rice Wives (2021)
- Suicide Forest Village (2021)
- Two Outs Bases Loaded (2022), Saki
- Kamen Rider Geats the Movie: 4 Aces and the Black Fox (2023), Melo
- Dreaming in Between (2023), Yuma Suenaga
- Insomniacs After School (2023), Haya Magari
- Catching the Stars of This Summer (2025), Riku's sister
- Grim Reaper Barber (2026)

=== Theater ===
- Ima ga Itsuka ni Naru Mae ni (今がいつかになる前に) (2010)
- Reborn ~Inochi no Audition~ (リボーン～命のオーディション～) (2011)
- 1974 (Ikunayo) (1974(イクナヨ)) (2011)
- Stacies Shoujo Saisatsu Kageki (ステーシーズ 少女再殺歌劇) (2012)
- Gogakuyuu (ごがくゆう) (2013)
- Lilium -Lilium Shoujo Junketsu Kageki (-Lilium －リリウム 少女純潔歌劇－) (2014)
- Triangle (トライアングル) (2015)
- Zoku 11nin Iru! Higashi no Chihei, Nishi no Towa (続・11人いる！東の地平・西の永遠) (2016)
- JK Ninja Girls (JKニンジャガールズ) (2017)
- Pharaoh no Haka (ファラオの墓) (2017)
- Itsumo Pocket ni Chopin (いつもポケットにショパン) (2019)
- Mahō Tsukai no Yome (魔法使いの嫁) (2019–2020)

== Awards ==
Year	Award	Category	Nominated work	Result	Ref
2021	75th Mainichi Film Awards	Best New Actress	Kotera-san Climbs!	Nominated	
