= Erina Ikuta =

Japanese pop singer (born 1997)

Erina Ikuta 生田 衣梨奈
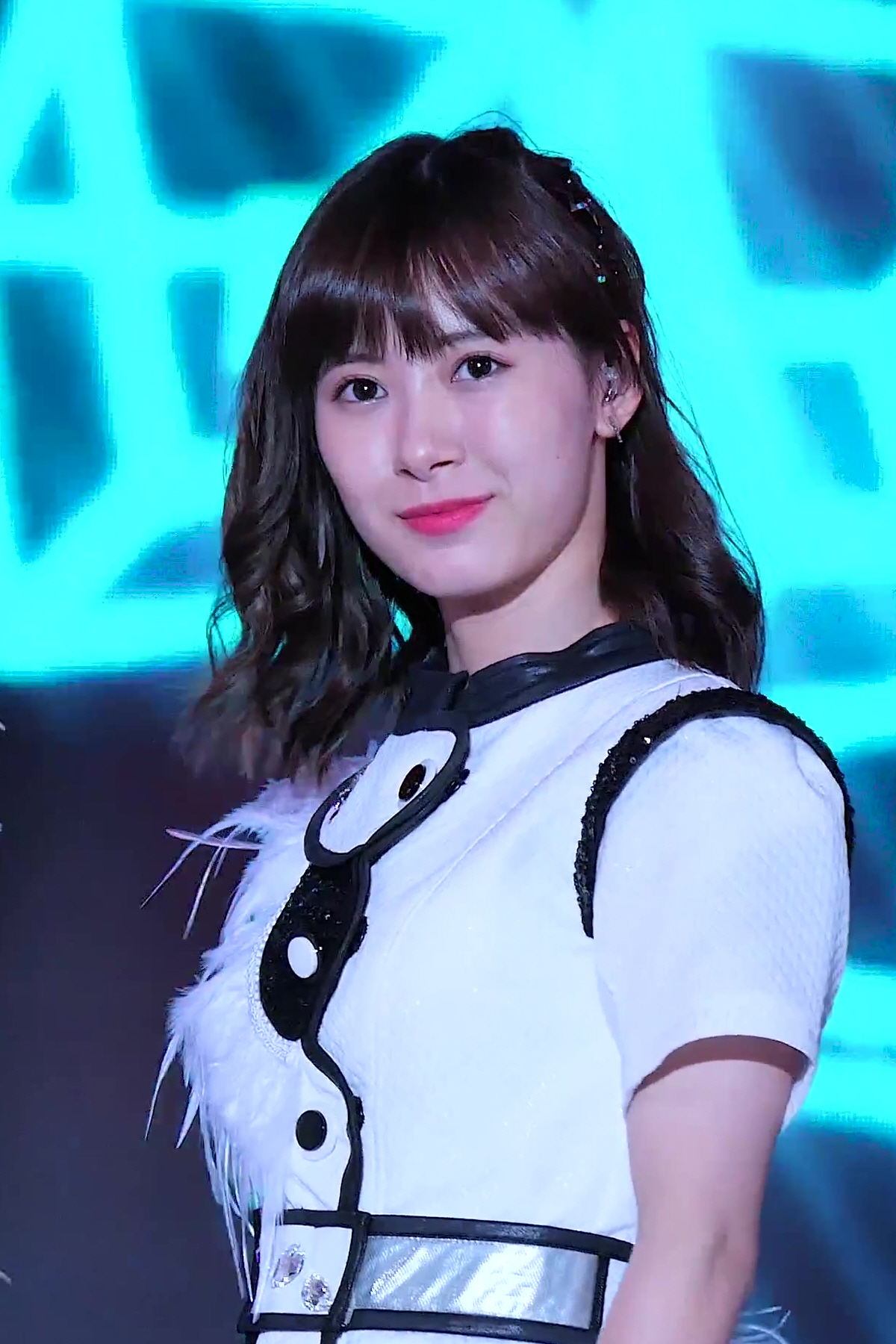
- Ikuta in 2016

Background information
- Also known as: Eripon (えりぽん)
- Born: 7 July 1997 (age 29); Fukuoka, Japan
- Genres: J-pop
- Occupations: Singer; dancer; actress; model
- Years active: 2011–present
- Labels: Zetima (2011-2025); Yoshimoto Kogyo (2026-)
- Formerly of: {{hlist Morning Musume|Hello! Project}}

Erina Ikuta (生田 衣梨奈, Ikuta Erina; born 7 July 1997) is a Japanese pop singer, dancer, actress and former model. She is a former ninth generation member of J-pop group Morning Musume. She joined Morning Musume in 2011 along with Riho Sayashi, Kanon Suzuki and Mizuki Fukumura. On 26 November 2014, she became Sub-Leader of Morning Musume along with member Haruna Ikubo and later on with Ayumi Ishida. On 30 November 2023, She became the new Leader of Morning Musume and Hello! Project after Mizuki Fukumura graduated from Morning Musume and Hello! Project. On January 2 2025, Erina Ikuta announced at the opening concert of the Hello! Project 2025 Winter Fes. tour that she will be graduating from Morning Musume '25 and Hello! Project following the group's upcoming spring concert tour. On the same day, she became the first member to have reached a tenure of 14 years in the group. She also said she intends to go solo after her graduation. On July 8 2025, Erina Ikuta graduated at the Morning Musume '25 Concert Tour Haru Mighty Magic DX ~Ikuta Erina wo Miokutte~.

== Biography ==
=== History ===
Before Ikuta joined Hello! Project, she was a fashion model with Elegant Promotion, and had a blog where she posted photos of what she was doing and outfits she wore. Ikuta was selected from Morning Musume's ninth generation "Kyūki Audition" to join the group on 2 January 2011, with Riho Sayashi, Kanon Suzuki, and Mizuki Fukumura. The new generation was officially revealed at the Hello! Project 2011 Winter: Kangei Shinsen Matsuri concert. She made her official debut on Morning Musume's 45th single "Maji Desu ka Ska!", released 6 April 2011.

In August 2011, she replaced the graduated Saki Ogawa of S/mileage on the children's morning program Oha Suta as an Oha Girl. On 27 March 2012, she and Oha Girl Maple have graduated from the show. On 18 April 2012, it was announced that Reina Tanaka and Morning Musume's 9th & 10th Generation members would star in a new stage play titled Stacey’s Shoujo Saisatsu Kageki, scheduled to run from 6–12 June 2012.

== Hello! Project groups and units ==
- Morning Musume (2011–2025)
- Hello! Project Mobekimasu (2011–2012)
- Harvest (2012–2025)
- Hello! Project MobekisuJ (2013–2025)
- HI-FIN (2013–2025)

== Discography ==
for Erina Ikuta's releases with Morning Musume, see Morning Musume discography.

== Filmography ==
=== DVDs ===
#	Title	Release date	Top position	Publisher/Notes
#	Title	Release date	Oricon Weekly DVD Chart	Publisher/Notes
1	Greeting ~Ikuta Erina~ (Greeting 〜生田 衣梨奈〜)	August 12, 2011	—	e-Hello! series
2	It’s a lovely day	October 24, 2014	—	e-Hello! series

Photobooks

- [2016.10.22] Erina (衣梨奈)
- [2018.01.20] if

Films

- 2011: Sharehouse (シェアハウス)

Dramas

- 2012: Suugaku♥Joshi Gakuen (数学♥女子学園)
- 2017: Konnichiwa, Joyuu no Sagara Itsuki Desu. (こんにちは、女優の相楽樹です。)

TV Programs

- 2011: Bijo Gaku (美女学)
- 2011: Hello Pro! Time (ハロプロ！Time)
- 2011–2012: Oha Suta (as an Oha Girl in the unit Oha Girl Maple)
- 2012–2013: Hello! SATOYAMA Life (ハロー! SATOYAMA ライフ)
- 2014- : The Girls Live
- 2015: Karada wo Ugokasu TV (体を動かすTV)
- 2018– : Ikuta Erina no VS Golf (生田衣梨奈のVSゴルフ)

Internet

- 2011: UstreaMusume
- 2011: Michishige Sayumi no "Mobekimasutte Nani??" (道重さゆみの『モベキマスってなに？？』)
- 2011: IkuMatsuri (生祭り) (special one-day Ustream)
- 2012–2013: Morning Musume 9ki・10ki Member WEB Talk Maji DE Pyoko! (モーニング娘。9・10期メンバー WEBトーク 本気DE飛跳！) (fanclub exclusive)
- 2013– : Hello! Project Station (ハロ！ステ)
- 2016– : Upcoming

=== Theater ===
- 17 August 2011: Reborn: Inochi no Audition (リボーン～命のオーディション～)
- 12 June 2012: Stacy's Shoujo Saisatsu Kageki (ステーシーズ 少女再殺歌劇)
- 18 June 2015: TRIANGLE (TRIANGLE -トライアングル-) (VTR role)
- 11 June 2016: Zoku 11nin Iru! Higashi no Chihei, Nishi no Towa (続・11人いる！東の地平・西の永遠)
- 2 June 2017: Pharaoh no Haka (ファラオの墓)
- 1 June 2018: Pharaoh no Haka ~Hebi Ou Sneferu~ (ファラオの墓～蛇王・スネフェル～)
