= Haruna Iikubo =

Japanese actress and singer (born 1994)

Haruna Iikubo 飯窪春菜
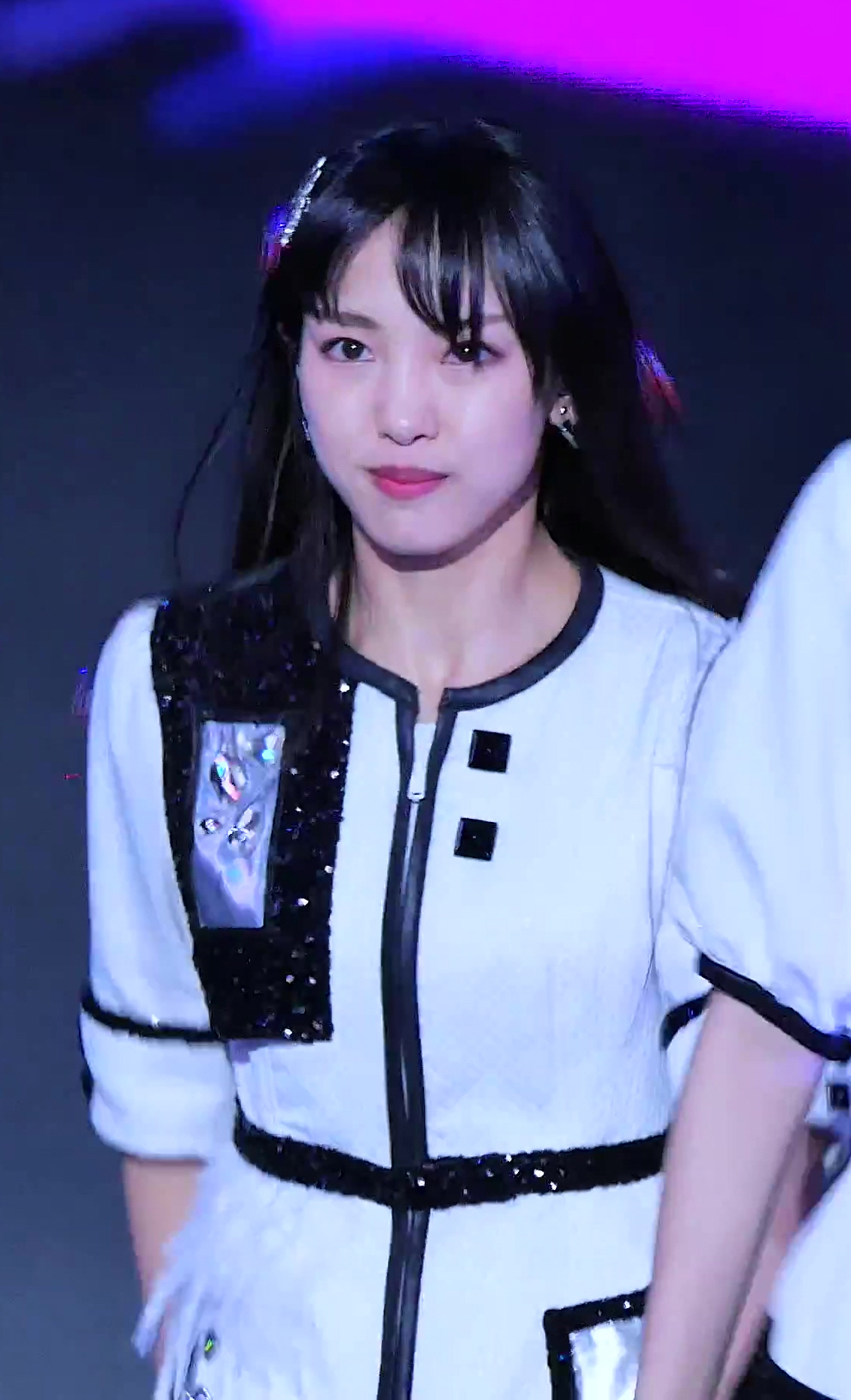
- Haruna Iikubo in 2016

Background information
- Also known as: Harunan (はるなん)
- Born: November 7, 1994 (age 31); Tokyo, Japan
- Occupations: Singer; dancer; actress
- Musical career
- Genres: J-pop
- Years active: 2011–present
- Label: Zetima

Haruna Iikubo (飯窪 春菜, Īkubo Haruna; born on November 7, 1994 in Tokyo) is a Japanese actress and former pop singer. She is a former tenth-generation member and sub-leader of the pop group Morning Musume and former model for the Japanese fashion magazine Love Berry.

== Biography ==
=== Early life ===
Haruna Īkubo was born on November 7, 1994, in Tokyo, Japan.

=== 2009–2011: Modelling ===
In 2009, Haruna won a special award at the exclusive auditions for the fashion magazine Love Berry. She first appeared as a model in the June number of the magazine. Since the July issue, Haruna Iikubo adopted the stage name Hau Dan (壇 はう). She "graduated" from Love Berry (left the project) in the February 2011 number.

=== 2009–2018: Debut in Morning Musume ===
On September 29, 2011, at a concert at Nippon Budokan, which was part of Morning Musume Concert Tour 2011 Aki Ai Believe: Takahashi Ai Sotsugyō Kinen Special, it was announced that Haruna Iikubo passed the auditions alongside three other girls: Ayumi Ishida, Masaki Satō and Haruka Kudō, and would be joining Morning Musume.

On April 18, 2012, it was announced that Morning Musume's Tanaka Reina and the 9th & 10th Generation members would participate in a new stage play titled Stacey's Shoujo Saisatsu Kageki. The musical ran from June 6 to 12. On July 20, it was announced that Iikubo, Yajima Maimi, Tokunaga Chinami, Natsuyaki Miyabi and Nakajima Saki were chosen to form the unit DIY♡.

On May 21, 2013, at Tanaka Reina's graduation concert, Haruna and Fukumura Mizuki were appointed the new sub-leaders of Morning Musume.

On August 17, 2018, Iikubo Haruna announced on her blog that she will graduate from both Morning Musume '18 and Hello! Project at the end of the fall tour Morning Musume '18 Concert Tour Aki ~Get Set, Go!~. She left the group on December 16, 2018.

On December 15, Iikubo announced she would produce and lend her voice to the virtual idol Ni-na under the VR corporation HIKKY.

== Discography ==
For Haruna Īkubo's releases with Morning Musume, see Morning Musume discography.

== Bibliography ==
=== Photobooks ===
1. Haruiro (春色) (January 28, 2017, Odyssey Books, ISBN 978-4908643088)
2. Female (May 12, 2018, Odyssey Books, ISBN 978-4908643231)

== Filmography ==
=== Movies ===
- Inu to Anata no Monogatari: Inu no Eiga (犬とあなたの物語 いぬのえいが) (2011)
- Gekijouban Hontou ni Atta Kowai Hanashi 2019 ~Fuyu no Tokubetsu Hen~ (劇場版ほんとうにあった怖い話2019～冬の特別篇～) (2019)

=== Television ===
- Glass no Kiba (ガラスの牙) (Chubu-Nippon/TBS, 2010)
- Sūgaku Joshi Gakuen (数学♥女子学園) (NTV, 2012)
- Toubou Ryourinin Watanabe (逃亡料理人ワタナベ) (2019)
- Toritsu Mizushou! ~Reiwa~ (都立水商！〜令和〜) (2019)

=== Theater ===
- Stacies Shoujo Saisatsu Kageki (ステーシーズ 少女再殺歌劇) (2012)
- Gogakuyuu (ごがくゆう) (2013)
- Triangle (トライアングル) (2015)
- Zoku 11nin Iru! Higashi no Chihei, Nishi no Towa (続・11人いる！東の地平・西の永遠) (2016)
- Pharaoh no Haka (ファラオの墓) (2017)
- Pharaoh no Haka (ファラオの墓～蛇王・スネフェル～) (2017)
- Harukanaru Toki no Naka de 6 Gaiden ~Tasogare no Kamen~ (遙かなる時空の中で6 外伝 〜黄昏ノ仮面〜) (2019)
- Tokyo Revengers (東京卍リベンジャーズ) (2023)
