= Ayumi Ishida (singer) =

Japanese pop singer (born 1997)

Ayumi Ishida 石田亜佑美
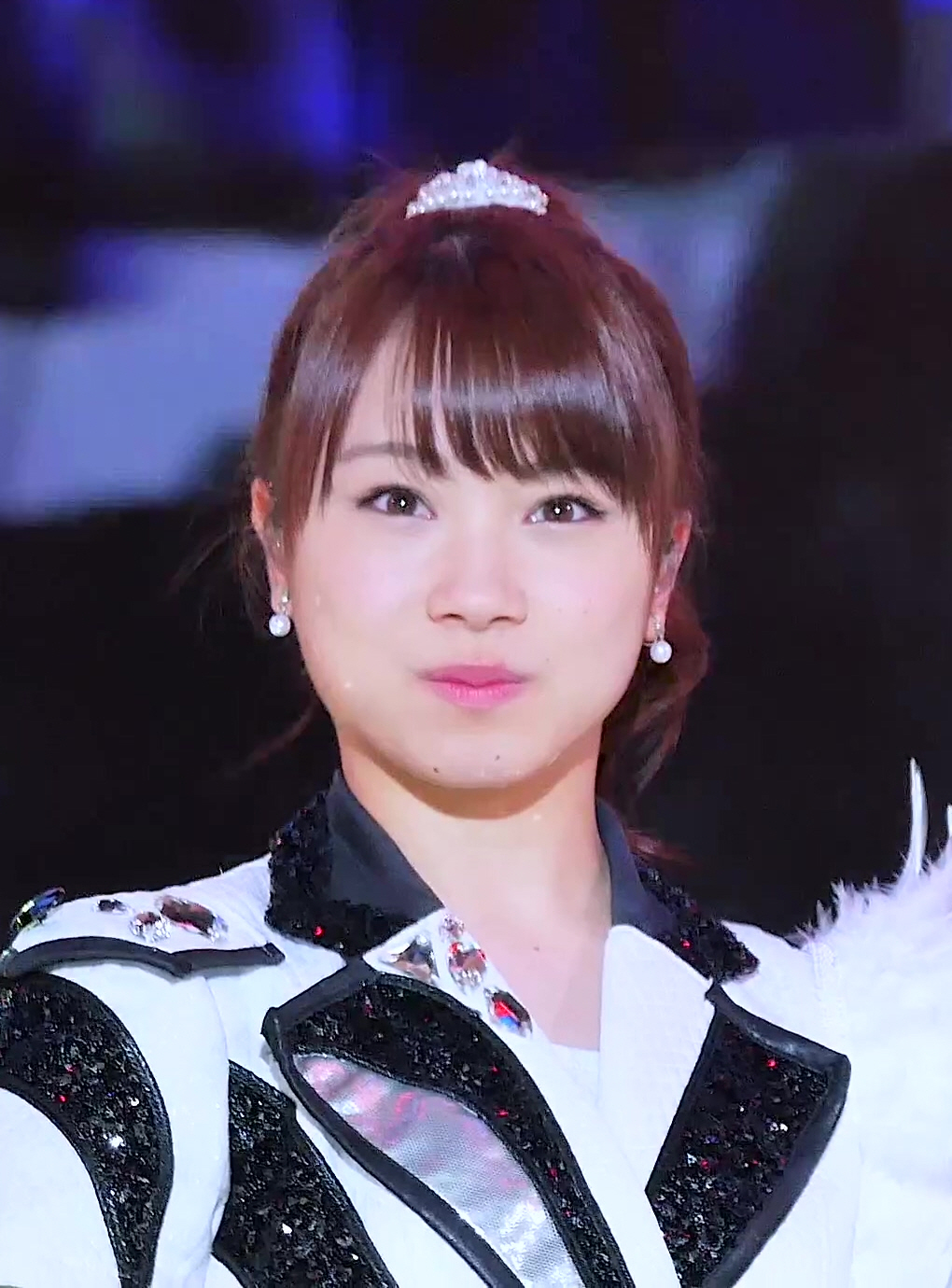

Background information
- Born: 7 January 1997 (age 29)
- Origin: Sendai, Miyagi, Japan
- Genres: Japanese pop
- Occupations: Singer; Model; actor; Rapper
- Instrument: Vocals
- Years active: 2011–present
- Label: Zetima
- Formerly of: Morning Musume; Hello! Project

Ayumi Ishida (石田亜佑美, Ishida Ayumi) (born 7 January 1997) is a Japanese singer. She is a former tenth-generation member and sub-leader of the pop group Morning Musume.

== Biography ==
=== Early life ===
Ayumi Ishida was born on 7 January 1997, in Sendai, Miyagi, Japan. Prior to debuting in Morning Musume, she was as back-up dancer for Dorothy Little Happy.

=== 2011–2024: Debut in Morning Musume ===
On 29 September 2011, at a concert at Nippon Budokan, which was part of Morning Musume Concert Tour 2011 Aki Ai Believe: Takahashi Ai Sotsugyō Kinen Special, it was announced that Ishida had passed the auditions alongside three other girls: Haruna Iikubo, Masaki Satō and Haruka Kudō, and would join Morning Musume.

In October 2012, Ishida was announced as a member of the new Satoyama Movement unit, Harvest, alongside, Erina Ikuta, Masaki Satō and Akari Takeuchi. In March 2013, Ishida was announced as a member of the new Satoumi Movement unit, Plumeria.

On 31 December 2018, she became sub-leader of Morning Musume alongside Erina Ikuta.

On May 26, 2024, it was announced that Ayumi Ishida would be graduating from Morning Musume and Hello! Project at the end of the group's upcoming autumn concert tour.

On December 6, Ayumi Ishida officially graduated at the Morning Musume '24 Concert Tour Aki WE CAN DANCE ! ~Blå Eld~ Ishida Ayumi FINAL Ishida Ayumi Sotsugyou Special in Yokohama Arena. Her graduation concert was streamed live exclusively on Hulu.

== Discography ==
For Ayumi Ishida's releases with Morning Musume, see Morning Musume discography.

== Bibliography ==
=== Photobooks ===
- Ayumi Ishida (石田亜佑美) (July 15, 2013, Wani Books, ISBN 978-4-8470-4562-2)
- Shine More (May 10, 2014, Wani Books, ISBN 978-4-8470-4646-9)
- It's My Turn (June 27, 2016, Wani Books, ISBN 978-4-8470-4848-7)
- 20th Canvas (April 27, 2018, Wani Books, ISBN 978-4-8470-8119-4)
- Believe in Oneself (January 7, 2020, Wani Books, ISBN 978-4-8470-8257-3)

== Filmography ==
=== DVDs and Blu-rays ===
Title	Album details	Peak chart positions	
Title	Album details	JPN	
Title	Album details	DVD	Blu-ray
Ayumi in Guam	Released: 14 August 2013; Label: Zetima; Formats: DVD	70	—
Souka (颯夏)	Released: 2 July 2014; Label: Zetima; Formats: DVD	56	—
It's a Beautiful Day	Released: 27 July 2016; Label: Zetima; Formats: Blu-ray	—	49

=== Television ===
- Sūgaku Joshi Gakuen (数学♥女子学園) (NTV, 2012)
