= Reina Tanaka =

- 田中れいな
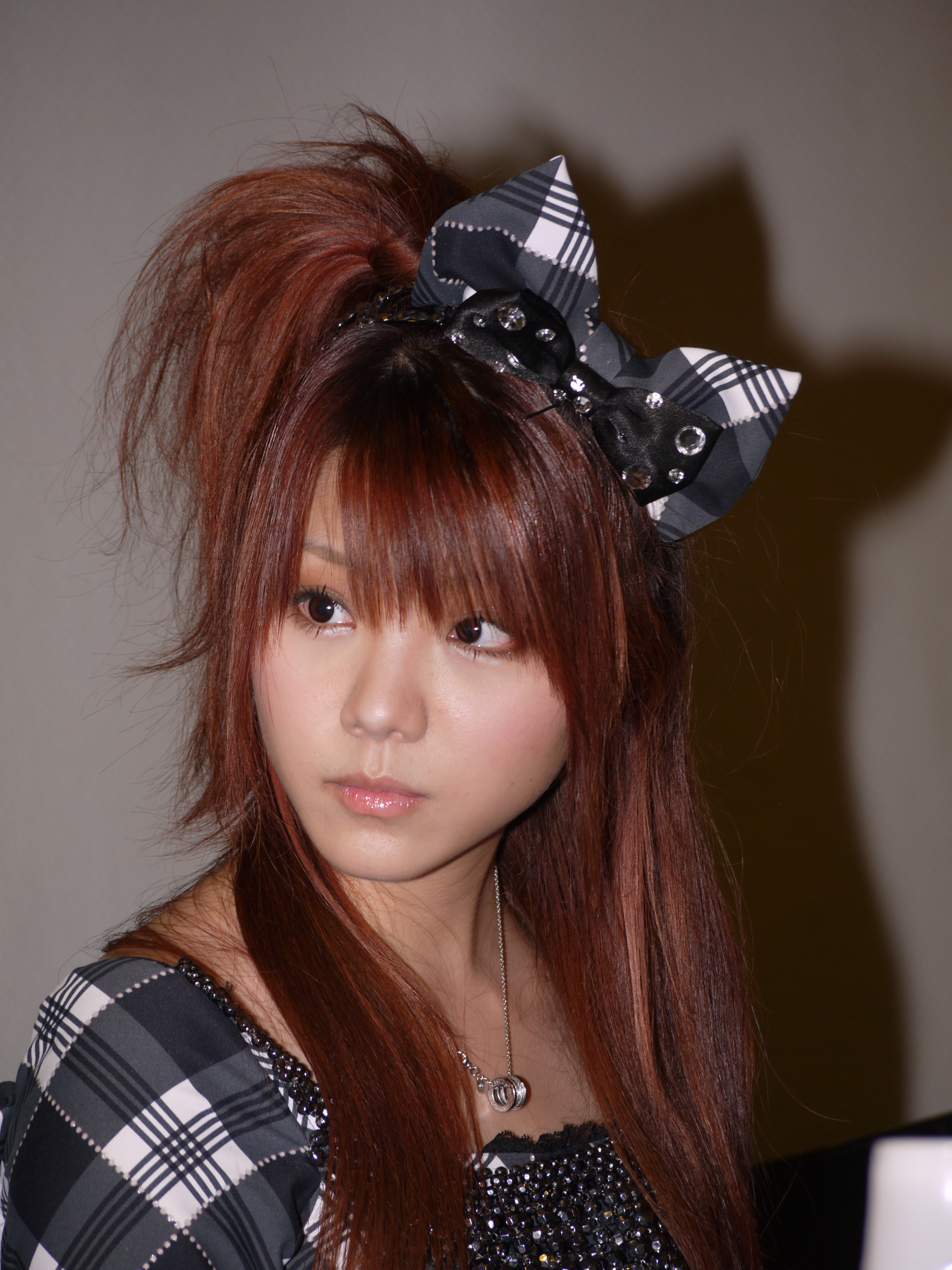
- Tanaka in July 2010
- Born: Reina Tanaka (田中麗奈); November 11, 1989 (age 36); Fukuoka, Fukuoka Prefecture, Japan
- Occupations: Singer; actress
- Height: 154 cm (5 ft 1 in)
- Spouse: Unknown (m. 2024)
- Children: 1
- Musical career
- Genres: J-pop; Rock
- Instrument: Vocals
- Years active: 2002–present
- Labels: Zetima; Piccolo Town
- Member of: Lovendor
- Formerly of: Hello! Project; Morning Musume; Aa!; Morning Musume Otomegumi; Elegies; High-King

Reina Tanaka (田中 れいな, Tanaka Reina; born November 11, 1989) is a Japanese singer and musical actress. She is the leader of the Japanese rock band Lovendor. From 2002 to 2013, she was one of the main vocalists of the girl group Morning Musume and participated in other music acts under the Hello! Project name.

== Career ==
=== 2001–2013: Morning Musume ===
Tanaka auditioned for a spot in Morning Musume's 5th Generation in 2001 and passed, but had to leave the training camp for being under the age limit. She attempted again in 2002 for a position in the 6th Generation and passed along with members Eri Kamei and Sayumi Michishige. She provided the main vocals for the single "Shabondama". She was featured in two solo versions of "Memory Seishun no Hikari" on a fan club release CD.

In 2003, Tanaka became a member of the sub-unit Aa!, along with Miyabi Natsuyaki and Airi Suzuki, two Hello! Project Kids members. They released one single, "First Kiss", on October 29, 2003. Later, in 2004, she participated in singing "All for One & One for All!", a collaboration single released by all Hello! Project artists under the name "H.P. All Stars." She also sang the coupling track, "Suki ni Naccha Ikenai Hito", with Suzuki and Megumi Murakami.

On March 28, 2008, Tanaka made her voice acting debut as Kirara, the main character in Sanrio's anime Onegai My Melody Kirara, the fourth My Melody series. The show premiered on April 6, 2008.

In 2008, Tanaka became the leader of Hello Project's new unit High-King.

In 2009–2010 Tanaka voiced the main/title character of the anime series, Kaitō Reinya. The character had been modeled on Tanaka. The show began airing on January 8, 2010.

Tanaka graduated from Morning Musume on May 21, 2013, and subsequently concentrated her activities on her rock band Lovendor.

=== 2013–present: Lovendor and solo activities ===
Lovendor was formed in 2012. Originally there were four members: Reina Tanaka, Marina Okada, Yuki Uozumi, Marin Miyazawa.

In June 2019 it was announced that Lovendor would be going on hiatus.

Tanaka has also performed in various musicals and, as of 2018, has been increasing her solo live activities.

== Personal life ==
Tanaka was born in Fukuoka Prefecture, Japan. Her brother is seven years younger than her.

On July 15, 2024, she announced her marriage and pregnancy of her first child. On November 18, she gave birth to her daughter.

== Discography ==
=== Studio albums ===
Title	Release date
Laugh and Peace (ラフ・アンド・ピース; (Collaborative album with Ai Takahashi & Natsuyaki Miyabi))	April 27, 2022

=== Digital singles ===
Title	Release date
Seinaru Kane ga Hibiku Yoru (聖なる鐘がひびく夜; The Night the Holy Bell Rings (Tanpopo cover))	December 10, 2010
Manatsu no Kōsen (真夏の光線; A Ray of Light in the Midsummer (Morning Musume cover))	January 27, 2011
Egao ni Namida: Thank You! Dear My Friends (笑顔に涙~THANK YOU! DEAR MY FRIENDS~; Smiles and Tears ~Thank You! My Dear Friends~ (Aya Matsuura cover))	February 16, 2011
Koi no Hana (恋の花; Flower of Love (Natsumi Abe cover))	February 16, 2011
Onegai Miwaku no Target (お願い魅惑のターゲット; Please, Attracting Target (Melon Kinenbi cover))	March 2, 2011
Kōsui (香水; Perfume (Melon Kinenbi cover))	March 2, 2011
Oyoge! Taiyaki-kun (およげ！たいやきくん; (with Ai Takahashi & Natsuyaki Miyabi))	June 21, 2021
Summer Night Town (サマーナイトタウン; (with Masaki Sato))	August 13, 2022

=== Collaborations/others ===
Title	Release date
H.P. All Stars - All for One & One for All! (#3 Suki ni Naccha Ikenai Hito (Reina Tanaka, Megumi Murakami, Airi Suzuki))	December 1, 2004
Champloo 1: Happy Marriage Song Cover Shū (#6 Heya to Y Shirt to Watashi (Hiramatsu Eri cover))	July 15, 2009
Petit Best 11 (#12 Mesunda Heart wa Koko Desu ka? (Reina Tanaka with Chorus: Yui Ogura and Buruburuiyaan (Arisa Noto and SachikaMisawa ))	December 15, 2010
Petit Best 14 (#10 Rock no Teigi)	December 11, 2013

== Releases ==
=== Photobooks ===
Title	Release date	Publisher	ISBN	Information
Hello Hello! Morning Musume 6th Generation Members Shashinshū (ハロハロ! モーニング娘。6期メンバー写真集)	July 15, 2003	Kadokawa Shoten	ISBN 4-04-894251-4	Photobook with Eri Kamei and Sayumi Michishige.
Reina Tanaka (田中れいな写真集「田中れいな」)	November 11, 2004	Wani Books	ISBN 4-8470-2834-1	First solo photobook.
Reina (田中れいな写真集「れいな」)	October 15, 2005	Wani Books	ISBN 4-8470-2890-2	Second solo photobook.
Shōjo R (田中れいな写真集「少女R」)	May 10, 2006	Wani Books	ISBN 4-8470-2932-1	Third solo photobook.
Alo Hello! Reina Tanaka Shashinshū (アロハロ！田中れいな写真集)	February 1, 2007	Kadokawa Shoten	ISBN 4-04-894483-5; ISBN 978-4-04-894483-0	Fourth solo photobook. Photographed in Hawaii.
Girl (田中れいな写真集「GIRL」)	September 27, 2007	Wani Books	ISBN 978-4-8470-4041-2	Fifth solo photobook.
Re:(Return) (田中れいな写真集全集『Re:（リターン）』)	February 27, 2008	Wani Books	ISBN 978-4-8470-4067-2	Compilation photobook.
Very Reina (田中れいな写真集「VERY REINA」)	October 25, 2008	Wani Books	ISBN 978-4-8470-4129-7	Sixth solo photobook.
Kira Kira (田中れいな写真集「きら★きら」)	May 9, 2012	Kids Net	ISBN 978-4-0489-5448-8	Seventh solo photobook. Photographed in Guam.

=== DVDs ===
- Alo Hello! Reina Tanaka DVD (アロハロ！田中れいな DVD, Released February 14, 2007)
- Real Challenge!! (Released October 2008)
- e-Hello! "Attracted" DVD (e-Hello! 「Attracted」 DVD, Released March 11, 2011)

== Acting ==
=== Movies ===
- Hoshisuna no Shima, Watashi no Shima: Island Dreamin' (星砂の島、私の島～Island Dreamin'～; Released September 29, 2004)
- Yona Yona Penguin (よなよなペンギン; Released December 23, 2009) - Voice of Fairy
- Keitai Deka The Movie 3 Morning Musume Kyushutsu Daisakusen! Pandora no Hako no Himitsu (ケータイ刑事 THE MOVIE3 モーニング娘。救出大作戦！～パンドラの箱の秘密; Released February 5, 2011)
- Vampire Stories: Chasers (ヴァンパイア・ストーリーズ:Chasers; Released December 27, 2011)

=== Theater ===
Year	Title	Role	Notes
2006	Princess Knight: The Musical		
2008	Cinderella: The Musical	Stepsister Joy	
2009	Ojigi de Shape Up!	Reina Kuroda	
2011	Reborn: Inochi no Audition	Bebe	
2011	Stacy's Shojo Saisatsu Kageki	Eiko	
2016	Fushigi Yûgi: Shu no Shō	Miaka Yūki	Lead role
2017	Aku no Musume	Rilliane Lucifen D'Autriche (portrayed by Rin Kagamine)	Lead role
2018	Fushigi Yûgi: Ao no Shō	Miaka Yūki	Lead role
2018	YoRHa Musical Ver 1.2	Number 4	
2019	Anne of Green Gables	Anne Shirley	Lead role

=== TV shows ===
All shows listed were broadcast by TV Tokyo, with the exception of Kaitō Reinya, which was aired on ANN's KBC TV channel, Hanbun ESPer which aired on FujiTVTWO and Sūgaku Joshi Gakuen which aired on Nippon Television.

Show	Start date	End date
Hello! Morning (ハロー！モーニング。)	2003	April 1, 2007
Sore Yuke! Gorokkies (それゆけ!ゴロッキーズ)	September 29, 2003	December 26, 2003
Futarigoto (二人ゴト)	June 1, 2004	June 4, 2004
Futarigoto (二人ゴト)	August 18, 2004	August 26, 2004
Musume Dokyu! (娘DOKYU!)	May 13, 2005	September 29, 2006
Uta Doki! Pop Classics (歌ドキッ！POP CLASSICS)	October 2, 2006	March 17, 2008
Haromoni@ (ハロモニ@)	April 8, 2007	September 28, 2008
Onegai My Melody Kirara (Voice) (おねがい♪マイメロディ きららっ☆)	April 6, 2008	March 29, 2009
Yorosen! (よろせん!)	October 6, 2008	March 27, 2009
Kaitō Reinya (怪盗レーニャ) (Voice)	January 8, 2010	March 26, 2010
Hanbun ESPer (半分エスパー) (Guest)	January 15, 2010	March 19, 2010
Sūgaku Joshi Gakuen (数学♥女子学園)	January 11, 2012	March 28, 2012
Kishiryu Sentai Ryusoulger (騎士竜戦隊リュウソウジャー)	April 28, 2019	May 5, 2019

=== Radio ===
Program	Start date	End date	Station
TBC Fun Fīrudo Mōretsu Mōdasshu (TBC Funふぃーるど・モーレツモーダッシュ)	April 18, 2005	April 29, 2005	TBC Radio
TBC Fun Fīrudo Mōretsu Mōdasshu (TBC Funふぃーるど・モーレツモーダッシュ)	May 16, 2005	April 27, 2005	TBC Radio
Hello Pro Yanen!! (ハロプロやねん!!)	June 26, 2005	September 22, 2008	ABC Radio
Five Stars	October 3, 2007	Feb 25, 2010	InterFM
ReinaTime (れいなたいむ)	April 4, 2012 (Ongoing)		RKB Radio

=== Publications ===
Title	Start date	End date	Publication
Tanaka(me)sen (タナカ（め）せん)	June 12, 2006 (Ongoing)	--	CD&DL Data
