= Morning Musume discography =

Japanese girl group discography

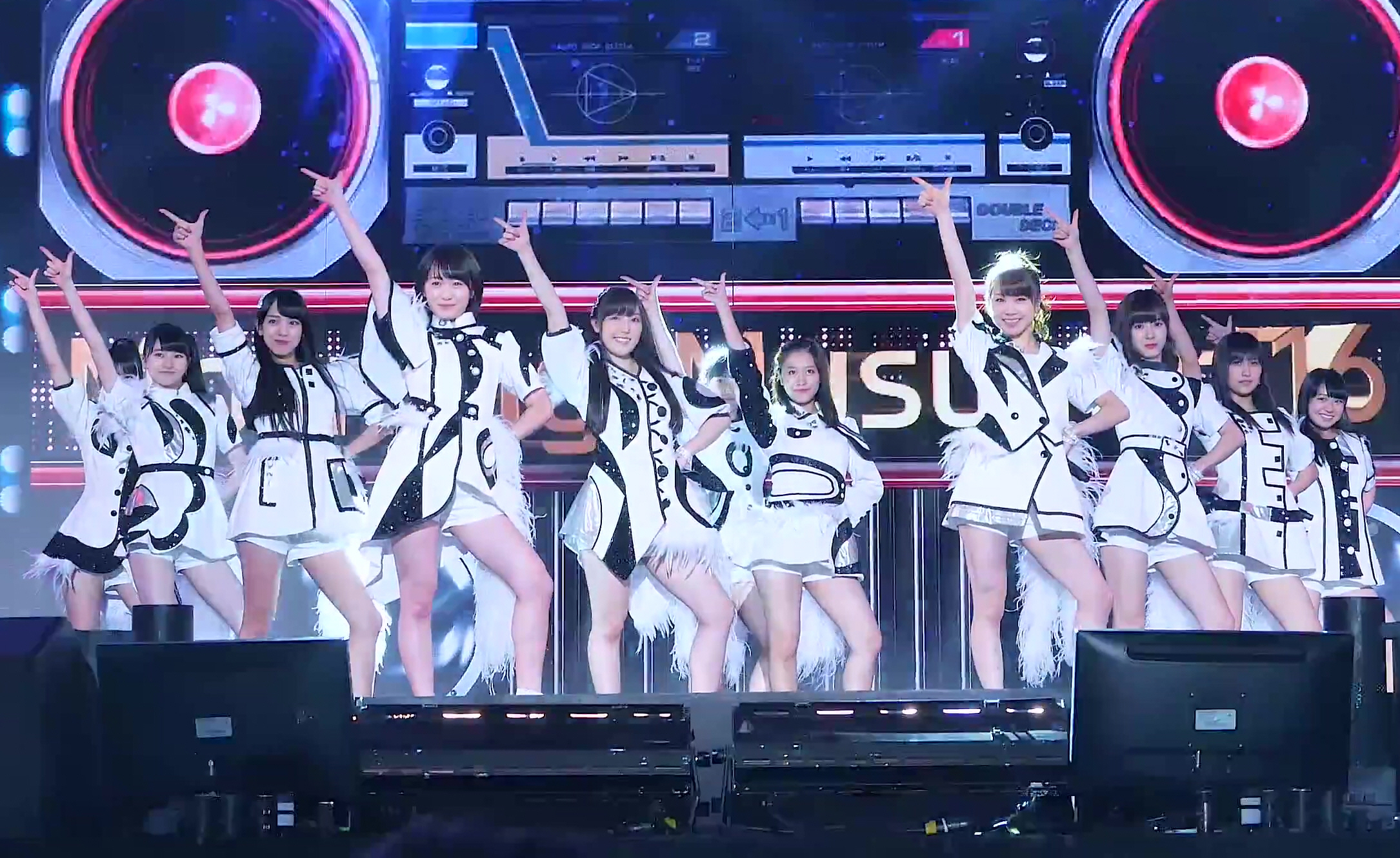
- Morning Musume in 2016
- Studio albums: 17
- Extended plays: 2
- Soundtrack albums: 3
- Compilation albums: 5
- Tribute albums: 1
- Singles: 76
- Video albums: 30 (Note: This includes the music video compilation albums and concert DVDs.)
- Music videos: 93 (Note: This does not include the alternate versions of some music videos.)
- Musical albums: 3

The discography of the Japanese girl group Morning Musume consists of seventeen studio albums, five compilation albums, and seventy four singles. Ever since its establishment in 1997, the group has experienced frequent line-up changes, and currently consists of eleven members: Miki Nonaka (leader), Sakura Oda (sub-leader), Homare Okamura, Mei Yamazaki, Rio Sakurai, Haruka Inoue, Ako Yumigeta, Meisa Sugihara, Miyu Yasuda, Moa Suzuki and Hanano Ishikawa. The group was formed by Sharam Q vocalist Tsunku, who serves as their lyricist, composer, and producer.

== Albums ==
=== Studio albums ===
Title	Album details	Peak chart positions			Sales	Certifications
Title	Album details	JPN	JPN Billb.	KOR	Sales	Certifications
First Time	Released: July 8, 1998; Label: Zetima	4	—	—	JPN: 310,000	RIAJ: Gold
Second Morning	Released: July 28, 1999; Label: Zetima	3	—	—	JPN: 426,620	RIAJ: Platinum
3rd: Love Paradise	Released: March 29, 2000; Label: Zetima	2	—	—	JPN: 863,300	RIAJ: Million
4th Ikimasshoi!	Released: March 27, 2002; Label: Zetima	1	—	—	JPN: 515,440	RIAJ: Platinum
No. 5	Released: March 26, 2003; Label: Zetima	1	—	—	JPN: 175,292	RIAJ: Platinum
Ai no Dai 6 Kan	Released: December 8, 2004; Label: Zetima	7	—	—	JPN: 73,333	
Rainbow 7	Released: February 15, 2006; Label: Zetima	7	—	—	JPN: 44,714	
Sexy 8 Beat	Released: March 21, 2007; Label: Zetima	7	—	—	JPN: 31,819	
Platinum 9 Disc	Released: March 18, 2009; Label: Zetima	13	13	—	JPN: 19,143	
10 My Me	Released: March 17, 2010; Label: Zetima	9	15	16	JPN: 16,133	
Fantasy! Jūichi	Released: December 1, 2010; Label: Zetima	16	15	41	JPN: 13,062	
12, Smart	Released: October 12, 2011; Label: Zetima	8	8	83	JPN: 13,889	
13 Colourful Character	Released: September 12, 2012; Label: Zetima	6	5	16	JPN: 18,760	
14 Shō: The Message	Release: October 29, 2014; Label: Zetima	7	5	—	JPN: 30,783	
15 Thank You, Too	Release: December 6, 2017; Label: Zetima	4	5	—	JPN: 37,800	
16th: That's J-pop	Release: March 31, 2021; Label: Zetima	2	2	—	JPN: 40,651	
Professionals-17th	Release: November 27, 2024; Label: Zetima	4	—	—	JPN: 28,802	
"—" denotes releases that did not chart or were not released in that territory.

=== Compilation albums ===
Title	Album details	Peak chart positions	Sales	Certifications
Title	Album details	JPN	Sales	Certifications
Best! Morning Musume 1	Released: January 31, 2001; Label: Zetima	1	JPN: 2,259,510; TWN: 32,281	RIAJ: 2× Million; RIT: Gold
Best! Morning Musume 2	Released: March 31, 2004; Label: Zetima	4	JPN: 180,897	RIAJ: Gold
Early Single Box	Released: December 15, 2004; Label: Zetima	27		
Morning Musume All Singles Complete: 10th Anniversary	Released: October 24, 2007; Label: Zetima	6	JPN: 47,130	
Morning Musume Zen Single Coupling Collection	Released: October 7, 2009; Label: Zetima	9	JPN: 11,464	
The Best! ~Updated Morning Musume~	Released: September 25, 2013; Label: Zetima	6	JPN: 21,848	
Morning Musume '14 Coupling Collection 2	Released: March 12, 2014; Label: Zetima	15	JPN: 11,827	
Best! Morning Musume 20th Anniversary	Released: March 20, 2019; Label: Zetima	1	JPN: 43,932	
Morning Musume Best Selection ~The 25 Shuunen~	Released: August 30, 2023; Label: Zetima	3	JPN: 26,621	

=== Cover albums ===
Title	Album details	Peak chart positions	Sales
Title	Album details	JPN	Sales
Cover You	Released: November 26, 2008; Label: Zetima	27	JPN: 12,037

=== Soundtrack albums ===
Title	Album details
Morning Cop: Daite Hold on Me! (with Michiyo Heike)	Released: September 30, 1998; Label: Zetima
Pinch Runner	Released: July 5, 2000; Label: Zetima
Koinu Dan no Monogatari (with Hello! Project Kids)	Released: February 14, 2003; Label: Zetima

=== Musical albums ===
Title	Album details
Love Century: Yume wa Minakerya Hajimaranai	Released: August 1, 2001; Label: Zetima
Edokko Chushingura	Released: July 2, 2003; Label: Zetima
Ribbon no Kishi	Released: July 26, 2006; Label: Zetima
Fashionable	Released: September 15, 2010; Label: Sony Music Entertainment

== Extended plays ==
Title	Album details	Peak chart positions		Sales
Title	Album details	JPN	JPN Billb.	Sales
7.5 Fuyu Fuyu Morning Musume Mini!	Released: December 13, 2006; Label: Zetima	14	—	JPN: 29,645
Hatachi no Morning Musume (as Morning Musume. 20th)	Released: February 7, 2018; Label: Zetima	1	1	JPN: 50,010

== Singles ==
Title	Year	Peak chart positions		Sales	Certifications	Album
Title	Year	JPN	JPN Billb.	Sales	Certifications	Album
"Ai no Tane"	1997	—	—	50,000		First Time
"Morning Coffee"	1998	6	—	200,790	RIAJ: Gold	First Time
"Summer Night Town"	1998	4	—	417,330	RIAJ: Platinum	First Time
"Daite Hold on Me!"	1998	1	—	497,120	RIAJ: Platinum	Second Morning
"Memory Seishun no Hikari"	1999	2	—	410,850	RIAJ: Platinum	Second Morning
"Manatsu no Kōsen"	1999	3	—	235,010	RIAJ: Gold	Second Morning
"Furusato"	1999	5	—	170,670	RIAJ: Gold	Second Morning
"Love Machine"	1999	1	—	1,646,630	RIAJ: 3× Platinum	3rd: Love Paradise
"Koi no Dance Site"	2000	2	—	1,229,970	RIAJ: 3× Platinum	3rd: Love Paradise
"Happy Summer Wedding"	2000	1	—	990,950	RIAJ: Million	Best! Morning Musume 1
"I Wish"	2000	1	—	654,640	RIAJ: Platinum	Best! Morning Musume 1
"Ren'ai Revolution 21"	2000	2	—	986,040	RIAJ: 2× Platinum	4th Ikimasshoi!
"The Peace!"	2001	1	—	682,320	RIAJ: Platinum	4th Ikimasshoi!
"Mr. Moonlight (Ai no Big Band)"	2001	1	—	513,340	RIAJ: Platinum	4th Ikimasshoi!
"Sōda! We're Alive"	2002	1	—	443,630	RIAJ: Platinum	4th Ikimasshoi!
"Do It! Now"	2002	3	—	312,523	RIAJ: Gold	No. 5
"Koko ni Iruzee!"	2002	1	—	228,542	RIAJ: Gold	No. 5
"Morning Musume no Hyokkori Hyōtanjima"	2003	4	—	151,342	RIAJ: Gold	Best! Morning Musume 2
"As for One Day"	2003	1	—	129,893	RIAJ: Gold	Best! Morning Musume 2
"Shabondama"	2003	2	—	151,104	RIAJ: Gold	Best! Morning Musume 2
"Go Girl (Koi no Victory)"	2003	4	—	145,340	RIAJ: Gold	Best! Morning Musume 2
"Ai Araba It's All Right"	2004	2	—	108,368	RIAJ: Gold	Best! Morning Musume 2
"Roman (My Dear Boy)"	2004	4	—	87,255	RIAJ: Gold	Ai no Dai 6 Kan
"Joshi Kashimashi Monogatari"	2004	3	—	91,789	RIAJ: Gold	Ai no Dai 6 Kan
"Namida ga Tomaranai Hōkago"	2004	4	—	65,873		Ai no Dai 6 Kan
"The Manpower"	2005	4	—	67,860		Rainbow 7
"Osaka Koi no Uta"	2005	2	—	59,287		Rainbow 7
"Iroppoi Jirettai"	2005	4	—	82,200		Rainbow 7
"Chokkan 2 (Nogashita Sakana wa Ōkiizo!)"	2005	4	—	54,428		Rainbow 7
"Sexy Boy (Soyokaze ni Yorisotte)"	2006	4	—	48,667		Sexy 8 Beat
"Ambitious! Yashinteki de Ii Jan"	2006	4	—	47,159		Sexy 8 Beat
"Aruiteru"	2006	1	—	55,694		7.5 Fuyu Fuyu Morning Musume Mini!
"Egao Yes Nude"	2007	4	—	53,047		Sexy 8 Beat
"Kanashimi Twilight"	2007	2	—	61,322		Morning Musume All Singles Complete: 10th Anniversary
"Onna ni Sachi Are"	2007	2	—	50,812		Morning Musume All Singles Complete: 10th Anniversary
"Mikan"	2007	6	—	38,667		Platinum 9 Disc
"Resonant Blue"	2008	3	8	55,949		Platinum 9 Disc
"Pepper Keibu"	2008	3	8	46,067		Cover You
"Naichau Kamo"	2009	3	8	50,313		Platinum 9 Disc
"Shōganai Yume Oibito"	2009	1	9	53,950		10 My Me
"Nanchatte Ren'ai"	2009	2	4	70,299		10 My Me
"Kimagure Princess"	2009	4	14	45,241		10 My Me
"Onna ga Medatte Naze Ikenai"	2010	5	16	44,035		10 My Me
"Seishun Collection"	2010	3	13	40,865		Fantasy! Jūichi
"Onna to Otoko no Lullaby Game"	2010	6	11	48,357		Fantasy! Jūichi
"Maji Desu ka Ska!"	2011	5	7	41,029		12, Smart
"Only You"	2011	4	12	40,778		12, Smart
"Kono Chikyū no Heiwa o Honki de Negatterun Da yo! / Kare to Issho ni Omise ga Shitai!"	2011	2	3	55,643		12, Smart
"Pyocopyoco Ultra"	2012	3	6	34,050		13 Colorful Character
"Ren'ai Hunter"	2012	3	3	49,232		13 Colorful Character
"One Two Three / The Matenrō Show"	2012	3	3	110,475	RIAJ: Gold	13 Colorful Character
"Wakuteka Take a Chance"	2012	3	3	88,977	RIAJ: Gold	The Best! ~Updated Morning Musume~
"Help Me"	2013	1	2	103,936	RIAJ: Gold	The Best! ~Updated Morning Musume~
"Brainstorming / Kimi Sae Ireba Nani mo Iranai"	2013	1	2	106,680	RIAJ: Gold	The Best! ~Updated Morning Musume~
"Wagamama Ki no Mama Ai no Joke / Ai no Gundan"	2013	1	2	158,915	RIAJ: Gold	The Best! ~Updated Morning Musume~
"Egao no Kimi wa Taiyō sa / Kimi no Kawari wa Iyashinai / What is Love?"	2014	1	4	160,798	RIAJ: Gold	14 Shō: The Message
"Toki o Koe Sora o Koe / Password is 0"	2014	1	3	132,225	RIAJ: Gold	14 Shō: The Message
"Tiki Bun / Shabadaba Dū / Mikaeri Bijin"	2014	2	7	142,077	RIAJ: Gold	14 Shō: The Message
"Seishun Kozo ga Naiteiru / Yūgure wa Ameagari / Ima Koko Kara"	2015	2	4	108,813	RIAJ: Gold	Best! Morning Musume 20th Anniversary
"Oh My Wish! / Sukatto My Heart / Ima Sugu Tobikomu Yūki"	2015	2	6	149,309	RIAJ: Gold	Best! Morning Musume 20th Anniversary
"Tsumetai Kaze to Kataomoi / Endless Sky / One and Only"	2015	1	2	153,242	RIAJ: Gold	Best! Morning Musume 20th Anniversary
"Utakata Saturday Night! / The Vision / Tokyo to Iu Katasumi"	2016	2	2	121,477	RIAJ: Gold	Best! Morning Musume 20th Anniversary
"Sexy Cat no Enzetsu / Mukidashi de Mukiatte / Sō ja Nai"	2016	1	2	105,412	RIAJ: Gold	Best! Morning Musume 20th Anniversary
"Brand New Morning / Jealousy Jealousy"	2017	2	2	89,618	RIAJ: Gold	15 Thank You, Too
"Jama Shinaide Here We Go! / Dokyū no Go Sign / Wakaindashi!"	2017	2	1	118,588	RIAJ: Gold	15 Thank You, Too
"Are You Happy? / A Gonna"	2018	1	1	130,371	RIAJ: Gold	Best! Morning Musume 20th Anniversary
"Furari Ginza / Jiyū na Kuni Dakara"	2018	2	2	120,418	RIAJ: Gold	Best! Morning Musume 20th Anniversary
"Jinsei Blues / Seishun Night"	2019	3	3	124,536	RIAJ: Gold	16th ~That's J-POP~
"Kokoro & Karada / Lovepedia / Ningen Kankei No Way Way"	2020	2	3	134,295	RIAJ: Gold	16th ~That's J-POP~
"Junjou Evidence / Gyuusaretai Dake na no ni"	2020	2	4	118,962	RIAJ: Gold	16th ~That's J-POP~
"Teenage Solution / Yoshi Yoshi Shite Hoshii no / Beat no Wakusei"	2021	2	3	129,696	RIAJ: Gold	Morning Musume Best Selection ~The 25 Shuunen~
"Chu Chu Chu Bokura no Mirai / Dai Jinsei Never Been Better!"	2022	2	4	103,056	RIAJ: Gold	Morning Musume Best Selection ~The 25 Shuunen~
"Swing Swing Paradise / Happy Birthday to Me!"	2022	1	1	103,223	RIAJ: Gold	Morning Musume Best Selection ~The 25 Shuunen~
"Suggoi Fever! / Wake-Up Call (Mezameru Toki) / Neverending Shine"	2023	2	4	112,133	RIAJ: Gold	Professionals-17th
"Nandaka Sentimental na Toki no Uta / Saikiyō"	2024	1	4	103,399	RIAJ: Gold	Professionals-17th
"Ki ni Naru Sono Ki no Uta / Akaruku Ii Ko"	2025	2	2	83,148	RIAJ: Gold	TBA
"Teka Happy no Happy! / Watashi no Lamentazione"	2025	1	4	75,501	RIAJ: Gold	TBA
"Lonely...But not Alone / Yes ka No ka Watashi ka"	2026	4	4	87,495	RIAJ: Gold	TBA
"—" denotes releases that did not chart or were not released in that territory

=== Digital singles ===
Title	Year	Album
"Afternoon Coffee" (as Afternoon Musume)	2010	Dreams 1
"Ramen Revolution 2010 Long Type"	2010	Petit Best 11
"Ai no Tane (20th Anniversary Ver.)" (as Morning Musume 20th)	2017	Hatachi no Morning Musume
"Gosenfu no Tasuki"	2017	Hatachi no Morning Musume
"Morning Coffee (20th Anniversary Ver.)" (as Morning Musume 20th)	2018	Hatachi no Morning Musume
"Hana ga Saku Taiyō Abite"	2018	Hatachi no Morning Musume

=== Promotional singles ===
Title	Year	Peak chart positions		Sales	Album
Title	Year	JPN	JPN Billb.	Sales	Album
"Appare Kaitenzushi!" (as Muten Musume)	2010	13	—	JPN: 9,235	Petit Best 11

=== Collaboration singles ===
Title	Year	Peak chart positions		Sales	Album
Title	Year	JPN	JPN Billb.	Sales	Album
"Busu ni Naranai Tetsugaku" (as Hello! Project Mobekimasu, with Berryz Kobo, Cute, Erina Mano, and Smileage)	2011	4	5	JPN: 56,562	Petit Best 12
"Yeah Yeah Yeah / Akogare no Stress-free / Hana, Takenawa no Toki" (with Hello Pro All Stars)	2018	—	—		

=== Other appearances ===
Title	Year	Album
"Get you!" (as Sashining Musume, with AKB48)	2017	Thumbnail

== Videography ==
=== Music video compilations ===
Title	Details
Eizō The Morning Musume Best 10	Release: June 14, 2000; Label: Zetima; Format: VHS, DVD
Eizō The Morning Musume 2: Single M Clips	Release: December 4, 2002; Label: Zetima; Format: VHS, DVD
Eizō The Morning Musume 3: Single V Clips	Release: March 24, 2005; Label: Zetima
Eizō The Morning Musume 4: Single M Clips	Release: May 2, 2007; Label: Zetima
The Morning Musume All Singles Complete Zen 35 Kyoku: 10th Anniversary	Release: December 19, 2007; Label: Zetima; Limited release DVD with album.
Eizō The Morning Musume 5: Single M Clips	Release: August 19, 2009; Label: Zetima
Eizō The Morning Musume 6: Single M Clips	Release: April 13, 2011; Label: Zetima
Eizō The Morning Musume 7: Single M Clips	Release: November 14, 2012; Label: Zetima

=== Concerts videos ===
Title	Concert details
Hello! First Live at Shibuya Kōkaidō	Release: December 12, 1998; Label: Zetima; Format: VHS, CD (December 4, 2002)
Memory: Seishun no Hikari 1999.4.18	Release: June 30, 1999; Label: Zetima; Format: VHS, DVD (October 26, 2005); Asuka Fukuda's graduation concert.; Format: VHS, LD, DVD
Morning Musume First Live at Budōkan: Dancing Love Site 2000 Haru	Release: August 30, 2000; Label: Zetima; Sayaka Ichii's graduation concert.; Format: DVD
Morning Musume Live Revolution 21 Haru: Osaka City Hall Last Day	Release: June 27, 2001; Label: Zetima; Yuko Nakazawa's graduation concert.; Format: VHS, DVD
Green Live	Release: September 5, 2001; Label: Zetima; Took place after Hello! Project's 2001 athletic meet.; Format: DVD
Love Is Alive! Morning Musume Concert Tour 2002 Haru at Saitama Super Arena	Release: July 31, 2002; Label: Zetima; Contains extra footage of the concert.; Format: VHS, DVD
Morning Musume Love is Alive! 2002 Natsu at Yokohama Arena	Release: November 20, 2002; Label: Zetima; Maki Goto's graduation concert.; Contains extra footage of the concert.; Format: VHS, DVD
Morning Musume Concert Tour 2003 Haru Non Stop! at Saitama Super Arena	Release: June 25, 2003; Label: Zetima; Kei Yasuda's graduation concert.; Contains extra footage of the concert.; Format: VHS, DVD
Morning Musume Concert Tour 2003: 15nin de Non Stop!	Release: December 26, 2003; Label: Zetima; Contains backstage footage of the concert.; Format: DVD
Morning Musume Concert Tour 2004 Haru "The Best of Japan"	Release: July 14, 2004; Label: Zetima; Format: DVD
Morning Musume Concert Tour 2004: "The Best of Japan Natsu Aki '04"	Release: December 8, 2004; Label: Zetima; Contains backstage footage from during the concert.; Format: DVD
Morning Musume Concert Tour 2005 Haru: Dai 6 Kan Hit Mankai	Release: July 5, 2005; Label: Zetima; Rika Ishikawa's graduation concert.; Contains extra footage of the concert.; Format: DVD
Concert Tour 2005 Natsu Aki Baribari Kyōshitsu: "Koharu-chan Irasshai!"	Release: December 14, 2005; Label: Zetima; Contains extra footage of the concert.; Format: DVD
Morning Musume Concert Tour 2006 Haru: Rainbow Seven	Release: July 19, 2006; Label: Zetima; Format: DVD
Morning Musume Concert Tour 2006 Aki: Odore! Morning Curry	Release: December 27, 2006; Label: Zetima; Contains extra footage of the concert.; Format: DVD
Morning Musume Concert Tour 2007 Spring: Sexy 8 Beat	Release: July 4, 2007; Label: Zetima; Hitomi Yoshizawa's graduation concert.; Format: DVD
Morning Musume Concert Tour 2007 Aki: Bon Kyu! Bon Kyu! Bomb	Release: February 14, 2008; Label: Zetima; Format: DVD
Morning Musume Concert Tour 2008 Haru: Single Daizenshū	Release: June 30, 2008; Label: Zetima; Format: DVD
Morning Musume Concert Tour 2008 Aki: Resonant Live	Release: January 28, 2009; Label: Zetima; Contains several alternative performance of the concert.; Format: DVD
Morning Musume Concert Tour 2009 Spring: Platinum 9 Disco	Release: July 15, 2009; Label: Zetima; Format: DVD
Morning Musume Yomiuri Land East Live 2009	Release: January 20, 2010; Label: Zetima; Format: DVD
Morning Musume Concert Tour 2009 Aki: Nine Smile	Release: February 24, 2010; Label: Zetima; Koharu Kusumi's Graduation Concert.; Format: DVD
Morning Musume Concert Tour 2010 Haru: Pika Pika!	Label: Zetima; Format: DVD (July 14, 2010), Blu-ray disc (October 27, 2010)
Morning Musume Concert Tour 2010 Aki: Rival Survival	Label: Zetima; Eri Kamei, Linlin and Junjun's Graduation Concert.; Format: DVD (February 23, 2011), Blu-ray disc (March 3, 2011)
Morning Musume Concert Tour 2011 Haru: Sin Souseiki Fantasy DX ~9-Ki Men Wo Mukaete-~!	Label: Zetima; Format: DVD (July 27, 2011), Blu-ray disc (August 17, 2011)
Morning Musume Concert Tour 2011 Haru: Aki Ai Believe ~Takahashi Ai Sotsugyou Kinen Special~	Label: Zetima; Takahashi Ai's Graduation Concert.; Format: DVD ( December 28, 2011), Blu-ray disc ( December 28, 2011)
Morning Musume Concert Tour 2011 Haru: ~Ultra Smart~ Niigaki Risa Mitsui Aika Sotsugyou Special	Label: Zetima; Niigaki Risa and Mitsui Aika's Graduation Concert.; Format: DVD ( August 29, 2012), Blu-ray disc (August 29, 2012)
Morning Musume Tanjou 15 Shuunen Kinen Concert Tour 2012 Aki ~Colorful Character~	Label: Zetima; Format: DVD (March 13, 2013), Blu-ray disc ( March 13, 2013)

=== Music videos ===
Title	Year	Director(s)	Ref.
"Ai no Tane"	1997	Hideta Takahata	
"Morning Coffee"	1998	Hideta Takahata	
"Summer Night Town"	1998	Hideta Takahata	
"Daite Hold on Me!"	1998	Hideta Takahata	
"Memory Seishun no Hikari"	1999	Hideta Takahata	
"Manatsu no Kousen"	1999	Hideta Takahata	
"Furusato"	1999	Hideta Takahata	
"Love Machine"	1999	Hideta Takahata	
"Koi no Dance Site"	2000	Hideta Takahata	
"Happy Summer Wedding"	2000	Tetsuo Inoue	
"I Wish"	2000	Mayumi Miyasaka	
"Renai Revolution 21"	2000	Takashi Tadokoro	
"The Peace!"	2001	Wataru Takeishi	
"Mr. Moonlight: Ai no Big Band"	2001	Wataru Takeishi	
"Souda! We're Alive"	2002	Wataru Takeishi	
"Morning Musume Single Medley: Hawaiian" (with Boo Takagi, Coconuts Musume, Miki Fujimoto, and Rika Ishii)	2002		
"Do It! Now"	2002	Wataru Takeishi	
"Koko ni Iruzee!"	2002	Hideo Kawatani	
"Ganbacchae!"	2003	Hideo Kawatani	
"Morning Musume no Hyokkori Hyoutanjima"	2003	Hideo Kawatani	
"Hey! Mirai"	2003	Kensuke Kawamura	
"As for One Day"	2003	Wataru Takeishi	
"Shabondama"	2003	Wataru Takeishi	
"Go Girl (Koi no Victory)"	2003	Hideo Kawatani	
"Ai Araba It's All Right"	2004	Takeshi Sueda	
"Roman (My Dear Boy)"	2004	Tetsuo Inoue	
"Joshi Kashimashi Monogatari"	2004	Wataru Takeishi	
"Namida ga Tomaranai Hōkago"	2004	Wataru Takeishi	
"The Manpower"	2005	Wataru Takeishi	
"Osaka Koi no Uta"	2005	Wataru Takeishi	
"Iroppoi Jirettai"	2005	Makoto Hasegawa	
"Chokkan 2 (Nogashita Sakana wa Oukiizo!)"	2005	Makoto Hasegawa	
"Koi wa Hassou Do the Hustle!"	2005	Makoto Hasegawa	
"Sexy Boy (Soyokaze ni Yorisotte)"	2006	Makoto Hasegawa	
"Ambitious! Yashinteki de Ii Jan"	2006	Wataru Takeishi	
"Aruiteru"	2006	Hideo Kawatani	
"Egao Yes Nude"	2007	Hideo Kawatani	
"Kanashimi Twilight"	2007	Makoto Hasegawa	
"Onna ni Sachi Are"	2007	Makoto Hasegawa	
"Mikan"	2007	Makoto Hasegawa	
"Resonant Blue"	2008	Makoto Hasegawa	
"Pepper Keibu"	2008	Takashi Tadokoro	
"Naichau Kamo"	2009	Hideo Kawatani	
"Shouganai Yume Oibito"	2009	Toshiyuki Suzuki	
"3, 2, 1 Breakin' Out"	2009	Masaki Takehisa	
"Nanchatte Renai"	2009		
"Kimagure Princess"	2009	Toshiyuki Suzuki	
"Onna ga Medatte Naze Ikenai"	2010		
"Genki PikaPika"	2010		
"Seishun Collection"	2010	Hideaki Sunaga	
"Onna to Otoko no Lullaby Game"	2010	Tsuyoshi Inoue	
"Maji Desu ka Ska!"	2011	Takatoshi Uchiya	
"Only you"	2011	Masaharu Kitahira	
"Kono Chikyuu no Heiwa wo Honki de Negatterun da yo! / Kare to Issho ni Omise ga Shitai"	2011	Masaki Takehisa	
"Pyoco Pyoco Ultra"	2012	Masaki Takehisa	
"Renai Hunter"	2012	Shin Hasegawa	
"One Two Three"	2012	Hiroshi Mashima	
"The Matenrou Show" (Dance Shot)	2012		
"Wakuteka Take a Chance"	2012		
"Help Me!"	2013	Takeki Kitajima	
"Brainstorming"	2013		
"Don't want anything but you"	2013		
"Selfish, easy going, Jokes of love"	2013		
"Gundan of the Love"	2013		
"You bright smile is like the sunshine"	2013		
"What Is Love?"	2014		
"No One Can Replace You"	2014		
"Beyond the time and space"	2014		
"Password Is 0"	2014		
"Tiki Bun"	2014		
"A looking back beauty"	2014		
"Right Here, Right Now"	2015		
"An Adolescent Boy is Crying"	2015		
"The Sunset After the Rain"	2015		
"Oh My Wish!"	2015		
"Sukatto My Heart"	2015		
"The courage to jump in right now"	2015		
"Endless Sky"	2015		
"The Cold Wind and Lonely Love"	2015		
"One and Only"	2015		
"In a corner of a city called Tokyo"	2016		
"The Vision"	2016		
"Ephemeral Saturday Night!"	2016		
"Sexy Cat's Speech"	2016		
"I’m Not Like That"	2016		
"Confront With Bare Nakedness"	2016		
"Morning Miso Soup"	2017		
"Brand New Morning"	2017		
"Jealousy Jealousy"	2017		
"Green Light of the Dreadnaught"	2017		
"You're Young Anyway!"	2017		
"Don't Bother Me, Here We Go!"	2017		
"Are you happy?"	2018		
"A gonna"	2018		
"Wandering Around Ginza"	2018		
"Because It's a Free Country"	2018		
"Youthful Night"	2019		
"Life blues"	2019		
"Mind & Body"	2020		
"LOVEpedia"	2020		
"Personal Relationships No way way"	2020		
"Evidence of a Pure Heart"	2020		
"Even Though I Just Want You to Hold Me Tight"	2020		
"Teenage Solution"	2021		
"I Want You To Tell Me It's Alright"	2021		
"Beat Planet"	2021		
"Chu Chu Chu Bokura no Mirai"	2022		
"Great Life, Never Been Better!"	2022		
"Swing Swing Paradise"	2022		
"Happy Birthday to Me!"	2022		
"Fantastic FEVER!"	2023		
"Wake-up Call (It's Time For Me To Wake Up)"	2023		
"Neverending Shine"	2023		
"Nandaka Sentimental na Toki no Uta"	2024		
"SaiKIYOU"	2024		
"Ki ni Naru Sono Ki no Uta"	2025		
"Akaruku Ii Ko"	2025		
"Teka HAPPY no HAPPY!"	2025		
"Watashi no Lamentazione"	2025		

== Video games ==
[January 11, 2001] Space Venus starring Morning Musume (PlayStation 2)

[February 12, 2004] Lilliput Ōkoku: Lillimoni to Issho-puni! (Game Boy Advance)
