= Best! Morning Musume 20th Anniversary =

Studio album by Morning Musume '19
- Released: March 20, 2019 (JP)
- Recorded: 2007–2019
- Genre: J-pop
- Label: Zetima
- Producer: Tsunku

Morning Musume '19 chronology
Hatachi no Morning Musume (2018)	Best! Morning Musume 20th Anniversary (2019)	16th ~That's J-POP~ (2021)

Singles from Best! Morning Musume 20th Anniversary
- 1. "Seishun Kozo ga Naiteiru / Yūgure wa Ameagari / Ima Koko Kara" Released: April 15, 2015; 2. "Oh My Wish! / Sukatto My Heart / Ima Sugu Tobikomu Yūki" Released: August 19, 2015; 3. "Tsumetai Kaze to Kataomoi / Endless Sky / One and Only" Released: December 29, 2015; 4. "Utakata Saturday Night! / The Vision / Tokyo to Iu Katasumi" Released: May 11, 2016; 5. "Sexy Cat no Enzetsu / Mukidashi de Mukiatte / Sō ja Nai" Released: November 23, 2016; 6. "Are You Happy? / A Gonna" Released: June 13, 2018; 7. "Furari Ginza / Jiyū na Kuni Dakara" Released: October 24, 2018

Best! Morning Musume 20th Anniversary (Japanese: ベスト！モーニング娘。20th Anniversary, Hepburn: Besuto! Mōningu Musume 20th anniversary) is a compilation album by Japanese idol girl group Morning Musume. It was the group's 8th compilation album and was released in Japan on March 20, 2019 with three versions: one regular edition and two limited editions. It includes members from their 2019 lineup as well as their "OG" alumni dating back 2007.

== Featured lineup ==
=== Morning Musume '19 ===
- 9th generation: Mizuki Fukumura, Erina Ikuta
- 10th generation: Ayumi Ishida, Masaki Sato
- 11th generation: Sakura Oda
- 12th generation: Miki Nonaka, Maria Makino, Akane Haga
- 13th generation: Kaede Kaga, Reina Yokoyama
- 14th generation: Chisaki Morito

=== Morning Musume OG ===
- 5th generation: Ai Takahashi, Risa Niigaki
- 6th generation: Eri Kamei, Sayumi Michishige, Reina Tanaka
- 7th generation: Koharu Kusumi
- 8th generation: Aika Mitsui, Junjun, Linlin
- 9th generation: Riho Sayashi, Kanon Suzuki
- 10th generation: Haruna Iikubo, Haruka Kudo
- 12th generation: Haruna Ogata

== Track listing ==
Regular Edition and Limited Edition A – Disc 1
No.	Title	Notes	Length
1.	"I surrender Ai Saredo Ai" (I surrender 愛されど愛)	Performed as Morning Musume '19	2:57
2.	"Koishite Mitakute" (恋してみたくて)	Performed as Morning Musume '18	4:30
3.	"Mikan" (みかん)	35th single as Morning Musume	4:25
4.	"Resonant Blue" (リゾナント ブルー)	36th single as Morning Musume	4:49
5.	"Pepper Keibu" (ペッパー警部)	37th single as Morning Musume	4:07
6.	"Naichau Kamo" (泣いちゃうかも)	38th single as Morning Musume	4:33
7.	"Shōganai Yume Oibito" (しょうがない 夢追い人)	39th single as Morning Musume	5:04
8.	"Nanchatte Ren'ai" (なんちゃって恋愛)	40th single as Morning Musume	4:21
9.	"Kimagure Princess" (気まぐれプリンセス)	41st single as Morning Musume	4:18
10.	"Onna ga Medatte Naze Ikenai" (女が目立って なぜイケナイ)	42nd single as Morning Musume	3:53
11.	"Seishun Collection" (青春コレクション)	43rd single as Morning Musume	4:40
12.	"Onna to Otoko no Lullaby Game" (女と男のララバイゲーム)	44th single as Morning Musume	4:36
13.	"Maji Desu ka Ska!" (まじですかスカ!)	45th single as Morning Musume	3:40
14.	"Only You" (Only you)	46th single as Morning Musume	5:16
15.	"Kono Chikyuu no Heiwa wo Honki de Negatterun dayo!" (この地球の平和を本気で願ってるんだよ！)	47th single as Morning Musume	5:10
16.	"Pyoco Pyoco Ultra" (ピョコピョコ ウルトラ)	48th single as Morning Musume	4:56
17.	"Ren'ai Hunter" (恋愛ハンター)	49th single as Morning Musume	4:44

Regular Edition and Limited Edition A – Disc 2
No.	Title	Notes	Length
1.	"One Two Three" (One・Two・Three)	50th single (first A-Side) as Morning Musume	4:25
2.	"Wakuteka Take a Chance" (ワクテカ Take a chance)	51st single as Morning Musume	4:39
3.	"Help Me!!" (Help me!!)	52nd single as Morning Musume	4:35
4.	"Brainstorming" (ブレインストーミング)	53rd single (first A-Side) as Morning Musume	4:09
5.	"Wagamama Ki no Mama Ai no Joke" (わがまま 気のまま 愛のジョーク)	54th single (first A-Side) as Morning Musume	4:12
6.	"What is LOVE?" (What is LOVE?)	55th single (third A-Side) as Morning Musume '14	3:12
7.	"Toki wo Koe Sora wo Koe" (時空を超え 宇宙を超え)	56th single (first A-Side) as Morning Musume '14	4:47
8.	"Tiki Bun" (TIKI BUN)	57th single (first A-Side) as Morning Musume '14	4:59
9.	"Seishun Kozo ga Naiteiru" (青春小僧が泣いている)	58th single (first A-Side) as Morning Musume '15	4:16
10.	"Oh My Wish!" (Oh my wish!)	59th single (first A-Side) as Morning Musume '15	4:27
11.	"Tsumetai Kaze to Kataomoi" (冷たい風と片思い)	60th single (first A-Side) as Morning Musume '15	4:30
12.	"Utakata Saturday Night!" (泡沫サタデーナイト!)	61st single (first A-Side) as Morning Musume '16	3:48
13.	"Sexy Cat no Enzetsu" (セクシーキャットの演説)	62nd single (first A-Side) as Morning Musume '16	4:55
14.	"Jealousy Jealousy" (ジェラシー ジェラシー)	63rd single (second A-Side) as Morning Musume '17	4:34
15.	"Jama Shinaide Here We Go!" (邪魔しないで Here We Go！)	64th single (first A-Side) as Morning Musume '17	4:32
16.	"Are You Happy?" (Are you Happy?)	65th single (first A-Side) as Morning Musume '18	4:16
17.	"Furari Ginza" (フラリ銀座)	66th single (first A-Side) as Morning Musume '18	4:00

Limited Edition A – rockin'on presents ROCK IN JAPAN FESTIVAL 2018 (Disc 3)
No.	Title	Length
1.	"Opening" (OPENING)	0:50
2.	"How Do You Like Japan? ~Nihon wa Donna Kanji Dekka?~" (HOW DO YOU LIKE JAPAN？～日本はどんな感じでっか？～)	4:39
3.	"Ren'ai Revolution 21 (updated)" (恋愛レボリュ－ション21(updated))	3:20
4.	"Utakata Saturday Night!" (泡沫サタデーナイト！)	2:51
5.	"MC"	0:34
6.	"Jealousy Jealousy" (ジェラシー ジェラシー)	3:11
7.	"One Two Three (updated)" (One･Two･Three (updated))	2:50
8.	"Help Me!!(updated)" (Help me!! (updated))	3:00
9.	"Are You Happy?" (Are you Happy?)	4:18
10.	"Ai no Gundan" (愛の軍団)	3:21
11.	"Wagamama Ki no Mama Ai no Joke" (わがまま 気のまま 愛のジョーク)	2:55
12.	"What is Love?" (What is LOVE?)	3:10
13.	"MC"	0:22
14.	"Love Machine" (LOVEマシ－ン (updated))	5:35

Limited Edition A – Bonus Footage (Disc 3)
No.	Title	Length
1.	"Morning Musume 20th Anniversary VJ Remix."	12:58
2.	"I surrender Ai Saredo Ai (Music Video)" (I surrender 愛されど愛 (Music Video))	3:00
3.	"Jacket Satsuei Making Eizou" (ジャケット撮影メイキング映像)	20:07

Limited Edition B – Disc 1
No.	Title	Notes	Length
1.	"Mikan" (みかん)	35th single as Morning Musume	4:25
2.	"Resonant Blue" (リゾナント ブルー)	36th single as Morning Musume	4:49
3.	"Pepper Keibu" (ペッパー警部)	37th single as Morning Musume	4:07
4.	"Naichau Kamo" (泣いちゃうかも)	38th single as Morning Musume	4:33
5.	"Shōganai Yume Oibito" (しょうがない 夢追い人)	39th single as Morning Musume	5:04
6.	"Nanchatte Ren'ai" (なんちゃって恋愛)	40th single as Morning Musume	4:21
7.	"Kimagure Princess" (気まぐれプリンセス)	41st single as Morning Musume	4:18
8.	"Onna ga Medatte Naze Ikenai" (女が目立って なぜイケナイ)	42nd single as Morning Musume	3:53
9.	"Seishun Collection" (青春コレクション)	43rd single as Morning Musume	4:40
10.	"Onna to Otoko no Lullaby Game" (女と男のララバイゲーム)	44th single as Morning Musume	4:36
11.	"Maji Desu ka Ska!" (まじですかスカ!)	45th single as Morning Musume	3:40
12.	"Only You" (Only you)	46th single as Morning Musume	5:16
13.	"Kono Chikyuu no Heiwa wo Honki de Negatterun dayo!" (この地球の平和を本気で願ってるんだよ！)	47th single as Morning Musume	5:01
14.	"Kare to Issho ni Omise ga Shitai!" (彼と一緒にお店がしたい！)	47th single (B-Side) as Morning Musume	4:49
15.	"Pyoco Pyoco Ultra" (ピョコピョコ ウルトラ)	48th single as Morning Musume	4:56
16.	"Ren'ai Hunter" (恋愛ハンター)	49th single as Morning Musume	4:44

Limited Edition B – Disc 2
No.	Title	Notes	Length
1.	"One Two Three" (One・Two・Three)	50th single (first A-Side) as Morning Musume	4:25
2.	"The Matenrou Show" (The 摩天楼ショー)	50th single (second A-Side) as Morning Musume	5:16
3.	"Wakuteka Take a Chance" (ワクテカ Take a chance)	51st single as Morning Musume	4:39
4.	"Help Me!!" (Help me!!)	52nd single as Morning Musume	4:35
5.	"Brainstorming" (ブレインストーミング)	53rd single (first A-Side) as Morning Musume	4:09
6.	"Kimi Sae Ireba Nani mo Iranai" (君さえ居れば何も要らない)	53rd single (second A-Side) as Morning Musume	4:28
7.	"Wagamama Ki no Mama Ai no Joke" (わがまま 気のまま 愛のジョーク)	54th single (first A-Side) as Morning Musume	4:12
8.	"Ai no Gundan" (愛の軍団)	54th single (second A-Side) as Morning Musume	4:40
9.	"Egao no Kimi wa Taiyō sa" (笑顔の君は太陽さ)	55th single (fist A-Side) as Morning Musume '14	4:34
10.	"Kimi no Kawari wa Iyashinai" (君の代わりは居やしない)	55th single (second A-Side) as Morning Musume '14	4:29
11.	"What is Love?" (What is LOVE?)	55th single (third A-Side) as Morning Musume '14	3:12
12.	"Toki eo Koe Sora wo Koe" (時空を超え 宇宙を超え)	56th single (first A-Side) as Morning Musume '14	4:47
13.	"Password is 0"	56th single (second A-Side) as Morning Musume '14	4:31
14.	"Tiki Bun" (TIKI BUN)	57th single (first A-Side) as Morning Musume '14	4:59
15.	"Shabadaba Dū" (シャバダバ ドゥ～)	57th single (second A-Side) as Morning Musume '14	4:01
16.	"Mikaeri Bijin" (見返り美人)	57th single (third A-Side) as Morning Musume '14	4:54

Limited Edition B – Disc 3
No.	Title	Notes	Length
1.	"Seishun Kozo ga Naiteiru" (青春小僧が泣いている)	58th single (first A-Side) as Morning Musume '15	4:16
2.	"Yuugure wa Ameagari" (夕暮れは雨上がり)	58th single (second A-Side) as Morning Musume '15	4:19
3.	"Ima Koko Kara" (イマココカラ)	58th single (third A-Side) as Morning Musume '15	3:13
4.	"Oh My Wish!" (Oh my wish!)	59th single (first A-Side) as Morning Musume '15	4:27
5.	"Sukatto My Heart" (スカッとMy Heart)	59th single (second A-Side) as Morning Musume '15	4:05
6.	"Ima Sugu Tobikomu Yuuki" (今すぐ飛び込む勇気)	59th single (third A-Side) as Morning Musume '15	4:35
7.	"Tsumetai Kaze to Kataomoi" (冷たい風と片思い)	60th single (first A-Side) as Morning Musume '15	4:30
8.	"Endless Sky" (ENDLESS SKY)	60th single (second A-Side) as Morning Musume '15	5:01
9.	"One and Only"	60th single (third A-Side) as Morning Musume '15	4:45
10.	"Utakata Saturday Night!" (泡沫サタデーナイト!)	61st single (first A-Side) as Morning Musume '16	3:48
11.	"The Vision"	61st single (second A-Side) as Morning Musume '16	5:27
12.	"Tokyo to iu Katasumi" (Tokyoという片隅)	61st single (third A-Side) as Morning Musume '16	4:33
13.	"Sexy Cat no Enzetsu" (セクシーキャットの演説)	62nd single (first A-Side) as Morning Musume '16	4:55
14.	"Mukidashi de Mukiatte" (ムキダシで向き合って)	62nd single (second A-Side) as Morning Musume '16	3:49
15.	"Sou ja Nai" (そうじゃない)	62nd single (third A-Side) as Morning Musume '16	4:42

Limited Edition B – Disc 4
No.	Title	Notes	Length
1.	"Brand New Morning" (BRAND NEW MORNING)	63rd single (first A-Side) as Morning Musume '17	4:18
2.	"Jealousy Jealousy" (ジェラシー ジェラシー)	63rd single (second A-Side) as Morning Musume '17	4:34
3.	"Morning Misoshiru" (モーニングみそ汁)	63rd single (B-Side) as Morning Musume '17	4:30
4.	"Jama Shinaide Here We Go!" (邪魔しないで Here We Go!)	64th single (first A-Side) as Morning Musume '17	4:32
5.	"Dokyuu no Go Sign" (弩級のゴーサイン)	64th single (second A-Side) as Morning Musume '17	3:47
6.	"Wakainda shi!" (若いんだし!)	64th single (third A-Side) as Morning Musume '17	5:09
7.	"Are You Happy?" (Are you Happy?)	65th single (first A-Side) as Morning Musume '18	4:16
8.	"A Gonna"	65th single (second A-Side) as Morning Musume '18	3:35
9.	"Furari Ginza" (フラリ銀座)	66th single (first A-Side) as Morning Musume '18	3:58
10.	"Jiyuu na Kuni Dakara" (自由な国だから)	66th single (second A-Side) as Morning Musume '18	5:00
11.	"Y Jiro no Tochuu" (Y字路の途中)	66th single (B-Side) as Morning Musume '18	5:13
12.	"Watashi no Nanni mo Wakacchanai (Morning Musume '15 Ver.)" (私のなんにもわかっちゃない (モーニング娘。'15 Ver.))	Album track as Morning Musume '15	4:53
13.	"Tsumetai Kaze to Kataomoi (Type B)" (冷たい風と片思い (TYPE B))	60th vinyl single (B-side) as Morning Musume '15	4:12
14.	"Akogare no Stress-free (Morning Musume '18 Ver.)" (憧れのStress-free (モーニング娘。'18 Ver.))	Hello Pro All Stars single (second A-side) as Morning Musume '18	3:57
15.	"Jiyuu na Kuni Dakara (TV Edit)" (自由な国だから (TV EDIT))	66th single (second A-Side) as Morning Musume '18	2:31
16.	"Koishite Mitakute" (恋してみたくて)	Performed as Morning Musume '18	4:30
17.	"I surrender Ai Saredo Ai" (I surrender 愛されど愛)	Performed as Morning Musume '19	2:59

== Rank and Sales ==
Chart	Weekly Ranking	First Week Sales
Japan (Oricon Albums Chart)	1	34,345
Japan (Billboard Japan Top Albums Sales)	1	34,329
