= Hatachi no Morning Musume =

Studio album by Morning Musume 20th
- Released: February 7, 2018 (JP)
- Recorded: 2017–2018
- Genre: J-pop; electronica; EDM; dance-pop
- Label: Zetima
- Producer: Tsunku

Morning Musume 20th chronology
15 Thank You, Too (2017)	Hatachi no Morning Musume (2018)	Best! Morning Musume 20th Anniversary (2019)

Singles from Hatachi no Morning Musume
- 1. "Ai no Tane (20th Anniversary Ver.)" Released: November 3, 2017; 2. "Gosenfu no Tasuki" Released: November 30, 2017; 3. "Morning Coffee (20th Anniversary Ver.)" Released: January 28, 2018; 4. "Hana ga Saku Taiyō Abite" Released: January 28, 2018

Hatachi no Morning Musume (二十歳のモーニング娘。, Hatachi no Morning Musume; "20-Year-Old Morning Musume") is the second mini-album released by the Japanese girl group Morning Musume, under the name of their 20th anniversary group, Morning Musume 20th. It was released in Japan on February 7, 2018, with two versions: a limited CD+DVD edition and a regular CD-only edition.

== Featured lineup ==
=== Morning Musume 20th ===
- 1st generation: Yuko Nakazawa, Aya Ishiguro, Kaori Iida, Natsumi Abe, Asuka Fukuda
- 9th generation: Mizuki Fukumura, Erina Ikuta
- 10th generation: Haruna Iikubo, Ayumi Ishida, Masaki Sato
- 11th generation: Sakura Oda
- 12th generation: Haruna Ogata, Miki Nonaka, Maria Makino, Akane Haga
- 13th generation: Kaede Kaga, Reina Yokoyama
- 14th generation: Chisaki Morito

=== Morning Musume OG ===
- 2nd generation: Mari Yaguchi (track 2)
- 4th generation: Hitomi Yoshizawa (track 2), Nozomi Tsuji (DVD track 10)
- 5th generation: Ai Takahashi (track 2; DVD tracks 6, 7), Risa Niigaki (track 2)
- 6th generation: Miki Fujimoto (track 2), Sayumi Michishige (track 2; DVD tracks 6, 7, 9), Reina Tanaka (DVD tracks 6, 7)
- 10th generation: Haruka Kudo (track 7, 8; DVD tracks 6, 7, 10, 12, 13)

== Track listing ==
CD
No.	Title	Lyrics	Music	Arrangement	Length
1.	"Morning Coffee (20th Anniversary Ver.)" (モーニングコーヒー (20th Anniversary Ver.))	Tsunku	Tsunku	Shunsuke Suzuki	4:10
2.	"We Are Leaders! ~Rīdā tte no mo Tsurai Mono~" (WE ARE LEADERS! ～リーダーってのもつらいもの～) (Sung by: Morning Musume Leaders)	Kenichi Maeyamada	Kenichi Maeyamada	Yuichi Takahashi	4:28
3.	"Hana ga Saku Taiyō Abite" (花が咲く 太陽浴びて) (Sung by: Morning Musume '18)	Tsunku	Tsunku	Shoichiro Hirata	4:17
4.	"ENDLESS HOME" (Sung by: Natsumi Abe feat. Mizuki Fukumura, Sakura Oda)	Seiko Oomori	Seiko Oomori	Tomoki Kikuya	5:41
5.	"Otenki no Hi no Omatsuri" (お天気の日のお祭り) (Sung by: Morning Musume '18)	Tsunku	Tsunku	Yusuke Itagaki	4:31
6.	"Tane wa Tsubasa (Wings of the Seed)" (タネはツバサ (Wings of the Seed)) (Sung by: Yuko Nakazawa, Aya Ishiguro, Kaori Iida, Natsumi Abe, Asuka Fukuda)	Kenzo Saeki	Tetsutaro Sakurai	Shin Kono	4:12
7.	"Gosenfu no Tasuki" (五線譜のたすき) (Sung by: Morning Musume '17)	Ameko Kodama	Sho Hoshibe	Yuusuke Kato / Sho Hoshibe	4:28
8.	"Ai no Tane (20th Anniversary Ver.)" (愛の種 (20th Anniversary Ver.))	Kenzo Saeki	Tetsutaro Sakurai	Shunsuke Suzuki	4:10

Limited DVD
No.	Title	Length
1.	"Yuko Nakazawa interview"	5:47
2.	"Aya Ishiguro interview"	5:47
3.	"Kaori Iida interview"	5:38
4.	"Natsumi Abe interview"	5:56
5.	"Asuka Fukuda interview"	5:36
6.	"Shabondama (Morning Musume Tanjou 20 Shuunen Kinen Concert Tour 2017 Aki ~We are Morning Musume~ 2017/11/21 at Nippon Budokan)"	2:58
7.	"Resonant Blue (Morning Musume Tanjou 20 Shuunen Kinen Concert Tour 2017 Aki ~We are Morning Musume~ 2017/11/21 at Nippon Budokan)"	3:38
8.	"MC (Morning Musume Tanjou 20 Shuunen Kinen Concert Tour 2017 Aki ~We are Morning Musume~ 2017/11/21 at Nippon Budokan)"	1:20
9.	"Suki da na Kimi ga (Morning Musume Tanjou 20 Shuunen Kinen Concert Tour 2017 Aki ~We are Morning Musume~ 2017/11/21 at Nippon Budokan)"	3:33
10.	"Robokiss (Morning Musume Tanjou 20 Shuunen Kinen Concert Tour 2017 Aki ~We are Morning Musume~ 2017/11/21 at Nippon Budokan)"	3:19
11.	"MC (Morning Musume Tanjou 20 Shuunen Kinen Concert Tour 2017 Aki ~We are Morning Musume~ 2017/11/21 at Nippon Budokan)"	6:00
12.	"Ai no Tane (20th Anniversary Ver.) (Music Video)"	4:19
13.	"Gosenfu no Tasuki (Music Video)"	5:34

== Rank and Sales ==
Chart	Weekly Ranking	First Week Sales
Japan (Oricon Albums Chart)	1	47,607
Japan (Billboard Japan Top Albums Sales)	1	49,326
