= Seishun Kozo ga Naiteiru / Yūgure wa Ameagari / Ima Koko Kara =

"Seishun Kozo ga Naiteiru / Yuugure wa Ameagari / Ima Koko Kara"

Single by Morning Musume

from the album Best! Morning Musume 20th Anniversary
- Released: April 15, 2015 (Japan)
- Genre: J-pop; electronica
- Label: Zetima
- Songwriters: Tsunku; Kumiko Aoki

Morning Musume singles chronology
"Tiki Bun / Shabadaba Dū / Mikaeri Bijin" (2014)	"Seishun Kozo ga Naiteiru / Yuugure wa Ameagari / Ima Koko Kara" (2015)	"Oh My Wish! / Sukatto My Heart / Ima Sugu Tobikomu Yūki" (2015)

Music video
- Morning Musume "Ima Koko Kara" on YouTube

Seishun Kozo ga Naiteiru / Yūgure wa Ameagari / Ima Koko Kara (青春小僧が泣いている／夕暮れは雨上がり／イマココカラ, Seishun kozō ga naite iru/ Yūgure wa ameagari/ Ima koko kara) was the 58th single of the J-pop group Morning Musume. It is to be the first single released under the Morning Musume '15 name, scheduled for release on April 15, 2015.

== Tie-in with anime ==
Ima Koko Kara will be the first anime song performed by the group, to be used as the ending theme for the movie Pretty Cure All Stars: Spring Carnival. The song itself was first revealed during the second trailer for Pretty Cure All Stars: Spring Carnival, made public in late 2014. On February 10, 2015, Hello! Project confirmed the project and Morning Musume's involvement. Additionally, the ending dance of the film includes all 40 Pretty Cures alongside Morning Musume 15 and a selected group of young fans.

Three of the current members of the group: Haruna Iikubo, Ayumi Ishida, and Sakura Oda will voice three original characters in the film. The song marks the first Pretty Cure song performed by an artist outside of the franchise.

== Release details ==
On February 15, Hello!Project revealed the full single with Ima Koko Kara being its third A-Side track alongside two new songs Seishun Kozo ga Naiteiru and Yuugure wa Ameagari. It will be released in four limited CD+DVD editions and two regular CD only editions.

Because Suzuki Kanon was not completely healed from an ankle fracture, Miyamoto Karin from Juice=Juice was used as her substitute for the "Seishun Kozou ga Naiteiru" and "Yuugure wa Ameagari" music videos and promotion edits. It was previously thought she would only be featured in the dance shot, similar to when Ishida Ayumi replaced Miyamoto in the dance shot for Ijiwaru Shinai de Dakishimete. It was revealed on an early leak of Yuugure wa Ameagari and the Hello Project! Station versions of both songs that Miyamoto had been given close up shots in the full Promotion Edit (YouTube, Television ver.) and Music Video (Original ver. on the Limited Edition DVDs) as well while Suzuki was notably absent entirely. Suzuki was, however, present in the Another Ver. of Seishun Kozou ga Naiteiru. On the day of the single release, solo member commercials for "Seishun Kozou ga Naiteiru" were aired on screens in Shibuya featuring close-up scenes from the music video. An edition featuring Suzuki Kanon also aired, which has since created rumours for a new edit of the music video.

== Members at time of single ==
- 9th generation: Mizuki Fukumura, Erina Ikuta, Riho Sayashi, Kanon Suzuki
- 10th generation: Haruna Iikubo, Ayumi Ishida, Masaki Sato, Haruka Kudo
- 11th generation: Sakura Oda
- 12th generation (debut): Haruna Ogata, Miki Nonaka, Maria Makino, Akane Haga

== Track list ==
CD
No.	Title	Lyrics	Arrangement	Length
1.	"Seishun Kozo ga Naiteiru" (青春小僧が泣いている (lit. The Young, Crying Boy))	Tsunku		4:18
2.	"Yuugure wa Ameagari" (夕暮れは雨上がり (lit. Twilight After the Rain))	Tsunku		4:20
3.	"Ima Koko Kara" (イマココカラ (lit. Starting From Here))	Kumiko Aoki	Hideaki Takatori	3:15
4.	"Seishun Kozo ga Naiteiru (Instrumental)"			4:17
5.	"Yuugure wa Ameagari (Instrumental)"			4:19
6.	"Ima Koko Kara (Instrumental)"		Hideaki Takatori	3:15

Limited Edition A DVD
No.	Title	Length
1.	"Seishun Kozo ga Naiteiru (Music Video)"

Limited Edition B DVD
No.	Title	Length
1.	"Yuugure wa Ameagari (Music Video)"

Limited Edition C DVD
No.	Title	Length
1.	"Ima Koko Kara (Music Video)"

Limited Edition D DVD
No.	Title	Length
1.	"Seishun Kozo ga Naiteiru (Dance Shot Ver.)"
2.	"Seishun Kozo ga Naiteiru and Yuugure wa Ameagari (Making-of)"

== See also ==
- Pretty Cure All Stars
