= Are You Happy? / A Gonna =

"Are you Happy? / A gonna"

Single by Morning Musume '18

from the album Best! Morning Musume 20th Anniversary
- Released: June 13, 2018 (Japan)
- Genre: J-pop; electronica; EDM
- Label: Zetima

Morning Musume '18 singles chronology
"Jama Shinaide Here We Go! / Dokyū no Go Sign / Wakaindashi!" (2017)	"Are you Happy? / A gonna" (2018)	"Furari Ginza / Jiyū na Kuni Dakara" (2018)

"Are you Happy? / A gonna" is the 65th single by the Japanese girl group Morning Musume and was released on June 13, 2018.

== Members at time of single ==
- 9th generation: Mizuki Fukumura, Erina Ikuta
- 10th generation: Haruna Iikubo, Ayumi Ishida, Masaki Sato
- 11th generation: Sakura Oda
- 12th generation: Haruna Ogata (last single), Miki Nonaka, Maria Makino, Akane Haga
- 13th generation: Kaede Kaga, Reina Yokoyama
- 14th generation: Chisaki Morito

== Background ==
On April 1, 2018, the song "A gonna" was first performed in "Hello! Project 20th Anniversary!! Hello! Project Hina Fest 2018: Morning Musume '18 Premium". Then on April 21, the song "Are you Happy?" was first performed in their Spring Concert "Morning Musume Tanjou 20 Shuunen Kinen Concert Tour 2018 Haru ~We are MORNING MUSUME~" in Shizuoka. On May 5, both songs were finally announced as their 65th single. Since before that day, they were never mentioned to be their new single.

This also became Haruna Ogata's last single since she announced her graduation back in late March. Her graduation ceremony took place at the end of their tour on June 20.

== Release ==
It is a double A-side single.

The single is released in five versions: 2 CD-only regular editions and 3 CD+DVD limited editions. The first press of both regular editions comes with a trading card, randomly selected from two sets of 14 (for a total of 28 trading cards). The limited edition SP includes a lottery card to win a ticket to one of special events held by the group.

== Track listings ==
=== CD ===
All lyrics are written by Tsunku; all music is composed by Tsunku.

All editions
No.	Title	Arrangement	Length
1.	"Are you Happy?"	Shoichiro Hirata	4:17
2.	"A gonna"	Kaoru Okubo	3:35
3.	"Are you Happy? (Instrumental)"	Hirata	4:16
4.	"A gonna (Instrumental)"	Okubo	3:37

Limited Edition A DVD
No.	Title	Length
1.	"Are you Happy?" (Music Video)	5:16

Limited Edition B DVD
No.	Title	Length
1.	"A gonna" (Music Video)	4:16

Limited Edition SP DVD
No.	Title	Length
1.	"Are you Happy?" (Dance Shot Ver.)	4:24
2.	"A gonna" (Dance Shot Ver.)	3:46
3.	"Are you Happy?" (MV Satsuei Making Eizō)	13:46

== Rank and sales ==
Chart	Peak position	First week sales	Total sales
Japan (Oricon Singles Chart)	1	114,105	123,813
Japan (Billboard JAPAN Hot 100)	1	14,510 pts	
Japan (Billboard JAPAN Top Singles Sales)	1	156,458	
