= Utakata Saturday Night! / The Vision / Tokyo to Iu Katasumi =

Single by Morning Musume '16

from the album Best! Morning Musume 20th Anniversary
- Released: May 11, 2016 (Japan)
- Genre: J-pop; disco; electronica; electronic rock
- Label: Zetima

Morning Musume '16 singles chronology
"Tsumetai Kaze to Kataomoi / Endless Sky / One and Only" (2015)	"Utakata Saturday Night! / The Vision / Tokyo to Iu Katasumi" (2016)	"Sexy Cat no Enzetsu / Mukidashi de Mukiatte / Sou Janai" (2016)

"Utakata Saturday Night! / The Vision / Tokyo to Iu Katasumi" (泡沫サタデーナイト!／The Vision／Tokyoという片隅) is the 61st single of the Japanese group Morning Musume. It is the last single to feature 9th Generation member, Kanon Suzuki. It was released on May 11, 2016.

== Background ==
This triple A-Side single was announced on March 12 during the first night of "Morning Musume '16 Concert Tour Haru ~EMOTION IN MOTION~. Although no titles were announced, "Tokyo to Iu Katasumi" was performed on the same night of the announcement. Two days later, the titles were announced via their Official website citing the temporary title as "Tokyo to Iu Katasumi / The Vision / Utakata Saturday Night! (Temporary) (Order undecided)".

On April 6, the official order of songs was announced. The first and last title was switched, with no changes on all three titles. Their producer, Tsunku, also posted his comments regarding the latter two songs. He revealed that he wrote "The Vision" about people having a vision of a beautiful future. Subsequently, "The Vision" was performed for the first time on that same weekend.

== Release details ==
The single was released in six versions: 3 CD-only regular editions and 3 CD+DVD limited editions. The first press regular editions come with a random trading card of 13 kinds depending on the jacket, which is 39 in total. The limited editions instead include an event lottery serial number card.

== Members at time of single ==
- 9th generation: Mizuki Fukumura, Erina Ikuta, Kanon Suzuki (last single)
- 10th generation: Haruna Iikubo, Ayumi Ishida, Masaki Sato, Haruka Kudo
- 11th generation: Sakura Oda
- 12th generation: Haruna Ogata, Miki Nonaka, Maria Makino, Akane Haga

== Track listing ==
All Editions
No.	Title	Lyrics	Arrangement	Length
1.	"Utakata Saturday Night!" (泡沫サタデーナイト! (lit. Ephemeral Saturday Night!))	Maisa Tsuno	Shunsuke Suzuki	3:51
2.	"The Vision"	Tsunku	Kaoru Okubo	5:31
3.	"Tokyo to Iu Katasumi" (Tokyoという片隅 (lit. In a Corner of a City called Tokyo))	Tsunku	Kaoru Okubo	4:37
4.	"Utakata Saturday Night" (Instrumental)			3:51
5.	"The Vision" (Instrumental)			5:31
6.	"Tokyo to Iu Katasumi" (Instrumental)			4:35

Limited Edition A DVD
No.	Title	Length
1.	"Utakata Saturday Night!" (Music Video)

Limited Edition B DVD
No.	Title	Length
1.	"The Vision" (Music Video)

Limited Edition C DVD
No.	Title	Length
1.	"Tokyo to Iu Katasumi" (Music Video)
