= Tsumetai Kaze to Kataomoi / Endless Sky / One and Only =

Single by Morning Musume '15

from the album Best! Morning Musume 20th Anniversary
- Released: December 29, 2015 (Japan)
- Genre: J-pop; electronica
- Label: Zetima

Morning Musume '15 singles chronology
"Oh My Wish! / Sukatto My Heart / Ima Sugu Tobikomu Yūki" (2015)	"Tsumetai Kaze to Kataomoi / Endless Sky / One and Only" (2015)	"Utakata Saturday Night! / The Vision / Tokyo to Iu Katasumi" (2016)

"Tsumetai Kaze to Kataomoi / Endless Sky / One and Only" (冷たい風と片思い／ENDLESS SKY／One and Only) is the 60th single of the Japanese group Morning Musume. It was released on December 29, 2015.

== Background ==
"Tsumetai Kaze to Kataomoi / Endless Sky / One and Only" was announced on November 7 during their Morning Musume '15 Concert Tour Aki ~PRISM~ shortly before, 9th Generation member, Sayashi Riho announced her graduation. Hence, this is the last single by the group to feature her.

"One and Only" is the opening theme for NHK WORLD's J-MELO from October 2015 through March 2016 and it is sung completely in English, a first for the group.

Track list speculation quickly rose that Sayashi Riho will have a solo A-Side song and the comeback of a B-Side song, which was last seen on Wagamama Ki no Mama Ai no Joke / Ai no Gundan

=== Triple A-side speculated track list ===
1. One and Only
2. Watashi no Nanni mo Wakacchanai (Unreleased song from the PRISM tour)
3. BRAVE no Kamisama ~Zenshinzenrei~ (Riho Solo)
4. Naishobanashi (B-Side)

On December 7, producer Tsunku blogged about the liner notes of the single. He mentioned that "Tsumetai Kaze to Kataomoi" was intended to be the Sayashi Riho solo, but later changed into a group song. For "Endless Sky", it is a song for future members who will decide to graduate and not have regrets on the path they've chosen and look forward to their next challenges in life. On the last part of the blog, he posted the Japanese version of the song "One and Only".

== Release details and chart performance ==
The single was released in six versions: 3 CD-only regular editions and 3 CD+DVD limited editions. The first press regular editions come with a random trading card of 14 kinds depending on the jacket, which is 42 in total. The limited editions instead include an event lottery serial number card.

On December 28, 2015, the single charted on the Top Spot in the Oricon Daily chart. It fluctuated throughout the Oricon Year-end break week from the Top Spot to going as low as the 8th Spot on January 4, 2016. Then on January 5, 2016, Oricon announced that the Single claimed the Top Spot for the first week of 2016 with an estimated sales of 143,000 copies sold.

On February 5, 2016, it was announced that a vinyl version of the single would be released in March as a limited edition webshop item, including a new recording of "Tsumetai Kaze to Kataomoi". On April 1, it was opened for preorder in standard record shops for a May reprinting.

== Members at time of single ==
- 9th generation: Mizuki Fukumura, Erina Ikuta, Riho Sayashi (last single), Kanon Suzuki
- 10th generation: Haruna Iikubo, Ayumi Ishida, Masaki Sato, Haruka Kudo
- 11th generation: Sakura Oda
- 12th generation: Haruna Ogata, Miki Nonaka, Maria Makino, Akane Haga

== Track listings ==
=== CD and CD/DVD ===
All Editions
No.	Title	Lyrics	Arrangement	Length
1.	"Tsumetai Kaze to Kataomoi" (冷たい風と片思い (lit. A Cold Wind and an Unrequited Love))	Tsunku	Okubo Kaoru	4:30
2.	"Endless Sky" (ENDLESS SKY)	Tsunku	Shoichiro Hirata	5:01
3.	"One and Only"	Tsunku / ALISA (English Translation)	Shoichiro Hirata	4:45
4.	"Tsumetai Kaze to Kataomoi (Instrumental)"			4:29
5.	"Endless Sky (Instrumental)"			5:01
6.	"One and Only (Instrumental)"			4:48

Limited Edition A DVD
No.	Title	Length
1.	"Tsumetai Kaze to Kataomoi (Music Video)"

Limited Edition B DVD
No.	Title	Length
1.	"Endless Sky (Music Video)"

Limited Edition C DVD
No.	Title	Length
1.	"One and Only (Music Video)"

=== Vinyl ===
Side A
No.	Title	Lyrics	Arrangement	Length
1.	"Tsumetai Kaze to Kataomoi" (冷たい風と片思い (lit. A Cold Wind and an Unrequited Love))	Tsunku	Okubo Kaoru	4:30
2.	"Endless Sky" (ENDLESS SKY)	Tsunku	Shoichiro Hirata	5:01

Side B
No.	Title	Lyrics	Arrangement	Length
1.	"One and Only"	Tsunku / ALISA (English Translation)	Shoichiro Hirata	4:45
2.	"Tsumetai Kaze to Kataomoi (TYPE B)" (冷たい風と片思い (lit. A Cold Wind and an Unrequited Love))	Tsunku	Okubo Kaoru	4:08
