= Professionals-17th =

Studio album by Morning Musume '24
- Released: November 27, 2024 (JP)
- Recorded: 2024
- Genre: J-pop
- Label: Zetima
- Producer: Tsunku

Morning Musume '24 chronology
| 16th: That's J-pop (2021) | Professionals-17th (2024) |

Singles from Professionals-17th
- 1. "Suggoi Fever! / Wake-Up Call (Mezameru Toki) / Neverending Shine" Released: October 25, 2023; 2. "Nanda ka Sentimental na Toki no Uta / SaiKIYOU" Released: August 14, 2024

Professionals-17th is the 17th studio album by the Japanese idol group Morning Musume '24. Released in Japan on 27 November 2024, it debuted at number 4 on the Oricon albums chart.

== Background ==
It is first album to feature 16th and 17th generation members Rio Sakurai, Haruka Inoue and Ako Yumigeta and it is the last album to feature Erina Ikuta, Ayumi Ishida, Sakura Oda, Akane Haga, Maria Makino, Reina Yokoyama and Rio Kitagawa.

Mizuki Fukumura is uncredited in the album but her vocals can be heard in tracks #5, #9 and #11.

== Featured lineup ==
9th Generation: Erina Ikuta (Last album)

10th Generation: Ayumi Ishida (Last album)

11th Generation: Sakura Oda (Last album)

12th Generation: Miki Nonaka, Maria Makino (last album), Akane Haga (Last album)

13th Generation: Reina Yokoyama (Last album)

15th Generation: Rio Kitagawa (Last album), Homare Okamura, Mei Yamazaki

16th Generation: Rio Sakurai (debut album)

17th Generation: Haruka Inoue, Ako Yumigeta (debut album)

== Track listing ==
All tracks are written by Tsunku except for track #11 and #12.

   1. Yuukan na Dance – 4:39
   2. Occhokochoi na Fantasia Romance – Kitagawa Rio, Okamura Homare, Yamazaki Mei – 4:19
   3. Koibito – 4:13
   4. Mikasuki! – 4:14
   5. Suggoi Fever – 4:37
   6. Naisho da yo – Oda Sakura, Haga Akane – 4:19
   7. Nandanka Sentimental na Toki no Uta – 4:49
   8. Aete Yokatta – Yokoyama Reina, Inoue Haruka – 3:35
   9. Neverending Shine feat. Fukumura Mizuki – 4:37
   10. Shiawase Shisuu Happyou Saretai – Ikuta Erina, Ishida Ayumi, Nonaka Miki, Makino Maria, Sakurai Rio, Yumigeta Ako – 5:03
   11. Wake Up Call – Mezameru Toki – 4:16
   12. Saikiyou – 4:52
   13. Oozora ni Mukatte – 5:03
