= Jama Shinaide Here We Go! / Dokyū no Go Sign / Wakaindashi! =

Single by Morning Musume '17

from the album 15 Thank You, Too
- Released: October 4, 2017 (Japan)
- Genre: J-pop; electronica; EDM; pop punk; tropical house
- Label: Zetima

Morning Musume '17 singles chronology
"Brand New Morning / Jealousy Jealousy" (2017)	"Jama Shinaide Here We Go! / Dokyū no Go Sign / Wakaindashi!" (2017)	"Are You Happy? / A Gonna" (2018)

"Jama Shinaide Here We Go! / Dokyū no Go Sign / Wakaindashi!" (邪魔しないで Here We Go！／弩級のゴーサイン／若いんだし！) is the 64th single by the J-pop group Morning Musume and was released on October 4, 2017. It is expected to be the second time the group will release a single under the name Morning Musume '17.

== Members at time of single ==
- 9th generation: Mizuki Fukumura, Erina Ikuta
- 10th generation: Haruna Iikubo, Ayumi Ishida, Masaki Sato, Haruka Kudo (last single)
- 11th generation: Sakura Oda
- 12th generation: Haruna Ogata, Miki Nonaka, Maria Makino, Akane Haga
- 13th generation: Kaede Kaga, Reina Yokoyama
- 14th generation (debut): Chisaki Morito

== Background ==
It is the group's first single to feature its sole 14th generation member, Chisaki Morito. It is the last single to feature 10th generation member, Haruka Kudo. Also the return of 10th generation member, Masaki Sato, after recovering from her injury. And lastly, this single celebrates the group's 20th anniversary.

== Release ==
It is a triple A-side single.

The single is released in eight versions: 3 CD-only regular editions and 5 CD+DVD limited editions. The first press of all regular editions comes with a trading card, randomly selected from three sets of 15 (one set of 15 cards for each edition). The limited edition SP includes a lottery card to win a ticket to one of special events held by the group. And the Kudo Haruka (Morning Musume '17) edition is released and is only available via forTUNE music which holds a bonus L-sized photo of her.

== Track listings ==
=== CD ===
CD
No.	Title	Lyrics	Music	Arrangement	Length
1.	"Jama Shinaide Here We Go!" (邪魔しないで Here We Go！ (Don't Bother Me, Here We Go!))	Tsunku	Tsunku	Kaoru Okubo	4:34
2.	"Dokyū no Go Sign" (弩級のゴーサイン (Green Light of the Dreadnaught))	Ameko Kodama	Sho Hoshibe	Yocke	3:49
3.	"Wakaindashi!" (若いんだし！ (You're Young Anyway!))	Tsunku	Tsunku	Shoichiro Hirata	5:11
4.	"Jama Shinaide Here We Go! (Instrumental)"	Tsunku	Tsunku	Kaoru Okubo	4:35
5.	"Dokyū no Go Sign (Instrumental)"	Ameko Kodama	Sho Hoshibe	Yocke	3:49
6.	"Wakaindashi! (Instrumental)"	Tsunku	Tsunku	Shoichiro Hirata	5:12

Limited Edition A DVD
No.	Title	Length
1.	"Jama Shinaide Here We Go!" (Music Video)

Limited Edition B DVD
No.	Title	Length
1.	"Dokyū no Go Sign" (Music Video)

Limited Edition C DVD
No.	Title	Length
1.	"Wakaindashi!" (Music Video)

Limited Edition SP DVD
No.	Title	Length
1.	"Jama Shinaide Here We Go!" (Dance Shot ver.)
2.	"Dokyū no Go Sign" (Dance Shot ver.)
3.	"Wakaindashi!" (Dance Shot ver.)

Kudo Haruka (Morning Musume '17) Edition DVD
No.	Title	Length
1.	"Wakaindashi!" (Kudo Haruka Solo ver.)
2.	"Wakaindashi! (Satsuei Making Eizou)" (撮影メイキング映像)

== Charts and sales ==
Chart	Weekly ranking	First week sales	Total sales
Japan (Oricon Singles Chart)	2	111,049	118,588
Japan (Billboard Japan Hot 100)	1	178,024	189,322
