= Sexy Cat no Enzetsu / Mukidashi de Mukiatte / Sō ja Nai =

Single by Morning Musume '16

from the album Best! Morning Musume 20th Anniversary
- Released: November 23, 2016 (Japan)
- Genre: J-pop; disco; electronica; EDM; trance
- Label: Zetima

Morning Musume '16 singles chronology
"Utakata Saturday Night! / The Vision / Tokyo to Iu Katasumi" (2016)	"Sexy Cat no Enzetsu / Mukidashi de Mukiatte / Sō ja Nai" (2016)	"Brand New Morning / Jealousy Jealousy" (2017)

"Sexy Cat no Enzetsu / Mukidashi de Mukiatte / Sō ja Nai" (セクシーキャットの演説／ムキダシで向き合って／そうじゃない) is the 62nd single of the Japanese girl group Morning Musume. It was released on November 23, 2016.

== Release details ==
The single was released in six versions: 3 CD-only regular editions and 3 CD+DVD limited editions. The first press regular editions come with a random trading card of 12 kinds depending on the jacket, for a total of 36 cards. The limited editions instead include an event lottery serial number card.

== Charts ==
Chart (2016)	Peak position
Oricon Daily Singles Chart	1
Oricon Weekly Singles Chart	1
Billboard Japan Hot 100	2

== Members at time of single ==
- 9th generation: Mizuki Fukumura, Erina Ikuta
- 10th generation: Haruna Iikubo, Ayumi Ishida, Masaki Sato, Haruka Kudo
- 11th generation: Sakura Oda
- 12th generation: Haruna Ogata, Miki Nonaka, Maria Makino, Akane Haga

== Track listing ==
All Editions
No.	Title	Lyrics	Music	Arrangement	Length
1.	"Sexy Cat no Enzetsu" (セクシーキャットの演説 (lit. Sexy Cat's Speech))	Tsunku	Tsunku	Kaoru Okubo	4:55
2.	"Mukidashi de Mukiatte" (ムキダシで向き合って (lit. Confront With Bare Nakedness))	Hoshibe Shou	Jean Luc Ponpon & Hoshibe Shou	Jean Luc Ponpon	3:49
3.	"Sō ja Nai" (そうじゃない (lit. I'm Not Like That))	Tsunku	Tsunku	Shouichirou Hirata	4:40
4.	"Sexy Cat no Enzetsu (Instrumental)"				4:54
5.	"Mukidashi de Mukiatte (Instrumental)"				3:49
6.	"Sō ja Nai (Instrumental)"				4:42

Limited Edition A DVD
No.	Title	Length
1.	"Sexy Cat no Enzetsu (Music Video)"	5:30

Limited Edition B DVD
No.	Title	Length
1.	"Mukidashi de Mukiatte (Music Video)"	5:21

Limited Edition C DVD
No.	Title	Length
1.	"Sō ja Nai (Music Video)"	7:29
