= 16th: That's J-pop =

Studio album by Morning Musume '21
- Released: March 31, 2021 (JP)
- Recorded: 2021
- Genre: J-pop
- Label: Zetima
- Producer: Tsunku

Morning Musume '21 chronology
15 Thank You, Too (2017)	16th: That's J-pop (2021)	Professionals-17th (2024)

Singles from 16th: That's J-pop
- 1. "Jinsei Blues / Seishun Night" Released: June 12, 2019; 2. "Kokoro & Karada / Lovepedia / Ningen Kankei No Way Way" Released: January 22, 2020; 3. "Junjou Evidence / Gyuusaretai Dake na no ni" Released: December 16, 2020

16th: That's J-pop is the 16th studio album by the Japanese girl group Morning Musume '21. It was released in Japan on March 31, 2021.

== Background ==
It is the first album to feature 15th generation members Rio Kitagawa, Homare Okamura and Mei Yamazaki and the last album to feature 10th generation member Masaki Satō, 13th generation member Kaede Kaga, and 14th generation member Chisaki Morito.

The album was released in two versions: Limited Edition (CD+DVD) and Regular Edition (CD). The Limited Edition includes a Blu-ray recording of a no audience live titled "Morning Musume '21 Mukankyaku Secret Live", and an interview of the members talking about the album.

== Featured lineup ==
- 9th generation: Mizuki Fukumura, Erina Ikuta
- 10th generation: Ayumi Ishida, Masaki Sato
- 11th generation: Sakura Oda
- 12th generation: Miki Nonaka, Maria Makino, Akane Haga
- 13th generation: Kaede Kaga, Reina Yokoyama
- 14th generation: Chisaki Morito
- 15th generation: Rio Kitagawa, Homare Okamura, Mei Yamazaki

== Track listing ==
All tracks are written by Tsunku except #13 and #14.

CD
No.	Title	Lyrics	Music	Length
1.	"Aishite Nan ga Warui!?" (愛してナンが悪い！？)	Tsunku	Tsunku	3:35
2.	"Gyuu Saretai Dake na no ni" (ギューされたいだけなのに)	Tsunku	Tsunku	4:12
3.	"Shinjiru Shika" (信じるしか！) (Sung by: Erina Ikuta, Ayumi Ishida, Sakura Oda, Kaede Kaga, Chisaki Morito, Homare Okamura)	Tsunku	Tsunku	4:24
4.	"TIME IS MONEY!" (Sung by: Masaki Sato, Miki Nonaka, Reina Yokoyama, Mei Yamazaki)	Tsunku	Tsunku	3:31
5.	"Nakimushi My Dream" (泣き虫My Dream)	Tsunku	Tsunku	5:03
6.	"Futari wa Abekobe" (二人はアベコベ) (Sung by: Mizuki Fukumura, Maria Makino, Akane Haga, Rio Kitagawa)	Tsunku	Tsunku	3:42
7.	"Junjou Evidence" (純情エビデンス)	Tsunku	Tsunku	4:14
8.	"Kono Mama!" (このまま！)	Tsunku	Tsunku	4:04
9.	"KOKORO&KARADA"	Tsunku	Tsunku	4:40
10.	"Jinsei Blues" (人生Blues)	Tsunku	Tsunku	4:36
11.	"Hey! Unfair Baby"	Tsunku	Tsunku	4:50
12.	"Ren'ai Destiny ~Honne wo Ronjitai~" (恋愛Destiny～本音を論じたい～)	Tsunku	Tsunku	3:59
13.	"LOVEpedia" (人間関係No way way)	Kodama Ameko	Ooyagi Hiroo	5:09
14.	"Ningen Kankei No way way"	Kodama Ameko	Ooyagi Hiroo	4:57
15.	"Seishun Night" (青春Night)	Tsunku	Tsunku	4:21

Limited Blu-ray Disc
No.	Title	Length
1.	"Opening"
2.	"Junjou Evidence"
3.	"Seishun Night"
4.	"MC"
5.	"KOKORO&KARADA"
6.	"Jinsei Blues"
7.	"Gyuu Saretai Dake na no ni"
8.	"MC"
9.	"LOVEpedia"
10.	"Ningen Kankei No way way"
11.	"Hey! Unfair Baby"
12.	"Ren'ai Destiny ~Honne wo Ronjitai~"
13.	"Ending"

== Rank and sales ==
Chart	Weekly Ranking	First Week Sales
Japan (Oricon Albums Chart)	2	37,754
Japan (Billboard Japan Hot Albums chart)	2	39,546
