= Jean Luc Ponpon =

Songwriting and music production team

- Genres: Future bass; dubstep; EDM; dance; disco; post-disco; pop; rock; R&B; Electric blues
- Occupations: Record producer, songwriter
- Instruments: Guitar, Keyboard, bass, drum machine, sampler
- Years active: 2008–present Nicki Minaj, Justice, The Black Eyed Peas, Jane's Addiction, Peaches, Morning Musume
- Members: Daniel Merlot; Takanori Tsunoda; Stefan Broadley

Jean Luc Ponpon is an international songwriting and production team consisting of members Daniel Merlot, Takanori Tsunoda, and Stefan Breadley.

== Members ==
Daniel Merlot (also known as Crash Berlin) is the music director/keyboardist for Porcelain Black (Universal Records) produced by Red One (Lady Gaga's producer). He has recently been on a U.S./Canada 25-city tour with Lil Wayne and Nicki Minaj. He produces artists internationally and across Asia, and is the music director for Tokyo Girls Collection in China. He has had a long career as DJ, music producer, and musician, and has deejayed with Justice, Bjork, Peaches, Jane's Addiction, and Kool Keith.

Stefan Breadley started as an in-house audio engineer for 4th Street Recording Studios in 1998 by installing their Pro Tools system. Since then, he has expanded to production and mixing, and has worked with many of 4th Street's clients, including artists from Incubus, Prodigy, Seven Dust, Korn, and Black Eyed Peas. A vocal specialist, Breadley has experience recording, arranging, editing and mixing vocals. In his career he has worked with many types of media, and produced a broad range of music.

Daniel Merlot banded Jean Luc Ponpon in 2008.

== Production credits ==
=== Porcelain Black featuring Lil Wayne ===
- “This Is What Rock n' Roll Looks Like“

=== Perry Farrell (Lollapalooza / Jane’s Addiction) ===
- “KING Z“

=== SPICA ===
- “I Did it“

=== Shang Wenjie ===
- “IN“
- “Ode To The Doom“
- “back to the world“

=== Morning Musume ===
- "Mukidashi de Mukiatte“
- "Brand New Morning"

=== °C-ute ===
- The Middle Management“
- "Digitalic→0 (LOVE)“

=== VOGUE video ===
- “Fashion on demand: rock baby“
