= Brand New Morning / Jealousy Jealousy =

2017 single by Morning Musume

Single by Morning Musume '17

from the album 15 Thank You, Too
- Released: March 8, 2017 (Japan)
- Genre: J-pop; electronica; trance; nu-disco
- Label: Zetima

Morning Musume '17 singles chronology
"Sexy Cat no Enzetsu / Mukidashi de Mukiatte / Sō ja Nai" (2016)	"Brand New Morning / Jealousy Jealousy" (2017)	"Jama Shinaide Here We Go! / Dokyū no Go Sign / Wakaindashi!" (2017)

Music video
- "Morning Misoshiru" on YouTube

"Brand New Morning / Jealousy Jealousy" (BRAND NEW MORNING／ジェラシー ジェラシー) is the 63rd single by the J-pop group Morning Musume, was released on March 8, 2017. The group releases it under the name Morning Musume '17.

== Members at time of single ==
- 9th generation: Mizuki Fukumura, Erina Ikuta
- 10th generation: Haruna Iikubo, Ayumi Ishida, Masaki Sato (b-side only), Haruka Kudo
- 11th generation: Sakura Oda
- 12th generation: Haruna Ogata, Miki Nonaka, Maria Makino, Akane Haga
- 13th generation (debut): Kaede Kaga, Reina Yokoyama

== Background ==
It is the group's first single to feature its 13th generation members, Reina Yokoyama and Kaede Kaga.

Masaki Sato doesn't participate in the A-sides's as she is still on hiatus recovering from spinal disc herniation.

== Release ==
It is a double-A-side single.

The single is released in five versions: 2 CD-only regular editions and 3 CD+DVD limited editions. The first press of both regular editions comes with a trading card, randomly selected from two sets of 13 (one set of 13 cards for each edition). The limited editions instead of a trading card include a lottery card to win a ticket to one of special events held by the group.

=== SP Edition ===
The SP edition of the single includes two additional songs.

One of them, "Morning Misoshiru" ("Morning Miso Soup"), is a remake of the group's first major-label single "Morning Coffee", that appeared in 1998.

The other, "Get You!", is sung by a group called Sashining Musume, which consists of Morning Musume and Rino Sashihara (HKT48 member). The song's lyrics are penned by Yasushi Akimoto.

== Track listings ==
=== Limited Editions A and B, Regular Editions A and B ===
CD
No.	Title	Lyrics	Music	Length
1.	"Brand New Morning" (BRAND NEW MORNING)	Hoshibe Sho	Jean Luc Ponpon & Hoshibe Sho	4:18
2.	"Jealousy Jealousy" (ジェラシー ジェラシー)	Tsunku, rap arrangement by U.M.E.D.Y.	Tsunku	4:34
3.	"Brand New Morning" (Instrumental)			4:18
4.	"Jealousy Jealousy" (Instrumental)			4:34

Limited Edition A DVD
No.	Title	Length
1.	"Brand New Morning" (Music Video)

Limited Edition B DVD
No.	Title	Length
1.	"Jealousy Jealousy" (Music Video)

=== Limited Edition SP ===
CD
No.	Title	Lyrics	Music	Length
1.	"Brand New Morning" (BRAND NEW MORNING)			4:18
2.	"Jealousy Jealousy" (ジェラシー ジェラシー)			4:34
3.	"Morning Misoshiru" (モーニングみそ汁)	Tsunku	Tsunku
4.	"Get You!" (Get you! · sang by Sashining Musume (Morning Musume '17 & Rino Sashihara)	Yasushi Akimoto	Yūsuke Itagaki
5.	"Brand New Morning" (Instrumental)			4:18
6.	"Jealousy Jealousy" (Instrumental)			4:34

Limited Edition SP DVD
No.	Title	Length
1.	"Morning Misoshiru" (Music Video)
2.	"Brand New Morning" (Dance Shot Ver.)
3.	"Jealousy Jealousy" (Dance Shot Ver.)	4:18
