= 15 Thank You, Too =

Studio album by Morning Musume '17
- Released: December 6, 2017 (JP)
- Recorded: 2017
- Genre: J-pop; electronica; EDM; dance-pop
- Label: Zetima
- Producer: Tsunku

Morning Musume '17 chronology
14 Shō: The Message (2014)	15 Thank You, Too (2017)	16th ~That's J-POP~ (2021)

Singles from 15 Thank You, Too
- 1. "Brand New Morning / Jealousy Jealousy" Released: March 8, 2017; 2. "Jama Shinaide Here We Go! / Dokyū no Go Sign / Wakaindashi!" Released: October 4, 2017

15 Thank You, Too (stylized as ⑮ Thank you, too) is the 15th studio album by the Japanese girl group Morning Musume '17. It was released in Japan on December 6, 2017 with two versions: a limited CD+Blu-ray edition and a regular CD-only edition.

== Release details ==
The album was announced on October 21 in Hokkaido, during their 2017 Autumn Tour: "Morning Musume Tanjō 20 Shuunen Kinen Concert Tour 2017 Aki ~We are MORNING MUSUME~". Making this their first album in over 3 years and created their widest gap between studio albums.

On November 2, the official track list was released and revealed that only their two most recent singles were included. Leaving out five other singles released between 2015 and 2016. Nonetheless, the album includes 10 brand new tracks and 3 of which are: an unreleased song from 2015, a remake of their 23rd single and a self cover of their indies single with new arrangements.

This release also includes a limited edition Blu-ray recording of their 20th Anniversary Event held on September 14, 2017 in Shinkiba Studio Coast: "Morning Musume Kessei 20 Shuunen Kinen Event ~21 Nenme mo Ganbatte Ikimasshoi!~". The event featured surprise guests, Sayumi Michishige and Reina Tanaka (Morning Musume OG).

This is the first album to feature the 12th, 13th and 14th generations, the last album to feature 10th generation members, Haruka Kudo and Haruna Iikubo, and the only album to feature 12th generation member, Haruna Ogata.

== Featured lineup ==
=== Morning Musume '17 ===
- 9th generation: Mizuki Fukumura, Erina Ikuta
- 10th generation: Haruna Iikubo, Ayumi Ishida, Masaki Sato, Haruka Kudo (last album)
- 11th generation: Sakura Oda
- 12th generation: Haruna Ogata, Miki Nonaka, Maria Makino, Akane Haga
- 13th generation: Kaede Kaga, Reina Yokoyama
- 14th generation: Chisaki Morito

=== Morning Musume OG ===
- 6th generation (Blu-ray only): Sayumi Michishige, Reina Tanaka

== Track listing ==
CD
No.	Title	Lyrics	Music	Arrangement	Length
1.	"Jealousy Jealousy (Album Version)" (ジェラシー ジェラシー)	Tsunku, rap arrangement by U.M.E.D.Y.	Tsunku	Kaoru Okubo	4:35
2.	"Romance ni Mezameru Mousou Joshi no Uta" (ロマンスに目覚める妄想女子の歌)	Tsunku	Tsunku	Kaoru Okubo	4:41
3.	"CHO DAI"	Tsunku	Tsunku	Shoichiro Hirata	4:25
4.	"Watashi no Nanni mo Wakacchanai" (私のなんにもわかっちゃない)	Tsunku	Tsunku	Kaoru Okubo	4:53
5.	"Jama Shinai de Here We Go!" (邪魔しないで Here We Go！)	Tsunku	Tsunku	Kaoru Okubo	4:33
6.	"Style of my love" (Sung by: Haruna Iikubo, Sakura Oda, Maria Makino)	Tsunku	Tsunku	Kaoru Okubo	4:38
7.	"Narcissus Kamatte-chan Kyousoukyoku Dai 5ban" (ナルシス カマってちゃん協奏曲第5番)	Tsunku	Tsunku	Shoichiro Hirata	4:17
8.	"Seishun Say A-HA" (青春Say A-HA)	Tsunku	Tsunku	Kaoru Okubo	3:46
9.	"Wakaindashi!" (若いんだし！)	Tsunku	Tsunku	Shichiro Hirata	5:09
10.	"Mou Gaman Dekinai wa ~Love ice cream~" (もう 我慢できないわ〜Love ice cream〜) (Sung by: Haruna Ogata, Akane Haga, Kaede Kaga, Reina Yokoyama)	Tsunku	Tsunku	Shunsuke Suzuki	4:45
11.	"Dokyuu no Go Sign" (弩級のゴーサイン)	Ameko Kodama	Sho Hoshibe	Yocke	3:47
12.	"Koi wa Toki ni" (恋は時に) (Sung by: Mizuki Fukumura, Erina Ikuta, Ayumi Ishida, Masaki Sato, Haruka Kudo, Miki Nonaka, Chisaki Morito)	Tsunku	Tsunku	Kaoru Okubo	5:11
13.	"Joshi Kashimashi Monogatari (Morning Musume.'17 Ver.)" (女子かしまし物語(モーニング娘。'17 Ver.))	Tsunku	Tsunku	Hideyuki "Daichi" Suzuki	5:17
14.	"BRAND NEW MORNING"	Sho Hoshibe	Jean Luc Ponpon & Sho Hoshibe	Jean Luc Ponpon	4:18
15.	"Ai no Tane (20th Anniversary Ver.)" (愛の種(20th Anniversary Ver.) (Additional Track))	Kenzō Saeki	Sakurai Tetsutaro	Shunsuke Suzuki	4:09

Limited Blu-ray Disc
No.	Title	Length
1.	"Opening"
2.	"Morning Coffee"
3.	"MC"
4.	"KoiING"
5.	"MC"
6.	"I Wish (Updated)"
7.	"Shabondama"
8.	"Resonant Blue"
9.	"MC"
10.	"Daisuki Dakara Zettai ni Yurusanai" (Sung by Sakura Oda, Miki Nonaka)
11.	"Robo Kiss" (Sung by Masaki Sato, Haruka Kudo)
12.	"MC"
13.	"One Two Three (Updated)"
14.	"Fantasy ga Hajimaru"
15.	"Say Yeah! ~Motto Miracle Night~"
16.	"MC"
17.	"Ookii Hitomi" (Sung by Sayumi Michishige, Reina Tanaka)
18.	"MC"
19.	"Kare to Issho ni Omise ga Shitai!" (Sung by Morning Musume.'17, Sayumi Michishige, Reina Tanaka)
20.	"MC"
21.	"Jama Shinaide Here We Go!"
22.	"Wagamama Ki no Mama Ai no Joke"
23.	"What is Love?"
24.	"[Encore] VTR"
25.	"[Encore] Roman ~My Dear Boy~"
26.	"[Encore] MC"
27.	"[Encore] Love Machine (Updated)"
28.	"[Encore] Ending VTR"

== Rank and Sales ==
Chart	Weekly Ranking	First Week Sales
Japan (Oricon Albums Chart)	4	29,852
Japan (Billboard Japan Hot Albums chart)	5	27,605
