= Tiki Bun / Shabadaba Dū / Mikaeri Bijin =

Single by Morning Musume

from the album 14 Shō: The Message
- Released: October 15, 2014 (Japan)
- Genre: EDM; synthpop (Tiki Bun); Shibuya-kei (Shabadaba Dū); Enka (Mikaeri Bijin)
- Label: Zetima
- Songwriter: Tsunku
- Producer: Tsunku

Morning Musume singles chronology
"Toki o Koe Sora o Koe / Password is 0" (2014)	"Tiki Bun / Shabadaba Dū / Mikaeri Bijin" (2014)	"Seishun Kozo ga Naiteiru / Yūgure wa Ameagari / Ima Koko Kara" (2015)

Music video
- Morning Musume "Tiki Bun" on YouTube

"Tiki Bun / Shabadaba Dū / Mikaeri Bijin" (TIKI BUN／シャバダバ ドゥ～／見返り美人) is the 57th single by the J-pop group Morning Musume. It was released in Japan on October 15, 2014. It is the last single to feature Michishige Sayumi and also marks the final graduation of a member before the 9th generation.

== Details ==
"Tiki Bun / Shabadaba Dū / Mikaeri Bijin" is the second triple-A single by Morning Musume in the group's history.

It is going to be Morning Musume's last single with Sayumi Michishige as a member.

The very first live performance of the song "Tiki Bun" was at the Morning Musume 18th anniversary concert. The concert took place on September 14, 2014, at the Shinagawa Stellar Ball in Tokyo.

"Shabadaba Dū" is Sayumi Michishige's solo song. It was premiered on radio, at Michishige's own radio show.

"Mikaeri Bijin" is an enka song. It is the first original song (not a cover song) of the enka music genre in Morning Musume's history. It is performed by all Morning Musume members except Michishige: Mizuki Fukumura, Erina Ikuta, Riho Sayashi, Kanon Suzuki, Haruna Iikubo, Ayumi Ishida, Masaki Sato, Haruka Kudo and Sakura Oda.

All regular editions are CD-only, while all limited editions include a DVD that features a music video.

All limited editions include a card with a serial number that can be used to enter a lottery to win a ticket for a handshake event (a meeting with the group where fans line up to shake hands with the group members), while all regular editions come with a collectable photo (there are two sets of photos: one for the Regular Edition A and one for the Regular Edition B, each set has 11 different photos: one of each member and one of the entire group; in the set that comes with the Regular Edition A, members are dressed in the costumes for the song "Tiki Bun", and in the other set — in the costumes for "Mikaeri Bijin").

== Members at time of single ==
- 6th generation: Sayumi Michishige (last single)
- 9th generation: Mizuki Fukumura, Erina Ikuta, Riho Sayashi, Kanon Suzuki
- 10th generation: Haruna Iikubo, Ayumi Ishida, Masaki Sato, Haruka Kudo
- 11th generation: Sakura Oda

Tiki Bun Vocalists

Main Voc: Sayumi Michishige, Haruna Iikubo, Masaki Sato, Haruka Kudo

Minor Voc: Mizuki Fukumura, Erina Ikuta, Riho Sayashi, Kanon Suzuki, Ayumi Ishida, Sakura Oda

== Track listing ==
CD (all editions)
No.	Title	Lyrics	Music	Arrangement	Length
1.	"Tiki Bun" (TIKI BUN "Chiki Boom")	Tsunku	Tsunku	Kaoru Okubo	5:01
2.	"Shabadaba Dū" (シャバダバ ドゥ〜 "Shabadabadoo")	Tsunku	Tsunku	Nao Tanaka	4:04
3.	"Mikaeri Bijin" (見返り美人 "Looking Back Beauty" or "A Beauty Looking over Her Shoulder")	Shinichi Ishihara	Tetsuya Gen	Shunsuke Suzuki	4:55
4.	"Tiki Bun (Instrumental)"				5:02
5.	"Shabadaba Dū (Instrumental)"				4:04
6.	"Mikaeri Bijin (Instrumental)"				4:57

Limited Edition A DVD
No.	Title	Length
1.	"Tiki Bun (Music Video)"	6:19

Limited Edition B DVD
No.	Title	Length
1.	"Shabadaba Dū (Music Video)"	7:07

Limited Edition C DVD
No.	Title	Length
1.	"Mikaeri Bijin (Music Video)"	6:39

Limited Edition D DVD
No.	Title	Length
1.	"Tiki Bun (Dance Shot Ver.)"	05:07
2.	"Tiki Bun (Making-of)" (TIKI BUN (メイキング映像))	18:25
