= Egao no Kimi wa Taiyō sa / Kimi no Kawari wa Iyashinai / What is Love? =

"Egao no Kimi wa Taiyou sa / Kimi no Kawari wa Iyashinai / What is LOVE?"

Single by Morning Musume

from the album 14 Shō: The Message
- Released: January 29, 2014 (Japan)
- Genre: J-pop; R&B; electronica
- Label: Zetima

Morning Musume singles chronology
"Wagamama Ki no Mama Ai no Joke / Ai no Gundan" (2013)	"Egao no Kimi wa Taiyou sa / Kimi no Kawari wa Iyashinai / What is LOVE?" (2014)	"Toki o Koe Sora o Koe / Password is 0" (2014)

Music videos
- "Egao no Kimi wa Taiyou sa (MV)" on YouTube
- "WHAT IS LOVE? (MV)" on YouTube

Egao no Kimi wa Taiyou sa / Kimi no Kawari wa Iyashinai / What is LOVE? (Japanese 『笑顔の君は太陽さ／君の代わりは居やしない／What is LOVE?』) is Morning Musume's 55th single, and the first to be released under the name of Morning Musume '14. It was released on January 29, 2014, in 6 editions: 2 regular and 4 limited editions.

"Kimi no Kawari wa Iyashinai" will be the official cheer song for the 2014 Winter Olympics Japanese Team, while "What is LOVE?" was the ending theme for the NHK World show J-Melo from October through December 2013.

The music video for "Egao no Kimi wa Taiyou sa" was released on 25 December 2013 on Mezamashi TV at 6am (JST). The Music Video for "What is Love?" was released on 2 January 2014

The single debuted at number one on the Weekly Oricon Singles Chart.

== Track listings ==
=== CD (regular editions A and B, limited edition A, B, C and D) ===
1. Egao no Kimi wa Taiyou sa
2. Kimi no Kawari wa Iyashinai
3. What is LOVE?
4. Egao no Kimi wa Taiyou sa (instrumental)
5. Kimi no Kawari wa Iyashinai (instrumental)
6. What is LOVE? (instrumental)

=== DVD (limited edition A) ===
1. Egao no Kimi wa Taiyou sa (music video)
2. Egao no Kimi wa Taiyou sa (close-up ver.)

=== DVD (limited edition B) ===
1. Kimi no Kawari wa Iyashinai (music video)
2. Kimi no Kawari wa Iyashinai (dance shot ver.)

=== DVD (limited edition C) ===
1. What is LOVE? (music video)
2. What is LOVE? (dance shot ver.)

=== DVD (limited edition D) ===
1. Egao no Kimi wa Taiyou sa (dance lecture video)
2. Egao no Kimi wa Taiyou sa (dance shot ver.)
3. Egao no Kimi wa Taiyou sa / Kimi no Kawari wa Iyashinai (making-of and off shot video)

== Members at time of single ==
- 6th generation: Sayumi Michishige
- 9th generation: Mizuki Fukumura, Erina Ikuta, Riho Sayashi, Kanon Suzuki
- 10th generation: Haruna Iikubo, Ayumi Ishida, Masaki Sato, Haruka Kudo
- 11th generation: Sakura Oda

Egao no Kimi wa Taiyou sa Vocalists

Main Voc: Mizuki Fukumura, Riho Sayashi, Ayumi Ishida, Masaki Sato

Minor Voc: Sayumi Michishige, Erina Ikuta, Kanon Suzuki, Haruna Iikubo, Haruka Kudo, Sakura Oda

Kimi no Kawari wa Iyashinai Vocalists

Main Voc: Riho Sayashi, Sakura Oda

Center Voc: Mizuki Fukumura

Minor Voc: Sayumi Michishige, Erina Ikuta, Kanon Suzuki, Haruna Iikubo, Ayumi Ishida, Masaki Sato, Haruka Kudo

== Charts ==
=== Oricon charts ===
Singles chart	Peak position	Sales
Daily chart	1	
Weekly chart	1	149,361
