= 14 Shō: The Message =

Studio album by Morning Musume '14
- Released: October 29, 2014 (JP)
- Recorded: 2014
- Genres: J-pop; electronica; EDM; dance-pop
- Length: 50:32
- Label: Zetima
- Producer: Tsunku

Morning Musume '14 chronology
13 Colorful Character (2012)	14 Shō: The Message (2014)	15 Thank You, Too (2017)

Singles from 14 Shō: The Message
- 1. "Egao no Kimi wa Taiyō sa / Kimi no Kawari wa Iyashinai / What is Love?" Released: January 29, 2014; 2. "Toki o Koe Sora o Koe / Password is 0" Released: April 16, 2014; 3. "Tiki Bun" Released: October 15, 2014

14 Shō: The Message (14章～The message～; "Chapter 14: The Message") is the 14th studio album by the Japanese girl group Morning Musume '14. It was released in Japan on October 29, 2014.

== Release ==
The album's release and its title were announced at the Morning Musume 18th anniversary concert that took place on September 14, 2014, at the Shinagawa Stellar Ball in Tokyo. Hello! Project producer Tsunku, recuperating from laryngeal cancer, didn't attend, but he sent a message in which he made the announcement. He also revealed that the album would feature surprise combinations of the group members singing songs together.

The album was released in three versions: Limited Edition A (CD + DVD) which is packaged in a digipak case with a booklet, Limited Edition B (CD + DVD), and Regular Edition (CD only). Both limited editions include a serial-numbered lottery card.

It is the last album to feature Sayumi Michishige, Riho Sayashi, and Kanon Suzuki.

=== Singles ===
The song "Toki wo Koe Sora wo Koe / Password is 0" (Japanese 『時空を超え 宇宙を超え／Password is 0』) was released as the second by Morning Musume '14. It was released on April 16, 2014, in 6 editions: 2 regular and 4 limited editions. Both "Password is 0" and "Password is 0 (Morimusu Ver.)" were used for the au(KDDI) Spring 2014 commercial campaign featuring Morimusu.

== Track listing ==
All tracks are written by Tsunku.

CD
No.	Title	Length
1.	"Tiki Bun (Album Version)"	5:13
2.	"Password is 0"	4:31
3.	"Ashita o Tsukuru no wa Kimi" (明日を作るのは君)	3:46
4.	"Kirari to Hikaru Hoshi" (キラリと光る星) (Sung by: Riho Sayashi, Sakura Oda)	3:48
5.	"Koibito ni wa Zettai ni Shiraretakunai Shinjitsu" (恋人には絶対に知られたくない真実) (Sung by: Sayumi Michishige, Mizuki Fukumura, Haruna Iikubo)	4:11
6.	"What is Love?"	3:12
7.	"Watashi wa Watashi Nanda" (私は私なんだ)	4:01
8.	"Waraenai Hanashi" (笑えない話)	4:03
9.	"Egao no Kimi wa Taiyō sa"	4:34
10.	"Kimi no Kawari wa Iyashinai"	4:29
11.	"Otona ni Nareba Otona ni Nareru!?" (大人になれば 大人になれる) (Sung by：Erina Ikuta, Kanon Suzuki, Ayumi Ishida, Masaki Sato, Haruka Kudo)	3:57
12.	"Toki o Koe Sora o Koe"	4:47

== Charts ==
"Toki o Koe Sora o Koe / Password is 0"
Singles Chart	Peak position	Sales
Weekly Chart	1	119,409
