= Furari Ginza / Jiyū na Kuni Dakara =

Single by Morning Musume '18

from the album Best! Morning Musume 20th Anniversary
- Released: October 24, 2018 (Japan)
- Genre: J-pop
- Label: Zetima
- Songwriter: Tsunku
- Producer: Tsunku

Morning Musume '18 singles chronology
"Are You Happy? / A Gonna" (2018)	"Furari Ginza / Jiyū na Kuni Dakara" (2018)	"Jinsei Blues / Seishun Night" (2019)

Music video
- "Furari Ginza" on YouTube

"Furari Ginza / Jiyū na Kuni Dakara" (フラリ銀座／自由な国だから) is the 66th single by the J-pop group Morning Musume '18, released in Japan on October 24, 2018.

== Track listing ==
CD (all editions)
No.	Title	Lyrics	Music	Arrangement	Length
1.	"Furari Ginza" (フラリ銀座)	Tsunku	Tsunku	Hirata Shoichiro	3:58
2.	"Jiyū na Kuni Dakara" (自由な国だから)	Tsunku	Tsunku	Kaoru Ōkubo	5:00
3.	"Y Jiro no Tochū" (Y字路の途中)	Riko Ōhashi	Riko Ōhashi	Shuhei Takahashi	5:13
4.	"Furari Ginza (Instrumental)"				3:57
5.	"Jiyū na Kuni Dakara (Instrumental)"				5:00
6.	"Y Jiro no Tochū (Instrumental)"				5:14

Limited Edition A DVD
No.	Title	Length
1.	"Furari Ginza (Music Video)"	4:25

Limited Edition B DVD
No.	Title	Length
1.	"Jiyū na Kuni Dakara (Music Video)"	5:37

Limited Edition SP DVD
No.	Title	Length
1.	"Furari Ginza (Dance Shot ver.)"	4:04
2.	"Jiyū na Kuni Dakara (Dance Shot ver.)"	5:06
3.	"Making-of the music videos "Furari Ginza" / "Jiyū na Kuni Dakara"" (フラリ銀座/自由な国だから MV撮影メイキング映像)	21:22

== Charts ==
Chart (2018)	Peak position
"Furari Ginza / Jiyū na Kuni Dakara" (single)
Japan (Oricon Weekly CD Singles Chart)	2
Japan (Oricon Daily CD Singles Chart)	2
Japan (Billboard Japan Top Singles Sales)	2
"Furari Ginza" (song)
Japan (Billboard Japan Hot 100)	2
