= Maji Desu ka Ska! =

- Regular Edition cover

Single by Morning Musume

from the album 12, Smart
- B-side: "Motto Aishite Hoshii no"
- Released: April 6, 2011
- Recorded: 2011
- Genre: Ska pop; pop rock
- Length: 3:40
- Label: Zetima
- Songwriter: Tsunku
- Producer: Tsunku

Morning Musume singles chronology
"Onna to Otoko no Lullaby Game" (2010)	"Maji Desu ka Ska!" (2011)	"Only You" (2011)

"Maji Desu ka Ska!" (まじですかスカ!, Maji Desu ka Suka!; Seriously, Ska!?) is the 45th single of the Japanese group Morning Musume, released on April 6, 2011 on the Zetima record label. The single sold 33,698 copies in its first week, charting at #5 on the weekly Oricon singles charts and peaking at #7 on the Japan Billboard Hot 100.

== Background ==
"Maji Desu ka Ska!" is the first single to feature Morning Musume's ninth generation, Mizuki Fukumura, Erina Ikuta, Riho Sayashi and Kanon Suzuki, since their addition to the group in January 2011, and the first following the departures of Eri Kamei, Junjun and Linlin, who graduated in December 2010. The song is noted to have a ska feel to it, which was ultimately chosen by producer Tsunku instead of a more reggae-oriented song.

The single was released in five versions, the first single by the group to be released in more than four types: a regular edition, and four limited editions (A, B, C and D) all including a different DVD. Each DVD contains a solo interview with a member of the ninth generation. All limited editions and the first press of the regular edition sport different covers and contain a serial number card, which could be used to enter a draw to win release event tickets.

On February 23, 2011, Bijo Gaku, Hello! Project's weekly variety show, aired the first preview of the song. The following day an official preview was aired on radio.

The single was originally due to be released on March 23; however, due to the 2011 Tōhoku earthquake and tsunami, the release was postponed and later rescheduled for April 6.

Upon its release, the single was the group's 45th consecutive top-10 single, with all releases since "Morning Coffee" having charted within the top 10 on the Oricon charts. This feat equaled SMAP's record of 45 consecutive top 10-charting singles, whose 45th single, "This is Love", was released in August 2010.

== Participating members ==
- 5th generation: Ai Takahashi, Risa Niigaki
- 6th generation: Sayumi Michishige, Reina Tanaka
- 8th generation: Aika Mitsui
- 9th generation (debut): Mizuki Fukumura, Erina Ikuta, Riho Sayashi, Kanon Suzuki

== Track list ==
All tracks are written by Tsunku.

CD
No.	Title	Arranged by	Length
1.	"Maji Desu ka Ska!" (まじですかスカ!, Seriously, Ska!?)	Masanori Takumi	3:43
2.	"Motto Aishite Hoshii no" (もっと愛してほしいの, I Want You to Love Me More)	Kaoru Ōkubo	4:21
3.	"Maji Desu ka Ska! (Instrumental)"		3:42

Limited Edition A DVD
No.	Title	Length
1.	"Maji Desu ka Ska! (Close-up Ver. type1)"
2.	"Mizuki Fukumura Solo Interview"

Limited Edition B DVD
No.	Title	Length
1.	"Maji Desu ka Ska! (Dance Shot Ver. type1)"
2.	"Erina Ikuta Solo Interview"

Limited Edition C DVD
No.	Title	Length
1.	"Maji Desu ka Ska! (Close-up Ver. type2)"
2.	"Riho Sayashi Solo Interview"

Limited Edition D DVD
No.	Title	Length
1.	"Maji Desu ka Ska! (Dance Shot Ver. type2)"
2.	"Kanon Suzuki Solo Interview"

== Personnel ==
- Ai Takahashi – main vocals
- Risa Niigaki – center vocal
- Sayumi Michishige – center vocals
- Reina Tanaka – main vocals
- Aika Mitsui – center vocals
- Mizuki Fukumura – center vocals
- Erina Ikuta – center vocals
- Riho Sayashi – center vocals
- Kanon Suzuki – center vocals

Track 1

- Chorus: Ai Takahashi, Tsunku
- Guitar: Koji Kamada
- Programming, guitar, bass: Masanori Takumi

Track 2

- Chorus: Ai Takahashi
- Keyboard, programming: Kaoru Okubo
- Guitar: Koji Kamada

== Charts ==
Chart (2011)	Peak position
Oricon Daily Singles Chart	3
Oricon Weekly Singles Chart	5
Oricon Monthly Singles Chart	
Billboard Japan Hot 100	7
Billboard Japan Hot Top Airplay	23
Billboard Japan Hot Singles Sales	4
Billboard Japan Adult Contemporary Airplay	19
