= Kanon Suzuki =

Japanese pop singer

Kanon Suzuki 鈴木 香音
- Also known as: Zukki (ズッキ)
- Born: August 5, 1998 (age 27); Aichi Prefecture, Japan
- Genres: J-pop
- Occupations: Singer; Dancer
- Years active: 2011–2016
- Label: Zetima
- Website: helloproject.com/morningmusume

Kanon Suzuki (Japanese: 鈴木 香音, Hepburn: Suzuki Kanon) is a former Japanese pop singer. She is a former ninth-generation member of the Japanese girl group Morning Musume.

== Hello! Project groups and units ==
- Morning Musume (2011–2016)
- Hello! Project Mobekimasu (2011)

== Discography ==
=== Singles ===
Morning Musume

- "Maji Desu ka Ska!" (April 6, 2011)
- "Only You" (June 15, 2011)
- "Kono Chikyū no Heiwa o Honki de Negatterun Da yo! / Kare to Issho ni Omise ga Shitai!" (September 21, 2011)
- "Pyoco Pyoco Ultra" (January 25, 2012)
- "Ren'ai Hunter" (April 11, 2012)
- "One Two Three / The Matenrō Show" (July 4, 2012)
- "Wakuteka Take a Chance" (October 10, 2012)
- "Help Me!!" (January 23, 2013)
- "Brainstorming / Kimi Sae Ireba Nani mo Iranai" (April 17, 2013)
- "Wagamama Ki no Mama Ai no Joke / Ai no Gundan" (August 28, 2013)
- "Egao no Kimi wa Taiyō sa / Kimi no Kawari wa Iyashinai / What is Love?" (January 29, 2014)
- "Toki o Koe Sora o Koe / Password is 0" (April 16, 2014)
- "Tiki Bun / Shabadaba Dū / Mikaeri Bijin" (October 15, 2014)
- "Seishun Kozo ga Naiteiru / Yūgure wa Ameagari / Ima Koko Kara" (April 15, 2015)
- "Oh My Wish! / Sukatto My Heart / Ima Sugu Tobikomu Yūki" (August 19, 2015)
- "Tsumetai Kaze to Kataomoi / Endless Sky / One and Only" (December 29, 2015)
- "Utakata Saturday Night! / The Vision / Tokyo to Iu Katasumi" (May 11, 2016)

Hello! Project Mobekimasu

- "Busu ni Naranai Tetsugaku" ブスにならない哲学 (November 16, 2011)

== Filmography ==
=== Solo DVDs ===
- Greeting: Suzuki Kanon (Greeting ～鈴木 香音～)

=== TV dramas ===
- Sūgaku Joshi Gakuen (January 11, 2012 — March 28, 2012)

=== Musicals ===
- Reborn: Inochi no Audition (リボーン～命のオーディション～) (October 8–17, 2011, Yoyogi, Shibuya, Tokyo)
- Stacy's Shoujo Saisatsu Kageki (ステーシーズ 少女再殺歌劇) (2012)
- Idol Nihonryuu ~Onna Nichibu~ (アイドル日本流～おんな日舞～) (2012)

=== TV shows ===
- Bijo Gaku (美女学) (2011)
- Hello Pro! Time (ハロプロ!TIME) (September 2011 – 2012)

=== Internet shows ===
- UstreaMusume (ユーストリー娘。) (April 2011–present)

== Events ==
- Hello! Channel Vol. 5 handshake event to celebrate the release of the magazine-book series (August 19, 2011)
