= List of Morning Musume members =

This page consists of all current and former members of the Japanese girl group Morning Musume. The group is known for their ever-fluctuating line-up, with "graduations" and auditions held nearly every year.

== Current members ==
=== 11th generation (2012) ===
- Sakura Oda (小田さくら) (Graduating On December 11 2026)

=== 12th generation (2014) ===
- Miki Nonaka (野中美希)

=== 15th generation (2019) ===
- Homare Okamura (岡村ほまれ)
- Mei Yamazaki (山﨑愛生)

=== 16th generation (2022) ===
- Rio Sakurai (櫻井梨央)

=== 17th generation (2023) ===
- Haruka Inoue (井上春華)
- Ako Yumigeta (弓桁朱琴)

=== 18th generation (2026) ===
- Meisa Sugihara (杉原明紗)
- Miyu Yasuda (安田美結)
- Moa Suzuki (鈴木もあ)
- Hanano Ishikawa (石川華望)

== Former members ==
=== 1st generation (1997) ===
- Yuko Nakazawa (中澤裕子, graduated April 15, 2001)
- Aya Ishiguro (石黒彩, graduated January 7, 2000)
- Kaori Iida (飯田圭織, graduated January 30, 2005)
- Natsumi Abe (安倍なつみ, graduated January 25, 2004)
- Asuka Fukuda (福田明日香, graduated April 18, 1999)

=== 2nd generation (1998) ===
- Kei Yasuda (保田圭, graduated May 5, 2003)
- Mari Yaguchi (矢口真里, left April 14, 2005)
- Sayaka Ichii (市井紗耶香, graduated May 21, 2000)

=== 3rd generation (1999) ===
- Maki Goto (後藤真希, graduated September 23, 2002)

=== 4th generation (2000) ===
- Rika Ishikawa (石川梨華, graduated May 7, 2005)
- Hitomi Yoshizawa (吉澤ひとみ, graduated May 6, 2007)
- Nozomi Tsuji (辻希美, graduated August 1, 2004)
- Ai Kago (加護亜依, graduated August 1, 2004)

=== 5th generation (2001) ===
- Ai Takahashi (高橋愛, graduated September 30, 2011)
- Asami Konno (紺野あさ美, graduated July 23, 2006)
- Makoto Ogawa (小川麻琴, graduated August 27, 2006)
- Risa Niigaki (新垣里沙, graduated May 18, 2012)

=== 6th generation (2003) ===
- Miki Fujimoto (藤本美貴, left June 1, 2007)
- Eri Kamei (亀井絵里, graduated December 15, 2010)
- Sayumi Michishige (道重さゆみ, graduated November 26, 2014)
- Reina Tanaka (田中れいな, graduated May 21, 2013)

=== 7th generation (2005) ===
- Koharu Kusumi (久住小春, graduated December 6, 2009)

=== 8th generation (2007) ===
- Aika Mitsui (光井愛佳, graduated May 18, 2012)
- Jun Jun (ジュンジュン, graduated December 15, 2010)
- Lin Lin (リンリン, graduated December 15, 2010)

=== 9th generation (2011) ===
- Mizuki Fukumura (譜久村聖, graduated November 29, 2023)
- Erina Ikuta (生田衣梨奈, graduated July 8, 2025)
- Riho Sayashi (鞘師里保, graduated December 31, 2015)
- Kanon Suzuki (鈴木香音, graduated May 31, 2016)

=== 10th generation (2012) ===
- Haruna Iikubo (飯窪春菜, graduated December 16, 2018)
- Ayumi Ishida (石田亜佑美, graduated December 6, 2024)
- Masaki Satō (佐藤優樹, graduated December 13, 2021)
- Haruka Kudō (工藤遥, graduated December 11, 2017)

=== 12th generation (2014) ===
- Haruna Ogata (尾形春水, graduated June 20, 2018)
- Maria Makino (牧野真莉愛), graduated June 24, 2026)
- Akane Haga (羽賀朱音, graduated December 5, 2025)

=== 13th generation (2016) ===
- Kaede Kaga (加賀楓, graduated December 10, 2022)
- Reina Yokoyama (横山玲奈, graduated December 5, 2025)

=== 14th generation (2017) ===
- Chisaki Morito (森戸知沙希, graduated June 20, 2022)

=== 15th generation (2019) ===
- Rio Kitagawa (北川莉央, graduated December 27, 2025)

== Leadership ==
Morning Musume contains a leader and a sub-leader role, which consists of providing moral support to the group. The sub-leader position was established on April 16, 2001, when Kaori Iida became the second leader.

=== Leaders ===
Leader	Period of time
Yuko Nakazawa	September 7, 1997 – April 15, 2001
Kaori Iida	April 16, 2001 – January 30, 2005
Mari Yaguchi	January 31, 2005 – April 14, 2005
Hitomi Yoshizawa	April 15, 2005 – May 6, 2007
Miki Fujimoto	May 7, 2007 – June 1, 2007
Ai Takahashi	June 2, 2007 – September 30, 2011
Risa Niigaki	October 1, 2011 – May 18, 2012
Sayumi Michishige	May 19, 2012 – November 26, 2014
Mizuki Fukumura	November 27, 2014 – November 29, 2023
Erina Ikuta	November 30, 2023 – July 8, 2025
Miki Nonaka	July 9, 2025 – Present

=== Sub-leaders ===
Sub Leader	Period of time
Kei Yasuda	April 16, 2001 – May 5, 2003
Mari Yaguchi	May 6, 2003 – January 30, 2005
Hitomi Yoshizawa	January 31, 2005 – April 14, 2005
Miki Fujimoto	April 15, 2005 – May 6, 2007
Ai Takahashi	May 7, 2007 – June 1, 2007
Risa Niigaki	June 2, 2007 – September 30, 2011
Mizuki Fukumura	May 22, 2013 – November 26, 2014
Haruna Iikubo	May 22, 2013 – December 16, 2018
Erina Ikuta	November 27, 2014 – November 29, 2023
Ayumi Ishida	December 31, 2018 – December 6, 2024
Sakura Oda	November 30, 2023 – 2026
Maria Makino	July 9, 2025 – June 24, 2026

== See also ==
- Hello Pro Kenshūsei
