= Maria Makino =

Japanese pop singer (born 2001)

Maria Makino 牧野 真莉愛
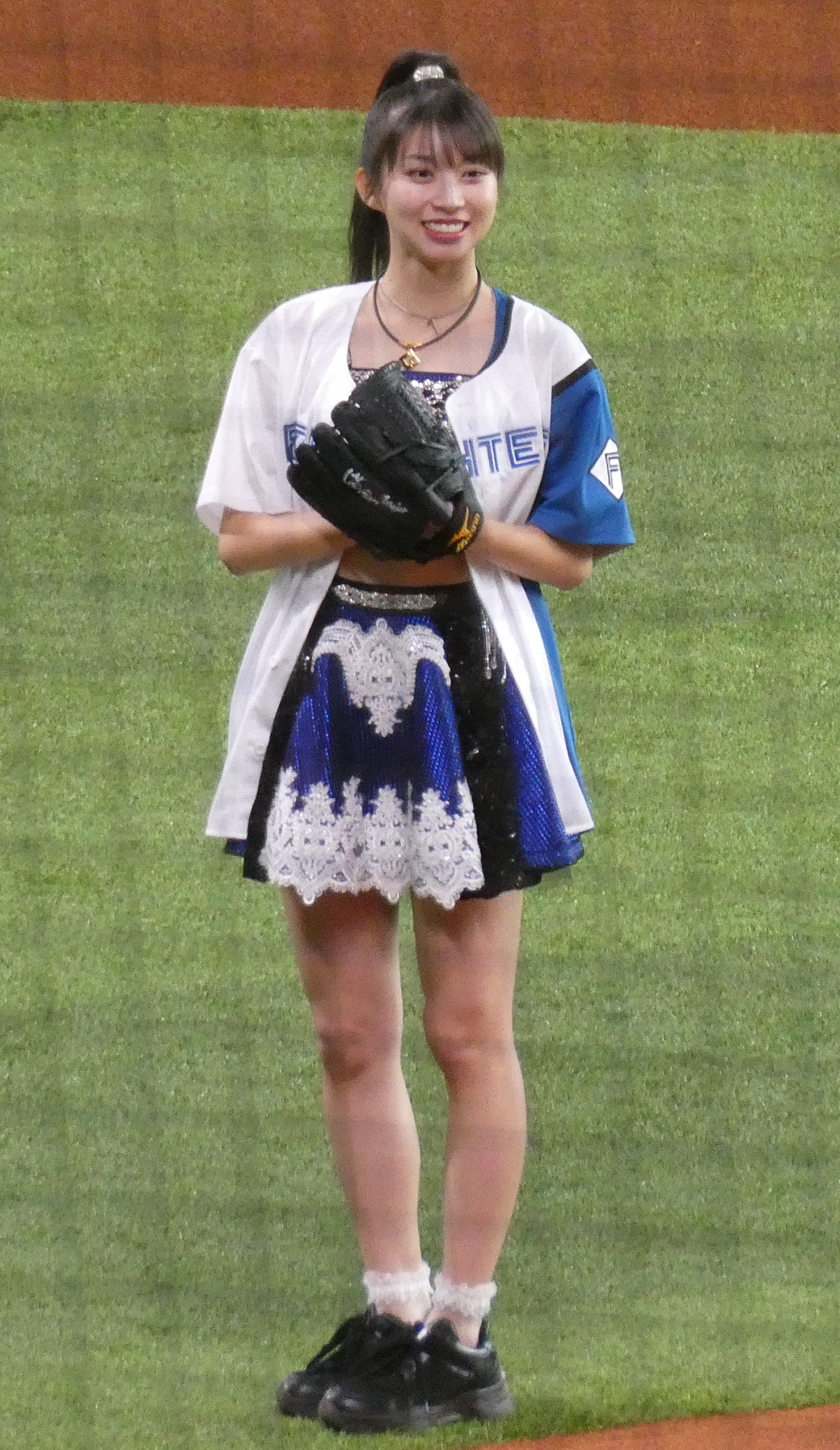
- Makino in Es Con Field Hokkaido (2025)

Background information
- Born: February 2, 2001 (age 25)
- Origin: Nishio, Aichi, Japan
- Genre: Pop
- Occupations: Singer; Model; Dancer
- Years active: 2014–present
- Labels: Pony Canyon; Zetima
- Formerly of: Morning Musume (2014–2026); Hello! Project

Maria Makino (Japanese: 牧野 真莉愛, Hepburn: Makino Maria) (born February 2, 2001) is a Japanese pop singer, dancer and model. She is a former 12th generation member and Sub-Leader of Japanese girl group Morning Musume.

== Biography ==
Makino joined Hello Pro Kenshusei on November 1, 2012, the news was later made public by Hello Project on November 20. In summer 2014, Maria auditioned for the Morning Musume '14 (Golden) Audition! for an opportunity to join Morning Musume '14 and successfully passed. She was introduced as a 12th generation member during Morning Musume '14's concert at Nippon Budokan on September 30, alongside Haruna Ogata, Miki Nonaka and Akane Haga.

On April 9, 2026, it was announced that Makino Maria would be graduating from Morning Musume and Hello! Project after the conclusion of the group's upcoming spring tour.

On April 11, it was announced at the Morning Musume '26 Concert Tour Haru - Rays Of Light - that Makino would be graduating on June 24 with her graduation concert taking place at Nippon Budokan as the final concert of the spring tour.

== Discography ==
For Maria Makino's releases with Morning Musume, see Morning Musume discography.

== Filmography ==
=== DVDs and Blu-rays ===
#	Title	Details	Charts
#	Title	Details	JP Oricon Blu-ray
1	Greeting ~Makino Maria~	Released: March 24, 2015; Label: Up-Front Works (e-Hello! series)	—
2	Blanc	Released: March 7, 2018; Label: Zetima (EPXE-5128)	18

==== Photobooks ====
- [2015.11.14] Makino Maria Mini Photobook "Greeting -Photobook-" (牧野真莉愛ミニ写真集「Greeting-Photobook-」)
- [2016.08.06] Maria
- [2017.08.30] Senkou Hanabi (せんこう花火)
- [2018.02.02] Maria 17sai (マリア17歳)
- [2018.08.25] Summer Days
- [2019.02.02] María 18 años
- [2020.02.02] Maria19
- [2021.02.02] Maria Hatachi (真莉愛二十歳)
