= Mizuki Fukumura =

Japanese singer (born 1996)

Mizuki Fukumura 譜久村 聖
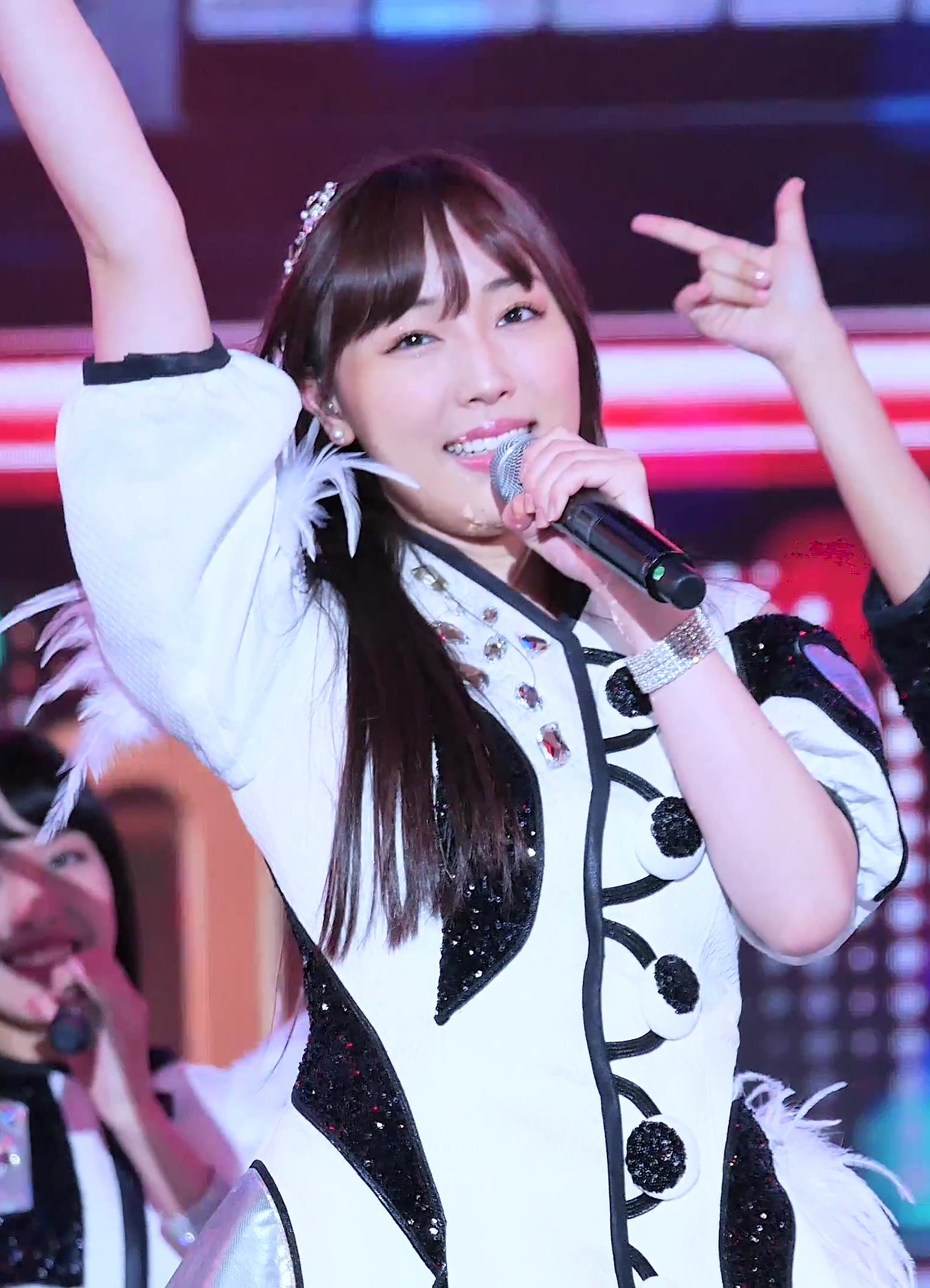
- Fukumura in 2016

Background information
- Born: October 30, 1996 (age 29); Tokyo, Japan
- Genres: J-pop
- Occupations: Singer; actress
- Years active: 2008–present
- Labels: Pony Canyon; Zetima
- Formerly of: Morning Musume; Shugo Chara! Egg!; Hello! Pro Egg

Mizuki Fukumura (譜久村 聖, Fukumura Mizuki; born October 30, 1996 in Tokyo) is a Japanese singer and actress. She is a former ninth-generation member, leader of the pop group Morning Musume as well as the seventh leader of Hello Project. Prior to becoming part of Morning Musume, Fukumura was known as a member of the second generation Shugo Chara! Egg!, and for her role of Amulet Heart in the live action segment of Shugo Chara! Party!.

== Career ==
=== 2006–2010: Auditions, early career and Shugo Chara! Egg! ===
In 2006, a contest for the anime series Kirarin Revolution titled the "Kirarin Girl Contest 2006" was held. Fukumura, aged 10, entered the contest and came in second place.

As a Hello! Project fan since early childhood, Fukumura had long dreamed of joining Hello Project. Her mother, being supportive, told her about the auditions for Hello! Pro Egg. She passed the audition and became an official member of Hello! Pro Egg on June 22, 2008, along with Rie Kaneko and Akari Takeuchi. The announcement and introduction of the new members was made at the 2008 Hello! Project Shinjin Kouen 6gatsu "Akasaka Hop!" concert.

Fukumura's first performance took place on September 23 at the 2008 Hello! Project Shinjin Kouen 9gatsu "Shibakouen Step!" concert.

On August 26, 2009, Fukumura was added to the group Shugo Chara! Egg! as a second generation member. She debuted on television in the role of Amulet Heart in Shugo Chara! Party!.

In 2010, Fukumura participated as a backing dancer in two of Erina Mano's music videos, "Haru no Arashi" and "Onegai Dakara...".

=== 2011–2023: Morning Musume ===
In 2011, Morning Musume's ninth generation auditions were held, and the Hello! Pro Egg members were allowed to take part in them. Fukumura, being a fan of the group, auditioned. She sang "Maji Bomber" by Berryz Kobo and reached the third round before being informed that she had not passed the audition. The audition result was officially announced at the Hello! Project 2011 Winter "Kangei Shinsen Matsuri" concert on January 2, where Fukumura also worked as a backing dancer with other Hello! Project members. When the producer of Morning Musume, Tsunku, announced the result live on stage, it was a complete surprise to Fukumura that she had been chosen to enter Morning Musume as a ninth generation member with audition winners Erina Ikuta, Riho Sayashi and Kanon Suzuki. Fukumura debuted with Morning Musume at the same concert. "Maji Desu ka Ska!", released as a single on April 6, 2011, was the first Morning Musume song with Fukumura.

In March 2011, Fukumura's first e-Hello DVD, Greeting, was announced. The DVD was released on May 17, 2011. Fukumura (along with Iikubo Haruna) was appointed a sub-leader of Morning Musume at Tanaka Reina's graduation concert on May 21, 2013.

On April 18, 2012, it was announced that Morning Musume's 9th and 10th generation members, along with Tanaka Reina, would star in a stage play titled Stacey's Shoujo Saisatsu Kageki. The play ran from June 6 to 12. On May 13, it was announced that Morning Musume's 9th and 10th generation members, as well as S/mileage's 2nd generation members, would be having an FC event called Mosuma FC Event ~Gachi☆Kira~, it took place on June 15, 18 and 20 at Yokohama Blitz. In July, It was announced Fukumura would be in a photobook featuring the 9th and 10th generation. In September, Fukumura and the other 9th and 10th generation members started to blog. Shortly after, she dyed her hair brown. In October, it was announced that the ninth generation would be getting an Alo-Hello photobook. In October and November, Fukumura attended the worldwide handshake events. She traveled to Thailand, Taiwan, France and Korea with four other members of Morning Musume. On November 9, Fukumura participated in a birthday FC event, alongside Iikubo Haruna and Ishida Ayumi. On November 15, Fukumura participated as a guest at Ishikawa Rika's FC event. On November 23, Fukumura made an appearance at Takeuchi Akari's birthday FC event. She also appeared in UTB+ magazine with Mano Erina. On December 27, Fukumura's 2012 Alo-Hello Digital Photobook was released, It was met with much success on the Ugosha+ website.

On January 1, 2013, Fukumura did an interview for Girls News. On January 23, she appeared in Junon magazine with fellow Morning Musume members Michishige Sayumi, Ishida Ayumi and Oda Sakura. On January 27, she appeared on Kikkawa Yuu's radio show Kikkawa Yuu Kikkari 10pun Chotto. On February 21, she appeared on the front cover of Weekly Famitsu Taiwan, this was her first time appearing solo on a front cover of a magazine. It was announced that Fukumura would be participating in a stage play titled Gogakuyuu (ごがくゆう). On March 9, she appeared on a radio show with Samna. On March 19, a solo video of Fukumura singing "Aruiteru" was shown on Hello! Project Station. On March 27, it was announced that she would be releasing a solo photobook, titled Mizuki, on May 15, and a solo DVD titled, Mizuki in Guam, on May 22. On March 30, she attended the opening event of the new Hello! Project shop in Akihabara with Michishige Sayumi, Iikubo Haruna and Fukuda Kanon.

On January 7, 2014, Fukumura made a gravure appearance in Young Gangan, she was also the cover girl. A making of DVD for the magazine issue was released on March 20 with Young Gangan vol. 7 issue. On March 1, the official Morning Musume Twitter account tweeted that she would be absent from upcoming events due to influenza. On March 27, Fukumura's second solo DVD, Pancake, was announced through online store websites. It was due be released on June 11. On April 18, Fukumura made a gravure appearance in Young Gangan (vol. 09), she was also the cover girl. A making of DVD for the magazine issue was released on May 16 with Young Gangan vol. 11 issue. On April 22, it was revealed that her solo DVD, Pancake, had been postponed. It was now set to be released on August 6. On May 15, her second solo photobook, Utakata, was announced. It was released on June 25. On October 30, Fukumura celebrated her 18th birthday. The special event was called Morning Musume '14 ~Fukumura Mizuki Birthday Event 2014~, the event was one performance in Tokyo at Yamano Hall. On November 23, Fukumura was appointed as the new leader of Morning Musume by Michishige Sayumi. It was publicly announced on November 26, 2014, during the fall tour finale.

On October 30, 2015, Fukumura celebrated her 19th birthday. The special event was called Morning Musume '15 Fukumura Mizuki & Kudo Haruka Birthday Event ~FukuDuu Birthday Party!~, and the event was two performances in Tokyo. At the Differ Ariake event, she announced her third solo photobook, Kagayaki, tol be released on December 5.On December 4, she was featured in the "YG Bishoujo Santa Collection 2015" edition of Young Gangan.

On January 20, 2016, Fukumura released her first solo image Blu-ray, Yuubae. On May 6, Fukumura made a gravure appearance and was the cover girl for Young Gangan. The magazine issue included a mini photobook. In UTB vol. 34 released on October 8, Fukumura made a gravure appearance and it was announced that she'd be starting a "short-term gravure serialization" with the magazine. On November 2, Fukumura celebrated her 20th birthday at a special event called Morning Musume '16 Fukumura Mizuki Birthday Event, which featured one performance at Differ Ariake. On November 24, Fukumura and Ishida Ayumi announced they would hold a joint fan club bus tour the next year on January 26 and 27, titled Morning Days Happy Holiday Fukumura Mizuki･Ishida Ayumi Fanclub Tour in Yamanashi.

On December 27, 2022, it was announced that Mizuki Fukumura is set to graduate from Morning Musume and Hello! Project after the last concert of the Hello! Project 2023 Autumn CITY CIRCUIT.

On November 29, she officially graduated from Morning Musume and Hello! Project at the Morning Musume '23 Concert Tour Aki "Neverending Shine Show ~Sanctuary~" Fukumura Mizuki Sotsugyou Special in Yokohama Arena.

=== 2024–present: Solo activities ===
Since March 31 2025, she has been a DJ on NHK FM's "Music Line".

Her solo debut single Long Love Letter / Anniversary wa Iranai released on April 23 2025.

== Hello! Project groups and units ==
- Hello Pro Egg (2008–2011)
- Shugo Chara! Egg! (2009–2010)
- Morning Musume (2011–2023)
- Hello! Project Mobekimasu (2011–2013)
- Hello! Project Station Dance Club (2013–2015)
- Stelladrop (2014–2015)

== Discography ==
for Mizuki Fukumura's releases with Morning Musume, see Morning Musume discography.

== Filmography ==
=== DVDs ===
Title	Release date	Chart position	Label
Title	Release date	Oricon Weekly DVD Chart	Label
Greeting ~Fukumura Mizuki~	May 17, 2011	—	e-Hello! series
Mizuki in Guam	May 22, 2013	31	Zetima (EPBE-5466)
Pancake	August 6, 2014	32	Zetima
Yuubae	January 20, 2016	—	Zetima

==== Photobooks ====
- [2013.05.15] MIZUKI
- [2014.06.25] Utakata (うたかた)
- [2015.12.05] Kagayaki (かがやき)
- [2017.07.15] Hatachi (二十歳)
- [2018.10.30] Makana
- [2019.10.30] Tasha! (多謝！)
- [2022.01.02] glance
- [2023.10.30] LAST SCENE
- [2025.10.30] Ruri Ai
- [2025.10.30] Versl'Aube

=== TV series ===
- Shugo Chara! Party! ... Amulet Heart (アミュレットハート) (October 2009 --- March 2010)
- Sūgaku Joshi Gakuen (January 11, 2012 — March 28, 2012)

=== TV shows ===
- [2011] Bijo Gaku (美女学)
- [2011–2012] Hello Pro! TIME (ハロプロ！TIME)
- [2012–2013] Hello! SATOYAMA Life (ハロー！SATOYAMAライフ)
- [2014–2023] The Girls Live

=== Internet shows ===
- [2011] UstreaMusume
- [2013–2023] Hello! Project Station (ハロ！ステ)
