= Sakura Oda =

Japanese pop singer (born 1999)

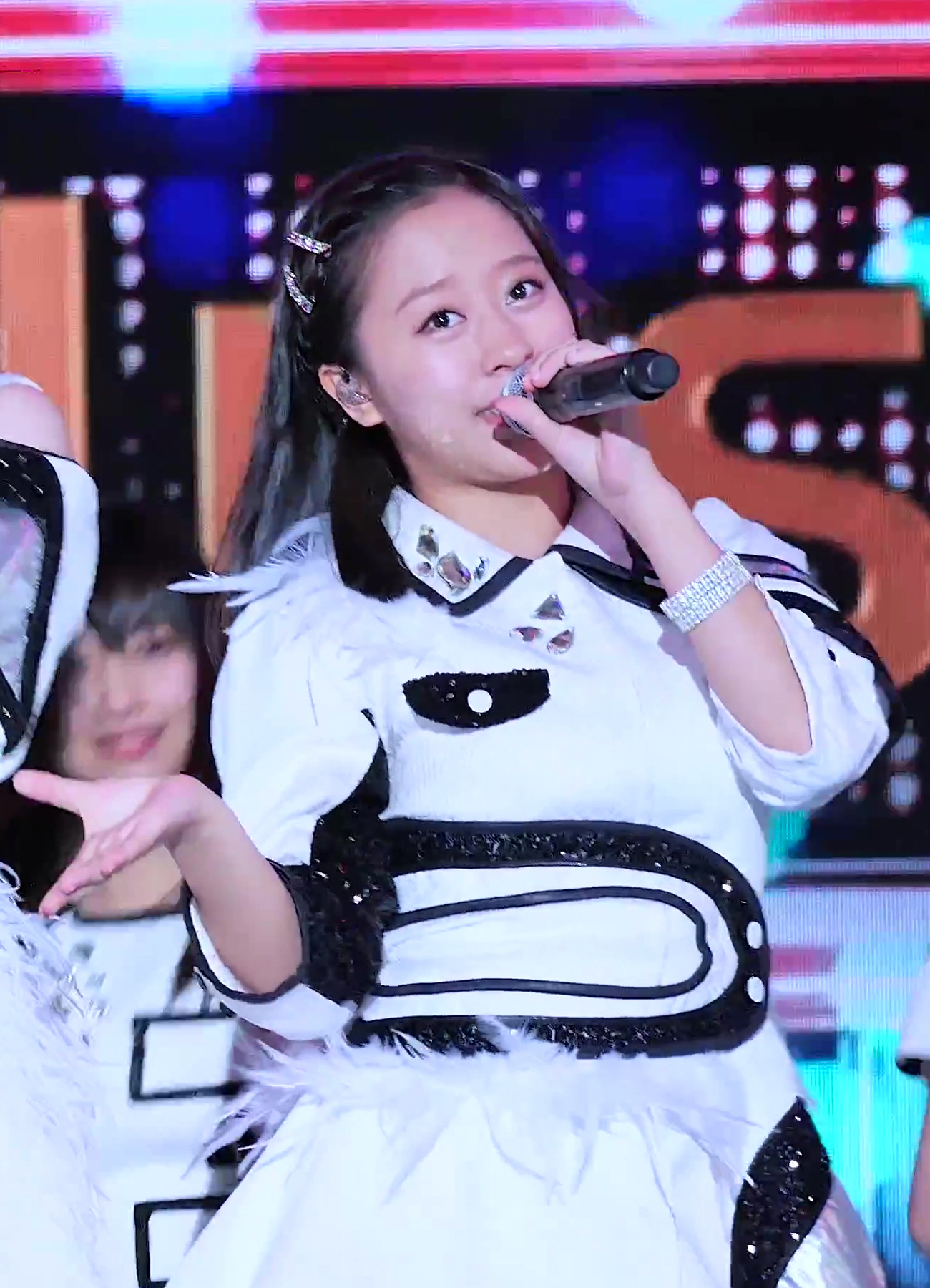

Background information
- Also known as: Sakura
- Born: March 12, 1999 (age 27); Zama, Kanagawa, Japan
- Occupations: Singer; Model; Dancer
- Musical career
- Instrument: Vocals
- Years active: 2011–present
- Label: Zetima
- Member of: Morning Musume
- Formerly of: Hello! Pro Egg
- Website: helloproject.com/morningmusume

Sakura Oda (小田 さくら, Oda Sakura; born 12 March 1999) is a Japanese pop singer and dancer. She is an 11th-generation member of the pop group Morning Musume. Prior to joining Morning Musume, Oda was a Hello! Pro Egg member. She is currently the sub-leader of Morning Musume.

== Career ==
In the summer of 2011, Sakura Oda took part in the S/mileage 2nd generation audition, but did not pass. In November 2011, she was added to Hello! Pro Egg, a Hello! Project trainee group, which was later renamed "Hello! Pro Kenshūsei".

In the middle of 2012, Oda participated in the 11th generation audition for Morning Musume, in which 7,000 applicants took part. She advanced to the final round with five other girls. On 14 September 2012, at a public dress rehearsal of Morning Musume 15th Anniversary Concert Tour held at Harmony Hall Zama in Kanagawa (Oda's home prefecture), it was announced that Sakura Oda was the only one chosen to join the group.

On 1 July 2025, it was revealed that Sakura Oda will be graduating from Morning Musume and Hello! Project in 2026. Sakura Oda began discussing plans for her graduation around 2023, and with Erina Ikuta's graduation becoming concrete in 2024, further discussions about the next leader of the group were held and the timing of Oda's graduation was decided in this process. For this reason, Miki Nonaka will be taking the leader position while Sakura Oda would remain as sub-leader up until her graduation. Details regrading her graduation will be announced as soon as they are decided.

== Personal life ==
Her nickname in Hello! Pro Kenshūsei is Sakura. She admires Ai Takahashi and Risa Niigaki in terms of singing, and Saki Nakajima from Cute in terms of dancing.

== Hello! Project groups ==
- Hello! Pro Egg (2011–2012)
- Morning Musume (2012–2026)
- ODATOMO (2014–2016)

== Discography ==
For Sakura Oda's releases with Morning Musume, see Morning Musume discography.

=== Solo DVDs and Blu-rays ===
#	Title	Details	Charts
#	Title	Details	JP Oricon Blu-ray
1	Greeting ~Oda Sakura~	Release date: 30 January 2013; Label: Up-Front Works (e-Hello! series)	—
2	Behind of Photobook ~Sakura Moyō~	Release date: 29 November 2016; Label: Up-Front Works	—
3	Sakura in Guam	Release date: 27 December 2017; Label: Zetima (EPXE-5127)	59

== Bibliography ==
Oda's photobook "モーニング娘。’19 小田さくら写真集 さくらのきせつ" (out in March 2019) reached the top 10 of the Oricon photobook chart.
