= Maki Goto discography =

- Studio albums: 6
- EPs: 3
- Compilation albums: 2
- Singles: 23
- Collaborations: 4
- Music videos: 22

The discography of the Japanese singer Maki Goto consists of six studio albums, two compilation albums, three extended plays, and twenty-three singles. After graduating from Morning Musume, Goto released her solo debut single, "Ai no Bakayarō", on March 28, 2001, and her first solo album, Makking Gold 1, on February 5, 2003. Her second album, 2 Paint It Gold, was released on January 24, 2004, and her third album, 3rd Station, was released on February 23, 2005.

Following the release of her fourth album, How to Use Sexy, Goto decided to depart from Hello! Project and their main agency, Up-Front Agency, citing conflicts of interest in the direction of her career. In 2008, she signed onto Avex Trax's label and released her first extended play as a collaboration with Sweet Black, where she is the featured artist.

== Albums ==
=== Studio albums ===
Title	Details	Peak chart positions	Sales
Title	Details	JPN	Sales
Makking Gold 1 (マッキングGold①)	Released: February 5, 2003; Label: Up-Front Promotion, Piccolo Town; Formats: CD	4	105,000
2 Paint It Gold (②ペイント イット ゴールド)	Released: January 24, 2004; Label: Up-Front Promotion, Piccolo Town; Formats: CD	4	52,000
3rd Station (3rd ステーション)	Released: February 23, 2005; Label: Up-Front Promotion, Piccolo Town; Formats: CD	11	32,000
How to Use Sexy	Released: September 19, 2007; Label: Up-Front Promotion, Piccolo Town; Formats: CD	18	15,000
Ai Kotoba (Voice) (愛言葉 (Voice))	Released: November 2, 2011; Label: Avex Trax; Formats: CD	8	7,000
Songs of You and Me!	Released: November 2, 2022; Label: avex infinity; Formats: CD		
COLLECTION	Released: October 15, 2025; Label: avex trax; Formats: CD		

=== Compilation albums ===
Title	Details	Peak chart positions	Sales
Title	Details	JPN	Sales
Maki Goto Premium Best 1 (後藤真希 プレミアムベスト①)	Released: December 15, 2005; Label: Up-Front Promotion, Piccolo Town; Formats: CD	10	30,000
Maki Goto Complete Best Album 2001–2007 (Singles & Rare Tracks)	Released: September 22, 2010; Label: Up-Front Promotion, Piccolo Town; Formats: CD	74	2,000

== Extended plays ==
=== As lead artist ===
Title	Details	Peak chart positions	Sales
Title	Details	JPN	Sales
One	Released: June 28, 2010; Label: Avex Trax; Formats: CD	10	14,000
Gloria	Released: January 12, 2011; Label: Avex Trax; Formats: CD	12	7,000
Love	Released: May 5, 2011; Label: Avex Trax; Formats: CD	17	5,000
Prayer	Released: September 4, 2024; Label: Avex Trax; Formats: CD	45	934

=== As featured artist ===
Title	Details	Peak chart positions	Sales
Title	Details	JPN	Sales
Sweet Black (Sweet Black feat. Maki Goto)	Released: September 16, 2009; Label: Rhythm Zone; Formats: CD	26	7,000

== Singles ==
Title	Year	Peak chart positions	Sales	Album
Title	Year	JPN	Sales	Album
"Ai no Bakayarō" (愛のバカやろう)	2001	1	435,000	Makking Gold 1
"Afurechau... Be in Love" (溢れちゃう．．．Be in Love)	2001	2	210,000	Makking Gold 1
"Te o Nigitte Arukitai" (手を握って歩きたい)	2002	3	105,000	Makking Gold 1
"Yaruki! It's Easy" (やる気! It's Easy)	2002	2	113,000	Makking Gold 1
"Sans toi ma mie/Kimi to Itsumademo" (サントワマミー/君といつまでも)	2002	6	59,000	—
"Uwasa no Sexy Guy" (うわさのSexy Guy)	2003	6	61,000	2 Paint It Gold
"Scramble" (スクランブル, Sukuramburu)	2003	5	46,000	2 Paint It Gold
"Daite yo! Please Go On" (抱いてよ! Please Go On)	2003	4	59,000	2 Paint It Gold
"Genshoku Gal Hade ni Ikube!" (原色Gal派手に行くべ!)	2003	3	45,000	2 Paint It Gold
"Sayonara no Love Song" (サヨナラのLove Song)	2004	5	35,000	3rd Station
"Yokohama Shinkirō" (横浜蜃気楼)	2004	8	31,000	3rd Station
"Sayonara 'Tomodachi ni wa Naritakunai no'" (さよなら「友達にはなりたくないの」)	2004	9	29,000	3rd Station
"Suppin to Namida" (スッピンと涙。)	2005	9	21,000	Maki Goto Premium Best 1
"Ima ni Kitto... In My Life" (今にきっと...In My Life)	2006	12	21,000	—
"Glass no Pumps" (ガラスのパンプス)	2006	7	28,000	How to Use Sexy
"Some Boys! Touch"	2006	5	29,000	How to Use Sexy
"Secret" (シークレット)	2007	9	15,000	How to Use Sexy

=== Promotional singles ===
Title	Year	Peak chart positions	Sales	Album
Title	Year	JPN	Sales	Album
"Fly Away" (Sweet Black feat. Maki Goto)	2009	—	—	Sweet Black
"Lady Rise" (Sweet Black feat. Maki Goto)	2009	—	—	Sweet Black
"With..." (Sweet Black feat. Maki Goto)	2009	—	—	Sweet Black
"Koi Hitoyo" (恋一夜)	2010	—	—	Gloria
"What is Love/Scandalous"	2011	—	—	Ai Kotoba (Voice)

=== Digital Singles ===
Title	Year	Peak chart positions	Sales	Album
Title	Year	JPN	Sales	Album
"CLAP CLAP"	2024	—	—	COLLECTION
"Chekera (チェケラ; Check It Out)"	2025	—	—	COLLECTION
"What?"	2025	—	—	COLLECTION
"Which?"	2025	—	—	COLLECTION

== Collaborations ==
Title	Year	Peak chart positions	Sales	Album
Title	Year	JPN	Sales	Album
"Golden Luv feat. Maki Goto" (Ravex featuring Maki Goto)	2009	—	—	Trax
"Fly Away House Nation Mix" (House Nation featuring Maki Goto)	2009	—	—	—
"Crazy in Luv feat. Maki Goto" (DJ Mayumi featuring Maki Goto)	2009	—	—	—
"Non stop love Yoroshiku!" (Non stop love 夜露死苦!) (Sho Ayanokoji featuring Maki Goto)	2011	—	—	—

== Videography ==
=== DVDs ===
Release	Name	Notice
March 5, 2003	Ken & Mary no Merikenko On Stage! Original Cast Ban	—
July 24, 2003	Maki Goto First Concert Tour 2003 Haru: Go! Makking Gold	1. Concert DVD
December 12, 2003	Maki Goto Single V Clips 1 (後藤真希 シングルVクリップス①)	1. Clip Collection
February 25, 2004	Maki Goto Concert Tour 2003 Aki: Sexy! Makking Gold	2. Concert DVD
September 15, 2004	Maki Goto Concert Tour 2004 Haru: Makkin-iro ni Nucchae!	3. Concert DVD
January 26, 2005	Maki Goto Concert Tour 2004 Aki: Aa Maki no Shirabe	4. Concert DVD
January 18, 2006	Maki Goto Concert Tour 2005 Aki: Hatachi	5. Concert DVD
July 5, 2006	Hello Pro Party! 2006: Maki Goto Captain Kōen	6. Concert DVD
October 11, 2006	Maki Goto Secret Live at Studio Coast: 2	7. Concert DVD
February 21, 2007	Maki Goto Live Tour 2006: G Emotion: 3	8. Concert DVD
April 25, 2007	Hello☆Pro On Stage! 2007 "Rock Desu yo!"	9. Concert DVD
November 28, 2007	Maki Goto Live Tour 2007 G-Emotion II: How to Use Sexy	10. Concert DVD
March 7, 2012	G-Emotion Final: For You	11. Concert DVD
Green marked tacks released under Hello! Project. Blue marked tacks released under the label Avex Trax.

=== Music videos ===
Title	Year	Notes	Ref.
"Ai no Bakayarō" (愛のバカやろう)	2001	—	—
"Afurechau... Be in Love" (溢れちゃう．．．Be in Love)	2001	—	—
"Te o Nigitte Arukitai" (手を握って歩きたい)	2002	—	—
"Yaruki! It's Easy" (やる気! It's Easy)	2002	—	—
"Sans toi ma mie/Kimi to Itsumademo" (サントワマミー/君といつまでも)	2002	—	—
"Uwasa no Sexy Guy" (うわさのSexy Guy)	2003	—	—
"Scramble" (スクランブル, Sukuramburu)	2003	—	—
"Daite yo! Please Go On" (抱いてよ! Please Go On)	2003	—	—
"Genshoku Gal Hade ni Ikube!" (原色Gal派手に行くべ!)	2003	—	—
"Sayonara no Love Song" (サヨナラのLove Song)	2004	—	—
"Yokohama Shinkirō" (横浜蜃気楼)	2004	—	—
"Sayonara 'Tomodachi ni wa Naritakunai no'" (さよなら「友達にはなりたくないの」)	2004	—	—
"Suppin to Namida" (スッピンと涙。)	2005	—	—
"Ima ni Kitto... In My Life" (今にきっと...In My Life)	2006	—	—
"Glass no Pumps" (ガラスのパンプス)	2006	—	—
"Some Boys! Touch"	2006	—	—
"Secret" (シークレット)	2007	—	—
"Fly Away" (Sweet Black feat. Maki Goto)	2009	—	—
"Lady Rise" (Sweet Black feat. Maki Goto)	2009	—	—
"With..." (Sweet Black feat. Maki Goto)	2009	—	—
"Queen Bee" (with Bigga Raiji) (Sweet Black feat. Maki Goto)	2009	—	—
"Tear Drops" (with KG) (Sweet Black feat. Maki Goto)	2009	—	—
"EYES" (Sweet Black feat. Maki Goto)	2010	—	—
