= Maki Goto Premium Best 1 =

Goto Maki Premium Best 1

Greatest hits album by Maki Goto
- Released: December 14, 2005
- Recorded: 2001–2005
- Genre: J-pop
- Length: 66:24
- Label: Piccolo Town
- Producer: Tsunku

Maki Goto chronology
3rd Station (2005)	Goto Maki Premium Best 1 (2005)	How to Use Sexy (2007)

Goto Maki Premium Best 1 (後藤真希 プレミアムベスト①, Gotō Maki Puremiamu Besuto Ichi) is the first compilation album by solo singer and former Morning Musume and Petit Moni member Maki Goto.

This album features several songs with different versions from the originals. "Ai no Bakayarō" has a slightly different arrangement, while "Suki Sugite Baka Mitai" is Goto's solo version of the original DEF.DIVA song. "Daite yo! Please Go On" is a live version recorded at the Hello! Project 2005 Natsu no Kayou Show -'05 Selection! Collection!- concert, while "Sayonara no Love Song" and "Afurechau...Be in Love" are new arrangements that have a different character from the original versions.

== Track listing ==
1. "Ai no Bakayarō (Bakayarō Version)" (愛のバカやろう(バカやろうVersion))
2. "Suki Sugite Baka Mitai (Goto Version)" (好きすぎて バカみたい(後藤Version))
3. "Te o Nigitte Arukitai" (手を握って歩きたい, I Want to Walk While Holding Hands)
4. "Suppin to Namida" (スッピンと涙。, Tears and a Face with No Make-Up)
5. "Daite yo! Please Go On (2005 Natsu Hello Version)" (抱いてよ！ PLEASE GO ON(2005夏ハロー！Version), Hold Me! Please Go On)
6. "Genshoku Gal Hade ni Ikube!" (原色GAL 派手に行くべ！, Genshoku Gal Hade ni Ikube!)
7. "Yaruki! It's Easy" (やる気！IT'S EASY)
8. "Scramble" (スクランブル)
9. "Uwasa no Sexy Guy" (うわさのSEXY GUY)
10. "Sayonara 'Tomodachi ni wa Naritakunai no'" (さよなら｢友達にはなりたくないの｣)
11. "Yokohama Shinkirō" (横浜蜃気楼)
12. "Sayonara no Love Song (Junjō Version)" (サヨナラのLOVE SONG(純情Version), Love Song of Goodbye)
13. "Olivia o Kikinagara (2005 Version)" (オリビアを聴きながら(2005 Version))
14. "Afurechau...Be in Love (Premium Version)" (溢れちゃう．．．BE IN LOVE(プレミアムVersion))
15. "'Hatachi no Premier'" (「二十歳のプレミア」)

Bonus Korean Tracks:

16. THANK YOU MEMORIES ('Suppin to Namida.' Korean Ver.) | THANK YOU MEMORIES ('スッピンと涙。'Korean Ver.)

17. PLEASE GO ON ('Daite yo! PLEASE GO ON' Korean Ver.) | PLEASE GO ON ('抱いてよ！PLEASE GO ON' Korean Ver.)
