= Naoto (dancer) =

Japanese dancer, actor, rapper, and creative director

- 片岡 直人
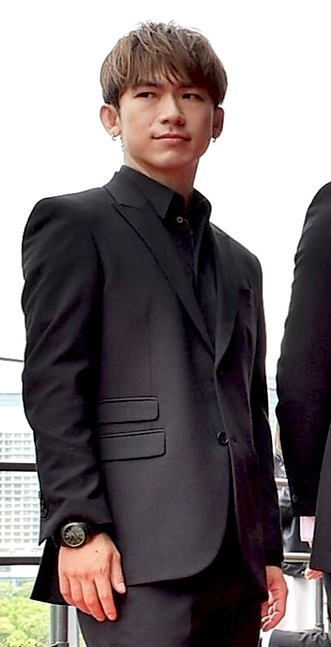
- Naoto at an event in 2018
- Born: Naoto Kataoka; 30 August 1983 (age 43); Tokorozawa, Saitama, Japan
- Other name: EXILE NAOTO
- Occupations: dancer; actor; rapper; creative director
- Agent: LDH
- Television: Frenemy: Dobunezumi no Machi; Last Cinderella; Night Hero Naoto
- Height: 169 cm (5 ft 7 in)
- Musical career
- Genres: J-pop; Hip hop
- Years active: 2003–
- Label: Rhythm Zone
- Website: Official website

Naoto Kataoka (stylized as NAOTO; born 30 August 1983) is a Japanese dancer, actor, rapper and creative director. He is a performer (dancer) of J-Pop dance and vocal group Exile, and is a leader and performer (dancer) of J-Pop dance and vocal group Sandaime J Soul Brothers. He was also a member of Nidaime J Soul Brothers until their migration to Exile in 2009. In 2016, he formed hip hop unit Honest Boyz with his friend Nigo and other members. As a member of Sandaime J Soul Brothers, he has received the Japan Record Awards twice, and received the same award third times as Exile's member. Naoto has acted in a few TV dramas and films and he has become a regular guest on TBS's popular variety show Ningen Kansatsu Variety Monitoring since April 2016. Furthermore, he launched his own fashion brand Studio Seven in 2015 and has been working as the creative director for the brand since then. In 2017, he was appointed as the director for LDH Apparel, a subsidiary of his management company LDH.

On 14 February 2020, Naoto opened his own YouTube channel EXILE NAOTO HONEST TV.

== Early life ==
Naoto Kataoka was born on 30 August 1983, in Tokorozawa, Saitama Prefecture, Japan. He played baseball in junior high school, but stopped doing so after he went to Saitama Prefectural Tokorozawa High School. At one point in his youth he considered being a comedian and formed a comedy trio, "Jinsei Honoji-gumi", with friends.

Naoto started dancing in high school at age 17 after he joined the Dance Club of his school. After he became the leader of his dance club in his third year of high school, he became serious about starting a career as a dancer. Once Naoto graduated, he spent all his time improving his dancing skill, formed the dance team JAZZ DRUG in 2003, which consisted of two male members (Naoto and Nabe) and one female member (Maiko), and started to become active in a wide range of events. In 2004, Naoto went to Los Angeles and New York to take lessons from famous choreographer Andre Fuentes, who had choreographed for famous artists including Britney Spears. During his time in the US, Naoto performed at The Carnival.

== Career ==
=== Early Days: Backup dancer and the dance quintet Scream ===
After returning to Japan he served as a backup dancer for artists such as Ayumi Hamasaki, Ai, Bennie K and Maki Goto, appearing both in the music videos of these artists and at their concerts. He also served as a backup dancer at Japanese concerts for western artists such as Ashanti and Missy Elliott.

In February 2006, Naoto formed the dance quintet Scream with some of his friends. One of the Scream members was U-YEAH, who got his stage name from Naoto and later became a member of J-Pop group DA PUMP. They performed at many clubs and events in Tokyo and were popular in the underground dance world.

=== 2007–2009: Nidaime J Soul Brothers ===
In 2007, Naoto was invited to join the revival of the group J Soul Brothers, Nidaime J Soul Brothers(The Second Generation of J Soul Brothers), together with Naoki Kobayashi as a performer after the group's producer Hiro decided that they should be a seven-member group. Naoto started using NAOTO as his stage name and performed as a member of Nidaime J Soul Brothers for the first time at COLOR LIVE TOUR 2007 BLUE on 10 November 2007.

On 7 May 2008, Nidaime J Soul Brothers released their first single "WE!", which was sold exclusively on Exile's mobile website. Meanwhile, Naoto made his actor debut in Gekidan Exile's 2nd show CROWN ~Nemuranai, Yoru no Hate ni…~ in May. Afterwards, the group went on a nation-wide small-scale tour, the so-called Musha Shugyo ("Samurai training") from October to November, during which the members traveled on a bus and put on 48 shows in 2 months around the country. From 29 November to December, the group also took part in Exile Live Tour Exile Perfect Live 2008.

On 25 February 2009, Nidaime J Soul Brothers released their first album, J Soul Brothers, debuting at No.1 on the Oricon Albums Chart on the first day of its release. At the same time, Naoto made his major debut in the music industry.

=== 2009–present: Exile and Sandaime J Soul Brothers ===
On 1 March 2009, as Nidaime J Soul Brothers announced their indefinite hiatus and all members migrated to Exile, Naoto joined Exile. From 1 November, co-starring with Exile's group-mate Kenchi Tachibana, his first TV drama Genryō Boxer started to be released on mobile streaming website BeeTV. Naoto played Susumu Kitaooji, a young boxer who appreciated and looked for delicious food. At the end of the year, he appeared on the stage of NHK Kohaku Uta Gassen for the first time as a member of Exile.

On 19 July 2010, Naoto was announced as member and one of the leaders of Sandaime J Soul Brothers, a new revival of J Soul Brothers, while staying as a member of Exile at the same time. On 27 September, Naoto appeared and performed first time as a member of Sandaime J Soul Brothers on the stage of Exile's Live FANTASY After Night Festival ～EXILE Soul～. On 10 November, he debuted in Sandaime J Soul Brothers with the single, "Best Friend's Girl". Besides, on 18 September, he debuted on the television screen with Okagesamade!, a TV special directed by Yukihiko Tsutsumi and dedicated to the 60th anniversary of CBC Television. He also had a guest-star role in Spec –Keishichōkōanbu Kōan Daigoka: Mishō Jiken Tokubetsu Taisaku-gakari Jiken-bo–, another TV Drama directed by Yukihiko Tsutsumi, in the same year. He played himself in the drama and promoted Exile's best-of album Exile Catchy Best.

Since April 2013, Naoto played Tomonori Kashiwagi in Fuji TV's drama Last Cinderella. He learned the necessary skills of a hairstylist from his hairstylist friends for the role. Since July, Frenemy~Rumble of the Rat~, a TV drama co-starred by Naoto and Shokichi, began to broadcast on NTV. Naoto starred as Wataru Okajima, a childhood friend of Shokichi's character.

Since April 2014, Naoto had become one of the Tuesday hosts of Fuji TV's variety show High Noon TV Viking. He appeared on the show every two weeks, as he and Takahiro, one of the vocalists of Exile, took turns to be the Tuesday host. Takahiro quit the job in March 2015, and Naoto continued to become the only Tuesday host for the show until March 2016. He also debuted on the big screen in the movie Sakurasaku, which was released on 5 April 2014.

In 2015, Naoto starred with Sayaka Akimoto in the movie Akai Kurumaisu("Mango and the Red Wheelchair")，playing Shota Igarashi，a rock band's lead singer who lost lose the use of his legs because of illness. He lost 7 kilos for his role and showed his vocal abilities for the first time for the movie. On 20 June 2015, Naoto made his debut as a voice actor for the animated movie Ghost in the Shell: The New Movie, starring Osamu Fujimoto, the aide of the fictional Japanese Prime Minister featured in the film. He stated that it was a huge honour for him to have such a role since he had been a fan of the series since his childhood.

Since 15 April 2016, TV drama Night Hero Naoto started to be broadcast, in which Naoto starred as himself. The drama go back and forth between reality and fiction by showcasing Naoto with a full-time job as a performer in Exile/Sandaime J Soul Brothers, while he had a part-time job as an underground hero. Other Exile Tribe members also made guest appearances as themselves. The ending of the drama were 12 dances movies(one for each episode) that featured Naoto dancing with several world-famous dancers and choreographers such as s**t kingz, Akanen, Riehata and many Exile Tribe members. Taking the opportunity of the drama, Naoto formed the hip-hop unit Honest Boyz together with Nigo and became one of their rappers and the leader. This was the first time that Naoto showed his vocal abilities in a group. The unit debuted with the song "PART TIME HERO"，which was used as the opening theme of Night Hero Naoto. He has also become a regular guest on TBS's popular Variety show Ningen Kansatsu Variety Monitoring since April 2016.

On 19 August 2017, the third movie of the High&Low franchise, High&Low The Movie 2 / End of Sky, was released. Naoto played Jessie, King of the Prison, who was just released from prison and led his Prison Gang to the war in the world of High&Low franchise. He reprised his role in High&Low The Movie 3 / Final Mission, the fourth movie of the High&Low franchise.

In 2019, Naoto and Honest Boyz made their international debut with their new song "Electricity featuring Lil Uzi Vert", which was selected as the ending song of Hollywood's live-action movie "Pokémon Detective Pikachu". In September, the Internet-drama Busunohitominikoishiteru 2019 ～The Voice～ began airing, in which Naoto starred as the popular voice actor Suzuno Osamu. He also played his first starring role in a movie in Dancing Mary directed by SABU. The fantasy-romance depicts the story of an impoverished civil servant called Kenji (played by Naoto), who gets asked by Mary, a ghost of a dancer trapped in a dance hall which would soon be demolished, to look for her lover Johnny. The film had its world premiere at the Sitges Film Festival in Spain on 10 October 2019.

On 14 February 2020, Naoto opened his own YouTube channel EXILE NAOTO HONEST TV, sharing his wide ranges of interests to the world. On 14 and 15 February, he took part in Hero Yo Yasuraka ni Nemure, one of LDH's brand new reading drama BOOK ACT. On August 7, he released his first digital single O・Y/YUM YUM with stage named HONEST BOY(Naoto means honest boy in Japanese). He also starred alongside Tao Tsuchiya in the film Food Luck as Sato Yoshito, a freelance writer who embarks on a food journey to find the flavors of home. The film was released on November 20.

== Business ==
=== Studio Seven ===
On October 26, 2015, Naoto announced that he launched his apparel brand STUDIO SEVEN .

STUDIO SEVEN is Naoto's own apparel brand. It was named STUDIO SEVEN because as someone who works in the music industry, Naoto has a closed relationship with studios, so it was natural for him to use the word in the name of his brand, while the word "seven" came from the fact that Sandaime J Soul Brothers, the group Naoto belongs to, has seven members. Prior to its establishment in 2015, he had expressed his commitment and love for fashion several times. His brand focuses on unisex street wear and has three characteristic motives: a mouth with red lips representing "Love", a blue rose representing "Dream" and a smiley representing "Happiness". These three motives are an homage to the company Naoto is signed to, LDH. Moreover, the smiley face used as an icon for Studio Seven's designs is called "Mr.Confused". Naoto designed it with the intention to symbolize the discrepancy of anonymous individuals posting negative words and slander on the Internet while never knowing their actual situation, real face and true emotions. This 'darkness of modern times' transforms the smiley face, a symbol of absolute happiness, into something confusing.

In March 2019, a GU×STUDIO SEVEN collaboration collection was released. Furthermore, Naoto and Nigo's brand HUMAN MADE often collaborate since both creative directors are friends. STUDIO SEVEN currently owns an online shop and the flag shop STUDIO SEVEN NAKAMEGURO in Aobadai Meguro-Ku Tokyo. The brand is also sold at the select shop Just One Eye in Los Angeles.

In March 2020, a HUNTING WORLD×STUDIO SEVEN collaboration collection was released.

In 2020, two New Blance sneakers produced in collaboration with STUDIO SEVEN and mita sneakers was released.

==== HONESTBOY® ====
STUDIO SEVEN has a diffusion line named HONESTBOY® , which is named after Naoto himself, as Naoto (直人) can mean Honest Boy in Japanese.

In May, a JOJO × HONESTBOY® ZIPPER SLEEVE HOODIE was released as a part of ZOZOTOWN's Tokyo Department Store's collaboration with TV Anime JoJo's Bizarre Adventure: Golden Wind. Naoto is a great fan of the JoJo's Bizarre Adventure series, and the hoodie is designed with the inspiration from Golden Wind's character Bruno Bucciarati.

On 12 October 2019, HONESTBOY® and Japanese creative designer VERDY released a collaboration collection titled HONEST DELI as part of Verdy Harajuku Day festival. Intended to be sold at cafés, the collection combines food culture and fashion and includes items that can be used at home as well as clothes, so that it can be incorporated into everyday life. Verdy and Naoto had met each other for the first time at ComplexCon in Los Angeles 3 years prior to their first collaboration. They became friends and since both of them are influenced by Harajuku culture from the 90s and use a smiley face in their designs, they planned on working together in the future.

=== LDH Apparel ===
On 1 January 2017, Naoto became director of LDH Apparel, a sub-company of LDH.

== Other ==
On 14 July 2015, Naoto released his first photobook Jinsei Honoji-gumi. The title derives from the name of the comedy-unit he formed in high school.

== Personal life ==
Naoto's mother is an English teacher, and his father was an office worker. Influenced by his son, Naoto's father became an actor after retirement.

On 25 September 2019, it was reported that Naoto has been dating popular announcer Ayako Kato for at least one year. Both parties confirmed the news. In August 2020, it was reported they broke up after a long period of not being able to see each other due to the COVID-19 pandemic.

== Participating groups ==
Name	Period of time
Jazz Drug	February 2003 – unknown
Scream	February 2006 – unknown
Nidaime J Soul Brothers	10 November 2007 – 1 March 2009
Exile	1 March 2009 –
Sandaime J Soul Brothers	10 November 2010 –
Honest Boyz	April 2016 –

== Filmography ==
※His roles in bold are his starring works

=== TV dramas ===
Year	Title	Role	Network	Notes	Ref.
2010	Okagesamade!	**Tatsuhiko Kato**	CBC		
2010	Spec –Keishichōkōanbu Kōan Daigoka: Mishō Jiken Tokubetsu Taisaku-gakari Jiken-bo–	Himself	TBS	Episode 8	
2013	Last Cinderella	Tomonori Kashiwagi	Fuji TV		
2013	Frenemy: Dobunezumi no Machi	**Wataru Okajima**	NTV	Co-starring with Shokichi	
2014	Dear Sister	Kuwana	Fuji TV	Episode 10	
2016	Night Hero Naoto	**Naoto**	TV Tokyo		

=== Internet dramas ===
Year	Title	Role	Website	Notes	Ref.
2009	Genryō Boxer	**Susumu Kitaooji**	Bee TV	Co-starring with Kenchi Tachibana	
2019	Busu no Hitomi ni Koishiteru 2019 ～The Voice～ (ブスの瞳に恋してる 2019 ～The Voice～)	**Suzuno Osamu**	FOD (Fuji TV on Demand)		

=== Films ===
Year	Title	Role	Notes	Ref.
2014	Sakurasaku	Omori		
2015	Mango and The Red Wheelchair (Mango to Akai Kurumaisu)	Shota Igarashi		
2017	High&Low The Movie 2 / End Of Sky	Jesse		
2017	High&Low The Movie 3 / Final Mission	Jesse		
2019	Dancing Mary	Kenji Fujimoto	Release in 2021	
2020	Food Luck	Yoshito		
2027	High&Low: The New World			

=== Stage ===
Year	Title	Role	Notes
2008	Crown Nemuranai Yoru no Hate ni...		
2009	Atakku No.1	Soldier Kanichi Yokokawa, Chief of Staff Sergeant Katsushiro Kashida	
2009	Sono Tettō ni Otoko-tachi wa iru to iu	Kiyuki	
2010	Moshimo Kimi ga.	**Yumoto**	
2010	Night Ballet	**Azuma**	
2010	Dance Earth: Negai	Kazu	
2013	Guitar o Machinagara –Yatta ze! Honda Special–		
2013	Atakku No.1	Sergeant Kashiwada Kashiwada	
2020	Hero Yo Yasuraka ni Nemure		Book Act

=== Voice Acting ===
Year	Title	Role	Ref.
2015	Ghost in the Shell: The New Movie	Osamu Fujimoto	

=== TV programmes ===
Year	Title	Network	Notes	Ref.
2013	EX-LOUNGE	TBS		
2014	EXILE Casino		Regular	
2014–2016	Viking	Fuji TV	Tuesday MC	
2016–present	Ningen Kansatsu Variety: Monitoring	TBS	Regular	
2017	Netchū hito (熱中人)	Fuji TV	MC	
2018	Aitsu ima nani shi teru? (あいつ今なにしてる?; What are you doing now?)	TV Asahi	guest	

=== Advertisements ===
Year	Title	Ref.
2012	GREE "Seisen Cerberus"	
2012	Fujitsu Arrows	
2016	SoftBank "Sponach Live"	
2019	Magnum Dry "Magnum Dry Returned"	
2019	Universal Studio Japan Halloween event 2019	

=== Music videos ===
Year	Title	Artist	Notes
2003	Better Days	Bennie K	
2005	My Name's Women	Ayumi Hamasaki	
2005	Fairyland	Ayumi Hamasaki	
2006	Startin'	Ayumi Hamasaki	
2006	Blue Bird	Ayumi Hamasaki	
2006	Beautiful Fighters		
2006	Glass no Pumps	Maki Goto	
2006	Some Boys! Touch	Maki Goto	
2006	I Wanna Know	Ai	
2007	Getting Funky!	Jyongri	
2014	Happy	Pharrell Williams	Japan Edition
2016	Yeah!! Yeah!! Yeah!!	Exile The Second	
2017	Kokoro	Kobukuro	
2018	Red Soul Blue Dragon	Red Diamond Dogs	

=== Live videos ===
Year	Title	Artist
2006	Maki Goto Secret Live at Studio Coast	Maki Goto
2007	Maki Goro Live Tour 2006 –G-Emotion–	Maki Goto
	Maki Goto Secret Live-Ekizona Disco	Maki Goto

=== Magazine serialisations ===
Title	Notes
Numéro Tokyo	Occasional series

== Bibliography ==
=== Photo essays ===
Year	Title	ISBN	Ref.
2015	Jinsei Honoji-gumi (人生ほの字組)	ISBN 978-4908200038	
