= Itoshiki Tomo e =

- Front cover of regular edition.

Single by Morning Musume Tanjō 10nen Kinentai
- Released: August 8, 2007 (CD, JP); August 22, 2007 (Single V, JP)
- Recorded: 2007
- Genre: Japanese pop
- Label: Zetima Records; EPCE-5489~90 (CD+DVD); EPCE-5491 (regular edition); EPBE-5260 (Single V)
- Songwriters: Kanako Oda; Miki Igarashi
- Producer: Tsunku

Morning Musume Tanjō 10nen Kinentai singles chronology
"Bokura ga Ikiru My Asia" (2007)	"Itoshiki Tomo e" (2007)

Limited edition with DVD
- Front cover of limited edition.

Single V
- Front cover of Single V.

"Itoshiki Tomo e" (愛しき悪友へ, To My Beloved Companion) is the second single of Morning Musume's tenth anniversary team Morning Musume Tanjō 10nen Kinentai. It was released on August 8, 2007, while the Single V DVD was released on August 22.

The CD single had two editions: a limited edition containing a bonus DVD, and the regular edition containing one photocard that was only available on its first press. A Single V was also released.

It reached number 15 on the Oricon Charts in Japan.

== Track listings ==
=== CD single ===
1. "Itoshiki Tomo e" (愛しき悪友へ, To My Beloved Companion)
2. "Michi Naru Mirai e" (未知なる未来へ)
3. "Itoshiki Tomo e" (Instrumental)

=== Single V DVD ===
1. "Itoshiki Tomo e"
2. "Itoshiki Tomo e" (5-shot Version)
3. "Making of" (メイキング映像)

== Musical personnel ==
- Kaori Iida – vocals
- Natsumi Abe – vocals
- Maki Goto – vocals, chorus
- Risa Niigaki – vocals, chorus
- Koharu Kusumi – vocal

=== Itoshiki Tomo e ===
- Kanako Oda (小田佳奈子) – lyricist
- Tak Matsumoto (松本孝弘; of B'z) – composer and guitar (courtesy of Vermillion Records)
- Yuichi Takahashi (高橋諭一) – arrangement, programming, and guitar
- Daisuke Ikeda (池田大介) – arrangement, programming, and keyboards
- Koichi Terasawa (寺沢功一; of Rider Chips) – bass
- Jun Aoyama – drums
- Kazuki Katsuta (勝田かず樹; of Dimension) – saxophone (courtesy of Zain Records)

=== Michi Naru Mirai e ===
- Miki Igarashi (五十嵐美貴; of Show-Ya) – lyricist, composer, guitar, and chorus
- Daisuke Ikeda – arrangement, programming, and keyboards
- Hideyuki "Daichi" Suzuki (鈴木Daichi秀行) – arrangement, programming, and guitar
- Satomi Senba (仙波さとみ; of Show-Ya) – bass and chorus
- Jun Aoyama – drums

== Performances ==
- 2007-08-03 – Music Japan
- 2007-08-12 – Haromoni@
- 2007-08-25 – Melodix
