= Ren'ai Sentai Shitsuranger =

Single by Nochiura Natsumi
- Released: (Japan) October 6, 2004
- Recorded: 2004
- Genre: Japanese pop
- Label: (Japan) Zetima
- Producer(s): Tsunku

Limited edition CD
- Front cover of the limited edition CD.

"Ren'ai Sentai Shitsuranger" (恋愛戦隊シツレンジャー, Ren'ai Sentai Shitsurenjā, "Love Squadron Broken-Heart Ranger") is the only single released by Nochiura Natsumi, a grouping of three Hello! Project soloists. It was released on October 6, 2004 in both regular (EPCE-5338) and limited (EPCE-5337) editions under the Zetima label. The first press of the regular edition came with a photo card and the limited edition came with four photo cards. A Single V DVD (EPBE-5150) was released afterwards and also came with a photo card.

The song and accompanying music video pay homage to Toei Company's Super Sentai series. On some live performances, Nochiura Natsumi were accompanied by suit actors from the 2004 Super Sentai series Tokusou Sentai Dekaranger.

There is a rearranged solo version of this song on Maki Goto's 3rd Station album.

The song reached the 4th place on TBS's Top 100 weekly countdown show Count Down TV.

== Track listing ==
=== CD ===
1. "Ren'ai Sentai Shitsuranger" (恋愛戦隊シツレンジャー, Ren'ai Sentai Shitsurenjā, "Love Squadron Shitsu Ranger")
2. "Love Like Crazy"
3. "Ren'ai Sentai Shitsuranger (Instrumental)"

=== DVD ===
1. "Ren'ai Sentai Shitsuranger"
2. "Love Like Crazy"
3. "Making of" (メイキング映像)

== Concert performances ==
- Matsuura Aya Concert Tour 2005 Haru 101kaime no Kiss ~Hand in Hand~ (by Aya Matsuura and Melon Kinenbi)
- Nochiura Natsumi Concert Tour 2005 Haru "Triangle Energy"
- Abe Natsumi Concert Tour 2005 Aki ~24 Carat~ (by Natsumi Abe with Country Musume as background dancers)
- Hello☆Pro On Stage! 2007 'Rock desu yo!' (by Maki Goto & Melon Kinenbi)
- Hello! Project 2008 Winter ~Wonderful Hearts Nenjū Mu Kyū~
