= The Masked Singer Japan =

- Genre: Reality competition
- Presented by: Yo Oizumi
- Starring: Perfume; Miyavi; Kiko Mizuhara; Bakarhythm; Kazuya Kojima
- Country of origin: Japan
- Original language: Japanese
- No. of seasons: 2
- No. of episodes: 18

Production
- Production company: The Works Co. Ltd. (Note: A subsidiary of Watanabe Productions.)

Original release
- Network: Amazon Prime Video
- Release: September 3, 2021 – August 25, 2022

The Masked Singer Japan is a Japanese reality singing competition show that is based on the South Korean television series King of Mask Singer. The series premiered on September 3, 2021, on Amazon Prime Video in Japan. The show features celebrities singing popular songs while wearing head-to-toe costumes and face masks concealing their identities. It employs panelists who guess the celebrities' identities by interpreting clues provided to them throughout the series.

== Overview ==
=== Production ===
In May 2021, it was announced that Amazon had greenlit an order for The Masked Singer to be produced and air on Amazon Prime Video Japan as an exclusive on that site. The show was confirmed to be streamed in September 2021 after being filming completed in February 2021. In-show narration is provided by voice actor, Subaru Kimura.

=== Panelists and host ===
TV personality Yo Oizumi was announced as the main host of the program, while the announced panelists consist of Japanese girl group Perfume, guitarist Miyavi, model Kiko Mizuhara and comedian Bakarhythm. Guest panelists included actor Kazuya Kojima for the third and fourth episodes, comedian Hiroaki Ogi for the fifth and sixth episodes, and comedian Hidetsugu Shibata for the seventh and eighth episodes.

== Series overview ==
Series overview
Series	Contestants	Episodes	Originally released		Winner	Runner-up	Third place
Series	Contestants	Episodes	First released	Last released	Winner	Runner-up	Third place
1	12	9	3 September 2021	15 October 2021	Anna Tsuchiya as "Bird"	Crystal Kay as "Miss Television"	Miki Mizuno as "Rose"
2	12	9	4 August 2022	25 August 2022	Maki Goto as "Venus"	Ahn Mika as "Umbrella"	Koji Yamamoto as "Hero"

== Season 1 ==
Results
Stage Name	Celebrity	Occupation	Episodes								
Stage Name	Celebrity	Occupation	1	2	3	4	5	6	7	8	9
Bird (Tori)	Anna Tsuchiya	Singer	RISK			SAFE	SAFE		SAFE	SAFE	WINNER
Miss Television (Misu Terebi)	Crystal Kay	Singer	WIN			SAFE		SAFE	SAFE	SAFE	RUNNER-UP
Rose (Rōzu)	Miki Mizuno	Actress		WIN	SAFE		SAFE		SAFE	SAFE	THIRD
Renjishi (Ren Shishi)	Tomotaka Okamoto	Opera singer	WIN		SAFE		SAFE		SAFE	OUT	
Neon Panda (Neonpanda)	Minami Minegishi	Singer		WIN	SAFE			SAFE	SAFE	OUT	
Ninja	Tsukasa Saito	Comedian		RISK		SAFE		SAFE	OUT		
Wolf (Ōkami)	Takeru Segawa	Kickboxer		WIN		SAFE		OUT			
Escargot (Esukarugo)	Sachiko Kobayashi	Singer	WIN		SAFE		OUT				
Ika King (Ikakingu)	Sunplaza Nakano-kun	Singer		RISK		OUT					
T-Rex (T-Rekkusu)	Show Aikawa	Actor	RISK		OUT						
Amabie	Saori Yoshida	Freestyle wrestler		OUT							
Dragon3	Ukon Onoe II	Kabuki actor	OUT								

The masked singer won their face-off and remained in the competition.
The masked singer was safe from elimination.
The masked singer lost their face-off and was in the bottom three, but was not eliminated.
The masked singer was eliminated from the competition and unmasked upon their elimination.
The masked singer did not perform.

== Episodes ==
=== Week 1 (September 3) ===
Performances on the first episode
#	Stage name	Song	Identity	Result
1	Dragon3	"Saudade" by Porno Graffitti	Ukon Onoe II	OUT
2	Miss Television	"Evolution" by Ayumi Hamasaki	undisclosed	WIN
3	Escargot	"Gurenge" by LiSA	undisclosed	WIN
4	Bird	"Desire (Jōnetsu)" by Akina Nakamori	undisclosed	RISK
5	T-Rex	"Stay Dream" by Tsuyoshi Nagabuchi	undisclosed	RISK
6	Renjishi	"Kurenai" by X Japan	undisclosed	WIN

Performances on the second episode
#	Stage name	Song	Identity	Result
1	Neon Panda	"Ren'ai Revolution 21" by Morning Musume	undisclosed	WIN
2	Ika King	"Yellow Yellow Happy" by Pocket Biscuits	undisclosed	RISK
3	Ninja	"Excite" by Daichi Miura	undisclosed	RISK
4	Rose	"Love Is Over" by Ouyang Fei Fei	undisclosed	WIN
5	Wolf	"The Beginning" by One Ok Rock	undisclosed	WIN
6	Amabie	"A Cruel Angel's Thesis" by Yoko Takahashi	Saori Yoshida	OUT

Performances on the third episode
#	Stage name	Song	Identity	Result
1	Neon Panda	"Yeah! Meccha Holiday" by Aya Matsuura	undisclosed	SAFE
2	Rose	"Pride" by Miki Imai	undisclosed	SAFE
3	T-Rex	"Kanzen Muketsu no Rock'n'Roller" by Aladdin	Show Aikawa	OUT
4	Escargot	"Ito" by Miyuki Nakajima	undisclosed	SAFE
5	Renjishi	"Homura" by LiSA	undisclosed	SAFE

=== Week 2 (September 10) ===
Performances on the fourth episode
#	Stage name	Song	Identity	Result
1	Miss Television	"Itoshisa to Setsunasa to Kokoro Zuyosa to" by Ryōko Shinohara	undisclosed	SAFE
2	Ika King	"Tiger & Dragon" by Crazy Ken Band	Sunplaza Nakano-kun	OUT
3	Bird	"Tsumi to Batsu" by Ringo Sheena	undisclosed	SAFE
4	Wolf	"Namonaki Uta" by Mr. Children	undisclosed	SAFE
5	Ninja	"Jūnigatsu no Love Song" by Gackt	undisclosed	SAFE

=== Week 3 (September 17) ===
- Group number: "Joyful" by Ikimonogakari

Performances on the fifth episode
#	Stage name	Song	Identity	Result
1	Escargot	"Roppongi Shinju" by Ann Lewis	Sachiko Kobayashi	OUT
2	Rose	"Mata Kimi ni Koishiteru" by Fuyumi Sakamoto	undisclosed	SAFE
3	Renjishi	"Aijou" by Yuki Koyanagi	undisclosed	SAFE
4	Bird	"Gekkō" by Chihiro Onitsuka	undisclosed	SAFE

=== Week 4 (September 24) ===
- Group number: "Memeshikute" by Golden Bomber

Performances on the sixth episode
#	Stage name	Song	Identity	Result
1	Neon Panda	"Ikuze! Kaitō Shōjo" by Momoiro Clover Z	undisclosed	SAFE
2	Wolf	"366 Nichi" by HY	Takeru Segawa	OUT
3	Ninja	"Takane no Hanako-san" by Back Number	undisclosed	SAFE
4	Miss Television	"Ride on the Silver Dragon's Back" by Miyuki Nakajima	undisclosed	SAFE

=== Week 5 (October 1) ===
Performances on the seventh episode
#	Stage name	Song	Identity	Result
1	Miss Television	"Friends" by Rebecca	undisclosed	SAFE
2	Rose	"Cat's Eye" by Anri	undisclosed	SAFE
3	Ninja	"If…" by Da Pump	Tsukasa Saito	OUT
4	Bird	"Genkai Lovers" by Show-Ya	undisclosed	SAFE
5	Renjishi	"Flavor of Life" by Hikaru Utada	undisclosed	SAFE
6	Neon Panda	"Flying Get" by AKB48	undisclosed	SAFE

=== Week 6 (October 8) - Semifinal ===
Performances on the eighth episode
#	Stage name	Song	Identity	Result
1	Miss Television	"Manatsu no Yo no Yume" by Yumi Matsutoya	undisclosed	SAFE
2	Neon Panda	"Akai Sweet Pea" by Seiko Matsuda	Minami Minegishi	OUT
3	Renjishi	"Wataridori" by Alexandros	Tomotaka Okamoto	OUT
4	Rose	"Ai wa Katsu" by KAN	undisclosed	SAFE
5	Bird	"Anata no kisu o kazoemashô – You Were Mine" by Yuki Koyanagi	undisclosed	SAFE

=== Week 7 (October 15) - Finale ===
- Group number: "One Night Carnival" by Kishidan

Performances on the ninth episode
#	Stage name	Song	Identity	Result
1	Miss Television	"Mayonaka no Door (Stay With Me)" by Miki Matsubara	Crystal Kay	RUNNER-UP
2	Rose	"Kiseki o Nozomu Nara..." by Juju	Miki Mizuno	THIRD
3	Bird	"Forever Love" by X Japan	Anna Tsuchiya	WINNER

== Season 2 ==
Results
Stage name	Celebrity	Occupation	Episodes								
Stage name	Celebrity	Occupation	1	2	3	4	5	6	7	8	9
Venus (Kinboshi)	Maki Goto	Singer	SAFE			SAFE	SAFE		SAFE	SAFE	WINNER
Umbrella (Kasa)	Ahn Mika	Model	SAFE		SAFE			SAFE	SAFE	SAFE	RUNNER-UP
Hero (Hīrō)	Koji Yamamoto	Actor		SAFE	SAFE		SAFE		SAFE	SAFE	THIRD
Crepe (Kurēpu)	Shoko Nakagawa	Singer		SAFE		SAFE		SAFE	SAFE	OUT	
Knight (Kishi)	Chris Hart	Singer		SAFE		SAFE		SAFE	SAFE	OUT	
Takopuri	Ryō Katō	Actor		SAFE	SAFE		SAFE		OUT		
Diver (Daibā)	Tetsuya Bessho	Actor	SAFE		SAFE			OUT			
Lamb (Kohitsuji) (WC)	Yu Yamada	Model				SAFE	OUT				
Rabbit (Usagi)	Daisuke Yokoyama	Singer	SAFE			OUT					
Twinstars (Tsuinsutā)	Vamyun	YouTubers	SAFE		OUT						
Spider (Kumo)	Reiko Shiota	Badminton player		OUT							
Benkei	Mandy Sekiguchi	Dancer	OUT								

== Episodes ==
=== Week 1 (August 4) ===
Performances on the first episode
#	Stage name	Song	Identity	Result
1	Rabbit	"Zenzenzense" by Radwimps	undisclosed	SAFE
2	Twinstars	"Kibun Joujou" by Mitsuyuki Miyake	undisclosed	SAFE
2	Twinstars	"Kibun Joujou" by Mitsuyuki Miyake	undisclosed	SAFE
3	Venus	"Hide & Seek" by Namie Amuro	undisclosed	SAFE
4	Umbrella	"Taxi" by Daisuke Inoue	undisclosed	SAFE
5	Benkei	"Rising Sun" by Exile	Mandy Sekiguchi	OUT
6	Diver	"Amazing Grace"	undisclosed	SAFE

Performances on the second episode
#	Stage name	Song	Identity	Result
1	Crepe	"Yoru ni Kakeru" by Yoasobi	undisclosed	SAFE
2	Hero	"Inferno" by Mrs. GREEN APPLE	undisclosed	SAFE
3	Knight	"The Greatest Show" from The Greatest Showman	undisclosed	SAFE
4	Spider	"Glamorous Sky" by Hyde	Reiko Shiota	OUT
5	Takopuri	"Matsuken Samba 2" by Akira Miyagawa	undisclosed	SAFE

Performances on the third episode
#	Stage name	Song	Identity	Result
1	Hero	"Yuuwaku" by Glay	undisclosed	SAFE
3	Takopuri	"Usseewa" by Ado	undisclosed	SAFE
2	Twinstars	"Koi Oto to Amazora" by AAA	Vamyun	OUT
4	Umbrella	"Tattoo" by Anri Sekine	undisclosed	SAFE
5	Diver	"Surfin' U.S.A." by The Beach Boys	undisclosed	SAFE

=== Week 2 (August 11) ===
Performances on the fourth episode
#	Stage name	Song	Identity	Result
1	Venus	"Tamashii Revolution" by Superfly	undisclosed	SAFE
2	Rabbit	"Kaitou" by Back Number	Daisuke Yokoyama	OUT
3	Crepe	"Akeboshi" by LiSA	undisclosed	SAFE
4	Knight	"Evening Primrose" by Novelbright	undisclosed	SAFE
5	Lamb	"Yasashii Kiss Wo Shite" by Dreams Come True	undisclosed	SAFE

- Group Performance: "Love Machine" by Morning Musume

Performances on the fifth episode
#	Stage name	Song	Identity	Result
1	Takopuri	"Katte ni Sindbad" by Southern All Stars	undisclosed	SAFE
2	Venus	"be alive" by Yuki Koyanagi	undisclosed	SAFE
3	Lamb	"Lum's Love Song" by Yuko Matsutani	Yu Yamada	OUT
4	Hero	"Shirusi" by Mr. Children	undisclosed	SAFE

=== Week 3 (August 18) ===
- Group Performance: "Zenroyku Shounen" by Sukima Switch

Performances on the sixth episode
#	Stage name	Song	Identity	Result
1	Diver	"Hotel Pacific" by Southern All Stars	Tetsuya Bessho	OUT
2	Crepe	"Cry Baby" by Official Hige Dandism	undisclosed	SAFE
3	Umbrella	"Mikazuki" by Ayaka	undisclosed	SAFE
4	Knight	"Butter" by BTS	undisclosed	SAFE

Performances on the seventh episode
#	Stage name	Song	Identity	Result
1	Takopuri	"Nandakanda" by Takashi Fujii	Ryō Katō	OUT
2	Venus	"Fragile" by Every Little Thing	undisclosed	SAFE
3	Umbrella	"White Breath" by Takanori Nishikawa	undisclosed	SAFE
4	Crepe	"Tamashī no Rufuran" by Yoko Takahashi	undisclosed	SAFE
5	Knight	"Mela!" by Ryokuoushoku Shakai	undisclosed	SAFE
6	Hero	"The Power of Love" by Huey Lewis and the News	undisclosed	SAFE

=== Week 4 (August 25) ===
Performances on the eighth episode
#	Stage name	Song	Identity	Result
1	Knight	"Blue Bird" by Ikimonogakari	Chris Hart	OUT
2	Crepe	"Haru wo Tsugeru" by Yama	Shoko Nakagawa	OUT
3	Umbrella	"Sukiyaki" by Kyu Sakamoto	undisclosed	SAFE
4	Venus	"Rule" by Ayumi Hamasaki	undisclosed	SAFE
5	Hero	"Melody" by Kōji Tamaki	undisclosed	SAFE

- Group Performance: "La La La Love Song" by Toshinobu Kubota

Performances on the ninth episode
#	Stage name	Song	Identity	Result
1	Hero	"Marionette" by Kyosuke Himuro	Koji Yamamoto	THIRD
2	Umbrella	"For You..." by Mariko Takahashi	Ahn Mika	RUNNER-UP
3	Venus	"Go! Go! Heaven!" by Speed	Maki Goto	WINNER
