= Ima ni Kitto... In My Life =

Single by Maki Goto
- Released: 25 January 2006
- Recorded: 2005
- Genre: J-pop
- Label: Piccolo Town
- Songwriter(s): Tsunku
- Producer(s): Tsunku

Maki Goto singles chronology
"Suppin to Namida" (2005)	"Ima ni Kitto... In My Life" (2006)	"Glass no Pumps" (2006)

"Ima ni Kitto... In My Life" (今にきっと…In My LIFE, Surely Now... In My Life) is the 14th single by J-pop artist Maki Goto, released on 25 January 2006 with the catalog number PKCP-5060 under the Piccolo Town label. The Single V was released a week later on 1 February, with the catalog number PKBP-5042. The single peaked at #12 on the Oricon weekly singles chart, charting for four weeks.

The title song's theme is "a girl's motivation".

== Track listings ==
All tracks are written by Tsunku; track 2 composed by Hatake.

CD
No.	Title	Arranger	Length
1.	"Ima ni Kitto... In My Life" (今にきっと…In My LIFE, "Surely Now... In My Life")	Shunsuke Suzuki
2.	"Kitto Kareshi ga Dekiru Hōhō" (きっと彼氏が出来る方法, "Certain Way to Get a Boyfriend")	Nao Tanaka
3.	"Ima ni Kitto... In My Life (Instrumental)"

Single V
No.	Title	Length
1.	"Ima ni Kitto... In My Life"
2.	"Ima ni Kitto... In My Life (Close-up Ver.)"
3.	"Making Eizō" (メイキング映像, "Making Of")

== Concert performances ==
- Hello Pro Party! 2006: Maki Goto Captain Kōen
- Hello Pro On Stage! 2007 "Rock Desu yo!" (with Melon Kinenbi)

== Oricon rank and sales ==
Mon	Tue	Wed	Thu	Fri	Sat	Sun	Week Rank	Sales
-	10	13	17	17	25	31	12	17,635
34	44	-	-	-	-	-	60	2,532
-	-	-	-	-	-	-	130	768
-	-	-	-	-	-	-	164	474

Total sales: 21,409
