= Afurechau... Be in Love =

Single by Maki Goto
- Released: September 19, 2001 (JP)
- Recorded: 2001
- Genre: J-pop
- Label: Zetima
- Songwriter(s): Tsunku
- Producer(s): Tsunku

Maki Goto singles chronology
"Ai no Bakayarō" (2001)	"Afurechau... Be in Love" (2001)	"Te o Nigitte Arukitai" (2002)

"Afurechau... Be in Love" (溢れちゃう...BE IN LOVE, Gonna Overflow... Be In Love) is Maki Goto's second single. It was released on September 19, 2001 with the catalog number EPCE-5118.

A remixed version of the song is featured of Goto's first album Makking Gold 1, titled "Afurechau... Be In Love (A Passionate Mix)". A slower re-arrangement of this song, arranged by Yuichi Takahashi, and dubbed the Premium Version, is featured on her first compilation album Goto Maki Premium Best 1. In 2002, an English-language cover ("It Hurts to Be in Love") was recorded by Karyn White for the album Cover Morning Musume Hello! Project!.

== Track listing ==
All tracks are written and composed by Tsunku.

1. "Afurechau... Be in Love" (溢れちゃう...BE IN LOVE, Gonna Overflow... Be In Love)
  - Arrangement: Akira
2. "Like A Game"
  - Arrangement: Hideyuki "Daichi" Suzuki (鈴木Daichi秀行)
3. "Afurechau... Be in Love (Instrumental)"

== Concert performances ==
- Hello! Project 2002 ~Kotoshi mo Sugoizo!~
- Goto Maki First Concert Tour 2003 Haru ~Go! Makking Gold~
- Goto Maki Live Tour 2006 ~G Emotion~

== Oricon ranks and sales ==
Mon	Tue	Wed	Thu	Fri	Sat	Sun	Week rank	Sales
–	2	2	2	2	2	3	2	136,110
3	4	10	10	10	9	8	6	32,650
8	16	15	14	12	11	10	13	13,320
10	10	–	–	–	17	13	16	10,020
11	–	–	–	–	20	–	24	8,100

Total sales: 210,360
