= Secret (Maki Goto song) =

Single by Maki Goto

from the album How to Use Sexy
- B-side: "Inner Child"
- Released: April 11, 2007
- Genre: J-Pop
- Length: 5:14
- Label: Hello! Project
- Songwriter(s): Tsunku
- Producer(s): Tsunku

Maki Goto singles chronology
"Some Boys! Touch" (2006)	"Secret" (2007)

Alternative Covers
- CD+DVD Cover

Alternative Covers
- Single V Cover

"Secret" (シークレット, Shīkuretto) is Maki Goto's 17th single. It was released on April 11, 2007 in both regular (PKCP-5084) and first press (PKCP-5082～3) editions. The Single V DVD was released two weeks later, on April 25, 2007 with the catalog number PKBP-5071.

The c/w of this single, Inner Child, is used in the Showa Era song theater play Yokosuka Story.

== Track listing ==
CD
No.	Title	Lyrics	Music	Arrangements	Length
1.	"Secret (シークレット)"	Tsunku	Tsunku	Nao Tanaka	5:14
2.	"Inner Child (インナーチャイルド)"	Yoko Aki	Tsunku	Kōichi Yuasa	3:40
3.	"Secret (Instrumental)"				5:14

DVD
No.	Title	Length
1.	"Secret (Music Video - Face Version)"

Single V
No.	Title	Length
1.	"Secret (Music Video)"
2.	"Secret (Music Video - Secret Version)"
3.	"Secret (Making Of)"

== Charts and sales ==
=== Oricon ===
Mon	Tue	Wed	Thu	Fri	Sat	Sun	Week Rank	Sales
-	5	7	8	10	9	21	9	11,112
25	39	48	48	-	-	-	54	2,016
49	-	-	-	-	-	-	96	1,325
-	-	-	-	-	-	-	185	408

- Total sales: 14,861

== Release history ==
Country	Date	Format	Label
Japan	April 11, 2007	CD, CD+DVD	Hello! Project
Japan	April 25, 2007	Single V Edition	Hello! Project
Hong Kong	May 10, 2007	CD+DVD	Forward Music
