= Nochiura Natsumi =

Japanese girl group

- L-R: Maki Goto, Natsumi Abe, Aya Matsuura

Background information
- Origin: Tokyo, Japan
- Genres: Pop
- Years active: 2004–2005
- Label: hachama
- Past members: Natsumi Abe; Maki Goto; Aya Matsuura

Nochiura Natsumi (後浦なつみ) was a one-off Hello! Project unit formed in 2004. The members were Maki Goto, Aya Matsuura and Natsumi Abe.

The group was composed of soloists, similar to Gomattou, and released their only single, "Ren'ai Sentai Shitsuranger" (恋愛戦隊シツレンジャー, Ren'ai Sentai Shitsurenjā) "Love Squadron Shitsuranger", on October 6, 2004. It reached 4th place on TBS's Top 100 weekly countdown show Count Down TV. Like Gomattou, the name of the group is a portmanteau of the members' names: "Nochi" (後), an alternate reading of the first character in Maki Goto's surname (後藤), "ura" (浦), the last character in Aya Matsuura's surname (松浦), and Natsumi (なつみ), Abe's first name.

The trio was scheduled to perform together on NHK's 55th Kōhaku Uta Gassen, but Abe was suspended from Hello! Project for plagiarism in December 2004, so Goto and Matsuura had to perform without her. The trio reunited for the "Triangle Energy" concert tour in spring 2005. Both the song itself and in particular the music video for "Ren'ai Sentai Shitsuranger" pay homage to the Japanese Super Sentai franchise. All three members later participated in the similarly themed group Def.Diva.

== Discography ==
#	Title	Release date
1	"Ren'ai Sentai Shitsuranger" (恋愛戦隊シツレンジャー)	2004-10-06

=== DVDs ===
Title	Release date
"Single V "Ren'ai Sentai Shitsuranger" (ングルV「恋愛戦隊シツレンジャー」)	2004-10-27
"Nochiura Natsumi Concert Tour 2005 Haru 'Triangle Energy'" (後浦なつみコンサートツアー2005春｢トライアングルエナジー｣)	2005-08-03

== Concert tour ==
The group had their spring tour starting on April 10, 2005 and ended on May 8, 2005 under the title "Nochiura Natsumi Concert Tour 2005 Haru 'Triangle Energy'". The recording of the May 1 concert on Nakano Sunplaza will be released on DVD on August 3, 2005.
