= Morning Musume Tanjō 10nen Kinentai =

Japanese girl group

- Morning Musume Tanjō 10 Nen Kinentai, 2007.

Background information
- Origin: Tokyo, Japan
- Genres: J-pop
- Years active: 2007
- Labels: Zetima
- Spinoff of: Morning Musume
- Past members: Kaori Iida; Natsumi Abe; Maki Goto; Risa Niigaki; Koharu Kusumi
- Website: www.helloproject.com

Morning Musume Tanjō 10nen Kinentai (モーニング娘。誕生10年記念隊, Morning Musume 10th Anniversary Group) was a Japanese girl group and sub-group of Morning Musume. The group was made up of five past and then-present members of Morning Musume and created to celebrate their 10th anniversary.

== Members ==
- 1st generation: Kaori Iida, Natsumi Abe
- 3rd generation: Maki Goto
- 5th generation: Risa Niigaki
- 7th generation: Koharu Kusumi

== History ==
In early 2007, Morning Musume Tanjō 10nen Kinentai was made. They released a commemorative Single called "Bokura ga Ikiru MY ASIA" (僕らが生きる MY ASIA, We're Alive MY ASIA). Tsunku, the producer of Morning Musume, stated that the members chosen symbolize the grassroots beginning of the group; how they had five members ranging in age from 14-24. Additionally, each member was from an odd generation. On August 8, 2007 they released a second single - which was also their last one - "Itoshiki Tomo e" (愛しき悪友へ, To My Beloved Companion). The group was only active during 2007 for Morning Musume's 10th anniversary.

The group had a concert tour starting on August 11, 2007, ending September 1, 2007, located in six different stadiums. The tour was named Morning Musume Tanjō 10nen Kinentai Concert Tour 2007 Natsu: Thank You My Dearest (モーニング娘。誕生10年記念隊 2007夏 ～サンキュー My Dearest～), and was later released on DVD on November 14, 2007.

== Discography ==
=== Singles ===
No.	Title	Release date
1	Bokura ga Ikiru MY ASIA (僕らが生きる MY ASIA, We're Alive MY ASIA)	January 24, 2007
2	Itoshiki Tomo e (愛しき悪友へ, To My Beloved Companion)	August 8, 2007

=== DVDs ===
No.	Title	Release date
1	Single V Bokura ga Ikiru MY ASIA (シングルV 「僕らが生きる MY ASIA」)	January 24, 2007
2	Single V Itoshiki Tomo e (シングルV 「愛しき悪友へ」)	August 22, 2007
3	Morning Musume Tanjō 10 Nen Kinentai Concert Tour 2007 Natsu: Thank You My Dearest (モーニング娘。誕生10年記念隊 2007夏 ～サンキュー My Dearest～)	November 14, 2007
