= Honest Boyz =

Japanese hip hop group

- Origin: Japan
- Genres: Hip hop
- Years active: 2016–present
- Labels: Rhythm Zone (2016); LDH Music (2017–present)
- Members: Naoto (MC); Verbal (MC); Sway (MC); Mandy (MC); Nigo (DJ)
- Website: ldh.co.jp/eng/management/honest_boyz/

Honest Boyz (stylized in all caps), also HONEST BOYZ®, is a 5-member hip hop group consisting of four MC's and one DJ: Naoto (Exile member and Sandaime J Soul Brothers leader), Verbal (from M-Flo and PKCZ®), Sway (from Doberman Infinity and Gekidan Exile), Mandy (from Exile and Generations) and Nigo.

The group was formed in 2016 and is managed by LDH under the label LDH Music.

== Overview ==
This group made their debut with "Part Time Hero", a theme song of TV Tokyo drama Night Hero Naoto starring Naoto. Their second single "YO!" had been selected as an interlude of the movie High & Low The Movie 2 / End Of Sky. These 2 songs both took up the 1st place on iTunes Top Singles Chart.

On April 17, 2019, it was announced that the unit will make its world debut with the new song "Electricity" featuring Lil Uzi Vert, which was selected as the ending song of Hollywood's live-action movie Pokémon Detective Pikachu for both "the original movie" and "the Japanese version", the song is produced by Pharrell Williams and is scheduled to be released under a major overseas label.

== Members ==
Name	Position	Date of birth	Notes
Naoto	MC and Leader	August 30, 1983 (age 42)	Also a member of Exile and Sandaime J Soul Brothers
Verbal	MC	August 21, 1975 (age 50)	Also a member of M-Flo, PKCZ® and Teriyaki Boyz
Sway	MC	June 9, 1986 (age 39)	Also a member of Doberman Infinity and Gekidan Exile
Mandy	MC	January 25, 1991 (age 35)	Also a member of Exile and Generations
Nigo	DJ	December 23, 1970 (age 55)	Also a member of Teriyaki Boyz

== Discography ==
=== Singles ===
Year	Release date	Title	Chart positions	
Year	Release date	Title	JPN	Hot 100 (Note: Sources for chart positions are as follows: "Sakura feat. Kobukuro",)
2019	March 6	"Sakura" (featuring Kobukuro)	17	57

=== Digital singles ===
Year	Release date	Title
2016	June 25	"Part Time Hero"
2017	November 7	"YO!"
2018	February 5	"HeartBreakerZ" (featuring Crazyboy)
2018	June 16	"Bepping Sound" (featuring Hiroomi Tosaka)
2019		"Electricity" (featuring Lil Uzi Vert)

=== Music videos ===
Year	Title
2018	"Tokyo Dip" (featuring Pharrell Williams)

== Tie-up ==
Song	Tie-Up
"Part Time Hero"	TV Tokyo's Night Hero Naoto theme song
"YO!"	High & Low The Movie 2 / End Of Sky interlude song
"Electricity" (featuring Lil Uzi Vert)	Pokémon Detective Pikachu ending song
