= Dancing Mary =

2019 Sabu film

- Theatrical release poster
- Directed by: Sabu
- Screenplay by: Sabu
- Produced by: Yoichi Shimizu; Chikako Nakabayashi; Osamu Ogahara; Kei Era
- Starring: Naoto; Aina Yamada; Nozomi Bando; Ryo Ishibashi; Kaito Yoshimura
- Cinematography: Hiroo Yanagida
- Edited by: Sabu
- Music by: Junichi Matsumo
- Distributed by: Kiguu
- Release dates: October 9, 2019 (Sitges); November 5, 2021 (Japan)
- Running time: 110 minutes
- Country: Japan
- Language: Japanese

Dancing Mary is a 2019 Japanese fantasy film directed and written by Sabu. It stars Naoto, alongside a supporting cast featuring Aina Yamada, Nozomi Bando, Ryo Ishibashi, and Kaito Yoshimura. After its world premiere at Sitges Film Festival on October 9, 2019, the film was set to be released on November 5, 2021, in Japan, after it won several awards including Jury's Special Award at Fantasporto in 2020.

== Plot ==
Timid civil servant, Kenji, is asked to take charge of demolishing a dance hall, where a big shopping mall is planned to be built. No one wants to do the job because the ghost of Mary, a former dancer in the dance hall, interrupts whenever attempts are made to tear the building down. Kenji tries to find an exorcist to lift the curse, and after several attempts, finally meets Yukiko, a high school girl with psychic powers who can see ghosts. Kenji and Yukiko then embark on a difficult journey to find Mary's lover, Johnny, so that the lovers can meet again before Mary's dancing hall is to be demolished.

== Cast ==
- Naoto as Kenji Fujimoto, a civil servant who spends his days in a daze.
- Aina Yamada as Yukiko, a high school girl with psychic vision.
- Nozomi Bando as Mary, a ghost who used to be a dancer.
- Ryo Ishibashi as Aniki, a yakuza member who knows where Jonny has gone.
- Kaito Yoshimura as Jonny, Mary's lover who enjoys gambling and went missing.
- Taro Suwa as Goro Iwata, Kenji's boss, who is developing the site of the former dance hall.
- Ryuji Yamamoto as Kazuki Kito, the local yakuza leader who takes over demolition of the dance hall.

== Production ==
The film was shot in Tokyo, Kitakyushu, Taiwan in February 2018.

== Release ==
The film premiered at Sitges Film Festival on October 9, 2019. Naoto, Ryo Ishibashi, and Sabu attending the world premiere in Spain and greeted the audiences in Spanish and English. The film was set to be released in 2020, but later changed its release date to 2021. On August 6, 2021, it was announced that the film would be released on November 5, 2021.

== Marketing ==
When the film announced its released day of November 5, 2021on August 6, 2021, it was also announced that Naoto would also appear as a special guest in the Abema original drama JAM -the drama- directed by SABU, which would start airing on August 26, as Kenji Fujimoto, the main character of the film.

== Reception ==
=== Critical response ===
On the one hand, film citric Rouven Linnarz described the film as "an entertaining blend of horror and drama exploring themes like spirituality and determinism. ", and pointed out that the most interesting feature of the film, visually and narratively, is "how Sabu and cinematographer Hiroo Yanagida implement the world of the hereafter into the action. " On the other hand, critic Arun Kumar thought the film "falls well short of being an enjoyable blend of multiple genres".

== Awards ==
Award	Category	Ref(s)
Fantasporto(2020)	Jury's Special Award	
ASIAN FILM FESTIVAL Italy(2021)	Most Original Film Award	
