= Makking Gold 1 =

Studio album by Maki Goto
- Released: February 5, 2003
- Genre: J-pop
- Length: 47:46
- Label: Piccolo Town
- Producer: Tsunku

Maki Goto chronology
Makking Gold 1 (2003)	2 Paint It Gold (2004)

Makking Gold 1 (マッキングGOLD①) is the first studio album from Hello! Project solo artist Maki Goto. It was released on February 5, 2003. The first-press version comes in a special package with a photobook.

== Track listing ==
1. "Ai no Bakayarō" (愛のバカやろう)
2. "Te o Nigitte Arukitai" (手を握って歩きたい)
3. "Ai tte Donna XXX?" (愛ってどんな×××？)
4. "Afurechau...Be in Love (A Passionate Mix)" (溢れちゃう…BE IN LOVE)
5. "Date Chūihō" (デート注意報)
6. "Shall We Love? (Goto Version)" (Shall We Love？（後藤Version）)
7. "Yaruki! It's Easy" (やる気！It's Easy)
8. "Moriagaru Shikanai Desho!" (盛り上がるしかないでしょ！)
9. "Hareta Hi no Marine" (晴れた日のマリーン)
10. "Akai Nikkichō (Goto Version)" (赤い日記帳（後藤Version）)
11. "Te o Nigitte Arukitai (Album Version)" (手を握って歩きたい)

== Oricon ranks and sales ==
Daily	Weekly	Sales
4	4	104,999
