= 3rd Station =

- Cover to the standard edition of the album

Studio album by Maki Goto
- Released: February 23, 2005
- Recorded: 2004–2005
- Genre: J-pop
- Length: 45:04
- Label: Piccolo Town
- Producer: Tsunku

Maki Goto chronology
2 Paint It Gold (2004)	3rd Station (2005)	Goto Maki Premium Best 1 (2005)

Box Art Cover

3rd Station (3rd ステーション, 3rd Sutēshon) is the third album by solo singer and former Morning Musume and Petit Moni member Maki Goto.

This album was released on February 23, 2005, and features several songs with different versions from the originals. "Watarasebashi" is a cover version of Chisato Moritaka's song, also covered by fellow Hello! Project member Aya Matsuura, and the "Goto Version" of "Renai Sentai Shitsu Ranger" is Goto's solo version of the original Nochiura Natsumi song. The first press edition comes in a special package with three photo cards, along with an alternate cover.

== Track listing ==
1. "Ekizo na Disco" (エキゾなDISCO)
2. "Sayonara 'Tomodachi ni wa Naritakunai no'" (さよなら｢友達にはなりたくないの｣, Goodbye "I Don't Want to Be Friends")
3. "Yokohama Shinkirō" (横浜蜃気楼, Yokohama Mirage)
4. "Singapore Transit" (シンガポールトランシット)
5. "Rai Rai! 'Shinfū'" (来来!「幸福」)
6. "Watarasebashi (Gotō Version)" (渡良瀬橋(後藤Version))
7. "Positive Genki!" (ポジティブ元気!)
8. "Sayonara no Love Song" (サヨナラのLOVE SONG, Love Song of Goodbye)
9. "Renai Sentai Shitsu Ranger (Gotō Version)" (恋愛戦隊シツレーンジャ (後藤Version), Love Squadron Ranger)
10. "Station" (ステーション)
11. "19 Sai no Hitorigoto" (19歳のひとり言, The Monologue of a 19 Year Old)
