= Gomattō =

Japanese girl group

- (L to R): Matsuura, Goto, and Fujimoto

Background information
- Origin: Tokyo, Japan
- Genres: J-pop, R&B
- Years active: 2002
- Spinoffs: GAM
- Spinoff of: Hello! Project
- Past members: Maki Goto; Aya Matsuura; Miki Fujimoto
- Website: Hello! Project.com

Gomattō (ごまっとう) was a one-shot Hello! Project group, similar to the Hello! Project shuffle units, that released one single called "Shall We Love?".

The formation of Gomattō was announced in October 2002. The idea behind the trio was an R&B style dance-based group featuring Hello! Project soloists Maki Goto, Aya Matsuura and Miki Fujimoto, and was both conceived and named by producer Tsunku. Maki Goto functioned as the leader of the group. Gomattō made their first television appearance in November, and later released their first (and only) single called "Shall We Love?" on November 20, 2002. On December 11, 2002, Goto and Fujimoto performed with Yuko Nakazawa, a fellow member of Hello! Project, as a one-off performance. This incarnation of the group was called "Gonattō" (replacing the "ma" of "Matsuura" with the "na" of "Nakazawa"). All three members graduated from Hello! Project in March 2009 with the rest of the Elder Club.

== Discography ==
=== Singles ===
#	Title	Release date
1	"Shall We Love?"	2002-11-20

=== DVD ===
#	Title	Release date
1	"Shall We Love?" (Single V)	2002-12-04
