= Mandy Sekiguchi =

Japanese dancer, rapper, and actor (born 1991)

- 関口 メンディー
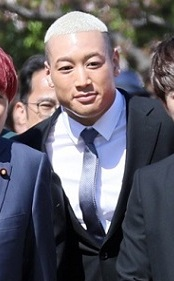
- Sekiguchi in 2019
- Born: 25 January 1991 (age 35); New Jersey, U.S
- Other names: Mandy; Monsta Twiggz
- Citizenship: Japanese
- Education: Nippon Sport Science University
- Occupations: Rapper; dancer
- Years active: 2011–present
- Agent: Independent
- Notable credits: Generations from Exile Tribe; Exile; Exile Tribe; Jr.Exile
- Spouse: Unknown (m. 2025)
- Website: LDH.co.jp

Mandy Sekiguchi (関口 メンディー; Sekiguchi Mendi, born January 25, 1991) is an American-born Japanese actor, dancer, rapper and a former member of J-Pop groups Generations from Exile Tribe, Exile and Honest Boyz.

== Early life ==
Mandy Sekiguchi was born on January 25, 1991, in New Jersey to a Japanese mother and a Nigerian American father of Igbo descent. He grew up in Shinagawa, Tokyo, and was raised monolingual in Japanese. He started to study English later on in his career. Sekiguchi played baseball at the age of 6 and practiced it until his third year in high school.

== Career ==
In April 2011, Mandy participated in the Exile Professional Gym (Expg) audition produced by Hiro, and he was selected as a member of Generations from Exile Tribe.

In April 2012, he became an official member of Generations and debuted in November of the same year.

Mandy advanced into acting for the first time in April 2014, when he was selected as a cast member of Fuji TV's late night program Wow. On April 27, 2014, Mandy passed the Exile Performer Battle Audition Final in Nippon Budoukan and became a member of Exile. In May of the same year, he made his stage debut in the stage play Dance Earth Project "Changes" while also joining the coed-group Dance Earth Party for one year.

On January 26, 2015, members of Sekiguchi Mandy and Generations from Exile Tribe were appointed as "Hong Kong Tourism Goodwill Ambassadors" by the Hong Kong Tourism Board. On April 15, 2016, he became a member of the hip-hop unit Honest Boyz. He took on the position of MC in the group, calling himself simply Mandy (stylized as Mandy). This marked the first time he would use his vocals in a group.

In August 2017, Mandy produced the 24karats×KANGOL collaboration collection of designer hats. 24karats is a fashion brand developed by LDH while Kangol was founded in 1938 as a British traditional beret brand which established itself as a symbol of the art scene. Additionally, he made his acting debut in LDH's movie universe HiGH & Low in the same year.

On June 5, 2018, he threw the first pitch at the opening ceremony of the Giants vs Rakuten baseball game, held at Tokyo Dome. His appearance garnered great public attention since the speed of his pitch reached 133 km/h, the fastest thrown by an entertainer at that time. His record was broken by Golden Bomber's Kenji Darvish later on (135 km/h) and both developed a comedic rivalry. On August 31, Sanrio announced they would produce a new character, Hello Mandy, based on Mandy Sekiguchi. The character is designed with an "M" lavaliere on a necklace and one of Mandy's most familiar hairstyles.

In January 2019, Mandy was chosen as a representative for the promotion of the American movie Aquaman in Japan. On February 14, he attended the Prince OF Legend Premium Live Show, a fan-meeting with the whole Prince of Legend cast, at Yokohama Arena. On March 18, Mandy was invited to throw another first pitch at the opening ceremony of the Giants vs Mariners baseball game at Tokyo Dome. However, he wasn't able to exceed his previous record. On June 4, it was announced that Hello Mandy won the No. 1 prize in the collaboration category of the Sanrio Character Award, an award based on an annual popularity voting. On July 17, Generations from Exile Tribe released the single "Brand New Story". It included "Control Myself" as a B-side track, being the group's first original English song and also the first one to feature Mandy as a rapper. On September 9, it was announced that Mandy would be part of the cast for the live-action series of the manga Motokare Mania (モトカレマニア; Ex-Boyfriend Mania). This would be the first time that he will appear in a prime time drama.

On April 30 2024, Sekiguchi announced that he would be graduate from the group leave LDH Japan on June 25 2024. He later revealed he wanted to become someone who can be active not only in Japan, but all over the world.

== Personal life ==
On January 25, 2025, Sekiguchi announced his marriage through a post on his official social media account.

== Participating groups ==
| Name | Period of time |
|---|---|
| Generations from Exile Tribe | April 2011 – |
| Exile | April 2014 – |
| ®ag Pound | 2015 – |
| Honest Boyz | April 2016 – |

== Filmography ==
=== TV programmes ===
| Year | Title | Notes | Ref. |
|---|---|---|---|
| 2013-2015 | Kyuukyoku no Otoko wa Dareda? Saikyou Supoutsu Danshi Choujou Kessen | Appeared in the second to fifth and seventh Annual Meeting Victory | |
| 2014 | Wow | | |
| 2014 | Viking | | |
| 2016 | Kyuukyoku no Otoko wa Dareda? Saikyou Supoutsu Danshi moto Ni~Tsu Choujou Kessen! | New Year's special | |

=== Stage ===
| Year | Title | Role | Ref. |
|---|---|---|---|
| 2014 | Dance Earth: Changes | Kuruma | |

=== TV dramas ===
| Year | Title | Role | Notes | Ref. |
|---|---|---|---|---|
| 2016 | Night Hero Naoto | himself | Episode 5; ending dance | |
| 2018 | Prince of Legend | Gabriel Sasazuka | | |
| 2018 | Happy-Go-Lucky! | Manns | | |
| 2019 | Secret x Warrior Phantomirage | Phandy | | |
| 2019 | Ex-Boyfriend Mania (モトカレマニア) | Tadafumi Shirai | | |
| 2023 | Ya Boy Kongming! | Keiji Maezono | | |
| 2025 | Omusubi | Ryuji Sawada | Asadora | |
| 2026 | Shadows of the Ten Ninja | Tsuge Kiyohiro | | |

=== Movies ===
| Year | Title | Role | Ref. |
|---|---|---|---|
| 2017 | High & Low The movie 2 End Of Sky | Pho | |
| 2017 | High & Low The movie 3 Final Mission | Pho | |
| 2019 | Prince of Legend | Gabriel Sasazuka | |
| 2022 | Kappei | Kazuya | |
| 2023 | Sana | Himself | |
| 2025 | Babanba Banban Vampire | Ken "Franken" Shinozuka | |
| 2025 | Ya Boy Kongming! The Movie | Keiji Maezono | |
| 2025 | Kowloon Generic Romance | Promotional staff | |

=== Live performances ===
| Year | Title | Ref. |
|---|---|---|
| 2018 | 27th Tokyo Girls Collection 2018 Autumn / Winter | |
| 2019 | Prince OF Legend Premium Live Show | |
| 2019 | 28th Tokyo Girls Collection 2019 Spring / Summer | |

=== Game ===
| Year | Title | Network | Role | Ref. |
|---|---|---|---|---|
| 2019 | Prince Of Legend Love Royale | Gabriel Sasazuka | Released on March 25; Available on iOS / Android | |

=== Advertisements ===
| Year | Title | Ref. |
|---|---|---|
| 2014 | Aoyama Prestige Technology "Soul Man" | |
| 2015 | Daiichi Kosho Company Live Dam Stadium | |
| 2015 | Bandai Namco Entertainment Taiko no Tatsujin | |
| 2016 | SoftBank "Sponavi Live" | |
| 2018 | Nissin "Cup Noodle" | |
| 2019 | NTT Docomo × Rag Pound | |
| 2019 | Fendi "BaguetteFriendsForever" | |

=== Music videos ===
| Year | Group | Title | Ref. |
|---|---|---|---|
| 2011 | Sandaime J Soul Brothers | Fighters | |
| 2018 | CrazyBoy | Private Party | |
| 2018 | Red Diamond Dogs | Red Soul Blue Dragon | |
| 2019 | Okamoto's | Dancing Boy | |

== Work ==
=== Character ===
- "Hello Mandy"(December, 2018; Sanrio)
