= How to Use Sexy =

- Front cover of regular edition CD.

Studio album by Maki Goto
- Released: September 19, 2007
- Recorded: 2006–2007
- Genre: Pop
- Label: Piccolo Town
- Producer: Tsunku

Maki Goto chronology
Goto Maki Premium Best 1 (2005)	How to Use Sexy (2007)	Sweet Black (2010)

Limited edition

How to Use Sexy is the fourth studio album by Japanese pop singer Maki Goto. The album was released on September 19, 2007 via Piccolo Town in two editions: a regular edition with catalog number PKCP-5096 and a limited edition with catalog number PKCP-5094~5 which came with a DVD.

== Track listing ==
=== CD ===
1. "How to Use Loneliness"
2. "Give Me Love"
3. "Some Boys! Touch"
4. "City Wind"
5. "Nee Samishikute" (ねえ 寂しくて)
6. "Glass no Pumps"
7. "Day Break"
8. "Wow Suteki!" (WOW 素敵！)
9. "Secret"
10. "Life"

=== DVD ===
1. "Glass no Pumps (Mirror Ver.)"
2. "Some Boys! Touch (Sexy Ver.)"
3. "Secret (Bathroom Ver.)"
4. "Making Of"

== Oricon ranks and sales ==
Chart (2007)	Peak position
Daily Chart	6
Weekly Chart	18

Total sales: 14,996
