= Def.Diva =

Japanese idol group

- 2006

Background information
- Origin: Tokyo, Japan
- Genre: Pop
- Years active: 2005–2007
- Label: Zetima
- Past members: Aya Matsuura; Maki Goto; Natsumi Abe; Rika Ishikawa
- Website: Hello! Project Official Website

Def.Diva (often stylized as DEF.DIVA) was a "special group" formed in 2005 from the Hello! Project idol umbrella, and consisted of Aya Matsuura, Maki Goto, Natsumi Abe and Rika Ishikawa. The band's name is an abbreviation of the phrase "Definite Diva".

Three of the members of Def.Diva (Goto, Abe, Ishikawa) were previous Morning Musume members, while Matsuura is a soloist. Goto, Matsuura and Abe also comprised a previous three-member special group, Nochiura Natsumi. The four were joined in September 2005 to form Def.Diva.

After Maki Goto's graduation from Hello! Project in October 2007, the group made no more releases. All of the three remaining members graduated with the rest of the Elder Club on March 31, 2009, leaving the group empty and on indefinite hiatus.

== Discography ==
=== Singles ===
#	Title	Release date
1	"Suki Sugite Baka Mitai" (好きすぎて バカみたい)	2005-10-19
2	"Let's Go Rakuten Eagles" (Let's Go 楽天イーグルス)	2006-03-25

== Members ==
- Aya Matsuura (Soloist; graduated from Hello! Project in March 2009)
- Maki Goto (Soloist, former member of Morning Musume; graduated from Hello! Project in October 2007)
- Natsumi Abe (Soloist, former member of Morning Musume; graduated from Hello! Project in March 2009)
- Rika Ishikawa (Former member of Morning Musume and former leader of v-u-den; graduated from Hello! Project in March 2009)
