= Yuki Koyanagi =

Yuki Koyanagi 小柳ゆき
- Also known as: 小柳 ゆき (Koyanagi Yuki)
- Born: 小柳由紀 (Koyanagi Yuki); January 26, 1982 (age 44)
- Origin: Saitama City, Saitama, Japan
- Genres: J-pop
- Occupation: Singer
- Years active: 1998–present
- Labels: Warner Music, Nayutawave
- Website: yuki-koyanagi.jp

Yuki Koyanagi (小柳 ゆき, Koyanagi Yuki; born January 26, 1982) is a Japanese pop singer. She released her first single, "Anata no kisu o kazoemashô – You Were Mine" on September 15, 1999. This song was a huge hit in Japan and made the 17-year-old a sensation overnight. Her second album, Expansion, sold over 1.3 million copies, and it features her biggest chart hit, "Aijo". She has done several albums (in English) of cover songs, including disco and movie standards.

After a break of several years, her album Sunrise was released in March 2007.

== Life and career ==
Koyanagi was born in Saitama City, Japan. She is known for singing the English version of "Cross Colors", the ending theme of Dynasty Warriors 4. Before that, she worked with Nathan Morris and Shawn Stockman of Boyz II Men who wrote most of the songs on and produced her album Intimacy. She performed the songs in English, without understanding what she was singing.

Yuki sang the American and Japanese National Anthems during the 2006 World Baseball Classic in Tokyo. She also sang the Japanese National Anthem for an international soccer match between Japan and Trinidad & Tobago in 2006.

== Discography ==
=== Albums ===
==== Studio albums ====
Title	Album details	Peak chart positions	Sales (JPN)	Certifications
Title	Album details	JPN Oricon	Sales (JPN)	Certifications
Freedom	Released: 25 November 1999; Label: Warner Japan; Formats: CD, digital download, streaming	6	523,000	RIAJ: Platinum
Expansion	Released: 23 August 2000; Label: Warner Japan; Formats: CD, digital download, streaming	1	1,293,000	RIAJ: Million
My All...	Released: 30 May 2001; Label: Warner Japan; Formats: CD, digital download, streaming	4	264,000	RIAJ: 3× Platinum
Buddy	Released: 21 August 2002; Label: Warner Japan; Formats: CD, digital download, streaming	6	76,000	
Type	Released: 25 September 2003; Label: Warner Japan; Formats: CD, digital download, streaming	39	18,000	
I'll Be Travelin' Home	Released: 24 November 2004; Label: Warner Japan; Formats: CD, digital download, streaming	61	7,000	
Sunrise	Released: 21 March 2007; Label: Warner Japan; Formats: CD, digital download, streaming	70	6,000	

==== Compilation albums ====
Title	Album details	Peak chart positions	Certifications
Title	Album details	JPN Oricon	Certifications
Koyanagi the Ballads 1999-2001	Released: 28 November 2001; Label: Warner Japan; Formats: CD, digital download, streaming	13	RIAJ: Gold
My All: Yuki Koyanagi Singles 1999-2003	Released: 28 January 2004; Label: Warner Japan; Formats: CD, digital download, streaming	14	
The Best Now & Then: 10th Anniversary	Released: 24 February 2010; Label: Nayutawave; Formats: CD, digital download, streaming	54	
The Best of Yuki Koyanagi Eternity: 15th Anniversary	Released: 25 September 2013; Label: Nayutawave; Formats: CD, digital download, streaming	145	
The Best of Yuki Koyanagi 2015 Here for You: Universal Selection	Released: 25 February 2015; Label: Nayutawave; Formats: CD, digital download, streaming	171	

==== Cover albums ====
Title	Album details	Peak chart positions	Sales (JPN)	Certifications
Title	Album details	JPN Oricon	Sales (JPN)	Certifications
Koyanagi the Covers Product 1	Released: 24 May 2000; Label: Warner Japan; Formats: CD, digital download, streaming	1	750,000	RIAJ: 3× Platinum
Koyanagi the Disco	Released: 26 March 2003; Label: Warner Japan; Formats: CD, digital download, streaming	58	16,000	
Koyanagi the Covers Product 2	Released: 25 September 2003; Label: Warner Japan; Formats: CD, digital download, streaming	29	29,000	

- FREEDOM (1999/11/25)
- Koyanagi the Covers PRODUCT 1 (2000/5/24)
- EXPANSION (2000/8/23)
- Koyanagi the Live in Japan 2000 (2001/2/28)- 2 discs
- my all... (2001/5/30)
- KOYANAGI the BALLADS 1999～2001 (2001/11/28)
- intimacy (2002/4/24)
- buddy (2002/8/21)
- KOYANAGI THE LIVE IN JAPAN 2001－2002 (2002/11/27)- 4 discs
- KOYANAGI the DISCO (2003/3/26)
- KOYANAGI the COVERS PRODUCT 2 (2003/9/25)
- Type (2003/9/25)
- Acoustic Concert at Orchard Hall (2003/11/12)- 2 discs
- MY ALL＜YUKI KOYANAGI SINGLES 1999－2003＞ (2004/1/28)- CD+DVD
- I'll Be Travelin' Home (2004/11/24)
- Sunrise (2007/3/21)
- The Best Now&Then ～10th Anniversary～ (2010/2/24)
- Prelude (2019/9/4)

=== Singles ===
- あなたのキスを数えましょう ～You were mine～ (1999/9/15)- JAP #7
- fairyland (trans@k feat. 小柳ゆき) (1999/10/27)
- あなたのキスを数えましょう Opus II (with trans@k) (Anata no Kisu o Kazoemashou) (2000/1/26)
- 愛情 (Aijou) (2000/4/12)- JAP #3
- be alive (2000/7/26)
- Koyanagi the Christmas (2000/11/15)
- DEEP DEEP (2001/4/25)
- beautiful world (2001/4/25)
- my all... (2001/6/13)
- remain～心の鍵～ (remain～Kokoro no Kagi) (2001/11/21)
- HIT ON (2002/2/14)
- Endless (2002/7/10)
- Lovin' you (2002/10/17)
- ON THE RADIO (2003/3/5)
- 恋のフーガ／会いたい (Koi no Fuga / Aitai) (2003/8/6）- JAP #36
- Love knot～愛の絆～ (Love Knot – Ai no Kizuna) (2004/1/28)
- Crystal Days (2004/11/24)
- 最後に記憶を消して (Saigo ni Kiwoku wo Keshite) (2005/4/27)
- Fair Wind (2006/5/10)
- 誓い (Chikai) (2006/10/11)
- we can go anywhere (2008/10/15) [1'669 copies sold – 2 weeks]
- MacArthur Park (Donna Summer) / All at Once (2012.07.25)

=== Video/DVDs ===
- KOYANAGI THE MOVIES PRODUCT 1 (2000/09/27)
- KOYANAGI THE BUDOKAN KOYANAGI THE LIVE IN JAPAN 2000 (2001/07/11)
- KOYANAGI THE MOVIES PRODUCT 2 (2001/09/05)
