= Suki Sugite Baka Mitai =

Single by Def.Diva
- Released: October 19, 2005 (JP)
- Recorded: 2005
- Genre: J-pop
- Label: zetima
- Producer: Tsunku

Def.Diva singles chronology
"Suki Sugite Baka Mitai" (2005)	"Let's Go Rakuten Eagles" (2006)

"Suki Sugite Baka Mitai" (好きすぎて バカみたい) is the first single released by Japanese pop group, Def.Diva. It was released on October 19, 2005. This single hit the #1 of Oricon charts, and around 46,822 copies.

== Track listing ==
1. Suki Sugite Baka Mitai 4:56
2. Suki Sugite Baka Mitai (Crazy J-G Jazz Remix) 4:49
3. Suki Sugite Baka Mitai (Joou Remix) 4:08
4. Suki Sugite Baka Mitai (Instrumental) 4:55

== Personnel ==
- Lyricist: Tsunku
- Arranger: Shoichiro Hirata
- Remixers: Nao Tanaka, Akira
- Catalog No.: EPCE-5381
