= Ai Kotoba (Voice) =

Ai Kotoba (Voice) 愛言葉 (Voice)

Studio album by Maki Goto
- Released: November 2, 2011
- Genres: J-pop; pop rock; electropop
- Length: 56:20 (CD 1)
- Label: Avex Trax

Maki Goto chronology
Love (EP) (2011)	Ai Kotoba (Voice) 愛言葉 (Voice) (2011)

Ai Kotoba (Voice) (Japanese: 愛言葉 (Voice), Love Language) is the fifth album (the first under Avex Trax) released by Maki Goto on November 2, 2011. It comes in three editions:

- CD-Only (AVCD-38364)
- CD+DVD (AVCD-38363)
- 2CD+2DVD (AVCD-38365-6); includes: DVD featuring music videos, 15 postcards featuring Maki Goto's shot in Shinjuku by Nicola Formichetti, a bonus CD "Collabo-Works Disc", a second DVD "Making Movie Disc")

== Track listing ==
CD 1
No.	Title	Length
1.	"What is Love"	3:50
2.	"Get Your Way"	4:13
3.	"You"	4:41
4.	"Tsukikage (月影; Moon Shadow)"	5:16
5.	"Ai Kotoba (愛言葉; Words of Love)"	4:31
6.	"Eyes"	3:38
7.	"Paradise"	3:17
8.	"Scandalous"	3:37
9.	"Houseki (宝石; Jewel)"	4:19
10.	""Nee..." (｢ねぇ、、、｣; Hey...)"	4:11
11.	"Hanauta (華詩; Flower Poem)"	5:39
12.	"Believe"	4:50
13.	"Ashiato (足跡; Footprints)"	4:12

CD 2 (Collabo-Works Disc)
No.	Title	Writer(s)	Length
1.	"Queen Bee (with Bigga Raiji) as Sweet Black feat. Maki Gotō"	Bigga Raiji, Aili	4:54
2.	"Lady-Rise as Sweet Black feat. Maki Gotō"	Maki Gotō, Thomas Gustafsson, Hugo Lira, Negin, Ian-Paolo Lira, Nick, Halkes, Nosheen	2:59
3.	"Candy as Sweet Black feat. Maki Gotō"	Maki Gotō, Niv V, Davidovich, Danielle McKee	3:42
4.	"Tear Drops (with KG) as Sweet Black feat. Maki Gotō"	Kaori Moriwaka, Shikata, Aili	4:01
5.	"Mine (with KEN THE 390) as Sweet Black feat. Maki Gotō"	KEN THE 390, Maki Gotō, U-Key zone	4:01
6.	"Fly Away as Sweet Black feat. Maki Gotō"	Maki Gotō, Hiro	4:45
7.	"Plastic Lover as Sweet Black feat. Maki Gotō"	Leonn, Tetsuya Tamura	5:22
8.	"With... as Sweet Black feat. Maki Gotō"	Maki Gotō, Aili, Akira	4:58
9.	"Golden LUV as ravex feat. Maki Gotō"
10.	"Crazy in Love as Dj Mayumi feat. Maki Goto with Falco & Shino"
11.	"Fly Away (House Nation Remix) as Sweet Black feat. Maki Gotō"
12.	"Plastic Lover (Club Mix) as Sweet Black feat. Maki Gotō"

DVD 1
No.	Title	Length
1.	"Fly away"
2.	"Lady-Rise"
3.	"With..."
4.	"Tear Drops"
5.	"Queen Bee"
6.	"Eyes"
7.	"Houseki (宝石; Jewel)"
8.	"Ashiato (足跡; Footprints)"
9.	""Nee..." (｢ねぇ、、、｣; Hey...)"
10.	"You"

DVD 2 (Making Movie Disc)
No.	Title	Length
1.	"Maki Goto @ Kabukicho, directed by Nicola Formichetti (Making Of)"
2.	"Aya no Kōji Shō <Ai Ai Kasa> Goto Maki (Backstage Video)"
3.	"You (Making Of)"

== Charts ==
Chart	Peak Position
Oricon Daily Albums Chart	4
Oricon Weekly Albums Chart	8

== Release history ==
Country	Date	Format	Label
Japan	November 2, 2011	CD, CD+DVD, 2CD+2DVD	Avex Trax
Hong Kong	November 25, 2011	CD+DVD	Avex Asia
