= Some Boys! Touch =

2006 single by Maki Goto

Single by Maki Goto

from the album How to Use Sexy
- Language: Japanese
- B-side: "All of Us"
- Released: October 11, 2006
- Genre: J-pop
- Length: 4:33
- Label: Piccolo Town
- Songwriter: Tsunku
- Producer: Tsunku

Alternative cover
- Limited edition cover

"Some Boys! Touch" is Maki Goto's 16th single. It was released on October 11, 2006 in both limited (PKCP-5070~1) and regular (PKCP-5072) editions. The Single V DVD did come out two weeks later on October 25, 2006 with the catalog number PKBP-5055. The B-side, "All of Us", is used as the first ending theme song to the anime Ginga Tetsudou Monogatari ~Eien e no Bunkiten~.

Some Boys! Touch is also the third track of Goto's fourth album, How to Use Sexy.

== Credits ==
- SOME BOYS! TOUCH
  - Lyrics: Tsunku
  - Composer: Tsunku
  - Arrangement: Tanaka Nao
- ALL OF US
  - Lyrics: Tsunku
  - Composer: Tsunku
  - Arrangement: Suzuki Shunsuke

== CD track listing ==
1. SOME BOYS! TOUCH
2. ALL OF US
3. SOME BOYS! TOUCH (Instrumental)

== DVD track listing ==
1. SOME BOYS! TOUCH
2. SOME BOYS! TOUCH (Dance Shot)
3. メイキング映像 (Making of)

== TV performances ==
- 2006-10-06 Music Fighter
- 2006-10-08 Hello! Morning
- 2006-10-14 POP JAM
- 2006-10-21 Music Fair 21

== Concert performances ==
- Goto Maki Live Tour 2006 ~G Emotion~
- Hello! Project 2007 Winter ~Shuuketsu! 10th Anniversary~
- Hello! Project Tour Winter 2007 ~Elder Club THE CELEBRATION~

== Oricon Rank and Sales ==
Mon	Tue	Wed	Thu	Fri	Sat	Sun	Week Rank	Sales
-	3	4	6	6	6	7	5	20,665
10	19	19	22	20	21	21	21	5,102
21	40	47	47	-	49	47	51	2,352
-	-	-	-	-	-	-	116	886
-	-	-	-	-	-	-	186	454

Total sales: 29,459*
