= Glass no Pumps =

Single Cover

Single V Cover

"Glass no Pumps" (ガラスのパンプス, Garasu no panpusu) is the 15th single by Japanese singer Maki Goto. It was released on 7 June 2006 with the catalog number PKCP-5066. The Single "V" was released two weeks later on 21 June 2006 with the catalog number PKBP-5049.

"Glass no Pumps" is also the sixth track of Goto's fourth album, How to Use Sexy.

== Credits ==
- Glass no Pumps
  - Lyrics: Tsunku
  - Composer: Tsunku
  - Arrangement: Shoichiro Hirata
- Love Kan Coffee
  - Lyrics: Tsunku
  - Composer: Tsunku
  - Arrangement: Akira

== CD track listing ==
1. ガラスのパンプス (Glass no Pumps)
2. LOVE缶コーヒー (Love Kan Coffee)
3. ガラスのパンプス(Instrumental) (Glass no Pumps (Instrumental))

== DVD track listing ==
1. ガラスのパンプス (Glass no Pumps)
2. ガラスのパンプス (Dance Shot Version)
3. メイキング映像 (Making of)
