= Te o Nigitte Arukitai =

Single by Maki Goto
- Released: May 9, 2002 (JP)
- Recorded: 2002
- Genre: J-pop
- Label: Zetima
- Songwriter(s): Tsunku
- Producer(s): Tsunku

Maki Goto singles chronology
| "Afurechau...Be in Love" (2001) | "Te o Nigitte Arukitai" (2002) | "Yaruki! It's Easy" (2002) |

"Te o Nigitte Arukitai" (手を握って歩きたい, I Want to Walk Holding Hands) is Maki Goto's third single. It was released on May 9, 2002 with the catalog number EPCE-5152.

== Track listing ==
All tracks are written and composed by Tsunku.

1. "Te o Nigitte Arukitai" (手を握って歩きたい, I Want to Walk Holding Hands)
  - Arrangement: Takao Konishi
2. "Tokutōseki" (特等席)
  - Arrangement: Mikio Sakai
3. "Te o Nigitte Arukitai" (Instrumental)

== Performances ==
=== Concert ===
- Morning Musume Concert Tour 2002 Haru "Love Is Alive!"
- Morning Musume Love Is Alive! 2002 Natsu
- Hello! Project 2003 Winter ~Tanoshin Jattemasu!~
- Goto Maki First Concert Tour 2003 Haru ~Go! Makking Gold~
- Hello! Project 2003 Natsu ~Yossha! Bikkuri Summer!!~ (with Hello! Project Kids)
- Goto Maki Concert Tour 2003 Aki Sexy! Makking Gold
- Goto Maki Concert Tour 2004 Haru ~Makkin-iro ni Nucchae!~ (as part of a medley)
- Hello! Project 2004 Summer ~Natsu no Doon!~
- Goto Maki Concert Tour 2004 Aki Aa Maki no Shirabe (with Atsuko Inaba)
- Hello! Project 2005 Winter All-Stars Dairanbu ~A Happy New Power! Iida Kaori Sotsugyo Special~ (by Hello! Project)
  - Hello! Project Akagumi (by Hello! Project Akagumi)
  - Hello! Project Shirogumi (by Hello! Project Shirogumi)
- Nochiura Natsumi Concert Tour 2005 Haru "Triangle Energy" (by Natsumi Nochiura)
- Hello Pro Party! 2006 ~Goto Maki Captain Kōen~
- Hello! Project 2007 Summer 10th Anniversary Dai Kanshasai ~Hello! Project Natsu Matsuri!~ (by Momoko Tsugunaga, Miyabi Natsuyaki, Maimi Yajima, Saki Nakajima & Hello Pro Egg)

=== Television ===
- Hello Pro Hour #1 (by Megumi Murakami)
