= List of School Rumble albums =

This is a list of albums for the anime series School Rumble, based on the manga of the same name. Singles have been released for the opening and ending theme songs for both seasons, in addition to two soundtracks. There are also three vocal collections, three radio dramas, and eight character song albums.

== Opening and ending themes ==
=== Scramble ===
"Scramble"

Single by Yui Horie with UNSCANDAL
- Released: October 27, 2004
- Genre: Anime soundtrack
- Label: King Records

Scramble (スクランブル) is the first opening theme song for School Rumble. There are two versions, a Limited Edition (pictured) and a Regular Edition. The Limited Edition version came with a DVD containing promotional videos.

==== Track listing ====
1. Scramble (スクランブル)
2. Go!Go!Golden Days
3. Scramble (off vocal) [スクランブル (off vocal version)]
4. Go!Go!Golden Days (off vocal)

=== Onna no ko Otoko no ko ===
"Onnanoko Otokonoko"

Single by Yuko Ogura
- Released: November 26, 2004
- Genre: Anime soundtrack
- Label: King Records
- Producer: Yasuharu Konishi

Onnanoko Otokonoko (オンナのコ オトコのコ) is the first ending theme song for School Rumble. There are two versions, a Limited Edition (pictured) and a Regular Edition. The Limited Edition version came with a DVD containing promotional videos.

==== Track listing ====
1. Onnanoko Otokonoko (オンナのコ オトコのコ)
2. 恋の呪文はパパピプパ
3. Onnanoko Otokonoko [オンナのコ オトコのコ (off vocal)]
4. 恋の呪文はパパピプパ (off vocal)

=== Sentimental Generation ===
"Sentimental Generation"

Single by Ami Tokito
- Released: April 19, 2006
- Genre: Anime soundtrack
- Label: Pioneer

Sentimental Generation (せんちめんたる じぇねれ~しょん) is the first opening theme song for School Rumble - Second Term, the second season of School Rumble. The first ending theme for Second Term, Kono Namida Ga Arukara Tsugi No Ippo To Naru (この涙があるから次の一歩となる), is also on this single. There are two versions, a Limited Edition, and a Regular Edition. The Limited Edition version came with a DVD containing a music video for "Sentimental Generation".

==== Track listing ====
1. Sentimental Generation (せんちめんたる じぇねれ~しょん)
2. Kono Namida Ga Arukara Tsugi No Ippo To Naru (この涙があるから次の一歩となる)
3. Sentimental Generation (karaoke) [せんちめんたる じぇねれ~しょん(カラオケ)]
4. Kono Namida Ga Arukara Tsugi No Ippo To Naru (karaoke) [この涙があるから次の一歩となる (カラオケ)]

=== Futari wa Wasurechau ===
"Futari wa Wasurechau"

Single by Ami Koshimizu and Mamiko Noto
- Released: August 2, 2006
- Genre: Anime soundtrack
- Label: Pioneer LDC

Futari wa Wasurechau (二人は忘れちゃう) is the second ending theme song for School Rumble - Second Term, the second season of School Rumble, sung by the voice actors for Tenma Tsukamoto and Yakumo Tsukamoto, Ami Koshimizu and Mamiko Noto, respectively.

==== Track listings ====
1. Futari wa Wasurechau (二人は忘れちゃう)
2. 大好きと 抱きしめて 飛ぶ ソング
3. Futari wa Wasurechau with Tenma version (二人は忘れちゃう with 天満 ver.)
4. Futari wa Wasurechau with Yakumo version (二人は忘れちゃう with 八雲 ver.)
5. Futari wa Wasurechau (original karaoke) [二人は忘れちゃう(オリジナルカラオケ)]
6. 大好きと 抱きしめて 飛ぶ ソング with 天満 ver.
7. 大好きと 抱きしめて 飛ぶ ソング with 八雲 ver.
8. 大好きと 抱きしめて 飛ぶ ソング(オリジナルカラオケ)

== Soundtracks ==
=== School Rumble - Sound School ===
School Rumble - Sound School

Studio album by Various
- Released: January 26, 2005
- Genre: Anime soundtrack
- Length: 57:29
- Label: King Records

School Rumble - Sound School (スクールランブル SOUND SCHOOL) is the first anime soundtrack for the TV series School Rumble, featuring compositions by Toshiyuki Omori. The first pressings of Sound School included a bonus CD-ROM that contained illustrations by School Rumble creator Jin Kobayashi.

==== Track listing ====
	Track name	Artist	Length
1.	Scramble (TV Size)	Yui Horie with UNSCANDAL	1:37
2.	Every Dog Has His Day	Toshiyuki Omori	7:49
3.	Boys Will Be Boys	Omori	5:23
4.	School Rumble 4 Ever	Ami Koshimizu, Yui Horie, Hitomi Nabatame, Kaori Shimizu	3:51
5.	All's Fair in Love and War	Omori	4:59
6.	The Sooner, the Better	Omori	3:27
7.	It Takes Two to Tango	Omori	5:38
8.	Love Is Blind	Omori	4:29
9.	Kimi e ~ Kaze ni Nosete	Hiroki Takahashi	3:39
10.	Rome Was Not Built in One Day	Omori	4:50
11.	Sanbiki ga Kill	Omori	3:15
12.	Onna no Ko Otoko no Ko (TV Size)	Yuko Ogura	1:26
13.	School Rumble 4 Ever (off vocal)	Omori	3:51
14.	Kimi e ~ Kaze ni Nosete (off vocal)	Omori	3:36

=== School Rumble Nigakki Original Soundtrack - Yagami Ongakusai ===
School Rumble Nigakki Original Soundtrack - Yagami Ongakusai

Studio album by Various
- Released: September 26, 2006
- Genre: Anime soundtrack
- Length: 59:11
- Label: Pioneer LDC

School Rumble Nigakki Original Soundtrack - Yagami Ongakusai (スクールランブル二学期サウンドトラック 「矢神音楽祭」) is the anime soundtrack for School Rumble - Second Term, the second season of School Rumble. It also features compositions by Toshiyuki Omori.

==== Track listing ====
	Track name	Artist	Length
1.	Sentimental Generation (TV Size)	Ami Tokito	1:32
2.	New SANBIKI Reloaded	Toshiyuki Omori	3:21
3.	MAI	Toshiyuki Omori	2:11
4.	The Survival	Toshiyuki Omori	2:51
5.	The Kanda River	Toshiyuki Omori	1:22
6.	The Lord of the TENGU	Toshiyuki Omori	2:28
7.	Sleeping Beast	Toshiyuki Omori	2:11
8.	Prince VS Witch	Toshiyuki Omori	2:31
9.	Are you Iron Chef?	Toshiyuki Omori	1:36
10.	Susperian Suspense	Toshiyuki Omori	2:17
11.	Lonely Sentimental (Opening Arr)	Tsunku	1:58
12.	Nice, Satsuki, Nice	Toshiyuki Omori	2:13
13.	Happiness after Blue	Toshiyuki Omori	2:33
14.	La La Litin Da La La	Toshiyuki Omori	2:43
15.	The Ghost Story	Toshiyuki Omori	2:04
16.	Is this love or not?	Toshiyuki Omori	2:02
17.	Christmas & Trance (Opening Arr)	Takashi Iwato and Toshiyuki Omori	3:33
18.	Tenma & Yakumo (Ending Arr)	IPPEI	3:55
19.	Battle on the cruise	Shin-go and Takashi Iwato	1:40
20.	Discharge	Shigehiko Saito	2:40
21.	Kono Namida Ga Arukara Tsugi No Ippo To Naru (TV Size)	Ami Tokito	1:33
22.	Futari Ha Wasurechau (TV Size)	Ami Koshimizu and Mamiko Noto	1:34
23.	Girls Can Rock	Lia	3:39
24.	Feel Like A Girl	Lia	4:32

== Vocal CDs ==
=== School Rumble Super Twin Album ~School Tea Cha!~ ===
School Rumble Super Twin Album ~School Tea Cha!~

Studio album by Various
- Released: December 28, 2005
- Genre: Drama CD/Anime soundtrack
- Label: King Records

School Rumble Super Twin Album ~School Tea Cha! (スクールランブル Super Twin Album ~School Tea Cha!) is a two disc drama CD and soundtrack album.

==== Track listing ====
Disc 1

1. スクランブル (Tvサイズ)
2. ドラマ第1話『茶道部で合宿! 2』
3. ドラマ第2話『茶道部で懺悔!』
4. 銀河沿線 '05
5. ドラマ第3話『ヒルズでムカッ! 懺悔室で、もっとムカッ!』
6. ドラマ第4話『茶道部でバンジー』
7. オンナのコ♡オトコのコ (Tvサイズ)

Disc 2

1. ～第一幕～ イントロダクション
2. ～第一幕～ 俺様の名は播磨拳児
3. ～第一幕～ 芝居1
4. ～第一幕～ 芝居2
5. ～第一幕～ 深呼吸して
6. ～第一幕～ アイ・ロベ・ヨウ
7. ～第一幕～ 芝居3
8. ～第一幕～ 芝居4
9. ～第一幕～ フレンチポップス
10. ～第一幕～ 芝居5
11. ～第一幕～ 普通ブギ
12. ～第一幕～ 芝居6
13. ～第一幕～ 何より悔しいコト
14. ～第一幕～ 芝居7
15. ～第一幕～ ボスフォラス
16. ～第二幕～ 芝居8
17. ～第二幕～ スポ根?ミスコン?
18. ～第二幕～ 芝居9
19. ～第二幕～ 芝居10
20. ～第二幕～ He Is Not A Boy
21. ～第二幕～ 芝居11
22. ～第二幕～ マスク
23. ～第二幕～ 芝居12
24. ～第二幕～ 肉じゃがパパ
25. ～第二幕～ 芝居13
26. ～第二幕～ 芝居14
27. ～第二幕～ 今鳥恭介の本音と建前ソング
28. ～第二幕～ 花井春樹の本音と建前ソング
29. ～第二幕～ 芝居15
30. ～第二幕～ 大好きな人
31. ～第二幕～ No More Feel
32. ～第二幕～ 芝居16
33. ～第二幕～ す、す、すきです
34. ～第二幕～ 芝居17
35. ～第二幕～ No More Feel
36. ～第二幕～ す、す、すきです (スタジオレコーディング Ver.)

=== School Rumble Super Twin Album ~School After~ ===
School Rumble Super Twin Album ~School After~

Studio album by Various
- Released: March 24, 2006
- Genre: Drama CD/Anime soundtrack
- Label: King Records

School Rumble Super Twin Album ~School After~ (スクールランブル Super Twin Album ~School After~) is a two disc drama CD and soundtrack album, and a follow up to School Rumble Super Twin Album ~School Tea Cha！~.

==== Track listing ====
Disc 1

1. ドラマ第5話 「懺悔室でお茶会!海原で遭難!」
2. ドラマ第6話 「キストークでドキドキ!」
3. ドラマ第7話 「いよいよ地上戦!」
4. ドラマ第8話 「とうとう海で大決戦!」

Disc 2

1. ステキな予感 - 塚本天満 (小清水亜美)
2. 夕顔 - 塚本八雲 (能登麻美子)
3. The super girl has the super heart - 周防美琴 (生天目仁美)
4. Feel my feeling - 沢近愛理 (堀江由衣)
5. Boy - 高野晶 (清水香里)
6. 毎日がRendez-vous - 一条かれん (南里侑香)
7. Best Friend - サラ・アディエマス (福井裕佳梨)
8. 君へ～風にのせて～ - 播磨拳児 (高橋広樹)
9. Closer - unicorn table
10. 17's Heart - 佐伯美愛
11. He stands the rain - 塚本天満 (小清水亜美)
12. Lovin you - 周防美琴 (生天目仁美)
13. 破天荒ロボ ドジビロンのテーマ - 浪花十三
14. 海の男はよ - 鬼哭丸少年合唱団
15. School Rumble 4 Ever - 塚本天満・周防美琴・沢近愛理・高野晶

=== School Rumble Nigakki: Vocal Best ===
School Rumble Nigakki: Vocal Best

Studio album by Various
- Released: March 21, 2007
- Genre: Album
- Label: Marvelous Entertainment

School Rumble Nigakki: Vocal Best (スクールランブル二学期 ボーカルベスト) is a two disc vocal album featuring the voice actors for several of the characters. The second disc features karaoke versions of the songs in the first disc.

==== Voice actors ====
- Ami Koshimizu (Tenma Tsukamoto)
- Hiroki Takahashi (Kenji Harima)
- Mamiko Noto (Yakumo Tsukamoto)
- Yui Horie (Eri Sawachika)
- Hitomi Nabatame (Mikoto Suō)
- Kaori Shimizu (Akira Takano)
- Yuuka Nanri (Karen Ichijou)
- Yukari Fukui (Sarah Adiemus)

==== Track listing ====
Disc 1

1. せんちめんたる じぇねれ～しょん
2. GIRLS CAN ROCK
3. Feel like a girl
4. チャンス☆だぜ！
5. DEPENDENCE
6. Love ∞
7. Poka Poka
8. 大好きと 抱きしめて 飛ぶ ソング)
9. Love & Peace
10. こころの道
11. ルチャドール
12. NEVER ALONE
13. スクールHEAVEN
14. この涙かあるから次の一歩となる
15. 二人は忘れちゃう

Disc 2

1. せんちめんたる じぇねれ～しょん (カラオケ)
2. GIRLS CAN ROCK (カラオケ)
3. Feel like a girl (カラオケ)
4. チャンス☆だぜ！(カラオケ)
5. DEPENDENCE (カラオケ)
6. Love ∞ (カラオケ)
7. Poka Poka
8. 大好きと 抱きしめて 飛ぶ ソング) (カラオケ)
9. Love & Peace (カラオケ)
10. こころの道 (カラオケ)
11. ルチャドール (カラオケ)
12. NEVER ALONE (カラオケ)
13. スクールHEAVEN(カラオケ)
14. この涙かあるから次の一歩となる (カラオケ)
15. 二人は忘れちゃう(カラオケ)

== Radio dramas ==
=== Ura School Rumble Nigakki Die Another D! ===
Ura School Rumble Nigakki Die Another D!

Studio album by Various
- Released: August 30, 2006
- Genre: Radio drama
- Label: Pioneer LDC

Ura School Rumble Nigakki Die Another D! (裏スクールランブル二学期 ~DIE ANOTHER D!~) is the first radio drama for School Rumble - Second Term, featuring the voice actors Ami Koshimizu, Mamiko Noto, Yui Horie, Hitomi Nabatame, Kaori Shimizu, and Yukari Fukui.

==== Track listing ====
1. 打ち合わせ
2. OPENING
3. M1「Poka Poka」 / サラ・アディエマス(CV. 福井裕佳梨)
4. 前提供クレジット
5. SPECIAL TALK1「スクランに学ぶ人生、略して、スクラン学！」
6. M2「NEVER ALONE」 / 塚本八雲(CV. 能登麻美子)
7. CM中OFF TALK1
8. RADIO DRAMA1「天満と愛理のお料理教室」
9. M3「スクールHEAVEN」 / 塚本天満(CV. 小清水亜美)
10. CM中OFF TALK2
11. SPECIAL TALK2「生天目仁美に10の質問!!」
12. ENDING・後提供クレジット
13. RADIO DRAMA2「美琴の人生相談1 / 相談者：西本願司」
14. 番組終了後

=== Ura School Rumble Nigakki Hime no Kikan! ===
Ura School Rumble Nigakki Hime no Kikan!

Studio album by Various
- Released: November 22, 2006
- Genre: Radio drama
- Label: Pioneer LDC

Ura School Rumble Nigakki Hime no Kikan! (裏スクールランブル二学期 姫の帰還) is the second radio drama for School Rumble - Second Term, featuring the voice actors Mamiko Noto, Hitomi Nabatame, and Kaori Shimizu.

==== Track listing ====
1. 打ち合わせ
2. OPENING・前提供クレジット
3. SPECIAL TALK1「スクランに学ぶ人生、略して、スクラン学!」
4. Love∞
5. 曲送り・CM中OFF TALK1
6. RADIO DRAMA1「天満のアルバイト編」
7. ルチャドール
8. 曲送り・CM中OFF TALK2
9. SPECIAL TALK2「能登麻美子に10の質問!!」
10. こころの道
11. ENDING・後提供クレジット
12. 番組終了後

=== Ura School Rumble Nigakki Megane no Seisen! ===
Ura School Rumble Nigakki Megane no Seisen!

Studio album by Various
- Released: December 22, 2006
- Genre: Radio drama
- Label: Pioneer LDC

Ura School Rumble Nigakki Megane no Seisen! (裏スクールランブル二学期 メガネの聖戦!) is the third radio drama for School Rumble - Second Term, featuring the voice actors Mamiko Noto, Hitomi Nabatame, and Kaori Shimizu, Yui Horie. Shinji Kawada, the voice actor for Haruki Hanai, also appears on this CD. He is not on the other radio dramas for Second Term, and is the only male voice actor to make a vocal appearance in any of the three.

==== Track listing ====
1. 打ち合わせ
2. OPENING・前提供クレジット
3. SPECIAL TALK1「スクランに学ぶ人生、略して、スクラン学!」
4. DEPENDENCE
5. 曲送り・CM中OFF TALK1
6. RADIO DRAMA1「晶の野球実況」
7. チャンス☆だぜ!
8. 曲送り・CM中OFF TALK2
9. SPECIAL TALK2「川田紳司、改・清水香里に10の質問!!」
10. Love&Peace
11. ENDING・後提供クレジット
12. RADIO DRAMA2「美琴の人生相談2/相談者:吉田山次郎」
13. 番組終了後

== Character image albums ==
There are eight character image albums. Each has songs sung by the voice actors for the respective character and drama tracks including other characters' voice actors. Seven of the albums are for female characters: the female protagonist Tenma Tsukamoto, the supporting characters Yakumo Tsukamoto, Mikoto Suo, Eri Sawachika, and Akira Takano, and two minor characters, Karen Ichijou and Sarah Adiemus. The male protagonist of the series, Kenji Harima, is the only male character to have an image album.
