= Natsumi Abe =

Japanese singer and actress

Natsumi Abe 安倍 なつみ
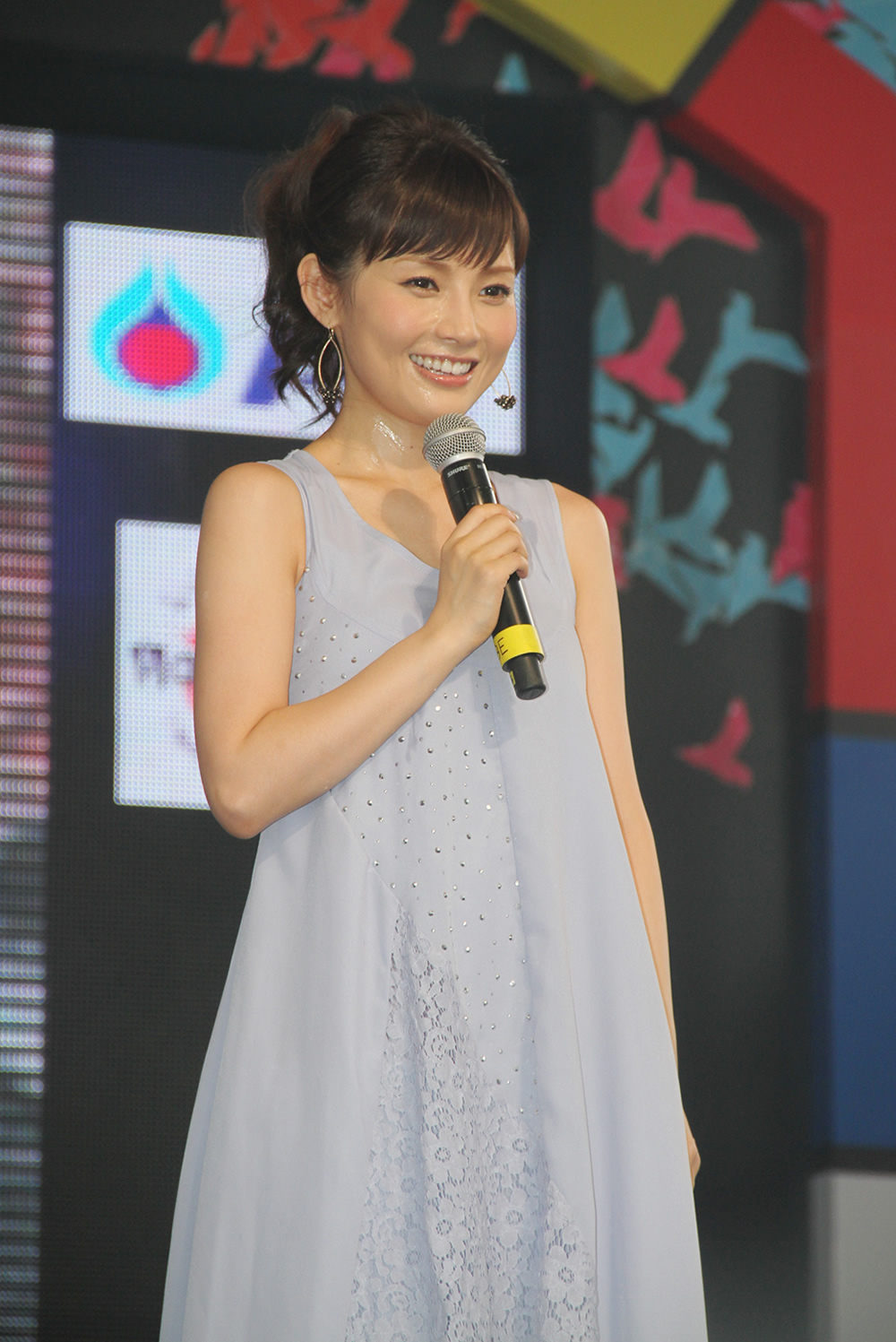
- Abe in 2014

Background information
- Born: August 10, 1981 (age 45); Muroran, Hokkaidō, Japan
- Occupations: Singer; actress; dance
- Member of: Dream Morning Musume
- Formerly of: Morning Musume
- Spouse: Ikusaburo Yamazaki (m. 2015)
- Musical career
- Genres: Pop
- Instruments: Vocals
- Years active: 1997–present
- Labels: Zetima; Hachama
- Website: abe-natsumi.com

Natsumi Abe (安倍 なつみ, Abe Natsumi; born August 10, 1981) is a Japanese singer and actress, a former member of Morning Musume, and a member of Dream Morning Musume.

== Biography ==
She was born in Muroran, Hokkaidō, Japan.

== Career ==
On August 13, 2003, she released her first single, "22 Sai no Watashi," which means "Me, 22 years old," just a few days after her 22nd birthday. Her first full-length album, Hitoribotchi, was then released on February 4, 2004, containing many solo versions of Morning Musume songs. In August 2005, her fifth single, "Koi no Hana," which means "Flower of Love," was released, and she also became a member of the Hello! Project special unit Def.Diva together with Maki Goto, Rika Ishikawa and Aya Matsuura in October. The single "Takaramono" was also released in November credited as "Sen", who is the main character of the drama "Takaramono", played by Abe. In the spring of 2006, Abe released a new single, "Sweet Holic", together with a new album, "2nd ~Shimiwataru Omoi~". June 2006 saw Abe release "The Stress," a cover of the 1989 song by pop idol Chisato Moritaka. In October of the same year "Amasugita Kajitsu" was released, reaching 5th on the Oricon Chart, the highest place she achieved since "Koi no Telephone Goal" in 2004.

On October 5, 2008, Abe performed in an event to mark the 30th anniversary of the Sunshine City building in Ikebukuro. She was joined by other artists who were popular in the 1980s, such as Hiroko Moriguchi and Ayumi Nakamura. It was announced on October 19, 2008, on the official Hello! Project website, that Abe will graduate from Hello! Project along with the rest of Elder Club on March 31, 2009.

On September 15, 2010, Abe released her 12th single, "Ameagari no Niji no Yō ni" (雨上がりの虹のように; "Like a Rainbow After the Rain"). In 2010, it was announced that Natsumi Abe was going to form a new group named "Dream Morning Musume" with several other former Morning Musume members.

In summer 2011, Natsumi Abe was cast in the live action drama Arakawa Under the Bridge as P-ko.

=== Traffic accident ===
On October 7, 2007, Abe's car collided with a motorcyclist in Shibuya, Tokyo. The motorcyclist suffered minor injuries, but Abe was unhurt. She had obtained her driver's license only in July of that year.

== Personal life ==
Abe married fellow actor Ikusaburo Yamazaki in December 2015. The couple has three sons. They welcomed their first child, on July 27, 2016, their second child on October 31, 2018, and their third child on December 27, 2022, respectively.

== Discography ==
=== Singles ===
Title	Release date	Peak chart position	Copies sold	Miscellaneous info
"Haha to Musume no Duet Song" (母と娘のデュエットソング)	April 30, 2003	18	15,689	A duet with Okeisan (おけいさん)
"22 Sai no Watashi" (22歳の私)	August 12, 2003	2	81,460	Used as the theme song for 17 Sai ~Tabidachi no Futari~ (17才〜旅立ちのふたり〜).
"Pi~hyara Kōta" (ピ～ヒャラ小唄)	November 19, 2003	22	16,410	Abe is credited as "Pudding-chan" (プリンちゃん), the song was a double A-side together with MiniHams (ミニハムズ)'s Mirakururun Grand Purin! (ミラクルルン グランプリン!).
"Datte Ikitekanakucha" (だって 生きてかなくちゃ)	June 1, 2004	7	55,113	
"Koi no Telephone Goal" (恋のテレフォン Goal)	August 10, 2004	5	47,351	
"Yume Naraba" (夢ならば)	April 19, 2005	5	36,248	
"Koi no Hana" (恋の花)	August 30, 2005	9	30,450	
"Takaramono" (たからもの; "Treasure")	November 30, 2005	23	11,851	Abe is credited as "Sen" (千) on this release.
"Sweet Holic" (スイートホリック)	April 12, 2006	8	17,087	
"The Stress" (ザ・ストレス)	June 28, 2006	14	14,015	Chisato Moritaka cover.
"Amasugita Kajitsu" (甘すぎた果実)	October 4, 2006	5	22,204	
"Too Far Away ~Onna no Kokoro~" (Too far away ～おんなの心～)	May 9, 2007	15	11,817	
"Iki o Kasanemashō" (息を重ねましょう)	October 24, 2007	13	11,531	
"16sai no Koi Nante" (16歳の恋なんて)	January 16, 2008	9	14,538	A duet with Yajima Maimi (矢島舞美) of °C-ute.
"Screen" (スクリーン)	December 3, 2008	29	6,474	
"Ameagari no Niji no Yō ni" (雨上がりの虹のように; "Like a Rainbow After the Rain")	September 15, 2010	22	3,741	

=== Albums ===
Title	Release date	Peak chart position	Copies sold	Type
Hitoribotchi (一人ぼっち)	February 4, 2004	2	79,483	Studio album
2nd ~Shimiwataru Omoi~ (２ｎｄ～染みわたる想い～)	March 29, 2006	9	23,972	Studio album
25 ~Vingt-Cinq~	March 14, 2007	21	12,825	Mini album
Dreams	June 17, 2015	85		Studio album

== Filmography ==
=== Television ===
- Hello! Morning (ハロー！モーニング。; April 9, 2000 – April 1, 2007)
- Futarigoto (二人ゴト)

=== Dramas ===
- Aiken Rosinante no Sainan ~Mukai Ryūta no Dōbutsu Nikki! (向井荒太の動物日記～愛犬ロシナンテの災難～; January – March 2001)
- Nurseman (ナースマン; January – March 2002)
- Angel Hearts (2002)
- Koinu no Waltz (仔犬のワルツ; April – June 2004)
- Takaramono (November 2005)
- Arakawa Under the bridge (2012)

=== Radio ===
- Hello Pro Yanen !! (ハロプロやねん !!; October 13, 2006)

=== Movies ===
- Morning Cop
- Pinch Runner
- Tokkaekko
- Last Present
- Koinu Dan no Monogatari
- Prison Girl
- Tokyo Decibels

=== Dubbing ===
- PAW Patrol: The Movie, Liberty
- PAW Patrol: The Mighty Movie, Liberty

== Publications ==
=== Photobooks ===
Title	Release date	ISBN	Photobook information
Solo
Natchi (ナッチ)	December 1999	ISBN 4-8470-2556-3	First solo photobook.
Natsumi (なつみ)	November 11, 2001	ISBN 4-8470-2685-3	Second solo photobook.
Deai (出逢い)	February 25, 2004	ISBN 4-8470-2794-9	Third solo photobook.
Natsumi Abe in Hello! Project 2004 Summer	September 28, 2004	ISBN 4-8124-1836-4	
Fu (Fū) (Fu (ふう))	May 27, 2005	ISBN 4-8470-2864-3	Fourth solo photobook.
Abe Natsumi – Triangle Energy (後浦なつみ Triangle Energy)	July 6, 2005	ISBN 4-8124-2249-3	
Abe Natsumi – Alo-Hello! (Abe Natsumi アロハロ!)	November 1, 2005	ISBN 4-04-894262-X	Fifth solo photobook.
Écru	June 12, 2006	ISBN 4-8470-2938-0	Sixth solo photobook.
sCene	March 28, 2007	ISBN 978-4-04-894487-8	Seventh solo photobook.
Cám Ơn	November 25, 2007	ISBN 4-8470-4053-8	Eighth solo photobook. Photographed in Vietnam.
Subway	August 2012	ISBN 978-4-8470-4476-2	Photographed in New York City.
Fin no Hito	November 14, 2015	ISBN 978-4-8470-4801-2	Photographed in Finland.
Group
Pocket Morning Musume (Vol.2) (ポケットモーニング娘。〈Vol.2〉)	September 2003	ISBN 4-8463-0526-0	
Natsumi Abe & Berryz Kobo – Hello! Project 2005 Summer	May 25, 2005	ISBN 4-902577-05-4	
Natsumi Abe & v-u-den – Hello! Project 2006 Winter	April 2006	ISBN 4-8124-2677-4	

=== Essay books ===
Title	Release date	ISBN
Album – 1998–2003	April 2003	ISBN 4-8470-1499-5
Sensei no Dōyōki Ushitsu Isshoni Utaō! Kuizu Tsuki Dōyō Zenshū (せんせいのどうようきょうしついっしょにうたおう!―クイズつき童謡全集)	July 2003	ISBN 4-06-104696-9
22 Sai no Nacchi (22歳のなっち)	September 2003	ISBN 4-88469-335-3
Believe	October 2003	ISBN 4-89809-137-7
Abe Natsumi Photo & Essay Yōkō (Hikari) (安倍なつみフォト&エッセイ 陽光（ひかり）)	May 21, 2004	ISBN 4-8124-1664-7

=== Calendars ===
- Natsumi Abe 2004 Calendar (安倍なつみ 2004カレンダー; Released October 2003)
- Natsumi Abe 2005 Calendar (September 2004)
- Natsumi Abe 2006 Calendar (October 12, 2005)
- Natsumi Abe 2007 Calendar (October 2006)
