= Maki Goto =

Japanese singer and actress (born 1985)

- 後藤 真希
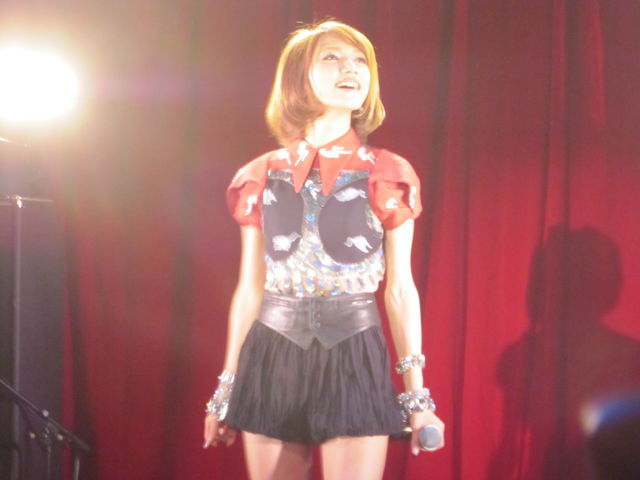
- Goto at Premium Live in 2010
- Born: September 23, 1985 (age 40); Edogawa, Tokyo, Japan
- Occupations: Singer; actress
- Children: 2
- Relatives: Yuki Goto (brother); Moa Serizawa (niece)
- Musical career
- Genres: J-pop
- Instrument: Vocals
- Years active: 1999–2007; 2008–present
- Labels: Zetima; Piccolo Town; Rhythm Zone; Avex Trax
- Formerly of: Morning Musume; Gomattō; Nochiura Natsumi; Def.Diva; Petitmoni; Akagumi 4; 7-nin Matsuri; Sexy 8; Hello! Project

Maki Goto (後藤 真希, Gotō Maki; born September 23, 1985) is a Japanese singer and former actress. Born and raised in Edogawa, Tokyo, Goto began her musical career in 1999 when she joined Morning Musume as the only third generation member. Her first single with the group, "Love Machine", topped the Oricon singles charts and sold over a million copies. Goto was the lead vocalist of the group up until her graduation from the group in 2002. While still a member of Morning Musume, Goto released her debut solo single, "Ai no Bakayarō", in 2001, which topped the Oricon charts. In 2003 she released her debut album, Makking Gold 1, which debuted at number four on the Oricon album charts.

In 2007, at her G-Emotion II: How to Use Sexy concert, Goto announced that she was graduating from Hello! Project. In 2008, Goto signed with Avex Group sub-label Rhythm Zone and returned to the music scene at A-nation '08. In 2009, under the stage name Sweet Black feat. Maki Goto, she released her debut mini album Sweet Black. Goto transferred to Avex Trax in 2010 and released her second mini-album, One, which marked her official comeback as a singer.

== Career ==
=== 1999–2001: Morning Musume ===
In 1999, Goto was selected as the only member of the 3rd generation of Morning Musume. The first single to feature Goto, "Love Machine", sold over a million copies, over nine times the number of copies they had sold for their previous single. Until her graduation from Morning Musume, she was one of the leading vocalists in most of the songs released. During her time in Morning Musume she was one of the founding members of Petitmoni.

=== 2001–2007: Solo career ===
Goto started a solo singing career in 2001 with the single "Ai no Bakayarō." Post-graduation she mostly concentrated on her solo career, and occasionally on temporary Hello! Project units such as Gomattō, Nochiura Natsumi, and Def.Diva. As time passed, she increasingly concentrated on acting in addition to singing. She also performed at the Asia Song Festival 2005 in Busan, Korea, representing Japan.

In early 2007, Goto was chosen to be a member of Morning Musume Tanjō 10 Nen Kinentai – a unit created to celebrate Morning Musume's 10th anniversary as a group. Morning Musume Tanjō 10 Nen Kinentai also consisted of Natsumi Abe, Kaori Iida, Risa Niigaki and Koharu Kusumi. Their first single, "Bokura ga Ikiru My Asia", was released on January 24, 2007. Goto's seventeenth single, "Secret" (シークレット), was released on April 11, 2007. On September 19, 2007, Goto's fourth original album How to Use Sexy was released.

Shortly after her brother's arrest, on October 28, 2007, during the final show of her G-Emotion II: How to Use Sexy tour, Goto suddenly announced to fans that she would be graduating from Hello! Project and leaving Up-Front Agency. Because of her graduation, she would not be able to participate in the Hello! Project 2008 Winter concert tour, previously said to be because of scheduling conflicts. In 2018, Goto revealed that Up-Front Agency had suddenly asked her to leave the company despite already booking her for work, and at the time, she felt that she was unable to say anything. She had originally planned on retiring from the entertainment industry, but reconsidered upon her mother's advice.

=== 2007–2011: Label change to Avex, Sweet Black Project ===
Late in 2007, after her sudden Hello! Project graduation, rumors arose the very next day stating that Avex's CEO, Max Matsuura, had shown interest in signing Goto in for Avex. During Goto's brother trial, she disappeared from the media-eye.

Goto's official blog reopened on March 25, 2008. Over the course of several entries, she revealed that she was in Los Angeles, California, taking singing and dancing lessons. On June 19, 2008, Goto had signed with the record label Rhythm Zone under Avex.

Maki debuted with Avex when she participated in the company's shareholders' meeting on June 22, 2008, singing a cover of Whitney Houston's "Saving All My Love for You." She also participated in A-nation'08. At A-nation, she performed the self-written song "Hear Me", drawing media attention for the first time since her graduation. She also sang "Saving All My Love for You", and a cover of Diana King's "Shy Guy".

In 2008, Goto became involved with The Sweet Black Project, a cross-media collaboration between J-Wave, Avex and Mixi. Goto herself chose the logo and the name, which is meant to reflect the "positive and negative" side of the life of today's women. On January 5, 2009, J-Wave premiered Sweet Black Girls, a 15-minute segment hosted by Goto and Ryū as part of the popular radio show "PLATOn". The show airs from Monday to Friday and focuses on the life of women in their twenties. 30,000 messages were received during the first week alone.

To complete the project, Mixi opened a special space for Sweet Black, and Avex launched a web-documentary on YouTube based on Goto's daily routine as a singer. Promotions were met with immediate success, admittedly beyond expectations.

On January 21, 2009, Goto released her first digital single with Avex, titled "Fly Away". The lyrics, penned by Maki herself, are based on Mambo, a story written by Hitomi Kanehara. On February 25, Goto released her second digital single, titled Lady-Rise, also penned by herself. This time, Goto collaborated with Erika Sakurazawa, a Japanese Josei manga author.

On March 7, 2009, Goto modelled at Tokyo Girls Collection.

Goto released her second mini album, "One", on July 28, 2010. This album and on she had begun to use her actual name rather than her "Sweet Black" stage name. As promotion for this release, Goto appeared on several television shows. One particular show, "Kinyoubi no Suma tachi e", aired a 2-hour special on her life, and included interviews with Goto as well as a performance of one of her new songs, 華詩-hanauta-, written for her mother. This episode reached 19.3% ratings for the show, making it the most watched program of the day.

She released her third EP, LOVE, on May 5, 2011.

=== 2012–present: Recording hiatus and return to public appearances ===
On June 22, 2011, Goto announced on her official website that she would take an indefinite hiatus from her music career beginning in 2012. She continued to make limited minor appearances at public events, such as Dream Morning Musume's concert and starred in a commercial for Monster Hunter. However, in 2014, Goto relaunched her blog stating that she was not "resuming activities right now," and that she will "still [be] on hiatus."

In September 2018, Goto made her first television appearance in six years on the variety show Trio Idol na Onna.

In August 2022, Goto, wearing the "Venus" character costume, competed in the second season of The Masked Singer Japan. She advanced to the final round, along with Mika Ahn and Kouji Yamamoto, and was ultimately declared the winner. In November of the same year, Goto released her first album in 11 years, a collection of covers originally performed on her YouTube channel, entitled Songs of You and Me!

On October 26, 2023, Goto debuted as a virtual YouTuber.

== Personal life ==
Goto's official nickname in Hello! Project is "Gomaki" (ゴマキ), and she is referred to that name sometimes by the press.

In 1996, Goto's father died from a fall while mountaineering. Two years after joining Morning Musume, at the age of 15, Goto purchased a three-story house for her entire family to live in. However, she was also bullied and decided to drop out of high school.

Goto has two older sisters and a younger brother named Yuki Goto, a YouTuber and former rapper of EE Jump. After her brother Yuki was arrested on October 20, 2007, for robbery, the magazine Flash stated that Goto and one of Yuki's accomplices had been romantically involved for some time after meeting at Yūki's wedding in 2005. They have not been in contact with each other since his arrest.

On January 23, 2010, Goto witnessed her mother, Tokiko Goto, falling from the third story of their house in Edogawa, Tokyo at 11 pm. Tokiko was rushed to the hospital, but died from her injuries on January 24 at 1:13 am.

Goto announced on her blog on July 22, 2014, that she had married. She gave birth to a daughter and a son on December 7, 2015, and March 27, 2017, respectively. In March 2019, Japanese weekly magazines reported Goto having an extramarital affair with her 28-year-old ex-boyfriend, whom she met in 2011 and kept in contact through online games. Messages between them had suggested Goto was abused by her husband and planned to divorce him; however, she apologized for the affair on her blog and called the domestic abuse allegations "misleading." Goto's husband is suing the ex-boyfriend for ¥3.3 million for damages.

== Discography ==
- Makking Gold 1 (2003)
- 2 Paint It Gold (2004)
- 3rd Station (2005)
- How to Use Sexy (2007)
- Ai Kotoba (Voice) (2011)
- Songs of You and Me! (2022)

=== Photobooks ===
- [2001.11.06] Maki Goto (後藤真希)
- [2003.03.21] Maki
- [2003.09.??] Pocket Morning Musume. <Vol. 2> (ポケットモーニング娘。〈Vol.2〉) – with Natsumi Abe, Mari Yaguchi and Kaori Iida
- [2003.06.27] More Maki
- [2004.04.24] Prism
- [2004.07.23] Alo-Hello! Maki Goto (アロハロ!後藤真希)
- [2005.04.26] Dear...
- [2006.08.21] Foxy Fungo
- [2011.11.27] Go to Natura...

=== Essay books ===
- [2002.09.??] Maki Goto Myself (後藤真希myself)
- [2002.12.??] Maki Goto Otakara Photo Book (後藤真希お宝フォト)
- [2003.09.23] 99 no Maki Goto (99の後藤真希)
- [2003.12.??] Maki Goto Seishun no Sokuseki (後藤真希 青春の足跡)
- [2005.04.07] Maki Goto Chronicle 1999 – 2004 (19992004―後藤真希クロニクル)

== Filmography ==
=== Films ===
Year	Title	Role	Notes
2000	Pinch Runner (ピンチランナー)	Sanae Hasegawa	
2002	Nama Tamago (ナマタマゴ)		
2002	Koinu Dan no Monogatari (子犬ダンの物語)	Honami Natsume	Supporting role
2003	Seishun Bakachin Ryorijuku (青春ばかちん料理塾)		
2004	Promise Land: Clover no Daibōken	Fumiko Kirishima	Lead role; television movie

=== Television dramas ===
- [2001] Mariya (マリア)
- [2002] Yanpapa (やんぱぱ)
- [2002] Izu no Odoriko (伊豆の踊子)
- [2003] R.P.G.
- [2005] Yoshitsune (義経)
- [2006] Matsumoto Seichō Special Yubi (松本清張スペシャル・指)

=== Musicals ===
- [2003] Ken & Mary no Merikenko on Stage! (けん&メリーのメリケン粉オンステージ!)
- [2004] Sayonara no Love Song (サヨナラのLOVE SONG)
- [2007] Gekidan Senior Graffiti Yokosuka Story (横須賀ストーリー)

=== Radio ===
- [2003–20??] Young Town Dōyōbi (ヤングタウン土曜日)
- [2003–2005] Maki Goto no Makkinkin Radio (後藤真希のマッキンキンRADIO)
- [2009–] J-Wave (81.3 FM) "Sweet Black Girls" (毎週月～木曜日 23:05～23:15 ※「PLATOn」内)

== Tours ==
=== Headlining ===
- Maki Goto in Hello! Project 2003 Summer (後藤真希 in Hello! Project 2003夏)
- Maki Goto in Hello! Project 2004 Winter (後藤真希 in Hello! Project 2004 Winter) (2004)
- Maki Goto Photobook Concert Tour 2004 Spring: Magane Shoku ni Nucchae! (Maki Goto Photobook Concert Tour 2004 Spring~真金色に塗っちゃえ！~) (2004)
- Maki Goto in Hello! Project 2004 summer (後藤真希 in Hello! Project 2004 summer) (2004)
- Maki Goto + Melon Kinenbi Hello! Project 2005 Natsu no Kayō Show −05' Selection! Collection! (後藤真希+メロン記念日Hello!Project2005夏の歌謡ショー―05’セレクション!コレクション!) (2005)
- Maki Goto & Aya Matsuura in Hello! Project 2006 Winter (後藤真希&松浦亜弥in Hello!Project 2006 Winter) (2006)
- Maki Goto Queen Bee!! TOUR 2023 ~SWEET de BLACK na Anniversary & Birthday~ (後藤真希 Queen Bee!! TOUR 2023 ～SWEETでBLACKなAnniversary&Birthday～) (2023)
- Maki Goto 25th anniversary live tour 2024 〜 pr∀yer 〜 (後藤真希 25th anniversary live tour 2024 〜 pr∀yer 〜) (2024)

=== Concert participation ===
- A-Nation'08: Avex All Cast Special Live (2008)
- A-Nation for Life (2011)
