= List of songs written by Tsunku =

Tsunku is a Japanese singer, songwriter, and record producer. In the 1990s, Tsunku rose to fame as the lead singer of the band Sharam Q, where he wrote songs for the band.

During the broadcast of Asayan in search for a new member of Sharam Q, Tsunku gave the opportunity for the runner-ups to debut as Morning Musume in 1997. Since the foundation of the group, Tsunku has been their primary producer. In addition, he later founded Hello! Project in 1998 as a musical collective for Morning Musume. He became the primary producer of their acts, including Aya Matsuura, Maki Goto, Coconuts Musume, V-u-den, Berryz Kobo, and Cute. Outside of Hello! Project, Tsunku became the primary producer of EE Jump, Sonim, and Nice Girl Project!

Outside of artists, Tsunku also produced soundtracks for the Rhythm Heaven video game series and was a contributing artist for ClassicaLoid. In 2015, Tsunku has become the fifth best-selling songwriter in Japan.

== Released songs ==
=== 1998 ===
Album	Artist	Song	Lyrics		Music	
Album	Artist	Song	Credited	With	Credited	With
First Time	Morning Musume	"Morning Coffee" (モーニングコーヒー)	Yes	—N/a	Yes	—N/a
First Time	Morning Musume	"Summer Night Town" (サマーナイトタウン)	Yes	—N/a	Yes	—N/a
—N/a	Morning Musume	"A Memory of Summer '98"	Yes	—N/a	Yes	—N/a
First Time	Morning Musume	"Good Morning"	Yes	—N/a	Yes	—N/a
First Time	Morning Musume	"Dō ni ka Shite Doyōbi" (どうにかして土曜日)	Yes	—N/a	Yes	—N/a
First Time	Morning Musume	"Yume no Naka" (夢の中)	Yes	—N/a	Yes	—N/a
First Time	Morning Musume	"Wagamama" (ワガママ)	Yes	—N/a	Yes	—N/a
First Time	Morning Musume	"Mirai no Tobira" (未来の扉)	Yes	—N/a	Yes	—N/a
First Time	Morning Musume	"Usotsuki Anta" (ウソつきあんた)	Yes	—N/a	Yes	—N/a
First Time	Morning Musume	"Samishii Hi" (さみしい日)	Yes	—N/a	Yes	—N/a
Second Morning	Morning Musume	"Daite Hold on Me!" (抱いてHold on Me!)	Yes	—N/a	Yes	—N/a
—N/a	Morning Musume	"Tatoeba" (例えば)	Yes	—N/a	Yes	—N/a
Tanpopo 1	Tanpopo	"Last Kiss" (ラストキッス)	Yes	—N/a	Yes	—N/a
—N/a	Tanpopo	"Jikan yo Tomare" (時間よ止まれ)	Yes	—N/a	Yes	—N/a

=== 1999 ===
Album	Artist	Song	Lyrics		Music	
Album	Artist	Song	Credited	With	Credited	With
Second Morning	Morning Musume	"Memory Seishun no Hikari" (Memory 青春の光)	Yes	—N/a	Yes	—N/a
—N/a	Morning Musume	"Happy Night"	Yes	—N/a	Yes	—N/a
Second Morning	Morning Musume	"Never Forget"	Yes	—N/a	Yes	—N/a
Second Morning	Morning Musume	"Manatsu no Kōsen" (真夏の光線)	Yes	—N/a	Yes	—N/a
Second Morning	Morning Musume	"Koi no Shihatsu Ressha" (恋の始発列車)	Yes	—N/a	Yes	—N/a
Second Morning	Morning Musume	"Furusato" (ふるさと)	Yes	—N/a	Yes	—N/a
—N/a	Morning Musume	"Wasurerannai" (忘れらんない)	Yes	—N/a	Yes	—N/a
Second Morning	Morning Musume	"Night of Tokyo City"	Yes	—N/a	Yes	—N/a
Second Morning	Morning Musume	"Suki de ×5" (好きで×5)	Yes	—N/a	Yes	—N/a
Second Morning	Morning Musume	"Papa ni Niteiru Kare" (パパに似ている彼)	Yes	—N/a	Yes	—N/a
Second Morning	Morning Musume	"Senkō Hanabi" (せんこう花火)	Yes	—N/a	Yes	—N/a
Second Morning	Morning Musume	"Otome no Shinrigaku" (乙女の心理学)	Yes	—N/a	Yes	—N/a
Second Morning	Morning Musume	"Da Di Du De Do Da Di!" (ダディドゥデドダディ!)	Yes	—N/a	Yes	—N/a
3rd: Love Paradise	Morning Musume	"Love Machine" (LOVEマシーン)	Yes	—N/a	Yes	—N/a
—N/a	Morning Musume	"21 Seiki" (21世紀)	Yes	—N/a	Yes	—N/a
Non-album single	Coconuts Musume	"Halation Summer" (ハレーションサマー)	Yes	—N/a	Yes	—N/a
Non-album single	Coconuts Musume	"Dance & Chance"	Yes	—N/a	Yes	—N/a

=== 2000 ===
Album	Artist	Song	Lyrics		Music		Arrangement	
Album	Artist	Song	Credited	With	Credited	With	Credited	With
Non-album single	EE Jump	"Love is Energy!"	Yes	—N/a	Yes	—N/a	No	Shin Kono
—N/a	EE Jump	"Baby! Tomodachi ni Narou yo" (Baby!友達になろうよ)	Yes	—N/a	Yes	—N/a	No	—N/a

=== 2001 ===
Album	Artist	Song	Lyrics		Music	
Album	Artist	Song	Credited	With	Credited	With
Non-album single	EE Jump	"Hello! Atarashii Watashi" (HELLO!新しい私)	Yes	—N/a	Yes	—N/a
—N/a	EE Jump	"Natsu da yo!" (春だよ!)	Yes	—N/a	Yes	—N/a
Non-album single	EE Jump	"Otto Totto Natsu da ze!" (おっととっと夏だぜ!)	Yes	—N/a	Yes	—N/a
—N/a	EE Jump	"Hey! Mr. Sunshine"	Yes	—N/a	Yes	—N/a
Non-album single	EE Jump	"Iki na Rhythm!" (イキナリズム!)	Yes	—N/a	Yes	—N/a
—N/a	EE Jump	"Kesshin Shita Yoru" (決心した夜)	Yes	—N/a	Yes	—N/a
—N/a	EE Jump	"Nakama tte Ii jan!" (仲間っていいじゃん!)	Yes	—N/a	Yes	—N/a
Hana	EE Jump (feat. Sonim)	"Winter (Samui Kisetsu no Monogatari)" (WINTER-寒い季節の物語-)	Yes	—N/a	Yes	—N/a

=== 2002 ===
Album	Artist	Song	Lyrics		Music	
Album	Artist	Song	Credited	With	Credited	With
Non-album single	EE Jump	"Seishun no Sunrise" (青春のSUNRISE)	Yes	—N/a	Yes	—N/a
—N/a	EE Jump	"Sayonara Shita Hi Kara" (さよならした日から)	Yes	—N/a	Yes	—N/a
Hana	Sonim	"Curry Rice no Onna" (カレーライスの女)	Yes	—N/a	Yes	—N/a
—N/a	Sonim	"Ai wa Motto Sou Janakute" (愛はもっとそうじゃなくて)	Yes	—N/a	Yes	—N/a
Hana	Sonim	"Tsugaru Kaikyō no Onna" (津軽海峡の女)	Yes	—N/a	Yes	—N/a
—N/a	Sonim	"Missing You"	Yes	—N/a	Yes	—N/a

=== 2003 ===
Album	Artist	Song	Lyrics		Music	
Album	Artist	Song	Credited	With	Credited	With
Koinu Dan no Monogatari: Original Soundtrack	Morning Musume, Hello! Project Kids, Maki Goto	"Ganbacchae!" (がんばっちゃえ!)	Yes	—N/a	Yes	—N/a
Koinu Dan no Monogatari: Original Soundtrack	Morning Musume	"Hey! Mirai" (HEY! 未来)	Yes	—N/a	Yes	—N/a
Hana	Sonim	"Tokyo Midnight Loneliness" (東京ミッドナイト ロンリネス)	Yes	—N/a	Yes	—N/a
—N/a	Sonim	"Natsu ga Konai" (夏が来ない)	Yes	—N/a	Yes	—N/a
Hana	Sonim	"Suki na Hito Dakara" (好きな人だから)	Yes	—N/a	Yes	—N/a
Hana	Sonim	"Kokuryō" (国領)	Yes	—N/a	Yes	—N/a
Hana	Sonim	"Funkise yo!" (奮起せよ!)	Yes	—N/a	Yes	—N/a
Hana	Sonim	"Heibonteki Joshi na Jōken" (平凡的女子な条件)	Yes	—N/a	Yes	—N/a
Hana	Sonim	"See You!"	Yes	—N/a	Yes	—N/a
Non-album single	Sonim	"Gōkon Ato no FamiRes Nite" (合コン後のファミレスにて)	Yes	—N/a	Yes	—N/a
—N/a	Sonim	"Ada Boy & Da Girl"	Yes	—N/a	Yes	—N/a
Non-album single	ZYX	"Iku ZYX! Fly High" (行くZYX!FLY HIGH)	Yes	—N/a	Yes	—N/a
Non-album single	ZYX	"Shiroi Tokyo" (白いTOKYO)	Yes	—N/a	Yes	—N/a

=== 2004 ===
Album	Artist	Song	Lyrics		Music	
Album	Artist	Song	Credited	With	Credited	With
Non-album single	Mini-Moni	"Lucky Cha Cha Cha!" (ラッキーチャチャチャ！)	Yes	—N/a	Yes	—N/a
—N/a	Mini-Moni	"Egao no Date Saigo no Date" (笑顔のデート 最後のデート)	Yes	—N/a	Yes	—N/a
2nd W	W	"Aa Ii na!" (あぁ いいな!)	Yes	—N/a	Yes	—N/a
—N/a	W	"Otome no Keitai Denwa no Himitsu" (乙女の携帯電話の秘密)	Yes	—N/a	Yes	—N/a
2nd W	W	"Robo Kiss" (ロボキッス)	Yes	—N/a	Yes	—N/a
—N/a	W	"Sexy Snow"	Yes	—N/a	Yes	—N/a
All for One & One for All!	H.P. All Stars	"All for One & One for All!"	Yes	—N/a	Yes	—N/a
All for One & One for All!	Atsuko Inaba, Masae Ohtani, Ayumi Shibata, Aya Matsuura	"Sankaku Kankei" (三角関係)	Yes	—N/a	Yes	—N/a
All for One & One for All!	Reina Tanaka, Megumi Murakami, Airi Suzuki	"Suki ni Naccha Ikenai Hito" (好きになっちゃいけない人)	Yes	—N/a	Yes	—N/a

== Unreleased songs ==
Artist	Song	Lyrics		Music		Arrangement		Notes
Artist	Song	Credited	With	Credited	With	Credited	With	Notes
Yuki	"Shitamachi Sodachi no Boku Dakara" (下町育ちの僕だから)	Yes	—N/a	Yes	—N/a	No	—N/a	Originally written for EE Jump's 2002 album, EE Jump Collection 1, which was later cancelled

== Soundtracks ==
=== 2016 ===
Album	Artist	Song	Lyrics		Music		Arrangement	
Album	Artist	Song	Credited	With	Credited	With	Credited	With
Non-album single	Smile Kiss	"Utae! Ai no Kōyaku" (歌え!愛の公約)	Yes	—N/a	Yes	—N/a	No	—N/a
ClassicaLoid Musik Collection Vol. 1	Merumo Hisaoka, Kaori Horiuchi, Reiko Kubota, The Ichi-chōme Philharmonic Chorus	"Shalala Nayandete mo Kaiketsusen" (from The Nutcracker) (SHALALA 悩んでても解決せん ～くるみ割り人形より～)	Yes	—N/a	No	—N/a	Yes (Note: Credited as Tsunku ClassicaLoid Music Troupe (つんく♂クラシカロイド楽団).)	Kaoru Ōkubo

=== 2018 ===
Album	Artist	Song	Lyrics		Music		Arrangement	
Album	Artist	Song	Credited	With	Credited	With	Credited	With
ClassicaLoid Musik Collection Vol. 2	Hikaru Ōhashi; U.M.E.D.Y.	"Maryoku no Aria" (魔力のアリア)	Yes	—N/a	No	—N/a	Yes	Kaoru Ōkubo
