= Dreams 1 =

Dreams (1)

Studio album by Dream Morning Musume
- Released: April 20, 2011
- Recorded: 2011
- Genre: J-pop
- Label: zetima
- Producer: Tsunku

Dream Morning Musume chronology
-	Dreams (1)	-

Dreams 1 (ドリムス。(1) Dorimusu Wan), stylized as Dreams (1), is Dream Morning Musume's first original studio album.

== Overview ==
It was released on April 20, 2011. The album was released in two editions: a regular, 2-CD set and a limited edition, 2 CD+DVD combo. The 1st CD contains remakes of past singles, album tracks and one "commercial song" from Afternoon Musume, called Afternoon Coffee. The 2nd CD is basically a compilation of Morning Musume's early singles in their original recordings. The DVD contained two bonus materials.

== Track listing ==
=== Disc 1 ===
1. Atto Odoroku Mirai ga Yattekuru!
2. Joshi Kashimashi Monogatari (2011 Dreams Ver.)
3. Mikan
4. Roman (My Dear Boy)
5. Aijin no Youna Kao Oshite
6. Morning Coffee (2011 Dreams Ver.)
7. Sexy Boy (Soyokaze ni Yorisotte)
8. Ame no Furanai Hoshi dewa Aisenai Daro?
9. Aozora ga Itsumademo Tsuzuku You na Mirai de Are!
10. Afternoon Coffee

=== Disc 2 ===
1. Summer Night Town
2. Daite Hold on Me!
3. Memory Seishun no Hikari
4. Love Machine
5. Koi no Dance Site
6. Happy Summer Wedding
7. I Wish
8. Ren'ai Revolution 21
9. The Peace!
10. Sōda! We're Alive

=== DVD ===
1. 2011.01.28 Debut Event Digest
2. Jacket Photoshoot Making of
