= Best! Morning Musume 1 =

Greatest hits album by Morning Musume
- Released: January 31, 2001
- Recorded: 1998–2001
- Genre: Japanese pop; electropop; dance; pop rock; house
- Length: 70:17
- Label: Zetima
- Producer: Tsunku

Morning Musume chronology
3rd-Love Paradise (2000)	Best! Morning Musume 1 (2001)	4th Ikimasshoi! (2002)

Singles from Best! Morning Musume 1
- 1. "Happy Summer Wedding" Released: May 17, 2000; 2. "I Wish" Released: September 6, 2000; 3. "Ren'ai Revolution 21" Released: December 13, 2000

Best! Morning Musume 1 (ベスト！モーニング娘。１) is the first "best of" compilation from the J-pop idol group Morning Musume, and was released January 31, 2001. It is currently the largest selling album of their career and sold a total of 2,259,510 copies. It contained their first eleven singles in non-chronological order (with their biggest single to date, "Love Machine", starting off the track sequence) and some other album and single favorites; it also included a new song, "Say Yeah!: Motto Miracle Night." The first press came in special packaging with a mini board game.

== Track listing ==
1. "Love Machine" (Loveマシーン)
2. "Daite Hold on Me!" (抱いてHold on Me!)
3. "Koi no Dance Site" (恋のダンスサイト)
4. "Summer Night Town" (サマーナイトタウン)
5. "Happy Summer Wedding" (ハッピーサマーウエディング)
6. "I Wish"
7. "Ren'ai Revolution 21" (恋愛レボリューション21)
8. "Memory Seishun no Hikari" (Memory～青春の光～)
9. "Manatsu no Kōsen" (真夏の光線)
10. "Morning Coffee" (モーニングコーヒー)
11. "Furusato" (ふるさと)
12. "Say Yeah!: Motto Miracle Night" (Say Yeah!" もっとミラクルナイト)
13. "Dance Suru no Da!" (Danceするのだ!)
14. "Never Forget"
15. "Ai no Tane" (愛の種)

== Sales and certifications ==
Region	Certification	Certified units/sales
Taiwan (RIT)	Gold	32,281
