= Manatsu no Kōsen =

Single by Morning Musume

from the album Second Morning
- Released: May 12, 1999 (JP)
- Recorded: 1999
- Genre: Japanese Pop
- Length: 14:33 (8 cm CD); 19:42 (12 cm CD)
- Label: zetima
- Producer: Tsunku

Morning Musume singles chronology
"Memory Seishun no Hikari" (1999)	"Manatsu no Kōsen" (1999)	"Furusato" (1999)

Music video
- Manatsu no Kōsen on YouTube

"Manatsu no Kōsen" (真夏の光線, A ray of light in midsummer) is the fifth single of the J-pop idol group Morning Musume, released on May 12, 1999, as an 8 cm CD. It sold a total of 235,010 copies, and reached number three on the Oricon Charts. In 2004, it was re-released as part of the Early Single Box and again in 2005, as a 12 cm CD. The lead vocalist of this single was Natsumi Abe. It was first single without Asuka Fukuda.

== Track listing ==
=== 8 cm CD ===
1. Manatsu no Kōsen (真夏の光線, A ray of light in midsummer) – 5:07
2. Koi no Shihatsu Ressha (恋の始発列車, Love's first train) – 4:20
3. Manatsu no Kōsen (Instrumental) (真夏の光線 (Instrumental)) – 5:06

=== 12 cm CD (Early Single Box and individual release) ===
1. Manatsu no Kōsen (真夏の光線) – 5:09
2. Koi no Shihatsu Ressha (恋の始発列車) – 4:22
3. Manatsu no Kōsen (Instrumental) (真夏の光線 (Instrumental)) – 5:11
4. Manatsu no Kōsen (Early Version) (真夏の光線 (Early Version)) – 5:00

== Members at time of single ==
- 1st generation: Yuko Nakazawa, Aya Ishiguro, Kaori Iida, Natsumi Abe
- 2nd generation: Kei Yasuda, Mari Yaguchi, Sayaka Ichii
