= Ai no Tane =

Single by Morning Musume

from the album First Time
- Released: November 3, 1997
- Recorded: 1997
- Genre: J-pop
- Length: 4:13
- Label: Uraneba
- Songwriters: Saeki Kenzō, Tetsutarō Sakurai
- Producer: Tsunku

Morning Musume singles chronology
"Ai no Tane" (1997)	"Morning Coffee" (1998)

Music video
- "Ai no Tane" on YouTube

"Ai no Tane" (愛の種, The Seeds of Love) is the unofficial debut single of Japanese pop idol group Morning Musume, released under a defunct Up-Front Group-affiliated independent label on November 3, 1997. It is sometimes called the "zeroth single"—"Morning Coffee" (モーニングコーヒー) being the "first single" and so on.

It was later included in many other Morning Musume releases: in their first official single "Morning Coffee"; their first album, First Time (ファーストタイム); and their first "Best of" compilation, Best! Morning Musume 1. An instrumental for this song was included in the bonus karaoke disc in the Early Single Box.

== History ==
In 1997, Sharan Q organized a talent search competition named "Josei Rokku Vōkarisuto Ōdishon" (女性ロックヴォーカリストオーディション) under the show Asayan. After the competition, producer and Sharan Q vocalist Tsunku offered Yuko Nakazawa, Aya Ishiguro, Kaori Iida, Natsumi Abe, and Asuka Fukuda—five of the ten losers of the competition—the chance to be taken under his wing on one condition: to sell 50,000 copies of their debut single, which turned out to be "Ai no Tane." The girls agreed to the challenge and were named Morning Musume; thus, the recording of the song began.

=== Production and distribution ===
Recordings began on mid-September as well as the photoshoot for the CD cover. During the production, the group faced a big issue regarding with Yuko Nakazawa. At the beginning, Nakazawa wore long hair that was originally featured in their single's cover. She later cut it short before debuting publicly. This act caused for a re-shoot of the cover and her solo lines in the song's bridge.

The single was released and first distributed on November 3 at Shinsaibashi, Osaka, selling 16,610 copies, and then on November 9 at Fukuoka with 9,004 copies. Distribution continued on November 23 at Sapporo with 14,853 copies. During this event, Kaori Iida was hospitalized because her contact lens broke and caused temporary blindness. She was able to come back before the fourth day of "Ai no Tane" distribution at Nagoya embarked; they sold 9,533 copies. After four days of distribution, the five girls accomplished their task and were officially under Tsunku's care.

== Personnel ==
- Morning Musume – vocals
- Saeki Kenzō – lyricist
- Tetsutarō Sakurai – composer, arranger, and chorus
- Yūji Yokozeni – drums
- Masahiki Rokugawa – bass
- Kiyoshi Tsuchiya – guitar
- Shin Kono – piano and keyboard

== Members at time of single ==
- 1st generation (debut): Yuko Nakazawa, Aya Ishiguro, Kaori Iida, Natsumi Abe, Asuka Fukuda
