= Live: Legend 1999 & 1997 Apocalypse =

2014 live video album by Babymetal

- Blu-ray cover

Live album and video by Babymetal
- Released: October 29, 2014 (video); August 25, 2021 (live album)
- Recorded: June 30, 2013 (Legend "1999"); December 21, 2013 (Legend "1997")
- Venues: NHK Hall (Legend "1999"); Makuhari Messe (Legend "1997")
- Genres: Kawaii metal; J-pop; heavy metal
- Length: 75:28 (Legend "1999"); 82:24 (Legend "1997")
- Labels: BMD Fox; Toy's Factory; Amuse
- Director: Inni Vision
- Producer: Kobametal

Babymetal album chronology
Live: Legend I, D, Z Apocalypse (2021)	Live: Legend 1999 & 1997 Apocalypse (2021)	Live in London: Babymetal World Tour 2014 (2021)

Babymetal video chronology
Live: Legend I, D, Z Apocalypse (2013)	Live: Legend 1999 & 1997 Apocalypse (2014)	Live at Budokan: Red Night & Black Night Apocalypse (2015)

Live: Legend 1999 & 1997 Apocalypse is the second live video release by the Japanese heavy metal band Babymetal. The album contains live footage of two shows, entitled Legend "1999" and Legend "1997" (named after birth years of the members of Babymetal), performed in Japan in 2013. It was released in 2-disc DVD and Blu-ray formats on October 29, 2014.

== Background ==
On February 2, 2013, Babymetal announced a show at NHK Hall on June 30, 2013, with tickets reportedly sold out almost immediately, on March 15, 2013. After the show, the band announced the show Legend "1997" set for December 21, 2013 at Makuhari Messe. About 8,000 people were present in the crowd for Legend "1997".

Live: Legend 1999 & 1997 Apocalypse was first announced on August 16, 2014, with an official trailer released on September 11, 2014. The video was released on October 29, 2014, containing the two concerts, Legend "1999" Yuimetal & Moametal Seitansai, and Legend "1997" Su-metal Seitansai, and were released in standard DVD and Blu-ray editions, and "Babymetal Apocalypse Web" fanclub exclusive "Babymetal Apocalypse Limited Box" editions additionally containing merchandise such as commemorative T-shirts and messages from the three members.

To commemorate the release, a digest of the shows was regularly broadcast by Yunika Vision onto Tokyo Station and Seibu-Shinjuku Station from October 23, 2014 to November 2, 2014. Customers who purchased the album at Tower Records stores could receive merchandise, such as a collaborative poster for No Music, No Idol?, volume 70, which had been announced prior on October 20, 2014. A promotion including a calendar card was also made available with a purchase; this was limited to the Tower Records store in Shinjuku.

The album also had a vinyl on August 25, 2021 to commemorate the band's tenth anniversary.

== Content ==
The concert Legend "1999" was performed on June 30, 2013, in between the 14th birthdays of Mizuno and Kikuchi. 3,600 attended the show at NHK Hall. Notably, Mizuno and Kikuchi cover the Petitmoni song "Chokotto Love" and Morning Musume song "Love Machine" (which were both released in 1999), respectively. The songs are subtitled Big Time Changes and From Hell With Love, respectively, and are named after albums released by heavy metal band Seikima-II. Additionally, Nakamoto debuts the power ballad "No Rain, No Rainbow", with Mizuno and Kikuchi later appearing to play the piano together; the song would later appear on the band's second album Metal Resistance.

The concert Legend "1997" begins with "Headbangeeeeerrrrr!!!!!" (Night of 15 mix), where Mizuno and Kikuchi begin on stage, while Nakamoto appears on a raised platform. The performance debuts the song "Gimme Chocolate!!", as well as an unfinished arrangement of "Akatsuki". In the encore, Mizuno and Kikuchi join as Black Santa Claus, performing "Onedari Daisakusen", and Nakamoto is ultimately tied up on a cross to be crucified during the final song "Babymetal Death".

== Reception ==
Live: Legend 1999 & 1997 Apocalypse debuted on the Oricon daily DVD and Blu-ray charts, both at number four, on October 29, 2014, and peaked at number eight and four on the Oricon weekly DVD and Blu-ray charts, respectively, on the week of November 10, 2014. This also marked the band's debut on the weekly DVD chart. The video also peaked at number six and three, respectively in the music video sub-charts the same week.

== Track listing ==
Legend "1999" Yuimetal & Moametal Seitansai, 6/30/2013 at NHK Hall (Legend "1999" Yuimetal & Moametal 聖誕祭 2013/6/30 at NHKホール)
No.	Title	Writer(s)	Length
1.	"Babymetal Death"	Kitsune of Metal God	6:01
2.	"Iine!" (いいね！)	Nakata Caos; Mish-Mosh	4:16
3.	"Kimi to Anime Ga Mitai – Answer for Animation With You" (君とアニメが見たい 〜Answer for Animation With You)	Kiba of Akiba	4:08
4.	"Uki Uki ★ Midnight" (ウ・キ・ウ・キ★ミッドナイト)	Ryu-metal; Fuji-metal; Nakata Caos; Team-K	3:35
5.	"Chokotto Love" (Big Time Changes ver.) (ちょこっとLOVE -BIG TIME CHANGES ver.-) (Petitmoni cover)	Tsunku	4:04
6.	"Love Machine" (From Hell With Love ver.) (LOVE マシーン -FROM HELL WITH LOVE ver.-) (Morning Musume cover)	Tsunku	3:31
7.	"Onedari Daisakusen" (おねだり大作戦)	Nakata Caos; Ryu-metal; Fuji-metal; Team-K	5:55
8.	"No Rain, No Rainbow"	Yoshifu-metal; Mk-metal; Nakametal	6:34
9.	"Catch Me If You Can"	Edometal; Narasaki	4:30
10.	"Doki Doki ☆ Morning" (ド・キ・ド・キ☆モーニング)	Nakametal; Norizō; Motonari Murakawa	3:50
11.	"Megitsune" (メギツネ)	Mk-metal; Norimetal	4:26
12.	"Ijime, Dame, Zettai" (イジメ、ダメ、ゼッタイ)	Nakametal; Tsubometal; Kxbxmetal; Takemetal	8:04
13.	"Akatsuki" (紅月 -アカツキ-) (encore)	Nakametal; Tsubometal	7:27
14.	"Headbangeeeeerrrrr!!!!!" (ヘドバンギャー！！) (encore)	Edometal; Nakametal; Narasaki	8:52
Total length:			75:28

Legend "1997" Su-metal Seitansai, 12/21/2013 at Makuhari Messe Event Hall (Legend "1997" Su-Metal 聖誕祭 2013/12/21 at 幕張メッセイベントホール)
No.	Title	Writer(s)	Length
1.	"Headbangeeeeerrrrr!!!!!" (Night of 15 Mix) (ヘドバンギャー!! -Night of 15 mix-)	Edometal; Nakametal; Narasaki	9:52
2.	"Doki Doki ☆ Morning" (ド・キ・ド・キ☆モーニング)	Nakametal; Norizō; Murakawa	3:50
3.	"Iine!" (いいね！)	Nakata Caos; Mish-Mosh	4:13
4.	"Soul's Refrain" (魂のルフラン Tamashii no Rufuran) (Yoko Takahashi cover)	Neko Oikawa; Toshiyuki Ōmori	6:30
5.	"Uki Uki ★ Midnight" (ウ・キ・ウ・キ★ミッドナイト)	Ryu-metal; Fuji-metal; Nakata Caos; Team-K	3:30
6.	"Gimme Chocolate!!" (ギミチョコ！！)	Mk-metal; Kxbxmetal; Takeshi Ueda	5:22
7.	"Kimi to Anime Ga Mitai – Answer for Animation With You" (君とアニメが見たい 〜Answer for Animation With You)	Kiba of Akiba	3:58
8.	"Megitsune" (メギツネ)	Mk-metal; Norimetal	4:23
9.	"Ijime, Dame, Zettai" (イジメ、ダメ、ゼッタイ)	Nakametal; Tsubometal; Kxbxmetal; Takemetal	7:46
10.	"Onedari Daisakusen" (おねだり大作戦) (encore)	Nakata Caos; Ryu-metal; Fuji-metal; Team-K	5:06
11.	"Catch Me If You Can" (encore)	Edometal; Narasaki	5:36
12.	"Headbangeeeeerrrrr!!!!!" (ヘドバンギャー！！) (encore)	Edometal; Nakametal; Narasaki	6:29
13.	"Akatsuki" (Unfinished ver.) (紅月 -アカツキ- (Unfinished ver.)) (encore)	Nakametal; Tsubometal	5:03
14.	"Babymetal Death" (encore)	Kitsune of Metal God	10:29
Total length:			82:24

Notes

- "Kimi to Anime Ga Mitai – Answer for Animation With You", "Chokotto Love", "Love Machine", and "Soul's Refrain" are excluded from the digital live album release.

== Personnel ==
Credits adapted from Live: Legend 1999 & 1997 Apocalypse booklet.

- Su-metal (Suzuka Nakamoto) – lead and background vocals, dance
- Yuimetal (Yui Mizuno) – lead and background vocals (credited as "scream"), dance
- Moametal (Moa Kikuchi) – lead and background vocals (credited as "scream"), dance

== Charts ==
=== Weekly charts ===
Chart (2014–2021)	Peak position
Japanese Albums (Oricon)	167
Japanese DVD (Oricon)	8
Japanese Music DVD (Oricon)	6
Japanese Blu-ray (Oricon)	4
Japanese Music Blu-ray (Oricon)	3

=== Daily charts ===
Chart (2014)	Peak position
Japanese DVD (Oricon)	4
Japanese Blu-ray (Oricon)	4

== Release history ==
Region	Date	Format	Label	Edition(s)	Catalog	Ref.
Japan	October 29, 2014	DVD; Blu-ray	BMD Fox Records; Toy's Factory; Amuse, Inc.	Standard video	TFBQ-18153; TFXQ-78116	
Japan	October 29, 2014	DVD; Blu-ray	BMD Fox Records; Toy's Factory; Amuse, Inc.	"Babymetal Apocalypse Limited Box" set	PPTF-1014; PPTF-7002	
Japan	August 25, 2021	LP	BMD Fox Records; Toy's Factory; Amuse, Inc.	Live album	TFJC-38067/70	
