= Ren'ai Revolution 21 =

2000 single by Morning Musume

Single by Morning Musume

from the album Best! Morning Musume 1 & 4th Ikimasshoi!
- Released: December 13, 2000 (JP)
- Recorded: 2000
- Genre: J-pop; electropop; dance-pop; electrodance
- Length: 14:04
- Label: Zetima
- Songwriter: Tsunku
- Producer: Tsunku

Morning Musume singles chronology
"I Wish" (2000)	"Ren'ai Revolution 21" (2000)	"The Peace!" (2001)

Music video
- Ren'ai Revolution 21 on YouTube

"Ren'ai Revolution 21" (or "Renai Revolution 21") (恋愛レボリューション21, Renai Reboryūshon Nijūichi; Love Revolution 21) is Morning Musume's 11th single, and was released December 13, 2000. It sold a total of 986,040 copies and peaked at number two on the Oricon Charts. The lead vocals of this single are Natsumi Abe and Maki Goto. This single also marks the last with Yuko Nakazawa before she graduated from Morning Musume to pursue her solo career within the Hello! Project. The dance appeared in the PV and their live performance was choreographed by Mayumi Natsu.

== Members at the time of single ==
- 1st generation: Yuko Nakazawa (last single), Kaori Iida, Natsumi Abe
- 2nd generation: Kei Yasuda, Mari Yaguchi
- 3rd generation: Maki Goto
- 4th generation: Rika Ishikawa, Hitomi Yoshizawa, Nozomi Tsuji, Ai Kago

== Track listing ==
All lyrics are composed by Tsunku.

1. "Ren'ai Revolution 21" (恋愛レボリューション21)
2. "Inspiration!" (インスピレーション！)
3. "Ren'ai Revolution 21" (Instrumental)

== Personnel ==
- Tsunku – composer, background vocals
- Dance☆Man – arranger (track 1)
- Shunsuke Suzuki – arranger (track 2)
- Masahiro Kobayashi – horn arranger (track 2)

== Other versions and covers ==
A "13-nin (13 people)" version of the song was rerecorded by the 2002 lineup with Ai Takahashi, Risa Niigaki, Makoto Ogawa and Asami Konno for the album 4th Ikimashoi!; the original single version appears on Best! Morning Musume 1 and All Singles Complete: 10th Anniversary; the updated version is sung by the current 2013 lineup in The Best! ~Updated Morning Musume~.

This song was covered by Taiwanese girl groups 4 in Love and Ice Creamusume, as well as Korean artist Hyun Young, and remixed by DJ Command feat. うさ＆ともみん in Beatmania IIDX 18 Resort Anthem. The song is also included as one of the 28 tracks in Just Dance Wii. There are two version for this song is called Futomen Revolution and Ramen Revolution. These two versions are used in the Nissin's Futomen Dodo commercials.
