= First Time (Morning Musume album) =

Studio album by Morning Musume
- Released: July 8, 1998
- Recorded: 1997–1998
- Genre: J-pop; pop rock; dance-pop
- Length: 43:06
- Label: Zetima
- Producer: Tsunku

Morning Musume chronology
First Time (1998)	Second Morning (1999)

Singles from First Time
- 1. "Ai no Tane" Released: November 3, 1997; 2. "Morning Coffee" Released: January 28, 1998; 3. "Summer Night Town" Released: May 27, 1998

First Time (ファーストタイム) is the first album from the J-pop idol girl group Morning Musume. It was released on July 8, 1998, and sold 310,290 copies. It featured only 1st and 2nd generation members had ten of their top selling songs from the beginning of their career, including "Ai no Tane" and "Morning Coffee".

== Track listing ==
No.	Title	Length
1.	"Good Morning"	4:07
2.	"Summer Night Town (サマーナイトタウン)"	3:48
3.	"Dō ni ka Shite Doyōbi (どうにかして土曜日, Do Something about Saturday)"	3:42
4.	"Morning Coffee (モーニングコーヒー)"	4:31
5.	"Yume no Naka (夢の中, Inside a Dream)"	5:00
6.	"Ai no Tane (愛の種, Seeds of Love)"	4:13
7.	"Wagamama (ワガママ, Selfishness)"	4:59
8.	"Mirai no Tobira (未来の扉, Door to the Future)"	4:11
9.	"Usotsuki Anta (ウソつきあんた, You Liar)"	4:02
10.	"Samishii Hi (さみしい日, Sad Day)"	4:33

== Personnel ==
- Natsumi Abe – vocals
- Asuka Fukuda – vocals
- Aya Ishiguro – vocals
- Yuko Nakazawa – vocals
- Kaori Iida – vocals
- Mari Yaguchi – vocals (except on "Morning Coffee" and "Ai No Tane")
- Sayaka Ichii – vocals (except on "Morning Coffee" and "Ai No Tane")
- Kei Yasuda – vocals (except on "Morning Coffee" and "Ai No Tane")
- Tsunku – songwriting (except on Track 6), tambourine (Track 9), backing vocal (Track 10)
- Masahiro Inaba – electric guitar (Tracks 1,2,3,5,8)
- Yasuaki Maejima – acoustic piano (Tracks 1,5,10), keyboards (Tracks 1,2,5), MIDI and drum machine programming (Tracks 1,2,3,5), bongo and wind chime (Track 5), Fender Rhodes piano (Track 9)
- Gen Ogimi – percussion (Track 2)
- Mansaku Kimura – drums (Track 3)
- Masafumi Yokoyama – bass (Track 3)
- Shiro Sasaki – trumpet (Track 3), flugelhorn (Track 5)
- Futoshi Kobayashi – trumpet (Track 3)
- Wakaba Kawai – trombone (Track 3)
- Kan Nishida – bass trombone (Track 3)
- Nobuyuki Mori – tenor sax (Track 3)
- Yuichi Takahashi – 12-string guitar (Track 4), acoustic guitar (Tracks 4, 5), MIDI and drum machine programming (Tracks 3, 9)
- Kiyoshi Tsuchiya – electric guitar (Track 4)
- Shin Kono – acoustic piano, keyboards (Track 4,6)
- Tetsutaro Sakurai – MIDI and drum programming (Track 4), backing vocals (Track 6)
- Satoshi Sano – trombone (Track 5)
- Kinbara Group – strings (Track 5)
- Yuji Yokozeni – drums (Track 6, 7)
- Masahiko Rokukawa – bass (Track 6)
- Kiyoshi Tsuchiya – electric guitar (Track 6)
- Hitoshi Watanabe – bass (Track 7)
- Shunsuke Kurō – electric guitar, MIDI and drum machine programming (Track 7)
- Ryuosuke Imai – MIDI and drum programming, turntable (Track 8)
- Noriyasu Kawamura – drums (Track 9)
- Chiharu Mikuzuki – bass (Track 9)
- Takashi Masuzaki – electric and acoustic guitars (Track 9)

=== Production ===
- Engineers: Kazumi Matsui, Taakahisa Yuzawa, Takeshi Yanagisawa, Takahiro Suzuki, Yoshihide Mikami, Takeshi Inaba, Akimi Tani
- Assistant Engineers: Ryo Wakizaka, Shinosuki Kobayahi, Hiroyuki Akita, Tomoyuki Niitsu, Kentaro Kikuchi, Hisashi Nagayama
- Mastering Engineer: Mitsuo Koike
