= Furusato (Morning Musume song) =

Single by Morning Musume

from the album Second Morning
- Released: July 14, 1999 (JP)
- Recorded: 1999
- Genre: J-pop
- Length: 15:23 (8 cm CD); 20:56 (12 cm CD)
- Label: Zetima
- Songwriter: Tsunku
- Producer: Tsunku

Morning Musume singles chronology
"Manatsu no Kōsen" (1999)	"Furusato" (1999)	"Love Machine" (1999)

Music video
- Furusato on YouTube

"Furusato" (ふるさと, Hometown) is the sixth single of the J-pop idol group Morning Musume, released on July 14, 1999 as an 8 cm CD. It has sold over 170,670 copies and reached number five on the Oricon Charts. In 2004 it was re-released as part of the Early Single Box and again in 2005 as a 12 cm CD. The lead vocalist of this single was Natsumi Abe.

Furusato has since become a Morning Musume/Hello! Project standard, with many Morning Musume members having sung their own solo versions. As of September 2005, versions by Nozomi Tsuji, Mari Yaguchi, Ai Takahashi and Risa Niigaki were released to fan club members, while Yuko Nakazawa has done an acoustic version on her second solo album, Natsumi Abe has re-recorded it for her 2004 solo album Hitoribocchi and Junjun sang it as her graduation song on December 15, 2010.

== Track listing ==
=== 8 cm CD ===
1. Furusato (ふるさと, Hometown) – 5:18
2. Wasurerannai (忘れらんない, I Won't Be Able to Forget) – 4:49
3. Furusato (Instrumental) (ふるさと (Instrumental)) – 5:16

=== 12 cm CD (Early Single Box and individual release) ===
1. Furusato (ふるさと) – 5:18
2. Wasurerannai (忘れらんない) – 4:50
3. Furusato (Instrumental) (ふるさと (Instrumental)) – 5:19
4. Furusato (Early Vocal Version) (ふるさと (Early Vocal Version)) – 5:29

== Members at the time of single ==
- 1st generation: Yuko Nakazawa, Aya Ishiguro, Kaori Iida, Natsumi Abe
- 2nd generation: Kei Yasuda, Mari Yaguchi, Sayaka Ichii

== Oricon rank and sales ==
Rank	Number sold
5	170,670
