= I Wish (Morning Musume song) =

2000 single by Morning Musume

Single by Morning Musume

from the album Best! Morning Musume 1
- Released: September 6, 2000 (JP)
- Recorded: 2000
- Genre: Japanese pop
- Length: 15:03
- Label: Zetima
- Songwriter: Tsunku
- Producer: Tsunku

Morning Musume singles chronology
"Happy Summer Wedding" (2000)	"I Wish" (2000)	"Ren'ai Revolution 21" (2000)

Music video
- "I Wish" on YouTube

"I Wish" is a song by J-pop idol group Morning Musume and was released September 6, 2000 as their tenth single. It sold a total of 654,640 copies. "I Wish" was the song used in Japanese commercials for the Sydney 2000 Olympic Games, which also featured the girls in the commercials. Lead vocals in the song are Ai Kago and Maki Goto. It was a number-one hit on the Oricon Charts in Japan.

== Track listing ==
All tracks are written by Tsunku.

No.	Title	Arrangement	Length
1.	"I Wish"	Shin Kono	4:46
2.	"Akogare My Boy" (あこがれ My Boy)	Akira	5:28
3.	"I Wish" (Instrumental)		4:46

== Members at the time of single ==
- 1st generation: Yuko Nakazawa, Kaori Iida, Natsumi Abe
- 2nd generation: Kei Yasuda, Mari Yaguchi
- 3rd generation: Maki Goto
- 4th generation: Rika Ishikawa, Hitomi Yoshizawa, Nozomi Tsuji, Ai Kago
