= Summer Night Town =

Single by Morning Musume

from the album First Time
- Released: May 27, 1998 (JP) August 31, 1998 (US)
- Recorded: 1998
- Length: 11:34 (8 cm CD)
- Label: Zetima
- Songwriter: Tsunku
- Producer: Tsunku

Morning Musume singles chronology
| "Morning Coffee" (1998) | "Summer Night Town" (1998) | "Daite Hold on Me!" (1998) |

Music video
- "Summer Night Town" on YouTube

"Summer Night Town" (サマーナイトタウン) is a song by J-pop idol group Morning Musume, released as their second single on May 27, 1998 as an 8 cm CD. It sold a total of 417,330 copies. In 2004 It was re-released as part of the Early Single Box and again in 2005 as a 12 cm CD. Lead vocals of this single was Natsumi Abe. This single was also the debut of the "Second Generation" Morning Musume members Mari Yaguchi, Kei Yasuda and Sayaka Ichii, as well as the group's first single to be released under Zetima and distributed through Sony Music Japan's sub label Epic Records, as One Up Music (Zetima's former name) had ended its distribution deal with Warner Music Japan and adopted its current name after the release of the group's previous single "Morning Coffee".

Distribution rights for Zetima's catalog would be given to Sony for this single, Morning Musume's first album "First Time" and all of the Up-Front Works label's subsequent releases.

== Track listing ==
All songs written by Tsunku.

=== 8 cm CD ===
1. Summer Night Town (サマーナイトタウン) – 3:49
2. A Memory of Summer '98 – 3:58
3. Summer Night Town (Instrumental) (サマーナイトタウン (Instrumental)) – 3:47

=== 12 cm CD (Early Single Box and individual release) ===
1. Summer Night Town (サマーナイトタウン)
2. A Memory of Summer '98
3. Summer Night Town (Instrumental) (サマーナイトタウン (Instrumental))
4. Summer Night Town (First Live Version) (サマーナイトタウン (First Live Version))

== Members at time of single ==
- 1st generation: Yuko Nakazawa, Aya Ishiguro, Kaori Iida, Natsumi Abe, Asuka Fukuda
- 2nd generation (debut): Kei Yasuda, Mari Yaguchi, Sayaka Ichii

== Oricon Rank and Sales ==
| Weekly Ranking | Sales |
|---|---|
| 4 | 417,330 |
