= Memory Seishun no Hikari =

Single by Morning Musume

from the album Second Morning
- Released: February 10, 1999 (JP)
- Recorded: 1999
- Genre: J-pop
- Length: 19:57 (8 cm CD); 25:30 (12 cm CD)
- Label: Zetima
- Songwriter(s): Tsunku Producer = Tsunku

Morning Musume singles chronology
"Daite Hold on Me!" (1998)	"Memory Seishun no Hikari" (1999)	"Manatsu no Kōsen" (1999)

Music video
- Memory Seishun no Hikari on YouTube

"Memory Seishun no Hikari" (Memory 青春の光, Memory: The light of youth) is the fourth single from the J-pop idol group Morning Musume, released on February 10, 1999 as an 8 cm CD. It sold a total of 410,850 copies, and reached number two on the Oricon Charts. In 2004, it was re-released as part of the Early Single Box and again in 2005 as a 12 cm CD. Lead vocals of this single were Natsumi Abe and Asuka Fukuda. Prior to this single's release, on January 17, 1999, Fukuda shocked viewers of the television show Asayan with her decision to "graduate" from Morning Musume and continue with her studies.

"Never Forget", one of the coupling tracks on the single, is often traditionally sung by band members at their graduation concerts and/or final TV appearances with the group, prior to embarking on solo careers or new groups.

== Track listing ==
All songs written by Tsunku.

=== 8 cm CD ===
1. "Memory Seishun no Hikari" (Memory 青春の光, "Memory: The Light of Youth") – 5:05
2. "Happy Night" – 5:13
3. "Never Forget" – 4:35
4. "Memory Seishun no Hikari (Instrumental)" – 5:04

=== 12 cm CD (Early Single Box and individual release) ===
1. "Memory Seishun no Hikari" – 5:05
2. "Happy Night" – 5:12
3. "Never Forget" – 4:37
4. "Memory Seishun no Hikari (Instrumental)" – 5:05
5. "Memory Seishun no Hikari (Instrumental)" – 5:10

== Members at the time of single ==
- 1st generation: Yuko Nakazawa, Aya Ishiguro, Kaori Iida, Natsumi Abe, Asuka Fukuda (last single)
- 2nd generation: Kei Yasuda, Mari Yaguchi, Sayaka Ichii
