= Happy Summer Wedding =

2000 single by Morning Musume

Single by Morning Musume

from the album Best! Morning Musume 1
- Released: May 17, 2000 (JP)
- Recorded: 2000
- Genre: Japanese Pop
- Length: 14:08
- Label: Zetima
- Songwriter(s): Tsunku
- Producer(s): Tsunku

Morning Musume singles chronology
"Koi no Dance Site" (2000)	"Happy Summer Wedding" (2000)	"I Wish" (2000)

Music video
- "Happy Summer Wedding" on YouTube

"Happy Summer Wedding" (ハッピーサマーウェディング, Happii Samaa Wedingu) is the ninth single of the J-pop idol group Morning Musume, released on May 17, 2000. It sold a total of 990,950 copies, becoming a number-one hit in Japan.

== History ==
This also marks the last single of Sayaka Ichii and the debut of the "Fourth Generation" Morning Musume members Rika Ishikawa, Hitomi Yoshizawa, Nozomi Tsuji and Ai Kago. This is their first 12 cm CD single.

== Track listing ==
1. "Happy Summer Wedding" (ハッピーサマーウェディング) – 4:50
2. "Tsūgaku Ressha" (通学列車, Commuter train) – 4:32
3. "Happy Summer Wedding (Instrumental)" (ハッピーサマーウェディング (Instrumental)) – 4:46

== Members at time of single ==
- 1st generation: Yuko Nakazawa, Kaori Iida, Natsumi Abe
- 2nd generation: Kei Yasuda, Mari Yaguchi, Sayaka Ichii (last single)
- 3rd generation: Maki Goto
- 4th generation (debut): Rika Ishikawa, Hitomi Yoshizawa, Nozomi Tsuji, Ai Kago
