= Daite Hold on Me! =

Single by Morning Musume

from the album Second Morning
- Released: September 9, 1998 (JP)
- Recorded: 1998
- Length: 12:55 (8 cm CD)
- Label: Zetima
- Songwriter: Tsunku
- Producer: Tsunku

Morning Musume singles chronology
"Summer Night Town" (1998)	"Daite Hold on Me!" (1998)	"Memory Seishun no Hikari" (1999)

Music video
- Daite Hold on Me! on YouTube

"Daite Hold on Me!" (抱いてHOLD ON ME!, Hold me Hold on Me!) is the third single of the J-pop idol group Morning Musume, released on September 9, 1998 as an 8 cm CD. It sold a total of 410,850 copies. In 2004 it was re-released as part of the Early Single Box and again in 2005 as a 12 cm CD. Lead vocals of this single were Natsumi Abe and Asuka Fukuda. It was Morning Musume's first single to reach the #1 position on the Oricon music charts.

== Track listing ==
All songs written by Tsunku.

=== 8 cm CD ===
1. Daite Hold on Me! (抱いてHOLD ON ME!) – 4:26
2. Tatoeba (例えば, For Example) – 4:07
3. Daite Hold on Me! (Instrumental) – 4:22

=== 12 cm CD (Early Single Box and individual release) ===
1. Daite Hold on Me! (抱いてHold on Me!)
2. Tatoeba (例えば, For Example)
3. Daite Hold on Me! (Instrumental)
4. Daite Hold on Me! (Morning Keiji Version) (Daite Hold on Me! (｢モーニング刑事｣ Version))

== Members at time of single ==
- 1st generation: Yuko Nakazawa, Aya Ishiguro, Kaori Iida, Natsumi Abe, Asuka Fukuda
- 2nd generation: Kei Yasuda, Mari Yaguchi, Sayaka Ichii

== Cover versions ==
- You Kikkawa covered the song on her 2012 cover album Vocalist?.
