= Zenbu! Petitmoni =

Zenbu! Pucchimoni

Studio album by Petitmoni
- Released: August 21, 2002 (JP)
- Recorded: 2002
- Studio: Yataboshi Studios
- Genre: Japanese pop
- Label: Zetima
- Producer: Tsunku

Zenbu! Petitmoni (ぜんぶ！プッチモニ, Zenbu! Pucchimoni) is the first album and only album of the subgroup Pucchimoni. It was released on August 21, 2002 selling a total of 109,160 copies, and placing at #1 on the Oricon Albums Chart.

== Track listing ==
The lyricist and composer of the songs is Tsunku.

1. "Chocotto Love" (ちょこっとLOVE)
2. "Seishun Jidai 1.2.3!" (青春時代1.2.3！)
3. "Baisekou Daisekou!" (バイセコー大成功！)
4. "Baby! Koi ni Knock Out!" (BABY！恋にKNOCK OUT！)
5. "Pittari Shitai X'mas!" (ぴったりしたいX'mas！)
6. "Makenai Maketakunai" (負けない 負けたくない)
7. "Dream & Kiss"
8. "Waltz! Ahiru ga Sanba" (ワルツ!アヒルが3羽)
9. "Yume no "Tsu.zu.ki"" (夢の「つ・づ・き」)
10. "The Petitmobics (Medley Version)" (ザ★プチモビクス (メドレーVersion))
11. "The Petitmobics 2 (Medley Version)" (ザ★プチモビクス2 (メドレーVersion))

== Members at the time of release ==
- Kei Yasuda
- Maki Goto
- Hitomi Yoshizawa
