= Ice Creamusume =

Taiwanese idol girl group

Ice Creamusume: アイスクリー娘。; 冰淇淋少女組。
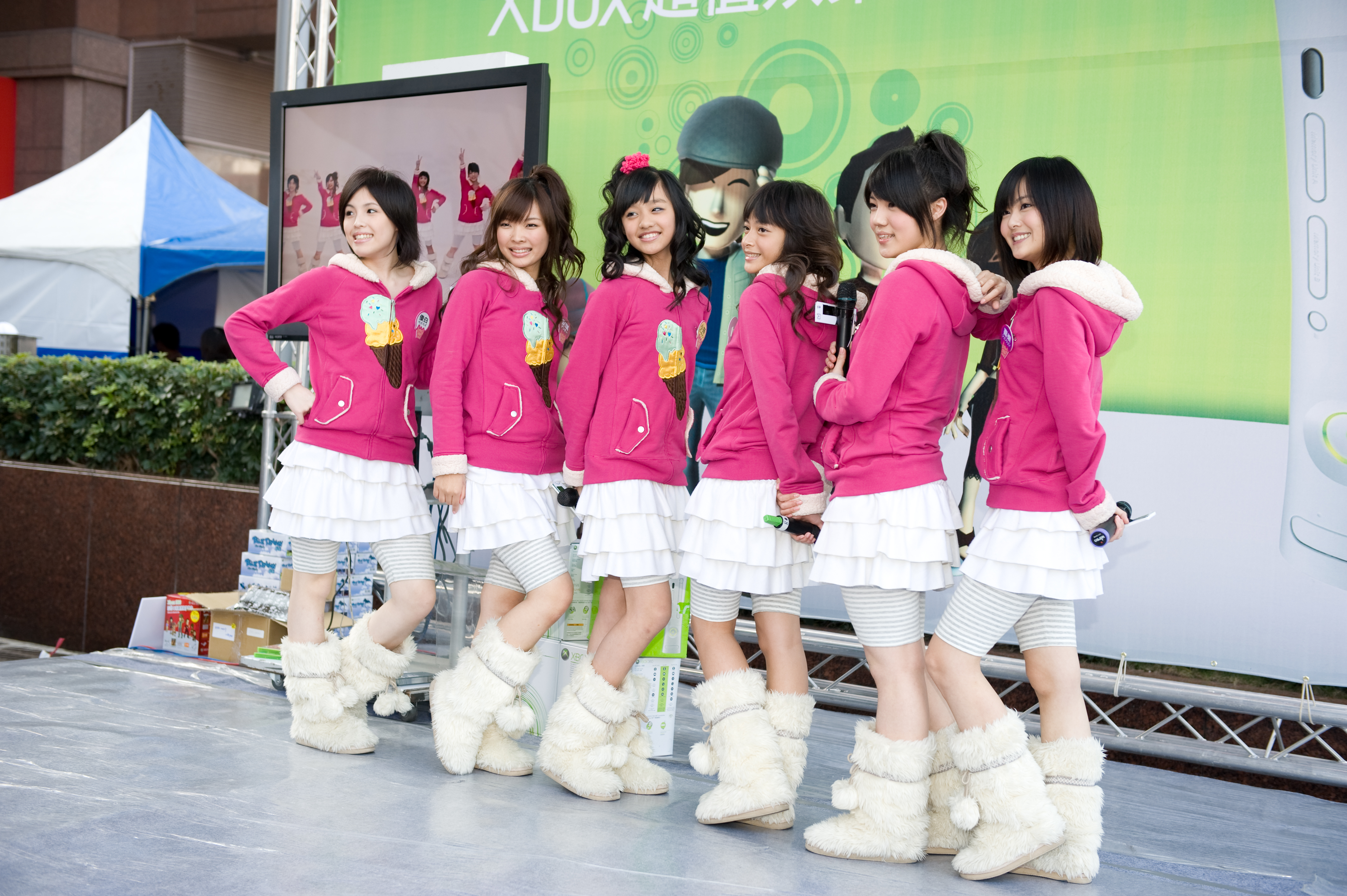
- Ice Creamusume in January 2009 (L to R): Tseng, Chung, Ku, Chiu, Chao, Wu

Background information
- Origin: Taiwan
- Genres: J-pop; Mandopop
- Years active: 2008–2010
- Label: Forward Music
- Spinoff of: Hello! Project; Morning Musume
- Past members: Wu Si-hsuan; Chung An-chi; Tseng Te-ping; Chao Kuo-jung; Chiu Tsui-ling; Ku Yun
- Website: Official website

Chinese name
- Chinese: 冰淇淋少女組
Transcriptions
Standard Mandarin
- Hanyu Pinyin: Bīngqílín Shàonǚ Zǔ
- Wade–Giles: Pingch'ilin Shaonü Tsu

Ice Creamusume (アイスクリー娘。, Aisu Kurīmusume; Chinese: 冰淇淋少女組。; pinyin: Bīngqílín Shàonǚ Zǔ; Wade–Giles: Pingch'ilin Shaonü Tsu) was an idol girl group based in Taiwan and associated with Hello! Project and signed under Forward Music. They were Hello! Project's first overseas group and the flagship band of Hello! Project Taiwan. The members consisted of Wu Si-hsuan ("Shen Shen"), Chung An-chi ("Anchī"), Tseng Te-ping ("Pei Pei"), Chao Kuo-jung ("Yōko"), Chiu Tsui-ling ("Rei Rei"), and Ku Yun ("Gū-chan"), with each member officially represented by an ice cream flavor. Since their debut, the group has released music in both Japanese and Chinese before disbanding in 2010.

== History ==
In 2007, Japanese idol group Hello! Project held the Hello! Project New Star Audition to recruit members for a new girl group based in Taiwan in an attempt to expand towards the Chinese market. The results were announced in September 2008, where six winners were selected. The winners were then taken to Japan for three months to undertake singing and dancing lessons as well as to record their first mini-album. The group was named Ice Creamusume, and they were set up as Hello! Project's first overseas group and Hello! Project Taiwan's flagship group.

The music video for "Love Debut", the first track on the album, was released in Taiwan on December 31, 2008. On January 9, 2009, Ice Creamusume released their first mini-album 1st Best! in Taiwan, while it was released in Japan on January 18. On January 31 and February 1, 2009, they made their Japanese debut at the Hello Pro Awards '09: Elder Club Graduation Commemoration Special concert, performing "Love Debut (Japanese Version)."

On February 4, 2009, a music video for their second mini-album title track, a cover version of "Love Revolution 21", was released. The music video for Ice Creamusume's third title track, "There Can't Be Love on a Planet Without Rain, Right?", was released in March 2009.

In spite of promotions, Ice Creamusume's sales performed below expectations and they failed to attract an audience. Ice Creamusume made their last appearance as a group in July 2009 at the Hello! Project Concert 2009 Summer: Hello! Champloo concert, performing "Love Debut (Japanese Version)" with Morning Musume's Jun Jun and Lin Lin filling in for Tseng and Ku. Afterwards, they became inactive for the rest of 2009 and their artist profile was removed from Hello! Project's website in 2010, signifying that they were no longer active under the label.

== Members ==
The members of the group are referred to by their full birthnames in Chinese media and by their official Japanese nicknames in Japanese media.

- Wu Si-hsuan (Chinese: 吳思璇) / Shen Shen (シェンシェン) - leader
- Chung An-chi (Chinese: 鍾安琪) / Anchī (アンチー) - sub-leader
- Tseng Te-ping (Chinese: 曾德萍) / Pei Pei (ペイペイ)
- Chao Kuo-jung (Chinese: 趙國蓉) / Yōko (ヨウコ)
- Chiu Tsui-ling (Chinese: 邱翠玲) / Rei Rei (レイレイ)
- Ku Yun (Chinese: 古筠) / Gū-chan (グーチャン)

== Discography ==
=== Extended plays ===
Title	Year	Details	Peak chart positions	Sales
Title	Year	Details	JPN	Sales
1st Best! (1st 最棒!) 1st Saikō! (1st最高!) (Japan)	2009	Released: January 9, 2009 (Taiwan), January 18, 2009 (Japan), July 7, 2009 (China); Label: Forward Music; Formats: CD; Track listing: 1. "戀愛登場 (Love Debut)"; 2. "早安咖啡 (Morning Coffee)"; 3. "在沒有雨水滋潤的星球上是無法付出愛的吧? (There Can't Be Love on a Planet Without Rain, Right?)"; 4. "戀愛革命21 (Love Revolution 21)"; 5. "Go Girl～戀愛勝利～ (Go Girl: Love Victory)"; 6. "Debut！～戀愛的轉角會有好運降臨～(日文版) (Love Debut) (Japanese version)" 7. "早安咖啡(日文版) (Morning Coffee) (Japanese version)"	—	—
