= Baby! Koi ni Knock Out! =

Single by Pucchimoni

from the album Zenbu! Pucchimoni
- Released: February 28, 2001 (JP)
- Recorded: 2001
- Genre: Japanese pop
- Label: Zetima
- Songwriter: Tsunku
- Producer: Tsunku

Pucchimoni singles chronology
"Seishun Jidai 1.2.3! / Baisekou Daiseikou!" (2000)	"Baby! Koi ni Knock Out!" (2001)	"Pittari Shitai X'mas!" (2001)

"Baby! Koi ni Knock Out!" (Baby! 恋にKnock Out!, Baby! Knock Out from Love) is the third single of the subgroup Pucchimoni. It was released on February 28, 2001 and sold 429,270 copies.

== Track listing ==
All songs are composed and written by Tsunku. "Baby! Koi ni Knock Out!" was arranged by Konishi Takao, "Waltz! Ahiru ga Sanba" was arranged by Takahashi Yuichi.

1. "Baby! Koi ni Knock Out!" (Baby! 恋にKnock Out!)
2. "Waltz! Ahiru ga Sanba" (ワルツ!アヒルが3羽)
3. "Baby! Koi ni Knock Out!" (Instrumental)

== Members ==
- Kei Yasuda (保田 圭)
- Maki Goto (後藤 真希)
- Hitomi Yoshizawa (吉澤 ひとみ)
