= Koi no Dance Site =

2000 single by Morning Musume

Single by Morning Musume

from the album 3rd-Love Paradise
- Released: January 26, 2000 (JP)
- Recorded: 2000
- Genre: J-pop; Indian pop
- Length: 14:02 (8 cm CD); 25:03 (LP)
- Label: Zetima
- Songwriter: Tsunku
- Producer: Tsunku

Morning Musume singles chronology
"Love Machine" (1999)	"Koi no Dance Site" (2000)	"Happy Summer Wedding" (2000)

Music video
- "Koi no Dance Site" on YouTube

"Koi no Dance Site" (恋のダンスサイト, Koi no Dansu Saito; Dance site of love) is the eighth single of the J-pop idol group Morning Musume, released on January 26, 2000 as an 8 cm CD. It sold a total of 1,229,970 copies making it their second highest selling single and a number-two hit on the Oricon Charts. In 2004, it was re-released as part of the Early Single Box and again in 2005 as a 12 cm CD. The song also makes an appearance in the Japanese Nintendo DS game Osu! Tatakae! Ouendan.

"Koi no Dance Site" is the source of "Sexy Beam", which became a catchphrase for Mari Yaguchi and went on to be referenced in anime and games such as Silent Hill.

It is the only Morning Musume single to date to feature group members contributing to the instrumental backing track, as several of the members can be heard blowing police whistles during the song's choruses and closing moments.

== Packaging ==
The original 8 cm CD release was housed in a J-card-type 12 cm slimline single case instead of the then-industry CD snap-pack packaging. The case itself was 7 mm thick, showing the artwork through the front, as well as through the spine and part of the back of the case. The CD itself was inserted upside down, allowing the artwork of the disc itself to show through the transparent back of the case. This is one of only two 8 cm CD singles released by Morning Musume to adhere this packaging (the other being their seventh single Love Machine (1999)).

== Track listing ==
=== 8 cm CD ===
1. Koi no Dance Site (恋のダンスサイト, Dance site of love) – 4:29
2. Koi wa Rock 'n' Roll (恋はロケンロー, Love is rock 'n' roll) – 5:08
3. Koi no Dance Site (Instrumental) (恋のダンスサイト (Instrumental)) – 4:25

=== LP ===
1. Koi no Dance Site (Original) (恋のダンスサイト (Original)) – 4:29
2. Koi no Dance Site (Groove That Soul Remix) (恋のダンスサイト (Groove That Soul Remix)) – 8:07
3. Koi no Dance Site (M.I.D KH-R Club Mix) (恋のダンスサイト (M.I.D KH-R Club Mix)) – 5:38
4. Koi no Dance Site (Pandart Sasanoooha Remix) (恋のダンスサイト (Pandart Sasanoooha Remix)) – 6:49

=== 12 cm CD (Early Single Box and individual release) ===
1. Koi no Dance Site (恋のダンスサイト)
2. Koi wa Rock 'n' Roll (恋はロケンロー)
3. Koi no Dance Site (Instrumental) (恋のダンスサイト (Instrumental))
4. Koi no Dance Site (Groove That Soul Remix) (恋のダンスサイト(Groove That Soul Remix))
5. Koi no Dance Site (M.I.D. KH-R Club Mix) (恋のダンスサイト (M.I.D. KH-R Club Mix))

== Members at time of single ==
- 1st generation: Yuko Nakazawa, Kaori Iida, Natsumi Abe
- 2nd generation: Kei Yasuda, Mari Yaguchi, Sayaka Ichii
- 3rd generation: Maki Goto
