= Seishun Jidai 1. 2. 3!/Baisekō Daiseikō! =

2000 single by Petitmoni

Single by Petitmoni

from the album Zenbu! Petitmoni
- Released: July 26, 2000 (JP)
- Recorded: 2000
- Genre: J-pop
- Length: 19:49
- Label: Zetima
- Songwriter: Tsunku (both songs)
- Producer: Tsunku

Petitmoni singles chronology
"Chocotto Love" (1999)	"Seishun Jidai 1. 2. 3!/Baisekō Daiseikō!" (2000)	"Baby! Koi ni Knock Out!" (2001)

"Seishun Jidai 1. 2. 3!/Baisekō Daiseikō!" (青春時代1. 2. 3!／バイセコー大成功!; "Age of Youth 1. 2. 3!/Bicycle Big Success!") is the second single of the subgroup Petitmoni. It was released on July 26, 2000 and sold 484,160 copies. It went to number one on the Oricon Charts in Japan.

In 2002, an English-language cover ("Our Youth 1.2.3!") was recorded by Irene Cara for the album Cover Morning Musume Hello! Project!.

== Track listing ==
1. "Seishun Jidai 1. 2. 3!" (青春時代1.2.3!)
  - Lyrics and composition by Tsunku; Arrangement by Maejima Yasuaki
2. "Baisekō Daiseikō!" (バイセコー大成功!)
  - Lyrics and composition by Tsunku; Arrangement by Konishi Takao
3. "Seishun Jidai 1. 2. 3! (Instrumental)"
4. "Baisekō Daiseikō! (Instrumental)"

== Featured lineup ==
- Kei Yasuda
- Maki Goto
- Hitomi Yoshizawa
