= Chocotto Love =

"Chokotto Love"

Single by Petitmoni

from the album Zenbu! Petitmoni
- Released: November 25, 1999 (JP)
- Recorded: 1999
- Genre: J-pop
- Label: Zetima
- Songwriter: Tsunku
- Producer: Tsunku

Petitmoni singles chronology
"Chokotto Love" (1999)	"Seishun Jidai 1.2.3! / Baisekou Daiseikou!" (2000)

"Chokotto Love" (ちょこっとLove, A Little Bit of Love) is the first single of the subgroup Petitmoni. It was released on November 25, 1999 and sold 1,123,610 copies, peaking at number one on the Oricon charts in Japan.

It was later covered by bubblegum dance group Smile.dk as "Petit Love"; This cover was featured on their remix album, SMiLE Paradise.

In 2013, Yuimetal of the kawaii metal group Babymetal performed a cover during their Legend 1999 show at NHK Hall. The song was chosen because it was a hit in 1999, the year of her and fellow member Moametal's birth.

== Track listing ==
1. "Chokotto Love" (ちょこっとLove)
  - Lyrics and composition by Tsunku; Arrangement by Ken Matsubara
2. "Dream & Kiss"
  - Lyrics and composition by Tsunku; Arrangement by Takao Konishi
3. "Chokotto Love (Instrumental)"

== Featured lineup ==
- Sayaka Ichii
- Kei Yasuda
- Maki Goto
