= Pittari Shitai X'mas! =

"Pittari Shitai X'Mas!"

Single by Petitmoni

from the album Zenbu! Pucchimoni
- Released: November 14, 2001 (JP)
- Recorded: 2001
- Genre: J-pop
- Length: 11:29
- Label: Zetima
- Songwriter: Tsunku
- Producer: Tsunku

Petitmoni singles chronology
"Baby! Koi ni Knock Out!" (2001)	"Pittari Shitai X'Mas!" (2001)

"Pittari Shitai X'mas!" (ぴったりしたいX'mas!; "I Want a Perfect Christmas!") is the fourth and last single released by the subgroup Petitmoni. It was released on November 14, 2001, and sold 300,320 copies. It peaked at number two on the Oricon Charts.

== Track listing ==
All songs are composed and written by Tsunku.

1. "Pittari Shitai X'mas!" (ぴったりしたいX'mas!; "I Want a Perfect Christmas!")
2. "Yume no "Tsu.zu.ki"" (夢の「つ・づ・き」)
3. "Pittari Shitai X'mas! (Instrumental)"

== Members at the time of single ==
- Kei Yasuda
- Maki Goto
- Hitomi Yoshizawa
