= Aegekai ni Dakarete =

Single by Kaori Iida

from the album Avenir: Mirai
- Released: February 4, 2004 (JP)
- Recorded: 2004
- Genre: J-pop
- Label: Chichūkai
- Songwriters: Yoshiko Miura, Tsunku,
- Producer: Tsunku

Kaori Iida singles chronology
"Aegekai ni Dakarete" (2004)	"Door no Mukō de Bell ga Natteta" (2004)

"Aegekai ni Dakerete" (エーゲ海に抱かれて) is the first single of Hello! Project solo artist, Kaori Iida. It was released on February 4, 2004, when she was still a member of the idol group, Morning Musume.

== Track listing ==
1. "Aegekai ni Dakerete" (エーゲ海に抱かれて)
  - Lyrics by Yoshiko Miura, composition by Tsunku, arrangement by Chijou Maeno
2. "Saigo no Seppun" (最後の接吻)
  - Lyrics and composition by Tsunku, arrangement by Chijou Maeno
3. "Aegekai ni Dakerete (Instrumental)"

== Performances ==
=== Television ===
- Hello! Morning (February 1, 2004)
- AX MUSIC-TV (February 6, 2004)
- Pop Jam (February 7, 2004)

=== Concerts ===
Concert title	Release
Hello! Project 2004 Winter: C'mon! Dance World (Hello!Project 2004 Winter: C’mon！ダンスワールド)	March 17, 2004
Morning Musume Concert Tour 2004 Haru The Best of Japan (モーニング娘。CONCERT TOUR2004春 The Best of Japan)	July 14, 2004

== Charts ==
Chart	Peak rank	Chart run
Oricon Weekly Singles Chart	#17	3 weeks
