= Second Morning =

Studio album by Morning Musume
- Released: July 28, 1999
- Recorded: 1998–1999
- Genre: J-pop; house; dance-pop
- Length: 56:23
- Label: Zetima
- Producer: Tsunku

Morning Musume chronology
First Time (1998)	Second Morning (1999)	3rd-Love Paradise (2000)

Singles from Second Morning
- 1. "Daite Hold on Me!" Released: September 8, 1998; 2. "Memory Seishun no Hikari" Released: February 10, 1999; 3. "Manatsu no Kōsen" Released: May 12, 1999; 4. "Furusato" Released: July 13, 1999

Second Morning (セカンドモーニング) is the second album from the J-pop idol group Morning Musume. It was released on July 28, 1999, and sold a total of 428,990 copies.

== Overview ==
It was released both on CD with the catalogue number EPCE-5025 and MiniDisc with the catalogue number EPYE-5025. It includes Morning Musume's first #1 single, Daite Hold on Me!.

The first pressing of Second Morning comes in special packaging with a trading booklet. 7 types of booklets were released in total, each identified by a unique color and containing slightly different photos. The colors are red, orange, yellow, green, light blue, blue and purple.

Because Asuka Fukuda graduated from Morning Musume before this album came out, she does not appear on the album's cover artwork. However, her vocals are still heard on tracks 3, 6 and 11.

== Track listing ==
No.	Title	Length
1.	"Night of Tokyo City"	4:11
2.	"Manatsu no Kōsen (Vacation Mix) (真夏の光線 (Vacation Mix), A Ray of Light in Midsummer)"	5:06
3.	"Memory Seishun no Hikari (Memory 青春の光, Memory: The Light of Youth)"	5:05
4.	"Suki de x5 (好きで×5, I Love You ×5)"	4:37
5.	"Furusato (ふるさと, Hometown)"	5:18
6.	"Daite Hold on Me! (N.Y.Mix) (抱いてHold on Me! (N.Y.Mix), Hold Me, Hold On Me!)"	4:23
7.	"Papa ni Niteiru Kare (パパに似ている彼, He Who Looks Like Dad)"	4:42
8.	"Senkō Hanabi (せんこう花火, Toy Fireworks)"	4:33
9.	"Koi no Shihatsu Ressha (Album Version) (恋の始発列車 (Album Version), Love's First Train)"	4:26
10.	"Otome no Shinrigaku (乙女の心理学, A Girl's Psychology)"	3:34
11.	"Never Forget (Large Vocal Mix)"	4:32
12.	"Da Di Du De Do Da Di! (ダディドゥデドダディ!)"	5:56
