= Shining Butterfly =

- Regular Edition cover

Single by Dream Morning Musume
- B-side: "Aozora ga Itsumademo Tsuzuku Yō na Mirai de Are! (2012 Dorimusu Ver.)"
- Released: February 15, 2012 (Japan)
- Genre: Pop
- Label: Zetima
- Songwriter: Tsunku
- Producer: Tsunku

Music video
- Shining Butterfly on YouTube

Alternative cover
- Limited Edition cover

"Shining Butterfly" (シャイニング バタフライ) is the first single by the Japanese female pop group Dream Morning Musume, released in Japan on February 15, 2012 on the Zetima label.

== Background ==
As is usual for Hello! Project releases, all songs on the single are composed and written entirely by Tsunku. The first track is arranged by Shōichirō Hirata, and the second by Kaoru Ōkubo, which was exactly the same for the last two Morning Musume singles, "Only You" and "Kono Chikyū no Heiwa o Honki de Negatterun Da yo! / Kare to Issho ni Omise ga Shitai!" (except the Ai Takahashi Graduation Commemoration Edition).

The A-side is completely new, while the coupling track is a newly arranged re-recording of a song that previously appeared on the album Rainbow 7 by Morning Musume.

Also, this new title track is the theme song for an upcoming movie titled Atsushi Hime Number 1. It is the first movie produced by Tsunku, and it stars the Dream Morning Musume member Rika Ishikawa.

== Recording ==
Miki Fujimoto, who was on maternity leave from the group, still participated in recording the songs and in making the music video.

== Music video ==
The music video tells a story which centers around Rika Ishikawa. She is at the bar thinking about her lover, when he suddenly comes in with two other women.

The video also features a cameo appearance by Ai Takahashi, who participated in recording the single as well. She is not a member of the group and just recently, in September 2011, graduated from Morning Musume.

== Release ==
The single was released in two versions: a regular CD-only edition (catalog number EPCE-5848) and a CD+DVD limited edition (catalog number EPCE-5846/7). The bonus DVD contained the main version of the music video, which is not common for Hello! Project releases. Usually, the limited edition comes with a dance version, and one needs to buy the corresponding DVD single to get the main TV version of the video.

== Chart performance ==
The single debuted at number 7 in the Oricon daily sales ranking for February 14 (Musical releases in Japan arrive at stores one day before the specified release date.) In its first week, "Shining Butterfly" placed 12th in the Oricon Weekly Singles Chart.

== Track listing ==
All songs written and composed by Tsunku.
"Shining Butterfly" arranged by Shōichirō Hirata.
"Aozora ga Itsumademo Tsuzuku Yō na Mirai de Are! (2012 Dorimusu Ver.)" arranged by Kaoru Ōkubo.

CD
No.	Title	Length
1.	"Shining Butterfly" (シャイニング バタフライ)
2.	"Aozora ga Itsumademo Tsuzuku Yō na Mirai de Are! (2012 Dorimusu Ver.)" (青空がいつまでも続くような未来であれ!（2012ドリムス。Ver.）)
3.	"Shining Butterfly (Instrumental)" (3.シャイニング バタフライ（Instrumental）)

Limited DVD
No.	Title	Length
1.	"Shining Butterfly (Music Video)" (1.シャイニング バタフライ（Music Video）)

== Bonus ==
Sealed into the first press of the Regular Edition:

- Gift application postcard

== Charts ==
Chart (2012)	Peak position	Sales	
Chart (2012)	Peak position	First week/ month	Total
Oricon Daily Singles Chart	7		
Oricon Weekly Singles Chart	12	7039	
Oricon Monthly Singles Chart	44	9322	
Billboard Japan Hot 100	33		
Billboard Japan Hot Singles Sales	11		
Billboard Japan Hot Top Airplay	60		
Billboard Japan Adult Contemporary Airplay	53		
