= Avenir: Mirai =

Studio album by Kaori Iida
- Released: December 29, 2004
- Recorded: 2004
- Genres: Japanese pop, Euro-enka
- Length: 55:19
- Label: Chichūkai Label
- Producer: Tsunku

Kaori Iida chronology
Paradinome: Koi ni Mi o Yudanete (2003)	Avenir: Mirai (2004)	Plein D'amour: Ai ga Ippai (2005)

Avenir: Mirai (アヴニール ～未来～) is the third studio album of Hello! Project soloist Kaori Iida and is her first album in Japanese. Concurrently, it was her last album that was released when she was still a member of the idol group Morning Musume. It was released on December 29, 2004 with catalog number EPCE-2030.

The album's first pressing included Hello! Project photo card #94.

== Track listing ==
1. "Miraizu" (未来図)
  - Lyrics: Junko Sadou
  - Composer: Rie
  - Arranger: Chijou Maeno
2. "Aruite Yukou... Mirai he" (歩いてゆこう…未来へ)
  - Lyrics: Kaori Iida
  - Composer: Kazunori Ashizawa
  - Arranger: Chijou Maeno
3. "Door no Mukō de Bell ga Natteta" (ドアの向こうでBellが鳴ってた)
  - Lyrics: Yoshiko Miura
  - Composer: Tsunku
  - Arranger: Kouji Makaino
4. "Jounetsu no Tobira" (情熱のトビラ)
  - Lyrics: Natsumi Watanabe
  - Composer: Kazunori Ashizawa
  - Arranger: Chijou Maeno
5. "Shinjugai" (真珠貝)
  - Lyrics: Natsumi Watanabe
  - Composer: Ichiro Kaneda
  - Arranger: Chijou Maeno
6. "Watashi no Naka ni Ite" (私の中にいて)
  - Lyrics:
  - Composer: Hitoshi Haba
7. "Senritsu" (旋律)
  - Lyrics: Yuho Iwasato
  - Composer: Taisei
  - Arranger: Chijou Maeno
8. "Aegekai ni Dakarete" (エーゲ海に抱かれて)
  - Lyrics: Yoshiko Miura
  - Composer: Tsunku
  - Arranger: Chijou Maeno
9. "Sekai de Ichiban Kirei na Hoshizora" (世界で一番きれいな星空)
  - Lyrics: Yuho Iwasato
  - Composer: Kiyonori Matsuo
  - Arranger: Chijou Maeno
10. "Mafuyu no Rondo" (真冬の輪舞曲)
  - Lyrics: Junko Sadou
  - Composer: Kazunori Ashizawa
  - Arranger: Chijou Maeno
11. "Sayonara Made ni Shitai 10 no Koto" (さよならまでにしたい10のこと)
  - Lyrics: Yuho Iwasato
  - Composer: Hitoshi Haba
  - Arranger: Chijou Maeno
12. "Arifureta Kiseki" (ありふれた奇跡)
  - Lyrics: Junko Sadou
  - Composer: Akira Inaba (composer)
  - Arranger: Chijou Maeno
