= Paradinome: Koi ni Mi o Yudanete =

Studio album by Kaori Iida
- Released: October 22, 2003
- Recorded: 2003
- Genre: Classic
- Length: 32:38
- Label: Chichūkai Label
- Producer: Tsunku

Kaori Iida chronology
Osavurio: Ai wa Matte Kurenai (2003)	Paradinome: Koi ni Mi o Yudanete (2003)	Avenir: Mirai (2004)

Paradinome: Koi ni Mi o Yudanete (パラディノメ ～恋に身をゆだねて～) is Kaori Iida's second studio album as a solo artist of Hello! Project, and her second album covering songs in European languages. It was released on October 22, 2003, when she was still a member of the idol group, Morning Musume.

== Track listing ==
1. Paradinome: Koi ni Mi wo Yudanete (パラディノメ: 恋に身をゆだねて) originally Παραδινομαι (Paradinome) by Haris Alexiou
2. Lila no Kisetsu (リラの季節) originally Un jour, un enfant by Frida Boccara
3. Aux Champs-Élysées (オー・シャンゼリゼ) originally Les Champs Élysées by Joe Dassin
4. Aa, Jinsei (ああ、人生) originally Αχ! η ζωή (Ah! i zoi) by Konstantina
5. Marine Blue no Hitomi (マリン・ブルーの瞳) originally Pull Marine by Isabelle Adjani
6. Sora (空) originally Cielo by Little Peggy March
7. Suna ni Kieta Namida (砂に消えた涙) originally Un Buco Nella Sabbia by Mina
8. Wasuresarareta Michi (忘れ去られた道) originally Δρόμοι λησμονημένοι (Dromi Lismonimeni) by Haris Alexiou
9. Yumemiru Omoi (夢見る想い) originally Non ho l'età per amarti by Gigliola Cinquetti
10. Jasmine (ジャスミン) originally To Giasemi, a traditional Cypriot song
