= Dance Man =

Japanese musician (born 1963)

- ダンス☆マン
- Born: Hideki Fujisawa; October 12, 1963 (age 62)
- Education: Dokkyou University (dropped out)
- Occupation: Musician

Hideki Fujisawa (藤沢 秀樹, Fujisawa Hideki) (born October 12, 1963) is a Japanese musician, better known by the stage name Dance Man (ダンス☆マン, Dansu Man). Dance☆Man calls himself an alien from "Mirror Ball Planet". He is always seen wearing a huge afro wig and sideburns, matched with sunglasses. He is very secretive about his identity to the public, and does not release any personal information in his CDs or his official website.

Fujisawa is currently signed to independent record label In Da Groove, distributed by Nippon Columbia.

== Career ==
Fujisawa went to Dokkyou University, a private college in Saitama prefecture, majoring in economics but eventually dropped out before he could graduate. During his stay in the university, he joined a band called JADOES. The band became official in 1986, when Kadomatsu Toshiki became their record producer. The band's drummer, Yukio Shimamura, did some roadshows with band Casiopea, inspiring Fujisawa to do some roadshows himself.

He started his own career in 1998, calling himself as a space alien from "Planet Mirrorball". He re-arranged famous American/British dance songs from the 70's and 80's, often replacing the lyrics with humorous lines. One of them was Carl Carlton's song "She's a Bad Mama Jama (She's Built, She's Stacked)" He made his own cover version of the song, renamed it to "Se no Takai Yatsu wa Jama", and released it on March 18 under Avex Trax.

In 1999, he began a career in arranging and re-arranging songs written by Japanese composers. He started his career as an arranger to Morning Musume's 7th single, "Love Machine." The single was a success and his name became known in the music industry.

When the millennium came, Fujisawa again arranged another song for the group Morning Musume. "Koi no Dance Site" was the group's 8th single and won an award from 42nd Japanese Japan Record Grand Prix, along with Hiromi Gō's "Nakatta Koto ni Shite." On the same year, Hiromi Gō invited Fujisawa as a guest in his performance at Kōhaku Uta Gassen.

He continued performing and recording songs with a band he called The Bandman, consisted of 8 musicians and back-up vocalists. He is currently working with Konami, writing and arranging songs for the popular video game Beatmania.

His single "Afro Gunsō" became the first ending theme of the anime series Sgt. Frog. He also appeared on the show as a fictional version of himself.

== Artists Dance Man worked with ==
- Morning Musume (モーニング娘。)
- "Disっ娘"(Diskko) (includes members of BeForU)
- Spark
- Last Angel (ラスト☆エンジェル)
- Atomic Kitten
- Sharan Q (シャ乱Q)
- Arisa Mizuki (観月ありさ)
- Kiiya Kiss (キーヤキッス)
- Hiromi Gō (郷ひろみ)
- Seiko Matsuda (松田聖子)
- Hiroko Anzai (安西ひろこ)
- Steps (ステップス)
- Happa Tai (はっぱ隊)
- Nona Reeves
- PaniCrew
- Shonentai (少年隊)
- Kuinupana (クイヌパナ)
- Nanase Aikawa (相川七瀬)
- Kaci Battaglia
- Minihamuzu (ミニハムず)
- Dandy Sakano (ダンディ坂野)
- KinKi Kids
- Junpei Shiina (椎名純平)
- Run&Gun
- Naohito Fujiki (藤木直人)
- More Peach Summer Snow

== Discography ==
=== Albums ===
#	Title	Release date
1	Mirrorballism ~New Generation Dance Classics~	June 24, 1998
2	Mirrorballism 2 ~New Generation Dance Classics~	July 14, 1999
3	Mirrorballism 3 ~New Generation Dance Classics~	November 15, 2000
4	Mirrorballism 4 ~New Generation Dance Classics~	February 27, 2002
5	Greatest Hits	June 19, 2002
6	Funcoverlic	April 14, 2004
7	Funk Love	March 19, 2008
8	Dance☆Man Returns (ダンス☆マン リターンズ)	July 11, 2007
9	Dance☆Man respects Keroro Gunso (ダンス☆マン respects ケロロ軍曹)	February 25, 2009
10	ディスコ戦隊 アフレンジャー	July 21, 2010

=== Singles ===
#	Title	Release date
1	"Se no Takai Yatsu wa Jama" (背の高いやつはジャマ)	March 18, 1998
2	"Wan Box no Oonaa/Dansubu Buchou Nan Bara" (ワンBOXのオーナー／ダンス部 部長南原)	November 18, 1998
3	"Hen na Adana wa Iya" (ヘンなあだ名はイヤ)	May 26, 1999
4	"Seppun no Teema" (接吻のテーマ)	April 26, 2000
5	""Doomu 3 Kobun" tte Dono Kurai?" ("ドーム3コ分"ってどのくらい?)	July 5, 2000
6	"Kanji Yomeru Kedo Kakenai" (漢字読めるけど書けない)	October 18, 2000
7	"Koi to Ai no Tengoku" (恋と愛の天国)	December 20, 2000
8	"Jazz Soul Funk"	June 6, 2001
9	"La★Booo"	October 3, 2001
10	"Shouri V Zettai Tsukamou!" (勝利 V 絶対つかもう!)	January 30, 2002
11	"Afro Gunsou" (アフロ軍曹)	May 8, 2004
12	"Giftful Christmas"	December 8, 2010

=== DVD ===
- 2001-03-07 – Mirrorballismovie
