= Early Single Box =

Box set by Morning Musume
- Released: December 15, 2004
- Recorded: 1997–2000
- Genre: Japanese pop
- Length: 3:54:21
- Label: Zetima
- Producer: Tsunku

Morning Musume chronology
Ai no Dai 6 Kan (2004)	Early Single Box (2004)	Rainbow 7 (2005)

Early Single Box is the first box set compilation from J-pop idol group Morning Musume, and was released December 15, 2004. It contains their first eight singles in their entirety, each on a separate disc with an additional bonus track each. It also includes a ninth disc with fifteen instrumentals of some songs from their first three albums.

Although the original versions of the first six singles were pressed on 8 cm CDs, all of the ones included in the Early Single Box were 12 cm CDs.

All eight of the new versions of the singles were later reissued separately. The instrumental album is still exclusive to the box set.

== Track listing ==
=== 1st single: Morning Coffee ===
1. "Morning Coffee"
2. "Ai no Tane"
3. "Morning Coffee" (Instrumental)
4. "Morning Coffee" (Unreleased B♭ Version)

=== 2nd single: Summer Night Town ===
1. "Summer Night Town"
2. "A Memory of Summer '98"
3. "Summer Night Town" (Instrumental Version)
4. "Summer Night Town" (First Live Version)

=== 3rd single: Daite Hold on Me! ===
1. "Daite Hold on Me!"
2. "Tatoeba"
3. "Daite Hold on Me!" (Instrumental)
4. "Daite Hold on Me!" (Morning Keiji Version)

=== 4th single: Memory Seishun no Hikari ===
1. "Memory Seishun no Hikari"
2. "Happy Night"
3. "Never Forget"
4. "Memory Seishun no Hikari" (Instrumental)
5. "Memory Seishun no Hikari" (1999-04-19 Live Version)

=== 5th single: Manatsu no Kōsen ===
1. "Manatsu no Kōsen"
2. "Koi no Shihatsu Ressha"
3. "Manatsu no Kōsen" (Instrumental)
4. "Manatsu no Kōsen" (Early Version)

=== 6th single: Furusato ===
1. "Furusato"
2. "Wasurerannai"
3. "Furusato" (Instrumental)
4. "Furusato" (Early Vocal Version)

=== 7th single: Love Machine ===
1. "Love Machine"
2. "21seiki"
3. "Love Machine" (Instrumental)
4. "Love Machine" (Early Unision Version)

=== 8th single: Koi no Dance Site ===
1. "Koi no Dance Site"
2. "Koi wa Rock n' Roll"
3. "Koi no Dance Site" (Instrumental)
4. "Koi no Dance Site" (Groove That Soul Remix)
5. "Koi no Dance Site" (M.I.D. KH-R CLUB MIX)

=== Bonus Karaoke Disc ===
1. "Ai no Tane"
2. "Good Morning"
3. "Dō ni ka Shite Doyōbi"
4. "Mirai no Tobira"
5. "Usotsuki Anta"
6. "Happy Night"
7. "Never Forget"
8. "Suki de x5"
9. "Papa ni Niteiru Kare"
10. "Senkō Hanabi"
11. "Da Di Du De Do Da Di!"
12. "Aisha Loan de"
13. "Kuchizuke no Sono Ato"
14. "Dance Suru no da!"
15. "Harajuku 6:00 Shūgō"
