= Door no Mukō de Bell ga Natteta =

Single by Kaori Iida

from the album Avenir: Mirai
- Released: July 28, 2004 (JP)
- Recorded: 2004
- Genre: J-pop
- Label: Chichūkai
- Songwriters: Yoshiko Miura, Tsunku,
- Producer: Tsunku

Kaori Iida singles chronology
"Aegekai ni Dakarete" (2004)	"Door no Mukō de Bell ga Natteta" (2004)

"Door no Mukō de Bell ga Natteta" (ドアの向こうでBellが鳴ってた) is the second single of Hello! Project solo artist, Kaori Iida. It was released on July 28, 2004. Like her first single, it was released when she was still a member of the idol group, Morning Musume.

== Track listing ==
1. "Door no Mukō de Bell ga Natteta" (ドアの向こうでBellが鳴ってた)
  - Lyrics by Yoshiko Miura, composition by Tsunku, arrangement by Kouji Makaino
2. "Nakazu ni Irarenai Watashi Desu" (泣かずにいられない私です)
  - Lyrics by Yoshiko Miura, composition by Tsunku, arrangement by Kouji Makaino
3. Door no Mukō de Bell ga Natteta (Instrumental)

== Charts ==
Weekly rank	Sales
33	6,422
