= Plein d'amour: Ai ga Ippai =

Plein D'amour: Ai ga Ippai

Studio album by Kaori Iida
- Released: December 21, 2005
- Recorded: 2005
- Genre: Enka, European classical music, Japanese pop
- Length: 51:13
- Language: French, Japanese
- Label: Chichūkai Label
- Producer: Tsunku

Kaori Iida chronology
Avenir: Mirai (2004)	Plein D'amour: Ai ga Ippai (2005)

Professional ratings
Review scores
Source	Rating
Ikimasshoi	Archived May 16, 2006, at the Wayback Machine

Plein D'amour: Ai ga Ippai (プラン・ダムール～愛がいっぱい～) is the fourth studio album of Hello! Project member Kaori Iida; it is also her first solo album that was released after her graduation from the girl group Morning Musume. Unlike her first three albums, it contains songs of both Japanese and European languages. It was released on December 21, 2005, with the catalog number EPCE-2031.

== Track listing ==
1. Bloom
2. Sakura no Hana ga Saku Koro (桜の花が咲く頃, When the Cherry Blossom Blooms)
3. Onaji Basho de (同じ場所で)
4. Souvenir: Souvenir (Souvenir ～スーヴェニール～)
5. Irresistiblement: Anata no Toriko (Irresistiblement: あなたのとりこ, Irresistiblement: Your Prisoner)
6. La Notte Dell'addio: Wakare no Yoru (La Notte Dell'addio: 別れの夜, La Notte Dell'addio: The Night of Our Separation)
7. Eureka no Kaze (ユリーカの風, The Wind of Discovery)
8. Hirahira to (ひらひらと)
9. Mirai Yohou (未来予報)
10. Ai no Kotoba (愛のコトバ)
11. Mikka Okure no Christmas Card (3日おくれのChristmas Card)
12. Papillon
