= Osavurio: Ai wa Matte Kurenai =

Studio album by Kaori Iida
- Released: April 23, 2003
- Recorded: 2003
- Genre: European classical music
- Length: 30:26
- Language: French, Greek, Italian
- Label: Chichūkai Label
- Producer: Tsunku

Kaori Iida chronology
Osavurio: Ai wa Matte Kurenai (2003)	Paradinome: Koi ni Mi o Yudanete (2003)

Osavurio: Ai wa Matte Kurenai (オサヴリオ ～愛は待ってくれない～) is Kaori Iida's first studio album as a solo artist of Hello! Project and her first album covering songs in European languages. It contains her own rendition of popular European classical songs, such as "La Vie en Rose" and "Garota de Ipanema." It was released on April 23, 2003, when she was still a member of the idol group, Morning Musume.

== Track listing ==
1. Ehe Ya: Sayōnara (エヘ ヤ: さようなら)
2. Osavurio: Ai wa Matte Kurenai (オサヴリオ: 愛は待ってくれない)
3. Cherbourg no Amagasa (シェルブールの雨傘)
4. Barairo no Jinsei (バラ色の人生)
5. Ipanema no Musume (イパネマの娘)
6. Downtown (ダウン・タウン)
7. Otome no Namida (乙女の涙)
8. Amore Scusami (アモーレ・スクーザミ)
9. Suteki na Ōjisama (素敵な王子様)
10. Muzōsa Shinshi (無造作紳士)

== Song details ==
All songs are arranged by Tomotsune Maeno.

=== French songs ===
Cherbourg no Amagasa is best known as "Les Parapluies de Cherbourg" named after the famous musical of the same name. It was originally released on 1964 by Danielle Licari.

- Lyrics: Jacques Demy
- Composer: Michel Legrand

Barairo no Jinsei is famously known as "La Vie en Rose" and is known as the signature song of Édith Piaf. It was originally released on 1946.

- Lyrics: Edith Piaf
- Composer: Louiguy
- Duration: 3:58

Ipanema no Musume is famously known as "La Fille d'Ipanema" or "Garota de Ipanema" that was composed for the musical comedy, Dirigível.

- Lyrics: Vinicius De Moraes
- Composer: Antonio Carlos Jobin

Downtown, also known as "Dans le Temps," was released on 1973 by Petula Clark.

- Duration: 3:20
- Lyrics: Tony Hotch
- Composer: Tony Hotch

Otome no Namida is known as "Une Écharpe, Une Rose." It was popularized by Chantal Goya when it was released on 1965.

- Lyrics: Roger Dumas
- Composer: Jean-Jacques Debout

Suteki na Ōjisama is originally known as "Un Prince Charmant". It was released on January 6, 1976 as a part of France Gall's first album.

- Lyrics: Maurice Vidalin
- Composer: Jacques Datin

Muzōsa Shinshi is originally known as "L'aquoiboniste." It was released on 1978 by Jane Birkin.

- Lyrics: Serge Gainsbourg
- Composer: Serge Gainsbourg

=== Greek songs ===
Ehe Ya: Sayōnara is a Greek song, originally written as "Εχε Γειά." It was released on 2000 by Eleftheria Arvanitaki.

- Lyrics: Eleni Zioga
- Composer: Evanthia Reboutsika

Osavurio: Ai wa Matte Kurenai is originally released on 1967 by Nana Mouskouri with its original title written in Greek alphabet, "Ωςαύριο".

- Lyrics: Eleni Zioga
- Composer: Evanthia Reboutsika
- Duration: 3:11

=== Italian songs ===
Amore Scusami is an Italian song popularized by Dalida on 1964.

- Lyrics: Vito Pallavicini
- Composer: Gino Mescoli

== Charts ==
Release	Chart	Peak position	Chart run
April 23, 2003	Oricon Daily Singles Chart	8	
April 23, 2003	Oricon Weekly Singles Chart	29	3 weeks
