= Dream Morning Musume =

Japanese female pop group

- Also known as: Morning Musume OG (モーニング娘。OG), DreaMusu (ドリムス。)
- Origin: Tokyo, Japan
- Genre: J-pop
- Years active: 2011–2012
- Label: Zetima
- Spinoff of: Morning Musume
- Members: Yuko Nakazawa; Kaori Iida; Natsumi Abe; Kei Yasuda; Mari Yaguchi; Rika Ishikawa; Hitomi Yoshizawa; Makoto Ogawa; Miki Fujimoto; Koharu Kusumi
- Website: dream-morningmusume.com

Dream Morning Musume (ドリーム モーニング娘。) was a Japanese pop group formed in 2011, comprising 10 former members of Morning Musume. Like Morning Musume, it was managed by Up-Front Agency and produced by Tsunku. Tsuji Nozomi declined an invitation to join to focus on raising her children.

The group debuted in April 2011 with Dreams 1, which peaked at No. 10 on the Oricon Weekly Albums Chart. Its first nationwide concert tour began on September 24, 2011, with Miki Fujimoto absent on maternity leave.

The group's first single "Shining Butterfly" was released on February 15, 2012, debuting at number 7 in the Oricon daily sales ranking for February 14.

== Members ==
- Yuko Nakazawa (中澤裕子)
- Kaori Iida (飯田圭織)
- Natsumi Abe (安倍なつみ)
- Kei Yasuda (保田圭)
- Mari Yaguchi (矢口真里)
- Rika Ishikawa (石川梨華)
- Hitomi Yoshizawa (吉澤ひとみ)
- Makoto Ogawa (小川麻琴)
- Miki Fujimoto (藤本美貴)
- Koharu Kusumi (久住小春)

== Discography ==
=== Singles ===
| # | Title | Release date | Charts | |
| # | Title | Release date | Oricon Weekly Singles Chart | |
| # | Title | Release date | Top position | Weeks on chart |
|---|---|---|---|---|
| 1 | "Shining Butterfly" (シャイニングバタフライ) | February 15, 2012 | 12 | |

=== Albums ===
| # | Title | Release date | Charts | |
| # | Title | Release date | Oricon Weekly Albums Chart | |
| # | Title | Release date | Top position | Weeks on chart |
|---|---|---|---|---|
| 1 | Dreams (1) (ドリムス。①) | April 20, 2011 | 10 | 5 |

=== DVD ===
| # | Title | Release date | Charts | |
| # | Title | Release date | Oricon Weekly DVDs Chart | |
| # | Title | Release date | Top position | Weeks on chart |
|---|---|---|---|---|
| 1 | Dream Morning Musume Concert Tour 2011 Haru no Mai (Sotsugyōsei DE Saikessei) (ドリーム モーニング娘。コンサートツアー2011春の舞 ~卒業生DE再結成~) | September 14, 2011 | 7 | 4 |

== Videography ==
=== Music videos ===
| Single # | Title | Official YouTube link |
|---|---|---|
| 1 | "Shining Butterfly" | watch |
