= Love Machine (Morning Musume song) =

Single by Morning Musume

from the album 3rd-Love Paradise
- Released: September 9, 1999 (JP)
- Recorded: 1999
- Genre: J-pop; electropop
- Length: 14:47 (8 cm CD)
- Label: Zetima
- Songwriter: Tsunku
- Producer: Tsunku

Morning Musume singles chronology
"Furusato" (1999)	"Love Machine" (1999)	"Koi no Dance Site" (2000)

Music video
- Love Machine on YouTube

"Love Machine" (LOVEマシーン, Rabu Mashiin) is Morning Musume's 7th single, released on September 9, 1999 as an 8 cm CD. It sold a total of 1,646,630 copies, making it a massive hit (a #1 single in Japan) and their highest selling single. In 2004, it was re-released as part of the Early Single Box and again in 2005 as a 12 cm CD. The single also marked the debut of the "Third Generation" member Maki Goto and the departure of Aya Ishiguro.

== Packaging ==
The original 8 cm CD release was housed in a J-card-type 12 cm slimline single case instead of the then-industry CD snap-pack packaging. The case used was 7 mm thick, showing artwork through the front, and also through the spine and part of the back of the case. The CD itself was inserted upside-down, allowing the artwork on the disc itself to show through the transparent back of the case. This is one of only two 8 cm CD singles released by Morning Musume to adhere this packaging (the other being their eighth single Koi no Dance Site (2000)).

== Legacy ==
In 2008, a remade version of the song was released by Scott Murphy of Allister in his album Guilty Pleasures 3.

In 2009, the song was remade into Korean by South Korean girl group After School under the name "Dream Girl", and Avex Group posted a "RIKI version" by actor Riki Takeuchi on its official YouTube channel in celebration of the song's tenth anniversary.

In 2013, Moametal of the kawaii metal group Babymetal performed a cover during their Legend 1999 show at NHK Hall. The song was chosen because it was a hit in 1999, the year of Moametal and fellow member Yuimetal's birth.

Love Machine is featured in Ubisoft's Japanese Just Dance Wii U

In 2025, the song was remade into Thai and was used as the 10th anniversary celebration song for Japan Expo Thailand 2025.

== Track listing ==
The lyricist, composer and producer of both songs is Tsunku. "Love Machine" was arranged by Dance☆Man, while "21seiki" was arranged by Shunsuke Suzuki.

=== 8 cm CD ===
This is the original edition of the single and has a catalog number, EPDE-1052.

1. Love Machine (Loveマシーン) – 5:02
2. 21 Seiki (21世紀, 21st century) – 4:45
3. Love Machine (Instrumental) (Loveマシーン (Instrumental)) – 5:01

=== LP ===
This edition has a catalog number, EPJE-5035.

- A side

1. Love Machine (Loveマシーン)
2. Love Machine (Instrumental) (Loveマシーン (Instrumental))

- B side

1. Love Machine ~Analog Remix~ (Loveマシーン ～Analog Remix～)
2. Love Machine ~Analog Remix~ (Instrumental) (Loveマシーン ～Analog Remix～ (Instrumental))
3. Secret Track (シークレットトラック)

=== 12 cm CD ===
This edition was released as the 7th disc of the Early Single Box with catalogue number EPCE-5327 and as an individual release with catalog number EPCE-5319.

1. Love Machine (Loveマシーン)
2. 21 Seiki (21世紀)
3. Love Machine (Instrumental) (Loveマシーン (Instrumental))
4. Love Machine (Early Unision Version) (Loveマシーン)

== Members at time of single ==
- 1st generation: Yuko Nakazawa, Natsumi Abe, Aya Ishiguro (last single), Kaori Iida
- 2nd generation: Sayaka Ichii, Mari Yaguchi, Kei Yasuda
- 3rd generation (debut): Maki Goto

== Personnel ==
=== LOVE Machine ===
- Dance☆Man - Arranger
- The Band☆Man
  - Hyu Hyu - Drums
  - Toca - Bass
  - Jump Man - Guitar
  - Bomb - Guitar
  - Wata-Boo - Keyboard
  - Stage Chakka Man - Percussion
  - D.J. Ichiro - Turntable
- Tsunku - Chorus

=== 21 Seiki ===
- Shunsuke Suzuki - Arranger
- Tatsuya Murakami - Strings arranger

== Cover versions ==
- Janet Kay with Ai Takahashi covered the song in English on her 2012 cover album Idol Kay.
