= 3rd: Love Paradise =

3rd-Love Paradise-

Studio album by Morning Musume
- Released: March 23, 2000
- Recorded: 1999–2000
- Genres: Pop; electronica; dance; pop rock
- Length: 50:58
- Label: Zetima
- Producer: Tsunku

Morning Musume chronology
Second Morning (1999)	3rd-Love Paradise- (2000)	Best! Morning Musume 1 (2001)

Singles from 3rd: Love Paradise
- 1. "Love Machine" Released: September 9, 1999; 2. "Koi no Dance Site" Released: January 26, 2000

3rd: Love Paradise (3rd －Loveパラダイス－) is the third studio album from the J-pop girl idol group Morning Musume, released on March 23, 2000.

== Overview ==
This was the group's most successful album (with the exception of the "best of" albums) selling 863,300 copies and stayed at the Top 30 in the Oricon charts for 7 weeks. It had two of Morning Musume's top selling singles "Love Machine" and "Koi no Dance Site".

The album was certified Million by the Recording Industry Association of Japan for physical sales of over 1 million copies.

== Legacy ==
In 2004, Maki Goto would later record a solo version of "Kuchizuke no Sono Ato" for her second solo album 2 Paint It Gold.

== Track listing ==
No.	Title	Length
1.	"Ohayō (～おはよう～, ~'Morning~)"	2:02
2.	"Love Machine (LOVEマシーン)"	5:01
3.	"Aisha Loan de (愛車ローンで, A Beloved Car on Loan)"	4:47
4.	"Kuchizuke no Sono Ato (くちづけのその後, Right After the Kiss)"	4:54
5.	"Koi no Dance Site (恋のダンスサイト, Dance site of love)"	4:29
6.	"Lunchtime (Rebanira Itame) (ランチタイム～レバニラ炒め～, Lunchtime (Liver Leek Stir Fry))"	3:32
7.	"Dance Suru no da! (Danceするのだ!, The Fact is, We Dance!)"	4:50
8.	"Omoide (おもいで, Memory)"	4:39
9.	"Harajuku 6:00 Shūgō (原宿6:00集合, Meeting at Harajuku at 6:00)"	4:23
10.	"Why"	4:51
11.	"...Suki da yo! (「、、、好きだよ！」, "... I Love You!")"	5:34
12.	"Oyasumi (～おやすみ～, Good Night)"	1:56
