= Morning Coffee (song) =

Single by Morning Musume

from the album First Time
- Released: January 28, 1998 (JP) May 4, 1998 (US)
- Recorded: 1998
- Genre: J-pop
- Length: 13:15 (8 cm CD)
- Label: One Up Music
- Songwriter: Tsunku
- Producer: Tsunku

Morning Musume singles chronology
| "Ai no Tane" (1997) | "Morning Coffee" (1998) | "Summer Night Town" (1998) |

Music video
- Morning Coffee on YouTube

"Morning Coffee" (モーニングコーヒー) is a song by J-pop idol group Morning Musume, released as their first official single on January 28, 1998, as an 8 cm CD. It sold a total of 200,790 copies. In 2004, it was re-released as part of the Early Single Box and again in 2005 as a 12 cm CD. The lead vocalist of the single was Natsumi Abe.

Early on, Tsunku had decided that Kaori Iida was going to be the lead vocalist. Before the recording on the second day, Tsunku changed his mind and told the group that he was going to change the lead vocals to Abe instead.

A re-arranged and re-recorded version of this song was featured as the B-side for Morning Musume's 14th single, "Souda! We're Alive".

It is the group's only major-label single to exclusively feature the original members, as the second generation would join before the release of "Summer Night Town". It is also their first and only single to be released by the defunct Up-Front Group-affiliated label One Up Music and distributed through Warner Music Japan; before the release of the group's next single, One Up Music would end its distribution deal with Warner and merge with Y.J. Sounds (another former Up-Front Group-affiliated label) to form a new label called Zetima. Distribution rights for Zetima's catalog would be given to Sony Music Japan's sub label Epic Records for "Summer Night Town", Morning Musume's first album "First Time" and all of Zetima's subsequent releases.

== Track listing ==
The "Ai no Tane" tracks were composed by Hanzō Seiki and Tetsutarō Sakurai. All other tracks were composed by Tsunku.

=== 8 cm CD ===
1. Morning Coffee (モーニングコーヒー) – 4:32
2. Ai no Tane (愛の種, Seeds of love) – 4:11
3. Morning Coffee (Instrumental) (モーニングコーヒー (Instrumental)) – 4:32

=== 12 cm CD (Early Single Box and individual release) ===
1. Morning Coffee (モーニングコーヒー) – 4:32
2. Ai no Tane (愛の種, Seeds of love) – 4:11
3. Morning Coffee (Instrumental) (モーニングコーヒー (Instrumental)) – 4:32
4. Morning Coffee (Unreleased "B♭" Version) (モーニングコーヒー (Unreleased "B♭" Version)) –

== Members at time of single ==
- 1st generation: Yuko Nakazawa, Aya Ishiguro, Kaori Iida, Natsumi Abe, Asuka Fukuda

== Performances ==
=== In television shows ===
- 1998-02-09 – Hey! Hey! Hey! Music Champ
- 2000-10-08 – Hello! Morning - Episode 027 (Last Phrase Karaoke)

=== In concerts ===
- Hello! First Live at Shibuya Kohkaido
- Morning Musume Memory Seishun no Hikari
- Morning Musume First Live at Budokan ~Dancing Love Site 2000 Haru~
- Morning Musume Live Revolution 21 Haru
- Morning Musume Concert Tour 2002 Haru "Love Is Alive!" (2002 Version)
- Morning Musume Concert Tour 2003 "15nin de Non Stop!"
- Morning Musume Sakuragumi Hatsukouen ~Sakura Saku~
- Hello! Project 2005 Winter All-Stars Dairanbu ~A Happy New Power! Iida Kaori Sotsugyo Special~
- Morning Musume Concert Tour 2005 Haru ~Dai 6 kan Hit Mankai~
- Nochiura Natsumi Concert Tour 2005 Haru "Triangle Energy" (2002 Version)
- Morning Musume Concert Tour 2008 Haru "Single Daizenshuu!!"

== Oricon Rank and Sales ==
| Weekly Rating | Weekly Sales | Number of copies sold | Week | Number of Weeks on Chart |
|---|---|---|---|---|
| 6 | 95,060 | 95,060 | 01/26~02/01 | 1 |
| 14 | 33,680 | 128,740 | 02/02~02/08 | 2 |
| 22 | 29,030 | 157,770 | 02/09~02/15 | 3 |
| 29 | 16,500 | 174,270 | 02/16~02/22 | 4 |
| 42 | 9,670 | 183,940 | 02/23~03/01 | 5 |
| 53 | 7,560 | 191,500 | 03/02~03/08 | 6 |
| 64 | 5,470 | 196,970 | 03/09~03/15 | 7 |
| 78 | 3,820 | 200,790 | 03/16~03/22 | 8 |
