= Petit Moni =

Subgroup of Morning Musume

Petit Moni プッチモニ
- Petit Moni 3rd generation, 2003

Background information
- Origin: Tokyo, Japan
- Genres: J-pop
- Years active: 1999–2003
- Label: Zetima
- Spinoffs: Petit Moni V
- Spinoff of: Morning Musume
- Past members: Sayaka Ichii; Kei Yasuda; Maki Goto; Hitomi Yoshizawa; Makoto Ogawa; Ayaka Kimura
- Website: www.helloproject.com

Petit Moni (プッチモニ, Pucchi Moni) was a sub-unit of the Japanese idol girl group Morning Musume and associated with Hello! Project. It was formed by Up-Front Promotion in November 1999 as the second sub-group of Morning Musume.

== Members ==
=== First generation ===
- Kei Yasuda
- Sayaka Ichii
- Maki Goto

=== Second generation ===
- Kei Yasuda (Leader)
- Maki Goto
- Hitomi Yoshizawa

=== Third generation ===
- Hitomi Yoshizawa (Leader)
- Makoto Ogawa
- Ayaka Kimura (from Coconuts Musume)

== Legacy ==
In 2009, Petit Moni was revived as a Hello! Project Shuffle Unit under the name Petit Moni V (プッチモニV). Its new lineup consisted of Cute members Saki Nakajima and Mai Hagiwara; and Erina Mano. The "V" in its name is for "victory." The group released songs for Hello! Project's compilation albums Champloo 1: Happy Marriage Song Cover Shū and Petit Best 10.

== Discography ==
=== Singles ===
No.	Title	Release date	Charts	Album
No.	Title	Release date	JPN	Album
1	"Chokotto Love" (ちょこっとLove)	25 November 1999	1	Zenbu! Petitmoni
2	"Seishun Jidai 1. 2. 3! / Baisekō Daiseikō!" (青春時代 1.2.3！／バイセコー大成功！)	26 July 2000	1	Zenbu! Petitmoni
3	"Baby! Koi ni Knock Out!" (Baby！恋にKnock Out！)	28 February 2001	1	Zenbu! Petitmoni
4	"Pittari Shitai X'mas!" (ぴったりしたいX'mas！)	14 November 2001	2	Zenbu! Petitmoni

=== Albums ===
No.	Title	Details	Charts
No.	Title	Details	JPN
1	Zenbu! Petitmoni (ぜんぶ！プッチモニ)	Released: 21 August 2002; Label: Zetima; Formats: CD etc.	1

=== Compilation tracks ===
- Together! - "Chokotto Love (2001 Version)"
- Petit Best 3 - "Chokotto Love (2003 Version)"
- Petit Best 4 - "Wow Wow Wow"
- Chanpuru 1: Happy Marriage Song Cover Shū - "Kimi ga Iru Daki de"
- Petit Best 10 - "Pira! Otome no Negai"

== Live Only Songs ==
- Chokotto LOVE (Petitmoni V)
- BABY! Koi ni KNOCK OUT (Petitmoni V)
- Uwaki na Honey Pie (Petitmoni V)
- WOW WOW WOW (Petitmoni V)
