= Asayan =

- Genre: Reality television
- Presented by: Ninety Nine; Hiromi Nagasaku; Emiri Nakayama
- Narrated by: Jiei Kabira; Takashi Matsuo; Hisashi Yamada
- Country of origin: Japan
- Original language: Japanese
- No. of seasons: 25 seasons

Production
- Executive producer: Kōshi Hashiyama
- Producers: Takura Sakuyai; Takashi Iguchi; Masataka Izumi; Akihiko Okamoto; Kazuoki Takeno
- Camera setup: Multi-camera

Original release
- Network: TV Tokyo
- Release: October 1, 1995 – March 2002

Asayan, originally known as Asakusabashi Young Yōhinten (浅草橋ヤング洋品店; lit. "Asakusabashi Young [Western-style] Products Store") was a talent search variety show that aired on TV Tokyo from 1995 to 2002. Some idols that were originally discovered through Asayan auditions produced by Tsunku, formed groups that worked under the umbrella group, later to be named as the Hello! Project.

Morning Musume and Chemistry were formed from idols that made a debut in Asayan, but also solo artists like Ami Suzuki and Yumi Matsuzawa debuted in the show. The group dos were formed on the show.

== Cast ==
=== MC ===
- Ninety Nine (ナインティナイン)
  - Takashi Okamura (岡村隆史)
  - Hiroyuki Yabe (矢部浩之)
- Hiromi Nagasaku (永作博美; from start to September 1998)
- Emiri Nakayama (中山エミリ/中山亜微梨; from January 1999 to end)

=== Narration ===
- Jiei Kabira (川平慈英; from start to April 1998)
- Takashi Matsuo (松尾貴史; from 1999 to April 2001)
- Hisashi Yamada (やまだひさし; from April 2001 to end)
