= Asuka Fukuda =

Japanese singer and dancer (born 1984)

Asuka Fukuda 福田 明日香
- Born: December 17, 1984 (age 41)
- Occupations: Singer; Dancer
- Website: Hello! Project.com
- Musical career
- Genres: J-pop
- Years active: 1997–1999; 2011–present
- Labels: Zetima(1997–1999, 2018); Cloud Cuckoo Land inc. (2011–present)

Asuka Fukuda (福田 明日香, Fukuda Asuka) (born December 17, 1984) is a Japanese pop singer, and she was a member of Japanese girl group Morning Musume from 1997 until April 18, 1999. Her only album with the group is the 1998 release First Time. She was the first ever Hello! Project member to graduate.

== Overview ==
In 1997, Fukuda joined Morning Musume along with Yuko Nakazawa, Aya Ishiguro, Natsumi Abe, and Kaori Iida. Although she was the youngest member at that time, she was the first to graduate in April 1999. Her last single with Morning Musume was Memory Seishun no Hikari. In 2005, she was working as an assistant at her father's nightclub "Philippine" in Tokyo. On November 9, 2011, her long-awaited comeback album Double Fantasy, as a part of Peacestone, was released.

In 2017, she appeared for the first time in 18 years with other former members of Morning Musume for the recording and music video of "Ai no Tane; 20th Anniversary Version". In January 2018, she also appeared in the recording and video of "Morning Coffee; 20th Anniversary Version"; and participated in many TV and other public appearances with other former and current members of the group.

She is a mother of a little girl born February 14, 2016.
