= Sayaka Ichii =

Japanese pop singer and TV talent (born 1983)

Sayaka Ichii 市井 紗耶香
- Also known as: Sayarin, Kā-san; Sayaka Watanabe (渡邊 紗耶香)
- Born: December 31, 1983 (age 42)
- Origin: Funabashi, Chiba, Japan
- Genre: Japanese pop
- Occupations: Singer; Actress; Dancer
- Years active: 1998–present
- Labels: Up-Front Agency (May 1998 — November 2003); Ranves (August 2009 — 2013？); UnderZ Group Co., Ltd. (2014? — January 2016); Arc-en-Ciel (November 2019 — February 2020); A. Round (April 2026 — )
- Spinoffs: Morning Musume, Cubic-Cross, Petitmoni, Aoiro 7, OFR48
- Website: Sayaka Ichii - Ranves

Sayaka Ichii (市井 紗耶香, Ichii Sayaka; born December 31, 1983) is a Japanese pop singer and former member for Japanese girl group Morning Musume. She is now a TV talent and actress.

== History ==
=== Morning Musume and Hello Project ===
Ichii was born in Funabashi, Chiba, and joined the girl group Morning Musume in 1998. She, along with Mari Yaguchi and Kei Yasuda, formed the second generation of members. While in Morning Musume, Sayaka Ichii was put into the spin-off group, Petitmoni with Maki Goto and Kei Yasuda . Ichii was also part of the Hello Project! Summer Shuffles 2000 group Aoiro 7. She also recorded a folk song album with Yuko Nakazawa. She left Morning Musume in May to continue her education.

=== After Morning Musume ===
Sayaka Ichii graduated from Morning Musume and Hello! Project after the single "Happy Summer Wedding" in 2000. A year after she left, she formed the group Ichii Sayaka in Cubic-Cross, trio with Taisei (keyboardist from Sharan Q), and wrote two of their songs. In 2003, Cubic-Cross disbanded, and after a solo single.

She retired from the music business at the end of the year. In February, she joined Ranves Management agency. On August 30, she returned to TV in a TBS show called Sunday Japan.

She also as a politician by the member of Constitutional Democratic Party of Japan, she was a member of House of Councillors of Japan on 26 April 2024, but she only served 93 minutes and resigned on the same day.

=== Personal life ===
Ichii announced in 2004 that she was pregnant and was to marry the group's guitarist, Naoki Yoshizawa. The couple had two daughters but divorced in 2011. Ichii later remarried to a beautician and gave birth to a son. Her fourth baby was born in 2017.

== Discography and releases ==
=== Albums ===
Duet with Yuko Nakazawa

- Folk Songs (November 29, 2001)

Ichii Sayaka in Cubic-Cross

- C:BOX (November 20, 2002)

=== Singles ===
Sayaka Ichii in Cubic-Cross

- Jinsei Ga Mou Hajimatteru (April 24, 2002)
- Shitsuren Love Song (July 17, 2002)
- Todoke! Koi no Telepathy (November 9, 2002)
- Zutto Zutto (May 1, 2003)

Sayaka Ichii

- 4U ~Hitasura~ (September 3, 2003)

=== DVD ===
- Folk Days (February 28, 2002)

=== Photobooks ===
- Self (February 10, 2002)
