= Yuko Nakazawa =

Japanese singer, dancer, and actress

Yuko Nakazawa 中澤 裕子
- Also known as: Yū-chan
- Born: June 19, 1973 (age 53)
- Occupations: Singer; Actress; Model; Dancer
- Musical career
- Genres: J-pop; enka
- Years active: 1997–present
- Label: Zetima
- Website: Hello! Project.com

Yuko Nakazawa (中澤 裕子, Nakazawa Yūko; born June 19, 1973) is a Japanese pop and enka singer, and actress, best known as one of the original members of the all-female J-pop group Morning Musume. She is also a member of Japanese pop group Dream Morning Musume.

== Biography ==
Yuko Nakazawa was born in Kyoto Prefecture. She was one of five runners-up in a 1997 talent contest for a new Japanese pop idol. After the contest, musician and producer Tsunku offered Nakazawa and the four other runners-up (Natsumi Abe, Kaori Iida, Aya Ishiguro, and Asuka Fukuda) the chance to be taken under his wing under one condition: they must sell 50,000 CDs of their debut song "Ai no Tane" with five days of live promotion. The quintet accomplished that task in four and thus Morning Musume was born. The group has since grown increasingly popular, it maintains a "school-like" system for their continuous line-up changes, with older members "graduating" and new, usually younger, members selected from nationwide auditions admitted to the group almost annually.

In 1998, shortly after Morning Musume's formation, Nakazawa began a solo career, beginning with enka styled songs. She gradually moved to a more pop sound, but has recently gone back to enka with her eleventh single, "Urara." Her solo work has allowed her voice to shine in a way it rarely did in Morning Musume, as she mostly sung harmonies with only a few solo lines.

Nakazawa has been a regular featured singer on Hello! Project's "Folk Songs" series. She was also placed in Akagumi 4 in Hello! Project's 2000 summer shuffles and Puripuri Pink in Hello!Project's 2005 summer shuffles, as well as participating in H.P. All Stars along with most of the rest of Hello!Project in 2004.

Being the oldest of the 1st generation of Morning Musume—she was 24 at the time of formation and nearly 28 upon leaving the group—Nakazawa held the role of the group's leader until her graduation on April 15, 2001. She has cited her reasons for leaving as being her age (she was 14 years older than the youngest member of the troupe, then 13-year-old Ai Kago, at the time of her departure) and her desire to pursue other things by the time she was 30.

Since then, Nakazawa has done some work in Japanese dramas such as Beauty 7 and Home Maker, performed in various plays, and continued in her solo singing career at a steady pace with reasonable success. She worked closely with Morning Musume and hosted their weekly show Hello! Morning (first regularly, then occasionally), until its end in early 2007.

It was announced on October 19, 2008, by Hello! Project that Nakazawa, along with the rest of Elder Club will graduate from Hello! Project on March 31, 2009. On February 1, 2009, during the "Hello Pro Award '09 ~Elder Club Sotsugyō Kinen Special~" concert held at Yokohama Arena, Nakazawa passed on her leadership position in Hello! Project to Ai Takahashi of Morning Musume.

In 2010, it was announced Yuko Nakazawa will be joining the new group, "Dream Morning Musume" alongside other former-Morning Musume members.

== Personal life ==
In March 2012, it was announced that Nakazawa had married an information technology company president one year her senior in a private ceremony. They have two sons.

== Discography ==
=== Albums ===
#	Title	Release date	Peak rank	Short description
Studio albums
1	Nakazawa Yūko Dai Isshō (中澤ゆうこ 第一章)	December 12, 1998	#59	Included singles: Karasu no Nyōbō, Odaiba Moonlight Serenade
2	Dai Nisshō ~Tsuyogari~ (第二章～強がり～)	July 22, 2004	#31	Included singles: Junjō Kōshinkyoku, Shanghai no Kaze, Kuyashi Namida Porori, Futarigurashi, Tokyo Bijin, Get Along with You, Genki no Nai Hi no Komoriuta, Do My Best
Folk Songs Series
1	Folk Songs	November 29, 2001	#9	Along with Sayaka Ichii
2	Folk Songs 2	May 22, 2002	#20	Along with Melon Kinenbi, Rika Ishii, and Aya Matsuura
3	FS3 Folk Songs 3	October 23, 2002	#17	Along with Maki Goto and Miki Fujimoto
4	FS4 Folk Songs 4	May 21, 2003	#25	Along with Kei Yasuda, Mari Yaguchi, and Melon Kinenbi
5	FS5 ~Sotsugyō~ (FS5～卒業～)	February 25, 2004	#36	Along with Natsumi Abe, Kei Yasuda, Maki Goto, Country Musume, and Aya Matsuura
Other albums
–	Guilty Pleasures 3 (Scott Murphy)	December 3, 2008	#20	Scott Murphy's third cover album, featuring a cover of LOVE Machine with Yuko Nakazawa, Natsumi Abe and Kei Yasuda
–	Legend	December 10, 2008	#182	Compilation album

=== Singles ===
#	Title	Release date	Peak rank
1	"Karasu no Nyōbō" (カラスの女房)	October 5, 1998	#19
2	"Odaiba Moonlight Serenade" (お台場ムーンライトセレナーデ)	December 2, 1998	#29
3	"Junjō Kōshinkyoku" (純情行進曲)	June 9, 1999	#24
4	"Shanghai no Kaze" (上海の風)	July 12, 2000	#18
5	"Kuyashi Namida Porori" (悔し涙ぽろり)	February 15, 2001	#13
6	"Futari Gurashi" (二人暮し)	August 1, 2001	#13
7	"Tokyo Bijin" (東京美人)	August 28, 2002	#14
8	"Get Along with You"	May 21, 2003	#30
9	"Genki no nai Hi Komoriuta / Nagaragawa no Hare" (元気のない日の子守唄／長良川の晴れ)	February 11, 2004	#42
10	"Do My Best"	May 26, 2004	#52
11	"Urara" (うらら)	September 27, 2006	#32
12	"Danna-sama" (だんな様)	October 10, 2007	#57

=== Videos / DVDs ===
#	Title	Release date
1	Folk Days ~Ichii Sayaka with Nakazawa Yuko~ (Folk Days～市井紗耶香with中澤裕子～)	February 28, 2002
2	Nakazawa Yuko Singles M Collection 1 (中澤裕子シングルMクリップス①)	November 27, 2002
3	Shishi wa Mini ga Osuki ~At Studio Dream Maker~ (紳士はミニがお好き！～At Studio Dream Maker～)	January 22, 2003
4	FS3 Live	February 26, 2003

== Acts ==
=== Dramas ===
Title	Start date	End date	TV station
Beauty 7 (ビューティ7)	2001–07	2001–09	Nippon Television
Mukai Arata no Dōbutsu Nikki ~Aiken Rossinante no Sainan~ (向井荒太の動物日記～愛犬ロシナンテの災難～)	2001-01	2001–03	Nippon Television
Ginza no Koi (ギンザの恋)	2002-01	2002–03	Nippon Television
Gokusen (ごくせん)	2002–04	2002–06	Nippon Television
Densetsu no Madame (伝説のマダム)	2003		Nippon Television
Kochira Hon Ikegami Sho (こちら本池上署)	2004-01	2004-03	TBS
Kochira Hon Ikegami Sho (こちら本池上署)	2004–10	2004–12	TBS
Kochira Hon Ikegami Sho (こちら本池上署)	2005–06	2005–09	TBS
Home Maker (ほーむめーかー)	2004-04	2004–06	TBS
Getsuyou Golden (月曜ゴールデン)	2007-04-23		TBS

=== Variety shows ===
Title	Start date	End date	TV station
Hello! Morning (ハロー!モーニング。)	2000–03	2007–03	TV Tokyo
Idol wo Sagase! (アイドルをさがせ!)	1999-01-05	1999-12-28	TV Tokyo
Idol wo Sagase! (アイドルをさがせ!)	2001–04	2002-03-26	TV Tokyo
M no Mokushiroku (Mの黙示録)	2001-10-07	2004-09-28	TV Asahi
Hello Land (ハローランド)	—		Fuji Television
NHK Junior Special (NHKジュニアスペシャル)	—		NHK
Osaka Hatsu Genki Dash! Doyah (大阪発元気ダッシュ!Doyah)	2001	2005-02-12	NHK
Cchu~Nen (っちゅ～ねん!)	2005-04	2006-03	Mainichi Broadcasting System
Chichin Puipui (ちちんぷいぷい)	2006-04-11	2006-09-26	Mainichi Broadcasting System
Morita Kazuyoshi Hour: Waratte Ii to mo (森田一義アワー 笑っていいとも!)	2001–10	2003-03	Fuji Television
Morita Kazuyoshi Hour: Waratte Ii to mo (森田一義アワー 笑っていいとも!)	2005-01-18	2006-07-03	Fuji Television

=== Movies ===
Title	Release	Character	Company
Mini Moni ja Movie: Okashi na Daibōken! (ミニモニ。じゃムービーおかしな大冒険)	14 December 2002	Fairy Queen	Toei Company
Tetsujin 28-go (鉄人28号)	19 March 2005	Ejima Kana (江島香奈)	Shochiku

=== Radio shows ===
- Nakazawa Yuko no All Night Nippon Super!
  - Nakazawa Yuko no All Night Nippon Sunday Special → Nakazawa Yuko no All Night Nippon Sunday Super!
- Young Town Douyoubi
- Music Plaza's Kimama ni Classic
- Maji Asa!

=== Commercials ===
- Elleseine
- Nihon Chouou Keiba
- Oriko card
- Shiseidou City Veil

== Publications ==
=== Photobooks ===
Title	Release date	Produced by	ISBN
Feather	2001–08	Wani Books	ISBN 4-8470-2671-3
Watashi ga Omou, Konna Onna (私が思う、こんな女)	2001–11	Wani Books	ISBN 4-8470-2739-6

=== Essay books ===
- 2002 – Kaishin (改心)
- 2003 – Zutto Ushiro Kara Mite Kita (ずっと後ろから見てきた)
- 2013 – Musume. kara Haha e (娘。から母へ)
