= Kei Yasuda =

Japanese singer, musician and actress

- Born: December 6, 1980 (age 45); Futtsu, Japan
- Occupations: Singer; Actress; Dancer; Musician
- Musical career
- Genres: Pop
- Instruments: Vocals; piano; saxophone
- Years active: 1998–present
- Label: Zetima
- Formerly of: Morning Musume, Dream Morning Musume
- Website: Hello! Project.com

Kei Yasuda (保田 圭, Yasuda Kei; born on December 6, 1980) is a Japanese singer, musician and actress under the Hello! Project. She was a member and co-leader of the Japanese girl group Morning Musume. Yasuda, along with Mari Yaguchi and Sayaka Ichii, were the second generation of singers to be recruited into Morning Musume. Morning Musume had only released one official single, Morning Coffee, prior to their joining. Yasuda was also a member of Japanese pop group Dream Morning Musume.

== Biography ==
Yasuda was born in Futtsu, Chiba, and attended Kimitsu Shogyo (Commercial) High School in Futtsu City, Chiba Prefecture, but dropped out to pursue her dreams in the entertainment industry. She worked in a McDonald's restaurant in her hometown, until 1998.

She was chosen to be in the second generation of Morning Musume. After they joined, Morning Musume went on to produce one album and three more singles until Asuka Fukuda decided to leave to pursue her studies. Yasuda was given almost all of Fukuda's lines in future performances of these early songs. She had also collaborated with other Morning Musume members in special projects during these early days. One of the more notable ones was when she co-wrote and co-sang with Natsumi Abe the song "Sanpo" for a radio contest. It became wildly popular and a petition was circulated to make it an official single, though that never happened.

Yasuda and Ichii sang a particularly catchy duet known as "Otome no Shinrigaku" (Girl's Psychology) on Morning Musume's second album. In response to the popularity, Tsunku decided to group them together with the third generation member, Maki Goto to create the Morning Musume subgroup Petitmoni (also known as Pucchimoni) in 1999. Their first single, "Chokotto Love," sold over a million copies.

After Ichii left Morning Musume and Petitmoni, fourth generation member Hitomi Yoshizawa joined the subgroup. Yasuda had taken on the role of leader for Petitmoni and the group continued to produce three singles and an album.

After Morning Musume's then-leader Yuko Nakazawa left in 2001, Yasuda (who was the oldest member of the group at the time) became a co-leader along with Kaori Iida.

Yasuda left in mid-2003 at the same time when Morning Musume's 6th generation became full-fledged members. Tsunku commented that this one-time sixteen-member formation will be the largest Morning Musume. During her good-bye concert, Yasuda sang a remixed rock version of "Never Forget," which was also Fukuda's good-bye song. Additionally, as a special gift, Tsunku gave Yasuda a CD of her own solo version of "As for One Day," her last single with Morning Musume.

Following Yasuda's leaving, Iida became the leader of Morning Musume and Yaguchi became sub-leader. The Petitmoni leadership was handed over to Yoshizawa, and two members were added (fifth generation Morning Musume member Makoto Ogawa and Coconuts Musume's Ayaka Kimura) and Goto left. This new line up of Petitmoni never had another release, but a few of their songs were featured on compilation albums.

Yasuda was still in the Hello! Project after leaving the group, and acted in dramas outside of H!P. Within H!P, she has collaborated with Nakazawa and other H!P artists on two Folk Songs albums, performed and MC'd Abe's first solo concert, sang backup on Goto's single "Daite Yo! Please Go On," and hosted Morning Musume's weekly TV show Hello! Morning until Rika Ishikawa took that position. Yasuda participated in the H.P. All Stars single "All for One & One For All" and the Puripuri Pink shuffle unit. Puripuri Pink was a new type of shuffle unit, since it was the first unit to feature former Morning Musume members, who were usually not included in the shuffles.

During a promotional appearance on Utaban in 2004, Yasuda revealed that she has been learning how to play the flute.

Yasuda graduated from Hello! Project on March 31, 2009, along with the rest of the H!P Elder Club.

In 2010, it was announced that Kei Yasuda would be joining other former-Morning Musume members for the new group "Dream Morning Musume."

== Personal life ==
On May 29, 2013, Yasuda announced that she had married chef Kozaki Yoichi. On July 27, 2017, she has announced that she is pregnant with her first baby. Their little boy was born in January 2018.

== Musical groups ==
- Morning Musume (1998–2003)
- Petitmoni
- Kiiro 5
- 10-nin Matsuri
- Odoru 11
- H.P. All Stars
- Puripuri Pink
- Dream Morning Musume (2011–)
