= Kaori Iida =

Japanese singer and actress (born 1981)

Kaori Iida 飯田 圭織
- Also known as: Johnson, Kaorin
- Born: August 8, 1981 (age 45); Hokkaido, Japan
- Occupations: Singer; Actress; Model; Dancer
- Years active: 1997–present
- Musical career
- Genres: J-pop; Euro-enka
- Labels: Zetima; Chichūkai
- Website: Hello! Project.com

Kaori Iida (飯田 圭織, Iida Kaori; born August 8, 1981) is a Japanese pop singer and actress, associated with Hello! Project and best known as a founding member of the girl band Morning Musume. She has also recorded with the Morning Musume side project band Tanpopo and is currently a solo artist. During her time in the group, she was the tallest member (168 cm), earning her the nickname "Kaorin" & "Kao-tan". She is currently a member of Dream Morning Musume.

== Biography ==
Kaori Iida was born in Hokkaidō. She was one of 10 runners-up in a 1997 talent contest for a new Japanese rock idol. After the contest, musician and producer Tsunku offered Iida and four of the other runners-up (Natsumi Abe, Yuko Nakazawa, Aya Ishiguro, and Asuka Fukuda) the chance to be taken under his wing on one condition: that they sell 50,000 CDs of their song "Ai no Tane" in 5 days. The quintet accomplished that task in four and, thus, in 1997, Morning Musume was born (and their first official single "Morning Coffee" was released in 1998). The group has since been increasingly popular in Japan, has achieved a cult following in the Western world and is infamous for its fluctuation of memberships, with members "graduating" and joining frequently.

In 1998, Tsunku placed Iida into subgroup Tanpopo with Aya Ishiguro and 2nd generation Morning Musume member Mari Yaguchi, and they specialized in singing slower, more mature songs. Together they made four singles and an album. After Ishiguro graduated from Morning Musume and Tanpopo in January 2000, Iida and Yaguchi performed Tanpopo songs as a duet until Tsunku placed 4th generation Morning Musume members Ai Kago and Rika Ishikawa into the subgroup. Tanpopo's style was also given a revamping, with songs being more upbeat and pop-ish, but nonetheless still slower than Morning Musume. In this formation, Tanpopo released 3 more singles, a compilation album, and a compilation DVD.

After Morning Musume's then-leader Yuko Nakazawa graduated in the Spring of 2001, Iida took on the role as the group's leader. Additionally, when Morning Musume "split" into 2 subgroups in 2003—Iida was leader of Morning Musume Otomegumi. She is also known for keeping her hair long throughout her Morning Musume career and also for spacing out frequently.

In July 2002, Tanpopo, along with other Morning Musume subgroups Petitmoni and Minimoni, experienced changes in their membership - partly due to graduating Morning Musume members and partly to showcase the newer members. As a result, Iida (along with Mari and Ai K.) graduated from Tanpopo.

As with Hello! Project's shuffle groups, Iida was placed in punk-rock Aoiro 7 in 2000, folky festival style 10-nin Matsuri in 2001 and Odoru 11 in 2002, and ska-punk 11Water in 2003. She also participated in the 2004 summer shuffle group H.P. All Stars. In 2005, she participated in the shuffle group Puripuri Pink. She is the only member of Hello! Project to have participated in all the shuffle groups since the tradition started.

Additionally, Iida is pursuing a solo career as an artist and singer. Her solo musical career includes two albums outside of Hello! Project where she sings covers of French, Greek, and Italian songs (in their respective languages). She also has two singles in Japanese, released in advance of her impending graduation from Morning Musume—though still set in a Mediterranean-esque style; many Western fans of Morning Musume and Hello! Project have described the style of Iida's solo material as "Euro-enka". In Morning Musume, Iida mostly sang harmony with a few solo lines. Her signature song in Morning Musume is "Yume no Naka", from the group's first album. On December 29, 2004, Iida released her third album, this time within Hello! Project and in Japanese.

On January 30, 2005, Iida—the last First Generation member to still be in Morning Musume—graduated from the group to further pursue her solo singing and art careers. Mari Yaguchi took over her role as Morning Musume's leader upon Iida's graduation. On December 21, 2005, Iida released Plein D'amour: Ai ga Ippai, her fourth album. This album featured songs in Japanese and many European cover songs in their original languages. This was her first album to be released since she graduated from Morning Musume.

In early 2007, Iida was chosen to be a member of Morning Musume Tanjō 10nen Kinentai (モーニング娘。誕生10年記念隊) —a unit created to celebrate Morning Musume's 10th anniversary as a group. Morning Musume Tanjō 10nen Kinentai also consists of Natsumi Abe, Maki Goto, Risa Niigaki and Koharu Kusumi. Their first single, Bokura ga Ikiru My Asia (僕らが生きるMy Asia), was released on January 24, 2007.

After the death of her son, she stated that in his memory, she will continue her career. She returned to the concert stage at the Hello! Project 2009 Winter Elder Club: Thank You for Your Love! series, her first performance in one year and four months. She also performed at the Hello Pro Award '09: Elder Club Sotsugyō Kinen Special concert on February 1, 2009, which celebrated her graduation from Hello! Project along with 21 other Elder Club Members. Beginning in April 2009, she was to be part of M-Line, the official Morning Musume graduate fan club. In 2010, it was announced Iida Kaori would join the group "Dream Morning Musume" alongside other former Morning Musume members.

== Personal life ==
On July 7, 2007, Iida married Kenji, the former vocalist of the Japanese rock band 7House, which was produced by Tsunku and active from 1999 to 2002. The two first crossed paths during the band's active years, when they were often mistaken for a couple despite not being romantically involved. They reconnected in December 2005 and began dating in September 2006. At the time of the marriage, her agency announced that Iida was ten weeks pregnant. She went on hiatus following the conclusion of the Morning Musume 10th Year Anniversary Concert Tour: Summer '07 Thank You My Dearest on September 1. She gave birth to a baby boy on January 22, 2008. However, on November 8 of the same year, she announced that her son had died on July 27 due to a renal failure. Iida gave birth to her second child, a son, on May 13, 2013, followed by a daughter on September 19, 2017.

== Discography ==
=== Studio albums ===
No.	Album details	Charts
No.	Album details	JP Oricon
1	Osavurio: Ai wa Matte Kurenai (オサヴリオ: 愛は待ってくれない): Release date: April 23, 2003; Label: Chichūkai Label	29
2	Paradinome: Koi ni Mi o Yudanete (パラディノメ: 恋に身をゆだねて): Release date: October 22, 2003; Label: Chichūkai Label	64
3	Avenir: Mirai (アヴニール: 未来): Release date: December 29, 2004; Label: Chichūkai Label	105
4	Plein d'amour: Ai ga Ippai (プラン・ダムール: 愛がいっぱい): Release date: December 21, 2005; Label: Chichūkai Label	111
5	ONDAS: Release date: July 20, 2016; Label: Teichiku Records	

=== Singles ===
#	Title	Release date
1	Aegekai ni Dakarete (エーゲ海に抱かれて)	2004-02-04
2	Door no Mukō de Bell ga Natteta (ドアの向こうでBellが鳴ってた)	2004-07-28

=== DVD ===
- 2004-02-04 – Aegekai DVD (エーゲ海) with Shoko Aida

== Appearances ==
=== Dramas ===
- 2001 – Kochira Dai San Shaikabu (こちら第三社会部)

=== Radio ===
- Iida Kaori - Konya mo Koushin Chū! (飯田圭織・今夜も交信中!) (March 2003)
- Chichukai Sound Stroll (地中海 Sound Stroll) (April 2, 2005)

== Publications ==
=== Photobooks ===
#	Title	Release date	ISBN
1	Iida Kaori Shashinshū Kaori Kaori Kaori (飯田圭織写真集かおりKaori圭織)	2002-05-02	ISBN 4-8470-2708-6
2	Aegekai Aida Shoko & Iida Kaori Shashinshū (エーゲ海―相田翔子&飯田圭織写真集)	2004-01-28	ISBN 4-04-894254-9

=== Art/Picture Books ===
- December 2001 – Sketchbook of Heart (心のスケッチブック。, Kokoro no Suketchi Bukku)
- December 2002 – Lion's Margin (ライオンのマルジャン, Raion no Marujan)

=== Essays ===
- May 1999/June 2001 – Paranoia Diary (パラノイアダイアリー, Paranoia Daiarī)
