= Kanashimi Twilight =

Single by Morning Musume

from the album Platinum 9 Disc
- Released: April 25, 2007 (JP); May 5, 2007 (TW)
- Recorded: 2007
- Length: 12:16
- Label: Zetima
- Songwriter: Tsunku
- Producer: Tsunku

Morning Musume singles chronology
"Egao Yes Nude" (2007)	"Kanashimi Twilight" (2007)	"Onna ni Sachi Are" (2007)

Music video
- Kanashimi Twilight on YouTube

"Kanashimi Twilight" (悲しみトワイライト, Kanashimi Towairaito; "Sorrowful Twilight") is the thirty-third single of idol group Morning Musume. It was released on April 25, 2007, and was the last single for Hitomi Yoshizawa as well as Miki Fujimoto.

There are three different versions of the single. Limited edition A includes a bonus DVD with an alternate edit of the single music video, comments from Morning Musume, and a serial-numbered card and has catalog number EPCE-5465~6. Limited edition B features special package and 40-page booklet plus serial-numbered card and has catalog number EPCE-5467. The regular edition has catalog number EPCE-5468.

== Details ==
- The song was used as the ending theme of "Love Change," a popular television show in Nagoya, for the month of April.
- This is the last single to join the fourth generation Hitomi Yoshizawa (in June, Miki Fujimoto withdrew, so in fact became the last single Fujimoto). It is a single released after Junjun and Linlin join announcement, but did not participate in this work, and participated from the next single "Onna ni Sachi are".
- The main works are Hitomi Yoshizawa, Ai Takahashi, and Miki Fujimoto, and they are also in charge of the previous work "Egao YES Nude" (previous work is also Risa Niigaki). Both A and Melo are mainly Fujimoto and Takahashi, but in the big chorus there is a solo part by Yoshizawa.
- During the PV shoot, Koharu Kusumi had appendicitis, so we didn't participate when shooting everyone, and later went to shoot with the surrounding members.
- According to the Oricon chart on May 7, 2007, total sales of the singles since its debut reached 110.85 million copies, exceeding Pink Lady's 11.37 million copies, making it the number one female group in history. Moreover, the initial sales exceeded 50,000 copies since 2005's "Iroppoi jirettai".

== Track listing ==
All lyrics are written by Tsunku.

=== CD ===
1. "Kanashimi Twilight" (悲しみトワイライト)
2. "Hand Made City"
3. "Kanashimi Twilight" (Instrumental)

=== Limited Edition A DVD ===
1. "Kanashimi Twilight (Another Ver.)"

=== Event V ===
1. "Quiz! Hawaii de Kanashimi Twilight!" (クイズ！ハワイで悲しみトワイライト！)
2. "Kanashimi Twilight (Dance Shot Ver.)"

== Members at time of single ==
- 4th generation: Hitomi Yoshizawa (last single)
- 5th generation: Ai Takahashi, Risa Niigaki
- 6th generation: Miki Fujimoto (last single), Eri Kamei, Sayumi Michishige, Reina Tanaka
- 7th generation: Koharu Kusumi
- 8th generation: Aika Mitsui

== Performances ==
=== In television shows ===
- 2007-04-06 – Music Station
- 2007-04-14 – HaroMoni@
- 2007-04-20 – Music Fighter
- 2007-04-27 – Music Japan (NHK)
- 2007-04-30 – MusiG
- 2007-05-03 – Utaban

=== In concerts ===
- Morning Musume Concert Tour 2007 Spring ~Sexy 8 Beat~

== Oricon rank and sales ==
Daily	Weekly	Sales
2	2	61,322
