= Resonant Blue =

Single by Morning Musume

from the album Platinum 9 Disc
- Released: (Japan) April 16, 2008
- Recorded: 2008
- Genre: J-pop; dance-pop; hip hop; electropop; hip house
- Label: (Japan) Zetima
- Songwriter: Tsunku
- Producer: Tsunku

Morning Musume singles chronology
"Mikan" (2007)	"Resonant Blue" (2008)	"Pepper Keibu" (2008)

Music video
- Resonant Blue on YouTube

"Resonant Blue" (リゾナント ブルー, Rizonanto Burū) is the thirty-sixth single of J-pop girl group Morning Musume. It was released under the Zetima label on April 16, 2008. The Single V DVD of the single was released on April 23, 2008.

== Overview ==
There are three editions. Limited edition A comes along with a bonus DVD, while limited edition B comes with another DVD. The catalog numbers of each limited edition copies are EPCE-5540 and EPCE-5542, respectively. The regular edition has a catalog number EPCE-5544.

With the original, Another ver., a Studio Dance Shot version, a Night Scene version, and a One-cut Dance version, it makes the most PVs ever released for one single. Also notable is the smoky eye make-up used on the members, a daring new look for Morning Musume as they attempt to expand into Asia.

== Track listing ==
All lyrics are written by Tsunku.

=== CD ===
1. "Resonant Blue" (リゾナント ブルー)
2. "Sono Bamen de Bibiccha Ikenai Jan!" (その場面でビビっちゃいけないじゃん！)
3. "Resonant Blue (Instrumental)"

=== Limited A DVD ===
1. "Resonant Blue (Another Ver.)"

=== Limited B DVD ===
1. "Resonant Blue (Lesson Studio Ver.)"

=== Single V ===
1. "Resonant Blue"
2. "Resonant Blue (Night Scene Ver.)"
3. "Making of" (メイキング映像, Meikingu Eizō)

=== Event V ===
1. "Resonant Blue (One Cut Dance Ver.)"
2. "Resonant Blue TV - SPOT (15sec./30sec.)"
3. "Resonant Blue TV - SPOT (Solo Ver.)"
4. "Jacket Photo Making of" (ジャケット撮影メイキング, Jaketto Satsuei Meikingu)
5. "Morning Musume Photo Collection" (モーニング娘。PHOTO COLLECTION)

== Members at the time of single ==
- 5th generation: Ai Takahashi, Risa Niigaki
- 6th generation: Eri Kamei, Sayumi Michishige, Reina Tanaka
- 7th generation: Koharu Kusumi
- 8th generation: Aika Mitsui, Junjun, Linlin

== Personnel ==
- Ai Takahashi – main vocals
- Risa Niigaki – minor vocals
- Eri Kamei – minor vocals
- Sayumi Michishige – minor vocals
- Reina Tanaka – main vocals
- Koharu Kusumi – center vocals
- Aika Mitsui – minor vocals
- Junjun – minor vocals
- Linlin – minor vocals

== Oricon ranks and sales ==
CD single
Mon	Tue	Wed	Thu	Fri	Sat	Sun	Week rank	Sales
–	2	5	3	3	4	10	3	48,086
4	37	36	37	30	33	37	33	4,965
44	50	50	44	43	40	–	51	1,733
–	–	–	–	–	–	–	99	747
Single V
Mon	Tue	Wed	Thu	Fri	Sat	Sun	Week rank	Sales
–	2	5	6	5	5	9	3	–
12	15	19	20	17	–	–	19	–

- Total (CD single) sales: 55,531 (as of May 16, 2008)
- Total (DVD single) sales: —
