= Platinum 9 Disc =

- Front cover of regular edition.

Studio album by Morning Musume
- Released: March 18, 2009 (JP); April 2, 2009 (TW)
- Recorded: 2008
- Genre: J-pop; pop rock; dance-pop; electro
- Length: 56:35
- Label: Zetima (JP); EPCE-5629 (CD+DVD); EPCE-5631 (regular edition); Forward Music (TW); 09-20623 (CD+DVD); 09-20623-1 (regular edition)
- Producer: Tsunku

Morning Musume chronology
Cover You (2008)	Platinum 9 Disc (2009)	Morning Musume All Singles Coupling Collection (2009)

Limited edition with DVD
- Front cover of limited edition.

Singles from Platinum 9 Disc
- 1. "Kanashimi Twilight" Released: April 25, 2007; 2. "Onna ni Sachi Are" Released: July 25, 2007; 3. "Mikan" Released: November 21, 2007; 4. "Resonant Blue" Released: April 16, 2008; 5. "Naichau Kamo" Released: February 18, 2009

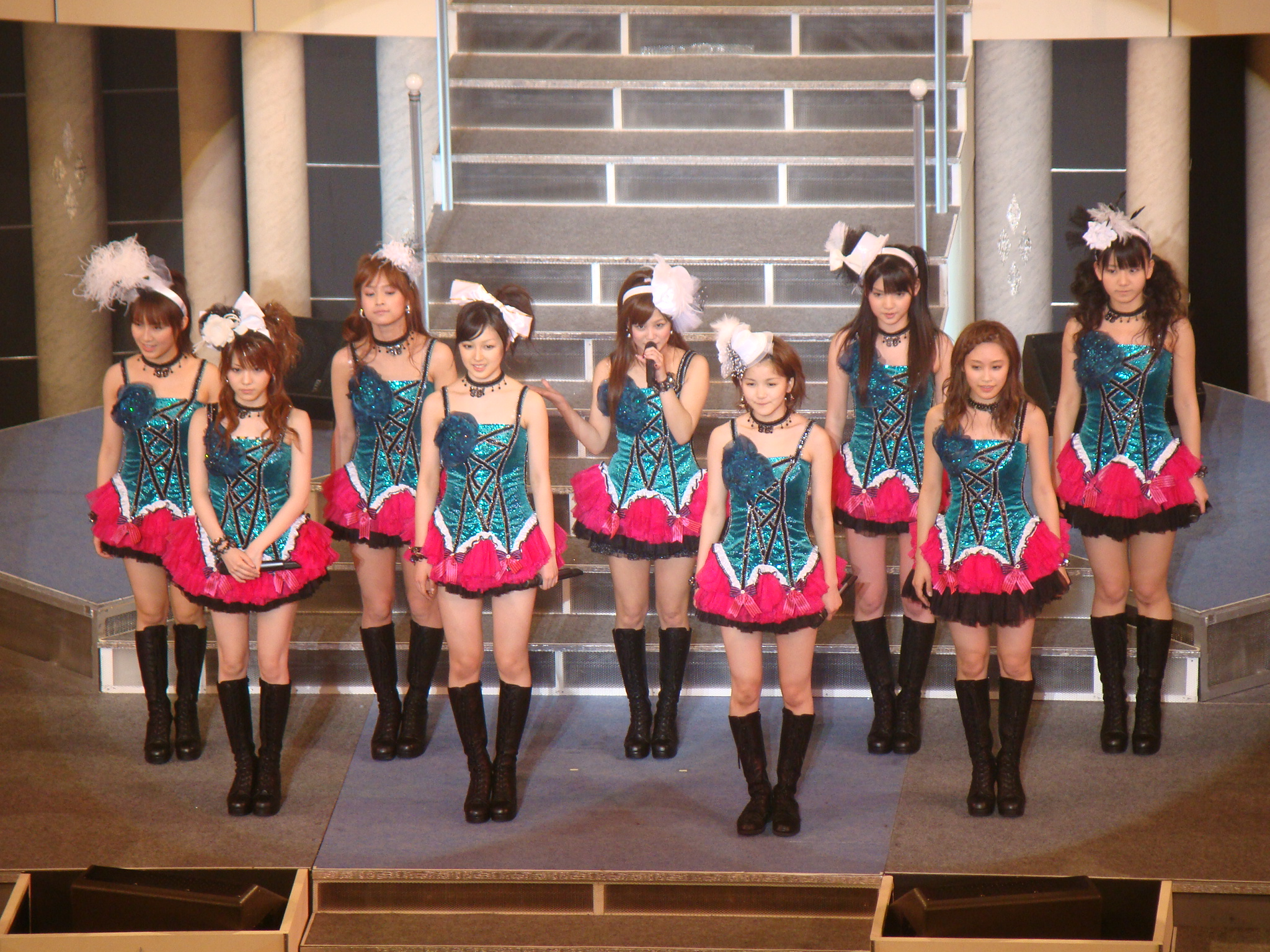
Morning Musume during their Platinum 9 Tour 2009.

Platinum 9 DISC (プラチナ ９ DISC) is Morning Musume's ninth original studio album, released approximately two years after their previous album, Sexy 8 Beat. It was released on March 18, 2009, in both limited (EPCE-5629) and regular (EPCE-5631) editions. The limited edition comes with a bonus DVD. The regular edition include one of ten photo cards, there is one for each member and one for the whole group.

== Track listing ==
All tracks are written by Tsunku.

CD
No.	Title	Length
1.	"SONGS"	4:39
2.	"Resonant Blue" (リゾナント ブルー)	4:52
3.	"Ame no Furanai Hoshi dewa Aisenai Darō?" (雨の降らない星では愛せないだろう? ""We Can't Love Each Other On a Planet Where No Rain Falls, Can We?")	4:17
4.	"Take off is now!" (Sung by Ai Takahashi, Risa Niigaki, and Reina Tanaka)	4:14
5.	"Naichau Kamo" (泣いちゃうかも "I Might Cry")	4:35
6.	"Watashi no Miryoku ni Kizukanai Donkan na Hito" (私の魅力に 気付かない鈍感な人 "The Insensitive Person Who Didn't Notice My Charm" Sung by Aika Mitsui)	4:21
7.	"Guru Guru Jump" (グルグルJump "Round and Round Jump" Sung by Koharu Kusumi, Junjun, and Linlin)	3:54
8.	"Mikan" (みかん)	4:27
9.	"Jōnetsu no Kisu o Hitotsu" (情熱のキスを一つ "One Passionate Kiss" Sung by Ai Takahashi, Risa Niigaki, and Reina Tanaka)	4:33
10.	"It's You" (Sung by Sayumi Michishige)	3:44
11.	"Onna ni Sachi Are" (女に 幸あれ "Fortune to Women")	4:15
12.	"Kataomoi no Owari ni" (片思いの終わりに "At the End of an Unrequited Love" Sung by Eri Kamei)	4:51
13.	"Kanashimi Twilight" (悲しみトワイライト "Sorrowful Twilight")	3:45

Limited Edition DVD
No.	Title	Length
1.	"Naichau Kamo (featuring Ai Takahashi Ver.)" (泣いちゃうかも(featuring 高橋愛 Ver.))
2.	"Naichau Kamo (featuring Risa Niigaki Ver.)" (新垣里沙)
3.	"Naichau Kamo (featuring Eri Kamei Ver.)" (亀井絵里)
4.	"Naichau Kamo (featuring Sayumi Michishige Ver.)" (道重さゆみ)
5.	"Naichau Kamo (featuring Reina Tanaka Ver.)" (田中れいな)
6.	"Naichau Kamo (featuring Koharu Kusumi Ver.)" (久住小春)
7.	"Naichau Kamo (featuring Aika Mitsui Ver.)" (光井愛佳)
8.	"Naichau Kamo (featuring Junjun Ver.)" (ジュンジュン)
9.	"Naichau Kamo (featuring Linlin Ver.)" (リンリン)
10.	"Naichau Kamo (from "Hello! Project 2009 Winter Wonderful Hearts Kōen ~Kakumei Gannen~")" (... 「Hello! Project 2009 Winter ワンダフルハーツ公演～革命元年～」より)
11.	"Renai Revolution 21 (from "Hello! Project 2009 Winter Wonderful Hearts Kōen ~Kakumei Gannen~")" (恋愛レボリューション21 ...)

== Featured lineup ==
- 4th generation: Hitomi Yoshizawa (uncredited in Track 13)
- 5th generation: Ai Takahashi, Risa Niigaki
- 6th generation: Eri Kamei, Sayumi Michishige, Reina Tanaka, Miki Fujimoto (uncredited in Track 13)
- 7th generation: Koharu Kusumi
- 8th generation: Aika Mitsui, Junjun, Linlin

== Personnel ==
- Lyrics, Composition: Tsunku
- Arrangement: Nao Tanaka (tracks 1, 4, 10), Hideyuki "Daichi" Suzuki (2, 8, 9), Koichi Yuasa (3, 6), Kaoru Okubo (5, 7), Kōtarō Egami (11, 12), Jun Yamazaki (13)
- Tenor Saxophone: Yoshinari Takejō (2)
- Saxophone: Akio Suzuki (11)
- Guitar: Koji Kamata (2, 3, 4, 5, 6, 7, 8, 9, 10, 11)
- Chorus: Chino (2, 3, 5, 11), Hiroaki Takeuchi (3), Atsuko Inaba (12)

== Oricon ranks and sales ==
Chart	Position	Sales
Daily	10	19,143
Weekly	13	19,143
