= Mikan (song) =

Single by Morning Musume

from the album Platinum 9 Disc
- Released: November 21, 2007 (Japan)
- Recorded: 2007
- Genre: Japanese pop; pop rock; bubblegum pop; electropop
- Length: 12:08
- Label: Zetima (Japan)
- Songwriter: Tsunku
- Producer: Tsunku

Morning Musume singles chronology
"Onna ni Sachi Are" (2007)	"Mikan" (2007)	"Resonant Blue" (2008)

Music video
- Mikan on YouTube

"Mikan" (みかん; "Mandarin Orange") is the thirty-fifth single of Japanese female idol group Morning Musume. The song's title was chosen in accordance to the habit of eating mandarin oranges while sitting by a kotatsu, as a representation of each member's childhood memories. Mikan's Promotional video extends this concept further, by showing photographs of the members when they were children. It was released on November 21, 2007.

Like its predecessor, there are three editions. Limited edition A is accompanied by a bonus DVD, while a 40-page booklet is available in limited edition B enclosed in a special package. The catalog numbers of each limited edition copies are EPCE-5514 and EPCE-5515, respectively. The regular edition has a catalog number EPCE-5517. The limited and first press of the regular comes with one of ten photo cards, there is one for each member and one for the group.

== Track listing ==
All lyrics are written by Tsunku.

=== CD ===
All tracks are written by Tsunku.

CD
No.	Title	Arranged by	Length
1.	"Mikan" (みかん, "Mandarin Orange")	Hideyuki "Daichi" Suzuki	4:27
2.	""Bon Kyu! Bon Kyu! Bomb Girl" (ボン キュッ！ボン キュッ！BOMB GIRL)	Shunsuke Suzuki	3:16
3.	"Mikan (Instrumental)"		4:25

DVD
No.	Title	Length
1.	"Mikan (Close-up Ver.)"

== Members ==
- 5th generation: Ai Takahashi, Risa Niigaki
- 6th generation: Eri Kamei, Sayumi Michishige, Reina Tanaka
- 7th generation: Koharu Kusumi
- 8th generation: Aika Mitsui, Junjun, Linlin

== Personnel ==
- Ai Takahashi – main vocals, chorus
- Risa Niigaki – center vocal, chorus
- Eri Kamei – center vocal
- Sayumi Michishige – center vocal
- Reina Tanaka – main vocals
- Koharu Kusumi – center vocal
- Aika Mitsui – center vocal
- Junjun – minor vocal
- Linlin – minor vocal

=== Mikan ===
- Hideyuki "Daichi" Suzuki (鈴木Daichi秀行) – programming, guitar
- Kōji Kamata (鎌田浩二) – guitar

=== Bon Kyu! Bon Kyu! Bomb Girl ===
- Shunsuke Suzuki (鈴木俊介) – programming, guitar
- Yasui Sano – drums
- Katsuhiro Mafune – bass
- Masanori Suzuki – trumpet
- Yoshinari Takegami – alto sax, tenor sax, baritone sax

== Oricon ranks and sales ==
Daily	Weekly	Sales
5	6	38,667
