= Naichau Kamo =

- Regular edition cover

Single by Morning Musume

from the album Platinum 9 Disc
- Released: February 18, 2009
- Recorded: 2009
- Genre: J-pop; R&B; dance-pop; electropop
- Length: 14:00
- Label: Zetima
- Songwriter(s): Tsunku
- Producer(s): Tsunku

Morning Musume singles chronology
"Pepper Keibu" (2008)	"Naichau Kamo" (2009)	"Shōganai Yume Oibito" (2009)

Music video
- Naichau Kamo on YouTube

"Naichau Kamo" (泣いちゃうかも, "I Might Cry") is the thirty-eighth single of J-pop group Morning Musume. It was released under the Zetima label on February 16, 2009, achieving a weekly rank of 3 on the Oricon singles chart. The Single V DVD of the single was released on February 25, 2009. This was the 26th single to feature Ai Takahashi and Risa Niigaki. This tied them with 1st generation member Kaori Iida for the most singles featured in.

The CD single was released in three editions: one regular edition and two limited editions, each having different cover art. Limited edition A includes a DVD, while limited edition B includes a different DVD.

== Track listing ==
All tracks are written and composed by Tsunku and arranged by Kaoru Okubo.

=== CD ===
1. "Naichau Kamo" (泣いちゃうかも, "I Might Cry") – 4:35
2. "Yowamushi" (弱虫, "Coward") – 4:51
3. "Naichau Kamo" (Instrumental) – 4:34

=== Limited Edition A DVD ===
1. "Naichau Kamo (Another Ver.)"

=== Limited Edition B DVD ===
1. "Naichau Kamo (Close-up Ver.)"

=== Single V DVD ===
1. "Naichau Kamo"
2. "Naichau Kamo (Dance Shot ver.)"
3. "Making Of" (メイキング映像)

=== Event V ===
1. "Naichau Kamo (Ai Takahashi Close-up Ver.)" (泣いちゃうかも(高橋愛Close-up Ver.))
2. "Naichau Kamo (Risa Niigaki Close-up Ver.)" (泣いちゃうかも(新垣里沙Close-up Ver.))
3. "Naichau Kamo (Eri Kamei Close-up Ver.)" (泣いちゃうかも(亀井絵里Close-up Ver.))
4. "Naichau Kamo (Sayumi Michishige Close-up Ver.)" (泣いちゃうかも(道重さゆみClose-up Ver.))
5. "Naichau Kamo (Reina Tanaka Close-up Ver.)" (泣いちゃうかも(田中れいなClose-up Ver.))
6. "Naichau Kamo (Koharu Kusumi Close-up Ver.)" (泣いちゃうかも(久住小春Close-up Ver.))
7. "Naichau Kamo (Aika Mitsui Close-up Ver.)" (泣いちゃうかも(光井愛佳Close-up Ver.))
8. "Naichau Kamo (Junjun Close-up Ver.)" (泣いちゃうかも(ジュンジュンClose-up Ver.))
9. "Naichau Kamo (Linlin Close-up Ver.)" (泣いちゃうかも(リンリンClose-up Ver.))

== Members at the time of single ==
- 5th generation: Ai Takahashi, Risa Niigaki
- 6th generation: Eri Kamei, Sayumi Michishige, Reina Tanaka
- 7th generation: Koharu Kusumi
- 8th generation: Aika Mitsui, Junjun, Linlin

== Personnel ==
- Ai Takahashi – main vocals, chorus
- Risa Niigaki – center vocal, chorus
- Eri Kamei – center vocals
- Sayumi Michishige – center vocals
- Reina Tanaka – main vocals
- Koharu Kusumi – minor vocals
- Aika Mitsui – minor vocals
- Junjun – minor vocals
- Linlin – minor vocals

== Oricon ranks and sales ==
Daily	Weekly	Sales
2	3	50,313
