= Onna ni Sachi Are =

Single by Morning Musume

from the album Platinum 9 Disc
- Released: July 25, 2007 (CD); August 1, 2007 (Single V); August 3, 2007 (CD)
- Recorded: 2007
- Genre: J-pop; beatmania; dance; electropop; hip house
- Length: 12:38 (CD)
- Label: Zetima; EPCE-5483~4 (CD+DVD); EPCE-5485 (CD+Photobook); EPCE-5486 (regular edition); EPBE-5255 (Single V); Forward Music; 07-20506 (CD+DVD); 07-20506-1 (CD+Photobook); 07-20506-2 (regular edition)
- Songwriter: Tsunku
- Producer: Tsunku

Morning Musume singles chronology
"Kanashimi Twilight" (2007)	"Onna ni Sachi Are" (2007)	"Mikan" (2007)

Music video
- "Onna ni Sachi Are" on YouTube

"Onna ni Sachi Are" (女に幸あれ; "Good Luck, Girls") is the thirty-fourth single of J-pop idol group Morning Musume and the first to feature eighth generation members Junjun and Linlin. It was released on July 25, 2007 and its accompanying Single V on August 1.

The title song's chorus melody interpolates a theme from the first movement of Robert Schumann's Piano Concerto in A Minor, Op. 54.

Like its predecessor, the single was released in three editions. Limited Edition A contained a bonus DVD, while a 40-page photo booklet came with limited edition B, enclosed in a special package. The catalog numbers of each limited edition are EPCE-5483-4 and EPCE-5485, respectively. The regular edition has the catalog number EPCE-5486. The first press of all editions contained a serial-number card for a draw to win tickets to the release event.

== Track listings ==
All lyrics by Tsunku.

=== CD ===
1. "Onna ni Sachi Are" (女に 幸あれ, Good Luck, Girls)
2. "Please! Jiyū no Tobira" (Please!自由の扉, Please! Freedom's Door)
3. "Onna ni Sachi Are" (Instrumental)

=== Limited Edition DVD ===
1. "Onna ni Sachi Are (Dance Shot Ver.)"

=== Single V DVD ===
1. "Onna ni Sachi Are"
2. "Onna ni Sachi Are (Close-up Ver.)"
3. "Making Of" (メイキング映像)

== Members at time of single ==
- 5th generation: Ai Takahashi, Risa Niigaki
- 6th generation: Eri Kamei, Sayumi Michishige, Reina Tanaka
- 7th generation: Koharu Kusumi
- 8th generation: Aika Mitsui, Junjun (debut), Linlin (debut)

== Personnel ==
- Ai Takahashi – main vocals, chorus
- Risa Niigaki – center vocals, chorus
- Eri Kamei – center vocals
- Sayumi Michishige – minor vocals
- Reina Tanaka – main vocals
- Koharu Kusumi – center vocals
- Aika Mitsui – center vocals
- Junjun – minor vocals
- Linlin – minor vocals

=== Onna ni Sachi Are ===
- Chino – chorus
- Kōtarō Egami (江上浩太郎) – arranger, programming
- Kōji Kamata (鎌田浩二) – guitar

=== Please! Jiyū no Tobira ===
- Kōichi Yuasa (湯浅公一) – arranger, programming
- Kōji Kamata (鎌田浩二) – guitar

== Oricon ranks and sales ==
Format	Daily	Weekly	Sales
CD single	1	2	50,812
Single V	1	1	10,107
