= Athena & Robikerottsu =

Japanese girl group

Athena & Robikerottsu (アテナ&ロビケロッツ, "Athena and Robocarrots") was a Hello! Project unit consisting of Niigaki Risa, Mitsui Aika, Nakajima Saki, and Okai Chisato.

== Info ==
This unit was formed in 2007 for the anime Robby and Kerobby, in which Niigaki voices a character.

In this group's original line up Tsuji Nozomi was supposed to be leader, but because of her maternity leave, Niigaki Risa joined the group instead.

The group disbanded in 2008.

== Members ==
- Niigaki Risa (新垣里沙; L)
- Mitsui Aika (光井愛佳)
- Nakajima Saki (中島早貴)
- Okai Chisato (岡井千聖)

== Discography ==
=== Singles ===
| # | Title | Release date | 1st Week Sales | Total Sales | Top Rank |
|---|---|---|---|---|---|
| 1 | Shouri no BIG WAVE!!! (勝利のBIG WAVE!!!) | 2007.11.14 | 4,461 | 5,913 | #31 |
| 2 | Seishun! LOVE Lunch (青春！LOVE ランチ) | 2008.02.13 | 4,753 | 6,731 | #25 |

=== Album Compilations ===
- [2008.12.10] Hello! Project - Petit Best 9 (#10 Seishun! LOVE Lunch)
- [2008.12.10] Hello! Project - Hello! Project Special Unit Mega Best (#14 Shouri no BIG WAVE!!!)

== Total Sales Count ==
| Year | The Year Sales | Total Sales |
|---|---|---|
| 2007 | 5,913 | 5,913 |
| 2008 | 6,731 | 12,644 |
