= Elegies (group) =

Japanese musical group

- Elegies, 1 of the 3 Hello! Project shuffle units for 2005; L-R: Ayumi Shibata, Ai Takahashi, Reina Tanaka and Mai Satoda.

Background information
- Genre: Japanese Pop
- Years active: 2005
- Label: zetima
- Past members: Mai Satoda; Ayumi Shibata; Ai Takahashi; Reina Tanaka

Elegies (エレジーズ, erejiizu) is the Hello! Project 2005 shuffle group consisting of Ai Takahashi and Reina Tanaka of Morning Musume, along with Melon Kinenbi's Ayumi Shibata and Country Musume's Mai Satoda. The name comes from the word elegy. They released the single "Like the Impressionist Renoir (印象派 ルノアールのように, inshōha runoaaru no yō ni)" on June 22, 2005.
