= Haromoni =

Japanese variety television show

- Genre: Variety
- Directed by: 陳賛収; Kōzō Yamada; Hiroko Tsuyuki; Sato B
- Presented by: TV Tokyo
- Starring: Morning Musume
- Country of origin: Japan
- Original language: Japanese
- No. of episodes: 76

Production
- Producer: Mitsuharu Seki
- Production location: Tokyo, Japan
- Cinematography: Hiroyuki Ikeda
- Editor: Yūsuke Kanno
- Camera setup: Multi-camera
- Running time: 23 minutes

Original release
- Release: April 8, 2007 – September 28, 2008

Related
- Hello! Morning (2000–2007); Hello! Morning, Futarigoto, Musume Dokyu!

Haromoni (ハロモニ@) was the sequel to the long-running Japanese variety show Hello! Morning, which first aired on April 8, 2007, on TV Tokyo and later throughout the country. The show was recorded in HD and starred Morning Musume members. Each member represented different animals living under the young and mildly despotic ruler of the fictional Kingdom of Haromoni, King Akachin (あかちん国王), whose name derives from the Japanese word for "baby" (赤ちゃん, akachan).

The final episode aired on September 28, 2008.

== Concept ==
Haromoni marked a departure from its predecessor and related Hello! Project productions in that it was shot exclusively outdoors and was composed of a series of connected segments. In the first ten episodes, the show followed the form of a relatively cohesive narrative, detailing the weekly accomplishment of a specific task. The tasks generally consisted of delivering a given piece of hardware used in commerce and industry on behalf of King Akachin.

Thereafter, the show focused primarily on several distinct characters, including Lying Queen (うそつQUEEN), Little King (チビッコKING), Hit Jack (ヒットの現場JACK) and Child Gourmet Joker (お子さまグルメJOKER). Morning Musume members were usually split into two groups who then challenged other Japanese celebrities to compete in a series of one or more games for each character.

In the episode 'Lying Queen', for example, four Musume members faced off against a celebrity artist in a game to determine which of them was lying about a given subject (past gastronomic experiences, among others). At one point, a third group, consisting of Koharu Kusumi and Aika Mitsui, visited Chinese restaurants and events related to China in order to learn more about Eighth Generation members Junjun and Linlin's home country.

Other challenges included creating an exclusive character design for the Kirarin Revolution anime series. Members were asked to draw the design for Tsukishima Kirari's pet cat Nā-san's antagonist. Sayumi Michishige's youma-inspired design was chosen from the submitted works.

== Segments ==
From the January 27, 2008 episode until the April 27, 2008 episode, Haromoni@ had consisted of only a "MouTube" segment and occasionally a studio performance.

- Lying Queen (2007-07-29 – 2007-11-25)
- Little King (2007-07-29 – 2007-12-09): This segment features a child or children who have special talents. The children show their talents and often challenge Morning Musume in the talent, with Morning Musume being required to complete much simpler tasks. The winner of the challenge is rewarded with a gourmet dessert.
- Hit Jack (2007-08-05 – 2007-09-02)
- Child Gourmet Joker (2007-09-30 – 2007-10-28)
- Collab Musume (2007-10-07 – 2007-12-09)
- Equal Viking (2007-11-18 – 2008-01-20): Morning Musume members and several guests are seated around a circular table upon which certain dishes are placed. The girls and guests must each take a certain amount of food, until it is all gone. Each person's plate is then weighted to meet a certain quota. If the weight does not land within the required amount, the food is taken from them.
- MouTube (2008-01-13 – 2008-09-28): This segment features videos from fans around the world that submitted their videos to Morning Musume. It also features Memory Battles, GakiKame Theater and the Morning Musume members portraying different roles doing different things. The list of portrayals and performances are as follows:

- Takahashi Ai - Known for portraying Doi Takako (a prominent Japanese politician from 1980 until 2005). She mimics her voice and tries to promote things and places.
- Niigaki Risa - GakiKame Segment, performing hard and impossible tasks, usually requiring multiple attempts to complete. Her most notable task was trying to throw a golf ball into a hole with 302 attempts. Also known for her Korean performances, where she portrays other comedians doing parodies.
- Michishige Sayumi - As Princess WaiWai, a magician performing Magic Tricks
- Kamei Eri - GakiKame Segment, performing hard and impossible tasks, usually requiring multiple attempts to complete. Her most notable task was trying to throw a book to fit exactly into the slot with 297 attempts.
- Tanaka Reina - As Detective Tanaka, a detective that makes people confess their crimes using weird methods.
- Kusumi Koharu - Atereko Musume (Voice-Over Musume), performing voice over for old videos of Morning Musume members, making it as funny as possible.
- Mitsui Aika - Known for her incredible memory and challenging Nandemo Kioku Show. No matter how difficult it is, she is able to remember everything thrown to her.
- JunJun - AirOO (Air Maru Maru) segment. Making the other members guess what she is portraying without any props and only hand actions.
- LinLin - Chuugoku Fushigi News (China Unbelievable News). As a Chinese News Reporter, she would report weird and unbelievable news from China.
