= Aika Mitsui =

Japanese singer, actress and dancer

Aika Mitsui 光井愛佳
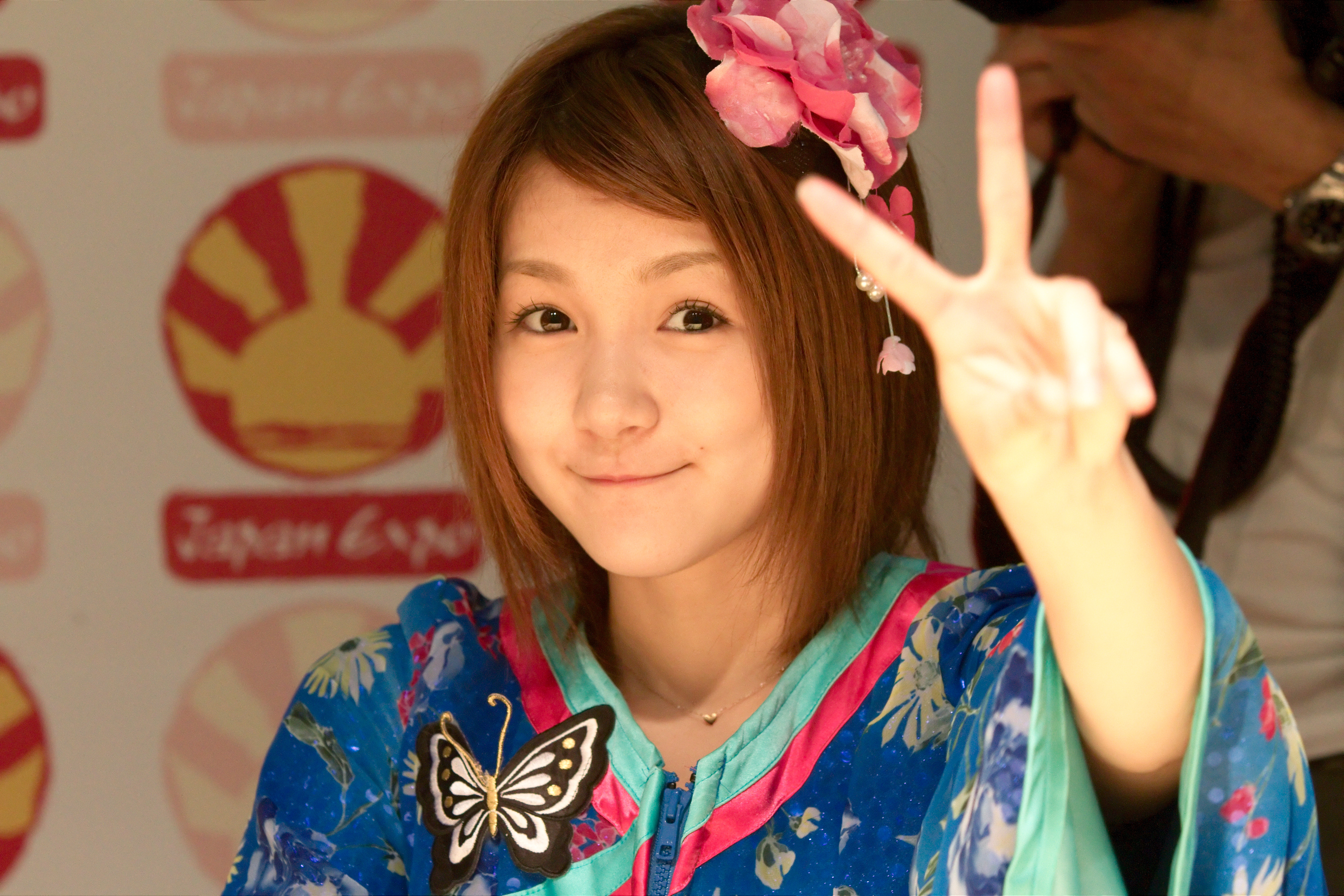
- Mitsui at the Japan Expo in Paris, 2010

Background information
- Also known as: Mittsī
- Born: 光井 愛佳 (Mitsui Aika); January 12, 1993 (age 33); Ōtsu, Shiga, Japan
- Occupations: Singer; Actress; Dancer; Rapper
- Musical career
- Genre: J-pop
- Instrument: Vocals
- Years active: 2006-2013, 2015-2018
- Label: Zetima

Aika Mitsui (光井 愛佳, Mitsui Aika; born January 12, 1993, in Ōtsu, Shiga, Japan) is a Japanese singer. She was a member of Hello! Project and a former member of the J-pop group Morning Musume, joining as a member of the eighth generation from the audition in Japan during December 2006. Mitsui's audition process was documented during the late 2006 episodes of Hello! Morning. She performed Ayumi Hamasaki's "Blue Bird" in round one of her audition and Morning Musume's "Furusato" and "Osaka Koi no Uta" in rounds two and three. She graduated from Morning Musume on May 18, 2012. She retired from the entertainment industry to pursue culinary studies in New Zealand on November 3, 2018.

== Biography ==
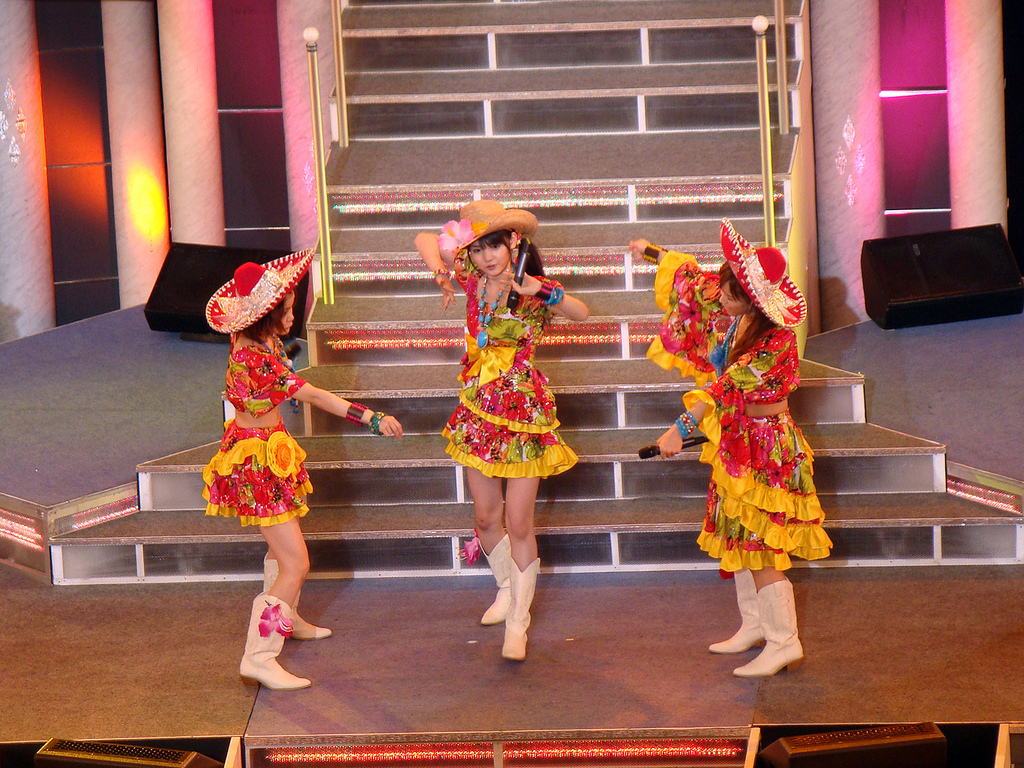
Mitsui (left), Sayumi Michishige (center), and Eri Kamei performing at Morning Musume's Platinum 9 Disc concert tour in May 2009.

=== 2006-2012 (Morning Musume) ===
On December 10, 2006, she alone out of five (originally six, but Ayami Masuda dropped out) audition finalists was chosen to join Morning Musume.

An article published on December 11, 2006, revealed that Mitsui wouldn't be present in the 57th edition of Kōhaku Uta Gassen but would instead be featured in the group's 32nd single, Egao Yes Nude, which was released on February 14, 2007, following her first public appearance on the last round of the Hello! Project Winter 2007 Tours, ~Shūgetsu 10th Anniversary~ (～集結! 10th Anniversary～), which took place between January 27, 2007, and January 28, 2007, at Saitama Super Arena. She also took part in Morning Musume's 2007 Spring Tour ~Sexy 8 Beat~.

One week after the results of Happy 8 Ki Audition were announced, Mitsui was featured in a small segment of Hello! Morning which included footage from a press conference given on the eleventh. During the conference, Mitsui revealed her goal of captivating the public by means of her cheerful personality and smile, emulating fellow member Koharu Kusumi, whom she admires and strives to equal or surpass.

Following her concert debut, Mitsui was also featured in a small segment of the Oha Suta morning programme entitled I want to express my gratitude ("ありがとうを伝えたい", Arigatō o tsutaetai), which purports to show the viewers a fictionalized account of the events following her first concert appearances, dealing with Mitsui's sadness over the fact she had to part with her former classmates due to her becoming an idol.

Her first appearance at a non-Hello! Project related event took place on February 8, 2007, on Utaban, as part of Morning Musume.

In October 2007, Mitsui was placed in the unit Athena & Robikerottsu along with fellow Morning Musume member Risa Niigaki, as well as Saki Nakajima and Chisato Okai of Cute.

On the November 25, 2007 episode of Haromoni@, Mitsui got the voice role of Gurossan in the anime Kirarin Revolution starring Kirari Tsukishima, voiced by Koharu Kusumi.

On April 6, 2008, Hello! Project announced that Mitsui would not be able to perform in the 2008 spring tour due to her being in very poor health. Later in the week, it was discovered that she had suffered from acute appendicitis, and would be out of action for two more weeks.

Between December 15, 2010 (the graduation of Linlin) and January 2, 2011 (the addition of Mizuki Fukumura, Erina Ikuta, Riho Sayashi and Kanon Suzuki), Mitsui was the only member of Morning Musume under the age of 20. She was injured in the Spring 2011 during the last few dates of Morning Musume's Fantasy DX concert tour. She suffered a fracture to her ankle which put her out of concert action. She continued to participate in live performances sitting on a stool. Mid 2011 it was announced that her injury had become worse. She was ordered to bed rest by the doctor. She took part in Morning Musume's 47th Single, but did not appear in the dance shot accompanying the single. Aika did not participate in the 2011 Morning Musume fall concert until the final day on September 30, when Ai Takahashi graduated from the group. However, she was featured in all of the concert goods that were released.

On May 4, 2012, Mitsui announced that she would graduate from Morning Musume along with the current leader, Risa Niigaki, on the 18th of the same month. This was due to her ankle injury which put her on hiatus since spring the previous year. Mitsui was the first to leave the group, but not Hello! Project since the Elder Club graduated in 2009. In October 2012, it was announced that Mitsui would be a member of the new unit GREEN FIELDS alongside Saki Shimizu and Yuka Miyazaki.

=== 2013–present (Post Morning Musume) ===
On March 2 and 3, Mitsui participated in SATOYAMA e Yukou ~Forest For Rest~ along with other Hello! Project and UP-FRONT PROMOTION members. It was announced that Mitsui would "graduate" from Young Town. She was replaced by Iikubo Haruna beginning in April.

Beginning on April 6, Mitsui became a regular on the radio show "ALMA KAMINIITO Sound Map," replacing Ohno Munehiko.

In May, Mitsui starred in a new stageplay called Okujou Wonderland.

From October 12 to 20, Mitsui performed in a play called Nettai Danshi 2 in Zenrosai Hall / Space Zero.

In April 2014, Mitsui went aboard to New Zealand to study English. She would return one year later, upon announcement on her blog that she is writing English-language news and event reports for UP-FRONT LINK, UP-FRONT's international company news service.

On February 25, Mitsui accompanied Morning Musume '16 on their trip to Houston, Texas where they were main guests at Anime Matsuri 2016, which took place from February 26 to 28.

On July 5, she announced that she will be going back to New Zealand to further her English studies again.

On November 5, 2018, it was announced that Mitsui had terminated her contract with J.P. Room.

== Hello Project groups and units ==
- Morning Musume (2006–2012)
- Athena & Robikerottsu
- Guardians 4
- Green Fields (2012–)
