= Li Qinyao =

Chinese actress and singer (born 1988)

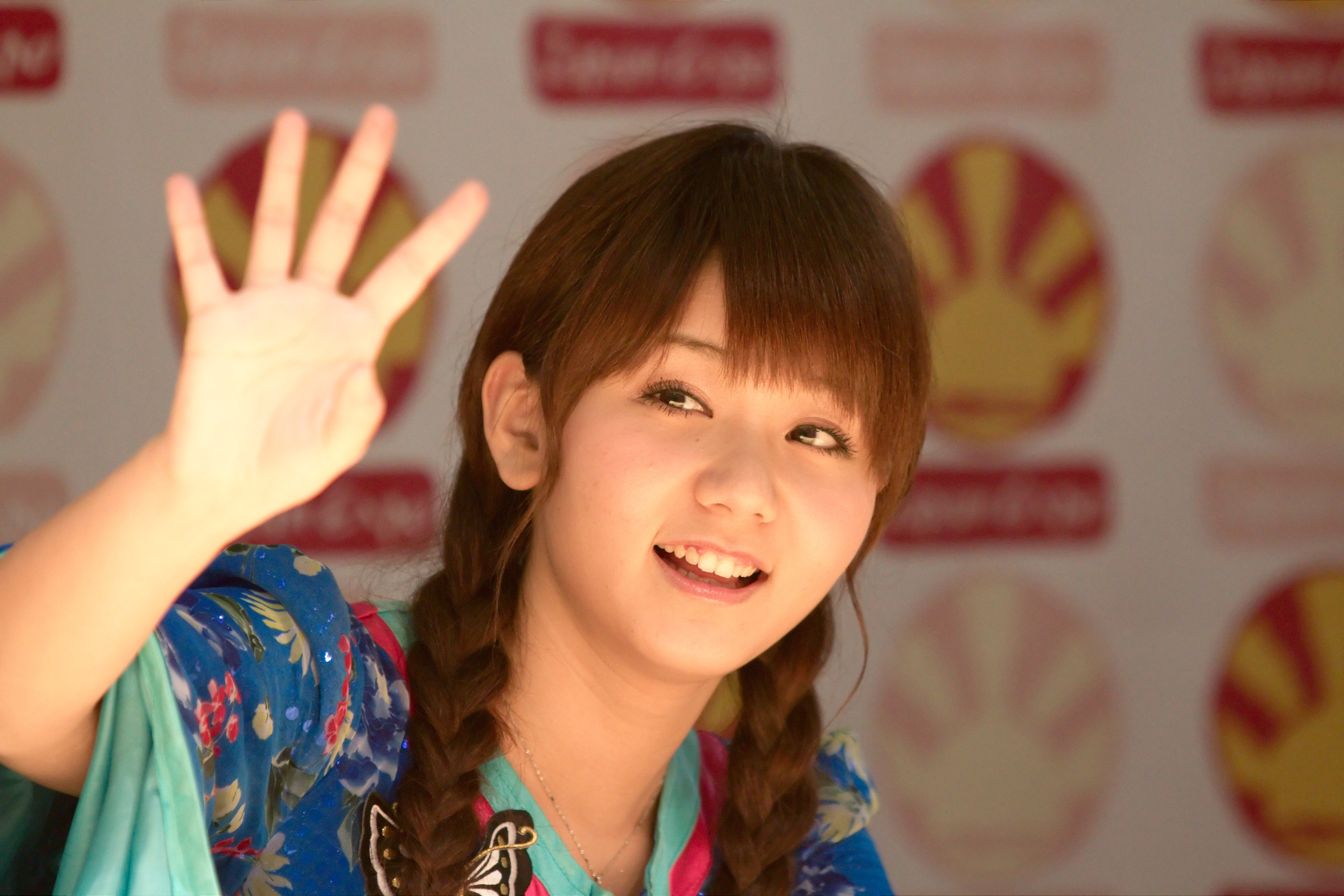
- Chuj at the 2010 Japan Expo, in Paris, France
- Born: Li Chun; January 11, 1988 (age 38) (Note: Li Qinyao has publicly stated that her real birthdate is January 11, 1988. Official records list Li's birthdate as February 11, 1988, which she stated was due to her mother accidentally writing the wrong month on their household registration.); Yueyang, Hunan, China
- Other name: Jun Jun (ジュンジュン)
- Occupations: Actress; singer
- Spouse: Bernard Zheng (m. 2014)
- Children: 1
- Musical career
- Genre: J-pop
- Years active: 2007–present
- Label: Zetima
- Formerly of: Morning Musume; Zoku v-u-den

Li Qinyao
- Traditional Chinese: 李沁謠
- Simplified Chinese: 李沁谣
Transcriptions
Standard Mandarin
- Hanyu Pinyin: Lǐ Qìnyáo

Li Chun
- Traditional Chinese: 李純
- Simplified Chinese: 李纯
Transcriptions
Standard Mandarin
- Hanyu Pinyin: Lǐ Chún

Li Chun (simplified Chinese: 李纯; traditional Chinese: 李純; pinyin: Lǐ Chún; born January 11, 1988), known professionally as Li Qinyao (simplified Chinese: 李沁谣; traditional Chinese: 李沁謠; pinyin: Lǐ Qìnyáo), is a Chinese actress and former singer. From 2007 to 2010, she was a member of the Japanese girl group Morning Musume under the stage name Jun Jun (ジュンジュン).

As an actress, Li has appeared in television and film projects including Moon Embracing the Stars and Eastern Battlefield.

== Career ==
=== 2007-2010: Morning Musume ===
In 2006, Li auditioned for Super Girl, but failed to enter the top 10. Tsunku, who planned on expanding Hello! Project into overseas Asian markets, offered her and the other eliminated Super Girl contestants an opportunity to participate in Morning Musume's Happy 8 Generation Audition in Beijing, China, which was kept secret from the members of Morning Musume themselves. Li accepted in spite of her family's disapproval due to the Japanese-Chinese tensions.

On March 15, 2007, Li was officially announced as an eighth generation member in Morning Musume as a "foreign exchange student" along with Lin Lin. On March 18, 2007, she made her first Japanese television appearance on Hello! Morning, Morning Musume's variety show. Within the same week, she moved to Tokyo, Japan. Li made her first stage appearance took place during Morning Musume leader Hitomi Yoshizawa's graduation concert on May 6, 2007, at Saitama Super Arena. In July 2007, Morning Musume released the single "Onna ni Sachi Are", Li's first song with the group.

In 2009, Li, along with Morning Musume members Sayumi Michishige and Koharu Kusumi and Berryz Kobo member Risako Sugaya, released the song "Sekai wa Futari no Tame ni" as the group Zoku V-U-Den.

During the final show of Hello! Project's 2010 summer tour on August 8, 2010, Li, along with Lin Lin and Eri Kamei, announced they would be leaving Morning Musume after the final show of their fall tour, Morning Musume 2010 Rival Survival. Her final single with the group was "Onna to Otoko no Lullaby Game", which was released on November 17, 2010. Li's final performance with the group took place on December 15, 2010, during which she sang "Furusato" as her graduation song.

=== 2011-present: Return to China ===
In late August 2011, she was announced to be cast in a Chinese school-life film "Love for a Second" and as of early September 2011, she was discovered to be enrolling in the famous Beijing Film Academy, studying Performance Arts.

On May 8, 2015, Li announced through her Weibo account that she would be changing her professional name to "Li Qinyao".

== Personal life ==
On December 26, 2014, Li announced on Weibo that she had married Chinese music producer Bernard Zheng. On May 28, 2020, Li announced on Weibo that she had given birth to a child.

== Filmography ==
=== Television ===
Year	Title	Role	Network	Notes
2007	Hello! Morning	Herself	TV Tokyo	Morning Musume's variety show
2007–2008	Haromoni	Herself	TV Tokyo	Morning Musume's variety show
2009	Bijo Houdan	Herself	TV Tokyo	Hello! Project's variety show
2015	Moon Embracing the Stars	Xia Mingxing	Sichuan TV, Shenzhen TV	Supporting role
2016	Eastern Battlefield	Suya	Jiangsu TV, Hubei TV	Supporting role

=== Film ===
Year	Title	Role	Notes
2013	Silent Witness	Mengmeng's classmate	Minor role; credited as Li Chun
