= Ai Takahashi =

Japanese pop singer and actress (born 1986)

Ai Takahashi 高橋 愛
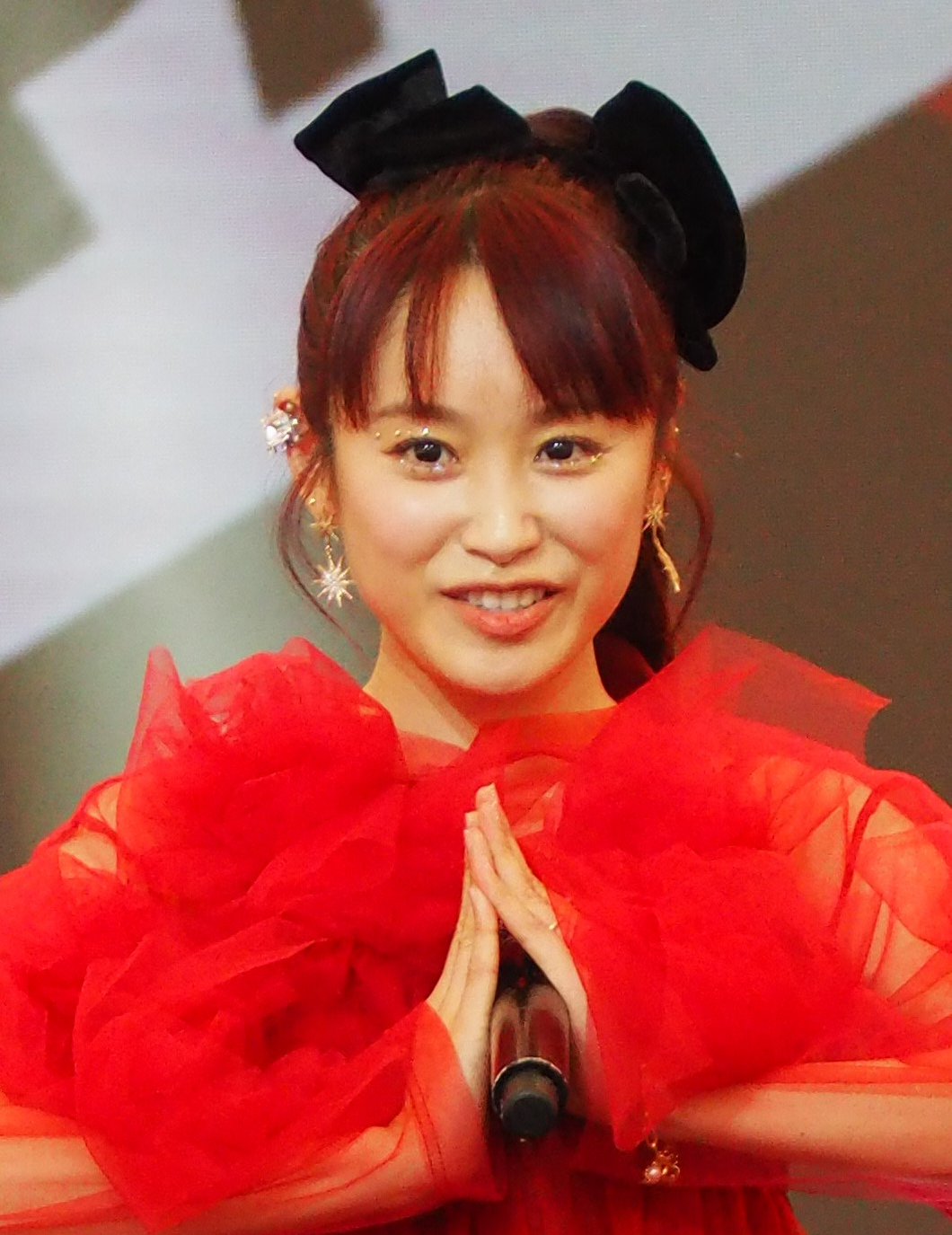
- Takahashi at the Japan Expo in Thailand in 2025

Background information
- Also known as: Ai-chan (愛ちゃん)
- Born: September 14, 1986 (age 40); Sakai, Fukui, Japan
- Occupations: Singer; actress
- Spouse: Koji Abe (m. 2014)
- Musical career
- Genre: J-pop
- Instrument: Vocals
- Years active: 2001–present
- Label: Zetima
- Formerly of: Morning Musume; Mini Moni; Morning Musume Sakuragumi; Happy 7; 7Air; Elegies; High-King; Hello! Project

Signature
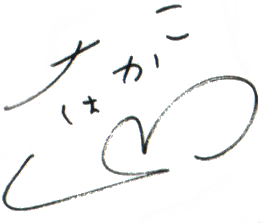

Ai Takahashi (高橋 愛, Takahashi Ai; born September 14, 1986) is a Japanese singer and actress. She joined the girl group Morning Musume as a 5th generation member in 2001 and became one of the group's lead vocalists. She became Morning Musume's leader in 2007, as well as the leader of their musical collective, Hello! Project, in 2009. During her time in Morning Musume, Takahashi was also a member of sub-groups within Hello! Project, such as Mini-Moni, High-King, and several Hello! Project Shuffle Units. In 2011, she graduated from Morning Musume and Hello! Project.

== Biography ==
=== Morning Musume career (2001–2011) ===
In 2001, Ai Takahashi joined the Japanese idol group Morning Musume as part of the group's fifth generation of performers, along with Makoto Ogawa, Asami Konno, and Risa Niigaki. Her audition involved a three-day training camp where participants were expected to learn a new song, a dance routine and a script. Takahashi was one of nine applicants selected out of 25,000 for the camp. Her debut with the group was on their single "Mr. Moonlight: Ai no Big Band", and her first appearance on a Morning Musume full-length release was their fourth studio album, 4th Ikimasshoi!. Her first appearance within a Hello! Project shuffle unit release was on the 2002 single "Shiawase Beam! Suki Suki Beam!" under the group name Happy 7.

In 2003, Takahashi replaced Mari Yaguchi in the Morning Musume spinoff group Mini Moni and debuted in the group's movie Mini Moni ja Movie: Okashi na Daibōken! and its accompanying soundtrack. Later in 2003, she was part of the Morning Musume splinter group Morning Musume Sakuragumi, which performed mainly slower numbers on the group's two EPs, "Hare Ame Nochi Suki" and "Sakura Mankai", and the shuffle group 7Air, an R&B-inspired septet.

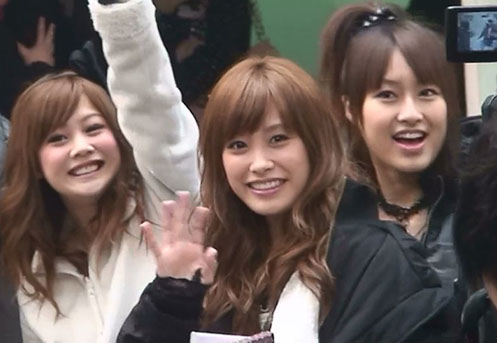
Takahashi (center) in 2009 with fellow Morning Musume members.

Takahashi's vocals became more prominent on the second and final Mini Moni album, Mini Moni Songs 2 (2004), as well as on Morning Musume's singles from their spring 2004 release, "Roman: My Dear Boy". She sang a duet with Tsunku on the cover version of Tsunku and Ayumi Hamasaki's duet "Love: Since 1999" and on his solo album Take1.

In 2005, Morning Musume's first single release of the year, "The Manpower!!!", featured Takahashi in a prominent co-lead-vocal role which she has continued in on subsequent singles. That summer she became part of the 2005 shuffle group Elegies.

In 2006, Takahashi played the lead role, Sapphire, in Ribon no Kishi The Musical which was a collaboration work by Hello! Project and the Japanese all-female theatrical company Takarazuka Revue. The musical was based on Tezuka Osamu's manga and starred v-u-den, Nozomi Tsuji, Aya Matsuura and Natsumi Abe as well as Marcia and Kaoru Ebira of the Takarazuka Revue. On July 2, Takahashi released her first and only solo single to date, "Yume Kara Samete".

Following then-leader Hitomi Yoshizawa's graduation from Morning Musume on May 6, 2007, sub-leader Miki Fujimoto was promoted to leader and Takahashi filled in as the new sub-leader of the group. On June 1, 2007, Fujimoto resigned and Takahashi took over as the new leader.

Takahashi was also captain of the Hello! Project kickball team, Metro Rabbits H.P.

In 2008, Takahashi became a member of Hello Project's new unit High-King, a group created to promote Morning Musume's Cinderella the Musical, in which Takahashi played the title character.

It was announced in July 2008 that Takahashi and fellow Morning Musume member Risa Niigaki would play the 80s J-Pop duo Pink Lady in the TV Drama Hitmaker Aku Yuu Monogatari.

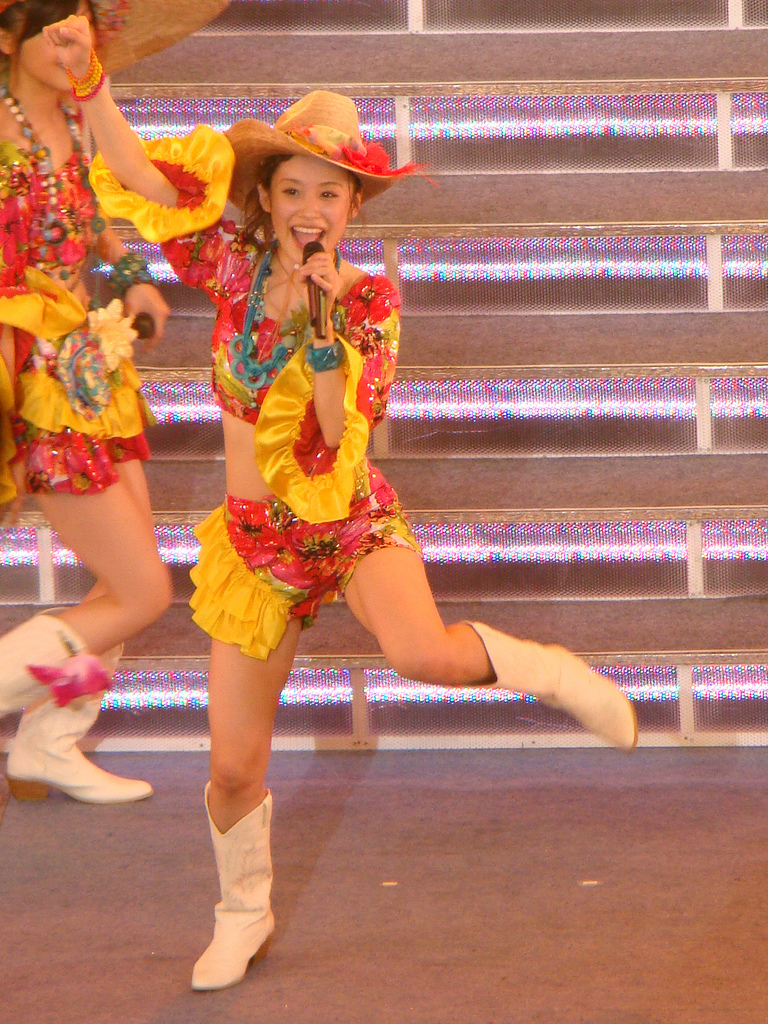
Takahashi performing at Morning Musume's Platinum 9 Disc concert tour in May 2009.

As of January 2009, she and Risa Niigaki had the longest tenures of any member; she was one of only seven members to remain in the group for seven years or more (the others being Kaori Iida, Yoshizawa, Niigaki, Eri Kamei, Sayumi Michishige and Reina Tanaka) and one of two (along with Niigaki) to remain in the group for eight or nine years.

On February 1, 2009, during the "Hello Pro Award '09 ~Elder Club Sotsugyō Kinen Special~" concert held at Yokohama Arena, Yuko Nakazawa passed on her leadership position in Hello! Project to Takahashi.

In December 2009, Takahashi was one of many celebrities to promote the release of Final Fantasy XIII in Japan.

In September 2010, she became the second Morning Musume member to be at least 24 years old and the first to reach that age while in the group (original member Yuko Nakazawa was 24 when the group was formed).

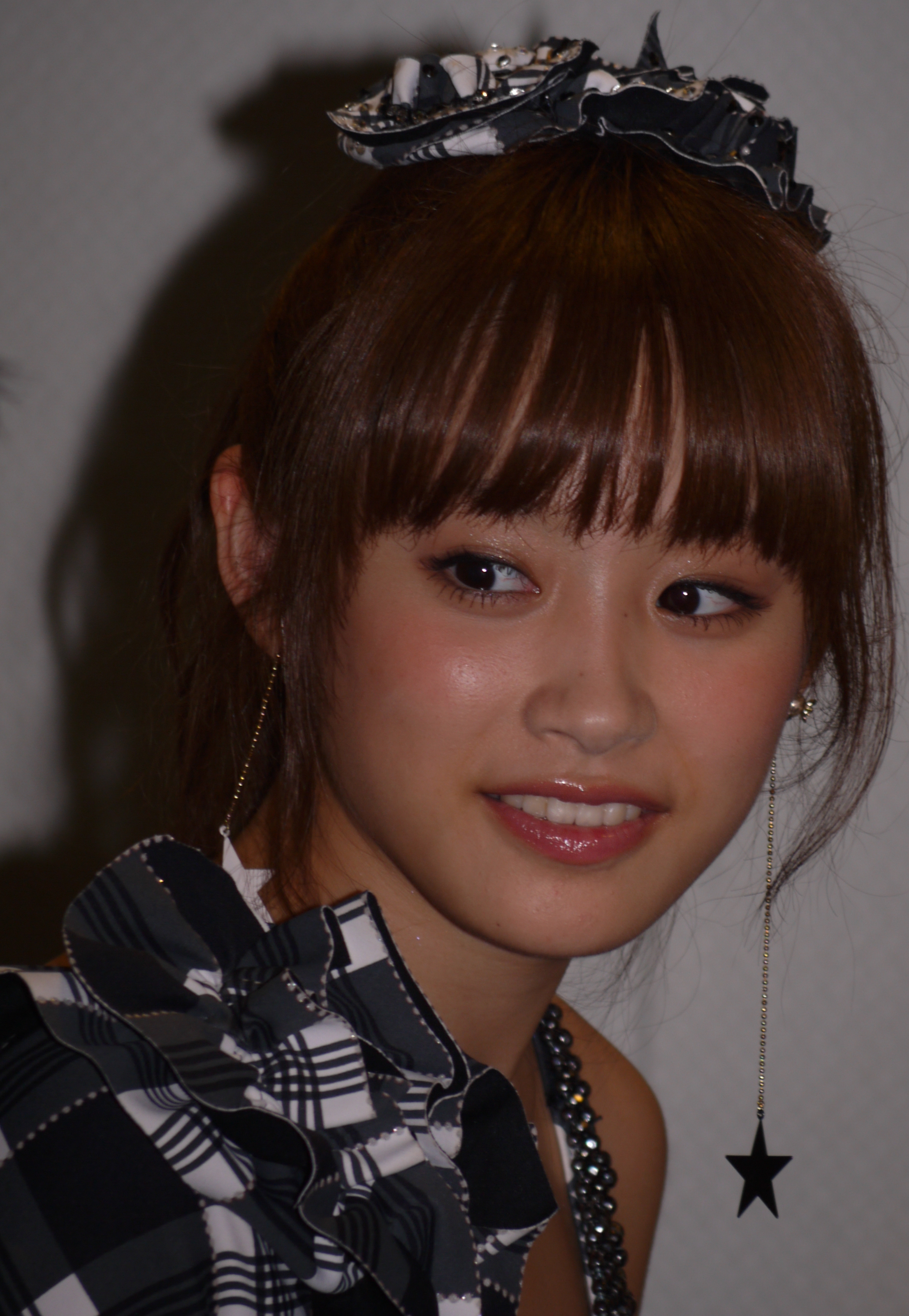
Takahashi at the 11th edition of Japan Expo in 2010 organised at the 'Parc de expositions of Villepinte in Paris.

On January 9, 2011, it was announced that Takahashi would graduate from Morning Musume at the end of the fall tour that year.

Takahashi's last single with Morning Musume, the double A-side "Kono Chikyuu no Heiwa wo Honki de Negatterun dayo!/ Kare to Issho ni Omise ga Shitai" (この地球の平和を本気で願ってるんだよ！/彼と一緒にお店がしたい！), included a B-side solo by Takahashi, "Jishin Motte Yume o Motte Tobitatsu Kara" (自信持って 夢を持って 飛び立つから), and was released on her birthday, September 14.

On September 30, 2011, on the last day of Morning Musume's "Ai Believe" tour, Takahashi graduated from Morning Musume and Hello! Project at the Nippon Budokan and passed her role of leader to Risa Niigaki.

=== Post Morning Musume (2011–present) ===
2011
Her first role after graduation was the lead role of Sarah in the musical Dance of the Vampires at the Imperial Garden Theater. On November 25, it was announced that Takahashi was cast for a stage play titled La Patisserie, which ran from March 3 to March 11 in Tokyo, March 20 in Osaka, and March 22 in Ishikawa.

2012
On May 6, Takahashi announced that she had been cast in the Taiga drama Taira no Kiyomori. She played Tsuneko, the wife of Kiyomori's eldest son. From September 12 to September 23, she starred in a stage play titled High School Uta Gekidan☆Otoko-gumi. It was announced that Takahashi would voice a character in the hit anime series Detective Conan, with her episodes airing in early 2013.

2013
On February 12, Hello! Project Fanclub News announced that Takahashi would star in a stage play titled Moshimo Kokumin ga Shusho o Erandara along with Rika Ishikawa, S/mileage members Ayaka Wada and Kanon Fukuda, and Juice=Juice members Karin Miyamoto and Akari Uemura. The play ran for 11 performances from April 24 to April 30. On March 18, Takahashi appeared in the commercial “Ai to Kumao” to promote the insect repellent Mushuda; it was her first time appearing solo in a commercial. On May 10, Takahashi modeled for the Vanquish Venus fashion magazine. On July 3, it was announced that she would be going to Thailand for Japan Festa 2013 from August 31 to September 1. She held a free mini live and handshake event. On July 16, she announced two live birthday concerts to be held on September 14 (Tokyo) and 16 (Osaka), titled called "Ai Takahashi Birthday Live 2013 ~HELLO♥27~", but the Osaka performance was cancelled due to a typhoon. On July 21, Takahashi held a live solo performance titled "Takahashi Ai Sparkling Live in Yuigahama". On September 10, HMV announced that Takahashi would be releasing her first style book on October 18, titled "AI am I", which would include an interview about her Morning Musume days, as well as her ideas about love. It would also include articles on fashion, hair tips, and makeup. Takahashi became a regular on the new TV drama Jikken Keiji Totori 2, which began airing on October 12. In November, Takahashi was cast as Beth Spencer in the musical Merrily We Roll Along, She also played Julia in The Wedding Singer. From late October to November, Takahashi began filming for the movie Kara-age☆USA, starring in the main role. The movie was filmed in Oita, Japan and in the United States.

2014
On March 17, Takahashi appeared in another commercial for the insect repellent Mushuda, titled "Live." In September, her film Kara-age☆USA was released in theaters. On September 13, Takahashi released her second style book I have AI.

2015
Takahashi attended "Hello Pro Kenshuusei Happyoukai 2015 ~Haru no Koukai Jitsuryoku Shindan Test~" as a judge. In April, it was announced that she had joined a girl group with fellow Morning Musume graduates Yaguchi Mari and Tsuji Nozomi called "Datsumo Musume", under the management of Datsumo Labo, for the promotion of their hair removal services. On July 17, the women's lingerie and clothing retailer PEACH JOHN announced they would be collaborating with Takahashi for the collection "LOVE & PEACH". On September 11, it was announced that Takahashi would be collaborating with fashion brand Haco for the LOVE&PEACE Project 2015, a project that began in the wake of the 9/11 attacks to raise funds to support "a happy future for children around the world" by selling clothing from the project collection. On October 2, Takahashi modeled for a new boot collection by ASBee.

2016
In spring 2016, Takahashi starred in Hoshi Boshi no Yakusoku, Japan's first live-action film made for a Fulldome Cinema, which was screened in her hometown's Fukui City Museum of Natural History Dome Theater.

== Personal life ==
On December 20, 2013, it was announced that Takahashi and Koji Abe, her boyfriend, had engaged. They married on February 14, 2014. On June 2, 2014, they held a wedding ceremony in Hawaii attended by 30 friends and family. Takahashi and Abe held a reception on January 22, 2015, with Morning Musume members Kei Yasuda, Rika Ishikawa, Hitomi Yoshizawa, Makoto Ogawa, Asami Konno, Miki Fujimoto, Mizuki Fukumura, Erina Ikuta, and Riho Sayashi, along with many others, in attendance.

She is the oldest child in her family and has one sister who is two years younger.

Takahashi's cousin, Riku Maeda, is a Japanese rapper and dancer who is a member of the South Korean boy group NCT and it's Japanese sub-unit NCT Wish.

== Discography and releases ==
=== Studio albums ===
#	Title	Release date	Information
1	"Laugh and Peace" (ラフ・アンド・ピース)	2022	Collaborative album with Reina Tanaka & Natsuyaki Miyabi

=== Singles ===
#	Title	Release date	Information
1	"Yume Kara Samete" (夢から醒めて)	2006	Only released for digital purchase and download; later released as part of the Petit Best 7 compilation CD
2	"HAPPY! Ippuku Maru" (HAPPY!いっぷくまる)	2012	Only released for digital purchase and download; the song was recorded for Fukui TV's mascot, Ippuku Maru.
3	"Oyoge! Taiyaki-kun" (およげ！たいやきくん)	2021	Only released for digital purchase and download; with Reina Tanaka & Natsuyaki Miyabi; cover of Masato Shimon's 1971 song; later released as part of the Laugh and Peace collaborative CD

=== Photo and fashion books ===
#	Romaji Japanese English	Title	Release date	Publisher ISBN	Description
–	5: Morning Musume 5 Ki Member Shashinshū; 5 モーニング娘。5期メンバー写真集; 5: Morning Musume 5th Generation Members Photobook		August 13, 2002	Wani Books; ISBN 4-8470-2721-3	Photobook starring all of the 5th generation members.
1	Takahashi Ai: Solo Shashinshū "Takahashi Ai Shashinshū"; 高橋愛 ソロ写真集「高橋愛写真集」; Ai Takahashi: Solo Photobook "Ai Takahashi Photobook"		December 9, 2002	Wani Books; ISBN 4-8470-2741-8	First solo photobook.
2	Alo Hello! Takahashi Ai; アロハロ!高橋愛		December 17, 2003	Kadokawa Shoten; ISBN 4-04-894253-0	Second solo photobook.
3	Takahashi Ai Shashinshū "Wataame"; 高橋愛写真集 わたあめ; Ai Takahashi Photobook "Cotton Candy"		May 27, 2004	Wani Books; ISBN 4-8470-2806-6	Third solo photobook.
4	Takahashi Ai Shashinshū "Ai Gokoro"; 高橋愛写真集 愛ごころ		June 25, 2005	Wani Books; ISBN 4-8470-2870-8	Fourth solo photobook.
5	Takahashi Ai Shashinshū "19"; 高橋愛写真集『19』; Ai Takahashi Photobook "19"		January 27, 2006	Wani Books; ISBN 4-8470-2913-5	Fifth solo photobook.
6	Takahashi Ai Shashinshū Zenshu "ai"; 高橋愛写真集全集『ai』; Ai Takahashi Photobook Complete Works "Ai"		October 27, 2006	Wani Books; ISBN 4-8470-2961-5	Compilation photobook.
7	Love Hello! Takahashi Ai Shashinshū in Phuket; ラブハロ！高橋愛写真集inプーケット; Love Hello! Ai Takahashi Photobook in Phuket		March 14, 2007	Kadokawa Publishing Group; ISBN 4-04-894485-1	Seventh solo photobook. Photographed in Phuket, Thailand.
8	Takahashi Ai Shashinshū "Mizu"; 高橋愛写真集『水』; Ai Takahashi Photobook "Water"		October 26, 2007	Wani Books; ISBN 978-4-8470-4049-8	Eighth solo photobook. Photographed in Bali.
9	Takahashi Ai Shashinshū "Mō Hitotsu no Ai"; 高橋愛写真集『もうひとつの愛』; Ai Takahashi Photobook "Another Ai"		May 25, 2008	Wani Books; ISBN 978-4-8470-4088-7	Ninth solo photobook.
10	Takahashi Ai Shashinshū "Watashi"; 高橋愛写真集『私』; Ai Takahashi Photobook "I"		May 25, 2009	Wani Books; ISBN 978-4-8470-4170-9	Tenth solo photobook.
11	Takahashi Ai Shashinshū "Katachi"; 高橋愛写真集『形（かたち）』; Ai Takahashi Photobook "Figure"		May 27, 2010	Wani Books; ISBN 978-4-8470-4283-6	Eleventh solo photobook.
12	Takahashi Ai Shashinshū "LOVE NO.10"; 高橋愛写真集『LOVE NO.10』; Ai Takahashi Photobook "LOVE NO.10"		March 28, 2011	Wani Books; ISBN 978-4-8470-4365-9	Twelfth solo photobook.
13	Takahashi Ai Shashinshū "Ai Ai Ai"; 高橋愛写真集『愛愛愛』; Ai Takahashi Photobook "Love Love Love"		September 14, 2011	Wani Books; ISBN 978-4-8470-4397-0	Thirteenth solo photobook.
14	AI am I. Ai Takahashi FASHION STYLE BOOK; AI am I. 高橋愛FASHION STYLE BOOK; AI am I. Ai Takahashi FASHION STYLE BOOK		October 19, 2013	Takarajimasha; ISBN 978-4-8002-1802-5	First stylebook from Ai Takahashi, focuses on her life style, private clothes, makeup
15	I have AI. AI TAKAHASHI STYLEBOOK 2		September 27, 2014	Takarajimasha; ISBN 978-4-8002-3137-6	Second stylebook from Ai Takahashi, features her private fashion
16	30.		September 27, 2016	Takarajimasha; ISBN 978-4-8002-6123-6	30th birthday style book; fashion and makeup tips plus private photos
17	i ♡ magazine; i love magazine		October 12, 2017	Takarajimasha; ISBN 978-4-8002-7586-8	Ai Takahashi's street fashion, accessory tips, and DVD
18	Takahashi Ai no Kankoku Hon.; 高橋愛の韓国本。; Takahashi Ai's South Korea Guide Book		April 23, 2018	Kodansha; ISBN 978-4-0622-0975-5	Ai Takahashi's first guide book, about South Korea
19	Ai Takahashi MAKE-UP BOOK		November 30, 2018	Takarajimasha; ISBN 978-4-8002-7892-0	Ai Takahashi's first make-up book, with Brown Eye Mascara
20	AI VERSARY		October 29, 2021	Takarajimasha; ISBN 978-4-2990-2032-1	Ai Takahashi's 20th anniversary memorial book

=== DVDs ===
#	Title	Release date
1	Alo Hello! Takahashi Ai DVD (アロハロ!高橋愛DVD)	December 17, 2003
2	Love Hello! Takahashi Ai DVD (ラブハロ!高橋愛DVD)	April 11, 2007
3	I Takahashi Ai DVD (写真集『私』高橋愛DVD)	June 17, 2009
4	Figure Takahashi Ai DVD (写真集『形（かたち）』高橋愛DVD)	June 2, 2010
5	Ai loves you I love Ai Takahashi Ai DVD (写真集『Ai loves you I love Ai』高橋愛DVD)	April 20, 2011
6	Real Etude ~Takahashi Family to Niigaki Family DVD 1 (モーニング娘。高橋愛＆新垣里沙 リアルエチュード『高橋さん家と新垣さん家 ゲスト：パパイヤ鈴木編』 DVD)	May 31, 2011
7	Real Etude ~Takahashi Family to Niigaki Family DVD 2 (モーニング娘。高橋愛＆新垣里沙 リアルエチュード『高橋さん家と新垣さん家 ゲスト：金剛地武志編』 DVD)	May 31, 2011
8	Real Etude ~Takahashi Family to Niigaki Family DVD 3 (モーニング娘。高橋愛＆新垣里沙 リアルエチュード『高橋さん家と新垣さん家 ゲスト：松崎しげる編』 DVD)	May 31, 2011
9	Love Love Love Takahashi Ai DVD (写真集『Love Love Love』高橋愛DVD)	September 21, 2011

== Acts ==
=== Film ===
Year	Title	Role	Notes	Ref.
2023	Oshorin			

=== Television dramas ===
Title	Start date	End date
Angel Hearts	2002	
Mini Moni's Brementown Musicians (ミニモニ。でブレーメンの音楽隊)	January 10, 2005	January 31, 2005
Hitmaker Aku Yuu Monogatari (ヒットメーカー 阿久悠物語)	August 1, 2008	
Q.E.D Shōmei Shūryō (Q.E.D 証明終了)	January 8, 2009	March 12, 2009
Koi Choco – Bitter Sweet Angel (恋のチョコ-ビタースウィートエンジェル)	February 14, 2011	

=== Television shows ===
Show	Start date	End date	Network
Hello! Morning (ハロー！モーニング。)	2001	April 1, 2007	TV Tokyo
Matthew's Best Hit TV	May 29, 2002		TV Asahi
Tin Tin Town! (ティンティンTown!)	July 5, 2002	March 26, 2004	Nihon TV
Sore Yuke! Gorokkies (それゆけ!ゴロッキーズ)	September 29, 2003	December 26, 2003	TV Tokyo
Futarigoto (二人ゴト)	April 21, 2004	April 23, 2004	TV Tokyo
Futarigoto (二人ゴト)	July 23, 2004	July 29, 2004	TV Tokyo
Majokko Rika-chan no Magical v-u-den (魔女っ娘。梨華ちゃんのマジカル美勇伝)	December 1, 2004	December 6, 2004	TV Tokyo
Majokko Rika-chan no Magical v-u-den (魔女っ娘。梨華ちゃんのマジカル美勇伝)	December 16, 2004	December 17, 2004	TV Tokyo
Musume Dokyu! (娘DOKYU!)	April 4, 2005	June 8, 2005	TV Tokyo
Haromoni@ (ハロモニ@)	April 8, 2007	September 28, 2008	TV Tokyo
Yorosen! (よろセン!)	October 6, 2008	March 27, 2009	TV Tokyo

=== Radio ===
Program	Start date	End date	Network
MBS Young Town Dōyōbi (MBSヤングタウン土曜日)	April 12, 2003	Ongoing	MBS Radio
Ishikawa Rika no Chanchaka Charmy (☆石川梨華のちゃんちゃか☆チャーミー!)	March 3, 2005 (guest appearance)		CBC Radio
TBC Fun Fīrudo Mōretsu Mōdasshu (TBC Funふぃーるど・モーレツモーダッシュ)	May 16, 2005	May 27, 2005	TBC
