= Risa Niigaki =

Japanese singer and actress

- 新垣 里沙
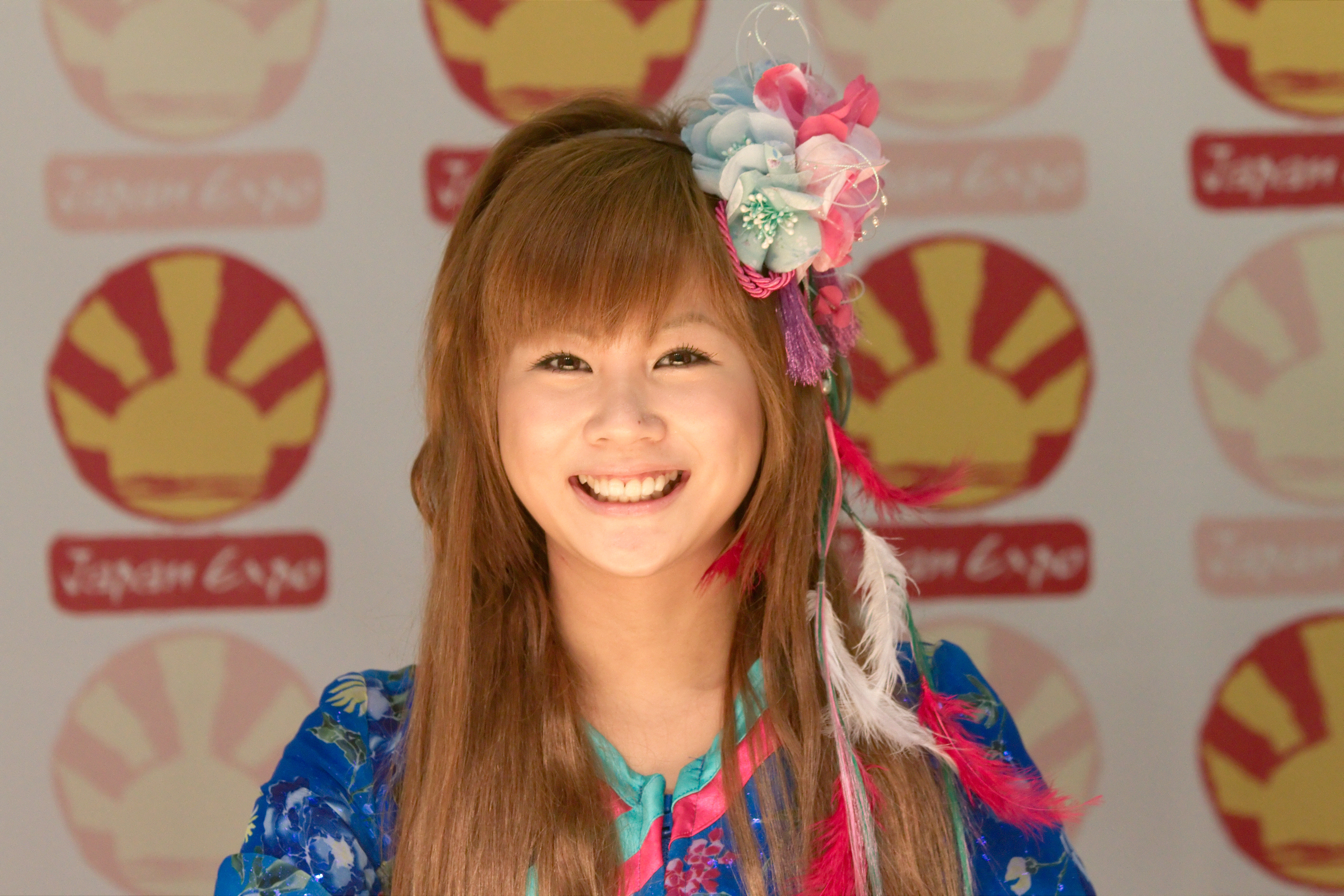
- Risa Niigaki at the Japan Expo on July 3, 2010
- Born: October 20, 1988 (age 37)
- Occupations: Singer; actress; model; dancer; rapper
- Years active: 2001–present
- Spouses: Yoshikazu Kotani (m. 2016; div. 2018); Yasutake Yamaguchi (m. 2022)
- Children: 1
- Musical career
- Genres: J-pop
- Instrument: Vocals
- Label: Zetima
- Formerly of: Morning Musume; Tanpopo; Sakuragumi; Happy7; 7Air; H.P. All Stars; Athena & Robikerottsu; ZYX
- Website: Official Website

Risa Niigaki (新垣 里沙, Niigaki Risa; born October 20, 1988) is a Japanese actress and singer. She was a fifth-generation member of the Japanese pop group Morning Musume. She joined Morning Musume in 2001 along with 3 others- Ai Takahashi, Asami Konno and Makoto Ogawa. She grew up in Yokohama after moving there at the age of six. She was one of the longest serving members of Morning Musume, and was the leader of the group from October 2011 to her graduation on May 18, 2012.

== Biography ==
=== History ===
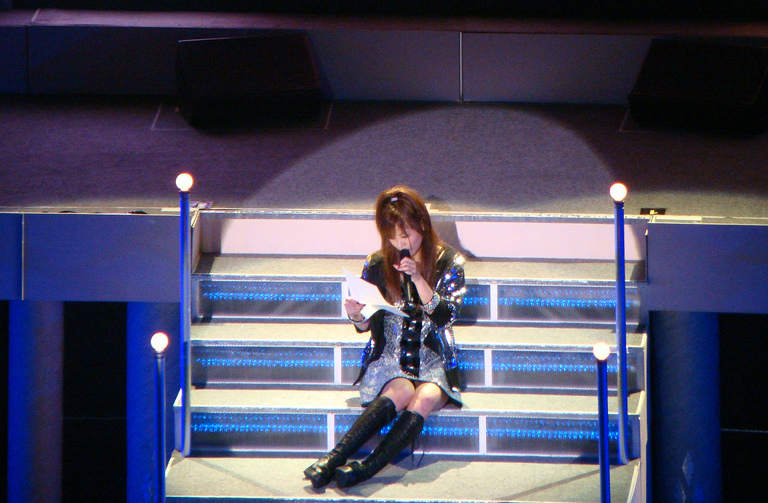
Niigaki performing at Morning Musume's Platinum 9 Disco concert tour in May 2009

Niigaki was born in Yokohama, Kanagawa. She was the runner-up for the 'Kiss Girl Audition' in becoming the Tomy image girl before joining Morning Musume. She appeared with the winner Ai Hasegawa in a Tomy Karaoke Machine commercial.

In 2001, Niigaki joined Morning Musume as the fifth generation along with Ai Takahashi, Asami Konno, and Makoto Ogawa. Morning Musume producer Tsunku said he chose Niigaki because she "shined during the final studio recording" for the audition song that all the finalists had to sing. She debuted and lead on the group's 13th single, "Mr. Moonlight (Ai no Big Band)" making her one of the few members of Morning Musume who was able to lead on her debut single. She first appeared in their 4th album, 4th Ikimasshoi!. In the summer of that year, she also debuted in a shuffle unit as part of Happy 7, with two other members of her generation (Ai Takahashi and Makoto Ogawa).

Later in September, all fifth-generation members were placed into subgroups. Niigaki was placed into Tanpopo as a member of the third generation, along with Asami Konno. The new line-up only released one single before becoming inactive.

Niigaki, along with many other members of Morning Musume at that time, starred in a drama entitled Angel Hearts which was released in 2002. In 2003, she was placed into Sakuragumi, which released two singles before also becoming inactive.

In early 2007, Niigaki was chosen to be a member of the Morning Musume Tanjō 10nen Kinentai (モーニング娘。誕生10年記念隊) along with Kaori Iida, Natsumi Abe, Maki Goto and Koharu Kusumi – a unit created to celebrate Morning Musume's 10th anniversary. Their first single, Bokura ga Ikiru My Asia (僕らが生きるMy Asia), was released on January 24, 2007. On June 1, 2007, Miki Fujimoto's resigned from Morning Musume, Ai Takahashi replaced Fujimoto as leader, while Risa Niigaki took Takahashi's place as sub-leader.

Following the announcement of Nozomi Tsuji's pregnancy, Niigaki took over Tsuji's role as Athena in the animation series Robby & Kerobby. In October 2007, Niigaki was placed in the unit Athena & Robikerottsu along with fellow Morning Musume member Aika Mitsui, as well as Saki Nakajima and Chisato Okai of Cute.

It then was announced in July 2008 that Niigaki and Ai Takahashi would play the 70s idol J-pop duo Pink Lady in the TV drama Hitmaker Aku Yū Monogatari. From August 6 until August 25, 2008, Morning Musume performed a version of Rodgers and Hammerstein's Cinderella with the Takarazuka Revue, in which Niigaki starred as the Prince. On February 12, 2009, it was announced that Morning Musume would be performing in the United States at the 2009 Anime Expo, the nation's largest anime convention, as one of the first official guests of honor. In an interview Niigaki stated that "The movies that Disney makes are full of dreams, but when I have children, I'd like them to know about war, the pain of death and such things, so I hope they will watch [anime]." Niigaki also revealed that her favorite anime was Sailor Moon, stating that "we copied the hairstyles and had a 'Sailor Moon' playhouse in kindergarten." Niigaki became one of four members to remain in Morning Musume for seven years or more (the others being Kaori Iida, Hitomi Yoshizawa, and fellow fifth-generation member Ai Takahashi). Niigaki and Takahashi became the longest-serving members in Morning Musume history, on January 17, 2009, breaking the four-year-old record set by Kaori Iida. Later in August, Niigaki and Takahashi became the first members to remain in Morning Musume for eight years. Niigaki was later assigned to be a part of the new shuffle group ZYX-α with Koharu Kusumi, Maasa Sudo, Momoko Tsugunaga, Erika Umeda, Chinami Tokunaga, Saki Ogawa, and Ayaka Wada.

On January 9, 2011, it was announced that Ai Takahashi would graduate from Morning Musume and Hello! ProjectHello! A project at the end of their autumn 2011 concert tour. Niigaki would take over the position as leader of Morning Musume after Takahashi's graduation. After Takahashi's graduation, Niigaki became the only member of Hello! Project that had joined before the Hello! Project Kids, and holds the record for the longest-serving member of Morning Musume and Hello! Project.

She would graduate from Morning Musume and Hello! Project on the last day of their Spring Concert Tour, May 18, at Nippon Budokan. Niigaki was the fourth Morning Musume member to graduate at the Budokan. On May 18, 2012, Niigaki graduated from Morning Musume and Hello! Project alongside Aika Mitsui. She handed down her position as leader of Morning Musume to Sayumi Michishige.

== Personal life ==
Niigaki began dating Yoshikazu Kotani after starring together in the stage play Absolute Boyfriend in 2013. After two years of dating, they held their marriage ceremony on July 11, 2016. On January 6, 2018, both announced on their blogs that they were filing for divorce, citing they were growing apart.

On June 30, 2022, Niigaki announced that she is remarried with a YouTube cinematographer Yasutake Yamaguchi. On May 1, 2026, the couple announced they were expecting their first child. On July 18, she gave birth to her first child, a baby boy.

== Releases ==
=== Photobooks ===
| # | Title | Release date | Publisher | ISBN | Photobook information |
|---|---|---|---|---|---|
| – | 5 – Morning Musume 5 Ki Generation Member Shashinshū (5 モーニング娘。5期メンバー写真集) | 2002-08-16 | Wani Books | ISBN 4-8470-2721-3 | Photobook starring all of the 5th generation members |
| 1 | Niigaki Risa (1stソロ写真集「新垣里沙」) | 2004-10-07 | Wani Books | ISBN 4-8470-2827-9 | First solo photobook |
| 2 | Ama Natsu (2ndソロ写真集「あま夏」) | 2006-06-25 | Wani Books | ISBN 4-8470-2941-0 | Second solo photobook |
| 3 | Isshun (3rdソロ写真集「一瞬」) | 2007-05-27 | Wani Books | ISBN 4-8470-4013-9 | Third solo photobook |
| 4 | Happy Girl (4thソロ写真集「Happy Girl」) | 2008-04-25 | Wani Books | ISBN 4-8470-4080-5 | Fourth solo photobook |

=== DVDs ===
- 2007-06-13 – Alo Hello! Niigaki Risa DVD (アロハロ！新垣里沙 DVD)
- 2009-01-21 – Alo Hello! 2 Niigaki Risa DVD (アロハロ！2 新垣里沙 DVD)
- 2010-07-14 – Alo Hello! 3 Niigaki Risa DVD (アロハロ！3 新垣里沙 DVD)

== Acts ==
=== Movies ===
- 2002 – Tokkaekko (とっかえっ娘。)
- 2003 – Koinu Dan no Monogatari (子犬ダンの物語)

=== Dramas ===
- 2002 – Angel Hearts
- 2002 – Ore ga Aitsu de Aitsu ga Ore de (おれがあいつであいつがおれで)
- 2008 – Hitmaker Aku Yū Monogatari as Kei from Pink Lady

=== Television shows ===
| Show | Start date | End date |
|---|---|---|
| Hello! Morning (ハロー！モーニング。) | 2001 | April 1, 2007 |
| Tin Tin Town! (ティンティンTown!) | July 5, 2002 | March 26, 2004 |
| Sore Yuke! Gorokkies (それゆけ!ゴロッキーズ) | September 29, 2003 | December 26, 2003 |
| Futarigoto (二人ゴト) | July 1, 2004 | July 2, 2004 |
| Futarigoto (二人ゴト) | July 23, 2004 | July 29, 2004 |
| Majokko Rika-chan no Magical v-u-den (魔女っ娘。梨華ちゃんのマジカル美勇伝) | October 21, 2004 | November 10, 2004 |
| Musume Dokyu! (娘Dokyu!) | June 13, 2005 | — |
| Haromoni@ (ハロモニ@) | April 8, 2007 | September 28, 2008 |

=== Radio ===
| Program | Start date | End date |
|---|---|---|
| Tanpopo Henshūbu Oh-So-Ro! (タンポポ編集部 Oh-So-Ro!) | September 24, 2002 | September 23, 2003 |
| TBC Fun Fīrudo Mōretsu Mōdasshu (TBC Funふぃーるど・モーレツモーダッシュ) | April 1, 2005 | April 15, 2005 |
| TBC Fun Fīrudo Mōretsu Mōdasshu (TBC Funふぃーるど・モーレツモーダッシュ) | July 25, 2005 | August 5, 2005 |
| Hello Pro Yanen!! (ハロプロやねん!!) | June 10, 2005 | June 24, 2005 |
