= Sayumi Michishige =

Japanese singer, actress and model (born 1989)

Sayumi Michishige 道重 さゆみ
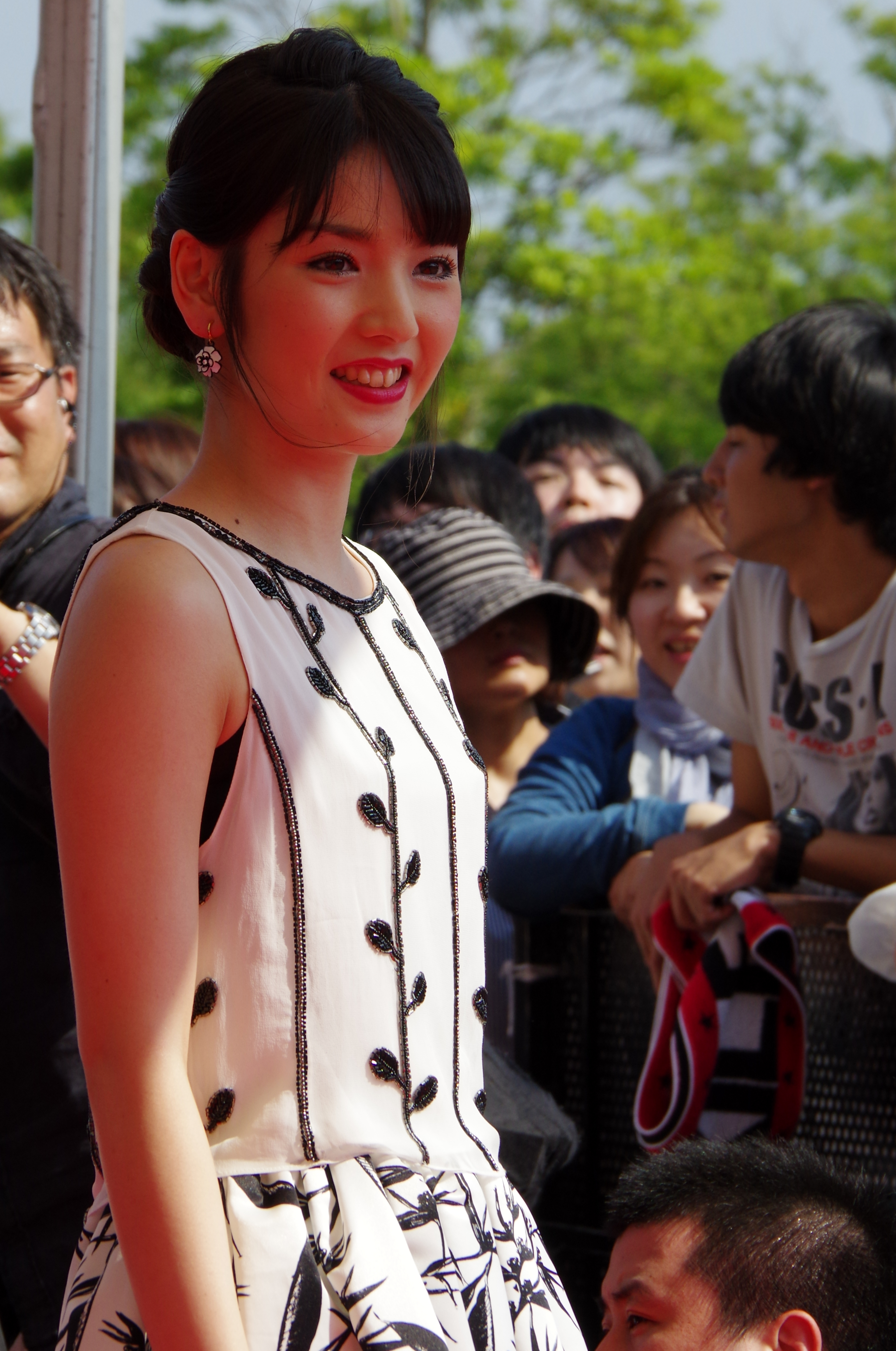
- Michishige at the 13th MTV Video Music Awards Japan in June 2014

Background information
- Also known as: Sayumin, Shige-san, Sayu, Shige-pink, Misshige
- Born: July 13, 1989 (age 37); Ube, Yamaguchi, Japan
- Occupations: Singer; Model; Dancer; Actress; radio host
- Years active: 2003–2014; 2017–2025
- Musical career
- Genres: J-pop
- Label: Zetima
- Website: www.up-front-promotion.co.jp/artist/

Sayumi Michishige (道重 さゆみ, Michishige Sayumi; (named after Sayumi Horie) born July 13, 1989) is a former Japanese singer, actress and model. She is a former sixth-generation member and former leader of the J-pop group Morning Musume.

Michishige was born in Ube, Yamaguchi Prefecture, Japan. She joined Morning Musume in 2003 along with Eri Kamei, Miki Fujimoto, and Reina Tanaka, who all debuted with Morning Musume on the group's nineteenth single, "Shabondama". In 2005, she was assigned as mentor to seventh-generation member Koharu Kusumi, until Kusumi left the group in December 2009. Michishige was also a member of the Hello! Project unit Ecomoni, along with former Morning Musume member Rika Ishikawa.

During her term in Morning Musume, she portrays a visual-focused, self-confident image of herself in more TV shows, often calling herself the cutest member in Morning Musume and saying that her cuteness overwhelms her poor singing skills. In one of the skits known as Hello! Morning Theatre on their variety show, Hello! Morning, she frequently played a character known as "Ichiban Kawaii" (Cutest).

== Biography ==
=== Early life and family ===
Michishige is from Ube, Yamaguchi. She is the youngest child in the family, she has an elder brother and an elder sister.

=== Morning Musume Career (2003–2014) ===
In 2002, at the age of 13, Michishige participated in the Love Audition 2002 held by Up-Front Agency in search of new members for the Japanese female idol group Morning Musume. Tens of thousand of contestants auditioned, but only four where chosen in the final stage. Michishige, along with Eri Kamei, Miki Fujimoto, and Reina Tanaka were admitted to Morning Musume as sixth-generation members on January 19, 2003.

A few weeks later, she was placed in Morning Musume's subgroup Morning Musume Otomegumi, when the group was temporarily divided so it could perform in smaller towns, thereby reaching out to a greater number of fans who could not otherwise watch them perform live. During the spring, she, along with the other sixth-generation members, made her first concert appearance on the Morning Musume Concert Tour 2003 Spring "Non Stop!" during second-generation member Kei Yasuda's leaving ceremony.

On July 16, 2003, the sixth-generation members (with the exception of Miki Fujimoto) released their first photobook and corresponding DVD, both shot in Hawaii, as part of the Alo Hello! (アロハロ!) series. Their musical debut came shortly thereafter, on July 30, with Morning Musume's 19th single, "Shabondama". Towards the end of 2003, Michishige began appearing in the show Revelations of M (Mの黙示録, M no Mokushiroku), as a regular with ex-Morning Musume member Yuko Nakazawa.

2004 saw her first appearance on an album, Best! Morning Musume 2, and in a movie—Star Sand Island, My Island – Island Dreamin (星砂の島、私の島－～Island Dreamin'～, Hoshisuna no Shima, Watashi no Shima – Island Dreamin'). During the summer, Michishige appeared in her first solo photobook and was placed in a temporary unit called Ecomoni with fourth-generation Morning Musume member Rika Ishikawa. Originally, the goal of the group was to promote environmental awareness only for the duration of the Cool Down the Hot Earth (熱っちぃ地球を冷ますんだ, "Atchii Chikyū wo Samasunda") festival, but their popularity led to the members being cast as voice actors for the fourth Hamtaro movie—along with Hello! Project soloist Aya Matsuura, with whom they also released the main theme for the film, titled "Tensai! Let's Go Ayayamu" (天才！Let's Go あややム, Genius! Let's Go Ayayamu)—and appeared in subsequent festivals.

In 2005, Michshige and Rika Ishikawa released a duo photobook titled Angels (エンジェルズ). Michishige also appeared as a regular news anchor on Hello! Morning for most of the second half of 2005. That year, she was assigned to be a mentor to seventh-generation member Koharu Kusumi, with whom she formed a duo called Rainbow Pink in the beginning of 2006. Introducing themselves as "Shige-pink" and "Koha-pink", the group was featured on Morning Musume's seventh album, Rainbow 7, with the song "Rainbow Pink" (レインボーピンク), and subsequently on the 7.5 Fuyu Fuyu Morning Musume Mini! and Sexy 8 Beat albums, with "Wa Merry Pin Xmas!" (わ～MerryピンXmas!) and "Takara no Hako" (宝の箱, Treasure Box), respectively.

Following in fellow Morning Musume member Miki Fujimoto's footsteps, Michishige began hosting a radio show titled Hypernight - Michishige Sayumi Konya mo Usa-chan Peace (ハイパーナイト モーニング娘。道重さゆみの今夜も♥うさちゃんピース) in October 2006. Running approximately 30 minutes per episode, Michishige's show consisted of her answering fan mail and participating in several games, among which saying a given phrase/expression in reverse, and giving general advice to her listeners.

Michishige's second solo photobook, titled Longing (憧憬, Doukei), was published on January 15, 2007. Shot in Okinawa, the book featured school uniform, swimsuit, simple one-piece, and wet yukata/bathrobe shots, in an attempt to convey a more mature image of the seventeen-year-old idol.

Michishige also starred in Bow30° (「おじぎ30度」), an original internet drama created for the purpose of advertising the Family Restaurant chain Gusto (ガスト), as Ruruka Chī (地井ルルカ), a novice waitress training under the supervision of her seniors Karin Kinoshita (木下花梨) (played by Morning Musume's Ai Takahashi) and Mika Mochizuki (望月深華) (played by Reiko Tokita).

On June 9, 2007, Michishige began co-hosting the Young Town radio show as a result of Miki Fujimoto's Friday magazine scandal and subsequent resignation from Morning Musume. Shortly thereafter she released her third solo photobook and DVD, 17: Love Hello, both shot on the island of Guam. Her fourth solo photobook, Sōsō, was published in December 2007.

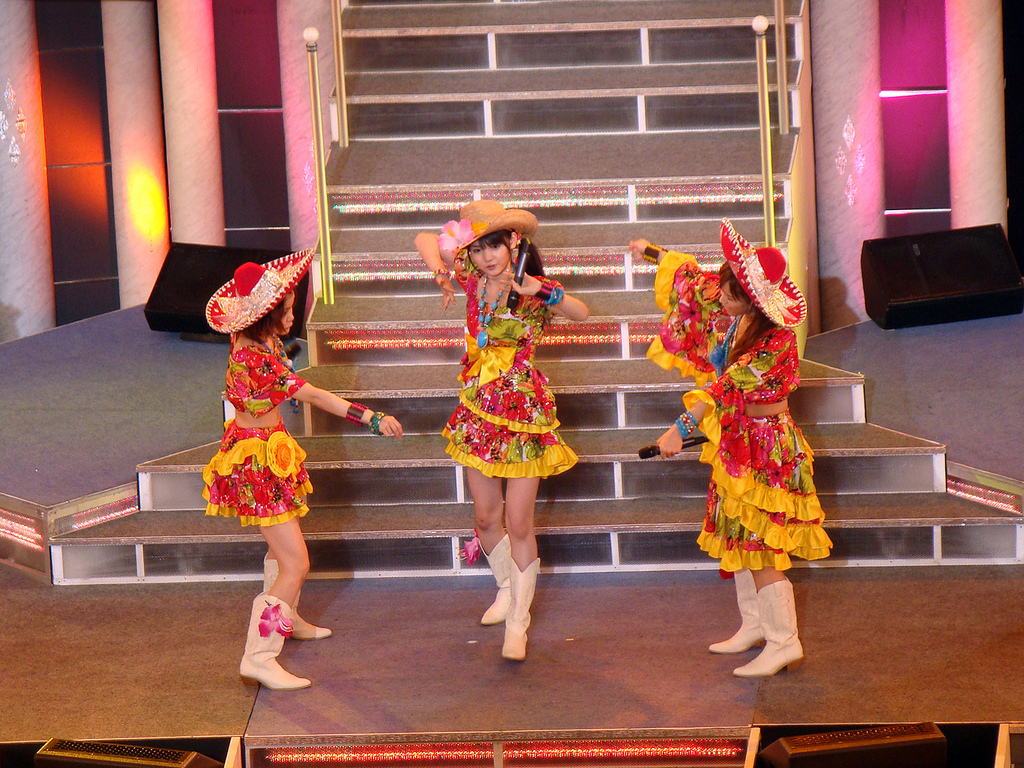
Aika Mitsui (left), Michishige (center), and Eri Kamei performing at Morning Musume's Platinum 9 Disc concert tour in May 2009

On January 3, 2009, for the first time since she joined Morning Musume, Michishige appeared as an independent talent on a TV show, namely the Otona Gakuryoku Kentei SP (大人学力検定スペシャル, Adult Knowledge Test Special) quiz show. A cast of 30 performers (including former v-u-den member Yui Okada and former second-generation Morning Musume member Mari Yaguchi) gathered to answer a series of questions taken from elementary school textbooks. From a total of 60 questions she managed to score 22 (37%) and placed 29th. Later that year, Michishige was assigned to be a part of the new shuffle group zoku v-u-den, a revival of v-u-den, along with Risako Sugaya (of Berryz Kobo) and Junjun (also of Morning Musume).

When Risa Niigaki left on May 18, 2012, Sayumi Michishige was declared the new Morning Musume leader.

On April 29, 2014, during the Morning Musume '14 Concert Tour Haru: Evolution concert in Yamaguchi, Michishige announced her graduation from Morning Musume and Hello! Project. Morning Musume's Fall 2014 concert tour will see her depart. With her exit announced for Morning Musume's Fall 2014 concert tour, the group consisted only of the three most recent generations since the introduction of the fourth-generation members in 2000. She graduated from Morning Musume and Hello! Project on November 26, 2014, and Mizuki Fukumura took over as group leader.

=== Post-Morning Musume and comeback announcement (2014–2016) ===
After graduating, Michishige announced that she will take time to rest her mind and body and citied a possible comeback in the future.

On October 2, 2016, Michishige posted an entry in her blog after two years of absence. After that post she has been regularly updating her blog.

On November 26, she posted on her blog entry, "Michishige Sayumi Saisei" (道重さゆみ再生; Michishige Sayumi Rebirth) in hiragana, and in it she announced that would be resuming activities starting spring 2017.

=== Solo artist activities (2017–2025) ===
Before retire, Michishige was worked under Up Front Promotion. Her performance SAYUMINGLANDOLL ran in March and July at the Cotton Club. In December 2023, Michishige's agency announced she had recently been diagnosed with obsessive–compulsive disorder and would be restricting some activities until her symptoms improved.

In January 2025, Michishige announced on her blog that she would retire in the summer.

She held her solo live tour “SAYUMINGLANDOLL～SAMSALA~“ in July 2025, and retired on 14 August 2025 after the end of the event.

== Works ==
=== Photobooks ===
Title	Release date	Publisher	ISBN	Description
Morning Musume 6th Generation Member Shashinshū (ハロハロ! モーニング娘。6期メンバー写真集)	July 15, 2003	Kadokawa Shoten	978-4-04-894251-5	With Eri Kamei and Reina Tanaka
Sayumi Michishige Shashinshū "Michishige Sayumi" (道重さゆみ写真集「道重さゆみ」)	October 30, 2004	Wani Books	978-4-8470-2833-5	First solo photobook
Rika Ishikawa & Sayumi Michishige "Angels" (石川梨華&道重さゆみ写真集「エンジェルス」)	November 16, 2005	Wani Books	978-4-8470-2895-3	Photobook with Rika Ishikawa
Sayumi Michishige Shashinshū "Dōkei" (道重さゆみ写真集「憧憬」)	January 15, 2007	Wani Books	978-4-8470-2987-5	Solo photobook
17: Love Hello! Sayumi Michishige (17～ラブハロ！道重さゆみ写真集～)	June 30, 2007	Kadokawa Shoten	978-4-04-894495-3	Solo photobook, shot in Guam
Sayumi Michishige Shashinshū "Sōsō" (道重さゆみ写真集「蒼蒼~そうそう~」)	December 14, 2007	Wani Books	978-4-8470-4055-9	Solo photobook
Sayumi Michishige Shashinshū "Love Letter" (道重さゆみ写真集「LOVE LETTER」)	September 25, 2008	Wani Books	978-4-4121-1	Solo photobook
"Hatachi Shichigatsu Jūsannichi" (道重さゆみ写真集「20歳7月13日」)	July 13, 2009	Wani Books	978-4-8470-4183-9	Solo photobook, in Okinawa/Tokyo
Sayumi Michishige Shashinshū "La" (道重さゆみ写真集『ラー』)	April 26, 2010	Wani Books	978-4-8470-4269-0	Solo photobook, shot in Guam
Sayumi Michishige Shashinshū "Sayuminglandoll" (道重さゆみ 写真集 『 Sayuminglandoll 』)	October 27, 2011	Wani Books	978-4-8470-4398-7	Solo photobook
Sayumi Michishige Shashinshū "Mille-feuille" (道重さゆみ 写真集 『 美ルフィーユ 』)	January 25, 2012	Wani Books	978-4-8470-4525-7	Solo photobook, 10th anniversary debut
Sayumi Michishige Shashinshū "Blue Rose" (道重さゆみ写真集「Blue Rose」)	October 27, 2013	Wani Books	978-4-8470-4590-5	Solo photobook
Michishige Sayumi Morning Musume. '14 Last Shashinshū "YOUR LOVE" (道重さゆみ モーニング娘。 '14 ラスト写真集 『 YOUR LOVE 』)	October 26, 2014	Wani Books	978-4-8470-4689-6	Solo photobook, Last photobook on Morning Musume, in Okinawa
Sayumi Michishige Shashinshū "DREAM " (道重さゆみ 写真集 『DREAM』)	July 13, 2018	Wani Books	978-4-8470-8134-7	Solo photobook, in Lake Kawaguchi

=== Books ===
Title	Release date	Publisher	ISBN	Description
Sayumi Michishige Personal Book『 Sayu 』 (道重さゆみ パーソナルブック 『 Sayu 』)	July 13, 2014	Wani Books	978-4-8470-4665-0	
Morning Musume. '14 Photobook "Michishige Camera '13-'14" (モーニング娘。`14 写真集 『 ミチシゲカメラ '13-'14 』)	May 30, 2014	Wani Books	978-4-8470-4651-3	as Photographer
Morning Musume.'14 Photobook "Michishige Camera 2 - '14graduation -" (モーニング娘。`14 写真集 『 ミチシゲカメラ2 -'14graduation- 』)	February 25, 2015	Wani Books	978-4-8470-4735-0	as Photographer
Visual Book [Michishige Sayumi SAYUMINGLANDOLL - Saisei -] (SAYUMINGLANDOLL～再生～)	March 19, 2017	Hello!Project Official Shop	978-4-8470-8220-7	
Itoshi no Paris Neko - Oshare de Kawaii Paris no Neko Cafe de Iya Sareru! (愛しのパリ猫 - おしゃれでかわいいパリの猫カフェで癒される! -)	April 17, 2017	Wani Books	978-4-8470-9499-6	with Masa Tanaka, as Photographer
Visual Book [SAYUMINGLANDOLL - Shukumei -] (SAYUMINGLANDOLL～宿命～)	October 1, 2018	Hello!Project Official Shop	220-0-0003-2765-9	
Itoshi no Paris Neko 2 - Neko to Sēra to Watashi - (愛しのパリ猫2 - 猫とセーラと私)	April 16, 2018	Wani Books	978-4-8470-8111-8	with Masa Tanaka, as Photographer
Visual Book [SAYUMINGLANDOLL - Tokyo] (SAYUMINGLANDOLL～東京～)	October 16, 2018	Wani Books	220-0-0003-8597-0	
Sayumi Michishige Personal Book『 SAYU~LOVE30~ 』 (道重さゆみ パーソナルブック 『 SAYU~LOVE30~ 』)	July 13, 2019	Wani Books	978-4-8470-8220-7	

=== Singles ===
Title	Release date	Information
Loneliness Tokyo	October 8, 2018	
Zettai Kanojo (絶対彼女)	March 13, 2019	Seiko Oomori feat. Michishige Sayumi

=== Other songs ===
Title	Release date	Information
Senkou Hanabi (せんこう花火)	September 14, 2004	Morning Musume cover
It's You	March 18, 2009	
Lalala no Pipipi (ラララのピピピ)	September 12, 2012	
Aruiteru (Updated) (歩いてる)	September 25, 2013	Morning Musume cover
Night Light	December 1, 2021	Night Tempo feat. Sayumi Michishige on Ladies In The City album

=== Best albums ===
Title	Release date	Information
SAYUMINGLANDOLL～Memorial～ (SAYUMINGLANDOLL～メモリアル～)	August 5, 2019	
SAYUMINGLANDOLL~SAYUTOPIA~	September 1, 2021	
SAYUMINGLANDOLL～Sayumi Mirai～ (SAYUMINGLANDOLL〜サユミミライ〜)	February 15, 2023	

=== Original soundtrack albums ===
Title	Release date	Information
SAYUMINGLANDOLL～Saisei～ Original Soundtrack (SAYUMINGLANDOLL～再生～オリジナルサウンドトラック)	July 5, 2017	Live Show at Cotton Club Osaka
SAYUMINGLANDOLL～Shukumei～ Original Soundtrack (SAYUMINGLANDOLL～宿命～オリジナルサウンドトラック)	July 4, 2018	Live Show
SAYUMINGLANDOLL～Tokyo～ Original Soundtrack (SAYUMINGLANDOLL～東京～オリジナルサウンドトラック)	December 5, 2018	Live Show
SAYUMINGLANDOLL ~Kibou~ Original Soundtrack (SAYUMINGLANDOLL～希望～ オリジナルサウンドトラック)	November 3, 2019	Live Show, EP series part 1
SAYUMINGLANDOLL ~Kibou~ Original Soundtrack 2 (SAYUMINGLANDOLL～希望～ オリジナルサウンドトラック2)	January 11, 2020	Live Show, EP series part 2
SAYUMINGLANDOLL ~Kibou~ Original Soundtrack 3 (SAYUMINGLANDOLL～希望～ オリジナルサウンドトラック3)	April 4, 2020	Live Show, EP series part 3

=== Video albums ===
Title	Release date	Information
Hello Hello! (ハロハロ!)	July 16, 2003	DVD with Eri Kamei and Reina Tanaka
17～Love Hello! Michishige Sayumi DVD～ (17～ラブハロ!道重さゆみ DVD～)	July 18, 2007	First solo DVD, filmed in Hawaii
Michishige Sayumi LOVE STORY (道重さゆみ LOVE STORY)	October 1, 2008	Making Photobook
20's time	July 22, 2009	Second solo DVD, filmed in Okinawa
Michishige Sayumi SAYU (道重さゆみ さゆ)	April 28, 2010	Making Photobook
Homey	March, 2011	Released as part of the e-Hello! lineup.
Michishige Sayumi SAYUMI + (道重さゆみ SAYUMI+)	November 19, 2014	Last solo DVD as member of Morning Musume '14
SAYUMINGLANDOLL～Saisei～ (SAYUMINGLANDOLL～再生～)	December 20, 2017	Live Show at Cotton Club Osaka Blu-ray
SAYUMINGLANDOLL～Shukumei～ (SAYUMINGLANDOLL～宿命～)	November 7, 2018	Live Show Blu-ray
SAYUMINGLANDOLL～Tokyo～ (SAYUMINGLANDOLL～東京～)	November 20, 2019	Live Show Blu-ray
SAYUMINGLANDOLL～BIRTHDAY LIVE 2019～	November 20, 2019	Live Show DVD
M-line Special 2021~Make a Wish!~ on 20th June	November 3, 2021	Live Show DVD, with PINK CRES., Reina Tanaka and Karin Miyamoto
SAYUMINGLANDOLL～Kibou～ (SAYUMINGLANDOLL～希望～)	December 12, 2021	Live Show Blu-ray
SAYUMINGLANDOLL～BIRTHDAY LIVE 2022～	February 15, 2023	Live Show DVD
SAYUMINGLANDOLL～Mirai～ (SAYUMINGLANDOLL～未来～)	December 13, 2023	Live Show Blu-ray

=== Video games ===
Title	Release date	Role
Dragon Nest	August, 2011	Haloli, voice

=== Movies ===
Title	Release date	Role
Hoshisuna no Shima, Watashi no Shima: Island Dreamin' (星砂の島、私の島 ~アイランド・ドリーミン~)	February 21, 2004	Toguchi Sato
Hamtaro and the Demon of the Picture Book Tower (劇場版とっとこハム太郎はむはむぱらだいちゅ! ハム太郎とふしぎのオニの絵本塔)	December 23, 2004	Shigeham (Eco-ham), voice
Tatakae!! Cyborg Shibata 3 (闘え!! サイボーグしばた 3)	September 28, 2005	Sayumi Michishige
Teketeke 2 (テケテケ２)	March 21, 2009	Sayumi
Keitai Deka THE MOVIE 3 Morning Musume Kyuushutsu Daisakusen! ~Pandora no Hako no Himitsu (ケータイ刑事 THE MOVIE3 モーニング娘。救出大作戦！～パンドラの箱の秘密)	February 5, 2011	Sayumi Michishige

=== Stage ===
Show	Start date	End date	Role
HELP!! Netsu Tchii Chikyū o Samasundatsu. (HELP!!熱っちぃ地球を冷ますんだっ。)	May 29, 2004	June 13, 2004,	Oizumi Michiru
Ribon no Kishi Musical (リボンの騎士 ザ・ミュージカル)	August 1, 2006	August 27, 2006	Lady / Talent Scout Liu
Ojigi 30-do on Stage (おじぎ30度 オン・ステージ)	February 27, 2008	March 2, 2008	Luluka Jii
Cinderella: The Musical (シンデレラ the ミュージカル)	August 6, 2008	August 25, 2008	Fairy 1
Ojigi de Shape Up! (おじぎでシェイプアップ!)	June 7, 2009	June 14, 2009	Luluka Jii
BS-TBS Kaikyoku 10-shūnen Kikaku 『Fashionable』 (BS-TBS開局10周年企画『ファッショナブル』)	June 11, 2010	June 20, 2010	Anna Morinari
Real-etude Minna no Ie Girl's STAGE (リアルエチュード みんなの家 Girl's STAGE)	February 22, 2012		various
Idol Nihonryuu ~Onna Nichibu~ (アイドル日本流～おんな日舞～)	July 26, 2012	August 21, 2012	
SAYUMINGLANDOLL～Saisei～ (SAYUMINGLANDOLL～再生～)	March 19, 2017	July 8, 2017	various
SAYUMINGLANDOLL～Shukumei～ (SAYUMINGLANDOLL～宿命～)	March 20, 2018	July 8, 2018	various
SAYUMINGLANDOLL～Tokyo～ (SAYUMINGLANDOLL～東京～)	October 10, 2018	March 22, 2019	various
SAYUMINGLANDOLL ~Kibou~ (SAYUMINGLANDOLL～希望～)	November 3, 2019	April 12, 2020	various
SAYUMINGLANDOLL ~Mirai~ (SAYUMINGLANDOLL～未来～)	August 16, 2022	January 31, 2023	various
SAYUMINGLANDOLL ~Oozora~ (SAYUMINGLANDOLL～大空～)	November 14, 2023	January 21, 2024	various

=== Series ===
Show	Release date	Role	Information
Ojigi 30 Do (おじぎ30度)	December 24, 2006	Chii Ruruka	Web-drama
Hanbun Esper (半分エスパー)	January 15, 2010	Senior part-time job	Fuji TV TWO
Kare wa, Imouto no Koibito (彼は、妹の恋人)	December 15, 2011	Haruka Hoshino (sister)	BeeTV
Suugaku Joshi Gakuen (数学女子学園)	January 11, 2012	Sayuri Tachikawa	NTV
Henkei Shōjo# 5 Arisa-hen (変形少女 #5 ありさ篇)	October 24, 2017	Arisa	Web-anime, voice

=== Television ===
Show	Start date	End date	Station
Hello! Morning (ハロー!モーニング。)	January 26, 2003	April 1, 2007	TV Tokyo
Sore Yuke! Gorokkies (それゆけ!ゴロッキーズ)	September 29, 2003	December 26, 2003	TV Tokyo
M no Mokushiroku (Mの黙示録)	October 7, 2003	September 9, 2004	TV Asahi
Futarigoto (二人ゴト)	June 16, 2004	June 25, 2004	TV Tokyo
Futarigoto (二人ゴト)	July 14, 2004	July 22, 2004	TV Tokyo
Majokko Rika-chan no Magical v-u-den (魔女っ娘。梨華ちゃんのマジカル美勇伝)	October 21, 2004	December 15, 2004	TV Tokyo
Musume Document 2005 (娘。ドキュメント2005)	January 5, 2005	April 1, 2005	TV Tokyo
Musume Dokyu! (娘。DOKYU!)	April 5, 2005	May 5, 2006	TV Tokyo
Haromoni@ (ハロモニ@, Haromoni)	April 8, 2007	September 28, 2008	TV Tokyo
Yorosen! (よろセン!)	October 6, 2008	March 27, 2009	TV Tokyo
Otona no Gakuryoku Kentei Special Shōgakkō Kyōkasho Quiz! (おとなの学力検定スペシャル小学校教科書クイズ!)	January 3, 2009		Nippon Television
Bugroo!! (バグルー!!)	February 12, 2009		Nagoya Broadcasting Network
Otameshi ka! (お試しかっ!)	February 23, 2009	March 9, 2009	TV Asahi
Takatoshi no Soratobu Cherry Pie (タカトシの空飛ぶチェリーパイ)	March 10, 2009		TV Tokyo

=== Radio ===
Program	Start date	End date	Station
Regular
Hypernight: Michishige Sayumi Konya mo Usa-chan Peace (ハイパーナイト モーニング娘。道重さゆみの今夜も♥うさちゃんピース)	October 5, 2006	November 24, 2014	CBC Radio
MBS Young Town Dōyōbi (MBSヤングタウン土曜日)	June 9, 2007	Ongoing	MBS Radio
Non-regular
TBC Fun Fīrudo Mōretsu Mōdasshu (TBC Funふぃーるど・モーレツモーダッシュ)	May 2, 2005	May 13, 2005	TBC Radio
TBC Fun Fīrudo Mōretsu Mōdasshu (TBC Funふぃーるど・モーレツモーダッシュ)	May 30, 2005	June 10, 2005	TBC Radio
TBC Fun Fīrudo Mōretsu Mōdasshu (TBC Funふぃーるど・モーレツモーダッシュ)	July 25, 2005	August 5, 2005	TBC Radio
TBC Fun Fīrudo Mōretsu Mōdasshu (TBC Funふぃーるど・モーレツモーダッシュ)	January 22, 2007	February 2, 2007	TBC Radio
Hello Pro Yanen!! (ハロプロやねん!!)	February 27, 2004		ABC Radio
Hello Pro Yanen!! (ハロプロやねん!!)	March 5, 2004		ABC Radio
Hello Pro Yanen!! (ハロプロやねん!!)	June 10, 2005	June 24, 2005	ABC Radio
Hello Pro Yanen!! (ハロプロやねん!!)	December 16, 2005		ABC Radio
Hello Pro Yanen!! (ハロプロやねん!!)	November 3, 2006		ABC Radio
Hello Pro Yanen!! (ハロプロやねん!!)	November 10, 2006		ABC Radio
Hello Pro Yanen!! (ハロプロやねん!!)	December 15, 2006		ABC Radio
Asa Made Hello Pro Yanen!! 2 (朝までハロプロやねん!2)	December 18, 2005		ABC Radio
Asa Made Hello Pro Yanen!! 4 (朝までハロプロやねん!4)	December 17, 2006		ABC Radio
B.B.L.	November 6, 2005	November 13, 2005	
Radio drama
Radio Drama: Drama no Kaze "Girl Driver" (ラジオドラマ ドラマの風「ガール☆ドライバー」)	December 4, 2005		MBS Radio
