= Hello! Morning =

- Genre: Talk-Variety show
- Starring: Morning Musume and other Hello! Project members
- Country of origin: Japan
- Original language: Japanese
- No. of episodes: 354

Production
- Camera setup: Multi-camera
- Running time: 24, 37, 44, and 49 minutes

Original release
- Release: April 9, 2000 – April 1, 2007

Related
- Haromoni@ (2007–2008); Haromoni@, Futarigoto, Musume Dokyu

Hello! Morning (ハロー! モーニング。, harō mōningu) was a weekly Japanese TV show featuring members of Morning Musume, and sometimes other Hello! Project members on TV Tokyo. It was also known by the shorter name of HaroMoni (ハロモニ。). On April 1, 2007, the show ended after seven years of broadcast. A new show featuring the same people, entitled Haromoni@ (ハロモニ@), took its place. The program is best known outside Japan due to the "Dramatic Chipmunk," an online phenomenon video. The video is from the seventh episode of the segment Minimoni Chiccha, with Mari Yaguchi, Mika Todd, Nozomi Tsuji and Ai Kago. In the episode, the girls plan on having a pet so an employee from a pet store brings in some animals for the girls to look over.

== Contents ==
In addition to the segments listed below, many other one-time segments run as well.

- Hello! Project Product segments
  - Hello Pro News (ハロプロニュース, Harō Puro Nyūsu)
  - Hello Pro Wide (ハロプロワイド, Harō Puro Waido)
  - Hello Pro Hour (ハロプロアワー, Harō Puro Awā)
  - Eric Kamezō's Everyday Thanks! (エリック亀造の毎度ありぃ!, Erikku Kamezō no Maido Arii)
  - Scream! Commercial. (絶叫！コマ～シャル。, Zekkyō! Koma~sharu.)
  - Sweat! CM (発汗！CM。, Hakkan! CM.)
  - Hello Pro! Channel (HPC) (ハロプロ！ちゃんねる。, Harō Puro! Channeru.)
- HaroMoni Theater Series (ハロモニ。劇場 シリーズ, HarōMōni. Gekijou Shirísu)
  - "Haromoni Theater, Until the Bus Comes" (ハロモニ。劇場 バスがくるまで, HarōMōni. Gekijou Basu ga Kuru Made)
  - "Haromoni Theater, Mōmamas in the Afternoon" (ハロモニ。劇場 昼下がりのモーママたち, HarōMōni. Gekijou Hirusagari no Mōmamatachi)
  - "Haromoni Theater, The Story of Eki-mae Kōban" (ハロモニ。劇場 駅前交番物語, HarōMōni. Gekijou Ekimae Kōban Monogatari)
  - "HaroMoni Theater, Koen-dori San-chome" (ハロモニ。劇場 公園通り三丁目, HarōMōni. Gekijou Koen-dori San-chōme)
- Penguin Gomaki's Story (ゴマキペンギン物語, Gomaki Pengin Monogatari)
- Sparrow Gomaki's Nursing Diary (ゴマキスズメの子育て日記, Gomaki Suzume no Kosodate Nikki)
- Hawaiian Girls (ハワイヤ～ン娘。, Hawaiya~n Musume.)
- Be a Member of Hawaiian Girls! (めざせ!ハワイヤ～ン娘。, Mezase! Hawaiya~n Musume.)
- Pyōn-Seijin (ぴょ～ん星人)
- Mini Moni - The Way of the Kappa (ミニモニ。河童の花道, Mini Mōni. Kappa no Hanamichi.)
- Mini Moni - The Four Priests (ミニモニ。四休さん, Mini Mōni. Yõn Kyu San.)
- Be a Pioneer by Niigaki's School (魁!!新垣塾)
- Write to the Laughless Princess! (投稿!笑わん姫, Tōkō! Warewa'n Hime)
- Fighters for the Earth W (地球戦士W, Chikyō Senshi W)
- Urōboe Seminar (うろおぼえゼミナーる)
- Turn Dori Chicken (ターン鳥チキン, Tān Dori Chikin)
- World Petit Game (ワールド・プッチ・ゲーム, Wārudo Pucchi Gēmu)
- Take Me on a Date ♥ (私をデートに連れてって♥, Watashi wo dēto ni tsuretette ♥)
- HaroMoni Academy (ハロモニ。アカデミー, HaroMoni. Akademī)
- Mini Moni Chiccha
- Magic Restaurant (マジックレストラン, Majikku resutoran)
