= Qian Lin =

Chinese singer and dancer

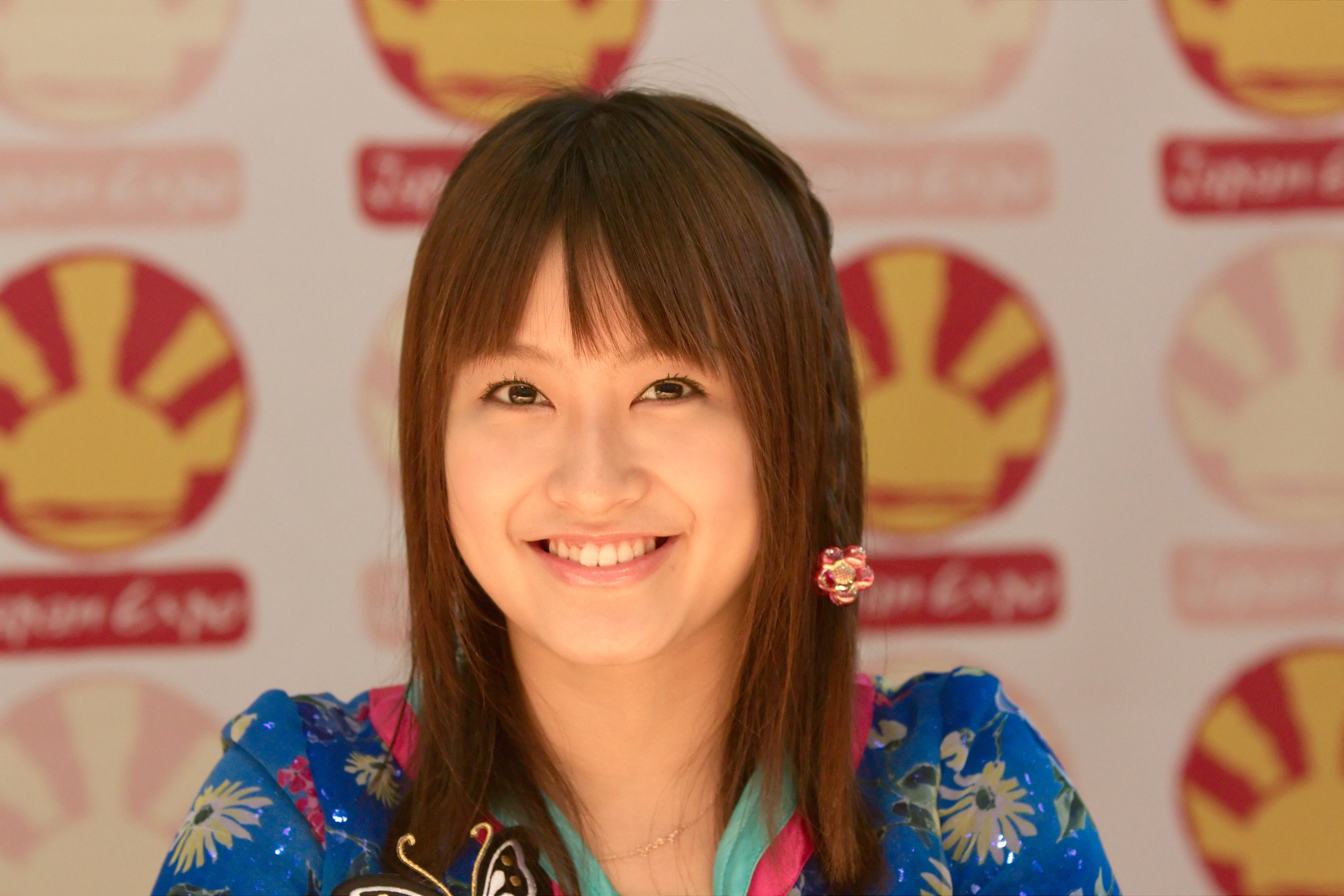
- Japan Expo 2010 at Paris France.

Background information
- Also known as: Lin Lin (リンリン)
- Born: March 11, 1991 (age 35); Hangzhou, Zhejiang, China
- Occupations: Singer; Dancer
- Musical career
- Genres: J-pop
- Years active: 2007 - present
- Label: Zetima
- Formerly of: Morning Musume; Hello! Pro Egg; Shin Minimoni

Qian Lin
- Traditional Chinese: 銭琳
- Simplified Chinese: 钱琳
Transcriptions
Standard Mandarin
- Hanyu Pinyin: Qián Lín

Qian Lin (born March 11, 1991), better known in Japan as Linlin (リンリン), is a Chinese singer. She is a former Morning Musume member and leader of the Hello! Project sub-group Shin Minimoni. She was announced to be joining as the eighth generation of Morning Musume on March 15, 2007. Along with Li Chun, she is one of the only two members in the history of Morning Musume that are of non-Japanese origin.

== Biography ==
Linlin was born in Hangzhou, Zhejiang, China. In the second grade of elementary school (1999), she was spotted by a local television station. Since then, she has been active in the entertainment industry, appearing in many television dramas and other shows as a host in China.

Through the recommendation of a friend of Tsunku, the producer of Hello! Project (which Morning Musume is under), Linlin joined Hello! Project as a part of Hello! Pro Egg, a training center for practicing singing and dancing.

On March 15, 2007, she (along with Junjun) were officially announced to be joining the eighth generation of all girl J-pop group Morning Musume, as a "foreign student". After seeing her perform at concerts, Tsunku was impressed and believed that she and Junjun would be key for Morning Musume's planned expansion into Asia in 2007.

Three days later, on March 18, 2007, she made her Japanese television debut on Hello! Morning. Within the same week, she moved to Tokyo, Japan.

After two years performing with Morning Musume, Tsunku announced on his blog that Linlin would become the leader of the new Minimoni.

In the Morning Musume 2010 ~Rival Survival~ fall concert tour, Linlin graduated from Morning Musume and Hello Project along with Junjun and Eri Kamei. Due to her graduating from Morning Musume and Hello Project, she also left the group Minimoni.

On August 12, 2011, Takamasa Sakurai Tweeted that Linlin and the former Hello! Pro Egg member Akari Saho, would be forming a special unit. They will be performing a mini live at a Harajuku fashion show in Harbin, China.

== Personal life ==
On June 25, 2016, Qian revealed on Twitter that she had been married in November 2014 after three months of dating and gave birth to a child in September 2015.

== Discography ==
=== EPs ===
| # | Title | Release date |
|---|---|---|
| 1 | Zhàn Dòu | 2013-06-19 |
