= Eri Kamei =

Japanese former singer (born 1988)

Eri Kamei 亀井 絵里
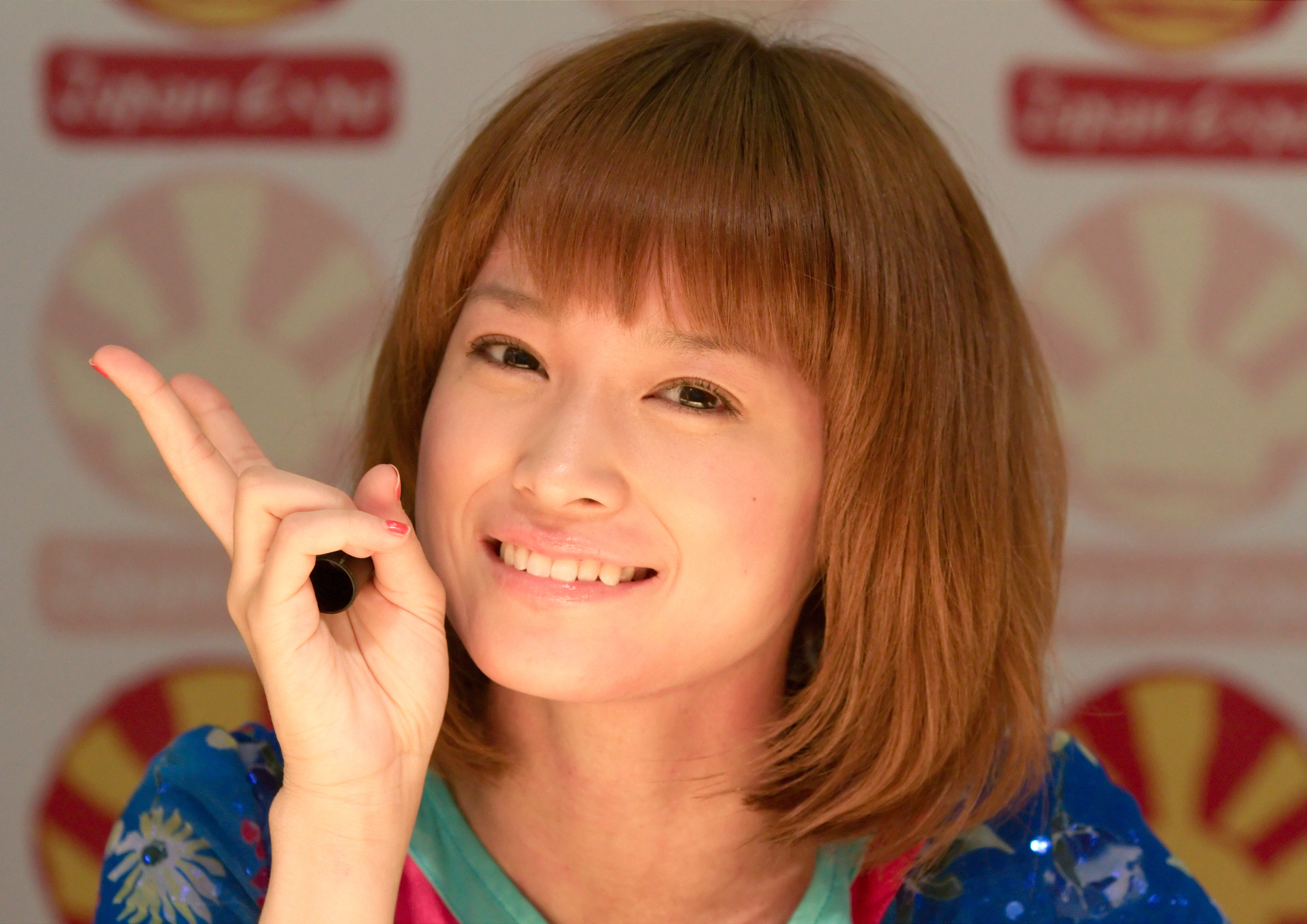
- Japan Expo 2010 at Paris, France

Background information
- Born: December 23, 1988 (age 37); Arakawa, Tokyo, Japan
- Occupations: Singer; Actress; Model; Dancer
- Musical career
- Genres: J-pop
- Years active: 2003–2010
- Label: Zetima

Eri Kamei (亀井 絵里, Kamei Eri; born December 23, 1988) is a Japanese former singer. She is a former member of the Japanese pop group Morning Musume. She joined in late 2003 as a sixth generation member and graduated on December 15, 2010.

== Career ==
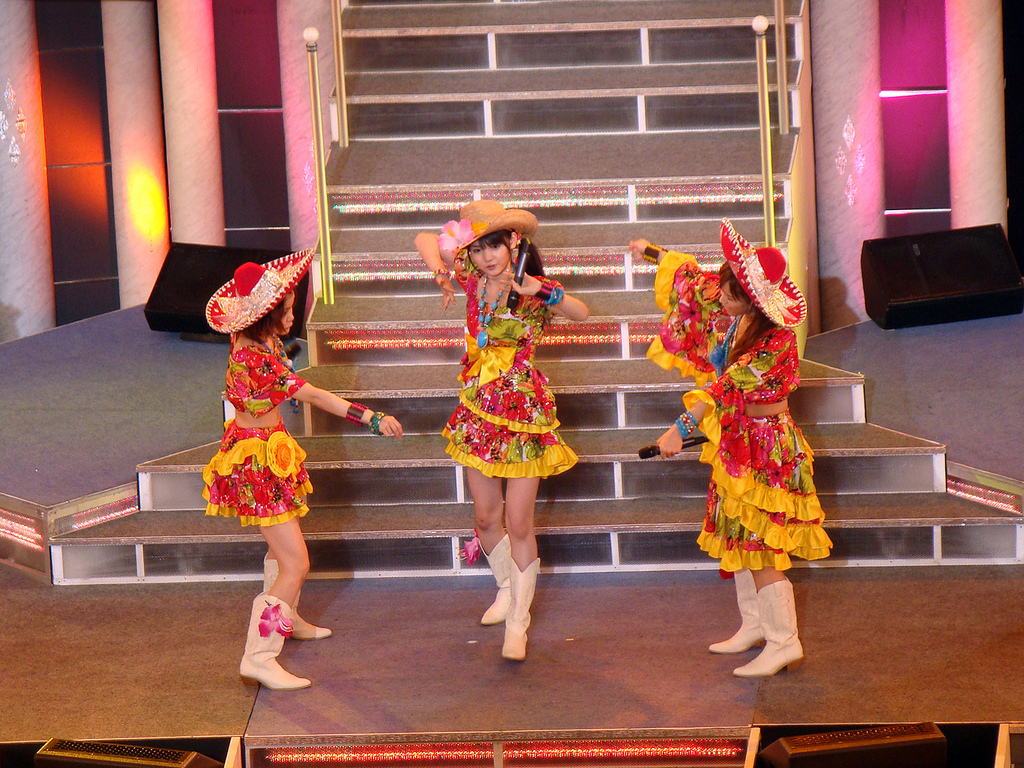
Aika Mitsui (left), Sayumi Michishige (center), and Kamei performing at Morning Musume's Platinum 9 Disc concert tour in May 2009

Kamei was born in Arakawa, Tokyo. She was selected from the Morning Musume Love Audition 2002 to join Morning Musume as a member of the sixth generation. She first appeared on the single "Shabondama" and her first album was Ai no Dai 6 Kan.

Towards late 2004, Kamei is thought to have opened up after receiving her own segment on the Japanese variety show Hello! Morning, where she had been a regular since her debut. In the segment, known as "Eric Kamezō no Maido Arii!" (エリック亀造の毎度ありぃ!), she, along with her co-host Yuko Nakazawa, and most often several guests promote the latest products from the Hello! Project. Her segment was removed from the show in the winter of 2005, but she still stars in the rest of the show as a regular.

In 2004, Kamei appeared in the 2004 Hello! Project shuffle units unit H.P. All Stars. She was also involved in Morning Musume Sakuragumi when Morning Musume was split into two groups.

In 2009, Kamei was put in the group Tanpopo as the fourth generation along with fellow Morning Musume member Aika Mitsui, Berryz Kobo member Yurina Kumai and Cute member Chisato Okai.

On August 8, 2010, Kamei's graduation from Hello! Project was announced by Tsunku on his blog and at that day's Hello! Project concert. Along with Junjun and Linlin they graduated at the end of Morning Musume's 2010 Fall Concert. Kamei performed Haru Beautiful Everyday as her graduation song.

== Personal life ==
Kamei's younger sister is actress Rina Kamei.

== Works ==
=== Photobooks ===
Title	Issue date	Publisher ISBN	Description
Hello Hello! Morning Musume Sixth Generation Member Shashinshū (ハロハロ! モーニング娘。6期メンバー写真集)	July 15, 2003	Kadokawa Shoten; ISBN 4-04-894251-4	Photobook with Sayumi Michishige and Reina Tanaka
Kamei Eri (1st写真集「亀井絵里」)	December 23, 2004	Wani Books; ISBN 4-8470-2837-6	First solo photobook
Days (2nd写真集「DAYS」)	September 16, 2005	Wani Books; ISBN 4-8470-2882-1	Second solo photobook
Seventeen Years Old (3rd写真集「17才」)	May 26, 2006	Wani Books; ISBN 4-8470-2935-6	Third solo photobook
Love Hello! Eri Kamei Photobook in Phuket (ラブハロ！亀井絵里写真集inプーケット)	February 28, 2007	Kadokawa Group Publishing; ISBN 4-04-894486-X	Fourth solo photobook^{†}
Maple	October 11, 2007	Wani Books; ISBN 4-8470-4043-0	Fifth solo photobook, photographed in Vancouver, Canada
Eri (亀井絵里写真集全集「ERI」)	April 3, 2008	Wani Books; ISBN 978-4-8470-4077-1	Photobook complete works
20 (Hatachi) (亀井絵里写真集「20(はたち)」)	December 23, 2008	Wani Books; ISBN 978-4-8470-4147-1	Sixth solo photobook, photographed in Okinawa and Shibuya
Sweet	February 25, 2010	Wani Books; ISBN 4-8470-4242-5	Seventh solo photobook

^{†} An exclusive digital version of this photobook was also released for cell phone users. Entitled Jungle, and retailing for 525 yen, it was released on February 19, 2007. A second batch of photographs was made available on February 21.

=== DVDs ===
Title	Release date	Description
Hello Hello! (ハロハロ!)	July 16, 2003	DVD with Sayumi Michishige and Reina Tanaka
Love Hello! Kamei Eri DVD (ラブハロ!亀井絵里DVD)	March 14, 2007	First solo DVD
20 Dreams (20 DREAMS)	January 14, 2009	Second solo DVD

== Acts ==
=== Movies ===
- Hoshisuna no Shima, Watashi no Shima - Island Dreamin' (星砂の島、私の島～Island Dreamin'～; Released September 29, 2004)

=== Musicals ===
- Ribon no Kishi: The Musical (リボンの騎士 ザ ミュージカル; 2006)
- Cinderella (シンデレラtheミュージカル; 2008) – As Stepsister Portia

=== Television shows ===
Show	Start date	End date	Station
Hello! Morning (ハロー！モーニング。)	June 1, 2003	April 1, 2007	TV Tokyo
Sore Yuke! Gorokkies (それゆけ!ゴロッキーズ)	September 29, 2003	December 26, 2003	TV Tokyo
Futarigoto (二人ゴト)	April 26, 2004	April 28, 2004	TV Tokyo
Futarigoto (二人ゴト)	July 14, 2004	July 22, 2004	TV Tokyo
Majokko Rika-chan no Magical v-u-den (魔女っ娘。梨華ちゃんのマジカル美勇伝)	October 7, 2004	December 15, 2004	TV Tokyo
Musume Dokyu (娘DOKYU)	April 11, 2005	September 1, 2006	TV Tokyo
Haromoni@ (ハロモニ@)	April 8, 2007	September 28, 2008	TV Tokyo
Yorosen! (よろセン!)	October 6, 2008	March 27, 2009	TV Tokyo
Jewelpet (ジュエルペット; as voice of Rinko Kōgyoku)	April 5, 2009	March 28, 2010	TV Tokyo

=== Radio ===
Program	Start date	End date	Station
TBC Fun Fīrudo Mōretsu Mōdasshu (TBC Funふぃーるど・モーレツモーダッシュ)	April 1, 2005	April 15, 2005	TBC Radio
TBC Fun Fīrudo Mōretsu Mōdasshu (TBC Funふぃーるど・モーレツモーダッシュ)	May 30, 2005	June 10, 2005	TBC Radio
Hello Pro Yanen!! (ハロプロやねん!!)	June 26, 2005		ABC Radio
Hello Pro Yanen!! (ハロプロやねん!!)	December 18, 2005		ABC Radio
Hello Pro Yanen!! (ハロプロやねん!!)	June 11, 2006		ABC Radio
Hello Pro Yanen!! (ハロプロやねん!!)	December 17, 2006		ABC Radio
B.B.L.	November 6, 2005	November 13, 2005	FM-FUJI
Gaki・Kame	April 8, 2007	September 27, 2008	FM-FUJI
Five Stars	April 6, 2009	December 13, 2010	InterFM
