= 2nd W =

Studio album by W
- Released: March 3, 2005
- Recorded: 2004–2005
- Genre: J-pop
- Length: 42:50
- Label: Zetimal
- Producer: Tsunku

W chronology
Duo U&U (2004)	2nd W (2005)

2nd W is the second album by the Hello! Project duo W and their first album recorded and released after its members, Ai Kago and Nozomi Tsuji, "graduated" from Morning Musume in August 2004.

Unlike their first album, Duo U&U, which was all cover material, 2nd W contains a mix of originals (composed by mentor and Hello! Project founder Tsunku) and covers of classic Shōwa period female pop duo songs. Three of the songs, the Tsunku originals "Ai Ii na!" and "Robo Kiss" and a cover of The Peanuts's "Koi No Fuga", were released as singles in the months prior to the album; the latter selection was also the single released in advance of the album.

Many of the songs on the album, both originals and covers, center around the topic of becoming, or about to no longer be, the age of seventeen. At the time of the album's release, Ai Kago had turned 17 a month prior, while Nozomi Tsuji would turn 18 that June.

Another track, "Da-bu-ru-yuu Joshi Koutou Gakkou Kouka", is the mock-theme song for the fictional "Dabaruyuu Girls Senior School" (The nonsense word "Dabaruyuu" being a corruption of the duo's name) and ties in with the album cover concept depicting Kago and Tsuji at a school ceremony.

The duo would release one more single while retaining their earlier cute image, "Ai no Imi wo Oshiete!". Their following single, "Miss Love Tantei", would see the pair utilizing a more mature look and sound. The first press of the album comes with three photo cards and comes in special packaging.

== Track listing ==
1. W no Theme (Wのテ～マ) – 1:11
2. Dekoboko Seventeen (デコボコセブンティーン) – 4:05
3. Robo Kiss (ロボキッス) – 3:35
4. Samidare Koi Uta (五月雨恋歌) – 3:48
5. Aa Ii na! (あぁ いいな!) – 3:49
6. Dakishimenaide ~Nikki Tsuki~ (抱きしめないで～日記付き～) – 5:21
7. Da-bu-ru-yuu Joshi Koutou Gakkou Kouka (打武留友女子高等学校校歌) – 3:03
8. 18 ~My Happy Birthday Comes!~ – 4:17
9. Koi no Fuga (恋のフーガ) – 2:19 (The Peanuts)
10. INTERLUDE – 0:24
11. Juushichi no Natsu (十七の夏) – 3:10 (Junko Sakurada)
12. 17sai yo Sayounara (ARRIVEDERCI) (17才よさようなら) – 3:28
13. Mada Mou Chotto Amaeteitai (まだ もうちょっと 甘えていたい) – 4:18

== Musical Personnel ==
- Ai Kago – vocals (lead, harmony and background)
- Nozomi Tsuji – vocals (lead, harmony and background)
- Tsunku – additional backing vocals (Tracks 1, 5)
- Nao Tanaka – Keyboards, drum machine, MIDI programming (Track 1), string arrangement (Track 3)
- Shoichiro Hirata – Keyboards, drum machine, MIDI programming (Tracks 2, 11)
- Manao Doi – guitar (Track 2)
- Hiroaki Takeuchi – backing vocals (Track 2)
- Yohey Tuskasaki – scratching (Tracks 2, 9)
- Yuichi Takahashi – guitar, keyboards, drum machine, MIDI programming (Tracks 3, 4, 7)
- Sting Miyamoto – bass (Tracks 4, 13)
- Atsuko Inaba – additional backing vocals (Tracks 4, 8)
- Hideyuki "Daichi" Suzuki – guitar, keyboards, drum machine, MIDI programming (Track 5)
- Ume – guitar (Track 5)
- Akira – keyboards, drum machine, MIDI programming, additional backing vocals (Track 6)
- Tokyo Philharmonic Chorus – male chorus (Track 7)
- Yoshiaki Nakamura – narration (Track 7)
- Miki Tominaga – narration (Track 7)
- Shunsuke Suzuki – guitar, keyboards, drum machine, MIDI programming (Tracks 8, 12)
- Hideyuki Komatsu – bass (Track 8)
- Hiroshi Iida – percussion (Track 8)
- Yoshinari Takegami – saxophone (Track 8)
- Masanori Suzuki – trumpet (Track 8)
- Wakaba Kawai – trombone (Track 8)
- Koji Makaino – keyboards, drum machine, MIDI programming (Track 9)
- Hideki Oguro – tympani (Track 9)
- Yasuhiko Tachibana – upright bass (Track 12)
- Keiichiro Uemura – drums (Track 12)
- Yoshihiko Katori – vibraphone (Track 12)
- Makoto Hirahara – additional backing vocals (Track 12)
- Cher Watanabe – keyboards, drum machine, MIDI programming (Track 13)
- Yasuo Asai – guitars (Track 13)
- Armin "Takeshi" Linzbichler – drums (Track 13)
