= Mini-Moni Hinamatsuri! / Mini Strawberry Pie =

"Minimoni Hinamatsuri!"

Single by Minimoni

from the album Minimoni Song Daihyakka Ikkan
- Released: January 30, 2002 (JP)
- Recorded: 2002
- Genre: Japanese Pop
- Label: Zetima
- Producer: Tsunku

Minimoni singles chronology
"Minihams no Ai no Uta" (2001)	"Minimoni Hinamatsuri!" (2002)	"Aiin Taisō/Aiin! Dance no Uta" (2002)

"Minimoni Hinamatsuri!/Mini Strawberry Pie" (ミニモニ。ひなまつり！/ミニ。ストロベリ〜パイ) is the fourth single of the Morning Musume subgroup Minimoni. It was released on January 30, 2002, and sold 325,440 copies, reaching number two on the Oricon Charts.

== Track listing ==
All songs written and composed by Tsunku.

1. "Minimoni Hinamatsuri!" (ミニモニ。ひなまつり！)
2. "Mini Strawberry Pie" (ミニ。ストロベリ～パイ)
3. "Minimoni Hinamatsuri! (Original Karaoke)" (ミニモニ。ひなまつり！（オリジナルカラオケ）)
4. "Mini Strawberry Pie (Original Karaoke)" (ミニ。ストロベリ～パイ（オリジナルカラオケ）)

== Members at the time of single ==
- Mari Yaguchi (矢口真里)
- Mika Todd (ミカ)
- Nozomi Tsuji (辻希美)
- Ai Kago (加護亜依)
