= Genki Jirushi no Ōmori Song / Okashi Tsukutte Okkasi! =

"Genki Jirushi no Ōmori Song"

Single by Minimoni

from the album Minimoni Songs 2
- Released: November 27, 2002 (JP)
- Recorded: 2002
- Genre: Japanese Pop
- Label: Zetima
- Songwriter: Tsunku
- Producer: Tsunku

Minimoni singles chronology
"Aīn Taisō/Aīn! Dance no Uta" (2002)	"Genki Jirushi no Ōmori Song" (2002)	"Minihams no Kekkon Song" (2002)

"Genki Jirushi no Ōmori Song/Okashi Tsukutte Okkasi~!" (げんき印の大盛りソング/お菓子つくっておっかすぃ〜, A Large Serving of Energetic Signs Song/Making Sweets is Funny!) is the sixth single of the Morning Musume subgroup Minimoni, jointly credited to Minimoni to Takahashi Ai + 4Kids (ミニモニ。と高橋愛+4KIDS). It was released on November 27, 2002 and sold 53,681 copies. It peaked at number nine on the Oricon Charts in Japan.

== Track listing ==
All songs written and composed by Tsunku.

1. "Genki Jirushi no Ōmori Song" (げんき印の大盛りソング, A Large Serving of Energetic Signs Song)
  - Performed by Minimoni to Takahashi Ai + 4Kids.
2. "Okashi Tsukutte Okkasi~!" (お菓子つくっておっかすぃ～！)
  - Performed by Minimoni.
3. "Genki Jirushi no Ōmori Song (Original Karaoke)"
4. "Okashi Tsukutte Okkasi~! (Original Karaoke)"

== Members at the time of single ==
- Mari Yaguchi (矢口真里)
- Mika Todd (ミカ)
- Nozomi Tsuji (辻希美)
- Ai Kago (加護亜依)
- Ai Takahashi (高橋愛)
