= Mini-Moni Song Daihyakka Ikkan =

Minimoni Song Daihyakka Ikkan

Studio album by Minimoni
- Released: June 26, 2002
- Recorded: 2001–2002
- Genre: Japanese pop
- Label: Zetima
- Producer: Tsunku

Minimoni chronology
Minimoni Song Daihyakka Ikkan (2002)	Minimoni ja Movie: Okashi na Daibōken! Original Soundtrack (2003)

Minimoni Song Daihyakka Ikkan (ミニモニ。ソング大百科1巻) is the first album of the Morning Musume subgroup Minimoni. It was released on June 26, 2002, and sold 187,470 copies.

== Track listing ==
All songs are written and composed by Tsunku, with the exception of "Aiin Taishō", which was written by Hiroyuki Tomonaga and composed by Akihiko Takashima.

1. "Minimoni Jankenpyon!" (ミニモニ。ジャンケンぴょん！)
2. "Minihams no Ai no Uta" (ミニハムずの愛の唄)
3. "Aiin! Dance no Uta" (アイ～ン！ダンスの唄)
4. "Minimoni Hinamatsuri!" (ミニモニ。ひなまつり！)
5. "I Love Blues" (あいらぶぶる～す)
6. "Aiin Taisō" (アイ～ン体操)
7. "Vitamin Busoku Kaishō Kōkyōkyoku" (ビタミン不足解消交響曲)
8. "Haru Natsu Aki Fuyu Daisukki!" (春夏秋冬だいすっき！)
9. "Suki Suki Kirai Kirai Kirai Suki" (すき・すき・きらい・きらい・きらい・すき。)
10. "Minimoni no Dekkai Tabi" (ミニモニ。のでっかい旅)
11. "Okashi no Machi" (お菓子の街)
12. "Minimoni Telephone! Rin Rin Rin" (ミニモニ。テレフォン！リンリンリン)
13. "Chiccha na Chiccha na Onna no Ko" (ちっちゃなちっちゃな女の子)
14. "Mini Strawberry Pie" (ミニ。ストロベリ～パイ)
15. "Ohayōsan (Mata Ashita no Uta)" (おはようさん～また明日の唄～)
16. "Minimoni Bus Guide" (ミニモニ。バスガイド)

== Members at the time of single ==
- Mari Yaguchi (矢口真里)
- Mika Todd (ミカ)
- Nozomi Tsuji (辻希美)
- Ai Kago (加護亜依)
