= Mini-Hams no Kekkon Song =

"Minihams no Kekkon Song"

Single by Minimoni

from the album Minimoni Songs 2
- Released: December 4, 2002 (JP)
- Recorded: 2002
- Genre: Japanese Pop
- Label: Zetima
- Producer: Tsunku

Minimoni singles chronology
"Genki Jirushi no Ōmori Song/Okashi Tsukutte Okkasi~!" (2002)	"Minihams no Kekkon Song" (2002)	"Rock 'n' Roll Kenchōshozaichi (Oboechaina Series)" (2003)

"Minihams no Kekkon Song" (ミニハムずの結婚ソング) is the seventh single of the subgroup Minimoni, their second under the alias Minihams, and their last single with Mari Yaguchi. It was released on December 4, 2002, and sold 60,001 copies, reaching number ten on the Oricon Charts.

== Track listing ==
All songs written and composed by Tsunku.

1. "Minihams no Kekkon Song" (ミニハムずの結婚ソング)
2. "Miniham Kisha" (ミニハム汽車)
3. "Minihams no Kekkon Song (Original Karaoke)" (ミニハムずの結婚ソング（オリジナル・カラオケ）)

== Members at the time of single ==
- Mari Yaguchi (矢口真里) (Last single with Mini Moni)
- Mika Todd (ミカ)
- Nozomi Tsuji (辻希美)
- Ai Kago (加護亜依)
