= Ai no Dai 6 Kan =

Studio album by Morning Musume
- Released: December 8, 2004
- Recorded: 2004
- Genres: J-pop; pop rock; electronica; breakbeat
- Length: 49:20
- Label: Zetima
- Producer: Tsunku

Morning Musume chronology
| Best! Morning Musume 2 (2004) | Ai no Dai 6 Kan (2004) | Early Single Box (2004) |

Singles from Ai no Dai 6 Kan
- 1. "Roman: My Dear Boy" Released: May 12, 2004; 2. "Joshi Kashimashi Monogatari" Released: July 22, 2004; 3. "Namida ga Tomaranai Hōkago" Released: November 3, 2004

Ai no Dai 6 Kan (愛の第6感, Ai no Dai Rokkan; "A 6th sense of love") is the sixth album from the J-pop idol group Morning Musume. The album was released on December 8, 2004.

== Production ==
Ai Kago and Nozomi Tsuji (who graduated from the group in August 2004 to continue with their duo W (Double You) full-time) perform along with the other 12 members of the group at the time on the first two aforementioned tracks, recorded and released as singles when they were a part of the group, and on "Ship To The Future", a song from Morning Musume's Spring 2004 Musical Help!! Atchii Chikyu o Samasunda. Another album track, "Help!!", is also from Help!! Atchii Chikyu o Samasunda; a slower version of the latter was recorded by band members Rika Ishikawa and Sayumi Michishige under the name Ecomoni and released on the compilation Petit Best 5.

== Release ==
The album was released at a pivotal and transitional time for the group, as upon its release in December 2004, it was already known that first generation member and group leader Kaori Iida and fourth generation member, Rika Ishikawa, would be leaving the group within three months of each other — Iida to embark on a solo career and Ishikawa to concentrate on her new group V-u-den. Ai no Dai 6 Kan is also Mari Yaguchi's last album with the group, although she continues to work as a general entertainer under the Hello! Project banner that houses Morning Musume and its many offshoots.

The single "Namida ga Tomaranai Hōkago" (涙が止まらない放課後; "Unstoppable Tears After School") was released on November 3, 2004, on the Zetima label. The single sold a total of 65,873 copies, peaking at #4 on the weekly Oricon chart and charting for seven weeks. The Single V, released on the same day, reached a peak of #5 on the weekly chart and charted for five weeks. Lead vocals for the song are sung by Asami Konno. The theme of the title song is meant to convey the feeling of "the tears of a first love... like Romeo and Juliet." The single was also released in a limited edition which came in special packaging with five photo cards, while the regular and Single V DVD came with one photo card.

The album contains three singles, all released prior to the album between April and December 2004: "Roman: My Dear Boy", "Joshi Kashimashi Monogatari", and "Namida ga Tomaranai Hōkago". A new version of the album track "Chokkan: Toki to Shite Koi wa", entitled "Chokkan 2: Nogashita Sakana wa Ōkiizo!" and featuring some different lyrics as well as new vocals by the post-Mari Yaguchi lineup, is the title track of Morning Musume's 28th single release. A live recording of the original version of "Chokkan..." was released on December 21, 2005, on the Hello! Project compilation Petit Best 6. The first pressing of album came in special packaging with a B3-sized special poster and Hello! Project Photo Card No. 0084.

== Track listing ==
All songs written by Tsunku

1. "Namida ga Tomaranai Hōkago" (涙が止まらない放課後; "After School When Tears Won't Stop") – 3:46
2. "Sukiyaki" (すき焼き) – 3:05
3. "Haru no Uta" (春の歌; "Song of Spring") – 4:16
4. "Joshi Kashimashi Monogatari" (女子かしまし物語; "The Story of Noisy Girls") – 6:00
5. "Chokkan: Toki to Shite Koi wa" (直感～時として恋は～; "Intuition: Sometimes Love Could Be") – 4:15
6. "Dokusen'yoku" (独占欲; "Desire to Monopolize") – 3:46
7. "Lemon Iro to Milk Tea" (レモン色とミルクティ, Remon Iro to Miruku Ti; "Lemon Color and Milk Tea") – 3:31
8. "Roman: My Dear Boy" (浪漫 〜MY DEAR BOY〜; "Romance: My Dear Boy") – 3:56
9. "Koe (声; "Voice") – 5:36
10. "Help!!" – 2:28
11. "Ship! To the Future" – 3:33
12. "Joshi Kashimashi Monogatari 2" (女子かしまし物語２; "The Story of Noisy Girls 2") – 5:08

== Personnel ==
- Shunzuke Suzuki – Keyboards, guitar, drum programming
- Sting Miyamoto – Bass
- Hiroshi Iida – Percussion
- Masatsugu Sinozaki Strings Quartet – Strings
- Yuichi Takahashi – Keyboards, guitar, drum programming
- Atsuko Inaba – Vocals (background)
- Ogu – Vocals (background), drums, percussion
- Koji Makaino – Keyboards, guitar, bass, drum programming
- Hideyuki "Daichi" Suzuki – Keyboards, guitar, bass, drum programming
- Yoshinari Takegami – Brass arrangement, tenor sax
- Futoshi Kobayashi – Trumpet
- Wakaba Kawai – Trombone
- Shoichiro Hitara – Keyboards, guitar, bass, drum programming
- Tomohisa Hawazoe – Bass
- Konta – Soprano sax
- Yukari Hashimoto – Keyboards, drum programming
- Hitoshi Watanabe – Bass
- Yasuharu Nakanishi – Electric piano
- Koichi Yuasa – Keyboards, guitar, bass, drum programming
- Tsunku – Composer, vocals (background)

=== Production ===
- Masakazu Kimura – Mix engineer
- Naoki Yamada – Mix engineer
- Kazumi Matsui – Mix engineer
- Ryo Wakizaka – Mix engineer
- Shinnosi Kobayashi – Recording engineer
- Yuichi Ohtsubo – Recording engineer
- Mitsuo Koike – Mastering engineer
