= Aīn Taisō / Aīn! Dance no Uta =

"Aiin Taisō"

Single by Minimoni

from the album Minimoni Song Daihyakka Ikkan
- Released: April 24, 2002 (JP)
- Recorded: 2002
- Genre: Japanese Pop
- Label: Zetima
- Songwriters: Hiroyuki Tomonaga; Akihiko Takashima
- Producers: Tsunku; Ken Shimura

Minimoni singles chronology
"Minimoni Hinamatsuri!/Mini Strawberry Pie" (2001)	"Aiin Taisō" (2002)	"Genki Jirushi no Ōmori Song/Okashi Tsukutte Okkasi~!" (2002)

"Aiin Taisō/Aiin! Dance no Uta" (アイ〜ン体操/アイ〜ン!ダンスの唄) is the fifth single of the Hello! Project subgroup Minimoni. It was released on April 24, 2002 and sold 212,230 copies.

This single was a collaboration with comedian Ken Shimura in his Baka Tono-sama persona, and was jointly credited to Baka Tono-sama to Minimoni Hime (バカ殿様とミニモニ。姫). A double A-side, its title tracks were both built around the interjection "Aiin!", which Shimura had already established as a catch phrase.

== Track listing ==
The lyrics to "Aiin Taisō" were written by Hiroyuki Tomonaga; its music was composed by Akihiko Takashima. "Aiin! Dance no Uta" was written and composed by Tsunku.

1. "Aiin Taisō" (アイ～ン体操)
2. "Aiin! Dance no Uta" (アイ～ン！ダンスの唄)
3. "Aiin Taisō (Original Karaoke)"
4. "Aiin! Dance No Uta (Original Karaoke)"

== Members at the time of single ==
- Mari Yaguchi (矢口真里)
- Mika Todd (ミカ)
- Nozomi Tsuji (辻希美)
- Ai Kago (加護亜依)
