= Mini-Moni Kazoe Uta (Ofuro Version) / Mini-Moni Kazoe Uta (Date Version) =

"Minimoni Kazoe Uta"

Single by Minimoni

from the album Minimoni Songs 2
- Released: May 14, 2003 (JP)
- Recorded: 2003
- Genre: Japanese Pop
- Label: Zetima
- Producer: Tsunku

Minimoni singles chronology
"Rock 'n' Roll Kenchōshozaichi (Oboechaina Series)" (2003)	"Minimoni Kazoe Uta" (2003)	"Crazy About You" (2003)

"Minimoni Kazoe Uta (Ofuro Version)/Minimoni Kazoe Uta (Date Version)" (ミニモニ。数え歌〜お風呂ば〜じょん〜/ミニモニ。数え歌〜デートば〜じょん〜) is the ninth single of the Morning Musume subgroup Minimoni. It was released on May 14, 2003 and sold 29,088 copies, reaching number nine on the Oricon Charts.

== Track listing ==
All songs written and composed by Tsunku.

1. "Minimoni Kazoe Uta (Ofuro Version)" (ミニモニ。数え歌～お風呂ば～じょん～)
2. "Minimoni Kazoe Uta (Date Version)" (ミニモニ。数え歌～デートば～じょん～)
3. "Minimoni Jankenpyon! (2003 Version)" (ミニモニ。ジャンケンぴょん！～2003ば～じょん～)
4. "Minimoni Kazoe Uta (Original Karaoke)" (ミニモニ。数え歌（オリジナル・カラオケ）)

== Members at the time of single ==
- Mika Todd (ミカ)
- Nozomi Tsuji (辻希美)
- Ai Kago (加護亜依)
- Ai Takahashi (高橋愛)
