= Mini-Moni Telephone! Rin Rin Rin / Mini-Moni Bus Guide =

"Minimoni Telephone! Rin Rin Rin/Minimoni Bus Guide"

Single by Minimoni

from the album Minimoni Song Daihyakka Ikkan
- Released: September 12, 2001
- Recorded: July 2001
- Genre: Japanese Pop
- Label: Zetima
- Producer: Tsunku

Minimoni singles chronology
"Minimoni Jankenpyon!/Haru Natsu Aki Fuyu Daisukki!" (2001)	"Minimoni Telephone! Rin Rin Rin/Minimoni Bus Guide" (2001)	"Minihams no Ai no Uta" (2001)

"Minimoni Telephone! Rin Rin Rin/Minimoni Bus Guide" (ミニモニ。テレフォン! リンリンリン/ミニモニ。バスガイド) is the second single by Morning Musume subgroup Minimoni. It was released on September 12, 2001 and sold 341,560 copies. The single reached #1 on the Oricon weekly chart, charting for sixteen weeks, making it the group's second consecutive single to reach the top spot on the weekly Oricon chart.

== Track listing ==
All tracks are written by Tsunku, arrangement by Takao Konishi.

No.	Title	Length
1.	"Minimoni Telephone! Rin Rin Rin" (ミニモニ。テレフォン！リンリンリン, "Minimoni Telephone! Ring Ring Ring")
2.	"Minimoni Bus Guide" (ミニモニ。バスガイド)
3.	"Minimoni Telephone! Rin Rin Rin (Original Karaoke)" (ミニモニ。テレフォン！リンリンリン（オリジナル・カラオケ）)
4.	"Minimoni Bus Guide (Original Karaoke)" (ミニモニ。バスガイド（オリジナル・カラオケ）)

== Members at time of single ==
- Mari Yaguchi (矢口 真里)
- Mika Todd (ミカ)
- Nozomi Tsuji (辻 希美)
- Ai Kago (加護 亜依)
