= Mini-Hams no Ai no Uta =

"Minihams no Ai no Uta"

Single by Minimoni

from the album Minimoni Song Daihyakka Ikkan
- Released: December 05, 2001 (JP)
- Recorded: 2001
- Genre: Japanese pop
- Label: Zetima
- Producer: Tsunku

Minimoni singles chronology
"Minimoni Telephone! Rin Rin Rin/Minimoni Bus Guide" (2001)	"Minihams no Ai no Uta" (2001)	"Minimoni Hinamatsuri!/Mini Strawberry Pie" (2002)

"Minihams no Ai no Uta" (ミニハムずの愛の唄; lit. Minihams' Love Song) is the third single of the Morning Musume subgroup Minimoni. It was released on December 5, 2001 and sold 325,440 copies, reaching number three on the Oricon Charts.

The group released this under the alias "Minihams" (ミニハムず, Minihamuzu) for a motion picture version of the popular anime Hamtaro. In the film they appear as hamster caricatures of themselves.

== Track listing ==
All songs written and composed by Tsunku.

1. "Minihams no Ai no Uta" (ミニハムずの愛の唄)
2. "Minihamuzun Takatatta!" (ミニハムずんたかたった！)
3. "Minihams no Ai no Uta (Original Karaoke)" (ミニハムずの愛の唄(オリジナル・カラオケ))

== Members at the time ==
- Mari Yaguchi (矢口真里)
- Mika Todd (ミカ)
- Nozomi Tsuji (辻希美)
- Ai Kago (加護亜依)
