= Mirakururun Grand Purin! / Pīhyara Kouta =

"Mirakururun Grand Purin!"

Single by Minimoni

from the album Minimoni Songs 2
- Released: November 19, 2003 (JP)
- Recorded: 2003
- Genre: Japanese Pop
- Label: Zetima
- Producer: Tsunku

Minimoni singles chronology
| "Crazy About You" (2003) | "Mirakururun Grand Purin!" (2003) | "Lucky Cha Cha Cha!" (2004) |

"Mirakururun Grand Purin!/Pi~hyara Kouta" (ミラクルルン グランプリン！/ピ～ヒャラ小唄) is the eleventh single of the Morning Musume subgroup Minimoni. It was released on November 19, 2003 and sold 16,410 copies, reaching number 22 on the Oricon Charts.

This was Minimoni's third single under the alias Minihams, a shared double A-side with Natsumi Abe, who performs the second track as Purin-chan. Like the Minihams, Purin-chan is a hamster character in the anime Hamtaro's third movie.

== Track listing ==
All songs written and composed by Tsunku.

1. "Mirakururun Grand Purin!" (ミラクルルン グランプリン！)
2. "Pi~hyara Kouta" (ピ～ヒャラ小唄)
  - Performed by Natsumi Abe as Purin-chan.
3. "Mirakururun Grand Purin! (Original Karaoke)"
4. "Pi~hyara Kouta (Original Karaoke)"

== Members at the time of single ==
- Mika Todd (ミカ)
- Nozomi Tsuji (辻希美)
- Ai Kago (加護亜依)
- Ai Takahashi (高橋愛)
