= Shabondama (Morning Musume song) =

Single by Morning Musume

from the album Best! Morning Musume 2
- Released: July 30, 2003 (JP)
- Recorded: 2003
- Genre: Japanese Pop
- Length: 12:21
- Label: zetima EPCE-5224 (limited edition); EPCE-5225 (regular edition)
- Songwriter(s): Tsunku
- Producer(s): Tsunku

Morning Musume singles chronology
"As for One Day" (2003)	"Shabondama" (2003)	"Go Girl (Koi no Victory)" (2003)

Music video
- Shabondama on YouTube

"Shabondama" (シャボン玉, Soap Bubbles) is the nineteenth single of J-pop girl group Morning Musume. It was released July 30, 2003 and sold a total of 151,104 copies. It peaked at number two on the Oricon Charts.

== Overview ==
This single marks the debut of the "sixth generation" members Miki Fujimoto (who came from a Hello! Project solo career), Sayumi Michishige, Eri Kamei and Reina Tanaka. Once the sixth generation joined, it made it the group's biggest formation yet, with 15 members. Like "Do It! Now" and "As for One Day", "Shabondama" was used as an image song for Quidam, a Cirque du Soleil show. It was released in two editions, a regular and a limited edition coming with fifteen photocards and comes in special packaging.

== Track listing ==
All lyrics are composed by Tsunku.

=== CD ===
1. "Shabondama" (シャボン玉) – 4:06
2. "Namida ni wa Shitakunai" (涙にはしたくない, I Don't Want This to Make Me Cry) – 4:03
3. "Shabondama" (instrumental) – 4:06

=== Single V DVD ===
1. "Shabondama"
2. "Shabondama (Utae! Shabondama Version)"
3. "Making of" (メイキング映像)

== Personnel ==
- Yuichi Takahashi - arrangement on "Shabondama"
- Shunsuke Suzuki - arrangement on "Namida ni wa Shitakunai"

== Members at time of the release ==
- 1st generation: Kaori Iida, Natsumi Abe
- 2nd generation: Mari Yaguchi
- 4th generation: Rika Ishikawa, Hitomi Yoshizawa, Nozomi Tsuji, Ai Kago
- 5th generation: Ai Takahashi, Asami Konno, Makoto Ogawa, Risa Niigaki
- 6th generation (debut): Miki Fujimoto, Eri Kamei, Sayumi Michishige, Reina Tanaka

SHABONdama Vocalists

Main Vocal: Rika Ishikawa, Ai Kago, Ai Takahashi, Reina Tanaka

Center Vocal: Kaori Iida, Mari Yaguchi, Hitomi Yoshizawa, Risa Niigaki, Nozomi Tsuji, Miki Fujimoto

Minor Vocal: Abe Natsumi, Asami Konno, Makoto Ogawa, Eri Kamei, Sayumi Michishige
