= Lucky Cha Cha Cha! =

Single by Minimoni
- Released: April 21, 2004 (JP)
- Recorded: 2004
- Genre: Japanese Pop
- Label: Zetima
- Songwriter: Tsunku
- Producer: Tsunku

Minimoni singles chronology
"Mirakururun Grand Purin!/Pi~hyara Kouta" (2003)	"Lucky Cha Cha Cha!" (2004)

"Lucky Cha Cha Cha!" (ラッキーチャチャチャ！) is the twelfth and last single of the Morning Musume subgroup Minimoni. It was released on April 21, 2004 and sold 34,398 copies. It peaked at number six on the Oricon Charts. Its title track was used as the theme song to the miniseries Minimoni de Bremen Ongakutai.

== Track listing ==
All songs written and composed by Tsunku.

1. "Lucky Cha Cha Cha!" (ラッキーチャチャチャ！)
2. "Egao no Date Saigo no Date" (笑顔のデート 最後のデート)
3. "Lucky Cha Cha Cha! (Instrumental)"

== Members at the time of single ==
- Mika Todd (ミカ)
- Nozomi Tsuji (辻希美)
- Ai Kago (加護亜依)
- Ai Takahashi (高橋愛)
