= As for One Day =

Single by Morning Musume

from the album Best! Morning Musume 2
- Released: April 23, 2003 (Japan)
- Recorded: 2003
- Genre: J-pop
- Length: 12:54
- Label: Zetima; EPCE-5208 (CD single); EPBE-5066 (Single V DVD); EPVE-5066 (Single V VHS)
- Songwriter: Tsunku
- Producer: Tsunku

Morning Musume singles chronology
"Morning Musume no Hyokkori Hyōtanjima" (2003)	"As for One Day" (2003)	"Shabondama" (2003)

Music video
- "As for One Day" on YouTube

"As for One Day" (Azu fō Wan Dei) is the eighteenth single of J-pop idol group Morning Musume and was released April 23, 2003. It sold a total of 129,893 copies. This single also marked the graduation of second generation member Kei Yasuda. This was the last single to hit #1 until 2006's "Aruiteru". The first pressing comes with a sticker.

== Members at the time of single ==
- 1st generation: Kaori Iida, Natsumi Abe
- 2nd generation: Kei Yasuda (last single), Mari Yaguchi
- 4th generation: Rika Ishikawa, Hitomi Yoshizawa, Nozomi Tsuji, Ai Kago
- 5th generation: Ai Takahashi, Asami Konno, Makoto Ogawa, Risa Niigaki

== Track listing ==
=== CD ===
1. "As for One Day"
2. "Never Forget" (Rock Version)
3. "As for One Day" (Instrumental)

=== Single V DVD ===
1. "As for One Day"
2. "Making Of" (メイキング映像)
3. "Members' Comments" (メンバーコメント)
