= Roman (My Dear Boy) =

Single by Morning Musume

from the album Ai no Dai 6 Kan
- Released: May 12, 2004
- Recorded: 2004
- Length: 11:36
- Label: Zetima
- Songwriter: Tsunku
- Producer: Tsunku

Morning Musume singles chronology
"Ai Araba It's All Right" (2004)	"Roman (My Dear Boy)" (2004)	"Joshi Kashimashi Monogatari" (2004)

Music video
- "Roman (My Dear Boy)" on YouTube

"Roman (My Dear Boy)" (浪漫 〜MY DEAR BOY〜; "Romance (My Dear Boy)") is the twenty-second single of idol group Morning Musume and was released May 12, 2004. It sold a total of 87,255 copies. The single peaked at #4 on the weekly Oricon charts, charting for six weeks.

The single was certified Gold by RIAJ for physical sales of over 100,000 units.

The Single V DVD was also released on the same day. The single was also released in a limited edition which came in special packaging with five B3-sized mini posters.

== Track listings ==
All lyrics are composed by Tsunku.

=== CD ===
1. "Roman (My Dear Boy)" (浪漫 〜MY DEAR BOY〜; "Romance (My Dear Boy)")
2. "Fine Emotion!" (ファインエモーション！, Fain Emōshon!)
3. "Roman (My Dear Boy) (Instrumental)"

=== Single V DVD ===
1. "Roman (My Dear Boy)"
2. "Roman (My Dear Boy) (Close-Up Version)"
3. "Making Of" (メイキング映像, Meikingu Eizō)

== Featured lineup ==
- 1st generation: Kaori Iida
- 2nd generation: Mari Yaguchi
- 4th generation: Rika Ishikawa, Hitomi Yoshizawa, Nozomi Tsuji, Ai Kago
- 5th generation: Ai Takahashi, Asami Konno, Makoto Ogawa, Risa Niigaki
- 6th generation: Miki Fujimoto, Eri Kamei, Sayumi Michishige, Reina Tanaka

Roman~My Dear Boy~ Vocals

Main Voc: Rika Ishikawa, Ai Takahashi, Miki Fujimoto

Center Voc: Mari Yaguchi, Hitomi Yoshizawa, Eri Kamei, Reina Tanaka

Minor Voc: Kaori Iida, Nozomi Tsuji, Ai Kago, Asami Konno, Makoto Ogawa, Risa Niigaki, Sayumi Michishige
