= Joshi Kashimashi Monogatari =

Single by Morning Musume

from the album Ai no Dai 6 Kan
- Released: July 22, 2004 (JP)
- Recorded: 2004
- Genre: J-pop; dance-pop; electropop; surf rock
- Length: 16:01
- Label: Zetima
- Composer(s): Tsunku
- Lyricist(s): Tsunku
- Producer(s): Tsunku

Morning Musume singles chronology
"Roman (My Dear Boy)" (2004)	"Joshi Kashimashi Monogatari" (2004)	"Namida ga Tomaranai Hōkago" (2004)

Music video
- "Joshi Kashimashi Monogatari" on YouTube

Alternative cover

"Joshi Kashimashi Monogatari" (女子かしまし物語; "The Story of Noisy Girls") is the 23rd single by the J-pop girl group Morning Musume. It was released on July 22, 2004. It sold a total of 91,789 copies in the music stores that report to Oricon and peaked at number three on the Oricon Charts.

In July 2004, the single was certified Gold by RIAJ for physical sales of over 100,000 units. It was also released in a limited edition which comes in special packaging with five photo cards, while the regular and Single V DVD came with one photo card.

== Information ==
Producer Tsunku composed the melody and wrote the lyric for "Joshi Kashimashi Monogatari", the release marked the graduation of members Nozomi Tsuji and Ai Kago as they went on to concentrate full-time on their duo W (Double You). The title track is the longest running Morning Musume song to date, and each of the song's 14 verses is an anecdote about each member of the band, sung by different three-to-five-person combinations of band members.

A new version of this song, with each band member singing an anecdote about themselves, is featured on their sixth album Ai no Dai 6 Kan in 2004, and is appropriately titled "Joshi Kashimashi Monogatari 2". This version was recorded after Kago and Tsuji's graduation (although their backing vocals are still present, as a copy of the single version's original digitally-recorded multi-track master was used).

Another version of the song, entitled "Joshi Kashimashi Monogatari 3", is included on their February 2006 album release Rainbow 7, featuring the current members at the time of release.

The coupling track, "Ganbare Nippon Soccer Fight", was written and recorded for the 2004 Japanese Olympic Soccer Team.

In 2011, it was announced that the newly formed group, Dream Morning Musume, consisting of former-Morning Musume members, will redo this song on their upcoming album.

== Track listing ==
=== CD ===
1. "Joshi Kashimashi Monogatari" (女子かしまし物語; "The Story of Noisy Girls")
2. "Ganbare Nippon Soccer Fight"
3. "Joshi Kashimashi Monogatari" (Instrumental)

=== Single V DVD ===
1. "Joshi Kashimashi Monogatari"
2. "Joshi Kashimashi Monogatari (Panic Train Ver.)" (女子かしまし物語パニックトレイン Ver.)
3. "Making Eizō" (メイキング映像; Making Of)

== Performers ==
=== Members ===
- 1st generation: Kaori Iida
- 2nd generation: Mari Yaguchi
- 4th generation: Rika Ishikawa, Hitomi Yoshizawa, Nozomi Tsuji (last single), Ai Kago (last single)
- 5th generation: Ai Takahashi, Asami Konno, Makoto Ogawa, Risa Niigaki
- 6th generation: Miki Fujimoto, Eri Kamei, Sayumi Michishige, Reina Tanaka

=== backing vocal ===
- Tsunku
