= Duo U&U =

Studio album by W
- Released: June 6, 2004
- Recorded: Winter 2003
- Genre: J-pop
- Length: 51:15
- Language: Japanese
- Label: Zetima
- Producer: Tsunku

W chronology
Duo U&U (2004)	2nd W (2005)

Singles from Duo U&U
- 1. "Koi no Vacance" Released: May 19, 2004

Duo U&U (デュオU&U) is the debut album by W, the duo formed by Morning Musume and Mini-Moni members and longtime friends Ai Kago and Nozomi Tsuji. Recorded while they were winding down their duties as Morning Musume and Minimoni members, the album consists of cover versions of songs released by other female Japanese pop duos from the later Shōwa period, including covers of songs by The Peanuts, Pink Lady, and Wink. The idea was that W were continuing the tradition that the original artists they covered on this album established, as well as give fans of Kago and Tsuji that had never heard the original recordings a taste of Japanese pop history.

W promoted the album in Japan with a variety of TV appearances, including a June 2004 special during which they performed alongside Pink Lady as both W and as part of Morning Musume. W and Pink Lady performed the latter's "Southpaw" while the full Morning Musume contingent and Pink Lady performed "Nagisa no Sinbad" and a medley of Morning Musume's "LOVE Machine" and Pink Lady's "S.O.S.".

At the end of July 2004, W "graduated" from (i.e. performed their final concert as members of) Morning Musume, allowing them to concentrate on W full-time. Duo U&U would be the only W album containing all classic J-pop covers, as future single releases would be originals composed by Tsunku and their follow-up album, 2nd W, would contain a mix of original material and more classic J-pop covers.

Duo U&U peaked at No. 4 on Oricon's weekly albums chart.

== Track listing ==
No.	Title	Lyrics	Music	Original artist	Length
1.	"Koi no Vacance" (Koi no Bakansu (恋のバカンス; Love's holiday))	Tokiko Iwatani	Hiroshi Miyagawa	The Peanuts	2:55
2.	"Southpaw" (Sausupō (サウスポー))	Yū Aku	Shunichi Tokura	Pink Lady	3:36
3.	"Nagisa no Kagikakko" ((渚の『・・・・・』(かぎかっこ); The beach's "..."))	Yasushi Akimoto	Tsugutoshi Gotō	Ushiroyubi Sasaregumi	4:15
4.	"Shiroi Iro wa Koibito no Iro" ((白い色は恋人の色; White is the color of lovers))	Osamu Kitayama	Kazuhiko Katō	Betsy & Chris	2:53
5.	"Osaka Rhapsody" (Ōsaka Rapusodī (大阪ラプソディー))	Michio Yamagami	Kōshō Inomata	Unabara Senri & Mari	3:09
6.	"Matsu wa" ((待つわ; I'll wait))	Takako Okamura	Okamura	Aming	4:23
7.	"Samishii Nettaigyo" ((淋しい熱帯魚; Lonely tropical fish))	Neko Oikawa	Masaya Ozeki	Wink	4:38
8.	"Kakemeguru Seishun" ((かけめぐる青春; Roving youth))	Shinichi Ishihara	Tachio Akano	Beauty Pair	3:18
9.	"Nagisa no Sindbad" (Nagisa no Shindobaddo (渚のシンドバッド; Sindbad of the beach))	Aku	Tokura	Pink Lady	2:30
10.	"Koi no Indian Ningyō" ((恋のインディアン人形; Love's Indian doll))	Daizō Saitō	Kyōhei Tsutsumi	Rinrin & Ranran	3:04
11.	"Suki yo Captain" (Suki yo Kyaputen (好きよキャプテン; I like you, Captain))	Takashi Matsumoto	Koichi Morita	The Lilies	3:04
12.	"Sentimetal Boy" (Senchi metaru Bōi (センチ・メタル・ボーイ))	Masao Urino	Daisuke Inoue	Kilala & Ulala	3:42
13.	"Oatsuraemuki no Destiny" (Oatsuraemuki no desutinī (お誂え向きのDestiny))	Daria Kawashima	Kawashima	Key West Club	3:04
14.	"Give Me Up"	Yukinojo Mori	Michael de San Antonio; Pierre Michael Nigro; Mario Giuseppe Nigro	BaBe, Japanese version of Michael Fortunati's "Give Me Up"	4:16
15.	"Jōnetsu no Hana (Passion Flower)" ((情熱の花 (PASSION FLOWER)))	Takashi Otowa; Tetsu Mizushima	Ludwig van Beethoven; Bunny Botkin; Gilbert Garfield; Pat Murtagh	The Peanuts	2:29
Total length:					51:15

- Track 1 arranged by Hideyuki "Daichi" Suzuki
- Tracks 2 and 13 arranged by Cher Watanabe
- Tracks 3 and 6 arranged by Kōichi Yuasa
- Tracks 4, 5, and 15 and arranged by Yuichi Takahashi
- Track 7 arranged by Toshiya Shimizu
- Tracks 8–10 arranged by Yasuo Asai
- Track 11 arranged by Mikio Sakai
- Track 12 arranged by Jun Ichikawa
- Track 14 arranged by Laugh & Peace

== Personnel ==
- Nozomi Tsuji - vocals (lead, harmony and background)
- Ai Kago - vocals (lead, harmony and background)
- Tsunku - additional backing vocals (Tracks 3, 14)
- Hideyuki "Daichi" Suzuki - guitar, keyboards, drum machine, MIDI programming (Track 1)
- Shunsuke Suzuki - guitar (Track 1)
- Osamu Kawakami - upright bass (Track 1)
- Masayuki Muraishi - drums (Track 1)
- Cher Watanabe - guitar (Track 2), bass (Track 2), keyboards, drum machine, MIDI programming (Tracks 2, 13)
- Kōichi Yuasa - keyboards, drum machine, MIDI programming (Track 3)
- Yuichi Takahashi - acoustic guitar (Tracks 6, 11)
- Koji - electric guitar (Track 6)
- Toshiya Simizu - guitar, bass, keyboards, drum machine, MIDI programming (Track 7)
- Yasuo Asai - guitar, keyboards, drum machine, MIDI programming (Tracks 8, 9, 10)
- Shinichiro Mizue - bass (Track 8)
- Ogu - drums (Tracks 8, 10), additional backing vocals (Track 14)
- Yasuaki Maejima - piano (Track 9)
- Tetsutaro Ike - bass (Track 9)
- Hiroki - bass (Track 10)
- Mikio Sakai - keyboards, drum machine, MIDI programming (Track 11)
- Jun Ichikawa - keyboards, drum machine, MIDI programming (Track 12)
- Kaya Uesugi - bass (Tracks 3, 12, 14)
- Atsuko Inaba - additional backing vocals (Tracks 13, 14)
- Laugh & Peace - keyboards, drum machine, MIDI programming (Track 14)

== Charts ==
Chart (2004)	Peak position
Japanese Albums (Oricon)	4
