= Crazy About You (Mini-Moni song) =

Single by Minimoni

from the album Mini-Moni Songs 2
- Released: October 16, 2003 (JP)
- Recorded: 2003
- Genre: J-pop
- Label: Zetima
- Songwriter: Tsunku
- Producer: Tsunku

Minimoni singles chronology
"Minimoni Kazoe Uta (Ofuro Version)/Minimoni Kazoe Uta (Date Version)" (2003)	"Crazy About You" (2003)	"Mirakururun Grand Purin!/Pi~hyara Kouta" (2003)

"Crazy About You" is the tenth single of the Morning Musume subgroup Minimoni. It was released on October 16, 2003 and sold 36,473 copies. It peaked at number five on the Oricon Charts in Japan.

== Track listing ==
All tracks are written and composed by Tsunku.

1. "Crazy About You"
2. "Ren'ai Isshūnen" (恋愛一周年)
3. "Crazy About You (Original Karaoke)" (CRAZY ABOUT YOU (オリジナル・カラオケ))

== Featured lineup ==
- Mika Todd
- Nozomi Tsuji
- Ai Kago
- Ai Takahashi
