= Mini-Moni Jankenpyon! / Haru Natsu Aki Fuyu Daisukki! =

"Minimoni Jankenpyon!/Haru Natsu Aki Fuyu Daisukki!"

Single by Minimoni

from the album Minimoni Song Daihyakka Ikkan
- Released: January 17, 2001
- Recorded: 2000
- Genre: Japanese Pop
- Label: Zetima
- Producer: Tsunku

Minimoni singles chronology
"Minimoni Jankenpyon!/Haru Natsu Aki Fuyu Daisukki!" (2001)	"Minimoni Telephone! Rin Rin Rin/Minimoni Bus Guide" (2001)

"Minimoni Jankenpyon!/Haru Natsu Aki Fuyu Daisukki!" (ミニモニ。ジャンケンぴょん!/春夏秋冬だいすっき!) is the first single by Morning Musume subgroup Minimoni. It was released on January 17, 2001 and sold 763,380 copies. It peaked at number one in Japan on the weekly Oricon chart, charting for seventeen weeks.

== Track listing ==
All tracks are written by Tsunku, arrangement by Takao Konishi.

No.	Title	Length
1.	"Minimoni Jankenpyon!" (ミニモニ。ジャンケンぴょん！)
2.	"Haru Natsu Aki Fuyu Daisukki!" (春夏秋冬だいすっき！)
3.	"Minimoni Jankenpyon! (Original Karaoke)" (ミニモニ。ジャンケンぴょん！（オリジナル・カラオケ）)
4.	"Haru Natsu Aki Fuyu Daisukki! (Original Karaoke)" (春夏秋冬だいすっき！（オリジナル・カラオケ）)

== Members at time of single ==
- Mari Yaguchi (矢口 真里)
- Mika Todd (ミカ)
- Nozomi Tsuji (辻 希美)
- Ai Kago (加護 亜依)
