= Mini-Moni Songs 2 =

Minimoni Songs 2

Studio album by Minimoni
- Released: February 11, 2004 (JP)
- Genre: J-pop
- Label: Zetima
- Producer: Tsunku

Minimoni chronology
Minimoni ja Movie: Okashi na Daibōken! Original Soundtrack (2003)	Minimoni Songs 2 (2004)

Minimoni Songs 2 (ミニモニソングズ2, Minimoni Songuzu Tsū) is the second album (excluding soundtrack albums) of the Morning Musume subgroup Minimoni. It was released February 11, 2004 under the Zetima label with the catalog number EPCE-5265, and peaked at number 11 on the Oricon sales charts.

== Track listing ==
All lyrics and music were written and composed by Tsunku, with the exception of "Rock 'n' Roll Kenchōshozaichi", which was written and composed by Chisato Moritaka.

1. "Opening"
2. "Crazy About You"
3. "Wassup? Enryo ga Thema" (WASSUP?遠慮がテーマ)
4. "Mirakururun Grand Purin!" (ミラクルルン グランプリン！)
5. "Kowarenai Ai ga Hoshii no (Minimoni Version)" (壊れない愛が欲しいの(ミニモニ。Version))
6. "Zukyun Love" (ズキュンLOVE)
7. "Lost Love"
8. "Be All Right! (Minimoni Version) (BE ALL RIGHT!(ミニモニ。Version))
9. "Gyutto Dakishimete (Forever)" (ぎゅっと抱きしめて＜FOREVER＞)
10. "Interlude (Kuro Minimoni Jankenpyon!)" (-INTERLUDE-(黒ミニモニ。ジャンケンぴょん！))
11. "Minimoni Kazoe Uta (Date Version)" (ミニモニ。数え歌〜デートば〜じょん〜)
12. "Rock 'n' Roll Kenchōshozaichi (Oboechaina Series)" (ロックンロール県庁所在地〜おぼえちゃいなシリーズ〜)
13. "Okashi Tsukutte Okkasi~!" (お菓子つくっておっかすぃ〜！)
14. "Minihams no Kekkon Song" (ミニハムずの結婚ソング)
15. "Genki Jirushi no Ōmori Song" (げんき印の大盛ソング)
16. "Ending (Shiro Minimoni Jankenpyon!)" (-ENDING-(白ミニモニ。ジャンケンぴょん！))
