= Best! Morning Musume 2 =

Greatest hits album by Morning Musume
- Released: March 31, 2004
- Recorded: 2001–2004
- Genre: J-pop; dance; electropop; pop rock; bubblegum pop; breakbeat
- Length: 52:49
- Label: Zetima
- Producer: Tsunku

Morning Musume chronology
No. 5 (2003)	Best! Morning Musume 2 (2004)	Ai no Dai 6 Kan (2004)

Singles from Best! Morning Musume 2
- 1. "Morning Musume no Hyokkori Hyōtanjima" Released: February 19, 2003; 2. "As for One Day" Released: April 23, 2004; 3. "Shabondama" Released: July 30, 2003; 4. "Go Girl (Koi no Victory)" Released: November 6, 2003; 5. "Ai Araba It's All Right" Released: January 21, 2004

Best! Morning Musume 2 (ベスト！モーニング娘。2) is the second "best of" compilation from the Japanese female idol group Morning Musume and it was released March 31, 2004, selling a total of 180,897 copies. It contains ten of the A-sides released since the release of Best! Morning Musume 1 in 2002, including several cuts not previously available on any other Morning Musume album; one new song and one popular song from a single.

== Release ==
The album was certified Gold by the Recording Industry Association of Japan for physical sales.

Best! Morning Musume 2 would be the last full-length CD release to feature Natsumi Abe, who graduated from the group earlier in the year. Also, unlike the first singles compilation, graduated members Abe, Maki Goto and Kei Yasuda are all represented both on the cover and in the liner notes. The album comes with a large badge and comes in a special package.

The song "Go Girl (Koi no Victory)" (Go Girl 〜恋のヴィクトリー〜, Go Girl (Koi no Victory)) "Go Girl (Love's Victory)" was released November 6, 2003. It sold a total of 145,340 copies, spent 16 weeks in the Japanese top 200 and peaked at number four. The single was certified Gold by the Recording Industry Association of Japan for physical sales of over 100,000 units.

== Track listing ==
1. "Go Girl: Koi no Victory" (Go Girl 〜恋のヴィクトリー〜)
2. "Do It! Now"
3. "Koko ni Iruzee!" (ここにいるぜぇ!)
4. "Ai Araba It's All Right" (愛あらばIt's All Right)
5. "The Peace!" (ザ☆ピース!)
6. "Mr. Moonlight: Ai no Big Band" (Mr.Moonlight ～愛のビッグバンド～)
7. "Shabondama" (シャボン玉)
8. "Sōda! We're Alive" (そうだ！We're Alive)
9. "As for One Day"
10. "Morning Musume no Hyokkori Hyōtanjima" (モーニング娘。のひょっこりひょうたん島)
11. "Dekkai Uchū ni Ai ga Aru" (でっかい宇宙に愛がある)
12. "Yah! Aishitai" (Yah!愛したい!)
