= Crazy About You =

"Crazy About You" may refer to

- "Crazy About You" (Minimoni song), 2003 single by Minimoni
- "Crazy About You", 1980 song by Adrian Baker
- "Crazy About You", 1988 song by Tomas Ledin
- "Crazy About You", 2000 song by Luna Sea from the album Lunacy
- Aap Ke Deewane (lit. 'Crazy About You'), a 1979 Indian romantic drama film

== See also ==
- "It Ain't Cool to Be Crazy About You", 1986 song by George Strait
- Crazy for You (Madonna song), 1985
