= Koko ni Iruzee! =

2002 single by Morning Musume

Single by Morning Musume

from the album No. 5
- Released: October 30, 2002 (JP)
- Recorded: 2002
- Genre: J-pop, bubblegum pop, pop rock, ska pop
- Length: 13:34
- Label: Zetima
- Songwriter: Tsunku
- Producer: Tsunku

Morning Musume singles chronology
"Do It! Now" (2002)	"Koko ni Iruzee!" (2002)	"Morning Musume no Hyokkori Hyōtanjima" (2003)

Music video
- "Koko ni Iruzee!" on YouTube

"Koko ni Iruzee!" (ここにいるぜぇ!; "I'm Here!") is the sixteenth single of J-pop idol group Morning Musume and was released October 30, 2002 under Zetima Records with the catalog number EPCE-5182.

== Track listing ==
1. "Koko ni Iruzee!" (ここにいるぜぇ!; "I'm Here!") – 4:28
  - Lyrics and composition by Tsunku; Arrangement by Hideyuki "Daichi" Suzuki (鈴木Daichi秀行).
2. "Jun Lover" (純Lover, Pure Lover) – 4:40
  - Lyrics and composition by Tsunku; Arrangement by Kōichi Takahashi (高橋諭一).
3. "Koko ni Iruzee!" (Instrumental) – 4:26

== Personnel ==
- 1st generation: Kaori Iida, Natsumi Abe
- 2nd generation: Kei Yasuda, Mari Yaguchi
- 4th generation: Rika Ishikawa, Hitomi Yoshizawa, Nozomi Tsuji, Ai Kago
- 5th generation: Ai Takahashi, Asami Konno, Makoto Ogawa, Risa Niigaki

=== Musicians ===
Aside from Morning Musume, the following personnel also took part in track 1 ("Koko ni Iruzee!") as background vocals.

- Morning Musume – lead vocals, background vocals (track 1), and chorus (track 2)
- Tsunku – composer, and chorus (track 1)
- Hideyuki "Daichi" Suzuku – programming, and guitar (track 1)
- Kōichi Takahashi – programming, and guitar (track 2)
- Masayuki Muraishi – drums (track 1)
- Takeshi Taneda – bass (track 1 and 2)
- Gen Ittetsu Strings – strings (track 1)
- Naoki Hirata (The Thrill) – trumpet (track 1)
- Akihito Masui – trombone (track 1)
- Yukarie (The Thrill) – saxophone (track 1)

== Charts ==
Release	Chart	Peak position	Weeks in chart
October 30, 2002	Oricon Daily Singles Chart	#1	–
October 30, 2002	Oricon Weekly Singles Chart	#1	16
October 30, 2002	CDTV Weekly Singles Chart	#1	12

== Cover versions ==
=== Tsunku version ===
Two years after the release of the single, Morning Musume producer Tsunku covered the song along with "Mr. Moonlight: Ai no Big Band" (another Morning Musume song) and is featured in his album Take 1.

=== Nozomi Tsuji version ===
"Koko ni Iruzee!"

Single by Athena (Uta: Nozomi Tsuji)
- B-side: "Happy My Friend"
- Released: May 16, 2007 (JP)
- Recorded: 2007
- Genre: J-pop
- Label: Zetima
- Songwriter: Tsunku
- Producer: Tsunku

Former Morning Musume member Nozomi Tsuji released her own rendition of the song on May 16, 2007 as the opening theme of the anime Robby and Kerobby and as her debut single under the same label of the original version. Though the main track is "Koko ni Iruzee!", the coupling track is different and is named "Happy My Friend."

==== Track listing ====
1. "Koko ni Iruzee!" (ここにいるぜぇ!; "I'm Here!")
  - Lyrics and composition by Tsunku; Arrangement by Hideyuki "Daichi" Suzuki (鈴木Daichi秀行).
2. "Happy My Friend"
  - Lyrics and composition by Tsunku; Arrangement by Akira.
3. "Koko ni Iruzee! (Instrumental)"
