= Lehua Sandbo =

- Born: Lehualani Ehukai Sandbo; February 7, 1983 (age 43)
- Origin: Haleiwa, Hawaii, United States
- Genres: J-pop
- Occupations: Beauty pageant titleholder; singer
- Years active: 2000–2002
- Label: Zetima
- Formerly of: Coconuts Musume, Aoiro 7, 7-nin Matsuri
- Website: Official website

Lehualani Ehukai Nahina (née Sandbo, born February 7, 1983, in Haleiwa, Hawaii, United States), known professionally as Lehua Sandbo (レフア・サンボ, Rehua Sanbo), is an American beauty pageant titleholder and former singer. Nahina debuted as a new member of the girl group Coconuts Musume in 2000, before leaving in 2002. After returning to Hawaii, Nahina participated in several national beauty pageants, winning the Miss Congeniality award for the Miss Hawaii USA 2003 competition and becoming Mrs. Hawaii USA in 2008.

== Biography ==
Sandbo had known she wanted to be an actress or singer since a young age. Her first year of high school at St. Francis School in Mānoa, Oʻahu, she was cast as the lead in her school musical.

After being called back for an audition in Waikīkī, Sandbo had sung her rendition of Whitney Houston's "I Will Always Love You" (originally by Dolly Parton). A few days later, she and two other girls were finalists in the auditions. The second part of the auditions required the girls to sing and dance a Coconuts Musume song. Sandbo had shocked everyone when she chose to perform the Japanese version of Dance & Chance. After everything was said and done, Sandbo was picked as the winner.

Sandbo was added into Coconuts Musume in February 2000 to join the three members, Ayaka Kimura, Mika Todd and Danielle Delaunay. Her first recording however was not with the group Coconuts Musume, but with the 2000 Hello! Project Shuffle Unit, Aoiro 7.

The first Coconuts Musume single to be released with Sandbo was "Tokonatsu Musume". After that single, the group had released "Watashi mo "I Love You"", which was also fellow member Danielle Delaunay's last single. After Delaunay's graduation, the three member group only released one more single, "Jonetsu Yuki Miraisen", before Sandbo too was off to graduate.

On February 17, 2002, Sandbo graduated from Coconuts Musume and Hello! Project at the end of the Hello! Project 2002 ~Kotoshi mo Sugoizo!~ concert tour.

Within the same year of leaving Hello! Project, Sandbo was awarded the Miss Congeniality award for the Miss Hawaii USA 2003 pageant. Later, in 2008, she was crowned Mrs. Hawaii USA and competed in the 2008 Mrs. United States pageant, the only nationally televised beauty pageant for married women.

== Personal life ==
Nahina is of Norwegian, Hawaiian, Filipino, Irish, Spanish, and Chinese ancestry. She now enjoys the life of a private citizen in her hometown of Haleʻiwa, Hawaiʻi. She was married to professional longboard surfer, Kapono Nahina, and together they have a daughter, Kaianna Lehualani Nahina. Kaianna is currently 19. She was born on February 4, 2004. In 2016 she remarried to Adrian Kanoa, a deputy. Together they had Ava and Avery Kanoa.
