= Koi no Vacance =

Single by W

from the album Duo U&U
- Released: May 19, 2004 (JP)
- Recorded: 2004
- Genre: J-pop
- Length: 10:50
- Label: Zetima
- Composer(s): Miyagawa Hiroshi
- Lyricist(s): Iwatani Tokiko
- Producer(s): Tsunku

W singles chronology
"Koi no Vacance" (2004)	"Aa Iina!" (2004)

"Koi no Vacance" (恋のバカンス) is the first single of the Hello! Project duo, W. It was released on May 19, 2004 on the zetima label. All three tracks are covers of songs originally recorded by The Peanuts; tracks 2 and 3 are exclusive to this single.

== Track listings ==
CD

1. Koi no Vacance (恋のバカンス) - 2:56
2. Tsukikage no Napoli (TINTARELLA DI LUNA) (月影のナポリ(TINTARELLA DI LUNA)) - 3:00
3. Kanashiki 16sai (HEARTACHES AT SWEET SIXTEEN) (悲しき16才(HEARTACHES AT SWEET SIXTEEN)) - 2:01
4. Koi no Vacance (Instrumental) (恋のバカンス (Instrumental)) - 2:53

DVD

1. Koi no Vacance (恋のバカンス)
2. Koi no Vacance (Dance Shot Ver.) (恋のバカンス(Dance Shot Ver.))
3. Making of (メイキング映像)

== Personnel ==
- Lyrics: Iwatani Tokiko
- Composer: Miyagawa Hiroshi
- Arrangement: Suzuki "Daichi" Hideyuki
- Catalog No.: EPCE-5288 (CD), EPBE-5130 (DVD)
