= Watashi no Natsu =

1993 song by Chisato Moritaka

Single by Chisato Moritaka

from the album Lucky 7
- Language: Japanese
- English title: My Summer
- B-side: "Rock 'n' Roll Kenchōshozaichi"
- Released: April 10, 1993
- Recorded: 1993
- Genre: J-pop; pop rock
- Length: 4:19
- Label: Warner Music Japan
- Composer: Hideo Saitō
- Lyricist: Chisato Moritaka
- Producer: Yukio Seto

Chisato Moritaka singles chronology
"Watarasebashi/ Writer Shibō" (1993)	"Watashi no Natsu" (1993)	"Hae Otoko/ Memories" (1993)

Music video
- Watashi no Natsu on YouTube

"Watashi no Natsu" (私の夏; lit. "My Summer") is the 18th single by Japanese singer/songwriter Chisato Moritaka. The lyrics were written by Moritaka and the music was composed by Hideo Saitō. The single was released by Warner Music Japan on April 10, 1993. The song was used by All Nippon Airways for their "ANA Okinawa" campaign.

Moritaka performed the song on the 44th Kōhaku Uta Gassen.

== Music video ==
The music video and commercial were set in the beaches of Okinawa, with additional scenes of Moritaka singing on a blue screen background displaying the sky, the beach, and a collage of her photos. ANA's campaign sparked controversy when University of the Ryukyus professor Kei Kohana noticed that the sky depicted in the commercial was too blue for an Okinawan summer. ANA and advertising agency Hakuhodo admitted that they sent Moritaka and the film crew to an island near Hamilton Island in Queensland, Australia due to Okinawa having a rainy season between May and June.

== Chart performance ==
"Watashi no Natsu" peaked at No. 5 on Oricon's singles chart and sold 382,000 copies. It was also Moritaka's first single to be certified Platinum by the RIAJ in April 1994.

== Other versions ==
Moritaka re-recorded the song as a slow acoustic version and uploaded the video on her YouTube channel on August 28, 2012. This version is also included in Moritaka's 2013 self-covers DVD album Love Vol. 2. She recorded another self-cover closer to the original and uploaded it on July 5, 2014. The 2014 version is also included in her 2015 self-covers DVD album Love Vol. 7.

== Track listing ==
All lyrics are written by Chisato Moritaka.

8 cm CD
No.	Title	Music	Arrangement	Length
1.	"Watashi no Natsu" ((私の夏; "My Summer))	Hideo Saitō	Saito	4:19
2.	"Rock 'n' Roll Kenchōshozaichi (Single Version)" (Rokkunrōru Kenchōshozaichi (Shinguru Vājon) (ロックンロール県庁所在地 (シングル･ヴァージョン); "Rock 'n' Roll Prefectural Government (Single Version)"))	Moritaka	Moritaka	2:26

Cassette
No.	Title	Music	Arrangement	Length
1.	"Watashi no Natsu"	Saitō	Saito
2.	"Rock 'n' Roll Kenchōshozaichi"	Moritaka	Moritaka
3.	"Watashi no Natsu" (Karaoke)
4.	"Rock 'n' Roll Kenchōshozaichi" (Karaoke)

== Personnel ==
- Chisato Moritaka – vocals, drums
- Hideo Saitō – guitar, bass, synthesizer

== Charts ==
Chart (1993)	Peak position
Japanese Oricon Singles Chart	5

== Certification ==
Region	Certification	Certified units/sales
Japan (RIAJ)	Platinum	400,000^{^}
^{^} Shipments figures based on certification alone.
