= Aa Ii na! =

Single by W

from the album 2nd W
- Released: August 4, 2004 (JP)
- Recorded: 2004
- Genre: J-pop
- Length: 11:31
- Label: Zetima Records
- Songwriter: Tsunku
- Producer: Tsunku

W singles chronology
"Koi no Vacance" (2004)	"Aa Ii na!" (2004)	"Robo Kiss" (2004)

"Aa Ii na!" (あぁ いいな!) is the second single of the J-pop duo, W. It was released on August 4, 2004, under the Zetima label. This was the first single that W released after their graduation from Morning Musume. It is the highest selling single of all of the W singles. This song was used the last ending theme of the 1979 version of the Doraemon anime.

== Track listing ==
1. Aa Ii na! (あぁ いいな!) - 3:51
2. Otome no Keitai Denwa no Himitsu (乙女の携帯電話の秘密) - 3:52
3. Aa Ii na! (Instrumental) (あぁ いいな! (Instrumental)) - 3:48

== Personnel ==
- Lyricist: Tsunku
- Arranger: Shoichiro Hirata
- Catalog No.: EPCE-5308
