= Robo Kiss =

- Single cover

Single by W

from the album 2nd W
- Released: October 14, 2004 (JP); November 17, 2004 (Single V)
- Recorded: 2004
- Genre: J-pop
- Length: 10:33
- Label: Zetima
- Songwriter(s): Tsunku
- Producer(s): Tsunku

W singles chronology
| "Aa Ii na!" (2004) | "Robo Kiss" (2004) | "Koi no Fuga" (2005) |

"Robo Kiss" (ロボキッス) is the third single of the Hello! Project group, W. It was released on October 14, 2004, on the Zetima label, peaking at #5 on the Oricon charts in Japan and charting for five weeks. The Single V, released on November 17, peaked at #17 on the weekly charts and charted for three weeks.

== Track listings ==
=== CD ===
All tracks are written by Tsunku

| No. | Title | Length |
|---|---|---|
| 1. | "Robo Kiss (ロボキッス)" | 3:36 |
| 2. | "Sexy Snow" (Arranged by Yuichi Takahashi) | 3:23 |
| 3. | "Robo Kiss (Instrumental)" (Arranged by Hideyuki "Daichi" Suzuki) | 3:34 |
| Total length: | | 10:33 |

=== Single V DVD ===
| No. | Title | Length |
|---|---|---|
| 1. | "Robo Kiss" |
| 2. | "Robo Kiss (Happy Version)" |
| 3. | "Making of (メイキング映像)" |
