= Rock 'n' Roll Kenchōshozaichi =

1992 song by Chisato Moritaka

Song by Chisato Moritaka

from the album Pepperland
- Language: Japanese
- English title: Rock 'n' Roll Prefectural Government
- Released: November 18, 1992
- Recorded: 1992
- Genre: J-pop; pop rock
- Length: 2:29
- Label: Warner Music Japan
- Songwriter: Chisato Moritaka
- Producer: Yukio Seto

"Rock 'n' Roll Kenchōshozaichi" (ロックンロール県庁所在地, Rokkunrōru Kenchōshozaichi; lit. "Rock 'n' Roll Prefectural Government") is a rockabilly song by Japanese singer/songwriter Chisato Moritaka, from her 1992 studio album Pepperland. Written by Moritaka, the song was released as the B-side of her 1993 single "Watashi no Natsu".

== Background ==
The song's lyrics consist of Japan's prefectures and their capitals, as well as their respective dishes. It popularized the dishes shimotsukare and shiroshita karei, which were not well-known nationwide prior to the release of the song.

At the time of the song's recording, Urawa was the capital of Saitama Prefecture; in 2001, Urawa, Ōmiya, and Yono merged into the new capital of Saitama City. Moritaka's live performances and cover versions of the song have since corrected the line from "Urawa" to "Saitama" to reflect the capital change.

The song has been used by some junior high schools to educate students on their Japanese geography.

On live shows, Moritaka occasionally performs the song on guitar or drums.

== Other versions ==
A remix of the song, titled "Rock 'n' Roll Kenchōshozaichi '95", is included in Moritaka's 1995 greatest hits album Do the Best.

Moritaka re-recorded the song on vocals and drums and uploaded the video on her YouTube channel on December 28, 2012. This version is also included in Moritaka's 2013 self-covers DVD album Love Vol. 3. She recorded a second self-cover of the song and uploaded it on July 18, 2015. The 2015 version is also included in Moritaka's self-covers DVD album Love Vol. 9.

== Mini-Moni version ==
"Rock 'n' Roll Kenchōshozaichi (Oboechaina Series)"

Single by Mini-Moni

from the album Mini-Moni Songs 2
- Language: Japanese
- English title: Rock 'n' Roll Prefectural Government (Memory Series)
- B-side: "Oshaberi Suki ya Nen"
- Released: April 9, 2003
- Recorded: 2003
- Genre: J-pop
- Length: 2:36
- Label: zetima
- Songwriter: Chisato Moritaka
- Producer: Tsunku

Mini-Moni singles chronology
"Mini-Hams no Kekkon Song" (2002)	"Rock 'n' Roll Kenchōshozaichi (Oboechaina Series)" (2003)	"Mini-Moni Kazoe Uta (Ofuro Version) / Mini-Moni Kazoe Uta (Date Version)" (2003)

"Rock 'n' Roll Kenchōshozaichi (Oboechaina Series)" (ロックンロール県庁所在地 ～おぼえちゃいなシリーズ～; lit. "Rock 'n' Roll Prefectural Government (Memory Series)") is a cover version by the Morning Musume subgroup Mini-Moni as their eighth single and their first single with Ai Takahashi as a member of the group. It was released on April 9, 2003 by zetima. This was the first version of the song to reflect the change of Saitama Prefecture's capital from Urawa to Saitama.

The music video features the quartet locked in a classroom when they are told by the school principal via intercom that they must recite all of Japan's prefectures and capitals before going home. After performing the song, they are congratulated by the principal, who attempts to give them another task before they sneak out of the classroom. A second music video, known as the "Lesson Video", features the quartet teaching Japan's prefectures with an animated map. A third video, known as the "Character Version", features the quartet as 3D animated characters with a map of Japan and its prefectures in the background.

The single peaked at No. 7 on Oricon's singles chart, selling 58,084 copies.

=== Track listing ===
CD
No.	Title	Writer(s)	Arrangement	Length
1.	"Rock 'n' Roll Kenchoushozaichi (Oboechaina Series)" ((ロックンロール県庁所在地 ～おぼえちゃいなシリーズ～; lit. "Rock 'n' Roll Prefectural Government (Memory Series)"))	Chisato Moritaka	Yuichi Takahashi	2:36
2.	"Oshaberi Suki ya Nen" ((おしゃべりすきやねん; lit. "Talkative Plow"))	Tsunku	Takahashi	3:14
3.	"Rock 'n' Roll Kenchōshozaichi (Oboechaina Series) (Original Karaoke)" ((ロックンロール県庁所在地 ～おぼえちゃいなシリーズ～ （オリジナル・カラオケ）))			2:39

DVD/VHS
No.	Title	Writer(s)	Arrangement	Length
1.	"Rock 'n' Roll Kenchoushozaichi (Oboechaina Series)" ((ロックンロール県庁所在地 ～おぼえちゃいなシリーズ～; lit. "Rock 'n' Roll Prefectural Government (Memory Series)"))	Moritaka	Takahashi	4:34
2.	"Rock 'n' Roll Kenchōshozaichi (Oboechaina Series) (Lesson Video)" ((ロックンロール県庁所在地～おぼえちゃいなシリーズ～(レッスンビデオ)))			3:03
3.	"Making Video" (Meikingu Eizō (メイキング映像))			6:24

=== Charts ===
Chart (2003)	Peak position
Japanese Oricon Singles Chart	7

== Other cover versions ==
- A cover of the song, along with a karaoke version, was included in Osamu Nishimoto's 2008 picture book The First Japan Map Picture Book ~ 47 Prefectures to Sing and Remember (はじめての日本地図絵本 歌って覚える47都道府県, Hajimete no Nihonchizu Ehon Utatte Oboeru 47 Todōfuken).
- Mariko Takase covered the song in the 2011 children's CD/DVD Let's Learn Utatte! ~ Kuku no Uta, Prefectural Capitals (うたって覚えよう!〜九九のうた、県庁所在地, Utatte Oboeyoō!〜 Kuku no Uta, Kenchōsozaichi).
- Dream5 covered the song as the B-side of their 2012 single "Shekimeki!" (シェキメキ！; lit. "Shake It!").
