= Koi no Fuga =

Single by W

from the album Duo U&U
- Language: Japanese
- English title: Fugue of Love
- B-side: "Furimukanaide"
- Released: February 9, 2005
- Recorded: 2004
- Genre: J-pop
- Length: 8:03
- Label: Zetima
- Composer: Koichi Sugiyama
- Lyricist: Rei Nakanishi
- Producer: Tsunku

W singles chronology
"Robo Kiss" (2004)	"Koi no Fuga" (2005)	"Ai no Imi wo Oshiete!" (2005)

"Koi no Fuga" (恋のフーガ) is the fourth single of the Hello! Project duo W, released on February 9, 2005, on the Zetima label. A Single V DVD containing the music video was released on February 23, 2005. It peaked at number 12 on Oricon Singles Chart.

The song "Koi no Fuga" is a cover of a song originally released by The Peanuts in August 1967; "Furimukanaide" is also a song first recorded by The Peanuts, but was also covered in the 80s by Wink, and by Yuki Koyanagi in 2003. It was also parodied in the Super Sentai Series Engine Sentai Go-Onger.

== Track listings ==
No.	Title	Lyrics	Music	Arrangement	Length
1.	"Koi no Fuga" ((恋のフーガ; "Fugue of Love"))	Rei Nakanishi	Koichi Sugiyama	Koji Makaino	2:33
2.	""Furimukanaide"" ((ふりむかないで; "Can't Turn Back))	Tokiko Iwatani	Hiroshi Miyagawa	Koji Makaino	3:00

=== CD ===
1. "Koi no Fuga" (恋のフーガ; "Fugue of Love") - 2:33
2. "Furimukanaide" (ふりむかないで; "Can't Turn Back") - 3:00
3. "Koi no Fuga (Instrumental)" (恋のフーガ(Instrumental)) - 2:30

=== DVD ===
1. Koi no Fuga (恋のフーガ) - 2:37
2. Koi no Fuga (Dance Shot Ver.) (恋のフーガ(Dance Shot Ver.)) - 2:39
3. Making of (メイキング映像) - 12:14
