= No. 5 (Morning Musume album) =

No.5

Studio album by Morning Musume
- Released: March 26, 2003
- Recorded: 2002–2003
- Genre: J-pop; dance-pop; electropop; pop rock; bubblegum pop
- Length: 50:11
- Label: Zetima
- Producer: Tsunku

Morning Musume chronology
4th Ikimasshoi! (2002)	No.5 (2003)	Best! Morning Musume 2 (2004)

Singles from No.5
- 1. "Do It! Now" Released: July 24, 2002; 2. "Koko ni Iruzee!" Released: October 30, 2002

No. 5 (Number 5) is the fifth album from the J-pop idol group Morning Musume, released on March 26, 2003.

== Overview ==
No. 5 is the last studio album to feature second generation member Kei Yasuda and first generation member Natsumi Abe as full members of the group. Yasuda graduated later in 2003, and Abe graduated in early 2004. It is also the first Morning Musume studio album to feature a former member as a returning guest artist, as Maki Goto guests on "Megami ~Mousse na Yasashisa~" and "Ganbacchae" (as well as appears on "Do It! Now", her last single as a member of the band).

Two of the songs, "Megami ~Mousse na Yasashisa~" and "Yes! Pocky Girls", are credited to two one-time Morning Musume spinoff groups, "Venus Mousse" and "Pocky Girls", respectively. The songs originated as promotional songs for Pocky biscuit snacks and appeared in versions that are least one minute shorter on the Petit Best 3 compilation album in December 2002. The first pressing came in special packaging with a photobook and a special mini poster.

== Track listing ==
1. "Intro"
2. "Do it! Now"
3. "Top!"
4. "Tomodachi ga Ki ni Itte Iru Otoko Kara no Dengon" (友達(♀)が気に入っている男からの伝言)
5. "Koko ni Iruzee! (ここにいるぜぇ！)
6. "'Suggoi Nakama'" (「すっごい仲間」)
7. "Tsuyoki de Ikōze" (強気で行こうぜ！)
8. "Megami ~Mousse na Yasashisa~ (Original Long Version)" (女神～Mousseな優しさ～(Original long version))
9. "Yes! Pocky Girls (Original Long Version)"
10. "Hey! Mirai" (Hey！未来)
11. "Ganbacchae!" (がんばっちゃえ！)
12. "'Sugoku Sukina no ni... ne'" (「すごく好きなのに…ね」)
13. "Sotsugyou Ryokō ~Morning Musume Tabidatsu Hito ni Okuru Uta~" (卒業旅行～モーニング娘。旅立つ人に贈る唄～)

== Certification ==
- Platinum (RIAJ)
