= Ai no Imi o Oshiete! =

Single by W
- Released: May 18, 2005 (JP)
- Genre: Japanese pop
- Length: 10:53
- Label: Zetima
- Producer(s): Tsunku

W singles chronology
| "Koi no Fuga" (2005) | "Ai no Imi o Oshiete!" (2005) | "Miss Love Tantei" (2005) |

"Ai no Imi o Oshiete!" (愛の意味を教えて!, Teach Me the Meaning of Love) is the fifth single of the Hello! Project group W, released on May 18, 2005.

== Track listing ==
1. Ai no Imi o Oshiete! (愛の意味を教えて!, Teach Me the Meaning of Love)
2. Jinx (ジンクス)
3. Ai no Imi o Oshiete! (Instrumental)
