= Miss Love Tantei =

Single by W
- A-side: "Miss Love Tantei"
- B-side: "Friendship"
- Released: September 7, 2005 (CD single); September 14, 2005 (DVD single)
- Recorded: 2005
- Genre: J-pop
- Length: 10:26
- Label: Zetima
- Songwriter(s): Steven Lee, Joey Carbone
- Producer(s): Tsunku

W singles chronology
"Ai no Imi wo Oshiete!" (2005)	"Miss Love Tantei" (2005)	"Dō ni mo Tomaranai / Choi Waru Devil" (2019)

Limited edition with DVD
- Front cover of limited edition DVD.

Music video
- "Miss Love Tantei" on YouTube

"Miss Love Tantei" (Missラブ探偵, lit. Miss Love Detective) is the 6th single of W, released on September 7, 2005.

== Background and release ==
"Miss Love Tantei" was composed by Los Angeles producers Joey Carbone and Steven Lee, the first time a songwriting team other than W's main producer, Tsunku, had written an original song for them.

The single was released on September 7, 2005 under the Zetima label. "Friendship" was included as a B-side. A video single, referred as a "Single V", was released on September 14, 2005.

== Music video ==
The music video was directed by Hideo Kawatani and produced by Tetsushi Suehiro. The music video stars Tsuji and Kago as a multitude of characters, including Cara and Mel, their characters from their 2005 musical, Mysterious Girl Detectives Cara & Mel: The Case of the Stolen Dangerous Violin, as they solve the mystery behind a stolen jewel.

== Reception ==
Both the CD and DVD singles debuted at #13 in the Oricon Weekly Singles and DVD Charts and charted for 4 weeks.

CD Journal praised the change in songwriting direction, calling "Miss Love Tantei" a "danceable track", as well as the rap interlude and the first press edition photo card "cute."

== Track listing ==
=== Single ===
All tracks are written by Joey Carbone

No.	Title	Lyrics	Music	Arrangement	Length
1.	"Miss Love Tantei (Missラブ探偵, Miss Rabu Tantei)"	Mera Morimura	Joey Carbone, Steven Lee	Moto G3	3:20
2.	"Friendship"	Mera Morimura	Joey Carbone	Moto G3	3:47
3.	"Miss Love Tantei" (Instrumental)	—	Joey Carbone, Steven Lee	Moto G3	3:19
Total length:					10:26

=== DVD single ===
No.	Title	Length
1.	"Miss Love Tantei"
2.	"Miss Love Tantei" (Dance Shot Ver.)
3.	"Making Of (メイキング映像)"

== Charts ==
=== Single ===
Chart	Peak position
Oricon Weekly Singles Chart	13

=== DVD single ===
Chart	Peak position
Oricon Weekly DVD Chart	13
