= Mini-Moni =

Japanese idol girl group

Mini-Moni ミニモニ。
- Mini-Moni, promoting "Lucky Cha Cha Cha!", 2003. From L to R: Nozomi Tsuji, Mika, Ai Takahashi and Ai Kago

Background information
- Also known as: Baka Tono-sama to Mini-Moni Hime; Mini-Hamus
- Origin: Tokyo, Japan
- Genres: J-pop
- Years active: 2000–2004
- Label: Zetima
- Spinoffs: Shin Mini-Moni
- Spinoff of: Morning Musume; Coconuts Musume
- Past members: Mari Yaguchi; Mika; Ai Kago; Nozomi Tsuji; Ai Takahashi
- Website: www.helloproject.com

Mini-Moni (ミニモニ。; stylized as mini-moni.) was a sub-unit of the Japanese idol girl groups Morning Musume and Coconuts Musume. It was formed by Up-Front Promotion in 2000 and associated with Hello! Project. The group was founded by Morning Musume members Mari Yaguchi, Nozomi Tsuji, and Ai Kago, with Coconuts Musume member Mika later added as a member. After Yaguchi's departure in 2002, Morning Musume member Ai Takahashi was added into the group.

Throughout their career, Mini-Moni appeared in media aimed at children, having two animated series from 2001 to 2002, variety shows, as well as a 2002 film based on their stage personas titled Mini-Moni the Movie: Okashi na Daibōken!. In addition to that, they also performed the theme songs to the Hamtaro movies under the name Mini-Hamus (ミニハムず).

The group later disbanded in 2004, after Todd left Hello! Project and Tsuji and Kago left Morning Musume to debut in W. In 2009, Mini-Moni was revived as a Hello! Project Shuffle Unit and concert-only unit under the name Shin Mini-Moni; the group had new members and remained active until 2011.

== History ==
=== 2000–2004: Formation ===
The group was founded in late 2000 by Morning Musume member Mari Yaguchi, with the concept of having members 150 cm (4 ft 11 in) and shorter. Together with Morning Musume's songwriter and producer, Tsunku, she selected two new members, Ai Kago and Nozomi Tsuji and the trio began performing in concerts as Mini-Moni. Mika from Coconuts Musume was later added to the group. They made their official CD debut with "Mini-Moni Jankenpyon! / Haru Natsu Aki Fuyu Daisukki!" in 2001, which became a #1 hit.

The quartet released several singles in 2001 and 2002, with most of these tracks compiled on their first album Mini-Moni Song Daihyakka Ikkan. Simultaneous to their single releases, the band became the subject of a series of short cartoons, Mini-Moni Yaru no da Pyon!, voicing their own characters. They also contributed their voices to a string of movies based on the Hamtaro cartoon series, which featured a hamster version of Mini-Moni known as Mini-Hamus.

All five members of Mini-Moni in a still from Okashi na Daibōken (2002).

In 2002, Yaguchi graduated from Mini-Moni to take on the leadership of the subgroup ZYX. Ai Takahashi was added as a member, while Mika Todd, took over Yaguchi's place as the band's leader. That same year, all members of Mini-Moni starred in the film Mini-Moni the Movie: Okashi na Daibōken!, a fictional account explaining the change in members.

Afterwards, Mini-Moni released "Crazy About You" and later the album Mini-Moni Songs 2. They also starred in a mini-series called Mini-Moni de Bremen no Ongakutai starring Takahashi, Tsuji, and Kago; Mika Todd made brief appearances in two episodes. The group disbanded in May 2004 at Mika Todd's graduation concert, following the release of a final single, "Lucky Cha Cha Cha!"

=== 2018–present: Post Mini-Moni activities ===
On 12 February 2018, TV Tokyo aired a television special celebrating Mini-Moni's 20th anniversary. Yaguchi and Tsuji made an appearance and performed "Mini-Moni Jankenpyon!" with Morning Musume '18 members Ayumi Ishida and Reina Yokoyama.

== Members ==
- Mari Yaguchi (2000-2003)
- Nozomi Tsuji (2000-2004)
- Ai Kago (2000-2004)
- Mika Todd (2000-2004)
- Ai Takahashi (2003-2004)

== Legacy ==
In June 2007, an excerpt from a November 2000 episode of Mini-Moni Chiccha (their segment on Hello! Project's variety show Hello! Morning) of a prairie dog suddenly turning his head became the basis for the Internet phenomenon the Dramatic Chipmunk. A parody of the Dramatic Chipmunk clip, including lookalikes of Mini-Moni, appears in Weezer's music video for their 2008 single "Pork and Beans".

=== Shin Mini-Moni ===
On 26 May 2009, Yaguchi posted on her blog discussing how the head producer of Hello! Project, Tsunku, had contacted her asking for permission to bring the group out of hiatus. Tsunku confirmed on his own blog that Mini-Moni would be revived as a Hello! Project Shuffle Unit with an entirely new line-up, announcing then-Smileage member Kanon Fukuda as the first member. He later announced then-Morning Musume member Linlin as the group's leader, with then-Hello Pro Egg trainees Akari Takeuchi and Karin Miyamoto as the final two members. The group, rebranded as Shin Mini-Moni (新ミニモニ。; lit. New Mini-Moni), released songs for Hello! Project's compilation albums Champloo 1: Happy Marriage Song Cover Shū and Petit Best 10. The group was also active as a concert-only unit until 2011.

== Discography ==
=== Studio albums ===
Title	Year	Album details	Peak chart positions	Sales	Certifications
Title	Year	Album details	JPN	Sales	Certifications
Mini-Moni Song Daihyakka Ikkan (ミニモニ。ソング大百科1巻)	2002	Released: 26 June 2002; Label: Zetima; Formats: CD	4	JPN: 200,000+	RIAJ: Gold
Mini-Moni Songs 2 (ミニモニ。ソングズ2)	2004	Released: 11 February 2004; Label: Zetima; Formats: CD	11	—	—N/a
"—" denotes releases that did not chart or were not released in that region.

=== Singles ===
Title	Year	Peak chart positions	Sales	Album	Certifications
Title	Year	JPN	Sales	Album	Certifications
"Mini-Moni Jankenpyon!" (ミニモニ。ジャンケンぴょん！) / "Haru Natsu Aki Fuyu Daisukki!" (春夏秋冬だいすっき!)	2001	1	JPN: 800,000+	Mini-Moni Song Daihyakka Ikkan	RIAJ: Double Platinum
"Mini-Moni Telephone! Rin Rin Rin" (ミニモニ。テレフォン！リンリンリン) / "Mini-Moni Bus Guide" (ミニモニ。バスガイド!)	2001	1	JPN: 400,000+	Mini-Moni Song Daihyakka Ikkan	RIAJ: Platinum
"Mini-Hams no Ai no Uta" (ミニハムずの愛の唄) (as Mini-Hamus)	2001	3	—	Mini-Moni Song Daihyakka Ikkan	—N/a
"Mini-Moni Hinamatsuri!" (ミニモニ。ひなまつり！) / "Mini Strawberry Pie" (ミニ。ストロベリ〜パイ)	2002	2	JPN: 200,000+	Mini-Moni Song Daihyakka Ikkan	RIAJ: Gold
"Aīn Taisō" (アイ〜ン体操) / "Aīn! Dance no Uta" (アイ〜ン!ダンスの唄) (as Bakatono-sama with Mini-Moni Hime)	2002	3	JPN: 200,000+	Mini-Moni Song Daihyakka Ikkan	RIAJ: Gold
"Genki Jirushi no Ōmori Song" (げんき印の大盛りソング) / "Okashi Tsukutte Okkasi!" (お菓子つくっておっかすぃ〜) (as Mini-Moni + Ai Takahashi & 4Kids)	2002	9	—	Mini-Moni Songs 2	—N/a
"Mini-Hams no Kekkon Song" (ミニハムずの結婚ソング) (as Mini-Hamus)	2002	10	—	Mini-Moni Songs 2	—N/a
"Rock 'n' Roll Kenchōshozaichi (Oboechaina Series)" (ロックンロール県庁所在地〜おぼえちゃいなシリーズ〜)	2003	7	—	Mini-Moni Songs 2	—N/a
"Mini-Moni Kazoe Uta (Ofuro Version)" (ミニモニ。数え歌〜お風呂ば〜じょん〜) / "Mini-Moni Kazoe Uta (Date Version)" (ミニモニ。数え歌〜デートば〜じょん〜)	2003	9	—	Mini-Moni Songs 2	—N/a
"Crazy About You"	2003	5	—	Mini-Moni Songs 2	—N/a
"Lucky Cha Cha Cha!" (ラッキーチャチャチャ！)	2004	6	—	Non-album single	—N/a
"—" denotes releases that did not chart or were not released in that region.

=== Soundtrack appearances ===
Title	Year	Peak chart positions	Sales	Album
Title	Year	JPN	Sales	Album
"Mirakururun Grand Purin!" (ミラクルルン グランプリン!) (Note: "Mirakururun Grand Purin!" was released as a double A-side single with "Pīhyara Kouta" (performed by Natsumi Abe under her character's name, Purin). The sales and Oricon ranking reflects both songs.) (as Mini-Hamus)	2003	22	—	Mini-Moni Songs 2
"—" denotes releases that did not chart or were not released in that region.

== Filmography ==
=== Television ===
Year	Title	Role	Network	Notes
2000-2004	Hello! Morning	Themselves	TV Tokyo	Morning Musume's variety show
2001	Mini-Moni Yaru no da Pyon!	Themselves	TV Tokyo	Voice in anime; segments in Oha Star
2003	Mini-Moni the TV	Themselves	TV Tokyo	Voice in anime
2002-2004	Hello Kids	Themselves	TV Tokyo	Mini-Moni's variety show

=== Films ===
Year	Title	Role	Notes
2001	Hamtaro: Adventures in Ham-Ham Land	Themselves	Voice in anime film; cameo
2002	Hamtaro: The Captive Princess	Themselves	Voice in anime film; cameo
2002	Mini-Moni the Movie: Okashi na Daibōken!	Themselves	
2003	Hamtaro: Miracle in Aurora Valley	Themselves	Voice in anime film; cameo

== Video games ==
- Mini-Moni: Dice de Pyon! (Konami, 20 March 2002, PlayStation)
- Mini-Moni ni Naru no da Pyon! (Bandai, 26 September 2002, PlayStation)
- Mini-Moni: Shaka tto Tambourine! Dapyon! (Sega, 19 September 2002, PlayStation)
- Mini-Moni: Step Up Pyon Pyon Pyon (Konami, 12 December 2002, PlayStation)
- Mini-Moni HapiMoni: Mika no Happy Morning chatty (Shogakukan, Game Boy Advance)
- Mini-Moni: Onegai Ohoshi-sama (Game Boy Advance)
