= W (duo) =

Japanese pop duo

- W, 2005; From left: Kago and Tsuji

Background information
- Origin: Tokyo, Japan
- Genre: J-pop
- Years active: 2004–2007; 2019
- Label: Zetima
- Spinoff of: Morning Musume
- Past members: Ai Kago; Nozomi Tsuji

W was a Japanese duo formed in 2004 by Up-Front Promotion and associated with Hello! Project. The members consisted of Nozomi Tsuji and Ai Kago, former 4th generation members of the idol girl group Morning Musume. Tsuji and Kago had previously achieved fame through being in the group and the sub-group Mini-Moni.

W's formation was announced at the same time as Tsuji and Kago's planned departure from Morning Musume. Prior to their official departure, they debuted with several cover versions of kayōkyoku songs, including their debut single, "Koi no Vacance" (2004) and their first album, Duo U&U (2004). After leaving Morning Musume, W released their first original song, "Aa Ii na!" (2004), followed by "Robo Kiss" (2004). In 2005, W starred in their first musical, Mysterious Girl Detectives Cara & Mel: The Case of the Stolen Dangerous Violin (2005). They reprised the roles of their characters with the release of "Miss Love Tantei" (2005).

In 2006, W's activities were halted after Kago was suspended for underage smoking. While there were plans for W to make a comeback in 2007, Kago's contract was terminated after more photos of her dating and smoking underage were reported in the media, leading to W's disbandment.

In 2019, W briefly reunited to make a concert appearance celebrating Hello! Project's 20th anniversary, and "Choi Waru Devil" (2019), a single containing music from their previously cancelled releases, "Dō ni mo Tomaranai" and W3: Faithful, was released in the same year.

== Name ==
Tsunku, Hello! Project's producer, had selected the name "W" because the origin of the name meant "two Us" and "gave off the feeling of two You's", symbolizing Tsuji and Kago's dual nature.

== History ==
=== 2004: Formation and debut ===
In 2004, W's formation was announced shortly after Nozomi Tsuji and Ai Kago's graduations from Morning Musume. Tsuji and Kago had previously worked together in one of Morning Musume's sub-units, Mini Moni, as a side project. Both members had been known as the "Twins" and had been some of Morning Musume's most popular members since joining the group at age 12. W released their debut three-song EP, Koi no Vacance, the title track being a cover version of The Peanuts' 1960 song. The EP was followed a few weeks later by their debut album as W, Duo U&U, which contained covers of other Shōwa period female duo songs exclusively. One of the other groups covered by W on the first album was Pink Lady. Pink Lady were invited to perform with W on Japanese television as a one-time four-piece ensemble.

Kago and Tsuji performed their graduation concert (final performance as members of Morning Musume) in August 2004; a week later, their second single "Aa Ii na!" was released. Not only was it the duo's first release since they departed Morning Musume, it was also the first W single to feature an original composition by Hello! Project founder and producer Tsunku. A third single of original material, "Robo Kiss", followed three months later.

In December 2004, W joined their fellow Hello! Project members on the 2004 shuffle unit single "All for One and One for All", credited to the H.P. All Stars. W also began joining Morning Musume onstage at concerts during this period to perform Kago and Tsuji's final Morning Musume single, "Joshi Kashimashi Monogatari" together with their former bandmates.

=== 2005: Rise to popularity ===
W's second album, 2005's 2nd W, released in March 2005, contained Shōwa period J-pop cover songs as well as original songs. Afterwards, they released "Ai no Imi o Oshiete!"

In the spring of 2005, W starred in their first stage musical, Cara & Mel: the Case of the Stolen Dangerous Violin, at Yokohama Blitz in Yokohama and Ikebukuro Sun Shine Theater in Ikebukuro, Tokyo, from March 18, 2005, to April 10, 2005. In September 2005 the duo released their 6th single "Miss Love Tantei". The video, which features Kago and Tsuji playing multiple roles, including a reprisal of their stage musical roles of Cara and Mel. In addition to their musical career, W continued to appear on Hello! Project's weekly TV show Hello! Morning, often in tandem with Morning Musume.

=== 2006-2007: Hiatus and disbandment ===
On January 11, 2006, the release of a new single, "Dō ni mo Tomaranai" on February 22, followed by their third full-length album, W3: Faithful on March 15, was announced. However, they were pushed back after photographs of Kago smoking underage were published in Friday in February 2006. Hello! Project issued a press statement saying that Kago and W's activities had been suspended indefinitely. Kago was ordered by her agency to stay at her family's residence in Nara for one year to self-reflect and was not allowed to contact Tsuji.

In January 2007, Kago returned to Tokyo and did assorted clerical work at her agency's office while the company was making preparations for her comeback. Not long after, photographs of Kago smoking underage for a third time, as well as going on a "dirty weekend trip" to an onsen with a 37-year-old man, began circulating in the media, completely tarnishing her reputation. Kago was dismissed from the company, and W disbanded as a result.

=== Post-W activities ===
Kago posted on her blog in 2014 that she and Tsuji were in contact again. In 2018, Tsuji and Kago were invited as guests at Hello! Project's 20th anniversary summer concert, leading to both their names trending on Twitter; they were scheduled to perform together, but Tsuji dropped out from maternity leave. In 2019, they were announced as performing guests at Hello! Project's spring concert and were releasing their previously cancelled works, "Do ni mo Tomaranai" and W3: Faithful, on March 30 as digital releases; "Do ni mo Tomaranai" would be bundled as a double A-side single with "Choi Waru Devil." At Hello! Project's spring concert, the two performed together in front of a crowd of 5,000 people for the first time in 13 years.

== Discography ==
=== Albums ===
==== Studio albums ====
List of albums, with selected chart positions, sales figures and certifications
Title	Year	Album details	Peak chart positions		Sales	Certifications
Title	Year	Album details	JPN Oricon	JPN Hot (Note: The Billboard Japan Hot Albums did not exist until June 4, 2015.)	Sales	Certifications
Duo U&U	2004	Released: June 2, 2004; Label: Zetima; Formats: CD	4	—N/a	JPN: 85,017	—N/a
2nd W	2005	Released: March 2, 2005; Label: Zetima; Formats: CD	11	—N/a	JPN: 27,534	—N/a
Choi Waru Devil	2019	Released: March 30, 2019; Label: Zetima; Formats: Digital download	4	21	TBA	—N/a
"—" denotes releases that did not chart or were not released in that region.

==== Video albums ====
Title	Details	Peak chart positions	Sales
Title	Details	JPN	Sales
W no Satsuei no Sekai vol. 1	Released: October 14, 2004; Label: Zetima; Formats: DVD	—	—
"—" denotes releases that did not chart or were not released in that region.

=== Singles ===
Title	Year	Peak position	Sales
Title	Year	JPN	Sales
"Koi no Vacance"	2004	10	39,226
"Aa Ii na!"	2004	7	41,581
"Robo Kiss"	2004	5	30,239
"Koi no Fuga"	2005	12	20,922
"Ai no Imi o Oshiete!"	2005	11	21,408
"Miss Love Tantei"	2005	13	39,226
"Dō ni mo Tomaranai" / "Choi Waru Devil" (どうにもとまらない/ちょい悪デビル)	2019	—	—
"—" denotes releases that did not chart or were not released in that region.

== Filmography ==
=== Television ===
Year	Title	Role	Network	Notes
2004–2005	Hello! Morning	Themselves	TV Tokyo	Morning Musume's variety show
2004–2005	Oha Suta	Themselves; Cara and Mel	TV Tokyo	Appeared as Cara and Mel from January 11-September 8, 2005

=== Theatre ===
Year	Title	Role	Notes
2005	Mysterious Girl Detectives Cara & Mel: The Case of the Stolen Dangerous Violin (ふしぎ少女探偵 キャラ&メル 魔のヴァイオリン盗難事件)	Cara and Mel	

== Tours ==
=== Headlining ===
- 2004 Summer First Concert Tour ~ W Standby! W & Berryz Kobo (2004)
- 2005 Summer W & Berryz Kobo Concert Tour: High Score! (2005)

=== Concert participation ===
- Morning Musume Concert Tour 2004 Spring: The Best of Japan (2004)
- Hello! Project 2004 Summer: Natsu no Dōn! (2004)
- Hello! Project 2005 Winter: All Stars Dai Ranbu: A Happy New Power! Kei Yasuda Graduation Special (2005)
- Hello! Pro Party! 2005: Aya Matsuura Captain Kōen (2005)
- Hello! Project 20th Anniversary!! Hello! Project Hina Fes 2019 (2019)

== Publications ==
- 20 January 2005 – 50W
- U+U=W Essaybook
