= Ayaka Nagate =

- 長手 絢香
- Born: Ayaka Kimura (木村 絢香); October 30, 1981 (age 44); Kobe, Hyogo, Japan
- Other names: Ayaka; Coconuts Musume Ayaka
- Occupation: Actress
- Spouse: Hideto Tanihara (m. 2008)
- Children: 2
- Musical career
- Genres: J-pop
- Years active: 1999–2008
- Label: Zetima
- Formerly of: Coconuts Musume; Petitmoni; Romans; Kiiro 5; 7-nin Matsuri; Sexy 8; 11Water; H.P. All Stars

Ayaka Tanihara (谷原 絢香, Tanihara Ayaka), born Ayaka Kimura (木村 絢香, Kimura Ayaka) October 30, 1981 and known professionally as Ayaka Nagate (長手 絢香, Nagate Ayaka), is a Japanese actress and former singer. From 1998 to 2008, Nagate was part of Hello! Project as a member of the Japan-based girl group Coconuts Musume.

== History ==
Nagate joined Hello! Project in 1999 after being discovered by Makoto, fellow Sharan Q bandmate of Tsunku, with four other girls, forming Coconuts Musume. Having lived most of her teenage years in Hawaiʻi and attending English schools in Japan, Nagate is fluent in both Japanese and English. She is best known by foreign fans for her "Ayaka no Totsugeki Eikaiwa" (Ayaka's Surprise English Lessons) TV segment, where she would test the English skills of Morning Musume members.

On April 30, 2008, Nagate left from Coconuts Musume and Hello! Project to pursue acting. The following day, it was revealed that she had signed with Tristone Entertainment, going under the stage name of Ayaka Nagate.

== Personal life ==
On July 14, 2008, it was announced that she and professional golfer Hideto Tanihara had married.

== Photobooks ==
- September 5, 2003 – Ayaka – Ayaka Shashinshū (Ayaka – アヤカ写真集)
