= Coconuts Musume =

Japanese idol girl group

- Coconuts Musume in concert, 2002. From left to right: Mika Todd, Ayaka Kimura, Lehua Sandbo.

Background information
- Also known as: Coconuts Musume Ayaka; M-CO² (Taiwan)
- Origin: Hawaii, U.S.
- Genre: J-pop
- Years active: 1999–2008
- Labels: Sony Music Entertainment Japan; Zetima
- Spinoffs: Minimoni
- Spinoff of: Hello! Project
- Past members: Ayaka Nagate; Mika Todd; Lehua Sandbo; Danielle DeLaunay; April Barbaran; Chelsea Ching
- Website: www.helloproject.com

Coconuts Musume (ココナッツ娘。, Kokonattsu Musume.) was a Japanese idol girl group formed by Up-Front Promotion in 1999 and associated with Hello! Project. They were promoted as the "girls from Hawaii" and initially active in Taiwan as M-CO². After several lineup changes, the group broke up in 2008, when final remaining member Ayaka Nagate (then Ayaka Kimura) graduated from Hello! Project.

== History ==
=== 1998–2000: Formation and early singles ===
In November 1998, the Pacific Dream Pop Singer Contest audition was held in Hawaii, drawing approximately 1,500 applicants. Sharam Q drummer Makoto selected five finalists in March 1999 (Chelsea Ching, April Barbaran, Danielle DeLaunay, Mika Todd, and Ayaka Kimura) to form Coconuts Musume under the production of Sharam Q vocalist Tsunku. The group was introduced on the Japanese television program Asayan performing an English cover of Morning Musume's "Summer Night Town".

Signed to SME Records, the quintet released its debut double A-side single, "Halation Summer / Summer Night Town (English Version)", on July 23, 1999, with "Halation Summer" serving as the first opening theme for the TV Tokyo anime Kyoro-chan. A second single, "Dance & Chance", followed on August 25, 1999. That summer, the group also toured Taiwan under the name M-CO². At formation, only Kimura and Todd spoke fluent Japanese, while the remaining three members struggled to adjust to idol life in Japan; Ching and Barbaran left the group in January 2000 to focus on their education and pursue modeling.

=== 2000–2004: Lineup changes ===
In November 1999, Sony Music Entertainment Japan held auditions in Honolulu for a sixth member, selecting Lehua Sandbo, who joined the group in January 2000. Around May 2000, the group's Japanese name was slightly changed from ココナッツ娘 to ココナッツ娘。 (adding a trailing maru punctuation mark), coinciding with their third single, "Tokonatsu Musume" (May 17, 2000). Their fourth single, "Watashi mo 'I Love You'" (July 26, 2000), was used in commercials for House Foods' O'Zack snacks.

DeLaunay graduated in May 2001 in to concentrate her education, leaving the group as a trio. Coconuts Musume then moved from SME Records to Up-Front's Zetima label, releasing their fifth and final single, "Jōnetsu Yuki Miraisen", on August 22, 2001. After Sandbo graduated in February 2002 to continue her studies, the duo of Kimura and Todd released no further standalone singles under the Coconuts Musume name, but continued performing at Hello! Project concerts, appeared in musicals such as Love Century, and participated in compilation albums and promotional campaigns for Dole pineapples.

Alongside group activities, members joined several Hello! Project sub-units and annual shuffle units. In January 2001, Todd became the fourth member of Minimoni, later succeeding Mari Yaguchi as the sub-unit's second leader in March 2003. In July 2002, Kimura joined the third-generation lineup of Petitmoni, and in 2003 participated in the unit Romans. On May 2, 2004, at the final date of Morning Musume's spring concert tour at Saitama Super Arena, Todd graduated from Coconuts Musume, Minimoni, and Hello! Project to study music in California.

=== 2004–2008: Solo era and disbandment ===
After Todd's departure, Kimura remained the sole member of Coconuts Musume. Producer Tsunku announced that she would continue career solo under the pseudonym "Ayaka (Coconuts Musume)". During this period, she regularly performed in Hello! Project concerts, hosted radio and television English-lesson segments, and released photobooks and educational books.

On April 30, 2008, Hello! Project announced that Kimura was graduating from the collective and ending her contract with Up-Front Agency to pursue an acting career, disbanding Coconuts Musume after nine years. In August 2023, Up-Front released the music video for "Jōnetsu Yuki Miraisen" on YouTube as part of Hello! Project's 25th-anniversary archive series.

=== After disbandment ===
On May 1, 2008, Kimura signed with Tristone Entertainment under the stage name Ayaka Nagate; in July 2008, she married Japanese professional golfer Hideto Tanihara, with whom she later had two children, while making periodic film and television appearances. Sandbo won Miss Congeniality at Miss Hawaii USA in 2003 and was crowned Mrs. Hawaii-United States in 2008.

== Members ==
Name	Background	Years active	Notes
Ayaka Kimura / Ayaka Nagate (アヤカ / 木村絢香)	Kobe, Hyōgo Prefecture, Japan	1999–2008	Original member; leader (2000–2008); member of Petitmoni and Romans
Mika Todd (ミカ・トッド)	Oahu, Hawaii, U.S.	1999–2004	Original member; member and 2nd leader of Minimoni; graduated May 2, 2004
Danielle DeLaunay (ダニエル・デラウニー)	Maui, Hawaii, U.S.	1999–2001	Original member; graduated May 2001
Chelsea Ching (チェルシー・チン)	Oahu, Hawaii, U.S.	1999–2000	Original member; first leader (1999–2000); left January 2000
April Barbaran (エイプリル・ババラン)	Hawaii, U.S.	1999–2000	Original member; left January 2000
Lehua Sandbo (レフア・サンボ)	Haleiwa, Hawaii, U.S.	2000–2002	Added January 2000 via Honolulu auditions; graduated February 2002

== Discography ==
=== Singles ===
#	Title	Release date	Label	Oricon peak	First week sales	Total sales	Notes / B-side
1	"Halation Summer / Summer Night Town (English Version)" (ハレーションサマー／サマーナイトタウン (English Version))	1999-07-23	SME Records	40	6,840	9,730	First opening theme for Kyoro-chan
2	"Dance & Chance"	1999-08-25	SME Records	86	2,740	—	B-side: "Zurui Onna"
3	"Tokonatsu Musume" (常夏娘)	2000-05-17	SME Records	64	2,820	—	First single billed as ココナッツ娘。
4	"Watashi mo 'I Love You'" (私も「I LOVE YOU」)	2000-07-26	SME Records	82	2,540	—	House Foods "O'Zack" commercial song
5	"Jōnetsu Yuki Miraisen" (情熱行き 未来船)	2001-08-22	Zetima	69	3,420	—	B-side: "Koibito Boogie Woogie!"

=== Compilation and promotional appearances ===
Year	Release	Track(s)	Notes
2000	Petit Best ~Ki Ao Aka~	"Summer Night Town (English Version)" "Dance & Chance (English Version)"	Also contributed to shuffle units on the album
2001	Petit Best 2 ~San 7 10~	"Jōnetsu Yuki Miraisen"	Track 10
2001	Shinsaku Dōyō Pops 1	"Pineapple Paradise" "Yoru"	With Aya Matsuura, Mai Satoda, Maki Goto, Atsuko Inaba, and Country Musume
2002	Dōyō Pops 2: Haru no Uta-shū	Children's song covers	With Hello! Project artists
2002	Hawaiian de Kiku Morning Musume Single Collection	8 Hawaiian-arranged Morning Musume covers	As Takagi Boo & Morning Musume, Coconuts Musume, Miki Fujimoto, Rika Ishii
2002	Dōyō Pops 3: Natsu no Uta-shū	"Umi"	With Masae Ohtani, Rika Ishii, and Miki Fujimoto
2002	Dōyō Pops 4: Aki no Uta-shū	"Muramatsuri"	With Asami Konno and Michiyo Heike
2002	Petit Best 3	"Mr. Moonlight ~Ai no Big Band~ (Hawaiian Version)"	Track 15
2002	Pineapple Paradise (Promotional CD)	"Pineapple Paradise"	Not-for-sale Dole Sweetio campaign disc with Aya Matsuura and Mai Satoda
2007	Tsunku♂ Best Sakuhin-shū (Jō) "Sharan Q ~ Morning Musume."	"Dance & Chance"	Disc track 9

=== Videos and DVDs ===
#	Title	Release date	Notes
1	1st Video "Coconuts Musume" (1stビデオ『ココナッツ娘』)	1999-10-21	VHS release
2	Petit Best DVD ~Ki Ao Aka~	2004-12-15	Includes "Summer Night Town (English Version)" and "Dance & Chance"
3	Petit Best 2 DVD ~San 7 10~	2004-12-15	Includes "Jōnetsu Yuki Miraisen"
4	Petit Best 3 DVD	2004-12-15	Includes "Morning Musume Single Medley ~Hawaiian~"

== Appearances ==
=== Television ===
- Bishōjo Kyōiku (2001, TXN – Ayaka Kimura regular on "Ayaka's Surprise English Lesson")
- Bishōjo Kyōiku II (2002, TXN – Ayaka Kimura regular on "Ayaka's Surprise English Lesson")
- Idol wo Sagase!
- Hello! Morning

=== Musicals ===
- Love Century -Yume wa Minna Kerya Hajimaranai- (2001)
- Ken & Merī no Meken Kon On-stage (2003)
- Edokko. Chūshingura (2003)
- Sayonara no Love Song (2004)
- Fushigi Shōjo Tantei Kyara & Mel (2005)

=== Radio ===
- Kiss the Coconuts! (Mika and Ayaka)
- Blend Kiss (Ayaka with Country Musume)

== Publications ==
=== Books ===
- Mika no Iketeru Eikaiwa (April 1, 2002, Shogakukan, ISBN 978-4-09-253031-7)
- Coconuts Musume no Tanoshii Hawaii Ryūgaku (July 16, 2002, Up-Front Books / Wani Books, ISBN 978-4-8470-1460-4)
