= Mari Yaguchi =

Japanese singer, actress, and television personality

- 矢口真里
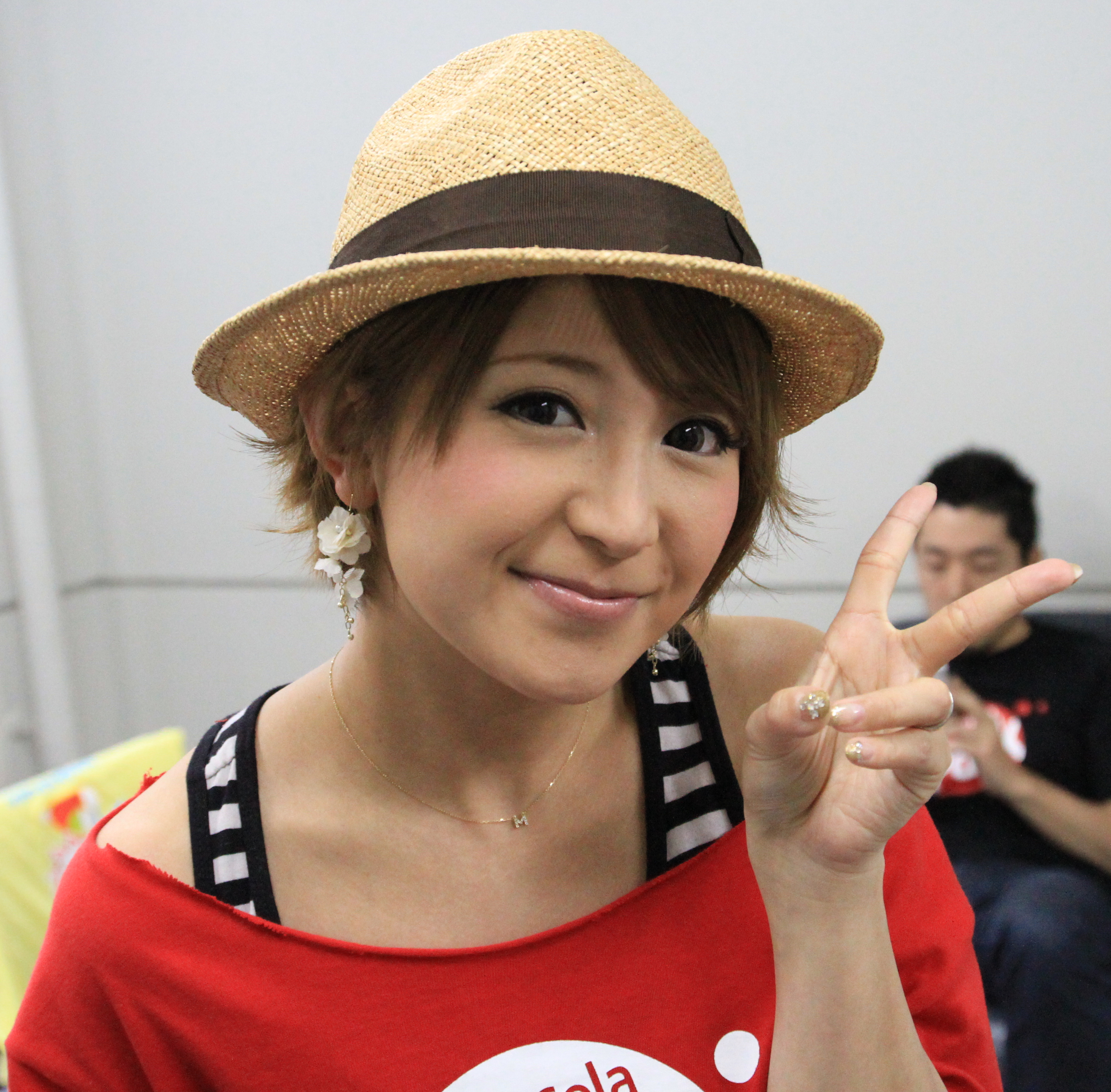
- Yaguchi in 2012
- Born: January 20, 1983 (age 43); Izumi-ku, Yokohama, Japan
- Occupations: Singer; actress; television personality
- Years active: 1998–2013, 2015–present
- Height: 1.45 m (4 ft 9 in)
- Spouses: Masaya Nakamura (m. 2011; div. 2013) Kenzo Umeda (m. 2018)
- Children: 2
- Musical career
- Genre: J-pop
- Labels: Zetima; hachama
- Member of: Dream Morning Musume
- Formerly of: Morning Musume (1998–2005); ZYX; Romans; Tanpopo; Mini-Moni; Morning Musume Sakuragumi; Hello! Project Shuffle Unit

Mari Yaguchi (矢口真里, Yaguchi Mari; born January 20, 1983) is a Japanese singer, actress, and television personality. She joined the girl group Morning Musume in 1998 as a second generation member and was the leader of subgroups within Hello! Project, such as Mini-Moni, Morning Musume Sakuragumi, and ZYX. After leaving Morning Musume in 2005, Yaguchi has continued to appear on television in dramas and variety shows.

== Career ==
=== 1998-2005: Morning Musume ===
Yaguchi became a member of Japanese idol girl group Morning Musume during the second generation auditions in 1998. In 1998, she also became a member of Tanpopo, one of Morning Musume's sub-groups. During her time with Morning Musume, her solo line "Sexy Beam" from their 2000 single "Koi no Dance Site" became a media phenomenon and became closely associated with her.

In late 2000, Yaguchi founded Mini-Moni, a sub-group of Morning Musume and Coconuts Musume featuring members who are 150 cms. and shorter, as their leader. She left the group in 2002 after the release of Mini-Moni the Movie: Okashi na Daibōken!, which explained a fictional account behind her reasons for leaving. In 2003, she participated in the girl groups ZYX, Romans, and Morning Musume Sakuragumi.

Yaguchi abruptly resigned from Morning Musume in April 2005 after her relationship with Shun Oguri went public in the media, stating that the incident affected her ability to uphold the group's idol image, as the members were not allowed to date.Afterwards, Yaguchi began to focus on acting and hosting variety shows.

=== 2005–2009: Solo career ===
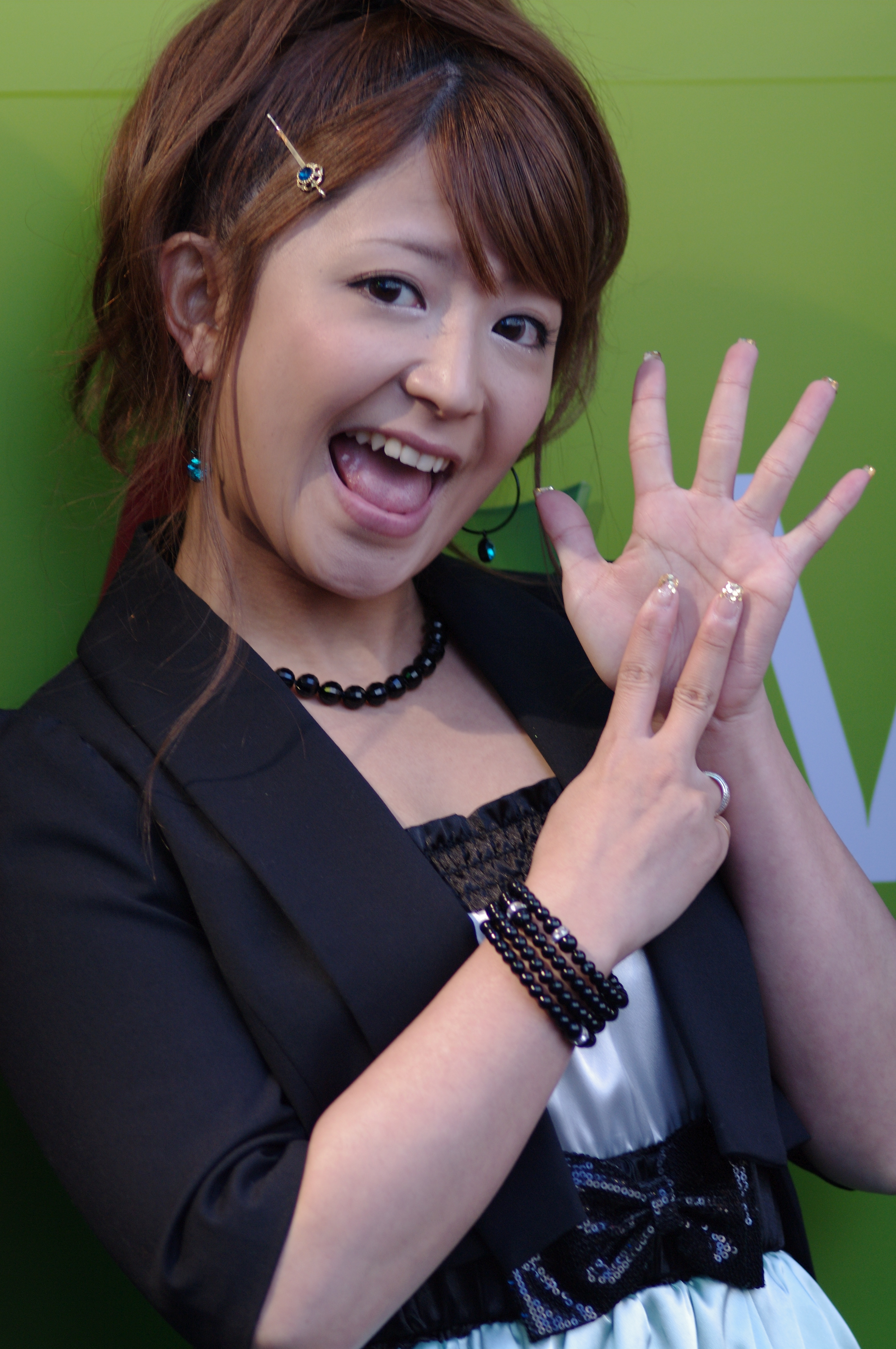
Yaguchi in 2009

Yaguchi's first solo recording, "Nigiyaka na Fuyu," a collaboration with Berryz Kobo, appears as the coupling track on Berryz Kobo's November 2005 single "Gag 100kaibun Aishite Kudasai" for Futari wa Pretty Cure Max Heart the Movie 2: Friends of the Snow-Laden Sky. She and Berryz Kobo member Saki Shimizu made cameos in the film.

Yaguchi starred in the Japanese drama series Sentō no Musume!? (銭湯の娘!?) along with fellow Hello! Project member Mai Hagiwara. Yaguchi was also one of the main actors in the Japanese daytime drama series Gal Circle (ギャルサー, Garusaa). She co-hosted her show Yaguchi Hitori, and did MCing for Hello! Project concerts. From May 25, 2007 to June 6, 2007, Yaguchi performed in the musical Damn Yankees at the Tokyo Aoyama Theater. In the summer of 2007, Yaguchi was recruited to host the Gyao internet TV show Midtown TV. Yaguchi and seven Hello! Pro Eggs appeared on the live-audience show Ciao TV.

Following the popularity of singles and an album released in conjunction with the Japanese variety program Quiz! Hexagon II (クイズ!ヘキサゴンII), Yaguchi released her debut solo single, "Seishun Boku/Seishun Ore" (青春 僕/青春 俺), on March 25, 2009.

=== 2009–present: Post-Hello! Project career ===
Yaguchi, together with the entire Hello! Project Elder Club, graduated from Hello! Project on March 31, 2009. A graduation concert was held at Yokohama Arena on February 1, 2009. In December, Yaguchi joined Dream Morning Musume alongside other former Morning Musume members.

In 2013, Yaguchi decided to retire from entertainment following backlash from her extramarital affair and divorce from actor Masaya Nakamura. She resumed making appearances on television in 2014.

In 2018, she co-hosted the Netflix dating show Rea(L)ove alongside Atsushi Tamura.

== Personal life ==
In 2004, while she was in Morning Musume, Yaguchi was in a romantic relationship with Shun Oguri, which violated her group's no-dating policy. After news surrounding their relationship was published in weekly tabloids, she withdrew from Morning Musume voluntarily after being asked to choose between the group or their relationship. The two later ended their relationship in 2006.

Yaguchi married actor Masaya Nakamura in May 2011. The two had planned to marry in March of that year, but postponed to May due to the Tōhoku earthquake and tsunami. Yaguchi legally changed her name to Nakamura, but stated that she would continue to use Yaguchi as her stage name.

On May 21, 2013, Josei Seven reported that Yaguchi and Nakamura had been living apart since late February after Nakamura discovered she was having an extramarital affair with model Kenzo Umeda through used bedsheets and Umeda hiding in the closet naked. Umeda had canceled his social internet accounts without explanation in early March, but he denied doing anything wrong following the Josei Seven report. In the following days there were more press reports about multiple instances of alleged infidelity by Yaguchi; however, Yaguchi alleged that Nakamura had been physically abusive towards her. On May 30, 2013, the public relations firm for Yaguchi and Nakamura announced that the couple had submitted their divorce papers. Following scandal, on October 13, 2013, Yaguchi announced that she would go on an indefinite hiatus; she resumed making television appearances in 2014. One of the commercials she filmed post-divorce involved her making self-deprecating jokes about her divorce, which was pulled off air after complaints.

On March 26, 2018, Yaguchi married Umeda. The couple has two sons.

== Discography ==
Title	Year	Peak position	Sales
Title	Year	JPN	Sales
"Seishun Boku" (青春 僕) / "Seishun Ore" (青春 俺) (double A-side single with Airband)	2009	6	33,126
"Kaze o Sagashite" (風をさがして) (as Mari Yaguchi with Straw Hat)	2010	2	37,000

== Publications ==
=== Photobooks ===
#	Title	Release date	ISBN
1	Yaguchi (ヤグチ)	February 7, 2002	ISBN 4-8470-2697-7
2	Love Hello! Yaguchi Mari Shashinshū (ラブハロ！矢口真里写真集)	July 2, 2003	ISBN 4-04-853657-5
3	Off	June 12, 2004	ISBN 4-8470-2810-4

=== Essay books ===
#	Title	Release date	ISBN
1	Oira - Mari Yaguchi First Essay (おいら―Mari Yaguchi First Essay)	October 10, 2003	ISBN 4-8470-1502-9
2	Chitchai Yaguchi Mari no Dekkai Anata ni Ai ni Iku no da!! (ちっちゃい矢口真里のでっかいあなたに会いに行くのだ!!)	June 25, 2007	ISBN 4-08-780470-4

== Filmography ==
- 1998 – Morning Cop (モーニング刑事)
- 2000 – Pinch Runner (ピンチランナー)
- 2002 – Nama Tamago (ナマタマゴ)
- 2002 – Minimoni ja Movie: Okashi na Daibōken! (ミニモニ。じゃ ムービー お菓子な大冒険!)
- 2003 – Koinu Dan no Monogatari (子犬ダンの物語)
- 2006 – One Piece The Movie: Episode of Alabasta: The Desert Princess and the Pirates (One Piece エピソードオブアラバスタ 砂漠の王女と海賊たち; Voice acting role)
- 2008 – Kung Fu-kun (カンフーくん)
- 2008 – Journey to the Center of the Earth (Japanese release, voice)
- 2010 – Hoshizuna No Shima No Chiisana Tenshi: Mermaid's Smile (星砂の島のちいさな天使～マーメイドスマイル～)
- 2003 – Kochira Hon Ikegami Sho (こちら本池上署)
- 2006 – Sentō no Musume!? (銭湯の娘!?)
- 2006 – Gal Circle (ギャルサー)
- 2009 – One Piece (ワンピース; Voice acting role)
- 2011 – Digimon Xros Wars (デジモンクロスウォーズ; Character Design + Voice acting role)
- 2004 – 2009: Yaguchi Hitori Maru C (やぐちひとり(C))
- 2006 – 2007: Kanrui! Jikū Times (感涙！時空タイムス)
- 2007 – 2008: Midtown TV
- 2009 – 2011: How to Monkey Baby! (How to モンキーベイビー！)
- April 2011 – October 2011: Yaguchi Hitori SHOW (やぐちひとりSHOW)
- Yaguchi Mari Kayo The Night
