= Ai Kago =

Japanese singer (born 1988)

- 加護 亜依
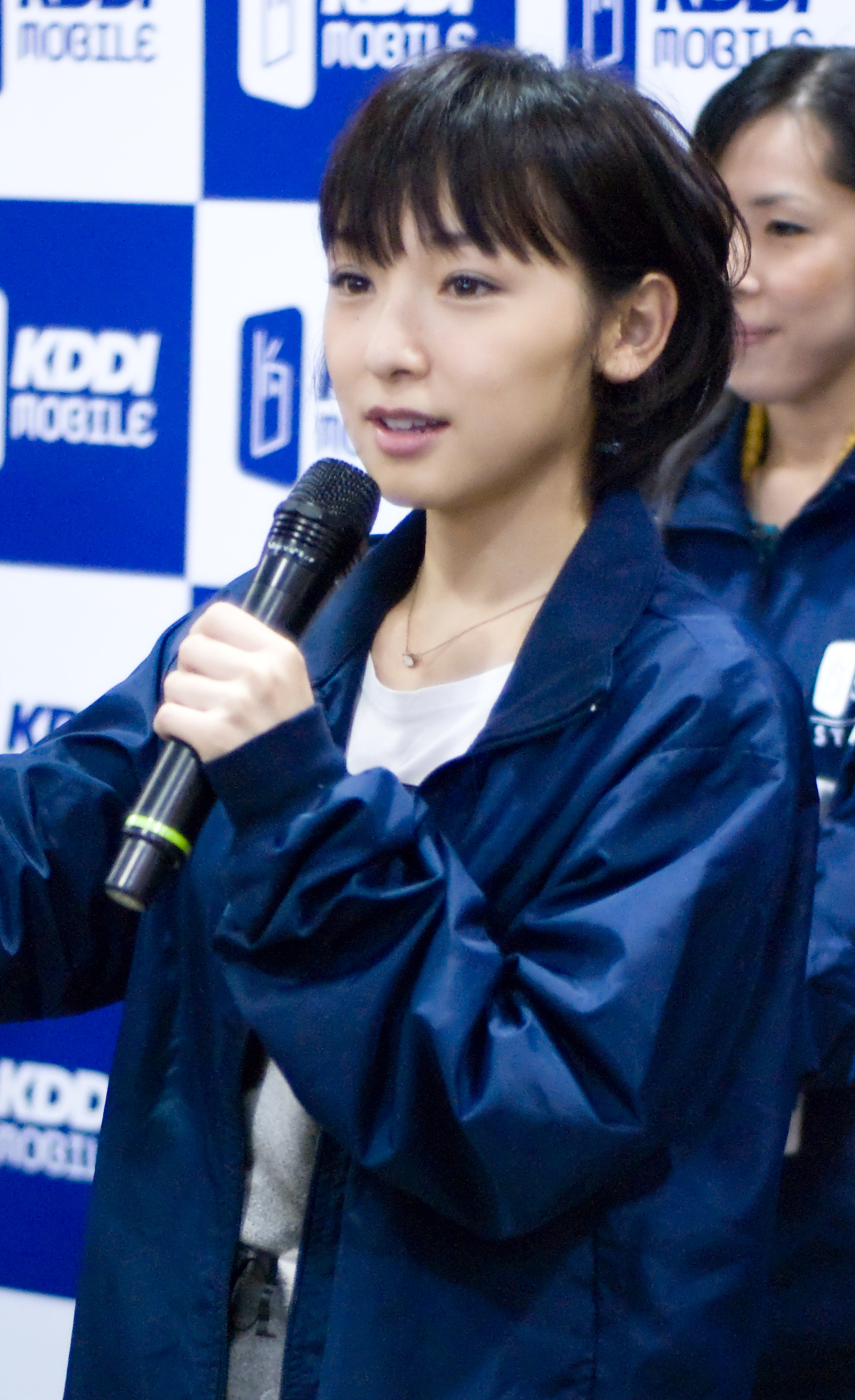
- Ai Kago in November 2009
- Born: February 7, 1988 (age 38); Yamatotakada, Nara, Japan
- Occupations: Singer; actress
- Height: 155 cm (5 ft 1 in)
- Spouse: Haruhiko Ando (m. 2011; div. 2015)
- Children: 2
- Musical career
- Genre: J-pop
- Years active: 2000–2007; 2008–present
- Labels: Zetima (2000–2007); in da groove/Columbia Japan (2008–2010); P-Vine Records (2010–present)
- Formerly of: Girls Beat!!; W; Morning Musume; Tanpopo; Sakuragumi; 3-nin Matsuri; Happy 7; Salt5; Mini-Moni; Hello! Project
- Website: http://ameblo.jp

Ai Kago (加護 亜依, Kago Ai; born February 7, 1988) is a Japanese actress and singer. In 2000, Kago debuted as a 4th-generation member of the idol girl group Morning Musume. During her time in Morning Musume, she was also part of its sub-groups Tanpopo, Mini-Moni, and Morning Musume Sakuragumi, as well as several Hello! Project Shuffle Units. In 2004, Kago departed from Morning Musume and became part of the duo W with Nozomi Tsuji.

In 2006, Kago was suspended from her agency for underage smoking and subsequently dismissed in 2007, forcing her to leave W and Hello! Project. In 2008, she returned to entertainment as an actress, appearing in Kung Fu Chefs (2009), Ju-On: Black Ghost (2009), and Battle of Demons (2009). In 2009, Kago returned to music as well, releasing her debut solo single, "No Hesitation" (2009), followed by her jazz album, Ai Kago Meets Jazz (2010). She also formed her own girl group, Girls Beat!!, in 2013, of which she remained a member until 2016.

== Career ==
=== 2000–2004: Morning Musume and Mini-Moni ===
At age 12, Kago won the 4th National Audition of Morning Musume held by the Up-Front Works in 2000. On April 15, she, along with Rika Ishikawa, Hitomi Yoshizawa, and Nozomi Tsuji, were inducted into the idol group Morning Musume as its fourth generation. Their recording debut was in the group's ninth single "Happy Summer Wedding".

Kago and Tsuji's addition to the group received positive critical response. With an increasing fan base, they, along with Morning Musume member Mari Yaguchi and Coconuts Musume member Mika Todd, formed a new subgroup named Mini-Moni. In addition to this, Kago was also admitted into established subgroup Tanpopo as a second generation member. From 2001 to 2004 Kago participated in the annual Hello! Project shuffle units (3-nin Matsuri in 2001, Happy 7 in 2002, Salt5 in 2003, and H.P. All Stars in 2004).

=== 2004–2007: W ===
In August 2004, Kago and Tsuji graduated from Morning Musume together after Mini-Moni began their indefinite hiatus. Under the arrangement of their agency, Kago and Tsuji formed a new pop duo, W, releasing two albums and six singles together.

Before the release of their seventh single and their third album, W3: Faithful, on February 9, 2006, Friday published photos showing Kago smoking. She was 15 at the time the photos were taken. The following day, her agency issued a press statement saying that she and W's activities had been suspended "indefinitely." Under orders from her agency, Kago spent the remainder of the year at her family's residence in Nara, with privileges revoked to "self-reflect". During this time, she was not allowed to have contact with Tsuji or any other girls from her agency. She was caught smoking again during her probation period.

In early 2007, Up-Front Works reported that they were working on her comeback. On 23 January 2007, Kago had moved to Tokyo and started helping at the agency's office. On 26 March 2007, photos of Kago going to an onsen with a man 18 years her senior and smoking for a third time were published in a weekly magazine, further tarnishing her reputation. On the same day, Yūkichi Kawaguchi, the director of Up-Front Works, issued a statement announcing that she had been dismissed from the agency.

=== 2008–2010: Return to entertainment ===
After Kago departed from Up-Front Agency, her mother attempted to sign her to a new talent agency in her hometown, Nara. Later that year, Josei Seven published an interview with her mother, revealing that Kago left Japan and started residing in New York City. Kago herself later revealed that she had actually not gone to New York, but rather to Los Angeles for three months because she felt like a criminal in Japan. During her stay, she met people who encouraged her, including Winona Ryder, and was able to reflect on her situation. She also considered suicide and cut her wrists.

Kago made a well-publicized return to the entertainment industry in 2008 with plans of pursuing an acting career. She began appearing in multiple Hong Kong movies, including Kung Fu Chefs. On August 25, 2008, Kago released a book entitled Kago Ai Live—Miseinen Hakusho (ＬＩＶＥ—未成年白書). On her blog, she described the book as "a book where I talk to young teens about their various troubles and dreams."

During 2009, Kago also focused on rebuilding her music career. On June 24, 2009, she released her first solo single "No HesitAtIon" [sic] on independent record label In Da Groove. On February 16, 2010, she held her first jazz concert at bar JZ Brat in Tokyo. Kago's first jazz album, Ai Kago meets Jazz: The First Door, was released on March 31, 2010 through P-Vine Records and Avex Marketing. In August 2010 she was invited to perform at music festival Summer Sonic.

=== 2011–present: Personal struggles and Girls Beat!! ===
Throughout the second half of 2010, Kago became unhappy with the direction of her work. Around the same time, she began dating restaurant owner Haruhiko Ando, who acted as a go-between for her agency and herself. Since beginning a relationship with Ando, Kago cancelled several jobs at the last minute, causing her agency to suspend her activities. Despite this, she participated in a live performance and opened a separate blog without permission.

Kago parted ways with R&A Promotions in November 2010 despite her contract ending in March 2013. As a response, in 2011, Kazuyuki Ito, president of Mainstream (an associate of R&A Promotions), declared that the agency planned on suing for ¥100 million in damages for contract violations. During that time, Kago's career was also derailed by her personal life.

After spending 2012 out of the public eye with the birth of her daughter, Minami, Kago transferred to a new agency in 2013. Planning to revive her music career, she formed an idol group, which was later named Girls Beat!! The group would be crowd-sourced using lyrics, music, and costume ideas submitted by fans. Remi Kita and Ryona Himeno were recruited as the other two members after passing the auditions.

Girls Beat!! released their first single, "Sekai Seifuku" on July 22, 2014. Their activities were abruptly put on hold when an arrest warrant was put out for Ando in October on suspicions of loaning money at illegal interest rates. Kago later filed for divorce, planning to continue activities once the divorce was finalized. Although Kago was eventually successful in doing so, in August 2015, her contract with her agency expired, though she continued activities with Girls Beat!! in November. On February 29, 2016, she graduated from the group.

== Personal life ==
=== Public image ===
During Kago's years in Mini-Moni, she was known for keeping her hair in curled twin tails. Manga artist Arina Tanemura used her hairstyle as inspiration for Mitsuki Koyama, the main character of Full Moon o Sagashite. Her official nickname in Hello! Project was "Aibon."

Kago and Tsuji shared the world record for the largest hula hoop spun at 4.08 m (13 ft 5 in) in diameter. They set their record on January 1, 2004, during a live New Year's Day television special at Nippon Television Network, Tokyo, Japan. The record appeared in the 2005 and 2006 editions of the Guinness Book of World Records before it was broken by Ashrita Furman in September 2005.

=== Relationships and family ===
During Kago's house arrest in 2006, her parents divorced. In 2009, Kago was involved in a relationship with actor Hidejiro Mizumoto. Mizumoto's wife, Asato, sued them both, stating that she had proof of the affair and that it was the cause for her pending divorce. On May 24, 2009, a family court found in Asato's favor and ordered Mizumoto to hand over his home in Kumamoto and his car to Asato as well as ¥300,000 in child support every month for his three children. Shukan Josei reported in 2010 that Kago was romantically linked to model Takeshi Mikawai. Her agency released a statement claiming that while they dated, they were not a couple.

Kago began dating Haruhiko Ando, a restaurant owner in Roppongi, in August 2010, who acted as an in-between between her agency and herself. In September 2011, Ando was arrested for alleged extortion and claiming to have connections with the yakuza. Kago had been taken in for questioning. In the same month, Kago was rushed to a nearby hospital after agency officials found her on the floor of her apartment with cuts to her wrists. Her life was reported to be not in danger, though there were speculations that it was a planned suicide. Following the incident, she and Ando registered their marriage, and Kago became pregnant. and he took on her family name, Kago. From their marriage, Kago gave birth to her first child, Minami, on June 22, 2012.

The police issued an arrest warrant for Ando in October 2014 on suspicion of loaning money at illegal interest rates. This affected both Kago's career and image. In 2015, Kago announced through her official blog that they were living separately and were in the process of working towards a divorce. She attempted to file for divorce in April, but dropped charges due to insufficient funds. On June 9, Ando was arrested on domestic violence charges stemming from an incident on May 12 where he allegedly shoved and kicked Kago in their home in Roppongi, leaving her with injuries that took ten days to heal. Kago agreed to drop all charges in exchange for divorce, which was finalized later that month.

On August 8, 2016, Kago announced that she had married a 38-year-old beautician whose name was not disclosed to the public. On September 23, 2016, she announced that she was pregnant with her second child. On February 23, 2017, she announced on her blog that she gave birth her second child, a boy named Yoshitsugu. On December 30, 2024, she announced on her Instagram that she had divorced from her husband in 2022, and she had custody of her two children.

== Discography ==
Singles

Release date	Title	Oricon Singles Charts					Album
Release date	Title	Peak Positions			Sales		Album
Release date	Title	Daily	Weekly	Yearly	Debut	Overall	Album
June 24, 2009	"no hesitAtIon"	26	52	—	1757	—	—

Albums

- AI KAGO meets JAZZ (March 31, 2010 P-Vine)

Compilations

- Kirakira Majocco Cluv (キラキラ 魔女ッ娘 Cluv) (Various Artists, February 10, 2010 P-Vine)
  - Lum no Love Song (Urusei Yatsura OP) / Ai Kago × Brian Hardgroove (Public Enemy)
  - Himitsu no Akko-chan (Himitsu no Akko-chan OP) / Ai Kago × Paolo Scotti

== Filmography ==
=== Film ===
Year	Title	Role	Notes
2000	Pinch Runner	Cameo appearance	
2002	Mini Moni ja Movie: Okashi na Daibōken!	Herself	
2009	Kung Fu Chefs	Shum Ying	
2009	Benten-dori no Hitobito	Saku	
2009	Ju-on: Black Ghost	Yūko	
2009	Battle of Demons	Momoko Tosazuka	
2010	Nikushokukei Joshi (肉食系女子)	Kariko Oogami	
2010	The Haunting Lover		

=== Television ===
Year	Title	Role	Notes
2001	Mini-Moni Yaru no da Pyon!	Aibon	Voice in anime
2002	Angel Hearts		
2002	Kochira Hon Ikegami Sho (こちら本池上署)	Yumi Shiina	
2003	Kochira Hon Ikegami Sho 2 (こちら本池上署)	Yumi Shiina	
2003	Mini-Moni the TV	Aibon	Voice in anime
2004	Kochira Hon Ikegami Sho 3 (こちら本池上署)	Yumi Shiina	
2004	Kochira Hon Ikegami Sho 4 (こちら本池上署)	Yumi Shiina	
2004	Mini Moni's Town Musicians of Bremen (ミニモニ。でブレーメンの音楽隊)	Hinako Niwa	
2005	Kochira Hon Ikegami Sho 5 (こちら本池上署)	Yumi Shiina	
2008	Tonsure (トンスラ)	Mai Kurume	ep3,6,11–12
2008	Nihonshi Suspence Gekijō (日本史サスペンス劇場)	Princess Sen	
2009	Ikemen Shin Sobaya Tantei (イケ麺新そば屋探偵)	Masuyo Urami	ep3

== Publications ==
=== Books ===
Title	Release date	Publisher ISBN	Notes
Kago Ai Live—Miseinen Hakusho (ＬＩＶＥ—未成年白書)	August 25, 2008	Media Kreis; ISBN 978-4-7788-0338-4	

=== Photobooks ===
Title	Release date	Publisher ISBN	Notes
Kago Ai Shashinshū	November 11, 2003	Wani Books; ISBN 978-4-8470-2783-3	
Gekkan Kago Ai	January 23, 2009	Shinchousha; ISBN 978-4-10-790195-8	
Gekkan Kago Ai -Super Remix	March 19, 2009	Shinchosha; ISBN 978-4-10-790197-2	
Kago Ai Kinyōbi (金曜日 加護亜依写真集)	August 22, 2009	Kodansha; ISBN 978-4-06-352815-2	
Kago Ai Shashinshū LOS ANGELES (加護亜依写真集 『LOS ANGELES』)	March 25, 2010	Air Control; ISBN 978-4-86084-737-1	

=== DVDs ===
Title	Release date	Publisher	Notes
Kago Channel (DVD) (Vol.1)	November 28, 2008	avex trax	
Kago Channel (DVD) (Vol.2)	December 19, 2008	avex trax	
Gekkan Kago Ai – marionnette	February 20, 2009	E-net Frontier	
Micchaku Kago Ai	February 20, 2009	E-net Frontier	Originally released exclusively to Lawson convenience stores, Nationwide release July 30, 2009
Kago Ai VS. FRIDAY (DVD) (加護亜依 VS. FRIDAY)	October 25, 2009	GP Museum Soft	
LOS ANGELES	March 25, 2010	Air Control	
