= Nozomi Tsuji =

Japanese singer and actress (born 1987)

Nozomi Tsuji 辻 希美
- Also known as: Nozomi Sugiura (杉浦 希美)
- Born: Nozomi Tsuji; June 17, 1987 (age 39); Tokyo, Japan
- Occupations: Singer; Actress; Dancer
- Years active: 2000–present
- Spouse: Taiyo Sugiura (m. 2007)
- Musical career
- Genres: J-pop
- Label: Zetima
- Formerly of: W; Morning Musume; Mini Moni; Morning Musume Otomegumi; 10-nin Matsuri; Odoru 11; 11Water; Hello! Project; Gyaruru (ギャルル)

Nozomi Sugiura (杉浦 希美, Sugiura Nozomi), known professionally by her birth name Nozomi Tsuji (辻 希美, Tsuji Nozomi) (born June 17, 1987) is a Japanese media personality, singer, and blogger. In 2000, she began her career as a singer for Japanese girl band Morning Musume. Tsuji later found success with related groups Mini Moni and W. She has participated in the shuffle groups 10-nin Matsuri, Odoru 11, and 11Water, H.P. All Stars, as well as being a member of the Morning Musume splinter group Morning Musume Otomegumi

== Early life ==
Tsuji was born in Tokyo, Japan. She is the second and youngest child of two daughters.

== Career ==
=== 2000–2004: Morning Musume and Mini Moni ===
In 2000, when Tsuji was twelve years old, she auditioned for the pop group Morning Musume. Group producer Tsunku originally planned on selecting only three members; Rika Ishikawa, Hitomi Yoshizawa, and Ai Kago were chosen. He made the decision to add Tsuji as a fourth member, creating Morning Musume's fourth generation. "Happy Summer Wedding" was released on May 17, 2000, marking Tsuji's debut just one month before turning age thirteen. In January 2001, she formed Mini Moni with Mari Yaguchi and Ai Kago.

As the youngest two members of the group, she and Kago assumed the roles of the hyperactive troublemakers of Morning Musume. The two were featured in a May 2002 duo compilation photobook, Tsuji Kago. Fans took to them quickly, dubbing them "The Twins", based on their similar looks and personalities. They both retained these personalities for their initial years with Morning Musume, but by 2003, younger members had joined the group; Kago and Tsuji resorted to maintaining their strong friendship. They were also known as "Two Top" on the television comedy show Mecha-Mecha Iketeru!: during a special "final exam" episode featuring Morning Musume, the two were both the least knowledgeable when given surprise pop quizzes on several grade school problems, Tsuji being the least knowledgeable and Kago being second, resulting in Tsuji being crowned Bakajo, which means "idiot girl".

From January 2003 to June 2003, she was a temporary world record holder in the Guinness World Records for spinning the largest Hula Hoop (12.5 m). She regained the title in January 2004 and simultaneously held it with Kago until September 2005, when Ashrita Furman of Brooklyn, New York City surpassed their record. Tsuji was also goalkeeper for Gatas Brilhantes H.P., the Hello! Project futsal team.

In November 2003, the 16-year-old Tsuji released her first solo photobook, Nono. In May 2004, Tsunku announced the graduation of both Tsuji and Kago from Morning Musume and created the group W, featuring the pair. On August 1, 2004, they officially graduated from Morning Musume. She appeared in several episodes of Mini Moni's 2005 television series, Brementown Musicians. For a Christmas special, Tsuji contributed to Hello! Project Shirogumi, eventually embarking on the December 2005 ~A HAPPY NEW POWER!~ Concert Tour.

=== 2005–2007: W ===
In February 2006, photographs of Kago smoking were published to Friday Magazine. Additional controversy surfaced because she was two years below the Japanese legal smoking age; Hello! Project soon issued a press statement, stating that the singer had been "suspended indefinitely". The ban lasted an entire year. During this time, she was not allowed to speak to Kago and continued to make appearances on television.

Hello! Project's official website announced on January 30, 2007 that Tsuji would be voice-acting as a guest for Keroro Gunso the Super Movie 2: The Deep Sea Princess. She was scheduled to be double cast alongside Rika Ishikawa in "When Will You Return?" (『いつの日君帰る』, Itsu no Hi Kimi Kaeru), which opened on May 4, 2007 at the Nissei Theatre in Tokyo, where she was to perform until the 22nd, but due to gastroenteritis, she was eventually replaced by Hitomi Yoshizawa.

In March 2007, after Ai Kago's contract cancellation with Hello! Project, W disbanded. Several weeks later, news about Tsuji's new unit, Gyaruru, was released. It was intended to be made up of Tsuji alongside Ami Tokito and Gal Sone. Tsuji voiced Athena in the animation series Robby & Kerobby, and released a single "Koko ni Iruzee!" in May 2007 as the character, a cover version of the Morning Musume song by the same name.

=== 2007–2010: Solo and blogging career, marriage and family ===
On June 19, 2008, Tsuji made an appearance at the Yuko Nakazawa Birthday Live 2008 event, handing a birthday cake to Nakazawa. On January 30, 2009, Tsuji started an online blog on Ameba, the title of which is commonly rendered as either Non Peace or Non Piece (のんピース). It was well received and quickly became one of the most popular blogs on the website. A May 2009 survey concluded that she was voted "Best Mom" by Japanese middle and high school girls. Tsuji performed at Hello Pro Award '09 ~Elder Club Sotsugyō Kinen Special~ on February 1, 2009, her first concert performance in nearly two years.

=== 2011–present: Book and second child ===
On June 17, 2011, her 24th birthday, Tsuji released a book of essays under Kodansha Limited, Non-chanpuru -mother-. The book focuses on her experiences and advice concerning motherhood. Tsuji has stated that she would like to have more children.

On December 25, 2011, it was claimed that Tsuji was living separately from Suguira due to personal financial problems, although rumors of a divorce were denied. Tsuji's agency countered that the living arrangements were in preparation for her full-time return to the entertainment industry and had nothing to do with the state of her marriage.

== Personal life ==
In May 2007, she announced her engagement to Taiyo Sugiura, who she had met eleven months before. She also confirmed her pregnancy. A press conference was held in which both entertainers expressed their apologies to the public, amid praise and criticism coming from other renowned artists. Hitomi Yoshizawa, who worked alongside Tsuji while they were both in Morning Musume, replaced her and was forced to learn all the required lines for When Will You Return? in a relatively short period of time. Akiko Wada stated: "She says she's going out with the guy, going to get married, then reveals she's pregnant. It's all too neat. The kid has no sense of responsibility." Tsuji commented: "I will return to the public eye when things calm down after childbirth." Asami Abe was forced to fill her position in Gyaruru, and Risa Niigaki eventually played her role as Athena in Robby & Kerobby. Tsuji married Sugiura on June 21, 2007.

She changed her name to Nozomi Sugiura (杉浦 希美, Sugiura Nozomi), but continued to use her birthname professionally. The couple have five children, two daughters and three sons. Beginning in 2024, their eldest daughter Noa Sugiura has gained fame in Japan as a social media influencer.

== Discography ==
=== Single ===
#	Title	Release date
1	"Koko ni Iruzee!" (ここにいるぜぇ!)	2007-05-16

=== Album ===
#	Title	Release date
1	"Minna Happy! Mama no Uta" (みんなハッピー!ママのうた)	2010-11-24

=== Digital Releases ===
#	Title	Release date
1	"Bokutachi, Zespri Kiwi da ne." (ぼくたち、ゼスプリキウイだね。)	2009-09-15

== Acting career ==
=== Film ===
- Mini Moni ja Movie: Okashi na Daibōken! (2002)
- Keroro Gunso the Super Movie 2: The Deep Sea Princess (超劇場版 ケロロ軍曹２ 深海のプリンセスであります！, Chō Gekijōban Keroro Gunsō 2 Shinkai no Purinsesu de Arimasu!) (2007)
- Tokumei Sentai Go-Busters the Movie: Protect the Tokyo Enetower! (2012)

=== Television ===
- Hello! Morning (ハロー！モーニング。) (2000–2007)
- Futarigoto (二人ゴト)
- Angel Hearts (2002)
- Mini Moni's Brementown Musicians (ミニモニ。でブレーメンの音楽隊, Minimoni de Bremen no Ongakutai) (2004)
- Quiz! Hexagon II (クイズ！ヘキサゴンII) (2009–)
- Tokumei Sentai Go-Busters (2012 – ep 44)
- Inazuma Eleven

== Publications ==
=== Photobooks ===
#	Title	Release date	Publisher	ISBN	Photobook information
–	Nozomi Tsuji/ Kago Ai Shashinshū – "Tsuji Kago" (辻希美・加護亜依写真集 「辻加護」)	22 May 2002	Wani Books	ISBN 4-8470-2710-8	Duo photobook with Ai Kago
1	Tsuji Nozomi Shashinshū "Nono" (辻希美写真集 「のの♥」)	10 November 2003	Wani Books	ISBN 4-8470-2782-5	First solo photobook
2	Tsuji Nozomi Shashinshū "Non no 19" (辻希美写真集 「のんの19」)	18 November 2006	Takeshobo	ISBN 978-4-8124-2953-2	Second solo photobook
3	Tsuji Nozomi Shashinshū "Ribbon Days" (辻希美『辻ちゃんのリボンDays』)	10 October 2009	Takeshobo	ISBN 978-4-8470-1878-7	Third solo photobook

=== Others ===
Title	Release date	Publisher
U+U=W	4 December 2004	Takeshobo Co., Ltd
