= Morning Musume All Singles Complete: 10th Anniversary =

- Front Cover of Regular Edition

Compilation album by Morning Musume
- Released: October 24, 2007
- Recorded: 1998–2007
- Genre: J-pop; dance; electronica; rock; bubblegum pop; breakbeat; R&B
- Label: Zetima
- Producer: Tsunku

Morning Musume chronology
Sexy 8 Beat (2007)	Morning Musume All Singles Complete: 10th Anniversary (2007)	Cover You (2008)

Limited edition with DVD
- Front cover of limited edition.

Singles from Morning Musume All Singles Complete: 10th Anniversary
- 1. "Onna ni Sachi Are" Released: July 25, 2007

Morning Musume All Singles Complete: 10th Anniversary (モーニング娘。ALL SINGLES COMPLETE ～10th ANNIVERSARY～) is a compilation of the first 34 singles from the Japanese girl group Morning Musume, covering every A-side track from each of their singles since their major debut in 1997. It was released on October 24, 2007 in two editions; the normal edition contained only the two CDs, while the limited edition came with an alternative cover and a bonus DVD.

The cover of the regular edition is a recreation of the cover used for the single "Love Machine", and the limited edition cover is a recreation of the cover used for the single "Morning Coffee".

== Track listing ==
=== Disc 1 ===
1. Morning Coffee (モ－ニングコ－ヒ－)
2. Summer Night Town (サマーナイトタウン)
3. Daite Hold on Me! (抱いてHOLD ON ME!)
4. Memory Seishun no Hikari (Memory 青春の光)
5. Manatsu no Kōsen (真夏の光線)
6. Furusato (ふるさと)
7. Love Machine (LOVE マシ－ン)
8. Koi no Dance Site (恋のダンスサイト)
9. Happy Summer Wedding (ハッピ－サマ－ウェディング)
10. I Wish
11. Ren'ai Revolution 21 (恋愛レボリュ－ション21)
12. The Peace! (ザ☆ピ～ス！)
13. Mr. Moonlight: Ai no Big Band (Mr. Moonlight 〜愛のビッグバンド〜)
14. Sōda! We're Alive (そうだ！We're ALIVE)
15. Do It! Now
16. Koko ni Iruzee! (ここにいるぜぇ!)
17. Morning Musume no Hyokkori Hyōtanjima (モーニング娘。のひょっこりひょうたん島)

=== Disc 2 ===
1. As for One Day
2. Shabondama (シャボン玉)
3. Go Girl: Koi no Victory (Go Girl 〜恋のヴィクトリー〜)
4. Ai Araba It's All Right (愛あらばIT'S ALL RIGHT)
5. Roman: My Dear Boy (浪漫 〜MY DEAR BOY〜)
6. Joshi Kashimashi Monogatari (女子かしまし物語)
7. Namida ga Tomaranai Hōkago (涙が止まらない放課後)
8. The Manpower!!! (The マンパワー！！！)
9. Osaka Koi no Uta (大阪 恋の歌)
10. Iroppoi Jirettai (色っぽい じれったい)
11. Chokkan 2: Nogashita Sakana wa Ōkiizo! (直感2 〜逃した魚は大きいぞ!〜)
12. Sexy Boy: Soyokaze ni Yorisotte (SEXY BOY 〜そよ風に寄り添って〜)
13. Ambitious! Yashinteki de Ii Jan (Ambitious! 野心的でいいじゃん)
14. Aruiteru (歩いてる)
15. Egao Yes Nude (笑顔YESヌード)
16. Kanashimi Twilight (悲しみトワイライト)
17. Onna ni Sachi Are (女に 幸あれ)
18. Hello to You: Hello! Project 10 Shūnen Kinen Theme (HELLO TO YOU〜ハロー!プロジェクト10周年記念テーマ〜; "Hello to You: Hello! Project 10th Anniversary Theme")

=== Limited edition DVD ===
1. "I Wish" —Yuko Nakazawa
  - From Morning Musume Concert Tour 2001 "Live Revolution 21 Spring"
2. "Do It! Now" —Kaori Iida
  - From Morning Musume Concert Tour 2004 Spring "The Best of Japan"
3. "Koko ni Iruzee!" —Natsumi Abe
  - From Morning Musume Concert Tour 2003 Spring "Non Stop!"
4. "As for One Day" —Kei Yasuda
  - From Morning Musume Concert Tour 2003 Spring "Non Stop!"
5. "Do It! Now" —Maki Goto
  - From Morning Musume Concert Tour 2002 Summer "Love is Alive!"
6. "The Peace!" —Rika Ishikawa
  - From Morning Musume Concert Tour 2002 Summer "Love is Alive!"
7. "Sōda! We're Alive" —Hitomi Yoshizawa
  - From Morning Musume Concert Tour 2002 Summer "Love is Alive!"
8. "Do It! Now" —Ai Takahashi
  - From Morning Musume Concert Tour 2002 Summer "Love is Alive!"
9. "Ambitious! Yashinteki de Ii Jan" —Asami Konno
  - From Hello! Project 2006 Summer: Wonderful Hearts Land
10. "Mr. Moonlight: Ai no Big Band" —Risa Niigaki
  - From Hello! Project 2002: Kotoshi mo Sugoi zo!"
11. "Do It! Now" —Eri Kamei
  - From Morning Musume Concert Tour 2003 Spring "Non Stop!"
12. "Aruiteru" —Sayumi Michishige
  - From Morning Musume Concert Tour 2006 Autumn: Odore! Morning Curry
13. "Shabondama" —Reina Tanaka
  - From Morning Musume Concert Tour "The Best of Japan Summer - Autumn '04"
14. "Iroppoi Jirettai" —Koharu Kusumi
  - From Morning Musume Concert Tour 2005 Summer Autumn "Baribari Kyōshitsu: Koharu-chan Irasshai!"
15. "Shabondama" —Aika Mitsui
  - From Morning Musume Concert Tour 2006 Autumn: Odore! Morning Curry
16. "Egao Yes Nude" —Junjun
  - From Morning Musume Concert Tour 2007 Spring: Sexy 8 Beat
17. "Onna ni Sachi Are" —Linlin
  - From Hello! Project 2007 Summer 10th Anniversary Daikansha-sai: Hello☆Pro Natsu Matsuri

== Oricon rank and sales ==
Daily	Weekly	Sales
3	6	47,130
