= Sexy 8 Beat =

- Front cover of regular edition.

Studio album by Morning Musume
- Released: March 21, 2007 (JP); April 27, 2007 (TW)
- Genre: J-pop; pop rock; dance-rock; electronica; dance; R&B
- Length: 48:15
- Label: Zetima Records (JP); EPCE-5458~9 (CD+DVD); EPCE-5460 (regular edition); Forward Music (TW); 07-20482 (CD+DVD); 07-20482-1 (regular edition)
- Producer: Tsunku

Morning Musume chronology
7.5 Fuyu Fuyu Morning Musume Mini! (2006)	Sexy 8 Beat (2007)	Morning Musume All Singles Complete: 10th Anniversary (2007)

Limited edition with DVD
- Front cover of limited edition.

Singles from Sexy 8 Beat
- 1. "Sexy Boy (Soyokaze ni Yorisotte)" Released: March 15, 2006; 2. "Ambitious! Yashinteki de Ii Jan" Released: June 21, 2006; 3. "Aruiteru" Released: November 8, 2006; 4. "Egao Yes Nude" Released: February 14, 2007

Sexy 8 Beat (stylized as SEXY 8 BEAT) is the eighth studio album by the J-pop girl group Morning Musume.

== Overview ==
It is the first album to feature 8th generation member Aika Mitsui and the last full-length studio release to feature 4th generation member Hitomi Yoshizawa as the group's leader and 6th generation member Miki Fujimoto as both the group's subleader. The album was released on March 21, 2007.

The album features the band's previous four singles "Aruiteru" (which also appeared on the EP 7.5 Fuyu Fuyu Morning Musume Mini! in December 2006), "Egao Yes Nude", "Sexy Boy: Soyokaze ni Yorisotte" and "Ambitious! Yashinteki de Ii Jan". Also, as with Rainbow 7 and 7.5 Fuyu Fuyu..., tracks by four different sub-factions of the group are featured, including a solo track by Yoshizawa and the third pairing of Sayumi Michishige and Koharu Kusumi as their alter-egos "Shige-pinku" and "Koha-pinku" (first established on Rainbow 7's "Rainbow Pink").

The limited edition of the album includes a DVD; a bonus CD was also rumored for this edition but never materialized. The first pressing of the regular edition came with two photo cards.

== Track listing ==
All tracks are written by Tsunku

No.	Title	Length
1.	"Genki+ (元気＋, "Energy+")"	04:55
2.	"Aruiteru (歩いてる, Walking) (Album Edit)"	05:42
3.	"Mirai no Taiyō (未来の太陽, "Sunny Future")"	04:39
4.	"Egao Yes Nude (笑顔Yesヌード, Smile Yes Nude) (Album Mix)"	04:08
5.	"Haru Beautiful Every Day (春 ビューティフル エブリディ, "Spring Beautiful Every Day")" (Performed by Eri Kamei and Aika Mitsui)	04:23
6.	"Sexy Boy (Soyokaze ni Yorisotte) (SEXY BOY 〜そよ風に寄り添って〜, Sexy Boy (Cuddling in the Gentle Breeze))"	04:13
7.	"Ambitious! Yashinteki de Ii Jan (Ambitious！野心的でいいじゃん, Ambitious! Ambition is Good)"	04:12
8.	"Sono Deai no Tame ni (その出会いのために, "Because of That Meeting")" (Performed by Hitomi Yoshizawa with Morning Musume)	04:11
9.	"Shanimuni Paradise (シャニムニ パラダイス, "Reckless Paradise")" (Performed by Ai Takahashi, Miki Fujimoto, Risa Niigaki, and Reina Tanaka)	04:59
10.	"Takara no Hako (宝の箱, "Treasure Chest")" (Performed by Sayumi Michishige and Koharu Kusumi)	04:18
11.	"Be Positive! (BE ポジティブ!)"	04:34

=== Bonus DVD (Limited edition only) ===
Tracks 2 and 3 on the DVD were recorded live at Hello! Project's 2007 Winter Wonderful Hearts Otome Gokoro concert.

No.	Title	Length
1.	"Egao Yes Nude (Close-up Ver.)"
2.	"Ambitious! Yashinteki de Ii Jan"
3.	"Do It! Now"

== Personnel ==
=== Vocals ===
- Hitomi Yoshizawa – except tracks 5, 9 and 10
- Ai Takahashi – except tracks 5 and 10
- Risa Niigaki – except tracks 5 and 10
- Miki Fujimoto – except tracks 5 and 10
- Eri Kamei – except tracks 9 and 10
- Sayumi Michishige – except tracks 5 and 9
- Reina Tanaka – except tracks 5 and 10
- Koharu Kusumi – except tracks 5 and 9
- Aika Mitsui – except tracks 2, 6, 7, 8 and 10
- Asami Konno – tracks 6 and 7, uncredited
- Makoto Ogawa – tracks 6 and 7, uncredited
- Tsunku – chorus (tracks 2, 4, 6, 9, 10, and 11)
- Hiroaki Takeuchi – chorus (tracks 1, 2, 3, 4, 6, 7, 10, and 11)
- Chino – chorals (tracks 5 and 9)

=== Arrangers ===
- Hideyuki "Daichi" Suzuki – tracks 1 and 2; programming and guitar
- Shōichirō Hirata – track 3; programming
- Hiroshi Matsui – track 4 and 11; programming and keyboards
- Yuichi Takahashi – tracks 5 and 6; programming and guitar
- Kōichi Yuasa – track 7; programming
- Akira – track 8; programming
- Takashi Morio – track 9; programming
- Shunsuke Suzuki – track 10; programming and guitar

=== Instruments ===
- Yoshinari Takejō – tenor saxophone (track 2)
- Kōji – guitar (tracks 7 and 9)
- Akio Suzuki – saxophone (track 11)
- Kōichi Korenaga – guitar (tracks 4 and 11)

== Oricon ranks and sales ==
Chart	Position	Sales
Daily	3	31,819
Weekly	7	31,819
