= Koi wa Hassō Do the Hustle! =

Song by Morning Musume
- Released: October 26, 2005 (postponed); November 9, 2005
- Recorded: 2005
- Genre: J-pop
- Label: Zetima
- Songwriter: Tsunku
- Composer: Tsunku
- Producer: Tsunku

"Koi wa Hassō Do the Hustle!" (恋は発想 Do the Hustle!) was the original title track for the twenty-eighth single, "Chokkan 2 (Nogashita Sakana wa Ōkiizo!)", of the J-pop idol group Morning Musume, but for unannounced reasons, it was changed to the second track. Speculation has been that previews were received poorly, so to try to gain a new market of fans, it was changed to a song popular at their concerts.

On May 2, 2007, the previously unreleased promotional video for the song was released on Eizō The Morning Musume 4 ~Single M Clips~ (映像ザ・モーニング娘。2～シングルMクリップス～), a DVD collection of Morning Musume's music videos.

== Members at time of song ==
- 4th generation: Hitomi Yoshizawa
- 5th generation: Ai Takahashi, Asami Konno, Makoto Ogawa, Risa Niigaki
- 6th generation: Miki Fujimoto, Eri Kamei, Sayumi Michishige, Reina Tanaka
- 7th generation: Koharu Kusumi

== See also ==
- Chokkan 2 ~Nogashita Sakana wa Ōkiizo!~
