= Sexy Boy (Soyokaze ni Yorisotte) =

Single by Morning Musume

from the album Sexy 8 Beat
- Released: March 15, 2006 (JP)
- Recorded: 2006
- Genre: Japanese pop; electropop; dance; techno
- Length: 11:20
- Label: Zetima
- Songwriter: Tsunku
- Producer: Tsunku

Morning Musume singles chronology
"Chokkan 2 (Nogashita Sakana wa Ōkiizo!)" (2005)	"Sexy Boy (Soyokaze ni Yorisotte)" (2006)	"Ambitious! Yashinteki de Ii Jan" (2006)

Music video
- Sexy Boy (Soyokaze ni Yorisotte) on YouTube

Limited edition cover

"Sexy Boy (Soyokaze ni Yorisotte)" (SEXY BOY 〜そよ風に寄り添って〜, Sekushii Bōi ~Soyokaze ni Yorisotte~; Sexy Boy (Cuddling in the Gentle Breeze)) is the twenty-ninth single of J-pop group Morning Musume. It was released on March 15, 2006, in two editions—a normal edition, and a limited edition with five photo cards featuring the members in duos and came in special packaging. The single reached a peak of #4 on the weekly Oricon charts, and lasted in the charts for 8 weeks.

== Theme, music video and choreography ==
As suggested by its title and lyric, the song portrays the "feeling of the speed of a spring whirlwind"; the song's protagonist is a princess cruising over the spring ocean.

The Single V was released on March 29, 2006.

Reina Tanaka is shown modelling the choreography for the PV in additional pictures. Part of this dance, the characteristic "ue ue" (上 上, sometimes written "↑↑"; "up up") motion of pointing one's index fingers up in the air, is often imitated by fans at concerts.

== Track listings ==
=== CD ===
1. "Sexy Boy (Soyokaze ni Yorisotte)" (SEXY BOY 〜そよ風に寄り添って〜, Sexy Boy (Cuddling in the Gentle Breeze))
2. "Chance Chance Boogie" (チャンス チャンス ブギ)
3. "Sexy Boy (Soyokaze ni Yorisotte)" (Instrumental)

=== Single V VD ===
1. "Sexy Boy (Soyokaze ni Yorisotte)"
2. "Sexy Boy (Soyokaze ni Yorisotte) (Dance Shot Ver.)"
3. "Making Of" (メイキング映像)

== Oricon Rank and Sales Charts ==
=== CD ===
Daily	Weekly	Sales
2	4	48,667

== Members at time of single ==
- 4th generation: Hitomi Yoshizawa
- 5th generation: Ai Takahashi, Asami Konno, Makoto Ogawa, Risa Niigaki
- 6th generation: Miki Fujimoto, Eri Kamei, Sayumi Michishige, Reina Tanaka
- 7th generation: Koharu Kusumi

== Personnel ==
- Hitomi Yoshizawa – minor vocals
- Ai Takahashi – main vocals
- Asami Konno – minor vocals
- Makoto Ogawa – minor vocals
- Risa Niigaki – minor vocals
- Miki Fujimoto – main vocals
- Eri Kamei – center vocals
- Sayumi Michishige – minor vocals
- Reina Tanaka – main vocals
- Koharu Kusumi – center vocals
- Tsunku – lyrics and composition
- Yuichi Takahashi – arrangement
