= Sōda! We're Alive =

Single by Morning Musume

from the album 4th Ikimashoi!
- Released: February 21, 2002
- Recorded: 2001–2002
- Genre: J-pop; electropop; dance-pop
- Length: 14:25
- Label: Zetima
- Songwriter: Tsunku
- Producer: Tsunku

Morning Musume singles chronology
"Mr. Moonlight: Ai no Big Band" (2001)	"Sōda! We're Alive" (2002)	"Do It! Now" (2002)

Music video
- "Sōda! We're Alive" on YouTube

"Sōda! We're Alive" (そうだ！We're Alive, Sōda! Wia Araibu; That's Right! We're Alive) is the fourteenth single of J-Pop idol group Morning Musume. It was released on February 21, 2002 and sold a total of 443,630 copies. The B-side is a re-recorded and re-arranged version of the band's their first single, "Morning Coffee", featuring the then-current lineup. The single peaked at number one on the Oricon Charts. The single was first single for the group of the year 2002

== Track listing ==
All lyrics are composed by Tsunku. Released as a double-A single and a Single V DVD.

- CD single
1. "Sōda! We're Alive" (そうだ！We're Alive)
2. "Morning Coffee" (2002 Version) (モーニングコーヒー (2002version))
3. "Sōda! We're Alive" (Instrumental)
- Single V DVD
1. "Sōda! We're Alive" (そうだ！We're Alive)
2. "Making of" (メイキング映像)

== Members at the time of single ==
- 1st generation: Kaori Iida, Natsumi Abe
- 2nd generation: Kei Yasuda, Mari Yaguchi
- 3rd generation: Maki Goto
- 4th generation: Rika Ishikawa, Hitomi Yoshizawa, Nozomi Tsuji, Ai Kago
- 5th generation: Ai Takahashi, Asami Konno, Makoto Ogawa, Risa Niigaki

== Certifications ==
Certifications for "Sōda! We're Alive"
Region	Certification	Certified units/sales
Japan (RIAJ)	Platinum	443,630
