= Chokkan 2 (Nogashita Sakana wa Ōkiizo!) =

Single by Morning Musume

from the album Rainbow 7
- Released: November 9, 2005
- Recorded: 2005
- Genre: J-pop; techno-pop; dance-pop; pop rock
- Length: 13:28
- Label: Zetima
- Songwriter: Tsunku
- Producer: Tsunku

Morning Musume singles chronology
"Iroppoi Jirettai" (2005)	"Chokkan 2 (Nogashita Sakana wa Ōkiizo!)" (2005)	"Sexy Boy (Soyokaze ni Yorisotte)" (2006)

Music video
- Chokkan 2 (Nogashita Sakana wa Ōkiizo!) on YouTube

"Chokkan 2 (Nogashita Sakana wa Ōkiizo!)" (直感２～逃した魚は大きいぞ！～; "Intuition 2 (The Fish We Let Slip Was Huge!)") is the twenty-eighth single of J-pop group Morning Musume and was released November 9, 2005. It peaked at #4 on the weekly Oricon chart, charting for seven weeks. The limited edition of this single came with five photo cards featuring two members on each card and came in special packaging.

== History ==
The single's standard cover features the girls as numbers on a mobile phone keypad. The title track was originally from their sixth album Ai no Dai 6 Kan, titled "Chokkan (Toki Toshite Koi wa)". Originally, the title track was going to be the coupling track, "Koi wa Hassō Do the Hustle!", but was changed due to unpopularity during live concert performances shortly prior to the single's release. Tsunku later stated that the original song had been such a success during the group's 2005 spring tour that he also wanted to add it to the autumn tour's set-list. While watching footage of the autumn tour, which he did not attend, he came up with the lyrics to what would later become Chokkan 2, wondering if all of the excitement during the performance of the song was a "message from the fans." As well as new lyrics, the song was given an altered dance routine. Yet another remix of the song, "Chokkan 2 (Nogashita Sakana wa Ookiizo! (Mattaku Sono Toori Remix))", appeared on their seventh album Rainbow 7, released in February 2006.

Random copies of the initial pressing of the single contained a special card purchasers could fill out and send in, to try to win a limited edition poster of the member of their choice (limited to 1,000 posters of each member, a total of 10,000 posters were to be given away). In mid-December, the posters were sent to the winning entrants.

== Track listing ==
All tracks are written by Tsunku.

CD
No.	Title	Arranger	Length
1.	"Chokkan 2 (Nogashita Sakana wa Ōkiizo!)" (直感２～逃した魚は大きいぞ！～, "Intuition 2 (The Fish We Let Slip was Huge!)")	Shunsuke Suzuki	4:33
2.	"Koi wa Hassō Do the Hustle!" (恋は発想 Do The Hustle!, "Love is a Concept - Do the Hustle!")	Hideyuki "Daichi" Suzuki
3.	"Chokkan 2 (Nogashita Sakana wa Ōkiizo!) (Instrumental)"	—

Single V DVD
No.	Title	Length
1.	"Chokkan 2 (Nogashita Sakana wa Ōkiizo!)"
2.	"Chokkan 2 (Nogashita Sakana wa Ōkiizo!) (Close-up Ver.)"
3.	"Meikingu Eizō" (メイキング映像, "Making Of")

== Personnel ==
- Hitomi Yoshizawa – minor vocals
- Ai Takahashi – main vocals
- Asami Konno – minor vocals
- Makoto Ogawa – minor vocals
- Risa Niigaki – minor vocals
- Miki Fujimoto – main vocals
- Eri Kamei – main vocals
- Sayumi Michishige – main vocals
- Reina Tanaka – main vocals
- Koharu Kusumi – main vocals

Track 1

- Shunsuke Suzuki (all instruments, arrangement)
- Hiroshi Iida (gong, shime-daiko
- Ogu (of 7House - chorus, nagado-daiko)
- Tsunku (chorus)

Track 2

- Shunsuke Suzuki (sitar)
- Hiroshi Iida (percussion)
- Hideyuki "Daichi" Suzuki (programming, guitar, arrangement)
- CHNO (chorus)
- Hiroaki Takeuchi (chorus)

== Members at time of single ==
- 4th generation: Hitomi Yoshizawa
- 5th generation: Ai Takahashi, Asami Konno, Makoto Ogawa, Risa Niigaki
- 6th generation: Miki Fujimoto, Eri Kamei, Sayumi Michishige, Reina Tanaka
- 7th generation: Koharu Kusumi
