= Osaka Koi no Uta =

Single by Morning Musume

from the album Rainbow 7
- Released: April 27, 2005
- Recorded: 2005
- Genre: J-pop; electropop; dance-pop
- Length: 11:37
- Label: Zetima
- Songwriter: Tsunku
- Producer: Tsunku

Morning Musume singles chronology
"The Manpower!!!" (2005)	"Osaka Koi no Uta" (2005)	"Iroppoi Jirettai" (2005)

Music video
- "Osaka Koi no Uta" on YouTube

"Osaka Koi no Uta" (大阪 恋の歌; "Osaka Love Song") was the twenty-sixth single of J-pop girl group Morning Musume, from the group's seventh album Rainbow 7. It was released on April 27, 2005 under the Zetima label, and went on to sell a total of 59,287 copies. The single reached a peak of #2 on the weekly Oricon chart, charting for five weeks. The Single V, released on the same day, went on to sell a total of 30,324 copies. The Single V reached a peak of #6 on the weekly Oricon chart, charting for four weeks.

== History ==
The limited edition of the single came in special packaging, and both the limited and first press of the normal edition came with photocards featuring members of the group (the limited edition containing five cards, while the normal edition only contained one). Buyers of the single or Single V were given the opportunity to send in a form to be eligible for a chance to receive a special 8 cm CD (limited to 10,000 copies) containing Ishikawa's comments on her graduation.

The titular song is sung in Osaka-ben. Producer Tsunku wrote all lyrics on the single and composed both songs, with arrangement by Hideyuki "Daichi" Suzuki and Yuichi Takahashi. The song's lyrics are meant to sound and mean different things in different languages. As producer, Tsunku asked the girls to study about Osaka in preparation for the single. The coupling song, "Nature is Good!", was used as the theme and image song for the Asahi Broadcasting Corporation's programme "Gurasu no Chikyū o Sukue" (ガラスの地球を救え, Save the Glass Planet) between April and June 2005.

This was the first single since the departure of the final founding member, Kaori Iida, and the last single to feature Rika Ishikawa, who graduated to focus on her activities within V-u-den. This was also Mari Yaguchi's last single with the group, prior to her shock immediate departure two weeks before the release of the single, due to a scandal she was involved in. The CD artwork does, however, still feature Yaguchi, as does the music video.

The song was covered by Tsunku on his album Type 2. Member Ai Takahashi performed a solo version of the song at Morning Musume's spring 2006 concert.

== Track listings ==
All tracks are written by Tsunku.

CD
No.	Title	Length
1.	"Osaka Koi no Uta" (大阪 恋の歌, "Osaka Love Song")	4:15
2.	"Nature is Good!"
3.	"Osaka Koi no Uta (Instrumental)"

Single V DVD
No.	Title	Length
1.	"Osaka Koi no Uta"
2.	"Osaka Koi no Uta (Dance Shot Ver.)"
3.	"Meikingu Eizō" (メイキング映像, "Making Of")

== Charts ==
=== CD ===
Chart (2005)	Peak position
Oricon Daily Singles	1
Oricon Weekly Singles	2

=== Single V DVD ===
Chart (2005)	Peak position
Oricon Daily DVD Music	2
Oricon Weekly DVD Music	2

== Personnel ==
- Mari Yaguchi – minor vocals
- Rika Ishikawa – main vocals
- Hitomi Yoshizawa – minor vocals
- Ai Takahashi – main vocals
- Asami Konno – minor vocals
- Makoto Ogawa – minor vocals
- Risa Niigaki – center vocals
- Miki Fujimoto – main vocals
- Eri Kamei – minor vocals
- Sayumi Michishige – minor vocals
- Reina Tanaka – center vocals

Track 1

- Atsuko Inaba (chorus)
- Tsunku (chorus)
- Hideyuki "Daichi" Suzuki (programming, guitar, arrangement)

Track 2

- Yuichi Takahashi (arrangement)

== Members at time of single ==
- 2nd generation: Mari Yaguchi (last single)
- 4th generation: Rika Ishikawa (last single), Hitomi Yoshizawa
- 5th generation: Ai Takahashi, Asami Konno, Makoto Ogawa, Risa Niigaki
- 6th generation: Miki Fujimoto, Eri Kamei, Sayumi Michishige, Reina Tanaka
