= Ambitious! Yashinteki de Ii Jan =

Single by Morning Musume

from the album Sexy 8 Beat
- Released: June 21, 2006
- Recorded: 2006
- Genre: J-pop; dance-rock; electro
- Label: Zetima
- Songwriter(s): Tsunku
- Producer(s): Tsunku

Morning Musume singles chronology
"Sexy Boy (Soyokaze ni Yorisotte)" (2006)	"Ambitious! Yashinteki de Ii Jan" (2006)	"Aruiteru" (2006)

Limited edition cover

Music video
- Ambitious! Yashinteki de Ii Jan on YouTube

"Ambitious! Yashinteki de Ii Jan" (Ambitious！野心的でいいじゃん, Anbishasu! Yashinteki de Ii jan, "Ambitious! Ambition Is Good") is the thirtieth single of J-pop idol group Morning Musume. It was released on June 21, 2006. The Single V was released on June 28, 2006.

== Overview ==
There are regular and limited edition versions of this single. The regular version comes with a photocard in a poker card design. The limited edition comes with a DVD containing comments from the members and two performances from their Rainbow 7 concert tour, Aozora ga Itsumademo Tsuzuku You na Mirai de Are! and Sexy Boy (Soyokaze ni Yorisotte). It also came with 10 interchangeable covers, one featuring each member.

This is the last single to feature 5th generation graduated members Asami Konno and Makoto Ogawa, after which Sayumi Michishige and Risa Niigaki respectively took their solos in live performances of the song.

== Track listings ==
=== CD ===
1. "Ambitious! Yashinteki de Ii Jan" (Ambitious！野心的でいいじゃん, It's Good to be Ambitious!)
2. "Watashi ga Tsuiteru." (わたしがついてる。, I'll Follow You)
3. "Ambitious! Yashinteki de Ii Jan" (Instrumental)

=== Limited Edition DVD ===
Performances from Morning Musume Concert Tour 2006 Haru ~Rainbow Seven~

1. "Sexy Boy (Soyokaze ni Yorisotte)" (SEXY BOY ~そよ風に寄り添って~)
2. "Aozora ga Itsumademo Tsuzuku You na Mirai de Are!" (青空がいつまでも続くような未来であれ!)
3. "Member Comments" (メンバーコメント)

=== Single V DVD ===
1. "Ambitious! Yashinteki de Ii Jan"
2. "Ambitious! Yashinteki de Ii Jan (Dance Shot Ver.)"
3. "Making Of" (メイキング映像)

== Members at time of single ==
- 4th generation: Hitomi Yoshizawa
- 5th generation: Ai Takahashi, Asami Konno (last single), Makoto Ogawa (last single), Risa Niigaki
- 6th generation: Miki Fujimoto, Eri Kamei, Sayumi Michishige, Reina Tanaka
- 7th generation: Koharu Kusumi
