= Ai Araba It's All Right =

Single by Morning Musume

from the album Best! Morning Musume 2
- Released: January 21, 2004 (JP)
- Recorded: 2003
- Genre: J-pop
- Length: 12:27
- Label: Zetima
- Songwriter: Tsunku
- Producer: Tsunku

Morning Musume singles chronology
"Go Girl (Koi no Victory)" (2003)	"Ai Araba It's All Right" (2004)	"Roman (My Dear Boy)" (2004)

Music video
- "Ai Araba It's All Right" on YouTube

"Ai Araba It's All Right" (愛あらば It's All Right, Ai Araba Ittsu Ōru Raito; "If There's Love It's All Right"), commonly abbreviated to "AiAra", is the twenty-first single of J-pop group Morning Musume; both the single itself and the Single V were released on January 21, 2004. It sold a total of 108,368 copies, reaching a peak of #2 on the weekly Oricon charts and charting for seven weeks, while the Single V reached a peak of #6 and charted for eight weeks on the Oricon DVD charts. The single placed 89th on the overall year's chart for 2004. The single also marked the graduation of one of the founding members of Morning Musume, Natsumi Abe, who also went on to have a solo career within Hello! Project. The limited edition comes with a 52-page photobook featuring the members and comes in the special packaging what Hello Project solo singers and bands have used before.

The B-side, "Dekiru Onna", features a vocal and instrumental arrangement heavily inspired by Queen.

The single was certified Gold by RIAJ for physical sales of over 100,000 units.

== Track listings ==
1. "Ai Araba It's All Right" (愛あらば It's All Right; "If There's Love It's All Right")
  - Lyrics & composition: Tsunku / arrangement: Takao Konishi
2. "Dekiru Onna" (出来る女; "Able Girl")
  - Lyrics & composition: Tsunku / arrangement: Shunsuke Suzuki
3. "Ai Araba It's All Right" (Instrumental)

== Members at time of single ==
- 1st generation: Kaori Iida, Natsumi Abe (last single)
- 2nd generation: Mari Yaguchi
- 4th generation: Rika Ishikawa, Hitomi Yoshizawa, Nozomi Tsuji, Ai Kago
- 5th generation: Ai Takahashi, Asami Konno, Makoto Ogawa, Risa Niigaki
- 6th generation: Miki Fujimoto, Eri Kamei, Sayumi Michishige, Reina Tanaka

== Personnel ==
- Kaori Iida – center vocals
- Natsumi Abe – main vocals
- Mari Yaguchi – center vocals
- Rika Ishikawa – center vocals
- Hitomi Yoshizawa – center vocals
- Nozomi Tsuji – minor vocals
- Ai Kago – main vocals
- Ai Takahashi – main vocals
- Asami Konno – minor vocals
- Makoto Ogawa – center vocals
- Risa Niigaki – center vocals
- Miki Fujimoto – center vocals
- Eri Kamei – center vocals
- Sayumi Michishige – minor vocals
- Reina Tanaka – center vocals

=== Track 1 ===
- Takao Konishi – programming
- Tsuyoshi Katsuura – manipulator
- Shirō Sasaki – trumpet
- Wakaba Kawai – trombone
- Takahiro Kaneko – tenor saxophone
- Kōju Yamamoto – alto saxophone

=== Track 2 ===
- Shunsuke Suzuki – programming & guitar
- Sting Miyamoto – bass
- Yasuharu Nakanishi – Hammond organ
- Atsuko Inaba – chorus
