= 7.5 Fuyu Fuyu Morning Musume Mini! =

- Cover to the standard edition of the EP

EP by Morning Musume
- Released: December 13, 2006 (JP); January 3, 2007 (TW)
- Genre: Japanese pop
- Length: 29:41
- Label: Zetima
- Producer: Tsunku

Morning Musume chronology
Rainbow 7 (2006)	7.5 Fuyu Fuyu Morning Musume Mini! (2006)	Sexy 8 Beat (2007)

Alternate edition w/bonus DVD
- Front cover of alternate edition

Singles from 7.5 Fuyu Fuyu Morning Musume Mini!
- 1. "Aruiteru" Released: November 8, 2006

7.5 Fuyu Fuyu Morning Musume Mini! (7.5冬冬モーニング娘。ミニ!, "7.5 Winter Winter Morning Musume Mini!") is the first mini-album to be released by the J-pop idol group Morning Musume.

== Overview ==
It was released on December 13, 2006. The album was released in two versions– a standard edition, containing only the CD (with a photocard included with the first press editions), and a limited edition containing a bonus DVD.

This mini-album is considered to be their "7.5th album", as it was released between their seventh and eighth albums. All of the tracks were written and composed by Tsunku. The songs were composed to have a "wintry" feel, and the single "Aruiteru", their last single of 2006, was added to the track list. Since eighth-generation member Aika Mitsui did not officially join the group until December 10, three days before the EP was released, she did not participate in the recording.

The EP features five tracks by solo and or smaller combinations of band members, the second Morning Musume non-single release since Rainbow 7 to do so.

== Track listing ==
=== CD ===
1. "Aruiteru" (歩いてる, "Walking")
2. "Kira Kira Fuyu no Shiny G" (キラキラ冬のシャイニーG, Kira Kira Fuyu no Shainii Gāru)
  - Performed by Reina Tanaka
3. "Yuki / Ai × Anata ≧ Suki" (雪／愛×あなた≧好き, Ai Bun no Yuki Kakeru Anata Dainari Ikōru Suki)
  - Performed by Ai Takahashi, with spoken-word intro and outro by MC Gaki (Risa Niigaki)
4. "Samui Kara Fuyu Da mon! (Dōmo Kōmo Naissu yo Mikitty)" (寒いから冬だもん!～どうもこうもないっすよミキティ～)
  - Performed by Miki Fujimoto with Chisato Okai and Mai Hagiwara of Cute
5. "Kotatsu no Uta: Jyuken Story" (コタツの歌～jyuken story～)
  - Performed by Hitomi Yoshizawa, Eri Kamei and Risa Niigaki
6. "Wa: Merry Pin Xmas!" (わ～MerryピンXmas!)
  - Performed by Sayumi Michishige and Koharu Kusumi

=== Limited Edition DVD ===
Performances from Morning Musume Concert Tour 2006 Aki ~Odore! Morning Curry~

1. "Odore! Morning Curry" (踊れ! モーニングカレー)
2. "Aruiteru" (歩いてる, "Walking")
