= Morning Musume no Hyokkori Hyōtanjima =

Single by Morning Musume

from the album Best! Morning Musume 2
- Released: February 19, 2003 (Japan CD, DVD, VHS)
- Recorded: 2003
- Genre: Japanese pop
- Length: 10:56
- Label: Zetima; EPBE-5059 (DVD); EPVE-5059 (VHS)
- Composer: Urano Seichirou
- Lyricists: Inoue Hisashi, Yamamoto Yaushisa
- Producer: Tsunku

Music video
- "Morning Musume no Hyokkori Hyōtanjima" on YouTube

"Morning Musume no Hyokkori Hyōtanjima" (モーニング娘。のひょっこりひょうたん島, Mōningu Musume no Hyokkori Hyōtanjima; Morning Musume's Unexpected Contradiction Island) was the seventeenth single of J-pop idol group Morning Musume and was released February 19, 2003. It sold a total of 151,342 copies, reaching number four on the Oricon Charts. The title song was first performed live on NCON, a traditional school choir contest promoted by NHK, and later on other shows Minna no Uta where this song made their its TV appearances.

This single is a cover of the theme song to a famous children's puppet show from the 1960s, called Hyokkori Hyoutanjima (ひょっこりひょうたん島).

== Track listing ==
=== CD ===
1. "Morning Musume no Hyokkori Hyōtanjima" (モーニング娘。のひょっこりひょうたん島, Morning Musume's Unexpected Contradiction Island)
2. "Hōseki Bako" (宝石箱, Jewelry Box)
3. "Morning Musume no Hyokkori Hyōtanjima" (Instrumental)

=== Single V DVD ===
1. "Morning Musume no Hyokkori Hyōtanjima"
2. "Making Of" (メイキング映像)

== Members at time of single ==
- 1st generation: Kaori Iida, Natsumi Abe
- 2nd generation: Kei Yasuda, Mari Yaguchi
- 4th generation: Rika Ishikawa, Hitomi Yoshizawa, Nozomi Tsuji, Ai Kago
- 5th generation: Ai Takahashi, Asami Konno, Makoto Ogawa, Risa Niigaki

== See also ==
- Hyōtanjima
