= Egao Yes Nude =

Single by Morning Musume

from the album Sexy 8 Beat
- Released: February 14, 2007 (JP)
- Recorded: 2007
- Genre: J-pop; hip hop; dance-pop
- Label: Zetima
- Producer(s): Tsunku

Morning Musume singles chronology
"Aruiteru" (2006)	"Egao Yes Nude" (2007)	"Kanashimi Twilight" (2007)

Music video
- Egao Yes Nude on YouTube

"Egao Yes Nude" (笑顔YESヌード, Egao Yes Nūdo, "Smile Yes Nude") is the thirty-second single of the J-pop group Morning Musume. It was released on February 14, 2007. It was at first rumored to be the last single to feature Hitomi Yoshizawa (leader until May 6, 2007) but this was disproved. It is the first for the eighth generation Aika Mitsui.

There are three different versions of the single. Limited edition A includes a bonus DVD and has catalog number EPCE-5450~1. Limited edition B comes in a special package with a 32-page photo booklet and has catalog number EPCE-5452. The regular edition has catalog number EPCE-5453, and the first press of this edition has a photo card included.

The Single V was released on March 7, 2007, and the limited edition included a photocard of Mitsui.

The total sales of the CD single were 53,047, which peaked at number four on the Oricon Charts.

== Details ==
- This is the first single of Aika Mitsui, making the total member count nine people.
- The song's first appearance on TV was Utaban on February 8, 2007.
- "Sayonara no Kawari ni" is the first cover song since "Morning Musume no Hyokkori Hyōtanjima", and it was also the opening song for the mini-drama Arigatō o Tsutaetai (broadcast on Oha Suta).
- The jacket represents the B-side.
- The packaging resembled the packaging used for Bokura ga Ikiru My Asia.
- The name refers to a naked smile/an honest face, or as known in Japanese, "sugao" (素顔).

== Track listings ==
=== CD ===
1. "Egao Yes Nude" (笑顔Yesヌード, Smile Yes Nude)
2. "Sayonara no Kawari ni" (サヨナラのかわりに, Instead of Goodbye)
3. "Egao Yes Nude (instrumental)"

=== DVD ===
1. "Egao Yes Nude"
2. "Egao Yes Nude (Dance Shot Ver.)"
3. "Making of" (メイキング映像)

== Members at time of single ==
- 4th generation: Hitomi Yoshizawa
- 5th generation: Ai Takahashi, Risa Niigaki
- 6th generation: Miki Fujimoto, Eri Kamei, Sayumi Michishige, Reina Tanaka
- 7th generation: Koharu Kusumi
- 8th generation (debut): Aika Mitsui

== Personnel ==
- Hitomi Yoshizawa – main vocals
- Ai Takahashi – main vocals
- Risa Niigaki – main vocals
- Miki Fujimoto – main vocals
- Eri Kamei – minor vocals
- Sayumi Michishige – minor vocals
- Reina Tanaka – center vocals
- Koharu Kusumi – center vocals
- Aika Mitsui – center vocals
- Koichi Korenaga – guitar
- Hiroshi Matsui – programming & keyboard
- Hiroaki Takeuchi – backing vocals (chorus)
- Tsunku – backing vocals (chorus)
