= Do It! Now =

Single by Morning Musume

from the album No. 5
- Released: July 24, 2002 (JP)
- Recorded: 2002
- Genre: J-pop; R&B; electropop; electro dance
- Length: 12:55
- Label: Zetima
- Songwriter(s): Tsunku
- Producer(s): Tsunku

Morning Musume singles chronology
"Sōda! We're Alive" (2002)	"Do It! Now" (2002)	"Koko ni Iruzee!" (2002)

Music video
- "Do It! Now" on YouTube

"Do It! Now" is the 15th single of J-pop idol group Morning Musume and was released July 24, 2002. It sold a total of 310,600 copies.

== Overview ==
This single also marked the last appearance of Maki Goto before she graduated from Morning Musume and pursued a solo career within Hello! Project. This song broke the string of #1 hits originating from 1999's Love Machine, receiving a #3 position on Oricon.

An English-language cover was recorded by Mylin for the album Cover Morning Musume Hello! Project!.

== Track listing ==
1. "Do It! Now"
2. "Chotto Ikashita Pure Boy" (ちょっとイカしたPure Boy)
3. "Do It! Now (Instrumental)"

== Members at time of single ==
- 1st generation: Kaori Iida, Natsumi Abe
- 2nd generation: Kei Yasuda, Mari Yaguchi
- 3rd generation: Maki Goto (last single)
- 4th generation: Rika Ishikawa, Hitomi Yoshizawa, Nozomi Tsuji, Ai Kago
- 5th generation: Ai Takahashi, Asami Konno, Makoto Ogawa, Risa Niigaki
