= 4th Ikimasshoi! =

Studio album by Morning Musume
- Released: March 27, 2002
- Recorded: 2001–2002
- Genres: J-pop; pop rock; electronic dance
- Length: 1:01:35
- Label: Zetima
- Producer: Tsunku

Morning Musume chronology
Best! Morning Musume 1 (2001)	4th Ikimasshoi! (2002)	No. 5 (2003)

Singles from 4th Ikimasshoi!
- 1. "Ren'ai Revolution 21" Released: December 13, 2000; 2. "The Peace!" Released: July 25, 2001; 3. "Mr. Moonlight (Ai no Big Band)" Released: October 31, 2001; 4. "Sōda! We're Alive" Released: February 20, 2002

4th Ikimasshoi! (4th 「いきまっしょい!」, 4th "Let's go!") is the fourth studio album from the J-pop idol group Morning Musume and was released on March 27, 2002.

== Release ==
The song "The Peace!" (ザ☆ピ〜ス！, Za Pīsu!) was released July 25, 2001. It sold a total of 682,320 copies and reached number one on the Oricon Charts. British newspaper The Guardian described the promotional video echoed the song's "strangeness" by placing the group in the middle of what appeared to be a gigantic public bathroom, displaying the girls dancing amongst the urinals and posing for photographs in the stalls; supposedly as a response to hidden camera footage of the members that had recently surfaced, filmed from a toilet in their production offices. This song is also a personal favorite of ex-Morning Musume member, Rika Ishikawa, as the monologue spoken by her towards the end of the song became one of her favorite moments of being in Morning Musume. The single version (later preserved on the Best! Morning Musume 2 anthology) contains a fade-out, suggesting to the listener that the song's multiple false endings continued infinitely. The version heard on the album 4th Ikimashoi! is billed as the "Complete Version" and does not fade out, instead coming to a stop several seconds beyond the single version's fadeout.

Single cover for “Mr. Moonlight (Ai No Big Band)”.

The next single, "Mr. Moonlight (Ai no Big Band)" (Mr.Moonlight ～愛のビッグバンド～, Misutā Mūnraito Ai no Biggu Bando; Mr. Moonlight (Love's Big Band)), was released October 31, 2001. It sold a total of 513,340 copies and reached number one on the Oricon Charts. This single also marked the debut of the fifth generation members Ai Takahashi, Risa Niigaki, Makoto Ogawa, and Asami Konno. The song exhibits heavy swing-style music influence, and the video featured the group dressed in outfits reminiscent of swing's peak era. Lead vocals are Hitomi Yoshizawa, Maki Goto, and Natsumi Abe. Inspiration for the cross-dressing costumes, theatrical style, and trademark staircase dancing appears to have been taken from Japan's Takarazuka Revue, an all-female musical theater troupe famous for its gender-bending performances. In 2002, an English-language cover ("Mr. Moonlight") was recorded by Elisa Fiorillo for the album Cover Morning Musume Hello! Project!.

== Overview ==
It is currently their second highest selling album, with a total of 515,400 copies sold. Since their last album (with new material) 3rd: Love Paradise, two more generations of members had joined, which might have contributed to the album's overall success. The album contained such popular singles as "The Peace!" and "Ren'ai Revolution 21." The first pressing edition of the album came in special packaging, with a B3-sized folded poster.

This album has received a platinum award for 250,000 copies sold.

== Track listing ==
No.	Title	Length
1.	"The Peace! (ザ☆ピ～ス)" (Complete Version)	5:27
2.	"Ii Koto Aru Kinen no Shunkan (いいことある記念の瞬間, The Moment I Remember When Something Good Happened)"	4:14
3.	"Mr. Moonlight (Ai no Big Band) (Mr.Moonlight ～愛のビッグバンド～, Mr. Moonlight: Love's Big Band)" (Long Version)	7:01
4.	"Hajimete no Rock Concert (初めてのロックコンサート, My First Rock Concert)"	4:35
5.	"Otoko Tomodachi (男友達, Guy Friend)"	4:03
6.	"Sōda! We're Alive (そうだ！We’re Alive, That's Right! We're Alive)"	4:57
7.	"Dekkai Uchuu ni Ai ga Aru (でっかい宇宙に愛がある, There's Love in this Great Big World)" (Album Version)	5:03
8.	"Ikimasshoi! (いきまっしょい!, Let's Go!)"	4:07
9.	"Densha no Futari (電車の二人, Train for Two People)"	3:20
10.	"Honki de Atsui Theme Song (本気で熱いテーマソング, The Seriously Passionate Theme Song)"	5:21
11.	"Suki na Senpai (好きな先輩, My Senior Crush)"	3:19
12.	"Ren'ai Revolution 21 (恋愛レボリューション21, Love Revolution 21)" (13-nin Version)	4:53
13.	"Nanni mo Iwazu ni I Love You (なんにも言わずにI Love You, Without Saying a Word, I Love You)"	5:15

== Members at the time of Album ==
- 1st generation: Kaori Iida, Natsumi Abe
- 2nd generation: Kei Yasuda, Mari Yaguchi
- 3rd generation: Maki Goto
- 4th generation: Rika Ishikawa, Hitomi Yoshizawa, Nozomi Tsuji, Ai Kago
- 5th generation: Ai Takahashi, Asami Konno, Makoto Ogawa, Risa Niigaki
