= Morning Musume =

Japanese girl group

Morning Musume モーニング娘。
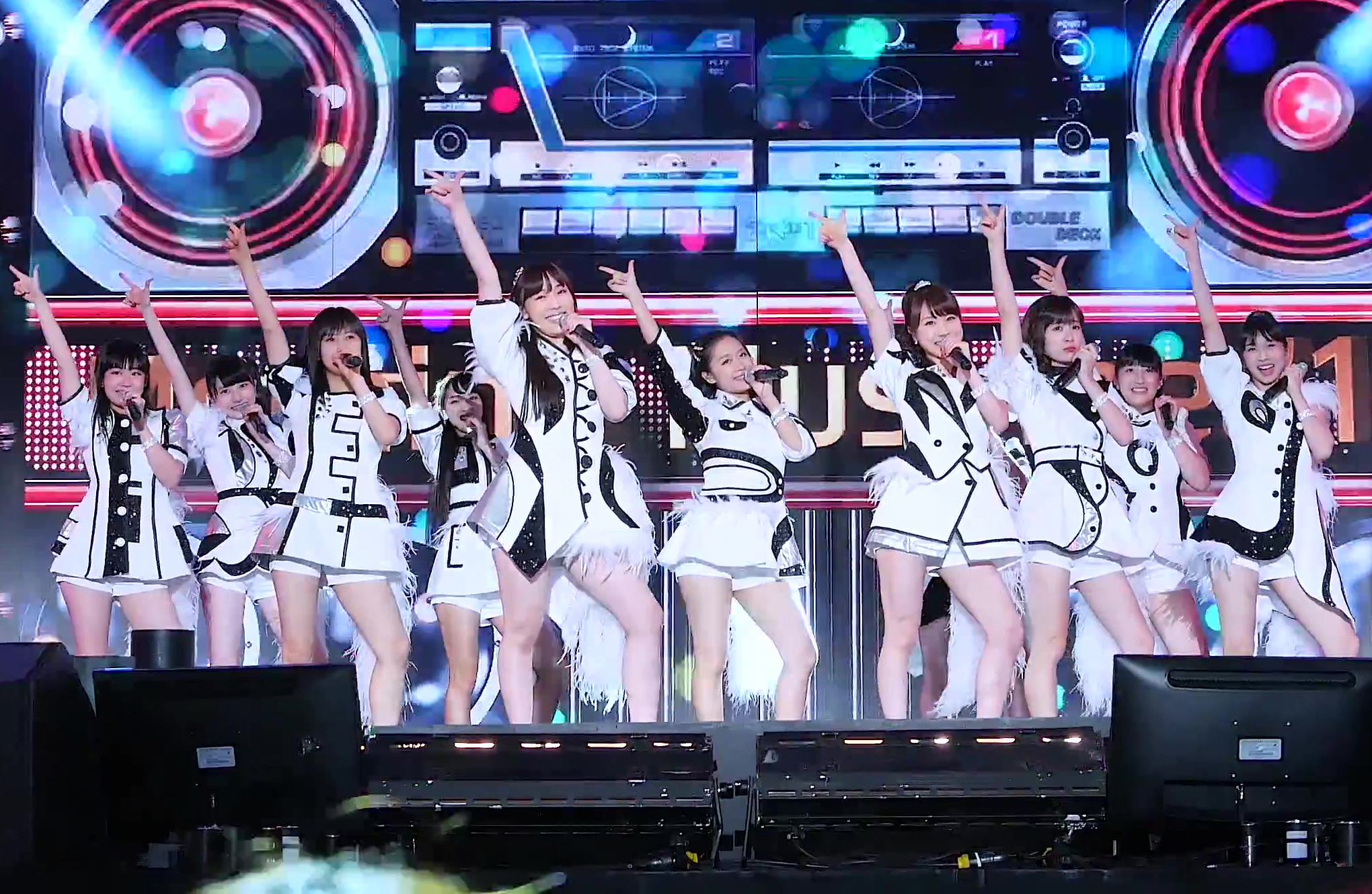
- Morning Musume in 2016

Background information
- Also known as: Momusu 早安少女組。
- Origin: Tokyo, Japan
- Genre: J-pop
- Years active: 1997–present
- Label: Zetima
- Spinoffs: Tanpopo; Petit Moni; Mini-Moni; Morning Musume Sakuragumi; Morning Musume Otomegumi; Morning Musume Tanjō 10nen Kinentai; W; Ecomoni; Dream Morning Musume
- Members: Sakura Oda; Miki Nonaka; Homare Okamura; Mei Yamazaki; Rio Sakurai; Haruka Inoue; Ako Yumigeta; Meisa Sugihara; Miyu Yasuda; Moa Suzuki; Hanano Ishikawa
- Past members: See List of Morning Musume members
- Website: www.helloproject.com/morningmusume

Morning Musume '26 (モーニング娘。 '26, Mōningu Musume Two-Six.; lit. "Morning Girls" or "Morning Daughters"), formerly and commonly known as Morning Musume (モーニング娘。, Mōningu Musume.), is a Japanese girl group associated with Up-Front Promotion. The group was produced by singer-songwriter and record producer Tsunku, who composed the majority of their songs until 2014. Since their formation, the group has seen changes in their membership, with the current members of the group consisting of Sakura Oda, Miki Nonaka, Homare Okamura, Mei Yamazaki, Rio Sakurai, Haruka Inoue, Ako Yumigeta, Meisa Sugihara, Miyu Yasuda, Moa Suzuki, and Hanano Ishikawa.

After the release of their indies single, "Ai no Tane", in 1997, Morning Musume made their official debut in 1998 with the single "Morning Coffee." Their highest-selling single, "Love Machine" (1999), was the first single to reach no. 1 on the Oricon Weekly Singles Chart and sold over 1 million copies upon release. In 2012, the group held the second highest overall single sales of a female group on the Oricon Weekly Singles Chart, with the Oricon record of most top-ten singles, having 64 of them.

Morning Musume is credited with the revival of the idol industry in Japan in the late 1990s. Morning Musume has been the flagship group of the musical collective Hello! Project, becoming the basis of other groups under the collective, such as Country Musume, Coconuts Musume, and Ice Creamusume. In addition, Morning Musume has spun off with multiple successful sub-units, such as Tanpopo, Petit Moni, Mini-Moni, Morning Musume Sakuragumi, Morning Musume Otomegumi, Morning Musume Tanjō 10nen Kinentai, Ecomoni, and Dream Morning Musume.

== History ==
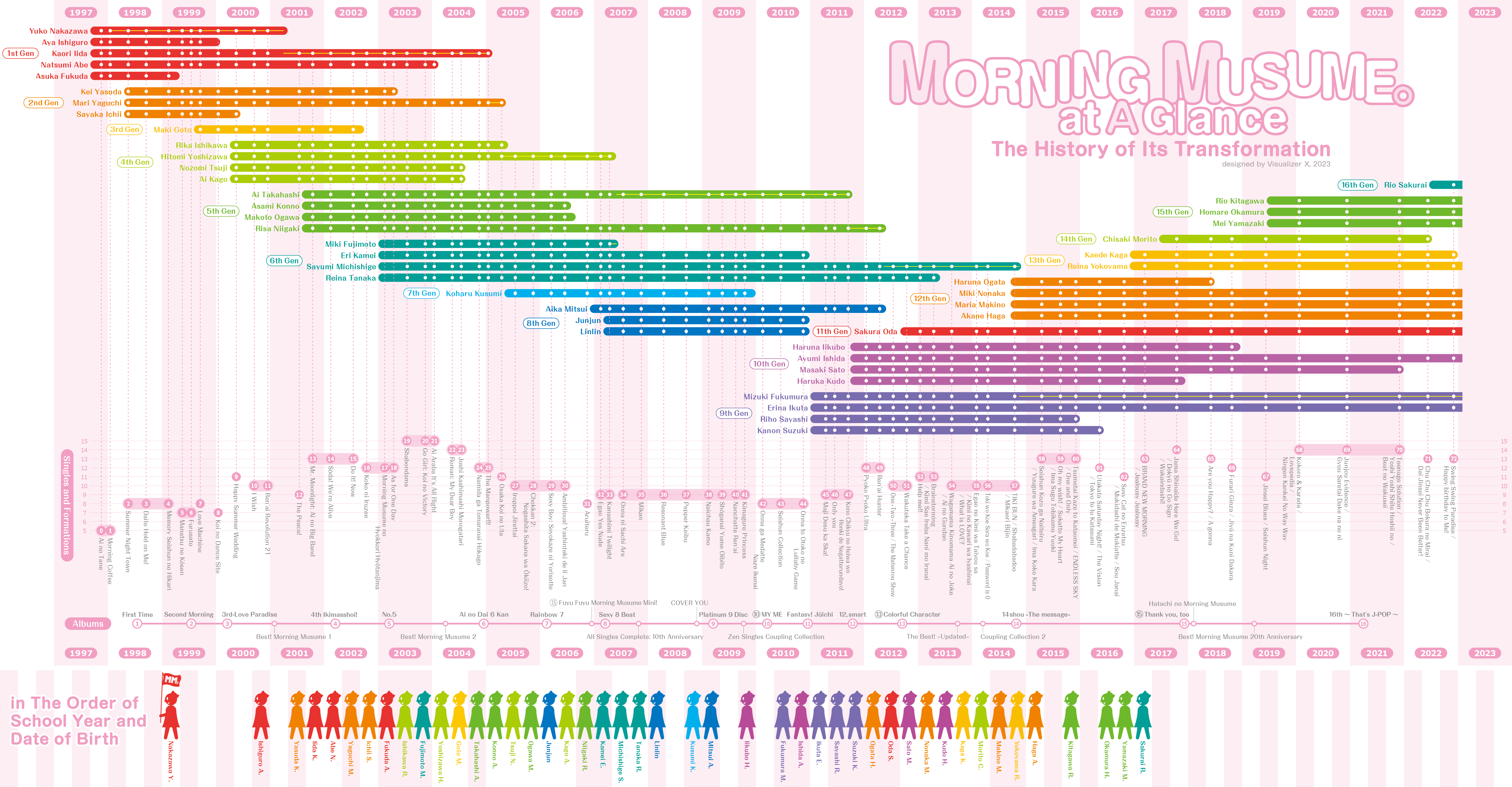
Transition of the members and its discography

=== 1997–1998: Formation and beginnings ===
In 1997, the reality competition television program Asayan held an audition to cast a female vocalist for Tsunku's band, Sharam Q. While Michiyo Heike won the competition, Tsunku decided to form a girl group with the five runner-ups: Natsumi Abe, Yuko Nakazawa, Kaori Iida, Asuka Fukuda, and Aya Ishiguro. They were issued a challenge to sell 50,000 copies of their demo single, "Ai no Tane", with just five days of promotion events. They managed the feat in four promotion days.

In early 1998, Morning Musume debuted with their first single, "Morning Coffee". The success of this single (hitting number six on the Japanese pop charts) brought them three new members known as the second generation: Kei Yasuda, Mari Yaguchi, and Sayaka Ichii, bringing the total member count to eight. The second single, "Summer Night Town", was the first single of the new lineup—a mature pop tune about unsuccessfully attempting to hide one's true feelings. Their third single, "Daite Hold on Me!", continued in the same vein musically as Summer Night Town, and managed to hit number one on the charts.

"First Time" was released in July 1998, featuring the singles "Ai no Tane", "Morning Coffee" and "Summer Night Town".

That year, Tsunku also formed Tanpopo, the first subgroup of Morning Musume, with Kaori Iida, Aya Ishiguro, and Mari Yaguchi. Tanpopo touted slower, more mature songs.

When "Morning Coffee" was released, however, Morning Musume's label Zetima went by a different name, One Up Music (One Up is a combination of Warner Music Japan (the label that distributed One Up Music's catalog) and Up-Front Group (One Up Music's parent company)). However, in April 1998, one month before the release of "Summer Night Town", One Up Music ended its distribution deal with Warner, and was rebranded as Zetima when it merged with Y.J. Sounds (another former Up-Front Group-affiliated label). Distribution rights would be given to Sony Music Japan's sub label Epic Records for "Summer Night Town", "First Time", and all of Zetima's subsequent releases.

=== 1999-2000: "Love Machine", 3rd and 4th generations ===
The group released its fourth single "Memory Seishun no Hikari" in early 1999, reaching number two on Oricon, second to Glay's "Winter, Again" which had first week sales of 955,780 copies. The song features rap passages by L The Headtoucha. Asuka Fukuda then left the group to focus on her studies.

"Manatsu no Kōsen" was released in May and went to number three on the charts. Their sixth single, "Furusato", was released in July. Second Morning was released in July 1999, and contained the singles "Daite Hold on Me!", "Memory Seishun no Hikari", "Manatsu no Kōsen", and "Furusato". "Daite Hold on Me!" and "Manatsu no Kōsen" were remixed.

Tsunku held auditions for the third generation of Morning Musume, and Maki Goto was added. The group's seventh single, "Love Machine", sold 1,760,000 copies, making it a major hit. Goto was paired with Kei Yasuda and Sayaka Ichii to form Morning Musume's first sub-group Petit Moni, releasing their first single, "Chokotto Love" to over 1,123,610 copies.

"Koi no Dance Site" was released in early 2000, reaching number two and selling over a million copies. The single sold 600,860 copies. Aya Ishiguro left the group before the single was released in order to marry Shinya, drummer of visual kei rock band Luna Sea, leaving the group with seven members. In March, their third studio album, 3rd: Love Paradise was released. It sold more than 800,000 copies, making it Morning Musume's highest-selling studio album to date.

Morning Musume then introduced their fourth generation members, consisting of Rika Ishikawa, Hitomi Yoshizawa, Nozomi Tsuji, and Ai Kago. Their first single, "Happy Summer Wedding", reached no. 1 on Oricon and sold 1,370,000 copies. Afterwards, Sayaka Ichii left to pursue her own music career. "I Wish" and "Renai Revolution 21". Morning Musume also began performing in musicals each year, with their musical Love Century: Yume wa Minakerya Hajimaranai.

=== 2001-2002: 5th Generation and Maki Goto's departure ===
In April 2001, group leader Yuko Nakazawa left to focus on her solo career and because of her age, making Kaori Iida and Kei Yasuda Morning Musume's co-leaders. In July 2001, Morning Musume released the single "The Peace!". At the end of January 2001, they released their first compilation album, Best! Morning Musume 1. It sold 2,259,510 copies. It featured 15 tracks, the only original song being "Say Yeah! (Motto Miracle Night)".

At the end of 2001, four new members joined the group as the fifth generation through the audition "Love Audition 21:" Ai Takahashi, Asami Konno, Makoto Ogawa, and Risa Niigaki. Following this, Morning Musume released "Mr. Moonlight: Ai no Big Band". In February, "Sōda! We're Alive", was released. In July 2002, "Do It! Now" was released.

Morning Musume's fourth studio album, 4th Ikimasshoi! was released in March 2002. Late 2002 was marked by the graduation of Maki Goto. In October "Koko ni Iruzee!" was released. It was number one on Oricon.

=== 2003-2004: 6th generation, Sakuragumi, and Otomegumi ===
"Morning Musume no Hyokkori Hyōtanjima" was released in February 2003 as the group's seventeenth single. In April, they released "As for One Day", which sold 129,893 copies and hit number one in Oricon charts.

Before the auditions for the sixth generation were held, the group released the album No. 5. Kei Yasuda and Natsume Abe then announced that they were leaving the group. In mid-2003, four new members were added as the sixth generation: Eri Kamei, Sayumi Michishige, and Reina Tanaka, who passed through Morning Musume's auditions, and Miki Fujimoto, who had been a soloist within Hello! Project. The sixth generation's first single was "Shabondama", Mari Yaguchi became Morning Musume's sub-leader after Yasuda's departure.

Later in 2003, Morning Musume was split into two subgroups so that it could tour more cities and fit smaller venues: Morning Musume Sakuragumi, included Natsumi Abe, Mari Yaguchi, Hitomi Yoshizawa, Ai Kago, Ai Takahashi, Risa Niigaki, Asami Konno and Eri Kamei;and Morning Musume Otomegumi, featured Kaori Iida, Rika Ishikawa, Nozomi Tsuji, Makoto Ogawa, Miki Fujimoto, Sayumi Michishige, and Reina Tanaka. After regrouping, Morning Musume released the single "Go Girl: Koi no Victory".

In January 2004, Natsumi Abe left to pursue a solo career. Her last single was "Ai Araba It's All Right", The group soon released another single, "Roman: My Dear Boy". The song showcased an almost rock flavor and centered its lyrics around offering "a dance" to a boy. This was followed by their twenty-third single, "Joshi Kashimashi Monogatari",. Nozomi Tsuji and Ai Kago in left in August 2004 to focus on "W", their new duo group. In mid-2004, Morning Musume's second compilation album, Best! Morning Musume 2 was released and featured "Yah! Aishitai" as the only new track.

In November 2004, Morning Musume released "Namida ga Tomaranai Hōkago". Following this single Morning Musume Early Single Box was released. At the end of 2004, Morning Musume released their sixth studio album, named Ai no Dai 6 Kan

=== 2005-2006: 7th generation ===
On January 30, 2005, then-leader and the last member from the first generation Kaori Iida left to pursue a solo career, with Mari Yaguchi taking on leadership role with Hitomi Yoshizawa as subleader. Her last single was "The Manpower!!!", The beginning of 2005 also saw the beginning of Musume Document 2005, which covered behind-the-scenes material, historical footage, and interviews.

The "Lucky 7 Auditions" for the group's 7th generation members were held in various Japan cities in late 2004, resulting in six finalists. However, on January 9, 2005, Tsunku surprised everyone by announcing that no one in the Lucky 7 audition would be added to Morning Musume, citing that he had set his expectations extra-high this year in hopes of finding an "ace". In February 2005, Tsunku started another audition for Morning Musume's seventh generation. This audition resulted with Koharu Kusumi finally being chosen as the sole "miracle" member of the seventh generation.

On April 27, 2005, the group's twenty-sixth single, "Osaka Koi no Uta" was released. Prior to its release, Yaguchi announced on April 14, 2005, that she would retire from Morning Musume following a dating scandal. Sub-leader Hitomi Yoshizawa took over as the leader of Morning Musume, and Miki Fujimoto became sub-leader as of July 15, 2005.

Kusumi's first single with Morning Musume was July's "Iroppoi Jirettai", A 3 city handshake event was organized for the promotion of this single. Morning Musume's last single of 2005 was "Chokkan 2: Nogashita Sakana wa Ōkiizo!", which was a remake of a previous album-only song.

On December 31, 2005, former Morning Musume members Mari Yaguchi, Kaori Iida, Natsumi Abe, Yuko Nakazawa, Ai Kago, Nozomi Tsuji, Rika Ishikawa, Maki Goto, and Kei Yasuda joined the current lineup of Morning Musume to perform the group's signature hit "Love Machine" on the 2005/2006 edition of Kōhaku Uta Gassen.

On January 16, 2006, it was announced that Morning Musume had won a Kanagawa Image Up Award in recognition of Hello! Project's support of an anti-pollution campaign. Yoshizawa, Fujimoto, and Takahashi represented the group to accept the award.

In February, the group released their seventh studio album, Rainbow 7. In March 2006, "Sexy Boy: Soyokaze ni Yorisotte" was released.

On April 28, 2006, it was announced by Tsunku from his official website that fifth-generation members Asami Konno and Makoto Ogawa would be leaving the group. Konno graduated on July 23, 2006, to attend university and Ogawa left on August 27, 2006, to study English abroad. Their last single with the group "Ambitious! Yashinteki de Ii Jan". A limited-edition CD of all past 30 singles mixed into a thirteen-minute track was included on the first pressing.

In mid-2006, the group performed the musical Princess Knight. Ai Takahashi took the main role; the secondary role was played by alternating members. There was also a mini-concert at the end of each performance, which served as Ogawa's real "leaving concert"—the Wonderful Hearts 2006 concert was initially intended for Konno's departure only, although Ogawa wore a special outfit and read her leaving comments as well. As for Ribbon no Kishi, an album with a selection of songs was released: Ribbon no Kishi The Musical Song Selection.

In mid-2006, Tsunku announced the audition for the eighth generation, called Morning Musume Happy 8 Audition. The audition started on August 27, 2006, and ended in Tokyo on October 22, 2006. On December 10, 2006, it was announced through Hello! Morning that the only new member was Aika Mitsui. The last single release in 2006 was "Aruiteru". The song's lyrics were credited for its success, with lines like "walking, you're not alone because everyone's here with you, praying for peace".

Their first extended play, 7.5 Fuyu Fuyu Morning Musume Mini!, was released in December.

=== 2007: 8th generation and expansion across Asia ===
In early 2007, Morning Musume Tanjō 10nen Kinentai, a unit consisting of Kaori Iida, Natsumi Abe, Maki Goto, Risa Niigaki, and Koharu Kusumi, was created to celebrate the 10th anniversary of Morning Musume. They released a commemorative single called "Bokura ga Ikiru My Asia".

On January 2, 2007, an announcement was made during Hello! Project's 2007 Winter concert that the group's leader at the time Hitomi Yoshizawa would leave Morning Musume on May 6, 2007, the last day of Morning Musume's 2007 spring tour. The concert would take place at the Saitama Super Arena in Yoshizawa's hometown.In February, the first single with the eighth generation member Aika Mitsui was released, "Egao Yes Nude".

On March 11, 2007, producer Tsunku revealed on Hello! Morning he would make an important announcement in the following episode. Several days later, on March 15, he announced that Li Chun and Qian Lin, both Chinese nationals, were to join as "exchange students" and 8th generation members. Tsunku stated the two new members would be an important key for their group's planned expansion into Asia and gave them the stage names "Jun Jun" and "Lin Lin" respectively. The two made their stage debut on May 6, at Saitama Super Arena. They were the first non-Japanese members of the group. On March 21, 2007, the group's eighth studio album, Sexy 8 Beat, was released.

On April 25, 2007, Morning Musume released their 33rd single, "Kanashimi Twilight". With the success of "Kanashimi Twilight", on May 1, 2007, Morning Musume became the "best single selling female group in Japan" with 11,085,000 copies sold—their fifth Oricon record. The achievement surpasses the previous record set by Pink Lady of 11,037,000 copies sold.

On May 6, 2007, Hitomi Yoshizawa left. Miki Fujimoto took her place as leader and Ai Takahashi replaced Fujimoto as sub-leader. As of June 1, 2007, Miki Fujimoto resigned from Morning Musume, due to the tabloid magazine Friday running an article depicting Fujimoto and comedian Tomoharu Shoji in a relationship. Ai Takahashi replaced Fujimoto as leader, and Risa Niigaki became subleader.

Morning Musume's 34th single, "Onna ni Sachi Are", reached number two on the Oricon Weekly Singles Chart, with sales of 43,364 copies. On October 26, 2007, Ai Takahashi, Risa Niigaki, and Koharu Kusumi visited Korea to promote their singles collection album Morning Musume All Singles Complete: 10th Anniversary, which was released on October 24, 2007. Also, Takahashi and Niigaki appeared as special guests in a Korean radio show called Maybee's Turn Up the Volume (메이비의 볼륨을 높여요). Later that same month, on October 29, 2007, all nine members traveled to Taiwan for three days to promote the album. During their visit, they attended press conferences, appeared for radio and TV show recordings, and held the first-ever public handshaking event outside Japan.

On November 21, 2007, marked the release of Morning Musume's 35th single, "Mikan". On December 31, 2007, Morning Musume performed in the 58th NHK Kōhaku Uta Gassen with a remixed version of their song "Love Machine" along with Cute and Berryz Kobo.

=== 2008–2010: Platinum Era ===
Ai Takahashi, Eri Kamei, Sayumi Michishige, and Reina Tanaka participated in the musical Ojigi 30 Degrees at the Shinjuku Theater from February 26 to March 2. Morning Musume's 36th music single, "Resonant Blue", had been announced for release on March 5, 2008, but was postponed until April 16, 2008. In its first week, it sold 48,086 copies. The management of Morning Musume revealed in an interview in March that they were going to take a new approach to promoting the group, pushing the individual members so that they could do more personal activities.

On April 5, 2008, Mitsui was diagnosed with acute appendicitis and subsequently missed the concerts on April 12 and 13. Morning Musume then held a concert at Taipei Nankang Exhibition Hall, Taiwan, on May 24, 2008, marking the first time they held a concert tour outside Japan. From August 6 to 25, 2008, Morning Musume starred in the musical Cinderella, with several members of the Takarazuka Revue n a version of Rodgers and Hammerstein's Cinderella. Ai Takahashi starred in the main role of Cinderella, with Risa Niigaki as the Prince, and Eri Kamei and Reina Tanaka as the stepsisters. The other members performed in minor roles as fairies and guards.

Morning Musume's 37th single, "Pepper Keibu", was released on September 24, 2008.

Haromoni@ finished their run and were replaced with Yorosen!, which began on October 6, 2008. The show starred Morning Musume, Berryz Kobo, and Cute.

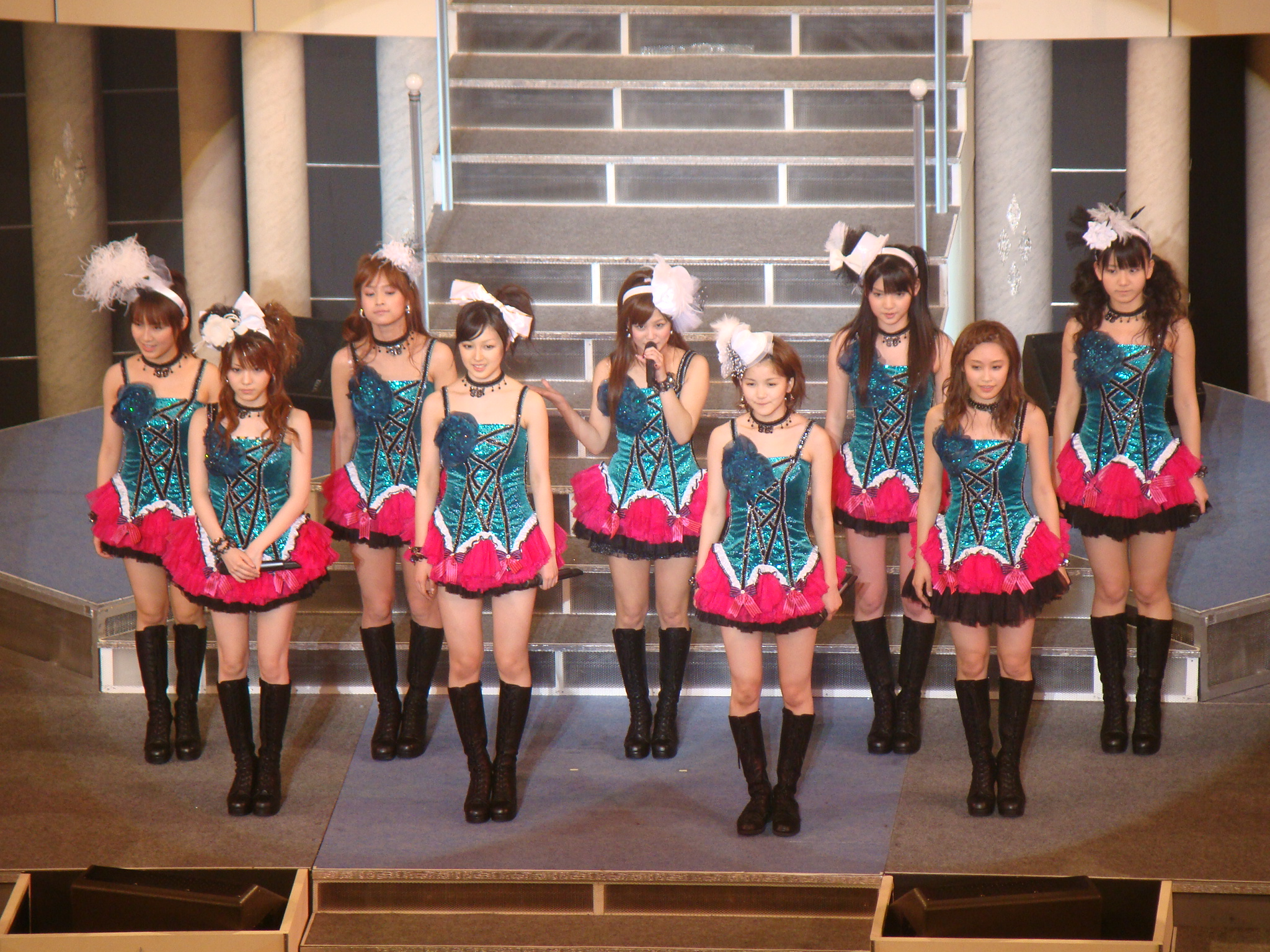
Platinum 9 Tour in spring 2009

Morning Musume released their 38th single, "Naichau Kamo" on February 18, 2009. It was released in two limited versions, A and B, each including a DVD. On March 18, 2009, they released their ninth studio album, called Platinum 9 Disc. Morning Musume released their 39th single, "Shōganai Yume Oibito", on May 13, 2009, attaining a rank of number one on the Oricon weekly chart for the first time since their "Aruiteru" single in late 2006. It also became the group's first number one single to feature eighth generation members Aika Mitsui, Jun Jun, and Lin Lin.

Following the success of "Shōganai Yume Oibito", the group released their 40th single, "Nanchatte Renai", on August 12. Because "Nanchatte Renai" was the group's 40th single, a commemorative edition was released along with the usual regular edition plus two limited editions. The commemorative edition has a different c/w track on it than the regular and limited editions. The group hadn't had two different c/ws since their 4th single, "Memory Seishun no Hikari" in 1999, which has two c/w tracks in one edition. The single came in at number two on the Oricon chart, only behind the new single of powerhouse Ayumi Hamasaki, Sunrise/Sunset (Love Is All). This single marked their best opening week since "Iroppoi Jirettai" in 2005.

Their latest Greatest Hits Album (B-side collection album) was released featuring all B-side songs from their debut single to 40th single on 3 discs.

Morning Musume released their 41st single, "Kimagure Princess", on October 28, 2009. There are four versions of the single (Regular, Limited A, B, and C). This marked the first time a Morning Musume single released a C version. The C version contained 10 interchangeable covers, much like 30th single "Ambitious! Yashinteki de Ii Jan", which came with 10 different covers.

The announcement was made that 7th Generation member Koharu Kusumi would leave Morning Musume and Hello! Project on December 6, after the first performance of Morning Musume's Fall Concert Tour 2009 Nine Smile, in order to pursue a modelling career.

Morning Musume released their 42nd single, "Onna ga Medatte Naze Ikenai", on February 10, 2010 It was released in four versions: Regular, and Limited A, B, and C. Their tenth album, 10 My Me, was released on March 17. Their forty-third single, "Seishun Collection", was released on June 9.

On August 8, producer Tsunku announced at that day's concert, and later on his blog, that Kamei, Jun Ju, and Lin Lin would be leaving Morning Musume at the end of the autumn tour, and that the ninth-generation audition would be held later in the year. Kamei stated that the reason for her leaving was to spend more time on the treatment of her atopic dermatitis, a chronic form of eczema, while Jun Jun and Lin Lin left to pursue careers in China, particularly after Morning Musume failed to break into the country.

Morning Musume's 44th single, "Onna to Otoko no Lullaby Game", was released on November 24, and Morning Musume's eleventh studio album, Fantasy! Jūichi, was released on December 1. On December 15, the last day of the autumn tour, Eri Kamei, Jun Jun and Lin Lin left Morning Musume and Hello! Project.

=== 2011: Revival and 9th and 10th Generation debuts ===
The three audition winners, Riho Sayashi, Kanon Suzuki and Erina Ikuta, were announced on stage by Tsunku at the Hello! Project 2011 Winter: Kangei Shinsen Matsuri concert on January 2, 2011. He then announced that Mizuki Fukumura, a Hello! Pro Egg, would also be joining Morning Musume.

On January 9, also at the Winter concert, it was announced that leader Ai Takahashi would be leaving Morning Musume and Hello! Project at the group's Autumn 2011 concert. The decision came after Tsunku suggested that Takahashi should consider leaving soon. After Takahashi's departure, Risa Niigaki took over her role as leader without a subleader.

On February 3, 2011, Morning Musume's 45th single, "Maji Desu ka Ska!", was announced. The single was set to be released on March 23, 2011; however, due to the earthquake and tsunami in Japan, the single was postponed until April 6. The new single reached number 5 on the Oricon weekly charts.

Morning Musume 46th single, "Only You", was released on June 15, 2011. There were five versions to the single: Regular, Limited A, Limited B, Limited C, and Limited D. The single reached number 4 on the Oricon Weekly charts.

On April 13, Morning Musume launched a weekly 1-hour Ustream show called UstreaMusume. On their official website, there is an e-mail provided, so fans can submit questions, messages and requests.

It was announced May 8 that 10th Generation Audition "Genkijirushi" submissions were starting until June 13.

During the summer, Morning Musume did a Fanclub Tour in Hawaii from July 20–26.

On September 14, Morning Musume released their 47th single. This was the leader Ai Takahashi's last single with Morning Musume after a tenure of 10 years with the group. In order to celebrate Ai Takahashi's long career with Morning Musume, their 47th single was released as a double A sides. There were five versions of the single: Regular, Limited A, Limited B, Limited C and Limited D. The single names were as follows: "Kono Chikyū no Heiwa o Honki de Negatterun Da yo! / Kare to Issho ni Omise ga Shitai!" as the double A side and Takahashi's solo song was revealed as "Jishin Motte Yume o Motte Tobitatsu Kara". The 47th single reached number 2 on the Oricon daily and weekly charts.

On September 29, the penultimate day of the fall tour and the day before Ai Takahashi's departure, Tsunku announced the four winners of the tenth-generation audition, Haruna Iikubo, Ayumi Ishida, Masaki Sato, and Haruka Kudo from Hello! Pro Egg. On September 30, Takahashi left, handing over her position as leader of Morning Musume and Hello! Project to Risa Niigaki.

=== 2012–2014: Colorful era ===
It was announced on January 2 that new leader Risa Niigaki would leave Morning Musume and Hello! Project on the last day of their spring concert tour, May 18, at the Nippon Budokan. The tour started on February 19.

Morning Musume's 49th single, "Renai Hunter", was released on April 11, 2012. This was Risa Niigaki's last single in Morning Musume and it came in Limited A, B, C, and D editions and also had a solo cover song by Risa called Egao Ni Namida, originally sung by Matsuura Aya. It was also the last single to feature Aika Mitsui.

On May 4, Aika Mitsui announced that she would leave Morning Musume, due to an unhealed stress fracture in her left foot. She left along with Niigaki at Nippon Budokan on May 18. Sayumi Michishige was declared as the new leader at the concert, along with the announcement of the 11th generation 'Suppin Utahime' audition.

On July 4, Morning Musume's 50th single, "One Two Three / The Matenrou Show" was released, and sold 56,139 copies on its first day, charting at number 2. These first-day sales surpassed the first week sales of all Morning Musume singles since 'Iroppoi Jirettai' in 2005. The single came in seven different editions: Regular, Limited A and Limited B (featuring sixth-generation), Limited C and D (featuring ninth-generation) and Limited E and Limited F (featuring tenth-generation). The Limited A, B, C, D, E and F had tracks featuring the respective generations. "One Two Three/The Matenrou Show" placed at number 3 weekly, selling over 100,000 copies in its first week.

Morning Musume's 13th album, 13 Colorful Character, was released on September 12.

On September 14, 2012, at Morning Musume's 15th Anniversary Concert Tour Rehearsal, Hello! Project producer Tsunku, announced the winner of the 'Morning Musume 11th Generation Suppin Utahime Auditions'. Sakura Oda was chosen out of 7,000 applicants and was the only one out of the six finalists to be chosen making her the third sole generation of Morning Musume, previously being Maki Goto (third-generation) and Koharu Kusumi (seventh-generation).

Morning Musume's 52nd single would be called "Help me!!" was released on January 23, 2013, and was the first single to feature eleventh-generation member Sakura Oda. It was Morning Musume's first single since "Shouganai Yume Oibito" in 2009 to achieve the weekly number 1 spot on the Oricon charts. On February 28, a loose shot version of a new song titled "Brainstorming" was posted onto YouTube, a few days later a dance shot version of another new song titled "Kimi Sae Ireba Nani mo Iranai" was also posted. It was then confirmed that both tracks would be released as a double A-side single on April 17.

On March 16, Tsunku announced the twelfth-generation audition, called 'Morning Musume Mirai Shoujo audition'. On August 4, he announced that no one had passed the audition. He stated that this was partly due to the level of talent being lower than necessary, and partly due to the recent success of the current line-up. All audition finalists were accepted into the Hello!Project Kenshuusei program.

On May 21, Reina Tanaka graduated from Morning Musume after the final live of the “Morning Musume Concert Tour 2013"

Starting on January 1, 2014, Morning Musume began using a year-based naming format, changing their artist name from "Morning Musume" to "Morning Musume '14." The change was announced by Tsunku, who explained that the year designation was intended to help fans more easily identify the era of specific singles or member lineups. He stated the goal was to support the group's continuity for decades to come. The name has been updated annually on January 1 to reflect the current year.

On January 29, Morning Musume '14 released their 55th single, "Egao no Kimi wa Taiyō sa / Kimi no Kawari wa Iyashinai / What is Love?". "Kimi no Kawari wa Iyashinai" served as the official support song for Japan's team at the 2014 Winter Olympics and was performed live at the national team's send-off event for the Japanese national team on January 20. The single debuted at number one on the Oricon charts with 149,000 copies sold, becoming the group's 15th single to reach the top position. It also marked the first time since their debut in January 1998 that the group achieved four consecutive number-one singles. This streak continued with their 56th single, "Toki o Koe Sora o Koe / Password is 0", released on April 16, which also debuted at number one with 119,000 copies sold. However, the run ended with the 57th single, "Tiki Bun / Shabadaba Dū / Mikaeri Bijin", released on October 15, after peaking at number two despite selling 135,000 copies in its first week.

The 57th single was the last to feature sixth-generation member Sayumi Michishige, who graduated on November 26 at Yokohama Arena during the group's autumn tour, Give Me More Love: Sayumi Michishige Graduation Memorial Special. Michishige was the final member to have overlapped with the group's Golden Era, having debuted in 2003 and performed alongside its most publicly recognized lineup. Her graduation not only concluded a 12-year tenure—the longest at the time—but also symbolized a generational transition. Leadership transitioned to ninth-generation member Mizuki Fukumura. with Haruna Iikubo and Erina Ikuta appointed as co-subleaders.

The 12th generation members were officially revealed on September 30, consisting of Haruna Ogata, Miki Nonaka, Maria Makino, and Akane Haga. On Sunday, October 5, 2014, Morning Musume '14 made their first appearance at the Best Buy Theater in New York City, New York.

=== 2015–2016: Riho Sayashi and Kanon Suzuki's graduation and 13th Generation ===
On January 1, 2015, Morning Musume '14 changed their name to Morning Musume '15. Announced on February 9, 2015, Morning Musume '15 performed the "Ima Koko Kara" (イマココカラ; From Here and Now) for the Pretty Cure All Stars: Spring Carnival movie that aired a month later. Haruna Iikubo, Ayumi Ishida, and Sakura Oda provide their voices in the movie for the role of a trio of spirits that they designed themselves. On February 14, 2015, it was announced that Haruna Iikubo would be the official mentor to the 12th generation, bringing back the mentor system.. On October 29, 2015, it was announced by UP-FRONT PROMOTION that Sayashi Riho will be graduated from Morning Musume '15 on December 31, 2015, during the countdown live, in order to focus on dancing. In October 2015, YouTube blocked UP-FRONT GROUP Co., Ltd.'s videos and related videos in many Western countries including the United States due to YouTube Red contract issues. (Up-Front Group is the holdings company involved in Hello Project and Morning Musume.) The issue was later resolved when Up-Front worked out a solution with YouTube.

Morning Musume '15 released their new single "Tsumetai Kaze to Katamoi / Endless SKy / One and Only" on December 29, 2015. It is a triple A-side single and was Riho's last single as a member of Morning Musume '15. "One and Only" was the first Morning Musume song to be sung completely in English.

On January 1, 2016, Morning Musume '15 was renamed Morning Musume '16. On January 2, Morning Musume '16 Shinseiki Audition was announced during the Hello! Project 2016 Winter ~Dancing! Singing! Exciting!~ concert, to look for the 13th Generation members. In March, Morning Musume had their first concert with the new name. On February 7, Kanon Suzuki announced she will graduate from Morning Musume '16 and Hello! Project at the end of the Morning Musume '16 Spring Concert Tour Haru ~Emotion in Motion~. On February 26 to 28, 2016, Morning Musume '16 were main guests at Anime Matsuri in Houston, Texas to celebrate the convention's 10th anniversary. Morning Musume '16 released their 61st single "Utakata Saturday Night! / The Vision / Tokyo to Iu Katasumi". It is Kanon Suzuki's last single as a member of Morning Musume. On May 31, Kanon Suzuki graduated at the end of the spring concert tour in Nippon Budokan. On May 31, it was announced that no one had passed the Shinseiki audition, but as announced on June 15, 2016, it was re-held. Morning Musume '16 was invited to perform during the TV Tokyo Music Festival(3) on June 29, and NTV's THE MUSIC DAY Natsu no Hajimari on July 2, TBS TV's Ongaki no Hi x CDTV Asamade Natsu Fes! 2016 on July 16 and Fuji TV's 2016 FNS Uta no Natsu Matsuri on July 18 with °C-ute and Angerme.

On November 23, Morning Musume '16 released their 62nd single, Sexy Cat no Enzetsu / Mukidashi de Mukiatte / Sou Janai. Morning Musume '16 appeared during the second night of Fuji TV's 2016 FNS Kayousai on December 14, performing in an "Idol Shuffle Medley" with other idol groups including °C-ute.

On November 23 at the Morning Musume '16 Concert Tour Aki "My Vision" concert in Osaka, the group announced that the 13th generation would be selected from Hello Pro Kenshuusei and announced at the Nippon Budokan tour finale on December 12. The audition administrator later released an official statement on the Hello! Project website explaining that the winner(s) would be chosen from Hello Pro Kenshuusei because, once again, no suitable candidates were found from the general audition. The 13th Generation members were officially revealed on December 12. They are two former Hello!Pro Kenshuusei members Kaede Kaga and Reina Yokoyama. The 13th Generation was the first in the group's history to have only two members.

On December 31, the group performed on TV for the first time as the Morning Musume '17 line-up during the CDTV Special! Toshikoshi Premier Live 2016→2017. The performance was pre-recorded on December 30, with Sato Masaki unable to participate due to her lower back injury.

=== 2017: 20th Anniversary celebrations, 14th Generation and Haruka Kudo's graduation ===
On January 1, 2017, Morning Musume '16 changed their name to Morning Musume '17. On January 6, Hello!Project announced that Sato Masaki would be on hiatus until further notice as she recovers from her back injury, classed as spinal disc herniation. On January 12, it was announced that Morning Musume '17 would collaborate with Marukome by singing a remake of "Morning Coffee" titled "Morning Misoshiru" to promote the company's new miso soup product of the same name. it was also announced that Haruka Kudo would be the official mentor to the 13th generation.

Morning Musume '17 formed a collaborative unit with HKT48 member Rino Sashihara named Sashining Musume. They sang the track "Get you!" released in Type-A of AKB48's 8th album Thumbnail (album) on January 25. This is the first AKB single to include Morning Musume, and the first collaboration in a single between the two groups. 'Get You!' would later be included in Morning Musume's 63rd single as a B-side.

On January 26 it was announced that Morning Musume '17 would release their 63rd single titled "Brand New Morning / Jealousy Jealousy" on March 8, 2017. This was the first single to feature the 13th generation members, and the first to not feature 10th generation member Sato Masaki in the A-side tracks while she was on hiatus due to her lower back injury. This single also marks the return of Double A-side's, last seen in their 56th single.

On February 24, Up Front announced that Sato Masaki will be returning from her three-month hiatus, and restart her activities in the group on March 18, where the group had a concert in Pacifico Yokohama during the "Morning Musume'17 Concert Tour Spring "The Inspiration" tour.

On March 25, it was announced that Morning Musume '17 and ANGERME would be featured in the game app titled Hello! Project Hina Fest "Idol Nama Gassen" "Kunitori Tenka Touitsu Hen", for which a "live battle" event was held on April 16.

On April 10, Morning Musume '17 was appointed the official Ouen Taishi, or Cheer Ambassadors, of the "Ceka Paka Play Dream Campaign" for the Nihon Seimei Ce-Pa Koryusen (the Nippon Professional Baseball interleague) that would begin on May 30. Fukumura Mizuki would be the leader of the whole campaign while the other 12 members would each support one of the 12 teams, and each member would have their own type of dance movie that would be shown at their team's home stadium. On April 29, during the daytime show of Morning Musume '17 Concert Tour Haru "The Inspiration!", 10th generation member Kudo Haruka made a sudden announcement that she will be graduating from Morning Musume '17 and Hello! Project at the end of their fall 2017 tour.

As part of their collaboration with marukome, Morning Musume '17 began airing a weekly 5-minute radio program titled marukome Morning Misoshiru Koeru yo! on July 1 across 38 stations.

On June 26, it was announced through a special episode of Hello! Project Station that Chisaki Morito has joined the group as a new 14th generation member and concurrent member from Country Girls, She began activities with the group in the Hello! Project 2017 SUMMER concert tour and in their upcoming fall tour.

On October 4, they released Morito Chisaki's debut single and Kudo Haruka's last, titled "Jama Shinai de Here We Go! / Dokyuu no Go Sign / Wakain da shi!".

=== 2018–2019: Haruna Ogata's and Haruna Iikubo's graduations and 15th Generation ===
On January 1, 2018, Morning Musume '17 changed their name to Morning Musume '18. On January 28, Morning Musume '18 released the digital single "Hana ga Saku Taiyou Abite".

From February 3 to March 4, the "Morning Musume museum -Morning Musume Tanjou 20 Shuunen Kinen-" was open at HMV and Books Hakata in Fukuoka. Afterwards, it was open from March 11 to April 15 at HMV Sendai in Miyagi. Created to celebrate the group's 20th anniversary, the museum contained all the group's releases as well as official costumes and merchandise sold throughout their 20-year career.

On February 12, TV Tokyo aired the Morning Musume 20 Shuunen Kinen Special starring 25 current and former members of Morning Musume: all thirteen Morning Musume '18 members and OG members Nakazawa Yuko, Iida Kaori, Ishiguro Aya, Abe Natsumi, Fukuda Asuka, Yaguchi Mari, Ishikawa Rika, Yoshizawa Hitomi, Tsuji Nozomi, Takahashi Ai, Niigaki Risa, and Michishige Sayumi. The show included a talk corner about group history, a look back at Hello! Morning, and several studio performances.

On March 14, the group attended a press conference to announce a collaboration between au and Hello! Project titled "Oto no VR", which will deliver 360° video and audio content for smartphones, starting with a video of Morning Musume '18 singing "I WISH". That following evening, Morning Musume '18 performed in the second part of the SKY PerfecTV! Ongakusai 2018 alongside Tsubaki Factory. On March 27, Hello! Project announced Haruna Ogata's graduation. She cited the reason for graduation being due to failing to pass her university entrance exams due to her focus being split between education and activities as a member of the group. On June 13, Morning Musume '18 released their 65th single and Ogata Haruna's last "Are you Happy? / A gonna". Exactly a week later, on June 20, Haruna Ogata graduated at Nippon Budokan, the last stop of their Spring 2018 tour.

After the end of their Spring 2018 tour, the group began to focus on performing at the mid year specials for various music shows. On June 27, Morning Musume '18 performed "Are you Happy?", their first performance without Ogata, on TV Tokyo Music Festival 2018. During the show, eight former Morning Musume members, Nakazawa Yuko, Ishiguro Aya, Iida Kaori, Asuka Fukuda, Yasuda Yasuda, Mari Yaguchi, Maki Goto, and Hitomi Yoshizawa, performed a special medley of their most iconic songs. This was Goto's first performance with the group in over 5 years. Morning Musume '18 also performed in TBS's Ongaku no Hi 2018 on July 14, and on July 25, had a special collaboration with Da Pump for the 2018 FNS Uta no Natsu Matsuri where they both performed Da Pump's famous song, "U.S.A" and a medley of Morning Musume's song "Are you happy?" and "The Peace.". On August 12, they performed at rockin'on presents ROCK IN JAPAN FES.2018 on the Lake Stage.

On August 17, 2018, Iikubo Haruna announced on her blog that she will graduate from both Morning Musume '18 and Hello! Project at the end of the fall tour Morning Musume '18 Concert Tour Aki "Get Set, Go!".

On September 14, the group celebrated their 21st anniversary. During the event they announced a collaboration with Caribadix, an anime short series produced by Sanrio and rockin'on about a group of animals who form a rock band. Morning Musume '18 would become cheer characters named "Gaokkii" who appear in each of the 12 members' colors with their symbolic motif. The characters are featured in goods sold at the Morning Musume '18 Concert Tour Aki ~GET SET, GO!~ and also in stores.

On October 24, Morning Musume '18 released their 66th single and Iikubo Haruna's last "Furari Ginza / Jiyū na Kuni Dakara". On December 12, they performed on the second night of Fuji TV's 2018 FNS Kayousai, marking Iikubo's final television appearance as a member of the group, and on December 16, Iikubo graduated at Nippon Budokan.

On November 10, 2018, Morning Musume '18 held their first concert in Mexico. A week later, on November 17, they performed in the Anisong World Matsuri at Anime NYC 2018 in New York City, which included a panel and autograph signing session the day before. To promote these two overseas appearances, a YouTube live stream was held on October 5 JST with the members answering fans' questions.

During the Hello! Project 20th Anniversary!! Hello! Project Countdown Party 2018 "Good Bye & Hello!" on December 31, 10th generation member Ishida Ayumi was appointed as a new sub-leader of the group alongside Ikuta Erina.

During the opening concert of the Hello! Project 20th Anniversary!! Hello! Project 2019 Winter tour on January 2, the Morning Musume '19 LOVE Audition in search of 15th generation member(s) to join the group was announced.

On March 13, they released the compilation album Best! Morning Musume 20th Anniversary. The album included all songs from the last 10 years, from Mikan in 2007 to their most recent single Furari Ginza. As the songs are unedited, all members who were active from the release of Mikan till present, can be heard in the album and appear on the covers of the album, although all the graduated members aren't credited.

On June 12, the group released their 67th single "Jinsei Blues / Seishun Night". During their release event at Ikebukuro Sunshine City Fountain Square, it was announced that the 15th generation would be revealed on June 22 at 5:00 PM JST in a YouTube live stream. This is the first time the group has revealed its members to the general public and members in this format. On June 22, the 15th generation were announced in a YouTube live stream on Morning Musume's official channel at 5:00 PM JST, The new members were revealed to be Rio Kitagawa, child actress and model Homare Okamura and former Hello! Pro Kenshuusei Hokkaido member Mei Yamazaki. They were introduced on stage during the Hello! Project 2019 Summer concert tour from July 13 and would begin performing with the group in the Morning Musume '19 Concert Tour Aki. With the 15th generation all being younger than Haga Akane, their arrival marks the end of Haga's run as the youngest serving member of the group at 5 years. As the 15th generation members got their official colors, 12th generation Makino Maria revealed that she had changed her Baby Pink color to Pink, which was previously Michishige's color, a member she looks up to. Haga Akane had also changed her color from Light Orange to Orange which was Kudo Haruka's color, whom Haga also looks up to.

On July 10, it was announced that Oda Sakura was diagnosed with cervical degenerative disc disease by the doctor after experiencing severe pain around her left shoulder blade the day before. Due to it requiring one month of treatment, Oda was absent from the Hello! Project 2019 Summer concert tour from July 13 to August 3, as well as a "Jinsei Blues / Seishun Night" release event on July 15.

On August 10, following the success of their performance on last years Lake Stage, Morning Musume '19 were once again invited to perform at rockin'on presents ROCK IN JAPAN FESTIVAL 2019 on the GRASS STAGE, the largest stage in the festival. The group's professionalism and high performance level was praised with many highlighting the group's ability to perform a 50-minute set with no breaks in the peak of hot weather in Japan. With a capacity of over 60,000 people, this was their largest audience to date. This was also Oda Sakura's first performance back with the group after her short medical leave.

=== 2022: Chisaki Morito's and Kaede Kaga's graduations and 16th Generation ===
On January 1, Morning Musume '21 changed their name to Morning Musume '22. On January 2, during the opening concert of the Hello! Project 2022 Winter "Love & Peace" tour, it was announced by Fukumura Mizuki that Morning Musume '22 and Juice=Juice would be holding a holding a joint new member audition titled Hello! Project "Morning Musume '22" "Juice=Juice" Goudou Shin Member Audition. The audition is open to applicants as of January 2, and the application period will end at 10pm (22:00) JST on February 9, 2021. Any girl living in Japan from 5th grade elementary school to 2nd year of high school are eligible to apply. A website of the audition was opened with more details.

On February 28, it was announced that Morito Chisaki is set to graduate from Morning Musume and Hello! Project on June 20 at the final concert of the Morning Musume '22 Concert Tour "Never Been Better!" at Nippon Budokan.

On June 29, it was announced on a special video of the Hello! Project Station that Rio Sakurai had passed the final round of the Hello! Project "Morning Musume '22" "Juice=Juice" Goudou Shin Member Audition, becoming a member of Morning Musume '22.

On September 3, it was announced that Kaga Kaede is set to graduate from Morning Musume and Hello! Project on December 10 at the final concert of the Morning Musume '22 25th Anniversary Concert Tour "Singin' To The Beat", so that she will be able to go and study dancing. On September 14, Morning Musume '22 announced their 25 Shuunen Kinen -Asu wo Tsukuru no wa Kimi- Audition during the Morning Musume '22 Kessei 25 Shunen Kinen FC Event "Musume × Fan×Fun! × Dai Kansha-sai!" concert. This was to look for a 17th generation.

On December 21, Morning Musume '22 released their 72nd single, Swing Swing Paradise / Happy birthday to Me!.

On December 27, it was announced that Mizuki Fukumura is set to graduate from Morning Musume and Hello! Project after their concert tour to be held on November 29, 2023.

=== 2023: Mizuki Fukumura's graduation and 17th Generation ===
On January 1, Morning Musume '22 changed their name to Morning Musume '23.

On March 23, it was announced that Morning Musume'23 (and other Hello! Project groups) would perform at the "Sayonara Nakano Sun Plaza Music Festival" on June 11. It will be held at the Nakano Sunplaza, which will be closed in July this year as a culmination of its 50-year history. On March 31, Morning Musume'23 appears on Space Shower TV in collaboration with Station ID and Tsuribu Tokyo (filmmakers), who help them celebrate their anniversary. With the title "Running through the Future", Tsuribu Tokyo, who produced and directed the video, wanted to express the figure that runs strongly through the currents of the time.

On April 30, Morning Musume'23 performed at Japan Jam 2023 in Chiba Soga Sports Park.

On May 17, it was announced that Morning Musume'23 would perform at rockin'on presents Rock in Japan FES 2023. On May 23, it was announced that Morning Musume 25 Shuunen Kinen Shin Member Audition -Asu wo Tsukuru no wa Kimi- winners Haruka Inoue and Ako Yumigeta has joined the group as the 17th generation.

On August 30, the group released their 9th best album Morning Musume Best Selection ~The 25 Shuunen~.

On October 25, Morning Musume'23 released their 73rd single, Suggoi FEVER! / Wake-up Call ~Mezameru Toki~ / Neverending Shine

On November 25, it was announced at the end of Morning Musume '23 Concert Tour Aki "Neverending Shine Show" that Erina Ikuta would become the new leader of both Morning Musume and Hello! Project, Sakura Oda would become the new sub-leader of the group and that Ayumi Ishida would remain sub-leader after Mizuki Fukumura's graduation.

On November 29, Mizuki Fukumura officially graduated from Morning Musume and Hello! Project at the Morning Musume '23 Concert Tour Aki "Neverending Shine Show ~Sanctuary~" Fukumura Mizuki Sotsugyou Special in Yokohama Arena.

=== 2024: Ayumi Ishida's graduation ===
On March 16, 2024, Morning Musume '24 launched their first solo tour, Motto Morning Musume, with the new lineup at J:COM Hall Hachioji in Tokyo. The tour included 31 shows across 13 cities and concluded on May 27 at Nippon Budokan. The final concert, attended by approximately 9,000 fans, was also streamed in cinemas nationwide and via Hulu. During the concert, the group gave the first live performance of their 74th single, "Nadaka Sentimental na Toki no Uta / Saikiyou", and announced its official release for August 14. The event featured the first live performance of "Saikiyou". Sub-leader Ayumi Ishida also addressed her upcoming graduation, which she had announced the previous evening.

On June 16, the group appeared as guest performers at the Hello! Project Kenshusei Happyoukai "Lily" event at Zepp DiverCity in Tokyo. The event serves as a regular showcase for Hello! Project trainees to demonstrate their progress through live performances. This marked the group's first participation in a Hello! Project Kenshusei presentation event. During the concert, they performed songs including "Saikiyou" and took part in collaborative stages with the trainees. Members Oda, Makino, Haga, and Yokoyama, all former trainees themselves, also shared brief reflections on their trainee experiences in the event.

Following the 74th single's release, which debuted at number one on the Oricon Singles Chart, the group held a mini live and fan event on August 15 at Shinagawa Intercity Hall in Tokyo. During the event, Ayumi Ishida confirmed it would be her final single and announced that her last recordings would be included in the studio album Professionals-17th, released on November 27. She officially graduated on December 6 at the final stop of the autumn tour We Can Dance!, which was retitled We Can Dance!: Blå Eld Ishida Ayumi Final for the Yokohama Arena performance.

=== 2025: Erina Ikuta's, Akane Haga's, Reina Yokoyama's and Rio Kitagawa's graduations ===
On January 2, 2025, during the opening concert of the Hello! Project 2025 Winter Fes tour in Tokyo, current leader Erina Ikuta announced that she would graduate from Morning Musume '25 and Hello! Project at the end of the upcoming spring tour. The announcement coincided with her 14th anniversary as a member, the longest tenure in the group's history. The spring tour, titled Mighty Magic, is scheduled to run from March 15 to June 7. Her graduation will take place at Nippon Budokan on July 8, titled Might Magic DX: A Send-Off for Erina Ikuta. According to her agency, discussions about her future began in 2022, and she decided to leave both the group and agency to pursue a solo career in entertainment. Her final single with the group, titled "Ki ni Naru Sono Ki no Uta / Akaruku Ii Ko", is scheduled for release on July 2.

Ahead of the tour's start, on March 13, it was announced that Homare Okamura would temporarily suspend activities after being diagnosed with cervical disc herniation, following pain experienced during rehearsals for the Mighty Magic tour. She was advised to rest for about a month and missed several performances as a result. On April 11, her agency confirmed that she would return to the tour starting with the April 12 show in Aichi, though with limited participation due to ongoing symptoms.

Following Okamura's partial return, it was announced on April 17 that Rio Kitagawa would suspend her activities due to a violation of Hello! Project rules. She admitted to sharing exaggerated and inappropriate comments about daily life and work through a private social media account. After the posts were leaked and criticized, Kitagawa issued a public apology and personally apologized to affected members. She requested a hiatus to reflect on her actions. Her return date has not been determined.

On July 1, it was announced through Hello Project's website the new structure of Morning Musume '25 following Erina Ikuta's graduation on July 8. In the announcement, it was revealed that 12th generation member Miki Nonaka would succeed Erina Ikuta as the group's new leader, while fellow 12th generation member Maria Makino would be appointed as a new sub-leader alongside current sub-leader Sakura Oda. Along with the announcement, it was revealed that Sakura Oda would be graduating from Morning Musume and Hello! Project in 2026. Sakura Oda began discussing plans for her graduation around 2023, and with Erina Ikuta's graduation becoming concrete in 2024, further discussions about the next leader of the group were held and the timing of Oda's graduation was decided in this process. For this reason, Miki Nonaka will be taking the leader position while Sakura Oda would remain as sub-leader up until her graduation. Details regrarding Sakura Oda's graduation will be announced as soon as they are decided.

On July 4, a new update on Hello! Project's website announced that Rio Kitagawa is preparing to resume her activities sometime in autumn. As a result, she would be absent from Erina Ikuta's graduation concert on July 8 and the entire Hello! Con 2025 tour.

On July 8, Erina Ikuta graduated at the Morning Musume '25 Concert Tour Haru Mighty Magic DX ~Ikuta Erina wo Miokutte~.

On July 10, it was announced that Akane Haga and Reina Yokoyama will both graduate from Morning Musume and Hello! Project at the conclusion of the group's upcoming autumn tour. On September 15, they performed at ROCK IN JAPAN 2025 in Chiba Soga Sports Park.

On September 23, it was announced at the Morning Musume '25 Concert Tour Aki ~Movin' Forward~ concert in Nagano that Akane Haga and Reina Yokoyama would be graduating on December 5 with their graduation concert taking place at Yokohama Arena as the final concert of the autumn tour.

On October 20, it was announced that Rio Kitagawa will be graduating from Morning Musume and Hello! Project by the end of 2025. During the period Rio Kitagawa was on hiatus, she reflected about her careless actions and stated that she does not want to cause more trouble to the members and staff, and after discussions with the staff, she came to the conclusion on moving forward onto a new path and graduate from Morning Musume. At Rio Kitagawa's request to express her feelings to her fans, individual events and graduation activities in connection to the group's upcoming single "Teka HAPPY no HAPPY! / Watashi no Lamentazione", which will be her last, are also being planned. In addition, she will be also absent from the Morning Musume '25 Concert Tour Aki ~Movin' Forward with Hope~ Haga Akane ・ Yokoyama Reina Sotsugyou Special concert on December 5 as well.

On December 27, Rio Kitagawa officially graduated from Morning Musume and Hello! Project following the conclusion of her solo fanclub event.

=== 2026: Maria Makino's and Sakura Oda's graduations and 18th Generation ===
On March 19, it was announced that there will be new members joining the group as the 18th generation at a later date.

On March 21, it was announced during the Hello! Project Hina Fes 2026 <Morning Musume '26 & Hello Pro Kenshuusei Premium> that Hello Pro Kenshuusei member Meisa Sugihara had joined the group as the first 18th generation member.

On April 9, it was announced that Maria Makino would be graduating from Morning Musume and Hello! Project after the conclusion of the group's upcoming spring tour.

On April 11, it was announced at the Morning Musume '26 Concert Tour Haru - Rays Of Light - that Maria Makino would be graduating on June 24 with her graduation concert taking place at Nippon Budokan as the final concert of the spring tour.

On May 28, it was announced through Morning Musume '26's YouTube channel that Hanano Ishikawa joined the group as the second 18th generation member.

On June 2, it was announced through their YouTube channel that Hello Pro Kenshuusei member Moa Suzuki had joined the group as the third 18th generation member.

On June 11, it was announced through their YouTube channel that Miyu Yasuda had joined the group as the fourth and last 18th generation member.

On June 24, Maria Makino graduated at the Morning Musume '26 Concert Tour Haru - Rays Of Light - Final ~Makino Maria Sotsugyou Special~.

On September 30, the group will release their 77th single, "Lonely...But not Alone / Yes ka No ka Watashi ka".

== Life in the group ==
The audition process has been described by Ai Takahashi as involving a training camp of three days and two nights, in which participants were expected to learn a new song, a dance routine and a script.

The girls are afforded three holidays a year of five days each, in winter, in summer, and for the New Year.

In the past, the group has always had a leader and sub-leader, though neither comes with any responsibility. Takahashi has said that the role merely includes encouraging the others to do their best, while according to Niigaki, "there is nothing I have to do [as a sub-leader], but I want to support [the leader]."

== Sub-groups ==
- Tanpopo
- Petit Moni
- Mini-Moni
- Morning Musume Sakuragumi
- Morning Musume Otomegumi
- Morning Musume Tanjō 10nen Kinentai
- Ecomoni
- Dream Morning Musume

== Members ==
- Sakura Oda (2012–2026)
- Miki Nonaka (2014–present)
- Homare Okamura (2019–present)
- Mei Yamazaki (2019–present)
- Rio Sakurai (2022–present)
- Haruka Inoue (2023–present)
- Ako Yumigeta (2023–present)
- Meisa Sugihara (2026–present)
- Miyu Yasuda (2026–present)
- Moa Suzuki (2026–present)
- Hanano Ishikawa (2026–present)

== Discography ==
- First Time (1998)
- Second Morning (1999)
- 3rd: Love Paradise (2000)
- 4th Ikimasshoi! (2002)
- No. 5 (2003)
- Ai no Dai 6 Kan (2004)
- Rainbow 7 (2006)
- Sexy 8 Beat (2007)
- Platinum 9 Disc (2009)
- 10 My Me (2010)
- Fantasy! Jūichi (2010)
- 12, Smart (2011)
- 13 Colorful Character (2012)
- 14 Shō: The Message (2014)
- 15 Thank You, Too (2017)
- 16th: That's J-pop (2021)
- Professionals-17th (2024)

== Video games ==
- Space Venus (01/11/2001, PlayStation 2)

== Milestones and awards ==
- Oricon – Most Top 10 singles by an artist in Japan.
- Oricon – Most number one singles by a female group in Japan, beating the previous record set by Pink Lady. The record was later beaten by AKB48 in 2012.
- Oricon – Most consecutive Top 10 singles by a female group in Japan.
- Oricon – Best single selling female group in Japan—22,103,479 copies sold, their fifth Oricon record. The record was later beaten by AKB48 in 2012.

=== Golden Arrow Award ===
The Golden Arrow Award is presented by the Japan Magazine Publishers Association (JMPA) to recognize excellence in domestic media, such as in film, television, and music.

Year	Nominee / work	Award	Result
1998	Morning Musume	Newcomer Award (Music)	Won
1999	Morning Musume	Music Award	Won

=== Japan Academy Prize ===
The Japan Academy Prize is presented by the Japan Academy Film Prize Association for excellence in Japanese film.

Year	Nominee / work	Award	Result
2001	Morning Musume	Popularity Award	Won
2001	Pinch Runner	Newcomer Award	Won

=== Japan Cable Awards ===
The Japan Cable Awards are sponsored by the National Cable Music Broadcasters Association and are based on requests from the audience received by cable broadcasters.

Year	Nominee / work	Award	Result
1999	"Love Machine"	Excellence Award (Pops)	Won
2000	"I Wish"	Excellence Award (Pops)	Won

=== Japan Gold Disc Awards ===
The Japan Gold Disc Awards are the Recording Industry Association of Japan's annual music awards.

Year	Nominee / work	Award	Result
1999	Morning Musume	New Artist of the Year	Won
2000	"Love Machine"	Song of the Year	Won
2000	"Koi no Dance Site"	Song of the Year	Won
2001	"Happy Summer Wedding"	Song of the Year	Won
2001	3rd: Love Paradise	Pop Album of the Year	Won
2001	Best! Morning Musume 1	Pop Album of the Year	Won
2001	The Video Koi no Dance Site	Music Video of the Year (short term)	Won
2001	Video The Morning Musume Best 10	Music Video of the Year (long term)	Won

=== Japan Record Awards ===
The Japan Record Awards are presented by the Japan Composer's Association for outstanding achievements in the record industry.

Year	Nominee / work	Award	Result
1998	Morning Musume	Best New Artist Award	Won
1998	Morning Musume	New Artist Award	Won
1999	"Love Machine"	Japan Record Award	Nominated
1999	"Love Machine"	Gold Award	Won
2000	"Koi no Dance Site"	Japan Record Award	Nominated
2000	"Koi no Dance Site"	Gold Award	Won

=== Billboard Japan Music Awards ===
The Billboard Japan Music Awards are an annual set of music awards, founded by Billboard Japan, the Japanese online edition of the music magazine Billboard. In 2013, Morning Musume was awarded for the most active live performance act.

Year	Nominee / work	Award	Result
2013	Morning Musume	Active Artist of the Year	Won

== See also ==
- List of best-selling music artists in Japan
- List of best-selling girl groups

Preceded by Rina Chinen	Japan Record Award for Best New Artist; 1998	Succeeded by Amika Hattan

Preceded by None	Billboard Japan Awards for Active Artist of the Year; 2013	Succeeded by Not yet
