= Rainbow 7 =

Studio album by Morning Musume
- Released: February 15, 2006
- Recorded: 2005
- Genre: J-pop; dance-pop; pop rock
- Length: 52:56
- Label: Zetima Records
- Producer: Tsunku

Morning Musume chronology
Early Single Box (2004)	Rainbow 7 (2006)	7.5 Fuyu Fuyu Morning Musume Mini! (2006)

Limited Edition
- Front cover of limited edition.

Singles from Rainbow 7
- 1. "The Manpower!!!" Released: January 19, 2005; 2. "Osaka Koi no Uta" Released: April 27, 2005; 3. "Iroppoi Jirettai" Released: July 27, 2005; 4. "Chokkan 2 (Nogashita Sakana wa Ōkiizo!)" Released: November 19, 2005

Rainbow 7 (レインボー7) is the seventh album by the J-pop idol group Morning Musume. It is the first album to feature 7th generation member Koharu Kusumi and first album after graduation of Kaori Iida and Rika Ishikawa and departure of Mari Yaguchi. It was released on February 15, 2006.

== Overview ==
The album features the last single A-sides to feature founding member Kaori Iida and long-time members Rika Ishikawa and Mari Yaguchi, all of whom departed the band (Iida for a solo career, Yaguchi because of a scandal though she now works as a general entertainer, Ishikawa to focus on her new group V-u-den) in the months after their previous studio album, Ai no Dai 6 Kan, was released. Although their vocals are heard on these tracks, they are not credited anywhere in the liner notes. One of the singles represented, "Chokkan 2 (Nogashita Sakana wa Ōkiizo!)", appears in remixed form.

Three of the songs on the album are performed by smaller clusters of several group members, and are credited in the liner notes to the featured members involved, rather than to the entire band.

Two different versions of the album were released, different from the usual "first press" versions. The limited-edition version contained a 32-page photobook and had special packaging. When the two versions were announced it was said that each version (limited and normal) would have a different bonus track but, due to a problem on the manufacturer's end, the idea was abandoned.

=== Singles ===
The first single, "The Manpower!!!" (THE マンパワー!!!, The Manpawā!!!), became the last song recorded with the last founding member of the group Kaori Iida. It was released on January 19, 2005. Peaked at #4 on the Oricon Charts.There are two editions of the single. The limited edition was wrapped in a special package and had five photo cards with catalog number EPCE-5348. The regular edition has a catalog number EPCE-5349 and was contained with one photo card of the group on its first pressing. On the same date, the Single V DVD of the single was released. It is stated on the DVD that featured videos has an aspect image of 4:3, but are actually in widescreen. The song was the first official cheer song of the Tohoku Rakuten Golden Eagles. It was written by producer Tsunku.

The single "Iroppoi Jirettai" (色っぽい じれったい; "Sexy Impatient") was the debut of seventh generation member Koharu Kusumi. The limited edition of this single came with special packaging and also contained five photocards. The Single V was released on August 3, 2005, and sold a total of 22,606 copies. It reached number four on the Oricon Charts.

== Track listing ==
1. How Do You Like Japan? (Nihon wa Donna Kanji Dekka?) (How Do You Like Japan？～日本はどんな感じでっか？～)
2. The Manpower!!! (The マンパワー!!!)
3. Aozora ga Itsumademo Tsuzuku You na Mirai de Are! (青空がいつまでも続くような未来であれ!, The Future is Like an Eternally Continuing Blue Sky!)
4. Osaka Koi no Uta (大阪 恋の歌, Osaka Love Song)
5. Indigo Blue Love
  - Performed by Risa Niigaki, Reina Tanaka and Eri Kamei.
6. Rainbow Pink (レインボーピンク)
  - Performed by Koharu Kusumi and Sayumi Michishige.
7. Iroppoi Jirettai (色っぽい じれったい; Sexy Impatient)
8. Mushoku Tōmei na Mama de (無色透明なままで, Always Colourless and Invisible)
  - Performed by Hitomi Yoshizawa, Makoto Ogawa, Ai Takahashi, Asami Konno and Miki Fujimoto.
9. Purple Wind (パープルウインド)
10. Sayonara See You Again Adios Bye Bye Ta Ta! (さよなら See You Again アディオス Bye Bye チャッチャ!)
11. Chokkan 2 (Nogashita Sakana wa Ookiizo! (Mattaku Sono Toori Remix)) (直感2 〜逃した魚は大きいぞ!〜（全くその通リミックス）)
12. Joshi Kashimashi Monogatari 3 (女子かしまし物語３)

== Personnel ==
- Hitomi Yoshizawa – vocals (all tracks except 5 and 6)
- Ai Takahashi – vocals (all tracks except 5 and 6)
- Asami Konno – vocals (all tracks except 5 and 6)
- Makoto Ogawa – vocals (all tracks except 5 and 6)
- Risa Niigaki – vocals (all tracks except 6 and 8)
- Miki Fujimoto – vocals (all tracks except 5 and 6)
- Eri Kamei – vocals (all tracks except 6 and 8)
- Sayumi Michishige – vocals (all tracks except 5 and 8)
- Reina Tanaka – vocals (all tracks except 6 and 8)
- Koharu Kusumi – vocals (all tracks except 2, 4, 5 and 8)
- Kaori Iida – vocals (track 2 only, uncredited)
- Mari Yaguchi – vocals (tracks 2 and 4 only, uncredited)
- Rika Ishikawa – vocals (tracks 2 and 4 only, uncredited)
- Tsunku – Composer, vocals (background)
- Akira – keyboards, MIDI programming, backing vocals
- Hojin Egawa – bass
- Funky Sueyoshi – drums
- Ken Matsubara – all instruments (Track 2)
- Hideyuki "Daichi" Suzuki – guitar, keyboards, MIDI programming
- Yoshinari Takegami – brass arrangement, saxophone
- Masanori Suzuki – trumpet
- Masakki Ikeda – trombone
- Eiji Taniguchi – clarinet
- You Uchida – backing vocals
- Hiroaki Takeuchi – backing vocals
- Atsuko Inaba – backing vocals
- Yuichi Takahashi – guitar, keyboards, MIDI programming, backing vocals
- Hello! Project Wonderful Hearts Tour Staff – backing vocals
- Koji – electric guitar
- Masayoshi Furukawa – acoustic guitar
- Yasushi Sasamoto – bass
- Kaoru Ohkubo – keyboards, MIDI programming
- Taro Irie – bass
- Makoto Katayama – guitar
- Shoichiro Hirata – keyboards, MIDI programming
- Toru Kinoshita – guitar
- Hiroshi Iida – percussion
- Shunsuke Suzuki – keyboards, MIDI programming, guitar
- Kotaro Egami – remixing (Track 11)
- Hiroshi Imade – blues harp
- Siroh Tsubuyaki – tsubuyaki

=== Production ===
- Kazami Matsui - recording and mixing engineer
- Ryo Wakizaka - recording and mixing engineer
- Takeshi Yanagisawa - recording engineer
- Shinnosuke Kobayashi - recording engineer
- Tsunku - mix engineer
- Yuichi Ohtsubo - second engineer
- Hirofumi Hiraki - second engineer
- Youhei Horiuchi - second engineer
- Yasuji Yasman Maeda - mastering engineer

== Charts ==
- "The Manpower!!!" — #4 Japan Oricon Charts
- "The Manpower!!!" — #4 Japan CDTV
