= Asami Konno =

Japanese announcer and former Morning Musume member

Asami Konno 紺野 あさ美
- Born: Asami Konno (紺野 あさ美); May 7, 1987 (age 39); Toyohira-ku, Sapporo, Hokkaidō, Japan
- Occupations: television personality; singer; actress; dancer
- Musical career
- Genres: J-pop
- Years active: 2001-2011
- Label: Zetima

Asami Sugiura (杉浦 あさ美, Sugiura Asami; born May 7, 1987), known by her birth name Asami Konno (紺野 あさ美, Konno Asami) is a Japanese television presenter and former singer and actress.

She debuted in August 2001 with the girl group Morning Musume and participated in musical projects within Hello! Project. After leaving the group on March 31, 2011, she became a television presenter for TV Tokyo. Her husband is Japanese baseball player Toshihiro Sugiura.

== Biography ==
Konno joined the group Morning Musume in 2001. She passed the audition in Love Audition 21 (Loveオーディション 21, Love ōdishon nijuichi) although her skills had been called mediocre by the judges of the audition. Producer Tsunku even referred to her as a failure, but was curious to see how the addition of such a member would cause Morning Musume to change and grow

She debuted on the group's thirteenth single, "Mr. Moonlight (Ai no Big Band)," released on October 31, 2001. Her first album appearance was the fourth album 4th Ikimasshoi!, released on March 27, 2002.

In May of the same year, Konno was unexpectedly given the lead role for the second half of Morning Musume's annual play, Morning Town. In the summer of that year, she also debuted in a shuffle unit, as part of Odoru 11. She was separated from all the other fifth generation members, who were in Happy 7.

Later in September, all the fifth generation members were placed into a subgroup. Along with fellow member Risa Niigaki and Melon Kinenbi's Ayumi Shibata Konno was put into Tanpopo as the third generation. They only released one single.

Konno starred in a drama entitled Angel Hearts which was released in 2002.

2003, she was placed into Sakuragumi. Konno became one of its founding members, and remained with the unit until her graduation.

In July of the same year, she was added into Japanese idol pop band Country Musume with Miki Fujimoto. Under this new formation, named "Country Musume ni Konno to Fujimoto", three singles were released. She also made a guest appearance in a drama, Kochira Hon Ikegami Sho 2 that year, as a hit-and-run victim's sister.

In late 2004, Tsunku's chose to give Konno the main vocals for "Namida ga Tomaranai Hōkago".

In March 2006, she proved her athletic abilities by placing first in the 1500 meter race at Hello! Project's 2006 sports festival in the time of six minutes and thirteen seconds, getting her the MVP award. On July 23, 2006, Konno graduated from Morning Musume and Hello! Project to continue her studies at a university. The last single and album she participated in were "Ambitious! Yashinteki de Ii Jan" and Rainbow 7.

The news of Konno's acceptance to Keio University was announced on December 11, 2006. On December 28, 2006, she confirmed these claims personally, in a message posted on the main Hello! Project website.

Although she was officially no longer part of Hello! Project at the time, on January 28, 2007, she appeared on stage at Hello! Project's 10th anniversary concert.

On June 18, 2007, Up-Front Agency confirmed that Konno was returning to Hello! Project to rejoin members of Gatas Brilhantes H.P. in the Japanese pop idol group Ongaku Gatas. Their first single "Narihajimeta Koi no Bell" was released on August 22, 2007. It was stated that Konno would remain an active member within the agency and Ongaku Gatas while continuing her university studies.

She performed at the Hello Pro Award '09 Elder Club Sotsugyo Kinen Special concert on February 1, 2009.

In early 2009, Konno graduated from Hello! Project with the rest of the Elder Club, though continued as a member of her band Ongaku Gatas, and continuing to tour with them. It was announced via the Hello! Project official site on October 1, 2010, that she would debut as a reporter for TV Tokyo in April 2011.

It was announced on Tokyo Hive that she and her co-host Moeko Ueda would be releasing a single titled "Jyunjyou Fighter" under the unit name MoexKon. The single was released in 2011.

Konno and fellow former 5th generation member Makoto Ogawa made a special appearance at Morning Musume's Autumn Tour the day before Ai Takahashi's graduation.

She married professional baseball player Toshihiro Sugiura on New Year's Day, 2017. The couple have four children.

== Appearances ==
=== Filmography ===
==== DVDs ====
Title	Release date	Charts
Title	Release date	JP
Alo Hello! Asami Konno DVD (アロハロ!紺野あさ美DVD)	12 April 2006	6

#	Title	Release date
2	Morning Musume Asami Konno Graduation Memorial DVD (モーニング娘。紺野あさ美卒業メモリアル DVD, Mōningu Musume. Konno Asami Sotsugyō Memoriaru)	–
3	New Cyborg Shibata!! (新サイボーグしばたっ!!, Shin Saibōgu Shibata!!)	2004
4	Fight! Cyborg Shibata 3 (闘え!!サイボーグしばた 3, Tatakae!! Saibōgu Shibata 3)	2005

==== Dramas ====
- 2002 – Angel Hearts
- 2002 – Ore ga Aitsu de Aitsu ga Ore de (おれがあいつであいつがおれで)
- 2003 – Kochira Hon Ikegami Sho 2 (こちら本池上署2) (Guest)
- 2004 – New Cyborg Shibata (新サイボーグしばたっ!!, Shin Saibōgu Shibata!!)
- 2005 – Fight! Cyborg Shibata 3 (闘え!!サイボーグしばた 3, Tatakae!! Cyborg Shibata 3)

==== Movies ====
- 2002 – Tokkaekko (とっかえっ娘。)
- 2003 – Koinu Dan no Monogatari (子犬ダンの物語)

=== Photobooks ===
#	Title	Release date	ISBN
Solo
1	Asami Konno (紺野あさ美)	2004-08-24	ISBN 4-8470-2816-3
2	Natsufuku: Natsu o Sugosu Shōjo (なつふく ～夏を過ごす少女～)	2005-08-09	ISBN 4-8470-2877-5
3	Alo Hello! Asami Konno Shashinshū (アロハロ！紺野あさ美写真集)	2006-03-31	ISBN 4-04-894265-4
4	See You Again	2006-07-10	ISBN 4-8470-2939-9
5	Asami Konno Shashinshū Zenshu "Sweet Days" (紺野あさ美 写真集全集『Sweet Days』)	2006-09-12	ISBN 4-8470-2952-6
Group
1	5 Morning Musume 5th Generation Member Shashinshū (5 モーニング娘。5期メンバー写真集)	2002-08-13	ISBN 4-8470-2721-3

=== Radio ===
Program	Start date	End date
Tanpopo Henshūbu Oh-So-Ro! (タンポポ編集部 Oh-So-Ro!)	2002-09-24	2003-09-23
TBC Fun Fīrudo Mōretsu Mōdasshu (TBC Funふぃーるど・モーレツモーダッシュ)	2005-05-02	2005-05-13
Hello Pro Yanen!! (ハロプロやねん!!)	2006-06-09	
Hello Pro Yanen!! (ハロプロやねん!!)	2006-06-23	
Hello Pro Yanen!! (ハロプロやねん!!)	2006-06-30	

=== TV shows ===
Program	Start date	End date
Hello! Morning (ハロー！モーニング。)	2001	2006
Music Station (ミュージックステーション)	2001	2006
Utaban (うたばん)	2001	2006
Sore Yuke! Gorokkies (それゆけ!ゴロッキーズ)	2003-09-29	2003-12-26
Futarigoto (二人ゴト)	2004-04-14	2004-04-20
Futarigoto (二人ゴト)	2004-08-10	2004-08-17
Majokko Rika-chan no Magical v-u-den (魔女っ娘。梨華ちゃんのマジカル美勇伝)	2004-10-05	2004-12-15
Musume Dokyu! (娘Dokyu!)	2005-04-12	2006

=== Internet ===
Program	Start date	End date
The 13th Hello!Project Video Chat (第13回ハロプロビデオチャット)	2005-06-06	2005-06-06
Pocket Morning for Mobile Web (Gatas Diary Series of Asami Konno) (携帯サイト「ポケットモーニング娘。」にて『紺野あさ美のガッタス日記』を連載)	2005	2006
