= Makoto Ogawa =

Japanese singer and actress (born 1987)

- 小川 麻琴
- Born: October 29, 1987 (age 38); Kashiwazaki, Niigata, Japan
- Other names: Mako, Makocchan
- Occupations: Singer; actress; dancer
- Years active: 2001–2006, 2008–2015, 2016–present
- Musical career
- Genre: J-pop
- Instrument: Vocals
- Label: Zetima
- Formerly of: Morning Musume; Petitmoni; Otomegumi; Happy 7; Salt5; H.P. All Stars; Dream Morning Musume
- Website: http://helloproject.com/

Makoto Ogawa (小川 麻琴, Ogawa Makoto; born October 29, 1987) is a Japanese singer and actress, best known as a former member of Japanese girl group Morning Musume. She joined the group in August 2001 along with fellow fifth generation members Ai Takahashi, Risa Niigaki, and Asami Konno. On March 31, 2009, she graduated from Hello! Project with the rest of the Elder Club. Ogawa is currently a member of idol band Dream Morning Musume.

== Biography ==
Ogawa was born in Kashiwazaki, Niigata. Before joining the Japanese female idol group Morning Musume, Makoto Ogawa was enrolled at an entertainment school named Apple Little Performers (ALP) in Niigata. She made her CD debut on a cheer song for the J2 soccer team, Albirex Niigata. She has also been a fashion model for magazines and campaign, such as one for automobile safety for the elderly. Tsunku—producer and lyricist of Hello! Project—also commented that she was selected to join the group because she displayed great dancing skills and shined during the audition process.

Ogawa joined in Morning Musume on August 26, 2001 with Ai Takahashi, Asami Konno and Risa Niigaki

She also starred later in the TV drama Aijo Ippon!.

Ogawa was placed in Morning Musume's subgroup Morning Musume Otomegumi in January 2003 and released two singles as a part of the group before it went inactive

Ogawa graduated from Morning Musume on August 27, 2006 at the final performance of Hello! Project's musical rendition of Ribbon no Kishi. She left Morning Musume to study languages abroad, with the intent to return to Hello! Project. On June 6, 2008, a Japanese newspaper announced that Ogawa had returned to Hello! Project and would appear on the next Haromoni@ episode. She has just returned from studying English in New Zealand for nearly two years.

On March 31, 2009, she graduated from Hello!Project with the rest of the Elder Club. And became a part of Dream Morning Musume.

In September 2010, she joined the unit Afternoon Musume along with Yuko Nakazawa, Kaori Iida, Natsumi Abe, Kei Yasuda, Mari Yaguchi and Miki Fujimoto

In 2010, it was announced that Makoto Ogawa will be joining the new group "Dream Morning Musume" alongside other former-Morning Musume members.

In March 2013, Makoto Ogawa starred in a play called Tokugawa15. Former Morning Musume members Risa Niigaki and Aika Mitsui were special guests at some of the performances.

On 7 September 2026, Ogawa revealed she was married to wyse member Takuma Makita in 2015, both have a son was born after marriage, but they divorced in 2020.

== Joined groups ==
- Morning Musume
- Petitmoni
- Morning Musume Otomegumi
- Hello! Project shuffle units
- Elder Club
- M-Line
- Afternoon Musume
- Dream Morning Musume
- Metro Rabbits H.P.
- Gatas Brilhantes H.P.

== Photobooks ==
#	Title	Release date	Publisher	ISBN	Photobook information
–	5 – Morning Musume 5 Ki Member Shashinshū (5 モーニング娘。5期メンバー写真集)	13 August 2002	Wani Books	ISBN 4-8470-2721-3	Photobook starring all of the 5th generation members.
1	Ogawa Makoto Shashinshū (小川麻琴写真集)	2 February 2005	Wani Books	ISBN 4-8470-2844-9	First solo photobook.
2	Natsu no Uta (夏ノ詩)	26 August 2006	Wani Books	ISBN 4-8470-2954-2	Second solo photobook.

== Acts ==
=== Movies ===
- 2002 – Tokkaekko (とっかえっ娘。)
- 2003 – Koinu Dan no Monogatari (子犬ダンの物語)

=== Dramas ===
- 2002 – Angel Hearts
- 2004 – Aijō Ippon! (愛情イッポン！)
- 2009 – Q.E.D – Cameo as Art teacher

=== Musicals ===
- 2006 – Ribbon no Kishi: The Musical (リッボンの騎士ザ・ミュージカル) as Nylon

=== TV shows ===
Show	Start date	End date
Hello! Morning (ハロー！モーニング。)	2001	2006
Sore Yuke! Gorokkies (それゆけ!ゴロッキーズ)	29 September 2003	2003-12-26
Futarigoto (二人ゴト)	29 April 2004	2004-05-04
Futarigoto (二人ゴト)	2004-09-20	2004-09-28
Majokko Rika-chan no Magical v-u-den (魔女っ娘。梨華ちゃんのマジカル美勇伝)	5 October 2004	2004-12-15
Musume Dokyu! (娘DOKYU!)	13 April 2005	2005-07-01
Musume Dokyu! (娘DOKYU!)	2005-12-16	2005-12-22

=== Radio ===
Program	Start date	End date
TBC Fun Fīrudo Mōretsu Mōdasshu (TBC Funふぃーるど・モーレツモーダッシュ)	18 April 2005	2005-04-29
TBC Fun Fīrudo Mōretsu Mōdasshu (TBC Funふぃーるど・モーレツモーダッシュ)	2006-08-15	2006-08-21
Hello Pro Yanen!! (ハロプロやねん!!)	2005-06-26	

=== Anime ===
- 2021 -

Tōkyō Myū Myū Nyū (東京ミュウミュウニュー)
