= Hitomi Yoshizawa =

Japanese singer and actress

- 吉澤 ひとみ
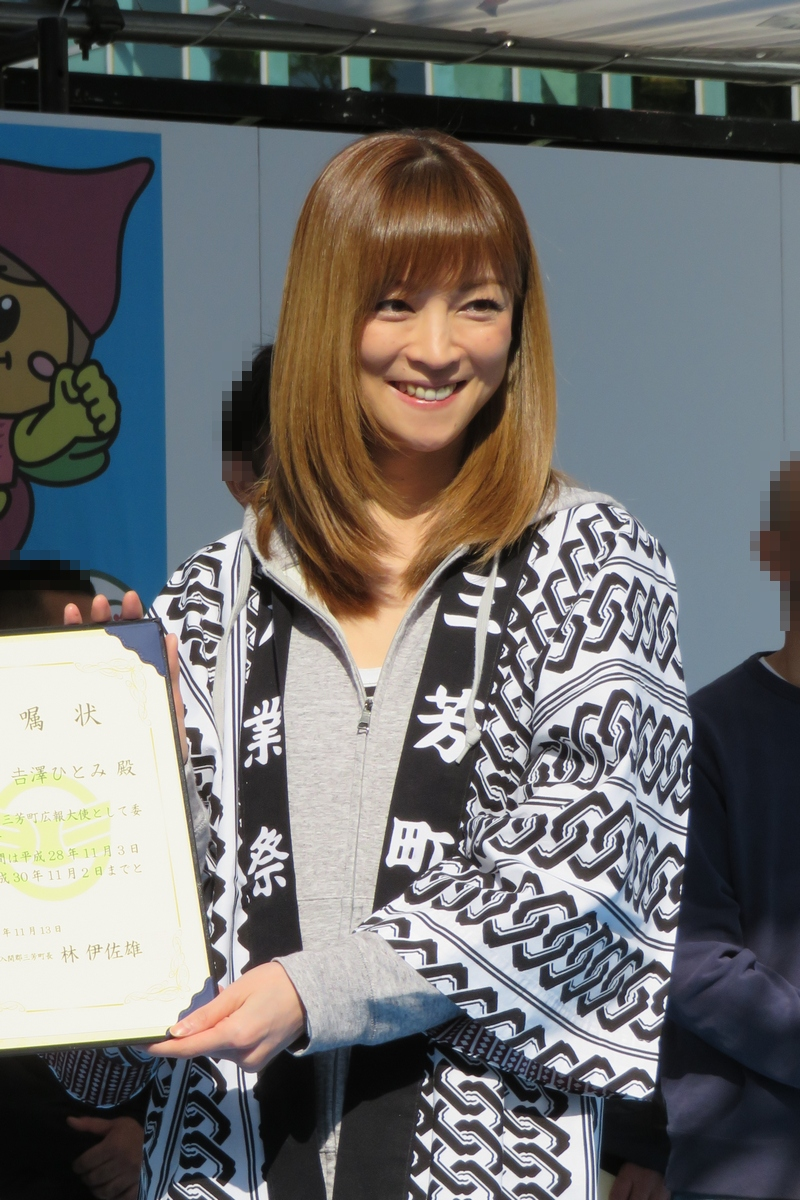
- Hitomi Yoshizawa in 2016
- Born: April 12, 1985 (age 41); Miyoshi, Saitama, Japan
- Occupations: singer; actress; model
- Years active: 2000–2018
- Children: 1
- Musical career
- Genres: J-pop
- Label: Zetima
- Formerly of: Dream Morning Musume; Hangry & Angry; Morning Musume; Petitmoni; Sakuragumi; Ongaku Gatas; 10-nin Matsuri; Sexy 8; Venus Mousse; 11Water; H.P. All Stars

Hitomi Yoshizawa (吉澤 ひとみ, Yoshizawa Hitomi; born April 12, 1985) is a Japanese former singer and actress. In 2000, Yoshizawa debuted as a 4th generation member of the idol girl group Morning Musume and became their leader in 2005 until leaving the group in 2007. Following her departure, Yoshizawa continued to appear in several music projects, including Hangry & Angry, Abcho, and Dream Morning Musume.

On September 28, 2018, Yoshizawa announced she was retiring from entertainment following public scrutiny of her involvement in a vehicle accident and subsequent arrest.

== Career ==
=== 2000-2007: Morning Musume ===
Yoshizawa became a member of the Hello! Project group Morning Musume in 2000, as a member of the fourth generation along with Rika Ishikawa, Nozomi Tsuji, and Ai Kago, making her debut in the group's ninth single "Happy Summer Wedding". She was also featured in the group's theatrical release of Pinch Runner. She also appeared with the group in the weekly television show Hello! Morning in various segments including a survival match featuring the members of the 5th and 6th Generations where she played the role of the referee.

In the past, she has often been perceived as the tomboyish member of the group, due to her voice, manners, and hobbies. Furthering this perception of her masculine side, Yoshizawa's first lead came in 2001 with the release of the single "Mr. Moonlight: Ai no Big Band", in which she played a dashing playboy character.

Yoshizawa became the captain of the Hello! Project futsal team, Gatas Brilhantes H.P. when it was formed in September 2003. The 5 ft 5 in (165 cm) midfielder has since managed to lead the team to victory on many occasions. Yoshizawa also convinced teammate Nozomi Tsuji to remain as the team's goalkeeper, despite her graduation from Morning Musume in 2004.

In April 2005, after Mari Yaguchi left Morning Musume, Yoshizawa, the current sub-leader, became the group's new leader.

=== 2007-2018: Hangry & Angry, Ab-cho, and retirement ===
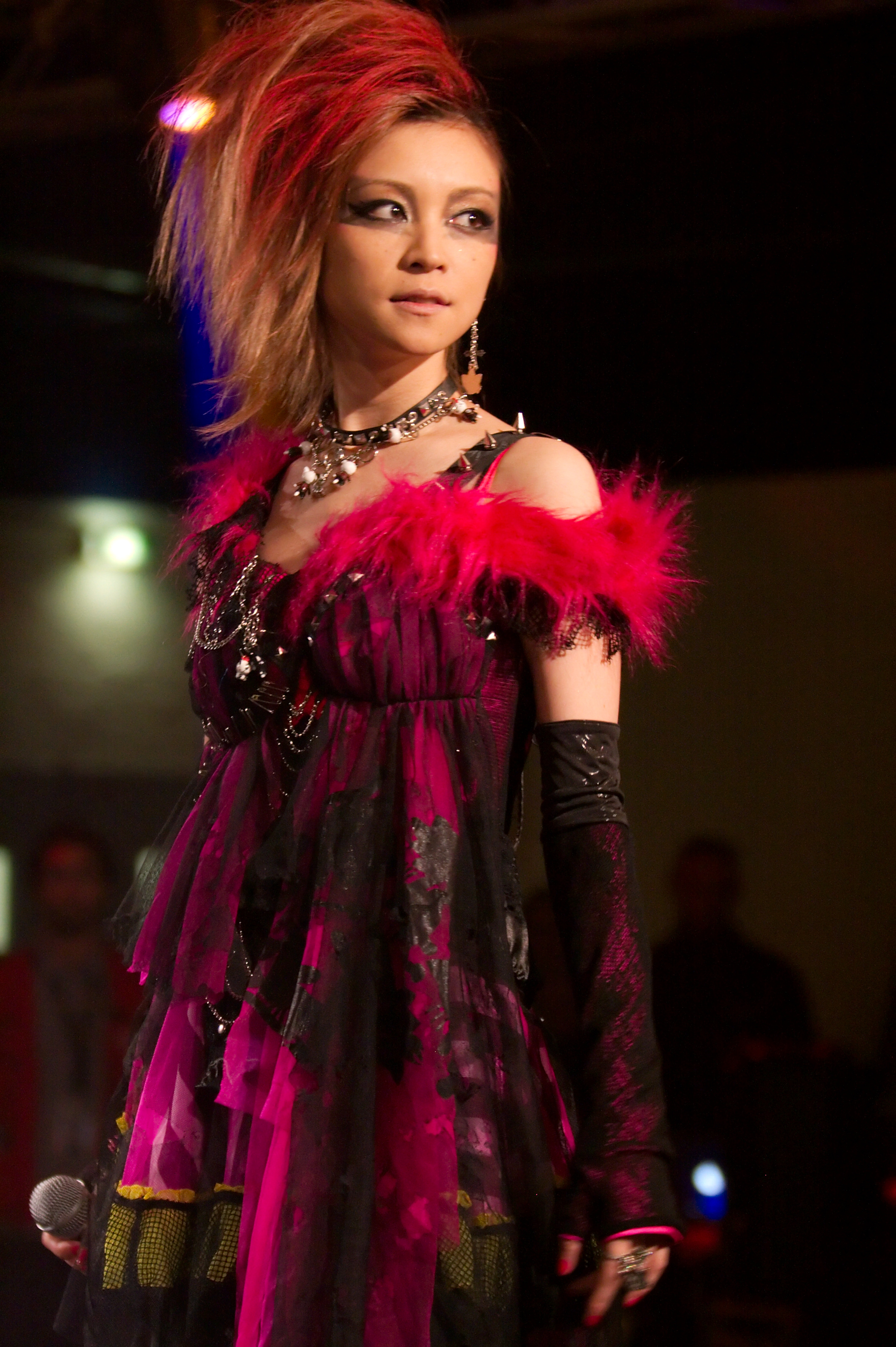
Yoshizawa performing as Hangry & Angry at Chibi Japan Expo on October 31, 2009

On May 6, 2007, Yoshizawa graduated from Morning Musume after the band's last performance in the Sexy 8 Beat Spring Tour, which took place at Saitama Super Arena. According to several news sources, producer Tsunku, and Yoshizawa herself, she would enter a solo career of her own.

Yoshizawa then focused her time on Gatas Brilhantes H.P., along with being leader of a group formed with fellow members of the futsal team called Ongaku Gatas.

On October 12, 2008, Yoshizawa paired up with fellow ex-Morning Musume member Rika Ishikawa in the new unit Hangry & Angry in collaboration with the Harajuku fashion store of the same name. With Yoshizawa performing under the character name "Hangry", the duo made their first US performance at Sakura-Con in Seattle in April 2009. Their first European performance was at "Chibi Japan Expo" in Montreuil on October 31, 2009.

In February 2009, Yoshizawa performed with the rest of the Elder Club at their group graduation concert in Yokohama. Yoshizawa made her first post-Hello! Project at the Summer 2010 tour, acting as MC alongside Sharam Q member Makoto. In 2010, Yoshizawa joined Dream Morning Musume alongside other former-Morning Musume members. In May 2012, Yoshizawa and Rika Ishikawa formed a Japanese pop unit called Abcho.

On September 6, 2018, Yoshizawa was involved in a hit-and-run caused by her drinking above the legal alcohol limit. Following backlash, on September 28, she issued a statement via her agency announcing that she was retiring from entertainment industry. Footage of her performances at Hello! Project's 20th anniversary concert was removed from the DVD release.

== Personal life ==
=== Family and relationships ===
On January 11, 2007, Yoshizawa's younger brother, 16-year-old Kōta Yoshizawa, was killed in a traffic accident.

On November 22, 2015, Yoshizawa announced that she had married a non-celebrity man. In March 2016, Yoshizawa announced she was pregnant with her first child and that she would give birth to a son in the late summer of 2016. On July 29, she announced on her blog that she gave birth to a boy.

=== Legal troubles ===
On September 6, 2018, at 7:00 am, Yoshizawa ran a red light in Nakano, Tokyo while driving a van at 86 kilometers per hour and hit a female cyclist, who then collided with a male pedestrian. After fleeing the scene, Yoshizawa reported the incident to the police and returned 15 minutes later, where she was arrested for allegedly causing a hit-and-run accident while driving under the influence. A breathalyzer test revealed 0.58 mg of alcohol per liter of exhaled air, four times the legal limit in Japan. Yoshizawa informed the police that she drank three cans of chuhai; however, after further investigation, the police discovered that she had consumed more alcohol than from what she had originally stated. Following the incident, Yoshizawa's mother-in-law attempted suicide and was rushed to the hospital for emergency treatment. Yoshizawa was indicted on September 26, but was bailed out of Harajuku Police Station for ¥3 million. The Tokyo District Court sentenced Yoshizawa to two years and five months in prison and for suspension of her driver's license for five years. Yoshizawa herself publicly vowed not to renew her driver's license again. As a result of the incident, Yoshizawa retired from the entertainment industry and voluntarily stepped down from her position as the public relations ambassador of her hometown, Miyoshi, Saitama.

== Filmography ==
=== Movies ===
- 2000 – Pinch Runner (ピンチランナー)
- 2002 – Tokkaekko (とっかえっ娘。)
- 2003 – Koinu Dan no Monogatari (仔犬ダンの物語)

=== Dramas ===
- 2002 – Ore ga Aitsu de Aitsu ga Ore de (おれがあいつであいつがおれで)
- 2004 – Motto Koiseyo Otome (もっと恋セヨ乙女)
- 2007 – Shinkansen Girl (新幹線ガール)

== Photobooks ==
#	Title	Release date	Publisher	ISBN	Photobook information
1	Yossy (よっすぃ)	October 6, 2001	Wani Books	ISBN 978-4-8470-2676-8	First solo photobook
–	Pocket Morning Musume (Vol. 1) (ポケットモーニング娘。〈Vol.1〉)	September 2003	Rokusaisha	ISBN 978-4-8463-0525-3	Fourth Generation member pocket photobook
2	8teen	March 20, 2004	Wani Books	ISBN 978-4-8470-2798-7	Second solo photobook
3	Hello! Yossy	April 20, 2007	Kadokawa SS Communications	ISBN 978-4-8275-3051-3	Third solo photobook
