= Onna to Otoko no Lullaby Game =

- Regular edition cover.

Single by Morning Musume

from the album Fantasy! Jūichi
- B-side: "Aisare Sugiru Koto wa Nai no yo"
- Released: November 17, 2010
- Recorded: 2010
- Genre: Pop; dance-pop; electropop; downtempo
- Length: 4:36
- Label: Zetima
- Songwriter: Tsunku
- Producer: Tsunku

Morning Musume singles chronology
"Seishun Collection" (2010)	"Onna to Otoko no Lullaby Game" (2010)	"Maji Desu ka Ska!" (2011)

"Onna to Otoko no Lullaby Game" (女と男のララバイゲーム, Onna to Otoko no Rarabai Gēmu; "Men and Women's Lullaby Game") is the 44th single by J-pop girl group Morning Musume. It is the last single to feature Eri Kamei, Junjun and Linlin prior to their graduation. The single was released in four editions: Limited A, B and C, and normal. The limited editions each came with a different DVD. The limited edition releases, as well as the first press of the normal edition, also came with an event serial number card. The Single V was released on November 24, 2010. The single debuted at #6 on the weekly Oricon charts, selling a reported total of 42,405 copies in the first week.

== Track listing ==
All tracks are written by Tsunku.

CD
No.	Title	Length
1.	"Onna to Otoko no Lullaby Game" (女と男のララバイゲーム "Men and Women's Lullaby Game")	4:38
2.	"Aisare Sugiru Koto wa Nai no yo" (愛され過ぎることはないのよ "There's no Such Thing as Too Much Love")	4:49
3.	"Onna to Otoko no Lullaby Game (Instrumental)"	4:37
Total length:		14:04

Limited Edition DVD A
No.	Title	Length
1.	"Onna to Otoko no Lullaby Game (White Dance Shot Ver.)"	4:51

Limited Edition DVD B
No.	Title	Length
1.	"Onna to Otoko no Lullaby Game (Close-up Ver.)"

Limited Edition DVD C
No.	Title	Length
1.	"Onna to Otoko no Lullaby Game (Black Dance Shot Ver.)"

== Members ==
- 5th generation: Ai Takahashi, Risa Niigaki
- 6th generation: Eri Kamei (last single), Sayumi Michishige, Reina Tanaka
- 8th generation: Aika Mitsui, Junjun (last single), Linlin (last single)

Onna to Otoko no Lullaby Game

Main Voc: Ai Takahashi, Reina Tanaka

Center Voc: Risa Niigaki, Eri Kamei

Minor Voc: Sayumi Michishige, Aika Mitsui, Junjun, Linlin

Aisaresugiru Koto wa Nai no yo

Main Voc: Ai Takahashi, Reina Tanaka

Center Voc: Risa Niigaki, Eri Kamei, Sayumi Michishige, Aika Mitsui, Junjun, Linlin
