= Fantasy! Jūichi =

Studio album by Morning Musume
- Released: December 1, 2010
- Recorded: 2010
- Genre: J-pop; electronic dance; pop rock; motown
- Length: 49:39
- Label: Zetima Records
- Producer: Tsunku

Morning Musume chronology
10 My Me (2010)	Fantasy! Jūichi (2010)	12, Smart (2011)

Singles from Fantasy! Jūichi
- 1. "Seishun Collection" Released: June 9, 2010; 2. "Onna to Otoko no Lullaby Game" Released: November 17, 2010

Fantasy! Jūichi (Fantasy! 拾壱, Fantasy! Eleven) is the eleventh studio album by Japanese girl group Morning Musume. The album was released on December 1, 2010, in a normal and limited edition, the first press of the normal edition coming with a photocard, and the limited edition coming with a bonus DVD (containing solo shots of each member for the "Onna to Otoko no Lullaby Game" PV, and the graduation announcement) and a different cover. The album, their second album release in less than a year, was the last to feature sixth-generation member Eri Kamei and eighth-generation members Junjun and Linlin prior to their December 15 graduation.

== Writing and development ==
The album's concept, as stated by writer and producer Tsunku, is "a mixture of fantasy and reality". The album's songs represent various genres, from rock and pop to Motown. The opening song, "Onna to Otoko no Lullaby Game", is described as the "prologue" to the album.

The album features two solos: "Ai no Honō", performed by Reina Tanaka, and "Denwa de ne", performed by Ai Takahashi. While these are the only solos, other members are allocated main vocals on some songs: Sayumi Michishige on "Fantasy ga Hajimaru", Risa Niigaki on "Onna Gokoro to Nan to Yara", and Eri Kamei on "Itoshiku Kurushii Kono Yoru ni". Similarly to the group's previous album, 10 My Me, the eighth generation, Aika Mitsui, Junjun and Linlin are heavily featured on the same track: track 7, "Sungoi My Birthday".

Ai Takahashi and Eri Kamei provide almost all of the chorus vocals on the album; Kamei is featured in the chorus of all but two songs, Tanaka and Takahashi's solos, and Takahashi is featured on all songs except tracks 5 and 9. Producer Tsunku also appears in the chorus for track 2, "Bravo!".

== Singles ==
The album only features two singles, a rarity for the group. It also does not include "Appare Kaiten Zushi!", a promotional song released under the name "Muten Musume".

The first single from the album, "Onna to Otoko no Lullaby Game", was released on November 27, 2010 as the group's 44th single. Although it was a graduation single it charted relatively poorly, peaking at #6 on the Oricon singles chart, despite a reported total of 42,405 copies in its first week.

The second and final single to be featured on the album, "Seishun Collection", was released on June 6, 2010. The single, their 43rd, reached a weekly peak of #3 on the Oricon singles charts, making it one of the group's more successful singles of recent years.

== Track listing ==
All tracks are written by Tsunku

CD
No.	Title	Arrangement	Length
1.	"Onna to Otoko no Lullaby Game (AL Ver.)" (女と男のララバイゲーム, Men and Women's Lullaby Game)	Shoichiro Hirata	5:14
2.	"Bravo!" (ブラボー!)	Shunsuke Susuzki	4:31
3.	"Fantasy ga Hajimaru" (Fantasyが始まる, Fantasy Begins)	Kaoru Okubo	3:45
4.	"Onna Gokoro to Nan to Yara" (女心となんとやら, A Girl's Heart and All That)	Yusuke Itagaki	4:52
5.	"Ai no Honō" (愛の炎, Flames of Love) (Performed by Reina Tanaka)	Nao Tanaka	4:03
6.	"I'm Lucky Girl"	Yusuke Itagaki	4:22
7.	"Sungoi My Birthday" (すんごいマイバースディ, My Wonderful Birthday)	Yuichi Takahashi	4:10
8.	"Ichi kara Jū Made Aishite Hoshii" (1から10まで愛してほしい, I Want You to Love Me from 1 to 10)	Shunsuke Suzuki	4:38
9.	"Itoshiku Kurushii Kono Yoru ni" (愛しく苦しいこの夜に, On This Dear, Painful Night)	Koichi Yuasa	4:57
10.	"Denwa de ne" (電話でね, On The Phone, Right?) (Performed by Ai Takahashi)	Akira	4:26
11.	"Seishun Collection" (青春コレクション, Youth Collection)	Kaoru Okubo	4:41
Total length:			49:39

DVD
No.	Title	Length
1.	"Onna to Otoko no Lullaby Game (Ai Takahashi Solo Album Ver.)"	4:46
2.	"Onna to Otoko no Lullaby Game (Risa Niigaki Solo Album Ver.)"	4:44
3.	"Onna to Otoko no Lullaby Game (Eri Kamei Solo Album Ver.)"	4:44
4.	"Onna to Otoko no Lullaby Game (Sayumi Michishige Solo Album Ver.)"	4:44
5.	"Onna to Otoko no Lullaby Game (Reina Tanaka Solo Album Ver.)"	4:44
6.	"Onna to Otoko no Lullaby Game (Aika Mitsui Solo Album Ver.)"	4:43
7.	"Onna to Otoko no Lullaby Game (Junjun Solo Album Ver.)"	4:45
8.	"Onna to Otoko no Lullaby Game (Linlin Solo Album Ver.)"	4:48
9.	"Hello! Project 2010 Summer: Fancolla! Eri Kamei, Junjun, Linlin Graduation Announcement MC" (Hello!Project 2010 SUMMER ～ファンコラ!～亀井絵里、ジュンジュン、リンリン卒業発表MC)	10:05
10.	"Album Jacket Photo Shoot: Making of" (アルバムジャケット撮影メイキング)	4:46

== Chart performance ==
The album peaked at #16 on the weekly Oricon music charts and charted for three weeks, selling 10,554 copies in its first week.

== Personnel ==
- Kazuyoshi Araki - A&R coordination
- Yutaka Asahina - produced assistant (TNX)
- Shirohide Azuma - art direction & design (W.PG)
- Chino - chorus (5)
- Dolls House Japan - special thanks
- Misako Fukuda - sales promotion
- Shin Hashimoto - label manager
- Akane Ichishima - hair & make-up
- Miyuki Ito - promotion
- Junjun - vocal, chorus (6, 7)
- Koji Kamada - director (TNX)
- Eri Kamei - vocal, chorus (1, 2, 3, 4, 6, 7, 8, 9, 11)
- Kantaro Kawada - management
- Kazuhiko Kawata - sales promotion
- Ayuchi Kenmochi - recording coordination desk (TNX)
- Shintaro Kikuchi - special thanks (No Fake No Fade)
- Saki Kimura - produced assistant (TNX)
- Shinnosuke Kobayashi - recording coordination (TNX)
- Yusuke Kozuka - photographer
- Linlin - vocal, chorus (6, 7)
- Yasuji Yasman Maeda - mastering engineer (Berine Grundman Mastering)
- Kazumi Matsui - mixing engineer (3, 4, 6, 9), recording engineer
- Keigo Mikami - special thanks (Popholic)
- Aika Mitsui - vocal, chorus (7)
- Shuhei Miyaichi - promotion
- Masayuki Miyazaki - management
- Natsuki Mukai - promotion desk
- Yoji Mochida - artist producer
- Tomoko Nakamura - promotion
- Hitomi Nakano - producer's management desk (TNX)
- Risa Niigaki - vocal, chorus (3, 4)
- Yoshitake Ogawa - producer's chief management (TNX)
- Yusuke Ogawa - assistant engineer
- Toshiya Ohta - hair & make-up (Maroon Brand)
- Naoya Ohtani - chief promotion
- Satoshi Oka - special thanks (Supa Love)
- Haruka Okayasu - chief promotion
- Mitsuhiro Sagara - producer's management (TNX)
- Hiroharu Saito - hair & make-up
- Yukina Saito - management
- Yukio Seto - label producer
- Hiromi Sugusawa - sales promotion desk
- Satoru Takase - stylist
- Ai Takahashi - vocal, chorus (1, 2, 3, 4, 6, 7, 8, 10, 11)
- Kyoko Takeuchi - art direction & design (W.PG)
- Sho Takimoto - management
- Sugie Tokiwa - chief producer
- Tsunku - producer, chorus (2)
- Shiina Ueki - A&R coordination desk
- Nobuyasu Umemoto - producer's assistant (TNX)
- Ryo Wakizaka - mixing engineer (1, 2, 5, 7, 8, 10, 11), recording engineer
- Chihiro Watanabe - promotion
- Eiko Watanabe - hair & make-up
- Kazuya Yamazawa - producer's management (TNX)
- Nsoki Yamazaki - executive producer
- Takeshi Yanagisawa - recording engineer
- Sayaka Yoshida - promotion desk
