= Kimagure Princess =

Single by Morning Musume

from the album 10 My Me
- Released: October 28, 2009 (CD); November 4, 2009 (DVD)
- Recorded: 2009
- Genre: J-pop; electropop; dance-pop
- Label: Zetima
- Producer: Tsunku

Morning Musume singles chronology
"Nanchatte Renai" (2009)	"Kimagure Princess" (2009)	"Onna ga Medatte Naze Ikenai" (2010)

Music video
- Kimagure Princess on YouTube

"Kimagure Princess" (気まぐれプリンセス, Kimagure Purinsesu; "Fickle Princess") is the 41st single by Hello! Project unit Morning Musume. The single was released on October 28, 2009 and was used as the ending theme for TV Tokyo's show, "The Gyakuryū Researchers". It was the last single featuring Morning Musume's seventh generation member Koharu Kusumi. The Single V DVD for "Kimagure Princess" was released on November 4, 2009. The music video for the single was recorded at La Foresta di Magnifica. This was released in four editions, limited A & B coming with DVDs, while limited C comes with 10 changeable covers (one for each member and one for the group) and a regular edition

== Track listing ==
=== CD ===
1. "Kimagure Princess" (気まぐれプリンセス; "Whimsical Princess")
2. "Aishite Aishite Ato Ippun" (愛して 愛して 後一分)
3. "Kimagure Princess" (Instrumental)

=== Limited Edition A DVD ===
1. "Kimagure Princess (Dance Shot Ver.)" – 4:32

=== Limited Edition B DVD ===
1. "Kimagure Princess (Close-up Ver.)" – 4:30

=== Single V DVD ===
1. "Kimagure Princess"
2. "Kimagure Princess (Green Dance Ver.)"
3. "Making Of" (メイキング映像, Meikingu Eizō)

=== Event V ===
1. "Kimagure Princess (Ai Takahashi Solo Ver.)"
2. "Kimagure Princess (Risa Niigaki Solo Ver.)"
3. "Kimagure Princess (Eri Kamei Solo Ver.)"
4. "Kimagure Princess (Sayumi Michishige Solo Ver.)"
5. "Kimagure Princess (Reina Tanaka Solo Ver.)"
6. "Kimagure Princess (Koharu Kusumi Solo Ver.)"
7. "Kimagure Princess (Aika Mitsui Solo Ver.)"
8. "Kimagure Princess (Junjun Solo Ver.)"
9. "Kimagure Princess (Linlin Solo Ver.)"

== Featured lineup ==
- 5th generation: Ai Takahashi, Risa Niigaki
- 6th generation: Eri Kamei, Sayumi Michishige, Reina Tanaka
- 7th generation: Koharu Kusumi (last single)
- 8th generation: Aika Mitsui, Junjun, Linlin

Kimagure Princess Vocals

Main Voc: Ai Takahashi, Eri Kamei

Center Voc: Risa Niigaki, Reina Tanaka

Minor Voc: Sayumi Michishige, Koharu Kusumi, Aika Mitsui, Junjun, Linlin

Aishite Aishite Ato Ippun Vocals

Main Voc: Ai Takahashi, Risa Niigaki

Center Voc: Eri Kamei, Sayumi Michishige, Reina Tanaka

Minor Voc: Koharu Kusumi, Aika Mitsui, Junjun, Linlin

== Chart positions ==
Oricon
Oricon	Daily (November 1, 2009)
Oricon	#2
Oricon	Weekly (October 27, 2009 – November 4, 2009)
Oricon	#4
Oricon	Monthly (October 2009)
Oricon	#14
Oricon	Total sales
Oricon	44,220; As of November 17, 2009
Billboard Japan Hot 100	November 3, 2009 – November 9, 2009
Billboard Japan Hot 100	#14
Billboard Japan Hot Singles Sales	November 3, 2009 – November 9, 2009
Billboard Japan Hot Singles Sales	#4
Billboard Japan Hot Top Airplay	November 3, 2009 – November 9, 2009
Billboard Japan Hot Top Airplay	#56
