= Shōganai Yume Oibito =

- CD single cover

Single by Morning Musume

from the album 10 My Me
- B-side: "3,2,1 Breakin' Out"
- Released: May 13, 2009
- Recorded: 2009
- Genre: Pop
- Length: 14:47
- Label: Zetima
- Songwriter: Tsunku
- Producer: Tsunku

Morning Musume singles chronology
"Naichau Kamo" (2009)	"Shōganai Yume Oibito" (2009)	"Nanchatte Ren'ai" (2009)

Music videos
- Shōganai Yume Oibito on YouTube
- 3,2,1 Breakin' Out! on YouTube

"Shōganai Yume Oibito" (しょうがない 夢追い人; "Helpless Dream Chaser") is the 39th single release by the J-pop group Morning Musume. It was released under the Zetima label on May 13, 2009. The CD was released in one regular and two limited editions, Limited A and Limited B, on the same day. The single ranked #1 on Oricon's weekly chart, making it their first #1 since their single "Aruiteru", released in late 2006, and the first #1 Morning Musume single featuring 8th generation members Aika Mitsui, Junjun, and Linlin. The Single V version of the single was released on May 20, 2009.

== Contents ==
The single includes a coupling track and an instrumental track of "Shōganai Yume Oibito". The coupling track, "3, 2, 1 Breakin' Out!", was the official theme song for Anime Expo 2009.

Both limited edition releases of the single sport different album covers and include DVDs containing alternate versions of the "Shōganai Yume Oibito" music video. The Limited A DVD contains "Shōganai Yume Oibito (Dance Shot Ver.)", a music video consisting completely of Morning Musume performing the dance created for the single. The Limited B DVD contains "Shōganai Yume Oibito (Close-up Ver.)", a video consisting completely of solo shots of the members.

The Single V DVD contains three tracks; the first being the regular version of the "Shōganai Yume Oibito" music video, the only version fully shown on television. The second and third tracks are "Shōganai Yume Oibito (Drama Ver.)" and a video showing the creation of the music videos.

== Music videos ==
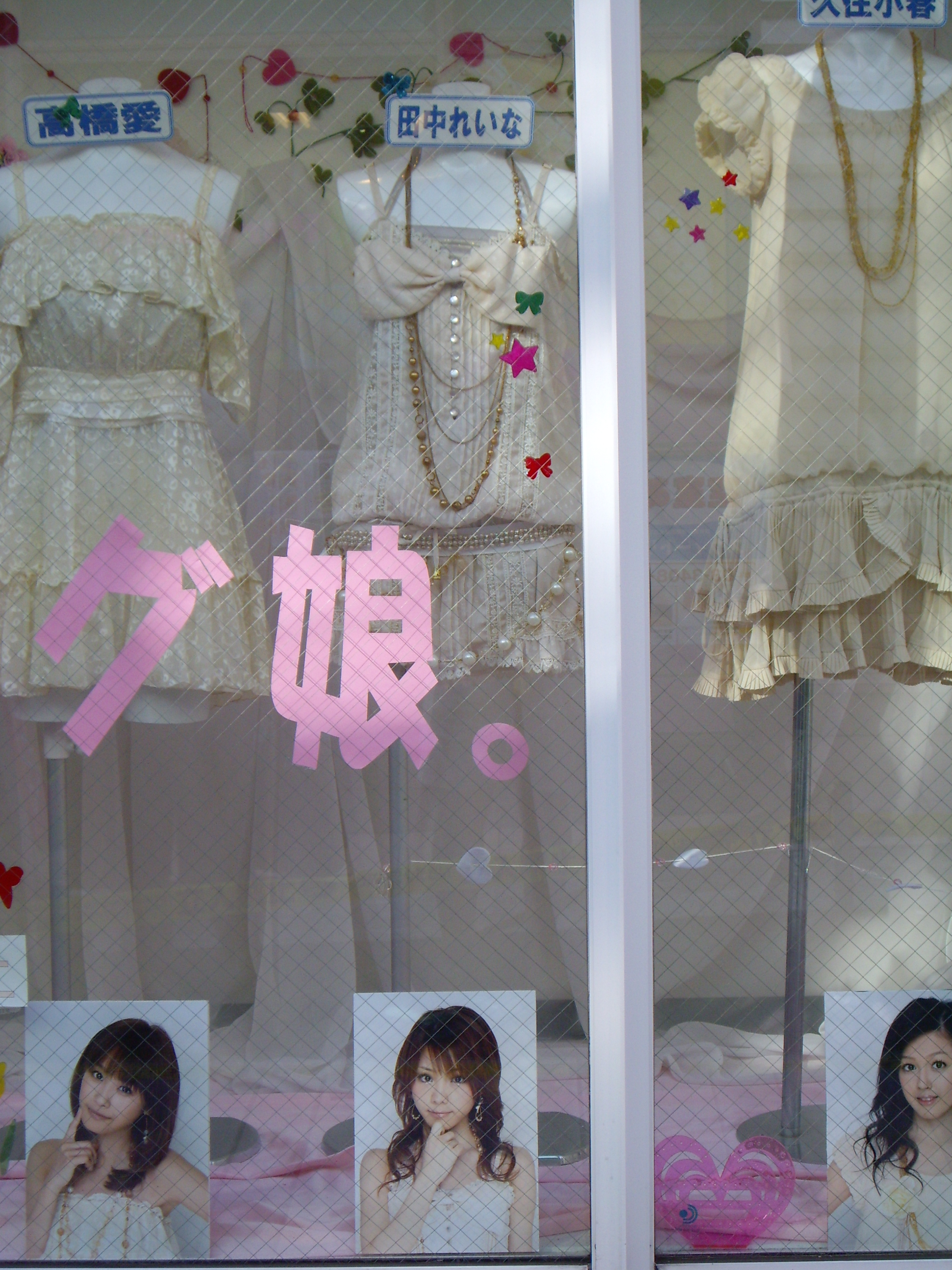
Outfits featured in the music video and promotional media for "Shōganai Yume Oibito" (pictured in 2009)

Following the release of the single, Anime Expo announced on their website, that Morning Musume, in collaboration with MySpace, was holding a worldwide contest, to create a music video for a shortened version of "3, 2, 1 Breakin' Out!". Up-Front had released a set of videos of the Morning Musume members performing in front of a greenscreen for applicants to use upon agreeing to contest and usage rules. The results of the contest were announced at Anime Expo in July and the winner was awarded 390,000 yen.

== Track listing ==
All tracks are written by Tsunku.

CD
No.	Title	Length
1.	"Shōganai Yume Oibito" (しょうがない 夢追い人 "Helpless Dream Chaser")	5:06
2.	"3,2,1 Breakin' Out!"	4;36
3.	"Shōganai Yume Oibito (Instrumental)"	5:05

Limited Edition DVD A
No.	Title	Length
1.	"Shōganai Yume Oibito (Dance Shot Ver.)"	5:21

Limited Edition DVD B
No.	Title	Length
1.	"Shōganai Yume Oibito (Close-Up Ver.)"	5:21

Single V
No.	Title	Length
1.	"Shōganai Yume Oibito"	5:21
2.	"Shōganai Yume Oibito (Drama Ver.)"	5:21
3.	"Making Eizō (メイキング映像, Meikingu Eizō; Making Of)"

Event V
No.	Title	Length
1.	"Shouganai Yume Oibito (Ai Takahashi Ver.)"	5:21
2.	"Shouganai Yume Oibito (Risa Niigaki Ver.)"	5:21
3.	"Shouganai Yume Oibito (Eri Kamei Ver.)"
4.	"Shouganai Yume Oibito (Sayumi Michishige Ver.)"
5.	"Shouganai Yume Oibito (Reina Tanaka Ver.)"
6.	"Shouganai Yume Oibito (Koharu Kusumi Ver.)"
7.	"Shouganai Yume Oibito (Aika Mitsui Ver.)"
8.	"Shouganai Yume Oibito (Junjun Ver.)"
9.	"Shouganai Yume Oibito (Linlin Ver.)"

== Featured lineup ==
- 5th generation: Ai Takahashi, Risa Niigaki
- 6th generation: Eri Kamei, Sayumi Michishige, Reina Tanaka
- 7th generation: Koharu Kusumi
- 8th generation: Aika Mitsui, Junjun, Linlin

Shōganai Yume Oibito Vocalists

Main Vocal : Ai Takahashi, Reina Tanaka

Center Vocal : Risa Niigaki

Minor Vocal : Eri Kamei, Sayumi Michishige

3, 2, 1 BREAKIN'OUT Vocalists

Main Vocal : Ai Takahashi, Reina Tanaka

Center Vocal : Sayumi Michishige

== Chart positions ==
Oricon daily and weekly	Mon	Tue	Wed	Thu	Fri	Sat	Sun	Week rank	Sales
Oricon daily and weekly	–	1	5	1	2	5	6	1	47,528
Oricon daily and weekly	4	30	39	32	44	33	31	27	4,106
Oricon daily and weekly	31	–	–	–	–	–	–	81	1,409
Oricon daily and weekly	–	–	–	–	–	–	–	137	591
Oricon daily and weekly	–	–	–	–	–	–	–	191	361
Billboard Japan Hot 100	May 11, 2009 – May 17, 2009								
Billboard Japan Hot 100	#9								
Billboard Japan Hot Singles Sales	May 11, 2009 – May 17, 2009								
Billboard Japan Hot Singles Sales	#1								

Total reported sales: 53,950 (as of June 17, 2009)
