= Nanchatte Ren'ai =

- Regular edition cover

Single by Morning Musume

from the album 10 My Me
- Released: August 12, 2009
- Recorded: 2009
- Genre: J-pop
- Label: Zetima
- Songwriter: Tsunku
- Producer: Tsunku

Morning Musume singles chronology
"Shōganai Yume Oibito" (2009)	"Nanchatte Ren'ai" (2009)	"Kimagure Princess" (2009)

Music video
- Nanchatte Ren'ai on YouTube

"Nanchatte Ren'ai" (なんちゃって恋愛; "Fake Love") is the 40th single release by the Japanese pop girl group Morning Musume. It was released on August 12, 2009, in four versions: regular edition, a 40th single commemorative, and two limited edition versions. The limited editions each contain a different DVD with one of the PVs on it — as well as these, "Nanchatte Ren'ai (Close-up Ver. White)" and "Making of" were included on the Eizō The Morning Musume 4: Single M Clips DVD.

On the August 14, 2009 broadcast of Music Station, original Morning Musume members Yuko Nakazawa, Kaori Iida, Mari Yaguchi, Rika Ishikawa, Hitomi Yoshizawa, Nozomi Tsuji and Asami Konno did a special performance as backing dancers in a collaboration with the current members.

== Contents ==
Being the group's 40th single, "Nanchatte Ren'ai" has a special "40th Anniversary" commemorative release which contains the coupling track "Subete wa Ai no Chikara", a different track than the other releases. The album cover of the commemorative CD features Morning Musume in front of a white background, instead of a red background as featured in the other releases. The regular edition, Limited A and Limited B releases each contain the coupling track "Aki Urara" and each sport different covers. Each release contains the instrumental track of "Nanchatte Ren'ai".

The two limited edition releases of the single both come with a DVD containing alternate versions of the music video for "Nanchatte Ren'ai". The Limited A DVD contains "Nanchatte Ren'ai (Dance Shot Ver.)", a music video consisting completely of Morning Musume performing the dance created for the single. The Limited B DVD contains "Nanchatte Ren'ai (Close-up Ver. Black)", a video consisting completely of solo shots of the members.

== Track listing ==
All tracks are written and composed by Tsunku and arranged by Kaoru Okubo.

=== Regular and limited edition CDs ===
1. "Nanchatte Ren'ai" (なんちゃって恋愛; "Fake Love")
2. "Aki Urara" (秋麗; "Autumn's Beauty")
3. "Nanchatte Ren'ai" (Instrumental)

=== 40th Anniversary CD ===
1. "Nanchatte Ren'ai"
2. "Subete wa Ai no Chikara (すべては愛の力; "The Power of Love is Everything")
3. "Nanchatte Ren'ai" (Instrumental)

=== Limited A DVD ===
1. "Nanchatte Ren'ai" (Dance Shot Ver.)

=== Limited B DVD ===
1. "Nanchatte Ren'ai" (Close-up Ver. Black)

== Featured lineup ==
- 5th generation: Ai Takahashi, Risa Niigaki
- 6th generation: Eri Kamei, Sayumi Michishige, Reina Tanaka
- 7th generation: Koharu Kusumi
- 8th generation: Aika Mitsui, Junjun, Linlin

Nanchatte Ren'ai Vocalists

Main Vocal : Ai Takahashi, Reina Tanaka

Center Vocal : Risa Niigaki, Eri Kamei, Sayumi Michishige, Koharu Kusumi

Minor Vocal : Aika Mitsui, Junjun, Linlin

== Chart positions ==
Oricon
Oricon	Daily (August 16, 2009)
Oricon	#1
Oricon	Weekly (August 11, 2009 – August 18, 2009)
Oricon	#2
Oricon	Monthly (August 2009)
Oricon	#7
Oricon	Total sales
Oricon	70,299; As of September 29, 2009
Billboard Japan Hot 100	August 18, 2009 – August 24, 2009
Billboard Japan Hot 100	#4
Billboard Japan Hot Singles Sales	August 18, 2009 – August 24, 2009
Billboard Japan Hot Singles Sales	#3
