= Only You (Morning Musume song) =

- Regular Edition cover

Single by Morning Musume

from the album 12, Smart
- B-side: "Yamete yo! Sinbad"
- Released: June 15, 2011
- Recorded: 2011
- Genre: J-pop; electropop
- Length: 5:16
- Label: Zetima
- Songwriter: Tsunku
- Producer: Tsunku

Morning Musume singles chronology
"Maji Desu ka Ska!" (2011)	"Only You" (2011)	"Kono Chikyū no Heiwa o Honki de Negatterun Da yo! / Kare to Issho ni Omise ga Shitai!" (2011)

"Only You" is the 46th single by the J-pop group Morning Musume, released on June 15, 2011 on the Zetima label.

== Background ==
"Only You" is the second single to feature the four 9th generation members. The single was released in four versions: a regular edition (catalog number EPCE-5785), and limited editions A, B and C that include a bonus DVD; each edition also sports a different cover. The first press of all editions came with a serial number card, which can be used to enter a draw for tickets to the single's release event. The Single V was released 2 weeks later on June 29. Certain retailers which sold the single, including HMV and Tower Records, also offered a B3 poster to customers who purchased the CD at their shop.

The single was originally due to be released on May 18; however, due to the effects of the earthquake and tsunami, the release was delayed.

The music video was released on the group's official YouTube channel on May 23.

== Members ==
- 5th generation: Ai Takahashi, Risa Niigaki
- 6th generation: Sayumi Michishige, Reina Tanaka
- 8th generation: Aika Mitsui
- 9th generation: Mizuki Fukumura, Erina Ikuta, Riho Sayashi, Kanon Suzuki

Only You Vocalists

Main Voc: Ai Takahashi, Reina Tanaka

Center Voc: Risa Niigaki, Riho Sayashi

Minor Voc: Sayumi Michishige, Aika Mitsui, Mizuki Fukumura, Erina Ikuta

Yamete yo Sinbad! Vocalists

Main Voc: Ai Takahashi, Reina Tanaka

Center Voc: Risa Niigaki, Sayumi Michishige, Aika Mitsui

Minor Voc: Mizuki Fukumura, Erina Ikuta, Riho Sayashi, Kanon Suzuki

== Track listing ==
All tracks are written by Tsunku.

CD
No.	Title	Arranged by	Length
1.	"Only You"	Kaoru Ōkubo
2.	"Yamete yo! Sinbad" (やめてよ！シンドバッド, "Stop it! Sinbad")	Yūsuke Itagaki
3.	"Only You (Instrumental)"

Limited A DVD
No.	Title	Length
1.	"Only You (Dance Shot Ver.)"

Limited B DVD
No.	Title	Length
1.	"Only You (Close-up Ver.)"

Limited С DVD
No.	Title	Length
1.	"Only You (Another Dance Shot Ver.)"

== Charts ==
Chart (2011)	Peak position
Oricon Daily Singles Chart	3
Oricon Weekly Singles Chart	4
Oricon Monthly Singles Chart	17
Billboard Japan Hot 100	12
Billboard Japan Hot Top Airplay	65
Billboard Japan Hot Singles Sales	5
Billboard Japan Adult Contemporary Airplay	62
