= 10 My Me =

Studio album by Morning Musume
- Released: March 17, 2010
- Recorded: 2009
- Genre: Pop; electropop; dance-pop; breakbeat
- Length: 51:29
- Label: Zetima
- Producer: Naoki Yamazaki (Executive producer); Tsunku

Morning Musume chronology
Morning Musume Zen Singles Coupling Collection (2009)	10 My Me (2010)	Fantasy! Jūichi (2010)

Singles from 10 My Me
- 1. "Shōganai Yume Oibito" Released: May 13, 2009; 2. "Nanchatte Ren'ai" Released: August 12, 2009; 3. "Kimagure Princess" Released: October 28, 2009; 4. "Onna ga Medatte Naze Ikenai" Released: February 10, 2010

10 My Me (stylized as ⑩ MY ME) is Japanese pop girl group Morning Musume's tenth studio album. It was released March 17, 2010 in both a regular and limited edition. The normal edition came with a photocard, depicting a similar picture to the limited edition cover. The limited edition was packaged with a bonus DVD and had a different, black cover. The title of the album is a pun: "10 My Me" is read as "Jū-maime" (じゅうまいめ) in Japanese, which literally means "tenth album". The album contains vocals from former member Koharu Kusumi who graduated from the group in December 2009; she is not credited.

== Writing and development ==
On December 30, 2009, along with the announcement of then-forthcoming release of their forty-second single, "Onna ga Medatte Naze Ikenai", it was also announced that the group would be releasing their tenth studio album on March 17, 2010. According to Tsunku, "Genki Pikappika!" was originally chosen as the opening track for the album; however, he felt that "Moonlight Night (Tsukiyo no Ban da yo)" was a better choice. The Chinese version of "Ame no Furanai Hoshi de wa Aisenai Darō?" was included in the album as a chance to give the two Chinese members, Junjun and Linlin, a chance to shine and challenge the other members.

== Singles ==
"Shōganai Yume Oibito" was released as the album's lead single in Japan on May 13, 2009 and topped the Oricon single chart. This became their first number-one single since 2006's "Aruiteru" and extended their record for having the most number-one singles for a female group.

The second single was "Nanchatte Ren'ai", released on August 12, 2009, nearly 3 months after the release of "Shōganai Yume Oibito". It debuted at number-two on the Oricon single chart. This made them the second group to have forty Top 10 singles since their debut after Japanese pop boy band SMAP, who accomplished this feat back in October 2006.

The third single, "Kimagure Princess", was released on October 28, 2009 and would be the last single for Koharu Kusumi, who joined the group as the only seventh generation member in 2005. "Kimagure Princess" debuted at number four on the Oricon charts.

"Onna ga Medatte Naze Ikenai" was the last single from the album, released on February 10, 2010. The single debuted at number five on the charts.

== Promotion ==
In order to promote the album, Morning Musume appeared on various TV shows such as, Samma no Mamma, MuJack, and Waratte Iitomo. The group appeared at a 3D fashion concert and performed their 2000 hit song "Ren'ai Revolution 21". Risa Niigaki and Aika Mitsui also worked part-time as cashiers for two hours at Tower Records in Shibuya on the day of the album's release. The album was further promoted by their spring concert tour, titled Pikappika!, which began on March 19, 2010.

== Track listing ==
All tracks are written by Tsunku except the Chinese lyrics for "Ame no Furanai Hoshi de wa Aisenai Darō?", which were written by Zheng Zhao Ren

CD
No.	Title	Length
1.	"Moonlight Night (Tsukiyo no Ban da yo)" (Moonlight night ～月夜の晩だよ～ "Moonlight Night (It's a Moonlit Night)")	3:42
2.	"Kimagure Princess (気まぐれプリンセス; "Fickle Princess")"	4:18
3.	"Genki Pikappika!" (元気ピカッピカッ! "Sparkling Energy")	4:18
4.	"Namidacchi" (涙ッチ "Tears")	3:38
5.	"Onna ga Medatte Naze Ikenai (女が目立って なぜイケナイ; "Why Can't Women Stand Out?")"	3:53
6.	"Ōkii Hitomi" (大きい瞳 "Big Eyes" Sung by Eri Kamei, Sayumi Michishige, and Reina Tanaka)	4:43
7.	"Ano Hi ni Modoritai" (あの日に戻りたい "I Want to Return to that Day" Sung by Ai Takahashi and Risa Niigaki)	4:33
8.	"Nanchatte Ren'ai (なんちゃって恋愛; "Fake Love")"	4:21
9.	"Osaka Umainen" (大阪 美味いねん "Delicious Osaka" Sung by Aika Mitsui, Junjun, and Linlin)	3:10
10.	"Loving You Forever"	5:03
11.	"Shōganai Yume Oibito (しょうがない 夢追い人; "Helpless Dream Chaser")"	5:04
12.	"Ame no Furanai Hoshi de wa Aisenai Darō? (Chūgoku-go Ver.)" (雨の降らない星では愛せないだろう? (中国語Ver.) "We Can't Love Each Other On a Planet Where No Rain Falls, Can We? (Chinese Ver.)")	4:17

Limited DVD
No.	Title	Length
1.	"Onna ga Medatte Naze Ikenai (Ai Takahashi Solo Ver.)"
2.	"Onna ga Medatte Naze Ikenai (Risa Niigaki Solo Ver.)"
3.	"Onna ga Medatte Naze Ikenai (Eri Kamei Solo Ver.)"
4.	"Onna ga Medatte Naze Ikenai (Sayumi Michishige Solo Ver.)"
5.	"Onna ga Medatte Naze Ikenai (Reina Tanaka Solo Ver.)"
6.	"Onna ga Medatte Naze Ikenai (Aika Mitsui Solo Ver.)"
7.	"Onna ga Medatte Naze Ikenai (Junjun Solo Ver.)"
8.	"Onna ga Medatte Naze Ikenai (Linlin Solo Ver.)"
9.	"Onna ga Medatte Naze Ikenai (Mobekimasu! Live Ver.)" (From Hello! Project 2010 Winter Kachōfūgetsu: Mobekimasu!, filmed January 9, 2010 at Nakano Sun Plaza)
10.	"Album Jacket Photos: Making of" (アルバムジャケット撮影 メイキング)

== Chart performance ==
On the day of its release, 10 My Me debuted at number seven on the Oricon daily chart. At the end of the week, the album debuted at number nine on the weekly chart with 12,103 copies sold.

== Charts ==
Chart (2010)	Peak position
Oricon Daily Chart	7
Oricon Weekly Chart	9
Billboard Japan Top Charts	15

== Personnel ==
- Akiko – Hair & make-up
- Kazuyoshi Araki – A&R
- Yutaka Asahina – Producer's assistant
- Shirohide Azuma – Art direction & design
- Misako Fukuda – Sales promotion
- Shin Hashimoto – Label manager
- Miyuki Ito – Promotion
- Junjun – Vocal
- Koji Kamada – Director
- Eri Kamei – vocal
- Kazuhito Kawata – sales promotion
- Ayaka Kitayama – Producer's assistant
- Shinnosuke Kobayashi – Recording coordination
- Koharu Kusumi (uncredited) – vocal
- Linlin – vocal
- Yasuji Yasman Maeda – Mastering engineer
- Kazumi Matsui – Recording engineer
- Sayumi Michishige – vocal, backing vocal
- Aika Mitsui – vocal
- Shuhei Miyachi – promotion
- Yoji Mochida – Artist producer
- Tomoko Nakamura – promotion
- Risa Niigaki – vocal
- Kōichi Nishikata – Chief producer
- Yusuke Ogawa – Assistant engineer
- Toshiya Ohta – hair & make-up
- Haruka Okayasu – promotion
- Makoto Okuguchi – photographer
- Yuichi Otsubo – recording engineer
- Mitsuhiro Sagara – producer's management
- Hiroharu Saito – hair & make-up
- Yasuhiro Saito – Art direction & design
- Yukina Saito – Management
- Yukio Seto – Label producer
- Maki Shoji – Promotion desk
- Hiromi Sugusawa – Sales promotion desk
- Takauki Suzuki – management
- Ai Takahashi – vocal, backing vocal
- Satoru Takase – Stylist
- Sho Takimoto – art direction & design
- Reina Tanaka – vocal
- Tsunku – Record producer, writer, composer
- Shiina Ueki – A&R coordination desk
- Nobuyasu Umemoto – producer's management
- Ryo Wakizaka – recording engineer
- Chihiro Watanabe – promotion
- Eito Watanabe – hair & make-up
- Atsushi Yamaguchi – assistant engineer
- Naoki Yamazaki – Executive producer
- Takeshi Yanagisawa – recording engineer
- Sayaka Yoshida – promotion desk

== Release history ==
Region	Date	Label	Format	Catalog
Japan	March 17, 2010	Zetima	CD	EPCE-5699
Japan	March 17, 2010	Zetima	CD+DVD	EPCE-5697~8
Taiwan	March 19, 2010	Forward Music	CD	10-20677-1
Taiwan	March 19, 2010	Forward Music	CD+DVD	10-20677
South Korea	March 23, 2010	M.net Media	CD	CMAC-9492
South Korea	March 23, 2010	M.net Media	CD+DVD	CMAC-9491
United States	April 10, 2010	JapanFiles	CD	JF-1021
