= 12, Smart =

Studio album by Morning Musume
- Released: October 12, 2011
- Recorded: 2011
- Genres: J-pop; electropop; dance-pop
- Label: Zetima
- Producer: Tsunku

Morning Musume chronology
Fantasy! Jūichi (2010)	12, Smart (2011)	13 Colorful Character (2012)

Singles from 12, Smart
- 1. "Maji Desu ka Ska!" Released: April 6, 2011; 2. "Only You" Released: June 15, 2011; 3. "Kono Chikyū no Heiwa o Honki de Negatterun Da yo! / Kare to Issho ni Omise ga Shitai!" Released: September 14, 2011

12, Smart (12,スマート, 12, Smart) is the twelfth studio album by Japanese girl group Morning Musume.

== Overview ==
It is the last album to feature Ai Takahashi, Risa Niigaki, and Aika Mitsui and the first to feature the ninth-generation members Mizuki Fukumura, Erina Ikuta, Riho Sayashi, and Kanon Suzuki.

== Track listing ==
All tracks are written by Tsunku.

CD
No.	Title	Arrangement	Length
1.	"Give me Love" (Give me 愛, Read as: Love, not Ai)	Kaoru Okubo	4:57
2.	"Only You"	Kaoru Okubo	5:19
3.	"Silver no Udedokei" (シルバーの腕時計, Silver Wristwatch) (Performed by Reina Tanaka and Riho Sayashi, Rap by Risa Niigaki and Aika Mitsui)	Kaoru Okubo, Rap Arrangement by U.M.E.D.Y	5:50
4.	"Suki da na Kimi ga" (好きだな君が, I Like You) (Performed by Sayumi Michishige and Mizuki Fukumura)	Kaoru Okubo	5:13
5.	"Kaiketsu Positive A" (怪傑ポジティブA, Extraordinary Person Positive A)	Shōichirō Hirata	4:59
6.	"Kono Ai wo Kasanete" (この愛を重ねて, "Growing This Love")	AKIRA	5:10
7.	"Kono Chikyū no Heiwa o Honki de Negatterun Da yo!" (この地球の平和を本気で願ってるんだよ!, "I'm Really Wishing for Peace on Earth!")	Shōichirō Hirata	5:02
8.	"Kare to Issho ni Omise ga Shitai!" (彼と一緒にお店がしたい!, "I Want to Open a Shop with Him!")	Kaoru Okubo	4:51
9.	"My Way ~Joshikō Hanamichi~" (My Way 〜女子校花道〜, My Way ~Girls' School Flower Passageway~)	Shunsuke Suzuki	4:35
10.	"Otome no Timing" (乙女のタイミング, A Girl's Timing) (Performed by Aika Mitsui, Erina Ikuta and Kanon Suzuki)	Yuusuke Itagaki	4:21
11.	"OK YEAH!"	Kaoru Okubo	4:46
12.	"Maji Desu ka Ska!" (まじですかスカ!, Seriously? Ska!)	Masanori Takumi	3:41
Total length:			58:38

DVD
No.	Title	Length
1.	"Kono Chikyū no Heiwa o Honki de Negatterun Da yo! (Ai Takahashi Solo Ver.) Music Video"
2.	"Kono Chikyū no Heiwa o Honki de Negatterun Da yo! (Risa Niigaki Solo Ver.) Music Video"
3.	"Kono Chikyū no Heiwa o Honki de Negatterun Da yo! (Sayumi Michishige Solo Ver.) Music Video"
4.	"Kono Chikyū no Heiwa o Honki de Negatterun Da yo! (Reina Tanaka Solo Ver.) Music Video"
5.	"Kono Chikyū no Heiwa o Honki de Negatterun Da yo! (Aika Mitsui Solo Ver.) Music Video"
6.	"Kono Chikyū no Heiwa o Honki de Negatterun Da yo! (Mizuki Fukumura Solo Ver.) Music Video"
7.	"Kono Chikyū no Heiwa o Honki de Negatterun Da yo! (Erina Ikuta Solo Ver.) Music Video"
8.	"Kono Chikyū no Heiwa o Honki de Negatterun Da yo! (Riho Sayashi Solo Ver.) Music Video"
9.	"Kono Chikyū no Heiwa o Honki de Negatterun Da yo! (Kanon Suzuki Solo Ver.) Music Video"
10.	"Jishin Motte Yume o Motte Tobitatsu Kara / Ai Takahashi (Morning Musume) Music Video"
11.	"Jishin Motte Yume o Motte Tobitatsu Kara / Ai Takahashi (Morning Musume) Music Video : Making of"
12.	"Album Jacket Photo Shoot: Making of"

== Personnel ==
- Kaoru Okubo - Keyboard and Programming (1,2,3,4,8,11)
- Ai Takahashi - Chorus (1,2,3,5,6,7,8,9,10,11,12)
- Risa Niigaki - Chorus (1,6)
- Koji Kamada - Guitar (2,7,8,12), Electric Guitar and Air Guitar (5)
- U.M.E.D.Y - Rap (3)
- Sayumi Michishige - Chorus (4)
- Shōichirō Hirata - Programming (5,7)
- Tsunku - Chorus (5,12)
- AKIRA - Programming (6)
- Shunsuke Suzuki - Programming and Guitar (9)
- Takao Toshiyuki - Drums (9)
- Yuusuke Itagaki - Programming and Guitar (10)
- Masanori Takumi - Programming, Guitar and Bass (12)

== Charts ==
Chart (2011)	Peak position	Weeks on chart	Sales	
Chart (2011)	Peak position	Weeks on chart	First week	Total
Oricon Weekly Albums Chart	8	4	11,389	13,889
Billboard Japan Top Albums	8	2		
