= Morning Musume Zen Single Coupling Collection =

- Regular Edition cover

Compilation album by Morning Musume
- Released: October 7, 2009
- Recorded: 1997–2009
- Genre: J-pop
- Length: 3:02:05
- Label: Zetima
- Producer: Tsunku

Morning Musume chronology
Platinum 9 Disc (2009)	Morning Musume Zen Single Coupling Collection (2009)	10 My Me (2010)

Alternative cover
- Limited Edition Cover

Morning Musume Zen Single Coupling Collection (モーニング娘。 全シングル カップリングコレクション, Mōningu Musume Zen Shinguru Kappuringu Korekushon) is the 5th greatest hits collection released by Japanese girl group Morning Musume. It features every b-side the group has released thus far on their singles in a set of three discs. It was released on October 7, 2009 in both limited (EPCE-5661～3) and regular (EPCE-5664～6) editions. The limited edition has different album art and includes a photobook.

== Track listings ==
All tracks are written by Tsunku unless noted

Disc 1
No.	Title	Length
1.	"Ai no Tane"	4:15
2.	"A Memory of Summer '98"	3:59
3.	"Tatoeba" ("For Instance" (例えば))	4:05
4.	"Happy Night"	5:14
5.	"Never Forget"	4:36
6.	"Koi no Shihatsu Ressha" (恋の始発列車)	4:21
7.	"Wasurerannai" ("I Can't Forget" (忘れらんない))	4:48
8.	"21 Seiki" ("21st Century" (21世紀))	4:50
9.	"Koi wa Rock n' Roll" ("Love is Rock n' Roll" (恋はロケンロー, Koi wa Roken Rō))	5:08
10.	"Tsūgaku Ressha" (通学列車)	4:31
11.	"Akogare My Boy" (あこがれ My Boy)	5:29
12.	"Inspiration!" (Insupirēshon (インスピレーション!))	4:18
13.	"Dekkai Uchū ni Ai ga Aru" ("There's Love In This Big Universe" (でっかい宇宙に愛がある))	5:58
14.	"Popcorn Love!" (Poppukōn Rabu! (ポップコーンラブ!))	4:44

Disc 2
No.	Title	Length
1.	"Morning Coffee (2002 version)"	4:32
2.	"Chotto Ikashita Pure Boy" (ちょっとイカした Pure Boy)	4:07
3.	"Jun Lover" ("Pure Lover" (純LOVER))	4:38
4.	"Hōsekibako" ("Jewelry Box" (宝石箱))	4:05
5.	"Never Forget (Rock Ver.)"	4:18
6.	"Namida ni wa Shitakunai" (涙にはしたくない)	4:06
7.	"Koi Ing" ("Loving" (恋 ING))	5:24
8.	"Dekiru Onna" (出来る女)	3:14
9.	"Fine Emotion!" (Fain Emōshon (ファインエモーション!!))	3:46
10.	"Ganbare Nippon Soccer Fight!" (Ganbare Nippon Sakkā Faito! (がんばれ 日本 サッカー ファイト!))	4:04
11.	"Nebō desu. Date na no Ni..." (Nebō desu. Dēto na no Ni... (寝坊です｡ デートなのに…))	4:48
12.	"Love & Peace! Hero ga Yattekita." ("Love & Peace! The Hero Has Come." (ラヴ & ピィ～ス!HEROがやって来たっ｡))	3:39
13.	"Nature is Good!"	3:09
14.	"Ai to Taiyō ni Tsutsumarete" (愛と太陽に包まれて)	5:02

Disc 3
No.	Title	Length
1.	"Koi wa Hassō Do the Hustle!"	4:15
2.	"Chance Chance Boogie" (Chansu Chansu Bugi (チャンス チャンス ブギ))	2:51
3.	"Watashi ga Tsuiteru." (わたしがついてる｡)	4:00
4.	"Odore! Morning Curry" ("Dance! Morning Curry" (踊れ! モーニングカレー, Odore! Mōningu Kare))	3:49
5.	"Sayonara no Kawari Ni" ("Instead of a Good-bye")	4:40
6.	"Hand Made City"	4:46
7.	"Please! Jiyū no Tobira" ("'Please! Freedom Door" (Please! 自由の扉))	4:07
8.	"Bon Kyu! Bon Kyu! Bomb Girl" (ボン キュッ! ボン キュッ! BOMB GIRL)	3:16
9.	"Sono Bamen de Bibiccha Ikenai Jan!" (その場面でビビっちゃいけないじゃん!)	4:36
10.	"Romance" (Romansu (ロマンス))	3:43
11.	"Yowamushi" ("Coward" (弱虫))	4:50
12.	"3, 2, 1 Breakin' Out"	4:36
13.	"Aki Urara" ("Autumn Beauty" (秋麗))	4:07
14.	"Subete wa Ai no Chikara" ("Everything Is The Power Of Love" (すべては愛の力))	3:40
