= Onna ga Medatte Naze Ikenai =

Single by Morning Musume

from the album 10 My Me
- B-side: "Nakidasu Kamo Shirenai yo"
- Released: February 10, 2010; February 24, 2010 (Single V)
- Recorded: 2009
- Genre: J-pop; dance-pop; electropop
- Length: 12:11
- Label: Zetima
- Songwriter: Tsunku
- Producer: Tsunku

Morning Musume singles chronology
"Kimagure Princess" (2009)	"Onna ga Medatte Naze Ikenai" (2010)	"Seishun Collection" (2010)

Music video
- "Onna ga Medatte Naze Ikenai" on YouTube

"Onna ga Medatte Naze Ikenai" (女が目立って なぜイケナイ; "Why Can't Women Stand Out?") is the 42nd single by Hello! Project unit Morning Musume. The single was released on February 10, 2010 with three limited edition releases as well as the normal edition– "A", "B" and "C"– all of which contained a different DVD. All four editions (including normal) also contained a special card with a serial number on it, which was used in an event draw. The Single V was released on February 24, 2010. This is also the group's first single as an eight-member unit, since the graduation of seventh generation member Koharu Kusumi in late 2009.

The theme of the title track is a comparison between women and flowers.

== Track listings ==
=== CD ===
1. "Onna ga Medatte Naze Ikenai" (女が目立って なぜイケナイ; "Why Can't Women Stand Out?")
  - Programming: Hideyuki "Daichi" Suzuki / Drums: Toshiyuki Takao / Violin: Crusher Kimura / E. guitar & A. guitar: Koji Kamada / Chorus: Ai Takahashi
2. "Nakidasu Kamo Shirenai yo" (泣き出すかもしれないよ; "I Might Cry Out")
  - Programming & guitar: AKIRA / Chorus: Ai Takahashi, Eri Kamei
3. "Onna ga Medatte Naze Ikenai (Instrumental)"

=== DVD ===
==== Limited A ====
1. "Onna ga Medatte Naze Ikenai (Dance Shot Ver.)"

==== Limited B ====
1. "Onna ga Medatte Naze Ikenai (Close-up Ver.)"

==== Limited C ====
1. "Onna ga Medatte Naze Ikenai (Make-up Ver.)"

=== Single V ===
1. "Onna ga Medatte Naze Ikenai"
2. "Onna ga Medatte Naze Ikenai (Stage Ver.)"
3. "Making Of" (メイキング映像, Meikingu Eizō)

== Featured lineup ==
- 5th generation: Ai Takahashi, Risa Niigaki
- 6th generation: Eri Kamei, Sayumi Michishige, Reina Tanaka
- 8th generation: Aika Mitsui, Junjun, Linlin

Onna ga Medatte Naze Ikenai

Main Voc: Ai Takahashi, Reina Tanaka

Center Voc: Risa Niigaki, Eri Kamei

Minor Voc: Sayumi Michishige, Aika Mitsui, Junjun, Linlin

Nakidasu Kamo Shirenai yo

Main Voc: Ai Takahashi, Risa Niigaki, Eri Kamei, Reina Tanaka

Center Voc: Junjun

Minor Voc: Sayumi Michishige, Aika Mitsui, Linlin

== Chart positions ==
Oricon
Oricon	Daily (February 9, 2010)
Oricon	#2
Oricon	Weekly (February 9, 2010 – February 17, 2010)
Oricon	#5
Oricon	Monthly (February 2010)
Oricon	#11
Oricon	Total sales
Oricon	36,169; As of February 17, 2010
Billboard Japan Hot 100	February 16, 2010 – February 22, 2010
Billboard Japan Hot 100	#16
Billboard Japan Hot Singles Sales	February 16, 2010 – February 22, 2010
Billboard Japan Hot Singles Sales	#6
