= Seishun Collection =

- Normal edition cover

Single by Morning Musume

from the album Fantasy! Jūichi
- B-side: "Tomo"
- Released: June 9, 2010
- Recorded: 2010
- Genre: J-pop
- Length: 4:40
- Label: Zetima
- Songwriter: Tsunku
- Producer: Tsunku

Morning Musume singles chronology
"Onna ga Medatte Naze Ikenai" (2010)	"Seishun Collection" (2010)	"Appare Kaitenzushi!" (2010)

Music video
- Seishun Collection on YouTube

"Seishun Collection" (青春コレクション, Seishun Korekushon; "Youth Collection") is a song recorded by Japanese pop girl group Morning Musume. Written and produced by Tsunku, it was released on June 9, 2010 by Zetima in four editions: the normal edition and limited A, B, and C versions. The limited editions each contain a different version of the promotional video.

== Promotion ==
"Seishun Collection" is the theme song for Fashionable (ファッショナブル, Fasshonaburu), a musical starring Morning Musume. The b-side "Tomo" (友, "Friend") was chosen as the theme song for the 2010 Japan Expo in Paris, France, at which Morning Musume is expected to appear on July 2, 2010.

The group appeared on Music Japan, alongside other female idol groups, and performed "Seishun Collection".

Also at Morning Musume Concert Tour 2011 Aki ~Takahashi Ai Graduation~, Morning Musume and their 10th generation, Ikubo Haruna, Ishida Ayumi, Masaki Sato and Kudo Haruka performed together Morning Musume 43rd single, Seishun Collection's B-side Tomo.

== Track listing ==
All tracks are written by Tsunku.

CD
No.	Title	Arranger	Length
1.	"Seishun Collection" (青春コレクション "Youth Collection")	Kaoru Okubo	4:40
2.	"Tomo" (友 "Friend")	Akira	4:49
3.	"Seishun Collection (Instrumental)"	Okubo	4:40
Total length:			14:17

Limited Edition DVD A
No.	Title	Length
1.	"Seishun Collection (Dance Shot Ver.)"

Limited Edition DVD B
No.	Title	Length
1.	"Seishun Collection (Close-Up Ver.)"

Limited Edition DVD C
No.	Title	Length
1.	"Seishun Collection (Seishun Ver. (Type 1))"

Single V
No.	Title	Length
1.	"Seishun Collection"
2.	"Seishun Collection (Seishun Ver. (Type 2))"
3.	"Making Eizō (メイキング映像, Meikingu Eizō; Making Of)"

Event V
No.	Title	Length
1.	"Seishun Collection (Ai Takahashi Solo Ver.)"
2.	"Seishun Collection (Risa Niigaki Solo Ver.)"
3.	"Seishun Collection (Eri Kamei Solo Ver.)"
4.	"Seishun Collection (Sayumi Michishige Solo Ver.)"
5.	"Seishun Collection (Reina Tanaka Solo Ver.)"
6.	"Seishun Collection (Aika Mitsui Solo Ver.)"
7.	"Seishun Collection (Junjun Solo Ver.)"
8.	"Seishun Collection (Linlin Solo Ver.)"

== Charts ==
Chart (2010)	Peak position
Japan Hot 100 (Billboard)	13
Japan Daily Chart (Oricon)	1
Japan Weekly Chart (Oricon)	3
Japan Monthly Chart (Oricon)	12

== Members ==
- 5th generation: Ai Takahashi, Risa Niigaki
- 6th generation: Eri Kamei, Sayumi Michishige, Reina Tanaka
- 8th generation: Aika Mitsui, Junjun, Linlin

Seishun Collection

Main Voc: Ai Takahashi, Risa Niigaki, Eri Kamei, Reina Tanaka

Center Voc: Sayumi Michishige

Minor Voc: Aika Mitsui, Junjun, Linlin

Tomo

Main Voc: Ai Takahashi, Reina Tanaka

Center Voc: Risa Niigaki, Eri Kamei, Sayumi Michishige, Aika Mitsui, Junjun, Linlin
