= First Squeeze! =

Studio album by Juice=Juice
- Released: July 15, 2015 (JP)
- Genre: J-pop; synthpop; electropop; dance-pop
- Label: Hachama
- Producer: Tsunku

Juice=Juice chronology
First Squeeze! (2015)	#2 ¡Una mas! (2018)

Singles from First Squeeze!
- 1. "Ten Made Nobore!" Released: June 8, 2013; 2. "Romance no Tochū / Watashi ga Iu Mae ni Dakishimenakya ne (Memorial Edit) / Samidare Bijo ga Samidareru (Memorial Edit)" Released: September 11, 2013; 3. "Ijiwaru Shinaide Dakishimete yo / Hajimete wo Keikenchū" Released: December 4, 2013; 4. "Hadaka no Hadaka no Hadaka no Kiss / Are Kore Shitai!" Released: March 19, 2014; 5. "Black Butterfly / Kaze ni Fukarete" Released: July 30, 2014; 6. "Senobi / Date ja Nai yo Uchi no Jinsei wa" Released: October 1, 2014; 7. "Wonderful World / Ça va? Ça va?" Released: April 8, 2015

First Squeeze! is the first studio album by Japanese girl idol group Juice=Juice. It was released on 15 July 2015 on the label Hachama.

== Release ==
The album was released in three versions: a regular edition and two limited editions (Limited Edition A and Limited Edition B). The Limited Edition A included an additional Blu-ray disc, while the Limited Edition B included an additional DVD.

== Chart performance ==
The album debuted at number 5 in the Japanese Oricon weekly albums chart.

== Track listing ==
CD1 "The Best Juice"
No.	Title	Notes	Length
1.	"Ten made Nobore!" (天まで登れ！)	B-side of the 3rd indie single
2.	"Romance no Tochū" (ロマンスの途中)	First A-side of the 1st major-label single
3.	"Watashi ga Iu Mae ni Dakishimenakya ne (Memorial Edit)" (私が言う前に抱きしめなきゃね（MEMORIAL EDIT）)	Second A-side of the 1st major-label single, a new version of the title track from the 1st indie single "Watashi ga Iu Mae ni Dakishimenakya ne"
4.	"Samidare Bijo ga Samidareru (Memorial Edit)" (五月雨美女がさ乱れる（MEMORIAL EDIT）)	Third A-side of the 1st major-label single, a new version of the title track from the 2nd indie single "Samidare Bijo ga Samidareru"
5.	"Ijiwaru Shinaide Dakishimete yo" (イジワルしないで 抱きしめてよ)	First A-side of the 2nd major-label single
6.	"Hajimete wo Keikenchū" (初めてを経験中)	Second A-side of the 2nd major-label single
7.	"Hadaka no Hadaka no Hadaka no Kiss" (裸の裸の裸のKISS)	First A-side of the 3rd major-label single
8.	"Are Kore Shitai!" (アレコレしたい！)	Second A-side of the 3rd major-label single
9.	"Black Butterfly" (ブラックバタフライ)	First A-side of the 4th major-label single
10.	"Kaze ni Fukarete" (風に吹かれて)	Second A-side of the 4th major-label single
11.	"Senobi" (背伸び)	First A-side of the 5th major-label single
12.	"Date ja Nai yo Uchi no Jinsei wa" (伊達じゃないよ うちの人生は)	Second A-side of the 5th major-label single

CD2 "The Brand-New Juice"
No.	Title	Notes	Length
1.	"Wonderful World"	First A-side of the 6th major-label single
2.	"Choice & Chance" (CHOICE&CHANCE)
3.	"Ai・Ai・Gasa" (愛・愛・傘)
4.	"Umaretate no Baby Love" (生まれたてのBaby Love)
5.	"Erabareshi Watashitachi" (選ばれし私達)
6.	"Ça va? Ça va?" (Ça va ? Ça va ?（サヴァ サヴァ）)	Second A-side of the 6th major-label single
7.	"Girls Be Ambitious" (GIRLS BE AMBITIOUS)
8.	"Ai no Diving" (愛のダイビング)
9.	"Tick-Tock Watashi no Shun" (チクタク 私の旬)
10.	"Mirai e, Sā Hashiridase!" (未来へ、さあ走り出せ！)
11.	"Tsuzuiteiku Story" (続いていくSTORY)

CD3 "The Cover Juice"
No.	Title	Notes and artist(s)	Length
1.	"Magic of Love (J=J 2015 Ver.)" (Magic of Love（J=J 2015Ver.）)	Cover version of the same song by Taiyō to Ciscomoon
2.	"Kōsui (J=J 2015 Ver.)" (香水（J=J 2015Ver.）)	Cover version of the same song by Melon Kinenbi
3.	"Narihajimeta Koi no Bell" (鳴り始めた恋のBELL)	Cover version of the same song by Ongaku Gatas
4.	"Scramble" (スクランブル)	Cover version of the same song by Maki Gotō
5.	"Baby! Koi ni Knock Out!" (BABY! 恋にKNOCK OUT!≪宮崎由加&金澤朋子&植村あかり≫)	Cover version of the same song by Petitmoni; Sung by Yuka Miyazaki, Akari Uemura, Tomoko Kanazawa
6.	"Last Kiss" (ラストキッス≪高木紗友希&宮本佳林≫)	Cover version of the same song by Tanpopo; Sung by Sayuki Takagi and Karin Miyamoto

Blu-ray disc (comes only with the Limited Edition A)
No.	Title	Length
1.	"(Tracks 1–30.) MV Clips Collection" (MV クリップス集)

DVD (comes only with the Limited Edition B)
No.	Title	Length
1.	"(Tracks 1–32.) 4/25 Sapporo Live" (4/25 札幌ライブ)

== Charts ==
Chart (2015)	Peak position
Japan (Oricon Weekly Albums Chart)	5
