= Romance no Tochū / Watashi ga Iu Mae ni Dakishimenakya ne (Memorial Edit) / Samidare Bijo ga Samidareru (Memorial Edit) =

"Romance no Tochū"

Single by Juice=Juice

from the album First Squeeze!
- Released: September 11, 2013
- Recorded: 2013
- Label: hachama
- Songwriter: Tsunku
- Producer: Tsunku

Juice=Juice singles chronology
"Ten Made Nobore!" (2013)	"Romance no Tochū" (2013)	"Ijiwaru Shinaide Dakishimete yo/Hajimete wo Keiken-chuu" (2013)

Music video
- Romance is on its way on YouTube

Romance no Tochū (ロマンスの途中, Romansu no Tochū) is Juice=Juice's major debut single. The single was released on September 11, 2013 in 6 editions: a regular and 5 limited editions. The single was originally planned to be released as a single A-side titled "Romance no Tochū", but due to Aina Otsuka's departure, it was later decided to release it as a triple A-side. It debuted in 2nd place on the weekly Oricon Singles Chart.

== CD ==
1. Romance no Tochū
2. Watashi ga Iu Mae ni Dakishimenakya ne (MEMORIAL EDIT)
3. Samidare Bijo ga Samidareru (MEMORIAL EDIT)
4. Romance no Tochuu -Instrumental-
5. Watashi ga Iu Mae ni Dakishimenakya ne (MEMORIAL EDIT) -Instrumental-
6. Samidare Bijo ga Samidareru (MEMORIAL EDIT) -Instrumental-

== Limited Edition A DVD ==
1. Romance no Tochuu -Music Video-
2. Romance no Tochuu -Dance Shot Ver.-

== Limited Edition B DVD ==
1. Watashi ga Iu Mae ni Dakishimenakya ne (MEMORIAL EDIT) -Music Video-
2. Watashi ga Iu Mae ni Dakishimenakya ne (MEMORIAL EDIT) -Dance Shot Ver.-

== Limited Edition C DVD ==
1. Samidare Bijo ga Samidareru (MEMORIAL EDIT) -Music Video-
2. Samidare Bijo ga Samidareru (MEMORIAL EDIT) -Dance Shot Ver.-

== Limited Edition D DVD ==
1. Watashi ga Iu Mae ni Dakishimenakya ne (MEMORIAL EDIT) -Close-Up Ver.-
2. Watashi ga Iu Mae ni Dakishimenakya ne (MEMORIAL EDIT) -Dance Shot Ver.II-

== Limited Edition E DVD ==
1. Samidare Bijo ga Samidareru (MEMORIAL EDIT) -Close-Up Ver.-
2. Samidare Bijo ga Samidareru (MEMORIAL EDIT) -Dance Shot Ver.II-

== Featured Members ==
- Yuka Miyazaki
- Tomoko Kanazawa
- Sayuki Takagi
- Karin Miyamoto
- Akari Uemura

== Single Information ==
Romance no Tochuu

- Lyrics, Composition: Tsunku
- Arrangement: Shunsuke Suzuki
- Main Vocals: Karin Miyamoto
- Sub Vocal: Sayuki Takagi, Tomoko Kanazawa
- Minor Vocals: Akari Uemura, Yuka Miyazaki
