= Hello Pro Kenshusei =

Pre-debut training group

- Also known as: Hello Pro Egg (ハロプロエッグ) (2004-2012)
- Origin: Japan
- Genres: J-pop
- Years active: 2004–present
- Label: Up-Front Promotion
- Spinoffs: The Possible; Smileage; Juice=Juice; Country Girls; Magnolia Factory; Camellia Factory; Beyooooonds; Ocha Norma; Rosy Chronicle
- Website: www.helloproject.com/helloprokenshusei/

Hello Pro Kenshusei (ハロプロ研修生, Haro Puro Kenshūsei; lit. "Hello Pro Trainees"), formerly known as Hello Pro Egg (ハロプロエッグ) until January 2012, is a pre-debut training group established by Japanese entertainment agency Up-Front Group within Hello! Project in 2004.

The group released several charting albums under its name in the late 2010s and 2020s, all on the Up-Front Indies record label.

== Members ==
Name	Birth date	Age	Join date	Generation	Notes
Hikari Yoshida	October 1, 2011	14	February 7, 2024	36	
Rua Hattori	February 7, 2013	13	February 7, 2024	36	Former Founding Member of Hamu!STAR and DIANNA Project Renshuusei
Aoi Sakamoto	April 7, 2013	13	February 5, 2025	37	
Karin Nemoto	March 22, 2014	12	February 5, 2025	37	
Riho Miyazaki	May 13, 2014	12	February 5, 2025	37	
Airi Ohno	June 25, 2014	12	February 5, 2025	37	
Aika Higuchi	September 3, 2014	11	February 5, 2025	37	
Sara Someya	February 12, 2015	11	February 5, 2025	37	
Yuna Aoki	January 7, 2014	12	May 28, 2025	37	Former Member of FairyDOLL Osaka
Kotomi Suzuki	May 9, 2011	15	April 1, 2026	38	
Yurika Saito	July 5, 2012	14	April 1, 2026	38	
Momoka Kishida	March 8, 2014	12	April 1, 2026	38	
Nana Tamura	July 3, 2014	12	April 1, 2026	38	
Riina Nagai	September 18, 2014	11	April 1, 2026	38	
Shiori Sakata	November 4, 2014	11	April 1, 2026	38	
Ayane Sato	February 12, 2015	11	April 1, 2026	38	
Sara Karibe	March 16, 2015	11	April 1, 2026	38	
Shiharu Saeki	March 27, 2015	11	April 1, 2026	38	
Hana Yamamoto	November 2, 2012	13	June 10, 2026	38	

=== Hello Pro Kenshusei Hokkaido members ===
- none

== Former members ==
=== Debuted members ===
Stage name	Join date	Debut group	Debut date
Yui Okada (岡田唯)	June 20, 2004	v-u-den	August 10, 2004
Kanna Arihara (有原栞菜)	June 20, 2004	Cute	January 2, 2006
Linlin (リンリン)	January 2, 2007	Morning Musume	March 15, 2007
Mizuki Fukumura (譜久村聖)	June 22, 2008	Morning Musume	January 2, 2011
Haruka Kudo (工藤遥)	March 27, 2010	Morning Musume	September 29, 2011
Sakura Oda (小田さくら)	November 12, 2010	Morning Musume	September 14, 2012
Maria Makino (牧野真莉愛)	November 20, 2012	Morning Musume	September 30, 2014
Akane Haga (羽賀朱音)	September 22, 2013	Morning Musume	September 30, 2014
Kaede Kaga (加賀楓)	November 20, 2012	Morning Musume	December 12, 2016
Reina Yokoyama (横山玲奈)	August 17, 2016	Morning Musume	December 12, 2016
Mei Yamazaki (山﨑愛生)	July 16, 2016	Morning Musume	June 22, 2019
Meisa Sugihara (杉原明紗)	February 7, 2024	Morning Musume	March 20, 2026
Hanano Ishikawa (石川華望)	February 5, 2025	Morning Musume	May 28, 2026
Moa Suzuki (鈴木もあ)	February 5, 2025	Morning Musume	June 2, 2026
Kanami Morozuka (諸塚香奈実)	June 20, 2004	The Possible	October 7, 2007
Kaede Ohse (大瀬楓)	June 20, 2004	The Possible	October 7, 2007
Aina Hashimoto (橋本愛奈)	June 20, 2004	The Possible	October 7, 2007
Yurika Akiyama (秋山ゆりか)	June 20, 2004	The Possible	October 7, 2007
Robin Shouko Okada (岡田ロビン翔子)	June 20, 2004	The Possible	October 7, 2007
Yuki Goto (後藤夕貴)	June 20, 2004	The Possible	October 7, 2007
Miki Korenaga (是永美記)	June 20, 2004	Soloist	January 27, 2008
Erina Mano (真野恵里菜)	June 4, 2006	Soloist	March 29, 2008
Ayaka Wada (和田彩花)	June 20, 2004	S/mileage (name changed to Angerme as of December 14, 2014)	March 27, 2010
Yuuka Maeda (前田憂佳)	June 20, 2004	S/mileage (name changed to Angerme as of December 14, 2014)	March 27, 2010
Kanon Fukuda (福田花音)	June 20, 2004	S/mileage (name changed to Angerme as of December 14, 2014)	March 27, 2010
Saki Ogawa (小川紗季)	June 20, 2004	S/mileage (name changed to Angerme as of December 14, 2014)	March 27, 2010
Akari Takeuchi (竹内朱莉)	June 22, 2008	S/mileage (name changed to Angerme as of December 14, 2014)	August 14, 2011
Rina Katsuta (勝田里奈)	June 7, 2009	S/mileage (name changed to Angerme as of December 14, 2014)	August 14, 2011
Mizuki Murota (室田瑞希)	March 31, 2012	S/mileage (name changed to Angerme as of December 14, 2014)	October 4, 2014
Rikako Sasaki (佐々木莉佳子)	March 1, 2013	S/mileage (name changed to Angerme as of December 14, 2014)	October 4, 2014
Maho Aikawa (相川茉穂)	April 1, 2014	S/mileage (name changed to Angerme as of December 14, 2014)	October 4, 2014
Momona Kasahara (笠原桃奈)	April 1, 2015	S/mileage (name changed to Angerme as of December 14, 2014)	July 16, 2016
Ayano Kawamura (川村文乃)	August 17, 2016	S/mileage (name changed to Angerme as of December 14, 2014)	June 26, 2017
Haruka Oota (太田遥香)	July 16, 2016	S/mileage (name changed to Angerme as of December 14, 2014)	November 23, 2018
Rin Hashisako (橋迫鈴)	August 17, 2016	S/mileage (name changed to Angerme as of December 14, 2014)	July 3, 2019
Shion Tamenaga (為永幸音)	December 10, 2017	S/mileage (name changed to Angerme as of December 14, 2014)	November 2, 2020
Yuki Hirayama (平山遊季)	August 2, 2019	S/mileage (name changed to Angerme as of December 14, 2014)	December 30, 2021
Yukiho Shimoitani (下井谷幸穂)	August 8, 2022	S/mileage (name changed to Angerme as of December 14, 2014)	May 23, 2023
Hana Goto (後藤花)	February 14, 2022	S/mileage (name changed to Angerme as of December 14, 2014)	May 23, 2023
Momoha Nagano (長野桃羽)	February 5, 2025	S/mileage (name changed to Angerme as of December 14, 2014)	August 16, 2025
Saki Mori (森咲樹)	June 20, 2004	Up Up Girls Kakko Kari	January 2011
Konatsu Furukawa (古川小夏)	June 20, 2004	Up Up Girls Kakko Kari	January 2011
Azusa Sekine (関根梓)	June 20, 2004	Up Up Girls Kakko Kari	March 3, 2011
Manami Arai (新井愛瞳)	June 20, 2004	Up Up Girls Kakko Kari	March 3, 2011
Ayano Sato (佐藤綾乃)	March 1, 2009	Up Up Girls Kakko Kari	March 3, 2011
Akari Saho (佐保明梨)	June 20, 2004	Up Up Girls Kakko Kari	April 2, 2011
Karin Miyamoto (宮本佳林)	November 24, 2008	Juice=Juice	September 11, 2013
Sayuki Takagi (高木紗友希)	November 23, 2009	Juice=Juice	September 11, 2013
Aina Otsuka (大塚愛菜)	June 20, 2011	Juice=Juice	September 11, 2013
Akari Uemura (植村あかり)	January 11, 2012	Juice=Juice	September 11, 2013
Tomoko Kanazawa (金澤朋子)	November 20, 2012	Juice=Juice	September 11, 2013
Ruru Dambara (段原瑠々)	September 22, 2013	Juice=Juice	June 26, 2017
Yume Kudo (工藤由愛)	July 16, 2016	Juice=Juice	June 14, 2019
Riai Matsunaga (松永里愛)	March 6, 2017	Juice=Juice	June 14, 2019
Kisaki Ebata (江端妃咲)	August 2, 2019	Juice=Juice	July 7, 2021
Ichika Arisawa (有澤一華)	November 4, 2020	Juice=Juice	July 7, 2021
Sakura Ishiyama (石山咲良)	November 4, 2020	Juice=Juice	June 29, 2022
Mifu Kawashima (川嶋美楓)	August 23, 2021	Juice=Juice	May 23, 2023
Niina Hayashi (林仁愛)	March 28, 2023	Juice=Juice	June 23, 2025
Manaka Inaba (稲場愛香)	May 5, 2013	Country Girls	March 25, 2015
Risa Yamaki (山木梨沙)	September 22, 2013	Country Girls	March 25, 2015
Musubu Funaki (船木結)	September 22, 2013	Country Girls	November 5, 2015
Nanami Yanagawa (梁川奈々美)	April 1, 2015	Country Girls	November 5, 2015
Ayano Hamaura (浜浦彩乃)	February 2, 2011	Magnolia Factory	September 2, 2015
Natsumi Taguchi (田口夏実)	February 2, 2011	Magnolia Factory	September 2, 2015
Rena Ogawa (小川麗奈)	June 20, 2011	Magnolia Factory	September 2, 2015
Minami Nomura (野村みな美)	June 17, 2012	Magnolia Factory	September 2, 2015
Sakurako Wada (和田桜子)	November 20, 2012	Magnolia Factory	September 2, 2015
Rio Fujii (藤井梨央)	May 5, 2013	Magnolia Factory	September 2, 2015
Ayaka Hirose (廣瀬彩海)	November 29, 2014	Magnolia Factory	September 2, 2015
Rei Inoue (井上玲音)	November 29, 2014	Magnolia Factory	September 2, 2015
Riko Yamagishi (山岸理子)	June 17, 2012	Camellia Factory	February 22, 2017
Yumeno Kishimoto (岸本ゆめの)	November 20, 2012	Camellia Factory	February 22, 2017
Kisora Niinuma (新沼希空)	September 22, 2013	Camellia Factory	February 22, 2017
Kiki Asakura (浅倉樹々)	October 25, 2014	Camellia Factory	February 22, 2017
Saori Onoda (小野田紗栞)	October 25, 2014	Camellia Factory	February 22, 2017
Risa Ogata (小片リサ)	November 2014	Camellia Factory	February 22, 2017
Ami Tanimoto (谷本安美)	November 2014	Camellia Factory	February 22, 2017
Mizuho Ono (小野瑞歩)	April 1, 2015	Camellia Factory	February 22, 2017
Mao Akiyama (秋山眞緒)	April 1, 2015	Camellia Factory	February 22, 2017
Runo Yofu (豫風瑠乃)	August 2, 2019	Camellia Factory	July 7, 2021
Itsuki Nishimura (西村乙輝)	February 7, 2024	Camellia Factory	August 16, 2025
Reina Ichioka (一岡怜奈)	November 20, 2012	Beyooooonds (Chica#Tetsu)	August 7, 2019
Shiori Nishida (西田汐里)	August 17, 2016	Beyooooonds (Chica#Tetsu)	August 7, 2019
Rika Shimakura (島倉りか)	March 6, 2017	Beyooooonds (Chica#Tetsu)	August 7, 2019
Saya Eguchi (江口紗耶)	March 6, 2017	Beyooooonds (Chica#Tetsu)	August 7, 2019
Mano Otsubo (大坪茉乃)	February 7, 2024	Beyooooonds (Chica#Tetsu)	June 4, 2026
Kurumi Takase (高瀬くるみ)	March 2015	Beyooooonds (Rain Forest River Ocean)	August 7, 2019
Kokoro Maeda (前田こころ)	April 1, 2015	Beyooooonds (Rain Forest River Ocean)	August 7, 2019
Momohime Kiyono (清野桃々姫)	January 15, 2016	Beyooooonds (Rain Forest River Ocean)	August 7, 2019
Yuhane Yamazaki (山﨑夢羽)	August 17, 2016	Beyooooonds (Rain Forest River Ocean)	August 7, 2019
Minami Okamura (岡村美波)	March 6, 2017	Beyooooonds (Rain Forest River Ocean)	August 7, 2019
Kirara Yonemura (米村姫良々)	January 15, 2016	Ocha Norma	December 13, 2021
Kanami Ishiguri (石栗奏美)	July 16, 2016	Ocha Norma	December 13, 2021
Natsume Nakayama (中山夏月姫)	March 6, 2017	Ocha Norma	December 13, 2021
Nanami Kubota (窪田七海)	December 4, 2017	Ocha Norma	December 13, 2021
Madoka Saito (斉藤円香)	December 2, 2018	Ocha Norma	December 13, 2021
Ruli Hiromoto (広本瑠璃)	August 2, 2019	Ocha Norma	December 13, 2021
Miku Nishizaki (西﨑美空)	August 2, 2019	Ocha Norma	December 13, 2021
Momo Kitahara (北原もも)	August 2, 2019	Ocha Norma	December 13, 2021
Yulia Matsubara (松原ユリヤ)	December 4, 2017	Rosy Chronicle	July 13, 2024
Karin Onoda (小野田華凛)	December 2, 2018	Rosy Chronicle	July 13, 2024
Honoka Hashida (橋田歩果)	August 2, 2019	Rosy Chronicle	July 13, 2024
Ayana Murakoshi (村越彩菜)	August 2, 2019	Rosy Chronicle	July 13, 2024
Hasumi Uemura (植村葉純)	August 2, 2019	Rosy Chronicle	July 13, 2024
Hinoha Yoshida (吉田姫杷)	August 23, 2021	Rosy Chronicle	July 13, 2024
Rena Kamimura (上村麗菜)	August 8, 2022	Rosy Chronicle	July 13, 2024
Hana Shimakawa (島川波菜)	February 7, 2024	Rosy Chronicle	July 13, 2024
Yume Soma (相馬優芽)	February 7, 2024	Rosy Chronicle	July 13, 2024

=== Past members ===
Stage name	Date introduced	Date left	Notes
Maho Ooyanagi (大柳まほ)	June 20, 2004	August 30, 2005	Graduated
Miyuki Kawashima (川島幸)	June 20, 2004	September 14, 2005	Member of Gatas Brilhantes H.P.
Mirei Hashida (橋田三令)	June 20, 2004	June 10, 2007	Graduated
Manami Ogura (小倉愛実)	June 20, 2004	August 7, 2007	Graduated
Ayumi Yutoku (湯徳歩美)	June 20, 2004	November 30, 2007	Graduated
Mika Muto (武藤水華)	June 20, 2004	April 30, 2008	Graduated
Erina Aoki (青木英里奈)	June 20, 2004	February 1, 2009	Graduated
Azusa Sezaki (瀬崎あずさ)	April 4, 2009	May 12, 2009	
Yuri Sawada (澤田由梨)	June 20, 2004	August 10, 2009	Graduated
Arisa Noto (能登有沙)	June 20, 2004	September 23, 2009	After graduating, Noto signed with Style Cube and became a voice actress and motion capture artist.
Anri Tanaka (田中杏里)	June 20, 2004	June 12, 2010	
Mia Sainen (西念未彩)	June 20, 2004	June 12, 2010	
Momoka Komine (古峰桃香)	June 4, 2006	June 12, 2010	
Asuna Okai (岡井明日菜)	June 20, 2004	November 28, 2010	
Irori Maeda (澤田由梨)	June 20, 2004	November 28, 2010	She was a member of Shugo Chara Egg! as Amulet Clover after Kanon Fukuda left the group. After leaving Hello! Project, she joined AKBN0.
Tomomi Hirano (平野智美)	June 7, 2009	November 28, 2010	
Runa Kizawa (木沢留那)	March 27, 2010	November 28, 2010	
You Kikkawa (吉川友)	April 7, 2007	December 24, 2010	Kikkawa was part of MilkyWay as the character Kobeni Hanasaki. She debuted as a soloist under Up-Front Works in 2011.
Sayaka Kitahara (北原沙弥香)	June 20, 2004	March 9, 2011	Kitahara was part of MilkyWay as the character Noeru Yukino. She became a voice actress and singer managed by Ken Production.
Wakana Nagasawa (長澤和奏)	March 27, 2010	September 11, 2011	
Kanae Yamaga (山賀香菜恵)	November 12, 2011	August 26, 2012	
Minami Mogi (茂木美奈実)	June 20, 2011	November 20, 2012	
Rise Okamura (岡村里星)	March 31, 2012	June 12, 2013	
Jang Da Yeon (장다연)	June 21, 2009	July 30, 2013	
Kana Mashiro (真城佳奈)	May 5, 2013	October 21, 2013	
Rie Kaneko (金子りえ)	June 22, 2008	December 14, 2013	
Fuyuka Kosuga (小数賀芙由香)	January 11, 2012	May 4, 2014	Kosuga was originally set to debut in S/mileage September 2011 but had to leave due to health issues.
Karen Tanaka (田中可恋)	May 5, 2013	September 1, 2014	
Hirona Ooura (大浦央菜)	September 22, 2013	September 1, 2014	
Nanami Tanabe (田邉奈菜美)	December 11, 2009	November 5, 2014	She originally joined as a member of Shugo Chara Egg! as Amulet Dia after Ayaka Wada left the group. After finishing her training, she became a member of the group One Pixcel, managed by Toho Entertainment.
Kurumi Yoshihashi (吉橋くるみ)	February 2, 2011	November 5, 2014	
Kana Mikame (三瓶海南)	May 5, 2013	February 26, 2015	
Kana Saito (斎藤夏奈)	May 4, 2014	April 30, 2015	
Honoka Okamoto (岡本帆乃花)	April 1, 2015	November 6, 2015	
Miu Takemura (竹村未羽)	May 4, 2014	March 24, 2016	
Yumei Yokogawa (横川夢衣)	September 22, 2013	July 28, 2016	
Nagisa Hashimoto (橋本渚)	November 29, 2014	July 28, 2016	
Momoko Shimano (島野萌々子)	November 29, 2014	July 28, 2016	
Rion Nakano (仲野りおん)	April 1, 2015	July 28, 2016	
Marie Yoshida (吉田真理恵)	September 4, 2016	March 11, 2017	
Sayaka Goto (後藤咲香)	December 4, 2017	February 9, 2018	
Ryo Kitagawa (北川亮)	July 30, 2016	April 23, 2018	Former Hokkaido Kenshuusei
Kizuki Horie (堀江葵月)	November 29, 2014	August 24, 2018	
Mizuki Kanatsu (金津美月)	April 1, 2015	August 24, 2018	
Kurumi Noguchi (野口胡桃)	January 15, 2016	December 2, 2018	
Marina Hibi (日比麻里那)	March 11, 2017	December 2, 2018	
Rena Doi (土居麗菜)	March 11, 2017	December 2, 2018	
Sakiko Kodama (児玉咲子)	January 15, 2016	January 16. 2019	Former Deluxe Colors member, former Farewell MY L.u.v member
Mei Kusunoki (楠萌生)	December 2, 2018	April 2, 2019	2018 Hello! Project Only You! Audition Finalist
Kotomi Ono (小野琴己)	January 15, 2016	July 26, 2019	Former Avax Academy Trainee, ANGERME Shin Member finalist
Anna Shutto (出頭杏奈)	December 4, 2017	July 26, 2019	2018 Hello! Project Only You! Audition Finalist
Hikari Sato (佐藤光)	July 30, 2016	July 26, 2019	Former Hokkaido Kenshusei
Ruru Kanemitsu (金光留々)	December 4, 2017	December 29, 2019	Former Hello! Pro Kenshusei Unit member
Ririka Hashimoto (橋本莉々花)	August 2, 2019	April 19, 2020	Former Hokkaido Kenshusei
Hina Shibuya (渋谷妃菜)	December 3, 2019	April 19, 2020	Former Hokkaido Kenshusei
Minori Kawano (河野みのり)	July 30, 2016	March 16, 2021	Former Hokkaido Kenshusei
Karin Nishimura (西村風凛)	December 3, 2019	March 16, 2021	Former Hokkaido Kenshusei
Ichigo Yamada (山田苺)	March 11, 2017	April 23, 2021	Former Onigokko member
Karin Maeshima (前島花凛)	February 14, 2022	May 23, 2022	
Soara Kawano (河野空愛)	March 28, 2023	October 22, 2024	
Toa Makino (牧野永愛)	March 28, 2023	May 28, 2025	
Yurika Asano (浅野優莉花)	February 7, 2024	August 21, 2025	
Chihiro Miyakoshi (宮越千尋)	February 7, 2024	May 21, 2026	

== Discography ==
=== Albums ===
Title	Details	Charts
Title	Details	JP
1 Let’s Say "Hello!" (stylized as ① Let’s say “Hello!”)	Released: 18 February 2015; Label: Up-Front Indies; Format(s): CD, digital download	63
Rainbow×2	Released: 11 July 2018; Label: Up-Front Indies; Format(s): CD	88
3-STARS	Released: 29 September 2021; Label: Up-Front Indies; Format(s): CD	44

=== DVD singles ===
Year	Title	Peak chart position
Year	Title	JP
2013	"Oheso no Kuni kara Konnichiwa / Ten made Nobore!" (おへその国からこんにちは/天まで登れ!)	98
