= Fuka =

Fuka, Fūka or Fuuka may refer to:

- Fuka (surname), a Czech surname
- Fūka (given name), a Japanese feminine given name
- Fuuka (manga), a Japanese manga series
- Fukah, a village in Egypt, referred to as Fuka in a World War II context
  - Sidi Haneish Airfield, referred to as Fuka Aerodrome in World War II
- Fuka, a settlement in Gradec, Zagreb County, Croatia
