= Sayuki Takagi =

Japanese pop singer formerly of Hello! (born 1997)

Sayuki Takagi 高木 紗友希
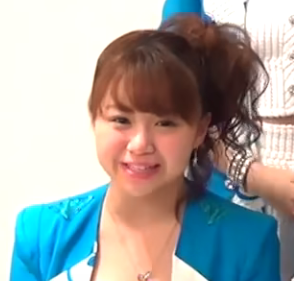

Background information
- Also known as: Sayubē; Ki (きー)
- Born: April 21, 1997 (age 29); Chiba Prefecture, Japan
- Genres: J-pop
- Occupation: Singer
- Years active: 2009–current

Sayuki Takagi (高木 紗友希, Takagi Sayuki; born 21 April 1997, in Chiba Prefecture, Japan) is a Japanese pop singer formerly of Hello! Project. She was a sub-leader and member of Japanese idol group Juice=Juice. Her official nickname is Sayubē (さゆべぇ). Her fruit in the group is lemon.

She left Hello! Project and Juice=Juice on 12 February 2021.

== Biography ==
- Takagi joined Hello! Pro Egg in November 2009.
- She was later introduced as a member of Hello! Pro Egg at the 2009 Hello! Project Shinjin Kōen 11-tsuki: Yokohama Fire! on 23 November 2009.
- In October 2010 Takagi co-starred with Ayano Sato in the third Gekijō-ban Hontō ni Atta Kowai Hanashi 3D film Darekairu.
- On the 3 February 2013 she was chosen of a new group along with Tomoko Kanazawa, Yuka Miyazaki, Akari Uemura, Karin Miyamoto, and Aina Ōtsuka. The name of the new group was revealed as Juice=Juice on the 25 February. The group made their major debut with the single "Romance no Tochū / Watashi ga Iu Mae ni Dakishimenakya ne (Memorial Edit) / Samidare Bijo ga Samidareru (Memorial Edit)" on 11 September.

== Publications ==
=== Videos ===
| Year | Title | Ref. |
|---|---|---|
| 2010 | Gekijō-ban Hontō ni Atta Kowai Hanashi 3D | |
| 2011 | Ima ga Itsuka ni Naru Mae ni | |
| 2012 | Reborn: Inochi no Audition | |
| 2012 | Sūgaku Joshi Gakuen | |

== Filmography ==
=== Concerts ===
| Year | Title | Ref. |
|---|---|---|
| 2009 | 2009 Hello! Project Shinjin Kōen 11-tsuki: Yokohama Fire! | |
| 2010 | 2010 Hello! Project Shinjin Kōen 3-tsuki: Yokohama Gold! | |
| 2010 | 2010 Hello! Project Shinjin Kōen 6-tsuki: Yokohama Hop! | |
| 2010 | 2010 Hello! Project Shinjin Kōen 9-tsuki: Yokohama Step! | |
| 2010 | 2010 Hello! Project Shinjin Kōen 11-tsuki: Yokohama Jump! | |
| 2011 | Hello! Pro Egg 2011 Happyōkai: 9-tsuki no Nama Tamago Show! | |
| 2012 | Hello! Pro Kenshusei Happyōkai 2012: 3-tsuki no Nama Tamago Show! | |
| 2012 | Hello! Pro Kenshusei Happyōkai 2012: 6-tsuki no Nama Tamago Show! | |
| 2012 | Hello! Pro Kenshusei Happyōkai 2012: 9-tsuki no Nama Tamago Show! | |

=== Events ===
| Year | Title | Ref. |
|---|---|---|
| 2011 | One Love Life Live | |
| 2011 | Hello! Pro Egg Shiodome AX Event | |
| 2011 | Shiodome Idol Carnival! 2011 in Shiodome-AX | |
| 2012 | Shio-haku 2012 Shiodome Idol Carnival! 2012 Hello! Pro Kenshusei Kaki Kyūka-chū: Shiodome Hunter | |

=== Stage ===
| Year | Title | Role | Ref. |
|---|---|---|---|
| 2009 | Koko Smile 6: Natsuiro no Canvas | Konoha Kashiwagi | |
| 2010 | Kuukan Jelly vol.12: Ima ga Itsuka ni Naru Mae ni | Ayano Fukumoto | |

=== Musicals ===
| Year | Title | Role | Ref. |
|---|---|---|---|
| 2011 | Reborn: Inochi no Audition | Kounotori | |

=== Films ===
| Year | Title | Role | Notes | Ref. |
|---|---|---|---|---|
| 2010 | Darekairu | Asuka Kurata | Lead role | |

=== TV dramas ===
| Year | Title | Role | Network | Ref. |
|---|---|---|---|---|
| 2010 | Dokodoki Mayomayo | Wakana | NHK E TV | |
| 2012 | Sūgaku Joshi Gakuen | Haru Maihama | NTV | |

=== Variety ===
| Year | Title | Network |
|---|---|---|
| 2010 | Asondemanabu Ninki Koyaku ga Ikemen Sensei to Shakaikakengaku! | TV Tokyo |
