= Fukala =

Fukala (feminine: Fukalová) is a Czech surname. Notable people with the surname include:

- Michal Fukala (born 2000), Czech footballer
- Radek Fukala (born 1963), Czech historian
- Vincenz Fukala (1847–1911), Polish ophthalmologist and ophthalmology historian

== See also ==
- Wanda Fukała-Kaczmarczyk (1935–2026), Polish fencer
- Fuka (surname), a Czech surname
