= Number 2 ¡Una mas! =

#2 ¡Una mas!

Studio album by Juice=Juice
- Released: August 1, 2018 JP
- Genres: J-pop; synthpop; electropop; dance-pop
- Length: 93:12
- Label: Hachama

Juice=Juice chronology
| First Squeeze! (2015) | #2 ¡Una mas! (2018) |

Singles from #2 ¡Una mas!
- 1. "Wonderful World / Ça va? Ça va?" Released: April 8, 2015; 2. "Next is you / Karada Dake ga Otona ni Nattan ja nai" Released: February 3, 2016; 3. "Dream Road ~Kokoro ga Odaridashiteru / KEEP ON Joshou Shikou!! / Ashita Yarou wa Bakayarou" Released: October 26, 2016; 4. "Jidanda Dance / Feel! Kanjiru yo" Released: April 26, 2017; 5. "SEXY SEXY / Naite ii yo / Vivid Midnight" Released: April 4, 2018

#2 ¡Una mas! is the second studio album by Japanese girl idol group Juice=Juice. It was released on 1 August 2018 on the label Hachama.

== Release ==
The album was released in two editions: a regular edition and a limited edition. The limited edition included an additional Blu-ray disc.

== Chart performance ==
The album debuted and peaked at number 4 in the Japanese Oricon weekly album charts. It also ranked on number 7 Japan Billboard HOT 100 and reached the Billboard album charts at number 4 with 13,945 first week sales.

== Track listing ==
CD 1
| No. | Title | Notes | Length |
|---|---|---|---|
| 1. | "Fiesta! Fiesta!" | First digital single | 4:22 |
| 2. | "SEXY SEXY" | First A-side of the 10th major single | 4:45 |
| 3. | "Naite Ii yo (泣いていいよ)" | Second A-side of the 10th major single | 4:56 |
| 4. | "Vivid Midnight" | Third A-side of the 10th major single | 4:05 |
| 5. | "Jidanda Dance (地団駄ダンス)" | First A-side of the 9th major single | 3:48 |
| 6. | "Feel! Kanjiru yo (Feel！感じるよ)" | Second B-side of the 9th major single | 3:58 |
| 7. | "Dream Road ~Kokoro ga Odoridashiteru~ (Dream Road～心が躍り出してる～)" | First A-side of the 8th major single | 4:59 |
| 8. | "KEEP ON Joshou Shikou!! (KEEP ON 上昇志向！！)" | Second A-side of the 8th major single | 4:25 |
| 9. | "Ashita Yarou wa Bakayarou (明日やろうはバカやろう)" | Third A-side of the 8th major single | 3:34 |
| 10. | "Next is you!" | First A-side of the 7th major single | 4:30 |
| 11. | "Karada Dake ga Otona ni Nattan ja nai (カラダだけが大人になったんじゃない)" | Second A-side of the 7th major single | 4:17 |
| Total length: | | | 42:31 |

CD 2
| No. | Title | Notes | Length |
|---|---|---|---|
| 1. | "Never Never Surrender" | | 3:54 |
| 2. | "Jouro (Album Version) (如雨露)" | First introduced on tour and then digitally released | 4:11 |
| 3. | "TOKYO Glider (TOKYOグライダー)" | | 4:15 |
| 4. | "Synchro. (シンクロ。)" | | 4:18 |
| 5. | "Abarete kka? Have a Good Time (あばれてっか？！ハブアグッタイ)" | | 4:29 |
| 6. | "Sunao ni Amaete (素直に甘えて)" | | 3:46 |
| 7. | "Goal ~Ashita wa Acchi da yo~ (Album Version) (Goal～明日はあっちだよ～)" | First introduced on tour and then digitally released | 4:59 |
| 8. | "Gin Iro no Telepathy (銀色のテレパシー)" | | 4:19 |
| 9. | "Kono Sekai wa Suteta mon ja nai (この世界は捨てたもんじゃない)" | | 4:21 |
| 10. | "Kindan Shoujo (禁断少女)" | | 4:55 |
| 11. | "Otona no Jijou (大人の事情)" | Released as a digital single; made for the TV drama 'Budokan' | 4:02 |
| 12. | "Wonderful World (2018 version)" | First A-side of the 6th major single | 4:14 |
| Total length: | | | 51:41 |

Limited Edition (Blu-Ray Disc)
| No. | Title | Length |
|---|---|---|
| 1. | "Next is you! (Music Video)" |
| 2. | "Next is you! (Dance Shot Ver.)" |
| 3. | "Next is you! (Close-up Ver.)" |
| 4. | "Karada Dake ga Otona ni Nattan ja nai (Music Video)" |
| 5. | "Karada Dake ga Otona ni Nattan ja nai (Dance Shot Ver.)" |
| 6. | "Karada Dake ga Otona ni Nattan ja nai (Close-up Ver.)" |
| 7. | "Dream Road ~Kokoro ga Odoridashiteru~ (Music Video)" |
| 8. | "Dream Road ~Kokoro ga Odoridashiteru~ (Dance Shot Ver.)" |
| 9. | "Dream Road ~Kokoro ga Odorishiteru~ (Close-up Ver.)" |
| 10. | "KEEP ON Joshou Shikou!! (Music Video)" |
| 11. | "KEEP ON Joshou Shikou!! (Dance Shot Ver.)" |
| 12. | "KEEP ON Joshou Shikou!! (Close-up Ver.)" |
| 13. | "Ashita Yarou wa Bakayarou (Music Video)" |
| 14. | "Ashita Yarou wa Bakayarou (Dance Shot Ver.)" |
| 15. | "Ashita Yarou wa Bakayarou (Close-up Ver.)" |
| 16. | "Jidanda Dance (Music Video)" |
| 17. | "Jidanda Dance (Dance Shot Ver.)" |
| 18. | "Jidanda Dance (Close-up Ver.)" |
| 19. | "Feel! Kanjiru yo (Music Video)" |
| 20. | "Feel! Kanjiru yo (Dance Shot Ver.)" |
| 21. | "Feel! Kanjiru yo (Close-up Ver.)" |
| 22. | "SEXY SEXY (Music Video)" |
| 23. | "SEXY SEXY (Dance Shot Ver.)" |
| 24. | "SEXY SEXY (Close-up Ver.)" |
| 25. | "Naite Ii yo (Music Video)" |
| 26. | "Naite Ii yo (Dance Shot Ver.)" |
| 27. | "Naite Ii yo (Close-up Ver.)" |
| 28. | "Vivid Midnight (Music Video)" |
| 29. | "Vivid Midnight (Dance Shot Ver.)" |

== Charts ==
| Chart (2018) | Peak position |
|---|---|
| Japan (Billboard Weekly) | 4 |
| Japan (Oricon Weekly) | 4 |
