= Momoha =

- Language(s): Japanese

Origin
- Meaning: Different based on the kanji used

Momoha (桃葉, 桃羽, 百葉, 百八) is a Japanese feminine given name.

The kanji variant 桃葉 can alternatively be read as Tōyō, a masculine name.

== People with the given name ==
- Momoha Tabata (田畑 百葉, born 2002), Japanese curler
- Momoha Yukishima (雪嶋 桃葉), former member of College Cosmos, a Japanese idol girl group

== Fictional characters ==
- Momoha from Manyu Scroll
- Momoha Bonnouji (盆能寺 百八) from The 100 Girlfriends Who Really, Really, Really, Really, Really Love You
- Momoha Odori (小鳥 桃葉) from Gakuen Utopia Manabi Straight!

== See also ==
- Momoha Maru, cargo ship of the Imperial Japanese Army that was sunk on March 15, 1943, by the USS Trigger
