= Kobushi =

Kobushi (拳) is a Japanese word for fist. It may also refer to:

- Kobushi (Transformers)
- Magnolia kobus, a species of Japanese magnolia also known as the Kobushi magnolia
- Kobushi (TV series), a French children's TV series.
- Kobushi Factory, a Japanese girl idol group
- Kobushi, a form of melisma characteristic of Enka singing.
