= Ocha Norma =

Japanese girl group

- Origin: Japan
- Genres: J-pop
- Years active: 2021–present
- Labels: Up-Front Works; Zetima
- Members: Madoka Saito; Ruli Hiromoto; Kirara Yonemura; Nanami Kubota; Natsume Nakayama; Miku Nishizaki; Momo Kitahara; Roko Tsutsui
- Past members: Sumire Tashiro; Kanami Ishiguri
- Website: www.helloproject.com/ochanorma/

Ocha Norma (オチャノーマ) is a Japanese idol girl group that formed in 2021. They released their debut single, "Koi no Crouching Start / Omatsuri Debut da ze!", on July 13, 2022. Its name (お茶の間, in Kanji and Hiragana) means Japanese-style living room in Japanese.

== History ==
On March 7, 2021, it was announced by Mizuki Fukumura that a new Hello! Project group would be formed that year with the first members to join the line-up announced as Kirara Yonemura, Kanami Ishiguri, Nanami Kubota and Madoka Saito. It was also revealed that the line-up would be finalised by the end of the year. On July 5, additional members of the group were announced as Natsume Nakayama, Ruli Hiromoto, Miku Nishizaki, and Momo Kitahara. A Hello! Project audition was held starting on July 20, in order to add more members to the group's line-up. On December 12, it was announced by Karin Miyamoto, that the group would be named Ocha Norma and two contestants from the previous audition, Sumire Tashiro and Roko Tsutsui, would join the group.

On January 8, 2022, Ocha Norma digitally released their first song, "Ramen Daisuki Koizumi-san no Uta". On July 13, the group released their debut single "Koi no Crouching Start / Omatsuri Debut da ze!". Their second single, "Unmei Chachacha~n / Uchira no Jimoto wa Chikyuu Jan!", was released on November 30. On December 30, Ocha Norma won a "New Artist Award" at the 64th Japan Record Awards.

On July 26, 2023, they released their third single, "Chotto Jyocho Fuantei?... Natsu / Ochanoma Mahoroba Ikoinoba (Showa mo Reiwa mo Wacchawacha) / Shekenare / Yoridori Me Dream".

On January 10, 2024, they released their first studio album, "CHAnnel #1".

On September 5, it was announced that Sumire Tashiro had been diagnosed with adjustment disorder and would be taking a month-long hiatus in order to rest and receive hospital treatment.

On September 30, it was announced that that Sumire Tashiro needs to continue resting and outpatient treatment. Under medical guidance, her activities with OCHA NORMA will be suspended until the end of November.

On December 4, an announcement was released stating that while her condition has improved, Tashiro still required treatment and would be absent from activities until cleared by a doctor. She also posted a blog entry apologizing for her absence stating that since she has been feeling better, she'll try to update from time to time.

On March 11 2025, it was announced that Sumire Tashiro would be immediately graduating from the group and Hello! Project without a graduation ceremony due to her health conditions.

On March 21, it was announced that Kanami Ishiguri would be immediately graduating from the group and Hello! Project without a graduation ceremony due to her health conditions

== Members ==
=== Current ===
- Madoka Saito (斉藤円香) – Leader (2021–present)
- Ruli Hiromoto (広本瑠璃) – Sub-Leader (2021–present)
- Kirara Yonemura (米村姫良々) (2021–present)
- Nanami Kubota (窪田七海) (2021–present)
- Natsume Nakayama (中山夏月姫) (2021–present)
- Miku Nishizaki (西﨑美空) (2021–present)
- Momo Kitahara (北原もも) (2021–present)
- Roko Tsutsui (筒井澪心) (2021–present)

=== Former ===
- Sumire Tashiro (田代すみれ) (2021–2025)
- Kanami Ishiguri (石栗奏美) (2021–2025)

== Discography ==
=== Singles ===
Title	Year	Peak chart positions		Sales	Certifications	Album
Title	Year	JPN Oricon	JPN Hot 100	Sales	Certifications	Album
"Koi no Crouching Start / Omatsuri Debut da ze!" (恋のクラウチングスタート/お祭りデビューだぜ！)	2022	2	2	JPN: 95,548	RIAJ: Gold (phy.)	Non-album singles
"Unmei Chachacha~n / Uchira no Jimoto wa Chikyuu Jan!" (運命 CHACHACHACHA～N/ウチらの地元は地球じゃん!)	2022	2	6	JPN: 74,719	RIAJ: Gold (phy.)	Non-album singles
"Chotto Jyocho Fuantei?... Natsu / Ochanoma Mahoroba Ikoinoba (Showa mo Reiwa mo Wacchawacha) / Shekenare / Yoridori Me Dream" (ちょっと情緒不安定?…夏/オチャノマ マホロバ イコイノバ ～昭和も令和もワッチャワチャ～/シェケナーレ/ヨリドリ ME DREAM)	2023	2	6	JPN: 77,758	RIAJ: Gold (phy.)	Non-album singles
"Chihayaburu / Tomodachi Tentaizu" (ちはやぶる/友達天体図)	2024	4	4	JPN: 73,470	RIAJ: Gold (phy.)	Non-album singles
"Onna no Aiso wa Bukijanai / Gakkō de wa Oshietekurenai Koto" (女の愛想は武器じゃない/学校では教えてくれないこと)	2025	3	6	JPN: 68,315	RIAJ: Gold (phy.)	Non-album singles
"Dantotsu de Aishite / Mata, Anata ni Koikogarete Irun da" (ダントツで愛して/また、あなたに恋焦がれているんだ)	2026	3	3	JPN: 84,961	RIAJ: Gold (phy.)	Non-album singles

== Awards and nominations ==
Award ceremony	Year	Category	Nominee(s)/work(s)	Result	Ref.
Japan Record Awards	2022	New Artist Award	Ocha Norma	Won	
