= Watashi ga Iu Mae ni Dakishimenakya ne =

Single by Juice=Juice
- Released: April 3, 2013
- Genre: J-pop; pop; electropop
- Label: Up-Front Works
- Songwriter: Tsunku
- Producer: Tsunku

Juice=Juice singles chronology
"Watashi ga Iu Mae ni Dakishimenakya ne" (2013)	"Samidare Bijo ga Samidareru" (2013)

Music video
- "Watashi ga Iu Mae ni Dakishimenakya ne" on YouTube

"Watashi ga Iu Mae ni Dakishimenakya ne" (私が言う前に抱きしめなきゃね) is the debut indie single by Japanese girl idol group Juice=Juice, released in Japan on April 3, 2013.

The physical CD single ranked 25th place in the Japanese Oricon weekly singles chart.

== Track listing ==
All lyrics are written by Tsunku; all music is composed by Tsunku and arranged by Shoichiro Hirata.

No.	Title	Length
1.	"Watashi ga Iu Mae ni Dakishimenakya ne" (私が言う前に抱きしめなきゃね)	3:58
2.	"Watashi ga Iu Mae ni Dakishimenakya ne (Instrumental)"	3:57
Total length:		7:15

== Charts ==
Chart (2013)	Peak position
Japan (Oricon Daily Singles Chart)	17
Japan (Oricon Weekly Singles Chart)	25
