= Camellia Factory =

Japanese idol group

- Logo

Background information
- Origin: Tokyo, Japan
- Genres: J-pop, pop
- Years active: 2015–present
- Labels: Up-Front Works; Zetima
- Spinoff of: Hello Pro Kenshusei
- Members: Ami Tanimoto; Mizuho Ono; Saori Onoda; Yuumi Kasai; Marine Fukuda; Runo Yofu; Mihane Ishii; Yuu Murata; Fuka Doi; Itsuki Nishimura
- Past members: Risa Ogata; Kiki Asakura; Riko Yamagishi; Yumeno Kishimoto; Kisora Niinuma; Shiori Yagi; Mao Akiyama

Camellia Factory (つばきファクトリー, Tsubaki Fakutori) is a Japanese idol group, formed in late April 2015 under the umbrella of Hello! Project. It is currently composed of twelve members. Their sister group was Magnolia Factory.

== History ==
=== 2015: Formation ===
On April 29, the group was announced by Japanese media as a new Hello Pro Kenshusei unit, and confirmed through Hello! Project Station. Initially the group consisted of six members: Risa Ogata, Riko Yamagishi, Kisora Niinuma, Ami Tanimoto, Yumeno Kishimoto and Kiki Asakura.

The group first performed at the Hello Pro Kenshūsei Happyōkai 2015 ~ Haru no kōkai jitsuryoku shindan tesuto ~ on May 4.

On August 8, during the Hello! Project 2015 Summer concert, Riko Yamagishi was announced as the leader of Tsubaki Factory, while Risa Ogata was announced as the group's sub-leader.

=== 2015–16: Indies and New Members ===
On September 6, 2015, Tsubaki Factory released their first indie single "Seishun Manmannaka!".

On December 31, Tsubaki Factory released their second indie single "Kedakaku Sakihokore!".

On May 18, 2016, Tsubaki Factory released their first extended play, Tsubaki Factory Sound + Vision Vol.1.

On August 13, it was announced at a Tsubaki Factory fan club event that Hello Pro Kenshuusei members Mizuho Ono, Saori Onoda, and Mao Akiyama had joined the group as new members. The new nine-member line-up debuted on September 4 at Hello! Project Kenshūsei Happyōkai 2016 9gatsu ~Singing!~, where it was announced by Hello! Project advisor Shimizu Saki that Tsubaki Factory would finally make their major debut in January 2017.

=== 2017: Major debut ===
Tsubaki Factory released their major debut single, "Hatsukoi Sunrise / Just Try! / Uruwashi no Camellia" on February 22, 2017.

Tsubaki Factory released their second major single, "Shuukatsu Sensation / Waratte / Hana Moyou" on July 26.

On November 9, it was announced that Tsubaki Factory had won a Newcomer Award from the 50th Japan Cable Awards; they were presented their award at the ceremony on December 4.

It was announced on November 16 that Tsubaki Factory had won a Newcomer Award at the 59th Japan Record Awards. At the ceremony on December 30, they were presented with their award and were later announced as the winners of the Best Newcomer Award out of three other artists.

=== 2018–present: Continued success, Ogata's departure and new members ===
Tsubaki Factory released their third major single "Teion Yakedo / Shunrenka / I Need You ~Yozora no Kanransha~" on February 21, 2018.

On July 18, Tsubaki Factory released their fourth single, "Date no Hi wa Nido Kurai Shower Shite Dekaketai / Junjou cm / Kon'ya Dake Ukaretakatta".

On September 21, it was announced that Tsubaki Factory would sing Japanese covers of the opening and ending themes for the DreamWorks animated TV series Trolls: Sing, Dance, Hug! which began airing on TV Tokyo on October 3.

The group released their first studio album, First Bloom, on November 14.

On February 27, 2019, the group released their fifth single, "Sankaime no Date Shinwa / Fuwari, Koi Dokei".

On January 15, 2020, Tsubaki Factory released their sixth single, "Ishiki Takai Otome no Dilemma / Dakishimerarete Mitai".

The group released their seventh single, "Dansha-ISM / Ima Nanji?", on September 30.

On October 8, Risa Ogata went on voluntary suspension from the group following several leaked posts from her private social media account. On December 28, it was announced that Ogata would leave the group.

On January 20, 2021, it was announced Tsubaki Factory and labelmates Juice=Juice would be holding a joint new member audition.

On July 7, it was announced through Hello! Project Station that Hello! Project "Juice=Juice" "Tsubaki Factory" Goudou Shin Member Audition winners Yuumi Kasai, Shiori Yagi, Marine Fukuda and Hello Pro Kenshuusei member Runo Yofu have joined the group as new members.

On November 11, it was announced that the group would be holding a special online event titled "Tsubaki Factory Major Debut 5 Shuunen Kinen! SPOOX MUSIC ~Tsubaki Factory Xmas LIVE~" at Billboard Live TOKYO as part of their 5th anniversary of their major debut commemoration. Tickets to watch the event were available for purchase at the distribution service SPOOX from November 28 to December 31, and was available for viewing from December 24 to December 31. In addition, a special version of the event, including unaired performances and behind-the-scenes footage, was broadcast at the channel SPACE SHOWER TV on January 23, 2023. A recording of the event was later included in the Limited Edition SP of the group's 10th single.

On February 22, the group released their tenth single, "Machigai ja nai Naitari Shinai / Skip・Skip・Skip / Kimi to Boku no Kizuna feat. KIKI".

On April 2, Kiki Asakura officially graduated from the group and Hello! Project at the Hello! Project Hina Fes 2023 "Tsubaki Factory Premium ~Asakura Kiki Sotsugyou Special~". Riko Yamagishi and Yumeno Kishimoto also graduated in November that same year.

Kisora Niinuma became the group's new leader. On January 26, it was announced that Kisora Niinuma will be graduating from the group at the end of their 2024 spring concert tour.

On February 7, it was announced through Hello! Project Station that Hello! Project 25 Shuunen Kinen Shin Member Audition winners Mihane Ishii, Yuu Murata and Fuka Doi have joined the group as new members.

On May 25, it was announced at the Tsubaki Factory Concert Tour 2024 Haru "C'mon Everybody!" that Tanimoto Ami would be succeeding Niinuma Kisora as the third leader of the group and Ono Mizuho would succeed Tanimoto as a new sub-leader starting on June 11 following Niinuma's graduation.

On June 10, Kisora Niinuma officially graduated from the group and Hello! Project at the Tsubaki Factory Concert Tour 2024 Haru "C'mon Everybody! ~Niinuma Kisora Sotsugyou Special~".

On August 28, the group released their 12th single, "Baby Spider / Seishun Exabyte / Kodou OK?". It is the first to include the new members Mihane Ishii, Yuu Murata and Fuka Doi, and the last to include Kisora Niinuma.

On January 27, it was announced that Shiori Yagi will be graduating from the group and Hello! Project on April 30 (the same date as the group's 10th-anniversary Nippon Budokan concert) to pursue a career as a musical actress.

On April 30, Shiori Yagi officially graduated from the group and Hello! Project at the end of the group's 10th-anniversary Nippon Budokan concert.

On June 4, the group will release their 13th single. One of the A-sides of the single will be a cover of Mano Erina's song "My Days for You".

On August 16, it was announced at the Hello! Con 2025 concert in LaLa arena TOKYO-BAY that Itsuki Nishimura would be joining Tsubaki Factory as a new member.

On March 3, it was announced that Mao Akiyama would be graduating from the group and Hello! Project following the conclusion of their 2026 fall tour.

On October 26, Mao Akiyama officially graduated from Tsubaki Factory and Hello! Project at the last day of Tsubaki Factory's 2026 fall concert tour Tsubaki Factory CONCERT TOUR 2026 AUTUMN ~Bloomy Groovy Story~ Akiyama Mao Final "Hana Oto" held at Nippon Budokan.

== Members ==
=== Current ===
- Ami Tanimoto (谷本安美) – Leader (2015–Present)
- Mizuho Ono (小野瑞歩) – Sub-Leader (2016–Present)
- Saori Onoda (小野田紗栞) (2016–Present)
- Yuumi Kasai (河西結心) (2021–Present)
- Marine Fukuda (福田真琳) (2021–Present)
- Runo Yofu (豫風瑠乃) (2021–Present)
- Mihane Ishii (石井泉羽) (2024–Present)
- Yuu Murata (村田結生) (2024–Present)
- Fuka Doi (土居楓奏) (2024–Present)
- Itsuki Nishimura (西村乙輝) (2025–Present)

=== Former ===
- Risa Ogata (小片リサ) – Sub-leader (2015–2020)
- Kiki Asakura (浅倉樹々) (2015–2023)
- Riko Yamagishi (山岸理子) – Leader (2015–2023)
- Yumeno Kishimoto (岸本ゆめの) (2015–2023)
- Kisora Niinuma (新沼希空) – Leader (2015–2024)
- Shiori Yagi (八木栞) (2021–2025)
- Mao Akiyama (秋山眞緒) (2016–2026)

== Discography ==
=== Studio albums ===
Title	Album details	Peak chart positions		sales
Title	Album details	JPN	JPN Hot	sales
First Bloom	Released: November 14, 2018; Label: Zetima; Formats: CD, digital download	6	7	JPN: 14,721
2nd Step	Released: May 26, 2021; Label: Zetima; Formats: CD, digital download	3	—	JPN: 15,333
3rd Moment	Released: February 21, 2024; Label: Zetima; Formats: CD, digital download	5	—	

=== Singles ===
Title	Year	Peak chart positions		Album
Title	Year	JPN	JPN Hot	Album
Indie singles
"Seishun Manmannaka!" (青春まんまんなか!)	2015	—	—	Non-album singles
"Kedakaku Sakihokore!" (気高く咲き誇れ!)	2015	—	—	Non-album singles
Hitorijime / Watashi ga Obasan ni Natte mo" (独り占め／私がオバさんになっても)	2015	—	—	Non-album singles
Major singles
"Hatsukoi Sunrise / Just Try! / Uruwashi no Camellia" (初恋サンライズ／Just Try!／うるわしのカメリア)	2017	3	6	First Bloom
"Shūkatsu Sensation / Waratte / Hana Moyou" (就活センセーション／笑って／ハナモヨウ)	2017	5	6	First Bloom
"Teion Yakedo / Shunrenka / I Need You ~Yozora no Kanransha~" (低温火傷／春恋歌／I Need You ～夜空の観覧車～)	2018	2	3	First Bloom
"Date no Hi wa Nido Kurai Shower Shite Dekaketai / Junjou cm / Kon'ya Dake Ukaretakatta" (デートの日は二度くらいシャワーして出かけたい/純情cm/今夜だけ浮かれたかった)	2018	2	3	First Bloom
"Sankaime no Date Shinwa / Fuwari, Koi Dokei" (三回目のデート神話/ふわり、恋時計)	2019	2	6	2nd Step
"Ishiki Takai Otome no Dilemma / Dakishimerarete Mitai" (意識高い乙女のジレンマ/抱きしめられてみたい)	2020	3	7	2nd Step
"Dansha-ISM / Ima Nanji?" (断捨ISM/イマナンジ?)	2020	4	19	2nd Step
"Namida no Heroine Kōban Geki / Garakuta Diamond / Yakusoku・Renraku・Kinenbi" (涙のヒロイン降板劇/ガラクタDIAMOND/約束・連絡・記念日)	2021	3	6	3rd Moment
"Adrenaline Dame / Yowasa ja nai yo, Koi wa / Idol Tenshoku Ondo" (アドレナリン・ダメ/弱さじゃないよ、恋は/アイドル天職音頭)	2022	1	3	3rd Moment
"Machigai ja nai Naitari Shinai / Skip Skip Skip / Kimi to Boku no Kizuna" (間違いじゃない 泣いたりしない/スキップ・スキップ・スキップ/君と僕の絆)	2023	3	3	3rd Moment
"Yūki It's My Life! / Mōsō Dake Nara Freedom / Demo...Ii yo" (勇気 It's my Life！ / 妄想だけならフリーダム / でも…いいよ)	2023	2	6	3rd Moment
"Baby Spider / Seishun Exabyte / Kodou OK?" (ベイビースパイダー/青春エクサバイト/鼓動OK？)	2024	4	5	TBA
"My Days for You / Kanashimi ga Tomaranai" (My Days for You/悲しみがとまらない)	2025	2	4	TBA
"FireWorks / Mappira Datteba!" (FireWorks/まっぴらだってば!)	2026	3	5	TBA

== Awards and nominations ==
=== Japan Record Awards ===
The Japan Record Awards is a major music awards show held annually in Japan by the Japan Composer's Association.

Year	Nominee / work	Award	Result
2017	Camellia Factory	New Artist Award	Won
2017	Camellia Factory	Best New Artist Award	Won

Preceded by iKon	Japan Record Award for Best New Artist; 2017	Succeeded by Yuto Tatsumi
