= Fūka (given name) =

- Gender: Female

Origin
- Origin: Japanese
- Meaning: Different meanings depending on the kanji used

Fūka, Fuka or Fuuka (written: 風花, 風香) is a feminine Japanese given name. Notable people with the name include:

- Fuka Doi (土居 楓奏; born 2010), Japanese member of the Camellia Factory
- Fūka Haruna (春名 風花; born 2001), Japanese child actress
- Fūka Izumi (和泉 風花; born 2001), Japanese voice actress
- Fuka Kakimoto (柿本 風香; born 1984), Japanese retired professional wrestler
- Fuka Kono (児野 楓香; born 1998), Japanese professional footballer
- Fuka Koshiba (小芝 風花; born 1997), Japanese actress
- Fūka Murakumo (村雲 颯香; born 1997), Japanese member of the NGT48
- Fuka Nagano (長野 風花; born 1999), Japanese women's footballer
- Fuuka Nishihira (西平 風香; born 1992), Japanese actress
- Fuka Suga (菅 楓華; born 2005), Japanese professional golfer
- Fuka Tsunoda (角田 楓佳; born 2004), Japanese professional footballer

== Fictional characters ==
- Fuuka Akitsuki (秋月 風夏), a character in the final chapter of Suzuka, and the main heroine of Fuuka
- Fuuka Aoi (碧井 風夏), a character in the manga series Fuuka
- Fuuka Ayase (綾瀬 風香), a character in the manga series Yotsuba&!
- Fuuka Igasaki (伊賀崎 風花), a character in the tokusatsu television series Shuriken Sentai Ninninger
- Fūka Kamiigusa (上井草 風香), a character in the light novel series The Pet Girl of Sakurasou
- Fuka Kazamatsuri, a character in the video game Disgaea 4
- Fuka Matsui (松井 風花), a character in the manga series Kodocha
- Fuuka Miyazawa (宮沢 風花), a character in a 2021 anime The Aquatope on White Sand
- Fuka Narutaki (鳴滝 風香), a character in the manga series Negima!
- Fuuka Reventon (フーカ・レヴェントン), a character in the anime series ViVid Strike!
- Fuuka Yamagishi (山岸 風花), a character in the video game Shin Megami Tensei: Persona 3
- Fuka, a character in the anime series Naruto Shippuden
- Fuka, the default name of the main heroine in the video game OZMAFIA!!
