= College Cosmos (group) =

Japanese idol girl group

- Origin: Japan
- Genres: J-pop
- Years active: 2018–2020
- Label: Zetima
- Past members: Megumi Nitadori; Mana Wakita; Miko Funada; Sana Hashimoto; Mai Ito; Sakino Hiraga; Misaki Sakamoto; Marin Watanabe; Kyoka Fukusawa; Rina Niinomi; Mayuko Okamoto; Natsuki Aono; Risa Yamaki; Rina Wakita; Nana Nakajima; Motoka Matsuoka; Haruka Tsushima; Mari Matsui; Kana Akizuki; Marin Suga; Ayaka Ito; Momoha Yukishima; Nao Gunji; Natsuki
- Website: collegecosmos.jp

College Cosmos (カレッジ・コスモス, Karejji Kosumosu), was a Japanese idol girl group made up of university students. They released their debut single, Dreams are mean / I Want to Filter the Water of Words / We are not such things like symbols, on March 6, 2019. They disbanded at the end of May 2020 after discussions surrounding the COVID-19 pandemic.

== History ==
On October 3, 2018, it was announced that Space Craft Group and Up-Front Group would start a joint girl group consisting of twenty five university students including Risa Yamaki of Country Girls. Megumi Nitadori graduated from the group in January 2019, prior to debut, citing poor health as the reason. The group debuted on March 6, with the single, Dreams are mean / I Want to Filter the Water of Words / We are not such things like symbols. Mana Wakita and Miko Funada graduated later that month. Sana Hashimoto graduated suddenly in June. The group released their second single, Where is the place where I can find happiness? / My Revolution, on October 9. Mai Ito, Sakino Hiraga, Misaki Sakamoto, Marin Watanabe, Kyoka Fukusawa, Rina Niinomi, Mayuko Okamoto, Natsuki Aono, Risa Yamaki and Rina Wakita graduated in October followed by Nana Nakajima in December, Motoka Matsuoka, Haruka Tsushima and Mari Matsui in March 2020. In May, after discussions surrounding the COVID-19 pandemic, it was announced that the group would cease activities at the end of the month with all members graduating and the group eventually being re-booted with new members.

== Members ==
=== Former ===
- Megumi Nitadori (似鳥めぐみ)
- Mana Wakita (脇田茉奈)
- Miko Funada (舩田美子)
- Sana Hashimoto (橋本紗奈)
- Mai Ito (伊藤舞)
- Sakino Hiraga (平賀咲乃)
- Misaki Sakamoto (坂本美咲)
- Marin Watanabe (渡辺磨玲)
- Kyoka Fukusawa (深澤京花)
- Rina Niinomi (新家利奈)
- Mayuko Okamoto (岡本真由子)
- Natsuki Aono (蒼乃菜月)
- Risa Yamaki (山木梨沙) - former member of Country Girls
- Rina Wakita (脇田璃奈)
- Nana Nakajima (中島菜々)
- Motoka Matsuoka (松岡資佳)
- Haruka Tsushima (對馬桜花)
- Mari Matsui (松井まり)
- Kana Akizuki (秋月香七)
- Marin Suga (菅真鈴)
- Ayaka Ito (伊藤彩華)
- Momoha Yukishima (雪嶋桃葉)
- Nao Gunji (郡司奈桜)
- Natsuki (菜月)

== Discography ==
=== Singles ===
Title	Year	Peak chart positions	Album
Title	Year	Oricon	Album
"Dreams are mean / I Want to Filter the Water of Words / We are not such things like symbols" (夢は意地悪/言葉の水を濾過したい/記号なんかじゃない私たちは)	2019	13	Non-album singles
"Where is the place where I can find happiness? / My Revolution" (幸せのありかはどちらですか/わたし革命)	2019	11	Non-album singles
