= 64th Japan Record Awards =

2022 Japanese music awards ceremony

- Date: 30 December 2022
- Location: New National Theatre Tokyo
- Hosted by: Kasumi Arimura; Shinichiro Azumi

Television/radio coverage
- Network: TBS

The 64th Japan Record Awards (第64回日本レコード大賞, Dai Rokujū Yon-kai Nihon Rekōdo Taishō) was held on 30 December 2022.

Nominations and awards were announced by the organizers on 15 November. This was the first awards ceremony since 2019 to allow attendance at the venue.

== Presenters ==
- Kasumi Arimura
- Shinichiro Azumi (TBS Announcer)

== Winners ==
=== Grand Prix ===
- Sekai no Owari – "Habit"
  - Artist: Sekai no Owari
  - Lyrics: Fukase
  - Music: Nakajin
  - Arranger: Sekai no Owari

=== Excellent Work Awards ===
- Junretsu - "Kimi wo Ubai Saritai"
- NiziU - "Clap Clap"
- Wacci - "Koidaro"
- Kiyoshi Hikawa – "Koshuji"
- Ado - "New Genesis"
- Da-ice - "Starmine"
- Mrs. Green Apple - "Dance Hall"
- Macaroni Enpitsu - "Nandemo Nai yo,"
- Be:First - "Bye-Good-Bye"
- Sekai no Owari - "Habit"

=== New Artist Awards ===
- Hanna Ishikawa
- Ocha Norma
- Aimi Tanaka
- Yuuki Tani

=== Best Vocal Performance ===
- Daichi Miura

=== Special Prize ===
- Ado
- Aimer
- Otokogumi
- King Gnu
- Kep1er
- Da Pump
- Yuzu

=== Special Award ===
- Sayuri Ishikawa
- Yoshimi Tendo
- Yumi Matsutoya

=== Japan Composer's Association Award ===
- Fujii Kawai

=== Special Achievement Award ===
- Man Arai (lyricist)
- Masao Saiki (composer)
- Teruhiko Saigō (singer, actor)
- Shinichi Sasaki (singer)
- Jirō Shinkawa (singer)
- Naoki Matsudaira (singer)
- Kōji Ryū (drummer, songwriter)

=== Special International Music Award ===
- Seventeen
