= Hiromi Yanagihara =

Japanese singer and actress (1979–1999)

Hiromi Yanagihara 柳原 尋美
- Born: October 19, 1979
- Died: July 16, 1999 (aged 19)
- Occupations: Singer; actress
- Musical career
- Genres: J-pop
- Years active: 1999
- Label: Zetima
- Formerly of: Country Musume
- Website: Hello! Project.com

Hiromi Yanagihara (柳原 尋美, Yanagihara Hiromi; October 19, 1979 – July 16, 1999) was a Japanese singer and actress. She was a founding member of Hello! Project J-pop group Country Musume. She joined Country Musume in 1999 along with Rinne Toda and Azusa Kobayashi. On July 16, 1999, Yanagihara was killed in a car accident, one week before the group's first release, Futari no Hokkaidou on July 23, 1999.

== Acts ==
=== Movies ===
- 1998 – Morning Keiji ~Daite Hold on Me!~ (モーニング刑事。～抱いてHold on Me!～, Morning Detective ~Hold on Me Hold on Me!~)

=== TV shows ===
- 1999-07-13 – Idol o Sagase

=== Dramas ===
- 1998-04-06 – Taiyō Musume to Umi (太陽娘と海, Sun Daughter and the Sea)
- 1998-07-09 – Kaze no Musumetachi (風の娘たち, Daughters of Wind)
- 1998-10-11 – Wine Musume Koi Monogatari (ワイン娘恋物語, Wine Daughter Love Story)
