= Nanami Yanagawa =

Japanese pop singer

Nanami Yanagawa 梁川奈々美
- Born: January 6, 2002 (age 24)
- Origin: Kanagawa Prefecture, Japan
- Genres: Pop
- Occupation: Singer
- Years active: 2013–2019
- Labels: Up-Front Works; Zetima
- Formerly of: Hello Pro Kenshuusei; Country Girls; Juice=Juice

Nanami Yanagawa (梁川奈々美; born January 6, 2002) is a former Japanese pop singer, a member of Japanese girl group Juice=Juice and a member of Country Girls.

== Biography ==
Nanami was born on January 6, 2002, in Kanagawa, Japan.

== Overview ==
On November 5, it was announced at Country Girls' first anniversary event that she would be joining the group alongside Musubu Funaki.

On June 9, 2017, it was announced that Country Girls would be ceasing regular activities and that three of the members, including Nanami, would be transferring to other Hello! Project groups. On June 26, through a special episode of Hello! Project Station, it was revealed that Nanami would be joining Juice=Juice as a new second generation member alongside Ruru Dambara. She graduated from Hello! Project on March 11, 2019.

== Hello! Project groups and units ==
- Hello Pro Kenshuusei (2013–2015)
- Country Girls (2015–2019)
- Juice=Juice (2017–2019)

== Discography ==
for Nanami Yanagawa's releases with Country Girls and Juice=Juice, see Country Girls (band)#Discography and Juice=Juice#Discography.

== Filmography ==
Title	Album details	Peak chart positions	
Title	Album details	JPN	
Title	Album details	DVD	Blu-ray
My Ashioto (わたしのあしおと)	Released: February 27, 2019; Label: Hachama; Formats: Blu-ray	—	73
