= Musubu Funaki =

Japanese pop singer (born 2002)

Musubu Funaki (船木結)
- Origin: Osaka Prefecture, Japan
- Genres: Pop
- Occupation: Singer
- Years active: 2013–2020
- Labels: Pony Canyon; Zetima

Musubu Funaki (船木結) is a Japanese pop singer. She is a former 6th generation member of Japanese girl group Angerme and a former member of Country Girls.

== Overview ==
In 2013, Funaki participated in Morning Musume's first 12th generation audition and made it to the final round, but was not chosen to join the group. On December 7, Funaki was officially introduced as a Hello Pro Kenshuusei at the Hello Pro Kenshuusei Happyoukai 2013 ~12gatsu no Nama Tamago Show!~ alongside Risa Yamaki, Yumei Yokogawa, Kisora Niinuma, Hirona Oura, Ruru Danbara and Akane Haga.

On November 5, it was announced at Country Girls' first anniversary event that she would be joining the group alongside Nanami Yanagawa.

On June 9, 2017, it was announced that Country Girls would be ceasing regular activities and that three of the members, including Musubu, would be transferring to other Hello! Project groups. On June 26, through a special episode of Hello! Project Station, it was revealed that Musubu would be joining Angerme as a new 6th generation member alongside Ayano Kawamura. She will begin performing with group in the Hello! Project 2017 SUMMER concert tour, while being a concurrent member of Country Girls at the same time.

She retired from the entertainment world in December 2020.

== Hello! Project groups and units ==
- Hello Pro Kenshuusei (2013–2015)
- Country Girls (2015–2019)
- Angerme (2017–2020)

== Discography ==
for Musubu Funaki's releases with Country Girls and Angerme, see Country Girls (band)#Discography and Angerme#Discography.

== Filmography ==
Title	Album details	Peak chart positions	
Title	Album details	JPN	
Title	Album details	DVD	Blu-ray
Raindrop	Released: September 27, 2017; Label: Zetima; Formats: DVD	—	78
Life-size (等身大)	Released: September 12, 2018; Label: Zetima; Formats: DVD	—	34
