= Country Girls (band) =

Japanese idol group

Country Girls カントリー・ガールズ
- Also known as: Country Musume, Kan Musume, Kan Musu, Country Musume ni Rika Ishikawa, Country Musume ni Konno to Fujimoto
- Origin: Japan
- Genres: Pop; dance-pop; electropop
- Years active: 1999–2009 (Country Musume); 2014-2019 (Country Girls)
- Label: zetima
- Past members: As Country Musume: Asami Kimura; Miuna Saito; Miki Fujimoto; Asami Konno; Rika Ishikawa; Rinne Toda; Azusa Kobayashi; Hiromi Yanagihara; Mai Satoda; As Country Girls: Uta Shimamura; Manaka Inaba; Momoko Tsugunaga; Nanami Yanagawa; Risa Yamaki; Chisaki Morito; Mai Ozeki; Musubu Funaki
- Website: Profile on Hello! Project Official Website

Country Musume (カントリー娘。, Kantorī Musume) was a Japanese female idol music group that is a part of Hello! Project.

On November 5, 2014, Country Musume was rebooted and renamed Country Girls (カントリー・ガールズ, Kantorī Gāruzu) with new members.

== History ==
=== Country Musume era ===
Country Musume was formed in 1999 and was termed as "Country Girls from Hokkaidō." The initial group consisted of native members of Hokkaidō, Rinne Toda, Azusa Kobayashi, and Hiromi Yanagihara.

Before the release of their first single in July 1999, Hiromi Yanagihara died in a car accident. After the accident, Azusa Kobayashi departed from the group and Rinne Toda carried on as a solo artist and released two singles under the "Country Musume" name by herself. In the summer of 2000, Asami Kimura joined the group and the duo released one more single.

Their popularity rose when Morning Musume's Rika Ishikawa—who is from Kanagawa—was lent to the group in April 2001. Country Musume had their first charting single in Japan with the release of "Hajimete no Happy Birthday." The trio, under the name "Country Musume ni Rika Ishikawa," released two singles and an album. Early in 2002, Mai Satoda was recruited to the group, although she initially auditioned to be a Morning Musume member.

The quartet released one single before Toda, the remaining original member bid farewell at the end of 2002. Afterwards, Kimura, Ishikawa, and Satoda released one more single.

In mid-2003, Country Musume had a major shift in its roster. Miuna Saito, who is from Shizuoka, was recruited to the group. Instead of Rika Ishikawa, the group featured Asami Konno and Miki Fujimoto, who are both Morning Musume and Hokkaidō natives. In this new formation (named "Country Musume ni Konno to Fujimoto"), the quintet has released three singles. In 2004, Country Musume (except the featured singers) participated in the fifth edition of Hello! Project's Folk Song series, where various H!P artists sang covers of Japanese and Western folk songs.

Asami Kimura and Miuna Saito graduated from Country Musume and Hello! Project on its 10th anniversary concert on January 28, 2007, leaving Satoda as the only remaining member.

=== Country Girls era ===
On February 11, 2014, it was announced during the Hello! Project 2014 WINTER ~GOiSU MODE~ concert held at Sendai Sun Plaza Hall that audition applications for Country Musume would be accepted until March 31, 2014. On August 7, it was announced that the Country Musume audition has come to an end without any additions.

On November 5, 2014, it was announced that Hello! Pro Kenshūsei members Risa Yamaki and Manaka Inaba, Morning Musume '14 auditionees Chisaki Morito, Uta Shimamura, and Mai Ozeki were selected to join Country Musume. Berryz Kobo member Momoko Tsugunaga was also added to the group to become their "playing manager," while Mai Satoda takes the role of "supervisor." It was also announced that Country Musume was renamed to Country Girls, hoping for the group to attract fans from overseas.

On March 25, 2015, Country Musume released their first single as Country Girls and their twelfth single overall with "Itōshikutte Gomen ne / Koi Dorobō".

On June 12, 2015, Uta Shimamura resigned from Country Girls due to issues between Up-Front and Uta's parents regarding the terms of her contract. Country Girls will continue as a five-member group, excluding group supervisor, Mai Satoda.

On June 24, Country Girls performed at the TV Tokyo Music Festival(2) along many other artists, including Morning Musume '15 and Morning Musume OG.

On August 5, Country Girls released their 2nd single "Wakatteiru no ni Gomen ne / Tamerai Summer Time."

On November 5, during Country Girls' first anniversary event in Shinjuku, it was announced that Funaki Musubu and Yanagawa Nanami would be joining the group.

On December 2, Country Girls performed at the UPDATE girls LIVE, alongside idol groups, Lyrical School and Tokyo Performance Doll.

On February 9, during the 67th Sapporo Snow Festival, Country Girls performed a special live entitled 'Country Girls Boogie Woogie LIVE'. It took place in Odori Park in front of the HTB Snow Square.

On February 18, Country Girls performed a joint live with Idol Renaissance for the DOUBLE COLOR session11 at Shinjuku BLAZE.

On February 28, Country Girls performed at the SKY PerfecTV! Ongakusai 2016.

On March 9, Country Girls released their 3rd single "Boogie Woogie LOVE / Koi wa Magnet / Ranrarun ~Anata ni Muchuu~". It is Yanagawa Nanami and Funaki Musubu's debut single.

On April 28, it was announced that Inaba Manaka would be taking a break from Country Girls' activities due to asthma. After consulting with her doctors, it was initially decided that she would be returning to Country Girls when she recovered from her illness. However, on August 4, she graduated from the group.

On September 28, Country Girls released their 4th single "Dou Datte Ii no / Namida no Request."

In November 5, during the Country Girls Live Tour 2016, Fuyu day concert at Shinjuku ReNY, Country Girls' second anniversary, Tsugunaga announced that she will be graduating from the group and Hello! Project on June 30, 2017.

On November 19, 2019, it was announced that all four members will be graduating from the group and Country Girls will suspend all activity. A final performance was held in December 26 at LINE CUBE SHIBUYA.

== Members ==
=== Country Girls ===
==== Former ====
The group was supervised by Mai Satoda (a former member of Country Musume)

- Uta Shimamura
- Manaka Inaba (Former later member of Juice=Juice)
- Momoko Tsugunaga (Former member of Berryz Kobo)
- Nanami Yanagawa (Former concurrent member of Juice=Juice)
- Risa Yamaki (Former concurrent member of College Cosmos)
- Chisaki Morito (Former concurrent member of Morning Musume)
- Mai Ozeki
- Musubu Funaki (Former concurrent member of Angerme)

=== Country Musume ===
==== Former ====
- Rinne Toda
- Azusa Kobayashi
- Hiromi Yanagihara
- Asami Kimura
- Mai Satoda
- Miuna Saito

== Discography ==
=== Country Musume ===
==== Albums ====
#	Title	Release date	Members
1	Country Musume Daizenshu 1 (カントリー娘。大全集 ①)	December 12, 2001	Toda, Kimura, Ishikawa
2	Country Musume Daizenshu 2 (カントリー娘。大全集 ②)	August 23, 2006	Kimura, Satoda, Saito
3	Country Musume Mega Best (カントリー娘。メガベスト)	December 10, 2008	Satoda

==== Singles ====
No. Overall	No. by Name	Title	Release date	Oricon Weekly Singles Chart	Members
1	1	"Futari no Hokkaido" (二人の北海道)	July 23, 1999	-	Yanagihara, Kobayashi and Toda
2	2	"Yukigeshiki" (雪景色)	November 30, 1999	-	Toda
3	3	"Hokkaido Shalala" (北海道シャララ)	April 27, 2000	-	Toda
4	4	"Koi ga Suteki na Kisetsu" (恋がステキな季節)	July 31, 2000	-	Toda and Kimura
Country Musume ni Ishikawa Rika
5	1	"Hajimete no Happy Birthday" (初めてのハッピーバースディ!)	April 18, 2001	4	Toda, Kimura and Ishikawa
6	2	"Koibito wa Kokoro no Ōendan" (恋人は心の応援団)	October 17, 2001	6	Toda, Kimura and Ishikawa
7	3	"Iroppoi Onna ~Sexy Baby~" (色っぽい女 ～Sexy Baby～)	April 17, 2002	4	Toda, Kimura, Satoda and Ishikawa
8	4	"Bye Bye Saigo no Yoru" (Bye Bye 最後の夜)	November 13, 2002	8	Kimura, Satoda and Ishikawa
Country Musume ni Konno to Fujimoto
9	1	"Uwaki na Honey Pie" (浮気なハニーパイ)	July 24, 2003	7	Kimura, Satoda, Saito, Konno and Fujimoto
10	2	"Senpai ~Love Again~" (先輩 ～Love Again～)	December 5, 2003	15	Kimura, Satoda, Saito, Konno and Fujimoto
11	3	"Shining Itoshiki Anata" (シャイニング 愛しき貴方)	August 4, 2004	13	Kimura, Satoda, Saito, Konno and Fujimoto

==== DVD ====
- 2003-11-17 Country Musume Single V Clips 1 (カントリー娘。シングルVクリップス 1)

=== Country Girls ===
==== Studio albums ====
Title	Album details	Peak chart positions
Title	Album details	JPN
Title	Album details	Album
Momoko Tsugunaga Idol Jyugoshunen kinen Album♡Arigatou Otamomochi♡ (嗣永桃子アイドル15周年記念アルバム♡ありがとう おとももち♡)	Released: June 28, 2017; Label: PICCOLO TOWN; Formats: CD, digital download	19
Seasons	Released: March 6, 2019; Label: Zetima; Formats: CD, digital download	63
Country Girls Daizenshu 1 (カントリー・ガールズ大全集 ①)	Released: December 4, 2019; Label: Zetima; Formats: CD, digital download	22

==== Singles ====
Title	Album details	Peak chart positions
Title	Album details	JPN
Title	Album details	Single
Itōshikutte Gomen ne / Koi Dorobō (愛しくてごめんね／恋泥棒)	Released: March 25, 2015; Label: Zetima; Formats: CD, digital download	3
Wakatteiru no ni Gomen ne / Tamerai Summer Time (わかっているのにごめんね／ためらいサマータイム)	Released: August 5, 2015; Label: Zetima; Formats: CD, digital download	4
Boogie Woogie LOVE / Koi wa Magnet / Ranrarun ~Anata ni Muchuu (ブギウギLOVE／恋はマグネット／ランラルン ~あなたに夢中~)	Released: March 9, 2016; Label: Zetima; Formats: CD, digital download	2
Dou Datte Ii no / Namida no Request (どーだっていいの／涙のリクエスト)	Released: September 28, 2016; Label: Zetima; Formats: CD, digital download	4
Good Boy Bad Girl / Peanut Butter Jelly Love (Good Boy Bad Girl／ピーナッツバタージェリーラブ)	Released: February 8, 2017; Label: Zetima; Formats: CD, digital download	5
Konamaiki Girl (小生意気ガール)	Released: August 11, 2017; Label: Up-Front Works; Formats: digital download	—
Kaite wa keshite no “I Love You” (書いては消しての “I Love You”)	Released: December 24, 2017; Label: Up-Front Works; Formats: digital download	—
Matenai After Five / Kasa wo Sasu Senpai (待てないアフターファイブ／傘をさす先輩)	Released: August 24, 2018; Label: Up-Front Works; Formats: digital download	—
One Summer Night ~Manatsu no Kesshin~ / Natsuiro no Palette (One Summer Night〜真夏の決心〜／夏色のパレット)	Released: August 24, 2019; Label: Up-Front Works; Formats: digital download	—
