= Rosy Chronicle =

Japanese idol girl group

- Origin: Japan
- Genre: J-pop
- Years active: 2024–present
- Labels: Up-Front Works; Zetima
- Members: Honoka Hashida; Hinoha Yoshida; Karin Onoda; Ayana Murakoshi; Hasumi Uemura; Yulia Matsubara; Hana Shimakawa; Rena Kamimura; Yume Soma
- Website: www.helloproject.com/rosychronicle/

Rosy Chronicle (ロージークロニクル, Rōjī Kuronikuru), is a Japanese idol girl group that formed in June 2024. They released their debut single, "Heirasshai! – Nippon de Aimashō / Ubu to Zuru", in March 2025.

== History ==
=== 2023–present: Formation and debut ===
On May 23, 2023, Hello! Project announced that they would be forming a new girl group. Rosy Chronicle's final line-up and name were announced on June 16, 2024. Rosy Chronicle debuted on March 19, 2025, with the single "Heirasshai! – Nippon de Aimashō / Ubu to Zuru". On July 23, they will release their second single "Natsu no Inazuma / Gao Gao Gao".

== Members ==
- Honoka Hashida (橋田歩果) - Leader
- Hinoha Yoshida (吉田姫杷)
- Karin Onoda (小野田華凜)
- Ayana Murakoshi (村越彩菜)
- Hasumi Uemura (植村葉純)
- Yulia Matsubara (松原ユリヤ)
- Hana Shimakawa (島川波菜)
- Rena Kamimura (上村麗菜)
- Yume Soma (相馬優芽)

== Discography ==
=== Singles ===
Title	Year	Peak chart positions		Album
Title	Year	JPN	JPN Hot	Album
"Heirasshai! – Nippon de Aimashō / Ubu to Zuru" (へいらっしゃい!～ニッポンで会いましょう～/ウブとズル)	2025	2	4	Non-album singles
"Natsu no Inazuma / Gao Gao Gao" (夏のイナズマ/ガオガオガオ)	2025	4	12	Non-album singles
"Misery (Ai no Tenbin) / Nanto ka Narudesho" (Misery ～愛の天秤～/なんとかなるでしょ)	2026	5	11	Non-album singles
"Datte Daikyo Jan / Najiraretatte Nakenai Aisaretatte Nakenai" (だって大凶じゃん/なじられたって泣けない 愛されたって泣けない)	2026	2	8	Non-album singles
