= Irori Maeda =

Irori Maeda 前田彩里
- Also known as: Maeda Gurōbā Iror, Irorin
- Born: Hyogo Prefecture
- Genres: Japanese pop music
- Occupation: Japanese idol
- Years active: 2004–present

Irori Maeda (前田 彩里, Maeda Irori, born 7 May 1997 in Hyogo) is a Japanese pop singer and former member of the Japanese idol group AKBN0 (later known as N Zero). She is a former Hello Pro Egg member. She joined Hello! Project in 2006 as a member of Hello! Pro Egg. In 2011, she left Hello Project for AKBN0. She left AKBN0 in 2012.

== Biography ==
Maeda was added to Hello! Pro Egg in 2006 by Tsunku and made her first appearance at a Cute concert where she was introduced to the fans.

Maeda left Hello! Pro Egg and Hello! Project in order to audition for AKBN0. She passed the auditions, alongside Riyon Oosumi, and joined as a fifth generation member, and now goes by the stage name Maeda Clover Irori. She left AKBN0 in spring 2012.
