= Radek Fukala =

Czech historian (born 1963)

Radek Fukala (born 1963 in Karviná, Moravian-Silesian Region of the Czech Republic) is a Czech historian.

He is a Silesian, who graduated at University of Ostrava. He gained Ph.D. from Masaryk University. In 2002 he passed his habilitation at Charles University in Prague.

== Works ==
- Role Jana Jiřího Krnovského ve stavovských hnutích., Opava 1997.
- Manýrismus a globální krize 17. století?, Opava 2000.
- Třicetiletá válka. Konflikt, který změnil Evropu. Opava, 2001.
- Stavovská politika na Opavsku v letech 1490-1631. Opava 2004.
- Sen o odplatě. Dramata třicetileté války., Praha 2005.
- Jan Jiří Krnovský. Stavovské povstání a zápas s Habsburky. České Budějovice 2005.
- Hohenzollernové v evropské politice 16.století. Mezi Ansbachem, Krnovem a Královcem (1523–1603)., Praha 2005.
- Slezsko neznámá země Koruny české. Knížecí a stavovské Slezsko do roku 1740, České Budějovice 2007.
- Poděbradové. Rod českomoravských pánů, kladských hrabat a slezských knížat, Praha 2008.
