= Fuka (surname) =

Fuka (feminine: Fuková) is a Czech surname. It was probably derived either from the Czech verb foukat ('to blow') or from the old Czech word fuka (meaning 'slit'). Notable people with the surname include:

- Eva Fuka (1927–2015), Czech-American photographer
- František Fuka (born 1968), Czech computer programmer and musician

== See also ==
- Fukala, a Czech surname
