= Juice=Juice =

Japanese girl group

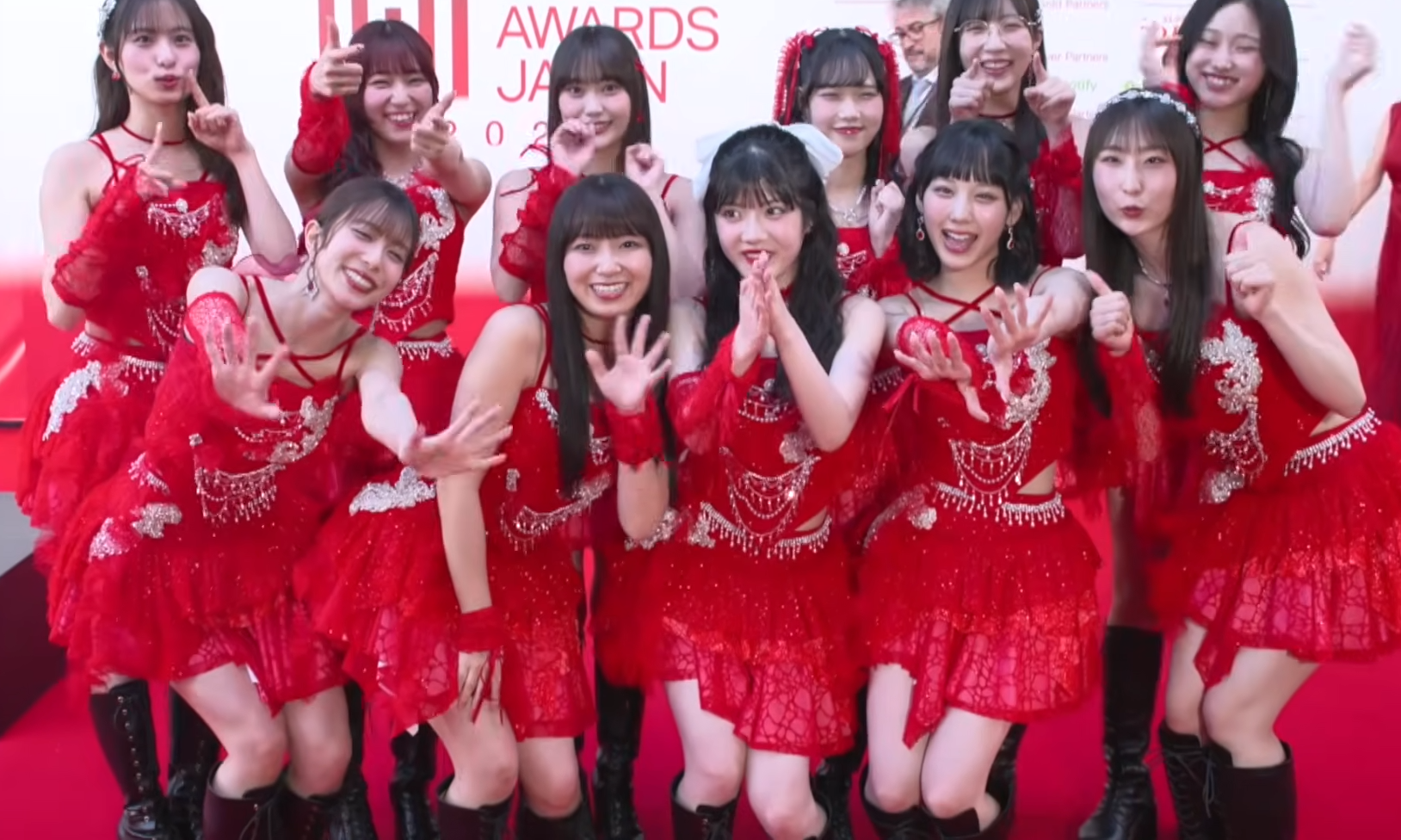
- Juice=Juice at the 2026 Music Awards Japan

Background information
- Origin: Japan
- Genres: J-pop; pop; dance-pop; electropop
- Years active: 2013–present
- Labels: Up-Front Works; Pony Canyon
- Members: Ruru Dambara; Rei Inoue; Yume Kudo; Riai Matsunaga; Ichika Arisawa; Risa Irie; Kisaki Ebata; Sakura Ishiyama; Akari Endo; Mifu Kawashima; Niina Hayashi
- Past members: Yuka Miyazaki; Tomoko Kanazawa; Sayuki Takagi; Aina Ōtsuka; Karin Miyamoto; Nanami Yanagawa; Manaka Inaba; Akari Uemura
- Website: www.helloproject.com/juicejuice

Juice=Juice, pronounced "Juice Juice", is an eleven-member Japanese idol girl group formed in 2013. The group originally consisted of six trainee members of Hello! Project. They have released three studio albums and seventeen singles.

Juice=Juice was nominated for the 2013 TBS Japan Record Award in the category of "Best Newcomer" and won a "New Artist" Award. In February 2016, Juice=Juice starred as a fictionalized version of the group in a Japanese drama called Budokan.

== History ==
=== 2013: Formation and debut ===
The formation of the group was announced on February 3, 2013, at a Hello! Project concert held at the Main Hall of the Fukuoka Convention Center. It was revealed that the group would consist of six members: five Hello! Project trainees (Akari Uemura, Sayuki Takagi, Karin Miyamoto, Aina Ōtsuka, and Tomoko Kanazawa) and Yuka Miyazaki from Satoyama Movement, all of the groups under the umbrella of Up-Front Group management.

On February 25, it was announced that the group name is Juice=Juice and a concert series was launched on March 2 called Hello! Project Haru no Dai Kansha Hinamatsuri Festival 2013. In these concerts, the group premiered their upcoming single "Watashi ga Iu Mae ni Dakishimenakya ne". On September 11, they released their debut single which peaked at No. 2 on Oricon's weekly chart.

In November 2013, Juice=Juice was nominated for the 2013 TBS Japan Record Award in the category of "Best Newcomer" and won a "New Artist" Award. On December 5, Juice=Juice released their second single which included the songs "Ijiwaru Shinai de Dakishimete yo" and "Hajimete wo Keiken-chuu". It outperformed their prior release by selling 45,834 copies.

=== 2014–2015: Live tour and chart topper ===
On February 27, 2014, Juice=Juice released their first official group photo-book. Their third single was released on March 19, with the songs "Hadaka no Hadaka no Hadaka no KISS" and "Are Kore Shitai!". Two days later the group announced its first solo tour, Juice=Juice First Live Tour 2014 News=News ~Kakuchi yori Otodoke Shimasu!~, which performed from June to December.

On July 30, 2014, Juice=Juice released their fourth single, containing the songs "Black Butterfly" and "Kaze ni Fukarete". This was followed by another single on October 1, with "Senobi" and "Date ja nai yo Uchi no Jinsei wa".

Juice=Juice performed their first musical, Koisuru Hello Kitty, from November 19 to 24, 2014.

On April 8, 2015, Juice=Juice released their sixth single, containing the songs "Wonderful World" and "Ça va ? Ça va ?". It was their first single to reach No. 1 on the Oricon Weekly Chart, and the first to not be produced by Tsunku.

On May 2, during the opening concert of Juice=Juice First Live Tour 2015 ~Special Juice~, the group announced their first studio album First Squeeze! would be released on July 15. They also announced their goal to perform at Nippon Budokan in 2016, after building their fanbase by performing 220 shows across Japan.

On October 8, it was announced that Juice=Juice would be starring in a 2016 Fuji TV drama titled Budokan about a fictionalized version of the group called Next You which sought to appear at Nippon Budokan. During the production of the show, which began in November, many of Juice=Juice's lives, events, and appearances were conducted under the name Next You.

=== 2016–2017: Budokan, new line-up, and world tour ===
On February 3, 2016, Juice=Juice released their seventh single, under the name Next You, which contained the songs "Next is you!" and "Karada Dake ga Otona ni Nattan ja nai". On February 6, Budokan premiered on Fuji TV. Extended episodes with an additional 15 minutes of material followed on BS SKY PerfecTV! on February 10.

On May 4, it was announced that Juice=Juice were scheduled to perform a concert at Nippon Budokan on November 7, after completing 220 shows as part of the Live Mission 220 promotion.

On October 26, Juice=Juice released their eighth single, containing the songs "Dream Road ~Kokoro ga Odoridashiteru~", "KEEP ON Joshou Shikou!!" and "Ashita Yarou wa Bakayarou". A ninth single followed on April 26, 2017, with "Jidanda Dance" and "Feel! Kanjiru yo". This was followed by the digital release of "Goal ~Ashita wa Acchi da yo~" on May 19 and "Jouro" on June 16.

On June 26, 2017, it was announced that Nanami Yanagawa of Country Girls and Ruru Dambara had joined Juice=Juice and would appear with the group in the Hello! Project 2017 SUMMER concert tour and Juice=Juice LIVE AROUND 2017 ~Seven Horizon~. The first leg of the world tour ran from September 8 to October 1, 2017 with concerts in Mexico, England, France, Germany, Malaysia, Indonesia, and Taiwan. The second leg ran December 12 to 17 in South America.

On August 23, Juice=Juice released their digital single "Fiesta! Fiesta!", which was the first release of the seven-member lineup.

=== 2018–2025: New members ===
On April 18, 2018, Juice=Juice released their tenth single, which included the songs "SEXY SEXY", "Naite Ii yo" and "Vivid Midnight".

On June 13, it was revealed that Manaka Inaba had joined Juice=Juice as a new member and would appear with the group in the Hello! Project 20th Anniversary!! Hello! Project 2018 SUMMER concert tour.

On February 13, 2019, Juice=Juice released their eleventh single, containing the songs "Bi Tansan", "Potsuri to" and "Good Bye & Good Luck!". It was the group's first single with Manaka Inaba and its last with Nanami Yanagawa. This was followed on June 5 with another single, containing the songs " 'Hitori de Ikiraresō' tte Sore tte nē, Homote Iru no?" and "25-sai Eien Setsu".

On June 14, the group added Yume Kudo and Riai Matsunaga to its lineup.

On February 10, 2020, Karin Miyamoto announced that she will graduate from the group in June and focus on solo activities.

On April 1 it was announced that former Kobushi Factory member Rei Inoue would join the group, officially starting her activities after Karin Miyamoto's graduation.

On February 12, it was announced that Sayuki Takagi has left the group and Hello! Project.

On July 7, it was announced through Hello! Project Station that Hello! Project "Juice=Juice" "Tsubaki Factory" Goudou Shin Member Audition winner Risa Irie and Hello Pro Kenshuusei members Ichika Arisawa and Kisaki Ebata has joined the group as new members.

On October 6, Kanazawa Tomoko announced that she will be graduating from the group and Hello! Project on November 24 to focus on the treatment of her endometriosis.

On November 24, the group held their first concert at Yokohama Arena, titled Juice=Juice Concert 2021 ~FAMILIA~ Kanazawa Tomoko Final. This was also the first concert to feature the new members and Kanazawa's graduation concert. In the concert, Uemura Akari was chosen as the group's new leader following Kanazawa's graduation.

On December 22, the group is released their Plastic Love / Familia / Future Smile, which will be the first to feature the new members and Kanazawa's last.

On March 18, 2022, Manaka Inaba announced that she will graduate from the group on May 30 in the final concert of the Hello! Project 2022 Spring CITY CIRCUIT Juice=Juice CONCERT TOUR ~terzo~ at Nippon Budokan and focus on solo activities.

On April 20, Juice=Juice released their third studio album, terzo.

On June 29, it was announced through Hello! Project Station that Hello! Project "Juice=Juice" "Morning Musume" Goudou Shin Member Audition winner Akari Endo and Hello Pro Kenshuusei member Sakura Ishiyama has joined the group as new members.

On November 23, the group released their 16th single "Zenbu Kakete GO!! / Eeny Meeny Miny Moe ~Koi no Rival Sengen~". It is their first release to feature new members Sakura Ishiyama and Akari Endo.

On May 23, it was announced that Mifu Kawashima joined Juice=Juice as a new member.

On July 12, the group released their 17th single, "Pride Bright / FUNKY FLUSHIN'".

On August 16, it was announced that Akari Uemura will be graduating from the group and Hello! Project at the end of the group's upcoming spring concert tour in 2024.

On October 11, Juice=Juice released their first compilation album in commemoration of the group's 10th anniversary, Juicetory, featuring 2023 re-recordings of some of their representative songs.

From October 27 to November 12, Juice=Juice will be holding a special exhibition titled 10th de Kanpai!! in honor of the group's 10th anniversary.

On October 12, it was announced that Mifu Kawashima was diagnosed with sudden hearing loss as result of a medical examination. She was instructed by the doctor to undergo medical treatment and to also avoid work that involves loud noises, such as live performances, for the time being. As result, she will be absent from all activities until she recovers.

On May 15, the group will release their 18th single, "Tokyo Blur / Naimono Love / Oaiko". Mifu Kawashima would not participate on this single as she was diagnosed with sudden hearing loss and is on medical hiatus during the production of it.

On April 19, it was announced that Mifu Kawashima would be resuming activities with the opening concert of the Juice=Juice Concert Tour 2024 1-LINE on April 20 as her symptoms have eased and she was able to obtain the consent of her doctor to resume her activities. Her condition will continue to be monitored and precautions will be taken.

On June 8, it was announced that Ruru Dambara would become the new leader and Rei Inoue the new sub-leader of the group after Akari Uemura's graduation on June 14.

On July 1, it was announced that Risa Irie had been diagnosed with panic disorder and will be suspending activities for the time being in order to rest and go to the hospital to concentrate on her treatment. As a result, she will be absent from the Hello! Project 2024 Summer ALL OF US tour. Her eventual return in February of 2025 was announced December 27.

On February 26, they will release their 19th single, "Hatsukoi no Bourei / Kon'ya wa Hearty Party". Risa Irie was absent from filming the promotional video for "Kon'ya wa Hearty Party," but her vocals were recorded and she will otherwise be fully included in the single.

On June 23, it was announced at the Juice=Juice Concert Tour 2025 Crimson×Azure Special concert in Nippon Budokan that the Hello Pro Kenshuusei member Niina Hayashi has joined Juice=Juice as a new member.

== Members ==
=== Current ===
As of June 2024, the group consists of eleven members.

- Ruru Dambara (段原瑠々) (2017–present) – Leader
- Rei Inoue (井上玲音) (2020–present) – Sub-Leader and Former member of Magnolia Factory (2015–2020)
- Yume Kudo (工藤由愛) (2019–present)
- Riai Matsunaga (松永里愛) (2019–present)
- Ichika Arisawa (有澤一華) (2021–present)
- Risa Irie (入江里咲) (2021–present)
- Kisaki Ebata (江端妃咲) (2021–present)
- Sakura Ishiyama (石山咲良) (2022–present)
- Akari Endo (遠藤彩加里) (2022–present)
- Mifu Kawashima (川嶋美楓) (2023–present)
- Niina Hayashi (林仁愛) (2025–present)

=== Former ===
- Aina Ōtsuka (大塚愛菜) (2013)
- Nanami Yanagawa (梁川奈々美) (2017–2019)
- Yuka Miyazaki (宮崎由加) (2013–2019)
- Karin Miyamoto (宮本佳林) (2013–2020)
- Sayuki Takagi (高木紗友希) (2013–2021)
- Tomoko Kanazawa (金澤朋子) (2013–2021)
- Manaka Inaba (稲場愛香) (2018–2022) – Former member of Country Girls
- Akari Uemura (植村あかり) (2013–2024)

== Discography ==
=== Studio albums ===
Title	Album details	Peak chart positions	
Title	Album details	Oricon	Billboard
First Squeeze!	Released: July 15, 2015; Label: Hachama; Formats: CD, digital download	5	6
#2 ¡Una mas!	Released: August 1, 2018; Label: Hachama; Formats: CD, digital download	4	7
Terzo	Released: April 20, 2022; Label: Hachama; Formats: CD, digital download	1	1

=== Compilation albums ===
Title	Album details	Peak chart positions	
Title	Album details	Oricon	Billboard
Juicetory	Released: October 11, 2023; Label: Hachama; Formats: CD, digital download	4	4

=== Extended plays ===
Title	EP details	Peak chart positions	
Title	EP details	Oricon	Billboard
More! More! EP	Released: June 24, 2026; Label: Hachama; Formats: CD, digital download	3	8

=== Singles ===
Title	Year	Peak chart positions		Album
Title	Year	Oricon	JPN Billboard	Album
Indie singles
"Watashi ga Iu Mae ni Dakishimenakya ne" (私が言う前に抱きしめなきゃね)	2013	25	—	Non-album singles
"Samidare Bijo ga Samidareru" (さみだれ美女がさみだれる)	2013	153	—	Non-album singles
"Ten Made Nobore!" (天まで登れ!)	2013	—	—	First Squeeze!
Major singles
"Romance no Tochū / Watashi ga Iu Mae ni Dakishimenakya ne (Memorial Edit) / Samidare Bijo ga Samidareru (Memorial Edit)" (ロマンスの途中 / 私が言う前に抱きしめなきゃね (Memorial Edit) / 五月雨美女がさ乱れる (Memorial Edit))	2013	2	9	First Squeeze!
"Ijiwaru Shinaide Dakishimete yo / Hajimete o Keikenchū" (イジワルしないで 抱きしめてよ / 初めてを経験中)	2013	4	19	First Squeeze!
"Hadaka no Hadaka no Hadaka no Kiss / Are Kore Shitai!" (裸の裸の裸のKiss ／ アレコレしたい!)	2014	3	17	First Squeeze!
"Black Butterfly / Kaze ni Fukarete" (ブラックバタフライ / 風に吹かれて)	2014	4	18	First Squeeze!
"Senobi / Date ja Nai yo Uchi no Jinsei wa" (背伸び / 伊達じゃないようちの人生は)	2014	4	17	First Squeeze!
"Wonderful World / Ça va? Ça va?" (Wonderful World / How are you? How are you?)	2015	1	6	First Squeeze! and #2 ¡Una mas!
"Next is you! / Karada Dake ga Otona ni Nattan ja nai" (Next is you! / カラダだけが大人になったんじゃない)	2016	3	13	#2 ¡Una mas!
"Dream Road ~Kokoro ga Odaridashiteru~ / Keep On Joshou Shikou!! / Ashita Yarou wa Bakayarou" (Dream Road～心が躍り出してる～ / Keep On 上昇志向！！ / 明日やろうはバカやろう)	2016	5	6	#2 ¡Una mas!
"Jidanda Dance / Feel! Kanjiru yo" (地団駄ダンス / Feel！感じるよ)	2017	3	3	#2 ¡Una mas!
"Sexy Sexy / Naite ii yo / Vivid Midnight" (Sexy Sexy / 泣いていいよ / Vivid Midnight)	2018	3	3	#2 ¡Una mas!
"Bitansan / Potsuri to / Good Bye & Good Luck!" (微炭酸 / ポツリと / Good bye & Good luck!)	2019	3	3	Terzo
""Hitori de Ikiraresō" tte Sore tte nē, Homote Iru no? / 25-sai Eien Setsu" (「ひとりで生きられそう」って それってねぇ、褒めているの? / 25歳永遠説)	2019	3	7	Terzo
"Pop Music / Suki tte Itte yo" (ポップミュージック / 好きって言ってよ)	2020	3	8	Terzo
"Down Town / Ganbarenai yo" (Down Town / がんばれないよ)	2021	3	8	Terzo
"Plastic Love / Familia / Future Smile" (プラスティック・ラブ / Familia / Future Smile)	2021	3	8	Terzo
"Zenbu Kakete GO / Eeny Meeny Miny Moe ~Koi no Rival Sengen~" (全部賭けてGO / イニミニマニモ～恋のライバル宣言～)	2022	5	4	Non-album singles
"Pride Bright / Funky Flushin'" (プライド・ブライト / Funky Flushin')	2023	2	5	Non-album singles
"Tokyo Blur / Naimono Love / Oaiko" (トウキョウ・ブラー / ナイモノラブ / おあいこ)	2024	2	7	Non-album singles
"Hatsukoi no Bourei / Kon'ya wa Hearty Party" (初恋の亡霊/今夜はHearty Party)	2025	4	7	Non-album singles
"Shino Gono Iwazu Satto Wakarete Ageta / More! Mi Amore" (四の五の言わず颯と別れてあげた/盛れ!ミ・アモーレ)	2025	2	6	Non-album singles
"Shino Gono Iwazu Satto Wakarete Ageta / More! Mi Amore" (四の五の言わず颯と別れてあげた/盛れ!ミ・アモーレ)	2025	2	90	Non-album singles
"—" denotes a recording that did not chart or was not released in that territory.

== Awards and nominations ==
=== Japan Record Awards ===
The Japan Record Awards is a major music awards show held annually in Japan by the Japan Composer's Association.

Year	Nominee / work	Award	Result
2013	Juice=Juice	New Artist Award	Won
2013	Juice=Juice	Best New Artist Award	Nominated
