= Up-Front Group =

Japanese entertainment company

- Native name: アップフロントグループ
- Type: Kabushiki gaisha
- Industry: Music, entertainment
- Founded: 14 January 1983; 43 years ago (as Up-Front Agency Co., Ltd.); Tokyo, Japan
- Headquarters: Azabu-koei Building; 28-12 Higashi-Azabu Ichichōme, Minato-ku, Tokyo, Japan 106-0044
- Key people: Naoki Yamazaki (chairman and representative director); Yukio Seto (president and executive director); Junichiro Iwata (managing director)
- Subsidiaries: Up-Front Promotion; Up-Front Works; Up-Front Books; Up-Front International; Up-Front DC; Up-Front Hawaii etc.
- Website: www.ufg.co.jp

Up-Front Group Co., Ltd. (株式会社アップフロントグループ, Kabushiki gaisha Appu-Furonto Gurūpu) is a Japanese entertainment company specializing in artists' development, management, and production.

It is structured as a holding company for various entertainment companies that represent various areas within the industry and work with each other.

Its subsidiaries include the talent agency Up-Front Promotion that trains and manages female idol singers and the music and video production company Up-Front Works that operates such record labels as Zetima, Piccolo Town, Hachama, Rice Music. Up-Front Promotion idols release their music through Up-Front Works' in-house labels. Moreover, Up-Front Works issues idols and non-idols affiliated with other talent agencies belonging to Up-Front Group, such as J.P Room and Up-Front Create.

== Subsidiaries ==
- Up-Front Promotion
- J.P Room
- Up-Front Create
- Up-Front Trend
- Up-Front Works

etc.

== Up-Front Promotion ==
Up-Front Promotion Co., Ltd. (株式会社アップフロントプロモーション) is a talent agency formerly known as Up-Front Agency. All musical artists and groups under Up-Front Promotion are collectively known as Hello! Project.

The list of artists under Up-Front Promotion includes:

Groups

- Morning Musume
- Angerme
- Juice=Juice
- Camellia Factory
- Beyooooonds
  - Chica#Tetsu
  - Rain Forest River Ocean
  - SeasoningS
- Ocha Norma
- Rosy Chronicle

Soloists

- Moe Kamikokuryō
- Rika Shimakura

Trainees

- Hello Pro Kenshūsei

== J.P Room ==
J.P Room Inc. (ジェイピィールーム) is a talent agency headquartered in Shinagawa-ku, Tokyo. The list of artists under J.P Room includes the following former Hello! Project members:

Soloists

- Kiki Asakura
- Mizuki Fukumura
- Manaka Inaba
- Ayumi Ishida

- Karin Miyamoto
- Yuka Miyazaki
- Chisaki Morito
- Mai Ozeki

- Rikako Sasaki
- Masaki Satō
- Akari Takeuchi
- Akari Uemura

Former

- Noriko Katō

== Up-Front Create ==
Up-Front Create Co., Ltd. (アップフロントクリエイト) is a talent agency headquartered in Tokyo. The list of artists under Up-Front Create includes:

Male groups

- Brothers 5

Female soloists

- Chisato Moritaka
- Masako Komata
- Noriko Katō
- Maya Hayashi
- Junko Shinoda
- Shoko Aida (ex-Wink)
- Moemi Hasegawaja (ex-Bitter & Sweet)
- Junko Yanagisawa

Ex-Hello! Project

- Yuko Nakazawa
- Kaori Iida
- Natsumi Abe
- Kei Yasuda
- Mari Yaguchi
- Rika Ishikawa
- Ai Takahashi
- Mai Satoda
- Reina Tanaka
- Miyabi Natsuyaki
- Maasa Sudō
- Yurina Kumai – also Tateoka
- Maimi Yajima
- Saki Nakajima
- Airi Suzuki
- Erina Mano – also Just Pro
- Rina Katsuta
- Riko Yamagishi

Ex-Hello! Pro Egg (ex-Ciao Bella Cinquetti)

- Aina Hashimoto
- Kanami Morozuka
- Yuki Gotō

Female (partnership)

- Maki Watase (Lindberg) – Tinka Tinka
- Nozomi Tsuji – YU-M Entertainment
- Miki Fujimoto – Just Pro
- Haruna Iikubo – Just Pro

== Up-Front Trend ==
Up-Front Trend Co., Ltd. (アップフロントトレンド), formerly Up-Front Style, is a talent agency headquartered in Minato-ku, Tokyo that specializes in voice actors.

== Up-Front Works ==
Up-Front Works Co., Ltd. (株式会社アップフロントワークス) is a music and video production and sales company that works with artists affiliated with Up-Front Group and its partners. It was created in 2004 by merging the record labels Zetima, Hachama and Piccolo Town. All three continued to operate as Up-Front Works' in-house labels.

The list of artists whose music is released by Up-Front Works includes those under the talent agencies Up-Front Promotion, J.P Room, Up-Front Create, etc.

Up-Front Works operates or operated the following record labels:

=== Zetima ===
Zetima
- Parent company: Up-Front Works Co. Ltd.
- Founded: May 1993 (as One Up Music)
- Distributor: Sony Music Entertainment Japan
- Genre: J-pop; rock; kayōkyoku; enka
- Country of origin: Japan
- Location: Tokyo

Zetima (ゼティマ) was originally founded in May 1993 as One Up Music (ワン・アップ・ミュージック, Wan Appu Myūjikku), a joint venture between the Up-Front Group and Warner Music Japan. In April 1998, Up-Front merged One Up with Y.J. Sounds to form Zetima. At the same time, Up-Front ended its distribution deal with Warner Music Japan and switched to Sony Music Entertainment Japan.

Artists

- Shoko Aida
- Beyooooonds
- Camellia Factory
- Hello! Project shuffle units
- Akira Inaba
- Jōjō Gundan
- Kan
- Aya Matsuura
- Chisato Moritaka
- Morning Musume
- Takui Nakajima
- Yuko Nakazawa
- Ocha Norma
- Pink Cres.
- Rosy Chronicle
- Airi Suzuki

Former artists

- Buono!
- Cute
- Country Girls
- Magnolia Factory
- Dream Morning Musume
- Lovendor
- Ongaku Gatas
- Sharam Q

=== Hachama ===
Hachama
- Parent company: Up-Front Works Co. Ltd.
- Founded: April 2001
- Distributor: Pony Canyon
- Genre: J-pop; rock
- Country of origin: Japan
- Location: Tokyo

Hachama (ハチャマ) has a distribution deal with Pony Canyon.

Artists

- Angerme
- Juice=Juice
- Akari Uemura

Former artists

- Alma Kaminiito
- Eric Fukusaki
- Gatas Brilhantes H.P.
- Yuubi Matsui
- Peaberry

=== Piccolo Town ===
Piccolo Town
- Parent company: Up-Front Works Co. Ltd.
- Founded: April 2001
- Distributor: Pony Canyon
- Genre: J-pop; folk; children's
- Country of origin: Japan
- Location: Tokyo

Piccolo Town (ピッコロタウン, Pikkoro Taun) had a distribution deal with King Records from April 2001 to August 2013, when it switched to Pony Canyon in September 2013.

Artists

- Bitter & Sweet

Former artists

- Aa!
- Berryz Kobo
- Ciao Bella Cinquetti
- Gomattō
- Maki Goto
- Sayaka Ichii
- Yui Okada
- v-u-den
- ZYX

=== Rice Music ===
Rice Music
- Parent company: Up-Front Works Co. Ltd.
- Founded: March 1995 (as Y.J. Sounds)
- Distributor: Pony Canyon
- Genre: Kayōkyoku; enka
- Country of origin: Japan
- Location: Tokyo

Rice Music (ライス・ミュージック, Raisu Myūjikku) was originally founded in March 1995 as Y.J. Sounds (Y.J.サウンズ, Wai Jei Saunzu). After being absorbed into Zetima in 1998, the label was resurrected in September 2004 to focus on kayōkyoku and enka. Like Piccolo Town, Rice Music had a distribution deal with King Records from September 2004 to August 2013, when it switched to Pony Canyon in September 2013.

Artists

- Hirofumi Banba
- Takao Horiuchi
- Akira Kagawa
- Jirō Sugita
- Gen Takayama
- Masayuki Yuhara

Former artists

- Akira Fuse
- Sanae Jōnouchi
- Yuki Maeda
- Nori Yamaguchi

=== Up-Front Works (record label) ===
Up-Front Works
- Parent company: Up-Front Works Co. Ltd.
- Founded: March 2004
- Genre: J-pop
- Country of origin: Japan
- Location: Tokyo

Up-Front Works (アップフロントワークス, Appu Furonto Wākusu) is Up-Front Group's in-house label that specializes in limited edition releases that are sold either online or exclusively at music chains such as Tower Records. The label previously had distribution deals with Pony Canyon, Daiki Sound, and Universal Music Japan before 2019.

Artists

- Natsumi Abe
- Akira Inaba
- You Kikkawa
- Hello! Project
- Kamiishinaka Kana
- Sayumi Michishige
- Karin Miyamoto
- Chisato Moritaka
- Saki Nakajima
- Asahi Tasaki
- Temiyamn
- Maimi Yajima

=== Up-Front Indies ===
Up-Front Indies
- Parent company: Up-Front Works Co. Ltd.
- Founded: May 2019
- Genre: J-pop; rock; soundtrack
- Country of origin: Japan
- Location: Tokyo

Up-Front Indies (アップフロントインディーズ, Appu Furonto Indīzu) is Up-Front Group's indie in-house label founded in May 2019.

Artists

- Hello Pro Kenshusei

=== Chichūkai Label ===
Chichūkai Label
- Parent company: Up-Front Works Co. Ltd.
- Founded: 2003
- Defunct: December 2009
- Distributor: Epic Records Japan
- Genre: Classic, Euro-enka
- Country of origin: Japan
- Location: Tokyo

Chichūkai Label (地中海 Label, lit. 'The Mediterranean Sea Label') was founded in 2003, with music inspired by those of the countries by the Mediterranean Sea, most prominently France, Italy and Greece, or even cover versions of songs from those countries. The label was handled by Epic Records Japan until December 2009, when Up-Front consolidated it with Zetima.

Former artists

- Shoko Aida
- Kaori Iida
- Akira Inaba
- Yasuko Naito
- Ruca
- Hidemi Sasaki

== Former artists ==
=== Affiliated with Up-Front Promotion ===
- Michiyo Heike (1997–2001)
- Morning Musume
  - Asuka Fukuda (1997–1999)
  - Aya Ishiguro (1997–2000)
  - Sayaka Ichii (1998–2000)
  - Yuko Nakazawa (1997–2009)
  - Maki Goto (1999–2007)
  - Kei Yasuda (1998–2003)
  - Natsumi Abe (1997–2004)
  - Nozomi Tsuji (2000–2004)
  - Ai Kago (2000–2004)
  - Kaori Iida (1997–2005)
  - Mari Yaguchi (1998–2005)
  - Rika Ishikawa (2000–2005)
  - Asami Konno (2001–2006)
  - Makoto Ogawa (2001–2006)
  - Hitomi Yoshizawa (2000–2007)
  - Miki Fujimoto (2003–2007)
  - Koharu Kusumi (2005–2009)
  - Eri Kamei (2003–2010)
  - Jun Jun (2007–2010)
  - Lin Lin (2007–2010)
  - Ai Takahashi (2001–2011)
  - Risa Niigaki (2001–2012)
  - Reina Tanaka (2003–2013)
  - Sayumi Michishige (2003–2014)
  - Kanon Suzuki (2011–2016)
  - Haruka Kudo (2011–2017)
  - Aika Mitsui (2007–2018)
  - Riho Sayashi (2011–2018)
  - Haruna Ogata (2014–2018)
  - Haruna Iikubo (2011–2018)
  - Masaki Sato (2011–2021)
  - Chisaki Morito (2017–2022)
  - Kaede Kaga (2016–2022)
  - Mizuki Fukumura (2011–2023)
  - Ayumi Ishida (2011–2024)
  - Erina Ikuta (2011–2025)
- Chinatsu Miyoshi (1999–2000)
- T&C Bomber (1999–2000)
  - Atsuko Inaba (1999–2009)
- Melon Kinenbi (1999–2010)
- Aya Matsuura (2000–2017)
- Sheki-Dol (2000–2002)
- W (2004–2006)
  - Ai Kago (2000–2007)
- Coconuts Musume (1998–2008)
  - Chelsea Ching (1998–2000)
  - April Barbaran (1998–2000)
  - Danielle DeLaunay (1998–2001)
  - Lehua Sandbo (2000–2002)
  - Mika Todd (1998–2004)
  - Ayaka Kimura (1998–2008)
- Country Musume (1999–2000)
  - Hiromi Yanagihara (1999)
  - Azusa Kobayashi (1999–2002)
  - Rinne Toda (1999–2002)
  - Asami Kimura (2000–2007)
  - Miuna Saito (2003–2007)
- Rika Ishii (2001–2002)
- SINA (2008–2011)
  - Manami Iwashima (2005–2011)
  - Asami Abe (2005–2011)
  - Ai Suma (2005–2011)
  - Nana Nakayama (2005–2009)
- Shim Min (2003–2006)
- V-u-den (2004–2008)
  - Yui Okada (2004–2010)

- Hello! Project Kids (2002–2005)
- Berryz Kobo (2004–2014)
  - Maiha Ishimura (2002–2005)
  - Momoko Tsugunaga (2002–2017)
- Cute (2005–2017)
  - Megumi Murakami (2002–2006)
  - Kanna Arihara (2004–2009)
  - Erika Umeda (2002–2009)
  - Mai Hagiwara (2002–2017)
- Miki Korenaga (2004–2010)
- Angerme
  - Saki Ogawa (2009–2011)
  - Yuuka Maeda (2009–2011)
  - Fuyuka Kosuga (2011)
  - Kanon Fukuda (2009–2019)
  - Meimi Tamura (2011–2016)
  - Maho Aikawa (2014–2017)
  - Ayaka Wada (2009–2019)
  - Rina Katsuta (2011–2019)
  - Kana Nakanishi (2011–2019)
  - Mizuki Murota (2014–2020)
  - Musubu Funaki (2017–2020)
  - Momona Kasahara (2016–2021)
  - Haruka Oota (2018–2022)
  - Akari Takeuchi (2011–2023)
  - Rikako Sasaki (2014–2024)
  - Ayano Kawamura (2017–2024)
  - Moe Kamikokuryo (2015–2025)
- Juice=Juice
  - Aina Otsuka (2013)
  - Nanami Yanagawa (2017–2019)
  - Yuka Miyazaki (2013–2019)
  - Karin Miyamoto (2013–2020)
  - Sayuki Takagi (2013–2021)
  - Tomoko Kanazawa (2013–2021)
  - Manaka Inaba (2018–2022)
  - Akari Uemura (2013–2024)
- Country Girls (2014–2019)
  - Uta Shimamura (2014–2015)
  - Manaka Inaba (2014–2016)
  - Nanami Yanagawa (2015–2019)
  - Risa Yamaki (2014–2019)
  - Mai Ozeki (2014–2019)
  - Musubu Funaki (2015–2019)
  - Chisaki Morito (2014–2019)
- Magnolia Factory (2015–2020)
  - Rio Fujii (2015–2017)
  - Rena Ogawa (2015–2017)
  - Natsumi Taguchi (2015–2017)
  - Ayaka Hirose (2015–2020)
  - Minami Nomura (2015–2020)
  - Ayano Hamaura (2015–2020)
  - Sakurako Wada (2015–2020)
- Camellia Factory
  - Risa Ogata (2015–2020)
  - Kiki Asakura (2015–2023)
  - Riko Yamagishi (2015–2023)
  - Yumeno Kishimoto (2015–2023)
  - Kisora Niinuma (2015–2024)
  - Shiori Yagi (2021–2025)
- Beyooooonds
  - Reina Ichioka (2018–2024)
  - Yuhane Yamazaki (2018–2024)
  - Rika Shimakura (2018–2025)
- Ocha Norma
  - Sumire Tashiro (2021–2025)
  - Kanami Ishiguri (2021–2025)

Sub-units

- Petitmoni (1999–2013)
- Tanpopo (1999–2011)
- Minimoni (2000–2004)
- Morning Musume Sakuragumi (2003–2004)
- Morning Musume Otomegumi (2003–2004)
- Morning Musume Tanjō 10nen Kinentai (2007)
- Buono! (2007–2017)

Project groups

- Gomattou (2002)
- Romans (2003)
- Tomoiki Ki wo Uetai (2005–2013)
  - Rie Kaneko (2009–2013)
  - Asuna Okai (2009–2010)
  - Mia Sainen (2009–2010)
  - Kaori Sano (2009–2010)
- Ongaku Gatas (2007–2010)
  - Arisa Noto (2004–2009)
  - Yuri Sawada (2004–2009)
- Nochiura Natsumi (2004–2005)
- Ecomoni (2004–2007)
- Aa! (2003–2009)
- ZYX (2003–2009)
- Def.Diva (2005–2007)
- GAM (2006–2009)
- Athena & Robikerottsu (2007–2008)
- Kira Pika (2007)
- MilkyWay (2008–2009)
  - Sayaka Kitahara (2004–2011)
- High-King (2008–2015)
- Shugo Chara Egg! (2008–2010)
  - Irori Maeda (2008–2010)
- Guardians 4 (2009–2010)
- Lilpri (2010–2011)

Shuffle units

- Kiiro 5 (2000)
- Aoiro 7 (2000)
- Akagumi 4 (2000)
- 3-nin Matsuri (2001)
- 7-nin Matsuri (2001)
- 10-nin Matsuri (2001)
- Happy 7 (2002)
- Sexy 8 (2002)
- Odoru 11 (2002)
- Salt5 (2003)
- 7Air (2003)
- 11Water (2003)
- H.P. All Stars (2004)
- Elegies (2005)
- Sexy Otonajan (2005)
- Puripuri Pink (2005)
- Hello! Project Mobekimasu (2011–2013)

=== Affiliated with Up-Front Works ===
- Hitomi Yoshizawa (2000-2009)
- Rika Ishikawa (2000-2009)
- Asami Konno (2001-2011)
- Makoto Ogawa (2001-2009)
- Saki Shimizu (2002-2017)
- Maasa Sudou (2002-2015)
- Yurina Kumai (2002-2015)
- Koharu Kusumi (2005-2016)

- Up Up Girls Kakko Kari
  - Minami Sengoku (2004-2017)
- Aika Mitsui (2006-2018)
- Ships (2008-2009)
- Alma Kaminiito (2012-2013)
  - Munehiko Ohno (2012-2013)
- Team Makenki (2014-2018)
- Ciao Bella Cinquetti (2008-2018)

=== Affiliated with TNX ===
The company was created by Tsunku in 2006. Later the artists under TNX were collectively known as Nice Girl Project! and were noted for assisting in Nintendo's Rhythm Heaven series.

- Nice Girl Myu
- GTT Club
- MM Gakuen Gasshoubu
- Gyaruru
  - Ami Tokito
- Nice Girl Project! Kenshusei
- Canary Club
- Tokky
