= Magnolia Factory =

Japanese idol group

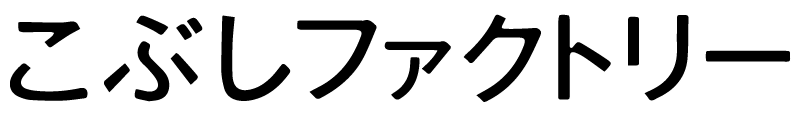
- Logo

Background information
- Origin: Tokyo, Japan
- Genres: J-pop
- Years active: 2015–2020
- Label: Up-Front Works
- Past members: Ayaka Hirose; Minami Nomura; Ayano Hamaura; Sakurako Wada; Rei Inoue; Rio Fujii; Rena Ogawa; Natsumi Taguchi
- Website: helloproject.com/kobushifactory/

Magnolia Factory (こぶしファクトリー, Kobushi Fakutori) was a Japanese girl idol group, formed by Up Front Group under the umbrella of Hello! Project in January 2015. The group was initially composed of eight girls who were members of Hello Pro Kenshusei. Their sister group was Camellia Factory. They disbanded on March 30, 2020.

== History ==
=== 2015-2016: Formation and debut ===
On January 2, 2015, during the Hello! Project 2015 Winter concert series, it was announced that a new unit consisting of Rio Fujii, Ayaka Hirose, Minami Nomura, Rena Ogawa, Ayano Hamaura, Natsumi Taguchi, Sakurako Wada, and Rei Inoue, was formed. On February 25, Up Front Group announced that the name of the new unit would be Magnolia Factory. On March 8, it was announced that the leader and the sub-leader of the unit were determined as Ayaka Hirose and Rio Fujii respectively.

On September 2, the group released their debut single, "Dosukoi! Kenkyo ni Daitan / Rāmen Daisuki Koizumi-san no Uta / Nen ni wa Nen (Nen'iri Ver.)".

On November 20, it was announced that they had won a Newcomer Award at the 57th Japan Record Awards At the ceremony on December 30, they were presented with their award and were later announced as the winners of the Best Newcomer Award.

On February 17, 2016, the group released their second single, "Sakura Night Fever / Chotto Guchoku ni! Chototsumōshin / Osu! Kobushi Tamashī"

Their third single, "Samba! Kobushi Janeiro / Bacchikoi Seishun! / Ora wa Ninkimono", was released on July 27, 2016.

On November 30, they released their first studio album, Kobushi Sono Ichi.

=== 2017-2018: Line-up changes ===
On May 12, 2017, Rio Fujii announced she would graduate from the group at the end of the Hello! Project 2017 Summer concert tour to focus on becoming a nurse or a teacher.

On June 14, the group released their fourth single, "Shalala! Yareru Hazu sa / Ee ja nai ka Ninja nai ka".

Rio Fujii's contract was terminated on July 6 due to her lack of compliance with the rules.

On July 13, Hello! Project announced that Rena Ogawa would take a hiatus from the group's activities due to anxiety neurosis. On September 6, it was announced that Ogawa had graduated from Magnolia Factory and Hello! Project after her condition failed to improve.

On December 6, Hello! Project announced that Natsumi Taguchi would no longer be part of the group for not complying with the rules and as a result, her contract was terminated.

On March 28, 2018, the group released their fifth single, "Kore Kara da! / Ashita Tenki ni Naare".

On August 8, they released their sixth single "Kitto Watashi wa / Naseba Naru".

=== 2019-2020: Disbandment ===
On April 24, 2019, the group released their seventh single, "Oh No Ōnō / Haru Urara".

They released their second studio album, Kobushi Dai Ni Maku, on October 2.

On March 4, 2020, the group released their eighth and final single, "Seishun no Hana / Start Line".

The group disbanded on March 30 with a concert at Tokyo Dome City Hall.

== Members prior to disbandment ==
- Ayaka Hirose (広瀬 彩海) - Leader
- Minami Nomura (野村 みな美)
- Ayano Hamaura (浜浦 彩乃)
- Sakurako Wada (和田 桜子)
- Rei Inoue (井上 玲音)

== Former members ==
- Rio Fujii (藤井 梨央) - Sub-leader
- Rena Ogawa (小川 麗奈)
- Natsumi Taguchi (田口 夏実)

== Discography ==
=== Albums ===
| # | Title | Peak rank | Release date |
|---|---|---|---|
| 1 | Kobushi Sono Ichi (辛夷其ノ壱) | 11 | November 30, 2016 |
| 2 | Kobushi Dai Ni Maku (辛夷第二幕) | 7 | October 2, 2019 |

=== Singles ===
| # | Title | Peak rank | Release date |
|---|---|---|---|
| 1 | Dosukoi! Kenkyo ni Daitan / Ramen Daisuki Koizumi-san no Uta / Nen ni wa Nen (Nen'iri Ver.) (ドスコイ！ケンキョにダイタン／ラーメン大好き小泉さんの唄／念には念(念入りVer.)) | 3 | September 2, 2015 |
| 2 | Sakura Night Fever / Chotto Guchoku ni! Chototsu Moushin / Osu! Kobushi Tamashii (桜ナイトフィーバー／チョット愚直に！猪突猛進／押忍！こぶし魂) | 1 | February 17, 2016 |
| 3 | Samba! Kobushi Janeiro / Bacchikoi Seishun! / Ora wa Ninkimono (サンバ！こぶしジャネイロ／バッチ来い青春！／オラはにんきもの) | 3 | July 27, 2016 |
| 4 | Shalala! Yareru Hazu sa / Ee ja nai ka Ninja nai ka (シャララ！やれるはずさ／エエジャナイカ ニンジャナイカ) | 4 | June 14, 2017 |
| 5 | Kore Kara da! / Ashita Tenki ni Naare (これからだ!／明日テンキになあれ) | 3 | March 28, 2018 |
| 6 | Kitto Watashi wa / Naseba Naru (きっと私は/ナセバナル) | 5 | August 8, 2018 |
| 7 | Oh No Ounou / Haru Urara (Oh No 懊悩／ハルウララ) | 4 | April 24, 2019 |
| 8 | Seishun no Hana / Start Line (青春の花/スタートライン) | 5 | March 4, 2020 |

=== DVD singles ===
| # | Title | Peak rank | Release date |
|---|---|---|---|
| 1 | Nen ni wa nen / Survivor (念には念／サバイバー) | N/A | March 26, 2015 |

== Awards ==
=== Japan Record Awards ===
The Japan Record Awards is a major music awards show held annually in Japan by the Japan Composer's Association.

| Year | Nominee / work | Award | Result |
|---|---|---|---|
| 2015 | Magnolia Factory | New Artist Award | Won |
| 2015 | Magnolia Factory | Best New Artist Award | Won |

| Preceded by Mariya Nishiuchi | Japan Record Award for Best New Artist; 2015 | Succeeded by iKon |
