= Akari Uemura =

Japanese pop singer (born 1998)

Akari Uemura 植村 あかり
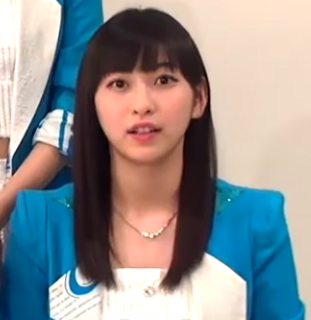

Background information
- Also known as: Ārī; Uemu (うえむー)
- Born: 30 December 1998 (age 27); Osaka Prefecture, Japan
- Genre: J-pop
- Occupations: Singer, actress
- Years active: 2012–present
- Labels: Up-Front Works; Hachama
- Formerly of: Juice=Juice; Hello Pro Kenshusei

Akari Uemura (植村 あかり, Uemura Akari; born 30 December 1998, in Osaka Prefecture, Japan) is a Japanese pop singer and idol pop singer signed to Hello! Project as a member of Japanese pop idol group Juice=Juice and Hello! Pro Kenshuusei. She was first introduced at the 2012 March Nama Tamago Show! concert. Her official nickname is Ārī (あーりー).

Uemura is represented by Up-Front Promotion.

== Biography ==
Uemura was recommended to Hello! Project by her aunt and was rejected in the third-order examinations of the 9th Morning Musume Audition. She later had a chance in her audition by taking dance lessons as a trainee in Osaka. Uemura was introduced at the Hello Puro Kenshuusei Happyoukai 2012: 3-tsuki no Nama Tamago Show! on 31 March 2012. In February 2013, she was chosen as a member of Juice=Juice. In June 2024, she graduated from both Juice=Juice and Hello! Project.

== Discography ==
for Akari Uemura's releases with Juice=Juice, see Juice=Juice#Discography.

Title	Album details	Peak chart positions			
Title	Album details	JPN			
Title	Album details	Album	Single	DVD	Blu-ray
Akari Uemura: Akari (植村あかり あかり)	Released: 16 December 2015; Label: Hachama; Formats: Blu-ray	—	—	—	55
Akari Uemura Take It Early (植村あかり Take It Early)	Released: 17 August 2016; Label: Hachama; Formats: Blu-ray	—	—	—	22

== Filmography ==
=== Stage ===
Year	Title	Ref.
2013	Moshimo Kokumin ga Shushō o Erandara	

=== Radio ===
Year	Title	Network	Ref.
2015	Juice=Juice Tomoko Kanazawa to Akari Uemura no Christmas mo My Pace	Radio Kansai	
