= Yuka Miyazaki =

Yuka Miyazaki 宮崎 由加
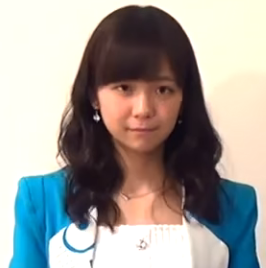
- Yuka Miyazaki

Background information
- Also known as: Yukanya; Yukanyan (ゆかにゃん)
- Born: April 2, 1994 (age 32); Ishikawa Prefecture, Japan
- Genres: J-pop
- Occupation: Singer
- Years active: 2012–
- Spouse: Unknown (m. 2023)

Yuka Miyazaki (宮崎 由加, Miyazaki Yuka; born 2 April 1994, in Ishikawa Prefecture, Japan) is a Japanese television personality and former pop singer. She was formerly the leader of the Hello! Project group Juice=Juice. Her fruit in the group was peach.

Miyazaki is represented by Up-Front Promotion.

== Career ==
- From June to August 2011, Miyazaki auditioned for both the S/mileage Member Boshū and the Morning Musume Genki Jirushi, but both auditions were rejected.
- Miyazaki won the "Encouragement/Samantha Thavasa Award" in the 2nd Forest Award New Face Audition in March 2012. During the audition, she played a piano cover of Ai Otsuka's "Planetarium". After winning the award, Miyazaki received piano lessons in Tokyo every two weeks, and found out that she would debut in May.
- In October 2012, Miyazaki participated in the planning of the television series Hello! Satoyama Life. Miyazaki debuted as a member of the "Satoyama movement" group Green Fields. The group had performed at Morning Musume's concert on the 28th of the same month. This was Miyazaki's first stage performance.
- It was announced that Miyazaki and five Hello Pro Kenshusei members formed a new group on 3 February 2013. (Note: Miyazaki is not a Hello Pro Kenshusei member.) On 25 February, the group's name was revealed to be Juice=Juice. Miyazaki is the oldest member of the group.
- On 13 June 2013 Miyazaki became the leader of Juice=Juice.
- On December 21, Miyazaki announced that she would graduate from Juice=Juice and Hello! Project at the end of Juice=Juice's 2019 spring tour.

== Personal life ==
On 4 August 2023, Miyazaki announced through a handwritten letter on her official twitter account that she has registered her marriage to her non-celebrity husband.

== Works ==
=== Singles ===
Green Fields

| Year | Title |
|---|---|
| 2012 | "Boys be ambitious!" |
| 2013 | "Tokainaka no Kare (cw/ Haru wa Kuru)" |

=== Videos ===
| Year | Title | Ref. |
|---|---|---|
| 2014 | Greeting: Yuka Miyazaki | |

== Filmography ==
=== TV series ===
| Year | Title | Network | Notes |
|---|---|---|---|
| 2012 | Hello! Satoyama Life | TV Tokyo | Appeared before being a member of Juice=Juice |

=== Radio ===
| Year | Title | Network |
|---|---|---|
| 2014 | Hello! Satoyama & Satoumi Club | Radio Japan |

== Publications ==
=== Photobooks ===
| Year | Title | Ref. |
|---|---|---|
| 2016 | Greeting -Photobook- | |
