= Tomoko Kanazawa =

Japanese pop singer signed to Hello! (born 1995)

Tomoko Kanazawa 金澤 朋子
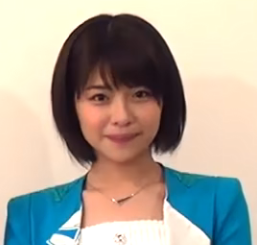

Background information
- Also known as: Kanatomo
- Born: 2 July 1995 (age 31); Saitama Prefecture, Japan
- Genres: J-pop
- Occupations: Idol; singer
- Years active: 2012–current

Tomoko Kanazawa (金澤 朋子, Kanazawa Tomoko; born 2 July 1995, in Saitama Prefecture) is a Japanese pop singer signed to Up-Front Promotion. She is a former member of Hello! Project and leader of Japanese idol group Juice=Juice and a member of Hello! Pro Kenshuusei. Her official nickname in Juice=Juice was Kanatomo (かなとも). Her fruit in the group was apple.

Kanazawa is represented by Up-Front Promotion.

== Biography ==
Kanazawa was submitted to the "Sign-iri Poster" excellence award and won during the Berryz Kobo × Cute Chō Happy Song "Dam Tomo Karaoke Contest". The performance made her noticed that it impressed her to sing.

Wishing to becoming a singer from experience, Kanazawa became an applicant for Up-Front Works' Ocean Music Award Shinjin Hakkutsu Ausition 2012 ni Dam Tomo. During the audition she failed and later announced on 20 November that she joined the Hello Pro Kenshusei. On 9 December Kanazawa was introduced at the Hello Pro Kenshusei Happyōkai 2012: 12-tsuki no Nama Tamago Show!

She was later chosen as a member of the new group Juice=Juice. During the group's third indie single "Ten Made Nobore!" on 13 June, Kanazawa announced that she was appointed as the sub-leader of the group.

On 25 January 2016 she announced that she had endometriosis. Kanazawa's agency said that "she will be watching activities during her condition" and an "expected change".

On 5 August 2016, she accompanied the first child birth of Hitomi Yoshizawa, Hello! Project's senior, and suspended activities as a public relations ambassador in Miyoshi, Saitama in which she came from the prefecture, and Kanazawa cooperated with the business of Miyoshi and from the previous year she took office as Assistant for Public Relations Ambassador for Miyoshi as a substitute. Her term in office is from 5 August 2016 to 31 March 2017.

On November 24, 2021, Kanazawa graduated from Juice=Juice and Hello! Project due to her still unstable condition caused by her endometriosis. She, however, stayed signed to Up-Front Promotion as a soloist.

== Publications ==
=== Videos ===
Year	Title	Publisher	Notes	Ref.
2014	Greeting –Tomoko Kanazawa–	Up-Front Works	e-Hello! Series (e-Line Up! Limited Time Sales)	

== Filmography ==
=== Radio ===
Year	Title	Network	Notes	Ref.
2015	Radio Nippon Next Bakunai	Radio Nippon	Assistant	
2015	Juice=Juice Tomoko Kanazawa to Akari Uemura no Christmas mo My Pace!	Radio Kansai		

=== Concerts ===
Year	Title	Location	Ref.
2013	Hello Pro Kenshusei Happyōkai 2013 –3-tsuki no Nama Tamago Show!–	Yokohama Blitz	
2013	Hello Pro Kenshusei Happyōkai 2013 –6-tsuki no Nama Tamago Show!–	Mielparque Tokyo, Osaka Mido Kaikan	
