= Karin Miyamoto =

Japanese pop singer (born 1998)

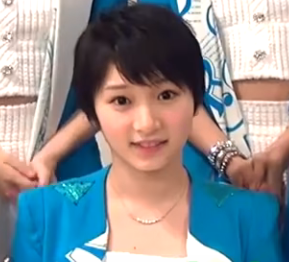
- Karin Miyamoto (2015)
- Born: December 1, 1998 (age 27)
- Occupation: Singer
- Musical career
- Genres: J-pop
- Instrument: vocals
- Years active: 2009–present
- Labels: Up-Front Works; hachama

Karin Miyamoto (宮本佳林, Miyamoto Karin; born December 1, 1998 in Chiba Prefecture, Japan) is a Japanese singer. She is a former member of Juice=Juice, an all-female pop group within Hello! Project. In 2025, she is set to her theatrical debut as Kaori Miyazono in the musical Your Lie in April.

== Hello! Project groups and units ==
- Hello Pro Egg / Hello Pro Kenshusei
- Shin Minimoni (2009)
- Reborn Eleven (2011)
- Juice=Juice (2013–2020)
- Jurin (2013–2016)

== Discography ==
for Karin Miyamoto's releases with Juice=Juice, see Juice=Juice#Discography.

=== Studio albums ===
| Title | Album details | Peak chart positions | | Sales |
| Title | Album details | JPN Oricon | JPN Hot (Note: Sources for chart positions are as follows: Hitori Toiro, Spancall."Japan Billboard Hot Albums 2024/05/29". Billboard (in Japanese). May 29, 2024.) | Sales |
|---|---|---|---|---|
| Hitori Toiro (ヒトリトイロ) | Released: October 12, 2022; Label: Hachama; Formats: CD, CD+Blu-ray | 10 | 8 | JPN: 6,840 |
| Spancall | Released: May 22, 2024; Label: Hachama; Formats: CD | 7 | 6 | JPN: 7,976 |

=== Solo DVDs ===
| Title | Album details | Peak chart positions | |
| Title | Album details | JPN DVD | JPN Blu-ray |
|---|---|---|---|
| Greeting ~Miyamoto Karin~ (Greeting ~宮本佳林~) | Released: March 3, 2014; Label: Hachama; Formats: DVD | — | — |
| Karin Miyamoto: KArin (宮本佳林 KArin) | Released: July 16, 2014; Label: Hachama; Formats: DVD | 58 | — |
| Karin Miyamoto is 16 years old (宮本佳林 かりんは16歳) | Released: July 22, 2015; Label: Hachama; Formats: Blu-ray | — | 76 |
| Bluest | Released: November 23, 2016; Label: Hachama; Formats: Blu-ray | — | 65 |
| Karin Miyamoto: Karin=Karin | Released: December 26, 2018; Label: Hachama; Formats: Blu-ray | — | 70 |
| Miyamoto Karin Graduation Memorial (宮本佳林卒業メモリアル) | Released: November 17, 2020; Label: Hachama; Formats: DVD | — | — |

=== Live concerts ===
| Title | Album details |
|---|---|
| Miyamoto Karin Live Tour - karing - (宮本佳林 LIVE TOUR ～karing～) | Released: March 25, 2020; Label: Hachama; Formats: DVD, Blu-ray |
| M-line Special 2021～Make a Wish!～ | Collaboration with Airi Suzuki & Pink Cres.; Released: August 18, 2021 (JPN); Label: Up-Front Works; Formats: DVD |
| M-line Special 2021～Make a Wish!～ on 20th June | Collaboration with Pink Cres., Reina Tanaka & Sayumi Michishige; Released: November 3, 2021 (JPN); Label: Up-Front Works; Formats: DVD |

=== Singles ===
| No. | Title | Year | Peak chart positions | | Sales | Album |
| No. | Title | Year | JPN Oricon | JPN Hot 100 | Sales | Album |
|---|---|---|---|---|---|---|
| Digital 1 | "Dōshite Bokura wa Yaruki ga Nai no ka" (どうして僕らにはやる気がないのか) | 2019 | — | — | | Non-album single |
| Digital 2 | "Mirai no Filament" (未来のフィラメント) | 2020 | — | — | | Hitori Toiro |
| 1 | "Dōshite Bokura ni wa Yaruki ga Nai no ka (2021)" (どうして僕らにはやる気がないのか (2021)) | 2021 | 7 | — | | Hitori Toiro |
| 1 | "Hyōtenka" (氷点下) | 2021 | 7 | — | | Hitori Toiro |
| 1 | "Kikakugai no Romance" (規格外のロマンス) | 2021 | 7 | — | | Hitori Toiro |
| 2 | "Nantetatte I Love You" (なんてったって I Love You) | 2022 | 7 | — (Note: Charted at number 84 on the Download Songs chart .) | | Hitori Toiro |
| 2 | "Howling" (ハウリング) | 2022 | 7 | — | | Hitori Toiro |
| Digital 3 | "Hotarumatsuri no Hi" (ほたる祭りの日) (with Masaki Sato) | 2022 | — | — (Note: Charted at number 49 on the Download Songs chart .) | | Non-album singles |
| 3 | "Bambina Bambino" / "Lonely Bus" (バンビーナ・バンビーノ/Lonely Bus) | 2023 | 3 | 54 | JPN: 25,146 | Non-album singles |
| 4 | "Kiken na Mahō" / "Beast!" (キケンな魔法/Beast!) | 2025 | — | 39 | | Non-album singles |
| 5 | "Hanakin" / "Shanikamā" (Hanakin/シャニカマー) | 2026 | 6 | 26 | JPN: 19,669 | Non-album singles |

== Bibliography ==
=== Photobooks ===
- Karin (佳林) (June 12, 2014, Crocodile Books, ISBN 978-4-8470-4653-7)
- Karin sixteen (May 27, 2015, Crocodile Books, ISBN 978-4-8470-4757-2)
- Sunflower (October 21, 2016, Crocodile Books, ISBN 978-4-8470-4870-8)
- 20th Anniversary (二十歳記念) (December 1, 2018, Crocodile Books, ISBN 978-4-8470-8165-1)
- RIN (May 20, 2020, Crocodile Books, ISBN 978-4-8470-8290-0)
