= Mega Melon =

Studio album by Melon Kinenbi
- Released: December 10, 2008
- Genre: J-pop
- Label: zetima
- Producer: Taisei

Melon Kinenbi chronology
Melon Juice (2007)	Mega Melon (2008)	Melon's Not Dead (2010)

Mega Melon is a greatest hits album by Japanese girl group Melon Kinenbi. It was released on December 10, 2008, little under a year after the release of their last album, Melon Juice. It reached a peak position of #122 on the Oricon weekly chart. As part of the tenth anniversary of Hello! Project's "Mega Best Series", it was released as a 2-disc CD + DVD package. It is the second "single best" compilation, including the more recent singles since the first, Fruity Killer Tune, was released in 2006.

== Track listings ==
=== CD ===
1. "Amai Anata no Aji" (甘いあなたの味, Your Sweet Taste)
2. "Kokuhaku Kinenbi" (告白記念日, Confession Day)
3. "Denwa Matteimasu" (電話待っています, Call Waiting)
4. "This Is Unmei" (This Is 運命, This Is Fate)
5. "Saa! Koibito ni Narō" (さぁ!恋人になろう)
6. "Natsu no Yoru wa Danger!" (夏の夜はデインジャー!, Dangerous Summer Night!)
7. "Kōsui" (香水, Perfume)
8. "Akai Freesia" (赤いフリージア, Red Freesia)
9. "Chance of Love" (チャンス of LOVE)
10. "Mi Da Ra Matenrō" (MI DA RA 摩天楼, Mi Da Ra Skyscraper)
11. "Kawaii Kare" (かわいい彼, He's Cute)
12. "Namida no Taiyō" (涙の太陽, Tears of the Sun)
13. "Champagne no Koi" (シャンパンの恋, Champagne Love)
14. "Nikutai wa Shōjiki na Eros" (肉体は正直なEROS, The Body of a True Eros)
15. "Unforgettable" (アンフォゲッタブル)
16. "Onegai Miwaku no Target" ~Mango Purine Mix~ (お願い魅惑のターゲット ～マンゴープリン Mix～, Please, Captivating Target ~Mango Purine Mix~)
17. "Charisma - Kirei" (カリスマ・綺麗, Charisma - Beauty)
18. "Give Me Up"

=== DVD ===
1. "Amai Anata no Aji" (甘いあなたの味, Your Sweet Taste)
2. "Kokuhaku Kinenbi" (告白記念日, Confession Day)
3. "Denwa Matteimasu" (電話待っています, Call Waiting)
4. "This Is Unmei" (This Is 運命, This Is Fate)
5. "Saa! Koibito ni Narō" (さぁ!恋人になろう)
6. "Natsu no Yoru wa Danger!" (夏の夜はデインジャー!, Dangerous Summer Night!)
7. "Kōsui" (香水, Perfume)
8. "Akai Freesia" (赤いフリージア, Red Freesia)
9. "Chance of Love" (チャンス of LOVE)
10. "Mi Da Ra Matenrō" (MI DA RA 摩天楼, Mi Da Ra Skyscraper)
11. "Kawaii Kare" (かわいい彼, He's Cute)
12. "Namida no Taiyō" (涙の太陽, Tears of the Sun)
13. "Champagne no Koi" (シャンパンの恋, Champagne Love)
14. "Nikutai wa Shōjiki na Eros" (肉体は正直なEROS, The Body of a True Eros)
15. "Unforgettable" (アンフォゲッタブル)
16. "Onegai Miwaku no Target (Live Ver.)" (お願い魅惑のターゲット (Live Ver.), Please, Captivating Target (Live Ver.))
17. "Charisma - Kirei" (カリスマ・綺麗, Charisma - Beauty)
18. "Onegai Miwaku no Target (Yonjigen Jakku!! Live Ver.)" (お願い魅惑のターゲット (四次元ジャック!! Live Ver.), Please, Captivating Target (4-dimensional Jack!! Live Ver.))
19. "Give Me Up (Yonjigen Jakku!! Live Ver.)" (Give Me Up (四次元ジャック!! Live Ver.), Give Me Up (4-dimensional Jack! Live Ver.))
