= 1st Goodsal =

- Normal edition cover.

Studio album by Ongaku Gatas
- Released: February 6, 2008
- Recorded: 2007–2008
- Genre: Japanese pop
- Length: 43:38
- Language: Japanese
- Labels: Zetima; EPCE-5534 (CD+Photobook); EPCE-5535 (regular edition)
- Producer: Tsunku

1st Goodsal is the first, and to date only, studio album by Japanese idol group Ongaku Gatas. It was released by Zetima Records on February 6, 2008. The album peaked at #24 on the Oricon weekly charts, charting for two weeks.

== Track listing ==
All lyrics are written by Tsunku except track 7, written by Makoto of Sharam Q, and track 8, written by Yoshiko Miura.

No.	Title	Music	Length
1.	"Dakishimete... Namida" (抱きしめて・・・涙, "Hold Me... Tears")	Hiroshi Matsui	4:29
2.	"Osaki ni Sunzurei" (お先にすんずれい)	Jun Yamazaki	3:31
3.	"Narihajimeta Koi no Bell"	Hiroshi Matsui	4:33
4.	"Seishun no Custard" (青春のカスタード, "Custard of Youth") (Performed by Hitomi Yoshizawa and Mai Satoda.)	Shunsuke Suzuki	4:31
5.	"Kokoro no Tanima" (心の谷間, "Chasm of the Heart") (Performed by Arisa Noto and Erina Mano.)	Shōichirō Hirata	4:20
6.	"Yattarōze!" (やったろうぜ!, "Let's Do It!")	Dance Man	3:56
7.	"Chikyū to Tsuki; Kare to Watashi" (地球と月 彼と私, "The Earth and The Moon; Him and Me") (Performed by Rika Ishikawa, Asami Konno, Minami Sengoku and Yuri Sawada.)	Kōichi Yuasa	4:52
8.	"Kara Genki" (カラゲンキ) (Performed by Hitomi Yoshizawa, Rika Ishikawa, Asami Konno, and Mai Satoda.)	Yuichi Takahashi	5:00
9.	"Koi Uranai Dōri ni wa Naranai wa" (恋占い通りにはならないわ, "Love Won't Go As Foretold") (Performed by Miki Korenaga, Arisa Noto, Erina Mano, Minami Sengoku, Yuri Sawada and Mika Mutō.)	Yuichi Takahashi	4:36
10.	"Kiss Shiyō" (キスしよう, "Kiss Me") (Performed by Rika Ishikawa and Asami Konno.)	Nao Tanaka	4:19
Total length:			43:48
