= Fruity Killer Tune =

Studio album by Melon Kinenbi
- Released: December 6, 2006
- Genre: J-pop
- Label: Zetima
- Producer: Tsunku

Melon Kinenbi chronology
THE Nimaime (2004)	Fruity Killer Tune (2006)	Melon Juice (2006)

Fruity Killer Tune is the third album from the J-pop group Melon Kinenbi. It contains only two of their more recent singles as well as one completely new track and a remix. In addition, fans were invited to vote on thirteen more songs that would appear on the album, making it an effective "Best of", containing many re-released singles and B-sides not previously released on an album. Fruity Killer Tune was released on December 6, 2006, more than two years after the group's second album.

== Track listing ==
1. Akai Freesia (赤いフリージア, Red Freesia)
  - 1st place in vote
2. Saa, Sassoku Moriagete Iko ka~!! (さあ、早速盛り上げて 行こか～！！, Now, Right Now, Let's Go~!!)
  - 7th place in vote
3. Onegai Miwaku no Target (お願い魅惑のターゲット, Please, Captivating Target)
  - 6th place in vote
4. This is Unmei (This is 運命, This is Fate)
  - 2nd place in vote
5. Girls Power, Aisuru Power (ガールズパワー・愛するパワー, Girls' Power, Love's Power)
  - 8th place in vote
6. Denwa Matteimasu (電話待っています, Call Waiting)
  - 11th place in vote
7. Mi Da Ra Matenrō (Mi Da Ra 摩天楼, Mi Da Ra Skyscraper)
  - 12th place in vote
8. Kawaii Kare (かわいい彼, He's Cute)
  - 5th place in vote
9. Saa! Koibito ni Narō (さぁ!恋人になろう)
  - 3rd place in vote
10. Skip! (スキップ！)
  - 13th place in vote
11. Enryo wa Nashi yo! (遠慮はなしよ！, Don't Refrain!)
  - 9th place in vote
12. Nikutai wa Shōjiki na Eros (肉体は正直なEros, The Body of a True Eros)
  - 10th place in vote
13. Kōsui (香水, Perfume) (Hard Flavor Remix)
  - 4th place in vote (from original version)
  - Remixed to fit the album's theme
14. Leather
  - New song

== Charts ==
- "Nikutai wa Shōjiki na Eros" (肉体は正直なEROS, The Body of a True Eros) reached its highest position on the Oricon weekly chart at number 21. This was the last of Melon Kinenbi's singles to be produced by Tsunku, before fellow Sharam Q member Taisei took over.
- "Saa! Koibito ni Narō" (さぁ!恋人になろう) peaked on the Oricon weekly chart at number 20, and it served as the ending theme for Aidoru wo Sagase!.
- "Kawaii Kare" (かわいい彼, He's Cute) peaked on the Oricon weekly chart at number 14.
