= Narihajimeta Koi no Bell =

Single by Ongaku Gatas

from the album 1st Goodsal
- B-side: "Dreamin' (Gatas Brilhantes H.P.'s Fight Song)"
- Released: September 12, 2007
- Recorded: 2007
- Genre: J-pop
- Length: 13:22
- Label: Zetima
- Songwriter(s): Tsunku

Ongaku Gatas singles chronology
"–"	"Narihajimeta Koi no Bell" (2007)	"Yattarōze!" (2007)

"Narihajimeta Koi no Bell" (鳴り始めた恋のＢＥＬＬ, The First Chime of Love's Bell) is the debut single of Japanese girl group Ongaku Gatas, formed from members of Hello! Project's futsal team Gatas Brilhantes H.P. and Hello Pro Eggs, which was released on September 12, 2007, under the Zetima label (distributed by Sony Music Entertainment Japan).

== History ==
The single was released both as a normal edition CD (catalogue number EPCE-5494), and a limited edition CD + DVD set (catalogue numbers EPCE-5492-3) with an alternative cover. The Single V (EPBE-5262) was released on the same day, featuring two versions of the music video and "making of" footage. The song was used in a tie-up with Cirque du Soleil as the "Dralion Daihatsu" image song for its Japanese tour. The group were later referred to as one of many "supporters" of Dralion. Its highest position on the Oricon weekly chart was #10, remaining on the chart for three weeks.

The single was originally scheduled for release on August 22, but was moved to September 12 due to production issues. However, some stores still released the normal version of the single by mistake on August 22, especially over the internet. The error was not corrected until many copies had already been sold. In the original release, there are typographical errors in the names and home-towns of the group's members. In the later releases, however, these have been corrected.

== Track listings ==
All tracks are written by Tsunku

CD
No.	Title	Arranger	Length
1.	"Narihajimeta Koi no Bell" (鳴り始めた恋のBELL, The First Chime of Love's Bell)	Hiroshi Matsui
2.	"Dreamin' (Gatas Brilhantes H.P. no Ōenka)" (DREAMIN'～ガッタスブリリャンティスH.P.の応援歌～, Dreamin' (Gatas Brilhantes H.P.'s Fight Song))	Jun Yamazaki
3.	"Narihajimeta Koi no Bell (Instrumental)"

Single V DVD
No.	Title	Length
1.	"Narihajimeta Koi no Bell"
2.	"Narihajimeta Koi no Bell (Close-up Ver.)"
3.	"Making Eizō" (メイキング映像, Making Of)

== Members at time of single ==
- Hitomi Yoshizawa (Leader)
- Rika Ishikawa (v-u-den)
- Mai Satoda (Country Musume)
- Asami Konno
- Miki Korenaga (Hello Pro Egg)
- Arisa Noto (Hello Pro Egg)
- Erina Mano (Hello Pro Egg)
- Minami Sengoku (Hello Pro Egg)
- Yuri Sawada (Hello Pro Egg)
- Mika Mutō (Hello Pro Egg)
