= Akari Saho =

Japanese musician

Akari Saho 佐保 明梨
- Also known as: Akari (アカリ)
- Born: June 8, 1995 (age 31)
- Origin: Tokyo Prefecture, Japan
- Genre: J-pop
- Occupation: Singer
- Years active: 2004–present
- Member of: Up-Up Girls
- Formerly of: Hello Pro Egg; Tomoiki Ki o Uetai; Shugo Chara! Egg!; Aa!
- Website: Hello! Project.com

Akari Saho (佐保 明梨, Saho Akari; born June 8, 1995) is a Japanese singer. She is a member of Up-Up Girls and a former member of Hello! Pro Egg, a Japanese idol trainee program under the Hello! Project umbrella. She was also an original member of Shugo Chara! Egg!, and played the role of Amulet Spade in the live action segment of the highly acclaimed television series Shugo Chara! Party!. She completed her training in Hello! Pro Egg on April 18, 2011, and joined Up-Front Girls on May 3, 2011. On May 16, 2011, she was also added to UFZS, a K-Pop dance cover group.

== History ==
Akari Saho was chosen as one of 32 winners from 10,570 applicants in the search for talent for a new trainee group under the Hello! Project umbrella called Hello! Pro Egg in June 2004.

Akari replaced the graduated member Ayumi Yutoku in Tomoiki Ki Wo Uetai (We Want To Plant Trees) in November 2007, although this group is rarely active.

In late 2008, along with Ayaka Wada, Yuuka Maeda and Kanon Fukuda, Akari became a member of Shugo Chara! Egg!, a group formed to sing the opening theme song of the second season of the anime series Shugo Chara! (Shugo Chara! Doki).

In July 2009 it was revealed that Akari was to replace Reina Tanaka in the revived Hello! Project group Aa! for a cover album project, Champloo 1: Happy Marriage Song Cover Shū. In addition, the group was also featured in another compilation album and numerous concert appearances.

In August, Shugo Chara! Egg! changed its lineup for season 3 of "Shugo Chara! Party!". Akari stayed while Ayaka, Yuuka and Kanon left to concentrate on their newly formed group S/mileage. Akari was soon joined by Irori Maeda and Mizuki Fukumura. They sang the theme for the anime portion, Shugo Chara! Dokki Doki, while appearing in the live action segments as characters from the anime. During these segments, they advertised auditions to cast a new member of Shugo Chara! Egg!. Eventually they were joined by Nanami Tanabe, the winner of the auditions.

Akari appeared as one of the backup dancers in three consecutive Erina Mano music videos, "Haru no Arashi", "Onegai Dakara..." and "Genkimono de Ikō!"

On April 18, 2011, the official Hello! Pro Egg website announced that Akari had finished her training.

On May 3, 2011, Akari officially joined Up-Front Girls, a new group under Up-Front Agency. Her joining was announced during a live performance streamed on Nico Nico Douga.

On May 16, 2011, Akari, along with fellow Up-Front Girls member, Minami Sengoku, was added to UFZS, a K-Pop dance cover group. Currently, all seven members of Up-Front Girls are also members of UFZS.

On June 26, 2011, Up-Front Girls was renamed to Up-Up Girls. The lineup remained unchanged.

On July 1, 2011, it was announced that Up-Up Girls would become regular performers at an idol theater called MAP Theater, located in Akihabara. They are scheduled to perform every Thursday.

In July, 2011, it was revealed that Akari, along with fellow Up-Up Girls member, Ayano Sato, would make an appearance in a TV drama entitled Yuusha Yoshihiko to Maou no Shiro (勇者ヨシヒコと魔王の城).

On August 12, 2011, Takamasa Sakurai Tweeted that Akari, along with former Morning Musume member, Linlin, would be forming a special unit. They will be performing a mini live at a Harajuku fashion show in Harbin, China.

On March 10, 2012, Up-Up Girls will release the first version of their debut single, Going My ↑ (pronounced "Going My Way") as an event-only release.

== Filmography ==
=== Movies ===
- 2010 – Hoshisuna no Shima no Chiisana Tenshi ~Mermaid Smile~ (星砂の島のちいさな天使～マーメイドスマイル～, "Little Angel Star Sand Island ~Mermaid Smile~")

=== TV series ===
- 2009 – 2010: Shugo Chara! Party!
