= Gatas Brilhantes H.P. =

Japanese futsal club

- Shirt badge/Association crest
- Nickname(s): Gatas
- Association: Hello! Project
- Head coach: Kensuke Takahashi
- Captain: Hitomi Yoshizawa; Ayumi Shibata
- Top scorer: Miki Korenaga
Home colours	Away colours

Gatas Brilhantes H.P. (ガッタス・ブリリャンチス H.P., Gattasu Buriryanchisu Etchi Pī; Portuguese word for Shining Cats H.P.) was a futsal team representing Hello! Project. The team was founded on September 9, 2003, and was later disbanded on March 7, 2015.

== History ==
On April 23, 2007, nine new members from Mix Gatas were added to the team mainly from Berryz Kobo and Cute with one member from Hello! Project Eggs.

On June 18, 2007, Asami Konno joined select members of the team to create the group Ongaku Gatas while also continuing to play for the futsal team.

== Team members ==
=== Supervisors and coaches ===
Position	Name	Miscellaneous information
Supervisor	Tsuyoshi Kitazawa	Former player of J. League team, Tokyo Verdy 1969, and ambassador of Japan Football Association
Coach	Kiyoshi Sagane	Affiliated with "Predator Urayasu Futsal Club"
Coach	Kenta Fujii	Affiliated with "Predator Urayasu Futsal Club"
Coach	Reinaldo	Former player of J. League team, Shonan Bellmare
Coach	Ryouko Saitou	Affiliated with "Parareds Futsal Setagaya"
Goal keeper coach	Toru Furushou	Affiliated with "Goodwill Cascavel"
Trainer	Emi Itami	Former player of a L. League team

=== Players ===
Current members
Uniform number	Name	Group
1	Nozomi Tsuji (Goalkeeper)	Up-Front Agency currently inactive
6	Miki Fujimoto	Up-Front Agency currently inactive
7	Miki Korenaga	Up-Front Agency
9	Rika Ishikawa	Up-Front Agency
10	Hitomi Yoshizawa (Captain)	Up-Front Agency
17	Maimi Yajima	°C-ute
18	Risa Ono	
20	Konatsu Furukawa	Up-Up Girls
21	Ayano Sato	Up-Up Girls
24	Akari Saho	Up-Up Girls
26	Chisato Okai	°C-ute
28	Minami Sengoku	Up-Up Girls
31	Saki Mori	Up-Up Girls
32	Saki Nagai	
33	Kanae Sugawara	
34	Megumi Yaguchi (Goalkeeper)	
Former members
Makoto Ogawa	Up-Front Agency	
Miuna Saito	Former Country Musume member	
Masae Ootani	Former Melon Kinenbi member	
Aya Matsuura	Up-Front Agency	
Asami Kimura	Former Country Musume member	
Hitomi Saito	Former Melon Kinenbi member	
Maki Goto	soloist under Avex Trax	
Miyuki Kawashima	Former Hello Pro Kenshuusei member	
Ayumi Shibata	Former Melon Kinenbi member	
Mai Satoda	Former Country Musume member	
Asami Konno (Goalkeeper)	TV Tokyo announcer	
Saki Shimizu	Berryz Kobo	
Erika Umeda (Goalkeeper)	Former °C-ute member	
Maasa Sudo (Goalkeeper)	Berryz Kobo	
Chinami Tokunaga	Berryz Kobo	
Miyabi Natsuyaki	Berryz Kobo	
Saki Nakajima	°C-ute	
Airi Suzuki	°C-ute	
Mika Mutou	Former Hello Pro Kenshuusei member	

== Timeline ==
- 2003-11-16 - Hello! Project Sports Festival 2003 in Osaka
- 2003-11-22 - Hello! Project Sports Festival 2003 in Tokyo
- 2004-04-27 - Tokyo Women's League Futsal Competition
- 2004-08-14 to 2004-08-15 - Odaiba Bouken O Cup (Cup Winner)
- 2004-10-18 - Women Futsal in Aichi (Expo Cup) (Cup Winner)
- 2004-11-14 - Hello! Project Sports Festival 2004 in Aichi (Epson Cup)
- 2004-11-23 - Saitama Challenge-Match (Cup Winner)
- 2004-12-05 - Hello! Project Sports Festival 2004 in Saitama (Epson Cup)
- 2005-03-14 - Fuji TV 739 Cup
- 2005-05-23 - Second Fuji TV 739 Cup (Cup Winner)
- 2005-07-26 - Skylark Group Cup(Cup Winner)
- 2005-07-30 - Osaka King Festival
- 2005-08-06 to 2005-08-30 - Skylark Group Odaiba Bouken League

== Statistics ==
=== Assists ===
Rank	Name	Year						
Rank	Name	2003	2004	2005	2006	2007	2008	Total
1	Hitomi Yoshizawa	1	3	10	5	1	1	21
2	Ayumi Shibata	–	–	3	3	1	7	14
3	Miki Korenaga	–	3	4	1	1	2	11
3	Miki Fujimoto	–	–	4	2	4	1	11
5	Rika Ishikawa	–	–	3	2	1	2	8
6	Mai Satoda	–	1	1	3	–	1	6
7	Mika Muto	–	–	–	–	–	1	1
7	Maasa Sudo	–	–	–	–	1	–	1
7	Nozomi Tsuji	–	–	–	1	–	–	1

== See also ==
- Ongaku Gatas
