= Megumi Murata =

Megumi Murata 村田 めぐみ
- Born: March 3, 1981 (age 45)
- Other names: ムラタメグミ, Murata Megumi
- Occupations: Singer; tarento
- Musical career
- Genres: J-pop
- Years active: 1999–2011
- Label: Zetima
- Website: www.up-front-agency.co.jp/artist/murata_megumi/

Megumi Murata (村田 めぐみ, Murata Megumi) (born March 3, 1981, in Sendai) is a former member and sub-leader of Melon Kinenbi, an all-girl J-pop group formerly within Hello! Project.

== Biography ==
Murata passed the second Morning Musume & Michiyo Heike Imōtobun Audition, out of about 4,000 total people to audition. The final four (Hitomi Saito, Murata, Masae Ōtani and Ayumi Shibata) were chosen to form a new Hello! Project group, called Melon Kinenbi. Murata was originally leader of the group at the time of its founding in 1999, until leadership was given to Hitomi Saito in September 2002. Murata participated in a number of shuffle units – 10-nin Matsuri, Odoru 11, 11Water and H.P. All Stars.

For several years her "trademark" within the group was wearing glasses; however, since 2006 she has rarely worn them, saying that the glasses had become "too comfortable" to her – while performing she wears contact lenses, but still wears glasses at home.

In May 2010, Melon Kinenbi officially disbanded. It was announced in June that Murata would remain contracted with Up-Front Agency, the company behind Hello! Project, and pursue a solo career. She also altered her stage name slightly as of July 1, writing it in all-katakana (ムラタメグミ) instead. Murata became the first (and to date only) member of Melon Kinenbi to be included on Hello! Project's official list of graduates, as the only member still with Up-Front. Despite this announcement, however, nothing was heard of regarding Murata's solo career, and the last update regarding her career was on May 5, 2011, through a blog entry.

== Appearances ==
=== Television ===
Show	Start date	End date
Majojjo Rika-chan no Magical Biyuden (魔女っ娘。梨華ちゃんのマジカル美勇伝)	2005-11-11 – 2005-11-15	2005-11-29 – 2005-11-30
Musume Dokyu! (娘DOKYU!)	August 18, 2005	2006-09-29
Ikkakusenkin Yamawake Q! "Sekininsha wa Omae da!" (一攫千金ヤマワケQ! "責任者はお前だ!")	March 25, 2008	Still running

=== Radio ===
Program	Start date	End date
TBC Fun Field Mōretsu Mōdasshu (TBC FUNふぃーるど・モーレツモーダッシュ)	2005-4-1	2008-3-29
Hello! Project Melon Kinenbi no "Muratajio" (ハロー!プロジェクト メロン記念日の"ムラタジオ", Hello! Project Melon Kinenbi's "Murata-dio")	2008-4-5	2008-6-28
"Satomi Doi no Yokohama Lohas" Radio Honjitsu (「土井里美のヨコハマろはす」ラジオ日本)	2010–??-?? – present, each Tuesday	—
