= Melon Juice (album) =

Melon Juice メロンジュース

Studio album by Melon Kinenbi
- Released: December 12, 2007
- Genre: J-pop
- Label: zetima
- Producer: Taisei

Melon Kinenbi chronology
Fruity Killer Tune (2006)	Melon Juice メロンジュース (2007)	Mega Melon (2008)

Melon Juice (メロンジュース) is a mini-album by Japanese girl group Melon Kinenbi. It was released on December 12, 2007, and peaked at #67 on the Oricon weekly chart.

== Track listing ==
1. Charisma - Kirei (カリスマ・綺麗, Charisma - Beauty)
  - This song was released as a single shortly after the album's release.
2. Lunch (ランチ)
  - Solo by Megumi Murata
3. Rokugatsu no Sunshine (6月のサンシャイン, June Sunshine)
  - Solo by Masae Ohtani
4. Drive (ドライブ)
  - Solo by Ayumi Shibata
5. Akuma de Fake (あくま de FAKE)
  - Solo by Hitomi Saito
6. Unforgettable (アンフォゲッタブル)
7. Onegai Miwaku no Target ~Mango Pudding Mix~ (お願い魅惑のターゲット ～マンゴープリン Mix～, Please, Captivating Target ~Mango Pudding Mix~)
