= Romans (group) =

Japanese pop group

- Romans, 2003

Background information
- Origin: Japan
- Genre: J-pop
- Years active: 2003
- Label: Zetima
- Past members: Rika Ishikawa; Ayaka Kimura; Hitomi Saito; Mai Satoda; Mari Yaguchi

Romans (ろまんす, Romansu; pronounced romance) was a Japanese girl group formed in 2003 and associated with Up-Front Promotion. The group consists of Mari Yaguchi, Rika Ishikawa, Mai Satoda, Hitomi Saito, and Ayaka Kimura, all of whom are part of Hello! Project. The group was created to promote the mini variety program, Sexy Onna Juku, which featured all the members. Their only single, "Sexy Night (Wasurerarenai Kare)", which was the show's theme song, was released on August 20, 2003, and ranked no. 10 on Oricon.

== Members ==
- Mari Yaguchi
- Rika Ishikawa
- Mai Satoda
- Hitomi Saito
- Ayaka Kimura

== Discography ==
=== Single ===
#	Title	Release date
1	"Sexy Night: Wasurerarenai Kare" (Sexy Night: 忘れられない彼)	2003-08-20
