= Melon Juice =

Melon juice or Melon Juice may refer to:

- Juice from a melon
- Melon Juice (album), by Melon Kinenbi
- "Melon Juice" (song), by HKT48
