= Seishun on the Road =

Single by Melon Kinenbi & The Collectors

from the album Melon's Not Dead
- Released: October 10, 2009
- Recorded: 2009
- Genre: J-pop, alternative
- Length: 6:49
- Label: Up-Front Works
- Songwriter(s): Hisashi Katō
- Producer(s): Taisei

Melon Kinenbi & The Collectors singles chronology
"–"	"Seishun on the Road"	"–"

Melon Kinenbi singles chronology
"sweet suicide summer story" (2009)	"Seishun on the Road" (2009)	"Melon Tea" (2009)

"Seishun On The Road" (青春・オン・ザ・ロード, Youth On The Road) is the fourth in the series of five indies collaboration singles by Japanese girl group Melon Kinenbi, in a collaboration with The Collectors. It was released as limited distribution on October 10, 2009. People that purchased the single from the Tower Records online store received a free original computer wallpaper.

== Track listing ==
1. "Seishun On The Road" (青春・オン・ザ・ロード, "Youth On The Road")
2. "Seishun On The Road" (Instrumental) (青春・オン・ザ・ロード (Instrumental))

== Personnel ==
- Lyrics & composition – Hisashi Katō
- Arrangement – The Collectors & Hitoshi Yoshida
