= Chance of Love =

Single by Melon Kinenbi

from the album The Nimaime
- Released: May 8, 2003
- Genre: J-pop; R&B; dance-pop
- Label: Zetima
- Songwriter(s): Tsunku
- Producer(s): Tsunku

Melon Kinenbi singles chronology
"Akai Freesia" (2003)	"Chance of Love" (2003)	"Mi Da Ra Matenrō" (2003)

"Chance of Love" (チャンス of LOVE) is the ninth single by Japanese girl group Melon Kinenbi. It was released on May 8, 2003, and its highest position on the Oricon weekly chart was #10.

== Track listing ==
1. Chance of Love (チャンス of LOVE)
2. Natsu (夏, Summer)
3. Chance of Love (Instrumental) (チャンス of LOVE（Instrumental）)
