= Onegai Miwaku no Target =

2006 single by Melon Kinenbi

"Onegai Miwaku no Target/Crazy Happy!"

Single by Melon Kinenbi

from the album Fruity Killer Tune
- Released: June 10, 2006
- Genre: J-pop, pop punk
- Label: Up-Front Works

Melon Kinenbi singles chronology
"Nikutai wa Shōjiki na Eros" (2005)	"Onegai Miwaku no Target/Crazy Happy!" (2006)	"Unforgettable" (2007)

"Onegai Miwaku no Target"

Single by Melon Kinenbi

from the album Melon Juice (album)
- Released: September 5, 2007
- Genre: J-pop
- Label: Zetima

Melon Kinenbi singles chronology
"Unforgettable" (2007)	"Onegai Miwaku no Target" (2007)	"Charisma - Kirei" (2008)

"Onegai Miwaku no Target/Crazy Happy!" (お願い魅惑のターゲット/Crazy Happy!, Please, Captivating Target/Crazy Happy!) / "Onegai Miwaku no Target" (お願い魅惑のターゲット, Please, Captivating Target) is a single by Japanese girl group Melon Kinenbi.

== Album versions ==
The single was released in two versions, the first of which was released as an indies single in 2006, and the second of which was released as a major single in 2007. The major single release peaked at #50 on the Oricon weekly chart.

"Onegai Miwaku no Target/Crazy Happy!" was originally released in 2006 as a double A-side indies single. In 2007, Onegai Miwaku no Target was remixed and re-released as a major single, for which a PV was created. Crazy Happy! was later released as a bonus track on the coupling compilation album URA MELON. Onegai Miwaku no Target - Original new ver. was used as the ending theme of the TV Tokyo music programme Onryū ~On Ryu~.

On March 31, 2012, the idol group Up-Up Girls from Up-Front Agency released this with a new arrangement as the b-side to their indies debut single, Going my ↑.

== Track listing ==
=== Indies Version ===
1. Onegai Miwaku no Target (お願い魅惑のターゲット, Please, Captivating Target)
2. Crazy Happy!
3. Onegai Miwaku no Target (Instrumental) (お願い魅惑のターゲット(instrumental))
4. Crazy Happy! (Instrumental) (Crazy Happy!(instrumental))

=== Major Version ===
1. Onegai Miwaku no Target ~Mango Purine Mix~ (お願い魅惑のターゲット ～マンゴープリン Mix～)
2. Onegai Miwaku no Target - Original new ver. (お願い魅惑のターゲット オリジナルnew ver.)
3. Onegai Miwaku no Target - Original new ver. (Instrumental) (お願い魅惑のターゲット オリジナルnew ver.(Instrumental))
