= The Nimaime =

Studio album by Melon Kinenbi
- Released: December 1, 2004
- Genre: J-pop
- Label: Zetima
- Producer: Tsunku

Melon Kinenbi chronology
1st Anniversary (2003)	The Nimaime (2004)	Fruity Killer Tune (2006)

The Nimaime (THE 二枚目, "The Second") is the second album from the J-pop group Melon Kinenbi, containing five of their singles, released on December 1, 2004. Since Tsunku was inactive at the time, it was produced by the other members of Sharam Q instead. Its highest ranking on the Oricon weekly chart was #28, and it charted for two weeks.

== Track listing ==
1. "Champagne no Koi" (シャンパンの恋, "Champagne Love")
2. "Namida no Taiyō" (涙の太陽, "Tears of the Sun")
3. "Setsunasa Ranking" (刹那さ Ranking)
4. "Chance of Love" (チャンス of LOVE)
5. "Kirai, Suki Suki Suki Honto, Uso Uso Uso" (キライ，スキスキスキ ホント，ウソウソウソ)
6. "Kawaii Kare" (かわいい彼, "Cute Guy")
7. "Lemon Tart" (レモンタルト)
8. "Mi Da Ra Matenrō" (MI DA RA 摩天楼, "Mi Da Ra Skyscraper")
9. "Aishite wa Ikenai..." (愛してはいけない…, "It's Not Love...")
10. "Last Scene" (ラストシーン)
11. "Doryoku - Kei - Bijin" (努力・系・美人, "Endeavour - Group - Beauty")
12. "The Nimaime (On My Way)" (THE 二枚目～ON MY WAY～, "The Second (On My Way)")
