= Friends (Erina Mano album) =

Studio album by Erina Mano
- Released: December 16, 2009
- Recorded: 2008–2009
- Genre: J-pop; electropop; dance-pop
- Label: hachama
- Producer: Taisei

Erina Mano chronology
Friends (2009)	More Friends (2010)

Singles from Friends
- 1. "Manopiano" Released: June 29, 2008; 2. "Lucky Aura" Released: October 4, 2008; 3. "Lalala-Sososo" Released: December 13, 2008; 4. "Otome no Inori" Released: March 18, 2009; 5. "Hajimete no Keiken" Released: May 20, 2009; 6. "Sekai wa Summer Party" Released: July 29, 2009; 7. "Kono Mune no Tokimeki o" Released: September 30, 2009

Friends is the debut album by Japanese idol artist Erina Mano.

== Introduction ==
Released December 16, 2009 in Japan under the label Hachama, under Hello! Project, the album is produced by Taisei (たいせい), former member of the group Sharam Q. It reached the 33rd place of Oricon Albums Chart.

It also comes in limited with a different cover and a DVD extra edition.

== Track listing ==
CD
No.	Title	Music	Length
1.	"Otome no Inori" (乙女の祈り)	KAN	4:55
2.	"Osozaki Musume" (OSOZAKI 娘)	Hatake	3:58
3.	"Sekai wa Summer Party" (世界は サマー・パーティ)	KAN	4:14
4.	"Itsumo Itsudemo" (いつもいつでも)	Taisei	4:06
5.	"Lalala-Sososo" (ラララ-ソソソ)	KAN	3:59
6.	"Hajimete no Keiken" (はじめての経験)	KAN	3:54
7.	"Lucky Aura" (ラッキーオーラ)	KAN	4:58
8.	"Santa no Saxophone" (サンタのサキソフォン)	Taisei	3:50
9.	"Kono Mune no Tokimeki wo" (この胸のときめきを)	Hatake	3:57
10.	"Matsuge no Saki ni Kimi ga Iru" (まつげの先に君がいる)	Hatake	4:32
11.	"Oyasuminasai" (おやすみなさい)	Hatake	4:56
12.	"Manopiano (Album ver.)" (マノピアノ)	KAN	3:56

Limited edition DVD

1. Manoeri History (まのえりHISTORY?)

== Personnel ==
- KAN (かん) – Programmation / Music / Lyrics
- Taisei (たいせい) – Programmation / Piano / Percussions
- Yasuo Asai (朝井泰生) – Programmation / Guitar
- Satoshi Takahashi Ichi (高橋諭一) – Programmation / Acoustic Guitar / Backing vocal
- Hachi Sekiguchi-gen (関口源八) – Percussions
- Seisoku Suzuki (鈴木正則) – Trompet
- Yoshinari Take-jō (竹上良成) – Saxophone
- Atsuko Inaba (稲葉貴子) – Backing vocal
- Ochiai Yūko (落合夕子) – Backing vocal
- Atsushi Shindō (新堂敦士) – Backing vocal
- S/mileage (スマイレージ) – Backing vocal
- Kaori Nishina (仁科かおり) – Backing vocal
- Yoshiko Miura (三浦徳子) – Lyrics
- Hatake (畠山俊昭) – Music
- Solaya (ソラヤ) – Programmation
- Yūgo Sasakura (佐々倉有吾) – Programmation
