= Ayano Sato =

Ayano Sato may refer to:

- Ayano Sato (canoeist) (born 1996), Japanese slalom canoeist
- Ayano Sato (singer) (born 1995), Japanese singer
- Ayano Sato (speed skater) (born 1996), Japanese speed skater
