= Ongaku Gatas =

Japanese girl group

Ongaku Gatas 音楽ガッタス
- Origin: Tokyo, Japan
- Genres: Pop
- Years active: 2007-2010
- Label: Zetima
- Members: Hitomi Yoshizawa; Rika Ishikawa; Miki Korenaga; Minami Sengoku
- Past members: Asami Konno; Erina Mano; Mika Mutō; Yuri Sawada; Arisa Noto; Mai Satoda
- Website: www.gatas-brilhantes-hp.net/ongakugatas

Ongaku Gatas (音楽ガッタス, Ongaku Gattasu) was a Japanese girl group consisted of select members from Hello! Project's futsal club Gatas Brilhantes H.P. and Hello Pro Egg.

== History ==
The group was formed in 2007. The group's name combines the Japanese word ongaku (music) with the Portuguese word gatas, taken from the name of the Hello! Project futsal team, Gatas Brilhantes (that means Bright Female Cats). Together, the two words literally mean "musical cats" (gatas being the feminine form of the word gatos (cats)), although gatas is also slang for "pretty girls".

In early 2008, Erina Mano and Mika Mutō (both Hello! Pro Eggs) graduated from the group. Mano left the group but continued as solo singer within Hello! Project, whereas Mutō left both the group and Hello! Project in its entirety to return to life as a normal student and focus on her studies.

In August 2009, it was announced that Arisa Noto and Yuri Sawada, two more Eggs, would both be graduating from Hello! Project. Sawada graduated from both Hello! Project and Ongaku Gatas, to focus on university. Noto, however, remained in the group, even though she had graduated from Hello! Project.

Although, soon after their winter tour finished in early 2009, Hitomi Yoshizawa, Rika Ishikawa, Asami Konno and Mai Satoda, all officially graduated from Hello! Project in March 2009 the group remained together, though they switched management to Up-Front Agency (the "parent management" of Hello! Project itself). The group went on a hiatus after their graduation. However, they began to tour again in March 2010, playing a total of three venues (Osaka, Aichi prefecture and Tokyo) to promote their new single "Ready! Kick Off!!" released on March 3.

== Members ==
- Hitomi Yoshizawa (Leader)
- Rika Ishikawa
- Miki Korenaga (是永 美記, Korenaga Miki) (Hello! Pro Egg member)
- Minami Sengoku (仙石 みなみ, Sengoku Minami) (Hello! Pro Egg member)

=== Graduated members ===
- Erina Mano (graduated March 2, 2008)
- Mika Mutō (武藤 水華, Mutō Mika) (graduated April 28, 2008)
- Yuri Sawada (澤田 由梨, Sawada Yuri) (graduated August 30, 2009)
- Asami Konno (graduated April 4, 2011)
- Arisa Noto
- Mai Satoda

== Discography ==
=== Albums ===
| # | Title | Release date |
|---|---|---|
| 1 | "1st Goodsal" | 2008-02-06 |

=== Singles ===
| # | Title | Release dates | |
| # | Title | CD single | Single V |
|---|---|---|---|
| 1 | "Narihajimeta Koi no Bell" | 2007-09-12 | 2007-09-12 |
| 2 | "Yattarōze!" (やったろうぜ!) | 2007-12-05 | 2007-12-19 |
| 3 | "Come Together" | 2008-09-10 | 2008-09-24 |
| 4 | "Ready! Kick Off!!" | 2010-03-06 | |

== DVD ==
| # | Title | Release date |
|---|---|---|
| 1 | "Ongaku Gatas First Concert Tour 2008 Spring: Mi-sal, Shuku-sal, Goodsal!" (音楽ガッタス ファーストコンサートツアー2008春～魅ザル 祝ザル GOODSAL！～) | 2008-05-28 |
| 2 | "Ongaku Gatas Live Tour 2008 Winter: Come Together!" (音楽ガッタス ライブツアー2008冬 ～Come Together！～) | 2009-03-11 |
