= Sweet Suicide Summer Story =

"sweet suicide summer story"

Single by Melon Kinenbi & Midori

from the album Melon's Not Dead
- Released: August 12, 2009
- Recorded: 2009
- Genre: J-pop, pop punk, alternative, art pop
- Label: Up-Front Works

Melon Kinenbi singles chronology
"Pinch wa Chance – Baka ni Narō ze!" (2009)	"sweet suicide summer story" (2009)	"Seishun on the Road" (2009)

"Sweet Suicide Summer Story" is the third indie single by Japanese girl group Melon Kinenbi, in collaboration with Midori. It was released in limited distribution on August 12, 2009. The single was sold on the Tower Records online store with purchasers receiving an original computer wallpaper.

== Track listing ==
1. sweet suicide summer story
2. sweet suicide summer story (Instrumental)
