= Charisma – Kirei =

"Charisma - Kirei"

Single by Melon Kinenbi

from the album Melon Juice
- Released: March 19, 2008
- Genre: J-pop
- Label: Zetima
- Producer(s): Taisei

Melon Kinenbi singles chronology
| "Onegai Miwaku no Target" (2007) | "Charisma - Kirei" (2008) | "Don't Say Good-Bye" (2009) |

"Charisma - Kirei" (カリスマ・綺麗, Charisma - Beauty) is the second single by Japanese girl group Melon Kinenbi. It was released on March 19, 2008, and its highest position on the Oricon weekly chart was #62. This was the final single Melon Kinenbi released as part of Hello! Project, before their official graduation at the end of March along with the rest of the Elder Club.

== Track listing ==
1. Charisma - Kirei (カリスマ・綺麗, Charisma - Beauty)
2. Onna Zakari (オンナザカリ, Woman's Prime)
3. Charisma - Kirei (Instrumental) (カリスマ・綺麗（Instrumental）)
