= Nissin Power Station =

Music venue in Tokyo, Japan

Nissin Power Station [Reboot]
- 日清食品 POWER STATION [REBOOT]
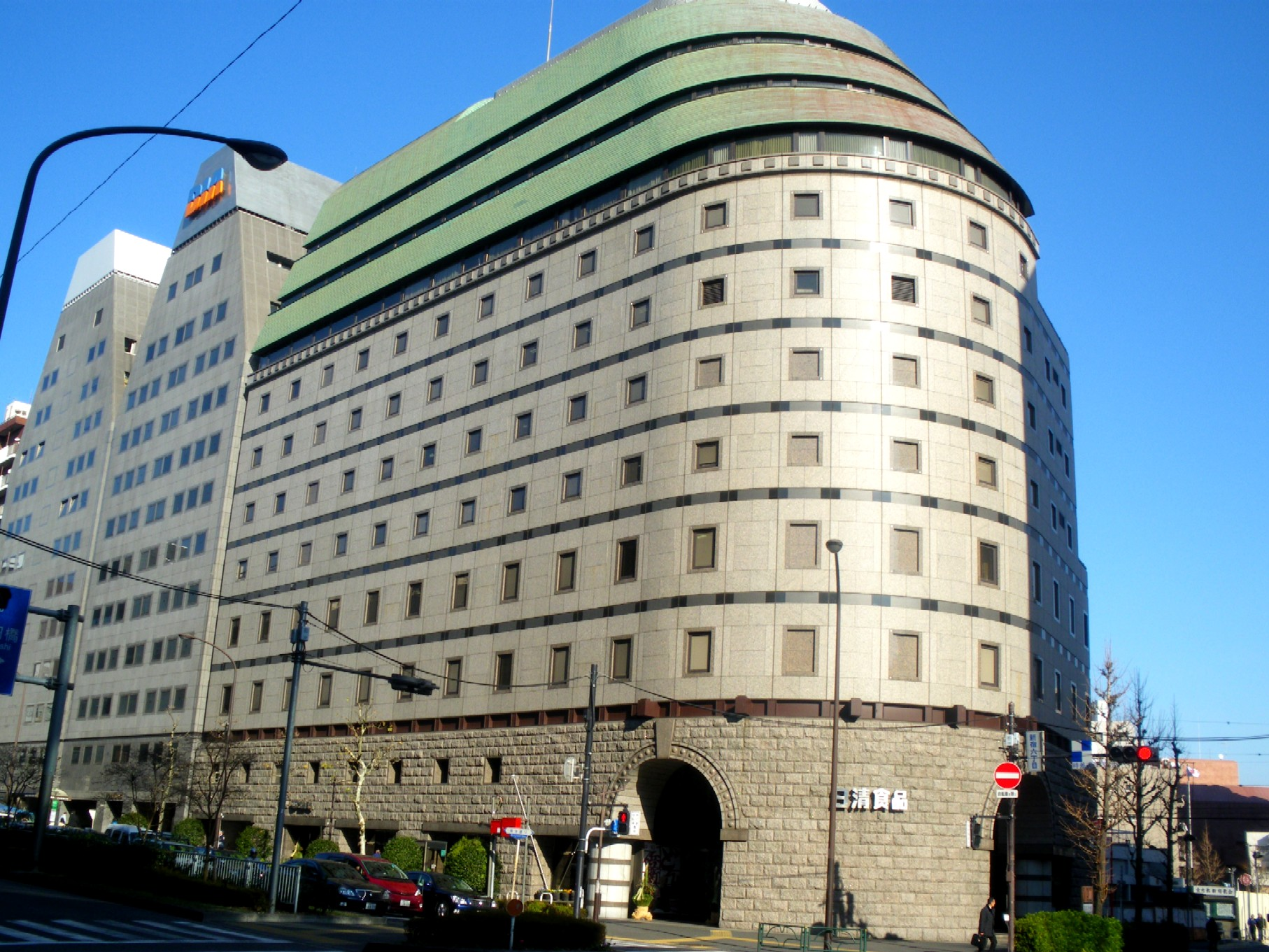
- The head office of Nissin Foods, where the venue is located, in 2009
- Former names: Nissin Power Station (日清パワーステーション)
- Address: 6 Chome-28-1 Shinjuku, Tokyo 160-8524, Japan; Shinjuku, Tokyo; Japan
- Owner: Nissin Foods
- Operator: Nissin Foods
- Capacity: 700 people
- Type: Music venue

Construction
- Opened: 11 March 1988 (original); 21 November 2020 (Reboot)
- Closed: June 30, 1998 (original)
- Years active: 1988–1998, 2020–present

Website
- nissin-ps.com

Nissin Power Station (Japanese: 日清パワーステーション, Hepburn: Nisshin Pawā Sutēshon), currently known as Nissin Power Station [Reboot] (日清食品 POWER STATION [REBOOT]), is a music venue in Shinjuku, Tokyo owned by Nissin Foods. The original venue was active from March 11, 1988, to June 30, 1998, before closing due to the company's mismanagement. The venue was closed until November 2020, when Nissin Foods announced that it would be reopening the venue for performances but without live audiences.

== Original venue (1988–1998) ==
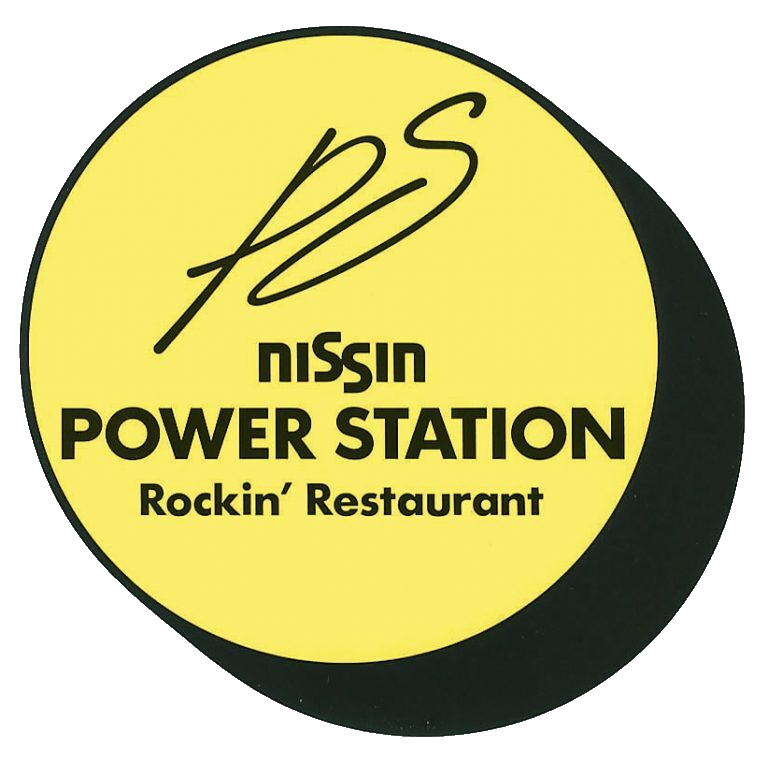
The original logo

The original Nissin Power Station was opened on March 11, 1988, when emerging live houses like Differ Ariake were opening in various parts of Tokyo during the second band boom at the height of the Japanese asset price bubble. With the catchphrase "Rockin' Restaurant," the venue gained popularity as a "fashionable live house where you can eat." Several cameras were installed and the stage was projected on the monitors during live performances. A radio program called "Nissin Power Station" was broadcast on Tokyo FM as well, with the audience being invited to the live performances of famous artists for free via a lottery through the broadcast.

Various band artists appeared throughout its lifespan, but due to the deterioration of the management of Nissin Foods at that time, the deficit division was completely closed, and with it the venue along with the restaurants on the first and second floors on June 30, 1998. After its closure, it was converted into an event hall at the head office, and the interior remains as it was at that time except the stage that was removed. In addition to being used for seminars, it is also used for game viewing and in-house support for players with official sponsors.

== Reopening as "Reboot" (2020–present) ==
The venue reopened on November 21, 2020, as Japan's first streaming-only live house specializing on streaming live music online with no live audience, the first of its kind in Japan. The underground hall of Nissin Foods Tokyo Headquarters where the original venue was located was renovated for the first time in 22 years. The performances are livestreamed due to the COVID-19 pandemic in Japan. The venue opened with an event called Kokeraotoshi 3Days (こけら落とし3DAYS), which included performances from singers and Vtubers.

Audiences can chat during the livestreams and donate for "Ultra Cheers," which livens up the performance. Using the original platform for viewing the livestreams, the transparent LED back panel and LED floor panel installed on the stage are linked with the chat.

== Notable appearances ==
=== Original venue ===
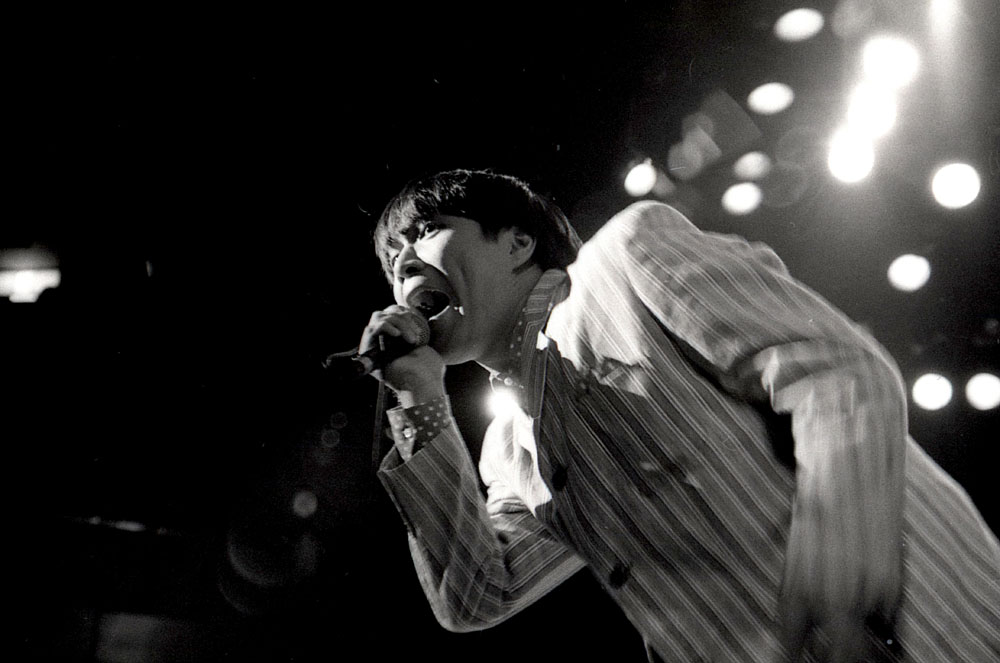
Hisashi Kato of The Collectors performing at Nissin Power Station in 1989

- Kiyoshiro Imawano
- The Collectors
- The Yellow Monkey
- Judy and Mary
- T-Square
- Carlos Toshiki & Omega Tribe
- Casiopea
- Yōsui Inoue
- Ulfuls
- Mitsuhiro Oikawa
- Kazumasa Oda
- Spitz
- Fishmans
- Chara
- Mr. Children
- Masayoshi Yamazaki
- L'Arc-en-Ciel

=== Reboot ===
- Takanori Nishikawa (November 21, 2020)
- Hoshimachi Suisei (November 22, 2020)
- Poppin'Party (November 23, 2020)
- Nightmare (December 13, 2020)
- FLOW (December 26, 2020)
- JAM Project (January 9, 2021)
- Kizuna AI and Sakurako Ohara (February 14, 2021)
