= Masaki Minami =

Japanese baseball player (born 1989)

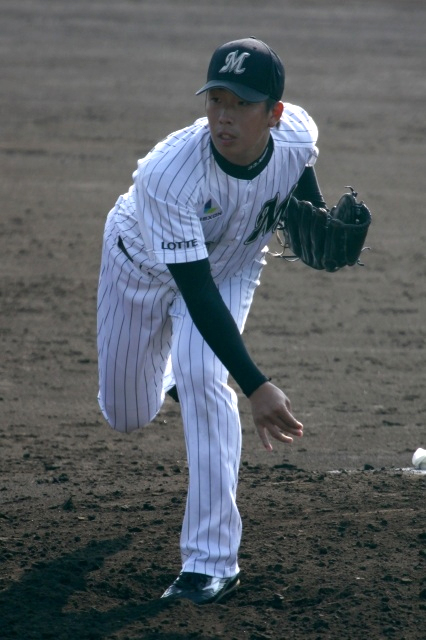
- Minami with the Chiba Lotte Marines

Chiba Lotte Marines – No. 85
- Pitcher / Coach
- Born: January 18, 1989 (age 37)
- Batted: Right Threw: Right

debut
- August 2, 2012, for the Chiba Lotte Marines

Last appearance
- October 30, 2021, for the Chiba Lotte Marines

Career statistics (through 2021 season)
- Win–loss record: 11–8
- ERA: 3.59
- Strikeouts: 183

Teams
- As player: Chiba Lotte Marines (2012–2014, 2016–2021); As coach: Chiba Lotte Marines (2025–present)

Masaki Minami (南 昌輝, Minami Masaki) (born January 18, 1989) is a Japanese former professional baseball pitcher and current coach for the Chiba Lotte Marines of Nippon Professional Baseball (NPB).

== Personal life ==
His wife is a Japanese singer Ayumi Shibata.
