= Emy Jackson =

Japanese female singer (born 1945)

- Born: Emy Eaton; 2 July 1945 (age 80); Essex

Emy Jackson (エミー・ジャクソン, born Emy Eaton, 2 July 1945) is a Japanese female singer.

== Biography ==
Emy Jackson was born in Essex, England, and moved to Yokohama as a teenager. She found work as a disc jockey for the Good Hit Parade on Radio Kanto.

In April 1965 her debut single Crying in a Storm was released. Jackson was promoted as a foreign artist. The single peaked at No. 4 on the chart of foreign releases in Music Life and No. 6 on the Turn Table Top 50. She is the first Japanese artist to have sold a million records singing in English (for Crying in a Storm).

Emy Jackson's initial musical career was a brief one. Between 1965 and 1966, she released 8 singles before retiring. In 1984 she released one single called "Cry Yokohama", and came out of retirement in the early 90s. She still performs today.

Crying in a Storm has been covered by many Japanese artists, usually in the Japanese language version retitled Namida no Taiyō (Tears of the Sun). The most famous one of these was done by 1970s idol Maria Anzai.
