= Aa! =

Japanese girl group

Aa! あぁ!
- Origin: Tokyo, Japan
- Genres: Pop
- Years active: 2003–2004, 2009–2011, 2015
- Label: Piccolo Town
- Spinoff of: Morning Musume; Hello! Project Kids
- Members: Miyabi Natsuyaki; Airi Suzuki
- Past members: Reina Tanaka (2003–2004); Akari Saho (2009–2011)
- Website: Hello! Project.com

Aa! (あぁ!) was a Japanese girl group under Hello! Project.

== Discography ==
=== Singles ===
#	Title	Release date	Charts	Composer	Lyricist
#	Title	Release date	JP	Composer	Lyricist
1	"First Kiss"	October 29, 2003	18	Tsunku	Tsunku
