= Don't Say Good-Bye (Melon Kinenbi song) =

2009 single by Beat Crusaders and Melon Kinenbi

Single by Melon Kinenbi & Beat Crusaders

from the album Melon's Not Dead
- Released: June 24, 2009
- Recorded: 2009
- Genre: J-pop, pop punk
- Length: 6:49
- Label: Up-Front Works
- Producer(s): Taisei

Melon Kinenbi singles chronology
""Charisma - Kirei"" (2008)	""Don't Say Good-Bye"" (2009)	""Pinchi wa Chansu - Baka ni Narō ze!"" (2009)

"Don't Say Good-Bye" is the first in the five-single series of indies collaboration singles by Japanese girl group Melon Kinenbi, in a collaboration with Beat Crusaders. It was released as limited distribution on June 24, 2009. People that purchased the single from the Tower Records online store received a free original computer wallpaper. The single peaked at #68 on the Oricon weekly charts, and charted for one week.

== Track listing ==
1. "Don't Say Good-Bye"
2. "Don't Say Good-Bye" (Instrumental)
