= Maria Anzai =

Japanese idol

- Born: December 16, 1953; Tokyo, Japan
- Died: March 15, 2014 (aged 60); Tokyo, Japan
- Occupations: Actress; Japanese idol

Maria Anzai (安西 マリア, Anzai Maria, b. Mariko Shibasaki on December 16, 1953 - d. March 15, 2014) was a Japanese idol.

== Biography ==
Maria Anzai made her debut in 1973 with a Japanese language version of "Namida no Taiyō", originally performed in English by Japanese singer Emy Jackson. The single sold over 500,000 copies. That same year she was nominated for Best Newcomer of the Year at the 15th Japan Record Awards, but was beaten by Junko Sakurada. She has also acted in movies and television series.

She retired from show business in 1978, married and emigrated to Hawaii. She released 12 singles between 1973 and 1978 and 4 albums.

She made a comeback in 2000.

Maria Anzai died on March 15, 2014.

== See also ==
- Kayōkyoku
- Japanese idol
- List of Japanese idols
