= More Friends Over =

Studio album by Erina Mano
- Released: March 28, 2012 Japan
- Recorded: 2011–2012
- Genre: J-pop; electropop; dance-pop
- Label: hachama

Erina Mano chronology
More Friends (2010)	More Friends Over (2012)	Best Friends (2013)

Singles from More Friends Over
- 1. "Seishun no Serenade" Released: January 26, 2011; 2. "My Days for You" Released: June 29, 2011

More Friends Over is the third studio album by Japanese singer Erina Mano.

== Details ==
The album was released on 28 March 2012 in Japan under the label hachama. It reached the 27th place in the ranking of Oricon sales. It also comes in a limited edition with a different cover and a DVD containing extra video clips and making-of.

The album contains five tracks: eleven songs and four interludes, two of the songs were already previously released as singles in 2011: Seishun no Serenade and My Days for You. Those of single Doki Doki Baby/Tasogare Kosaten released the previous month are not included (but on the compilation Best Friends in 2013), although the making of his wallet and one of his video clip shown on the DVD.

This is her last studio album under Hello!Project.

== Track listing ==
CD
No.	Title	Length
1.	"Junjō Keisatsu K・I・S・S" (純情警察K・I・S・S)
2.	"Glory days"
3.	"Seishun no Serenade" (青春のセレナーデ)	4:31
4.	"~"Shinkō wa Michiko" no Jikan 1~ (" (～「進行はミチコ」の時間①～)
5.	"Eien ~Tasogare Kōsaten time goes by~" (永遠～黄昏交差点 time goes by～)
6.	"Nekketsu Sensei" (熱血先生)
7.	"I have a dream"
8.	"~"Shinkō wa Michiko" no Jikan 2~" (～「進行はミチコ」の時間②～)
9.	"Banzai! ~Jinsei wa Meccha Wonderful!~" (バンザイ! ～人生はめっちゃワンダッホーッ！～)
10.	"Kaze no Bara ~Aruite Chizu wo Tsukutta Otoko no Uta~" (風の薔薇～歩いて地図を作った男のウタ～)
11.	"Anata ga Iru Kara" (あなたがいるから)
12.	"~"Shinkō wa Michiko" no Jikan 3~" (～「進行はミチコ」の時間③～)
13.	"My Days for You"	4:26
14.	"Tenkiyohō ga Atattara" (天気予報があたったら)
15.	"~"Shinkō wa..."~" (～「進行は・・・」～)

Limited edition DVD
No.	Title	Length
1.	"Doki Doki Baby / Tasogare Kōsaten Jacket Making" (ドキドキベイビー/黄昏交差点 ジャケット撮影メイキング)
2.	"More Friends Over Jacket Making" (More Friends Over ジャケット撮影メイキング)
3.	"Tenkiyohō ga Atattara (Music Video)" (天気予報があたったら)
4.	"Glory days (Music Video)"
5.	"Tasogare Kōsaten (Music Video making)" (黄昏交差点 (Music Video撮影メイキング?))
6.	"Hello! Channel Making (...)" (ハロー!チャンネル撮影メイキング (二十歳の誓い))
