= Melon Tea =

Single by Melon Kinenbi & Going Under Ground

from the album Melon's Not Dead
- Released: December 30, 2009
- Recorded: 2009
- Genre: J-pop, pop punk
- Length: 6:49
- Label: Up-Front Works

Melon Kinenbi singles chronology
"Seishun on the Road" (2009)	"Melon Tea" (2009)

"Melon Tea" (メロンティー) is the fifth indie single by Japanese girl group Melon Kinenbi, in a collaboration with Going Under Ground. It was released as limited distribution on 30 December 2009. People who purchased the single from the Tower Records online store received a free original computer wallpaper.

== Track listing ==
1. Melon Tea (メロンティー)
2. Melon Tea (Instrumental) (メロンティー (Instrumental))
