= Melon's Not Dead =

Studio album by Melon Kinenbi
- Released: February 17, 2010
- Genre: J-pop; pop punk
- Label: Zetima
- Producer: Taisei

Melon Kinenbi chronology
| Melon Juice (2007) | Melon's Not Dead (2010) |

Singles from Melon's Not Dead
- 1. "Don't Say Good-Bye" Released: June 24, 2009; 2. "Pinch wa Chance – Baka ni Narō ze!" Released: July 22, 2009; 3. "Sweet Suicide Summer Story" Released: August 12, 2009; 4. "Seishun on the Road" Released: October 10, 2009; 5. "Melon Tea" Released: December 30, 2009

Melon's Not Dead is the fourth album from the J-pop group Melon Kinenbi released on February 17, 2010. It was their only original album after having graduated from Hello! Project. Most of the tracks are collaborations with various rock bands from the previous year. Its highest ranking on the Oricon weekly chart was #54, and it charted for two weeks.

== Track listing ==
1. "Melon Kinenbi no Theme (Rock Ver.)" (メロン記念日のテーマ (Rock Ver.); "Melon Kinenbi's Theme (Rock Ver.)")
2. "Don't Say Good-Bye" (DON'T SAY GOOD-BYE)
3. "Pinch wa Chance – Baka ni Narō ze! (Album Ver.)" (ピンチはチャンス バカになろうぜ (Album Ver.); A Pinch is a Chance, Let's Become Fools! (Album Ver.))
4. "sweet suicide summer story" (sweet suicide summer story)
5. "Seishun on the Road" (青春・オン・ザ・ロー; Youth on the Road)
6. "Melon Tea" (メロンティー; "Melon Tea")
7. "Romantic wo Tsukinukero" (ロマンチックを突きぬけろ〜Break it now〜; Break Through Romantic ~Break It Now~)
8. "All Around Rock" (ALL AROUND ROCK)
9. "Ai Da! Ima Sugu Rock On" (愛だ!今すぐROCK ON; "It's Love! Rock On Right Away")
10. "Always Love You" (ALWAYS LOVE YOU)
