= More Friends =

Studio album by Erina Mano
- Released: November 24, 2010
- Recorded: 2009–2010
- Genre: J-pop; electropop; dance-pop
- Label: hachama
- Producer: Taisei

Erina Mano chronology
Friends (2009)	More Friends (2010)	More Friends Over (2012)

Singles from More Friends
- 1. "Love & Peace = Paradise" Released: November 25, 2009; 2. "Haru no Arashi" Released: February 24, 2010; 3. "Onegai Dakara..." Released: May 12, 2010; 4. "Genkimono de Ikō!" Released: September 15, 2010

More Friends is the second studio album by Japanese idol singer Erina Mano. Released on November 24, 2010 in Japan under the label Hachama, under Hello! Project, the album is produced by Taisei (たいせい), former member of the group Sharam Q, and reached the 32nd place of Oricon. It also comes in a limited edition with a different cover and a DVD containing extra clips, movie listing and "making-of".

It contains five songs previously released as singles in 2009 and 2010: "Love & Peace = Paradise", "Haru no Arashi", "Onegai Dakara" and "Genkimono de Ikō!" in another version (and "B-side" Uchi e Kaerō; also in another version in the album), the latter two in revised versions for the album.

== Track listing ==
All lyrics are written by Yoshiko Miura

CD
No.	Title	Music	Length
1.	"Genkimono de Ikō! -Giga Power Mix-" (元気者で行こう！ -Giga power mix-)	Hatake	4:39
2.	"Gomen, Hanashitakatta Dake" (ごめん、話したかっただけ)	Tsunku	3:52
3.	"Dare ni mo Iwanai de" (ダレニモイワナイデ)	KAN	5:08
4.	"Do Re Mi Fa Dōshite?" (ドレミファどうして？)	Taisei	3:20
5.	"Love & Peace = Paradise" (Love & Peace = パラダイス)	Taisei	3:46
6.	"Tomorrow"	Taisei	4:59
7.	"Ambitious Girls"	Hatake	3:33
8.	"Datenshi Erī" (堕天使 エリー)	Taisei	5:01
9.	"Arashi no Mae no Candle" (嵐の前のキャンドル)	Hatake	4:47
10.	"Haru no Arashi" (春の嵐)	Tsunku	4:14
11.	"Uchi e Kaerō - Sad Ver." (家へ帰ろう sad ver. (Genkimono de Ikō! B-side))	Hatake	4:53
12.	"Onegai Dakara..." (お願いだから…)	Taisei	4:00

Limited edition DVD
No.	Title	Length
1.	"Genkimono de Ikō! (Director's Cut Ver.2)" (元気者で行こう！ (ディレクターズカットVER.2))
2.	"Mano Erina Dai Ichi Kai Kantoku Sakuhin Ongaku Geki "Nakaumi to Tadaki to Genkimono" (真野恵里菜 第一回監督作品 音楽劇 「半海と多田木と元気者」)
3.	"Onegai Dakara... (Gakuseifuku Jūhenge Ver.)" (お願いだから… (学生服十変化Ver.))
4.	"Kitty's Paradise Peace Kitty Kenkyūsho Mano Kenkyūin Taberu! 35 Renpatsu!!" (キティズパラダイスpeace キティ研究所 真野研究員食べる!35連発!!)
5.	"Eiga "Kaidan Shin Mimibukuro Kaiki" in Hollywood World Premiere Jōei ni Micchaku!!" (映画「怪談新耳袋 怪奇」 in ハリウッド ワールドプレミア上映に密着!!)
6.	"Album Jacket Satsuei Making Eizō" ((アルバムジャケット撮影メイキング映像))
