= Unforgettable (Melon Kinenbi song) =

Single by Melon Kinenbi

from the album Melon Juice
- Released: March 28, 2007
- Genre: J-pop
- Label: Zetima
- Producer(s): Taisei

Melon Kinenbi singles chronology
| "Onegai Miwaku no Target/Crazy Happy!" (2006) | "Unforgettable" (2007) | "Onegai Miwaku no Target" (2007) |

"Unforgettable" (アンフォゲッタブル) is the sixteenth single by Japanese girl group Melon Kinenbi. It was the first of Melon Kinenbi's singles to be produced by Sharam Q member Taisei. It was released on March 28, 2007, and its highest position on the Oricon weekly chart was #16.

== Track listing ==
1. Unforgettable (アンフォゲッタブル)
2. Sakura-iro no Yakusoku (サクラ色の約束, Cherry Blossom-Coloured Promise)
3. Unforgettable (Instrumental) (アンフォゲッタブル(Instrumental))
