= Pinch wa Chance – Baka ni Narō ze! =

"Pinchi wa Chansu - Baka ni Narō ze!"

Single by Melon Kinenbi & New Rote'ka

from the album Melon's Not Dead
- Released: July 22, 2009
- Recorded: 2009
- Genre: Pop punk
- Label: Up-Front Works

Melon Kinenbi & New Rote'ka singles chronology
"–"	"Pinchi wa Chansu - Baka ni Narō ze!"	"–"

Melon Kinenbi singles chronology
"Don't Say Good-Bye" (2009)	"Pinchi wa Chansu - Baka ni Narō ze!" (2009)	"sweet suicide summer story" (2009)

"Pinchi wa Chansu - Baka ni Narō ze!" (ピンチはチャンス バカになろうぜ！) is the second indies single by Japanese girl group Melon Kinenbi, in a collaboration with New Rote'ka (ニューロティカ, "Neurotica"). It was released as limited distribution on July 22, 2009. People that purchased the single from the Tower Records online store received a free original computer wallpaper.

== Track listing ==
1. Pinchi wa Chansu - Baka ni Narō ze! (ピンチはチャンス バカになろうぜ！)
2. Pinchi wa Chansu - Baka ni Narō ze! (Instrumental) (ピンチはチャンス バカになろうぜ！ (Instrumental))
