= Champagne no Koi =

Single by Melon Kinenbi

from the album The Nimaime
- Released: October 27, 2004
- Genre: J-pop, R&B
- Label: Zetima
- Songwriter: Chihiro Imai: Tsunku
- Producer: Tsunku

Melon Kinenbi singles chronology
"Namida no Taiyō" (2004)	"Champagne no Koi" (2004)	"Nikutai wa Shōjiki na Eros" (2005)

"Champagne no Koi" (シャンパンの恋, Champagne Love) is the thirteenth single by Japanese girl group Melon Kinenbi. It was released on October 27, 2004, and its highest position on the Oricon weekly chart was #25.

== Track listing ==
1. Champagne no Koi (シャンパンの恋, Champagne Love)
2. Koi no Shikumi. (恋の仕組み。, Love's Contrivance.)
3. Champagne no Koi (Instrumental) (シャンパンの恋（Instrumental）)
