= Natsu no Yoru wa Danger! =

Single by Melon Kinenbi

from the album 1st Anniversary
- Released: June 19, 2002
- Genre: J-pop; electropop
- Label: Zetima

Melon Kinenbi singles chronology
"Saa! Koibito ni Narō" (2002)	"Natsu no Yoru wa Danger!" (2002)	"Kōsui" (2002)

"Natsu no Yoru wa Danger!" (夏の夜はデインジャー!, Dangerous Summer Night!) is the sixth single by Japanese girl group Melon Kinenbi. It was released on June 19, 2002, and its highest position on the Oricon weekly chart was #14.

An English-language cover ("Dangerous Summer Night!") was recorded by Maysa Leak for the album Cover Morning Musume Hello! Project!.

== Track listing ==
1. "Natsu no Yoru wa Danger!" (夏の夜はデインジャー!, Dangerous Summer Night!)
2. "Ai Meramera - Koi Yurayura" (愛メラメラ 恋ユラユラ)
3. "Natsu no Yoru wa Danger!" (Instrumental)
