= Kokuhaku Kinenbi =

2000 single by Melon Kinenbi

Single by Melon Kinenbi

from the album 1st Anniversary
- Released: June 28, 2000
- Genre: J-pop
- Label: Zetima
- Producer(s): Tsunku

Melon Kinenbi singles chronology
"Amai Anata no Aji" (2000)	"Kokuhaku Kinenbi" (2000)	"Denwa Matteimasu" (2001)

"Kokuhaku Kinenbi" (告白記念日, Confession Day) is the second single by Japanese girl group Melon Kinenbi. It was used as the theme song of the internet information delivery service Tottoco. Its highest position on the Oricon weekly chart was #42.

== Track listings ==
=== CD ===
1. Kokuhaku Kinenbi (告白記念日, Confession Day)
2. Fuwafuwafū (ふわふわふー)
3. Kokuhaku Kinenbi (Instrumental) (告白記念日（Instrumental）)
