= Melon Kinenbi =

Japanese pop group

- Origin: Tokyo, Japan
- Genres: J-pop; R&B; pop punk; electropop; dance-pop
- Years active: 1999–2010, 2011, 2013, 2018
- Labels: Zetima
- Past members: Hitomi Saito; Megumi Murata; Masae Ōtani; Ayumi Shibata
- Website: Up-Front Agency

Melon Kinenbi (メロン記念日; sometimes romanized as Melon Kinen-Bi) are an all-girl Japanese pop group within Hello! Project. They were formed after they successfully passed the 2nd Morning Musume & Michiyo Heike Imotobun Audition. Melon Kinenbi is the oldest group in the history of Hello! Project not to have changed any of its members since its formation. The band occasionally worked as dancers for other Hello! Project artists; they can, for instance, be seen in the music video for Maki Goto's single "Yaruki! It's Easy".

The entire group officially graduated from the Hello! Project on March 31, 2009, along with the rest of the Elder Club. After their graduation, they collaborated with other Japanese punk-rock groups for several limited-release indie singles, and released their 4th album Melon's Not Dead. Two days after the album release and just after their 10-year anniversary, the group announced that they would disband following their final tour activities in May 2010. The group performed together for the last time on May 3, at Nakano Sun Plaza, although Melon Kinenbi reunited temporarily in April 2011 to help the efforts following the 2011 Tōhoku earthquake and tsunami. On December 31, 2013, Melon Kinenbi reunited a second time to perform at the Hello! Project Countdown Party 2013 〜Good Bye & Hello!〜 event. In October 2018, Melon Kinenbi reunited a third time to perform at the Hello! Project 20th Anniversary!! Hello! Project Hello! Face 2018 event in Saitama.

== Members ==
Name	Birth date	Age	Member colour*	Notes
Hitomi Saito	October 31, 1981	44	Purple	Leader
Megumi Murata	March 3, 1981	44	Light Blue	Sub-leader
Masae Ōtani	February 25, 1982	43	Green	
Ayumi Shibata	February 22, 1984	41	Red	

== Discography ==
=== Albums ===
#	Title	Release date
1	1st Anniversary	2003-03-12
2	The Nimaime (The 二枚目)	2004-12-01
3	Melon Juice (Mini-album)	2007-12-12
4	Melon's Not Dead	2010-02-17

=== Greatest Hits albums ===
#	Title	Release date
1	Fruity Killer Tune	2006-12-06
2	Mega Melon	2008-12-10
3	Ura Melon; Coupling tracks collection	2010-04-21

=== Singles ===
#	Title	Release Date	Misc. Info
1	"Amai Anata no Aji" (甘いあなたの味,, Your Sweet Taste)	2000-02-28	Second ending theme of Sorcerous Stabber Orphen
2	"Kokuhaku Kinenbi" (告白記念日,, Confession Day)	2000-06-28	
3	"Denwa Matteimasu" (電話待っています,, Call Waiting)	2001-03-07	
4	"This Is Unmei" (This is 運命, This is Fate)	2001-10-11	
5	"Saa! Koibito ni Narō" (さぁ!恋人になろう)	2002-02-14	
6	"Natsu no Yoru wa Danger!" (夏の夜はデインジャー!, Dangerous Summer Night!)	2002-06-19	
7	"Kōsui (香水, Perfume)"	2002-10-23	
8	"Akai Freesia" (赤いフリージア, Red Freesia)	2003-01-29	Audition song for the sixth generation of Morning Musume
9	"Chance of Love" (チャンス of Love)	2003-05-08	
10	"Mi Da Ra Matenrō" (Mi Da Ra 摩天楼, Mi Da Ra Skyscraper)	2003-09-10	
11	"Kawaii Kare" (かわいい彼, He's Cute)	2003-12-03	
12	"Namida no Taiyō" (涙の太陽, Tears of the Sun)	2004-06-09	
13	"Champagne no Koi" (シャンパンの恋, Champagne Love)	2004-10-27	
14	"Nikutai wa Shōjiki na Eros" (肉体は正直なEros, The Body of a True Eros)	2005-02-09	
15	"Onegai Miwaku no Target/Crazy Happy!" (お願い魅惑のターゲット/Crazy Happy!, Please, Captivating Target/Crazy Happy!) (Indies)	2006-06-10	
16	"Unforgettable" (アンフォゲッタブル)	2007-03-28	
17	"Onegai Miwaku no Target" (お願い魅惑のターゲット, Please, Captivating Target) (major release)	2007-09-05	
18	"Charisma - Kirei" (カリスマ・綺麗, Charisma - Beauty)	2008-03-19	

=== Collaboration singles ===
#	Title	Release date
1	"Don't Say Good-Bye"	2009-06-24
2	"Pinchi wa Chansu - Baka ni Narō ze!" (ピンチはチャンス バカになろうぜ!)	2009-07-22
3	"Sweet Suicide Summer Story"	2009-08-12
4	"Seishun on the Road" (青春・オン・ザ・ロード, Youth on the Road)	2009-10-21
5	"Melon Tea" (メロンティー)	2009-12-30

=== Unreleased ===
"Romantic wo Tsukinukero!" (ロマンチックを突き抜けろ！; "Breakthrough Romantic!") (debuted at their 2009 tour)

=== DVDs ===
Title	Release Date
Melon Kinenbi Single M Clips 1 (メロン記念日シングルMクリップス1)	2002-11-27
Cyborg Shibata (サイボーグしばた)	2002-12-05
Captain Shibata (キャプテンしばた)	2002-12-05
Melon Kinenbi Live Tour 2003 Haru: 1st Anniversary (メロン記念日Live Tour 2003春～1st Anniversary～)	2003-05-08
Melon Kinenbi Single V Clips 2 (メロン記念日シングルVクリップス2)	2003-12-03
Melon Kinenbi: '03 Christmas Special Chōjibu Melon (メロン記念日 ～03’クリスマススペシャル超渋メロン～)	2004-02-11
Shin Cyborg Shibata!! (新サイボーグしばたっ!!)	2004-09-29
Melon Kinenbi Live Tour 2004 Natsu ~Gokujou Melon~ (メロン記念日ライブツアー2004夏～極上メロン～)	2004-11-25
Tatakae!! Cyborg Shibata 3 (闘え!!サイボーグしばた)	2005-09-28
Hello Pro Party~! 2005: Aya Matsuura Captain Kōen (ハロ☆プロ パーティ～！2005～松浦亜弥キャプテン公演～)	2005-12-07
Melon Kinenbi Concert Tour 2005 Fuyu "Kyō mo Melon Kinenbi Ashita mo Melon, Christmas wa Musk Melon de!" (メロン記念日コンサートツアー2005冬「今日もメロン明日もメロン、クリスマスはマスクメロンで！」)	2006-03-15
Melon Kinenbi Concert Tour 2006 Fuyu ｢FRUITY KILLER TUNE｣ (メロン記念日 コンサートツアー2006冬「FRUITY KILLER TUNE」)	2007-03-28
Hello☆Pro On Stage! 2007 "Rock desu yo!" (ハロ☆プロ オンステージ！2007 『Rockですよ！』)	2007-04-25
Melon Kinenbi Single V Clips 3 (メロン記念日シングルVクリップス3)	2007-05-09
Kettei! Hello☆Pro Awards '09 -Elder Club Sotsugyō Kinen Special- (決定!ハロ☆プロ アワード’09 ~エルダークラブ卒業記念スペシャル~ Hello! Project 2009 Winter)	2009-04-15
Melon Kinenbi Final Stage "Melon's Not Dead (メロン記念日 FINAL STAGE "MELON'S NOT DEAD")	2010-07-14

=== Photobooks ===
- 2004 – Hello! Project 2004 Winter Melon Kinenbi (Hello! Project 2004 winter メロン記念日)
- 2004 – Melon Kinenbi First Shashinshū "Taiyō to Kajitsu" (メロン記念日ファースト写真集「太陽と果実)
- 2004 – Hello! Project 2004 Summer Melon Kinenbi (Hello! Project 2004 summer メロン記念日)

== Appearances ==
=== Television ===
- Morning Musume no Heso (モーニング娘。のへそ)
- Idol wo Sagase (アイドルをさがせ!)
- Majokko Rika-chan no Magical v-u-den (魔女っ娘。梨華ちゃんのマジカル美勇伝)
- Tensai Terebikun Max (天才てれびくんMax)
- Musume Dokyu (娘Dokyu)

=== Radio ===
- Colorful Pleasure
- Hyper Night Melon Kinenbi no "Meronpa" (ハイパーナイト・メロン記念日の「めろんぱ」)
- Mijōku! Soujōku!! Seijoku!!! Kanjōku!!!! (未熟! 早熟!! 成熟!!! 完熟!!!!, Immature! Precocious!! Mature!!! Totally Matured!!!!)
- Hello Pro Yanen

=== Internet ===
- The Moving Radio Korette Yappari Melon Kibun (The moving Radio これってやっぱりメロン気分)

=== Musicals ===
- Love Century -Yume wa Minna Kerya Hajimaranai-
- Sōgen no Hito
- Okaeri

=== Events ===
- 2005 – July Hello! Project Fan Club Gentei Event

=== Concerts ===
- 2002 – First Concert "Kore ga Kinenbi" (ファーストコンサート「これが記念日」, First Concert "This is Kinen-Bi")
- 2003 – Melon Kinenbi Live Tour 2003 Haru ~1st Anniversary~ (メロン記念日Live Tour 2003春～1st Anniversary～, Melon Kinenbi Live Tour 2003 Spring -1st Anniversary-)
- 2003 – Melon Kinenbi Live Tour 2003 Summer ~Natsu Melon~ (メロン記念日ライブツアー2003Summer ～夏メロン～, Melon Kinenbi Live Tour 2003Summer -Summer Melon-)
- 2003 – Melon Kinenbi Concert 2003.12.13-14 ~'03 Christmas Special Chōjibu Melon~ (メロン記念日 単独コンサート2003年12月13・14日 ～'03クリスマススペシャル 超渋メロン～)
- 2004 – Melon Kinenbi Live Tour 2004 Haru ~Mō Hore Chauzo!~ (メロン記念日ライブツアー2004春 ～もぅ ホレちゃうぞ！～)
- 2004 – Melon Kinenbi Special Live 2004 ~Bonus~ (メロン記念日スペシャルライブ2004～ボーナス！～)
- 2004 – Melon Kinenbi Live Tour 2004 Natsu (メロン記念日ライブツアー2004夏)
- 2004 – Melon Kinenbi Concert Tour 2004 Fuyu ~The Melon Show~ (メロン記念日コンサートツアー2004冬 ～ザ☆メロンショー！～)
- 2005 – Hello Project! Matsuura Aya Captain Kouen~ (ハロ☆プロ パーティ～!2005～松浦亜弥キャプテン公演～)
- 2005 – Shin Himejishi Tanjō Kinen Matsuura Aya W Melon Kinenbi Concert in Himeji Shiro ~Matsura Aya Satogaeri SPECIAL~ (新姫路市誕生記念 松浦亜弥・W・メロン記念日 コンサート in 姫路城～松浦亜弥 里帰りスペシャル～)
- 2005 – Hello Project! Matsuura Aya Captain Kōen Neo~ (ハロ☆プロ パーティ～!2005～松浦亜弥キャプテン公演Neo～)
- 2005 – Melon Kinenbi Concert Tour 2005 Fuyu "Kyō mo Melon, Ashita mo Melon, Christmas wa Masuku Melon de!" (メロン記念日 コンサートツアー2005冬『今日もメロン明日もメロン、クリスマスはマスクメロンで！』)
