= The Collectors (Japanese band) =

Japanese rock band

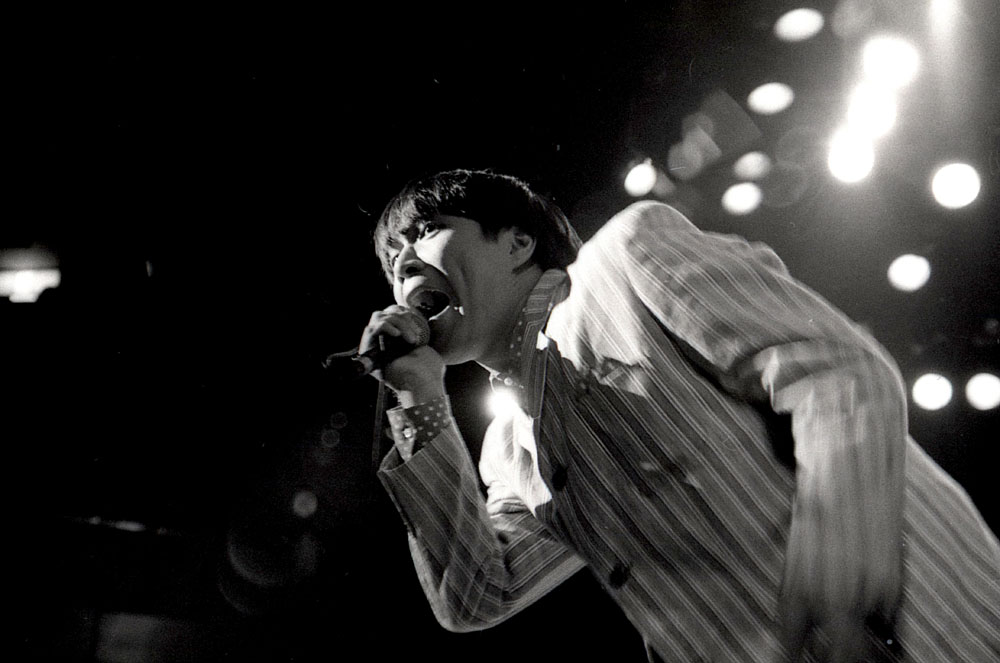
- Hisashi Kato with The Collectors at Nissin Power Station, 1989

Background information
- Origin: Japan
- Genres: Rock, neo mods, psychedelic rock
- Years active: 1986–present
- Labels: Mint Sound Records (1986); Teichiku Records (1987–1991); Nippon Columbia (1991–present)
- Members: Hisashi Kato; Kotaro Furuichi; Masayuki "Jeff" Yamamori; Takayuki "cozi" Furusawa
- Past members: Kosaku Abe; Makoto Ori "Ringo" Tamaki; Toshiharu "Chorkey" Itou; Daimyo; Yukihiro Katsumoto
- Website: thecollectors.jp

External videos
- on Official YouTube Channel(in Japanese)
- ザ・コレクターズ / 悪の天使と正義の悪魔 on YouTube

The Collectors (ザ・コレクターズ) are a Japanese rock band formed in 1986. They are one of the foremost Japanese mod bands, and have enjoyed a long-running career spanning 25 studio albums. In 2017, they played a one-man concert at the Nippon Budokan arena to mark their 30th anniversary.

The band has achieved some commercial success with their hit songs "The World on Pause" (世界を止めて) and "Evil Angel and Righteous Devil" (悪の天使と正義の悪魔). Their music has also been featured in the popular anime series Kochira Katsushika-ku Kameari Kōen-mae Hashutsujo and Dragon Ball Super.

== Members ==
- Hisashi Kato (加藤ひさし, Katō Hisashi) – vocals, songwriting
- Kotaro Furuichi (古市コータロー, Furuichi Kōtarō) – guitar
- Masayuki "Jeff" Yamamori (山森 JEFF 正之, Yamamori Jeff Masayuki) – bass
- Takayuki "cozi" Furusawa (古沢 "cozi" 岳之, Takayuki Côzi Furusawa) – drums

Former members

- Kosaku Abe (阿部耕作, Abe Kôsaku) – drums (1986–1991)
- Makoto Ori (小里誠, Ori Makoto) – bass (1991–2014)
- "Ringo" Tamaki (リンゴ田巻, Ringo Tamaki) – drums (1986–1991)
- Toshiharu "Chorkey" Itou (チョーキーとしはる, Chorkey Toshiharu) – bass (1986–1991)
- Daimyo (大名, Daimyō) – guitar (1986)
- Yukihiro Katsumoto (勝本幸浩, Katsumoto Yukihiro) – bass (1986)

== Discography ==
Main albums

#	Information
Indies	Yokoso Ohanabatake to Mushroom Okoku e (Read as "Welcome To The Flower Fields And The Mushroom Kingdom"): Released: 1987; Label: Indies
1st	Bokuwa Collector (Read as "I'm a Collector"): Released: 1987; Label: Teichiku
2nd	Niji iro Circus dan (Read as "Niji-iro Circus"): Released: 1988; Label: Teichiku
3rd	Boku wo Kunou Saseru Samazama na Kaibutsu tachi (Read as "My Dear Various Disturbing Monsters"): Released: 1989; Label: Teichiku
4th	Picturesque Collectors' Land (Maboroshi no Kuni no Collectors): Released: 1990; Label: Teichiku
5th	Collector Number.5: Released: 1991; Label: Columbia
6th	Ufo Cluv: Released: 1993; Label: Columbia
7th	Candyman: Released: 1994; Label: Columbia
8th	Free: Released: 1995; Label: Columbia
9th	Mighty Blow: Released: 1996; Label: Columbia
10th	Here Today: Released: 1997; Label: Columbia
11th	Beat Symphonic: Released: 1999; Label: Columbia
12th	Supersonic Sunrise: Released: 2001; Label: Columbia
13th	Glitter Tune: Released: 2002; Label: Columbia
14th	Yoake to Mirai to Mirai no Katachi ("The Future in the Shade of Dawn"): Released: 2005; Label: Indies
15th	Rock Kyoshitsu ("The Rock 'n Roll Culture School"): Released: 2006; Label: Columbia
16th	Tokyo Mushi Bugs: Released: 2007; Label: Columbia
17th	Seishun Mirror (Kimi wo Omou Nagai Gogo): Released: 2010; Label: Columbia
18th	Chikyu no Aruki kata ("The Way We Walk Around The Globe"): Released: 2011; Label: Columbia
19th	Kyujyu-kyu hiki me no Saru ("The 99th Monkey"): Released: 2013; Label: Columbia
20th	Nariyama nai Love Song ("Singing in Love"): Released: 2014; Label: Columbia
21st	Iitai-koto Ienai-koto Iisobireta-koto: Released: 2015; Label: Columbia
22nd	Roll Up the Collectors: Released: 2016; Label: Columbia
23rd	Young Man Rock: Released: 2018; Label: Columbia
24th	Bessekai Ryoko (A Trip in Any Other World): Released: 2020; Label: Columbia
25th	Juicy Marmalade: Released: 2022; Label: Columbia
26th	Heart no King ha Kuchihige ga nai ("The King of Hearts has no mustache"): Released: 2024; Label: Columbia
