= Genkimono de Ikō! =

- Normal edition cover

Single by Erina Mano

from the album More Friends
- B-side: "Uchi e Kaerō"
- Released: September 15, 2010
- Recorded: 2010
- Genre: Pop
- Length: 13:39
- Label: Hachama
- Composer: Hatake
- Lyricist: Yoshiko Miura
- Producer: Taisei

Erina Mano singles chronology
"Onegai Dakara..." (2010)	"Genkimono de Ikō!" (2010)	"Seishun no Serenade" (2011)

Music videos
- Genkimono de Ikō! on YouTube on YouTube
- Genkimono de Ikō! on YouTube (Director's Cut Ver. 1)

Genkimono de Ikō! (元気者で行こう!, Let's Go Cheerfully!) is the 8th major label single released by Japanese idol Erina Mano, and her 11th overall. The single was released on 15 September 2010 on the Hachama label. The single was released in three different types: Limited Editions A and B, and a normal edition. The limited edition A came with a bonus DVD featuring the "making-of" video of the photography on the CD covers, while the limited edition B sported a different cover. The first press of all three editions came with a serial number card with which to enter a draw for tickets to the single's release event. The Single V was released on 22 September.

== Promotion ==
"Genkimono de Ikō!" was used in multiple commercial advertisements, directed by Yukihiko Tsutsumi, which were featured on the TV Asahi broadcasting network. The song was used to promote Nissin Foods, Hakusui's High Sour, and Luna Luna's women's medical website. These products are also featured in the "Director's Cut" version of the music video. The coupling track, "Uchi e Kaerō", was used as the theme song of Kaidan Shin Mimi Bukuro - Kaiki, a film released on 4 September 2010 in which Mano starred.

== Track listing ==
All tracks are written by Yoshiko Miura and Toshiaki Hatakeyama.

CD
No.	Title	Arranger	Length
1.	"Genkimono de Ikō!" (元気者で行こう!, "Let's Go Cheerfully!")	Eiji Kawai	4:37
2.	"Uchi e Kaerō" (家へ帰ろう, "Going Home")	Takashi Tsuzawa	4:31
3.	"Genkimono de Ikō! (Instrumental)"		4:32
Total length:			13:39

Limited DVD
No.	Title	Length
1.	"Jacket Satsuei Making Eizō" (ジャケット撮影メイキング映像, "Jacket Photos: Making Of")

Single V
No.	Title	Length
1.	"Genkimono de Ikō! (Director's Cut Ver. 1)" (元気者で行こう！(ディレクターズカット VER.1))
2.	"Genkimono de Ikō! PV" (元気者で行こう！（PV）)
3.	"PV Satsuei Making Eizō" (PV撮影メイキング映像, "Shooting the PV: Making Of")

== Music video ==
The music video for the titular song was directed by Yukihiko Tsutsumi. The director's cut version features Mano trying to encourage people through difficult times using a special drink called "Gekimono" ("energetic people"), with the help of "Genkimono man". Much of the video plays out in a comic style, with dialogue appearing in speech bubbles instead of being spoken, punctuated by energetic dance scenes.

== Chart performance ==
The single peaked at #7 on the weekly Oricon singles charts with a reported total of 13,640 copies in its first week, charting for three weeks. It also reached a peak of #23 on the weekly Japanese Billboard "Hot 100", charting for two weeks. The Single V peaked at #90 on Oricon's weekly DVD charts, charting for two weeks.

== Charts ==
Chart (2010)	Peak position
Oricon Weekly Chart	7
Billboard Japan Hot 100	23
