= Mi Da Ra Matenrō =

Single by Melon Kinenbi

from the album The Nimaime
- Released: September 10, 2003
- Genre: J-pop
- Label: Zetima
- Producer(s): Tsunku

Melon Kinenbi singles chronology
"Amai Anata no Aji" (2003)	"Mi Da Ra Matenrō" (2003)	"Kawaii Kare" (2003)

"Mi Da Ra Matenrō" (MI DA RA 摩天楼, Mi Da Ra Skyscraper) is the tenth single by Japanese girl group Melon Kinenbi. It was released on September 10, 2003, and its highest position on the Oricon weekly chart was #15.

== Track listing ==
1. Mi Da Ra Matenrō (MI DA RA 摩天楼, Mi Da Ra Skyscraper)
2. Futari no Paradise (二人のパラダイス, Couple's Paradise)
3. Mi Da Ra Matenrō (Instrumental) (MI DA RA 摩天楼（Instrumental）)
