= Erina Mano =

Japanese singer and actress (born 1991)

Erina Mano 真野恵里菜
- Born: April 11, 1991 (age 35); Zama, Kanagawa, Japan
- Genres: J-Pop
- Occupations: Singer; actress
- Instruments: Vocals; piano
- Years active: 2006–present
- Label: Hachama
- Formerly of: Hello! Project (Hello Pro Egg, Ongaku Gatas, Gatas Brilhantes H.P., Petitmoni V, Hello! Project Mobekimasu)
- Spouse: Gaku Shibasaki (m. 2018)
- Website: just-pro.jp/manoerina

Erina Mano (真野恵里菜, Mano Erina; born April 11, 1991) is a Japanese idol singer and actress formerly associated with Hello! Project. She joined in 2006 as a member of Hello Pro Egg, as a trainee. In 2007, she became a member of the Hello! Project futsal team Gatas Brilhantes H.P. and its musical group Ongaku Gatas. On March 29, 2008, she started a solo music career, working under the management and promotion of J.P Room. She continued with Hello! Project until 2013, and is now performing in solo music projects as well as acting in films and television.

== Life and career ==
=== 2008 ===
Erina Mano joined Hello! Project as a Hello! Pro Egg in 2006 after passing the Up-Front Group "Egg" Audition. In 2007, she was one of the six members of the Hello! Pro Egg to be added to Ongaku Gatas and became a reserve player for the Gatas Brilhantes H.P. club. She graduated from Ongaku Gatas on March 2, 2008 and Hello! Pro Egg on March 29, 2008 to debut as a soloist. On June 29, 2008 she released her debut indie, "Manopiano". She has been featured as the opening act in various of her Senpai's concerts (Natsumi Abe, Morning Musume, Berryz Kobo and Cute), starting in August 2008.

=== 2009 ===
Having received piano lessons since kindergarten, Mano's solo work within Hello! Project prominently features her playing the piano parts of her musical releases and providing the vocal and piano parts of her songs while performing in concerts and at live events. In 2008, Mano released three singles under an independent label.

She has debuted under a major label Hachama with the single "Otome no Inori", released on March 18, 2009. It reached a number three position on the Oricon charts the first day of release and reached number five on the weekly chart. In 2009, Mano was announced as being one of the members of the new version of Pucchi Moni. Mano's songs are usually composed by KAN. Aya Matsuura has told her via a video comment in April 2009 that she "...needs to be the best singer in H!P, and in order to do that, she'll need to be a better singer than Ai Takahashi."

=== 2010 ===
Mano, along with S/mileage and Morning Musume will star in the CS-Fuji TV-TWO dorama Half Esper which will begin broadcasting in January 2010. Mano's role is a half-trained esper that left a secret government esper research organization known as Kokueken, without being able to fully control her supernatural powers. In 2010 as well, the TBS drama Mano Spy will begin, where Mano plays herself, under the fictional premise that she's an undercover agent. She's sent to Japan as a spy for the Queen of the United Kingdom, and ends up passing an idol audition, so she has trouble with her espionage duties. The theme song of the show is "Matsuge no Saki ni Kimi ga Iru" (from Mano's first album). The show will begin streaming on the internet on January 26 and will be broadcast on BS-TBS on February 27.

She also was in a new drama called DEATH GAME PARK.

On July 1, 2010, Mano made her US debut in Los Angeles. Kai-Ki: Tales of Terror from Tokyo, a Japanese horror film in which she starred and had its world premiere at Club Nokia. She also had a short mini concert, a mini Q and A, and an autograph session for the fans who attended the event.

=== 2011 ===
In 2011, Mano's radio show, "Mano-Deli", was replaced by Morning Musume 9th generation member Riho Sayashi's "Riho-Deli" Also in 2011, it was announced that Mano would star in a short film called "Miyuki's Wind Bell".

In 2011 she had her another solo concert named, Mano Erina's Concert Tour 2011〜Hatachi no Otome 801DAYS.

In July she made a public appearance at South Korea to attend the Puchon International Fantastic Film which would film her movie.

=== 2012 ===
On April 18, it was announced that Mano, Maimi Yajima, Airi Suzuki, and Chisato Okai would star in a new stage play, Theatre In The Round. On November 30, it was announced that she would be joining the M-Line fanclub in March 2013.

=== 2013 ===
On February 19, it was announced that Mano would star in TV Tokyo's drama Minna! ESPer Dayo!. On February 23, she released the photobook Mano na no and graduated from Hello! Project. On July 25, it was announced she would star in the drama Nijushi no Hitomi, which was her first prime time drama. On August 18, Mano appeared on the cover of the magazine Nini-Funi. On December 6, her manager announced that she would appear in a new drama, Shark, in January 2014, starring Johnnies Jr.

=== 2014 ===
In June 2014, Mano held her first concert since her graduation from Hello! Project1, titled "Again ~ Live House de Moetsukiyou!~".

== Personal life ==
Mano married footballer Gaku Shibasaki on July 16, 2018. On July 8, 2024, she announced the birth of their first child.

== Activities outside Japan ==
On July 1, 2010, Mano made her first promotional appearance outside Japan at Club Nokia in Los Angeles for her movie debut in Kai-Ki: Tales of Horror. Mano sang two songs before the screening and held a Q&A and autograph session for her fans. In July 2011, she made her second appearance outside Japan in South Korea.

== Discography ==
=== Singles ===
#	Title	Release date
#	Title	Peak ranks
Indies
1	"Mano Piano" (マノピアノ)	June 29, 2008
2	"Lucky Aura" (ラッキーオーラ)	October 5, 2008
3	"LaLaLa-SoSoSo" (ラララ・ソソソ)	December 12, 2008
Major
1	"Otome no Inori" (乙女の祈り; "Girl's Prayer")	March 18, 2009
1	"Otome no Inori" (乙女の祈り; "Girl's Prayer")	Oricon Weekly Singles: #5; Billboard Japan Hot Singles Sales: #17
2	"Hajimete no Keiken" (はじめての経験; "My First Experience")	May 20, 2009
2	"Hajimete no Keiken" (はじめての経験; "My First Experience")	Oricon Weekly Singles: #6; Billboard Japan Hot Singles Sales: #11
3	"Sekai wa Summer Party" (世界はサマー・パーティ; "Worldwide Summer Party")	July 29, 2009
3	"Sekai wa Summer Party" (世界はサマー・パーティ; "Worldwide Summer Party")	Oricon Weekly Singles: #10; Billboard Japan Hot Singles Sales: #37
4	"Kono Mune no Tokimeki o" (この胸のときめきを; "The Beating of This Chest")	September 30, 2009
4	"Kono Mune no Tokimeki o" (この胸のときめきを; "The Beating of This Chest")	Oricon Weekly Singles: #7; Billboard Japan Hot Singles Sales: #31
5	"Love & Peace = Paradise" (Love & Peace = パラダイス)	November 25, 2009
5	"Love & Peace = Paradise" (Love & Peace = パラダイス)	Oricon Weekly Singles: #12; Billboard Japan Hot Singles Sales: #45
6	"Haru no Arashi" (春の嵐; "Spring Storm")	February 24, 2010
6	"Haru no Arashi" (春の嵐; "Spring Storm")	Oricon Weekly Singles: #10; Billboard Japan Hot Singles Sales: #28
7	"Onegai Dakara..." (お願いだから...; "So Please...")	May 12, 2010
7	"Onegai Dakara..." (お願いだから...; "So Please...")	Oricon Weekly Singles: #7; Billboard Japan Hot Singles Sales: #20
8	"Genkimono de Ikō!" (元気者で行こう!; "Let's Go Cheerfully!")	September 15, 2010
8	"Genkimono de Ikō!" (元気者で行こう!; "Let's Go Cheerfully!")	Oricon Weekly Singles: #7; Billboard Japan Hot Singles Sales: #23
9	"Seishun no Serenade" (青春のセレナーデ; "Youth's Serenade")	January 26, 2011
9	"Seishun no Serenade" (青春のセレナーデ; "Youth's Serenade")	Oricon Weekly Singles: #13; Billboard Japan Hot Singles Sales: #45
10	"My Days for You"	June 29, 2011
10	"My Days for You"	Oricon Weekly Singles: #10; Billboard Japan Hot Singles Sales: #35
11	"Doki Doki Baby/Tasogare Kousaten" (ドキドキベイビー／黄昏交差点; "Heart Pounding Baby/Twilight Intersection")"	February 22, 2012
11	"Doki Doki Baby/Tasogare Kousaten" (ドキドキベイビー／黄昏交差点; "Heart Pounding Baby/Twilight Intersection")"	Oricon Weekly Singles: #9; Billboard Japan Hot Singles Sales: #35
12	"Song for the Date" (Song for the DATE)	June 27, 2012
12	"Song for the Date" (Song for the DATE)	Oricon Weekly Singles: #7
13	"Next My Self" (NEXT MY SELF)	December 12, 2012
13	"Next My Self" (NEXT MY SELF)	Oricon Weekly Singles: #8

=== Collaboration singles ===
Artist(s)	Title	Release date
Bekimasu (ベキマス)	"Makeruna Wasshoi!" (負けるな わっしょい！)	August 6, 2011 (digital); December 21, 2011 (CD single)
Hello! Project Mobekimasu (ハロー！プロジェクト モベキマス)	"Busu ni Naranai Tetsugaku" (ブスにならない哲学)	November 16, 2011

=== Albums ===
#	Title	Release date
#	Title	Peak ranks
1	FRIENDS	December 16, 2009
1	FRIENDS	Oricon Weekly Albums: #33
2	MORE FRIENDS	November 24, 2010
2	MORE FRIENDS	Oricon Weekly Albums: #32
3	More Friends Over	March 28, 2012
3	More Friends Over	Oricon Weekly Albums: -

== Filmography ==
=== Television dramas ===
Show	Start date	End date	Station
Pocky 4 Sisters! (ポッキーフォーシスターズ!, Pokkii Fō Shisutaazu)	December 27, 2008		BS-i
Tokyo Shōjo (東京少女; lit. Tokyo Girl)	February 7, 2009	February 28, 2009	BS-i
Koisuru Seiza (恋する星座)	April 6, 2009	June 25, 2009	BS-i
Hanbun Esper (半分エスパー) "Half ESPer"	January, 2010	March 19, 2010	Fuji Television two(CS)
SPEC (ONLY episode#7 as Satori)	October, 2010	December, 2010	TBS
SPEC Special Episode~SHOH(#10)	April 1, 2012		TBS
Minna! ESPer Dayo! (みんな！エスパーだよ！)	April 12, 2013	July 5, 2013	TV Tokyo
Nigeru wa Haji da ga Yaku ni Tatsu (逃げるは恥だが役に立つ)	October 11, 2016	December 20, 2016	TBS
Kono Yo ni Tayasui Shigoto wa Nai (この世にたやすい仕事はない)	April 6, 2017	May 25, 2017	NHK

=== Television shows ===
Show	Start date	End date	Station
Berikyū! (ベリキュー!)	March 31, 2008	October 3, 2009	TV Tokyo
Yorosen! (よろセン!)	October 6, 2008	March 27, 2009	TV Tokyo

=== Films ===
- Kamen Rider × Kamen Rider Fourze & OOO: Movie War Mega Max - Nadeshiko/Kamen Rider Nadeshiko/Nadeshiko Misaki
- Waga Haha no Ki ~ Chronicle of My Mother (2012, as Sadayo the maid)
- Kamen Rider × Kamen Rider Wizard & Fourze: Movie War Ultimatum - Nadeshiko/Kamen Rider Nadeshiko
- The Next Generation -Patlabor- (2014, 2015) as Akira Izumino
- Tag (2015) – Izumi
- Orange (2015)
- Anonymous Noise (2017) as Miou Suguri
- The 100th Love with You (2017)
- Kids on the Slope (2018) as Yurika Fukahori
- Impossibility Defense (2018) as Yū Kimura
- We Are (2018) as Kana
- Bleach (2018) as Orihime Inoue

== Awards ==
Year	Award	Category	Result	Ref.
2010	Japan Gold Disc Awards	Best 5 New Artists	Won	
2017	JLIA Best Leather Wearers Award	Female Category	Won	
