= Ayumi Shibata =

Japanese female singer (born 1984)

- 柴田 あゆみ
- Born: February 22, 1984 (age 42)
- Occupation: Singer
- Musical career
- Genres: J-pop
- Years active: 1999–2016
- Labels: Zetima; Climb Music/Universal D

Ayumi Shibata (柴田 あゆみ, Shibata Ayumi) (born February 22, 1984) is a Japanese female singer. She is a former member of Melon Kinenbi, an all-girl J-pop group which is part of the Hello! Project. She joined the group Tanpopo with Morning Musume members Asami Konno and Risa Niigaki in 2002 until the group went into an indefinite hiatus after releasing one single. Shibata has been an active member of Hello! Project since 2000, participating in Hello! Project's futsal club Gatas Brilhantes H.P., many shuffle groups, concerts, and special events.

After Melon Kinenbi disbanded in 2011, Shibata announced she was starting her own solo career, and she later released her first solo single, "believe", in November 2011. She later released her first solo album in 2014, "Kick start", which was largely a cover album.

In 2016, Shibata announced she was marrying baseball pitcher Masaki Minami, and announced her retirement shortly afterwards as well.

== Photobooks ==
=== Solo ===
- Ayumi
- Ayumi 2 (September 30, 2003, photographer Chukyo Ozawa)

=== Group ===
- Melon Kinenbi Photo Album – Taiyō to Kajitsu
- Melon Kinenbi in Hello! Project 2004 Summer
- Hello! Project Town! Hello! Project 2005 Summer

== Discography ==
#	Title	Release date
1	Kick start	2014-02-19
