= Arisa Noto =

- 能登 有沙
- Born: December 26, 1988 (age 37); Chiba Prefecture, Japan
- Occupations: Singer; actress; voice actress; choreographer
- Years active: 2004–present
- Agent: L&L Victor Entertainment
- Musical career
- Genres: J-pop; anime song
- Instrument: Vocals
- Label: Zetima (2004-2009)
- Member of: StylipS
- Formerly of: Ongaku Gatas; Hello Pro Egg; Hello! Project

Arisa Noto (能登 有沙, Noto Arisa; born December 26, 1988) is a Japanese singer, actress, voice actress and choreographer. She is a member of StylipS, a former member of Ongaku Gatas and was part of Hello! Project.

== Career ==
Noto joined Hello! Project in June 2004 and became part of the group's trainee program, Hello Pro Egg. During this time, she participated as a member of Ongaku Gatas. She graduated from the company on September 23, 2009.

== Filmography ==
=== Television animation ===
2010

- Kaitō Reinya, Policewoman Notti

2012

- La storia della Arcana Famiglia, Woman 1 (ep 7)
- Nakaimo - My Sister Is Among Them!, Maiko Kotori
- Saki Achiga-hen episode of Side-A, Sera Eguchi
- High School DxD, Issei's alarm clock, Nii (ep 11)

2013

- Shirokuma Cafe, Porcupine fan club
- The Severing Crime Edge, Nigi Ubuzato

2014

- The Comic Artist and Assistants, Mihari Otosuna
- Locodol (ep 3)

=== OVA ===
- Sankarea: Undying Love (2012), Onozawa
- Nakaimo - My Sister Is Among Them! (2013), Maiko Kotori
- The Comic Artist and Assistants (2014), Mihari Otosuna

=== ONA ===
- Kyō no Asuka Show (2012), Asuka Kyōno

=== Movies ===
- Light Novel no Tanoshii Kakikata (2010), Kokona Atae

=== Video games ===
- Sorcery Saga: Curse of the Great Curry God (2013), Cliora
- Makai Shin Trillion (2015), Lilith
- Fairy Fencer F (2013), Cui
- Fairy Fencer F: Advent Dark Force (2015), Cui
- Fairy Fencer F: Refrain Chord (2022), Cui

== Songs ==
- "Blue Moon Dream"
