= Namida no Taiyō =

Single by Melon Kinenbi

from the album The Nimaime
- Released: June 9, 2004
- Genre: J-pop
- Label: Zetima
- Producer(s): Tsunku

Melon Kinenbi singles chronology
"Kawaii Kare" (2003)	"Namida no Taiyō" (2004)	"Champagne no Koi" (2004)

"Namida no Taiyō" (涙の太陽, Sun of Tears) is the twelfth single by Japanese girl group Melon Kinenbi. It was released on June 9, 2004, and its highest position on the Oricon weekly chart was #15. It is a cover of "Namida no Taiyō (Crying in a Storm)" by Emy Jackson, originally released on April 20, 1965.

The song was also covered in 1973 by idol Maria Anzai, whose version went on to sell over 500,000 copies.

== Track listing ==
1. Namida no Taiyō (涙の太陽, Sun of Tears)
2. Saa, Sassoku Moriagete Ikoka!! (さあ、早速盛り上げて 行こか〜!!, Now, Right Now, Let's Go~!!)
