= 1st Anniversary =

Studio album by Melon Kinenbi
- Released: March 12, 2003
- Genre: J-pop
- Label: zetima
- Producer: Tsunku

Melon Kinenbi chronology
1st Anniversary (2003)	THE Nimaime (2004)

1st Anniversary is the debut album by J-pop group Melon Kinenbi, containing their first eight singles, all released within their first year of operation. It was released on March 12, 2003. Its highest ranking on the Oricon weekly chart was #11.

== Release ==
The track "This Is Unmei" sold over 12,740 copies and reached #28 on the Oricon weekly chart. It was used as the ending theme for TV Tokyo's show Mr. Marick's Magic Time. It was released on October 11, 2001, and its highest position on the Oricon weekly chart was #28. Kōsui" (香水, Perfume) reached its highest position on the Oricon weekly chart was #12.

Akai Freesia" (赤いフリージア, Red Freesia) reached its highest position on the Oricon weekly chart was #10. This made it Melon Kinenbi's first single to rank within the top 10. It was used as an audition song for the sixth generation of Morning Musume, the main "super-group" in Hello! Project.

Denwa Matteimasu" (電話待っています, Call Waiting) reached its highest position on the Oricon weekly chart at number 53.

== Track listing ==
1. "Melon Kinenbi no Theme (OP)" (メロン記念日のテーマ(OP), Melon Kinenbi's Theme (Opening))
2. "Akai Freesia" (赤いフリージア, Red Freesia)
3. "Kōsui" (香水, Perfume)
4. "Anniversary"
5. "This Is Unmei" (This is 運命, This is Fate)
6. "Kokuhaku Kinenbi" (告白記念日, Confession Day)
7. "Nemuranai Yoru" (眠らない夜, Sleepless Night)
8. "Saa! Koibito ni Narō" (さぁ!恋人になろう)
9. "Denwa Matteimasu" (電話待っています, Call Waiting)
10. "Natsu no Yoru wa Danger!" (夏の夜はデインジャー!, Dangerous Summer Night!)
11. "Amai Anata no Aji" (甘いあなたの味, Your Sweet Taste)
12. "Endless Youth"
13. "Melon Kinenbi no Theme (ED)" (メロン記念日のテーマ(ED), Melon Kinenbi's Theme (Ending))
