= Ayano Sato (singer) =

Ayano Sato 佐藤 綾乃
- Also known as: Ayanon
- Born: 7 January 1995 (age 30); Kanagawa Prefecture, Japan
- Genres: J-pop
- Occupation: Singer
- Years active: 2009-2017
- Website: Up Up Girls (Kakko Kari) Official Site

Ayano Sato (佐藤 綾乃, Satō Ayano, born 7 January 1995, in Kanagawa Prefecture) is a former Japanese idol who is a former member of the female idol group Up Up Girls (Kakko Kari) and the K-pop cover dance group UFZS.

Sato's official nickname is Ayanon (あやのん). She was represented with Up-Front Create.

== Works ==
=== Videos ===
Year	Title	Ref.
2009	2009 Hello! Project Shinjin Kōen 6 Tsuki –Nakano Step!–	
2010	Gekijō-ban Hontō ni atta Kowai Hanashi 3D	
2011	Cutie Musical Akuma no Tsubuyaki –Akuma de Cute na Seishun Graffiti–	
2013	Ada	

== Filmography ==
=== Concerts ===
Year	Title	Ref.
2009	2009 Hello! Project Shinjin Kōen 4 Tsuki –Yokohama Hop!–	
2009	2009 Hello! Project Shinjin Kōen 6 Tsuki –Nakano Step!–	
2009	2009 Hello! Project Shinjin Kōen 9 Tsuki –Yokohama Jump!–	
2009	2009 Hello! Project Shinjin Kōen 11 Tsuki –Yokohama Fire!–	
2010	2010 Hello! Project Shinjin Kōen 3 Tsuki –Yokohama Gold!–	
2010	2010 Hello! Project Shinjin Kōen 6 Tsuki –Yokohama Hop!–	
2010	2010 Hello! Project Shinjin Kōen 9 Tsuki –Yokohama Step!–	
2010	2010 Hello! Project Shinjin Kōen 11 Tsuki –Yokohama Jump!–	

=== Events ===
Year	Title	Ref.
2009	Hello Pro Egg Delivery Station in Natsu Sacas'09 Sacas Water Park	

=== Stage musicals ===
Year	Title	Role	Ref.
2009	2009-Nen Shūki Eggu Kenshū Happyōkai –Joyū Sengen–		
2010	2010-Nen Shūki Eggu Kenshū Happyōkai –Joyū Sengen–		
2010	Cutie Musical Akuma no tsubuyaki –Akuma de Cute na Seishun Grifiti–	Ami	

=== Films ===
Year	Title	Role	Ref.
2010	Gekijō-ban Hontō ni atta Kowai Hanashi 3D		
2013	Ada	Yuko Watanabe	

=== Television ===
Year	Title	Network	Ref.
2010	Pinkss	SATV	

=== TV dramas ===
Year	Title	Role	Network	Ref.
2011	Yūsha Yoshihiko		TV Tokyo	
2013	Real Onigokko The Origin	Ayano Sato	Tokyo Metropolitan Area Triangle	

=== Internet videos ===
Year	Title	Website	Ref.
2011	To be	Fuji TV	

=== Advertisements ===
Year	Title	Ref.
2012	Keio Amusement Passport	
2013	Keio Amusement Passport	
