= Amai Anata no Aji =

2000 single by Melon Kinenbi

Single by Melon Kinenbi

from the album 1st Anniversary
- Released: February 19, 2000
- Genre: J-pop
- Label: Zetima
- Songwriter(s): Tsunku
- Producer(s): Tsunku

Melon Kinenbi singles chronology
"Amai Anata no Aji" (2000)	"Kokuhaku Kinenbi" (2000)

"Amai Anata no Aji" (甘いあなたの味, Your Sweet Taste) is the debut single of Japanese girl group Melon Kinenbi. It was used as the ending theme of the TBS show "Majutsu-shi Ōfen Revenge". Its highest position on the Oricon weekly chart was #60.

== Track listings ==
=== CD ===
1. Amai Anata no Aji (甘いあなたの味, Your Sweet Taste)
2. Skip! (スキップ!)
3. Amai Anata no Aji (Instrumental) (甘いあなたの味(Instrumental))
