= Hitomi Saito =

- 斉藤 瞳
- Born: October 31, 1981 (age 44)
- Other name: Boss
- Occupation: Singer
- Spouse: Jiro Hachimitsu (m. 2010; div. 2011)
- Musical career
- Genres: J-pop
- Years active: 1999–2010, 2011–present
- Label: Zetima

Hitomi Saito (斉藤瞳, Saitō Hitomi), born October 31, 1981, in Niigata, Japan, is a former singer and current radio personality. She was the leader of Melon Kinenbi, an all-girl J-pop group formerly within Hello! Project, until its disbandment in 2010. She is also a former member of Hello! Project's futsal club, Gatas Brilhantes H.P.

== History ==
In August 2010, less than three months after Melon Kinenbi's disbandment, Saito married comedian Jirō Hachimitsu (born Jirō Takano) of duo "Tokyo Dynamite".

On October 15, 2011, it was announced that Hitomi and Tokyo Dynamite's Hachimitsu Jiro have divorced.

After disappearing temporarily from the public eye after Melon Kinenbi's disbandment, Saito returned as a radio personality on FM-Niigata, which she currently remains active as.

== Appearances ==
=== Photobooks ===
#	Title	Release date	Publisher	ISBN
1	Hitomi Saito (斉藤瞳写真集「斉藤瞳」)	2003-08-07	Wani Books	ISBN 4-8470-2770-1

=== TV shows ===
Show	Start date	End date
Sexy Onna Juku (セクシー女塾)	2003-03-31	2003-09-27
Majokko Rika-chan no Magical v-u-den (魔女っ娘。梨華ちゃんのマジカル美勇伝)	2004-11-16	2004-11-22
Musume Dokyu! (娘DOKYU!)	2005-08-18	Still running

=== Radio ===
Program	Start date	End date
TBC Fun Field Mōretsu Mōdasshu (TBC FUNふぃーるど・モーレツモーダッシュ)	2005-09-12	Still running
