= Up Up Girls Kakko Kari =

Japanese female idol group

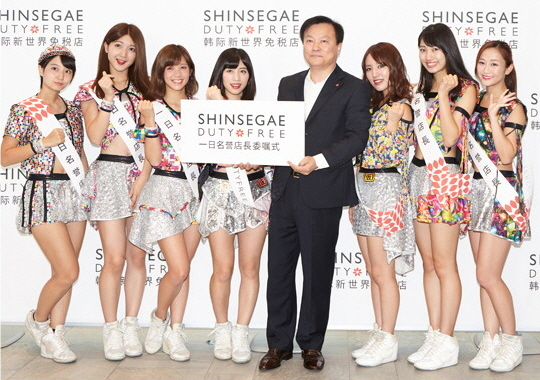

Background information
- Also known as: UFZS
- Origin: Tokyo. Japan
- Genres: J-pop, pop
- Years active: 2011–present
- Labels: Up-Front Works (indie label) (2012); T-Palette Records (2012–)
- Members: Yume Aoyagi; MINA; MARIN
- Past members: Minami Sengoku; Ayano Satō; Konatsu Furukawa; Saki Mori; Akari Saho; Manami Arai; Sumire Kudo; Ayu Suzuki; Azusa Sekine; Yurika Furuya; Meina Suzuki; Seina Koyama; Haruka Sumida
- Website: www.upupgirlskakkokari.com

Up Up Girls kakko Kari (アップアップガールズ（仮）, Appu Appu Gāruzu Kakko Kari; "Up Up Girls (Subject to Change)", stylized in English as UP UP GIRLS kakko KARI) is a Japanese female idol group. The group was formerly named Up-Front Girls kakko Kari (アップフロントガールズ（仮）, Appu Furonto Gāruzu Kakko Kari; "Up-Front Girls (Subject to Change)"). The name of the group is abbreviated Apuga (アプガ) or Appu Appu (アップアップ).

== History ==
=== 2004 to 2011 ===
In 2004, Hello! Project held a nationwide audition titled "Hello Pro Egg Audition 2004". Out of over 10,000 applicants, 31 girls were successful. Six out of the seven members were originally part of the "egg" generation, while Sato Ayano joined the trainee group in 2009. During the last egg concert of 2010, Hello! Project announced a change in their trainee group. As part of this change, many older members completed their training, but were not added to the major groups within Hello! Project. Saho Akari was the last to complete her training. Up Up Girls originally consisted of six girls, later growing to seven with the addition of Saho Akari. Their first event was held on May 1, 2011.

=== 2012 to 2015 ===
From their formation to late 2012 all of their releases were under Up-Front Works, after which they were signed by T-Palette Records. Their first seven singles and first album were released by Up-Front Works. They were transferred to Up-Front Create. The group was jointly managed by YU-M Entertainment and Up-Front Group. During 2015, Up-Front Group created a partnership with YU-M, a new agency. YU-M is their primary management while Up-Front Create is a producer of their releases.

=== 2016 to 2017 ===
Under YU-M, the group reached their dream of performing at Nippon Budokan. The company was able to afford the rental cost, but "ran out" of money for outfits and decorations. This resulted in the crowdfunding of over 12,000,000 JYP. The crowdfunding was successful, but they did not reach their goal of selling out the venue and only filled a little over 4000 of Budokan's 14,000+ capacity.

At this Budokan concert, they announced their search for girls who would become either a sister group, rival group, or full members. The auditions began on November 8, 2016. In February the four successful applicants from the audition were announced. With a late addition to the group, these five girls formed Up Up Girls (2), pronounced Kakko Niki. They are a sister group to Up Up Girls (Kakko Kari). From May 29 to June 19, 2017, auditions for Up Up Girls (Pro-Wrestler) were held. From these auditions, four successful applicants formed the newest addition to the Up Up Girls lineup.

=== 2017 ===
On April 28, Sengoku Minami and Sato Ayano announced their graduation from Up Up Girls (Kari). Sengoku moved on to acting while Sato retired from the entertainment industry. After the graduation of Sengoku Minami and Sato Ayano on September 15, 2017, the group decreased to five members. No additional members were added to their lineup and no announcements were made as to whether or not Kakko Niki or Pro-Wrestler members would join the flagship group. After a short break, Up Up Girls (Kari) returned to the stage in November 2017 as a five-member group.

=== 2020 ===
On September 26, the group held the "Up Up Girls (Kakko Kari) ENDLESS SUMMER in HIBIYA YAON" live concert, which was streamed through the Japanese website Niconico. The crowdfunding for the concert had opened on September 1, with 100% of the 8 million yen target amount being raised within just over three weeks. They raised over 12 million yen total for the concert. During the concert, it was announced that the group would go through a 'major system change', with new member auditions starting.

On October 26, members Konatsu Furukawa, Saki Mori, Akari Saho and Manami Arai all announced their graduations from the group, which would leave Azusa Sekine as the only remaining original member. The group would hold a final event with their five member lineup called "Up Up Girls (Kakko Kari) FIVE SOUL FOREVER" on December 17 at Zepp Tokyo, with an additional farewell party. It was also added that Mori Saki would be the only member retiring from the entertainment industry.

On November 10, they released their final album as five titled "6th Album (Kakko Kari)".

On December 17, they held the aforementioned Up Up Girls (Kakko Kari) FIVE SOUL FOREVER concert, marking it as Furukawa, Mori, Saho and Arai's final live concert with the group. At the concert, it was revealed that seven members had passed the audition. These members were Yurika Furuya, Meina Suzuki, Sumire Kudo, Ayu Suzuki, Seina Koyama, Yume Aoyagi and Haruka Sumida. Along with these new members, Sekine announced that she would change her member color from orange to red.

On December 31, Furukawa, Mori, Saho and Arai officially ended activities and graduated from the group.

=== 2021 ===
On July 27, they released new single titled "Ippome no YES! / Sensen Brand New World!".

=== 2022 ===
On January 25, they released first mini album titled "Apuga Yabai".

=== 2023 ===
On March 18, Sumire Kudo and Ayu Suzuki graduated from the group.

== Members ==
=== As of 2024 ===
- Azusa Sekine (関根梓)
- Yurika Furuya (古谷柚里花)
- Meina Suzuki (鈴木芽生菜)
- Seina Koyama (小山星流)
- Yume Aoyagi (青柳佑芽)
- Haruka Sumida (住田悠華)

=== Former ===
- Minami Sengoku (仙石みなみ)
- Ayano Satō (佐藤綾乃)
- Konatsu Furukawa (古川小夏)
- Saki Mori (森咲樹)
- Akari Saho (佐保明梨)
- Manami Arai (新井愛瞳)
- Sumire Kudo (工藤菫)
- Ayu Suzuki (鈴木あゆ)

== Discography ==
=== Singles ===
No.	Title	Release date	Oricon Weekly Singles Chart
Up-Front Works
1	"Going My Way" (Going my ↑)	April 25, 2012	—
2	"Barebare I Love You" (バレバレI LOVE YOU)	June 27, 2012	—
3	"Uppercut! / Yūdachi! Through the Rainbow" (アッパーカット!/夕立ち!スルー・ザ・レインボー)	July 25, 2012	64
4	"Mecha Kyun Summer" (メチャキュン♡サマー( ´ ▽ ` )ノ)	August 29, 2012	184
5	"Namen na! Ashi Girls / Marvel Hero" (なめんな!アシガールズ/マーブルヒーロー)	September 26, 2012	135
6	"End of the Season"	October 3, 2012	146
7	"Upper Rock / Ichiban Girls!" (UPPER ROCK/イチバンガールズ!)	November 7, 2012	150
T-Palette Records
8	"Chopper Chopper / Survival Girls" (チョッパー☆チョッパー／サバイバルガールズ)	December 5, 2012	35
9	"Respectokyo / Sutorera! (Straight Up!)" (リスペクトーキョー/ストレラ!～Straight Up!～)	February 20, 2013	81
10	"Sakura Drive / Dateline" (SAKURADRIVE/Dateline)	March 13, 2013	39
11	"Next Stage / Ano Saka no Ue made," (Next Stage/あの坂の上まで、)	April 10, 2013	30
12	"Ginga Jōjō Monogatari / Burn the Fire!! / Natural Born Idol" (銀河上々物語／Burn the fire!!／ナチュラルボーン・アイドル)	June 5, 2013	25
13	"Summer Beam!/Up Up Typhoon" (サマービーム!/アップアップタイフーン)	July 24, 2013	42
14	"SAMURAI GIRLS/Widol Seven" (SAMURAI GIRLS / ワイドルセブン)	September 4, 2013	47
15	"Starry Night/Seishun Build Up" (Starry Night / 青春ビルドアップ)	October 30, 2013	42
16	"Nijiiro Mosaic / ENJOY!! ENJO(Y)!!" (虹色モザイク／ENJOY!! ENJO(Y)!!)	December 25, 2013	26
17	"(Kari) wa Kaesuze ☆ be your soul / Party! Party! / Jumper!" ((仮)は返すぜ☆be your soul / Party! Party! / ジャンパー！)	April 9, 2014	17
18	"Zenryoku! Pump Up!! / Kono Melody wo Kimi to" (全力! Pump UP!! / このメロディを君と)	July 1, 2014	22
19	Beautiful Dreamer / Zenryouku! Pump Up!! -ULTRA MIX- (全力!Pump Up!!-ULTRA Mix-) / Itadaki wo Mezase! (イタダキを目指せ！)	November 4, 2014	7
20	Party People Alien / Seven☆Peace (パーリーピーポーエイリアン/セブン☆ピース)	April 5, 2016	5
21	!!!!!!!!(Ban Ban Ban) / Kimi to Iu Kasetsu / Future & Past / YOLO / Ran Ran Ran / Abyssal Drop	October 11, 2016	
22	Upper Disco / Forever Young / Show Time / Flash	May 9, 2017	
23	Joujou Dokonjou / Be A Girl / Ichiban Girls! 2017 / Start Line (Group Version)	November 28, 2017	
24	Da Dan Dance! / Heat Beat Island / 5 to the 5th Power	June 25, 2019	20
25	It's Up to You / Happy Naked!! / Big Bang	December 10, 2019	21
26	Sekai de Ichiban Kawaii Idol / Shiterumon	January 7, 2020	8
27	Ippome no YES! / Sensen Brand New World!	July 27, 2021	

=== Albums ===
No.	Title	Release date	Oricon Weekly Albums Chart
Up-Front Works
1	First Album (Kakko Kari) (ファーストアルバム(仮), Fāsuto Arubamu kakko kari)	January 30, 2013	63
T-Palette Records
2	Second Album (Kakko Kari) (セカンドアルバム(仮), Sekando Arubamu kakko kari)	February 19, 2014	28
3	Third Album (Kakko Kari) (サードアルバム(仮), Sādo Arubamu kakko kari)	March 17, 2015	39
4	Fourth Album (Kakko Kari); 4thアルバム(仮) ( 4th Arubamu kakko kari)	August 29, 2017	23
5	Aoharu 1st (アオハル 1st)	November 12, 2019	24

=== DVDs ===
No.	Title	Release date	Oricon Weekly DVD Chart
Up-Front Works
4	Up Up Girls (Kakko Kari) 1st Live Daikan'yama Kessen (Kakko Kari) (アップアップガールズ（仮）1st LIVE 代官山決戦（仮）, Appu Appu Gāruzu kakko kari Fāsuto Raibu Daikan'yama Kessen kakko kari)	November 23, 2012; December 12, 2012	173
T-Palette Records
5	Up Up Girls (Kakko Kari) 2nd Live Roppongi Kessen (Kakko Kari) (アップアップガールズ（仮） 2nd LIVE 六本木決戦（仮）, Appu Appu Gāruzu kakko kari Sekando Raibu Roppongi Kessen kakko kari)	April 3, 2013	
