= Sharam Q =

Japanese rock band

- Also known as: Sharan Q
- Genres: Pop rock; power pop; glam rock
- Years active: 1988–2000, 2006–2015
- Labels: BMG Fun House (1992–2000); Zetima (2006–present)
- Members: Tsunku; Hatake; Makoto; Taisei
- Past members: Shū
- Website: Sharam Q's official website

Sharam Q (Japanese: シャ乱Q, Hepburn: Sharan Kyū) was a Japanese rock band composed of lead singer Tsunku (つんく), Hatake (はたけ) on guitar, Makoto (まこと) on drums and Taisei (たいせい; たいせー prior to 2006) on keyboards.

== Biography ==
They debuted with "18kagetsu" (18ヶ月, 18 months) in 1992. They were not an instant hit initially, but their fourth single "Jōkyō Monogatari" (上・京・物・語, Tale of Going to the Capital) broke the top 50 of the Oricon charts. Eventually, the single "Single Bed" (シングル ベッド) got a lot of attention since it was used in the DNA^2 anime series, breaking into the top 10. The next single "Zurui Onna" (ズルい女), also broke into the top 10. "Zurui Onna" is the 84th best-selling single in Japan of all time. Their 11th single, "Namida no Kage" (涙の影, Shadow of Tears), topped the charts in 1996.

In 1997, the band held an audition on the evening show ASAYAN to find a new female vocalist. While the audition eventually yielded winner Michiyo Heike, the competition would be the impetus for the formation of Morning Musume. Runners-up Yuko Nakazawa, Natsumi Abe, Kaori Iida, Aya Ishiguro, and Asuka Fukuda took up Tsunku's offer after the competition to form a group he would personally produce if they could sell 50,000 copies of their debut independent single Ai no Tane in five days. The mission was accomplished in four.

After the 2000 release of "Shin Ramen Daisuki Koike-san no Uta" (新 ラーメン大好き小池さんの唄, New Song of Koike who likes Ramen), the band went on hiatus. During this period, Tsunku focused on establishing Morning Musume's career and the formation of Hello! Project stable. Makoto would frequently act as an emcee during these concerts.

During the end of 2006 and early 2007, Hakate, Makoto, and Taisei would frequently appear on the short music show Uta Doki! to play their respective instruments in support of the guest vocalist.

Sharam Q became active again in 2006, having released a new single entitled Aruiteru (歩いてる, Walking Along) in November 2006. Tsunku originally wrote and composed the song for Morning Musume, who debuted their recording two weeks before Sharam Q's rendition.

In March 2014, Tsunku announced on his blog that he had laryngeal cancer, which he found out after having throat surgery due to an unspecified condition. On April 4, 2015, Tsunku revealed that he had his vocal cords removed as part of his cancer treatment, whereupon Sharam Q's activities ceased.

== Discography ==
=== Singles ===
#	Title	Release date	Oricon Ranking
1	Jū Ha18 ka Getsu (18ヶ月, 18 Months)	1992.07.22	Did not chart
2	Tottemo Merry-Go-Round (とってもメリーゴーランド, Really Merry-Go-Round)	1993.02.24	Did not chart
3	Tomodachi wa Imasu ka (友達はいますか, Do You Have a Friend?)	1993.05.08	Did not chart
4	Jōkyō Monogatari (上・京・物・語, Tale of Going to the Capital)	1994.01.21	47
5	Koi o Suru Dake Muda Nante (恋をするだけ無駄なんて, Why Is Only Being in Love Pointless)	1994.07.27	28
6	Single Bed (シングル・ベッド, Shinguru Beddo)	1994.10.21	9 *First million seller single
7	Zurui Onna (ズルい女, Cunning Woman)	1995.05.03	2 *Second million seller single
8	Sora o Mina yo (空を見なよ)	1995.08.23	3
9	My Babe Kimi ga Nemuru Made (My Babe 君が眠るまで, My Babe Until You Sleep)	1995.10.21	3
10	Iiwake (いいわけ, Excuse)	1996.04.24	3
11	Namida no Kage (涙の影, Shadow of Tears)	1996.07.24	1 *First single to reach #1
12	Nice Boy!	1996.11.14	4
13	Sonna Mon Darō (そんなもんだろう, It's Like That)	1997.04.16	3
14	Power Song (パワーソング, Pawā Songu)	1997.08.21	10
15	Tokai no Melody (都会のメロディー, City Melody)	1998.02.18	7
16	Tameiki (ためいき, Sign)	1998.05.13	13
17	Ai Just On My Love (愛 Just on my Love)	1998.10.07	10
18	Kimi wa Majutsushi? (君は魔術士?, Are You a Witch?)	1999.02.17	24
19	Shin Rāmen Daisuki Koike-san no Uta (新・ラーメン大好き小池さんの唄, (New) Koike Likes Ramen Song)	2000.03.23	23
20	Aruiteru (歩いてる, Walking Along)	2006.11.29	23

=== Albums ===
#	Title	Release date	Oricon Ranking
1	Sakuretsu! Henachoco Punch (炸裂!へなちょこパンチ, Explosion! Novice Punch)	1992.09.23	Did not chart
2	Urekko e no Michi Jūtaichū (売れっ子への道 渋滞中, The Road to My Favourite Kid (Congested))	1993.03.24	Did not chart
3	Lost Time (ロスタイム, Rosuto Taimu)	1994.02.23	39
4	Rettōkan (劣等感, Inferiority Complex)	1994.11.02	25
5	Gambler (勝負師, Gyanburā)	1995.11.22	2
6	Single Best 10 ★Omaketsuki★ (シングルベスト10★おまけつき★, Single Best 10 (With More))	1996.06.29	2
7	Golden Q	1996.12.18	1
8	Kodoku (孤独, Loneliness)	1998.03.25	6
9	Best Album Omaketsuki '96-'99 (ベストアルバム おまけつき '96～'99)	1999.03.25	10
10	Best of History	2001.04.04	17

== Filmography ==
- Sharam Q no Enka no Hanamichi (1997)
