= Ciao Bella Cinquetti =

Japanese idol group

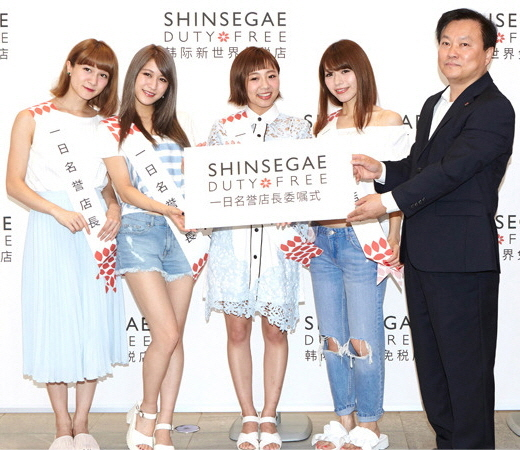
- Ciao Bella Cinquetti in 2016

Background information
- Also known as: The Possible (2006–2015)
- Origin: Tokyo, Japan
- Genre: J-pop
- Years active: 2006–2018
- Labels: Good Factory Record (2006–2008); TN-mix (2008–2012); Pony Canyon (2008–2012); Victor Entertainment (2012–2015); Piccolo Town (2015–2018)
- Spinoffs: Team Makenki
- Spinoff of: Nice Girl Project!; Hello Pro Egg; Hello! Project
- Past members: Kaede Ōse (2006–2009); Yurika Akiyama (2006–2015); Kanami Morozuka (2006–2018); Aina Hashimoto (2006–2018); Robin Shoko Okada (2006–2018); Yuki Goto (2006–2018)
- Website: web.archive.org/web/20190807130731/http://ciao-bella-cinquetti.com/

Ciao Bella Cinquetti (チャオ ベッラ チンクエッティ, Chao Berra Chinkuetti), known until 2015 as The Possible (THE ポッシボー, The Posshibō), was a Japanese idol group formed on August 2, 2006, with six trainees from Hello! Project's Hello Pro Egg. After releasing several indie singles, they graduated from trainee status on October 7, 2007, and debuted as part of Tsunku's Nice Girl Project!. In 2014, they formed the supergroup Team Makenki alongside You Kikkawa and Up Up Girls (Kakko Kari).

Following the conclusion of Nice Girl Project! in 2015, the group transferred to Up-Front Works and adopted the name "Ciao Bella Cinquetti" upon the release of their July 2015 single. The group disbanded on August 2, 2018, on their 12th anniversary.

== History ==
=== 2006-2008: Indies era ===
The Possible was announced as a three-member trainee unit on August 2, 2006, during the stage play Cry For Help at the Tsunku Town Theater, consisting of Hello Pro Egg members Kanami Morozuka, Aina Hashimoto, and Yurika Akiyama. Kaede Ōse was added in September 2006, after what Robin Shoko Okada and Yuki Goto came to the group on October 1, 2006. While performing as backup dancers for Hello! Project concerts, The Possible released their first indies single, "Young Days!", on October 22, 2006, followed by with "Hatsukoi no Kakera" on December 10.

In March 14, 2007, their debut studio album, 1 Be Possible!, was released. In October 7, 2007, The Possible graduated from Hello Pro Egg and debuted under Tsunku's newly launched Nice Girl Project!.

On October 15, 2007, the digital magazine FlexComix Blood began publishing the manga The Possible ~Robin to Mahou no Apron~ (THE ポッシボー 〜ロビンと魔法のエプロン〜), written by Motoichi Adachi and illustrated by Yu Nonaka., the main character of which was Robin Shoko Okada. The group's seventh indie single "Happy 15" was used as the official soundtrack for this promotional campaign. During the same period, the composition Koi no Rung Rung Paradise (恋のRung Rung パラダイス) was used as the official soundtrack of the rhythm game Rhythm Tengoku Gold (internationally released as Rhythm Heaven) for the Nintendo DS (2008).

=== 2008-2014: Major label debut, Nice Girl Project! ===
After their first solo concert at Yokohama BLITZ on March 30, 2008, the group made their major-label debut on April 30, 2008, with the single "Kazoku e no Tegami" under TN-mix (distributed by Pony Canyon), which reached number 10 on the Oricon Singles Chart. Outside of music, members of The Possible and sister unit Canary Club debuted in traditional rakugo storytelling at the Shinjuku Suehirotei theater in November 2008, and in April 2009 Yurika Akiyama began hosting the SKY PerfecTV! television program THE Possible Akkyan no Heya.

Kaede Ōse announced in her blog on June 6, 2009, that she would be leaving The Possible and Nice Girl Project! on August 22 to focus on her studies. She withdrew from activities on June 15. Later in 2009, the group participated in Tsunku's anime tie-in unit MM Gakuen Gasshōbu for Gokujō!! Mecha Mote Iinchō, with Okada also making her voice acting debut in the series. In October 2010 and March 2011, Aina Hashimoto and Yurika Akiyama starred in the stage play adaptation of Fushigi Yūgi, performing the theme song "Moshi Kimi ga Negau Nara".

In 2011, they recorded the song I Love You Watashi no Kimi (I love you 私の君), which was featured as the official soundtrack for the Wii video game Minna no Rhythm Tengoku (featured in the 8th remix). The song was later included on the EP Roku-nenme Start! (6年目スタート!). After a long period of low sales and Canary Club hiatus in May 2011, flyers were handed out at concerts in October 2011. These flyers asked if The Possible would exist for only six more months. The members responded by taking over self-production of their live shows (planning setlists, costumes, and MC segments themselves), releasing venue-limited live singles, and building their audience through social media.

In August 2012, The Possible moved to Victor Entertainment, working together with music producer Ryo Honjo. On April 4, 2013, Robin Shoko Okada announced on her blog that she had been named leader of The Possible. Soon after that, their single "Zenryoku Banzai! My Glory!" (released on April 10, 2013) reached number 7 on the Oricon music chart. On December 18, 2013, the group recorded the song Nfuutto Merry Christmas! (んふっとメリークリスマス！) for the music collection Nameko no CD 2. This album was based on the mobile game series Mushroom Garden.

In January 2014, the group held a fan-voting campaign online and at their Shinjuku BLAZE concert to choose their next single from six candidate songs; "Yūki Super Ball!" won the vote and was released across six editions with the remaining candidate tracks as B-sides. In May 2014, their song "Yūki Super Ball!" reached number one on the NACK5 radio show ~IDOL SHOWCASE~ i-BAN!! for ten weeks in total. It was their second song to do this, after Otome! Be Ambitious!. Their third studio album, 1116, followed on September 3, 2014, in regular and limited editions. Later that year, on November 16, they finally played their own solo concert at Nakano Sunplaza, a venue they had dreamed of headlining for years.

=== 2015-2018: Label change and disbandment ===
In 2015, Nice Girl Project! ended its activities ended and The Possible were transferred to Up-Front Works (Piccolo Town), changing their name to "Ciao Bella Cinquetti" on July 8, 2015, at a ceremony featuring a guest appearance by Ibaraki mascot Nebaru-kun. Their debut single under the new name, "Omotesandou/Futakotamagawa/Never Never Give Up" (with "Omotesandou" being a Japanese cover of Joe Dassin's "Les Champs-Élysées" with lyrics adapted by KAN). On August 10, Yurika Akiyama left the group.

For their 10th anniversary in August 2016, the group held a concert at Shinjuku BLAZE on August 2, 2016 (featuring an opening voiceover by Koichi Yamadera and a guest appearance by Unicorn guitarist Isamu Teshima), released a memorial mook and their fourth studio album, Alive 4U!!!! with two editions ("Robiyuki Edition" and "TWINS Edition") featuring different track orders and bonus In September 2016, the group went to South Korea to perform at the Japan-Korea Idol Summit in Seoul. They shared the stage with Up Up Girls (Kakko Kari), Rainbow, and April. During the trip, they also took part in a promotional event for Shinsegae Duty Free. On December 20, 2017, the group released their first and final digital single, "Nandomo Nandomo...".

After a second solo concert at Nakano Sunplaza on January 9, 2018, Ciao Bella Cinquetti released a statement on April 24, 2018, mentioning that they were disbanding in August. They performed at Team Makenki's final concert in July and held their final concert on August 2 with Ōse and Akiyama appearing as special guests.

== Members ==
Name	Member color	Years active	Notes
Kanami Morozuka (諸塚香奈実)	Blue	2006-2018	Original member
Aina Hashimoto (橋本愛奈)	Red (formerly Orange)	2006-2018	Original member; sub-leader
Robin Shoko Okada (岡田ロビン翔子)	Pink	2006-2018	Added October 2006; leader (2013-2018)
Yuki Goto (後藤夕貴)	Yellow	2006-2018	Added October 2006
Yurika Akiyama (秋山ゆりか)	Purple	2006-2015	Original member; graduated August 10, 2015
Kaede Ōse (大瀬楓)	Turquoise	2006-2009	Added September 2006; graduated August 22, 2009

== Discography ==
=== Albums ===
==== Studio albums ====
Title	Details	Peak (JPN)	Notes
1 Be Possible! (as The Possible)	Released: March 14, 2007; Label: Good Factory Record; Formats: CD	97	Debut studio album
2 Shiawase no Akashi (②幸せの証) (as The Possible)	Released: March 28, 2012; Label: TN-mix; Formats: CD	—	Second studio album
1116 (as The Possible)	Released: September 3, 2014; Label: Victor Entertainment; Formats: CD	55	Released in Regular and Limited editions; compiles Victor-era singles alongside new tracks including "Ribbon" and "Do Me! Do!".
Alive 4U!!!!	Released: August 3, 2016; Label: Piccolo Town; Formats: CD	13	Final studio album. Released in two versions ("Robiyuki Edition" and "TWINS Edition") with distinct track sequences and edition-specific bonus tracks.

==== Extended plays ====
Title	Details	Peak (JPN)
Roku-nenme Start! (6年目スタート!) (as The Possible)	Released: August 31, 2011; Label: TN-mix; Formats: CD	—

==== Compilation albums ====
Title	Details	Peak (JPN)
Kyūkyoku no The Possible Best Number Shū 1 (究極のTHE ポッシボー ベストナンバー集1) (as The Possible)	Released: September 17, 2008; Label: TN-mix; Formats: CD	72
Aratamemashite, The Possible Desu! ~Nyūmon-hen Best~ (あらためまして、THE ポッシボーです!～入門編ベスト～) (as The Possible)	Released: February 20, 2013; Label: Victor Entertainment; Formats: CD	233

==== Compilation and soundtrack appearances ====
Release date	Release	Contributed track(s)	Label / Notes
March 3, 2010	Mecha Mote Iinchō Mecha Hit Kyokushū (1) (めちゃモテ委員長 めちゃヒット曲集(1))	Theme songs including "Mecha Mote I Love You" and "Kirei ni Naritai"	TN-mix; credited to MM Gakuen Gasshōbu (members of The Possible and Canary Club)
December 1, 2010	NICE Best (NICE ベスト)	Selected group tracks	TN-mix; Nice Girl Project! compilation
March 16, 2011	Butai Fushigi Yūgi Original Soundtrack (舞台 ふしぎ遊戯 オリジナル・サウンドトラック)	"Moshi Kimi ga Negau Nara" (もし君が願うなら)	TNX / Pony Canyon; performed by Aina Hashimoto and Yurika Akiyama
August 24, 2011	Minna no Rhythm Tengoku Zenkyokushū (みんなのリズム天国全曲集)	"Minna no Rhythm Tengoku Remix 8 (I Love You Watashi no Kimi)"	TN-mix / Pony Canyon; Wii game soundtrack (includes regular, Perfect, and instrumental versions)
2008 / 2011	Rhythm Tengoku Zenkyokushū (リズム天国全曲集)	"Box Show (Koi no Rung Rung Paradise)"	TN-mix; Rhythm Tengoku Gold (Nintendo DS) soundtrack
December 18, 2013	Nameko no CD 2 (なめこのCD2)	"Nfuutto Merry Christmas!" (んふっとメリークリスマス！)	nnfnnf records; track 7 on the official Mushroom Garden compilation album
November 12, 2014	WORKS (TACOS NAOMI)	"Dream Comes True" (feat. THE Possible)	Allex Entertainment; track 1, cover of NOISE FACTORY

=== Singles ===
==== Indie singles (as The Possible) ====
Title	Year	Peak (JPN)	Album
"Young Days!" (ヤングDAYS!)	2006	—	1 Be Possible!
"Hatsukoi no Kakera" (初恋のカケラ)	2006	111	1 Be Possible!
(主食=GOHANの唄)	2007	65	1 Be Possible!
"Natsu no Tropical Musume." (夏のトロピカル娘。) (feat. Yurika Akiyama and Aina Hashimoto)	2007	58	Kyūkyoku no The Possible Best Number Shū 1
"Kingyo Sukui to Hanabi Taikai" (金魚すくいと花火大会) (feat. Robin Shoko Okada and Yuki Goto)	2007	57	Kyūkyoku no The Possible Best Number Shū 1
"Kaze no Uwasa" (風のうわさ)	2007	43	Kyūkyoku no The Possible Best Number Shū 1
"Happy 15"	2007	28	Kyūkyoku no The Possible Best Number Shū 1
"Love Message!" (ラヴメッセージ!)	2008	20	Kyūkyoku no The Possible Best Number Shū 1

==== Major singles ====
Title	Year	Peak (JPN)	Album
"Kazoku e no Tegami" (家族への手紙) (as The Possible)	2008	10	Kyūkyoku no The Possible Best Number Shū 1
"Ijiwaru Crazy Love" (いじわる Crazy love) (as The Possible)	2008	10	2 Shiawase no Akashi
"Shiawase no Katachi" (幸せの形) (as The Possible)	2009	4	2 Shiawase no Akashi
"Family: Tabidachi no Asa" (Family〜旅立ちの朝〜) (as The Possible)	2009	8	2 Shiawase no Akashi
"Watashi no Miryoku/Love² Paradise" (私の魅力/LOVE²パラダイス) (as The Possible)	2010	9	2 Shiawase no Akashi
"Nanja Korya?!" (なんじゃこりゃ?!) (as The Possible)	2012	23	1116
"Zenryoku Banzai! My Glory!" (全力バンザーイ! My Glory!) (as The Possible)	2013	7	1116
"Otome! Be Ambitious!" (乙女! Be Ambitious!) (as The Possible)	2013	5	1116
"Yūki Super Ball!" (勇気スーパーボール!) (as The Possible)	2014	5	1116
"Omotesandō/Futakotamagawa/Never Never Give Up" (表参道/二子玉川/Never Never Give Up)	2015	3	Alive 4U!!!!
"Dōshiyo, Watashi/Ichigo Ichie" (どうしよう、わたし/一期一会)	2016	5	Alive 4U!!!!
"High Tension! Wagga Jinsei!/Wadachi" (ハイテンション! 我っが人生!/轍)	2017	11	Non-album single

==== Digital singles ====
Release date	Title	Notes
December 20, 2017	"Nandomo Nandomo..." (何度も 何度も...)	Final single prior to disbandment

==== Collaboration singles ====
Release date	Title	Credited artist / Notes
May 16, 2007	"Tawawa Natsu Bikini" (たわわ夏ビキニ)	Ami Tokito with The Possible
June 2, 2010	"Yabe~nabe~na Atsuryoku Be~na~" (やべ〜なべ〜な 圧力ベ〜ナ〜)	The Possible with Oto no Moto (Takashi Fujii & Oniyakko Tsubaki); peaked at No. 30 on Oricon
March 21, 2012	"Playball" (プレイボール)	Masahide Mikage with Razz Like Air / The Possible & Mana Ogawa
September 17, 2014	"Mugen, Fly High!!" (無限、Fly High!!)	Team Makenki (The Possible, You Kikkawa, and Up Up Girls (Kakko Kari))

==== Live singles ====
Release date	Title	Notes
November 25, 2011	"Shiawase Hanabi Go Go GOOO! ~Buchinomese! Dai Pinch!~" (幸せ花火ゴッゴッGOーッ! 〜ぶちのめせ! 大ピンチ!〜)	First in a series of three monthly concert-only singles (recorded November 12, 2011)
January 15, 2012	"Kibō to Seishun no Hikari ~Come on! Pika! Pika!~" (希望と青春のヒカリ)	Second live venue-limited single
February 25, 2012	"Sakurairo no Romantic" (桜色のロマンチック)	Third live venue-limited single
December 19, 2012	"Zenryoku Banzai! My Glory!" (全力バンザーイ! My Glory!)	Fourth live venue-limited single (recorded December 1, 2012, prior to major release)

=== DVDs ===
==== Concert DVDs ====
- September 19, 2007: Tokito Ami with The Possible Live '07 ~Ami Kore Possi Kore~ (時東ぁみ with THE ポッシボー ライブ'07〜ぁみコレ ポッシコレ〜)
- September 19, 2007: The Possible Hatsu Shuen Kōen!! (THE ポッシボー初主演公演!!)
- May 17, 2007 The Possible Live Document DVD -2008.3.30 Yokohama Blitz ~Yokohama ☆ Koi no Catch Ball~ Hatsu Tandoku Live e no Michi- (THE ポッシボー ライブドキュメントDVD-2008.3.3横浜BLITZ～横浜☆恋のキャッチボー～初単独ライブへの道-)
- January 30, 2009: The Possible 2008 Aki: SEXY Generation (THE ポッシボー 2008秋〜SEXY ジェネレーション〜)
- July 4, 2009: The Possible Live 2009 Haru: Shiawase no Katachi Kansha no Katachi (THE ポッシボーライブ2009春〜幸せの形 感謝の形〜)
- May 27, 2012: The Possible Tandoku Live 2012 Shiawase no Akashi (THE ポッシボー 単独ライブ2012 幸せの証)
- October 23, 2013: The Possible Tomeihan Live Tour 2013 Shōbu ~Gōkei 2222-mei Dōin de Sunplaza Osae!!~
- March 4, 2015: Iwai The Possible Japan Tour 2014 ~8-nen Kakarimashita wa~ FINAL (DVD/Blu-ray)
- October 2018: Ciao Bella Cinquetti LAST LIVE ~Thank You! Dearest!~

==== Image and music video DVDs ====
- March 21, 2008: Hajimete no Mizugi DE Possible! in OKINAWA
- September 26, 2008: Baribari Mizugi DE Possible ~A Team~ / ~B Team~
- August 2, 2011: The Possible 5th Anniversary DVD "Gonen Jukusei"

==== Hello! Project Concert DVDs ====
- March 28, 2007: Hello! Project 2007 Winter: Shūketsu! 10th Anniversary
- September 26, 2007: Dai 1-kai Hello! Project Shinjin Kōen: Saru no Koku / Tori no Koku
- 2007: 2007 Hello! Project Shinjin Kōen 8-gatsu: Yokohama de Aimashō

== Publications ==
=== Photobooks ===
- Kyapi Kyapi Possible (キャピ♡キャピ♡ポッシボー, July 13, 2007)
- Doki Doki Possible (ドキ☆ドキ☆ポッシボー, July 13, 2007)
- Baribari Mizugi de Possible! (バリバリ水着DEポッシボー！, August 25, 2008)
