= Rhythm Heaven (video game) =

2008 video game

- North American game cover
- Developers: Nintendo SPD; TNX
- Publisher: Nintendo
- Director: Kazuyoshi Osawa
- Producer: Tsunku
- Designers: Kazuyoshi Osawa; Ko Takeuchi; Masami Yone; Takafumi Masaoka; Kyohei Seki
- Programmers: Kazuyoshi Osawa; Takafumi Masaoka
- Artist: Ko Takeuchi
- Composers: Tsunku; Masami Yone
- Series: Rhythm Heaven
- Platform: Nintendo DS
- Release: JP: July 31, 2008; NA: April 5, 2009; EU: May 1, 2009; AU: June 4, 2009; KR: September 24, 2009
- Genre: Rhythm
- Mode: Single-player

Rhythm Heaven, (Note: Known in Japan as Rhythm Tengoku Gold (Japanese: リズム天国ゴールド, Hepburn: Rizumu Tengoku Gōrudo; lit. "Rhythm Heaven Gold")) known as Rhythm Paradise in PAL regions, and Rhythm World in South Korea, is a rhythm game developed and published by Nintendo for the Nintendo DS. It is the second game in Nintendo's Rhythm Heaven series, following the Japan-only Rhythm Tengoku (2006) for the Game Boy Advance. The game was first released in Japan in July 2008, and in North America, Europe, Oceania, and South Korea throughout 2009. It is the first game in the Rhythm Heaven series to be localized outside of Japan.

Like its predecessor, Rhythm Heaven is a collection of rhythm minigames that challenge players to follow the rhythm mainly through audio cues until the end of the game, where they are given a rating based on their performance. Unlike its predecessor, which is played using buttons, the control method primarily involves the Nintendo DS's touch screen and stylus, where players flick, tap, and slide the stylus to play each rhythm game.

Rhythm Heaven received generally favorable reviews, with praise for its soundtrack, artstyle, and game selection. It was succeeded by Rhythm Heaven Fever for the Wii in 2011.

== Gameplay ==
One of the rhythm games in Rhythm Heaven, "Built To Scale". Using the stylus, players flick the screen to shoot a rod into the widget.

Unlike its predecessor which is played using the GBA's buttons, Rhythm Heaven is played using the touch screen with the DS held vertically, which is found in other DS games such as Brain Age: Train Your Brain in Minutes a Day! and Hotel Dusk: Room 215. Throughout the game, players use the stylus to play through numerous rhythm-based levels known simply as "rhythm games", each with their own specific rules. Controls used include tapping the touch screen, holding the stylus down on the touch screen, dragging it across the screen and flicking it off the screen. A guitar-based minigame late in the game known as Rockers 2 and the unlockable guitar lessons also include the use of the DS's shoulder buttons to bend guitar notes.

Rhythm Heaven contains fifty different rhythm games. They are split into ten sets, each consisting of four rhythm games and a themed Remix level that incorporates the previous games into a single song. The completion of the game's sixth remix unlocks additional sequel levels, which use the same mechanics as their predecessors but have increased difficulty and, in a few cases, introduce new patterns. Each of the remixes also contain games outside of the designated sets.

In each rhythm game, the player must attempt to keep with the rhythm throughout the level. Most levels allow the player to practice before attempting to clear the game, the exceptions being the Remix stages and some sequel games (namely those that include previously unseen patterns).

The player is given a rank at the end of a game depending on how well they did, which ranges from "Try Again" for a poor performance, to "Superb" if they complete the stage with few or no misses. To clear a rhythm game and progress onto the next level, the player needs to get a "Just OK" or "OK" rank. By receiving a "Superb" rank on each rhythm game, players receive Medals, which unlock bonus content, such as Endless Games, Rhythm Toys and Guitar Lessons. Any rhythm game that a player has received a Superb rating on may be randomly selected for a Perfect attempt. These runs require the player to complete a rhythm game perfectly without making any mistakes, with only 3 attempts being allowed per cycle. Completing a Perfect run earns more bonus features in the cafe, such as song sheets and lyrics.

While the game is automatically set to be played on right-handed mode, there is also a left-handed mode which is achieved by flipping the screen 180 degrees. Because this causes the action screen to be displayed on the right side as opposed to the left, some of the minigames are also mirrored to compensate.

== Music ==
Rhythm Heaven uses original music composed by Tsunku and Masami Yone, with vocals by TNX artists including Canary Club, the Possible, and Tsunku himself (credited as Occhama). These vocals were re-recorded in English for the Western version by other vocalists (most notably Ayaka Nagate, a former member of the Tsunku-produced Coconuts Musume), as were some of the voice cues. There were plans to include the Japanese songs in the music player section, but they were soon taken out due to space restrictions. Soundtrack albums for the game have been released in Japan, but not in North America. Additionally, the European release of Rhythm Heaven (known in the region as Rhythm Paradise) received full localizations of the songs in French, German, Italian, and Spanish, including the vocal songs in the Fan Club, The Dazzles, Frog Hop, Karate Man (A different version of Karateka from Rhythm Tengoku), and Airboarder rhythm games, and the South Korean release, where it is known in the region as Rhythm World, received a full Korean localization.

== Development ==
Rhythm Heaven was developed by Nintendo SP&D1 with the assistance of Tsunku, a music record producer, both also worked on the original Rhythm Tengoku. The conception of the game is credited to Nintendo programmer Kazuyoshi Osawa who previously worked on Metroid and WarioWare titles.

The game's development "wasn't easy" for the staff. Osawa didn't like the idea of using buttons, so he considered a control mechanic that involved the Touch Screen. The ability to touch the edge of the Touch Screen was considered, but was determined to be too difficult.

The Flick action took the staff a "little getting used to" as they had to make it feel "fair" to the player until they realized that if flicking was combined with the music it would give the players a "good sense of timing". The Flick action took them about "two to three months" to research and "six months" to eventually adapt the control into the game. Tsunku really liked the idea of the Flick action regardless of the long time to adapt. At that time, he thought of the idea for Frog Hop, which became one of the first games to be made for Rhythm Heaven. Not unlike many other games, there are various differences across regions when the game (and its following sequels) was releasing worldwide.

== Reception ==
Reception

Aggregate score
Aggregator	Score
Metacritic	83/100 (Note: Score based on 48 reviews)

Review scores
Publication	Score
1Up.com	B+
Destructoid	9/10
Eurogamer	8/10
Famitsu	34/40
Game Informer	7.5/10
GamePro	5/5
GameRevolution	B
GameSpot	7.5/10
GameSpy	4/5
GameTrailers	8.7/10
Giant Bomb	5/5
IGN	9/10
Nintendo Power	9/10
The Daily Telegraph	8/10
Wired	9/10

Rhythm Heaven received "generally favorable" reviews on review aggregation website Metacritic. Reviewers from the Japanese magazine Famitsu rated the game with two eights and two nines, bringing the total score to a 34/40.

Wired gave it a similar score of nine stars out of ten and called it "the sort of novel, deep, challenging game that people accuse Nintendo of not creating anymore." The Daily Telegraph gave it eight out of ten and said that the touches "elevate [the game] from a fun but throwaway music game into an addictive quest for rhythm perfection. It's not a music game as wonderfully elaborate as the superb Elite Beat Agents, but its ostensibly simple mechanics give it a sense of purity that a lot of games lack." The A.V. Club gave it a B and called it "the cutest drum machine on the market." Jeremy Parish of 1Up.com gave the game a B+ finding fault with the game for not surpassing the original Rhythm Tengoku, stating: "If this seems like overly harsh criticism for a game that, by all standards, is a must-play experience, it's only because it walks in the footsteps of sheer perfection. Rhythm Heaven does its job with style and aplomb, but anyone who's played the GBA original knows that the concept has been done better."

As of December 2014, Rhythm Heaven had sold 3,040,000 copies worldwide. It was also the sixth best-selling game in Japan in 2008.

== Sequels and legacy ==
Rhythm Heaven was succeeded by Rhythm Heaven Fever for the Nintendo Wii in 2011; Nintendo president Satoru Iwata saw potential in the game in people's living rooms. He replied: "When you see others play with the game and notice that he or she misses out on being perfectly in rhythm, it can also be surprisingly fun."

Four years later, another Rhythm Heaven game was released for the Nintendo 3DS under the title of Rhythm Heaven Megamix. It features games from the DS installment, as well as rhythm games from Fever and the original Rhythm Tengoku along with brand-new ones.

Rhythm Heaven is frequently referenced in the WarioWare and Super Smash Bros. series.

In March 2025, Nintendo announced a new Rhythm Heaven game, Rhythm Heaven Groove. The game was released worldwide on July 2, 2026.
