= Mad Acorn =

2012 mobile rhythm video game

- Developer: APD Inc.
- Platform: iOS
- Release: June 4, 2012
- Genre: Rhythm

Mad Acorn is an iOS rhythm game developed by South Korean studio APD Inc. and released on June 4, 2012.

== Critical reception ==
The game has a Metacritic score of 84% based on 6 critic reviews.

SlideToPlay wrote " Mad Acorn is a must have for fans of more light-hearted and cartoony rhythm game fare, like Elite Beat Agents or the Rhythm Heaven titles. It's not complicated (the ability to select difficulty levels would be nice), and it's not very long, but you'll have a head-bobbing blast anyway."

Modojo said " We can't recommend Mad Acorn enough. There's simply nothing quite like it on the App Store, and it's more than a bizarre curiosity. This is a well made and immensely entertaining video game that'll have you tapping a foot and nodding your head in no time."

Pocket Gamer UK said "Mad Acorn may not be the most polished or generously equipped rhythm-action game, but it's charming, original, and works perfectly in all the ways that really matter."

AppSpy wrote "Mad Acorn is the first in APD's series of TapTap Comix and a great start as it marries modern art forms in to a fun, interactive package that's perfect for rhythm game enthusiasts."

148Apps wrote "Mad Acorn hasn't much depth, but it does have some really nice visuals, the great art, and inherent replay value based on desire to get better, rather than through extraneous incentives. It's a great pick-up-and-play title and solid summer casual gaming choice."

Gamezebo said "Mad Acorn might have a generic soundtrack and strange mechanics, but it serves as a fantastic example of a budget rhythm-based game that captures a few elements from the all-time greats. "
