= Canary Club =

Japanese female idol group

- Origin: Japan
- Genres: J-pop
- Years active: 2007–2012
- Labels: TN-mix (2007–2011); Space Craft Group (2011–2012)
- Spinoff of: Nice Girl Project!
- Past members: Mana Ogawa; Ayumi Takada; Mikiho Niwa; Ikuko Ōura; Riho Sugiura (2007–2009); Erina Hashiguchi (2007–2009); Yuma Uchida (2007–2010); Reiko Okada (2007–2011); Yurie Matsuri (2007–2011); Chihira Mochida (2009–2015)

Canary Club (キャナァーリ倶楽部, Kyanāri Kurabu) is a Japanese girl group, founded by Tsunku in 2007 within his Nice Girl Project!.

The group debuted in 2007 with the single "SWEET & TOUGHNESS" as a nine-member group. After two albums, six singles and various line-up changes between 2007 and 2011, Canary Club was transferred to Space Craft Group in 2011 with all members transferring except for Chihira Mochida, who remained a member of the group under TNX until her departure from the label in January 2015.. Since transferring, Canary Club have released songs for the games Rhythm Heaven and Rhythm Heaven Fever in 2008 and 2011 respectively.

In a blog post discussing her departure, Chihara Mochida revealed that Canary Club went on hiatus in May 2012 to focus on individual activities.

== Members ==
Can's (subunit)

- Mana Ogawa (小川真奈, nickname: Ogamana), born July 2, 1993 (age 31)
- Ayumi Takada (高田あゆみ, nickname: Ayubee), born October 20, 1984 (age 40)

Aries (subunit)

- Mikiho Niwa (丹羽未来帆, nickname: Mikki), born September 27, 1989 (age 35)
- Ikuko Ōura (大浦育子, nickname: Ikucchi), born September 22, 1989 (age 35)

=== Former members ===
Can's

- Riho Sugiura (杉浦里穂, nickname: Rippon), born February 3, 1992 (age 33) — left in January 2009
- Erina Hashiguchi (橋口恵莉奈, nickname: Eri~na), born November 18, 1996 (age 28) — left in June 2009

Aries

- Yuma Uchida (内田由麻, nickname: Ucchi), born November 7, 1994 (age 30) — left in March 2010
- Reiko Okada (岡田怜子, nickname: Okkyan), born June 19, 1993 (age 31) — left in May 2011
- Yurie Matsui (松井友里絵, nickname: Macchan), born April 6, 1988 (age 36) — left in May 2011

Subunit unknown

- Chihira Mochida (持田千妃来, nickname: Chiichan), born October 12, 1997 (age 27) — joined in late 2009, left in January 2015

== Discography ==
=== Singles ===
No.	Title	Release date	Charts	Album
No.	Title	Release date	JPN	Album
1	"Sweet & Toughness" (SWEET&TOUGHNESS)	May 3, 2007	89	1 Kanari Canary
2	"Seishun Banzai!" (青春万歳!)	July 25, 2007	63	1 Kanari Canary
3	"Faith!" (FAITH!)	January 1, 2008	50	2 Eejanaika
4	"Nishiki Kazare" (ニシキカザレ)	April 9, 2008	28	2 Eejanaika
5	"Hitomi ga Kirakirara" (瞳がキラキララ)	July 16, 2008	22	2 Eejanaika
6	"Daisukki!" (ダイスッキ!)	August 4, 2010	50	—

DVD singles

=== Albums ===
No.	Album details	Charts
No.	Album details	JPN
1	1 Kanari Canary (①かなりキャナァーリ): mini-album; Released: October 17, 2007	—
2	2 Eejanaika (②エエジャナイカ): Released: August 26, 2009	—
