= Kanami =

Kanami may refer to:

- Kanami (given name), a feminine Japanese given name
- Kan'ami (1333–1384), Japanese Noh playwright
- Kanami Station, a former railway station in Anamizu, Hōsu District, Ishikawa Prefecture, Japan
