= Rhythm Heaven Groove =

2026 video game

- North American promotional artwork
- Developer: Nintendo EPD (Note: Additional development by TNX and Intelligent Systems)
- Publisher: Nintendo
- Director: Kazuyoshi Osawa
- Producers: Kouichi Kawamoto; Takayuki Shimamura; Yoshikazu Yamashita; Tsunku
- Programmers: Takafumi Masaoka; Naoki Masuda; Kosuke Teshima
- Artists: Ko Takeuchi; Kyohei Seki
- Composers: Tsunku; Koji Kamada; Kaoru Okubo; Rei Kamiya; Shinji Ushiroda; Haruki Matsumoto
- Series: Rhythm Heaven
- Platform: Nintendo Switch
- Release: WW: July 2, 2026
- Genres: Rhythm, music
- Modes: Single-player, multiplayer

Rhythm Heaven Groove, known as Rhythm Paradise Groove in PAL regions and Rhythm Tengoku: Miracle Stars in Asia, (Note: Known in Japanese, Korean, and Chinese as Rhythm Tengoku: Miracle Stars (Japanese: リズム天国 ミラクルスターズ, Hepburn: Rizumu Tengoku Mirakurusutāzu; Rhythm Tengoku: Miracle Stars). In Southeast Asia, it is still called Rhythm Heaven Groove.) is a 2026 rhythm game developed by Nintendo and TNX, published by Nintendo for the Nintendo Switch. It is the fifth installment in the Rhythm Heaven series, following Rhythm Heaven Megamix (2015) for the Nintendo 3DS.

As such in previous entries, Groove is a compilation of minigames that involve pressing buttons in time to a song's rhythm, primarily using audio cues. The game features 80 single-player rhythm minigames as well as 30 multiplayer ones. In addition to the main rhythm games, Groove features an RPG-like story mode named "Beatspell", where players use rhythm and different button combinations to cast spells and defeat monsters. The game features music composed by Japanese musician and longtime series composer Tsunku and features vocals by guest artists such as Yui Sakurai and Ado.

The game released worldwide on July 2, 2026, being the first new entry in the Rhythm Heaven series in over a decade. Groove received generally favorable reviews from critics for its gameplay, soundtrack, art direction, and accessibility features, while reception towards Beatspell was more divisive and latency issues during TV play were critiqued. As of November 5th, 2026, the game has sold 2.89 million copies worldwide, making it the second-best selling game in the series.

== Gameplay ==
One of the rhythm games in Rhythm Heaven Groove, "Hoop Trundling". Players control the character on the far-left by pressing the A button to jump through hoops in time to the rhythm of the other characters.

Rhythm Heaven Groove follows the gameplay of previous Rhythm Heaven entries, where players have to complete a series of rhythm minigames in time with the music, similar to "microgames" in the WarioWare series. While visual cues are present, players are encouraged to follow the beat of the music to get a sense of the rhythm.

Rhythm Heaven Groove features 80 single-player rhythm minigames, which are distributed in sixteen sets of five rhythm minigames, each containing four rhythm minigames and one Remix consisting of the games played in said set. The last set contains five Remixes consisting of the rhythm minigames found throughout the previous sets. After each rhythm minigame is completed, rankings based on 3 broad categories of performance are given: "Keep Trying" or "Try Again" indicates that the player failed and has to repeat the level, "Good" or "OK" indicates that the player did well enough to pass to the next level, and "Amazing" or "Superb" indicates exceptional performance, giving the player a medal which can be used to unlock extra content and Beatspell stages.

Levels with an "Amazing" or "Superb" rank may be randomly selected for an opportunity to go for a Perfect run, where players have three attempts to clear the level without making mistakes. Completing the Perfect run successfully unlocks bonus items such as comics and stories. After the player clears the initial Perfect run, the player can attempt Perfect runs for the given level at any time. Clearing the Perfect runs three times in a row unlocks Night Mode, which challenges the players to rely exclusively on audio cues as the visuals are completely absent.

Rhythm Heaven Groove also features 30 multiplayer minigames. There are 10 total unique minigames—some cooperative, some competitive—each with three different levels of difficulty. Earning an "Amazing" or "Superb" on these levels grants the player rings, which can be used to unlock extra multiplayer content.

The game features text-to-speech used for the accessibility of blind and visually impaired players. When turned on, on-screen text, as well as audio descriptions, is read aloud by the game's mascot, Li'l Miss Reeds.

== Plot (Beatspell) ==
A magician named Yu awakens in a cave with no recollection of her identity. A disembodied voice from outside the cave greets Yu and reteaches her how to perform magical spells by gesturing in time with rhythm, using a scarecrow as a training dummy. The voice instructs Yu to battle the monsters within the cave to prevent them from reaching the kingdom's castle. As Yu progresses, she encounters the Four Fears, a group of powerful monsters aiming to decimate the castle. As each of them are defeated, the player is given Narra's Memoirs, which relay the events leading up to Yu's journey.

Some time prior, a child named Narra ventured to a mountain before being ambushed by a monster. A stranger intervened and defeated the monster using rhythmic magic. Inspired by the stranger's bravery, Narra immediately vowed to become a magician herself, and following rigorous study was eventually accepted into the Magician's Guild. After noticing that the Guild's leader was the very stranger who saved her life, she became determined to someday lead the Guild herself.

During one of her assignments, Narra was paired with Yu, at the time a notorious slacker. Despite Narra initially resenting Yu, the two became close friends after they protected one another during a monster ambush. Over time, Yu's rhythmic prowess was noticed by her peers and improved to the extent that Narra fiercely competed to keep up with her. As a result, Narra's own reputation soared. When the leader of the Guild was gravely injured by a monster and resigned, he unilaterally nominated Yu to become the next leader and Narra her vice-chair.

Narra became greatly jealous. In her rage, she uncovered a forbidden book detailing magic that could summon demons and grant immense power. She followed the book's instructions and manifested a demon. The demon promptly corrupted part of Narra's mind, causing her to lose consciousness. Upon waking up, Narra was approached by Yu; immediately, Narra sealed Yu away in the monster-infested cave. As word of Yu's disappearance reached the Guild, its students panicked but ultimately presumed that she had simply wandered off on her own. The Guild's council nominated Narra to become the Guild's leader. Encouraged by her demonic side, Narra dreamed of further conquering the world.

In the present, Yu awakens after defeating the fourth Fear and is greeted by the now-sentient scarecrow. Introducing itself as a familiar once speaking for Narra, the scarecrow tells Yu that Narra was the voice commanding Yu from her home in the kingdom's castle. It further relays that during Narra's reign, she has outlawed all forms of music; the scarecrow believes a demon has corrupted her, and pleads for Yu to save her. Realizing that Yu remains trapped in the cave, the scarecrow informs her of three sacred spaces in the cave rumored to give magicians untold power. As each space's magic is obtained, the player receives Demon Narra's Memoirs, which detail the events following Narra's nomination as Guild leader.

While corrupted, Narra learned that the demon she summoned was once a judge in the underworld that gave punishments to guilty souls. The demon did a poor job, often letting souls slip away and gather into an adjacent cave, the one Yu had been sealed within, where they would become monsters. The monsters could occasionally breach the surface and attack humans; since the monsters resented the demon for its incompetence, Narra assumed that they would try to find and kill her. Seeking to stop the monsters before they could escape the cave, she used her powers to awaken Yu and convince her to defeat them herself. After Yu defeated the Four Fears, Narra put her to sleep and continued her quest to dominate the world. Narra grew concerned by Yu's unprompted awakening and the scarecrow's autonomy, but her demonic side assured her that Yu would not pose a threat.

Once again in the present, Yu uses the sacred spaces' magic to learn exorcism, escapes to the surface, and travels to the castle. Yu confronts the corrupted Narra, who claims that she could never live up to Yu and intends to use her newfound powers to finally prove that she is better. Narra is ultimately bested by Yu in combat; dejected, Narra begs her to exorcise the demon. The demon materializes and encases Narra's inanimate body within an amulet. In a final battle, Yu kills the demon and frees Narra from its influence.

After peace is restored to the land, Narra recovers and writes a letter to Yu, apologizing for her actions. She reveals that after abandoning the scarecrow, the former leader of the Guild had taken control over the creature in her place to assist Yu; she ends the letter by expressing gratitude to both of them.

== Development and release ==
Rhythm Heaven Groove was developed by mainly by Nintendo EPD and Tsunku's TNX, with additional work done by Intelligent Systems. Kazuyoshi Osawa, the director for the first two games in the series (Rhythm Tengoku and Rhythm Heaven), assumed the same role for Groove. Series veterans Tsunku, who composed the music throughout the series, and Ko Takeuchi, who also was the artist for the WarioWare games, assumed the roles of Miracle Producer and Art Director, respectively.

In 2020, series producer Tsunku expressed his hopes on a new entry in the Rhythm Heaven series for the Nintendo Switch, stating that a new game would work well on the console, advocating for fans to express their interest to Nintendo. He had private doubts that another entry could be made, wondering how difficult it would be to popularize rhythm games in the contemporary age. According to Tsunku, he received numerous inquiries about developing a "similar but different" series, but politely declined out of a belief a new Rhythm Heaven game would eventually be made. In 2025, during the initial announcement, Tsunku was revealed to return as the producer and composer, where he worked on the game without his vocal cords due to recovering from laryngeal cancer in 2014.

=== Music ===
The game features guest singers such as Yui Sakurai from Fruits Zipper, who sang "My Telepathy! Watashi no Atsui Kosen", (Note: Japanese: My Telepathy!私の熱い光線) and Ado, who sang "Love Me Forever!"

=== Announcement and release ===
Rhythm Heaven Groove was first announced during a Nintendo Direct presentation in March 2025, showcasing gameplay through various rhythm-based minigames and revealing the use of various art styles instead of one unified style. The game was revealed alongside Tomodachi Life: Living the Dream (2026), with both being the first new entries for their respective series in over a decade. The presentation also revealed the release window of 2026, around eleven years since the original release of Rhythm Heaven Megamix (2015) in Japan, which was a compilation of minigames from past entries, and around fifteen years since the last all-new entry to the series, Rhythm Heaven Fever (2011).

On April 9, 2026, Nintendo showcased one of the rhythm minigames, "Slice N Dice Kitchen", a rhythm game about chopping vegetables, through the Nintendo Today! app and revealed that the game will release on July 2, 2026 worldwide. It was priced at US$39.99.

More information was shown in another Nintendo Direct presentation on June 9, 2026, where it was revealed that the game would have 80 new rhythm games in its single-player mode, and over 30 in its multiplayer mode. The presentation also revealed a role-playing game-style game mode called "Beatspell", where players cast damaging and healing spells by pressing different buttons to the beat, defeating enemies while progressing through a dungeon until they are met with the boss. A Nintendo Treehouse live stream that took place immediately after the Direct showcased several of the new rhythm games and game modes. A free demo containing the first four rhythm games and the first Remix of the single-player mode, and one of the multiplayer rhythm games, "Rhythm Tweezers", was released on June 22, 2026. On the same day as the game's release, seven music tracks were added to the Nintendo Music app as a "special release".

== Reception ==
Reception

Aggregate scores
Aggregator	Score
Metacritic	82/100 (Note: Score based on 100 reviews)
OpenCritic	87% recommend (Note: Score based on 107 reviews)

Review scores
Publication	Score
Eurogamer	4/5
Famitsu	8/10, 8/10, 9/10, 9/10
Game Informer	8.25/10
GameSpot	8/10
GamesRadar+	4/5
Giant Bomb	4/5
IGN	9/10
Nintendo Life	8/10
Shacknews	8/10
TechRadar	4/5
Video Games Chronicle	5/5

=== Critical reception ===
Rhythm Heaven Groove received "generally favorable" reviews on review aggregation website Metacritic, and 87% of critics recommended the game on OpenCritic. Four critics from the Japanese magazine Famitsu rated the game with two 8/10 and two 9/10 scores, bringing the total score to a 34/40.

Groove's gameplay and art direction were commended as charming and mechanically creative. Numerous critics highlighted the minigames as absurd and irreverent, (Note: Attributed to multiple sources:) some likening them to those of the WarioWare series. Gavin Lane of Nintendo Life described Groove's minigames as a blend between the gameplay of WarioWare and the "irresistible energy and spirit" of Katamari Damacy. IGN's Sarah Thwaites opined that the minigames' regular usage of visually-impeding distractions made for a "rewarding approach to the genre" in its reliance on audio cues, highlighting the end-of-stage Remixes as thrilling. Asami Rina of Game Watch found that understanding the changes in arrangement and structure of Groove's songs rather than relying on visual aids was key to mastery. Oscar Taylor-Kent of GamesRadar+ also wrote highly of Remixes, finding that their fast-paced structure was balanced out with enough visual information to make mastery possible without re-explanation of minigames' controls. Dave Aubrey of Video Games Chronicle was impressed with Groove's application of a simple control scheme to create what he saw as challenging and varied gameplay.

Reception towards Beatspell was more divisive. Taylor-Kent observed a sense of mechanical depth in spite of what he saw as simple visual presentation. Thwaites found the mode "slightly underbaked" compared to Groove's other campaigns. She called Beatspell's gameplay trite in its early levels; this critique was echoed by Lane and Harry Padoan of TechRadar, who both found Beatspell as a whole exceedingly repetitive. Lane disliked the indefinite length of battles as requiring them to be backed by looping songs he found atypical of Rhythm Heaven soundtracks, while Padoan felt the music, narrative, and enemies were "less charismatic than what the series typically delivers".

The soundtrack was largely enjoyed by critics. Of the songs, Jordan Biordi of CG Magazine found it difficult "not to find a new favourite as each new stage opens up". Kyle Hilliard of Game Informer wrote that while he did enjoy game's entire level library, he found that none of them immediately struck him as all-time series favorites. Gamereactor's David Caballero found Groove's songs inspired, giving special praise to the Japanese-language tracks. Thwaites felt that the diversity of the game's songs in tempo and genre prevented Groove's single-player campaign from becoming tiring. Aubrey compared Groove's emphasis on musical immersion to that of Tetris Effect (2018), writing that Groove gave him a "new perspective on rhythm, time signatures, and off-beat patterns".

Groove's accessibility features were highlighted. Biordi praised its text-to-speech functionality and simplistic control scheme as inviting for impaired players, calling Groove the most accessible Nintendo game to date. He also felt that Groove's introductory tutorials for its minigames were more generous with timing than those of previous entries. Graham Russel of Siliconera observed the game's user interface (UI) as being deliberately minimalist to avoid reliance on visual aids; while he applauded Nintendo's efforts towards accessibility, he felt that this choice led to an overly rudimentary aesthetic. Padoan personally disliked the voice of Li'l Miss Reeds but otherwise respected the text-to-speech options for their assistive nature.

Technical issues regarding controller latency in docked play were criticized. Lane expressed frustration in how noticeable his controller's input delay when playing on a TV was, finding that the Switch's handheld and tabletop modes were the definitive way to experience Groove. TJ Denzer of Shacknews found TV play consistently worse than handheld play regardless of audiovisual calibration. Thwaites conversely reported few latency issues, though she observed a slight increase in input accuracy when playing in handheld mode. With regard to Groove's multiplayer minigames, Russel felt the game's latency issues would create "logistical hurdles" for in-person gatherings, opining that players would have to compromise either input precision in docked mode or seating comfort in tabletop mode.

=== Sales ===
The game debuted at No. 1 in Japanese sales charts maintained by Famitsu, recording 393,378 copies sold in its first week, ahead of Tomodachi Life: Living the Dream and Star Fox (2026). The game remained in the No. 1 spot for an additional two weeks until it was pushed to second place by Splatoon Raiders (2026). In the UK, Groove debuted in the No. 5 spot, behind Star Fox and ahead of Football Manager 26 (2025).

Groove was the best selling game in Japan in July and August 2026, becoming the fastest-selling game in the series. As of September 13, 2026, the game has sold over 1 million physical copies in Japan. As of November 5th, 2026, the game has sold 2.89 million copies worldwide.

=== Awards ===
Year	Award	Category	Result	Ref.
2026	Golden Joystick Awards 2026	Best Audio Design	Nominated	
2026	The Game Awards 2026	Innovation in Accessibility	Pending	
