= Rhythm Heaven Fever =

2011 video game

- North American game cover
- Developers: Nintendo SPD; TNX
- Publisher: Nintendo
- Producer: Tsunku
- Designers: Ko Takeuchi; Masami Yone; Takafumi Masaoka; Kyohei Seki; Takumi Hatakeyama
- Programmers: Takafumi Masaoka; Takumi Hatakeyama
- Artist: Ko Takeuchi
- Composers: Tsunku; Masami Yone; Shinji Ushiroda; Asuka Ito
- Series: Rhythm Heaven
- Platform: Wii
- Release: JP: July 21, 2011; NA: February 13, 2012; EU: July 6, 2012; AU: September 13, 2012; KR: September 12, 2013
- Genre: Rhythm
- Modes: Single-player, multiplayer

Rhythm Heaven Fever, (Note: Known in Japan as Minna no Rhythm Tengoku (Japanese: みんなのリズム天国, Hepburn: Minna no Rizumu Tengoku; Everybody's Rhythm Heaven)) known as Beat the Beat: Rhythm Paradise in PAL regions and Rhythm World Wii in Korea, is a rhythm game developed and published by Nintendo for the Wii. It is the third game in Nintendo's Rhythm Heaven series, following Rhythm Heaven (2008) for the Nintendo DS. The game was first released in Japan in July 2011, and in North America, Europe, Oceania, and South Korea throughout 2012.

Like previous entries in the Rhythm Heaven series, Rhythm Heaven Fever is a collection of rhythm minigames that challenge players to follow the rhythm mainly through audio cues until the end of the game, where they are given a rating based on their performance. The control method has been simplified compared to its predecessor, as it is only played using the Wii Remote's A and B buttons. The game also features a co-op mode where two players can play a select number of rhythm games simultaneously.

Rhythm Heaven Fever received generally favorable reviews, with praise for its soundtrack, artstyle, and game selection. The game was also digitally re-released on the Wii U eShop throughout 2016. It was succeeded by Rhythm Heaven Megamix for the Nintendo 3DS in 2015, a compilation of rhythm games from previous entries in the series that includes several rhythm games from Fever.

== Gameplay ==
One of the rhythm games in Rhythm Heaven Fever, "Screwbot Factory". Players screw robots by holding the A and B buttons on the Wii Remote in time with the rhythm.

As with Rhythm Tengoku and its DS sequel, Rhythm Heaven Fever features various levels with their own set of rules, requiring the player to play in time to the rhythm in order to clear them. There are a total of 40 minigames, some of them being sequels to previous minigames. These levels range from stabbing peas with a fork, to attacking evil spirits with a sword, playing badminton in midair, and marching in time with a flock of multicolored birds. The game is played by either tapping the A button, or squeezing the A and B buttons together. At the end of each level, players are ranked on their performance, like with the previous games in the series, the "Try Again", "OK" or "Superb" rank will be given. An "OK" or "Superb" rank is required to clear the level and progress onto the next. Each set of levels culminates in a Remix stage, which combines all of the gameplay elements of the previous levels in one stage. There are a total of 10 remixes, with the last one being a compilation of all the minigames in the game.

Clearing levels with a Superb rating earns medals that unlock extra content, including Rhythm Toys, Endless Games and four levels from the original Rhythm Tengoku, plus a bonus credits level. Levels that have been cleared with a Superb rating may also be randomly selected for a Perfect attempt, in which the player can try to clear the level without making any mistakes with a maximum of 3 retries before the perfect challenge disappears. Clearing these unlock bonus items such as songs and lyrics. The game also features a co-op mode in which two players can play simultaneously. Levels played in this mode require players to earn enough points in total to reach the desired rank and clear each stage, with bonus points awarded based on the harmony of the players that can improve the rank. These levels come with their own set of medals which can unlock multiplayer endless games.

== Development ==
Producer Yoshio Sakamoto and Nintendo SPD Group No.1 were responsible for the programming, graphic design, and some of the music in the game. The development team made some prototypes using 3D models, however, they felt that the flow of the games worked best with 2D animation. Motion controls were also ignored in favor of more accurate button controls.

Collaborator and musician Tsunku and his music studio TNX created several of the performed vocal songs found throughout the game. These songs are "Tonight" (used in Remix 3), "Lonely Storm" (used in Karate Man, with a remixed version used in its sequel), "Dreams of Our Generation" (used in Night Walk), "I Love You, My One and Only" (used in Remix 8), and "Beautiful One Day" (used in Remix 9), performed by Mana Ogawa, Soshi, Nice Girl Trainee, The Possible, and Canary Club respectively. For the English version, these songs were re-recorded by Annette Marie Cotrill, Aimee Blackschleger, and Clinton Edward Strother. Soundtrack albums for the game were only released in Japan. The first has all of the music from the game, which was released on August 24, 2011, and the second has the vocal songs used in the game, which was released on August 31, 2011.

In the English versions of the game, an endless minigame based on manzai routines was removed due to the dialogue focused nature of the game and was replaced with another minigame from Rhythm Tengoku known as "Mr. Upbeat". The European and Australian versions of the game allow players to toggle between English and Japanese voices and songs.

== Reception ==
Reception

Aggregate score
Aggregator	Score
Metacritic	83/100 (Note: Score based on 56 reviews)

Review scores
Publication	Score
1Up.com	A−
Destructoid	9.5/10
Edge	8/10
Electronic Gaming Monthly	9/10
Eurogamer	8/10
Famitsu	7/10, 8/10, 8/10, 9/10
Game Informer	8.5/10
GameRevolution	4/5
GameSpot	8/10
GameTrailers	8.6/10
Giant Bomb	5/5
Hyper	8/10
IGN	7/10
Joystiq	4/5
Nintendo Power	8/10
Digital Spy	4/5
Wired	4.5/5

Rhythm Heaven Fever received "generally favorable" reviews on review aggregation website Metacritic. Reviewers from the Japanese magazine Famitsu rated the game with one seven, two eights and one nine, bringing the total score to a 32/40.

Fever sold over 100,000 copies in the country in its first week. Jose Otero from 1Up.com gave the game an A−, stating: "The amount of mileage Nintendo squeezes out of Rhythm Heaven Fever's two-button gameplay is remarkable -- more than 50 mini-games including regular stages, rhythm toys, and endless games to play -- especially in a time when the kind of games I typically consume require more button inputs."
