= Rhythm Heaven Megamix =

2015 video game

- North American promotional art
- Developers: Nintendo SPD; TNX
- Publisher: Nintendo
- Director: Masami Yone
- Producer: Tsunku
- Programmer: Takafumi Masaoka
- Artist: Ko Takeuchi
- Composers: Tsunku; Shinji Ushiroda; Asuka Ito; Yumi Takahashi; Megumi Inoue
- Series: Rhythm Heaven
- Platform: Nintendo 3DS
- Release: JP: June 11, 2015; NA: June 15, 2016; EU: October 21, 2016; AU: October 22, 2016; KR: December 1, 2016
- Genres: Rhythm, music
- Modes: Single-player, multiplayer

Rhythm Heaven Megamix, (Note: Known in Japan as Rhythm Tengoku: The Best+ (Japanese: リズム天国 ザ・ベスト＋, Hepburn: Rizumu Tengoku: Za Besuto Purasu; lit. "Rhythm Heaven: The Best Plus")) known as Rhythm Paradise Megamix in PAL regions and Rhythm World: The Best Plus in Korea, is a rhythm game developed by Nintendo and TNX and published by Nintendo for the Nintendo 3DS. It is the fourth game in Nintendo's Rhythm Heaven series, following Rhythm Heaven Fever (2011) for the Wii. The game was first released in Japan in June 2015, and in North America, Europe, Oceania, and South Korea throughout 2016.

Rhythm Heaven Megamix is primarily a compilation of over 100 rhythm minigames from the series' previous entries—Rhythm Tengoku (which was Japan-exclusive), Rhythm Heaven, and Rhythm Heaven Fever—as well as 30 new ones. Unlike previous entries in the series, Megamix features a story, where the players' objective is to rescue Tibby, who had fallen to Earth World, and bring him back home to Heaven World, passing through various sets of rhythm games to make their way back. In addition to the main story, the game features additional game modes such as the Challenge Train, which contains a selection of rhythm minigames with twists and faster-paced gameplay, including stages with WarioWare-themed minigames. Longtime series composer Tsunku returned to compose music for the game.

Rhythm Heaven Megamix sold at least 1 million copies, and received generally favorable reviews, with praise for its soundtrack, artstyle, and assistive features for newcomers, but criticism for its lengthy story mode, simplicity, and certain design choices. Rhythm Heaven Megamix was succeeded by Rhythm Heaven Groove for the Nintendo Switch in 2026.

== Gameplay ==
One of the remastered rhythm games, "Fillbots 2", which originated from Rhythm Heaven (DS). A new feature of Megamix is an input timing gauge that shows how precise the player's timing is on the bottom screen.

Like previous entries in the series, Rhythm Heaven Megamix is a compilation of several rhythm games, requiring players to play in time with the music in order to clear each one. The game uses the traditional control scheme featured in Rhythm Tengoku, which uses the A, B, and directional buttons on the Nintendo 3DS. The game also has an option to be played using the stylus controls featured in Rhythm Heaven, though the flicking mechanic found previously is absent. The game introduces new features to help the player understand their rhythm, such as an input timing gauge to show how precise the player's timing is as they play through the game. In certain places throughout the rhythm game, players have the opportunity to earn a Skill Star for precise timing in a crucial spot in the game. At the end of each rhythm game, ratings to show how well the player did are more detailed compared to previous entries, which are now awarded based on a numerical score meter with scores ranging from 0-100 alongside the traditional "Try Again", "Just OK", and "Superb" rankings. Based on the results, players are awarded coins on how well they did, with extra coins for the Skill Star and no miss runs (when players complete the game perfectly without any misses). Coins can be used to unlock bonuses from a shop, skip games after a set amount of fails, and to pay for certain trials that can be found throughout the story.

Megamix features a story in which players try to help a character named Tibby reach Heaven World, his home. In the story, rhythm games are grouped into sets of fours and fives, including 1 rhythm game from each entry in the series (Rhythm Tengoku, Rhythm Heaven, and Rhythm Heaven Fever) and a new one, with one Remix in sets of five. The game features over 100 rhythm games, including 70 taken from previous titles, and 30 brand new ones. Remix stages are introduced in the middle of the story, which combine the previous rhythm games in the set (or more rhythm games) into a song. Most remixes have a visual theme, which are incorporated into the rhythm games in the remix.

Megamix also features 3 returning endless games from each of the previous entries alongside a new one. These are implemented through occasional "trial gates" found in the story. The players can choose three trials with different difficulties, with the easiest costing the most coins. Completing at least 1 trial with a passing score allows the player to move on and continue the story. Outside of the story, players can attempt Perfect Campaigns on random rhythm games that they have a "Superb" on, requiring players to clear the game without making any mistakes, earning them Flow Balls that can be used to purchase bonus rhythm games from the shop. Players can also partake in challenges on the Challenge Train, which can be played with up to four players using local wireless via Download Play, also earning them Flow Balls when successfully completed. The Challenge Train features WarioWare crossover challenges, which replaces some of the rhythm games' main characters with characters from the WarioWare series. Megamix features a café which contains the shop, where players purchase bonus content that can be displayed and used in the Museum (also found in the café). Bonus rhythm games can be purchased using Flow Balls, while other collectables, such as Rhythm Toys and music from the game, can be purchased using coins. The café also features a dog barista that players can talk to, the Figure Fighter Duel challenge that uses the 3DS' StreetPass functionality, and a pachinko-style minigame where players can feed turnips to a goat.

== Plot ==
Tibby falls from the sky into Earth World. Upon regaining consciousness, he meets the player, who agrees to help him return to Heaven World, his home. Together, they go through Earth World, meeting several characters along the way that talk about wanting to regain their "flow" back. Eventually, they reach the Lush Tower, where the gameplay now accommodates Remix levels. After clearing the tower, Tibby is sent up by a beam to reach Heaven World, but falls and hits the ground before he can reach Heaven World. Because the beam's power is not enough to reach Heaven World, another set of towers appear, each containing sequels of the games the player has previously played, new games, and several remixes. After clearing all the towers, Tibby is sent back up again, now by multiple beams to successfully reach Heaven World. The player is later sent an invitation by Tibby to help in Heaven World, with Tibby revealing that the place is "gloomy". After going through Heaven World, they come upon the Mamarin Palace, which houses the final 3 towers. After clearing the 3 towers, including the Final Remix, Heaven World returns to normal. The player meets Tibby's mom, revealing that the place had become gloomy because Tibby's Mom had held her breath after getting hiccups.

== Development and release ==
Rhythm Heaven Megamix was developed by Nintendo SPD Production Group 1 and Tsunku's TNX. Masami Yone, the director of Rhythm Heaven Fever, assumed the same role for Megamix. He was assisted by Ko Takeuchi, who previously worked on Fever and Game & Wario, as the art director, and Yoshio Sakamoto, who previously worked on Tomodachi Life and Metroid, as the general producer.

Producer and composer Tsunku wanted Megamix to be a simple game with an easy-to-understand control scheme, a departure from how previous entries adopted the control scheme based on the hardware, such as the Nintendo DS's stylus controls and Wii Remote controls. He wanted the game to feel not like a direct sequel, but rather a way for newcomers to Rhythm Heaven to enjoy a fresh take on the series. Despite the "Best Of" moniker in the Japanese version of the game, Tsunku sought to make Megamix distinct from traditional video game compilations.

Megamix was one of the final games developed by Nintendo SPD before it was merged with Nintendo EAD to form Nintendo EPD in 2015.

=== Music ===
Like previous entries in the series, Rhythm Heaven Megamix's music is mostly composed and written by Japanese musician Tsunku. During the development of the game, Tsunku had to have his vocal cords removed after suffering laryngeal cancer. For this reason, he collaborated with various songwriters and signers. For example, for the song "I'm a lady now," Tsunku asked someone he met in New York to write the lyrics, and his six-year-old daughter was the vocalist. The song for the Megamix version of the longtime series staple "Karate Man" took several attempts to write because Tsunku felt that the proposed ideas did not line up with his vision, though some of them made their way to the Final Remix. Like the European release of Beat the Beat: Rhythm Paradise, the English versions of the game for both North America and PAL regions feature both English and Japanese audio.

=== Release ===
The game was first announced near the end of a Japanese Nintendo Direct by Satoru Iwata in January 2015, with a set release in 2015. More gameplay footage was shown in the Japanese April 2015 Nintendo Direct, accompanied with the release date for June 11, 2015, with both a physical retail and digital release in Japan. Nintendo also released badges in the Nintendo Badge Arcade and console themes to accompany the games' release.

In March 2016, through a Nintendo Direct, Nintendo announced that the game would launch in North America, Europe, Australia and Korea "later" that year. The game was released as a Nintendo eShop exclusive in North America on June 15, 2016, during the Nintendo Treehouse Livestream presentation at E3 2016. The game later received a physical retail release in Europe and Australia on October 21, 2016, and in Korea on December 1.

== Reception ==
=== Critical reception ===
Reception

Aggregate scores
Aggregator	Score
Metacritic	83/100 (Note: Score based on 37 reviews)
OpenCritic	74% recommend (Note: Score based on 27 reviews)

Review scores
Publication	Score
Destructoid	9/10
Eurogamer	Recommended
Famitsu	8/10, 8/10, 8/10, 10/10
Game Informer	8.5/10
Nintendo Life	8/10
Nintendo World Report	9/10
USgamer	4.5/5

Rhythm Heaven Megamix received "generally favorable" reviews on review aggregation website Metacritic, and 74% of critics recommended the game on OpenCritic. Four critics from the Japanese magazine Famitsu each rated the game with three eights and one ten, bringing the total score to a 34/40.

Critics praised the art style and music in the game. Zachary Miller from Nintendo World Report called the art and music "wildly experimental and never dull". Jon Wahlgren from Nintendo Life says that Megamix "absolutely oozes style," with a robust art style and that the music is "a delicious flavor of futuristic electro pop that can't help but put a smile on your face and a tap in your toes." Kyle Hilliard from Game Informer enjoyed every song in the game, including the music in the practice sessions.

The rhythm games themselves were generally favorably received by critics. Kyle Hilliard from Game Informer praised the assortment of rhythm games from new and old, commenting that the remastered games did not feel boring due to the tweaks introduced in Megamix. He commended the remixes as "exciting and challenging." However, the simplicity of several rhythm games was noted by some critics. Bob Mackey from USgamer expressed that the start of Megamix was "incredibly easy in a manner that may throw off Rhythm Heaven veterans." The implementation of the endless games in the form of the "trial gates" was also criticized. Zachary Miller from Nintendo World Report called them "antithetical to how the game is otherwise played," while Jon Wahlgren from Nintendo Life says that the increase in difficulty caused by the trials may cause some unnecessary frustration.

Several accessibility features introduced in Megamix were welcomed by critics. Caitlin Cooke from Destructoid praised the inclusion of visual aides, such as showing when to press buttons when a player is stuck on the tutorial, an input timing gauge to show the players' timing, and "a free pass" to skip a level when a player is stuck at certain challenges. Several Famitsu critics also praised the input timing gauge, allowing users to see if you missed if because they went too fast or slow. Bob Mackey from USgamer praised the smaller quality of life features, such as having the ability to "restart a level and immediately jump back" to the beginning of the level. The new accessibility features made Jon Wahlgren from Nintendo Life recommend the game as a "great introduction to the series for the uninitiated."

Many critics were divided on the implementation of the story mode. While Simon Parkin from Eurogamer called the accents of the characters' dialogue "written with vivid wit," Zachary Miller from Nintendo World Report called the story mode "inconsenquential." Jon Wahlgren from Nintendo Life also praised the quirky dialogue but called the story mode "chunky" and the implementation of the rhythm games as being "threaded around a loose narrative." Kyle Hilliard from Game Informer expressed that while the characters are humorous, the inclusion of the story mode confusing and it "stands as a barrier you must click through to get back to the music."

=== Sales ===
The game debuted at No. 1 in Japanese charts maintained by Media Create, recording 158,000 copies sold in its first week of release, ahead of games such as Splatoon and Dragon Ball Z: Extreme Butoden. As of December 31, 2022, the game had sold over 1.03 million copies worldwide.
