= Rhythm Tengoku =

2006 video game

- Japanese GBA box art
- Developers: Nintendo SPD; J.P.Room; Sega (arcade)
- Publishers: Nintendo; Sega (arcade)
- Director: Kazuyoshi Osawa
- Producers: Tsunku; Yoshio Sakamoto
- Designers: Tsunku; Kazuyoshi Osawa; Yoshio Sakamoto
- Programmer: Kazuyoshi Osawa
- Artist: Ko Takeuchi
- Composers: Tsunku; Masami Yone
- Series: Rhythm Heaven
- Platforms: Game Boy Advance; Arcade
- Release: Game Boy Advance: JP: August 3, 2006; Arcade: JP: September 20, 2007
- Genre: Rhythm
- Modes: Single player, multiplayer (Arcade)
- Arcade system: Sega NAOMI

Rhythm Tengoku (Note: Japanese: リズム天国, Hepburn: Rizumu Tengoku; lit. Rhythm Heaven) is a 2006 rhythm game developed and published by Nintendo for the Game Boy Advance. It was originally released on August 3, 2006, and was the last first-party game to be released for the console. The game began as an idea created by its composer and supervisor Tsunku, who proposed it to Nintendo due to his belief that they could do a better job with it than he could. An arcade version of the game was reprogrammed and published by Sega on September 20, 2007. Both versions were released in Japan exclusively. The game was the first in the Rhythm Heaven series which spawned four international sequels; Rhythm Heaven, Rhythm Heaven Fever, Rhythm Heaven Megamix, and Rhythm Heaven Groove.

Rhythm Tengoku's gameplay focuses more on audio cues than visual cues to convey information to players. It features a number of unique stages which have their own type of rhythm and gameplay. Players follow the rhythm (in some rhythm games as a character) until the end where they are given a score based on their performance. The gameplay and music were both well received by critics and consumers. Parallels have been drawn between it and the developer's previous work on the WarioWare series.

== Gameplay ==
One of the rhythm games in Rhythm Tengoku, "Karateka". Using the A button, players punch various objects in time to the rhythm.

Rhythm Tengoku is a rhythm game similar to the WarioWare series of video games due in part to its simplistic controls and art style. Due to Rhythm Tengoku being similar to the WarioWare series, it includes a reference to Orbulon's Alien Bunnies, also known as Space Rabbits, used as a replacement for the Squadmates from the "Marcher" minigame in some of the remixed sections featuring it. Rhythm Tengoku features eight sets which consist of six rhythm games each. Each set's sixth stage is a remix of the previous games all at once. The games change in turn throughout the remix, which is accompanied by a new song. One remix, Remix 5 has some characters wearing alternate costumes. The sixth set consists of the final minigames from each stage, but are much harder. The seventh and eighth sets consist of some random minigames from each stage, completely unchanged but now have different charting and different sprites. Players unlock more rhythm games by completing the rhythm games in order. The object of each rhythm game is to match the rhythm the game expects of players which varies from stage to stage. The game primarily relies on audio cues to indicate the rhythm. Players are given one of three ratings at the end of every stage - Try Again, OK, and Superb. Players must achieve an OK rank in order to proceed to the next game. Players who achieve Superb receive a medal which can be used to unlock Endless Games, Rhythm Toys, and Drum Lessons. The player needs to clear all five games and the Remix in the Set with at least an OK to move on.

On some occasions, players are allowed to attempt a Perfect Campaign of a randomly selected stage. If players make any misses in the stage while making the attempt, a life/chance is lost, and the player must restart the stage from the beginning. Players have three lives/chances to attempt this before it either disappears or moves on to another rhythm game. Players who succeed receive an in-game certificate as well as a gift (varying on the rhythm game). If they obtain all certificates, they get a special certificate as well as access to all songs in the drum mode. The game's drum controls allow players to use the different buttons on the Game Boy Advance to control various aspects of the drums.

In the Arcade version of the game, players start the game with two hearts. Each heart is lost when starting a Rhythm Game. Getting a Superb or Perfect gives the player an extra heart. If the player runs out of hearts, they will need to spend a credit to continue (or, depending on the machine's settings, multiple credits, or none if set to Free Mode). All of the Rhythm Games are available from the start in this arcade version, but the player needs to clear all five games per Set with at least an OK in order to play the Remix (Depending on the settings, the Remix may be unselectable, requiring the player to clear all the games in order to play it). There is also a 2 Player Mode for this version. In addition, some games that did not receive tutorials in the GBA release now have practice sessions for them. If the player has played perfectly for the first half of a Rhythm Game, the "Go for a Perfect!" notice will appear on the bottom of the screen, and obtaining it does the same as getting a Superb. The Arcade version has a leaderboard feature, which tallies up the score based on the player's Flow at the end of a stage.

== Development ==
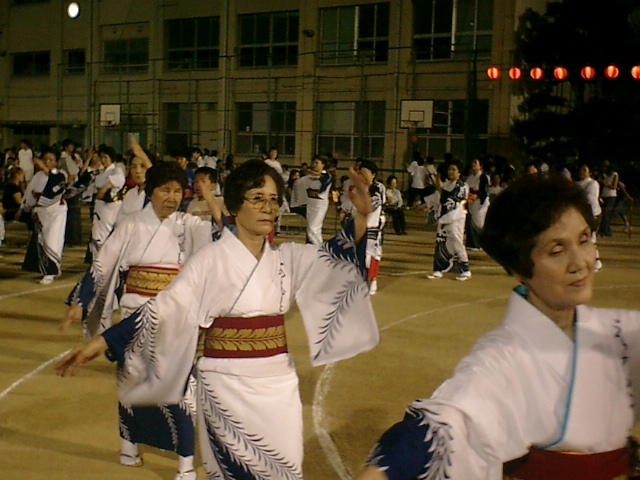
The "Bon Odori" stage is based on a Japanese Bon Festival.

The game's development began sometime in 2002, under the working title of Rhythm IQ, when Kazuyoshi Osawa had created a tech demo for the GBA where players could play a drum kit, with each button on the console being designated to a different drum. The Drum Lessons and Live modes are directly derived from this original concept for the final game, four years later. Originally, the Rhythm Games would have been separated in categories, with each one specializing in different aspects of rhythm; but the ultimate decision was to have the games assorted, with the reasoning being that sorting the games like that could have made the progression much more monotonous.

In 2004, Tsunku brought his proposal to Nintendo of a rhythm game that did not rely on visual indicators for its rhythm. Osawa was wary that people would enjoy it due to its lack of a music score as he felt that it might only appeal to a niche audience. It was decided to be released on the GBA due to Osawa's desire for a smaller screen and portability. Several of the game's staff members came to Tokyo for development research and inspiration to take dance lessons in order to improve their rhythm by the recommendation of the game's music composer Tsunku, dancing to the music of Remixes 1, 2, and 4. One stage that made an impression was Rhythm Tweezers, a level that featured an onion with a face from which players pluck its hair. It was originally going to be a real face, but it was deemed "a little too gross." Another stage is called The Bon Odori and is based on the real-world Japanese Bon Festival.

Before the game's release, a Kiosk Demo named Rhythm Tengoku Taikenban (Note: Japanese: リズム天国 体験版, Hepburn: Rizumu Tengoku Taikenban; lit. Rhythm Heaven: Trial Version) was playable in shops, allowing people to try out the game before it was released. The Kiosk Demo only lets the player play three of the Rhythm Games from Set 1; Karate Man, Rhythm Tweezers and The Clappy Trio, as well as the Rhythm Test (only the first part of it can be played through). The Kiosk Demo also reminds the game's price of 3,800 Yen on the title screen, the Rhythm Game select menu, and even in the Rhythm Games themselves (appearing at the end of The Clappy Trio and Rhythm Tweezers, and in the background of Karate Man once the player reaches 50% (three hearts or more) on the Flow Meter).

Rhythm Tengoku was first revealed in an issue of Famitsu, and was released in Japan only during August 3, 2006 for the Game Boy Advance (GBA) and was developed by Nintendo SPD and published by Nintendo. Key staff members include Kazuyoshi Osawa, Tsunku (music composer and supervisor), Masami Yone (sound designer), and Ko Takeuchi (graphic designer).

One year after the game's release, Sega approached the staff with an offer to co-develop an arcade version of the game for the Sega Naomi, which was released September 20, 2007. This was due to the popularity of the game with its development staff. Osawa brought this offer to the attention of Nintendo president Satoru Iwata and others who approved of the idea. Yone had to make adjustments in the arcade version due to the differences between arcade mechanics and console mechanics. The arcade version had remastered graphics (One rhythm game to have this change in the arcade version, most notably, was Karate Man). It also featured an extra set based on Set 1, but at 150% speed and with newly remixed music to match (Note: The vocals in the Karate Man: Tempo Up! extra stage are the same).

The arcade release also features multiplayer. Rhythm Tengoku was also the only game licensed by Nintendo for the Sega Naomi, and it was one of the very few games developed by Nintendo and Sega respectively.

== Reception ==
Reception

Review scores
Publication	Score
Eurogamer	8/10
Nintendo World Report	8.5/10

Rhythm Tengoku has received generally positive reception. While it did not receive much attention before its release, it was very well received by consumers. The game received an Excellence Prize for Entertainment at the 10th annual Japan Media Arts Festival in 2006. Video game designer Frank Lantz listed Rhythm Tengoku amongst his five favourite games. Eurogamer's staff ranked it the 36th best game of 2006 while its readership voted it the 50th best. Tom of Eurogamer called it the best Game Boy Advance game of the year while he and fellow Eurogamer staff member James felt that it was at least on par with Elite Beat Agents (which also received positive reception). GameSpy's Andrew Alfonso praised its music, gameplay, and variety; he felt however that it was not long enough. GamesRadar staff included the game's drum lessons in its list of the "20 Magical Nintendo moments". A reviewer at Computer and Video Games (CVG) gave praise to it for its Pocket Fighter and WarioWare-like humour and its quality music but felt that the game lacked replay value and length. Kotaku's Brian Ashcraft called it "one of the Game Boy Advance's most interesting (and enjoyable) titles". GamesRadar's Shane Patterson recommended it for people who liked WarioWare's art aesthetics and music. CVG's Andy Kelly included the Bon Odori song in his list of the 100 best video game themes ever. He called it "insanely catchy." Eurogamer's Chris Schilling used Rhythm Tengoku as an example of a game that would be overlooked if the Game Boy Advance was region-locked. 1Up.com's Bob Mackey called its lack of an American release "one of the great Game Boy Advance injustices of 2006". Wired's Chris Kohler noted that Rhythm Tengoku (as well as other games) should be released on the Virtual Console or WiiWare services, but it was not.

== Sequels and legacy ==
Rhythm Tengoku has since received four sequels, starting with Rhythm Tengoku Gold, released for the Nintendo DS in 2008 in Japan. It uses touchscreen controls rather than buttons. In 2009, it was released in North America and Europe under the titles Rhythm Heaven and Rhythm Paradise, respectively, making it the first game in the series to be released outside of Japan. The names in question have been used for all later entries in their respective regions.

Later entries in the series feature several minigames that are found in Tengoku. Rhythm Heaven Fever, released for the Wii in 2011 in Japan and 2012 in the West, features four minigames from Tengoku as bonus games unlocked by getting a certain number of medals. Rhythm Heaven Megamix, released for the Nintendo 3DS in 2015 in Japan and 2016 in the West, predominantly features rhythm games from previous titles, including Tengoku. Rhythm Heaven Groove, the latest entry in the series, released for the Nintendo Switch in 2026 internationally.

The first minigame in Tengoku, Karateka (known in English as Karate Man), has become a staple of the series, with each game afterwards including a minigame based on it with new mechanics and music.

Rhythm Heaven also gets referenced frequently in the WarioWare and Super Smash Bros. series.

Rhythm Tengoku and its sequels were the source of inspiration for several rhythm video games, such as Beat City, Beat Sneak Bandit, and Melatonin. Simon Flesser (designer of Beat Sneak Bandit) cites Rhythm Tengoku's artistic design and mixture of beats and back beats as influences in its design.
