= Ayumi Takada =

Japanese pop singer and fashion model (born 1984)

Ayumi Takada (高田 あゆみ, Takada Ayumi, born October 20, 1984) is a Japanese pop singer and fashion model. She is currently a member of Canary Club CAN'S division with Mana Ogawa. She is known to have very flexible ears as they were featured in Star King on October 15, 2011.

== Television appearances ==
- Akko Ni Omakase! (アッコにおまかせ!) (March 2009, TBS)
- Kimi Habureiku (キミハブレイク) (June 2009, TBS)
- Supanichi!! Kyokutaan (スパニチ!!キョクターン) (July 2011, TBS)
- Star King (October 15, 2011, SBS in South Korea)
