= Kanami (given name) =

- Gender: Female

Origin
- Origin: Japanese
- Meaning: Different meanings depending on the kanji used

Kanami (written: 佳南, 佳奈美 or 夏菜美) is a feminine Japanese given name. Notable people with the name include:

- Kanami Furukawa (古川 佳奈美; born 1997), Japanese para table tennis player
- Kanami Ishiguri (石栗 奏美; born 2004), Japanese former idol of idol group Ocha Norma
- Kanami Morozuka (諸塚 香奈実; born 1989), Japanese former idol of idol group Nice Girl Project!
- Kanami Nakamaki (中牧 佳南; born 1992), Japanese synchronized swimmer
- Kanami Seki (関 夏菜美; born 2000), Japanese ice hockey player
- Kanami Tashiro (田代 佳奈美; born 1991), Japanese volleyball player
- Kanami Tōno (遠乃 歌波; born 1991), Lead guitarist of Band-Maid
- Kanami Tsujino (辻野かなみ; born 1999), Japanese idol of idol group Chō Tokimeki Sendenbu

== Fictional characters ==
- Kanami (カナミ), a character in the light novel series Log Horizon
- Kanami Eto (衛藤 可奈美), a character in the media franchise Toji no Miko
- Kanami Mashita (真下 かなみ), a character in the video game Persona 4: Dancing All Night
- Kanami Mihara (三原 かなみ), a character in the light novel series Is This a Zombie?
- Kanami Okazaki (岡崎 香奈美), a character in the light novel series So I'm a Spider, So What?
- Kanami Shiomiya (汐宮 香奈美), a character in the visual novel After...
