= Hyakko =

Japanese manga series

- Cover art of the first tankōbon featuring main characters Suzume Saotome, Ayumi Nonomura, Torako Kageyama, and Tatsuki Iizuka

ヒャッコ
- Genre: Comedy, slice of life
- Manga
- Written by: Haruaki Katō
- Published by: Flex Comix
- Magazine: FlexComix Blood (2006-2011); Comix Meteor (2012)
- Original run: July 12, 2006 – 2012 (indefinite hiatus)
- Volumes: 7
- Anime television series
- Directed by: Michio Fukuda
- Produced by: Hiroshi Kawamura; Shouko Nakamura; Tatsuhiro Nitta; Shogo Itsuki
- Written by: Yoshihiko Tomizawa
- Music by: Kenji Fujisawa; Hiromi Mizutani; Yasuharu Takanashi; Tsunku; Kouichi Yuasa
- Studio: Nippon Animation
- Licensed by: NA: Right Stuf Inc.
- Original network: TV Tokyo, TV Aichi, TV Osaka
- Original run: October 1, 2008 – December 24, 2008
- Episodes: 13 + OVA

Hyakko (ヒャッコ; "White Tiger") is a Japanese manga created by Haruaki Katō. It started serialization on Flex Comix's free web comic FlexComix Blood on July 12, 2006. An anime adaptation produced by Nippon Animation was first aired in October 2008 in Japan. An OVA was released on October 17, 2009.

== Plot ==
Hyakko takes place in the high school division of Kamizono Academy (上園学園, Kamizono Gakuen), a fictional gigantic private institution located in Kyūshū, Japan, in which the motto is "to bring up talents of students in all departments and fields". Its storyline focuses on the comedic school life of the four main heroines, Torako Kageyama, Ayumi Nonomura, Tatsuki Iizuka, and Suzume Saotome. As the plot progresses, Torako and her friends gradually begin to learn and interact with their classmates in Class 1–6, in which each student has a unique and extraordinary personality.

== Characters ==
=== Main heroines ===
Clockwise from top: Tatsuki, Suzume, Torako, and Ayumi

Each name of the four main heroines contains a kanji of the Four Symbols in the Chinese constellation.

Torako Kageyama (上下山 虎子, Kageyama Torako)
Voiced by: Fumiko Orikasa
Outgoing and usually the instigator of the pack, she is identifiable by the fact that she does not wear a blazer over her shirt and tie like most other characters. She's a typical trouble-maker, who likes to achieve her objectives in a straightforward and intuitive manner and doesn't really seem to mind other people's circumstances. Because she was absent during the first few days of school, she was unwittingly assigned as a member of the discipline committee. She has an older brother Kitsune, whom she apparently holds in very low regard, and an older sister Oniyuri. It is later revealed that Torako is actually a half sister of Kitsune and Oniyuri. Torako used to live with her biological mother until she died of a disease when Torako was attending elementary school. She was then brought to her father's family by him, a decision to which Torako and her stepmother disapproved at first. Due to this reason, she does not have a good relationship with her current family. So much so that she runs away from her home whenever she has a quarrel with her family. However, Kitsune explains that it is always her half-sister Oniyuri's kindness that brings Torako back to the family. She's Suzume's childhood friend. Despite her tendency to skip classes, she still receives above average grades in tests as she is actually quite intelligent. She's 164 cm tall and her three sizes are 81-55-82. Her name contains a kanji of tiger (虎, tora) and the first kanji letter of her name (上) can be pronounced as 'Ue' (West), thus revealing her name's relationship with White Tiger of the West (白虎).
Tatsuki Iizuka (伊井塚 龍姫, Iizuka Tatsuki)
Voiced by: Michiko Neya
Daughter to the corporate president of E-lectra, one of the biggest electronics companies in Japan. She lives in a modest looking house with a housemaid, separate from her parents due to her father's work. Ever the classy one, she tends to use honorific speech even towards her closest friends and is often annoyed by Torako's mischief. Nonetheless, she has the tendency of ending up being taken along, forcefully or otherwise, with the other main heroines over the resulting shenanigans. Her name contains a kanji of dragon (龍, tatsu) and the first kanji letter of her name (伊) is pronounced as 'I' (East), thus revealing her name's relationship with Azure Dragon of the East (青龍).
Suzume Saotome (早乙女 雀, Saotome Suzume)
Voiced by: Yurika Ochiai
Suzume has been Torako's close friend since the middle school. She is usually very quiet but possesses monstrous strength and huge appetite. Despite her superior athletic ability, able to best her homeroom teacher in a one on one dodgeball match, she is in distress for looking childish and not feminine enough. In fact, she does not wear a bra and does admire Tatsuki for wearing underwears for grown ups. She also cannot swim. She seems to have no sense of shame and her behavior is very unpredictable, which often throws her friends off balance. Whenever Torako runs away from her home, Suzume always accompanies her. Her name contains a kanji of sparrow (雀, suzume) and the first kanji letter of her name (早) is pronounced as 'Sa' (South), thus revealing her name's relationship with Vermillion Bird of the South (朱雀).
Ayumi Nonomura (能乃村 歩巳, Nonomura Ayumi)
Voiced by: Aya Hirano
Popular among boys for having a large bust and a naive personality, her photos are always in high demand. Due to her extreme shyness, she has had trouble making friends ever since the middle school and is most often the victim of practical jokes and mischief by others. From meeting Torako and the others Ayumi has then become more extroverted and out spoken but still keeps her shy nature intact. Ayumi also tends to run into Torako's older brother, Kitsune, resulting in him either being rarely nice to her or saying something perverted. Her three sizes are 90-56-85. Her name contains a kanji of snake (巳, mi) and the first kanji letter of her name (能) is pronounced as 'No' (North), thus revealing her name's relationship with Black Tortoise of the North (玄武).

=== Class 1-6 ===
The following characters are classmates of the four main heroines:

Nene Andō (杏藤 子々, Andō Nene)
Voiced by: Fujita Masayo
President of Class 1-6, she often attempts to participate in activities above and beyond her call of duty in hope of paving her way to becoming the future head of the student council. Openly bisexual, she is known for frequent sexual harassment, though she usually targets other females more than males. She takes a particular liking to Torako as well as Ayumi and doesn't really seem to mind being called a pervert. She has an older brother, who has a similar personality.
Ushio Makunouchi (幕之内 潮, Makunouchi Ushio)
Voiced by: Yūko Kaida
With a personality that doesn't conform well with authorities and the habit of wearing T-shirts instead of the standard shirt and tie, Ushio is speculated to be a juvenile delinquent although she firmly denies being one. She likes pudding as well as cats and is tone deaf as revealed when she first went to Karaoke with Torako. She has an older brother. She has often been seen in the company of Minato Oba, despite their clashing personalities.
Koma Kobayashi (古囃 独楽, Kobayashi Koma)
Voiced by: Hiroko Igarashi
Often spotted alongside Yanagi Kyōgoku taking photographs of students and then selling them for profit, she is identifiable for wearing a large number of small decorative accessories. She speaks Kansai ben for no apparent reason. She has a younger brother and two younger sisters.
Chie Suzugazaki (涼ヶ崎 知恵, Suzugazaki Chie)
Voiced by: Yui Horie
Befitting the stereotype of a scientist and an engineer, this girl with long braided hair wears glasses and more often than not white lab coat over her uniform. She is a member of the robotics club, and her hobby is creating grotesque robots. Her desire is to work for the E-lectra Corporation in the future.
Inori Tsubomiya (蕾家 祈, Tsubomiya Inori)
Voiced by: Satomi Sato
Despite being actually quite pretty, her apparent lack of know-how for doing her own make-up means most of her face is not really visible as it is hidden behind her long hair, creating an image akin to that of a stereotypical female ghost in Japanese horror videos. She has a younger sister named Iori.
Minato Ōba (大場 湊兎, Ōba Minato)
Voiced by: Asuka Nakase
Minato is a tall, blonde girl with a tanned complexion reminiscent of the Ganguro style, and also has a more developed bust than the other girls. Despite her mature appearance, she has a very child-like personality which causes her to become teary-eyed over the most trivial of matters. She also maintains an unusual level of childish innocence, causing her to interpret things differently than the other students and at times be almost helpless doing the simplest of tasks. When she receives help from other students, she will persistently and excessively try to return the favor back to the person usually well beyond the norm, and almost completely attaching to them. She is often seen in the company of Ushio Makunouchi, often hanging on her or giving her trouble with her childish personality.
Tōma Kazamatsuri (風茉莉 冬馬, Kazamatsuri Tōma)
Voiced by: Hōko Kuwashima
Tōma is a bookworm and wears glasses. She tends to be a loner who prefers sleeping on the bench by herself in a quiet and beautiful garden for solitude introspection. Although she is easily annoyed by Torako's interference and she seems to dislike Torako on the surface, she is actually a good friend of Torako. She and Torako made a promise of becoming mutual friends when they made a visit to the Kamizono Academy and met each other by chance. The OVA implies she may have a deeper (possibly romantic) affection towards Torako. Tōma has an older sister.
Hitsugi Nikaidō (弐街道 火継, Nikaidō Hitsugi)
Voiced by: Mana Ogawa
Hitsugi is an 11-year-old girl who transferred from the elementary division of the school for her being a mathematics and science prodigy. However, she is not very good at subjects that require memorization. She is very vulnerable to jokes, even the most boring ones. Her favorite snack is Yōkan. She refers to herself with the masculine pronoun boku (僕), a rare occurrence among females.

=== Upper classmates ===
Shishimaru Sengoku (戦国 獅々丸, Sengoku Shishimaru)
Voiced by: Kenji Takahashi
Shishimaru is a second-year student, and a member of the Kendo club, who has a crush on Torako. One of the Four Deities of Kamizono. Like most other characters in the series, his first name makes reference to an animal, in his case, the Lion (Shishi), while his surname, as with the other Deities, references to historical eras in Japan.
Yanagi Kyōgoku (京極 柳, Kyōgoku Yanagi)
Voiced by: Atsushi Kousaka
Yanagi is Shishimaru's friend. Just like Koma, his hobby is to profit by selling photographs of students that he has taken. He was given a nickname "Photoshop".
Kitsune Kageyama (上下山 狐, Kageyama Kitsune)
Voiced by: Hiroyuki Yoshino
Torako's older brother, who has been bullying his sister since childhood. Among the students, Kitsune is known to be an 'Extreme Sadist'. Despite being Torako's brother, he seems to have no resemblance to her in terms of both appearance and personality. Denote Master Servant relationship. He wears a safety pin on his left ear like an earring contrasted by the silver clip Torako wears and a silver bell Oniyuri wears both on their left ears. Because of his Extreme Sadism personality and practice, he views Ayumi to be the perfect target of torment, as he often lifts up her skirt or asks if he can. He seems to prefer torturing her and Torako. He and Ayumi also tend to run into each other randomly, with Kitsune either doing something nice to her(such as giving her his fox mask at the festival or splitting an ice cream with her) or saying something perverted. However, one can't deny that his usual pace gets disrupted when it comes to Ayumi. It is stated that whenever he torments Torako, Suzume doesn't help because Kitsune bribes her with snacks, thus Suzume likes him.
Oniyuri Kageyama (上下山 鬼百合, Kageyama Oniyuri)
Voiced by: Hiroko Kasahara
Torako's older sister. She is the head of the student council, and excels others in every ways. Despite being strict to her younger sister, she is actually being extremely overprotective of Torako. Nene has a great admiration for Oniyuri as she wants to also become the head of the student council in the future.

=== Teachers ===
Kyōichirō Amagasa (傘 叶一狼, Amagasa Kyōichirō)
Voiced by: Keiji Fujiwara
He is the teacher in charge of class 1-6. He is considered as a delinquent teacher by the students. He is a heavy smoker and is often seen smoking in the school. Although he's doing his best to maintain cynical personality, he is easily influenced by other students.
Taiga Nishizono (西園 大河, Nishizono Taiga)
Voiced by: Chafurin
Taiga is the school's principal, whose face has not been revealed yet as it has always been shadowed by a backlight. He is portrayed as a middle-aged gentleman with a mustache.

=== Other supporting characters ===
Yuki Yagi (八木 ユキ, Yagi Yuki)
Voiced by: Yuki Gotō
Yuki is Hitsugi's friend, who attends the elementary division of Kamizono Academy. Her brother is in the Academy's high-school. They appear together in a photo on a New Year's greeting card sent to Tatsuki, glimpsed in episode 6.

== Media ==
=== Manga ===
Hyakko began as a manga series written and drawn by Haruaki Katō and began its serialization in FlexComixBlood. Currently, six volumes have been published by Flex Comix in Japan. As of March 20, 2012, the series is currently on hiatus.

=== Anime ===
Directed by Michio Fukuda, and written by Yoshihiko Tomizawa, an anime adaptation was produced by Nippon Animation. The anime series consisted of 13 episodes and initially aired in Japan between October 1 and December 31, 2008. The show was broadcast on TV Aichi, TV Osaka, and TV Tokyo. An OVA was released on October 17, 2009. Right Stuf Inc. licensed the series in North America and released it on DVD under their Lucky Penny label on April 2, 2013. The opening theme is "Barefaced Rock" (スッピンロック; Suppin Rokku) by Mana Ogawa whilst the ending theme is "Namida Namida Namida" (涙 NAMIDA ナミダ; lit Tears Tears Tears) by Aya Hirano. The insert song and ending theme for the OVA is "Gakuen Seikatsu" (学園生活; lit. Campus Life) by Mana Ogawa and Fumiko Orikasa.

==== Episode list ====
No.	Title	Original release date
1	"Coming Across Torako"; Transliteration: "Torako Aimamieru" (Japanese: 虎子相まみえる)	October 1, 2008
While Ayumi is looking for a way to her classroom, she encounters Tatsuki on her way. Shortly after, they see Torako and Suzume leaping down from a second floor out of a window. After joining together as a group, they heads toward the classroom. About midway through the walk, they find an abandoned school building and accidentally break one of its window. A school teacher, Mr. Amagasa, discovers their act, but Torako gives him a quick punch to stun him. Although they eventually reach the classroom, it later turns out that Mr. Amagasa was teacher in charge of class 1-6.
2	"You Cannot Catch a Cub of a Tiger Without Entering a Tiger Den"; Transliteration: "Koketsu ni Irazunba Koji o Ezu" (Japanese: 虎穴に入らずんば虎子を得ず)	October 8, 2008
Ayumi, Tatsuki, Torako and Suzume are looking for a school club to join. They try out several sports clubs together, but Torako ruins every attempt as she pulls various pranks on Tatsuki.
3	"A Tiger at the Front Gate, Another Tiger at the School Gate / A Paper Tiger"; Transliteration: "Zenmon no Tora Kōmon mo Tora / Hariko no Tora" (Japanese: 前門の虎 校門も虎/張子の虎)	October 15, 2008
While Torako and Suzume are having a conversation together in the morning, they encounter Nene on their way. Torako is informed by her that she was involuntarily decided to be a member of the class discipline committee. On the next day morning, she is assigned a duty of checking the student's dress code. Later Torako and her friends discover that Nene is actually quite keen on the female students. In the second part of the episode, Torako and Suzume discovers a grotesque robot made by Chie, who is a member of the robotics club. Later, Torako and her friends are invited to the robotics club room and they learn about Chie's dream of becoming a robotics engineer.
4	"Drink Like a Cow, Eat Like a Horse and a Tiger / A Tiger is a Companion of Another Tiger"; Transliteration: "Gyūin Bashoku Torashoku / Tora wa Torazure" (Japanese: 牛飲馬食虎食/虎は虎連れ)	October 22, 2008
Torako and her friends go to the school cafeteria together. On the way, Torako teaches Ayumi about the 'Combo Card' which gives an extra portion of a meal. Torako pulls a prank on her by making her accidentally to order a noodle with extra large portion. Tatsuki is offended by Torako's mischievous behavior, since Suzume's extraordinary strength needed to eat large portions of food to fuel her extraordinary strength is revealed. In the second part of the episode, Torako and her friends are in an art class, where students learn to draw each other. Ayumi and Torako takes seductive poses on the floor, while Koma passionately snaps their photographs with her digital camera. Later, Koma sells some of her photographs to a student for profit.
5	"The Friendship Depends on the Tiger / You Need to Follow a Person's Example to Learn about the Person, You Need to Fight with a Tiger to Learn about the Tiger"; Transliteration: "Aien Koen / Hito ni wa Soute miyo Tora to wa Tatakatte miyo" (Japanese: 合縁虎縁/人には沿うてみよ、虎とは闘ってみよ)	November 5, 2008
A new character, Yanagi, is introduced. Just like Koma, he makes profits from selling photographs of the students. When Shishimaru looks at Yanagi's photograph of Ayumi by chance, he is instantly infatuated with the photograph. On his way, he encounters Ayumi and confesses his love to her. However, it is later revealed that Shishimaru has actually asked Ayumi to tell Torako about his love for her. In the second part of the episode, Torako and Ushio skip the class together and spends their time together in the downtown and develops a friendship with each other.
6	"A Good Neighborhood Tiger"; Transliteration: "Mukou Sangen Ryōgawa ni Tora" (Japanese: 向こう三軒 両側に虎)	November 12, 2008
Torako, Suzume, and Ayumi visits Tatsuki's home without informing her in advance. Although Tatsuki is caught off guard and is quite surprised their visit, she gladly invites them to her home. Meanwhile, Tatsuki's housemaid is relieved that Tatuski has made some good friends in the school as she had trouble making friends in the past. Tatsuki's friends are invited to the dinner and they are impressed by her housemaids' kindness.
7	"A Fox Finally Meets a Tiger / A Fox That Provoked the Tiger's Wrath"; Transliteration: "Koko de Atta ga Hyakunenme / Tora no Ikari o Kau Kitsune" (Japanese: 狐虎で会ったが百年目/虎の怒りを買う狐)	November 19, 2008
Koma and Yanagi are hiding in bushes and taking photographs of students secretly. Meanwhile, Kitsune decides to help them out and pulls a skirt prank on Ayumi, so that Koma and Yanagi can take 'better' photographs of her. Then the three students encounter Shishimaru, who wants to have photographs of Torako, but he thinks taking photographs without the consent of the subject is a despicable act. The three comes out of bushes and politely asks Torako for photograph. Suddenly, Torako is surprised to see Kitsune, who turns out to be her brother. In the second part of the episode, Torako complains to her friends about all the bad memories she had with her brother in the past. On the next day, Kitsune brings Shishimaru to Torako's lunch. Kitsune decides to pull another prank on Torako by secretly putting a whole bottle of spice in Torako's ramen, which forces Torako to switch her meal with Shishimaru, bringing an unintended effect on their relationship.
8	"An Arrow Stuck on a Tiger / I Sketched a Tiger, But It Turned Out to Be a Cat"; Transliteration: "Tora ni Tatsu Ya / Tora o Egai te Neko ni Ruisuru" (Japanese: 虎に立つ矢/虎を描いて猫に類する)	November 26, 2008
Inori is in distress for not being able to make friends as she has trouble speaking out loud and her face covered by a long hair freaks out other students. Torako then decides to help her out by asking her friends to renovate her face, so it can give a better impression on the other students. Meanwhile, Torako goes around the classes and changes the classmates' and teacher in charge for her class's hairstyles as she pleases. After the make p is done, the classmates are amazed at Inori's new face. However, on the next day, Inori's appearance reverts to her ordinary form, which disappoints her friends; she later explains that she is not good enough to do the make up every morning.
9	"A Sympathy is not Meant for a Tiger / Suzume, It's Time for You to Get It"; Transliteration: "Nasake wa Tora no Tamera na zu / Suzume yo, Saraba Ataeraren" (Japanese: 情けは虎の為ならず / 雀よ、さらば与えられん)	December 3, 2008
Minato drops and loses her only coin in front of the vending machines. When She loses her hope of retrieving the coin and begins to cry, Torako and Ayumi happens to meet her. Torako buys her a can of drink, so that she would stop crying. After receiving a favor from Torako, Minato persistently tries to return the favor by constantly offering any helps, which eventually annoys her to the great extent. Torako devises various plans of keeping a reasonable distance from Minato, but all of her plans fail at the end. In the second part of the episode, Suzume walks around the school and receives foods and drinks from her friends as a goodwill. Later, Torako and Ayumi is amazed at the amount of gifts that Suzume collected around the school.
10	"A Wing for a Tiger"; Transliteration: "Tora ni Tsubasa" (Japanese: 虎に翼)	December 10, 2008
When Tōma is passing away her time on the top of the school building, Torako approaches her and tries to have a talk. Tōma, however, rejects and makes a statement that she dislikes Torako, while Torako thinks Tōma is too boring. Later, Tōma encounters Torako's friends in school and she decides with certainty that all of them are strange in one way or another. In another day on the top of the school building, she looks back upon the past when she met Torako in Kamizono High School as a visiting middle school student and made their friendship. In the afternoon, Torako invites Tōma for a lunch along with Ayumi, Suzume, and Tatsuki and Tōma is surprised at how easily she blended into the group.
11	"Escape from the Tiger's Mouth"; Transliteration: "Kōko o Nogareru" (Japanese: 虎口を逃れる)	December 17, 2008
When a colleague has to rush home to care for a sick child, their teacher in charge of class 1-6 during Home Room time declares they should do their own revision, which moves to the gym to get an early start on the next period's PE class. Meanwhile, Yanagi and friends kibbutz from the balcony, with Yanagi hoping to get easily marketed photos of the girls in their gym clothes. The time in the gym turns into a deadly game of dodge ball, with most of the class laid out by brutal throws to the face. To bring peace, Torako suggests trial by champion; Suzume vs. Teacher in charge of class 1-6.
12	"First with Princess, Second with Prince, and Third with Torako / A Demon's Concern about Torako"; Transliteration: "Ichi Hime Ni Tarō San Torako / Torako Yue ni Mayou Onigokoro" (Japanese: 一姫二太郎三虎子 / 虎子故に迷う鬼心)	December 24, 2008
All of the girls learn about Torako's past with her two step siblings once Torako argues with her sister out in the hallway. Torako finally gets Touma to talk to her.
13	"Four People Can Create a Tiger Out of Nothing"; Transliteration: "Yonin Tora o Nasu" (Japanese: 四人虎を為す)	December 31, 2008
Set prior to the events of the series, everyone gets ready for the first day of high school. Meanwhile, Torako and Suzume decide to run away from home.
OVA	"Hyakko Extra"; Transliteration: "Hyakko Ekusutora" (ヒャッコエクストラ)	October 17, 2009
When Tōma's favourite hang out place goes bankrupt, Torako decides to take her to a nearby cake store. To Tōma's surprise, Torako orders them every cake on the menu.

=== Visual novel ===
A visual novel based on the anime named Hyakko: Yorozuya Jikenbo! was released on April 9, 2009, for PlayStation 2. It was published by 5pb., and it was released in two editions: regular and limited.
