= Gokujō!! Mecha Mote Iinchō =

Japanese manga series

極上!!めちゃモテ委員長
- Genre: Romantic comedy, School life
- Manga
- Written by: Tomoko Nishimura
- Published by: Shogakukan
- Magazine: Ciao
- Original run: June 30, 2006 – January 2014
- Volumes: 17
- Anime television series
- Directed by: Harume Kosaka
- Written by: Natsuko Takahashi
- Music by: Jun'ichi Igarashi; Kōtarō Nakagawa
- Studio: SynergySP, Shogakukan Music & Digital Entertainment
- Original network: TV Tokyo, AT-X
- Original run: April 4, 2009 – March 27, 2010
- Episodes: 51
- Anime television series

Gokujō! Mecha Mote Iinchō Second Collection
- Directed by: Masatsugu Arakawa
- Written by: Natsuko Takahashi
- Music by: Jun'ichi Igarashi; Kōtarō Nakagawa
- Studio: SynergySP
- Original network: TV Tokyo, AT-X
- Original run: April 3, 2010 – April 10, 2011
- Episodes: 51

Gokujō!! Mecha Mote Iinchō (極上!!めちゃモテ委員長; "The Best!! Extremely Cool Class President") is a Japanese shōjo manga series written and illustrated by Tomoko Nishimura. It was serialized in Shogakukan's Ciao magazine from January 2006 to January 2014.

The manga has been adapted into an anime produced by SynergySP and Shogakukan Music & Digital Entertainment, which was originally broadcast in Japan on TV Tokyo and AT-X from April 4, 2010, to April 4, 2011.

== Plot ==
Mimi Kitagami (北神未海, Kitagami Mimi) (voiced by Mana Ogawa) is a kind, level-headed girl who aims to be the best, coolest student council president of her high school class. However, three troublemaking boys are always causing her grief, and she has a one-sided crush on one of the boys, Ushio Tōjō.

== Games ==
All Gokujō!! Mecha Mote Iinchō video games were published by Konami for the Nintendo DS and none of them was released outside Japan.

Title	Developer	Release date	Japanese	Notes
Gokujō!! Mecha Mote Iinchō: Mecha Mote Days, Hajimemasu wa!		December 4, 2008	極上!!めちゃモテ委員長 めちゃモテDays,はじめますわっ!	Released before the anime adaptation.
Gokujō!! Mecha Mote Iinchō: Girls Motekawa Box		July 30, 2009	極上!!めちゃモテ委員長 ガールズ『モテ・カワ』BOX	
Gokujō!! Mecha Mote Iinchō: MM Town de Miracle Change!	HuneX	December 10, 2009	極上!!めちゃモテ委員長 MMタウンでミラクルチェンジ!	
Gokujō!! Mecha Mote Iinchō: MM My Best Friend!	HuneX	November 25, 2010	極上!!めちゃモテ委員長MMマイベストフレンド!	Nintendo DSi enhanced.

== Other adaptations ==
The anime was also adapted into a stage play.

== Awards and nominations ==
Mimi Kitakami (voiced by Mana Ogawa) and Eve (Ibu) Himuro (voiced by Risako Sugaya from Berryz Kobo) were nomitated for the 2010 Billboard Japan Music Award in the Independent Artist of the Year category. The Billboard Japan Music Award for Independent Artist of the Year is intended to acknowledge performers who have reached No. 1 on the Billboard Japan Indie chart during the year.
