= Mana Ogawa =

Japanese musical artist

- 小川 真奈
- Born: July 2, 1993 (age 33); Saitama Prefecture, Japan
- Occupations: Actress; voice actress; singer
- Years active: 2006–present
- Agent: Space Craft
- Height: 160 cm (5 ft 3 in)
- Musical career
- Genres: J-Pop; Anison
- Instruments: Vocals; guitar
- Years active: 2007–present

Mana Ogawa (小川 真奈, Ogawa Mana; born July 2, 1993) is a Japanese actress, voice actress and singer. Her debut album 1 Teenage Blues (①ティーネイジ ブルース, Ichi Tīneija Burūzu) was released on July 21, 2010. The album charted at No.100 on the Oricon album charts. She was previously a soloist under NICE GIRL Project! and was a member of Canary Club CAN'S division with Ayumi Takada from 2007 until its hiatus in 2012.

== Voice roles ==
- The Best!! Extremely Cool Class President (Mimi Kitagami)
- Hyakko (Hitsugi Nikaidō)
- Sasami: Magical Girls Club (Sasami Iwakura)
- Let's Make a Mug Too (Mami Koizumi)

== Stage roles ==
- Lucky Star ≈ On Stage (Tsukasa Hiiragi)
- New Lobo the King of Currumpaw (Blanca)

== Discography ==
=== Singles ===
as herself

- 2008: "Suppin' Rock (スッピンロック, Suppin Rokku)

as Mimi Kitagami (CV Mana Ogawa) with MM Gakuen Gasshōbu

- 2009: "Daisuki ni Nare!" (大好きになれっ！; "Become in Love!")
- 2010: "Genki ni Nare! (元気になれっ！; "Become Energetic!")
- 2010: "Kimi ga Shuyaku sa!" (君が主役さっ！; "You're the Star!")
- 2010: "Mecha Motetai!" (めちゃモテたいっ！; "I Want to Become Extremely Popular!")
- 2010: "Oshare My Dream" (おしゃれ マイドリーム, Oshare Mai Dorīmu; "Stylish, My Dream")

=== Albums ===
as herself

- 2010: 1 Teenage Blues

as Mimi Kitagami (CV Mana Ogawa) with MM Gakuen Gasshōbu

- 2010: Mecha Mote Iinchō Mecha Hit Kyokushū 1 (めちゃモテ委員長 めちゃヒット曲集①; Extremely Fashionable Class President! Extreme Hit Song Collection 1)

=== EPs ===
as herself

- 2020: Moment
