= Nice Girl Project! =

Japanese idol collective

- Origin: Tokyo, Japan
- Genres: J-pop
- Years active: 2007–2015
- Labels: TNX; Up-Front Group
- Spinoffs: The Possible; Canary Club; Tokky; Mana Ogawa; Nice Girl Project! Kenshusei; Nice Girl Mu; GTT Club; MM Gakuen Gasshoubu; Kafumio; Peach; Karen; Chusuke Suzuka
- Website: www.tnx.cc/nicegirl

Nice Girl Project! (NICE GIRL プロジェクト！), often shortened to NGP, was a Japanese idol musical collective formed by Tanabe Agency, Space Craft Group, Up-Front Group, and TNX. The project was created by Tsunku and launched on October 15, 2007. Nice Girl Project! began its full-time activities in April 2008.

Before its disbandment, the project's roster consisted of groups The Possible, Canary Club; soloists Tokky and Mana Ogawa; and the trainee group, Nice Girl Project! Kenshusei. The project also consisted of groups Nice Girl Mu (ナイスガールμ), GTT Club (GTT倶楽部), and MM Gakuen Gasshoubu (MM学園 合唱部); and soloists Kafumio (何文櫻), Peach (Momoko Otsuka), and Karen Kato prior to their disbandment or departure.

Nice Girl Project! was dropped as an act in 2015 and all information and social media was removed from TNX's official website. In the same year, one of their flagship groups, The Possible, was renamed "Ciao Bella Cinquetti" and transferred to Up-Front Works.

== History ==
In 2007, Tsunku created Nice Girl Project! a collaboration between Tanabe Agency, Space Craft Group, Up-Front Group, and TNX, where TNX founded as a base to manage activities. Comparing it as a "twin" project to the musical collective Hello! Project, the project's first founding groups were The Possible, trainees from Hello! Project's trainee program Hello Pro! Eggs; and Canary Club from Space Craft Agency. Tsunku had intended on Nice Girl Project! having their own television program.

In 2015, Nice Girl Project!'s activities ended, with all information and social media from Nice Girl Project! removed from TNX's official website. The Possible was renamed "Ciao Bella Cinquetti" and transferred to Up-Front Works.

== Discography ==
=== DVDs ===
- [2007.12.19] あぁ 女子合唱部～栄光のかけら～ (Aa Joshi Gasshou bu ~Eikou no Kake ra~)
- [2008.02.28] NICE GIRL プロジェクト！ THE ポッシボーとキャナァーリ倶楽部の秘密 (NICE GIRL Project! THE Possible to Canaria Club no Himitsu)
- [2008.05.17] THE ポッシボー 初単独ライブ2008春～横浜☆恋のキャッチボー～ (THE Possible Hatsu Tandoku Live 2008 Haru ~Yokohama ☆ Koi no Catchable~)
- [2008.05.24] キャナァーリ倶楽部ライブ2008春 ～横浜キャナリアダイヤモンド～ (Canaria Club Live 2008 Haru ~Yokohama Canaria Diamond~)
- [2008.12.21] 2008夏 ナイスガールプロジェクト！エモーショナルライブ～ミラクル セクシー ダイナマイト～ (2008 Natsu Nice Girl Project! Emotional Live ~Miracle Sexy Dynamite~)
- [2009.01.30] THE ポッシボー 2008秋～SEXY ジェネレーション～ (THE Possible 2008 Fall ~SEXY Generation~)
- [2009.02.27] キャナァーリ倶楽部 2008秋～渋谷でキラキララ～ (Canary Club 2008 Fall ~Shibuya de Kirakirara~)
- [2009.07.04] THE ポッシボーライブ2009春～幸せの形 感謝の形～ (THE Possible Spring 2009 ~Shiawase no Katachi Kansha no Katachi~)
- [2009.12.25] ナイスガールプロジェクト！2009 SUMMER LIVE～ナイスバケーション！～ (NICE GIRL Project! 2009 SUMMER LIVE ~Nice Vacation!~)
- [2010.02.17] めちゃモテ文化祭ライブ (Mecha Mote Bunkasai Live)
