= Tsunku =

Japanese singer and record producer (born 1968)

- つんく♂
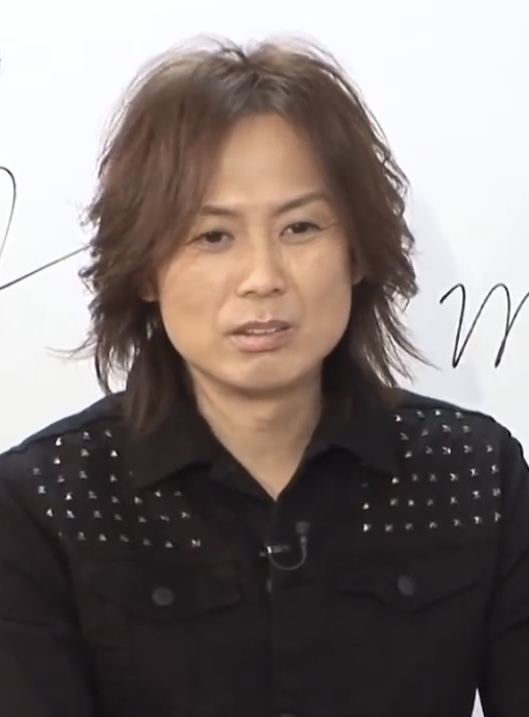
- Tsunku in 2013
- Born: Mitsuo Terada; October 29, 1968 (age 57); Higashiosaka, Osaka, Japan
- Occupations: Songwriter; vocalist; talent manager; record producer; musician; actor; television presenter
- Spouse: Kanako Idemitsu (m. 2006)
- Children: 3
- Musical career
- Origin: Higashiosaka, Osaka Prefecture, Japan
- Genres: Various forms of pop (electronica, synthpop, R&B, big band, video game music, disco, etc.) and rock (hard rock, funk rock, pop rock, etc.)
- Years active: 1988–present
- Labels: Zetima; Piccolo Town; hachama
- Formerly of: Sharam Q
- Website: Tsunku.net

Mitsuo Terada (寺田 光男, Terada Mitsuo; born October 29, 1968), known professionally as Tsunku (つんく♂), is a Japanese singer, record producer, and songwriter. He was the lead singer of the rock band Sharam Q.

As a songwriter, Tsunku is the primary producer for Morning Musume and other Hello! Project acts, such as Coconuts Musume, Berryz Kobo, Cute, V-u-den, Aya Matsuura, and Maki Goto. He has also produced music for artists such as EE Jump and Sonim. Aside from musical acts, Tsunku has also produced soundtracks for anime and video game series such as Rhythm Heaven and ClassicaLoid. The total sales of the singles he has written exceed 37.9 million copies, making him the fifth best-selling lyricist in Japan.

== History ==
As a member of Sharam Q, he wrote and released “Single Bed" and "Zurui Onna", which both entered the top 10 in the charts, and remain popular songs in Japan today, often featuring on top karaoke charts.

Tsunku later worked with Nintendo and J.P.ROOM to create the music video game, Rhythm Tengoku. It was released for the Game Boy Advance exclusively in Japan on August 3, 2006, and later as an arcade machine on September 20, 2007. He also worked on Rhythm Tengoku Gold (Released in the US as Rhythm Heaven and in Europe as Rhythm Paradise) for the Nintendo DS, Minna no Rhythm Tengoku (Rhythm Heaven Fever in the US, Beat the Beat: Rhythm Paradise in Europe) for the Wii, Rhythm Tengoku: The Best Plus (Rhythm Heaven Megamix in the US, Rhythm Paradise Megamix in Europe) for the Nintendo 3DS, and Rhythm Tengoku Miracle Stars (Rhythm Heaven Groove in the US, Rhythm Paradise Groove in Europe) for Nintendo Switch.

On October 1, 2006, it was announced that Tsunku had created a new company called TNX consisting of singers such as Ami Tokito.

On September 26, 2007, Tsunku released a compilation album with the temporary title of "Sharam Q ~ Morning Musume" ~Tsunku 15 Years in Entertainment Commemoration Album~, containing songs by both Sharam Q and Morning Musume, and another one on December 5, 2007 titled Tsunku Best Work Collection, containing songs sung by Tsunku himself.

== Personal life ==
In June 2006, Tsunku married Kanako Idemitsu (出光 加奈子), a 25-year-old former model from Fukuoka. The couple have fraternal twins (a boy and a girl—the girl best known by her debut name, Hotzmic) born in 2008 and a second daughter, born in 2011.

In March 2014, Tsunku announced on his blog that he had laryngeal cancer, which he found out after having throat surgery due to an unspecified condition. He also stated that he has been seeking treatment for it. On April 4, 2015, Tsunku revealed that he had his vocal cords removed as part of his cancer treatment.

== Artistic influences ==
As his musical influences he cites The Beatles, Japanese popular music (especially kayōkyoku), American and European hits being played on the radio when he was a schoolboy, disco acts such as Chic, Kool & the Gang and Earth, Wind & Fire, and bands like Duran Duran and The Power Station.

== Music composition and lyrical works ==
=== Hello! Project ===
Tsunku is responsible for majority of the musical composition and lyrics in Hello! Project, noticeably for Morning Musume where all of their singles have ranked in the Oricon Weekly Singles Top 5 (excluding "Morning Coffee" and "Mikan"). Arranging is typically left to outside parties with track records in arranging popular anime and game music.

His works are mainly pop-oriented with catchy melodies and romantic, idealistic and sometimes even humorous lyrics, the latter in particular often being pitched to appeal to a young audience. However, many of the female vocalists who perform his songs have a large, dedicated fan base composed of older male wota, as well as male fans who are not wota, both of whom are usually in their twenties and thirties, and occasionally older. Some of his works in the late 2000s were particularly mature and hard-hitting (considering the ages of the girls singing them), such as the Morning Musume singles "Kanashimi Twilight, "Onna ni Sachi Are" and "Resonant Blue". Although his own work as a soloist and in Sharam Q tends to lean towards pop-rock, he is best known for working with various arrangers to create highly melodic, richly-textured sequencer-driven electronic dance music which often features synthesizers, as well as guitar riffs and solos which sometimes hint at hard rock or heavy metal influences (such as in Morning Musume's "Ambitious! Yashinteki de Ii Jan" and Cute's "Forever Love"). Typical vocal arrangements in the songs he writes for Hello! Project's groups tend to revolve around the members taking turns at singing lines and sometimes even small parts of lines in succession, building up to a chorus in which most (if not all) members sing in unison rather than using vocal harmonies; any harmonies that are present in the songs are often sung by other people (including Tsunku himself, who records his backing vocals so as to appear to sing "along with" the girls on their studio recordings during key parts of songs such as during choruses and on certain phrases, in a voice an octave lower than theirs). However, there have been some exceptions, such as the Morning Musume songs "Morning Coffee", "Furusato", "Memory Seishun no Hikari", "Love Machine" and "I Wish", where most (if not all) of the backing vocals were sung by the group's members themselves. Furthermore, in the past few years, it has become even more common for members of Hello! Project's groups to provide the backing vocals for their songs themselves.

Recent years have also seen Hello! Project moving in a new direction musically, with prominent elements of dubstep and electro being incorporated into much of their recorded output, resulting in songs which seem at times to be almost experimental in style, at least by idol music standards.

=== Nice Girl Project! ===
Tsunku is also involved in Nice Girl Project! (NICE GIRL プロジェクト!).

=== 2011–present ===
As a result of the Japanese earthquake in 2011, Tsunku wrote a song titled Love is Here ~Kibou no Hikari~, dedicated to the victims. Tsunku is one of the many Japanese celebrities who have stepped up to support the victims and their loved ones.

In his memoir, Dakara, Ikiru, which was published in September 2015, it was revealed that he stepped down as Hello! Project's General Manager sometime after Morning Musume's New York concert that happened on October 5, 2014. He still remains involved with Morning Musume as its Sound Producer.

On May 4, 2020, Tsunku was among the 121 members of Up-Front Group to participate in a YouTube telework to support the frontline workers during the COVID-19 pandemic.

During the Nintendo Direct on March 27, 2025, it was revealed that a new entry in the Rhythm Heaven series, titled Rhythm Heaven Groove, was coming to the Nintendo Switch in 2026, where Tsunku was announced to be returning as the game's composer.

== Discography ==
=== Albums ===
#	Title	Release date
1	A Hard Day's Night	December 6, 2000
2	Take 1	February 18, 2004
3	Type2 (タイプ2)	July 13, 2005
4	V3~Seishun Cover~ (V3～青春カバー～)	June 28, 2006
5	"Sharam Q ~ Morning Musume" ~Tsunku 15 Years in Entertainment Commemoration Album~ (「シャ乱Q～モーニング娘。」～つんく♂芸能生活15周年記念アルバム～)	September 26, 2007
6	"Tsunku Best Work Collection" (「つんく♂ベスト作品集」)	December 5, 2007

=== Singles ===
#	Title	Release date
1	"Love ~Dakiatte~" (Love～抱き合って～)	April 28, 1999
2	"Touch Me"	November 3, 1999
3	"Suggoi Ne!" (すっごいね!)	February 27, 2002
4	"Shoppai ne" (しょっぱいね)	September 26, 2012
