= Rhythm Heaven =

Video game series by Nintendo

- North American logo
- Genre: Rhythm
- Developers: Nintendo SPD (2006–2015); Nintendo EPD (2026); TNX
- Publisher: Nintendo
- Creator: Kazuyoshi Osawa
- Producer: Tsunku
- Composers: Tsunku; Masami Yone
- Platforms: Game Boy Advance, Arcade, Nintendo DS, Wii, Nintendo 3DS, Wii U, Nintendo Switch
- Original release: August 3, 2006
- First release: Rhythm Tengoku; August 3, 2006
- Latest release: Rhythm Heaven Groove; July 2, 2026

Rhythm Heaven, (Note: Japanese: リズム天国, Hepburn: Rizumu Tengoku) also known as Rhythm Paradise in PAL regions, is a rhythm game series developed and published by Nintendo and co-developed with TNX Music Recordings. In the games, players play through a collection of rhythm mini-games, each with its own set of rules. The series has released on Nintendo consoles, including the Game Boy Advance, Nintendo DS, Nintendo 3DS, Wii, and Nintendo Switch. The original game, Rhythm Tengoku, was also released in arcades on the Sega Naomi arcade cabinet. The music is mostly composed by Japanese singer Tsunku and Nintendo composer Masami Yone.

== Gameplay ==
In the Rhythm Heaven series, players play through sets of rhythm mini-games known as Rhythm Games. The gameplay focuses on audio cues rather than visual cues to convey information to players. It features a number of unique stages which have their own type of rhythm and gameplay. Players follow the rhythm (in some rhythm games as a character) until the end where they are given a score based on their performance. In most of the Rhythm Heaven games, the games are grouped into sets with 4 to 6 Rhythm Games in total in each set, with 4-5 main stages and 1 "remix" at the end. Each set's last stage is usually a remix of the previous games in the set being played all at once. The games change in turn throughout the remix, which is accompanied by a new song. The later sets contain sequels to most of the Rhythm Games, and the remixes contain more Rhythm Games, not being specific to the set. The objective of each Rhythm Game is to match the rhythm to the game, which the game expects of players which varies from stage to stage. The game primarily relies on audio cues to indicate the rhythm; while it uses visual cues as well, it will sometimes subvert players' expectations with them. Each Rhythm Game usually lasts for 1 to 2 minutes, with rare deviations.

In each stage, the player must attempt to keep with the rhythm throughout the level. Most levels allow the player to practice before attempting to clear the game, the exceptions being the remix stages and some sequel games (namely those that include previously unseen patterns).

At the end of each stage, players are rated one of the three ratings, each based on how well they did in the stages. Getting a "Try Again" rank means that the player has failed and will have to repeat the level. Getting a "OK" rank means that the player played well enough to pass. Getting a "Superb" rank means that the player has not only passed the level, they have done very well in the level. When the player gets a "Superb" rank, they earn a medal which can be used to unlock extra game modes such as Endless Games, and it also allows the player to be eligible for the randomly selected Perfect Campaigns. If a stage is too difficult, the game allows the player to skip levels when players get a "Try Again" rank three times in a row, in most stages.

On some occasions, players are allowed to attempt a Perfect Campaign of a randomly selected stage that they have a "Superb" rank on. If players make any misses in the stage while making the attempt, a chance is lost, and the player must restart the stage from the beginning. Players have three chances to attempt this before it either disappears or moves on to another rhythm game. Players who succeed receive an in-game certificate as well as a gift (varying on the rhythm game).

== Development ==
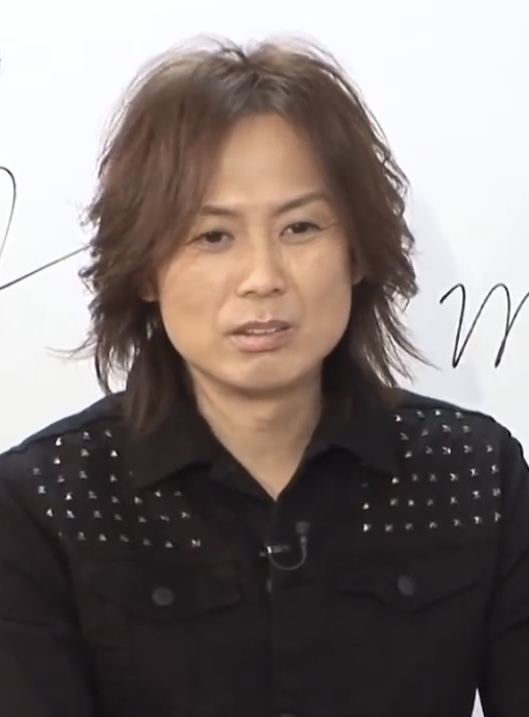
Japanese musician Tsunku has served as the series' producer and composer since its inception.

The first game, Rhythm Tengoku, began development sometime in 2002, under the working title of Rhythm IQ, when Kazuyoshi Osawa, the game programmer, had created a tech demo for the Game Boy Advance where players could play a drum kit, with each button on the console being designated to a different drum. Osawa had previously been involved in the development of the WarioWare series of games. In 2004, Tsunku brought his proposal to Nintendo of a rhythm game that did not rely on visual indicators for its rhythm. Osawa was wary that people would enjoy it due to its lack of a music score as he felt that it might only appeal to a niche audience. It was decided to be released on the GBA due to Osawa's desire for a smaller screen and portability. After the game's release in Japan in 2006, SEGA approached the development team to co-develop a Rhythm Tengoku game for arcades, released on the SEGA NAOMI in 2007. This was due to the popularity of the game with its development staff. Osawa brought this offer to the attention of Nintendo president Satoru Iwata and others who approved of the idea.

During development of the next Rhythm Heaven game for the Nintendo DS, Kazuyoshi Osawa wanted to take advantage of the DS touchscreen. Due to this, the game's development "wasn't easy" for the staff. Since Osawa did not like the idea of using buttons, he considered a control mechanic that involved the touchscreen. Finding the ideal method of control took a lot of effort and time. For example, the ability to touch the edge of the touchscreen was considered, but was determined to be too difficult. The Flick action took them about "two to three months" to research and "six months" to eventually adapt the control into the game.

== Games ==
Release timeline
2006	Rhythm Tengoku
2007
2008	Rhythm Heaven
2009–2010
2011	Rhythm Heaven Fever
2012–2014
2015	Rhythm Heaven Megamix
2016–2025
2026	Rhythm Heaven Groove

The Rhythm Heaven series currently has five entries: Rhythm Tengoku, Rhythm Heaven, Rhythm Heaven Fever, Rhythm Heaven Megamix, and Rhythm Heaven Groove. Each game introduces new concepts and gameplay mechanics.

=== Rhythm Tengoku (2006) ===
Rhythm Tengoku is the first entry to the Rhythm Heaven series. This game was released only in Japan on August 3, 2006 on the Game Boy Advance. There are 48 Rhythm Games in this game, 8 sets of 6, including one Remix per set. The Game Boy Advance version also includes 4 Endless Games (2 of which were adapted from regular Rhythm Games), and 4 Rhythm Toys, extra rhythm-based toys for the player to fiddle around with. The game also got an arcade release on the SEGA Naomi, featuring only the 48 regular Rhythm Games, in addition to bonus "Tempo-Up!" versions of the first 6.

=== Rhythm Heaven (DS) (2008) ===
Rhythm Heaven, known as Rhythm Tengoku Gold in Japan, Rhythm Paradise in PAL regions, and Rhythm World in Korea, is the second entry to the Rhythm Heaven series. This game is the first localized version of the series, releasing in Japan on July 31, 2008, and releasing in North America, Europe, Australia and Korea throughout 2009 on the Nintendo DS. There are 50 Rhythm Games, 10 sets of 5, including 1 remix per set. The game also includes 6 Endless Games (one of which was adapted from a regular Rhythm Game), and 7 Rhythm Toys. Instead of using traditional control methods such as buttons, the game opts to use the DS touch screen as a control method. Players can flick, tap, and slide the stylus on the touch screen to control the game.

=== Rhythm Heaven Fever (2011) ===
Rhythm Heaven Fever, known as Minna No Rhythm Tengoku in Japan, Beat The Beat: Rhythm Paradise in PAL regions, and Rhythm World Wii in Korea, is the third entry to the Rhythm Heaven series, released on the Wii. This game released in Japan on July 21, 2011, and releasing in other countries throughout 2012. This game introduces the concept of holding and pressing two buttons at once; in this case the Wii Remote's A and B buttons. Players alternate pressing either the A button only, pressing both the A and B buttons, or alternating between the two control methods. Similar to the previous game, there are 50 Rhythm Games in total, with 10 of them being remixes. It also has a two-player mode, containing 8 Rhythm Games modified to accommodate a second player. There are 5 Endless Games, including an Endless Remix, 5 two-player Endless Games (one of which as adapted from a regular Rhythm Game), 4 Rhythm Toys, and 5 extra Rhythm Games brought back from Rhythm Tengoku. This game was also later digitally released on the Nintendo Wii U's eShop as a Wii Virtual Console title in 2016.

=== Rhythm Heaven Megamix (2015) ===
Rhythm Heaven Megamix, known as Rhythm Tengoku: The Best+ in Japan, Rhythm Paradise Megamix in PAL regions, and Rhythm Sesang: The Best Plus in Korea, is the fourth entry to the Rhythm Heaven series, released on the Nintendo 3DS. This game was released in Japan on June 11, 2015, and releasing in other countries throughout 2016. This game is a compilation of all of the previous Rhythm Heaven games, including 63 Rhythm Games from the previous three Rhythm Heaven games (18 of which are unlocked through the game's in-game shop), 19 new ones, 12 shortened versions of previous games, 4 Endless Games (one from each previous title and one new), and 10 new Remixes, making for a total of 108 games in all. This game introduces the Score Meter, which makes the game scoring less fixed. The game presents a story mode, which differentiates itself from the traditional Rhythm Heaven format. This game can be controlled with either the buttons and d-pad, or with the touch screen, although the touch controls are simplified from the DS version.

=== Rhythm Heaven Groove (2026) ===
Rhythm Heaven Groove, known as Rhythm Heaven: Miracle Stars in Asia and Rhythm Paradise Groove in PAL regions, is the fifth entry to the Rhythm Heaven series, released on the Nintendo Switch on July 2, 2026. This game features 80 new single-player minigames and 30 multiplayer games.

== Reception ==
Sales and aggregate review scores As of November 2026.
Game	Units sold (in millions)	Metacritic	OpenCritic
Rhythm Tengoku	—	—	—
Rhythm Heaven	3.04	83 (48 reviews)	—
Rhythm Heaven Fever	0.72 (Note: Japanese sales only)	83 (56 reviews)	—
Rhythm Heaven Megamix	1.03	83 (37 reviews)	74% recommend
Rhythm Heaven Groove	2.89	82 (100 reviews)	86% recommend

The Rhythm Heaven series generally received favorable reviews from reviewers and critics. The first three international releases all scored an 83/100 on review aggregation site Metacritic. On the Nintendo DS version, IGN reviewers say that the game is "unlike anything you've ever played, not to mention incredibly fun and just as addictive.". Wired reviewers say that this game that is "exactly the sort of novel, deep, challenging game that people accuse Nintendo of not creating anymore." On the Wii version, Jose Otero from 1Up.com gave the game an A−, stating: "The amount of mileage Nintendo squeezes out of Rhythm Heaven Fever's two-button gameplay is remarkable – more than 50 mini-games including regular stages, rhythm toys, and endless games to play – especially in a time when the kind of games I typically consume require more button inputs." Kyle Hilliard from Game Informer describes the Wii release as a "addictive, original, and often hilarious game." The original release on the Game Boy Advance received an Excellence Prize for Entertainment at the 10th annual Japan Media Arts Festival in 2006. Abigail Kwak from The Gamer considers the series as a whole "so memorable" that they are "still booting up our Wiis to play classics like Rhythm Heaven Fever even to this day." Similarly, Logan Plant from IGN believes that the Rhythm Heaven series is one of the best and weirdest Nintendo franchises, and should be brought back due to there not being an entry since Megamix in 2016.

== Legacy ==
The Rhythm Heaven and WarioWare series have heavily referenced each other, mainly due to Osawa's previous involvement in both of the series.

Several fangames and projects have been created that are based on the Rhythm Heaven series, such as the open-source remix creation tool Heaven Studio, in which players can create custom remixes based on the rhythm mini-games found in the Rhythm Heaven series. However, it was taken down from GitHub and itch.io in 2024 after Nintendo filed a DMCA takedown request.
