= Tanpopo Single V Clips 1 =

2004 compilation DVD by Tanpopo

Video by Tanpopo
- Released: June 16, 2004
- Recorded: 1998–2004
- Genre: Japanese pop
- Label: Zetima
- Producer: Tsunku

Tanpopo Single V Clips 1 (タンポポ シングルＶクリップス①) is a DVD compilation containing promotional videos of Tanpopo songs, including close-up versions and TV commercials as well. It was released on June 16, 2004 on the Zetima label.

== Track listing ==
1. "Last Kiss" (ラストキッス)
2. "Motto"
3. "Tanpopo" (たんぽぽ)
4. "Seinaru Kane ga Hibiku Yoru" (聖なる鐘がひびく夜)
5. "Otome Pasta ni Kandō" (乙女 パスタに感動)
6. "Koi o Shichaimashita!" (恋をしちゃいました!)
7. "Ōjisama to Yuki no Yoru" (王子様と雪の夜)
8. "Be Happy Koi no Yajirobee" (BE HAPPY 恋のやじろべえ)
