= All of Tanpopo =

Studio album by Tanpopo
- Released: September 4, 2002
- Genre: J-pop
- Label: Zetima
- Producer: Tsunku

Tanpopo chronology
Tanpopo 1 (1999)	All of Tanpopo (2002)

All of Tanpopo (All of タンポポ) is the second album by the Hello! Project girl group Tanpopo. It was released September 4, 2002 with the catalog number EPCE-5177. The limited edition contained a booklet with three different covers. The album peaked at #4 on the weekly Oricon chart and charted for five weeks, selling 75,670 copies in its first charting week.

This album contains the A-sides to all seven of the singles that Tanpopo had released at the time (their final single was released three weeks later). It also includes three B-sides, one song from their previous album, an updated version of their debut A-side, and one new song.

== Track listing ==
All tracks are written by Tsunku

No.	Title	Length
1.	"Otome Pasta ni Kandō"
2.	"Koi o Shichaimashita!"
3.	"Ōjisama to Yuki no Yoru"
4.	"Last Kiss"
5.	"Motto"
6.	"Tanpopo (Single Version)"
7.	"Seinaru Kane ga Hibiku Yoru"
8.	"I & You & I & You & I"
9.	"Tanjōbi no Asa" (誕生日の朝, "Birthday Morning")
10.	"A Rainy Day"
11.	"Baby Cry"
12.	"Nenmatsu Nenshi no Dai Keikaku"
13.	"Tanpopo (Grand Symphonic Version)"
