= Suiteroom Number 1 =

Studio album by v-u-den
- Released: October 26, 2005
- Recorded: 2004–2005
- Genre: J-pop
- Length: 50:23
- Label: Piccolo Town
- Producer: Tsunku

V-u-den chronology
Kurenai no Kisetsu (2005)	Suiteroom Number 1 (2005)	Issai Gassai Anata ni A-Ge-Ru (2006)

Suiteroom Number 1 (スイートルームナンバー１) is the full-length debut album by v-u-den, the Hello! Project-associated Japanese pop trio led by former Morning Musume and Tanpopo member Rika Ishikawa. Meant to commemorate the band's first anniversary as a unit, the release date actually came 13 months after the release of their first single. It contains all five of the band's single A-sides — "Koi no Nukegara", "Kacchoiize! JAPAN", "Ajisai Ai Ai Monogatari", "Hitorjime", and "Kurenai no Kisetsu" — plus several songs (and two opening and closing skits) centered on the "hotel room" concept of the album.

The album caps a prolific year for Ishikawa, who in the 13 months between V-u-den's first single and the release of the album, had also recorded three final singles and one last studio album (Ai no Dai 6 Kan) with Morning Musume, done one-off singles with fellow Morning Musume member Sayumi Michishige under the name Ecomoni, and with Maki Goto, Natsumi Abe and Aya Matsuura under the name DEF.DIVA, and became the de facto host of Hello! Project's Japanese TV show Hello! Morning. This activity may have had something to do with the lengthy wait for V-u-den's first full-length album to see the light of day.

== CD track listing ==
1. チェックイン (Check In)
2. カッチョイイゼ！JAPAN (Kacchoiize! JAPAN)
3. 愛～スイートルーム～ (Ai ~Suite Room~)
4. 紫陽花アイ愛物語 (Ajisai Ai Ai Monogatari)
5. 恋のヌケガラ (Koi no Nukegara)
6. Tea Break
7. ひとりじめ (Hitorijime)
8. クラクラ ディナータイム (Kurakura Dinnertime)
9. クレナイの季節 (Kurenai no Kisetsu)
10. 唇から愛をちょうだい (Kuchibiru Kara Ai wo Choudai)
11. パジャマな時間 (Pajama na Jikan)
12. まごころの道 (Magokoro no Michi)
13. チェックアウト (Check Out)

== Personnel ==
- Rika Ishikawa - lead and backing vocals, spoken word
- Erika Miyoshi - lead and backing vocals, spoken word
- Yui Okada - lead and backing vocals, spoken word
- Kotaro Egami - keyboards, drum and MIDI programming
- MIT Studio - sound effects on "Check In" and "Check Out"
- Hideyuki "Daichi" Suzuki - guitar, bass, keyboards, drum and MIDI programming
- Hiroaki Takeuchi - backing vocals
- Shouichiro Hirata - keyboards, drum and MIDI programming, backing vocals
- Takanori Tsunoda - guitar, keyboards, drum and MIDI programming
- Atsuko Inaba - backing vocals
- Ogu - backing vocals
- Akira - keyboards, drum and MIDI programming, backing vocals
- Jun Abe - keyboards, drum and MIDI programming
- Kenji Suzuki - guitar
- Nao Tanaka - keyboards, drum and MIDI programming
- Yuichi Takahashi - guitar, keyboards, drum and MIDI programming
- Shunsuke Suzuki] - guitar, keyboards, drum and MIDI programming
- Chino - backing vocals
- Ian Hartley - spoken word
- Kenny Scott - spoken word
- Isabelle Bruckert - spoken word
- Tsunku - composer, backing vocals

== Recording personnel ==
- Nobuyasu Umemoto - recording coordination
- Kansuke Yamamoto - recording coordination
- Kazumi Matsui - recording engineer, mix engineer
- Shinnosuke Kobayashi - recording engineer
- Ryo Wakizawa - mix engineer
- Takeshi Yanagisawa - mix engineer
- Hironobu Kitajima - mix engineer
- Youhei Horiuchi - 2nd engineer
- Mitsuko Koike - mastering engineer
