= List of Sengoku Collection episodes =

Sengoku Collection is a 2012 Japanese anime television series by Brain's Base based on a mobile social networking game by Konami. The series follows female versions of generals from the Sengoku period as they are mysteriously sent to the modern world and try to adapt to a new lifestyle. The series aired on TV Tokyo between April 5, 2012, and September 27, 2012, and was simulcast by Crunchyroll.

For the first 13 episodes, the opening theme is "Close Your Eyes and Hold Me" (目をとじてギュッしよ, Me o Tojite Gyusshiyo) by Abcho whilst the ending theme is "Unlucky Girl!!" by Sweety. For episode 14 onwards, the opening theme is "Back into my world" by Sweety, whilst the ending theme is "Darling and Madonna" (ダーリンとマドンナ, Dārin to Madonna) by You Kikkawa. Insert songs used in episode 2 are "Love Scope" by Kana Hanazawa and "Misty Moon" by Yuka Terasaki.

== Episode list ==
No.	Title	Original release date
1	"Sweet Little Devil"	April 5, 2012
In an alternate timeline, a female Oda Nobunaga is seen jumping into an inferno before being engulfed by a strange light. She arrives in the modern day where she runs into a boy named Seiichi Ōta, who helps her out. After spending a few days with Seiichi, Nobunaga desires to find a way back home and encounters three shrine maidens. They tell her that in order to return home, she must retrieve several 'secret treasures' residing in the hearts of the other feudal lords who were accidentally warped to this world.
2	"Peaceful Empress"	April 12, 2012
As Tokugawa Ieyasu wakes up in the modern world, she becomes instantly astounded by an idol named Rosary. Wanting to sing and dance like her, Ieyasu is picked up by a talent agency who start training her to become an idol. As Ieyasu has doubts about whether she can do this, the producer takes her to see Rosary, showing how she never gave up, convincing Ieyasu to keep trying. As Ieyasu makes her debut as an idol, she ends up becoming more popular than Rosary, which leads her to become bitter towards her. Following the argument, Ieyasu remembers coming from the Sengoku world and is approached by the shrine maidens and is brought before Nobunaga. Wanting to stay and become an idol, Ieyasu relinquishes her secret treasure to Nobunaga.
3	"Pure Angel"	April 19, 2012
Naoe Kanetsugu and Uesugi Kenshin are living together after arriving in the modern world, with Kenshin working as a model. Whilst Kenshin is happy with her life, Kanetsugu, who became colorblind upon entering the modern world, still longs to return to the Sengoku period and becomes upset and runs off when Kenshin wants to give up on her conquest. As Kenshin finds Kanetsugu and expresses her desire to keep her by her side, Kanetsugu regains her ability to see color and joins her. Deciding to stay together in the modern world, Kanetsugu and Kenshin relinquish their secret treasures to Nobunaga.
4	"One-eyed Dragon"	April 26, 2012
Upon arriving in the modern world, Date Masamune is tricked into working for the yakuza and ends up getting thrown into prison after getting caught in a police raid. After a fight breaks out in the showers, Masumune uses the opportunity to escape, determined to get revenged on the yakuza who screwed her over. She confronts the gang boss, telling him to commit seppuku, though soon decides he's not worth killing. Nobunaga then appears to challenge Masamune for her secret treasure, but she decides to postpone her fight in favour of searching for her servant, Katakura Kojūrō.
5	"Sword Maiden"	May 3, 2012
Tsukahara Bokuden, who had become a kendo instructor upon entering the modern world, is interviewed by a man named Morse for a documentary about the generals that have wondered in the modern world, along with other generals Ashikaga Yoshiteru and Yagyū Sekishūsai. However, when Bokuden sees the results, she finds it has been edited to make her seem like a threat. After speaking with Sekishūsai, whose reputation was also damaged by the documentary, Bokuden works with Sekishūsai and Yoshiteru to bring light to the scam during a live broadcast.
6	"Knowledge Master"	May 10, 2012
Self proclaimed genius Hiraga Gennai is trying to make a living off her unique inventions, but none of them are selling. Her main ambition is to build a time machine to take her further into the future whilst living with a young boy dreaming of becoming a soccer star. After working all day on her time machine, Gennai becomes shocked when she learns the boy had gotten into an accident and fractured his leg, ruining his chance to be in a match the next day. Feeling guilty, Gennai reworks her time machine to take her a day into the past so she can prevent his accident from happening, allowing him to take part in his match. With the time machine broken following its use, Gennai decides she would rather focus on the present.
7	"Refined Bard"	May 17, 2012
Wandering poet Matsuo Bashō comes across a family owned motel and café which is running under hard times. Overnight, she decides to redecorate the place, much to the ire of the stubborn owner, Marie, though after some convincing by her daughter, Ai, she allows her to help clean the rest of the motel. The motel soon gains more customers and Basho's haikus start to have a positive impact on the other staff. As Marie has trouble being honest about her feelings towards Basho's helpful works, she spots her going out to sea to speak with Nobunaga and chases after her, expressing her desire to learn haiku. Basho does eventually return, having given Nobunaga her sacred treasure, saying it is where she belongs.
8	"Regent Girl"	May 24, 2012
Whilst chasing after a runaway onigiri, Toyotomi Hideyoshi falls down a hole by a tree and enters a strange dream world filled with rice people. There, she encounters Nobunaga, who had ended up in the same world after trying to get Hideyoshi's hidden treasure. They end up embarking on a bizarre quest involving obscure objectives and a war between rice and wheat. Through some bizarre events, Hideyoshi becomes the saviour of the rice people and manages to return to the real world with an object that produces as much rice as she wants.
9	"Ambitious Princess I"	May 31, 2012
Hōjō Sōun, now going by the name of Ise Shinkurō, had become rather lethargic after realising the modern world was just too big to conquer. She is sent to attend high school with her housemate, Jun Takahashi, but has a bit of trouble fitting in at first. However, thanks to her smarts and her willingness to stand up for others, she soon starts to become popular with the other students. When she notices some bullies, she decides she wants to take down their leader. As Shinkurō feels taking down the leader was too easy, Jun, in a bid to keep her interested in going to school, makes up a lie that there may be more leaders higher up the table. Meanwhile, some other generals plot to make use of Shinkurō.
10	"Ambitious Princess II"	June 7, 2012
As Shinkurō becomes obsessed with the organization Jun made up, she comes up against another general named Fūma Kotarō, who reveals the supposed organization actually exists. Shinkurō soon confronts the boss, a large water puppet. Using her flame powers, Shinkurō manages to beat the puppet, discovering the puppeteer to be Imagawa Yoshimoto, who wants to recruit her to fight against Nobunaga. Shinkurō accepts the offer and makes a promise that she'll meet Jun once again.
11	"Brutal Maiden"	June 14, 2012
When a shady organization blackmails her nation's embassy into becoming a casino, the ambassador's daughter Sarah seeks out a gambler who can bankrupt the casino and comes across con artist Matsunaga Hisahide. After agreeing to the job, Hisahide manages to challenge the CEO to an all or nothing game of poker. Hisahide allegedly loses the match, but it turns out to be a distraction so her accomplices can steal all the money from the casino's safes.
12	"Dancing Blossom"	June 21, 2012
Keiji Maeda has gained a reputation as the 'Saturday Night Rider' who defends the innocent from delinquent bikers whilst living a double life as a slow-witted store clerk. On one Saturday, when Keiji's supervisor, Yamaguchi, is targeted by a rapist, Keiji rescues her and takes her on her motorbike whilst she sorts out another delinquent.
13	"Silver Hornet"	June 28, 2012
Nobunaga encounters a strange homeless girl named Ageha, who finds a pair of raffle tickets underneath a laundry machine, which wins them a two night trip to a hot spring inn. Meanwhile, an assassin named Sugitani Zenjubō is tasked by Yoshimoto to assassinate Nobunaga. As Zenjubō follows Nobunaga on the train bound for the hot springs, she is surprised to see Ageha with her, as she was the first person she met upon arriving in the modern world. As Nobunaga and Ageha enjoy their trip, Zenjubō struggles to find a good opportunity to assassinate Nobunaga. As Zenjibo ends up revealing herself out of frustration, Nobunaga takes her hidden treasure before taking her leave, telling Zenjubō she should stay with Ageha.
14	"Novel Deciders"	July 5, 2012
At a distinguished girls' school, Kondō Isami, Hijikata Toshizō and Okita Sōji are living in the modern world as high school girls. As the girls do various activities all day, Souji often falls victim to the whims of Isami and Toshizou.
15	"Annihilate Princess"	July 12, 2012
Mogami Yoshiaki is a little edgy when she has to spend two nights with her friends at a haunted mansion as she is afraid of ghosts. Things start to get weird when her friends start disappearing one by one during the night. Whilst attempting to find the supposed ghost responsible, Yoshiaki instead finds Masamune, who had been hiding out in the mansion. Yoshiaki offers to help Masamune but she declines, saying it is best to stay away from her so she doesn't get involved in her crimes. After Masamune leaves, Yoshiaki returns to find her friends are safe and sound.
16	"Blade Adept"	July 19, 2012
Ashikaga Yoshiteru plans a private party with Yagyū Sekishūsai, hoping to get revenge for the pranks she played on her in their youth. However, her attempt to get payback with a spice-filled snack backfires when Sekishusai catches on to her plan. As their rivalry heightens, Nobunaga appears, wanting to take their secret treasures. Wanting to keep their treasures, Yoshiteru and Sekishusai form a temporary alliance and have Nobunaga participate in a game of russian roulette using cakes filled with habanero peppers. However, Nobunaga manages to prevent any kind of cheating and Sekishusai is knocked out. After Yoshiteru and Sekishusai confess that they played pranks on each other because they respected each other, Nobunaga ends up eating the last spicy slice. Deciding she doesn't want to be separated from Sekishusai, Yoshiteru willingly drinks some super hot tea, passing out alongside her whilst Nobunaga takes their treasures.
17	"Sunshine Ruler"	July 26, 2012
Liu Bei is a maid-for-hire who is cursed to turn into a pig whenever the sun sets. She is asked to help out a former actress named Tae Haruhi who initially refuses her help, but soon starts to appreciate the work she does. During one night, Liu, in her pig form, spots Tae being hassled by her nephew, who wants her to move to a nursing home so he can build a condo over her house. As Liu gets knocked off by a stray sandal, Tae takes her inside the rooms she refused to show her normally, confessing how she pretends to be self-capable so that she won't have to go to a nursing home. Afterwards, Liu spends her days taking care of Tae and spends nights being looked after by her. As Tae eventually stumbles upon Liu's secret, they are approached by Nobunaga, who takes Liu's secret treasure, removing her curse in the process. As Tae's nephew once again attempts to get her to sign away her land, Liu stands in his way, declaring herself as Tae's protector and friend.
18	"Four Leaves"	August 2, 2012
Ōtani Yoshitsugu has often been plagued with bad luck, often spending her evenings alone searching for four-leaved clovers, believing in the words of a book written by someone named Angel. One day, Yoshitsugu finds a four-leaved clover and becomes delighted, only to find her luck hasn't improved at all. Dismayed, Yoshitsugu puts the clover she found in an envelope addressed to Angel and resides herself to her bad luck. To her surprise, she receives a response from Angel, telling her how bad luck can often lead to good luck. The two soon become pen pals, telling each other about their random bouts of good luck and sending each other little gifts. Yoshitsugu saves her money so she can take a trip to see Angel, but loses it whilst helping an old woman who was having a heart attack. As Yoshitsugu becomes frustrated when she stops receiving replies from Angel, she receives a plane ticket from Angel, asking her to come see her. However, when Yoshitsugu arrives, she learns that Angel had died from overwork, leaving behind one final letter explaining how Yoshitsugu's letter stopped her from killing herself and how she looked forward to their meeting.
19	"Vengeful Fang, IS"	August 9, 2012
Upon arriving in the modern world, Akechi Mitsuhide had lost her memory and has since become a police detective alongside her assistant, Kibayashi. She is brought on to investigate the murder of a girl named Ayako Hototogisu who was found naked and beheaded with a knife in her chest. As they whittle down their suspects, Mitsuhide becomes bothered by a masked person named Morilanty who shows up to observe the crime scenes. Coming to a realisation, Mitsuhide chases after Morilanty, discovering her to be Kibayashi, with the real Morilanty posing as her assistant. They soon accuse Mitsuhide of being the true murderer, believing the corpse was only headless as it belonged to Nobunaga. The whole thing is soon revealed to be a dream, as Mitsuhide awakes with her memory restored, believing she had really killed Nobunaga.
20	"Vengeful Fang, OS"	August 16, 2012
As Mitsuhide becomes overwhelmed with guilt and flees, her assistant Mori Ranmaru runs into Nobunaga and explains how Mitsuhide had been in a coma following a fire. Prior to entering the modern world, it is revealed Nobunaga and Mitsuhide got in an argument where Nobunaga insulted Mitsuhide's lack of a secret treasure. As Mitsuhide grew jealous after Hideyoshi got her own secret treasure, a secret treasure of her own began to grow inside her, filled with negative emotions. Then one day, when Nobunaga put Hideyoshi in charge of a command unit instead of Mitsuhide, secretly because Nobunaga wanted to keep her close, Mitsuhide's secret treasure takes control of her, driving her to set fire to Nobunaga's temple, which caused the phenomenon that sent them to the modern world. Back in the present, Mitsuhide is found by the tea master Sen no Rikyū, who tells her Nobunaga is still alive. Nobunaga soon appears to claim Mitsuhide's secret treasure, but Mitsuhide manages to drive her off and escape, saying she can't relinquish it to her just yet.
21	"Cavalry Queen"	August 23, 2012
Takeda Shingen winds up on board the Russian space station, Nadhokha, which has currently been taken over by an enemy AI known as Vesna-9000. Asked to help free the space station from Vesna's control so she can return to Earth, Shingen teams up with a support droid named Fasad and works her way past the enemy robots to reach Vesna. Upon reaching the centre of the station, Vesna tries to tempt Shingen with the dream of world conquest, but she rejects her offer and shuts her down. With her mission complete, Shingen and Fasad return to Earth where she intends to start up a chicken wing joint. Many plot elements, design features and scenes from this episode parody Stanley Kubrick's 1968 film 2001: A Space Odyssey.
22	"The Splendor"	August 30, 2012
Kojūrō is partnered with a cop named Higurashi who is investigating the whereabouts of Masamune. They approach Yoshiaki who initially refuses to tell them anything, but is persuaded by Higurashi to tell what she knows. Their investigation soon leads to a fishing village where Masamune is presumed to have died after being chased by a policeman and falling into the ocean. As Kojūrō checks the cliff, Masamune appears before her, having had the villagers lie about her death the evade the police. As the two struggle to think of a way they can be together whilst keeping true to their values, Higurashi appears and decides to give them an alibi so they escape together.
23	"The Dune"	September 6, 2012
Amago Tsunehisa transfers into a daycare and makes friends with a boy named Shimizu, who decides to help fulfil her dream of building a large sandcastle in the sandbox. Tsunehisa starts using her wisdom to slowly gain control of the various territories of the sandbox. However, another classmate named Misawa tells on the teacher, who forbids Tsunehisa from using the sandbox until after the weekend. The next week, Tsunehisa attempts negotiations with Misawa over how to split turns on the sandbox, but ultimately fails. Misawa decides to challenge Tsunehisa to a game in which they take turns to remove sand from a pile with a stick in it without causing the stick to fall. Although Misawa initially has the advantage, Tsunehisa manages to take into account the scheduled nap time, during which the wind knocks over the stick, securing Tsunehisa's victory. With the sandbox hers, Tsunehisa and the class work together to build the sandcastle of her dreams. However, moments after completion, Nobunaga ends up wrecking it when she comes to claim Tsunehisa's secret treasure, prompting swift vengeance from the class.
24	"Peaceful Empress - EX"	September 13, 2012
As Ieyasu continues to be successful in her idol career and prepares to star in a TV show, a young janitor named Kaoru Taniyama who had secretly been filming Ieyasu in her dressing room has a run in with a woman being chased by some thugs, who leaves behind an identical camcorder. As Ieyasu confiscates one of the cameras, which Kaoru realises wasn't his, they discover the woman who owned the camera being killed after being pushed off the roof. As Ieyasu and Kaoru view the contents of the camera, they find a record from the woman revealing Ieyasu's co-star, Tatsuya Sugimura, is in fact the boss of a crime syndicate. The two soon find themselves targeted by Sugimura's goons and escape on a truck, where Ieyasu admits she hasn't been enjoying her idol life. They deliver the evidence to the police, only to discover the chief is also under Sugimura's influence. As Sugimura and his goons corner them, they are saved by Ieyasu's manager, who was actually an undercover Interpol agent. The whole thing is soon revealed to be a movie, as Ieyasu remains devoted to remaining a top idol.
25	"Marshal Princess"	September 20, 2012
As Yoshimoto remains eager to face Nobunaga in battle, Sessai Choro enlists the help of Kotoro to find ways to distract her. Feeling sweets aren't doing the trick, Kotoro takes Yoshimoto to the wilderness to go fishing in the rapids. Despite having some initial trouble, Yoshimoto becomes delighted when she catches her first carp and starts taking up fishing as a hobby. After improving her skills, Yoshimoto moves onto a swamp where she discovers a gigantic golden carp and becomes determined to catch it. After some initial frustration, she learns how to hide her 'fishing intent'. Upon catching it, Yoshimoto is shown a vision about the simplicity of the world and decides to set it free. With her conviction now affirmed, Yoshimoto and her allies prepare for their attack on Nobunaga.
26	"Sengoku Collection"	September 27, 2012
Nobunaga receives a letter from Ageha and deduces that it is a fake set up by Yoshimoto to lure her out. Nobunaga soon engages in battle with Yoshimoto, who uses the river to her advantage, and is also confronted by Soun. As Nobunaga is outnumbered, Mitsuhide arrives to even up the odds and the two team up to defeat Yoshimoto and Soun. As Nobunaga claims Yoshimoto, Soun and Sessai's secret treasures, Mitsuhide steals them from her, stating she plans to collect the other remaining secret treasures to prevent Nobunaga from leaving her alone. As Nobunaga happily gives chase after Mitsuhide, Soun reunites with Jun whilst the other generals have fun enjoying their new lives.
