= Morning Musume filmography =

This is a list of appearances for J-pop group Morning Musume.

== Television ==
Title	Start date	End date	Station	Notes
Utaban	1996	Present	TBS	Talk show. The first talk appearance of Morning Musume was in 1998.
ASAYAN	3rd Quarter 1997	2002-03-24	TV Tokyo	-
Taiyō Musume to Umi (太陽娘と海)	1998-04	1998-06	TV Tokyo	-
Morning Musume no Heso (モーニング娘。のへそ)	2000-01	2000-09	TV Tokyo	-
Friday Night wa Onegai! Morning (フライデーナイトはお願い! モーニング)	2000-04	2001-09	NNS, Nippon TV, etc.	Produced by TV Iwate
Hello! Morning (ハロー!モーニング。)	2000-04	2007-04	TV Tokyo	Other Hello! Project members appear occasionally
Haromoni@ (ハロー!モーニング。)	2007-04-08	2008-09-28	TV Tokyo	Other Hello! Project members appear occasionally
muSix!	2000-12	2003-03	TV Tokyo, BS-Japan	-
Mō Taihen Deshita (モー。たいへんでした)	2001-04	2002-03	Nippon TV	-
Tintin Town! (ティンティンTOWN!)	2002-07	2004-03	Nippon TV	-
Mecha-Mecha Iketeru! (めちゃ²イケてるッ!)	N/A	N/A	Fuji TV	Okajo All-girls High School Series
Yorosen! (よろセン!)	2008-10-06	2009-03-27	TV Tokyo	Features other Hello! Project members
Collabo Labo (コラボ☆ラボ ～夢の音楽工房～)	January 27, 2009		WOWOW	Collaboration with TRF

== Radio ==
Show title	Start date	End date	Radio station	Host
Morning Musume no Onegai Morning Call -> Morning Musume no Super Morning Rider! -> Natsumi Abe no Super Morning Rider (モーニング娘。のお願いモーニングコール→モーニング娘。のスーパー・モーニングライダー！→安倍なつみのスーパーモーニングライダー)	1998-10-05	2000-12-29	Tokyo FM	-
Morning Musume Daiba -> Pucchi Moni Daiba (モー娘ダイバー→プッチモニダイバー)	1999-10-04	2000-12-25	Tokyo FM	Pucchi Moni members Sayaka Ichii, Kei Yasuda, Maki Goto, Hitomi Yoshizawa
Air Moni (エアモニ。)	2001	2003	Bunka Hoso	Natsumi Abe

== Commercials ==
- i-zone Hit Parade (2000, Polaroid)
- Tokyo Walker (2000, Kadokawa)
- Aircon「Kaiteki 3 mai」, N Keikaku (Kirei Nado) (2000-2001, Matsushita Electric Industrial Co., Ltd.)
- Yamucharou (2000-2001, Japan Tobacco)
- Dream Net (2000-2002, Dream Net)
- e-kara (2000-2003, e-kara)
- Pocky (2000-2003, Glico)
- Wasshoi! FIFA World Cup he Ikerundeso Matsuri (2001, Fuji Film) - 10 nin matsuri
- Saltimbanco (2001, Daily YAMAZAKI) -「Inspiration」「Renai Revolution 21」
- Elleseine (2001- )- Yuko Nakazawa and a few MM members
- Scoopy, Dio nado (2002-2003, Honda)
- Kiriri (2002-2003, Kirin Beverage)
- Quidam (2002-2003, Fuji TV) 「Quidam ga kimasu」「Zo wa demasen」「Quidam gaisen」
- Yomiuri Shimbun (2002)
- Japan Defense Agency - Self-Defense Force Recruitment Poster (2003)
- Colorio Printer (2004-, Epson Seiko Corporation) - Aya Matsuura and MM members

== Movies ==
Title	Year	Studio
Morning Cop ~Daite HOLD ON ME!~ (モーニング刑事。～抱いてHOLD ON ME!～)	1998	Toei
Pinch Runner (ピンチランナー)	2000	Toei
Koinu Dan no Monogatari (仔犬ダンの物語)	2002	Toei
Hamtaro the Movie 2 (劇場版とっとこハム太郎 ハムハムハムージャ！幻のプリンセス, Gekijo-ban Tottoko Hamutaro Ham-Ham Hamuja Maboroshi no Princess)	2002	Toho

== Musicals ==
Title	Location	Producer	Date	Miscellaneous Info
Love Century -Yume wa Minakerya Hajimaranai- (LOVEセンチュリー -夢はみなけりゃ始まらない-)	Nissay Theatre	Nobuhiro Nishikawa (西川信廣)	May 3, 2001 - May 27, 2001	37 Performances
Morning Town (モーニング・タウン)	Aoyama Theatre	Nobuhiro Nishikawa (西川信廣)	May 24, 2002 - June 24, 2002	41 Performances
Edokko Chushingura (江戸っ娘。忠臣蔵)	Meiji-za	Takuya Hiramitsu (平光琢也)	May 31, 2003 - June 29, 2003	26 Performances
HELP!! Atchii Chikyu wo Samasunda (HELP!!熱っちぃ地球を冷ますんだっ。)	Nakano Sun Plaza	Masayoshi Kashida (樫田正剛)	May 29, 2004 - June 13, 2004	20 Performances
Princess Knight (リボンの騎士)	Shinjuku Koma Theater	Shinji Kimura (木村信司)	August 1, 2006 - August 27	40 Performances

== DVD/VHS ==
This section lists DVD and VHS releases of television shows, movies, musicals, etc.

Title	Release date	Format
Morning Cop. Daite HOLD ON ME! (モーニング刑事。抱いてHOLD ON ME!)	September 2, 1998	VHS release
Kyou no Tamegoto part 1 (今日のタメゴト part 1)	April 25, 2001	VHS release
Kyou no Tamegoto part 2 (今日のタメゴト part 2)	April 25, 2001	VHS release
Kyou no Tamegoto part 3 (今日のタメゴト part 3)	August 29, 2001	VHS release
Kyou no Tamegoto part 4 (今日のタメゴト part 4)	August 29, 2001	VHS release
Morning Musume in Pinch Runner (モーニング娘。in ピンチランナー)	October 21, 2000	-
Momusume Hashiru! Pinch Runner (モー娘。走る! ピンチランナー)	November 21, 2000	-
Morning Cop. Daite HOLD ON ME! (モーニング刑事。抱いてHOLD ON ME!)	December 8, 2000	-
Morning Musume Kyou no Tamegoto Kanzenban (モーニング娘。 今日のタメゴト 完全版)	April 25, 2001	-
Morning Musume Kyou no Tamegoto Kanzenban 2 (モーニング娘。 今日のタメゴト 完全版2)	August 29, 2001	-
Morning Musume no Musical: LOVE Century -Yume wa Minakerya Hajimaranai- (モーニング娘。のミュージカル LOVEセンチュリー-夢はみなけりゃ始まらない-)	October 17, 2001	-
Shinshun! Love Stories	March 13, 2002	-
Namatamago (ナマタマゴ)	May 15, 2002	-
Tokkaekko (とっかえっ娘。)	July 17, 2002	-
Morning Musume no Musical: Morning Town (モーニング娘。のミュージカル モーニングタウン)	September 19, 2002	-
Making of Koinu Dan no Monogatari (メイキング・オブ 仔犬ダンの物語)	January 21, 2003	-
Hello! Morning: Haromoni Gekijou "Bus ga Kuru made" Vol.1 (ハロー! モーニング。 ハロモニ。劇場「バスがくるまで」Vol.1)	April 23, 2003	-
Hello! Morning: Haromoni Gekijou "Bus ga Kuru made" Vol.2 (ハロー! モーニング。 ハロモニ。劇場「バスがくるまで」Vol.2)	April 23, 2003	-
Hello! Morning: Haromoni Gekijou "Bus ga Kuru made" Vol.3 (ハロー! モーニング。 ハロモニ。劇場「バスがくるまで」Vol.3)	May 14, 2003	-
Koinu Dan no Monogatari (仔犬ダンの物語)	June 21, 2003	-
Morning Musume Suspense Drama Special: "Mikeneko Holmes no Hanzaigaku Kouza" - "Ore ga Aitsu de Aitsu ga Ore de" (モーニング娘。サスペンスドラマスペシャル。「三毛猫ホームズの犯罪学講座」「おれがあいつであいつがおれで」)	July 16, 2003	-
Halo halo! Morning Musume 6th generation member DVD (ハロハロ! モーニング娘。6期メンバーDVD)	July 16, 2003	-
Morning Musume shuen Musical: Edokko Chushingura (モーニング娘。主演ミュージカル 江戸っ娘。忠臣蔵 )	August 27, 2003	-
Alo hello! Morning Musume Sakuragumi & Otomegumi (アロハロ! モーニング娘。さくら組&おとめ組)	November 6, 2003	-
Hello! Morning: Haromoni Gekijou Vol.4 "Hirusagari no Mo-mama tachi & Bus ga Kuru made" (ハロー!モーニング。 ハロモニ。劇場 Vol.4 「昼下がりのモーママたち & バスがくるまで」)	December 26, 2003	-
Hello! Morning: Haromoni Gekijou Vol.5 "Ekimae Koban Monogatari & Isha ga Kuru made" (ハロー!モーニング。 ハロモニ。劇場 Vol.5 「駅前交番物語 & 医者がくるまで」)	December 26, 2003	-
Hello! Morning: Haromoni Gekijou Vol.6 "Ekimae Koban Monogatari" (ハロー!モーニング。 ハロモニ。劇場 Vol.6 「駅前交番物語」)	July 28, 2004	-
Hello! Morning: Haromoni Gekijou Vol.7 "Ekimae Koban Monogatari Tokubetsuhen" (ハロー!モーニング。 ハロモニ。劇場 Vol.7 「駅前交番物語 特別編」)	July 28, 2004	-
HELP!! Atchii Chikyu wo Samasunda. (HELP!!熱っちぃ地球を冷ますんだっ。)	August 25, 2004	-
Musume Dokyu! Vol.1 (娘DOKYU! Vol.1)	December 14, 2005	-
Musume Dokyu! Vol.2 (娘DOKYU! Vol.2)	December 14, 2005	-
Hello! Morning: Haromoni Gekijou Vol.8 "Koendouri Sancyoume" (ハロモニ。劇場 Vol.8 「公園通り三丁目」 )	December 21, 2005	-
Hello! Morning: Haromoni Gekijou Vol.9 "Koendouri Sancyoume"(ハロモニ。劇場 Vol.9「公園通り三丁目」 )	December 21, 2005	-
Musume Dokyu! Vol.3 (娘DOKYU! Vol.3)	July 26, 2006	-
Musume Dokyu! Vol.4 (娘DOKYU! Vol.4)	July 26, 2006	-
Princess Knight the Musical (リボンの騎士 ザ・ミュージカル)	November 29, 2006	Released on DVD

== Game ==
Title	Platform	Release date
Space Venus	PS2	January 11, 2001
Donkey Konga*	GameCube	January 12, 2003
Liliput Kingdom (リリパット王国 ～リリモニといっしょプニ!～)	Game Boy Advance	February 12, 2004
Osu! Tatakae! Ouendan*	Nintendo DS	July 28, 2005

* Features the group's 8th single "Koi no Dance Site"
