= Koi o Shichaimashita! =

Single by Tanpopo

from the album All of Tanpopo
- Released: February 21, 2001
- Genre: J-pop
- Label: Zetima Records
- Songwriter: Tsunku
- Producer: Tsunku

Tanpopo singles chronology
"Otome Pasta ni Kandō" (2000)	"Koi o Shichaimashita!" (2001)	"Ōjisama to Yuki no Yoru" (2001)

"Koi o Shichaimashita!" (恋をしちゃいました！, I Fell in Love!) is the sixth single by Morning Musume subgroup Tanpopo. It was released on February 21, 2001, on the Zetima Records label. The single features the group's "second generation" line-up of Ai Kago, Rika Ishikawa, Kaori Iida and Mari Yaguchi. The first press edition contained a limited-edition trading card.

The songs from this single are featured on the compilation album All of Tanpopo. "Koi o Shichaimashita" is the second track on the disk, while "Baby Cry" is the eleventh track. The music video for the single is featured on Tanpopo Single V Clips 1.

== Chart performance ==
The single peaked at #2 on the weekly Oricon charts, charting for nine weeks. It also made Oricon's year-end list of the 100 best-selling singles of 2001, ranking at #47.

A reported total of 238,880 copies were sold in the first week, and it is Tanpopo's best-selling single with 386,830 total copies sold.

== Track listing ==
All tracks are written by Tsunku.

No.	Title	Arrangement	Length
1.	"Koi o Shichaimashita!" (恋をしちゃいました!, I Fell in Love!)	Cher Watanabe
2.	"Baby Cry"	Yuichi Takahashi
3.	"Koi o Shichaimashita! (Instrumental)"	—

== Covers ==
"Koi o Shichaimashita!" was covered by fellow Hello! Project group S/mileage on the limited edition versions of their fifth single, "Koi ni Booing Boo!", released in April 2011.

== Members at time of single ==
- Kaori Iida
- Mari Yaguchi
- Ai Kago
- Rika Ishikawa
