= Orphen: Scion of Sorcery =

2000 video game

- European PlayStation 2 cover art
- Developer: Shade
- Publishers: JP: Kadokawa Shoten/ESP; WW: Activision
- Composer: Minoru Yamada
- Platform: PlayStation 2
- Release: JP: August 3, 2000; NA: October 26, 2000; EU: November 24, 2000
- Genres: Action, role-playing
- Mode: Single-player

Orphen: Scion of Sorcery, known in Japan as Sorcerous Stabber Orphen (魔術士オーフェン, Majutsushi Ōfen), is an action role-playing video game for the PlayStation 2. The game was developed by SHADE Inc. co-published by Kadokawa Shoten and ESP in Japan, and released abroad by Activision. Its lore is based on the light novel series Sorcerous Stabber Orphen by Yoshinobu Akita. The name 'Orphen' is officially derived from the word 'orphan', but also has a resemblance to Ancient Greek Orpheus, who has surprising connections to ancient Japan and ancient India. The game was a launch title for the PlayStation 2 in North America and Europe.

== Gameplay ==
Gameplay consists of a mix between platform/puzzle solving and battles. Outside of battles, the player usually controls Orphen or another member of their party and must explore each area one at a time, solving puzzles and jumping across platforms. Treasure chests are spread out throughout areas which contain either items that can be used outside of battle or equipment which is used during battle. Although enemies can sometimes be found throughout areas, there are many scripted battle sequences that occur throughout the game. In battles, the player controls one character throughout the whole battle and can use three different pieces of equipment: melee weapons, spells, and elemental shields. Though battles are set up like turn-based battles, the battles occur in real time so that the player, allies and enemies can all attack at any time. If the controlled character dies during battle, the game ends and the player is returned to the title screen. However, the player can pause the battle and change equipment at any time, restarting the battle in the process and avoiding a restart.

== Plot ==
Tricked by Volcan into sailing to the merchant city of Arvanrama on the premise of "easy money," Orphen and his friends quickly find themselves in trouble when monsters attack their ship. Somehow, they all make it off the sinking ship safely, only to find themselves stranded on Chaos Island, together with three other travelers: Sephy, Zeus and Mar. They set off to explore the island and learn of a time traveling object. Upon beating the game you are given the choice to go back in time and replay the story and help out a different person. After helping all three fellow travelers, the final battle initiates, in which you learn the whole thing has been a simulation created by a machine in the center of the island known as Gaia, and the fellow travelers were all chosen by Gaia to be actors in its stories. After defeating Gaia, the three travelers are freed and everyone is able to return home.

== Reception ==
Reception

Aggregate score
Aggregator	Score
Metacritic	54/100

Review scores
Publication	Score
AllGame	2/5
Electronic Gaming Monthly	5.33/10 (Note: Two critics of Electronic Gaming Monthly gave the game each a score of 5.5/10, and the other gave it 5/10.)
Eurogamer	5/10
Famitsu	22/40
Game Informer	4.25/10
GameFan	(M.V.S.) 65% 62% (Note: In GameFan's viewpoint of the game, three critics gave it each a score of 60, 61, and 66.)
GameSpot	6.7/10
IGN	4.5/10
Next Generation	2/5
Official U.S. PlayStation Magazine	3/5
RPGamer	2/10
RPGFan	(A.D.) 78% (A.K.) 58%

Orphen: Scion of Sorcery received mixed reviews according to the review aggregation website Metacritic. Human Tornado of GamePro said in one review, "While some who prefer more traditional gameplay might not like Orphen's action adventure twist, it still has a compelling storyline, interesting characters, and a good dose of fun." (Note: GamePro gave the game 4.5/5 for graphics, and three 4/5 scores for sound, control, and fun factor in one review.) In another GamePro review, Jake The Snake said that the game was "fun and sometimes challenging and should appeal to casual role-playing gamers and fans of the TV series." (Note: GamePro gave the game two 3.5/5 scores for graphics and fun factor, and two 4/5 scores for sound and control in another review.) David Smith of IGN said, "The fun of the occasional epic battle is crippled by the dozen mind-meltingly dull conversations you have to sit through to get to it." Jeff Lundrigan of NextGen said that the game was "both frustrating and not very challenging at the same time." In Japan, Famitsu gave it a score of 22 out of 40.

The game was a runner-up for "Role-Playing Game of 2000" in Readers' Choice at IGN's Best of 2000 Awards.
