= Otome Pasta ni Kandō =

2000 single by Tanpopo

Single by Tanpopo
- Released: July 5, 2000
- Genre: J-pop
- Label: Zetima
- Producer: Tsunku

Tanpopo singles chronology
| "Seinaru Kane ga Hibiku Yoru" (1999) | "Otome Pasta ni Kandō" (2000) | "Koi o Shichaimashita!" (2001) |

Otome Pasta ni Kandō (乙女 パスタに感動; "The Girl Excited By Pasta") is the 5th single by the Hello! Project girl group Tanpopo. It was released on July 5, 2000 under the Zetima label with the catalog number EPCE-5060. "Otome Pasta ni Kandō" is also featured on the album All of Tanpopo as the opening track. In the single's first week it sold 154,960 copies, selling 349,900 copies overall. The single peaked at #3 on the Oricon weekly charts, charting for eleven weeks. The single is the first release from the group's "second generation" (Kaori Iida, Mari Yaguchi, Rika Ishikawa, and Ai Kago).

In 2002, an English-language cover (titled "The Weekends") was recorded by Mylin Brooks, formerly of the "Mickey Mouse Club", for the album Cover Morning Musume Hello! Project!.

== Track listing ==
All tracks are written by Tsunku.

| No. | Title | Arranger | Length |
|---|---|---|---|
| 1. | "Otome Pasta ni Kandō" (乙女 パスタに感動, "The Girl Excited By Pasta") | Rui Nagai |
| 2. | "Watashi no Kao" (私の顔, "My Face") | Yasuaki Maejima |
| 3. | "Otome Pasta ni Kandō (Instrumental)" |
