= Erika Miyoshi =

Erika Miyoshi 三好 絵梨香
- Born: November 8, 1984 (age 40); Sapporo, Hokkaidō, Japan
- Occupations: Singer; actress
- Musical career
- Genres: J-pop
- Instrument: Vocals
- Years active: 2004–present
- Labels: Piccolo Town
- Website: Hello! Project.com

Erika Miyoshi (三好 絵梨香, Miyoshi Erika, born November 8, 1984 in Sapporo, Hokkaidō Prefecture, Japan) is a Japanese pop singer and former member of the Hello! Project-associated trio v-u-den.

== History ==
In July 2003, Erika successfully passed the Tsunku♂ Produce Hello! Project Shin Unit Audition. In August 2004, she joined the group called v-u-den with former Morning Musume member Rika Ishikawa and Hello! Project Egg Audition 2004 winner Yui Okada.

In early 2006 she joined the new Hello! Project kickball team Metro Rabbits H.P.

Miyoshi was cast as Kotomi Kanda in the Japanese film Sukeban Deka: Codename = Asamiya Saki, which was released on September 30, 2006.

== Appearances ==
=== TV shows ===
Show	Start date	End date
Majokko Rika-chan no Magical v-u-den (魔女っ娘。梨華ちゃんのマジカル美勇伝)	2004-10-04	2004-12-24
Musume Dokyu! (娘Dokyu!)	2005-04-06	2005-06-17

=== Radio ===
Program	Start date	End date
Hello Pro Yanen!! (ハロプロやねん!!)	2005-02-04	2005-03-18
B.B.L.	2005-04-03	Still running
TBC Fun Fīrudo Mōretsu Mōdasshu (TBC Funふぃーるど・モーレツモーダッシュ)	2005-08-08	2005-08-12
TBC Fun Fīrudo Mōretsu Mōdasshu (TBC Funふぃーるど・モーレツモーダッシュ)	2005-08-22	2005-08-26
