= Be Happy Koi no Yajirobee =

Single by Tanpopo

from the album Tanpopo/Petitmoni Mega Best
- Released: September 26, 2002
- Recorded: 2002
- Genre: J-pop
- Length: 13:24
- Label: Zetima
- Songwriter: Tsunku
- Producer: Tsunku

Tanpopo singles chronology
| "Ōjisama to Yuki no Yoru" (2001) | "Be Happy Koi no Yajirobee" (2002) |

Be Happy Koi no Yajirobee (BE HAPPY 恋のやじろべえ; "Be Happy (Balance Toy of Love)") is the 8th and final single by the Hello! Project girl group Tanpopo, and the first and only release by the group's "third generation" (Rika Ishikawa, Ayumi Shibata, Asami Konno, and Risa Niigaki). It was released on September 26, 2002 with the catalog number EPCE-5178. The first pressing came with a special trading card. The single peaked at #5 on the weekly Oricon charts, charting for 6 weeks. The single has a "crisp feel", with a touch of hip hop and R&B.

This single sold 40,070 copies in its first week and 60,450 copies all together, making it the group's lowest-selling single. The PV for the song was featured on Tanpopo Single V Clips 1, released in June 2004.

== Track listing ==
All tracks are written by Tsunku.

| No. | Title | Length |
|---|---|---|
| 1. | "Be Happy Koi no Yajirobee" (BE HAPPY 恋のやじろべえ, "Be Happy (Balance Toy of Love)") | 4:41 |
| 2. | "Yarutokya Yaranakya Onna no Ko" (やるときゃやらなきゃ女の子, "A Girl's Gotta Do What A Girl's Gotta Do") | 4:04 |
| 3. | "Be Happy Koi no Yajirobee (Instrumental)" (BE HAPPY 恋のやじろべえ（Iｎｓｔｒｕｍｅｎｔａｌ）) | 4:39 |
| Total length: | | 13:24 |

== Members at time of single ==
- Rika Ishikawa
- Ayumi Shibata
- Risa Niigaki
- Asami Konno
