= Yui Okada =

Yui Okada 岡田 唯
- Born: December 28, 1987 (age 38)
- Other names: Okayan, Yuiyan
- Occupations: singer; gravure model; model; race queen
- Musical career
- Genre: J-pop
- Years active: 2004–2010
- Label: Piccolo Town

Yui Okada (岡田 唯, Okada Yui) (born December 28, 1987) is a gravure model, model and race queen, former member of Japanese idol pop group v-u-den that was associated with Hello! Project. She remained within the group until its disbandment in 2008. She retired from the entertainment business to study beauty.

== Biography ==
=== History ===
Okada was born in Yao, Osaka. In June 2004, she passed Hello! Project Egg Audition 2004, the first audition to find Hello! Project trainees (known as Hello! Pro Eggs), along with 32 other girls. She was chosen out of over 10,500 applicants. Two months later, in August, she was put into a group with Morning Musume member Rika Ishikawa and sole "Hello! Project Shin Unit Audition" winner Erika Miyoshi. The group was named "V-u-den". Their debut single, "Koi no Nukegara", was released on September 23.

In January 2006, she was added to the new Hello! Project kickball team Metro Rabbits H.P. Her debut photobook, photographed in Okinawa and titled "I Doll" (a pun on "Idol"), was released in February, with the DVD released the following month. Okada was cast in the film Sukeban Deka: Codename Saki Asamiya as Tae Konno, released on September 30, 2006.

In 2008, it was announced that V-u-den would disband after their June concert tour. Her activities as a singer ceased, and she began to do gravure work, as well as appearing on variety shows.

On March 31, 2009, Okada graduated from Hello! Project along with the entire Elder Club, as part of a mass graduation. She also appeared at the Elder Club's final concert together the month before. She did, however, remain with Up-Front Agency, transferring to the Kansai division and moving to Osaka. On June 23, 2010, she announced her intent to retire from celebrity life. Her contract with Up-Front Kansai was terminated on June 30. She has since ceased all activities, intending to study beauty, hair and make-up, a subject in which she has long had an interest. Due to her previous graduation with the Elder Club, she is considered to have graduated from Hello! Project, even though she did not receive a graduation upon her contract termination with the Kansai division. In 2011 it was found that she is currently signed with an agency called Grace Agency and she is working as a model and a race queen.

In April 2013, Okada launched her clothing brand, Ivora.

== Releases ==
=== Photobooks ===
#	Title	Release date	ISBN
–	Hello Hello! Erika Miyoshi & Yui Okada Shashinshū from v-u-den (ハロハロ！ 三好絵梨香＆岡田唯 写真集from美勇伝)	2005-03-05	ISBN 4-04-894258-1
1	I Doll	2006-02-19	ISBN 4-04-894264-6
2	Yui Okada Hello! Project 2007 Winter Concert	2007-01-28	–

=== DVDs ===
- I Doll (2006-03-01)

== Appearances ==
=== Movies ===
- Sukeban Deka: Codename Saki Asamiya as Tae Konno (2006-09-30)

=== TV shows ===
Show	Start date	End date
Majokko Rika-chan no Magical V-u-den (魔女っ娘。梨華ちゃんのマジカル美勇伝)	2004-10-03	2004-12-24
Musume Dokyu! (娘DOKYU!)	2005-04-07	2005-06-07
Quiz! Hexagon II (クイズ!ヘキサゴンII)	2007-06-20	

=== Radio ===
Program	Station	Start date	End date
Hello Pro Yanen!! (ハロプロやねん!!)	ABC	2005-02-04	2005-03-18
B.B.L.	FM Fuji	2005-04-03	2006-09-30
TBC Fun Fīrudo Mōretsu Mōdasshu (TBC Funふぃーるど・モーレツモーダッシュ)	TBC	2005-08-08	2005-08-12
TBC Fun Fīrudo Mōretsu Mōdasshu (TBC Funふぃーるど・モーレツモーダッシュ)	TBC	2005-08-22	2005-08-26
TBC Fun Fīrudo Mōretsu Mōdasshu (TBC Funふぃーるど・モーレツモーダッシュ)	TBC	2006-11-13	2006-11-24
V-u-den Beauty Hour 21 (美勇伝 Beauty Hour 21)	Radio Amusement Park	2006-09-29	2007-03-30
V-u-den Miyoshi/Okada no Konya wa Futaribotchi (美勇伝 三好・岡田の今夜はふたりぼっち)	FM PORT	2007-04-06	208-06-27
