= Ōjisama to Yuki no Yoru =

Single by Tanpopo

from the album All of Tanpopo
- Released: November 21, 2001
- Recorded: 2001
- Genre: J-pop
- Label: Zetima
- Producer: Tsunku

Tanpopo singles chronology
"Koi o Shichaimashita!" (2001)	"Ōjisama to Yuki no Yoru" (2001)	"Be Happy Koi no Yajirobee" (2002)

"Ōjisama to Yuki no Yoru" (王子様と雪の夜; "Snowy Night with the Prince") is the seventh single of Morning Musume subgroup Tanpopo. It was released on November 21, 2001. The single peaked at #1 on the Oricon weekly charts, selling 129,980 copies in its first week, 201,040 copies overall, and charted for seven weeks.

The songs "Ōjisama to Yuki no Yoru" and "Nenmatsu Nenshi no Dai Keikaku" from this single are featured on the album All of Tanpopo. "Ōjisama to Yuki no Yoru" is the third track on the disc while "Nenmatsu Nenshi no Dai Keikaku" is the twelfth.

== Members at the time of single ==
- Kaori Iida
- Mari Yaguchi
- Rika Ishikawa
- Ai Kago

== Track listing ==
All tracks are written by Tsunku, arranged by Rui Nagai.

No.	Title	Length
1.	"Ōjisama to Yuki no Yoru" (王子様と雪の夜, "Snowy Night with the Prince")
2.	"Nenmatsu Nenshi no Dai Keikaku" (年末年始の大計画, "Big Plans for the New Year")
3.	"Ōjisama to Yuki no Yoru (Instrumental)"
