= Sorcerous Stabber Orphen =

Japanese light novel series

- Cover of the first DVD of Sorcerous Stabber Orphen: Spell of the Dragon

魔術士オーフェン (Majutsushi Ōfen)
- Genre: Adventure, comedy, sword and sorcery
- Light novel

Sorcerous Stabber Orphen: The Wayward Journey
- Written by: Yoshinobu Akita
- Illustrated by: Yuuya Kusaka
- Published by: Fujimi Shobo
- English publisher: NA: J-Novel Club
- Imprint: Fujimi Fantasia Bunko
- Magazine: Dragon Magazine
- Original run: May 1994 – September 2003
- Volumes: 20
Further information
Light novel
Sorcerous Stabber Orphen: The Reckless Journey
Written by	Yoshinobu Akita
Illustrated by	Yuuya Kusaka
Published by	Fujimi Shobo
Imprint	Fujimi Fantasia Bunko
Magazine	Dragon Magazine
Original run	February 1996 – October 2003
Volumes	13
Light novel
Sorcerous Stabber Orphen: Detour
Written by	Yoshinobu Akita
Illustrated by	Yuuya Kusaka
Published by	Kadokawa Shoten
Imprint	Kadokawa Mini Bunko
Original run	November 1997 – September 1998
Volumes	2
Manga
Written by	Yoshinobu Akita
Illustrated by	Hajime Sawada
Published by	Fujimi Shobo
English publisher	US: ADV Manga
Magazine	Dragon Magazine
Original run	27 December 1997 – 27 February 2003
Volumes	8
Anime television series
Directed by	Hiroshi Watanabe
Produced by	Tetsuo Genshō; Michihisa Abe; Yūji Matsukura
Written by	Masashi Kubota; Mayori Sekijima
Music by	Hatake (Sharam Q)
Studio	J.C.Staff
Licensed by	NA: Sentai Filmworks
Original network	TBS
English network	AUS: Adult Swim; NA: Anime Network
Original run	3 October 1998 – 27 March 1999
Episodes	24
Anime television series
Sorcerous Stabber Orphen 2: Revenge
Directed by	Tōru Takahashi
Produced by	Tetsuo Genshō; Michihisa Abe; Yūji Matsukura
Written by	Masashi Kubota; Mayori Sekijima
Music by	Yasunori Iwasaki
Studio	J.C.Staff
Licensed by	NA: Sentai Filmworks
Original network	TBS
English network	AUS: Adult Swim; NA: Anime Network
Original run	2 October 1999 – 26 March 2000
Episodes	23
Light novel
Slayers vs Orphen
Written by	Hajime Kanzaka; Yoshinobu Akita
Illustrated by	Rui Araizumi; Yuuya Kusaka
Published by	Fujimi Shobo
Imprint	Fujimi Fantasia Bunko
Magazine	Dragon Magazine
Published	2005
Light novel
Sorcerous Stabber Orphen: The New Wayward Journey
Written by	Yoshinobu Akita
Illustrated by	Yuuya Kusaka
Published by	T.O Entertainment
Original run	September 2011 – present
Volumes	12
Manga
Written by	Yoshinobu Akita
Illustrated by	Muraji
Published by	Kadokawa Shoten
English publisher	NA: Seven Seas Entertainment
Magazine	Comp Ace
Original run	March 2017 – November 2018
Volumes	5
Manga
Sorcerous Stabber Orphen: The Reckless Journey
Written by	Yu Yagami
Published by	Kadokawa Shoten
English publisher	NA: J-Novel Club
Magazine	Comp Ace
Original run	December 2018 – March 2021
Volumes	6
Manga
Sorcerous Stabber Orphen: The Youthful Journey
Written by	Kirouran
Published by	Kadokawa Shoten
English publisher	NA: J-Novel Club
Magazine	Comp Ace
Original run	25 December 2018 – 14 December 2019
Volumes	2
Light novel
Sorcerous Stabber Orphen Anthology
Written by	Yoshinobu Akita
Illustrated by	Yuuya Kusaka
Published by	T.O Entertainment
Published	30 November 2019
Light novel
Sorcerous Stabber Orphen: Comicron's Plan
Written by	Yoshinobu Akita
Illustrated by	Yuuya Kusaka
Published by	T.O Entertainment
Published	25 December 2019
Anime television series
Directed by	Takayuki Hamana
Written by	Reiko Yoshida
Music by	Shinnosuke
Studio	Studio Deen
Licensed by	Crunchyroll
Original network	AT-X, BS Fuji, Tokyo MX, Wowow
Original run	7 January 2020 – 31 March 2020
Episodes	13 + OVA
Light novel
Sorcerous Stabber Orphen: Heartia's Choice
Written by	Yoshinobu Akita
Illustrated by	Yuuya Kusaka
Published by	T.O Entertainment
Published	20 January 2021
Anime television series
Sorcerous Stabber Orphen: Battle of Kimluck
Directed by	Takayuki Hamana
Written by	Reiko Yoshida
Music by	Shinnosuke
Studio	Studio Deen
Licensed by	Crunchyroll: SEA: Medialink
Original network	AT-X, BS Fuji, Tokyo MX, Wowow
Original run	20 January 2021 – 31 March 2021
Episodes	11
Anime television series
Sorcerous Stabber Orphen: Chaos in Urbanrama
Directed by	Takayuki Hamana
Written by	Kenji Konuta
Music by	Shinnosuke
Studio	Studio Deen
Original network	AT-X, Tokyo MX, Wowow, BS Fuji
Original run	18 January 2023 – 5 April 2023
Episodes	12
Anime television series
Sorcerous Stabber Orphen: Doom of Dragon's Sanctuary
Directed by	Takayuki Hamana
Written by	Kenji Konuta
Music by	Shinnosuke
Studio	Studio Deen
Original network	AT-X, Tokyo MX, Wowow, BS Fuji
Original run	12 April 2023 – 28 June 2023
Episodes	12
- icon

Sorcerous Stabber Orphen (魔術士オーフェン, Majutsushi Ōfen; lit. 'Sorcerer Orphen') is a Japanese light novel series written by Yoshinobu Akita and illustrated by Yuuya Kusaka. It was adapted into manga, two anime television series and a video game.

As of December 2019, the novels had over 14 million copies in circulation.

== Plot ==
The young man Orphen engages in money lending activities in the back streets of the commercial city of Totokanta. Once, he was known as one of the Tower of Fang's most promising black sorcerers. One day, Orphen was approached by Volkan and Dortin, who had a very profitable money-making scheme set up. Under the guise of wealthy merchants, they set forth toward the Everlasting household to partake in a marriage fraud. But, there was one problem: Volkan's plan was full of holes, leading one of the sisters to find out about their plan too. Then suddenly, a huge monster attacks the mansion. Among all the commotion, one name rings out: Azalie. This monster was what he was looking for for five years: his older sister Azalie who transformed into a dragonic monster. Between those who seek to kill the monster and Orphen, giving everything to protect it, his peaceful days are at an end. Trying desperately to transform his sister, Azalie, back to her true form leads to a treacherous journey that, ultimately, allows Orphen to learn the vast secrets of his world.

== Media ==
=== Light novels ===
After publishing an award-winning Japanese-style fantasy novel Inside a Sparkle from the Snow Yoshinobu Akita, who possessed deep admiration for European and American literature, started his work on a European-style fantasy about the magical world of Orphen inhabited by three dimensional characters.

The series Orphen came about when author Akita, with Yuuya Kusaka as illustrator, created a series of light novels called Sorcerous Stabber Orphen: The Wayward Journey. It consists of 20 novels which were first published by Fujimi Shobo under their Fujimi Fantasia Bunko label in the Monthly Dragon Magazine between 1994 and 2003, and was the basis for the first anime and manga series. In November 2019, a light novel known as the Sorcerous Stabber Orphen Anthology was also released. It features a collection of original stories written by Akita, as well as guest writers such as Hajime Kanzaka, Yutaka Kono, Koushi Tachibana, Miya Kazuki, and Yomi Hirasaka. Ryo Mizuno was in charge of commentary while the illustrations and cover were drawn by Kusaka.

Two years after the beginning of the main novel series, Yoshinobu Akita created a second series called Sorcerous Stabber Orphen: The Reckless Journey, which is a collection of side-stories that depicted more light-hearted and comedic adventures that took place during Orphen's journey, and chronologically set before the events of the main series. The novel series spanned 13 volumes between 1996 and 2003, which were published the same way as the first series. In 2009, he published an additional chapter for the novel on Akita Yoshinobu's Sadami BOX, the author's personal website. In 1997, he released Sorcerous Stabber Orphen: Detour, a short light novel series that consisted of side stories that took place during the first half of Orphen's journey with Claiomh and Majic. The novels spanned two volumes.

In September 2011, T.O Entertainment released a brand new series of the Orphen novels known as Sorcerous Stabber Orphen: New Wayward Journey, which takes place more than two decades after the original series. Orphen is now older and is married to Claiomh Everlasting, both of whom give birth to three daughters that become Sorcerers. Majic is a Sorcerer lecturer at the new school that Orphen runs. Orphen is known as the "Demon King" due to his exploits in the original novels. The main protagonist of the new series is Mayor MacCredy, who is the son of Leticia MacCredy and Forte Puckingham. The novel series originally spanned into 10 volumes between 2011 and 2015. In September 2019, Yoshinobu Akita announced that in commemoration of the series' 25th anniversary, he would be writing a new novel for the main novella series titled Sorcerer Stabber Orphen: Comicron's Plan, a prequel that takes place four years after Orphen departed the Tower of Fangs to search for Azalie, which was released on 25 December 2019. It is tentatively referred to as the "Gap Edition" in the author's afterword which will fill in gaps within the main series' timeline with new stories, with three new volumes currently being planned. The books are published in a standard version and also a special edition version which comes with a behind the scenes booklet about the book and a Drama CD which is based on the new novel series itself. The original Orphen novel series received a reprint as well.

The Slayers vs Orphen novel was a special collaborative novel between Yoshinobu Akita and Hajime Kanzaka and was published in 2005. It was later reprinted in 2013.

During their panel at Anime Expo 2018, J-Novel Club announced that they had licensed the light novels.

=== Manga ===
The manga adaptation was created by writer Yoshinobu Akita and artist Hajime Sawada. The manga is split into two separate series: Majutsushi Orphen Haguretabi, which is six volumes long, and the two volume side story known as Majutsushi Orphen MAX. The first volume of the manga series was released in English in March 2005 by ADV Manga.

A doujinshi collection was released called Sorcerous Stabber Orphen Special Parody (Majutsushi O-fuen Haguretabi Spesharu Paarodi).

A new manga adaptation based on the main novels (the "Stray Journey" arc) was created and released by Yoshinobu Akita and illustrator Muraji from March 2017 to November 2018 and collected in five volumes. In July 2018, Seven Seas Entertainment announced their acquisition of the manga's license for English distribution. They released the first two volumes in 2019.

In August 2018, a manga adaptation based on the light novel spin-off series, Sorcerous Stabber Orphen: The Reckless Journey (Majutsushi Orphen: Mubouhen), was released. It is written and illustrated by Yu Yagami (The author of Those Who Hunt Elves). In July 2019, J-Novel Club announced the acquisition of the manga's license for English distribution.

In December 2018, Kirouran and Yoshinobu Akita released the first volume of a two-volume manga adaptation known as Sorcerous Stabber Orphen: Youthful Journey (Majutsushi Orphen: Pre-hen), which adapts the side-stories from Sorcerous Stabber Orphen: Reckless Journey light novels. The manga chronicles Orphen's childhood and misadventures at the Tower of Fangs with his classmates. J-Novel Club released the manga in English.

=== Anime ===
The original Sorcerous Stabber Orphen anime series was animated by J.C.Staff and produced by Kadokawa Shoten, Orphen was airing simultaneously on the TBS and HBC from 3 October 1998, to 27 March 1999, then it was released in North America on DVD and VHS by ADV Films in 2001. It has 24 episodes in length.

The original Sorcerous Stabber Orphen anime series was later released in Australia by Madman Entertainment in May 2002, the MSRP for the first series of Orphen in Australia were initially $29.95 AUD for DVD version, $22.95 AUD for VHS version, and $11.95 AUD for DVD version (which include the first three episode of the anime) that shipped with a PC PowerPlay Magazine.

A second series called Sorcerous Stabber Orphen 2: Revenge (Hepburn: Majutsushi Ōfen Ribenji), or Orphen Revenge, was later broadcast in 1999. The second anime series was released on DVD in North America in December 2003 by ADV Films. It has 23 episodes in length. In 2009, Sentai Filmworks released a box set featuring all 47 episodes of the two seasons of Orphen in an economic box set. A 2-disc SD Blu-ray of the entire series was released on 20 August 2019.

A new TV anime adaptation has been announced to commemorate the series' 25th anniversary. The series was initially set to premiere in 2019, but was rescheduled to premiere in January 2020.

The new series aired from 7 January to 31 March 2020, on AT-X, BS Fuji, Tokyo MX, and Wowow. The new series is animated by Studio Deen and directed by Takayuki Hamana, with Reiko Yoshida handling series composition, and Takahiko Yoshida designing the characters. Showtaro Morikubo reprised his role as Orphen, while the rest of the characters had new voice actors. Funimation licensed the show outside of Asia. An English dub premiered 21 January 2020. Following Sony's acquisition of Crunchyroll, the series was moved to Crunchyroll. It ran for 13 episodes, with an unaired episode bundled with the series' second Blu-ray volume on 8 May 2020.

A second season of the 2020 remake was announced with the title of Sorcerous Stabber Orphen: Battle of Kimluck. It aired from 20 January to 31 March 2021. Funimation licensed the second season and streamed it on its website in North America and the British Isles, in Europe through Wakanim, and in Australia and New Zealand through AnimeLab. The English dub launched on its service 9 June 2021.

A third season was announced on 26 September 2022, titled Sorcerous Stabber Orphen: Chaos in Urbanrama. Kenji Konuta is replacing Reiko Yoshida as the scriptwriter. It aired from 18 January to 5 April 2023. The opening theme song is "Hysteric Caravan" by Showtaro Morikubo, while the ending theme song is "Fantastic Partner" (ファンタジック・パートナー, Fantajikku Pātonā) by Mai Fuchigami.

A fourth season was announced on 9 January 2023, titled Sorcerous Stabber Orphen: Doom of Dragon's Sanctuary. The opening theme is "Motive Rain" by Showtaro Morikubo, while the ending is "Shūen no Destiny" by Mai Fuchigami. It aired from 12 April to 28 June 2023.

=== Video game ===
A single player console role-playing video game was released for the PlayStation 2 in 2000 by Kadokawa Shoten in Japan as Sorcerous Stabber Orphen and by Activision in North America and Europe as Orphen: Scion of Sorcery. It included a whole new adventure and a few video scenes with more sophistication but a minor difference in the voices and personalities of the characters. Reviews of the game were mixed.

== Reception ==
As of December 2019, the novels had over 14 million copies in circulation.

In the 21st Anime Grand Prix polls conducted by Animage in June 1999, Orphen was voted the second "Favorite Male Character", the TV series was vote the eight "Anime Title of the Year" and first Ending themes from the anime, "Last Kiss" by Tanpopo was ranked 16th placed for "Best Theme Song Of The Year".

Mike Crandol of Anime News Network called the series a "fairly enjoyable fantasy adventure" but criticized it for falling into "a pitfall common for anime sword-and-sorcery series." He later called the anime "all-around average...in terms of art, music, and animation."
