= V-u-den =

Japanese idol girl group

V-U-den 美勇伝
- 1st gen: Erika Miyoshi, Rika Ishikawa, Yui Okada

Background information
- Origin: Tokyo, Japan
- Genres: J-pop
- Years active: 2004–2008
- Label: Piccolo Town
- Spinoffs: Zoku V-U-den
- Past members: Rika Ishikawa; Erika Miyoshi; Yui Okada
- Website: www.helloproject.com

V-U-den (美勇伝, Biyūden; stylized in lowercase, lit. "beautiful brave legends") was a Japanese idol girl group associated with Hello! Project. The group was formed in August 2004 and consists of members Rika Ishikawa (Morning Musume), Erika Miyoshi, and Yui Okada, with Ishikawa being the leader. The group officially disbanded on June 29, 2008, after their last concert during their v-u-densetsu 5 tour.

== Members ==
- Rika Ishikawa
- Erika Miyoshi
- Yui Okada

== Legacy ==
In 2009, V-U-den was revived as a Hello! Project Shuffle Unit under the name Zoku V-U-den (続・美勇伝). The new line-up consisted of Morning Musume members Sayumi Michishige and Jun Jun; and Berryz Kobo member Risako Sugaya. The group released songs for Hello! Project's compilation album Champloo 1: Happy Marriage Song Cover Shū. They also performed as a concert-only unit until 2011. In 2013, Zoku V-U-den reappeared with Rika Ishikawa to perform "Koisuru Angel Heart".

== Discography ==
=== Albums (first generation) ===
#	Title	Release date
1	Suiteroom Number 1 (スイートルームナンバー1)	October 26, 2005
–	v-u-den Single Best 9 Vol.1 Omaketsuki (美勇伝シングルベスト9 Vol.1おまけつき)	November 21, 2007

=== Singles (first generation) ===
#	Title	Release date	Details
1	"Koi no Nukegara" (恋のヌケガラ, Cast-Off Love)	September 23, 2004	
2	"Kacchoiize! Japan" (カッチョイイゼ! Japan, Very Cool! Japan)	May 2, 2005	Yokoso! Japan campaign song
3	"Ajisai Ai Ai Monogatari" (紫陽花アイ愛物語, Hydrangea Love Story)	May 25, 2005	Opening theme of the Kids Station anime "Patalliro Saiyuuki"
4	"Hitorijime" (ひとりじめ, All By Myself)	August 10, 2005	
5	"Kurenai no Kisetsu" (クレナイの季節, Crimson Season)	October 5, 2005	
6	"Issai Gassai Anata ni Ageru" (一切合切あなたに𝄞あ・げ・る♪, I'll Give Any and Every Thing to You)	May 10, 2006	
7	"Aisu Cream to My Pudding" (愛すクリ～ムとMyプリン, Love Cream and My Pudding *)	November 22, 2006	
8	"Koisuru Angel Heart" (恋する♡エンジェル♡ハート, Loving Angel Heart)	May 23, 2007	
9	"Jaja Uma Paradise" (じゃじゃ馬パラダイス, Unmanageable Girl Paradise)	September 26, 2007	
10	"Nanni mo Iwazu ni I Love You" (なんにも言わずに I LOVE YOU, Without Saying A Word, I Love You)	April 23, 2008	Cover of Morning Musume song from 4th Ikimasshoi!

* Though the romanization of this song would imply the translation would be "Ice Cream and My Pudding", "Aisu" is written with the kanji "Ai (愛)" for "love", thus making it "Love Cream and My Pudding". Also, in the PV for the song, there is a two-second screen that translates it as "Ice Cream and My Pudding", therefore it is a play on words.

=== Singles (second generation) ===
#	Title	Release date	Details
1	"Only You"	July 15, 2009	A cover of BOØWY's "ONLY YOU"

- "ONLY YOU" is released on the compilation "Champloo 1 ~Happy Marriage Song Cover Shuu~ (チャンプル1 ~ハッピーマリッジソングカバー集~)

=== DVDs ===
#	Title	Release date
1	Single V Koi no Nukegara (シングルV・恋のヌケガラ)	October 6, 2004
2	Single V Kacchoiize! Japan (シングルV・カッチョイイゼ! Japan)	March 9, 2005
3	Single V Ajisai Ai Ai Monogatari (シングルV・紫陽花アイ愛物語)	June 8, 2005
4	v-u-den First Concert Tour 2005 Haru ~v-u-densetsu~	June 8, 2005
5	Single V Hitorijime (シングルV・ひとりじめ)	August 24, 2005
6	Single V Kurenai no Kisetsu (シングルV・クレナイの季節)	October 13, 2005
7	v-u-den Concert Tour 2005 Aki v-u-densetsu II ~Kurenai no Kisetsu~	February 15, 2006
8	Single V Issai Gassai Anata ni Ageru (シングルV・一切合切 あなたに∮あ・げ・る♪)	May 24, 2006
9	Single V Aisu Cream to My Purin (シングルV・愛すクリ〜ムとＭｙプリン)	December 6, 2006
10	v-u-den Live Tour 2006 Aki v-u-densetsu III ~Aisu Cream to My Purin~	March 7, 2007
11	Single V Koisuru Angel Heart (シングルV・恋する♡エンジェル♡ハート)	May 30, 2007
12	v-u-den Concert Tour 2007 Shoka v-u-densetsu IV ~Usagi to Tenshi~	August 8, 2007
13	Single V Jaja Uma Paradise (シングルV・じゃじゃ馬パラダイス)	October 10, 2007
