= Abcho =

Japanese pop unit

- Origin: Tokyo, Japan
- Genres: J-pop; pop
- Years active: 2012–present
- Labels: Universal Music Japan (Delicious Deli Records)
- Spinoff of: Morning Musume
- Members: Hitomi Yoshizawa; Rika Ishikawa
- Website: www.universal-music.co.jp/abcho/

Abcho (typeset as ABCHO, meaning Abstract Chop), is a Japanese pop unit made up of two members from Japanese pop groups Morning Musume, their subgroup which includes Older/Graduated Members, Dream Morning Musume, and J-Pop Metal Group Hangry & Angry: Hitomi Yoshizawa and Rika Ishikawa. They formed in middle of February 2012, and released their first single on May 23, 2012.

== Members ==
Name	Birth date	Age	Notes
Hitomi Yoshizawa	April 12, 1985	39	Former Morning Musume member
Rika Ishikawa	January 19, 1985	40	Former Morning Musume member

== History ==
=== 2008: Before Abcho ===
Hitomi Yoshizawa and Rika Ishikawa were in another duo called Hangry & Angry.

=== 2012-present: Formation and debut single ===
In February 2012, Hitomi Yoshizawa and Rika Ishikawa announced that would form a new unit called Abcho. Abcho's first single was released on May 23, 2012. This was used as the opening theme song for Sengoku Collection.

== Discography ==
=== Singles ===
- "Me o Tojite Gyusshiyo" (目をとじてギュッしよ)
