= Yo-Yo Girl Cop =

2006 Japanese film by Kenta Fukasaku

- Japanese theatrical poster
- Directed by: Kenta Fukasaku
- Screenplay by: Shoichi Maruyama
- Based on: Sukeban Deka by Shinji Wada
- Produced by: Tatsuya Kunimatsu; Masatake Kondo
- Starring: Aya Matsuura; Rika Ishikawa; Erika Miyoshi; Yui Okada; Yuki Saito; Hiroyuki Nagato; Shunsuke Kubozuka; Riki Takeuchi
- Cinematography: Takashi Komatsu
- Edited by: Chieko Suzaki
- Music by: Goro Yasukawa
- Production companies: Toei Company; Toei Video; Up-Front Agency; Point Break Pictures; Seikoudou; Japan Amusement Agency; Chase Film; TV Tokyo; Yomiko Advertising; TV Tokyo Music; Artist House Investment; Television Osaka
- Distributed by: Toei Company, Ltd.
- Release date: September 30, 2006 (Japan)
- Running time: 98 minutes
- Country: Japan
- Language: Japanese

Yo-Yo Girl Cop, known in Japan as Sukeban Deka: Code Name = Saki Asamiya (Japanese: スケバン刑事 コードネーム=麻宮サキ, Hepburn: Sukeban Deka: Kōdo Nēmu = Asamiya Saki) is a 2006 Japanese action film based on the 1975 manga Sukeban Deka by Shinji Wada. It was directed by Kenta Fukasaku and written by Shoichi Maruyama.

The film stars Aya Matsuura in the lead role of Saki Asamiya and Rika Ishikawa as her rival, Reika Akiyama. Yuki Saito, who played the role of Saki in the first live-action television series, appears here as her original character, who is revealed to be Saki's mother. The film was released on September 30, 2006, in Japan and in the United States on July 17, 2007 by Magnolia Pictures as Yo-Yo Girl Cop.

== Plot ==
Twenty years after the events of the original series, a Japanese girl by the name of "K" is arrested in New York for beating 11 policemen. Although held in a straitjacket, she escapes by dislocating her own shoulder and tries to exit the facility, but a moment of kindness to comfort a little girl gets her captured again. K is then informed by Japanese inspector Kazutoshi Kira that her mother will be deported to Japan for brutalizing a mugger and living illegally in New York, unless K accepts to work for them in the reactivated Sukeban Deka program.

After accepting, not without hesitating for her strained relationship with her mother, K is given a hi-tech steel yo-yo weapon and a new name, "Saki Asamiya," and is ordered to infiltrate an elite high school in Japan. The school, Seisen Academy, is suspected to be the source of a website called "Enola Gay" that rallies juvenile suicide bombers across the country. She is also briefed that another Sukeban operative was sent earlier only for her to commit suicide too, and that a counter for 72 hours has just appeared on the website.

Upon arriving the school, Saki learns that the entire school is dominated by a girl named Reika Akiyama and her henchwomen, and she immediately saves a bullied student named Taie "Tae" Konno from them. Saki looks into the chemistry club, which the former operative was investigating before her death, and is forced to struggle to save two suicide bombers, Amaki and Higashiyama, who try to use Tae as a human shield. Asamiya captures Higashiyama, while Amaki is saved from her bomb by the school janitor Jirou Kimura, who had become friends with Saki earlier.

Kira interrogates Higashiyama and informs Saki that the Enola Gay website is run by a user named Romeo, but Higashiyama is then abducted by a gang of thugs, despite Asamiya's efforts to fight them off. Afterwards, Tae tells Saki that she and a fellow bullied schoolgirl named Kotomi Kanda used to run together an anti-bullying website until Kanda snapped and tried to commit suicide by bombing, being left catatonic in a hospital and leaving their site to be replaced by Enola Gay. Moreover, Reika interrupts them and reveals that Kotomi fell in love with a man who compelled her to blow herself up. Going to the hospital, Saki and Tae visit Kotomi, who gives the name of Jirou Kimura. Now revealed to be Romeo, Kimura kidnaps Saki and ties her to a bomb, which she is left to escape from.

Meanwhile, Reika reveals herself as Romeo's lover and hosts an assembly on the school in front of all the students and teachers in order to celebrate his ideology. At the same time, Romeo and his gang capitalize on the event to rob a bank in Tokyo. Tae is brought in and strapped to another bomb, but after some dramatic exchanges she is saved by the returning Saki. The latter chases Reika, who still has Tae as her hostage and is attempting to reach Romeo, and ends up facing her in a singles duel. It's then revealed that Reika is a former operative of Tokumei Keiji, a police program similar to Sukeban Deka, and that she has her own armed yo-yo, which sports blades. Although the less experienced Asamiya is initially overpowered when trying to user her weapon, she defeats Reika by burying her under metal pipes.

Saki then confronts Romeo and his gang, who have seized Tae, Amaki and Higashiyama as bomb-strapped hostages, and manages to take the villains out thanks to a bulletproof uniform. Eventually Romeo, who wears a bomb strap as well, disables her yo-yo by slicing the string with his katana, but she still knocks him out. Saki takes the artifacts off the hostages but leaves Romeo's to explode, killing him.

At the end, Saki calls her mom, who is implied to be the first ever Saki Asamiya from the original series. After bidding farewell to Tae and Kotomi, Saki is informed by Kira of a new mission for her.

== Cast ==
- Aya Matsuura as Saki Asamiya (麻宮 サキ, Asamiya Saki)
- Rika Ishikawa as Reika Akiyama (秋山 レイカ, Akiyama Reika)
- Erika Miyoshi as Kotomi Kanda (神田 琴美, Kanda Kotomi)
- Yui Okada as Tae Konno (今野 多英, Konno Tae)
- Shunsuke Kubozuka as Jiro Kimura (騎村 時郎, Kimura Jirō)
- Riki Takeuchi as Kazutoshi Kira (吉良 和俊, Kira Kazutoshi)
- Hiroyuki Nagato as Dark Inspector (暗闇警視, Kurayami Keishi)
- Makoto Sakamoto as Higashiyama (東山, Higashiyama)
- Mark Musashi as Wu
- Houka Kinoshita as a teacher
- Masai Ōtani as a detective
- Tak Sakaguchi as a member of the Enola Gay gang
- Yuki Saito as Saki's Mother

== Music ==
The movie's theme song, "Thanks!" is by the Hello! Project group GAM, consisting of Aya Matsuura and Miki Fujimoto. The song "Shinkirō Romance", also by GAM, was used an insert song.

== UK release ==
Yo-Yo Girl Cop was licensed for UK release by 4Digital Asia, a sublabel of 4Digital Media, formerly ILC Entertainment. The new sub-label was launched in 2008 to fill the gap in the UK for "Asia Extreme" titles created by the demise of label Tartan. It was released on DVD on September 22.

== Miscellaneous ==
The film is parodied in the softcore V-Cinema release Yo-yo Sexy Girl Cop (スケパン刑事 バージンネーム＝諸見栄サキ, Sukepan Deka: Bājin Nēmu = Moromi Saki; literally "See-through Panties Detective: Virgin Name = Saki Moromie"), directed by Daigo Udagawa and starring AV idol Mihiro. In addition to its similar name, the cover artwork is a near-reproduction of Yo-yo Girl Cop's original poster. The DVD was released in Japan in November 2006 and in the United States with English subtitles by Cinema Epoch in November 2008.
