= Tanpopo (song) =

"Tanpopo (たんぽぽ)"

Single by Tanpopo

from the album Tanpopo 1
- Released: June 16, 1999 (JP)
- Recorded: 1999
- Genre: J-pop
- Label: Zetima Records
- Songwriter: Tsunku
- Producer: Tsunku

Tanpopo singles chronology
"Motto" (1999)	"'Tanpopo' (たんぽぽ)" (1999)	"Seinaru Kane ga Hibiku Yoru" (1999)

"Tanpopo" (たんぽぽ, Dandelion) is the third single of Hello! Project subgroup Tanpopo. It was released on June 16, 1999 as an 8 cm CD. It reached number ten on the Japan Oricon charts. Unlike other Tanpopo singles, the song was first featured in Tanpopo 1 before it was released as a single.

Former Tanpopo member, Aya Ishiguro, reunited with the group's 2nd Generation to sing the Grand Symphonic version of the song. This new version, along with the single version, was featured in the group's second album, All of Tanpopo. It was also featured as the ending theme song for the variety show Warau Inu no Bouken: YARANEVA!!.

== Track listing ==
The lyricist and composer of the songs is Tsunku. The arranger of "Tanpopo" was Takao Konishi, while Kaoru Yamauchi arranged the b-side song.

1. "Tanpopo"
2. "A Rainy Day"
3. "Tanpopo (Instrumental)"

== Members at the time of single ==
- Aya Ishiguro (石黒彩)
- Kaori Iida (飯田圭織)
- Mari Yaguchi (矢口真里)

== Musical Personnel ==
=== Tanpopo ===
- Aya Ishiguro - vocals
- Kaori Iida - vocals
- Mari Yaguchi - vocals
- Beijing Love Band - strings
- Go Katsuura (勝浦剛) - manipulator
- Takao Konishi (小西貴雄) - keyboards & programming
- Takashi Masuzaki (増崎孝司) - guitar

=== A Rainy Day ===
- Aya Ishiguro - vocals
- Kaori Iida - vocals
- Mari Yaguchi - vocals
- Tsuyoshi Nishida (ニシダツヨシ) - guitar
- Kaoru Yamauchi (山内薫) - bass, keyboards, & programming
