= Morning Musume: Shinshun! Love Stories =

- DVD cover
- Also known as: Shinshun! Love Stories
- Genre: Drama
- Directed by: Kazuhiro Onohara
- Starring: Morning Musume
- Country of origin: Japan
- Original language: Japanese

Production
- Running time: 130 minutes

Original release
- Release: March 13, 2002

Shinshun! Love stories (新春! LOVEストーリーズ) is a 2002 Japanese telefilm starring members of the all-girl J-pop group Morning Musume.

Shinshun! Love stories is an anthology film based on three different romantic stories: The Dancing Girl of Izu, Haikara-san ga Tōru and Toki o Kakeru Shōjo. The film aired on Tokyo Broadcasting System on January 2, 2002. A limited edition DVD was released on October 26, 2005.

== Segments ==
=== The Dancing Girl of Izu ===
The Dancing Girl of Izu stars Maki Goto along with Kei Yasuda and Nozomi Tsuji.

=== Haikara-san ga Toru ===
Haikara-san ga Tōru stars Rika Ishikawa along with Hitomi Yoshizawa, Mari Yaguchi, Ai Takahashi, Risa Niigaki, Makoto Ogawa and Asami Konno.

=== Toki o Kakeru Shojo ===
Toki o Kakeru Shōjo stars Natsumi Abe as Kazuko Yoshiyama, Kaori Iida as her friend, Ai Kago as her sister, and actors Takashi Nagayama and Asahi Uchida.
