= Hangry & Angry =

Japanese female pop and rock duo

Hangry & Angry-f
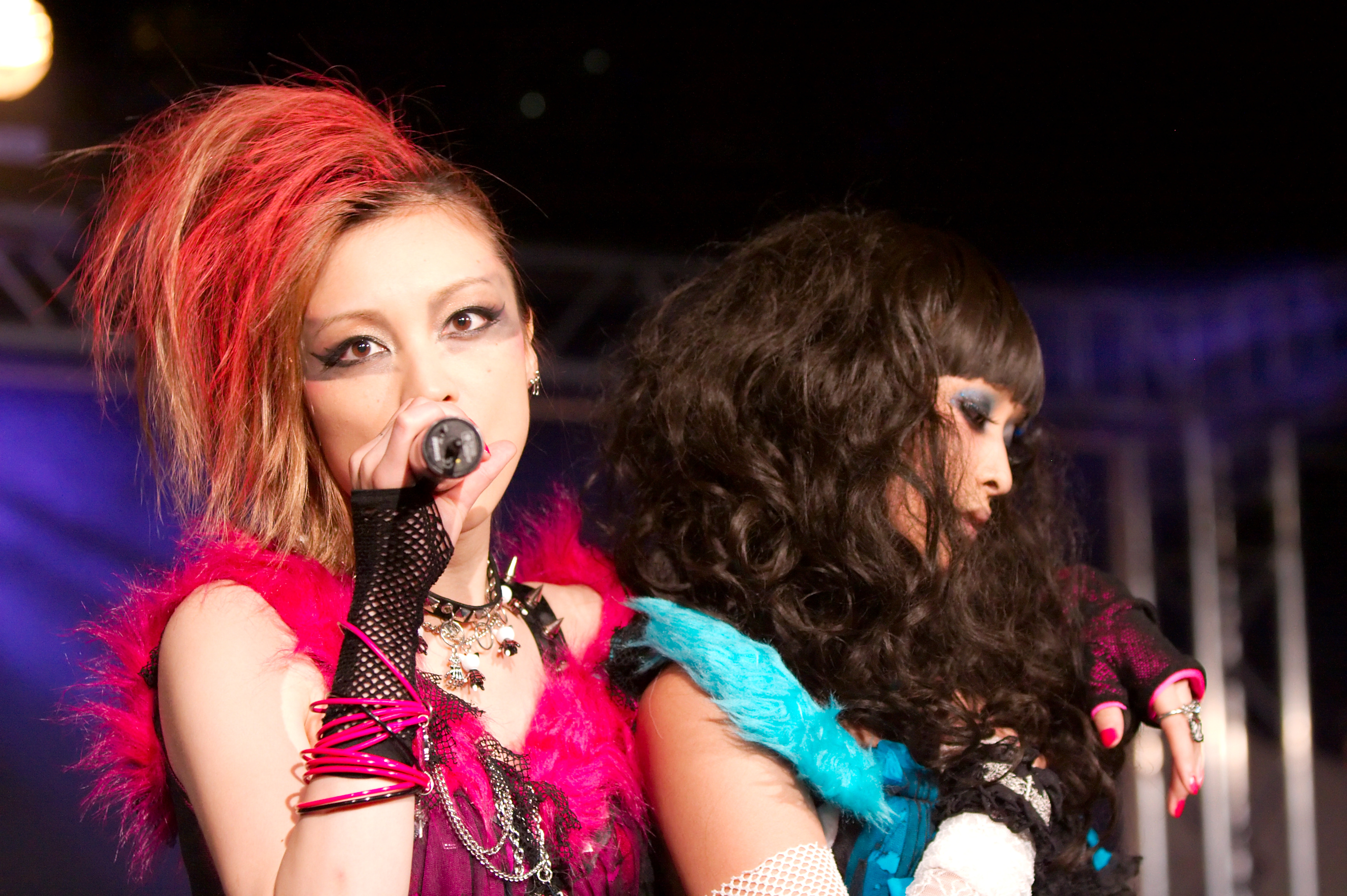
- Hangry & Angry at Japan Expo 2009 in Paris, France.

Background information
- Also known as: hANGRY & ANGRY, HANGRY & ANGRY
- Origin: Japan
- Genres: Pop; rock
- Years active: 2008—2011
- Labels: Gan-Shin; Gothuall; Zetima
- Members: Hitomi Yoshizawa; Rika Ishikawa
- Website: hangryandangry-f.com

Hangry & Angry-f (stylized as HANGRY & ANGRY-f, previously known as hANGRY & ANGRY) was a Japanese female pop and rock duo created in 2008, consisting of former Morning Musume members Hitomi Yoshizawa ("Hangry") and Rika Ishikawa ("Angry").

The duo was a collaboration with a Harajuku fashion store, which sells fashion designer h.Naoto's mascot kittens of the same name. The band served to promote stuffed toys and various other products from the store.

== History ==
The duo was officially announced via the opening of their MySpace account in October 2008. The page drew 100,000 views within four days, and quickly reached one million views.

Their first mini-album, Kill Me Kiss Me, was released simultaneously in Japan and South Korea on 19 November 2008.

It was not initially revealed who the two girls really were, though fans quickly recognized them and they later revealed themselves to be Yoshizawa and Ishikawa.

As of 2009, the duo became known as Hangry & Angry-f, the "f" referring their new future style of white costumes.

In April 2009, they made their overseas debut at Sakura-Con in Seattle, Washington.

== Discography ==
=== Albums ===
#	Title	Release date	Album type
1	Kill Me Kiss Me	19 November 2008	mini-album
1	Sadistic Dance	18 November 2009	studio album

=== Singles ===
#	Title	Release date
1	"Kill Me Kiss Me"	10 October 2008
2	"Top Secret"	11 November 2009
3	"Reconquista"	2 July 2011

== See also ==
- List of Gan-Shin artists
- List of Japanese musicians
- List of musical artists from Japan
- List of rock musicians
- List of Zetima artists
- Music of Japan
