= Tanpopo =

Subgroup of Japanese pop idol girl group Morning Musume

Tanpopo タンポポ
- Origin: Tokyo, Japan
- Genres: J-pop
- Years active: 1998–2003, 2009– 2011, 2016, 2018
- Label: Zetima
- Spinoffs: Tanpopo Sharp
- Spinoff of: Morning Musume
- Past members: Aya Ishiguro; Kaori Iida; Mari Yaguchi; Ai Kago; Rika Ishikawa; Asami Konno; Risa Niigaki; Ayumi Shibata
- Website: helloproject.com

Tanpopo (タンポポ; lit. "Dandelion") was a sub-group of the Japanese idol girl group Morning Musume and associated with Hello! Project. It was formed by Up-Front Promotion in November 1998 as Morning Musume's first sub-group. While the main group Morning Musume features predominantly upbeat songs with a fast tempo, Tanpopo featured slower tempo, sentimental and retro-style songs.

== History ==
The group was founded in November 1998, consisting of three Morning Musume members: Aya Ishiguro, Kaori Iida, and Mari Yaguchi. After the formation, the group immediately released their first single, "Last Kiss," which was used on the anime Sorcerous Stabber Orphen. The single has a "sexy" vibe that they used on their second single and first album. However, they created a fresh image when they released "Tanpopo". This new image did not become as popular as the first image they had created.

After the release of the group's fourth single, Aya Ishiguro graduated from Morning Musume and left the group. The remaining members continued performing their songs in concerts as Generation 1.5 Tanpopo.

In June 2000, Morning Musume 4th Generation members Rika Ishikawa and Ai Kago joined Tanpopo, making the two-member group a four-member group. The style of their songs changed also when the four released "Otome Pasta ni Kandō." The style of this song became analogous to the songs Morning Musume had released. They also used this style on their next singles, which became popular and reached the number one spot on Oricon, and their second (and last) album.

On July 31, 2002, it was announced that Tanpopo was going to be completely reformed. Kaori Iida, Mari Yaguchi, and Ai Kago graduated from the group and were replaced by Morning Musume 5th Generation members Asami Konno and Risa Niigaki, with Ayumi Shibata of Melon Kinenbi. This newly formed group only released one single before they went on indefinite hiatus. All members except Niigaki graduated from Hello! Project as part of the Elder Club graduation concert in early 2009, rendering the group completely inactive.

== Members ==
=== First generation ===
- Aya Ishiguro (石黒彩)
- Kaori Iida (飯田圭織)
- Mari Yaguchi (矢口真里)

=== Second generation ===
- Kaori Iida (飯田圭織; Leader)
- Mari Yaguchi (矢口真里)
- Rika Ishikawa (石川梨華)
- Ai Kago (加護亜依)

=== Third generation ===
- Rika Ishikawa (石川梨華; Leader)
- Asami Konno (紺野あさ美)
- Risa Niigaki (新垣里沙)
- Ayumi Shibata (柴田あゆみ)

== Legacy ==
In 2009, Tanpopo was revived as a Hello! Project Shuffle Unit under the name Tanpopo Sharp (タンポポ＃, Tanpopo Shāpu; stylized as Tanpopo#), with the new group consisting of Eri Kamei and Aika Mitsui of Morning Musume, Yurina Kumai of Berryz Kobo, and Chisato Okai of Cute. The sharp symbol was chosen to represent the kanji "井", which is the second character in each of the new members' surnames. The group released songs for Hello! Project's compilation albums Champloo 1: Happy Marriage Song Cover Shū and Petit Best 10.

== Discography ==
=== Albums ===
#	Title	Release date
1	Tanpopo 1	1999-03-31
2	All of Tanpopo (All of タンポポ)	2002-09-04
3	Petitmoni/Tanpopo Megabest (プッチモニ／タンポポ メガベスト)	2008-12-10

=== Singles ===
#	Title	Release date
1	"Last Kiss" (ラストキッス)	1998-11-18
2	"Motto" (もっと)	1999-03-10
3	"Tanpopo" (たんぽぽ)	1999-06-16
4	"Seinaru Kane ga Hibiku Yoru" (聖なる鐘がひびく夜)	1999-10-20
5	"Otome Pasta ni Kandō" (乙女 パスタに感動)	2000-07-05
6	"Koi o Shichaimashita!" (恋をしちゃいました!)	2001-02-21
7	"Ōjisama to Yuki no Yoru" (王子様と雪の夜)	2001-11-21
8	"Be Happy Koi no Yajirobee" (Be Happy 恋のやじろべえ)	2002-09-26

=== DVD ===
- 2004-06-16 – Tanpopo Single V Clips 1 (タンポポ シングルＶクリップス①)

== Appearances ==
=== Photobooks ===
Title	Release date	Company	ISBN
Tanpopo Photobook (タンポポPhoto Book)	2001-07-05	Wani Books	ISBN 4-8470-2654-3

=== Radio ===
Program	Radio station	Start date	End date
Tanpopo Hatake de Tsukamaete (タンポポ畑でつかまえて)	Nippon Hōsō	1999-10-09	2000-03-25
Tanpopo no Konya mo Mankai (タンポポの今夜も満開)	Nippon Hōsō	2000-03-30	2001-04-12
Tanpopo Henshuubu Oh-So-Ro! (タンポポ編集部 Oh-So-Ro!)	TBS	2000-10-03	2003-09-23
