= Last Kiss (Tanpopo song) =

"Last Kiss (ラストキッス)"

Single by Tanpopo

from the album Tanpopo 1
- Released: November 18, 1998 (JP)
- Recorded: 1998
- Genre: J-pop
- Label: Zetima Records
- Songwriter: Tsunku

Tanpopo singles chronology
"Last Kiss (ラストキッス)" (1998)	"Motto" (1999)

"Last Kiss" (ラストキッス) is the debut single of Morning Musume's first subgroup, Tanpopo. It was released on November 18, 1998, as an 8 cm CD under the Zetima Records with a catalog number, EPDE-1014. The song was later featured in the group's first album Tanpopo 1 (along with the album version of it) and in their second album All of Tanpopo. It was also featured as the first ending theme to the anime Sorcerous Stabber Orphen. It reached number two on the Japan Oricon charts.

In 2002, an English-language cover was recorded by Charlotte (from Soul II Soul) for the album Cover Morning Musume Hello! Project!.

== Track listing ==
The lyricist and composer of the songs is Tsunku. "Last Kiss" was arranged by Takao Konishi, while the B-side song was arranged by Yuichi Takahashi, with the help of LH Project.

1. "Last Kiss (Single version)"
2. "Jikan yo Tomare" (時間よ止まれ)
3. "Last Kiss (Instrumental)"

== Personnel ==
- Aya Ishiguro (石黒彩) - vocals
- Kaori Iida (飯田圭織) - vocals
- Mari Yaguchi (矢口真里) - vocals
- Takao Konishi (小西貴雄) - arranger (track 1 and 3)
- Yuichi Takahashi (高橋諭一) - arranger (track 2)
- LH Project - arranger (track 2)
