= Sengoku Collection =

2010 video game

- Cover of first DVD volume of the anime series, depicting Oda Nobunaga and Tokugawa Ieyasu

戦国コレクション (Sengoku Korekushon)
- Genre: Action, historical
- Video game
- Developer: Konami
- Publisher: Konami
- Genre: Card game
- Platform: iOS, Android, mobile
- Released: December 21, 2010
- Anime television series
- Directed by: Keiji Gotoh
- Music by: Tomoki Kikuya
- Studio: Brain's Base
- Licensed by: NA: Nozomi Entertainment
- Original network: TV Tokyo
- Original run: April 5, 2012 – September 27, 2012
- Episodes: 26

The names of characters based on historical figures are listed family name first. The names of other characters and all staff and cast members are written in standard English order.

Sengoku Collection (戦国コレクション, Sengoku Korekushon) was a mobile social networking game created by Konami, which was launched for the Mobage service in December 2010. The series features female representations of feudal lords from the Sengoku period. An anime television series adaptation produced by Brain's Base aired on TV Tokyo between April 5, 2012, and September 27, 2012.

== Plot ==
Game

The story is set in the tumultuous Sengoku Era of historical Japan, when military masters circle the figurative throne of Japan's first shogunate. In the game, "God of War Cards" have been sealed in six hidden treasures, and fighting breaks out among those who seek the treasures. As a new military master, the player embarks on a journey to obtain the treasures by clearing quests and fighting bosses.

Anime

In a different timeline, female versions of generals from the Sengoku period vie for power. One day, a mysterious light sends Oda Nobunaga and several other generals to the modern day world. As each of the generals adapts to this new lifestyle, Nobunaga goes on a quest to seek out the other generals and retrieve their secret treasures in order to return home.

== Characters ==
=== Generals ===
Sweet Little Devil Oda Nobunaga (小悪魔王・織田信長)
Voiced by: Rumi Ōkubo
The feudal lord who is mysteriously transported to the Modern World. Wanting to return to the Sengoku World, she goes on a quest to retrieve the secret treasures hidden inside the other feudal lords so that she can return home.
Vengeful Fang Akechi Mitsuhide (復讐ノ牙・明智光秀)
Voiced by: Yōko Hikasa
Nobunaga's servant who was often faithful to her. When she believed Nobunaga to be favouring Hideyoshi over her, she was consumed by jealousy and attempted to assassinate Nobunaga, causing the phenomenon that sent everyone to the Modern World. She had lost her memory upon arriving, but regained it after recovering from a coma.
Peaceful Empress Tokugawa Ieyasu (泰平女君・徳川家康)
Voiced by: Kana Hanazawa
A peace-loving feudal lord who enjoys singing and dancing. After coming to admire an idol, she becomes an idol herself.
Pure Angel Naoe Kanetsugu (純愛天使・直江兼続)
Voiced by: Mai Nakahara
Kenshin's retainer who is in love with her, wanting to fulfil her dream of conquering the land. She has wings which let her view the battlefield. When she is transported to the Modern World, she goes colorblind but regains her ability to see color when she realises how much Kenshin wants her by her side.
Holy Maiden Uesugi Kenshin (聖乙女・上杉謙信)
Voiced by: Mamiko Noto
A feudal lord who is always beside Kanetsugu. Whilst constantly battling in the Sengoku World, Kenshin came to love the peaceful modern world and became a model.
One-eyed Dragon Date Masamune (独眼竜姫・伊達政宗)
Voiced by: Ayumi Tsunematsu
A feudal lord who was often dependent on her servant, Kojūrō Katakura. Upon arriving in the Modern World, she was tricked by the Yakuza and arrested, but managed to escape and get revenge, and now seeks out Kojuro.
Sword Maiden Tsukahara Bokuden (斬神・塚原卜伝)
Voiced by: Sayuri Hara
A small and cheeky but powerful general who runs a kendo dojo.
Knowledge Master Hiraga Gennai (識神・平賀源内)
Voiced by: Haruka Kudō
A self-proclaimed genius who enjoys inventing things, hoping to make a time machine to take her to the future.
Refined Bard Matsuo Bashō (風流人・松尾芭蕉)
Voiced by: Asuka Nishi
A wandering poet who speaks only in haikus (俳句).
Regent Girl Toyotomi Hideyoshi (太閤娘・豊臣秀吉)
Voiced by: Kaori Nazuka
A carefree girl who loves to eat rice.
Ambitious Princess Hōjō Sōun (野心姫・北条早雲)
Voiced by: Ryō Hirohashi
A girl who aspires to become a general.
Brutal Maiden Matsunaga Hisahide (凶悪乙女・松永久秀)
Voiced by: Atsuko Tanaka
A con artist who carries a large scythe.
Dancing Blossom Maeda Keiji (舞桜・前田利益)
Voiced by: Masumi Asano
A maiden with a strong sense of justice. By day, she appears to be an absent-minded store clerk. However, on Saturday nights, she rides her motorbike and punishes delinquents under the guise of 'Saturday Night Rider'.
Silver Hornet Sugitani Zenjubō (銀蜂・杉谷善住坊)
Voiced by: Miyuki Sawashiro
An assassin who has never missed a target.
Gold Peony Kondō Isami (金牡丹・近藤勇)
Voiced by: Chiaki Takahashi
Novel Deciders (新撰組, Shinsengumi)
A dormitory leader of Shinsenryō (深浅寮). She has attended a boarding school for girls in the Modern World, and lives a high school girl's life for her age.
Black Bellflower Hijikata Toshizō (黒桔梗・土方歳三)
Voiced by: Akeno Watanabe
Novel Deciders (新撰組, Shinsengumi)
A sub dormitory leader of Shinsenryō. She has a habit of overusing a celebrated sword Izumi no Kami Kanesada (和泉守兼定).
White Lotus Okita Sōji (白蓮・沖田総司)
Voiced by: Akemi Kanda
Novel Deciders (新撰組, Shinsengumi)
A follower of Kondō and Hijikata lives in Shinsenryō. She looks fragile, but is really scary in reality.
Annihilate Princess Mogami Yoshiaki (殲滅姫・最上義光)
Voiced by: Sumire Uesaka
Date Masamune's young aunt, even she hates being call that, and is afraid of ghosts. She shares the same name as Ashikaga Yoshiteru's daughter, Yoshiaki (which she pointed out).
Blade Adept Ashikaga Yoshiteru (剣聖・足利義輝)
Voiced by: Rina Satō
A shogun of the Warring State and a representative of the Samurai. She has a grudge against Yagyū Sekishūsai for playing pranks on her, but in reality she really likes and admires her. She is a student of Bokuden.
Sword Maiden Yagyū Sekishūsai (斬神・柳生石舟斎)
Voiced by: Haruka Kimura
An heir of a new kind of swordsmanship and was one of Bokuken's student. She constantly play pranks on Ashikaga, but reveal that she did it to get her attention and that she admire her.
Sunshine Ruler Liu Bei (春陽愛君・劉備)
Voiced by: Yui Horie
A maid-for-hire who is inflicted with a curse which causes her to turn into a pig after sunset. The only character that comes from the Three Kingdoms Period instead of the Sengoku Period.
Four Leaves Ōtani Yoshitsugu (四ツ葉・大谷吉継)
Voiced by: Haruka Shiraishi
A quiet girl wrapped in bandages who often experiences a lot of bad luck.
Cavalry Queen Takeda Shingen (戦騎女王・武田信玄)
Voiced by: Ryōko Shintani
A famous for the Cavalry Queen in the Sengoku World who is transported to "Nakhodka" the space station of a certain country. She can wield powerful elemental attacks but is apparently bad at maths.
The Splendor Katakura Kojūrō (華麗・片倉小十郎)
Voiced by: Asami Imai
Masamune's faithful servant, but she joins police and chases Masamune.
The Dune Amago Tsunehisa (お砂場・尼子経久)
Voiced by: Eri Kitamura
A kindergarten child who has ambition to build a big castle on a sandbox.
Marshal Princess Imagawa Yoshimoto (元帥姫・今川義元)
Voiced by: Ai Shimizu
A famous warrior maiden and Oda Nobunaga's rival that lost to her, which led to her declining reputation.

=== Shrine Maidens ===
Fox Maiden (きつね巫女, Kitsune-Miko)
Voiced by: Yui Hasegawa (Sweety)
Rabbit Maiden (うさぎ巫女, Usagi-Miko)
Voiced by: Aya Takenouchi (Sweety)
Cat Maiden (ねこ巫女, Neko-Miko)
Voiced by: Rika Gaoitomo (Sweety)

=== Other characters ===
Pretty Girl Mori Ranmaru (可愛・森蘭丸)
Voiced by: Rei Matsuzaki
Nobunaga's servant.
Sword Maiden Itō Ittōsai (斬神・伊藤一刀斎)
Voiced by: Mikako Komatsu
A challenger to Bokuden for a title of the strongest.
Tea Way Sen no Rikyū (お茶道・千利休)
Voiced by: Saori Hayami
A master of tea.
Lady Teacher Taigen Sessai (女教師・太原雪斎)
Voiced by: Sakiko Kawai
Yoshimoto's servant.
Ninja Girl Fūma Kotarō (クノイチ・風魔小太郎)
Voiced by: Ami Koshimizu
Yoshimoto's servant.
Seiichi Ōta (太田 生一)
Voiced by: Kousuke Toriumi
A boy who Nobunaga encounters upon arriving in the modern world. He helps Nobunaga out before she begins her search for the hidden treasures.
Rosary (ロザリー)
Voiced by: Yuka Terasaki
The top star of singing and dancing in the modern world.
A manager (マネージャー)
Voiced by: Daisuke Hirakawa
Ieyasu's manager.
A chief (社長)
Voiced by: Binbin Takaoka
An owner of the agency that Ieyasu belongs.
Daigorō Katakura (片倉だいごろう)
Voiced by: Kōtaro Nakamura
A mafia boss who employed Masamune.
Mike Morse (マイク・モース)
Voiced by: Masashi Ebara
A documentary producer.
A boy (少年)
Voiced by: Yumi Igarashi
A boy who takes care of Gennai. Gennai calls him "Assistant".
Marie (真理恵)
Voiced by: Kimiko Saitō
A barkeeper of Saihate Cafe (さいはてカフェ).
Ai (亜衣)
Voiced by: Ai Nonaka
Marie's daughter.
Satoshi (さとし)
Voiced by: Shūhei Sakaguchi
A dancer of shemale who teaches dance in the cafe.
Kyōichi (恭一)
Voiced by: Hisayoshi Suganuma
An artist of the cafe's regular customer.
Noriko (紀子)
Voiced by: Ikumi Hayama
An elementary school girl who lives with Hideyoshi.
Human Rice (米人間)
Voiced by: Kōsuke Kobayashi, Yōhei Azakami, Hiroshi Shimozaki
The people in the wonderland who has the shape of a grain of rice.
A scarecrow (かかし)
Voiced by: Takeshi Mori
A talking scarecrow in the wonderland.
Jun Takahashi (高橋純)
Voiced by: Kanako Kondō
An ordinary high school girl who lives with Sōun.
Teacher Matsuura (松浦先生)
Voiced by: Risa Mizuno
A female teacher.
Sarah (サラ)
Voiced by: Yū Shimamura
An ambassador's daughter who relies on Hisahide to ruin the casino.
Yamaguchi (山口)
Voiced by: Hitomi Nabatame
A serious woman who works with Keiji in a convenience store.
Ageha (アゲハ)
Voiced by: Kana Ueda
A homeless girl who came up to Tokyo from the country. Zenjubō's first friend in the modern world.
Mao (真緒)
Voiced by: Mai Kadowaki
Yoshiaki's classmate.
Yumi (由美)
Voiced by: Manami Numakura
Yoshiaki's classmate.
Murata (村田)
Voiced by: Chigusa Ikeda
Yoshiaki's classmate.
Tae Kasuga (春日タエ)
Voiced by: Sayuri Sadaoka
An elderly former actress who employs Liu Bei to a maid.
Angel (エンジェル)
Voiced by: Tomosa Murata
Yoshitsugu's pen friend.
Inspector Hirata (平田警部)
Voiced by: Takashi Nagasako
The chief investigator of the murder case who is Akechi's acquaintance.
Всад29 (Всадник) (フサード29, Fusādonīkyū)
Voiced by: Tōru Ōkawa
An old-type support droid which is a shape of an electric water boiler, and has a face doodling and a message on his top. He can move independently by wheels or jets, and work by a manipulator inside him.
Весна9000 (ヴィスナー9000, Visunā9000)
Voiced by: Takako Honda
A perfect AI which rises in revolt against humans.
Higurashi (日暮)
Voiced by: Daisuke Endō
A police detective who arrested Masamune. After that, he joins the Sengoku Busho Countermaersure Department and chase Masamune who became a prison breaker, with Kojūrō.
Shimizu-kun (清水くん)
Voiced by: Hitomi Hase
A kindergarten child who is polite and honest. Tsunehisa finds out his talent for assisting the king, and he placed himself under her order.
Matsuda-kun (松田くん)
Voiced by: Yukari Kokubun
A kindergarten child who is a leader of Matsuda-kun group.
Enya-kun (塩谷くん)
Voiced by: Mariya Ise
A kindergarten child who is a leader of Enya-kun group.
Misawa-chan (三沢ちゃん)
Voiced by: Rie Kugimiya
A kindergarten child who is a leader of Misawa-chan group.
A female manager (女子マネージャー)
Voiced by: Tamari Hinata
Ieyasu's new manager who is an able woman but so severe.
Kaoru Taniyama (谷山薫)
Voiced by: Tsubasa Yonaga
A fan of Ieyasu who takes peeping videos her. He was given an accusation video from a lady, and runs away with Ieyasu from the chasers who aim for the camera.
Tatsuya Sugimura (杉村達也)
Voiced by: Kenyū Horiuchi
An outstanding actor who co-stars with Ieyasu in a drama.
A lady of red dress (赤いドレスの女)
Voiced by: Satomi Arai
A lady wearing a red dress who collided with Kaoru. She recorded a video that accuses Tatsuya Sugimura but was killed by a syndicate.
Beethoven (ベートーベン)
Voiced by: You Kikkawa
A girl that just arrived to the modern world of Japan.

== Media ==
=== Game ===
The Sengoku Collection social game launched for mobile devices via Yahoo!'s Mobage service in December 2010. The game is a card battle game in which players can collect up to 600 trading cards in order to become a Shogun general. The game has had over 2.5 million registered users.

=== Anime ===
An anime adaptation by Brain's Base aired in Japan on TV Tokyo between April 5, 2012, and September 27, 2012, and was also simulcast on Crunchyroll. For the first 13 episodes, the opening theme is "Close Your Eyes and Hold Me" (目をとじてギュッしよ, Me o Tojite Gyusshiyo) by Abcho whilst the ending theme is "Unlucky Girl!!" by Sweety. For episode 14 onwards, the opening theme is "Back Into My World" by Sweety, whilst the ending theme is "Darling and Madonna" (ダーリンとマドンナ, Dārin to Madonna) by You Kikkawa. Insert songs used in episode 2 are "Love Scope" by Kana Hanazawa and "Misty Moon" by Yuka Terasaki. Right Stuf Inc. has licensed the series for DVD and digital release in North America in 2014 under its Lucky Penny label.
