= Tanpopo 1 =

Studio album by Tanpopo
- Released: March 31, 1999
- Genre: J-pop
- Label: Zetima
- Producer: Tsunku

Tanpopo chronology
Tanpopo 1 (1999)	All of Tanpopo (2002)

Tanpopo 1 is the first album from the Japanese pop idol group Tanpopo. It was released March 31, 1999 with the catalog number EPCE-5017.

It contains at least one version of three A-sides, and six new songs.

== Track listing ==
1. "Last Kiss (Single Version)" (ラストキッス)
2. "Wakatte nai ja nai" (わかってないじゃない)
3. "Sentimental Minamimuki" (センチメンタル南向き)
4. "Motto (Album Mix)"
5. "Tanjoubi no Asa" (誕生日の朝)
6. "Kataomoi" (片想い)
7. "One Step"
8. "Tanpopo" (たんぽぽ)
9. "Suki" (スキ)
10. "Last Kiss (Album Version)" (ラストキッス)
