= Seinaru Kane ga Hibiku Yoru =

Single by Tanpopo

from the album Tanpopo 1
- Released: October 20, 1999 (JP)
- Recorded: 1999
- Genre: J-pop
- Label: Zetima
- Producer: Tsunku

Tanpopo singles chronology
| "Tanpopo" (1999) | "Seinaru Kane ga Hibiku Yoru" (1999) | "Otome Pasta ni Kandō" (2000) |

Seinaru Kane ga Hibiku Yoru (聖なる鐘がひびく夜; "Holy Bell Resounding Through the Night") is the fourth single of Morning Musume subgroup Tanpopo. It was released on October 20, 1999, as an 8 cm CD, and peaked at #2 on the weekly Oricon charts, charting for twelve weeks and selling 86,090 copies in its first week. The first press edition contained a special trading card.

It is the only Tanpopo single that doesn't have a B-side track and an instrumental, which are standards for Hello! Project singles. Instead, it includes three solo versions of the songs, sung by the first generation line-up of the group.

In 2002, an English-language cover ("My Love (Holy Night)") was recorded by Lalah Hathaway for the album Cover Morning Musume Hello! Project!.

== Track listing ==
All tracks are written by Tsunku, arranged by Takao Konishi.

| No. | Title | Length |
|---|---|---|
| 1. | "Seinaru Kane ga Hibiku Yoru" (聖なる鐘がひびく夜, "Holy Bell Resounding Through the Night") |
| 2. | "Seinaru Kane ga Hibiku Yoru (featuring Iida)" |
| 3. | "Seinaru Kane ga Hibiku Yoru (featuring Ishiguro)" |
| 4. | "Seinaru Kane ga Hibiku Yoru (featuring Yaguchi)" |

== Members at the time of single ==
- Aya Ishiguro (石黒彩)
- Kaori Iida (飯田圭織)
- Mari Yaguchi (矢口真里)
