= Motto (Tanpopo song) =

Single by Tanpopo

from the album Tanpopo 1
- Released: March 10, 1999 (JP)
- Recorded: 1999
- Genre: J-pop
- Label: Zetima Records
- Producer: Tsunku

Tanpopo singles chronology
"Last Kiss" (1998)	"'Motto'" (1999)	"Tanpopo" (1999)

"Motto" (More) is the second single of the subgroup Tanpopo. It was released on March 10, 1999, as an 8 cm CD and reached number seven on the Japan Oricon charts. A remix version of this song was made and was featured on the group's first album, Tanpopo 1.

== Track listing ==
The lyricist and composer of the songs is Tsunku. "Motto" was arranged by Shin Kohno, while Takao Konishi arranged the b-side song.

1. "Motto"
2. "Ai no Uta" (愛の唄, Love Song)
3. "Motto (Instrumental)"

== Members at the time of single ==
- Aya Ishiguro (石黒彩)
- Kaori Iida (飯田圭織)
- Mari Yaguchi (矢口真里)

== Musical Personnel ==
=== Motto ===
- Aya Ishiguro - vocals
- Kaori Iida - vocals
- Mari Yaguchi - vocals
- Hiram Bullock - guitar
- Sean C - turntable
- Bashiri Johnson - percussion
- Shin Kohno (河野伸) - keyboards/arranger
- Will Lee - bass
- Chris Parker - drums
- Tsunku - additional vocals

=== Ai no Uta ===
- Aya Ishiguro - vocals
- Kaori Iida - vocals
- Mari Yaguchi - vocals
- Go Katsuura (勝浦剛) - manipulator
- Takao Konishi - keyboards/arranger
- Susumu Nishikawa (西川進) - guitar
- Ken Shima - Wurlitzer
