= Rika Ishikawa =

Japanese actress and model (born 1985)

Rika Ishikawa 石川 梨華
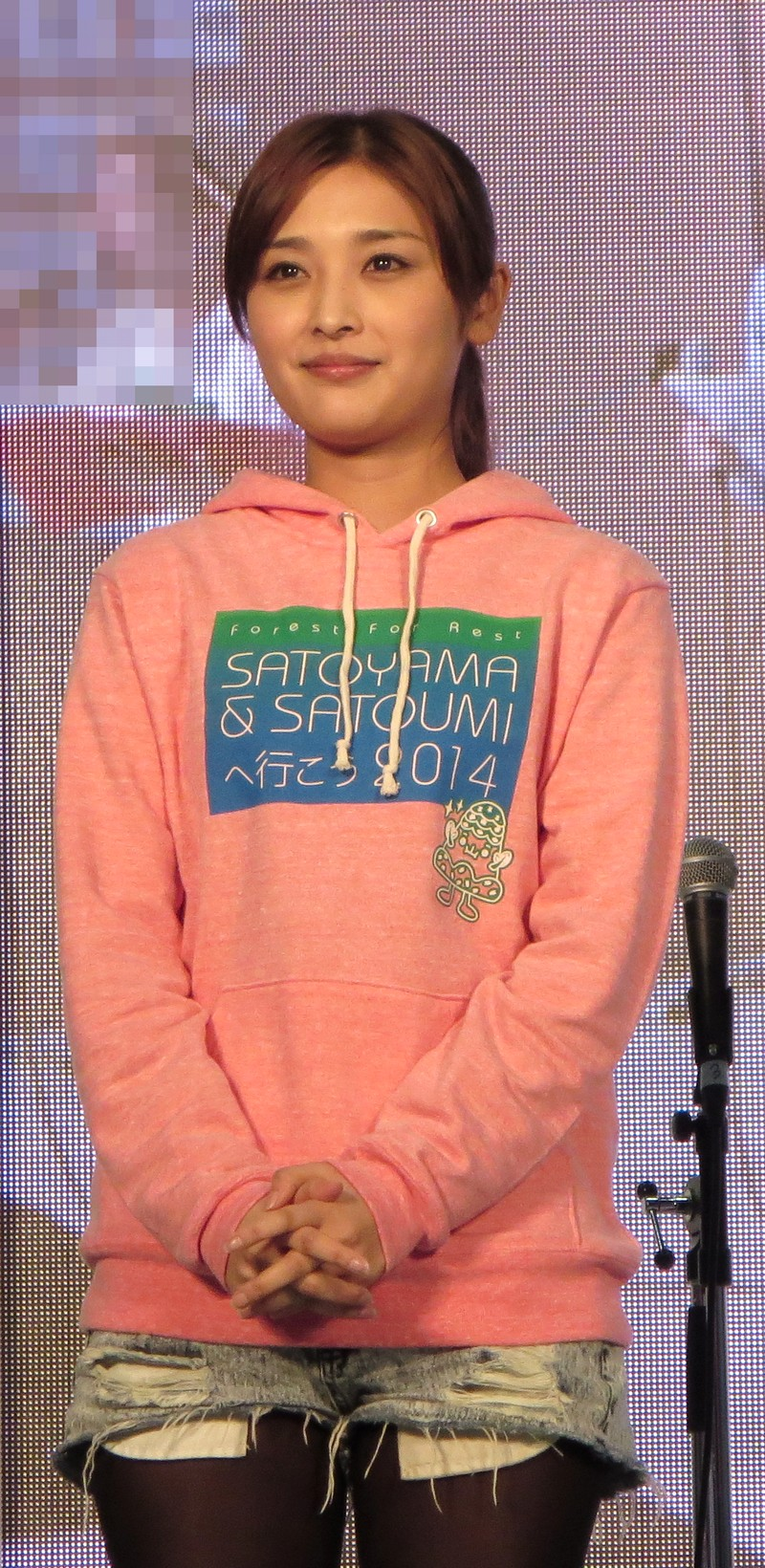
- In 2014

Background information
- Also known as: Rika Nogami (After marriage)
- Born: January 19, 1985 (age 41); Yokosuka, Kanagawa, Japan
- Occupations: Singer; Actress; Model; Dancer
- Musical career
- Genre: J-pop
- Years active: 2000–present
- Labels: Zetima; Piccolo Town
- Website: UP-FRONT AGENCY

Rika Ishikawa (石川 梨華, Ishikawa Rika; born January 19, 1985), is a Japanese actress and model associated with Hello! Project and best known as a former member of the pop group Morning Musume. She was the leader of the Japanese pop idol trio V-u-den until June 2008. She has performed as a solo singer, as a member of the Japanese pop idol group Ongaku Gatas, in the pop duo Hangry & Angry as Angry, and as a member of Dream Morning Musume.

== Biography ==
=== Career ===
Rika Ishikawa was born on January 19, 1985, in Yokosuka, Kanagawa, Japan.

Ishikawa joined Morning Musume as a fourth generation member along with Hitomi Yoshizawa, Nozomi Tsuji, and Ai Kago, and made her debut in 2000 along with the rest of the fourth generation on the band's tenth single, "Happy Summer Wedding".

In 2001, simultaneously with her Morning Musume obligations, Ishikawa became a featured member of the Hello! Project pop group Country Musume and a second-generation member of Morning Musume's first subgroup, Tanpopo. She also participated in her first shuffle group, 3-nin Matsuri, with fellow Morning Musume/Tanpopo member Ai Kago and solo singer Aya Matsuura (previously, she had acted as a replacement member in the 2000 shuffle group Aoiro 7).

One of Ishikawa's most referenced vocal parts during her Morning Musume days was a spoken-word piece in the 2003 single "Shabondama". She also performed a spoken-word piece at the end of the song "The Peace!".

In September 2004, her new trio, V-u-den, released their debut single. She graduated from Morning Musume on May 7, 2005, and after five singles, V-u-den finally released their debut album, Suiteroom Number 1, in November 2005.

Ishikawa has starred in a Hamtaro movie with her Ecomoni partner, Sayumi Michishige, and soloist Aya Matsuura. She was a Pocky Girl (for Morning Musume's Pocky commercial), and also plays for Gatas Brilhantes H.P.

Ishikawa graduated from Morning Musume on the last day of the Morning Musume Concert Tour 2005 Haru ~Dai 6 Kan Hit Mankai!~, on May 7, 2005. During this concert, 7th generation member Koharu Kusumi was officially introduced into Morning Musume in her place. After her graduation, she replaced Yuko Nakazawa as the host of Hello!Morning till it ended in 2007.

Ishikawa starred in Sukeban Deka: Codename = Asamiya Saki, the fourth live-action adaptation film of Sukeban Deka, opposite Aya Matsuura, released September 30, 2006.

In line with Mari Yaguchi's involvement in the Japanese 2007 adaptation of the popular 1955 Broadway play, Damn Yankees, Rika was double cast with fellow 4th Generation ex-Morning Musume member Nozomi Tsuji in "When Will You Return?" (『いつの日君帰る』, Itsu no hi kimi kaeru) in 2007 at the Nissei Theatre in Tokyo and the Osaka City Center.

In mid-2007, Ishikawa joined the Japanese idol group Ongaku Gatas along with fellow members of Gatas Brilhantes H.P..

On October 12, 2008, it was announced that she would pair with fellow ex-Morning Musume member Hitomi Yoshizawa in the new unit Hangry & Angry in collaboration with a Harajuku fashion store of the same name. Hangry & Angry made their first United States performance at Sakura-Con in Seattle, Washington in April 2009.

Ishikawa graduated from Hello! Project with the rest of Elder Club on March 31, 2009. Ishikawa joined the newly formed group, "Dream Morning Musume" in 2010 alongside other former Morning Musume members.

On January 1, 2010, Ishikawa opened up an official blog.

== Personal life ==
On March 13, 2017, she married a professional baseball player, Ryoma Nogami and gave birth to a baby boy in April 2018. He was followed by another boy in January 2020.

== Groups ==
=== Hello! Project ===
- Ongaku Gatas (2007 – 2010)
- Ecomoni (2004 – 2007)
- V-u-den (2004 – 2008)
- Def.Diva (2005 – 2006)
- Morning Musume (2000 – 2005)
  - Morning Musume Otomegumi (2003 – 2004)
- Tanpopo (2000 – 2003)
- Country Musume ni Ishikawa Rika (Morning Musume) (2001 – 2003)
- Romans (2003)
- Shuffle Groups
  - 3-nin Matsuri (2001)
  - Sexy 8 (2002)
  - 7Air (2003)
  - H.P. All Stars (2004)

=== Non-Hello! Project ===
- Hangry & Angry (2008 – 2011)
- Dream Morning Musume (2011 – 2012)
- Abcho (2012)

== Releases ==
=== Photobooks ===
#	Title	Release date	Publisher ISBN	Description
1	Ishikawa Rika Shashinshū - Rika Ishikawa (石川梨華写真集 Rika Ishikawa)	August 3, 2001	Takeshobo; ISBN 978-4-8124-0791-2	First solo photobook
2	Ishikawa Rika Shashinshū" (石川梨華写真集)	June 22, 2002	Wani Books; ISBN 978-4-8470-2717-8	Second solo photobook
3	Ishikawa Rika Shashinshū - "I" (石川梨華写真集「I」)	December 24, 2003	Wani Books; ISBN 978-4-8470-2787-1	Third solo photobook
–	"Seishun Haka-san Ryōri Jyuku" & "17sai ~Tabidachi no Futari~" Visual Book ( 「青春ばかちん料理塾」&「17才～旅立ちのふたり」ビジュアルブック)	August 8, 2003	Kodansha; ISBN 978-4-06-364523-1	Photobook of the movie Seventeen
–	Pocket Morning Musume Vol.1 (ポケットモーニング娘。〈Vol.1〉)	September 2003	Rokusaisha; ISBN 978-4-8463-0525-3	Fourth Generation member pocket photobook
4	Ishikawa Rika Shashinshū "Hanabi" (1石川梨華写真集「華美」)	December 10, 2004	Wani Books; ISBN 978-4-8470-2836-6	Fourth solo photobook
5	Ishikawa Rika Shiawase no Ashi Ato Happy (フォト&エッセイ「石川梨華 幸せのあしあと ハッピー!」)	July 1, 2005	Kobunsha; ISBN 978-4-334-90127-1	Photo and Essay book
–	Ishikawa Rika & Michishige Sayumi; Shashinshū "Angels" (石川梨華&道重さゆみ写真集「エンジェルズ」)	November 16, 2005	Wani Books; ISBN 978-4-8470-2895-3	Duo photobook with Sayumi Michishige
6	Ishikawa Shashinshū "Oui, mon amour" ( 石川梨華写真集「Oui, mon amour」)	December 18, 2006	Wani Books; ISBN 978-4-8470-2981-3	Sixth solo photobook
–	Rika Ishikawa Hello! Project 2007 Winter Concert	January 28, 2007	— —	Concert photobook
7	Ishikawa Rika Shashinshū "Abyuu" (石川梨華写真集「アビュー」)	August 22, 2007	Wani Books; ISBN 978-4-8470-4032-0	Seventh solo photobook
8	Ishikawa Rika Shashinshū "Kazahana" (石川梨華写真集「風華」)	February 20, 2008	Kids Net; ISBN 978-4-04-895014-5	Eighth solo photobook
9	Ishikawa Rika Shashinshū "Karen" (石川梨華写真集「華恋(かれん)」)	January 19, 2009	Wani Books; ISBN 978-4-8470-4151-8	Ninth solo photobook

=== DVDs ===
Title	Release date	Charts
Title	Release date	JP
Rika & Miki Sugao no 17sai ~Making Of «17sai ~Tabidachi no Futari~»~ (梨華&美貴 素顔の17才 ～メイキングオブ「17才 旅立ちのふたり」～)	21 October 2003	?
17sai ~Tabidachi no Futari~ (17才 旅立ちのふたり)	21 April 2004	?
Alo Hello! Rika Ishikawa (アロハロ!石川梨華)	7 March 2007	20
Rika Ishikawa MOST CRISIS! in Hawaii	11 February 2009	24
RIKA (石川梨華 RIKA)	6 January 2010	170

== Acts ==
=== Television ===
Show	Start date	End date
Haikara-san ga Tōru	January 2, 2002	
Tō-san no Natsu Matsuri	August 17, 2002	
Ore ga Aitsu de Aitsu ga Ore de	December 28, 2002	
Ranpo R Jigoku Dōkeshi	February 23, 2003	
Last Present	December 24, 2003	
Majokko Rika-chan no Magical v-u-den (魔女っ娘。梨華ちゃんのマジカル美勇伝)	October 4, 2004	December 24, 2004
Shinshun Wide Jidaigeki "Kunitori Monogatari"	January 2, 2005	
Musume Dokyu! (娘Dokyu!)	May 9, 2005	
Shin Dōmoto Kyōdai (新堂本兄弟)	June 18, 2006	

=== Radio ===
Program	Start date	End date
MBS Young Town Dōyōbi	April 3, 2003	March 27, 2004
v-u-den☆Ishikawa Rika no Chanka☆Charmy!	April 2, 2004	September 21, 2006
Hello Pro Yanen!!	February 18, 2005	March 11, 2005
B.B.L.	April 3, 2005	April 10, 2005
B.B.L.	May 8, 2005	Currently running
v-u-den Beauty Hour 21	October 6, 2006	–

=== Movies ===
- 2000 – Pinch Runner
- 2002 – Tokkaekko
- 2003 – Koinu Dan no Monogatari
- 2003 – 17sai ~Tabidachi no Futari~
- 2004 – Tottoko Hamtaro Hamu Hamu Hapa Radaicho!
- 2006 – Yo-Yo Girl Cop

=== Commercials ===
- Eeruseeme
- 2003 – J Beef "Oniku Suki Suki"
