= Chu Chu Chu Bokura no Mirai / Dai Jinsei Never Been Better! =

Single by Morning Musume

from the album Morning Musume Best Selection ~The 25 Shuunen~
- Language: Japanese
- English title: Chu Chu Chu Bokura no Mirai / Great Life, Never Been Better!
- Released: June 8, 2022
- Recorded: 2022
- Genre: J-pop
- Label: Zetima
- Songwriter(s): Tsunku
- Composer(s): Tsunku
- Producer(s): Tsunku

singles from Morning Musume singles chronology
"Teenage Solution / Yoshi Yoshi Shite Hoshii no / Beat no Wakusei" (2021)	"Chu Chu Chu Bokura no Mirai / Dai Jinsei Never Been Better!" (2022)	"Swing Swing Paradise / Happy Birthday to Me!" (2022)

Music video
- 「Chu Chu Chu 僕らの未来」 「大だい・人生 Never Been Better!」: YouTube

"Chu Chu Chu Bokura no Mirai / Dai Jinsei Never Been Better!" (Chu Chu Chu 僕らの未来/大だい・人生 Never Been Better!) is Morning Musume's 71st single.

== Information ==
This was the last single to feature 14th generation member Chisaki Morito. The version of I Wish included as an additional track in the Limited Edition SP was recorded by the Morning Musume '22 lineup and it was released digitally on March 18, 2022.

== Featured lineup ==
- 9th generation: Mizuki Fukumura, Erina Ikuta
- 10th generation: Ayumi Ishida
- 11th generation: Sakura Oda
- 12th generation: Miki Nonaka, Maria Makino, Akane Haga
- 13th generation: Kaede Kaga, Reina Yokoyama
- 14th generation: Chisaki Morito
- 15th generation: Rio Kitagawa, Homare Okamura, Mei Yamazaki

=== Chu Chu Chu Bokura no Mirai Vocalist ===
Main Voc: Chisaki Morito

Center Voc: Mizuki Fukumura, Reina Yokoyama

Minor Voc: Erina Ikuta, Ayumi Ishida, Sakura Oda, Miki Nonaka, Maria Makino, Akane Haga, Kaede Kaga, Rio Kitagawa, Homare Okamura, Mei Yamazaki

=== Dai Jinsei Never Been Better! Vocalist ===
Main Voc: Mizuki Fukumura

Center Voc: Sakura Oda, Miki Nonaka, Maria Makino, Akane Haga, Kaede Kaga, Reina Yokoyama, Rio Kitagawa, Homare Okamura, Mei Yamazaki

Minor Voc: Erina Ikuta, Ayumi Ishida, Chisaki Morito

== Track listing ==
=== CD ===
Limited Editions A-B, Regular Editions

- Chu Chu Chu Bokura no Mirai
- Dai・Jinsei Never Been Better!
- Chu Chu Chu Bokura no Mirai (Instrumental)
- Dai・Jinsei Never Been Better! (Instrumental)

Limited Edition SP

- Chu Chu Chu Bokura no Mirai
- Dai・Jinsei Never Been Better!
- I WISH (Additional Track)
- Chu Chu Chu Bokura no Mirai (Instrumental)
- Dai・Jinsei Never Been Better! (Instrumental)

Limited Edition A Blu-ray

- Chu Chu Chu Bokura no Mirai (Music Video)
- Chu Chu Chu Bokura no Mirai (Dance Shot Ver.)
- Chu Chu Chu Bokura no Mirai (Making Eizou)

Limited Edition B Blu-ray

- Dai・Jinsei Never Been Better! (Music Video)
- Dai・Jinsei Never Been Better! (Dance Shot Ver.)
- Dai・Jinsei Never Been Better! (Making Eizou)

Limited Edition SP Blu-ray

- I WISH (Music Video)
- I WISH (Dance Shot Ver.)
- I WISH (Making Eizou)

== Charts ==
Chart (2022)	Peak position
Oricon Daily Chart	1
Oricon Weekly Chart	2
Oricon Monthly Chart	3
Top Singles Sales (Billboard Japan)	2
