= Teenage Solution / Yoshi Yoshi Shite Hoshii no / Beat no Wakusei =

Single by Morning Musume

from the album Morning Musume Best Selection ~The 25 Shuunen~
- Language: Japanese
- English title: Teenage Solution / I Want You To Tell Me It's Alright / Beat Planet
- Released: December 8, 2021
- Recorded: 2021
- Genre: J-pop
- Label: Zetima
- Songwriter(s): Tsunku
- Composer(s): Tsunku
- Producer(s): Tsunku

singles from Morning Musume singles chronology
"Junjou Evidence / Gyuusaretai Dake na no ni" (2020)	"Teenage Solution / Yoshi Yoshi Shite Hoshii no / Beat no Wakusei" (2021)	"Chu Chu Chu Bokura no Mirai / Dai Jinsei Never Been Better!" (2022)

Music video
- 「Teenage Solution」 「よしよししてほしいの」 「ビートの惑星」: YouTube

"Teenage Solution / Yoshi Yoshi Shite Hoshii no / Beat no Wakusei" (Teenage Solution/よしよししてほしいの/ビートの惑星) is Morning Musume's 70th single.

== Information ==
This was the last single to feature 10th generation member Masaki Satou.

== Featured lineup ==
- 9th generation: Mizuki Fukumura, Erina Ikuta
- 10th generation: Ayumi Ishida, Masaki Sato
- 11th generation: Sakura Oda
- 12th generation: Miki Nonaka, Maria Makino, Akane Haga
- 13th generation: Kaede Kaga, Reina Yokoyama
- 14th generation: Chisaki Morito
- 15th th generation: Rio Kitagawa, Homare Okamura, Mei Yamazaki

Teenage Solution Vocalists

Main Voc: Mizuki Fukumura, Masaki Sato, Sakura Oda

Center Voc: Miki Nonaka, Maria Makino, Kaede Kaga, Rio Kitagawa, Mei Yamazaki

Minor Voc: Erina Ikuta, Ayumi Ishida, Akane Haga, Reina Yokoyama, Chisaki Morito, Homare Okamura

Yoshi Yoshi Shite Hoshii no Vocalists

Main Voc: Mizuki Fukumura, Masaki Sato, Sakura Oda

Minor Voc: Erina Ikuta, Ayumi Ishida, Miki Nonaka, Maria Makino, Akane Haga, Kaede Kaga, Reina Yokoyama, Chisaki Morito, Rio Kitagawa, Homare Okamura, Mei Yamazaki

Beat no Wakusei Vocalist

Main Voc: Ayumi Ishida, Miki Nonaka, Kaede Kaga

Center Voc: Mizuki Fukumura, Erina Ikuta, Masaki Sato, Akane Haga, Reina Yokoyama, Chisaki Morito, Rio Kitagawa, Homare Okamura, Mei Yamazaki

Minor Voc: Sakura Oda, Maria Makino

== Track listing ==
=== CD ===
==== Limited Editions A-C, SP2, Regular Editions ====
Teenage Solution Yoshi Yoshi Shite Hoshii no Beat no Wakusei Teenage Solution (Instrumental) Yoshi Yoshi Shite Hoshii no (Instrumental) Beat no Wakusei (Instrumental)

=== Limited Edition SP1 ===
Teenage Solution Yoshi Yoshi Shite Hoshii no Beat no Wakusei Joshi Kashimashi Monogatari (Morning Musume '21 Ver.) Teenage Solution (Instrumental) Yoshi Yoshi Shite Hoshii no (Instrumental) Beat no Wakusei (Instrumental) Joshi Kashimashi Monogatari (Morning Musume '21 Ver.) (Instrumental)

=== Limited Edition A Blu-ray ===
Teenage Solution (Music Video) Teenage Solution (Dance Shot Ver.) Teenage Solution (Making Video)

=== Limited Edition B Blu-ray ===
Yoshi Yoshi Shite Hoshii no (Music Video) Yoshi Yoshi Shite Hoshii no (Dance Shot Ver.) Yoshi Yoshi Shite Hoshii no (Making Video)

=== Limited Edition C Blu-ray ===
Beat no Wakusei (Close-Up Ver.) Teenage Solution (feat. Sato Masaki Ver.) Yoshi Yoshi Shite Hoshii no (feat. Sato Masaki Ver.)

=== Single V "Beat no Wakusei" ===
Beat no Wakusei (Music Video) Beat no Wakusei (Dance Shot Ver.) Beat no Wakusei (Dance Shot Ver. II) Beat no Wakusei (Making Video)

== Charts ==
=== Oricon ===
Daily and weekly peak positions

Daily chart	Weekly chart	Sales
2	2	131,090

Monthly

Year	Month	Month rank	Sales
2021	December	4	129,288

=== Billboard Japan Top Single Sales ===
Week rank	Sales
2	151,068
