= Jinsei Blues / Seishun Night =

Single by Morning Musume '19

from the album 16th ~That's J-POP~
- Language: Japanese
- English title: Life Blues / Youthful Night
- Released: June 12; September 14, 2019 (Event V)
- Recorded: 2019
- Genre: J-pop
- Label: Zetima
- Songwriter: Tsunku
- Composer: Tsunku
- Producer: Tsunku

singles from Morning Musume singles chronology
| "Furari Ginza / Jiyū na Kuni Dakara" (2018) | "Jinsei Blues / Seishun Night" (2019) | "Kokoro & Karada / Lovepedia / Ningen Kankei No Way Way" (2020) |

Music video
- "Jinsei Blues" on YouTube

"Jinsei Blues / Seishun Night" (人生Blues/青春Night) is the 67th single from the Japanese girl group Morning Musume. It was released on June 12, 2019, in five editions: two regular and three limited.

== Production ==
The single was announced at a concert of the group's spring tour that took place in Hokkaido, and this is the first since 2011 to not include Haruna Iikubo as a member of the group, but in the music video for "Jinsei Blues" it does a cameo, and the last one to be released in the 2010s.

YOSHIKO made the dance for "Jinsei Blues" robotic and clock-like because the intro reminded her of Disney's Electrical Parade. She also added a "jinsei pose" of the 人 (hito) kanji in the chorus. The choreography for "Seishun Night" was changed several times. The first version was only performed at Hello! Project 20th Anniversary!! Hello! Project Hina Fes 2019. Afterwards, gradual changes were made to parts of the dance throughout the first half of Morning Musume '19's spring concert tour. The final version, which was a completely new dance, was first performed in Fukuoka on April 27, 2019.

== Track listing ==
=== CD ===
1. Jinsei Blues
2. Seishun Night
3. Jinsei Blues (Instrumental)
4. Seishun Night (Instrumental)

=== Limited edition A DVD ===
1. Jinsei Blues (Music Video)

=== Limited edition B DVD ===
1. Seishun Night (Music Video)

=== Limited edition SP DVD ===
1. Jinsei Blues (Dance Shot Ver.)
2. Seishun Night (Dance Shot Ver.)

=== Event V ===
1. Jinsei Blues (Close-up Ver.)
2. Seishun Night (Close-up Ver.)

== Members ==
- 9th generation: Mizuki Fukumura, Erina Ikuta
- 10th generation: Ayumi Ishida, Masaki Sato
- 11th generation: Sakura Oda
- 12th generation: Miki Nonaka, Maria Makino, Akane Haga
- 13th generation: Kaede Kaga, Reina Yokoyama
- 14th generation: Chisaki Morito

== Charts ==
| Chart | Peak position | Total sales |
|---|---|---|
| Oricon Daily | 1 | 124,536 |
| Oricon Weekly | 3 | 124,536 |
| Billboard Japan Top Singles Sales | 3 | 166,222 |
