= Kokoro & Karada / Lovepedia / Ningen Kankei No Way Way =

Single by Morning Musume '20

from the album 16th ~That's J-POP~
- Language: Japanese
- English title: MIND&BODY / LOVEpedia / Personal Relationships No way way
- Released: January 22, 2020
- Recorded: 2020
- Genre: J-pop
- Label: Zetima
- Songwriter(s): Tsunku
- Composer(s): Tsunku
- Producer(s): Tsunku

singles from Morning Musume singles chronology
| "Jinsei Blues / Seishun Night" (2019) | "Kokoro & Karada / Lovepedia / Ningen Kankei No Way Way" (2020) | "Junjou Evidence / Gyuusaretai Dake na no ni" (2020) |

Music video
- 「KOKORO&KARADA」 「LOVEペディア」 「人間関係No way way」: YouTube

"Kokoro & Karada / Lovepedia / Ningen Kankei No Way Way" (KOKORO&KARADA/LOVEペディア/人間関係No way way) is the 68th single from the Japanese girl group Morning Musume. It was released on January 22, 2020.

== Information ==
This was the debut single for 15th generation members Rio Kitagawa, Homare Okamura, and Mei Yamazaki. Both "Lovepedia" and "Ningen Kankei No Way Way" are written by Kodama Ameko and composed by Ooyagi Hiroo. Although the melody is the same, the lyrics, the arrangement, dance, and even the part division of the song are different.

== Featured lineup ==
- 9th generation: Mizuki Fukumura, Erina Ikuta
- 10th generation: Ayumi Ishida, Masaki Sato
- 11th generation: Sakura Oda
- 12th generation: Miki Nonaka, Maria Makino, Akane Haga
- 13th generation: Kaede Kaga, Reina Yokoyama
- 14th generation: Chisaki Morito
- 15th generation: Rio Kitagawa, Homare Okamura, Mei Yamazaki

Kokoro & Karada Vocalists

Main Voc: Mizuki Fukumura, Masaki Sato, Sakura Oda

Minor Voc: Erina Ikuta, Ayumi Ishida, Miki Nonaka, Maria Makino, Akane Haga, Kaede Kaga, Reina Yokoyama, Chisaki Morito, Rio Kitagawa, Homare Okamura, Mei Yamazaki

Lovepedia Vocalists

Main Voc: Maria Makino, Kaede Kaga, Reina Yokoyama, Mei Yamazaki

Center Voc: Erina Ikuta, Ayumi Ishida, Miki Nonaka, Akane Haga, Rio Kitagawa, Homare Okamura

Minor Voc: Mizuki Fukumura, Masaki Sato, Sakura Oda, Chisaki Morito

Ningen Kankei No Way Way Vocalists

Main Voc: Mizuki Fukumura, Masaki Sato, Sakura Oda, Miki Nonaka, Akane Haga, Kaede Kaga, Reina Yokoyama

Center Voc: Erina Ikuta, Ayumi Ishida, Maria Makino, Rio Kitagawa

Minor Voc: Chisaki Morito, Homare Okamura, Mei Yamazaki

== Track listing ==
=== CD ===
1. Kokoro & Karada
2. Lovepedia
3. Ningen Kankei No Way Way
4. Kokoro & Karada (Instrumental)
5. Lovepedia (Instrumental)
6. Ningen Kankei No Way Way (Instrumental)

=== Limited Edition A DVD ===
1. Kokoro & Karada (Music Video)

=== Limited Edition B DVD ===
1. Lovepedia (Music Video)

=== Limited Edition C DVD ===
1. Ningen Kankei No Way Way (Music Video)

=== Limited Edition SP DVD ===
1. Kokoro & Karada (Dance Shot Ver.)
2. Lovepedia (Dance Shot Ver.)
3. Ningen Kankei No Way Way (Dance Shot Ver.)

=== Event V ===
1. Kokoro & Karada (Close-up Ver.)
2. Lovepedia (Close-up Ver.)
3. Ningen Kankei No Way Way (Close-up Ver.)

== Charts Positions ==
=== Oricon ===
==== Daily and Weekly ====
| Mo | Tu | Wed | Thu | Fri | Sat | Sun | Weekly | Sales |
|---|---|---|---|---|---|---|---|---|
| | 2 106,693 | 2 9,384 | 2 3,801 | 4 | 4 | 2 2,697 | 2 | 126,884 |
| 10 | | 4 | 25 | 22 | | 26 | 16 | 5,223 |
| | | 5 | | | | | 14 | 2,386 |
| | 14 | | | | | | 45 | 1,100 |
| | | | | | | | 118 | 294 |
| | | | | | | | 153 | 210 |
| | | | | | | | 165 | 158 |
| | | | | | | | 161 | 135 |
| | | | | | | | Out for 4 weeks. | |
| | | | | | | | 190 | 57 |
| | | | | | | | Out for 16 weeks. | |
| | | | | | | | 189 | 85 |

=== Billboard Japan Top Single Sales ===
| Week Rank | Sales |
|---|---|
| 3 | 194,972 |
| 11 | 8,420 |
