= Junjou Evidence / Gyuusaretai Dake na no ni =

"Junjou Evidence / Gyuu Saretai Dake na no ni"

Single by Morning Musume

from the album 16th ~That's J-POP~
- Language: Japanese
- English title: Evidence of a Pure Heart / Even Though I Just Want You to Hold Me Tight
- Released: December 16, 2020
- Recorded: 2020
- Genre: J-pop
- Label: Zetima
- Songwriter: Tsunku
- Composer: Tsunku
- Producer: Tsunku

singles from Morning Musume singles chronology
"Kokoro & Karada / Lovepedia / Ningen Kankei No Way Way" (2020)	"Junjou Evidence / Gyuu Saretai Dake na no ni" (2020)	"Teenage Solution / Yoshi Yoshi Shite Hoshii no / Beat no Wakusei" (2021)

Music video
- 「純情エビデンス」 「ギューされたいだけなのに」: YouTube

"Junjou Evidence / Gyuu Saretai Dake na no ni" (純情エビデンス/ギューされたいだけなのに) is Morning Musume's 69th single. It was released on December 16, 2020.

== Information ==
All lyrics and compositions were created by Tsunku.

The Limited Edition SP came with an event lottery serial number card.

In the video clip of Gyuu Sareta Dake na no ni, Mizuki Fukumura, Erina Ikuta and Ayumi Ishida dressed as rabbits.

== Featured lineup ==
- 9th generation: Mizuki Fukumura, Erina Ikuta
- 10th generation: Ayumi Ishida, Masaki Sato
- 11th generation: Sakura Oda
- 12th generation: Miki Nonaka, Maria Makino, Akane Haga
- 13th generation: Kaede Kaga, Reina Yokoyama
- 14th generation: Chisaki Morito
- 15th generation: Rio Kitagawa, Homare Okamura, Mei Yamazaki

Junjou Evidence Vocalists

Main Voc: Mizuki Fukumura, Masaki Sato, Sakura Oda, Miki Nonaka

Minor Voc: Erina Ikuta, Ayumi Ishida, Maria Makino, Akane Haga, Kaede Kaga, Reina Yokoyama, Chisaki Morito, Rio Kitagawa, Homare Okamura, Mei Yamazaki

Gyuu Saretai Dake na no ni Vocalists

Main Voc: Mizuki Fukumura, Masaki Sato

Center Voc:Sakura Oda, Miki Nonaka, Akane Haga, Rio Kitagawa, Mei Yamazaki

Minor Voc: Erina Ikuta, Ayumi Ishida, Maria Makino, Kaede Kaga, Reina Yokoyama, Chisaki Morito, Homare Okamura

== Track listing ==
=== CD ===
1. Junjou Evidence
2. Gyuu Saretai Dake na no ni
3. Junjou Evidence (Instrumental)
4. Gyuu Saretai Dake na no ni (Instrumental)

=== Limited Edition A DVD ===
1. Junjou Evidence (Music Video)
2. Junjou Evidence (Making Video)

=== Limited Edition B DVD ===
1. Gyuu Saretai Dake na no ni (Music Video)
2. Gyuu Saretai Dake na no ni (Making Eizou)

=== Limited Edition SP DVD ===
1. Junjou Evidence (Dance Shot Ver.)
2. Gyuu Saretai Dake na no ni (Dance Shot Ver.)
3. Junjou Evidence (Close-up Ver.)
4. Gyuu Saretai Dake na no ni (Close-up Ver.)

== Charts Positions ==
=== Oricon ===
Daily and Weekly

Mo	Tu	Wed	Thu	Fri	Sat	Sun	Weekly	Sales
	2 84,967	2 12,018	6	10	8	1 11,727	2	112,278
18	37	41	37	36	34	40	40	14,91
38	31	36	35	34			37	578
50							68	317
							81	247
							101	200
		3 3,732					18	3,851
							170	110

Monthly

Year	Month	Month Rank	Sales
2020	December	5	113,769

=== Billboard Japan Top Single Sales ===
Week Rank	Sales
4	12,404
