= Swing Swing Paradise / Happy Birthday to Me! =

"Swing Swing Paradise / Happy birthday to Me!"

Single by Morning Musume

from the album Morning Musume Best Selection ~The 25 Shuunen~
- Language: Japanese
- English title: Swing Swing Paradise / Happy birthday to Me!
- Released: December 21, 2022
- Recorded: 2022
- Genre: J-pop
- Label: Zetima
- Songwriter(s): Tsunku
- Composer(s): Tsunku
- Producer(s): Tsunku

singles from Morning Musume singles chronology
"Chu Chu Chu Bokura no Mirai / Dai Jinsei Never Been Better!" (2022)	"Swing Swing Paradise / Happy birthday to Me!" (2022)	"Suggoi Fever! / Wake-Up Call (Mezameru Toki) / Neverending Shine" (2023)

Music video
- 『Swing Swing Paradise』 『Happy birthday to Me!』: YouTube

Swing Swing Paradise / Happy birthday to Me! is Morning Musume's 72nd single.

== Information ==
This was the last single to feature Kaede Kaga, one of the 13th generation member and also the first single to feature Rio Sakurai, representing 16th generation.

== Featured lineup ==
- 9th generation: Mizuki Fukumura, Erina Ikuta
- 10th generation: Ayumi Ishida
- 11th generation: Sakura Oda
- 12th generation: Miki Nonaka, Maria Makino, Akane Haga
- 13th generation: Kaede Kaga (last single), Reina Yokoyama
- 15th generation: Rio Kitagawa, Homare Okamura, Mei Yamazaki
- 16th generation (debut): Rio Sakurai

== Track listing ==
=== Regular A and Regular B CD ===
1. Swing Swing Paradise
2. Happy birthday to Me!
3. Swing Swing Paradise (Special Edit) (Instrumental)
4. Happy birthday to Me! (Instrumental)

=== Limited Edition A Blu-ray ===
1. Swing Swing Paradise (Music Video)
2. Swing Swing Paradise (Dance Shot Ver.)
3. Swing Swing Paradise (Making Eizou) (メイキング映像; Making Video)

=== Limited Edition B Blu-ray ===
1. Happy birthday to Me! (Music Video)
2. Happy birthday to Me! (Dance Shot Ver.)
3. Happy birthday to Me! (Making Eizou)

=== Limited Edition SP Blu-ray ===
1. Swing Swing Paradise (Kaga Kaede Solo Ver.) (加賀楓 ソロVer.)
2. Happy birthday to Me! (Kaga Kaede Solo Ver.)

== Charts ==
Chart (2022)	Peak position
Oricon Daily Chart	1
Oricon Weekly Chart	1
Oricon Monthly Chart	5
Top Singles Sales (Billboard Japan)	1
