= Chisaki Morito =

Japanese pop singer (born 2000)

Chisaki Morito (森戸知沙希)
- Born: February 19, 2000 (age 26)
- Origin: Tochigi, Japan
- Genres: Pop
- Occupations: Singer; Dancer
- Years active: 2011–present
- Labels: Pony Canyon; Zetima
- Formerly of: Morning Musume (2017–2022); Country Girls (2014–2019)

Chisaki Morito (森戸知沙希; born February 19, 2000) is a Japanese pop singer, dancer, and a 14th-generation member of Japanese girl group Morning Musume and is a former member of Country Girls up until their disbandment in 2019.

== Biography ==
=== Early life ===
Chisaki Morito was born on February 19, 2000, in Ashikaga, Tochigi, Japan.

=== 2014–present: Career in Hello! Project ===
In mid 2014, Morito participated in the Morning Musume '14 (Golden) Audition! for an opportunity to become a 12th-generation member, but failed to join the group. On November 5, it was announced that Morito would be joining the Country Musume revival group Country Girls.

On June 9, 2017, it was announced that Country Girls would be ceasing regular activities and that three of the members, including Morito, would be transferring to other Hello! Project groups. On June 26, through a special episode of Hello! Project Station, it was revealed that Morito would be joining Morning Musume as a 14th generation member while remaining a concurrent member of Country Girls.

== Discography ==
For Chisaki Morito's releases with Country Girls and Morning Musume, see Country Girls (band)#Discography and Morning Musume discography.

== Bibliography ==
=== Photobooks ===
- Chisaki Morito (森戸知沙希) (February 19 2017, Wani Books, ISBN 978-4-8470-4898-2)
- Say Cheese! (June 27, 2019, Wani Books ISBN 978-4-8470-8221-4)
- Crossroads (October 1, 2020, Wani Books ISBN 978-4-8470-8321-1)

== Filmography ==
Title	Album details	Peak chart positions	
Title	Album details	JPN	
Title	Album details	DVD	Blu-ray
Chisaki Morito: Chisaki in Paradise (森戸知沙希 Chisaki in Paradise)	Released: June 28, 2018; Label: Zetima; Formats: DVD	43	—
