= The Best Buono! =

Compilation album by Buono!
- Released: August 10, 2010 (JP)
- Genre: J-pop
- Label: Pony Canyon

Buono! chronology
We Are Buono! (2010)	The Best Buono! (2010)	Partenza (2011)

The Best Buono! is a greatest hits album by Japanese girl idol group Buono! It was released on 10 August 2010 on the label Pony Canyon.

== Release ==
The album was released in two versions: a regular edition and a limited edition. The limited edition included an additional CD and an additional DVD. The CD included in both editions, the regular and the limited, contains the A-sides of 8 of the 10 singles released by Buono! by that time (the ones excluded are the 4th single "Gachinko de Ikō!" and the 6th single "Co-no-Mi-chi". The second CD included in the limited edition contains the B-sides of all 10 singles released by Buono! by that time.

== Chart performance ==
The album debuted at number 16 in the Japanese Oricon weekly albums chart.

== Track listing ==
CD (same in both editions)
No.	Title	Notes	Length
1.	"We are Buono! — Buono! no Theme" (We are Buono！～Buono！のテーマ♡)	From the 3rd album We Are Buono!
2.	"Ren'ai Rider" (恋愛♥ライダー)	2nd single
3.	"Bravo Bravo" (Bravo☆Bravo)	9th single
4.	"Shōshitsuten (Vanishing Point)" (消失点-Vanishing Point-)	From the 2nd album Buono! 2
5.	"Honto no Jibun" (ホントのじぶん)	1st single
6.	"Take It Easy!" (Take It Easy！)	8th single
7.	"Kiss! Kiss! Kiss!" (Kiss！Kiss！Kiss！)	3rd single
8.	"Rock no Kami-sama (2010 mix version)" (ロックの神様（2010 mix version）)	Remix of a song from the 1st album Café Buono!
9.	"I Need You" (I NEED YOU)	From the 2nd album Buono! 2
10.	"Rottara Rottara" (ロッタラ ロッタラ)	5th single
11.	"My Boy" (MY BOY)	7th single
12.	"Café Buono!" (Café Buono！)	From the 1st album Café Buono!
13.	"Nakimushi Shōnen (2010 mix version)" (泣き虫少年（2010 mix version）)	Remix of a song from the 1st album Café Buono!
14.	"Blue-Sky-Blue"	From the 3rd album We Are Buono!
15.	"Our Songs" (ハピネス～幸福歓迎！～)	10th single
16.	"Last Forever (2010 mix version)" (Last Forever（2010 mix version）)	Remix of a song from the 1st album Café Buono!
17.	"Over the Rainbow" (OVER THE RAINBOW)	From the 2nd album Buono! 2
18.	"Kataomoi." (カタオモイ。)	From the 3rd album We Are Buono!
19.	"Goal" (ゴール)	From the 2nd album Buono! 2

CD (comes with the Limited Edition only)
No.	Title	Notes	Length
1.	"Kokoro no Tamago" (こころのたまご)	B-side of the 1st single "Honto no Jibun"
2.	"Janakya Mottainai!" (じゃなきゃもったいないっ！)	B-side of the 2nd single "Ren'ai Rider"
3.	"Minna Daisuki" (みんなだいすき！})	B-side of the 3rd single "Kiss! Kiss! Kiss!"
4.	"Lady Panther" (れでぃぱんさぁ)	B-side of the 4th single "Gachinko de Ikō!"
5.	"My Love" (マイラブ)	B-side of the 5th single "Rottara Rottara"
6.	"Muteki no ∞Power" (無敵の∞パワー)	B-side of the 6th single "Co-no-mi-chi"
7.	"Warp!" (ワープ！)	B-side of the 7th single "My Boy"
8.	"Kirai Suki Daikirai" (キライスキダイキライ)	B-side of the 8th single "Take It Easy!"
9.	"-Winter Story-" (-Winter Story-)	B-side of the 9th single "Bravo Bravo"
10.	"Miracle Happy Love Song" (MIRACLE HAPPY LOVE SONG)	B-side of the 10th single "Our Songs"

DVD (comes with the Limited Edition only)
No.	Title	Length
1.	"Buono! San-ji no Oyatsu Sōdatsu Baba Nuki Taiketsu" (Buono!3時のおやつ争奪 ババ抜き対決)
2.	"Jacket Satsuei / Baba Nuki Satsuei Making" (ジャケット撮影・ババ抜き撮影メイキング)

== Charts ==
Chart (2010)	Peak position
Japan (Oricon Weekly Albums Chart)	16
