= Shugo Chara! soundtracks =

Music of the Japanese shōjo manga series

Shugo Chara! (しゅごキャラ!, Shugo Kyara!), also known as My Guardian Characters, is a Japanese shōjo manga series created by the manga author duo, Peach-Pit. The story centers on elementary school girl Amu Hinamori, whose popular exterior, referred to as "cool and spicy" by her classmates, contrasts with her introverted personality. When Amu wishes for the courage to be reborn as her would-be self, she is surprised to find three colorful eggs the next morning, which hatch into three Guardian Characters: Ran, Miki, and Su.

The manga has been adapted to three animated seasons. The anime adaptation consists of twelve opening and ending singles (six for endings, four for openings and two containing both), two insert song singles, two character albums, four original soundtracks, one game single, and four drama CDs.

This article also includes a description of some of the groups formed to deliver these songs.

== Shugo Chara Egg! ==
Shugo Chara Egg! しゅごキャラエッグ!
- Origin: Japan
- Genre: J-pop
- Years active: 2008–2010
- Label: Pony Canyon
- Past members: Ayaka Wada; Yuuka Maeda; Kanon Fukuda; Irori Maeda; Mizuki Fukumura; Akari Saho; Nanami Tanabe
- Website: shugo-chara-egg.com

Shugo Chara Egg! (しゅごキャラエッグ!, Shugo Kyara Eggu!) was a Japanese idol project group formed by Up-Front Promotion in 2008 and associated with Hello! Project. The group was created to perform music for the Shugo Chara! anime series. The members' original line-up consisted of trainees from Hello! Project's pre-debut team, Hello! Pro Egg: Yuuka Maeda, Akari Saho, Kanon Fukuda and Ayaka Wada.

Aside from performing music for Shugo Chara!, Shugo Chara Egg! also starred in its musical theatre adaptation, Shugo Chara! the Musical. After Maeda, Fukuda, and Wada departed to debut in Smileage, they were replaced by Mizuki Fukumura, Irori Maeda, and Nanami Tanabe, who hosted the live-action segments in Shugo Chara! Party!

=== 2008–2009: Debut, Shugo Chara! the Musical ===
On September 3, 2008, Hello! Project announced that they would be forming a collaboration subgroup set to debut in October to perform theme songs for the Shugo Chara! anime series, with members from Hello! Project's pre-debut trainee team, Hello Pro Egg. The members were revealed during a Shugo Chara! event on September 20, 2008, attended by 1,000 people, featuring Yuuka Maeda as Amulet Heart, Akari Saho as Amulet Spade, Kanon Fukuda as Amulet Clover, and Ayaka Wada as Amulet Diamond. Shugo Chara Egg!'s debut single, "Minna no Tamago", was featured as the opening theme song for Shugo Chara! beginning October 4, 2008, with the single released on December 10, 2008. The single also included a B-side titled "Hajimari no Uta." The video single was released on January 21, 2009.

On December 26, 2008, their second single, "Shugo Shugo!", was announced as the new opening theme song for the newest season of the show, Shugo Chara! Doki, set to broadcast in January 2009 with a physical release on February 25, 2009. In April 2009, Shugo Chara Egg! performed a cover version of Guardians 4's debut song "Omakase Guardian", which was released as a B-side on the single.

A musical theatre adaptation of Shugo Chara! set to run from August 13 to August 23 was announced in January 2009, with all members of Shugo Chara Egg! appearing in the play. On May 1, 2009, news reports revealed Maeda in the lead role as Amu, Fukuda as Nadeshiko, and Saho and Wada as part of the ensemble cast. Shortly after the announcement, Hello! Project stated that Maeda, Fukuda, and Wada were withdrawing from the group after the musical to debut in Smileage. Their final song with the group was a cover version of Guardian 4's song "School Days", which appeared as a B-side on the single and released on September 2, 2009.

=== 2009–2010: Line-up changes and disbandment ===
The October 2009 issue of Nakayoshi revealed Mizuki Fukumura and Irori Maeda as the new Amulet Heart and Amulet Clover, and they would be hosting the live-action segments of Shugo Chara!'s newest season, Shugo Chara! Party!, with Saho. The group released the song "Watashi no Tamago" as a double A-side to Guardian 4's third single, "Party Time", on November 18, 2009.

Nanami Tanabe was chosen to replace Wada's role as Amulet Diamond in January 2010. On January 20, 2010, Shugo Chara Egg! released the song "Arigatō (Ōkiku Kansha)" (ありがとう～大きくカンシャ!～) as a B-side to Guardian 4's final single. On March 10, 2010, a compilation album was released featuring songs by Shugo Chara Egg!, Guardians 4, and Buono!, titled Shugo Chara! Song Best. The DVD compilation featuring their music videos, titled Shugo Chara! Clip Best, was released on March 17, 2010. After the final episode of Shugo Chara! Party aired March 27, 2010, activities for the group ended.

=== Members ===
- Akari Saho (佐保 明梨) as Amulet Spade (2008-2010)
- Mizuki Fukumura (譜久村聖) as Amulet Heart (2009-2010)
- Irori Maeda (前田 彩里) as Amulet Clover (2009-2010)
- Nanami Tanabe (田邉奈菜美) as Amulet Diamond (2009-2010)

=== Former members ===
- Yuuka Maeda (前田 憂佳) as Amulet Heart (2008)
- Kanon Fukuda (福田 花音) as Amulet Clover (2008)
- Ayaka Wada (和田 彩花) as Amulet Dia (2008)

=== Television ===
Year	Title	Role	Network	Notes
2009–2010	Shugo Chara! Party!	Hosts of live-action segments	TV Tokyo	

=== Theater ===
Year	Title	Notes
2009	Shugo Chara! the Musical	

== Guardians 4 ==
Guardians 4 ガーディアンズ4
- Origin: Japan
- Genre: J-pop
- Years active: 2009–2010
- Label: Pony Canyon
- Past members: Aika Mitsui; Yurina Kumai; Risako Sugaya; Saki Nakajima
- Website: guardians4.com

Guardians 4 (ガーディアンズ4, Gādianzu Fō) was a Japanese idol project group formed by Up-Front Promotion in 2009 and associated with Hello! Project. The group was created to perform music for the Shugo Chara! anime series. The members consist of Aika Mitsui from Morning Musume, Yurina Kumai and Risako Sugaya from Berryz Kobo, and Saki Nakajima from Cute.

=== History ===
In April 2009, Hello! Project announced a new subgroup to perform music for the second season of the Shugo Chara! anime series, titled Shugo Chara!! Doki. The group features Aika Mitsui from Morning Musume, Yurina Kumai and Risako Sugaya from Berryz Kobo, and Saki Nakajima from Cute. Their debut single, "Omakase Guardian", was first broadcast as Shugo Chara!! Doki's opening theme song on April 4, 2009, beginning with episode 77. The song was released as a single on May 27, 2009, along with a cover version by Shugo Chara Egg! and "Summer Has Come!" as B-side songs. The video single was released on June 10, 2009.

Guardians 4 released their second single, "School Days", as the second opening theme song of Shugo Chara!! Doki on September 2, 2009. The single contained a cover version of the song by Shugo Chara Egg! and "Itsuka Koko de" as B-side songs. The video single was released on September 16, 2009. After the song was featured for two months, Guardians 4 released the song "Party Time" as the first opening song to Shugo Chara!'s third season, Shugo Chara! Party!, which began broadcast in October 2009. "Party Time" was released on November 18, 2009, as a double A-side single with "Watashi no Tamago", the series' ending theme song, by Shugo Chara Egg! The video single was released on December 2, 2009.

Guardians 4 released their final single as a group, "Going On!", as the final opening theme song for Shugo Chara! Party! on January 20, 2010, which contained the B-side "Arigatō (Ōkiku Kansha)" (ありがとう～大きくカンシャ!～) by Shugo Chara Egg! The video single was released on February 3, 2010. On March 10, 2010, a compilation album was released featuring songs by Guardians 4, Buono!, and Shugo Chara Egg!, titled Shugo Chara! Song Best. The DVD compilation featuring their music videos, titled Shugo Chara! Clip Best, was released on March 17, 2010. After the final episode of Shugo Chara! Party aired March 27, 2010, activities for the group ended.

=== Members ===
- Aika Mitsui (光井愛佳) from Morning Musume
- Yurina Kumai (熊井友理奈) from Berryz Kobo
- Saki Nakajima (中島早貴) from Cute
- Risako Sugaya (菅谷梨沙子) from Berryz Kobo

== Endings ==
=== Honto no Jibun ===
"Honto no Jibun"

Single by Buono!
- Released: October 31, 2007
- Genre: Japanese Pop
- Length: 16:07
- Label: Pony Canyon

Honto no Jibun (ホントのじぶん, lit. True Self) is the first single by the Hello! Project unit Buono!, featuring Airi Suzuki, Miyabi Natsuyaki, Momoko Tsugunaga as the main performers and Maimi Yajima and Chisato Okai as background characters in the song's Promotional Video. Honto no Jibun is the first song used for the ending theme of the anime Shugo Chara!, and Kokoro no Tamago, the B-side of the CD, is the first song used for the opening theme.

Track listing
No.	Title	Length
1.	"True Self" (ホントのじぶん Honto no Jibun) (1st Ending Theme)	4:04
2.	"The Heart's Egg" (こころのたまご Kokoro no Tamago) (1st Opening Theme)	4:01
3.	"My Real Self (instrumental)" (ホントのじぶん (instrumental) Honto no Jibun (instrumental))	4:04
4.	"The Heart's Egg (instrumental)" (こころのたまご (instrumental) Kokoro no Tamago (instrumental))	3:58

=== Renai Rider ===
"Renai Rider"

Single by Buono!
- Released: February 6, 2008
- Genre: Japanese Pop
- Length: 16:09
- Label: Pony Canyon

Ren'ai Rider (恋愛♥ライダー, Ren'ai Raidā; "Love Rider") is the second single by the Hello! Project unit Buono!. The title song is used for the second ending theme of Shugo Chara!.

Track listing
No.	Title	Length
1.	"Love Rider" (恋愛♥ライダー Renai Rider) (2nd Ending Theme)	3:59
2.	"Otherwise, it's a waste!" (じゃなきゃもったいないっ! Janakya Motainai!)	4:08
3.	"Love Rider (instrumental)" (恋愛♥ライダー (instrumental) Renai Rider (instrumental))	3:58
4.	"Otherwise, it's a waste! (instrumental)" (じゃなきゃもったいないっ! (instrumental) Janakya Motainai! (instrumental))	4:04

=== Kiss! Kiss! Kiss! ===
"Kiss! Kiss! Kiss!"

Single by Buono!
- Released: May 14, 2008
- Genre: Japanese Pop
- Length: 15:53
- Label: Pony Canyon

Kiss! Kiss! Kiss! is the third single by the Hello! Project unit Buono!. Kiss! Kiss! Kiss! is the third song used for the ending theme of the anime Shugo Chara!, and Minna Daisuki, the B-side of the CD, is the second song used for the opening theme.

Track listing
No.	Title	Length
1.	"Kiss! Kiss! Kiss!" ( (3rd Ending Theme)	4:05
2.	"I Love Everyone" (みんなだいすき Minna Daisuki) (2nd Opening Theme)	3:53
3.	"Kiss! Kiss! Kiss! (instrumental)"	4:05
4.	"I Love Everyone (instrumental)" (みんなだいすき (instrumental) Minna Daisuki (instrumental))	3:50

=== Gachinko de Ikou! ===
"Gachinko de Ikou!"

Single by Buono!
- Released: August 20, 2008
- Genre: Japanese Pop
- Length: 15:27
- Label: Pony Canyon

Gachinko de Ikō! (ガチンコでいこう!, "Do Your Best and Go!") is the fourth single by the Hello! Project unit Buono!. The title song is used for the fourth ending theme of Shugo Chara!.

Track listing
No.	Title	Length
1.	"Let's Compete Earnestly!" (ガチンコでいこう！ Gachinko de Ikou!) (4th Ending Theme)	4:14
2.	"Lady Panther" (れでぃぱんさぁ)	3:31
3.	"Let's Compete Earnestly! (instrumental)" (ガチンコでいこう！ (instrumental) Gachinko de Ikou! (instrumental))	4:13
4.	"Lady Panther (instrumental)" (れでぃぱんさぁ (instrumental))	3:29

=== Rottara Rottara ===
"Rottara Rottara"

Single by Buono!
- Released: November 12, 2008
- Genre: Japanese Pop
- Length: 15:17
- Label: Pony Canyon

Rottara Rottara (ロッタラ ロッタラ, "Lotta Love Lotta Love") is the fifth single by the Hello! Project unit Buono!. The title song is used for the first ending theme of Shugo Chara!! Doki—.

Track listing
No.	Title	Length
1.	"Lotta Love Lotta Love" (ロッタラ ロッタラ Rottara Rottara); 5th Ending Theme)	3:56
2.	"My love" (マイラブ)	3:44
3.	"Lotta Love Lotta Love (instrumental)" (ロッタラ ロッタラ (instrumental) Rottara Rottara (instrumental))	3:55
4.	"My love (instrumental)" (マイラブ (instrumental))	3:42

=== Minna no Tamago ===
"Minna no Tamago"

Single by Shugo Chara Egg!
- Released: December 10, 2008
- Genre: Japanese Pop
- Length: 13:31
- Label: Pony Canyon

Minna no Tamago (みんなのたまご, Everyone's Egg) is the first single by the Hello! Project unit Shugo Chara Egg!. The title song is the first song used for the opening theme of Shugo Chara!! Doki—.

Track listing
No.	Title	Length
1.	"Everyone's Egg" (みんなのたまご Minna no Tamago) (3rd Opening Theme)	3:39
2.	"The First Song" (はじまりのうた Hajimari no Uta)	3:07
3.	"Everyone's Egg (instrumental)" (みんなのたまご (instrumental) Minna no Tamago (instrumental))	3:39
4.	"The First Song (instrumental)" (はじまりのうた (instrumental) Hajimari no Uta (instrumental))	3:06

=== Co-no-Mi-chi ===
"Co-no-Mi-chi"

Single by Buono!
- Released: January 21, 2009
- Genre: Japanese Pop
- Length: 14:17
- Label: Pony Canyon

Co-no-Mi-chi (co·no·mi·chi, Kono Michi; lit. This Road) is the sixth single by the Hello! Project unit Buono!. The title song is the second song used for the ending theme of Shugo Chara!! Doki—.

Track listing
No.	Title	Length
1.	"This Road" (co·no·mi·chiKono Michi) (6th Ending Theme)	3:34
2.	"Invincible Power" (無敵の∞Power Muteki no Power)	3:21
3.	"Co-no-Mi-chi (instrumental)" (co·no·mi·chi (instrumental) Kono Michi (instrumental))	3:33
4.	"Invincible Power (instrumental)" (無敵の∞Power (instrumental) Muteki no Power (instrumental))	3:18

=== Shugo Shugo! ===
"Shugo Shugo!"

Single by Shugo Chara Egg!
- Released: February 25, 2009
- Genre: Japanese Pop
- Length: 12:38
- Label: Pony Canyon

Shugo Shugo! (しゅごしゅご!, Guardian, Guardian!) is the second single by the Hello! Project unit Shugo Chara Egg!. The title song is the second song used for the opening theme of Shugo Chara!! Doki—.

Track listing
No.	Title	Length
1.	"Guardian, Guardian!" (しゅごしゅご! Shugo Shugo!) (4th Opening Theme)	3:20
2.	"Take me to Wonderland" (ワンダーランドにつれてって Wonderland ni Tsuretette)	3:01
3.	"Guardian, Guardian! (instrumental)" (しゅごしゅご! (instrumental) Shugo Shugo! (instrumental))	3:19
4.	"Take me to Wonderland (instrumental)" (ワンダーランドにつれてって (instrumental) Wonderland ni Tsuretette (instrumental))	2:58

=== MY BOY ===
"MY BOY"

Single by Buono!,
- Released: April 29, 2009
- Genre: Japanese Pop
- Length: 15:24
- Label: Pony Canyon

MY BOY is the seventh single by the Hello! Project unit Buono!. The title song is the third song used for the ending theme of Shugo Chara!! Doki—.

Track listing
No.	Title	Length
1.	"MY BOY" ( (7th Ending Theme)	4:13
2.	"Warp!" (ワープ! Wapu!)	3:31
3.	"MY BOY (instrumental)"	4:12
4.	"Warp! (instrumental)" (Wapu! (instrumental))	3:28

=== Omakase♪Guardian ===
"Omakase♪Guardian"

Single by Guardians 4
- Released: May 27, 2009
- Genre: Japanese Pop
- Length: 17:18
- Label: Pony Canyon

Omakase♪Guardian (しゅごしゅご!, Leaving It to me, Guardian) is the first single by the Hello! Project unit Guardians 4 featuring Aika Mitsui, Yurina Kumai, Saki Nakajima and Risako Sugaya. The title song is the third song used for the opening theme of Shugo Chara!! Doki—.

Track listing
No.	Title	Length
1.	"Leaving It to me, Guardian" (おまかせ♪ガーディアン Omakase Guardian) (5th Opening Theme)	3:23
2.	"Leaving It to me, Guardian (Shugo Chara Egg! version)" (おまかせ♪ガーディアン (しゅごキャラエッグ! Version) Omakase Guardian (Shugo Kyara Eggu! version))	3:23
3.	"Summer Has Come!"	3:36
4.	"Leaving It to me, Guardian (instrumental)" (おまかせ♪ガーディアン (instrumental) Omakase Guardian (instrumental))	3:23
5.	"Summer Has Come! (instrumental)"	3:33

=== Take It Easy! ===
"Take It Easy!"

Single by Buono!
- Released: August 26, 2009
- Genre: Japanese Pop
- Length: 15:26
- Label: Pony Canyon

Take it Easy! is the eighth single by the Hello! Project unit Buono!. The title song is the fourth song used for the ending theme of Shugo Chara!! Doki—.

Track listing
No.	Title	Length
1.	"Take It Easy!" ( (8th Ending Theme)	4:25
2.	"Hate, Like, Really Hate" (キライスキダイキライ Kirai Suki Dai Kirai)	3:20
3.	"Take It Easy! (instrumental)"	4:24
4.	"Hate, Like, Really Hate (instrumental)" (キライスキダイキライ (instrumental) Kirai Suki Dai Kirai (instrumental))	3:17

=== School Days ===
"School Days"

Single by Guardians 4
- Released: September 2, 2009
- Genre: Japanese Pop
- Length: 19:56
- Label: Pony Canyon

School Days is the second single by the Hello! Project unit Guardians 4. The title song is the fourth song used for the opening theme of Shugo Chara!! Doki—.

Track listing
No.	Title	Length
1.	"School Days" ( (6th opening Theme)	4:01
2.	"School Days (Shugo Chara Egg! version)" (School Days (Shugo Kyara Eggu! version))	4:01
3.	"Someday Somewhere." (いつかどこかで。 Itsuka Dokokade.)	3:58
4.	"School Days (instrumental)"	4:01
5.	"Someday Somewhere. (instrumental)" (いつかどこかで。 (instrumental) Itsuka Dokokade. (instrumental))	3:55

=== PARTY TIME ===
"PARTY TIME"

Single by Guardians 4
- Released: November 18, 2009
- Genre: Japanese Pop
- Length: 16:47
- Label: Pony Canyon

PARTY TIME is the third single by the Hello! Project unit Guardians 4. The title song is the first song used for the opening theme of Shugo Chara Party. The B-side is Watashi no Tamago, which is performed by the Hello! Project unit Shugo Chara Egg! and is used as the 1st opening theme of Shugo Chara!!! Dokki Doki and Shugo Chara Party.

Track listing
No.	Title	Length
1.	"PARTY TIME" ( (1st opening Theme of Shugo Chara Party!)	3:49
2.	"My Egg" (わたしのたまご Watashi no Tamago) (1st opening Theme of Shugo Chara!!! Dokki Doki)	4:37
3.	"PARTY TIME (Instrumental)"	3:47
4.	"My Egg (Instrumental)" (わたしのたまご(Instrumental))	4:34

=== Bravo☆Bravo ===
"Bravo☆Bravo"

Single by Buono!
- Released: December 16, 2009
- Genre: Japanese Pop
- Length: 15:08
- Label: Pony Canyon

Bravo☆Bravo is the ninth single by the Hello! Project unit Buono!. The title song is the first song used for the ending theme of Shugo Chara Party.

Track listing
No.	Title	Length
1.	"Bravo☆Bravo" ( (1st ending Theme of Shugo Chara Party!)	3:53
2.	"-Winter Story-"	3:43
3.	"Bravo☆Bravo (Instrumental)"	3:52
4.	"-Winter Story- (Instrumental)"	3:40

=== Going On! ===
"Going On!"

Single by Guardians 4
- Released: January 1, 2010
- Genre: Japanese Pop
- Length: 15:26
- Label: Pony Canyon

Going On! is the fourth single by the Hello! Project unit Guardians 4. The title song is the second song used for the opening theme of Shugo Chara!!! Dokki Doki and Shugo Chara Party.

Track listing
No.	Title	Length
1.	"Going On!" ( (2nd Opening Theme of Shugo Chara Party)	4:12
2.	"Arigato~ Ookiku Kansha!~" (ありがとう～大きくカンシャ！～ (2nd Opening Theme of Shugo Chara!!! Dokki Doki)	3:53
3.	"Going On! (Instrumental)"	4:11
4.	"Arigato ~Ookiku Kansha!~ (Instrumental)" (ありがとう～大きくカンシャ！～)	3:50

== Insert Songs ==
=== Meikyū Butterfly ===
"Mystery Butterfly (迷宮バタフライ, Meikyū Butterfly)"

Single by Nana Mizuki
- Released: December 19, 2007
- Genre: Japanese Pop
- Length: 18:27
- Label: Pony Canyon

Track listing
No.	Title	Length
1.	"Mystery Butterfly" (迷宮バタフライ Meikyū Butterfly) (Insert Song first listened on episode 12)	5:01
2.	"Blue Moon"	4:14
3.	"Mystery Butterfly (instrumental)" (Meikyū Butterfly (instrumental))	5:01
4.	"Blue Moon (instrumental)"	4:11

=== BLACK DIAMOND ===
"BLACK DIAMOND"

Single by Nana Mizuki
- Released: September 2, 2009
- Genre: Japanese Pop
- Length: 13:46
- Label: Pony Canyon

Track listing
No.	Title	Length
1.	"BLACK DIAMOND (Major Version)" (BLACK DIAMOND （メジャー・バージョン）) (Insert Song first listened on episode 39)	3:45
2.	"BLACK DIAMOND (Indies Version)" (BLACK DIAMOND（インディーズ・バージョン）) (Insert Song first listened on episode 39)	3:10
3.	"BLACK DIAMOND (Major Version) (instrumental)" (BLACK DIAMOND （メジャー・バージョン） (instrumental))	3:45
4.	"BLACK DIAMOND (Indies Version) (instrumental)" (BLACK DIAMOND（インディーズ・バージョン） (instrumental))	3:06

== Character Song Albums ==
=== Shugo Chara! Character Song Album Best! ===
Shugo Chara! Character Song Album Best! (しゅごキャラ！！ キャラクターソングアルバム ベスト!)

Soundtrack album by Kanae Itō, Nana Mizuki, Kana Asumi, Nanae Katō, Aki Toyosaki
- Released: March 18, 2009
- Genre: Character Album
- Length: 37:41
- Label: Pony Canyon

Track listing
No.	Title	Music	Length
1.	"Rainbow-Colored Character Change!" (にじいろキャラチェンジ! Niji-iro Kyara Chenji!) (Insert Song first listened on episode 73)	Kanae Itō, Kana Asumi, Nanae Katō, Aki Toyosaki	3:33
2.	"Maze of Butterfly" (迷宮バタフライ Meikyū Butterfly) (Insert Song first listened on episode 12)	Nana Mizuki	5:01
3.	"Happy Xmas" ( (Insert Song first listened on episode 63)	Kanae Itō, Kana Asumi, Nanae Katō, Aki Toyosaki	4:02
4.	"Maybe a Good Thing" (いいことありそう Ii Koto Ari Sou) (Insert Song first listened on episode 64)	Kana Asumi, Nanae Katō, Aki Toyosaki	3:28
5.	"Your Birthday" (君のBirthday Kimi no Birthday) (Insert Song first listened on episode 69)	Kanae Itō	3:23
6.	"Blue Moon"	Nana Mizuki	4:11
7.	"BLACK DIAMOND (Major Version)" (BLACK DIAMOND （メジャー・バージョン）) (Insert Song first listened on episode 39)	Nana Mizuki	3:45
8.	"Strongest Love Power" (最強LOVE POWER Saikyū LOVE POWER) (Insert Song first listened on episode 62)	Kanae Itō, Kana Asumi, Nanae Katō, Aki Toyosaki	3:47
9.	"Heartful Song" ( (Insert Song first listened on episode 47)	Nana Mizuki	4:45
10.	"The Dream Bud" (ゆめのつぼみ Yume no Tsubomi) (Insert Song first listened on episode 42)	Nana Mizuki	1:26

=== Shugo Chara! Character Song Album Best! 2 ===
Shugo Chara! Character Song Album Best! 2 (しゅごキャラ！！ キャラクターソングアルバム ベスト! 2)

Soundtrack album by Kanae Itō, Nana Mizuki, Rie Kugimiya, Reiko Takagi, Yuuichi Nakamura, Saeko Chiba, Tomoko Nakamura, Sayuri Yahagi
- Released: August 5, 2009
- Genre: Character Album
- Length: 37:23
- Label: Pony Canyon

Track listing
No.	Title	Music	Length
1.	"Colorful Heartbeat" (カラフルハートビート Karafu Hatobito)	Kanae Itō, Reiko Takagi, Saeko Chiba, Tomoko Nakamura, Sayuri Yahagi	3:54
2.	"Secret Princess" (シークレットプリンセス Shikuretsuto Purinsesu) (Insert Song first listened on episode 86)	Rie Kugimiya	4:00
3.	"Little Stars ~The Little Prince~" (ちいさな星～The Little Prince～ Chiisana Hoshi ~The Little Prince~)	Reiko Takagi	4:34
4.	"Someday, Romance" (いつかはロマンス Itsuka wa Romansu (Insert Song first listened on episode 123)	Sayuri Yahagi	5:14
5.	"Grow up!" (大きくなぁれ! Ookiku Naare! (Insert Song first listened on episode 107)	Tomoko Nakamura	4:06
6.	"Flower Letter" (花手紙 Hana Tegami)	Saeko Chiba	4:25
7.	"Marionette on a Moonlight Night" (月夜のマリオネット Tsukiyo no Marionetto)	Yuuichi Nakamura	3:56
8.	"The Sun Fits You" (太陽が似合うよ Taiyou ga Niau yo) (Insert Song first listened on episode 93)	Nana Mizuki	3:16
9.	"Secret Princess (Amu Ver.)" (シークレットプリンセス(あむVer.) Shikuretsuto Purinsesu (Amu Ver.))	Kanae Itō	3:58

== Soundtracks ==
=== Shugo Chara! Original Soundtrack Vol.1 ===
Shugo Chara! Original Soundtrack Vol.1

Soundtrack album by Di'LL
- Released: March 19, 2008
- Genre: Anime soundtrack
- Length: 48:34
- Label: Pony Canyon

Track listing
No.	Title	Length
1.	"Open Heart" (オープンハート Oopun Haato)	1:41
2.	"Avant Title" (アバンタイトル Abantaitoru)	0:14
3.	"Seiyo Elementary's Morning" (聖夜学園の朝 Seiyo Gakuen no Asa)	1:35
4.	"Subtitle" (サブタイトル Sabutaitoru)	0:08
5.	"Cool & Spicy Girl!!"	2:12
6.	"My Real Self" (本当の自分 Hontou no Jibun)	1:34
7.	"Today's Nice Weather!" (今日もイイ天気! Kyou mo Ii Tenki!)	1:48
8.	"High Tension Rush!?" (ハチャメチャHigh↑テンション!? Hacha Mecha High Tension!?)	1:36
9.	"Creepy Shadow" (忍び寄る影 Shinobiyoru Kage)	1:48
10.	"The Born of X Character" (×キャラ誕生 X Kyara Tanjou)	1:46
11.	"Absolute Annihilation!" (絶体絶命! Zettai Zetsumei!)	1:35
12.	"Character Transformation! Amulet Heart!" (キャラなり!アミュレットハート! Kyara Nari! Amyuretto Haato!)	0:43
13.	"Character Transformation! Amulet Spade!" (キャラなり!アミュレットスペード! Kyara Nari! Amyuretto Supeedo!)	0:42
14.	"Character Transformation! Amulet Clover!" (キャラなり!アミュレットクローバー! Kyara Nari! Amyuretto Kuroobaa!)	0:42
15.	"Battle!" (バトル! Batoru!)	1:40
16.	"The Eggs of Hope" (希望のたまごたち Kibou no Tamago Tachi)	1:47
17.	"Gentle light"	1:35
18.	"Eyecatch A" (アイキャッチA Aikyacchi A)	0:08
19.	"Eyecatch B" (アイキャッチB Aikyacchi B)	0:08
20.	"Preview" (次回予告 Jikai Yokoku)	0:34
21.	"Watching the Stars" (星を見上げて Hoshi wo Miagete)	2:14
22.	"It's a Guardian Character World!" (イッツ・ア・しゅごキャラ・ワールド! Ittsu a Shugo Kyara Waarudo!)	1:35
23.	"My Prince" (私の王子様 Watashi no Ouji-sama)	1:35
24.	"Yamato Nadeshiko" (やまとなでしこ Yamato Nadeshiko)	1:35
25.	"Black Cat Soaring into the Dark Night" (闇夜を駆ける Yamiyo wo Kakeru Kuro Neko)	1:40
26.	"The Violinist of the Moonlit night" (月夜のバイオリニスト Tsukiyo no Violinist)	2:23
27.	"Hide the Passion" (情熱を秘めて Jounetsu wo Himete)	1:45
28.	"The Plans" (たくらむ者たち Takuramu Mono Tachi)	1:47
29.	"EASTER"	1:34
30.	"After school" (放課後 Houkago)	1:39
31.	"The Throbbing Heart" (トキメクココロ Tokimeku Kokoro)	1:42
32.	"The Distance Between the Two" (二人の距離 Futari no Kyori)	1:48
33.	"Always Together" (いつでもいっしょ Itsudemo Issho)	1:35
34.	"Towards the Honest Feelings" (素直な気持ちで Sunao na Kimochi de)	1:46

=== Shugo Chara! Original Soundtrack Vol.2 ===
Shugo Chara! Original Soundtrack Vol.2

Soundtrack album by Di'LL
- Released: August 20, 2008
- Genre: Anime Soundtrack
- Length: 52:08
- Label: Pony Canyon

Track listing
No.	Title	Length
1.	"Welcome to the Royal Garden" (ロイヤルガーデンにようこそ Royal Garden ni Youkoso)	1:51
2.	"The Little King" (小さな王様 Chiisana Ou-sama)	1:38
3.	"King's Chair" (キングスチェア Kingusu Chea)	1:38
4.	"I'll be the King!" (我は王なり! Ware wa Ou Nari!)	1:53
5.	"Nadeshiko's Dance" (なでしこの舞 Nadeshiko no Mai)	1:33
6.	"Azure Night" (紺碧の夜 Konpeki no Yoru)	1:46
7.	"Oh Mademoiselle Dere!" (Oh デレ マドモアゼル! Oh Dere Madomoazeru!)	1:41
8.	"Spit It Out!" (ビシッと言うわよ! Bishitto Iu wa yo!)	1:44
9.	"The Town Full of Sunlight" (陽射し降る町 Hizashi Furu Machi)	1:43
10.	"Happy Family" (ハッピー・ファミリー Happii Famirii)	1:44
11.	"Cat and Mouse's Race!" (追いつ!追われつ! Oitsu! Owaretsu!)	1:44
12.	"The Laughable Conclusion" (トホホな結末 Tohoho na Ketsumatsu)	1:49
13.	"Let's Call Saaya-sama to Play" (沙綾様とお呼びあそばせ Saaya-sama to Oyobi Asobase)	1:40
14.	"The Gentle Starry Sky" (優しい星空 Yasashii Hoshizora)	1:38
15.	"A Little Step" (小さな一歩 Chiisana Ippo)	1:45
16.	"The Closed Door" (閉じてしまった扉 Tojite Shimatta Tobira)	2:09
17.	"My Heart, The Inner Mistake" (心、奥深く Kokoro, Okufukaku)	1:47
18.	"Lost" (迷い Mayoi)	1:46
19.	"Classroom" (教室 Kyoushitsu)	1:45
20.	"Omen" (予兆 Yochou)	1:45
21.	"Invisible Fear" (見えない恐怖 Mie nai Kyoufu)	1:41
22.	"Revealed Invitation" (現れた正体 Arawareta Shoutai)	1:37
23.	"Easy on my Feelings!" (キモチ軽やかに! Kimochi Karoyaka ni!)	1:42
24.	"Before The Storm" (嵐の前 Arashi no Mae)	1:34
25.	"High Speed Action"	1:47
26.	"The Guardian's Visit!" (ガーディアン参上! Guardian Sanjou!)	1:39
27.	"Christmas Town" (クリスマスの街 Christmas no Machi)	1:55
28.	"It's Party Time!" (イッツ・パーティータイム! Ittsu Paatii Taimu!)	1:36
29.	"Guardian Character Swing" (しゅごキャラ Swing Shugo kyara Swing)	1:46
30.	"The New Year's Holiday at Hinamori's House" (日奈森家のお正月 Hinamori Ie no Oshougatsu)	1:52

=== Shugo Chara! Original Soundtrack Vol.3 ===
Shugo Chara! Original Soundtrack Vol.3

Soundtrack album by Di'LL
- Released: November 19, 2008
- Genre: Anime Soundtrack
- Length: 29:01
- Label: Pony Canyon

Track listing
No.	Title	Length
1.	"Embryo" (エンブリオ Enburio)	1:56
2.	"Smile, Rima" (笑って、りま Waratte, Rima)	1:39
3.	"Golden Prince" (黄金の王子 Ougon no Ouji)	1:57
4.	"The Visit!" (降臨! Kourin!)	1:57
5.	"The Drop of The Night" (夜の雫 Yoru no Shizuku)	1:40
6.	"Kairi, His Swaying Heart" (海里、揺れる心 Kairi, Yureru Kokoro)	1:46
7.	"Platinum Royal" (プラチナロワイヤル Purachina Rowaiyaru)	1:44
8.	"Melancholic Eyes" (物憂げな瞳 Monou ge na Hitomi)	1:47
9.	"Loneliness" (孤独 Kodoku)	2:00
10.	"Grief" (痛み Itami)	1:46
11.	"Mystery" (神秘 Shinpi)	2:17
12.	"A Fairy of the flowers" (花の妖精 Hana no Yousei)	2:40
13.	"L'apres-midi Calme"	1:40
14.	"My Wonderful Town"	1:35
15.	"Good Night" (おやすみなさい Oyasuminasai)	1:54
16.	"Shiver" (戦慄 Senritsu)	0:14
17.	"Prediction" (思惑 Omowaku)	0:11
18.	"Dawn" (夜明け Yoake)	0:18

=== Shugo Chara! Original Soundtrack Vol.4 ===
Shugo Chara! Original Soundtrack Vol.4

Soundtrack album by Di'LL
- Released: February 18, 2009
- Genre: Anime Soundtrack
- Length: 26:38
- Label: Pony Canyon

Track listing
No.	Title	Music	Length
1.	"The Lonely Queen" (ひとりぼっちのクイーン Hitori Bocchi no Queen)		1:52
2.	"My World" (私の世界 Watashi no Sekai)		2:03
3.	"Believe in Your Radiance" (輝きを信じて Kagayaki wo Shinjite)		1:46
4.	"Character Transformation! Amulet Diamond!" (キャラなり!アミュレットダイヤ! Kyara Nari! Amyuretto Daiya!)		1:40
5.	"Angel Cradle"		2:25
6.	"Our Earth" (僕達の地球 Bokutachi no Chikyuu) (Insert Song first listened on episode 45)	Kanae Itō, Chorus	3:17
7.	"Our Earth (Karaoke)" (僕達の地球 (カラオケ) Bokutachi no Chikyuu (Karaoke))		3:17
8.	"Saaya-sama's Piano" (沙綾様のおピアノ Saaya-sama no Piano)		1:37
9.	"The Song of Courage" (勇気の歌 Yuuki no Uta) (Insert Song first listened on episode 49)	Kanae Itō	1:19
10.	"Gozen" (御前)		2:00
11.	"The Serenade of a Black Cat" (黒猫のセレナーデ Kuro Neko no Serenade)		2:00
12.	"Shugo Chara! Suite (Music for Pilot Film)" (しゅごキャラ!Suite (パイロットフィルム用音楽) Shugo Kyara! Suite (Pairotto Firumu You Ongaku))		3:22

=== Shugo Chara!! Doki Original Soundtrack Vol.1 ===
Shugo Chara!! Doki Original Soundtrack Vol.1

Soundtrack album by Di'LL
- Released: December 16, 2009
- Genre: Anime Soundtrack
- Length: ???
- Label: Pony Canyon

Track listing
No.	Title	Length
1.	"???" (どきっとスタート! ???)	???
2.	"Daily life of amu"	???
3.	"Subtitle" (サブタイトル Sabutaitoru)	???
4.	"???" (メリーゴーランド ???)	???
5.	"???" (ガーディアンのティータイム ???)	???
6.	"???" (色彩の無い世界 ???)	???
7.	"???" (おおはしゃぎ曜日 ???)	???
8.	"???" (ともだち ???)	???
9.	"Break down!?"	???
10.	"???" (ダメ×ダメ ???)	???
11.	"???" (あの子の想い ???)	???
12.	"???" (大きく!小さく!くるくる!ぴょん! ???)	???
13.	"???" (あっち、こっち、どっち!? ???)	???
14.	"???" (変身美少女キャッツイヤー ???)	???
15.	"Waltz for freedom"	???
16.	"???" (お宅訪問ズバババーん! ???)	???
17.	"???" (ナゾキャラチェンジ ???)	???
18.	"Eyecatch A" (アイキャッチA Aikyacchi A)	???
19.	"Eyecatch B" (アイキャッチB Aikyacchi B)	???
20.	"???" (十字架を背負って ???)	???
21.	"???" (包囲網 ???)	???
22.	"???" (キャラなり!ガーディアンズ! ???)	???
23.	"???" (囚われてしまった心 ???)	???
24.	"Heavy fight"	???
25.	"???" (オープンハート! (Ver.2) ???)	???
26.	"???" (不思議な光 ???)	???
27.	"???" (そこにある、あたたかさ。 ???)	???
28.	"???" (楽しい予感 ???)	???
29.	"???" (星の道しるべ ???)	???
30.	"???" (次回予告 ???)	???

=== Shugo Chara!! Doki Original Soundtrack Vol.2 ===
Shugo Chara!! Doki Original Soundtrack Vol.2

Soundtrack album by Di'LL
- Released: August 18, 2010
- Genre: Anime Soundtrack
- Length: ???
- Label: Pony Canyon

Track listing
No.	Title	Length
1.	"???" (決戦の時 ???)	???
2.	"Step, Step, Step!!"	???
3.	"???" (のんびりしたっていいじゃない。 ???)	???
4.	"???" (うまくいかない事だらけ!? ???)	???
5.	"???" (抜き足、差し足、忍び足 ???)	???
6.	"???" (ハンプティ・ロック ???)	???
7.	"???" (おひさまわらった ???)	???
8.	"ILL the Rock!!"	???
9.	"YORU DA BEAT"	???
10.	"???" (ストリートバンド ???)	???
11.	"Girls Festival"	???
12.	"???" (お囃子A ???)	???
13.	"???" (お囃子B ???)	???
14.	"???" (お囃子C ???)	???
15.	"???" (夏の夕凪 ???)	???
16.	"???" (おうちに帰ろ ???)	???
17.	"???" (ピエロとダンス ???)	???
18.	"???" (すれちがう心 ???)	???
19.	"???" (夕焼け色につつまれて ???)	???
20.	"???" (さざなみ ???)	???
21.	"???" (闇のピチカート ???)	???
22.	"???" (デスレーベル ???)	???
23.	"???" (ヤマトマイヒメ ???)	???
24.	"???" (クイーンズワルツ ???)	???
25.	"???" (アミュレットフォーチュン ???)	???
26.	"???" (不思議な二人のおかしな旅 ???)	???
27.	"???" (オープンハート・フルボリューム ???)	???
28.	"???" (君に、ありがとう。 ???)	???

== Others ==
=== Niji-iro Chara Change! ===
"Niji-iro Chara Change! (にじいろキャラチェンジ!, Rainbow-Colored Character Change!)"

Single by Kanae Itō, Kana Asumi, Nanae Katō, Aki Toyosaki
- Released: November 5, 2008
- Genre: Game Soundtrack
- Length: 29:23
- Label: Pony Canyon

Track listing
No.	Title	Music	Length
1.	"Rainbow-Colored Character Change!" (にじいろキャラチェンジ! Niji-iro Kyara Change!) (Insert Song first listened on episode 73)	Kanae Itō, Kana Asumi, Nanae Katō, Aki Toyosaki	3:33
2.	"Strongest Love Power" (最強LOVE POWER Saikyū LOVE POWER) (Insert Song first listened on episode 62)	Kanae Itō, Kana Asumi, Nanae Katō, Aki Toyosaki	3:47
3.	"Rainbow-Colored Character Change! (Amu's Karaoke)" (にじいろキャラチェンジ! (あむちゃんと歌おうカラオケ) Niji-iro Kyara Change!)	Kanae Itō	3:34
4.	"Rainbow-Colored Character Change! (Ran, Miki, Su's Karaoke)" (にじいろキャラチェンジ! (ラン・ミキ・スゥと歌おうカラオケ) Niji-iro Kyara Change!)	Kana Asumi, Nanae Katō, Aki Toyosaki	3:33
5.	"Rainbow-Colored Character Change! (Karaoke)" (にじいろキャラチェンジ! (カラオケ) Niji-iro Kyara Change! (Karaoke))		3:34
6.	"Strongest Love Power (Amu's Karaoke)" (最強LOVE POWER (あむちゃんと歌おうカラオケ) Saikyū LOVE POWER (Amu's Karaoke))	Kanae Itō	3:47
7.	"Strongest Love Power (Ran, Miki, Su's Karaoke)" (最強LOVE POWER (ラン・ミキ・スゥと歌おうカラオケ) Saikyū LOVE POWER (Ran, Miki, Su's Karaoke))	Kana Asumi, Nanae Katō, Aki Toyosaki	3:48
8.	"Strongest Love Power (Karaoke)" (最強LOVE POWER (カラオケ) Saikyū LOVE POWER (Karaoke))		3:47

== Chart performance ==
=== Singles ===
For Shugo Chara Egg!:

List of singles, with selected chart positions, sales figures and certifications
Title	Year	Peak chart positions		Sales	Album
Title	Year	JPN	JPN Hot	Sales	Album
"Minna no Tamago" (みんなのたまご)	2008	9	95	—	Shugo Chara! Song Best
"Shugo Shugo!" (しゅごしゅご!)	2009	14	—	—	Shugo Chara! Song Best
"Watashi no Tamago" (わたしのたまご)	2009	14 (Note: "Watashi no Tamago" was physically released as a double A-side single with "Party Time" by Guardians 4. The sales count and Oricon ranking reflects both releases combined.)	—	—	Shugo Chara! Song Best
"—" denotes releases that did not chart or were not released in that region.

For Guardians 4:

List of singles, with selected chart positions, sales figures and certifications
Title	Year	Peak chart positions		Sales	Album
Title	Year	JPN	JPN Hot	Sales	Album
"Omakase Guardian" (おまかせ♪ガーディアン)	2009	18	—	—	Shugo Chara! Song Best
"School Days"	2009	8	98	—	Shugo Chara! Song Best
"Party Time"	2009	14 (Note: "Party Time" was physically released as a double A-side single with "Watashi no Tamago" by Shugo Chara Egg! The sales count and Oricon ranking reflects both releases combined.)	—	—	Shugo Chara! Song Best
"Going On!"	2010	8	—	—	Shugo Chara! Song Best
"—" denotes releases that did not chart or were not released in that region.

=== Video singles ===
For Shugo Chara Egg!:

List of singles, with selected chart positions, sales figures and certifications
Title	Year	Peak chart positions	Sales	Album
Title	Year	JPN	Sales	Album
"Minna no Tamago" (みんなのたまご)	2008	66	—	Shugo Chara! Clip Best
"Shugo Shugo!" (しゅごしゅご!)	2009	68	—	Shugo Chara! Clip Best
"—" denotes releases that did not chart or were not released in that region.

For Guardians 4:

List of video singles, with selected chart positions, sales figures and certifications
Title	Year	Peak chart positions	Sales	Album
Title	Year	JPN	Sales	Album
"Omakase Guardian" (おまかせ♪ガーディアン)	2009	23	—	Shugo Chara! Clip Best
"School Days"	2009	41	—	Shugo Chara! Clip Best
"Party Time"	2009	65	—	Shugo Chara! Clip Best
"Going On!"	2010	44	—	Shugo Chara! Clip Best
"—" denotes releases that did not chart or were not released in that region.
