= List of Shugo Chara!! Doki— episodes =

- The cover of the first DVD compilation released by Pony Canyon.
- No. of episodes: 51

Release
- Original network: TV Tokyo, TV Aichi, TV Hokkaido, TV Osaka, TV Setouchi, TVQ Kyushu Broadcasting
- Original release: October 4, 2008 – September 26, 2009

Series chronology
- ← Previous; Shugo Chara! Next → Shugo Chara Party!

Shugo Chara!! Doki— (しゅごキャラ!!どきっ, Shugo Kyara!! Doki) is the 2008 sequel to the Japanese anime television series Shugo Chara! Like its predecessor, Shugo Chara!! Doki— is loosely based on Peach-Pit's award-winning manga series Shugo Chara! and is produced by Satelight under the direction of Kenji Yasuda. The second season features new characters such as Lulu de Morcerf, a new employee for the Easter Company who uses her mysterious ruby necklace to corrupt people's dreams by turning their Heart's Eggs into ? Eggs causing them to wreak havoc.

The first episode, "Sparkle With All Your Might!" (めいっぱいのキラキラ!, Meippai no Kirakira!), was first broadcast on TV Tokyo in Japan on October 4, 2008, where the series continues to air. The episodes are rebroadcast by TV Aichi, TV Hokkaido, TV Osaka, TV Setouchi, and TVQ Kyushu Broadcasting within a few days of the initial broadcast.

Several pieces of theme music are used over the course of the series—two opening themes by Shugo Chara Egg! and two closing themes by J-pop group Buono!. The opening theme for the first twelve episodes is "Everyone's Egg" (みんなのたまご, Minna no Tamago), and starting with episode sixty-five the opening theme is "Guardian Guardian!" (しゅごしゅご!, Shugo Shugo!). The opening theme "Leave It to the Guardian" (おまかせ♪ガーディアン, Omakase Gādian), which is from episode 77 to episode 89, is by the newest group, Guardians 4. The opening theme from episodes 90 to 102 is "School Days", also performed by Guardians 4. The ending theme from episodes 52 to 68 is "Lotta Love Lotta Love" (ロッタラロッタラ, Rottara Rottara). From episode 69 to 76, the ending theme is "This Road" (co·no·mi·chi). The ending theme from episode 77 to 89 is "My Boy", which is also performed by Buono!. The ending theme from episode 90 to 101, is "Take It Easy!", again performed by Buono!. Episode 102 ends with "Honto no Jibun", originally shown as the first ending theme to the first season.

== Episode list ==
| Season | Series | Title | Directed by | Written by | Original release date |
|---|---|---|---|---|---|
| 1 | 52 | "Sparkle With All Your Might!"; Transliteration: "Meippai no Kirakira!" (Japanese: めいっぱいのキラキラ!) | Kazuo Sakai | Kenji Yasuda | October 4, 2008 |
Kiseki has called another meeting with the Guardian Characters, but no one is paying attention to him. Diamond suddenly hatches, much to the delight of Ran, Miki, and Su. Ran tells everyone of her crazy history with Amu, as does Miki and Su. They begin to fight over who helped Amu the best, and everyone laughs. Then, they talk about all the Guardians, and how Diamond hatched. They all begin to feel Amu's radiance in them. Later that day, Amu appears at the Royal Garden and Ran is about to show the hatched Diamond to her, when they see that Diamond has gone back into her egg. Amu questions Ran, and then Su points over to Kiseki. All of the Guardians make fun of Kiseki, causing him to "become a spirit." Diamond momentarily hatches and giggles.
| 2 | 53 | "Hectic Day to Speak Frankly!?"; Transliteration: "Butchake Ōisogashi!?" (Japanese: ぶっちゃけ大忙し!?) | Yūki Yase | Hiroshi Ōnogi | October 11, 2008 |
The Guardians are gathered around eating doughnuts. Then the Easter workers are reminiscing about the past when Nikaidou and Yukari were still working for Easter and when Utau was producing the Black Diamond CDs. Amu goes to talk to Tsukasa, and he tells her that changes are going to happen, and she might not notice it, but the people who pay close attention will. When Amu is heading home, it rains, so she stops under a tree. After saying Ikuto's name aloud, he pops down suddenly from the tree. To Amu's shock, she accidentally slips, leaving Ikuto preventing her from falling and the two talk. Ikuto mentions that Amu has changed somehow. Tadase shows up with an umbrella, gets angry, and fights Ikuto while they both Character Change. Amu decides to do something, and she Character Transforms to Amulet Heart. The Humpty Lock becomes more powerful and her transformation changes, causing the Dumpty Key to respond to the power. The rain clears, showing a rainbow.
| 3 | 54 | "Eh? A New Friend!"; Transliteration: "Ē? Atarashii Otomodachi!" (Japanese: えぇ? 新しいお友達!) | Mamoru Enomoto | Hiroshi Ōnogi | October 18, 2008 |
Amu is walking along, when the Guardians meet up with her. Yaya praises Amu for her powered-up Humpty Lock. With her classmates, Amu goes to visit Manami's flower shop. Manami tells Amu that she dreams of being a florist some day. While Amu is leaving, Lulu de Morcerf shows up to see Manami. The next day, Amu brings Manami cookies for thanks when Miki and Su sense a Guardian Egg (Ran doesn't sense it, but plays along). Amu meets Lulu, and she learns that Lulu can see Guardian Characters. Ikuto sees Lulu walking up the Easter building steps and, after she passes him, stares at her with disdain. Later, Lulu meets Manami again and turns her Heart's Egg into a ? Egg using a special ruby necklace. The Guardian Characters sense this, and the Guardians go to Manami, who Character Transforms into Flower Dream. Amu transforms into Amulet Heart. She almost gets squashed by Manami, but gets powered up pom-poms to deflect the attack. After reasoning with Manami, her ? Egg turns into an X Egg, allowing a stronger Open Heart to purify her. At the end, Amu is with the Guardians, wondering if Lulu was connected to Easter and the events.
| 4 | 55 | "Put the Heart of the Song on Wings!"; Transliteration: "Tsubasa ni Uta no Kokoro o Nosete!" (Japanese: 翼に歌の心をのせて!) | Fumiharu Kamanaka | Hiroshi Ōnogi | October 25, 2008 |
Lulu shows Kazuomi a book containing information about the Mystery Eggs. She then offers to shake Ikuto's hand, but he refuses. Amu is standing outside of a store, when a girl walks out. The girl's cell phone rings, and Amu notices her ringtone is "Heartful Song." The two talk, and Amu ends up agreeing to show the girl, Hitomi, Utau in-person. Amu is frustrated, but goes to see Yukari. After being rejected, Amu sees Utau walking out of the building. The two talk, but Miki senses the presence of a ? Egg. They head off to see Hitomi hypnotized, singing and putting everybody in a trance. After Utau criticizes her, Hitomi Character Transforms to Singer Dream; Amu and Miki then transform to Amulet Spade. Amu's Colorful Canvas is overpowered by Hitomi's power, so Amu tries attacking with a new move: Prism Music, and succeeds. Utau then Character Transforms to Seraphic Charm and Angel Cradles Hitomi's ? Egg into an X Egg. This frees everyone else from the trance. Amu finally uses Open Heart to purify the X Egg and free her. The Embryo shows up, so Lulu tells Ikuto to grab it, but Ikuto had left earlier on. When Ikuto arrives home, his violin is missing; it was stolen by Easter.
| 5 | 56 | "To the Sky! The Feeling to Take Off!"; Transliteration: "Ōzora e! Tobitatsu Kimochi!" (Japanese: 大空へ! 飛び立つキモチ!) | Kazunobu Shimizu | Toshizō Nemoto | November 1, 2008 |
Nadeshiko returns, but much to Kukai's surprise, he is actually a boy named Nagihiko. When Amu sees him, she is told that Nagihiko would be the new Jack's Chair. Amu still believes Nagihiko is Nadeshiko's twin even though they are the same. Rima is jealous and suspicious of Nagihiko, especially with his and Amu's friendship. Later, Amu is seeing hanging around Mamoru Mizuno who wishes to visit the town's planetarium. Lulu notices this, so she plans to get to Mamoru after he leaves the planetarium, but Amu sees her. Lulu brushes her off, angering Amu immensely. Mamoru later goes to the Guardians with his Heart's Egg turned into a ? Egg, and he Character Transforms to Space Dream. Amu Character Transforms to Amulet Heart. Thanks to the Humpty Lock; Tadase's, Rima's, Yaya's, and Kukai's transformations power-up. Using his powers, he lifts a lot of things off the ground. He tries to lift a rocket-style play set, but the Guardians hold it down. Amu acquires roller skates, Heart Speeder, to chase after him. Eventually, Mamoru realizes he is in the wrong, changing his ? Egg into an X Egg, which Amu purifies.
| 6 | 57 | "Real Pretty Close Call!"; Transliteration: "Geki-kawa Kiki-ippatsu!" (Japanese: 激カワ危機一髪!) | Yasushi Muroya | Miya Asakawa | November 8, 2008 |
When Amu makes a high school boy, Yugaku Iwagaki, angry, she gets more than she bargained for as he chases the female Guardians all around the school. While being chased, Amu finds a deer figurine. After the chase, the female Guardians return to the Royal Garden, finding Kukai and Tadase in female school uniforms due to Nagihiko (Kukai asked Nagihiko what it was like to wear a skirt and angered him). The figurine Amu found earlier belonged to Yugaku, who is not only a strong karate student, but also has a love for anything cute. Meanwhile, Easter is studying Ikuto's violin and they want to put X Egg energy into it. Lulu comes by to the Iwagaki dojo and takes advantage of his love for cute things, turning his Heart's Egg to a ? Egg. When Amu comes by, Yugaku Character Transforms to Punching Dream and makes a mess of the dojo. Amu and Rima transform to Amulet Spade and Clown Drop, but after being outnumbered, Su switches in, becoming Amulet Clover. Clearing up misunderstandings, Amu performs Open Heart to purify him.
| 7 | 58 | "Panic in Class Plum!"; Transliteration: "Panikku in Sumomo-gumi!" (Japanese: パニック·イン·すもも組!) | Hiromitsu Kanazawa | Nobuaki Yamaguchi | November 15, 2008 |
The Guardian Characters go to Ami's class, the Kindergarten Plum class. Everything appears to be going well for them; all of the Guardian Characters are playing with the children. Panic comes when Nana spots a frustrated student, Maa. Lulu is told of this and manipulates the child, turning his Heart's Egg to a ? Egg. Ami tags along with Amu and the Guardians to go home. Amu and the Guardians notice Maa, and Character Transforms into Amulet Heart. After fighting with clay statues, which mold over and over again, Miki switches with Ran. Amu tries to convince Maa to stop, but he ignores her. Finally, Amu says that she will get mad, and Maa hears. She tries to purify him, but after a while, Maa finishes his clay model of Kiseki, and is so happy, that his Egg purifies itself, which causes the statue to collapse. Kiseki mourns for the statue after the collapse. The group is glad Maa is okay, and they head home. Maa's mom comes, and Maa insists she buy him origami paper because he is "done with clay." At home, Amu and her Guardian Characters find out that Ami had gotten a "Guardian Character House" for Ran, Miki, and Su to make them happy.
| 8 | 59 | "Utau Hoshina! New Beginning!"; Transliteration: "Hoshina Utau! Atarashii Shuppatsu!" (Japanese: ほしな歌唄! 新しい出発!) | Takahiro Majima | Mamiko Ikeda | November 22, 2008 |
Amu and her Guardian Characters are watching Utau sing on television when El shows up. She tells them that Utau needs more people to go to her concert so she can get popular again. Amu shows up, but Utau won't listen to her. Amu decides to try to bring Ikuto there. Utau begs Amu, and Amu finds Ikuto. She begs Ikuto to play his violin there, but he refuses. Amu doesn't know that he lost it until he tells her. Ikuto then tricks her, saying that he'll listen if she asks more sweetly. Amu stomps away, embarrassed and angry, then tells Utau he couldn't come. Yukari then entrusts Amu to hand out fliers. Meanwhile, Ikuto tries to get his violin back, but he ends up getting caught and hurt. Amu has no luck handing out fliers, until Tadase, Rima, and Yaya appear. El appears out of nowhere and transforms into Amulet Angel, using Angel Wink to attract some boys to give fliers to. Tadase, Rima, and Yaya also Character Transform to help pass out fliers. Eventually, they get many people to come. Utau sings "Heartful Song," and is still sad that Ikuto couldn't come until she sees Ikuto. She smiles and continues to sing. Amu spots Ikuto and tries to catch up with him, but he leaves before she could thank him. Ikuto smiles because he heard Utau sing.
| 9 | 60 | "When You Confess, it's Your Lucky Day?"; Transliteration: "Rakkī Dē wa Kokuhaku Biyori?" (Japanese: ラッキー·デーは告白日和?) | Mamoru Enomoto | Kinuko Kuwahata | November 29, 2008 |
Amu and her family are sitting around the television eating breakfast. A prediction is made that Amu will find love, to which each family member reacts differently. In class, a girl is using Zodiac signs, Tarot cards, etc., to predict what may happen to classmates. Amu wants to know, but in order to keep her exterior, she asks Rima to go. However, Rima says she'll only go if Amu goes first. Later on, Lulu asks the girl, Koyomi, to predict her fortune. Disappointed, Lulu makes her unhappy. The next day, Koyomi is shown with distress, but she predicts a classmate's fortune. The classmate goes to confess her love for Tadase, while Amu and Koyomi watch. The classmate is rejected, and this sends Koyomi into rage, running off. While running, Koyomi runs into Lulu, who changes her Heart's Egg into a ? Egg, making Koyomi Character Transform to Fortune Dream. While running after her, Amu's Guardian Characters sense this, and Amu Character Transforms to Amulet Clover. Seeing Koyomi causing misfortune towards the townsfolk, Amu uses with Honey Bubbles to clear their delusion and stop Fortune Dream's attack.
| 10 | 61 | "Notice Kiran's Feelings!"; Transliteration: "Todoke! Kiran no Omoi!" (Japanese: 届け! キランの思い!) | Makoto Hoshino | Toshizō Nemoto | December 6, 2008 |
While a girl named Hinako moves away, her Guardian Egg drops out from her package. Amu notices this and picks it up on her way to the Royal Garden. She, Kukai, and the Guardians discuss and decide to find the owner of the egg. While the rest of the Guardian Characters are asleep, Diamond awakes and appears as a projection and gives who is in the egg reassurance. The egg eventually hatches to reveal Kiran, Hinako's Guardian Character. The Guardian Characters go places, having fun, helping out others, and try to find Kiran's owner. Yoru, Il, and El later come and decide to help. They eventually find Kiran's owner and part ways after Hinako is troubled, hurting Kiran. Amu gets a text message from Utau, telling her where to find her Guardian Characters. She eventually meets up with the rest of the Guardians.
| 11 | 62 | "Rima vs. Nagihiko! Are the Two Rivals?"; Transliteration: "Rima vs. Nagihiko! Futari wa Raibaru?" (Japanese: りまvsなぎひこ! ふたりはライバル?) | Kazuo Sakai | Nobuaki Yamaguchi | December 13, 2008 |
A scene is shown where the X Eggs are being matured with Ikuto's violin. The Guardians and the Guardian Characters clean up the library in the Royal Garden. Rima gets jealous of Nagihiko because of all the time being spent with Amu, so Amu and Nagihiko take Rima to the mall. After many attempts by Amu to get Rima to laugh, Rima declares her rivalry to Nagihiko. In their clumsiness, the Easter employees drop some of their X Eggs while on the pursuit for more. Amu and Rima Character Transform to respond. Nagihiko tells Amu and Rima to go certain ways, but Rima goes the opposite way, and Amu falls into a hole (one of the laughing attempts made earlier). Rima then gets attacked by the X Eggs, but Nagihiko guards her. Rima realizes that they need Nagihiko's help, so they all cooperate, with Amu purifying the X Eggs at the end. Nagihiko ends up falling in a hole himself, and in a show of humor, pulls Rima down the hole with him. Even at the end of the episode, Amu is still trying to make Rima laugh.
| 12 | 63 | "Lulu's Flawless Christmas!"; Transliteration: "Ruru no Kanpeki Kurisumasu!" (Japanese: ルルの完璧クリスマス!) | Kiyoshi Matsuda | Miya Asakawa | December 20, 2008 |
Amu and her family are invited over to a friend's house for Christmas, but little did Amu know that it was going to be at Lulu's place. While inside, Amu noticed that Lulu was a good host. When seeing Lulu trying to assemble a Christmas Tree all by herself, Amu went outside to help. At first, Lulu refused help, but eventually, they both were in-sync. When they got back inside, Lulu saw her parents dressed in Christmas costumes. Being embarrassed, Lulu ran outside to get away. While wandering through the city, she saw a man dressed as Santa Claus being treated rudely by the crowd. Seeing the opportunity, she turned his Heart's Egg into a ? Egg. This backfired, however, as the man chased after her, eventually Character Transforming into Santa Dream. The Guardian Characters sensed this, and Amu transformed into Amulet Heart after catching up with the man. At first, Amu wasn't sure how to defeat him, but after filling his gift sack with pom-poms, his bag burst. Amu reasoned with him, changing his ? Egg into an X Egg.
| 13 | 64 | "The New Year! First Laughter in Character Transformation!?"; Transliteration: "Shinshun! Kyara Nari Hatsu Warai!?" (Japanese: 新春! キャラなり初笑い!?) | Yūki Yase | Toshizō Nemoto | December 27, 2008 |
This is the Guardians' first visit to this year's New Year Festival. Two festival performers, Kiko and Rin, are practicing for the festival's show. The Guardians decide to help them, with Rima coaching. Lulu joins in and impresses everyone with her skills. An Easter worker calls Lulu away from the festival and informs her that Ikuto has stolen his violin away from Easter. Lulu later finds Ikuto, with his violin over his shoulder, struggling to walk from the previous escape. Ikuto convinces her not to tell that she saw him and she lets him leave. The Guardians are waiting for the show to start, and are wondering where Kiko and Rin are. Lulu finds Kiko and Rin, who have lost their self-confidence. Lulu turns their Heart's Eggs into ? Eggs, causing them to Character Transform to Happy Dream 1 and 2. She stands behind a tree while all of the Guardians Character Transform, except for Nagihiko, who stands nearby. After the Guardians blocked the performers' attacks, Amu changes the ? Eggs into X Eggs, and then purifies them. After that, everyone, except for Lulu who had left, finishes watching the show. Amu returns home and gets ready to go to bed. When she goes to bed, she is surprised to see Ikuto asleep beside her.
| 14 | 65 | "Snow Days are Full of Secrets?"; Transliteration: "Yuki no Hi wa Naisho ga Ippai?" (Japanese: 雪の日はナイショがいっぱい?) | Hazuki Mizumoto | Kinuko Kuwahata | January 10, 2009 |
Yoru tells Amu the reason why Ikuto is sleeping in her room. During breakfast, Amu's parents asked her to take her little sister out. Reluctantly, Amu complies. She goes to play with Ami, but Tadase and the others meet up with her. Irritated, she thinks of ways to get home to make sure Ikuto is okay. All her methods end up failing, and she ends up playing for a long time. Meanwhile, her mother goes to clean her room, and Yoru has to hide Ikuto somewhere. When Amu goes back to her room, she doesn't see Ikuto or Yoru. Relieved, she goes to the closet, only to have Ikuto fall out of it, onto her. After Ikuto wakes up, Amu shows gladness that Ikuto was showing signs of being stronger than earlier, when he was weak. She gives him some food that she bought on her way back. Ikuto gets Amu to admit that she watched him sleep, which bothered Amu immensely. Amu's mother then calls her down to dinner, with Ikuto left deciding whether to stay at Amu's place or camp elsewhere.
| 15 | 66 | "Uproar! A Cat-Eared Girl!?"; Transliteration: "Osawagase! Neko Mimi Shōjo!?" (Japanese: お騒がせ! 猫耳少女!?) | Kazunobu Shimizu | Mamiko Ikeda | January 17, 2009 |
As the Guardians are leaving their meeting, Amu hears about a cat-eared person showing up, only to find out that it's a girl named Chiyoko Nakayama, or, as the girl stated, "Choco" as a nickname. As an anime fan, she states that she feels useless normally dressed. Lulu notices this and keeps a close eye on her. Meanwhile at Amu's house, Amu is unable to sleep due to having Ikuto in the same bed as her. The next day, Choco sees a man painting graffiti and tries to stop him while dressed up in her cat outfit, but it turns out the guy was actually drawing a mural. After Choco ran off, Lulu met up with her and turned her Heart's Egg into a ? Egg. Choco Character Transforms to Pretty Transforming Heroine Magical Choco-tan Dream, and the Guardians respond by transforming as well. Choco's giant dinosaur attack is warded off by Holy Crown, Yaya's duckies, and Juggling Party, but they are stopped by Choco's Cat's Ear Supersonic Wave, Pretty Transforming Heroine Magical Choco-tan Special. Choco's Magical Choco-tan Dream Special is matched in power by Amu's Spiral Heart Special. Meanwhile, Ikuto has left Amu's room.
| 16 | 67 | "A UFO Girl Appears!"; Transliteration: "UFO Shōjo Arawaru!" (Japanese: UFO少女あらわる!) | Takahiro Majima | Hiroshi Ōnogi | January 24, 2009 |
Being troubled by Ikuto leaving suddenly, Amu dreams about Ikuto still being there. At the meeting with the Guardians, they notice Amu spacing out. Amu explains that it was just a "stray cat." Later, Lulu and Nana are looking for somebody who is down so they could turn the person's Heart's Egg into a ? Egg. Nana, using the idea of UFOs on the television she saw earlier with Lulu, decided to make a crop circle. As a result, they meet a girl named Nayuta Kusanagi. At first, Nayuta is highly enthusiastic about UFOs, but after she learns the crop circle was a prank, her self-esteem lowers to the point where Nana could detect it. Lulu saw Nayuta as a friend, but after Nana reminded Lulu of the mission of finding the Embryo for her mom, Lulu changes her Heart's Egg to a ? Egg. Amu finds Nayuta in a circle with other people chanting for UFOs to come down. After Nayuta Character Transforms to UFO Dream, Amu transforms to Amulet Heart. With Heart Speeder, she chases after Nayuta. After that doesn't work, Amu Character Transforms to Amulet Spade and uses Prism Music to purify the X egg.
| 17 | 68 | "Fare Thee Well, Yamabuki Saaya..."; Transliteration: "Sayōnara, Yamabuki Saaya..." (Japanese: さようなら, 山吹沙綾...) | Yūsaku Saotome | Nobuaki Yamaguchi | January 31, 2009 |
Amu becomes the #1 popular girl at school. Saaya Yamabuki has to transfer to another school, because her father's company is going overseas. She then throws a farewell party. At the party, she surprises Amu and challenges her to three duels to settle who's the most popular before she leaves. Amu wins two and partially the last one. The next day, Amu invites Saaya to the Royal Garden. There, she flirts around Tadase, who tells her he likes girls with spunk. Yaya teases him, causing Amu and Tadase to blush and Saaya to become upset. She runs off, and Lulu finds her. Although Saaya proves to be stubborn, Lulu changed her Heart's Egg to a ? Egg. Saaya transforms into Hinamori Dream. Amu, dumbfounded, transforms into Amulet Heart, with Saaya transforming to Gorgeous Heart. She tries a Spiral Heart Special, but Saaya uses Gorgeous Heart Special, matching in strength. Amu changes to Amulet Spade, and Saaya to Gorgeous Spade. Amu tries using Prism Music, but fails to Saaya's Break Music. Amu changes to Amulet Clover, and Saaya to Gorgeous Clover. Saaya ruined some trees earlier, so Amu fixes them with Remake Honey, but Saaya uses Break Honey. Amu then tells Saaya she is perfect the way she is. Saaya's ? Egg transforms to an X Egg, which Amu purifies, and Saaya is back to normal. Saaya stays in Japan, while her parents left.
| 18 | 69 | "First Love? Love Attack!"; Transliteration: "Hatsukoi? Rabu Atakku!" (Japanese: 初恋? ラブアタック!) | Mamoru Enomoto | Toshizō Nemoto | February 7, 2009 |
Today is Rima's birthday. As she is walking to school, a boy with a crush on her catches her eye. The rest of the Guardians are throwing a surprise party for her. While in the school, Rima takes out a love letter she received two weeks earlier from the same boy, Fuyuki Kirishima. Amu agrees to help Fuyuki get a chance to talk to Rima. With some unexpected help from El (who went to do errands, but didn't come back to Utau), they formulate a plan. Nana senses the confesser's nervousness and Lulu turns his Heart's Egg into a ? Egg. The plan goes awry, and he Character Transforms to First Love Dream. Amu and Su transform to Amulet Clover; the rest following suit. Due to flustering, his attacks are uncontrollable. A stray heart aims for Rima, but Nagihiko jumps and takes it, almost confessing he's Nadeshiko to the rest of them. Tadase gets hit and he nearly confesses, but is stopped by Kiseki. Amu uses Remake Honey to clear everyone's delusion, tells Fuyuki to keep trying, and purifies him. He confesses but, Rima rejects the confession kindly, saying she can't see herself going out with someone yet, and the party goes by without a hitch.
| 19 | 70 | "I Hate These Stupid Chocolates!?"; Transliteration: "Choko nanka Daikkirai!?" (Japanese: チョコなんか大っきらい!?) | Yūki Yase | Kinuko Kuwahata | February 14, 2009 |
Tomorrow is Valentine's Day. Amu wants to make chocolate for Tadase. Involuntarily going to a cooking class (ran by Lulu's father), she meets Yukina Kogure, a patissier who's entering a contest. Amu compliments Yukina's goods, and Yukina says she is giving them to Daisuke, a boy who hates chocolate. Last year didn't go well, so she tries again, only to back out, making her a target for Lulu. Many others are celebrating Valentine's Day today. Yukina is not present at the contest. By the time Amu gets to Yukina, she has Character Transformed to Chocolate Dream and is wreaking havoc, blowing Amu's chocolate away. Character Transforming to Amulet Clover, Amu takes a wave of chocolate with whisk and bowl and makes some of her own, curing everyone of hypnosis. Yukina wins the contest and finally wows Daisuke (who actually liked chocolate, but was too embarrassed to show it) with her chocolates, and Amu's chocolates have made its way to Yoru and Ikuto.
| 20 | 71 | "The Arduous Path of Truth! Kairi Returns!"; Transliteration: "Kewashiki Makoto no Michi! Kairi Futatabi!" (Japanese: 険しき誠の道! 海里再び!) | Shin Tosaka | Miya Asakawa | February 21, 2009 |
The students are taking a trip to a summit for two days. Amu at first doesn't want to go, but thinks about the things she'll be able to do with Tadase and changes her mind. It turns out one of the Chairmen is Kairi. Tadase, Amu, and Kairi sit in silence. The Guardian Characters break the tension. After that, they decide to go to the lake the next day. While Kairi gets water, he overhears some girls saying that Tadase and Amu are a cute couple. Later, Amu overhears Kairi saying he doesn't want to see Amu anymore, because of what he lacks. Amu gets angered by this, and asks why he can't stay the way he is. At the lake, a little boy, Saito, ends up getting lost. Kairi, who recovered and took Amu's advice, starts searching for him, while Amu and Tadase already were. Amu finds Saito later. A storm comes, and a tree falls over, resulting in a log targeting Amu, Tadase, and Saito. Kairi then Character Changes in time. Tadase and Kairi transform into Platinum Royale and Samurai Soul to stop the logs. The summit ends with everyone safe. Kairi apologizes to Amu, and Amu starts blushing again. Kairi tells Tadase that even though he's far away, he shouldn't let his guard down.
| 21 | 72 | "All Shook Up! The Grandmother Appears!!"; Transliteration: "Gekishin! Obaasama Tōjō!!" (Japanese: 激震! おばあさま登場!!) | Masaru Yasukawa | Nobuaki Yamaguchi | February 28, 2009 |
Lulu's grandma appears, and Lulu's mom and dad must show her that they are high class enough to stay in Japan. Meanwhile, when Lulu's grandma meets Amu, she tells her to dress nicely by tucking in her shirt. Amu leads Lulu's grandma to Lulu's house and Amu joins them for lunch. Lulu's grandma asks Lulu what her dream is. Lulu replies she does not know yet, but her grandma says she recalls Lulu saying that she always wanted to become an artist when she grows up. Lulu laughs and says that was when she was a kid, and now it is embarrassing. Meanwhile, Ikuto is in the garden in the amusement park, sitting down on the grass. Easter has made a device that causes Ikuto's violin to hurt him using X Egg energy, and they set it on high for a test. Ikuto feels some pain but it goes away later because the device had lost connection. Ikuto stays there with Yoru, and Yoru tries to help him. Lulu goes to find a lost soul and finds a girl who can't choose which type of food she likes. Her Heart's Egg is turned into a ? Egg and she Character Transforms to Temple Festival Dream and makes everyone eat "taiyakisoba," a term Amu's Guardian Characters coin. Amu first says that the girl's dream is pretty weird, but apologizes later. Amu transforms with Ran and says to just follow your own dream. Amu's words went to Lulu's heart and she is speechless. Lulu's grandma is leaving to Paris, and Lulu and Amu say goodbye to her. Lulu's grandma asks Lulu what her dream is again. Lulu says her dream is to make her mom high class. Lulu's grandma chuckles and asks Lulu what her dream is. Lulu is speechless again and her grandma leaves. It ends with Lulu lying on her bed, thinking about what her dream is. Lulu's grandma thinks that Amu can change Lulu to being a little more outgoing and fun, so Lulu's grandma accepts Amu as Lulu's friend.
| 22 | 73 | "Classified! Make-up Recipe?"; Transliteration: "Maruhi! Nakanaori no Reshipi?" (Japanese: (秘)! 仲直りのレシピ?) | Yasushi Muroya | Toshizō Nemoto | March 7, 2009 |
The Guardians are gathered at a cafe, and Miki is observing some cake, which Ran steals and eats. Both get in a fight, and Su tells them to stop fighting. Ran calls her cheeky, they all get angry at each other, and Su flies off. Su then finds Mimori, a girl that loves cooking but isn't good at it so instead, she says she wants to be a critic. Surprisingly, Mimori can't see Su but can hear Su's voice. Mimori thinks it is the voice of the cooking fairy and asks for her help. Back at the Royal Garden, the rest of the Guardian Characters are trying to help Ran and Miki become friends again. While they are having a meeting, Diamond appears and tells Ran and Miki to make up quickly. Then, she returns to her egg and flies away, with Ran and Miki following her. After a while, Ran and Miki lose track of where Diamond is and begin fighting again. However, they see Nagihiko talking with Diamond, expressing his enviness towards Amu and wondering when his two eggs will hatch. Later, Lulu finds Mimori, and turns her Heart's Egg to a ? Egg, making her Character Transform into Delicious Dream. Amu tries to Character Transform to stop her, but can't because her Guardian Character's hearts are not aligned. Mimori captures Su, then Ran and Miki work together to save her. All three make up, Amu Character Transforms into Amulet Heart, then Amulet Spade, and then Amulet Clover to stop Mimori. Yoru finds Amu and begs her to help him, because Ikuto is in trouble.
| 23 | 74 | "An Exciting White Day!"; Transliteration: "Dokki Doki no Howaito Dē!" (Japanese: ドッキドキのホワイトデー!) | Kazuo Sakai | Hiroshi Ōnogi | March 14, 2009 |
Amu wakes up and says good morning to Ikuto, whom she had rescued the day before and brought back to her house. Ikuto annoys Amu all through the day, causing Amu to become immensely irritated. While Amu is studying, Tadase comes over to her house and Amu's mother suggests they talk in Amu's room. To prevent getting caught, Amu quickly goes upstairs to throw Ikuto, Yoru and the violin into her closet, telling them to be quiet. Tadase gives Amu the White Day present and confesses to her, asking if it's OK to be in love with her. Amu is ecstatic and says yes. Later that night when Amu is talking to Ikuto, he brings up the subject of Tadase loving her and Amu asks him if he likes someone. He answers yes and says it is Amu. She doesn't believe Ikuto, so he states he must be the boy that cried wolf, and they both go to sleep.
| 24 | 75 | "The Jig is Up!? Utau Pays a Visit!"; Transliteration: "Bareta!? Utau ga Uchi ni Yattekita!" (Japanese: バレた!? 歌唄が家にやってきた!) | Takahiro Majima | Kinuko Kuwahata | March 21, 2009 |
Ikuto and Amu talk about Utau. Soon, Utau shows up at Amu's doorstep and asks her if they could talk about Ikuto. Amu, accepting the invitation, follows Utau into a ramen shop, where they meet Haruki Maruyama, someone who criticizes ramen-eating styles. Meanwhile, Nana and Lulu are watching them eat ramen and Nana accuses Lulu of being jealous. Afterwards, Amu and Utau leave the shop. Utau shares a story about how she became tied to Easter due to sins committed by their father. Tadase and Kukai show up. As Kukai talks to Utau about a ramen challenge, they go for it and leave Tadase and Amu behind. Tadase starts to call Amu "Amu-chan" instead of "Hinamori-san," and tells her about how he will tell her he loves her from now on. Lulu finds the discouraged Haruki and he becomes Gourmet Dream. Utau and Kukai find Amu and Tadase who transform in Amulet Clover and Platinum Royale. They both get tied by firm ramen and Utau frees them with the trident she gets when she turns into Lunatic Charm. Amu tells Haruki that it's okay as long as you enjoy the way you eat it. X Eggs gather around the sound of pizzicato (Plucking the stirings of an instrument like violin) and the silhouette of an ominous new Character Transformation.
| 25 | 76 | "New Enemy!? Battle On Moonlight!"; Transliteration: "Aratanaru Teki!? Tsukiyo no Batoru!" (Japanese: 新たなる敵!? 月夜のバトル!) | Kazuhide Kondō | Miya Asakawa | March 28, 2009 |
Amu dreams about what Tadase told her in the previous episode. She awakens to Ikuto, who is still at her house. At school, Amu burns herself and Tadase helps her. Yaya and Rima begin to get suspicious, of the way they are acting and that Tadase switched from "Hinamori-san" to "Amu-chan." Afterwards, Nagihiko begins telling the crew that he saw kids with empty hearts while hearing the pizzicato. Tadase and Amu begin to suspect things. When walking home, they start hearing the pizzicato. Tadase begins to suspect things even more, and Amu gets worried. As soon as Amu gets home, she asks if Ikuto went out while she was gone while she was at school. He replies no and goes to bed. The scene then shows Kazuomi Hoshina, the director of Easter, explaining his plot. Energy from Ikuto's violin drips and turns into an Egg. There is a blinding purple flash, and Yoru gets worried. Tadase goes to the park as Platinum Royale, to find Ikuto in a strange form—Death Rebel. Tadase knows that his suspicions were correct and starts fighting him. In the morning, Amu notices a fresh cut on Ikuto's right arm. When walking to school, she notices Tadase hurt as well. At the meeting, Tadase tells the group who's behind it—Ikuto. Amu is alarmed as Tadase tells what had happened last night. Amu starts thinking about telling them about Ikuto, but changes her mind and asks why Tadase has a grudge against him. Everyone becomes silent until Yaya changes the subject. Outside, Amu seeks Nagihiko's advice, making him look and talk like Nadeshiko. While talking, Amu starts to wonder if she really should or should not tell him. On the way home, Tadase buys flowers for his sick grandmother. Amu starts bringing up the subject about Ikuto staying at her house, but instead she says he's not a bad person. Tadase gets a serious look on his face and tells Amu that Ikuto is nothing but a black cat who brings misfortune.
| 26 | 77 | "Shocking! First Date, Busted!?"; Transliteration: "Shōgeki! Kowasareta Hatsu Dēto!?" (Japanese: 衝撃! 壊された初デート!?) | Mamoru Enomoto | Toshizō Nemoto | April 4, 2009 |
Tadase is buying flowers for his grandmother, and he tells Amu that Ikuto is a black cat that brings misfortune, but Amu can not see how Ikuto is that way. Meanwhile, at Seiyo Academy, some students come and interview the Guardians for their class newspaper. When Amu looks at Tadase, the students see them looking at each other and think the two are 'going out,' and write this in the newspaper. At the end of the school day, Tadase asks Amu out on a date in the evening, and Amu goes home to find out what she could wear. Amu remembers Ikuto and realizes he needs a shower. He showers while Amu guards the door. When Ikuto finishes, he and Amu opened the door and find Amu's mother waiting outside. Amu, Amu's mother, and Ikuto discuss the issue of him staying in Amu's room and Amu not trusting her parents. They decide to have Ikuto spend the night at a hotel. Amu forgets about her date with Tadase and goes to help Ikuto pack. Tadase comes over right when Amu and Ikuto are packing together, to see why Amu had not come for the date. Ikuto tells Tadase that he's been living in Amu's room and heard his confession to Amu. Tadase gets furious and upset at Amu, and hurries out of her house. Amu scolds Ikuto, saying that he should get out of her house. Amu begins to run after Tadase, but doesn't find him in the end. Later we see, Ikuto is seen walking away from Amu's house, only to be captured by Easter.
| 27 | 78 | "Amu-chan's Loong Day!?"; Transliteration: "Amu-chan no Nagāi Ichinichi!?" (Japanese: あむちゃんのなが〜い一日!?) | Kazunobu Shimizu | Nobuaki Yamaguchi | April 11, 2009 |
Amu goes back to school and worries about having to face Tadase. However, Kiseki comes to bring news that Tadase has a cold, making Amu feel relieved. The rest of the Guardians notice that Amu is unhappy and try to cheer her up, but it doesn't seem to work. Yaya comes up with the idea of paying Tadase a visit. However, Nagihiko proposes that Amu be the "representative" and see Tadase by herself, because too many people seeing Tadase wouldn't be good for him. On her way, she sees Lulu, who also notices that Amu isn't happy. She Character Changes with Nana and asks her to tell her what was wrong, but before Amu says anything, the Character Change is over. Lulu runs away, mortified. Amu heads to the mall, and ends up meeting two twin sisters, Nemi and Nami. After that, Lulu sees the twins upset and turns their Heart's Eggs into ? Eggs, making them transform into Twin Dream. The other Guardians come to help Amu and at the end, they defeat Twin Dream. Meanwhile, Tadase is at a park and talking with Kiseki. He promises that he is going to go to school the next day and talk over the situation with Amu.
| 28 | 79 | "Ikuto and Amu Sorrowful Battle!"; Transliteration: "Ikuto to Amu Kanashimi no Batoru!" (Japanese: イクトとあむ 悲しみのバトル!) | Miho Hirao | Mamiko Ikeda | April 18, 2009 |
Kukai is out shopping for groceries for his older brothers. On the way back, he encounters Tadase. Tadase tells him he wishes he had an older brother, so Kukai invites Tadase to his house. There, his brothers complain about getting the wrong groceries and Kukai's oldest brother, Kaido, challenges him to a soccer match. After his "special training," Kukai tells Tadase that the Guardians and Guardian Characters will always be with him. Meanwhile, Amu runs away from home and goes to the park, after Yoru comes and begs her to help save Ikuto. Her Guardian Characters catch up with her and tell Amu not to worry. She Character Transforms into Amulet Heart and begins looking for Ikuto. She finds him at the old amusement park and watches him Character Transform into Death Rebel. Amu doesn't want to fight Ikuto, but when he is about to hurt her with his scythe, Tadase appears and deflects the attack.
| 29 | 80 | "Believe in Each Other! Platinum Heart!"; Transliteration: "Shinjiru Kimochi! Purachina Hāto!" (Japanese: 信じるキモチ! プラチナハート!) | Hazuki Mizumoto | Kinuko Kuwahata | April 25, 2009 |
After a short recap of the last episode, Ikuto tries to regain control over his mind. Amu runs toward him, but Ikuto says to stay away. Kazuomi brings out the device that has been controlling Ikuto, a tuning fork. He uses it and Ikuto falls back into the controlled state. Ikuto tries to attack Amu, but Tadase stops him. After a talk about feelings with Kazuomi, Amu and Tadase combine their powers and use Platinum Heart. All of the X Eggs are purified and the Embryo appears. When Amu is about to grab the Embryo, the Humpty Lock reacts to its light, causing Amu's transformation to dissolve. Tadase catches her, but Yoru is distressed as Kazuomi took Ikuto and left. Everyone wakes up and Amu Character Changes with Ran to tell people that it is the park's promotional free ride day. It works, and Amu and Tadase sit on a bench, talking about what has happened over the past few weeks. After she finishes explaining, Amu apologizes. Tadase says that he won't forgive Ikuto, but wants to know the truth and proposes the idea of them working together. They both go to school the next day, walking side by side. Rima, Nagihiko, and Yaya run up to say how worried they were about them. While drinking tea, Tsukasa Amakawa, the First King, says the Humpty Lock and Dumpty Key will soon unite.
| 30 | 81 | "Infiltration! Easter Company!?"; Transliteration: "Sennyū! Īsutāsha!?" (Japanese: 潜入! イースター社!?) | Yūki Yase | Miya Asakawa | May 2, 2009 |
The episode starts with Yoru looking exhausted as he rests in Kiseki's chair. He has just came back from looking for Ikuto the night before. Kiseki, being the character he is, finds Yoru sleeping in his chair and becomes angry, scolding Yoru that it's his fault Ikuto is being controlled by Easter because he's such a coward. Yaya proposes a plan to get inside of Easter and find Ikuto and during the Guardians' attempts, Yoru, upset by Kiseki's words, tries again to find Ikuto. Kiseki notices him leave and tags along. They both manage to find the music tuner which controls Ikuto. Yoru and Kiseki manage to grab the tuner and run, but Kiseki is later caught. Yoru, caught between leaving with the tuner to helping Kiseki, has a difficult time deciding, but makes the decision of helping Kiseki. Unfortunately, Yoru loses the tuner in the process, but he and Kiseki manage to escape. Meanwhile, the other Guardian Characters go to the amusement park to look for clues, but find nothing and decide to go on the rides. They go back to meet Amu and the others, who are all wondering where Yoru and Kiseki are. In the end, they find the two of them resting on each other, exhausted from their day.
| 31 | 82 | "Fierce Battle! I'll Become the Ace Player!"; Transliteration: "Nettō! Watashi ga Ēsu ni Naru!" (Japanese: 熱闘! 私がエースになる!) | Shin Tosaka | Mizuuchi Seri | May 9, 2009 |
Lulu and Nana are walking down the street when they see a baseball-playing girl practicing her pitches. The next day, Amu is relaxing when a baseball comes straight for her. The same girl from yesterday, Natsuko Nishino, catches it before it can hit her. Amu decides to try baseball, seeing as how girls can play it too. The problem is that she does not know how to play and Natsuko has issues with the current pitcher, Fujita, who is mocking her talent. After meeting with Rima and Yaya, Yaya recommends that Amu go see Kukai for special training. When the day of the pitcher test arrives, Natsuko is not chosen as the pitcher. She leaves, and Lulu turns her Heart's Egg into a ? Egg. When Amu finds her, she Character Transforms to Pitching Dream. Kukai and Amu become Sky Jack and Amulet Heart. Natsuko throws a baseball to Amu, thinking she can't hit it. After she finally hits the baseball and home run, Amu tells Natsuko to keep trying. The game goes without a problem the next day.
| 32 | 83 | "Chance Encounter at the World Music Fair?"; Transliteration: "Surechigai no Ongaku Hakurankai?" (Japanese: すれちがいの音楽博覧会?) | Murotani Yasushi | Toshizō Nemoto | May 16, 2009 |
Amu and the other Guardians go to the World Music Fair. They are also worried that Easter will be there since it is a place where many people will gather. Amu invites Yoru to go along as well. Lulu also goes disguised as a fairy dancer. She hands out flowers to children while dancing. Lulu sees the Easter vans and dances into the one where Ikuto is being held. She ties up the workers and Nana turns off the tuning fork. Lulu frees Ikuto, because she does not want him to get the Embryo, as she wants it for her mother. Ikuto leaves the Easter van, and walks around the fair. One of the children that Lulu gave a flower to has her Heart's Egg turned into a ? Egg and becomes Dancing Dream. Amu is walking with Tadase, and is just about to walk into Ikuto when the Guardian Characters come over and tell Amu there is a ? Egg. Amu and Tadase run off to see the cause. Amu and Tadase become Amulet Spade and Platinum Royale. Yaya and Rima are caught under the girl's spell and can't stop dancing. She turns nearby people into ballerinas who surround Amu and Tadase. Suddenly, Nagihiko appears and says that he will teach the girl what dancing really is. They do a ballroom dance, and her ? Egg turns into an X Egg, and everything goes back to normal. Ikuto is feeling weak again, and walking through a park, he sees Amu and Yoru, but then collapses. On Amu's way home, Yoru repeatedly says he feels Ikuto's presence nearby. They turn around and search for Ikuto. Before they can find him, Easter does and takes him away.
| 33 | 84 | "Mr. Nikaidou is a Teacher After All!?"; Transliteration: "Nikaidō-sensei wa Sensei Dattā!?" (Japanese: 二階堂先生は先生だったぁ!?) | Shōgo Kōmoto | Hiroshi Ōnogi | May 23, 2009 |
Lulu is fired of Easter for her acts from the last episode. At school, Nikaidou gives an essay assignment to the Star Class about their dreams for the future. Amu meets up with the Guardians after school to speak with what they want to be when they grow up. After the meeting, Amu, Manami, and Wakana meet with Nikaidou. It turns out Wakana wants to be a teacher when she grows up. She admires Nikaidou for his kindness. That night, Amu gets a text message from Tadase, who is still searching for Ikuto. At Lulu's place, she is still wondering what her dream is after her mother asks what it is. While Wakana is walking home from school, she begins to doubt her dream, and this makes her a target for Lulu. Rima gets Amu and when they find Wakana, they try to stop her. She transforms to Teacher Dream, Rima and Amu become Clown Drop and Amulet Spade once they find her. Wakana performs a spell that makes them fall in line, but Amu protests, breaking free and attacks. Amu tells her to never lose her kindness. Nikaidou catches up with the girls and they look ahead to their future.
| 34 | 85 | "Wassup! Here Comes the Gal Everyone's Talking About!!"; Transliteration: "Chīsu! Uwasa no Gyaru Tōjō!!" (Japanese: ち〜す! 噂のギャル登場!!) | Kazuo Sakai | Nobuaki Yamaguchi | May 30, 2009 |
Yaya has applied to have teen model Yua Sakurai come to the school. Amu's Guardian Characters are watching a photo shoot when Su hears a voice behind her. While they are talking in the Royal Garden, a music themed Guardian Egg appears, and out comes Cecil, Yua's Guardian Character. Yua doesn't know what a Guardian Character is, and is a little annoyed at Cecil following her. The two do not get along well, and they are separate because Yua abandoned her dreams of being a singer in favor of modeling. At a photo shoot, the girl Guardians learn that she is going to sing in the next Girls' festival. When she is recording, she has flashbacks to an incident and won't sing. At the day of the festival, Amu meets with Utau, who is a guest singer for the festival. When it's Yua's turn to sing, she again has flashbacks to an incident, and falls to her knees onstage. The episode ends in a cliffhanger with Amu concerned about Yua.
| 35 | 86 | "Resound, My Voice! To Who I Used to Be!!"; Transliteration: "Hibike Utagoe! Ano Hi no Atashi ni!!" (Japanese: 響け歌声! あの日のあたしに!!) | Tatsufumi Itō | Nobuaki Yamaguchi | June 6, 2009 |
Picking up after last episode, Utau manages to keep the festival going and saves the show. Backstage, Nagihiko finds Yua and the two talk for a while. Nagihiko mentions that Cecil was born from Yua's dream, and if she doesn't believe in her, she'll disappear. Next day, an article about Yua's time with the Guardians comes out. Amu still hasn't heard from Yua though, and begins to worry. Cecil suddenly appears and explains that Yua freezes up when singing in front of people and that she hides when Yua sings. She's trying to force herself to hate singing. Yua's current uncertainty makes her a target for Lulu, and Cecil undergoes an extreme change when Lulu uses her necklace on Yua. Amu and Yaya follow Cecil to Yua, and when Amu and Yaya find them, they perform a Character Transformation, becoming Vocal Singer Dream. Amu and Yaya transform to Amulet Spade and Dear Baby, and fight Yua. Utau later appears as Seraphic Charm and comes to help when Amu is bound by music notes. After some pushing from Amu, Yua reveals that no one believed she can sing. Amu tells her that she will listen to her. The episode ends with Yua singing "Secret Princess."
| 36 | 87 | "Save Nana! Guardian Character Nurses, Move Out?"; Transliteration: "Nana o Sukue! Shugo Chara Nāsu Shutsudō?" (Japanese: ナナを救え! しゅごキャラナース出動?) | Yūsaku Saotome | Kinuko Kuwahata | June 13, 2009 |
Nana becomes sick which leads to Lulu becoming very worried. She asks Amu for help, but hangs up after finding out that she is no help. However, Amu drops by Lulu's house to visit Nana. Lulu and Amu go off to buy Nana's favorites while Amu's Guardian Characters nurse her. After Nana refuses to eat, Lulu trips on the waste basket and finds out that Nana ate all of the banana yokan. Now that they know what the cause of Nana's fever is, Amu decides to go home when Lulu's mom asks Amu to sleep-over. Lulu's mom explains that she wants Lulu to become as carefree again. When Amu wakes up the next morning, Lulu thanks her. Nana is fully recovered, and temporarily forgetting that Amu and her Guardian Characters are still present, she gives away that Lulu was the one extracting ? Eggs.
| 37 | 88 | "Confrontation! The Great ? Egg Calamity!!"; Transliteration: "Gekitotsu! Nazo Tama Daibōsō!!" (Japanese: 激突! ナゾたま大暴走!!) | Kazunobu Shimizu | Toshizō Nemoto | June 20, 2009 |
Lulu admits it was her extracting all the ? Eggs and Amu asks about her dream and what it is, but Lulu tells her to leave. Afterward, Amu tells the Guardians about Lulu. While the Guardian Characters are drinking tea, Nana shows up and tells them that Lulu is not a bad person and is only doing this to make a certain person happy. Meanwhile, Lulu is handing out her necklaces telling people that it will make their dreams come true, in order to attract the Embryo. The Guardian Characters sense the presence of ? Eggs and hurry to the scene. Lulu is standing on one of the ? Eggs, waiting for the Embryo to appear. Everyone Character Transforms into Amulet Heart, Platinum Royale, Clown Drop, and Dear Baby. Amu tries to reason with Lulu, and Nana blurts out that the person she wants to make happy is her mother. Amu tells her that her mother would not be happy if she knew Lulu was using people's dreams, but Lulu takes out the necklace in her pocket and uses it against herself. Nana is quickly forced into her egg and Lulu prepares to undergo a Character Transformation.
| 38 | 89 | "Heart to Heart"; Transliteration: "Kokoro, Wakariaete." (Japanese: 心、わかりあえて。) | Mamoru Enomoto | Hiroshi Ōnogi | June 27, 2009 |
After the last episode, the ? Eggs go on a full out attack on the Guardians. While Amu is distracted, Lulu undergoes a Character Transformation, becoming Dream Dream. Amu tries to get Lulu to stop, but Lulu indirectly reveals that she has no dream and attacks her. The Guardians try to handle the ? Eggs. After helping Rima, Nagihiko asks for a retreat, but Rima says that they have to fight for everyone's dreams. Amu again tries to talk some reason into Lulu. It appears to work at first, but Lulu attacks. Amu tells her they're the same when it comes to not knowing their dreams. Lulu listens this time. Lulu sees the Embryo amidst the swarm of purified Eggs. When Lulu comes to, Nana has disappeared because Lulu had selfishly used her for her own intentions. Lulu apologizes, and the egg hatches to reveal a reborn Nana. Lulu hugs her in tears, apologizes to Amu and the Guardians, and reforms. Lulu's mother later meets her and tells her that she has worked hard for her. At home, the two talk and her mother tells her that she wanted a break from movies because Lulu was always waiting for her. The next day, Lulu leaves for France, because her mother landed a movie role. Amu and Lulu promise to meet again.
| 39 | 90 | "I Want to Tell You These Feelings!"; Transliteration: "Tsutaetai! Kono Kimochi!" (Japanese: 伝えたい! このキモチ!) | Takahiro Majima | Mamiko Ikeda | July 4, 2009 |
Yaya signs Amu and Tadase up for the "Shout Out Your Love! Doki-Doki Confession Contest," so they could investigate Easter's Death Rebel plan. At the contest, Nikaidou apologizes to Yukari, because Yukari wanted the entry prize for Utau so Nikaidou teased her. Yukari and Nikaidou blush when they realize they said that to the audience. Ami also enters the contest with the Plum Class boys. Controlled by Easter's Director, Ikuto extracts X Eggs from the audience before Tadase confesses to Amu. Amu and Tadase Character Transform into Amulet Heart and Platinum Royale. Ikuto Character Transforms into Death Rebel. For a minute, Yoru and Amu's words get to Ikuto, but he quickly changes back. Ikuto escapes and the Embryo appears when Tadase and Amu are purifying the X Eggs using Platinum Heart. Tadase thinks on how you can not only use words to tell a person how you feel, thinking back on when Amu and Yoru snapped Ikuto out of his trance with their strong feelings. Tadase remembers what he wanted to tell Amu in the contest, but he only holds Amu's hand. Amu and Tadase both smile and blush.
| 40 | 91 | "Full Throttle! My Rhythm!"; Transliteration: "Zenkai! Boku no Rizumu" (Japanese: 全開! 僕のリズム) | Mizuno Kentarō | Hanada Yuki | July 11, 2009 |
Nagihiko is filling in for some players at a basketball game. Meanwhile, Amu and Yaya tell try to make Rima feel guilty about dumping Fuyuki Kirishima. During the game, Kukai comes in and blocks Nagihiko's shoot. Later at the Garden, Nagihiko and Kukai have an arm wrestling fight as Amu sees Nagihiko's egg move. Kukai barely wins. Later, Nagihiko asks Kukai his true motive for visiting and Kukai just says if Nagihiko has found an answer yet. Also, Easter has created a machine to help lure X Eggs without Ikuto's Death Rebel. Nagihiko, Amu, and Tadase then meet three kids who call themselves "Urban Street." Nagihiko shoots a basketball and everyone is amazed. His egg moves slightly more. The next day is the exhibition game. Amu goes and gives Nagihiko his uniform for the big game. As the game starts, Easter uses its new machine and extract X Eggs from the basketball player. Amu transforms into Amulet Heart while Nagihiko challenges the X Characters to a match. He then thinks about his childhood where he remembers "Urban Street" and how playing basketball with them made him gain "his own rhythm." Rhythm finally hatches and Nagihiko Character Transforms into Beat Jumper. He makes a Beat Dunk and wins the game against the X Characters and Amu purifies them. Later as Nagihiko chats with "Urban Street," Rhythm tells Ran, Miki, Amu, and Su that they are cute, which sends Miki head over heels. Rhythm smiles and winks.
| 41 | 92 | "It's Got to Be Cool! Beat Jumper!"; Transliteration: "Kūru ni Kimero! Bīto Janpā!" (Japanese: クールに決めろ! ビートジャンパー!) | Hazuki Mizumoto | Miya Asakawa | July 18, 2009 |
When Nagihiko arrives at the Royal Garden, he says that Rhythm has worn him out by Character Changing without permission. He says on the way there were some players that accidentally kicked their ball too far, so he kicked it back, but Rhythm insisted on joining them, causing him to Character Change and get him into trouble about which club he should join. Rhythm is getting along with all the Guardian Characters except Kiseki. Kukai hearing about Nagihiko's newly born Character goes and visits them to meet Rhythm where Daichi and Rhythm become fast friends. On Amu's way home, she bumps into a little boy. She buys him taiyaki for running into him. Meanwhile, Nagihiko hears violin sounds that are coming from the Easter employees playing their new device, so he calls Tadase and tells him to round everyone up. Nagihiko tells Rima and Yaya to go look for the source while Amu and Tadase purify the eggs. They Character Transform into Amulet Spade, Platinum Royale, and Beat Jumper. The X Eggs are too fast so Nagihiko begins worrying, but Rhythm tells him to stop stressing so much. Finally, Nagihiko hits the eggs with a Beat Dunk, and Amu and Tadase use Platinum Heart to purify them. Kiseki finally accepts Rhythm after he gives him a hug. On their way home, the kid Amu bumped into comes up to her and asks her if he got the ingredients for taiyaki right, but Amu says not to worry so much. He tells her that it's just a pointless snack and runs off.
| 42 | 93 | "Hoshina Utau, Fly to the Future!"; Transliteration: "Hoshina Utau, Mirai e no Hishō!" (Japanese: ほしな歌唄、未来への飛翔!) | Murotani Yasushi | Nobuaki Yamaguchi | July 25, 2009 |
Amu and the others are invited to Utau's concert to introduce her new song, "Taiyou ga Niau Yo". Everyone goes and supports her while she sets everything up along with Yukari. During a conversation, Utau mentions Amu hasn't told her anything about Ikuto lately. Amu worries and suggests to the other Guardians not mention him in order to make Utau's concert a success. As the Guardians and Guardian Characters have a discussion about the situation with Utau and Ikuto, Yaya grows jealous, and Rima and El have suspicions due to seeing Utau and Kukai together. As everyone prepares for the concert, the Easter employees come out with the "Come Here Embryo Mk III" which can be heard from a longer distance. Just before the concert, the X Eggs of Utau's fans appear. Everyone transforms, but they seem to be having problem to handling them on their own. El goes and seeks Utau's help as Nikaidou and Yukari stall the concert. Utau saves everyone with Angel Cradle and purifies her fans' eggs. The concert goes on as a big success thanks to the help of the Guardians and providing the special effects from their power attacks. Amu hopes that Ikuto will be able to hear Utau's song someday.
| 43 | 94 | "Onward! The Calico Cat Search Party!?"; Transliteration: "Susume! Mikeneko Sōsakutai!?" (Japanese: 進め! みけねこ捜索隊!?) | Takashi Hiroshi | Toshizō Nemoto | August 1, 2009 |
Yaya brings in a stray kitten that she had found. The Guardians order their Guardian Characters to take care of the kitten, but the Guardian Characters have lost the kitten after a while. Yaya and Amu find the kitten and the Guardians propose a search party for the kitten's owner. Students from each class prepare posters, food, a cage and fliers to help find the owner. During the distribution of the fliers, Ikuto appears as Death Rebel and plays his violin, causing all the kids' eggs to turn into X Eggs. Amu, Tadase, and Nagihiko Character Transform into Amulet Heart, Platinum Royale, and Beat Jumper. As many X Eggs gather, Kazuomi shuts down the tuning fork, dissolving Ikuto's transformation. Amu and Tadase use Platinum Heart and turn all the X Eggs back to normal. Kazuomi realizes that the Embryo is not attracted to X Eggs, but the purification of X Eggs. Ikuto was forced to return to Easter. Amu, Tadase, and Nagihiko return to the normal, and everyone continues searching for the kitten's owner. The kitten's owner was then found and Yaya named the kitten Tama-chan. A poster about an upcoming violin concert features a boy bearing very strong similarities to Ikuto.
| 44 | 95 | "Rima, Yaya, and the Pearls that Bind Them!"; Transliteration: "Rima to Yaya, Shinju no Kizuna!" (Japanese: りまとやや、真珠の絆!) | Yūki Yase | Hiroshi Ōnogi | August 8, 2009 |
It's cleaning day for the entire school. Rima and Yaya are cleaning around a fountain when Yaya gets sick of it and throws her broom. She spins a statue of a frog on the fountain around and around. Suddenly, a secret passageway opens. Yaya drags Rima, Pepe, and Kusukusu into it. They come to a door and Yaya manages to get it open. They go inside to see what lies within, but instead, the door closes behind them and they are trapped. Rima begins to have flashbacks of when she was nearly kidnapped, but Yaya reassures her. Meanwhile, the others are wondering where they went off to. Kusukusu and Pepe soon find a small opening in the room they are in and crawl through it. Yaya tells Rima she is just a big baby at heart and scoots closer to her. Rima leans Yaya's head on her shoulder and tells her a story. Afterwards, they both fall asleep. They finally find the other Guardians and tell them where Rima and Yaya are. The other Guardians have found the secret passageway and soon find Rima and Yaya after opening the door. They wake them up and take them back to the Royal Garden. Tsukasa stops by and tells them that he built the room and that it was fun. However, they disagree, so he gives them cake as an apology.
| 45 | 96 | "Unheard Pleas, Shattered Feelings."; Transliteration: "Todokanai Koe, Kudakareru Omoi." (Japanese: 届かない声、くだかれる思い.) | Yūsaku Saotome | Kinuko Kuwahata | August 15, 2009 |
While taking Ami shopping, Amu sees a poster that Easter has produced. It says it's starring DL, but DL is really Ikuto under their control. The Guardians decide to go to the concert the next day. They try to interview DL, but security is too strict. While the other Guardians distract the staff, Amu and Tadase manage to get backstage. They find Ikuto, and Yoru attempts to get him, but Ikuto won't budge. He refuses to talk to Amu or Tadase. Security finds Amu and Tadase, and kicks them out. They decide to listen to the concert and protect everyone's Hearts' Eggs. When Ikuto performs, X Eggs are extracted from the audience. The Guardians transform, but only Amu and Tadase go after Ikuto. Yoru joins them, but he can't get Ikuto to come to his senses. Instead, they get hit with powder that enables them to move. Tadase also tries to talk to Ikuto about the past, but he walks off, still under complete control. Amu and Tadase use Platinum Heart to purify the eggs. Amu asks Tadase what exactly happened between him and Ikuto, and Tadase agrees to tell her.
| 46 | 97 | "Tadase and Ikuto, the Horoscope of Fate!"; Transliteration: "Tadase to Ikuto, Unmei no Horosukōpu!" (Japanese: 唯世とイクト, 運命のホロスコープ!) | Kazunobu Shimizu | Hanada Yuki | August 22, 2009 |
In the past, Yui entrusts a young Tadase with the Dumpty Key. One day, the Tsukiyomi siblings come to Tadase's place. Mizue talks with Tsukasa about being uneasy with them here. Tadase, Utau, and Ikuto would play together: sometimes Ikuto would play the violin for them when asked. After the kids' playing breaks a vase, Tadase's mother and grandmother talk about Ikuto and Aruto Tsukiyomi. Early the next morning, Tadase and Betty see Ikuto go off without a word. When Tadase was around his current age after arriving from school, he sees Betty dead, with Ikuto by her side. He asks why, but Tadase sees the Dumpty Key in Ikuto's hands. Tadase's grandmother later falls in critical condition, and since then, Tadase believed his mother's words about Ikuto. In the present, Tadase's unsure of the past now, but things are too vague to really know. They go into a secret room behind the principal's office to see Tsukasa and find him with prepared tea. Tsukasa reveals he took Ikuto away during a bad predicament. He has arranged for someone outside the school to assist them. In Easter, Kazuomi goes to tell Gozen he will have the Embryo soon, but he's not in his office. Kazuomi says that he will get it for Hikaru.
| 47 | 98 | "Reborn!! My Radiant Dancing Princess!"; Transliteration: "Fukkatsu! Kagayaki no Maihime!" (Japanese: 復活! 輝きの舞姫!) | Murotani Yasushi | Toshizō Nemoto | August 29, 2009 |
Amu and the Guardians meet a hesitant Yuu Nikaidou who takes them to a recently used office. Using Yukari's birthdate, they hack into the computer and learn the Death Rebel music will be broadcast on the radio. The Guardians go back to the city and find Nobuko Saeki. Thanks to a horoscope reading, Ikuto will be found in a theme park, with a violin concert held on the grand opening. At the theme park's tower, the scientists do one final check, then begin the broadcast. X Eggs gather to the tower. Ikuto begins to feel pain, but Kazuomi forces him to play again. While the Guardians go to the tower, Rima falls behind, so Nagihiko stays to help her. Rima says she won't hold hands with a liar, as she has heard Nobuko's accurate guess about Nagihiko and Nadeshiko being the same person. Amu, Tadase, and Yaya arrive at a spot where many X Eggs have gathered. The three go on ahead while Clown Drop and Beat Jumper handle them. Nagihiko remembers a time after a recital when he was still disguised. Rima tells the voices of the affected children that there are things they can't do, but it makes everyone unique and makes them try harder. Temari's egg reacts and hatches, and Nagihiko Character Transforms with her to become Yamato Maihime.
| 48 | 99 | "Our Feelings United! The Guardians' Battle!"; Transliteration: "Omoi wa Hitotsu! Gādian no Tatakai!" (Japanese: 思いは一つ! ガーディアンの戦い!) | Takashi Hiroshi | Miya Asakawa | September 5, 2009 |
Picking up from last episode, Yamato Maihime descends to meet up with Clown Drop. Temari is happy to meet Nagihiko again and she tells him to dance to his heart's content. Releasing a gentle breeze of wind energy as he dances, he sends the X Eggs head over heels. More come, so Nagihiko asks Rima to join him. Both perform Queen's Waltz, purifying the X Eggs. Tadase, Yaya, and Amu witness this, then go off. From the sound of the violin comes a black dog waiting for them in the wax museum. This dog turns out to be injected with X Egg energy, so Yaya Character Transforms to Dear Baby. She attacks with Ducky Dash, but this provokes the dog, so Amu and Tadase transform to Amulet Heart and Platinum Royale. The two attack, but when they get cornered, Yaya steps in. She says that though she wants to stay a baby character, sometimes the inexperienced have to step in and fight. Yaya uses Merry Merry Double Block to distract the dog, then uses Duckies Scramble, Go Go. An angel feather falls from the sky, it's Utau as Seraphic Charm who has come as backup. Utau also attack using White Wing. She compliments Yaya for her hard work, then tells Amu and Tadase to go. Switching to Lunatic Charm, she attacks with Nightmare Lorelei. Yaya uses Black Duckies, Go Go to seduce the dog. Switching back to Seraphic Charm, Utau uses Angel Cradle to purify the X Eggs. Amu and Tadase confront Ikuto as Death Rebel. Ikuto turns the violin to the Death Scythe and attacks. Tadase tries to get through to Ikuto, his staff turns into the Royal Sword. Holy Saber and Dark Night Storm negate one another and they fight. The Dumpty Key gets cut off and it and the Humpty Lock react. Amu sees a vision of a young boy crying. In reality, Humpty Lock and Dumpty Key unite, causing a brilliant light to wash over the area.
| 49 | 100 | "The Birth of Two Character Transformations!"; Transliteration: "Tanjō! Futatsu no Kyara Nari!" (Japanese: 誕生! 2つのキャラなり!) | Hazuki Mizumoto | Mamiko Ikeda | September 12, 2009 |
The Humpty Lock and the Dumpty Key are united. In a shining void, Tadase, Amu, Miki, and Su are trapped in bubbles, unsure as to where they are. A bubble begins replaying past events: A young Utau and Ikuto are outside the waiting room of a hospital, waiting for their mother. Ikuto tells her not to cry. In Tadase's house, a young Tadase runs over to Ikuto and Utau. His mother says they will be living with them. Tsukasa talks to Ikuto later, and shows him a bird learning to fly. Later that evening, Ikuto has given birth to Yoru's egg. Tsukasa delivers Alto's violin to Ikuto. They talk about Alto leaving and the current state of the family. The reason why Ikuto left one day is to come with Tsukasa to learn more about his father. During a snowy day in town, Tsukasa realizes that his wallet was lost, so Ikuto plays the violin. This gets the attention of bystanders, who give money. While playing the violin one day, an old woman gives him a photo of Alto. Ikuto cries over this, and as Tsukasa comforts him, Yoru is born. Easter finally finds him, and Tsukasa is too late to get him. In the void, the bubbles flash forward to today: Tadase learns the truth of what happened to Betty. Amu says this isn't Ikuto's would-be self and triggers the full power of the Humpty Lock. Miki, Su, Tadase, and Amu are thrown back to the real world, and Ran also returns. After the light clears, Amu has Character Transformed to Amulet Diamond with a reborn Diamond. She uses Shooting Star Shower to stop the fight and comes down to embrace Ikuto. Ikuto is freed from the Death Rebel trance, Ran, Miki, Su, and Yoru arrive and Yoru happily cries now that his owner is free. The Humpty Lock again triggers and the Dumpty Key does so as well. Ikuto Character Transforms into Seven Seas Treasure. Amu also transforms, turning into Amulet Fortune.
| 50 | 101 | "The Torn Picture Book! The Tragic Secret!"; Transliteration: "Yabukareta Ehon! Kanashiki Himitsu!" (Japanese: 破かれた絵本! 悲しき秘密!) | Yūki Yase | Toshizō Nemoto | September 19, 2009 |
Amulet Fortune and Seven Seas Treasure descend to the tower. While descending, both Amu and Ikuto take note of their new forms. Platinum Royale catches up to them, and Tadase forgives Ikuto. Kazuomi tries to retake control of Ikuto, to no avail. The X Eggs gather into one giant X Character. Ikuto promptly saves Amu from an attack by using Emerald Line. Tadase and Ikuto team up, using their attacks to break the giant X Character apart. Amu uses Open Heart to purify the X Eggs. The Embryo shows up, the transformation are called off (with a now purified Black Egg), and the scientists use the Embryo Catcher to get it. Kazuomi takes it and he rushes out to the elevator. More X Eggs appear, the timely arrival of Seraphic Charm and Dear Baby drives them away. Beat Jumper and Clown Drop come in as well. The scientists tell the gang there is a secret room only accessible by elevator in the Tower. Tadase, Amu, and Ikuto go off thanks to encouragement by the rest. At Gozen's room, Kazuomi presents the Embryo to Gozen, who is revealed to be a boy named Hikaru. He dismisses the Embryo as worthless, and captures the three in cages. The Embryo loses its shine and Tsukasa comes in. Apparently, after his parents' death, Hikaru was raised to be the boss for Easter, but he wasn't taught happiness and love. This in turn made his heart empty. Tsukasa shows the young Hikaru a picture book, but he angrily dismisses it as pointless and rips a page out of it. More X Eggs begin to gather, breaking the ceiling of the room. The episode ends in a cliffhanger as everyone looks up at the impending danger.
| 51 | 102 | "The Dream Egg, Who I Want to Be."; Transliteration: "Yume no Tamago, Naritai Jibun." (Japanese: 夢のたまご、なりたい自分.) | Mamoru Enomoto | Hiroshi Ōnogi | September 26, 2009 |
After last episode, the X Eggs smash through the ceiling and smash the cages holding Amu, Tadase, and Ikuto. They take Hikaru and the Embryo up to the top of the tower. Amu becomes Amulet Heart, Ikuto becomes Black Lynx, and Tadase become Platinum Royale. They go back up to meet the group and witness the reforming of the giant X Character. Amu and Ikuto reveal that Hikaru is Gozen, Easter's boss. Slash Claw and Holy Saber break the X Character apart, but it reforms. Seraphic Charm, Clown Drop, and Dear Baby work together to get Hikaru on ground. The Giant X Character begins crying, and everyone begins to feel sad. Amu fights on and tries to explain to Hikaru nothing is useless after Kazuomi blocks an attack. The Humpty Lock glows brightly and Amu uses Open Heart Full Volume! to purify the giant X Character. After the dust cleared, Hikaru explains that he collected gems in an attempt to fill the void in his heart. Amu explains that what he was actually looking for was feelings. Ran, Miki, Su, and Diamond explain that even though his Heart's Egg is gone, the Guardian Characters are always with him. The Embryo regains it radiance and is revealed to be Hikaru's Heart's Egg, which promptly goes back into its owner. Hikaru begins crying, and Kazuomi apologizes to Hikaru as what he wanted was Hikaru to be happy. After everything, Ikuto tells Amu that he has a secret to confess and kisses her on the cheek and leaves a jealous Tadase and Utau, and a burned out Amu. Everyone goes their separate ways. The next day, the Guardians have a meeting about their success. Yaya reveals that Utau is having another concert. Now that Utau is famous, Yukari is planning on moving to a bigger office. Nikaidou, Kukai, and Kairi are already packing. The Guardians are handling some stray X Characters, and Tadase asks if Amu likes Ikuto. She quickly denies any feelings for him, and she asks why. That question has been on Tadase's mind and Amu sees Tadase for who he is. The X Eggs come, and thanks to Tadase, Amu purifies them. The remaining three think that Amu and Tadase are in love, and Amu gets flustered.

== See also ==
- List of Shugo Chara! episodes (01-51)
- List of Shugo Chara Party! episodes (103-127)
