= We Are Buono! =

- Regular edition cover

Studio album by Buono!
- Released: February 10, 2010 (JP)
- Genre: J-pop
- Label: Pony Canyon

Buono! chronology
Buono!2 (2009)	We Are Buono! (2010)	The Best Buono! (2010)

Singles from We Are Buono!
- 1. "MY BOY" Released: April 29, 2009; 2. "Take It Easy!" Released: August 26, 2009; 3. "Bravo☆Bravo" Released: December 16, 2009; 4. "Our Songs" Released: February 3, 2010

We Are Buono! is the third album from the J-pop idol group, Buono!. The album was released on February 10, 2010, under the Pony Canyon label. A limited-edition version included a trading card selected randomly from four, and a DVD.

== Track listings ==
=== CD ===
1. "One Way = My Way"
2. "Our Songs"
3. "Independent Girl～Dokuritsu Joshi De Aru Tame Ni" (Independent Girl～独立女子であるために)
4. "MY BOY"
5. "Urahara" (うらはら)
6. "Take It Easy!"
7. "Bravo☆Bravo"
8. "Kataomoi" (カタオモイ)
9. "Blue-Sky-Blue"
10. "Koucha No Oishii Mise" (紅茶の美味しい店)
11. "Tabidachi No Uta" (タビダチの歌)
12. "We are Buono!～Buono!'s Theme" (We are Buono!～Buono!のテーマ)
