= Ren'ai Rider =

"Renai♥Rider"

Single by Buono!

from the album Café Buono!
- B-side: "Janakya Mottainai!"
- Released: February 6, 2008; February 13, 2008 (Single V)
- Genre: J-pop; Pop punk
- Label: Pony Canyon
- Composer: Akirastar
- Lyricist: Yuho Iwasato
- Producer: Tsunku

Buono! singles chronology
"Honto no Jibun" (2007)	"Renai♥Rider" (2008)	"Kiss! Kiss! Kiss!" (2008)

Music video
- "Renai♥Rider" on YouTube

Renai♥Rider (恋愛♥ライダー, Renai Raidā; "Love Rider") is the title of the second single by the Hello! Project unit Buono!. The title song is used for the second ending theme of Shugo Chara!.

The single was released on February 6, 2008, in Japan under the Pony Canyon label in regular and limited edition versions. The limited edition release, includes a DVD and trading card.

The Single V version was released on February 13, 2008, titled Single V "Renai♥Rider" (シングルV「恋愛♥ライダー」).

== Track listing ==
=== CD ===
1. "Renai♥Rider" (恋愛♥ライダー; "Love Rider")
2. "Janakya Mottainai!" (じゃなきゃもったいないっ!; "Otherwise, It's a Waste!")
3. "Renai♥Rider (Instrumental)"
4. "Janakya Mottainai! (Instrumental)"

=== Single V DVD ===
1. "Renai♥Rider (Music Clip)" (恋愛♥ライダー<Music Clip>)
2. "Renai♥Rider (Music Clip Making)" (恋愛♥ライダー<Music Clip Making>)
3. "Renai♥Rider (Close Up Version)" (恋愛♥ライダー<Close Up Version>)

== Oricon ranks and sales ==
Daily	Weekly	Sales
3	7	35,254

== Television performances ==
- Haromoni@ (February 10, 2008)
- Uta Doki (February 11, 2008)
- Music Japan (February 15, 2008)
