= Buono! 2 =

Buono!2
- Regular edition cover

Studio album by Buono!
- Released: February 11, 2009 (JP)
- Genre: J-pop
- Length: 51:54
- Label: Pony Canyon

Buono! chronology
Café Buono! (2008)	Buono!2 (2009)	We Are Buono! (2010)

Singles from Buono!2
- 1. "Kiss! Kiss! Kiss!" Released: May 14, 2008; 2. "Gachinko de Ikō!" Released: August 20, 2008; 3. "Rottara Rottara" Released: November 12, 2008; 4. "Co-no-Mi-chi" Released: January 21, 2009

Buono!2 (read as "Buono! Buono!") is the second album from the J-pop idol group, Buono!. The album was released on February 11, 2009, under the Pony Canyon label, in a regular version and a limited-edition version. The regular edition (catalog number PCCA-02840) comes with a Buono! photocard, while the limited edition (PCCA-02839) includes a different photocard and a DVD. Its peak position on the Oricon weekly chart was #7.

The album includes several of Buono!'s previous singles– "Kiss! Kiss! Kiss!", "Gachinko de Ikō!", "Rottara Rottara" and "Co-no-Mi-chi"– while also including the coupling tracks of "Kiss! Kiss! Kiss!" and "Minna Daisuki".

== Track listings ==
=== CD ===
1. "Early Bird"
2. "Kiss! Kiss! Kiss!"
3. "Kira Kira" (キラキラ, Sparkling)
4. "Shōshitsuten -Vanishing Point-" (消失点ーVanishing Pointー)
5. "Rottara Rottara" (ロッタラ ロッタラ)
6. "Co-no-Mi-chi" (co・no・mi・chi, Kono Michi; This Road)
7. "Minna Daisuki" (みんなだいすき, Love Everyone)
8. "I Need You"
9. "Gachinko de Ikō!" (ガチンコでいこう!, Do Your Best and Go!)
10. "You're My Friend"
11. "Over the Rainbow"
12. "Gōru" (ゴール, Goal)

=== Limited edition DVD ===
1. "Jacket Photography Making Of" (ジャケット撮影メイキング)
2. "TV Spot Collection" (テレビスポット集)
  - "Kiss! Kiss! Kiss!" (15 second and 30 second advert)
  - "Gachinko de Ikō!" (15 second and 30 second advert)
  - "Rottara Rottara" (15 second and 30 second advert)
  - "Co-no-Mi-chi" (15 second and 30 second advert)
