= Café Buono! =

- Regular Edition cover

Studio album by Buono!
- Released: February 20, 2008 (JP)
- Genre: J-pop
- Length: 51:54
- Label: Pony Canyon
- Producer: Tsunku

Buono! chronology
Café Buono! (2008)	Buono!2 (2009)

Alternative cover
- Limited Edition Cover

Singles from Café Buono!
- 1. "Honto no Jibun" Released: October 31, 2007; 2. "Renai Rider" Released: February 6, 2008

Café Buono! is the first album from the J-pop idol group, Buono! released on February 20, 2008. The standard album comes with a Buono! photocard while the limited edition, first press version includes a different photocard and a DVD.

== Track listing ==
=== CD ===
1. "Café Buono!"
2. "Nakimushi Shonen" (泣き虫少年, lit. Crybaby Boy)
3. "Renai Rider" (恋愛♥ライダー, lit. Love Rider)
4. "Honto no Jibun" (ホントのじぶん, lit. True Self)
5. "Baketsu no Mizu" (バケツの水, lit. Bucket of Water)
6. "Garakuta no Yume" (ガラクタノユメ, lit. Rubbish Dreams)
7. "Internet Cupid"
8. "Last Forever"
9. "Kokoro no Tamago" (こころのたまご, lit. Hearts' Egg)
10. "Hoshi no Hitsujitachi" (星の羊たち, lit. Sheep of the Stars)
11. "Rock no Kamisama" (ロックの神様, Rokku no Kamisama, lit. God of Rock)
12. "Kimi ga Ireba" (君がいれば, lit. If You're Here)

=== Limited edition DVD ===
1. "Kokoro no Tamago (Dance Shot version)" (こころのたまご)
2. "Renai Rider (Dance Shot version)" (恋愛 ライダー)
3. "CD Jacket Making Of" (ジャケット撮影メイキング)
4. "Shugo Chara! Promotion Video" (しゅごキャラ！プロモーション映像)

== Oricon ranks and sales ==
Year	Peak position		Sales
Year	Daily	Weekly	Sales
2008	5	11	23,782
