= Gachinko de Ikō! =

Single by Buono!

from the album Buono!2
- B-side: "Lady Panther!"
- Released: August 20, 2008; September 3, 2008 (Single V)
- Recorded: 2008
- Genre: Japanese pop, pop punk
- Label: Pony Canyon
- Composers: Tetsuya Muramatsu; Susumu Nishikawa
- Lyricist: Yuho Iwasato
- Producer: Tsunku

Buono! singles chronology
"Kiss! Kiss! Kiss!" (2008)	"Gachinko de Ikō!" (2008)	"Rottara Rottara" (2008)

Music video
- "Gachinko de Ikō!" on YouTube

Gachinko de Ikō! (ガチンコでいこう!; "Let's Go Earnestly!") is the fourth single by the Hello! Project unit Buono!. The title song was used as the fourth ending theme of anime Shugo Chara! from July until September 2008. The single was released on August 20, 2008, in Japan under the Pony Canyon label in two different versions: regular (PCCA.70223) and limited (PCCA.02731). The limited edition contained a bonus DVD containing "making of" footage for the PV, while both the limited edition and first press of the normal edition came with a serial number card, used in a promotional draw, and an original Buono! trading card, with the picture on the card differing by edition. The Single V DVD was released on September 3, 2008. The single peaked at #6 on the weekly Oricon charts, and charted for five weeks.

== Track listing ==
=== CD ===
No.	Title	Lyrics	Music	Length
1.	"Gachinko de Ikō!" (ガチンコでいこう!, "Do Your Best and Go!")	Yuho Iwasato	Tetsuya Muramatsu, Susumu Nishikawa
2.	"Lady Panther!" (れでぃぱんさぁ!, Redi Pansaa!)	Natsuki Kawakami	Seiichirō Sugiura, Kaoru Ōkubo
3.	"Gachinko de Ikō! (Instrumental)"		Tetsuya Muramatsu, Susumu Nishikawa
4.	"Lady Panther! (Instrumental)"		Seiichirō Sugiura, Kaoru Ōkubo

=== Limited edition DVD ===
No.	Title	Length
1.	"Jacket Photography: Making Of" (ジャケット撮影メイキング, Jacket Satsuei Making)
2.	"PV Shooting: Making Of, Part 1" (PV撮影メイキングPart.1, PV Satsuei Making Part.1)

=== Single V ===
No.	Title	Length
1.	"Gachinko de Ikō! (Music Clip)"
2.	"Gachinko de Ikō! (Close Up Version)"
3.	"Gachinko de Ikō! (Dance Shot Version)"
4.	"PV Shooting: Making Of, Part 2" (PV撮影メイキング Part.2, PV Satsuei Making Part.2)

== Oricon rank and sales ==
Daily rank	Weekly rank	Number sold
4	6	31,005
