= Rottara Rottara =

Single by Buono!

from the album Buono!2
- B-side: "My Love"
- Released: November 12, 2008; December 3, 2008 (Single V)
- Genre: J-pop, power pop, pop punk
- Label: Pony Canyon
- Composer: Shinjiro Inoue
- Lyricist: Yuho Iwasato
- Producer: Tsunku

Buono! singles chronology
"Gachinko de Ikou!" (2008)	"Rottara Rottara" (2008)	"Co-no-Mi-chi" (2009)

Music videos
- Rottara Rottara on YouTube
- Rottara Rottara (TV Program Ver.) on YouTube

Rottara Rottara (ロッタラ ロッタラ; "Lotta Love Lotta Love") is the fifth single by the Hello! Project unit Buono!. The title song is used for the first ending theme of Shugo Chara!! Doki—.

The single was released on November 12, 2008, in Japan under the Pony Canyon label in two different versions; the regular edition only included a CD while the limited edition also included a DVD.

The Single V DVD of the single was released on December 3, 2008.

== Track listing ==
=== CD ===
1. "Rottara Rottara" (ロッタラ ロッタラ; "Lotta Love Lotta Love")
2. "My Love" (マイラブ, Mai Rabu)
3. "Rottara Rottara (Instrumental)"
4. "My Love (Instrumental)"
