= Kiss! Kiss! Kiss! (Buono! song) =

Single by Buono!

from the album Buono!2
- B-side: "Minna Daisuki!"
- Released: May 14, 2008; June 18, 2008 (Single V)
- Recorded: 2008
- Genre: J-pop; Pop punk
- Label: Pony Canyon
- Composers: Shinjirō Inoue; Susumu Nishikawa
- Lyricist: Yuho Iwasato
- Producer: Tsunku

Buono! singles chronology
"Ren'ai Rider" (2008)	"Kiss! Kiss! Kiss!" (2008)	"Gachinko de Ikō!" (2008)

Music videos
- "Kiss! Kiss! Kiss!" on YouTube
- "Kiss! Kiss! Kiss!" (Band Ver.) on YouTube

"Kiss! Kiss! Kiss!" is a song by the Hello! Project unit Buono! from their album Buono! 2 (2009). The song was written by Yūho Iwasato, Shinjirō Inoue, and Susumu Nishikawa and produced by Tsunku. It was released on May 14, 2008, as the album's third single. The Single V (PCBP.51918) was released on June 18, 2008. The single peaked at number four on the weekly Oricon charts, and charted for six weeks.

== Release ==
The single was released on May 14, 2008, in Japan under the Pony Canyon label in two different versions: regular (PCCA.70215) and limited (PCCA.02672). The normal edition came with only the normal CD, while the limited edition was packaged with a special DVD. Both the limited edition and first press of the regular edition came with a serial number card, used in a promotional draw, and a Buono! trading card.

"Kiss! Kiss! Kiss!" was used as the third ending theme of the anime Shugo Chara! (2006–2009). "Minna Daisuki", the B-side, was used as the second opening theme. The PV was shot on-location in a real school.

== Track listings ==
=== CD ===
No.	Title	Lyrics	Music	Length
1.	"Kiss! Kiss! Kiss!"	Yuho Iwasato	Shinjirō Inoue, Susumu Nishikawa
2.	"Minna Daisuki" (みんなだいすき, "I Love You All!")	C.Piece	Akirastar, Jun Abe
3.	"Kiss! Kiss! Kiss! (Instrumental)"		Shinjirō Inoue, Susumu Nishikawa
4.	"Minna Daisuki (Instrumental)"		Akirastar, Jun Abe

=== Limited edition DVD ===
No.	Title	Length
1.	"PV Jacket Photography: Making Of, Part 1" (PV・ジャケット撮影メイキング Part.1, PV - Jacket Satsuei Making Part.1)

=== Single V ===
No.	Title	Length
1.	"Kiss! Kiss! Kiss! (Music Clip)"
2.	"Kiss! Kiss! Kiss! (Close Up Version)"
3.	"Kiss! Kiss! Kiss! (Dance Shot Version)"
4.	"Kiss! Kiss! Kiss! (Band Version)"
5.	"PV Jacket Photography: Making Of, Part 2" (PV・ジャケット撮影メイキング Part.2, PV - Jacket Satsuei Making Part.2)

== Live performances ==
- 2008-05-15 Music Japan
- 2008-05-16 Music Fighter

== Oricon rank and Sales (Single CD) ==
Daily	Weekly	Sales
2	4	36,675

== Oricon rank and sales (Single V) ==
Daily	Weekly	Sales
6	8	6,445
