= Our Songs (song) =

Single by Buono!

from the album Our Songs
- B-side: "MIRACLE HAPPY LOVE SONG"
- Released: February 3, 2010
- Recorded: 2010
- Genre: J-pop
- Length: n/a
- Label: Pony Canyon
- Composer: Tsunku
- Lyricist: Yoshiko Miura
- Producers: Tsunku, Hiroshi Takigawa

Buono! singles chronology
| "Bravo☆Bravo" (2009) | "Our Songs" (2010) | "Zassō no Uta" (2011) |

Music video
- Our Songs on YouTube

"Our Songs" is the title of the tenth single by Hello! Project unit Buono!. The group consists of Momoko Tsugunaga, Miyabi Natsuyaki and Airi Suzuki. The single was released on February 3, 2010, in Japan, under the Pony Canyon label in two different versions: regular and limited. The limited edition came with a serial number card that was used in a promotional draw, a special DVD, a Buono! trading card and an alternative cover. The DVD contains footage from the principal photography of the single. The first press of both editions came with a photo card. The Single V was released on December 22, 2009. The single peaked at #8 on the weekly Oricon charts, selling 13,220 copies in its first week.

To commemorate the group's first live tour, copies of the CD were sold during their performance at Tokyo Kōsei Nenkin Kaikan. Buyers entered a lottery to win an autographed poster presented by the girls.

== Track listing ==
=== CD ===
| No. | Title | Length |
|---|---|---|
| 1. | "Our Songs" | 3:50 |
| 2. | "MIRACLE HAPPY LOVE SONG" |
| 3. | "Our Songs" (Instrumental) | 3:50 |
| 4. | "MIRACLE HAPPY LOVE SONG" (Instrumental) |

=== Limited Edition DVD ===
| No. | Title | Length |
|---|---|---|
| 1. | "Jacket Photography: Making Of" (ジャケット撮影メイキング, Jacket Satsuei Making) |
