= Yuho Iwasato =

- 岩里 祐穂
- Born: December 3, 1957 (age 68); Niigata, Niigata Prefecture, Japan
- Other name: Yuko Iwasaki (1980–1983)
- Citizenship: Japan
- Education: B.A. in Japanese History
- Alma mater: Chuo University
- Occupations: Lyricist; essayist
- Years active: 1980–present
- Musical career
- Genres: Japanese pop; city pop
- Label: King Records
- Website: yuhoiwasato.com

Yuho Iwasato (岩里 祐穂, Iwasato Yūho; born December 3, 1957) is a Japanese lyricist and essayist. Born in Niigata, she debuted as a singer-songwriter in 1980 under the name "Yuko Iwasaki," and transitioned to full-time lyricist in 1988 following her collaborations with Miki Imai. Iwasato has collaborated with multiple music producers, including Tomoyasu Hotei, Yoko Kanno, Yobun Teraoka, Jeff Miyahara, and Katsutoshi Kitagawa of Round Table, and is known for her work across multiple genres, including hits for Japanese idol artists and anime songs.

She has provided lyrics to artists including Chiemi Hori, Miho Nakayama, Miki Imai, Maaya Sakamoto, Yui Aragaki, Tomoyasu Hotei, Kana Hanazawa, May J., Momoiro Clover Z, and Sexy Zone (formerly Sexy Zone), as well as theme songs for anime such as The Vision of Escaflowne, Cardcaptor Sakura, Macross Frontier, Cowboy Bebop, and The Ancient Magus' Bride, as well as TV series such as Kaizoku Sentai Gokaiger. In 2009, she received the Silver Prize from the Japanese Society for Rights of Authors, Composers and Publishers for her work on "Genesis of Aquarion."

== Biography ==
Iwasato was born in Niigata City, Niigata Prefecture. She graduated from Chuo University with a degree from the Faculty of Letters, Department of History, specializing in Japanese history. In 1980, she debuted as a singer-songwriter under the name "Yuko Iwasaki" (いわさきゆうこ, Iwasaki Yūko) However, she quickly realized performing was not suited to her, as she disliked appearing in public or being photographed, and decided to focus on writing lyrics after one year. In 1983, she changed her pen name to "Yuho Iwasato" and made her debut as a lyricist and composer with Chiemi Hori's "Sayonara no Monogatari." During the early 1980s idol kayōkyoku boom, she wrote three singles for Hori amid her breakout in the drama Stewardess Monogatari: "Sayonara no Monogatari," "Natsuiro Diary," and "Aoi Natsu no Epilogue," forming a trilogy. She also wrote "Bin Kan Rouge," an insert song for the anime Creamy Mami, the Magic Angel, which became the first lyrics she wrote for an anime song.

Her encounter with Miki Imai in 1988 led her to focus exclusively on lyric writing. Notable early successes include Imai's 1989 single "Hitomi ga Hohoemu kara," which charted for forty weeks on the Oricon Singles Chart, and her 1991 hit "Piece of My Wish," which reached number one on the Oricon chart, selling over one million copies. Her 1994 song for Imai, "Miss You," also topped the Oricon chart.

In 1996, through Imai's album Love Of My Life, Iwasato met composer Yoko Kanno, which subsequently led to begin working on Maaya Sakamoto's singing debut on the anime The Vision of Escaflowne.

In 2016, she released a compilation album entitled Ms. Lyricist for celebrating her thirty-fifth anniversary in the music industry.

== Works ==
=== Albums ===
- Magical Liqueur (Note: LP released under the name Yuko Iwasaki; re-issued on CD format in 2016.) (1980, King Records)

=== Books ===
- Koi no Kiroku (1996, Magazine House)
- Iikagen ni Katazukete Utsukushiku Kurasu (2005, Shueisha)
- Osōji, Ryōri ga Nigate Demo, Kaji ga Motto Suki ni Naru (2006, Shueisha)
- Hon no Sukoshi de Kurashi Jōzu Ouchi Jōzu (2008, Shueisha)

=== Songwriting credits ===
- Chiemi Hori – "Sayonara no Monogatari" (1983)
- Miki Imai – "Hitomi ga Hohoemu Kara" (1989)
- Miki Imai – "Piece of My Wish" (1991)
- Miki Imai – "Miss You" (1994)
- Maaya Sakamoto – "Yakusoku wa Iranai" (Note: TV anime series The Vision of Escaflowne opening theme song.) (1997)
- Maaya Sakamoto – "Kiseki no Umi" (Note: TV anime series Record of Lodoss War opening theme song.) (1998)
- Maaya Sakamoto – "Platinum" (Note: TV anime series Cardcaptor Sakura: Sakura Card Act opening theme song.) (1999)
- Maaya Sakamoto - "Hemisphere" (Note: TV anime series RahXephon opening theme song.) (2002)
- Maaya Sakamoto - "Tune the Rainbow" (Note: Anime film RahXephon: Pluralitas Concentio opening theme song.) (2003)
- Maaya Sakamoto - "More Than Words" (Note: Original video animation Code Geass: Akito the Exiled theme song.) (2012)
- Maaya Sakamoto - "Shiawase ni Tsuite Watashi ga Shitte Iru Itsutsu no Hōhō" (Note: TV anime series Gourmet Girl Graffiti opening theme song.) (2015)
- Maaya Sakamoto - "Un_mute" (Note: TV anime series Revenger ending theme song.) (2023)
- Maaya Sakamoto - "Drops" (Note: TV anime series Once Upon a Witch's Death opening theme song.) (2025)
- Mai Yamane - "The Real Folk Blues" (Note: TV anime series Cowboy Bebop ending theme song.) (1998)
- Akino - "Genesis of Aquarion" (Note: TV anime series Genesis of Aquarion opening theme song.) (2005)
- Buono! - "Honto no Jibun" (2007)
- Buono! - "Kiss! Kiss! Kiss!" (2008)
- Buono! - "Gachinko de Ikō!" (2008)
- Sheryl Nome (May'n) - "Northern Cross" (Note: TV anime series Macross Frontier ending theme song.) (2008)
- Momoiro Clover Z – "Saraba, Itoshiki Kanashimi-tachi yo" (2012)
- Momoiro Clover Z vs. Kiss – "Yume no Ukiyo ni Saite Mi na" (2015)
- Kana Hanazawa - "Koisuru Wakusei" (2013)
- Kana Hanazawa - "Hohoemi Mode" (2014)
- Shoko Nakagawa – "Doridori" (Note: TV anime series Pokémon the Series: XY ending theme song.) (2015)
- Shoko Nakagawa – "Across the World" (Note: Anime film Mobile Suit Gundam: Silver Phantom ending theme song.) (2024)
- Sexy Zone – "Kimi ni Hitomebore" (2014)
- Sexy Zone – "Cha-Cha-Cha Champion" (2015)
- Junna - "Here" (Note: TV anime series The Ancient Magus' Bride opening theme song.) (2017)
- May'n - "You" (Note: TV anime series The Ancient Magus' Bride 2nd opening theme song.) (2017)
- TeddyLoid feat. Yoshikazu Mera - "Red Doors" (Note: TV anime series 18if opening theme song.) (2017)
- Kiyono Yasuno - "Rocket Beat" (Note: TV anime series Cardcaptor Sakura: Clear Card 2nd opening theme song.) (2018)
- Minori Suzuki - "Musical" (Note: TV anime series Sugar Apple Fairy Tale opening theme song.) (2023)
- Sumire Morohoshi - "Kanaeru" (Note: TV anime series Sugar Apple Fairy Tale ending theme song.) (2023)
