= Honto no Jibun =

Single by Buono!

from the album Café Buono!
- B-side: "Kokoro no Tamago"
- Released: October 31, 2007; November 21, 2007 (Single V)
- Recorded: 2007
- Genre: J-pop; pop rock; teen pop
- Length: 16:07
- Label: Pony Canyon
- Composer: Yoshiyuki Kinoshita
- Lyricist: Yuho Iwasato
- Producer: Tsunku

Buono! singles chronology
"Honto no Jibun" (2007)	"Ren'ai Rider" (2008)

Music video
- "Honto no Jibun" on YouTube

"Honto no Jibun" (ホントのじぶん; lit. True Self) is the title of the first single by the Hello! Project unit Buono!. Maimi Yajima and Chisato Okai appear as background characters in the song's Promotional Video.

It was first performed on August 22, 2007 at Odaiba's Palette Town and later on Cute's 'Hōkago no Essence' Fall Concert (September 30, 2007) and the 2007 Morning Musume Cultural Festival, on October 7 and October 8, 2007.

"Honto no Jibun" was released on October 31, 2007, in Japan under the Pony Canon label in two different versions, regular and limited, the latter of which included an additional DVD. The single was issued as the theme song for the Japanese animated television series Shugo Chara!.

The single V version was released on November 21, 2007. It was used as the first ending theme for the Shugo Chara! anime.

== Track listings ==
=== CD ===
1. "Honto no Jibun" (ホントのじぶん, True Self)
2. "Kokoro no Tamago" (こころのたまご, Egg of the Heart)
3. "Honto no Jibun" (Instrumental)
4. "Kokoro no Tamago" (Instrumental)

=== DVD ===
1. Honto no Jibun Dance shot ver. (「ホントのじぶん」 Dance shot ver.)
2. Buono's Debut Event (August 22, 2007 performance at Odaiba Palette Town) (Buono!お披露目イベント映像(2007.8.22 お台場パレットタウン))

== Oricon rank and sales ==
Mon	Tue	Wed	Thu	Fri	Sat	Sun	Week Rank	Sales
–	3	5	8	7	8	10	5	29,715
8	44	44	48	43	34	35	36	3,746
41	–	–	–	–	50	–	62	1,820
–	–	–	–	–	–	–	97	1,368
–	–	–	–	–	–	–	110	1,005
–	–	–	–	–	–	–	158	652
–	–	–	–	–	–	–	152	708
–	–	–	–	–	–	–	120	819
–	–	–	–	–	–	–	147	1,188
–	–	–	–	–	–	–	–	–
–	–	–	–	–	–	–	175	368
–	–	–	–	–	–	–	189	316
–	–	–	–	–	–	–	–	–
–	–	–	–	–	–	–	–	–
–	–	–	–	–	–	–	197	330

Total Sales: 42,035

== TV performances ==
- 2007-10-28: Haromoni@
- 2007-11-02: Music Japan
