= Co-no-Mi-chi =

Single by Buono!

from the album Buono!2
- B-side: "Muteki no Power!"
- Released: January 21, 2009; February 4, 2009 (Single V)
- Genre: J-pop
- Label: Pony Canyon
- Composer: Tsunku
- Lyricist: Yoshiko Miura
- Producer: Tsunku

Buono! singles chronology
"Rottara Rottara" (2008)	"Co-no-Mi-chi" (2009)	"MY BOY" (2009)

Music video
- "Co-no-Mi-chi" on YouTube

"Co-no-Mi-chi" (co·no·mi·chi, Kono Michi; lit. This Road) is the title of the sixth single by the Hello! Project unit Buono!. The title song is the second song used for the ending theme of Shugo Chara!! Doki—.

The single was released on January 21, 2009 in Japan under the Pony Canyon label in two different versions: regular and limited.

The Single V version was released on February 4, 2009 titled Single V "Co-no-Mi-chi" (シングルV「co·no·mi·chi」).

== Track listing ==
=== CD ===
1. "co•no•mi•chi" (co·no·mi·chi, Kono Michi; lit. This Road)
2. "Muteki no Mugendai Power" (無敵の∞Power)
3. "co•no•mi•chi (Instrumental)"
4. "Muteki no Mugendai Power (Instrumental)"

=== Single V DVD ===
1. "co•no•mi•chi <Music Clip>"
2. "co•no•mi•chi <Close Up Version>"
3. "co•no•mi•chi <Dance Shot Version>"
4. "Making of PV" (PV撮影メイキング)

== Oricon rank and sales ==
Year	Peak Position		Sales
Year	Daily	Weekly	Sales
2009	3	4	21,298

== Television performances ==
- Music Japan (January 22, 2009)
- Music Fighter (January 23, 2009)
