= Bravo Bravo =

Ninth single by Hello! Project unit Buono!

"Bravo☆Bravo"

Single by Buono!
- B-side: "-Winter Story-"
- Released: 16 December 2009
- Genre: J-pop, Pop rock
- Length: 15:08
- Label: Pony Canyon
- Songwriters: Yoshiko Miura, Tsunku, Susumu Nishikawa, Natsuki Kawakami, Akirastar, Shinjirō Inoue
- Producer: Tsunku

Buono! singles chronology
"My Boy" (2009)	"Bravo☆Bravo" (2009)	"Our Songs" (2010)

Bravo☆Bravo (stylized as "Bravo☆Bravo") is the title of the ninth single by Hello! Project unit Buono!. The title song is the first song used for the ending theme of the anime Shugo Chara Party!, and the ninth of the entire series. The single was released on 16 December 2009, in Japan under the Pony Canyon label in two different versions: regular and limited.

== Release and formats ==
The limited edition came with a serial number card, used in a promotional draw, a special DVD and a Buono! trading card, as well as having an alternative cover. The DVD contains footage of the "making of" the jacket photography for the single. The first press of both editions came with a photocard. The Single V was released on 22 December 2009.

== Chart performance ==
The single peaked at number 4 on the weekly Oricon charts, selling 18,086 copies in its first week.

== Live performances ==
To commemorate the group's first live tour, copies of the CD were sold during their performance at Tokyo Kōsei Nenkin Kaikan, and all buyers were entered into a lottery to win an autographed poster, presented to them by the girls.

== Track listing ==
=== CD ===
No.	Title	Lyrics	Music	Length
1.	"Bravo☆Bravo"	Yoshiko Miura	Tsunku, Susumu Nishikawa	3:53
2.	"-Winter Story-"	Natsuki Kawakami	Akirastar, Shinjirō Inoue	3:43
3.	"Bravo☆Bravo (Instrumental)"			3:52
4.	"-Winter Story- (Instrumental)"			3:40
Total length:				15:08

=== Limited Edition DVD ===
No.	Title	Length
1.	"Jacket Photography: Making Of" (ジャケット撮影メイキング (Jacket Satsuei Making))
