= Take It Easy! =

"Take it Easy!"

Single by Buono!
- B-side: "Kirai Suki Dai Kirai"
- Released: August 26, 2009
- Genre: J-pop
- Label: Pony Canyon
- Composer: Tsunku
- Lyricist: Yoshiko Miura
- Producer: Tsunku

Buono! singles chronology
"MY BOY" (2009)	"Take it Easy!" (2009)	"Bravo☆Bravo" (2009)

Music video
- Take It Easy! on YouTube

"Take It Easy!" is the title of the eighth single by the Hello! Project unit Buono!. The title song is the fourth song used for the ending theme of Shugo Chara!! Doki—.

The single was released on August 26, 2009 in Japan under the Pony Canyon label in two different versions: regular and limited.

The Single V version was released on September 2, 2009

== Track listing ==
=== CD ===
1. "Take It Easy!"
2. "Kirai Suki Dai Kirai" (キライスキダイキライ, Hate, Like, Really Hate)
3. "Take It Easy! (Instrumental)"
4. "Kirai Suki Dai Kirai (Instrumental)"

=== Single V DVD ===
1. "Take It Easy! <Music Clip>"
2. "Take It Easy! <Close Up Version>"
3. "Take It Easy! <Dance Shot Version>"
4. "Making of PV" (PV撮影メイキング)
