= My Boy (Buono! song) =

Single by Buono!
- B-side: "Warp"
- Released: April 29, 2009; May 13, 2009 (Single V)
- Genre: J-pop
- Label: Pony Canyon
- Composer: Tsunku
- Lyricist: Yoshiko Miura
- Producer: Tsunku

Buono! singles chronology
"Co-no-Mi-chi" (2009)	"My Boy" (2009)	"Take It Easy!" (2009)

Music video
- My Boy on YouTube

"My Boy" (stylized in all caps) is the title of the seventh single by the Hello! Project unit Buono!. The title song is the third song used for the ending theme of Shugo Chara!! Doki—.

The single was released on April 29, 2009 in Japan under the Pony Canyon label in two different versions: regular and limited.

The Single V version was released on May 13, 2009

== Track listing ==
=== CD ===
1. "My Boy"
2. "Warp"
3. "My Boy"(Instrumental)
4. "Warp" (Instrumental)

=== Single V DVD ===
1. "My Boy" <Music Clip>
2. "My Boy" <Close Up Version>
3. "My Boy" <Dance Shot Version>
4. "Making of PV" (PV撮影メイキング)
