= Please Miniskirt Postwoman! =

Single by S/mileage

from the album S/mileage Best Album Kanzenban 1
- A-side: "Please Miniskirt Postwoman!"
- B-side: "Te o Nigitte Arukitai" (Regular Ed.); "Konnichiwa Konbanwa" (Lim. Ed. A, B, C); "S/mileage Singles Gekiyaba Remix" (Lim. Ed. D)
- Released: December 28, 2011 (Japan)
- Genre: J-pop
- Label: Hachama
- Songwriter: Tsunku
- Producer: Tsunku

S/mileage singles chronology
"Tachiagirl" (2011)	"Please Miniskirt Postwoman!" (2011)	"Choto Mate Kudasai!" (2012)

Hello! Project Mobekimasu singles chronology
"Busu ni Naranai Tetsugaku" (2011)

Music video
- "Please Miniskirt Postwoman!" on YouTube

Professional ratings
Review scores
Source	Rating
Hotexpress	Favorable

"Please Miniskirt Postwoman!" (プリーズ ミニスカ ポストウーマン！, Purīzu Minisuka Posuto Ūman) is the 8th major single by the Japanese girl idol group S/mileage. It was released in Japan on December 28, 2011, on the label Hachama.

The physical CD single debuted at number 4 in the Oricon daily singles chart.

In the Oricon weekly chart, it debuted at number five.

== B-sides ==
The B-side of the regular edition is a cover of the song "Te o Nigitte Arukitai" by Maki Gotō. She released it as a single in 2002.

== Release ==
The single was released in five versions: four limited editions (Limited Editions A, B, C, and D) and a regular edition.

All the limited editions came with a sealed-in serial-numbered entry card for the lottery to win a ticket to one of the single's launch events.

The corresponding DVD single (so called Single V) was released 2 weeks later, on January 11, 2012.

== Personnel ==
S/mileage members:

- Ayaka Wada
- Yūka Maeda
- Kanon Fukuda
- Kana Nakanishi
- Akari Takeuchi
- Rina Katsuta
- Meimi Tamura

== Track listing ==
=== Regular Edition ===
All tracks are written by Tsunku.

CD
No.	Title	Length
1.	"Please Miniskirt Postwoman!" (プリーズ ミニスカ ポストウーマン！)
2.	"Te o Nigitte Arukitai" (手を握って歩きたい)
3.	"Please Miniskirt Postwoman! (Instrumental)"

=== Limited Editions A, B, C ===
All tracks are written by Tsunku.

CD
No.	Title	Length
1.	"Please Miniskirt Postwoman!"
2.	"Konnichiwa Konbanwa" (こんにちは こんばんは)
3.	"Please Miniskirt Postwoman! (Instrumental)"

Limited Edition A DVD
No.	Title	Length
1.	"Please Miniskirt Postwoman! (Dance Shot Ver.)"

Limited Edition B DVD
No.	Title	Length
1.	"Please Miniskirt Postwoman! (Warugaki Ver.)"

Limited Edition C DVD
No.	Title	Length
1.	"Please Miniskirt Postwoman! (Dance Shot Ver. II)"

=== Limited Edition D ===
All tracks are written by Tsunku.

CD
No.	Title	Length
1.	"Please Miniskirt Postwoman!"
2.	"S/mileage Singles Gekiyaba Remix" (スマイレージ シングルス 激ヤバリミックス)
3.	"Please Miniskirt Postwoman! (Instrumental)"

== Charts ==
Chart (2011–2012)	Peak position
Japan (Oricon Daily Singles Chart)	4
Japan (Oricon Weekly Singles Chart)	5
Japan (Billboard Japan Hot 100)	70
Japan (Billboard Japan Hot Singles Sales)	50
Japan (Billboard Japan Hot Top Airplay)	69
