= Tachiagirl =

Single by S/mileage

from the album S/mileage Best Album Kanzenban 1
- A-side: "Tachiagirl"
- B-side: "Smile Ondon" (Reg. Ed., Lim. Ed. A, B); "Boogie Train '11" (Lim. Ed. C); "S/mileage Singles Gekijō Moe Remix" (Lim. Ed. D)
- Released: September 28, 2011 (Japan)
- Genre: J-pop
- Label: Hachama
- Songwriter: Tsunku
- Producer: Tsunku

S/mileage singles chronology
"Uchōten Love" (2011)	"Tachiagirl" (2011)	"Please Miniskirt Postwoman!" (2011)

Hello! Project Mobekimasu singles chronology
"Busu ni Naranai Tetsugaku" (2011)

Music video
- "Tachiagirl" on YouTube

"Tachiagirl" (タチアガール, Tachiagāru) is the 7th major single by the Japanese girl idol group S/mileage. It was released in Japan on September 28, 2011, on the label Hachama.

The physical CD single debuted at number 3 in the Oricon daily singles chart.

In the Oricon weekly chart, it debuted at number 4.

== B-sides ==
The B-side of the Limited Edition C is a cover of the song "Boogie Train '03" by Miki Fujimoto. She released it as a single in 2003.

== Release ==
The single was released in five versions: four limited editions (Limited Editions A, B, C, and D) and a regular edition.

All the limited editions came with a sealed-in serial-numbered entry card for the lottery to win a ticket to one of the single's launch events.

The corresponding DVD single (so called Single V) was released 2 weeks later, on October 12, 2011.

== Personnel ==
S/mileage members:

- Ayaka Wada
- Yūka Maeda
- Kanon Fukuda
- Kana Nakanishi
- Fuyuka Kosuga
- Akari Takeuchi
- Rina Katsuta
- Meimi Tamura

== Track listing ==
=== Regular Edition, Limited Editions A, B ===
All tracks are written by Tsunku.

CD
No.	Title	Length
1.	"Tachiagirl" (タチアガール)
2.	"Smile Ondon" (スマイル音丼)
3.	"Tachiagirl (Instrumental)"

Limited Edition A DVD
No.	Title	Length
1.	"Tachiagirl (Dance Shot Ver.)"

Limited Edition B DVD
No.	Title	Length
1.	"Tachiagirl (Warugaki Ver.)"

=== Limited Edition C ===
All tracks are written by Tsunku.

CD
No.	Title	Length
1.	"Tachiagirl"
2.	"Boogie Train '11" (ブギートレイン'11)
3.	"Tachiagirl (Instrumental)"

=== Limited Edition D ===
All tracks are written by Tsunku.

CD
No.	Title	Length
1.	"Tachiagirl"
2.	"S/mileage Singles Gekijō Moe Remix" (スマイレージ シングルス 激萌えリミックス)
3.	"Tachiagirl (Instrumental)"

== Charts ==
Chart (2011)	Peak position
Japan (Oricon Daily Singles Chart)	3
Japan (Oricon Weekly Singles Chart)	4
Japan (Oricon Monthly Singles Chart)	20
Japan (Billboard Japan Hot 100)	17
Japan (Billboard Japan Hot Singles Sales)	4
Japan (Billboard Japan Hot Top Airplay)	76
Japan (Billboard Japan Adult Contemporary Airplay)	70
