= Dot Bikini =

Single by S/mileage

from the album S/mileage Best Album Kanzenban 1
- A-side: "Dot Bikini"
- B-side: "Smile Blues" (limited editions); "Koibito wa Kokoro no Ōendan" (Regular Ed.)
- Released: May 2, 2012 (Japan)
- Genre: J-pop
- Label: Hachama
- Songwriter: Tsunku
- Producer: Tsunku

S/mileage singles chronology
"Choto Mate Kudasai!" (2011)	"Dot Bikini" (2012)	"Suki yo, Junjō Hankōki" (2012)

Music video
- "Dot Bikini" on YouTube

"Dot Bikini" (ドットビキニ; "Polka Dot Bikini") is the 10th major single by the Japanese girl idol group S/mileage. It was released in Japan on May 2, 2012, on the label Hachama.

The physical CD single debuted at number 6 in the Oricon weekly singles chart.

== B-sides ==
The B-side of the regular edition is a cover of the 2001 song "Koibito wa Kokoro no Ōendan" by the group Country Musume that released it as a single in 2001.

== Release ==
The single was released in five versions: four limited editions (Limited Editions A, B, C, and D) and a regular edition.

All the limited editions came with a sealed-in serial-numbered entry card for the lottery to win a ticket to one of the single's launch events.

== Personnel ==
S/mileage members:

- Ayaka Wada
- Kanon Fukuda
- Kana Nakanishi
- Akari Takeuchi
- Rina Katsuta
- Meimi Tamura

== Track listing ==
=== Regular Edition ===
All tracks are written by Tsunku.

CD
No.	Title	Length
1.	"Dot Bikini" (ドットビキニ)
2.	"Koibito wa Kokoro no Ōendan" (恋人は心の応援団) (a cover version of a song by Country Musume)
3.	"Dot Bikini (Instrumental)"

=== Limited Editions A, B, C, D ===
All tracks are written by Tsunku.

CD
No.	Title	Length
1.	"Dot Bikini"
2.	"Smile Blues" (すまいるブルース)
3.	"Dot Bikini (Instrumental)"

Limited Edition A DVD
No.	Title	Length
1.	"Dot Bikini (Dance Shot Ver.)"

Limited Edition B DVD
No.	Title	Length
1.	"Dot Bikini (Minna Shugo Ver.)"

Limited Edition C DVD
No.	Title	Length
1.	"Dot Bikini (Dance Shot Ver. II)"

== Charts ==
Chart (2012)	Peak position
Japan (Oricon Daily Singles Chart)	4
Japan (Oricon Weekly Singles Chart)	6
Japan (Billboard Japan Hot 100)	46
