= Choto Mate Kudasai! =

Single by S/mileage

from the album S/mileage Best Album Kanzenban 1
- A-side: "Choto Mate Kudasai!"
- B-side: "Namida Girl" (Regular Ed.); "Chance Tōrai!" (Lim. Ed. A, B, C); "S/mileage Singles Gekiatsu Remix" (Lim. Ed. D)
- Released: February 1, 2012 (Japan)
- Genre: J-pop
- Label: Hachama
- Songwriter: Tsunku
- Producer: Tsunku

S/mileage singles chronology
"Please Miniskirt Postwoman!" (2011)	"Choto Mate Kudasai!" (2012)	"Dot Bikini" (2012)

Music video
- "Choto Mate Kudasai!" on YouTube

Professional ratings
Review scores
Source	Rating
Hotexpress / Billboard Japan	Favorable

"Choto Mate Kudasai!" (チョトマテクダサイ！; "Wait a little bit, please!") is the 9th major single by the Japanese girl idol group S/mileage. It was released in Japan on February 1, 2012 on the label Hachama.

The physical CD single debuted at number 2 in the Oricon daily singles chart.

In the Oricon weekly chart, it debuted at number six.

== B-sides ==
The B-side of the regular edition is a cover of the song "Namida Girl" by Miki Fujimoto (from her 2003 album Miki 1).

== Release ==
The single was released in five versions: four limited editions (Limited Editions A, B, C, and D) and a regular edition.

All the limited editions came with a sealed-in serial-numbered entry card for the lottery to win a ticket to one of the single's launch events.

The corresponding DVD single (so called Single V) was released a week later, on February 8.

== Personnel ==
S/mileage members:

- Ayaka Wada
- Kanon Fukuda
- Kana Nakanishi
- Akari Takeuchi
- Rina Katsuta
- Meimi Tamura

== Track listing ==
=== Regular Edition ===
All tracks are written by Tsunku.

CD
No.	Title	Length
1.	"Choto Mate Kudasai!" (チョトマテクダサイ！)
2.	"Namida Girl" (涙 GIRL)
3.	"Choto Mate Kudasai! (Instrumental)"

=== Limited Editions A, B, C ===
All tracks are written by Tsunku.

CD
No.	Title	Length
1.	"Choto Mate Kudasai!"
2.	"Chance Tōrai!" (チャンス到来！)
3.	"Choto Mate Kudasai! (Instrumental)"

Limited Edition A DVD
No.	Title	Length
1.	"Choto Mate Kudasai! (Dance Shot Ver.)"

Limited Edition B DVD
No.	Title	Length
1.	"Choto Mate Kudasai! (Minna Shugo Ver.)"

Limited Edition C DVD
No.	Title	Length
1.	"Choto Mate Kudasai! (Dance Shot Ver. II)"

=== Limited Edition D ===
All tracks are written by Tsunku.

CD
No.	Title	Length
1.	"Choto Mate Kudasai!"
2.	"S/mileage Singles Gekiatsu Remix" (スマイレージ シングルス 激アツリミックス)
3.	"Choto Mate Kudasai! (Instrumental)"

== Charts ==
Chart (2012)	Peak position
Japan (Oricon Daily Singles Chart)	2
Japan (Oricon Weekly Singles Chart)	6
Japan (Billboard Japan Hot 100)	28
Japan (Billboard Japan Hot Singles Sales)	8

== Variations ==
- Sam Kapu is the original performer of this song since 1971 in a relaxing music form and in English language.
- On December 1, 1971, it was made by a Girl Group named Golden Half as its cover version, leading to its revival.
- Around 1980s, Frances Yip made a revival to this song, which was part of her best album.
- On 2005, SexBomb Girls made a Filipino version of this song, as long as it retains the Japanese Title, and its English Phrases. It was also part of their 4th Album, Sumayaw Sumunod: The Best of SexBomb Girls as its 10th track.
