= Koi ni Booing Boo! =

Single by S/mileage

from the album S/mileage Best Album Kanzenban 1
- A-side: "Koi ni Booing Boo!"
- B-side: "Koi o Shichaimashita!" (reg. edition); "Hatsukoi no Anata e" (lim. editions A, B, C, D)
- Released: April 27, 2011 (Japan)
- Genre: J-pop
- Label: Hachama
- Songwriter: Tsunku
- Producer: Tsunku

S/mileage singles chronology
"Short Cut" (2011)	"Koi ni Booing Boo!" (2011)	"Uchōten Love" (2011)

Music video
- "Koi ni Booing Boo!" on YouTube

"Koi ni Booing Boo!" (恋にBooing ブー！) is the 5th major single by the Japanese girl idol group S/mileage. It was released in Japan on April 27, 2011 on the label Hachama.

The physical CD single debuted at number 6 in the Oricon daily singles chart.

In the Oricon weekly chart, it debuted also at number 6.

== B-sides ==
The B-side of the regular edition was a cover of the song "Koi o Shichaimashita!" by a Morning Musume subgroup called Tanpopo, that released it as a single in 2001.

== Release ==
The single was released in five versions: four limited editions (Limited Editions A, B, C, and D) and a regular edition.

All the limited editions came with a sealed-in serial-numbered entry card for the lottery to win a ticket to one of the single's launch events.

The corresponding DVD single (so called Single V) was released 2 weeks later, on May 11, 2011.

== Personnel ==
S/mileage members:

- Ayaka Wada
- Yūka Maeda
- Kanon Fukuda
- Saki Ogawa

== Track listing ==
=== Regular Edition ===
All tracks are written by Tsunku.

CD
No.	Title	Length
1.	"Koi ni Booing Boo!" (恋にBooing ブー！)
2.	"Koi o Shichaimashita!" (恋をしちゃいました！)
3.	"Koi ni Booing Boo! (Instrumental)"

=== Limited Editions A, B, C, D ===
All tracks are written by Tsunku.

CD
No.	Title	Length
1.	"Koi ni Booing Boo!"
2.	"Hatsukoi no Anata e" (初恋の貴方へ)
3.	"Koi ni Booing Boo! (Instrumental)"

Limited Edition A DVD
No.	Title	Length
1.	"Koi ni Booing Boo! (Dance Shot Ver.)"

Limited Edition B DVD
No.	Title	Length
1.	"Koi ni Booing Boo! (Boo Ver.)"

Limited Edition C DVD
No.	Title	Length
1.	"Koi ni Booing Boo! (Black Ver.)"

== Charts ==
Chart (2011)	Peak position
Japan (Oricon Daily Singles Chart)	5
Japan (Oricon Weekly Singles Chart)	6
Japan (Oricon Monthly Singles Chart)	20
Japan (Billboard Japan Hot 100)	20
