= Uchōten Love =

Single by S/mileage

from the album S/mileage Best Album Kanzenban 1
- A-side: "Uchōten Love"
- B-side: "Chu! Natsu Party" (reg. edition); "Jitensha Chiririn" (lim. editions A, B, C, D)
- Released: August 3, 2011 (Japan)
- Genre: J-pop
- Label: Hachama
- Songwriter: Tsunku
- Producer: Tsunku

S/mileage singles chronology
"Koi ni Booing Boo!" (2011)	"Uchōten Love" (2011)	"Tachiagirl" (2011)

Music video
- "Uchōten Love" on YouTube

"Uchōten Love" (有頂天LOVE, Uchōten Rabu) is the 6th major single by the Japanese girl idol group S/mileage. It was released in Japan on August 3, 2011 on the label Hachama.

The physical CD single debuted at number 4 in the Oricon daily singles chart.

In the Oricon weekly chart, it debuted at number 5.

== B-sides ==
The B-side of the regular edition was a cover of the song "Chu! Natsu Party", originally released as a single by a temporary Hello! Project group 3nin Matsuri. By that time it had already been covered by Berryz Kobo on their 2006 mini album 3 Natsu Natsu Mini Berryz.

== Release ==
The single was released in five versions: four limited editions (Limited Editions A, B, C, and D) and a regular edition.

All the limited editions came with a sealed-in serial-numbered entry card for the lottery to win a ticket to one of the single's launch events.

The corresponding DVD single (so called Single V) was released 1 week later, on August 10, 2011.

== Personnel ==
S/mileage members:

- Ayaka Wada
- Yūka Maeda
- Kanon Fukuda
- Saki Ogawa

== Track listing ==
=== Regular Edition ===
All tracks are written by Tsunku.

CD
No.	Title	Length
1.	"Uchōten Love" (有頂天LOVE)
2.	"Chu! Natsu Party" (チュ！夏パ～ティ)
3.	"Uchōten Love (Instrumental)"

=== Limited Editions A, B, C, D ===
All tracks are written by Tsunku.

CD
No.	Title	Length
1.	"Uchōten Love"
2.	"Jitensha Chiririn" (ブギートレイン'11)
3.	"Uchōten Love (Instrumental)"

Limited Edition A DVD
No.	Title	Length
1.	"Uchōten Love (Dance Shot Ver.)"

Limited Edition B DVD
No.	Title	Length
1.	"Uchōten Love (4Shot Lip Ver.)"

Limited Edition C DVD
No.	Title	Length
1.	"Uchōten Love (School Chorus Ver.)"

== Charts ==
Chart (2011)	Peak position
Japan (Oricon Daily Singles Chart)	4
Japan (Oricon Weekly Singles Chart)	5
Japan (Oricon Monthly Singles Chart)	20
Japan (Billboard Japan Hot 100)	20
Japan (Billboard Japan Hot Singles Sales)	7
Japan (Billboard Japan Hot Animation)	5
