= Short Cut (song) =

Single by S/mileage

from the album S/mileage Best Album Kanzenban 1
- A-side: "Short Cut"
- B-side: "Otome Pasta ni Kandō" (reg. edition); "Panya San no Arubaito" (lim. editions A, B, C, D)
- Released: February 9, 2011 (Japan)
- Genre: J-pop
- Label: Hachama
- Songwriter: Tsunku
- Producer: Tsunku

S/mileage singles chronology
"Onaji Jikyū de Hataraku Tomodachi no Bijin Mama" (2010)	"Short Cut" (2011)	"Koi ni Booing Boo!" (2011)

Lilpri singles chronology
"Idolulu" (2010)

Ohagirl Maple with S/mileage singles chronology
"My School March" (2010)

Music video
- "Short Cut" on YouTube

"Short Cut" (ショートカット, Shōtokatto; "Short Haircut") is the 4th major single by the Japanese girl idol group S/mileage. It was released in Japan on February 9, 2011 on the label Hachama.

The physical CD single debuted at number 6 in the Oricon daily singles chart.

In the Oricon weekly chart, it debuted at number 5.

== B-sides ==
The B-side of the regular edition was a cover of the song "Otome Pasta ni Kandō" by a Morning Musume subgroup called Tanpopo that released it as a single in 2000.

== Release ==
The single was released in five versions: four limited editions (Limited Editions A, B, C, and D) and a regular edition.

All the limited editions came with a sealed-in serial-numbered entry card for the lottery to win a ticket to one of the single's launch events.

== Personnel ==
S/mileage members:

- Ayaka Wada
- Yūka Maeda
- Kanon Fukuda
- Saki Ogawa

== Track listing ==
=== Regular Edition ===
All tracks are written by Tsunku.

CD
No.	Title	Length
1.	"Short Cut" (ショートカット)
2.	"Otome Pasta ni Kandō" (乙女パスタに感動)
3.	"Short Cut (Instrumental)"

=== Limited Editions A, B, C, D ===
All tracks are written by Tsunku.

CD
No.	Title	Length
1.	"Short Cut"
2.	"Panya San no Arubaito" (パン屋さんのアルバイト)
3.	"Short Cut (Instrumental)"

Limited Edition A DVD
No.	Title	Length
1.	"Short Cut (Dance Shot Ver.)"

Limited Edition B DVD
No.	Title	Length
1.	"Short Cut (Image Scene Ver.)"

Limited Edition C DVD
No.	Title	Length
1.	"Short Cut (Salon Dream Ver.)"

== Charts ==
Chart (2011)	Peak position
Japan (Oricon Daily Singles Chart)	4
Japan (Oricon Weekly Singles Chart)	5
Japan (Oricon Monthly Singles Chart)	21
Japan (Billboard Japan Hot 100)	9
Japan (Billboard Japan Hot Singles Sales)	4
Japan (Billboard Japan Hot Top Airplay)	16
