= Gambaranakute mo Ee nen de!! =

Single by S/mileage

from the album Warugaki 1
- A-side: "Gambara Nakute mo Ee nen de!!"
- B-side: "Gambara Nakute mo Ii n' Da yo!!" (in all editions)
- Released: July 28, 2010 (Japan)
- Genre: J-pop
- Label: Hachama
- Songwriter: Tsunku
- Producer: Tsunku

S/mileage singles chronology
"Yume Miru 15" (2010)	"Gambaranakute mo Ee nen de!!" (2010)	"Onaji Jikyū de Hataraku Tomodachi no Bijin Mama" (2010)

Lilpri singles chronology
"Little Princess Pri!" (2010)

Music video
- "Gambara Nakute mo Ee nen de!!" "Gambara Nakute mo Ii n' Da yo!!" on YouTube

"Gambaranakute mo Ee nen de!!" (○○ がんばらなくてもええねんで!!) is the 2nd major single by the Japanese girl idol group S/mileage. It was released in Japan on July 28, 2010 on the label Hachama.

The physical CD single debuted at number 5 in the Oricon daily singles chart.

In the Oricon weekly chart, it debuted at number 6.

== Release ==
The single was released in four versions: three limited editions (Limited Editions A, B, and C) and a regular edition.

All the limited editions and the first press of the regular edition came with a sealed-in serial-numbered entry card for the lottery to win a ticket to one of the single's launch events.

The corresponding DVD single (so called Single V) was released one week later, on August 4, 2010.

== Personnel ==
S/mileage members:

- Ayaka Wada
- Yūka Maeda
- Kanon Fukuda
- Saki Ogawa

== Track listing ==
=== Regular Edition ===
All tracks are written by Tsunku.

CD (same in all editions)
No.	Title	Length
1.	"Gambaranakute mo Ee nen de!!" (○○ がんばらなくてもええねんで!!)
2.	"Gambaranakute mo Ii n' Da yo!!" (○○ がんばらなくてもいいんだよ!!)
3.	"Smile Bijin" (スマイル美人)
4.	"Gambaranakute mo Ee nen de!! (Instrumental)"

Limited Edition A DVD
No.	Title	Length
1.	"Gambaranakute mo Ee nen de!! (Dance Shot Ver. Black)"

Limited Edition B DVD
No.	Title	Length
1.	"Gambaranakute mo Ee nen de!! (Dance Shot Ver. White)"

Limited Edition C DVD
No.	Title	Length
1.	"Gambaranakute mo Ee nen de!! (Close-up Ver.)"

== Charts ==
Chart (2011)	Peak position
Japan (Oricon Daily Singles Chart)	4
Japan (Oricon Weekly Singles Chart)	6
Japan (Oricon Monthly Singles Chart)	29
Japan (Billboard Japan Hot 100)	22
