= Warugaki 1 =

Studio album by S/mileage
- Released: December 8, 2010 (JP)
- Genre: J-pop; dance-pop; electropop
- Label: Hachama
- Producer: Tsunku

S/mileage chronology
Warugaki 1 (2010)	S/mileage Best Album Kanzenban 1 (2012)

Singles from Warugaki 1
- 1. "aManojaku" Released: June 6, 2009; 2. "Asu wa Date na no ni, Ima Sugu Koe ga Kikitai" Released: September 23, 2009; 3. "Suki-chan" Released: November 23, 2009; 4. "Otona ni Narutte Muzukashii!!!" Released: March 14, 2010; 5. "Yume Miru 15" Released: May 26, 2010; 6. "Gambaranakute mo Ee nen de!!" Released: July 28, 2010; 7. "Onaji Jikyū de Hataraku Tomodachi no Bijin Mama" Released: September 29, 2010

Warugaki 1 (悪ガキッ①, Warugaki Ichi) is the first studio album by Japanese girl idol group S/mileage. It was released on 8 December 2010 on the label Hachama.

== Release ==
The album was released in 2 versions: a Regular Edition and a Limited Edition. The limited edition contained an additional DVD.

The album contained 12 tracks on the CD: 7 songs that were originally released as A-sides of 7 physical singles and 5 new songs.

== Chart performance ==
The album debuted at number 18 in the Japanese Oricon weekly albums chart.

== Personnel ==
Members of S/mileage:

- Ayaka Wada
- Yūka Maeda
- Kanon Fukuda
- Saki Ogawa

== Track listing ==
All tracks are written by Tsunku

CD (same in all editions)
No.	Title	Length
1.	"Onaji Jikyū de Hataraku Tomodachi no Bijin Mama" (同じ時給で働く友達の美人ママ)
2.	"Odorō yo" (踊ろうよ)
3.	"Onna Bakari no Nichiyōbi" (女ばかりの日曜日)
4.	"Yume Miru Fifteen" (夢見る 15歳)
5.	"Shooting Star" (シューティングスター)
6.	"Gambaranakute mo Ee nen de!!" (○○ がんばらなくてもええねんで!!)
7.	"Suki-chan" (スキちゃん)
8.	"Gakkyū Iinchō" (学級委員長)
9.	"Shikkari Shite yo! Mō" (しっかりしてよ! もう)
10.	"Otona ni Narutte Muzukashii!!!" (オトナになるって難しい!!!)
11.	"Asu wa Date na no ni, Ima Sugu Koe ga Kikitai" (あすはデートなのに、今すぐ声が聞きたい)
12.	"aManojaku" (ぁまのじゃく)

DVD (comes with the Limited Edition only)
No.	Title	Length
1.	"Yume Miru Fifteen (Web Mix Ver.)" (夢見る15歳 (Web Mix Ver.))
2.	"Gambaranakute mo Ee nen de!! featuring Wada Ayaka Ver." (○○ がんばらなくてもええねんで!! featuring 和田彩花Ver.)
3.	"Gambaranakute mo Ee nen de!! featuring Maeda Yuuka Ver." (○○ がんばらなくてもええねんで!! featuring 前田憂佳Ver.)
4.	"Gambaranakute mo Ee nen de!! featuring Fukuda Kanon Ver." (○○ がんばらなくてもええねんで!! featuring 福田花音Ver.)
5.	"Gambaranakute mo Ee nen de!! featuring Ogawa Saki Ver." (○○ がんばらなくてもええねんで!! featuring 小川紗季Ver.)
6.	"Album Jacket Satsuei Making" (アルバムジャケット撮影メイキング)
7.	"(Tracks 7–24.) "Yume Miru 15" (TV-Spot AR Ver.) 18 Type" (「夢見る15歳」(TV-SPOT AR Ver.) 18TYPE)
25.	"S/mileage Twitter Kōza" (スマイレージ Twitter 講座)
26.	"Twitter Hashtag Kōza" (Twitterハッシュタグ講座)

The tracks 7–24 on the DVD were 18 different TV advertisements for S/mileage's first major-label single "Yume Miru 15".

== Charts ==
Chart (2010)	Peak position
Japan (Oricon Weekly Albums Chart)	18
