= S/mileage Best Album Kanzenban 1 =

Studio album by S/mileage
- Released: May 30, 2012 (JP)
- Genre: J-pop
- Label: Hachama
- Producer: Tsunku

S/mileage chronology
| Warugaki 1 (2010) | S/mileage Best Album Kanzenban 1 (2012) | 2 Smile Sensation (2013) |

Singles from S/mileage Best Album Kanzenban 1
- 1. "Short Cut" Released: February 9, 2011; 2. "Koi ni Booing Boo!" Released: April 27, 2011; 3. "Uchōten Love" Released: August 3, 2011; 4. "Tachiagirl" Released: September 28, 2011; 5. "Please Miniskirt Postwoman!" Released: December 28, 2011; 6. "Choto Mate Kudasai!" Released: February 1, 2012; 7. "Dot Bikini" Released: May 2, 2012

S/mileage Best Album Kanzenban 1 (スマイレージ ベストアルバム完全版①) is the first greatest hits album by Japanese girl idol group S/mileage. It was released on 30 May 2012 on the label Hachama.

== Release ==
The album was released in 2 versions: a regular edition and a limited edition. The limited edition contained an additional DVD.

The album contains 15 tracks on the CD: the first 14 tracks are, in reverse chronological order, 14 songs that were originally released on the A-sides of the group's first 14 singles (4 indie singles and 10 major-label singles), and the 15th track is a new song.

== Reception ==
The album debuted at number 13 in the Japanese Oricon weekly albums chart.

== Track listing ==
All tracks are written by Tsunku

CD (same in all editions)
| No. | Title | Notes | Length |
|---|---|---|---|
| 1. | "Dot Bikini" (ドットビキニ) | 14th single |
| 2. | "Choto Mate Kudasai!" (チョトマテクダサイ) | 13th single |
| 3. | "Please Miniskirt Post Woman" (プリーズ ミニスカ ポストウーマン!) | 12th single |
| 4. | "Tachiagirl" (タチアガール) | 11th single |
| 5. | "Uchōten Love" (有頂天LOVE) | 10th single |
| 6. | "Koi ni Booing Boo!" (恋にBooing ブー!) | 9th single |
| 7. | "Short Cut" (ショートカット) | 8th single |
| 8. | "Onaji Jikyū de Hataraku Tomodachi no Bijin Mama" (同じ時給で働く友達の美人ママ) | 7th single |
| 9. | "Gambaranakute mo Ee nen de!!" (○○ がんばらなくてもええねんで!!) | 6th single |
| 10. | "Yume Miru 15" (夢見る 15歳) | 5th single |
| 11. | "Otona ni Narutte Muzukashii!!!" (オトナになるって難しい!!!) | 4th single |
| 12. | "Suki-chan" (スキちゃん) | 3rd single |
| 13. | "Asu wa Date na no ni, Ima Sugu Koe ga Kikitai" (あすはデートなのに、今すぐ声が聞きたい) | 2nd single |
| 14. | "aManojaku" (ぁまのじゃく) | 1st single |
| 15. | "Kiiroi Jitensha to Sandwich" (黄色い自転車とサンドウィッチ) | New song |

DVD (comes with the Limited Edition only)
| No. | Title | Length |
|---|---|---|
| 1. | "S/mileage History" (スマイレージヒストリー) |

== Charts ==
| Chart (2012) | Peak position |
|---|---|
| Japan (Oricon Weekly Albums Chart) | 13 |
