= Onaji Jikyū de Hataraku Tomodachi no Bijin Mama =

Single by S/mileage

from the album Warugaki 1
- A-side: "Onaji Jikyū de Hataraku Tomodachi no Bijin Mama"
- B-side: "Chocotto Love" (in all editions)
- Released: September 29, 2010 (Japan)
- Genre: J-pop
- Label: Hachama
- Songwriter: Tsunku
- Producer: Tsunku

S/mileage singles chronology
"Gambaranakute mo Ee nen de!!" (2010)	"Onaji Jikyū de Hataraku Tomodachi no Bijin Mama" (2010)	"Short Cut" (2011)

Lilpri singles chronology
"Idolulu" (2010)

Ohagirl Maple with S/mileage singles chronology
"My School March" (2010)

Music video
- "Onaji Jikyū de Hataraku Tomodachi no Bijin Mama" on YouTube

"Onaji Jikyū de Hataraku Tomodachi no Bijin Mama" (同じ時給で働く友達の美人ママ) is the 3rd major single by the Japanese girl idol group S/mileage. It was released in Japan on September 29, 2010 on the label Hachama.

The physical CD single debuted at number 4 in the Oricon daily singles chart.

In the Oricon weekly chart, it debuted at number 5.

== B-sides ==
The B-side of the regular edition was a cover of the song "Chocotto Love" by a Morning Musume subgroup called Petit Moni that released it as a single in 1999.

== Release ==
The single was released in four versions: three limited editions (Limited Editions A, B, and C) and a regular edition.

All the limited editions and the first press of the regular edition came with a sealed-in serial-numbered entry card for the lottery to win a ticket to one of the single's launch events.

The corresponding DVD single (so called Single V) was released one week later, on October 6, 2010.

== Personnel ==
S/mileage members:

- Ayaka Wada
- Yūka Maeda
- Kanon Fukuda
- Saki Ogawa

== Track listing ==
=== Regular Edition ===
All tracks are written by Tsunku.

CD (same in all editions)
No.	Title	Length
1.	"Onaji Jikyū de Hataraku Tomodachi no Bijin Mama"
2.	"Chocotto Love" (ちょこっとLOVE)
3.	"Onaji Jikyū de Hataraku Tomodachi no Bijin Mama (Instrumental)"

Limited Edition A DVD
No.	Title	Length
1.	"Onaji Jikyū de Hataraku Tomodachi no Bijin Mama (Dance Shot Ver. Pink)"

Limited Edition B DVD
No.	Title	Length
1.	"Onaji Jikyū de Hataraku Tomodachi no Bijin Mama (Close-up Ver.)"

Limited Edition C DVD
No.	Title	Length
1.	"Onaji Jikyū de Hataraku Tomodachi no Bijin Mama (4 Shot Lip Ver.)"

== Charts ==
Chart (2011)	Peak position
Japan (Oricon Daily Singles Chart)	3
Japan (Oricon Weekly Singles Chart)	5
Japan (Oricon Monthly Singles Chart)	16
Japan (Billboard Japan Hot 100)	17
