= Shugo Chara! =

Japanese manga series

- Cover art of the first manga volume featuring Amu Hinamori

しゅごキャラ! (Shugo Kyara!)
- Genre: Magical girl
- Manga
- Written by: Peach-Pit
- Published by: Kodansha
- English publisher: NA: Del Rey Manga (former); Kodansha USA
- Magazine: Nakayoshi
- Original run: December 28, 2005 – September 2010
- Volumes: 12 (Note: Including Shugo Chara! Encore!)
- Anime television series
- Directed by: Kenji Yasuda
- Produced by: Tomoko Gujima; Aya Yoshino; Nao Yoshida; Shinsaku Hatta; Shinichi Nakamura
- Written by: Michiru Shimada
- Music by: Di'LL
- Studio: Satelight
- Licensed by: Crunchyroll
- Original network: TV Tokyo
- Original run: October 6, 2007 – September 27, 2008
- Episodes: 51
- Anime television series

Shugo Chara!! Doki—
- Directed by: Kenji Yasuda
- Produced by: Tomoko Gujima; Aya Yoshino; Nao Yoshida; Shinsaku Hatta; Takahiro Suzuki; Shinichi Nakamura
- Written by: Hiroshi Ōnogi
- Music by: Di'LL
- Studio: Satelight
- Licensed by: Crunchyroll
- Original network: TV Tokyo
- Original run: October 4, 2008 – September 26, 2009
- Episodes: 51
- Manga

Shugo Chara-chan!
- Written by: Mizushima Naftaren
- Published by: Kodansha
- English publisher: NA: Kodansha USA
- Magazine: Nakayoshi
- Original run: March 3, 2008 – December 1, 2010
- Volumes: 4
- Anime television series

Shugo Chara! Party!
- Directed by: Kenji Yasuda (chief); Tatsufumi Itō
- Produced by: Tomoko Gujima; Aya Yoshino; Nao Yoshida; Shinsaku Hatta; Shinichi Nakamura
- Written by: Hiroshi Ōnogi
- Music by: Di'LL
- Studio: Satelight
- Licensed by: Crunchyroll
- Original network: TV Tokyo
- Original run: October 3, 2009 – March 27, 2010
- Episodes: 25
- Manga

Shugo Chara! Jewel Joker
- Written by: Peach-Pit
- Published by: Kodansha
- English publisher: NA: Kodansha USA
- Magazine: Nakayoshi
- Original run: August 2, 2024 – present
- Volumes: 3

Shugo Chara! (Japanese: しゅごキャラ!, Hepburn: Shugo Kyara!), also known as My Guardian Characters, is a Japanese manga series written and illustrated by the manga author duo Peach-Pit. The story centers on elementary school girl Amu Hinamori, whose popular exterior, referred to as "cool and spicy" by her classmates, contrasts with her introverted personality. When Amu wishes for the courage to be reborn as her would-be self, she is surprised to find three colorful eggs the next morning, which hatch into three Guardian Characters: Ran, Miki, and Su.

Shugo Chara! was serialized in the magazine Nakayoshi and published by Kodansha in Japan. Del Rey has licensed the English language manga rights, releasing the first volume on March 27, 2007. It won the 2008 Kodansha Manga Award for best children's manga.

Shugo Chara! has also been adapted into a fifty-one episode anime television series of the same title produced by Satelight under the direction of Kenji Yasuda and debuted on October 6, 2007, on TV Tokyo. On July 20, 2008, Anime News Network reported that the Shugo Chara! anime would be continued for a second year under the title Shugo Chara!! Doki—, the first episode airing on October 10, 2008; the official anime website later announced an October 4, 2008, start date.

On October 3, 2009, Shugo Chara! began featuring another series. The new program, Shugo Chara Party! containing Shugo Chara!!! Dokki Doki and Shugo Chara Pucchi Puchi! follow the current anime series as its power-up. The last episode aired on March 26, 2010.

== Plot ==
The main protagonist of the story, Amu Hinamori, is a female student attending Seiyo Elementary. At first glance, her classmates refer to her attitude and appearance as "cool and spicy" and rumors speculate about her personal life. However, her real personality is that of a very shy girl who has trouble showing her true personality. One night, Amu wishes for the courage to show her "would-be" self, and the next morning, she finds three brightly colored eggs—pink, blue, and green—in her bed. These eggs hatch into three fairy-like guardians called "Shugo Charas" (Guardian Characters): Ran (pink), Miki (blue), and Su (green). The Guardian Characters aid Amu in discovering who she truly is and help fulfil Amu's dreams. Amu's life becomes much more complex, as she struggles to deal with her "would-be" selves and Seiyo Elementary's Guardians, who each have a Guardian Character of their own. People with Guardian Characters can "chara-nari" (character transform) or "character change". Each transformation has special powers, mainly for attacking or defending. Character changes have special powers too, but have more practical uses. Later on, they recruit Amu as the "Joker" to search for X Eggs and X Characters, the corrupted forms of people's dreams, so the Guardians can purify their dreams. In Japanese, the egg is shortened.

Meanwhile, the Easter Company is extracting people's eggs, in search of a special egg called the Embryo. The Embryo is believed to grant any wish to the one who possesses it. However, the process creates X Eggs and X Characters.

Later on in the series, a fourth (yellow) egg named Diamond is born. Unlike Amu's other Guardian Characters, she is only seen a few times in the series. Due to Amu's mixed feelings before Diamond was born, she becomes an X character and is "stolen" by idol singer Hoshina Utau, who uses Diamond to character change for her concerts, planned by Easter as part of their plan to get the Embryo. Later on, Diamond is purified and becomes a regular Guardian Character. She would then appear in times of heavy crisis.

== Media ==
=== Manga ===
In December 2005, Peach Pit announced that they were working on a new shōjo manga series called Shugo Chara! The first chapter was published in the February 2006 edition of Nakayoshi magazine. The first volume collection was then republished on July 6, 2006, by Nakayoshi publisher Kodansha. In addition to the regular volumes, the series was released in limited editions in Japan, each of which included different cover art from the regular editions, metallic foil sleeves, and a set of postcards featuring Amu in various outfits and poses following the color theme of the dust jackets. Del Rey Manga announced that it acquired the English language rights to Shugo Chara! during MangaNEXT 2006 and released the first volume on March 27, 2007. Kodansha USA published the entire series in 2011.

The series was put on hiatus along with two other series, Rozen Maiden and Zombie-Loan, in December 2008 due to a sudden illness and hospitalization of one of the authors. One month later, Peach-Pit announced that all three series will resume and thanked their fans for the support during the illness.

There is a four-volume spin-off manga series called Shugo Chara Chan!, featuring drawings by Mizushima Naftaren, which is in yonkoma (4-panel) comics style and focuses on Amu's guardians. There is no special edition version of the spin-off series.

The January issue of Kodansha's Nakayoshi magazine confirmed on December 1, 2009, that Peach-Pit would be ending the Shugo Chara! manga in the next issue on December 28. A sequel series was later announced, titled Shugo Chara! Encore!, and ran between April and September 2010 issues of Nakayoshi.

A sequel manga, titled Shugo Chara! Jewel Joker, began serialization in Nakayoshi on August 2, 2024.

=== Anime ===
Shugo Chara! was adapted into an anime television series of the same title in 2007. The television series is produced by Satelight under the direction of Kenji Yasuda and was first broadcast on the Japanese network, TV Tokyo. Consisting of fifty-one episodes, the first episode, "A Guardian Character is Born!" (しゅごキャラ誕生!, Shugo Kyara Tanjō!), aired on October 6, 2007. The episodes were rebroadcast by five other networks within a few days after the initial broadcast on TV Tokyo.

Six pieces of theme music by the J-pop group Buono! are used for the first season—two opening themes and four closing themes. The opening theme for the first twenty-six episodes is "Kokoro no Tamago" (こころのたまご; lit. 'Egg of the Heart'); and the last twenty-five episodes, "Minna Daisuki" (みんなだいすき, lit. 'I Love Everyone'). The closing theme for the first twelve episodes is "Honto no Jibun" (ホントのじぶん; lit. 'True Self'); episodes thirteen to twenty-six, "Ren'ai Rider" (恋愛 ライダー, Ren'ai Raidā; lit. 'Love Rider'); episodes twenty-seven to thirty-nine, "Kiss! Kiss! Kiss!"; and the last twelve episodes, "Gachinko de Ikō!" (ガチンコでいこう!; lit. 'Compete And Go!'). There are also four insert songs, all sung by Nana Mizuki: "Meikyū Butterfly", first sung in episode 12; "Black Diamond", first in episode 39; "Heartful Song", first in episode 47; and "Taiyou ga Niau yo", first in episode 93.

A second year of episodes, under the title Shugo Chara!! Doki— (しゅごキャラ!!どきっ), began airing the week after the fifty-first episode, on October 4, 2008; previously, Anime News Network reported that it was scheduled for October 10, 2008, on AT-X. Two opening themes sung by Shugo Chara Egg! and another two by Guardians 4 have been used; the opening theme for the first twelve episodes is "Minna no Tamago" (みんなのたまご; lit. 'Everyone's Egg'); the second is "Shugo Shugo!" (しゅごしゅご!; lit. 'Guardian Guardian!'), used in episodes sixty-five to episode seventy-six; and the third opening is "Omakase♪Guardian" (おまかせ♪がーデイアン; lit. 'Leave it to the♪Guardians'), by Guardians 4. The fourth and final opening is "School Days" sung by Guardians 4. The ending theme is "Rottara Rottara" (ロッタラ ロッタラ; lit. 'Lotta Love Lotta Love') by Buono!. A second ending theme, "Co-no-Mi-chi" (co·no·mi·chi; lit. 'This Road'), also by Buono!, took its place from episode 69 to 76. The third ending, "MY BOY", also sung by Buono!, started showing from episode 77 to 89. The fourth ending theme is called "Take it Easy!", also sung by Buono!, took its place from episode 90 and onwards. The opening theme for the Shugo Chara!!! Dokki Doki segment is "Watashi no Tamago" (My Egg) performed by Shugo Chara! Egg, while the opening for Shugo Chara! Party itself is "Party Time!" by Guardians 4. The first ending is "Bravo! Bravo!" performed by Buono!.

Crunchyroll announced on November 19, 2008, that it would be streaming Shugo Chara! with English subtitles along with other anime series from TV Tokyo.

On August 25, 2009, Anime News Network reported that a new series would premiere in Japan on October 3, 2009. This series is titled Shugo Chara Party! featuring anime and live-action segments and contains the anime Shugo Chara!!! Dokki Doki, the "power-up" of the Shugo Chara!! Doki— anime as its main segment and Shugo Chara Pucchi Puchi!, anime shorts starring Ran, Miki, Su, and Diamond. Director Kenji Yasuda continued to oversee both Shugo Chara!!! Dokki Doki and Shugo Chara Pucchi Puchi!.

=== Musical ===
A musical theatre adaptation of Shugo Chara! set to run from August 13 to August 23 was announced in January 2009, with all members of Shugo Chara Egg! appearing in the play. On May 1, 2009, news reports revealed Yuuka Maeda in the lead role as Amu, Kanon Fukuda as Nadeshiko, and Akari Saho and Ayaka Wada as part of the ensemble cast. Other cast members for the musical included Hidemi Hikita as Tadase, Meimi Tamura as Yaya, Yuta Koseki as Kukai, Karin Yagishita as Rima, Reo Sawada as Kairi, KENN as Ikuto, and Misaki Yonemura as Utau. Shortly after the announcement, Hello! Project stated that Maeda, Fukuda, and Wada were withdrawing from Shugo Chara Egg! after the musical to debut in Smileage. The DVD for the musical was released on October 23, 2009.

== Merchandising ==
=== Video games ===
Konami has released three video games, based on the manga, for the Nintendo DS. The first, titled Shugo Chara! Three Eggs and the Joker in Love! (しゅごキャラ!3つのたまごと恋するジョーカー, Shugo Kyara! Mittsu no Tamago to Koisuru Jyōkā), was released in Japan on March 13, 2008. It follows Amu's adventures as she purifies X Eggs, as well as pursuing any of the love interests available (Ikuto, Tadase, Kairi, Nikaidou and Nagihiko). The second game, titled Shugo Chara! Amu's Rainbow-Colored Character Change! (しゅごキャラ!あむのにじいろキャラチェンジ, Shugo Kyara! Amu no Nijiiro Kyara Chenji), was released in Japan on November 6, 2008. It is a raising sim where Amu must develop her relationship with any of the available characters (the Guardians, Ikuto, Utau, Nikaidou and Nagihiko) during three months, with the target of bringing a partner to the "Best Friends Festival". Two songs from the game, "Nijiiro Chara Change!" (にじいろキャラチェンジ!, Nijiiro Kyara Chenji!; lit. 'Rainbow Colored Character Change') and "Saikyō Love Power" (最強LOVE POWER; lit. 'Greatest Love Power'), were released as a CD single on November 5, 2008. The third game, titled Shugo Chara! Norinori! Chara Na-rhythm♪ (しゅごキャラ！ ノリノリ！キャラなりズム♪, Shugo Chara! Norinori! Chara-Narizumu), was released in Japan on August 6, 2009. It is a rhythm game that features all the main characters' image songs, as well as giving minor character Yua more exposure.

== Reception ==
The Shugo Chara! manga has received positive reviews from English language critics. Phil Theobald, writing for Newtype USA, states that while the premise may be fairly complicated, "the clean art and solid storytelling by Peach-Pit make it easy to follow." Thobald goes on to say that Shugo Chara! is "an interesting and humorous spin on the classic 'magical girl' genre."

Carlo Santos, writing for Anime News Network, states, "The best thing since Sugar Sugar Rune? Maybe not ... but it's damn close." In a later review, Santos compares Shugo Chara! to Cardcaptor Sakura and Sailor Moon, adding, "it addresses the complexities of the human psyche, from joke characters like the fortune-teller who doesn't trust her own abilities, to Nikaidou's own personal conflict over his childhood dreams."

Along with the positive reviews, Shugo Chara! was awarded the 2008 Kodansha Manga Award for best children's manga. The anime adaptation became one of the 10 most watched anime programs during the week of April 7–13, 2008, when its April 12 broadcast received an average household viewership rating of 4.2%. It later returned to the top 10 during the week of July 21–27, 2008, when its July 26 broadcast received an average rating of 4.1%.

The series was listed as being the 4th best-selling shojo manga property and the 14th best overall manga property in America for the first quarter of 2009. Jason Thompson felt that the manga focused on self-esteem, and that the artist's drawing skills carried the work.
