= Yume Miru 15 =

- Normal edition cover

Single by S/mileage

from the album Warugaki 1
- B-side: "Thank You! Crème Brûlée no Yuujō"
- Released: May 26, 2010
- Recorded: 2010
- Genre: J-pop
- Length: 11:15
- Label: Hachama
- Songwriters: Tsunku; Airin
- Producer: Tsunku

S/mileage singles chronology
"Otona ni Naru tte Muzukashii!!!" (2010)	"Yume Miru 15" (2010)	"Gambaranakute mo Ee nen de!!" (2010)

Lilpri singles chronology
""Little Princess Pri!"" (2010)

Music video
- Yume Miru 15 on YouTube

Yume Miru 15 (夢見る 15歳, Yume Miru Fifutīn; "Dreaming 15-Year-Old") is the official debut and first major-label single by Hello! Project idol group S/mileage, and their fifth single overall. The single was released on the Zetima Records label on 26 May 2010, distributed by Pony Canyon, after the group completed the "Smile Campaign" which allowed them to make their major debut. It was released in three editions: a normal edition, and two limited edition versions both containing DVDs. All editions sport different jackets. The limited edition versions, as well as the first press of the normal edition, contained a serial number card, which buyers could use to enter a lottery for tickets to the single's release event. Limited quantities of trading cards were also released with the single, and each type was only available at a certain music shop. An A3 poster featuring the cover of the Limited Edition A version was also available for purchase at some shops. The Single V was released on 2 June.

The song's name is written as "夢見る 15歳", which would usually be read "Yume Miru Jūgo-sai"; however, in this case the title is read "Yume Miru Fifteen".

== Track listing ==
All tracks are written by Tsunku, except the lyrics to track 2, which were written by Airin.

CD
No.	Title	Arranger	Length
1.	"Yume Miru 15" (夢見る 15歳, "Dreaming 15-Year-Old")	Shoichiro Hirata	3:44
2.	"Thank You! Crème Brûlée no Yūjō" (サンキュ! クレームブリュレの友情, "Thank You! Crème Brûlée Friendship")	Yuichi Takahashi	3:50
3.	"Yume Miru 15 (Instrumental)"		3:41
Total length:			11:15

Limited A DVD
No.	Title	Length
1.	"Yume Miru 15 (Dance Shot Ver.)"	3:59

Limited B DVD
No.	Title	Length
1.	"Yume Miru 15 (Another Ver.)"

Single V
No.	Title	Length
1.	"Yume Miru 15"
2.	"Yume Miru 15 (Close-up Ver.)"
3.	"Making Eizō" (メイキング映像, "Making Of Video")

== Promotion ==
To promote the single, multiple events were held. Their first live event after their major debut was held at Tokyo Dome LaQua on 30 May, attracting a crowd of roughly 2,000 people. Prior to the event, S/mileage held a Ustream web broadcast.

A handshake "meet-and-greet" event was held at the Æon Chikusa Shopping Centre in Aichi on 5 June. Two special live events were held on 6 and 26 June, at Yokohama Blitz in Kanagawa and Zepp Osaka in Osaka, open to winners of tickets in the draw. A highly limited supply of DVDs containing footage of the 6 June event was made available on 27 September 2010.

== Chart performance ==
The single peaked at #5 on the weekly Oricon singles charts, charting for four weeks. First-week sales were reported at 20,438 copies. The single peaked at #27 on the Billboard Japan Hot 100 for the week of 7 June, charting for two weeks.

== Awards ==
"Yume Miru 15" won an award for Best Song at the 52nd Japan Record Awards, at which S/mileage were also awarded Newcomer of the Year.

== Charts ==
Chart (2010)	Peak position
Oricon Weekly Chart	5
Billboard Japan Hot 100	27

== Personnel ==
- Chino - chorus (1, 2)
- Kanon Fukuda - vocal
- Shoichiro Hirata - programming (1), arrangement (1)
- Yuuka Maeda - vocal
- Saki Ogawa - vocal
- Yuichi Takahashi - programming (2), arrangement (2), guitar (2)
- Tsunku - producer, lyrics (1), composer (1, 2)
- Ayaka Wada - vocal

== Awards ==
=== Japan Record Awards ===
The Japan Record Awards is a major music awards show held annually in Japan by the Japan Composer's Association.

Year	Nominee / work	Award	Result
2010	S/mileage "Yume Miru 15"	New Artist	Won
2010	S/mileage "Yume Miru 15"	Best New Artist	Won
