= Busu ni Naranai Tetsugaku =

- Regular Edition cover

Single by Hello! Project Mobekimasu
- B-side: "Moshimo..." (Regular, Limited A); "Kacchoii Uta" (Limited B, C, D, E, F)
- Released: November 16, 2011 (Japan)
- Genre: J-pop; pop
- Label: Zetima
- Songwriter: Tsunku
- Producer: Tsunku

Morning Musume singles chronology
"Kono Chikyū no Heiwa o Honki de Negatterun Da yo! / Kare to Issho ni Omise ga Shitai!" (2011)	"Busu ni Naranai Tetsugaku" (2011)	"Pyoco Pyoco Ultra" (2012)

Berryz Kobo singles chronology
"Ā, Yo ga Akeru" (2011)	"Busu ni Naranai Tetsugaku" (2011)	"Be Genki (Naseba Naru!)" (2012)

Cute singles chronology
"Sekaiichi Happy na Onna no Ko" (2011)	"Busu ni Naranai Tetsugaku" (2011)	"Kimi wa Jitensha Watashi wa Densha de Kitaku" (2012)

Erina Mano singles chronology
"My Days for You" (2011)	"Busu ni Naranai Tetsugaku" (2011)	"Doki Doki Baby / Tasogare Kōsaten" (2012)

S/mileage singles chronology
"Tachiagirl" (2011)	"Busu ni Naranai Tetsugaku" (2011)	"Please Miniskirt Postwoman!" (2011)

Berryz Kobo×Cute singles chronology
"Amazuppai Haru ni Sakura Saku" (2011)	"Busu ni Naranai Tetsugaku" (2011)	"Chō Happy Song" (2012)

Music video
- Busu ni Naranai Tetsugaku on YouTube

Professional ratings
Review scores
Source	Rating
Hotexpress	Favorable

"Busu ni Naranai Tetsugaku" (ブスにならない哲学; "The Philosophy of How Not to Become Ugly") is a 2011 song by Hello! Project Mobekimasu. The song is a collaboration between Hello! Project acts Morning Musume, Berryz Kobo, Cute, Erina Mano, and Smileage. The single was released on November 16, 2011 on the label Zetima.

== Participants ==
- Morning Musume
- Berryz Kobo
- Cute
- Erina Mano
- S/mileage

== Release information ==
The CD single was released in 7 versions: Regular Edition and Limited Editions A, B, C, D, E, and F. Limited Edition A included a bonus DVD containing a music video for the title song; all the other editions were CD-only.

== Music video ==
The dance sequence appeared in the music video was choreographed by Lucky Ikeda.

== Critical response ==
Hotexpress' Tetsuo Hiraga noted that when watching the music video for the first time he had the impression the song was a declaration of war against other idol groups, particularly the current leader of the idol scene AKB48. The reviewer stated that the song was a characteristic of Tsunku mix of disco and pop. When listening to it, he was impressed with the pool of talent in Hello! Project, as each girl has her distinctive voice, look, and manner of expression.

== Track listing ==
All songs written and composed by Tsunku.

=== Regular Edition, Limited Editions A ===
CD
No.	Title	Length
1.	"Busu ni Naranai Tetsugaku" (ブスにならない哲学)
2.	"Moshimo..." (もしも…)
3.	"Busu ni Naranai Tetsugaku (Instrumental)" (ブスにならない哲学（Instrumental）)

Limited Edition A DVD
No.	Title	Length
1.	"Busu ni Naranai Tetsugaku (Music Video)" (ブスにならない哲学(Music Video))

Limited Edition A bonus

- Event ticket lottery card with a serial number (sealed into plastic CD wrap)

=== Limited Edition B ===
No.	Title	Artists(s)	Length
1.	"Busu ni Naranai Tetsugaku" (ブスにならない哲学)
2.	"Kacchoii Uta" (かっちょ良い歌)	Hello! Project Mobekimasu featuring Morning Musume
3.	"Busu ni Naranai Tetsugaku (Instrumental)" (ブスにならない哲学（Instrumental）)

=== Limited Edition C ===
No.	Title	Artists(s)	Length
1.	"Busu ni Naranai Tetsugaku" (ブスにならない哲学)
2.	"Kacchoii Uta" (かっちょ良い歌)	Hello! Project Mobekimasu featuring Berryz Kobo
3.	"Busu ni Naranai Tetsugaku (Instrumental)" (ブスにならない哲学（Instrumental）)

=== Limited Edition D ===
No.	Title	Artists(s)	Length
1.	"Busu ni Naranai Tetsugaku" (ブスにならない哲学)
2.	"Kacchoii Uta" (かっちょ良い歌)	Hello! Project Mobekimasu featuring Cute
3.	"Busu ni Naranai Tetsugaku (Instrumental)" (ブスにならない哲学（Instrumental）)

=== Limited Edition E ===
No.	Title	Artists(s)	Length
1.	"Busu ni Naranai Tetsugaku" (ブスにならない哲学)
2.	"Kacchoii Uta" (かっちょ良い歌)	Hello! Project Mobekimasu featuring Erina Mano
3.	"Busu ni Naranai Tetsugaku (Instrumental)" (ブスにならない哲学（Instrumental）)

=== Limited Edition F ===
No.	Title	Artists(s)	Length
1.	"Busu ni Naranai Tetsugaku" (ブスにならない哲学)
2.	"Kacchoii Uta" (かっちょ良い歌)	Hello! Project Mobekimasu featuring S/mileage
3.	"Busu ni Naranai Tetsugaku (Instrumental)" (ブスにならない哲学（Instrumental）)

== Charts ==
Chart (2011)	Peak position		
Chart (2011)	Peak position	Oricon Weekly Singles Chart	4
Oricon Monthly Singles Chart	13		
Billboard Japan Hot 100	5		
Billboard Japan Hot Top Airplay	79		
Billboard Japan Hot Singles Sales	3		
Billboard Japan Adult Contemporary Airplay	67		
