= 52nd Japan Record Awards =

2010 Japanese music awards ceremony

- Date: December 30, 2010
- Venue: New National Theater, Tokyo
- Country: Japan
- Hosted by: Masaaki Sakai, Norika Fujiwara

Television/radio coverage
- Network: TBS

The 52nd Japan Record Awards (第52回日本レコード大賞) took place at the New National Theater in Tokyo on December 30, 2010. The ceremony was televised in Japan on TBS.

== Presenters ==
- Masaaki Sakai
- Norika Fujiwara
- TBS commentators
  - Shinichirō Azumi
  - Sylwia Kato
  - Erina Masuda

Radio

- Masao Mukai (TBS commentator)

== Winners and winning works ==
=== Grand Prix ===
- Exile — "I Wish For You"

=== Best Singer Award ===
- Masahiko Kondō

=== Best New Artist Award ===
- S/mileage "Yume Miru 15"

=== Best Album Award ===
- Ikimonogakari — Hajimari no Uta

=== New Artist Award ===
The artists who are awarded the New Artist Award are nominated for the Best New Artist Award.

- S/mileage "Yume Miru 15"
- Iconiq "Change Myself"
- Madoka Kikuchi "Hito Koi Sansa" (人恋さんさ)
- Girls' Generation "Gee"
- S/mileage "Yume Miru 15"

=== Excellence Album Award ===
- Kazuyoshi Saito "ARE YOU READY?"
- Nakamuranaka "Shounen Shoujo"
- Ikimonogakari "Hajimarinouta"
- Nishino Kana "to LOVE"
- JUJU "JUJU"

=== Best Composer Award ===
- FUNKY MONKEY BABYS/Yuka Kawamura "Atohitotsu"

=== Best Arranger Award ===
- Jin Namamura "Futatsu no Kuchibiru"

=== Best Songwriter Award ===
- Uemura Kana "Toile no Kamisama"

=== Encouragement Award by Japan Composer's Association ===
- Sakura Maya

=== Special Award ===
- Sakamoto Fuyumi "Mata Kimi Ni Koi Shiteru"

=== Music Culture Award ===
- Kayama Yuzo

=== Special Achievement Award ===
- Ishii Yoshiko
- Eguchi Hiroshi
- Tani Kei
- Hoshino Tetsuro
- Yoshioka Osamu

=== Excellent Work Award ===
- EXILE "I Wish For You"
- AAA "Aitai Riyuu"
- Ikimonogakari "Arigatou"
- BIG BANG "Tell Me Goodbye"
- Uemura Kana "Toile no Kamisama"
- Hikawa Kiyoshi "Nijiiro no Bayon"
- w-inds "New World"
- AKB48 "Beginner"
- Mizumori Kaori "Matsushima Kikou"
- GIRLS NEXT DOOR "Ready to be a lady"
