= Moe Kamikokuryo =

Japanese singer and model

Moe Kamikokuryo 上國料萌衣
- Born: October 24, 1999 (age 26); Kumamoto Prefecture, Japan
- Genres: J-pop
- Occupations: Singer; model; dancer
- Instrument: Vocals
- Years active: 2015–present
- Labels: Zetima; Up-Front Works

Moe Kamikokuryo (上國料萌衣, Kamikokuryō Moe; born October 24, 1999) is a Japanese pop singer and model. She is a former fourth-generation member of the idol pop group Angerme.

== Biography ==
Moe Kamikokuryo was born on October 24, 1999, in Kumamoto Prefecture, Japan.

In November 2015, Kamikokuryo was chosen as the sole fourth-generation member of Angerme.

In March 2017, Kamikokuryo joined Satoyama movement's new group, Kamiishinaka Kana, alongside Saki Nakajima, Ayumi Ishida and Tomoko Kanazawa.

From 2019 to present day, Kamikokuryo models for fashion brand Evelyn.

On December 20, it was announced that Moe Kamikokuryo would be graduating and leaving from ANGERME and Hello! Project at the end of the group's spring 2025 tour.

On 18 June 2025, Moe Kamikokuryo graduated and left the group.

== Discography ==
for Moe Kamikokuryo's releases with Angerme, see Angerme#Discography.

=== Solo songs ===
- "Michiko no Uta" (2016)
- "Color Girl" (2018)

=== Bibliography ===
==== Photobooks ====
- Moe (October 24, 2018, Odyssey Books, ISBN 978-4908643293)

== Filmography ==
=== Movies ===
- JK Ninja Girls (2017)
- A Turtle's Shell Is a Human's Ribs (2022), Flami (voice)

=== Television shows ===
- The Girls Live (2015–2019)
- Bowling Kakumei P★League (ボウリング革命 P★League) (2017–present)
- Ai・Dol Project (Ai・Dol プロジェクト) (2019)
- Hello! Project presents... "Solo Fes!" (2020)
- Angerme no Kekkyoku wa Love desho!! (2020)
- Hiru nan desu! (ヒルナンデス!) (2021)
- Hello! Project presents... "Solo Fes! 2" (2021)
