= Lilpri =

Japanese media franchise

- Cover of the fifth original DVD volume

ひめチェン！おとぎちっくアイドル リルぷりっ (Hime Chen! Otogi Chikku Aidoru Rirupuri)
- Genre: Magical girl
- Anime television series
- Directed by: Makoto Moriwaki
- Produced by: Mayumi Satō; Shinnosuke Wada; Yuō Sekita
- Written by: Megumi Sasano; Michihiro Tsuchiya; Mitsuko Togakushi; Mitsutaka Hirota; Yoshiko Nakamura; Yuka Yamada
- Music by: Takatsugu Muramatsu
- Studio: Telecom Animation Film
- Original network: TXN (TV Tokyo)
- Original run: April 4, 2010 – March 27, 2011
- Episodes: 51
- Manga
- Written by: Mai Jinna
- Published by: Shogakukan
- Magazine: Pucchigumi
- Original run: February 2009 – 2011
- Volumes: 3
- Manga

Puriri! Lilpri
- Written by: Mai Jinna
- Published by: Shogakukan
- Magazine: Ciao
- Original run: 2011 – 2012
- Volumes: 2
- Video game

Lil'Pri DS: Hime-chan! Apple Pink
- Developer: Sega
- Publisher: Sega
- Genre: Adventure game
- Platform: Nintendo DS
- Released: August 19, 2010

Hime Chen! Otogi Chikku Idol Lilpri (ひめチェン！おとぎちっくアイドル リルぷりっ, Hime Chen! Otogi Chikku Aidoru Rirupuri; officially Spellbound! Magical Princess Lilpri), also known as Lilpri (リルぷりっ, Rirupuri), is a Japanese anime television series directed by Makoto Moriwaki. It was adapted from the Sega arcade game of the same name. It was also adapted into two manga series by Mai Jinna.

== Plot ==
Ringo Yukimori was walking with her mom and finds a bookstore selling three fairy tale books, Snow White, Cinderella, and The Tale of Princess Kaguya. Ringo herself finds the books disappearing. The reason why the books are disappearing happens to be is that Fairyland is trouble because the princesses are missing and their respective worlds are disappearing, causing a ripple effect on Earth where their stories are popular. The Queen of Fairyland sends three Ma-Pets, Sei, Dai, and Ryouku with magic gems to give three girls and transform them into the "Princess Idols" who sings songs to collect Happiness Tones. Later that day, Ringo's family was selling Apple pies, Ringo went walking to give apple pies, then she got run over a flock of people and it brought her to Wish's concert entrances. Ringo meets Leila Takashiro and Natsuki Sasashara at the concert entrances. Finally, the Ma-Pets founded their respective princesses and gave them the Magic gem which became bracelets and transforms the young girls into older female popstars. When they accidentally debuted the concert, the three girls were known as "Lil' Pri". Now, they must use their songs to draw and collect Happiness Tones from humans in order to restore Fairyland.

== Characters ==
=== Lil'Pri ===
Ringo Yukimori (雪森りんご, Yukimori Ringo)
Voiced by: Ayaka Wada

Ringo is a sweet and adventurous girl with a curly and short pink hair with a red headband, red eyes, she wears a white shirt long sleeves with a pink vest with a red bow, a red skirt and dark yellow boots (in summer she wears a white shirt short sleeves with a red bow, a pink and light pink skirt and a red sandals). She dreams of becoming an idol when she's older. Her parents own a bakery that makes "the best apple pie in the world". She has septuplet younger brothers (each named after the days of the week) who are sometimes referred to as "The Seven Dwarfs". Ringo transforms into Snow White and her symbol is an apple. Her Ma-Pet is Sei, whom she tells her family is a parrot. She wears her pink magical diamond in a dark pink heart bracelet on her left wrist that allows her to transform.

Leila Takashiro (高城レイラ, Takashiro Reira)
Voiced by: Yuuka Maeda

Leila is a shy girl with short light yellow hair with a red clips on each side, navy blue eyes, she wears a yellow dress under a light blue sweater with a pink heart with two white wings, black leggings and red Mary Janes (in summer she wear a light blue blouse with a dark blue and white sailor scarf with a yellow button, a yellow shorts and a yellow mary jeans). She tends to be forgetful and clumsy. Her father is Italian and her mother is Japanese. Leila transforms into Cinderella and is represented by a sparkle/diamond. Her Ma-Pet is Dai, a dormouse often confused as a squirrel because of his bushy tail. She wears her light blue magical diamond in a dark blue heart bracelet on her left wrist. Her dad works for a shoe company.

Natsuki Sasahara (笹原名月, Sasahara Natsuki)
Voiced by: Kanon Fukuda

Natsuki is a rich and feisty girl with long violet hair in pigtails with a green bows, dark green eyes, she wears a green and black blouses with bow, a golden yellow belt with a white butterfly, dark purple shorts, long black socks and a yellow and black boots (in summer she wears a lavender blouses with a white frills with an orange butterfly, green overalls and orange shoes) Wherever she goes, she always carries a light green bag. Her family sells fabric for kimono. She is also very good at sports. She transforms into Kaguya-hime and is represented by a crescent moon. Her Ma-Pet is Ryoku, a small green dragon. She wears her purple magical diamond in a dark purple heart bracelet on her left wrist. Natsuki stays with her grandparents despite her parents being out of town.

=== Ma-Pets ===
Sei (セイ)
Voiced by: Reiko Takagi
Sei is a light blue parakeet who is Ringo's Ma-Pet. He is sometimes seen as a natural leader. Sei sleeps next to Ringo on her bed at night.
Dai (ダイ)
Voiced by: Yuka Nakatsukasa
Dai is a gluttonous brown dormouse who is Leila's Ma-Pet. Despite his bushy tail, he is often mistaken as a squirrel, much to his dismay. He has a red lightning bolt strip on his forehead. Because of Leila's klutziness, Dai often has to remind her of the things she forgets. He sleeps in a doll-sized bed in a half completed doll house and owns a hamster wheel.
Ryoku (リョク)
Voiced by: Risa Hayamizu
Ryoku is a turquoise and light blue Chinese dragon who is Natsuki's Ma-Pet. He usually teases Natsuki for not being honest in expressing her feelings. Ryoku is often mistaken as a toy and he sleeps next to Natsuki on a pillow cushion with a small blanket.
Vivi (ビビ, Bibi)
Voiced by: Miyuki Sawashiro
Vivi is a grey cat and the Fairyland Keeper's Ma-Pet. She admires Prince Chris, but detests Lil'Pri. She is constantly searching for the "Ultimate Shine card" to permanently turn Wish back into his human form. She has four circular cards that help her find the "Ultimate Shine." In the human world, she inhabits one of the trees in Sakura Park. She can fly by enlarging her ears. She later finds out that Lil'Pri was the Ultimate Shine.

=== Others ===
Wish (ウィッシュ, Wisshu)
Voiced by: Tetsuya Kakihara
Wish is a popular male idol in the series who sings and endorses products. He is known for his light blue short hair and crimson eyes (When he transformed into a white rabbit he wears a black and yellow hat, a dark green suit with a red bow and yellow vest). In reality, his real name is Prince Chris (クリス王子, Kurisu Oji), the prince of Fairyland who sent by his mother to help Lilpri gather Happiness Tones. When he becomes physically tired, he transforms into a rabbit. It is also revealed that he was the one who retrieved the magic stones that turns the girls into Lilpri. To help him change back and forth in his forms, he was given a watch by the Queen. The watch also contains information on when a tear in Fairyland would appear. The watch also has message recording abilities and hologram creation. In the past, he was a charming prince, always smiling. But ever since he turned into a rabbit, he never smiled until Lilpri came along. After the Ultimate Shine was found, he was restored into his original form for life and he continues to become an idol in the human world. It is a secret between himself and Vivi that if he continues to be in his rabbit form, he will eventually become a normal rabbit for life, unable to talk or sing.
Queen (女王, Joō)
Voiced by: Rei Sakuma
The good-hearted ruler of Fairyland. She is also Chris's mother. She has blue hair and pink eyes. She has a remarkably large crown and a veil. The Queen misses her son very dearly and is good at making rice omelets.
Roo (ルゥ, Rū)
Voiced by: Akemi Kanda
Roo is a nymph of Fairyland. She specializes in flowers and is always seen with the Queen. She acted as Lilpri's guide upon their arrival in Fairyland.
Ringorō Yukimori (雪森林檎朗, Yukimori Ringorō)
Voiced by: Tokuyoshi Kawashima
Ringo's father. He does not want to change his apple pie's taste because it was inspired by Ringo's mother in the past.
Fujiko Yukimori (雪森フジコ, Yukimori Fujiko)
Voiced by: Yuuka Uchikawa
Ringo's mother. She has red curly hair; She helps Ringo's father with the store and watches her eight children.
Ringo's Septuplet Brothers (りんごの弟（七つ子）, Ringo no Otōto (Nanatsugo))
Voiced by: Azusa Kataoka
Ringo's Septuplet brothers who are named after the days of the week. They are sometimes called "The Seven Dwarfs".
Marco Peperoncino (マルコ・パパロンチーノ, Maruko Paparonchīno)
Voiced by: Hiroshi Tsuchida
Leila's father. He is Italian and first met Leila's mother at an airport and comments that their names were similar. He owns a shoe company called "Crystal Shoes".
Maruko Takashiro (高城円子, Takashiro Maruko)
Voiced by: Mana Hirata
Leila's mother. She is one of the airport's flight attendant and also met Leila's father at an airport.
Natsuki's Grandparents (夏樹の祖父母, Natsuki no Sofubo)
Voiced by: Kiyohito Yoshikai (Grandfather) and Kyouko Yamaguchi (Grandmother)
Natsuki's grandparents. She lives with them while her parents are absent.
Tarō Atsui (熱井太郎, Atsui Tarō)
Voiced by: Kenta Miyake
He is the teacher of Lilpri's school. He is married to Moeko. He believes in connection through feelings of the heart.

== Media ==
=== Anime ===
==== Episodes ====
- Each of the episodes end with Pri! (☆ぷりっ, Puri).

No.	Title	Original release date
1	"We Found the Princesses"; Transliteration: "Purinsesu Miitsuketa☆Puri!" (Japanese: プリンセスみーつけた☆ぷりっ！)	April 4, 2010
Ringo Yukimori helps her father sell apple pies at the concert hall where Wish's concert is being held. As Ringo could not get a ticket, she tries to bring a gift apple pie to Wish, but the security personnel rejects. Despite all that, she manages to get in and befriends Leila Takashiro and Natsuki Sasahara. Meanwhile, three animals (called "Ma-Pets"), Sei, Dai and Ryoku, arrive at the human world to find the three princesses to collect Happiness Tones for Fairyland. When the princesses (who turned out to be Ringo, Leila and Natsuki) are finally found, they eventually have a debut. Since then, they are known as "Lil'Pri" (short for Little Princess). Transformation: Princess Fairytale
2	"The Ma-pets' Big Mistake"; Transliteration: "Mapetto Daishippai☆Puri!" (Japanese: 魔ペット大失敗☆ぷりっ！)	April 11, 2010
Ringo's father starts preparing apple pies for the next day while she, Leila, Natsuki and their Ma-Pets, Sei, Dai, and Ryoku, are discussing the events from the day before. After finishing some of the work, Sei goes into the kitchen to get a drink of water. At the kitchen, however, Sei manages to find the apple pies for tomorrow. He tries his best to hold back his desire to devour them, but is overwhelmed by the smell. This causes Sei, Dai and Ryoku, to eat all the apple pies. Transformation: Heart♥Heart Waitress
3	"The Princess is Forgetful"; Transliteration: "Himesama wa Wasurenbo☆Puri!" (Japanese: ひめさまは忘れんぼ☆ぷりっ！)	April 18, 2010
Lil'Pri's teacher, Tarou Atsui, is very intense from the beginning and suggests "making something that will be the class's trademark for tomorrow's excursion". While none of his students pay much attention, he doesn't give up. His next suggestion is to stitch all of their handkerchiefs together to make a flag. However, all the students just leave their handkerchiefs and go home. Mr. Atsui stitches them together to make it more flag-like. When Leila comes back to school to get her forgotten thing, she decides to restitch them. But on the day of the excursion, she forgets the flag. Transformation: Western Honey
4	"Master Arrives"; Transliteration: "Oshishousama ga Yatte Kita☆Puri!" (Japanese: お師匠さまがやってきた☆ぷりっ！)	April 25, 2010
Natsuki stares at the moon one night when Ryoku teases her about missing her parents. The two fight and decide to stay distant from each other. Ringo and Leila visit Natsuki's house and run into Natsuki's grandparents. When they leave for a business trip, Natsuki's grandmother tells her that a master of dance named Sachie Kobayashi will come by to pick up some fabric. While Natsuki is telling this story, a voice is call at the front door. Natsuki rushes to the front door with Sachie Kobayashi waiting there. With every "ha" she says, the master is revealed to be an "overly strict" person. Transformation: Cherry Colored Beauty
5	"Lost and in Big Trouble"; Transliteration: "Maigo de Oosawagi☆Puri!" (Japanese: まいごで大さわぎ☆ぷりっ！)	May 2, 2010
Ringo, Leila and Natsuki are at the department store to see Wish's giant poster. Their Ma-Pets are apparently in awe during their first visit to a department store. But suddenly, Ryoku cries out with everybody turning around, seeing a young boy waving Ryoku around by his tail. Natsuki rushes to save Ryoku, but the boy refuses. Ringo befriends the boy and learns that he is Hayata, the child that was announced to be lost. Since they were unable to find his mother in the vicinity, the girls take him to the Lost Children Center. But when they try to give him up, they realize that he has disappeared. Transformation: Twinkle March
6	"Princess Training"; Transliteration: "Purinsesu Shugyou da yo☆Puri!" (Japanese: プリンセス修行だヨ☆ぷりっ！)	May 9, 2010
Lilpri is busy watching a comedy TV show when a commercial with Wish comes on. The Ma-Pets realize that they have more important business, which is "making people happy and saving Fairyland". The Ma-Pets became full of passion and try to undergo training to level up their princess power. Transformation: Princess Fairytale
7	"I Quit Training"; Transliteration: "Okeiko Yaameta☆puri!" (Japanese: おケイコやーめた☆ぷりっ！)	May 16, 2010
Lilpri's classmate, Saotome Kōtarō, missed a day of school because of a cold. However, rumor has it that he stayed home to practice for a violin recital. On their way home, Ringo and her friends keep talking about Saotome. When someone mentions that he's aiming to become a pro, they get in a frenzy, saying he will become a celebrity. But soon they realize that an unfamiliar voice has joined the conversation. The mysterious rabbit (Chris) who had helped them before is back. Chris says that he came from Fairyland, and that he will help Lilpri gather Happiness Tones. Then, Chris pulls something out from a bush and gives it to Ringo. What Chris took out was a violin case with the name "Saotome" on it. Transformation: Melody Planet
8	"Chase After Wish"; Transliteration: "Wish wo Oikakero☆Puri!" (Japanese: ウィッシュをおいかけろ☆ぷりっ！)	May 23, 2010
Lilpri have a face-off with another fan of Wish, Tsugumi, in front of a CD store for the last Wish handshake ticket. They get into a heated argument, but derails it when they end up starting a competition to see who can get Wish's autograph first. The four girls try different methods to get his autograph, but all fails. Depressed, Tsugumi decides to cheer herself up with her CD, but ends up disappearing. But with the help of Ringo, Tsugumi befriends the girls and together they try to get Wish's autograph. Transformation: GoGo! Rock Gal
9	"PriPri Soccer"; Transliteration: "Puripuri Sakkā☆Puri" (Japanese: ぷりぷりサッカー☆ぷりっ！)	May 24, 2010
One day, Natsuki's friend, Takeshi, asks her to help out in his soccer team, "Hanasaki Kickers", by playing in a match for them. Due to the team never winning a game, they declare a disband after the next match. Natsuki refuses but joins instead when she unleashes her athletic prowess. When The day of the match comes near, one of the players, Mamoru, asks Natsuki to withdraw from the match for Kakeru, the team's best player. Transformation: Fruity Cheerleader
10	"Lovey-Dovey in Haiku Form"; Transliteration: "Goshichigo de Raburabu☆puri!" (Japanese: 五七五でラブラブ☆ぷりっ！)	June 6, 2010
Sei falls in love with an old man's canary named Ran. He tries everything in his repertoire to make Ran fall for him, but is not receptive. Ringo and her friends were curious about why the old man kept sighing. He calls himself "Masaki Oka" and he runs a Haiku club in the neighborhood. Apparently, Masaki is having trouble coming up with a good Haiku. According to him, Ran sings with her beautiful voice when a good Haiku is recited to her. But since then, it did not happen. In order to cheer him up, Lilpri decides to help him. Transformation: Rainbow Colored Angel
11	"A Big Cinderella"; Transliteration: "Biggu na Shinderera☆Puri!" (Japanese: ビッグなシンデレラ☆ぷりっ！)	June 13, 2010
A female neighborhood friend of Leila has decided to get married. While Leila was obviously invited to the ceremony, she also wanted Ringo and Natsuki to tag along. When Ringo and Natsuki asked, Leila reveals that the groom (who is also revealed to be their teacher), Mr. Atsui, wants Ringo and Natsuki to be the bride's veil girls and entrusted Leila with delivering the bride's present. As Mr. Atsui shows the girls a picture of him and the bride's present, it was revealed to be a giant shoe, modelled after Cinderella's slipper. The girls are blown away by its size, but Mr. Atsui says that it fits his bride perfectly. On the day of the wedding, Leila oversleeps. Transformation: Innocence Fairy
12	"The Best Apple Pie in the World"; Transliteration: "Sekaiichi no Appuru Pai☆Puri!" (Japanese: 世界一のアップルパイ☆ぷりっ！)	June 20, 2010
Ringo and Saotome argue about whose apple pie is "the best in the world". While Ringo says that her father's the "best", Saotome says that "being the best" is not easy. Ringo counters, but Saotome ups the ante by saying that he will accept her claim if her father wins the first annual apple pie contest. After Ringo gets back, she immediately asks her father to participate in the apple pie contest. But no matter how many times she implores him, he wouldn't agree to participate. On the next day, when Ringo tells her friends that her father won't compete, Saotome shows up and starts another argument. He claims that Ringo's father had no confidence and ran. Helpless, Ringo can't herself and says that her "father will definitely compete". Transformation: Berry Decoration
13	"The Final Princess Change?"; Transliteration: "Saigo no Himechen?☆Puri!" (Japanese: さいごのひめチェン？☆ぷりっ！)	June 27, 2010
Lil'Pri is surprised by the unexpected attention but agree to "try even harder to make everybody happy". The Ma-Pets seem to be happy about the decision, but then realized that they only have one Princess Change Card left! Ringo and her friends are worried that they can now only do their transformation once. Chris then appears and delivers them a message from Wish, wanting them to appear on his show once again. With only one card left, Lil'Pri gets psyched to use the last card to save Fairyland in one last concerted effort. On their way to the concert, they meet a girl who asks them to find her doll "Josephine", which causes them to be late for the concert. But the truth is revealed, the girl is actually a liar like her father. Transformation: Noble Prince
14	"We've Come to Fairy Land"; Transliteration: "Otogi no Kuni ni Kichatta☆Puri!" (Japanese: おとぎの国にきちゃった☆ぷりっ！)	July 4, 2010
After using the last Change Card, The Queen invites Lil'Pri to come to Fairyland for the very first time. Transformation: Concert Soirée
15	"Seriously? Seriously Magic"; Transliteration: "Maji? Maji Majikku☆Puri!" (Japanese: マジ？まじマジック☆ぷりっ！)	July 11, 2010
Lil'Pri's classmate, Tenko, knows how to perform magic. She wants to be the assistant of the world's famous magician, Say-Fu, but Say-Fu doesn't really like kids. Transformation: Magical Card Dress
16	"Happy Shoes and the Release Event"; Transliteration: "Happī Kutsu to Rirīsuibento☆Puri!" (Japanese: ハッピー靴とリリースイベント☆ぷり！)	July 18, 2010
Leila invites Ringo and Natsuki to a release party at Crystal Shoes, the company whom her father works for. There, they meet Kumi Ochiai, the assistant of the famous shoe designer, Mio Ikari. During the event, however, Mio Ikari complains about how the models were not putting enough effort into modelling her shoes and how "poorly designed" Kumi's shoes were. Transformation: Wrapping Mini Dress
17	"Mermaid Lili"; Transliteration: "Māmeido Ririchan☆Puri" (Japanese: マーメイド・リリちゃん☆ぷりっ！)	July 25, 2010
On a trip to the beach, Lil'Pri meets Lili, the mermaid who fell through a tear from Fairyland. Lili at first refuses to go back, but then accepts when she realizes that her friends are looking for her. Transformation: Paradise Marine
18	"Welcome Home, Leila's Dad"; Transliteration: "Okaeri, Reira Papa☆Puri!" (Japanese: おかえり、レイラパパ☆ぷりっ！)	August 2, 2010
Leila's father returns along with his friend, Tomaso. Tomaso's task, however, is to search for Lil'Pri, which frightens Leila and her friends. At first, the girls and their Ma-Pets assumed that he wants to unmask Lil'Pri's secret. But after a long search, it is revealed that Tomaso wanted them to model for Crystal Shoes. Transformation: Colorific Rock
19	"A Test of Courage"; Transliteration: "Kimodameshida Zoutsu☆Puri!" (Japanese: きもだめしだゾーッ☆ぷりっ！)	August 9, 2010
Lil'Pri heads to school for a test of courage, They get paired up with Saotome and another girl named Mimiko to find 5 slips with are hidden in the school. Transformation: Electric Doll
20	"Remember! Ma-Pets"; Transliteration: "Omoidase! Ma Petto☆Puri!" (Japanese: 思いだせ！魔ペット☆ぷりっ！)	August 16, 2010
When the Ma-Pets lose their memories, they have to recover them before Lil'Pri's joint concert with Wish begins. Transformation: Concert Soirée
21	"The Princess is the Mother"; Transliteration: "Himesama ga Okasama☆Puri!" (Japanese: ひめさまがおかあさま☆ぷりっ！)	August 21, 2010
Ringo's mother has to look after Ai, the daughter of her good friend, Tomoko. Ringo is overjoyed of being the "mother". But when her septuplet little brothers, try to get her attention, Ringo soon realizes that being a parent is tough. Transformation: Diamond Waitress
22	"Off we go! Summer Memories"; Transliteration: "Natsu no omoide!☆Puri!" (Japanese: 夏の思い出とんじゃビー！☆ぷりっ！)	August 28, 2010
Summer vacation is almost over and Lil'Pri is discussing about the homework that Mr. Atsui issued. When they were told to create "hot and intense memories", their classmate, Momoka Hoshino, is having trouble creating one. So, the girls decide to watch a popular kids's show called "Tobiuo Man" at Ringo's house. While they are watching the show, the girls fall asleep halfway and find out that they are on Tobiuo Planet. Transformation: Petit Ranger
23	"A Gingerbread House Fell From the Sky"; Transliteration: "Okashi no Ie ga Ochi Tekita☆Puri!" (Japanese: おかしの家が落ちてきた☆ぷりっ！)	September 5, 2010
A gingerbread house falls from a tear one night. The next day, the owner is revealed to be an old lady, which causes Lil'Pri to think she is a witch. Transformation: Retro Fever
24	"The Popular Princess Kaguya"; Transliteration: "Motemote Kaguyahime☆Puri!" (Japanese: モテモテかぐやひめ☆ぷりっ！)	September 12, 2010
Natsuki's house is having a party where the daughter of the family finds her fiancé. All the guests (who turned out to be boys) fantasize over Natsuki, but Kouji, Natsuki's pushy childhood friend and self-proclaimed fiancé, is the most eager. Transformation: Pastel Bunny
25	"The Secret's Out"; Transliteration: "Himitsuga bare Chatta!☆Puri!" (Japanese: ひみつがバレちゃった！☆ぷりっ！)	September 19, 2010
Lil'Pri's secret is almost revealed by three of their schoolmates. With the help of Wish and the Queen of Fairyland, however, their secret is safe. Transformation: Floria One Piece
26	"The Prince of Fairy Land"; Transliteration: "Otogi no Kuni no Oujisama☆Puri!" (Japanese: おとぎの国の王子さま☆ぷりっ！)	September 26, 2010
As Lil'Pri arrive to Fairyland after their identity gets nearly revealed, the Queen, explains that Wish is Chris, the prince of Fairyland. Transformation: Happiness Clover
27	"The Omelet Rice of Hopes and Dreams"; Transliteration: "Yumetokibouno Omuraisu☆Puri!" (Japanese: ゆめときぼうのオムライス☆ぷりっ！)	October 3, 2010
Lil'Pri finds out the real purpose of Wish becoming an idol. Transformation: Princess Fairytale
28	"Vivi, the Prankster Ma-Pet Arrives"; Transliteration: "Itazura ma petto, Bibidechi☆Puri!" (Japanese: いたずら魔ペット、ビビでち☆ぷりっ！)	October 10, 2010
Vivi, known as the "mischievous Ma-Pet", arrives and steals cards for the "Ultimate Shine". Transformation: Cutie Police
29	"Who's a Good Fit for the Student Body Prez?"; Transliteration: "Iinchou hadaregaii Dechou☆Puri!" (Japanese: 委員長はだれがいーんでちょう☆ぷりっ！)	October 17, 2010
Lil'Pri's class has to decide who will be the class representative for the second semester. The first semester representative, Tachibana Mamiko, instantly raises her hand as a candidate. However, the entire class is in a state of unease due to her constant nagging and strictness, which earns her the nickname "Nag-iko". Suddenly, Saotome nominates Ringo for class representative. Ringo claims that her being class rep is impossible, but the class insists. Seeing the situation, Mr. Atsui lets Ringo be the class rep for three days as a test. Transformation: Polka-Dot Puppy
30	"The One-Inch Boy"; Transliteration: "Issun-bōshi☆Puri" (Japanese: 一寸法師☆りっ)	October 24, 2010
Lil'Pri is having a picnic in the park when the One-Inch Boy and his wife, Momiji, fall through a tear from Fairyland. On their way down, the two begin quarreling. The quarrel then worsens as the girls are unable to do anything. The cause of this is that the One-Inch Boy seems to have become a complete slacker. Transformation: Cool Pirates
31	"I Spy a Tiny Witch"; Transliteration: "Chiisa na Majo mitsuketadechi☆Puri!" (Japanese: 小さな魔女みつけたでち☆ぷりっ！)	October 31, 2010
On their way home from school, Lil'Pri runs into their classmate, Natsume Mahiru, and her little sister, Manatsu. At close glance, Manatsu has a bit of a resemblance of a witch, which reveals that they are going participate in the costume festival where everyone dresses up however they want and parades through the Hanasaki District. Manatsu wants to be a witch while Natsume wants to be a vampire. Hearing this, Lil'Pri decides to join. While the girls make their costumes at Leila's house, Manatsu is upset that she could not have a wand. This, however, causes Natsume to go through the trouble of making a wand. Transformation: Trick or Treat
32	"Resound, Lil' Pri's Song"; Transliteration: "Todoke, Rirupuri no uta☆Puri!" (Japanese: とどけ、リルぷりっの歌☆ぷりっ！)	November 7, 2010
Lil'Pri is invited by Wish to perform live at Ikeike Studio, but when the princess of Enka, Yuuko Nakajyou, tells them that their song is "lacking" soul, while exploring the studio they learn the true meaning of singing Transformation: Soul Diva
33	"Pri-pri Cupid"; Transliteration: "Puripuri kyupiddo☆Puri!" (Japanese: ぷりぷりキューピッド☆ぷりっ！)	November 14, 2010
Ringo and Natsuki get into a fight over helping a middle school boy confess his feelings to his classmate. Transformation: Cherry Sailor
34	"The Princess Troupe"; Transliteration: "Himesama gekijou☆Puri!" (Japanese: ひめさまげきじょう☆ぷりっ！)	November 21, 2010
Lil'Pri's class decides to do a play for the school arts festival. However, when discussing what kind of play they want to do, the class is split and unable to come to a consensus. Saotome stands up and says they should do a play called "Go Go Hero Saotome" where he plays the lead role via kisses the heroine in the end. Mistaking the heroine's role as "making costumes", Leila is picked to play the role, much to the class's surprise and to her dismay. Transformation: Lovely Pierrot
35	"Oh No! Trouble with the Magic Card"	November 28, 2010
Thinking the mistress has the Ultimate Shine, Vivi steals a card from her mistress, which turns out to be a "Liar" card. It attaches itself to Natsuki, who hates lies. Transformation: Sunshine Waltz
36	"Naan and Curry Idol or What a Magnificent Idol"	December 4, 2010
Lil'Pri's classmate, Okada, finds a lamp that dropped from the Fairyland. A genie named Alijiji pops out and tells Okada that he will grant three of his wishes. When Okada wishes to be an idol like Wish, everything is not exactly what it seems. Transformation: Arabian Queen
37	"Where'd the Ma-Pet Pet Go?"	December 11, 2010
It is Ma-Pet day and Lil'Pri's Ma-Pets try to do the reverse by getting the girls a Wish poster Transformation: Ribbon Merry-Go-Round
38	"Santa Claus from Hanasaki Town"	December 18, 2010
Santarou, the grandfather of Lil'Pri's classmate, Ono, dresses up as Santa for Hanasaki's shopping district. At the same time, Ono thinks it is embarrassing, but learns the true meaning of it. Transformation: Merry Merry Christmas
39	"Huge Party in Fairy Land"	December 25, 2010
On New Year's Eve, a huge party is being held at the Queen's castle. To make a new year happen, Lil'Pri and the inhabitants of Fairyland must perform to make Kukkuru appear for Ikkuru. Meanwhile, at the end, a witch tricks the Fairyland's Keeper into setting her free. Transformation: Shiny Big Ribbon
40	"The Princesses Go On Forever"	January 8, 2011
Lil'Pri and their Ma-Pets go on a search for their new song. However, when they stop help Roo in the garden, their new song is discovered. Transformation: Happy Wedding
41	"Welcome, Red Riding Hood"	January 15, 2011
Chris tells Lil'Pri that Little Red Riding Hood is in the human world. They quickly found her, but is unable to move due to hunger. Azuki Yamamori, a high school student, passes by carrying a large paper bag, saying that her younger sister, Botan (who goes to the same kindergarten as Ringo's brothers), is having a birthday party. Seeing the famished Little Red Riding Hood, Azuki offers her one of the hamburgers from her bag. Little Red Riding Hood is overjoyed at the deliciousness of her hamburger and wants to do something in return for Azuki. She is then asked to help set up for Botan's birthday party. Meanwhile, in Fairyland, the Big Bad Wolf is searching for her. Transformation: Peony Maiden
42	"A Swan Dive Into Karen"	January 22, 2011
Ringo goes on a skating trip with her family. Watching her seven brothers and Sei, she skates full speed. Ringo is about to collide with the wall when a girl gallantly appears and saves her at the last second. Ringo tries to thank the girl, but then realized that she is Karen, the figure skating idol who is known for her jump. That afternoon, Ringo and Sei are eating lunch by the lake when a swan suddenly appears and steals them. As they chase after it (whose name is later revealed to be "Swan"), they spot a depressed Karen watching the swans. The director of the center, who is also the caretaker of the swans, explains that ever since Karen broke her leg, she lost confidence in doing her famous jump. Similarly, Swan hurt his wing and is afraid of flying. Hearing this, Ringo and her friends decide to help the two gain their confidence. Transformation: Butterfly Tutu
43	"Dai's on a Diet"	January 29, 2011
Dai has an endless eating habit, which causes him to gain weight. In an effort to help him lose weight, Leila and the two other Ma-Pets try different methods, but all failed. Meanwhile, Dai disappeared for more food when Leila checks out the squirrel show. Transformation: Pretty Kitty
44	"Ryoku Wants to Be a Dragon"	February 5, 2011
After getting Natsuki hurt when a small dog barks at them, Ryoku gets depressed while questioning himself if he is useless. Moping by himself, Ryoku finds a partitioning screen in Natsuki's house with a powerful dragon and tiger on it. According to Natsuki's grandfather, the dragon and tiger are said to be rivals in the position of being the strongest animal. With the determination of becoming a powerful dragon, Ryoku begins to train. Transformation: Show Time Orb
45	"Otohime's Hospitality"	February 12, 2011
With the Urashima Taro characters falling through a tear from Fairyland, Otohime passes out food to people. Unawaringly, it is causing aging problems. Transformation: Crème Pâtissière
46	"Goodbye, Wish"; Transliteration: "Sayonara Wishu☆Puri" (Japanese: さようならウィッシュ☆りっ)	February 19, 2011
Vivi is left to look after Lil'Pri when Chris is turn into a normal rabbit. Vivi goes to her mistress to see if she can help. She meets the witch who convinces her to take her to the human world Transformation: Soft Mix Jacket
47	"Number 1?! The Witch is Here"	February 26, 2011
Wanting to be the most beautiful in Fairyland, the Witch attempts to attack Lil'Pri. Under the attack, the girls manage to escape to Fairyland with the Queen's assistance. However, because the witch has come to the human world, many odd things are happening around Fairyland, which is a sign that Fairyland will disappear. The Queen says that the girls must wear the Special Dress with their increased Princess Power to save Fairyland. But on one condition, Lil'Pri must go on a journey to find the materials for the Special Dress: the Golden Needle, the Thread of Light, and the Rainbow Cloth. Transformation: Royal Antique
48	"Find the Special Dress"	March 5, 2011
The girls have come to the One-Inch Boy's village in Fairy Land. However, they and the entire village were swallowed up by a tear and dropped into the human world. It is revealed that the tears are appearing all over Fairyland. As a result, many characters have fallen to the human world and are on the verge of causing a panic. Meanwhile, having gotten the Golden Needle at One-Inch Boy's village, the girls have come to the Elves' Shoe Shop to get the Thread of Light. The girls ask for the Thread of Light, but the elves are too busy with work and can't take care of the worm that creates the thread, Imotan. The girls, who want the Thread of Light no matter what, try to obtain the thread by taking care of Imotan themselves. Transformation: Smart British
49	"Goodbye, Lil' Pri"; Transliteration: "Sayonara Rirupuri☆Puri" (Japanese: さようならリルぷり☆りっ)	March 13, 2011
There is no longer anything the girls can do. After agonizing over finding something they can do, they decide to consult with the Queen of Fairy Land. The girls have obtained all three items to make the Special Dress. However, having revealed Lil' Pri's identity to their classmates, they can no longer become Lil' Pri. Chaos spreads through the human world as people slowly forget the fairy tales. There is no longer anything the girls can do. After agonizing over finding something they can do, they decide to consult with the Queen of Fairy Land. Thinking that they need to get to the queen as soon as possible, they start to head for Fairy Land when a giant tear opens in the sky and the queen's castle comes falling through it. The people watch nervously. The characters from Fairy Land become greatly panicked as things get even worse for the human world. The girls, figuring they should see the queen, head for the castle in the human world. Transformation: Classic Checker
50	"Shine, True Princesses"	March 19, 2011
Ringo, Leila and Natsuki can no longer transform into Lilpri after revealing their secret. But, they gain courage to find the Special Dress. Transformation: True Princess Symphony (Part 1)
51	"Pri-pri Lil' Pri"; Transliteration: "Puripuri Rirupuri☆Puri" (Japanese: ぷりぷりリルぷ☆りっ)	March 27, 2011
Ringo, Leila and Natsuki collect enough Happiness Tones and restore Fairyland. But sadly, they also have to depart from Fairyland. Transformation: True Princess Symphony (Part 2)

==== Music ====
- All songs are in order by episodes.

===== Sung by Lil'Pri =====
Little Princess (リトル・プリンセス, Ritoru Purinsesu)
Episodes 1-13 and 51
Happy Go Lucky! (ハッピー・ゴー・ラッキー！, Happī gō Rakkī)
Episodes 14–26
Prospect (プロスペクト, Purosupekuto)
Episodes 27–39
Infinite Wonder Girls (無限ワンダーガールズ, Mugen Wandāgāruzu)
Episodes 40–49

===== Opening/Ending =====
Little Princess (リトル・プリンセス, Ritoru Purinsesu) and Otona ni Naru tte Muzukashī!!! (大人になるって難しい！！！, lit. It's Hard To Grow Up!!!) was used from episodes 1-25.

Idolulu (アイドルール, Aidorūru) and Vira Vira Virou (ヴィラヴィラヴィロウ, Bira Bira Birō) were used for episodes 26–51

=== Video game ===
A videogame, based on the anime, was released on 19 August 2010 in Japan, titled "Lilpri DS: Hime-Chan! Apple Pink".

=== Manga ===
Lilpri was adapted into two manga series by Mai Jinna.

Although the first series has the same title, it was first published in February 2009, a year before the anime. The second series, titled Puriri! Lilpri, was published in 2011.
