= Meimi Tamura =

Japanese actress and singer (born 1998)

- 田村芽実
- Born: October 30, 1998 (age 27); Isesaki, Gunma, Japan
- Occupations: Actress; singer
- Musical career
- Genre: J-pop
- Website: tamurameimi.com

Meimi Tamura (田村芽実, Tamura Meimi; born October 30, 1998) is a Japanese actress and singer. She is a former member of the Hello! Project group Angerme.

== Early life and background ==
Meimi Tamura's mother was a troupe organizer and actor in Gunma Prefecture, Japan. Her elder sister, Karen Tamura, is also an actress. Influence from her mother and sister inspired Meimi in working to become an actress.

== Career ==
=== 2004–2010: Early acting career ===
Tamura's first public performance took place in the Concert Tour of Japanese Enka singer Kiyoshi Hikawa, on the stage in Okinawa Convention Center March 27, 2004, as a member of the Dodonpa Kids when she was five years old.

At age of 10 she was cast in the 2009 musical Shugo Chara as Yaya Yuiki. After co-starring with then S/mileage members, Yuuka Maeda (who played Amu), Kanon Fukuda (who played Nadeshiko) and Ayaka Wada (who played a student and X-Egg) in this musical, she became a S/mileage fan herself, and she went to several S/mileage concerts.

=== 2011–2016: Smileage and Angerme ===
On May 29, 2011, at S/mileage's major debut first anniversary event, producer Tsunku announced that new members will be added to the group and an audition was subsequently held by Up-Front Agency. Tamura, along with approximately 2,000 other contestants attended the first round of the audition held in Shibuya, Tokyo, in June 2011. Tamura was chosen to proceed to the second round with 49 other contestants on July 9, 2011. Only 12 contestants, including Tamura, made it to the third round. The third round last for two days in the form of a training camp, which took place in a remote location two hours away from Tokyo. Contestants had their dancing and vocal abilities assessed by choreographer Yoshiko, vocal coach Mariko Ueno and producer Tsunku. At the end of the third round, Tamura passed the audition with four other contestants (Akari Takeuchi, Rina Katsuta, Fuyuka Kosuga, and Kana Nakanishi). These five girls became S/mileage's sub-members On October 16, Tamura was promoted to official members of the group. With the name changed to ANGERME in 2014, Tamura continued as a main vocalist in the group until she graduated on May 30, 2016.

=== 2016–present: Post-Angerme ===
On December 13, Tamura auditioned for the role of Annie in Annie the Musical, but was unsuccessful in obtaining the part. On January 22, 2017, Tamura had been cast as Minako Honda on stage play Minako-taiyo ni Natta Utahime, which would run through May 17–21. On February 16, 2017, a media report confirmed that Tamura had left UP-FRONT GROUP and she was currently working as a freelance without a manager.

On April 1, Tamura announced she was cast in the Peacepit stage play Grand Guignol, the latest installment in playwright Suemitsu Kenichi's TRUMP series that also includes LILIUM -Lilium Shoujo Junketsu Kageki-. It would run from July 29 to August 20.

On May 1, Tamura joined the agency BMI. On September 29, Tamura appeared on TV Asahi's "Kanjani ∞ The Mozart Music King No.1 Decision Fight".

On October 15, she performed in the music theater show Funfair. It was revealed on Tamura's official website that she would be holding a limited birthday event on October 29 with two shows, to celebrate her 19th birthday. It was also announced that Tamura will be participating in the stage play Kyo no Hotarubi from November 3 to 26 at the Meijiza, one of the oldest theaters in Japan.

On August 21, 2018, a teaser trailer or short version video clip for her first solo release music video was posted on YouTube by Victor Entertainment.

From October 10 to October 25, Tamura performed as Jaquenetta in the Toho's production of Love's Labour's Lost -Koi no Honeorizon-, which is a Japanese version of The Public Theater's 2013 musical adaptation of Shakespeare's Love's Labour's Lost.

In 2020-27, Tamura played roles in several musical stage productions in Japan:

- February 2020 - Maria in West Side Story.
- June 2020-October 2022 - Amber Von Tussle in Hairspray, a role which she played again from August till October 2022.
- March-April 2021 - Nina Rosario in In the Heights.
- August 2021 - Pritti Pasha in Everybody's Talking About Jamie.
- November 2021 - Betty Rizzo in Grease.
- July 2022 - Claudia in Claudia, which was Minako Honda's final theatre role before she died.
- January-February 2023 - Janis Sarkisian in Mean Girls.
- 8 December 2023-9 January 2024 - Mathilde De La Mole in Le Rouge et le Noir.
- 31 January-16 March 2025 - Anne Boleyn in Six
- 27 April-8 June 2025 - Lauren in Kinky Boots.
- January-March 2026 - Vivian Ward in Pretty Woman.
- March 2027 - Johanna Barker in Sweeney Todd: The Demon Barber of Fleet Street

From January 19 through January 23 2022, Tamura Meimi played a leading role in "Equal," a two-man play about childhood friends attempting to use alchemy to achieve immortality. "Equal" is traditionally performed with two men, and this marks the first time a production has been staged with two female leads.

On September 17, it was announced that Tamura was cast in the roles of Nancy Grahl and Orsola in the Toho production "Da Ponte ~Mozart no Kage ni Kakureta Mou Hitori no Tensai~". The production will run preview performances From June 21 through June 25, 2023 and will run at the Tatemono Brillia Hall in Tokyo from July 9 through July 16, 2023.

On January 27, it was announced Tamura would be voicing Nessarose in the Japanese dubbing of the film Wicked and Wicked: For Good.

== Discography ==
=== Studio albums ===
| Title | Album details | Peak chart positions | |
| Title | Album details | Oricon | Hot Albums |
|---|---|---|---|
| Fig (無花果, Ichijiku) | Released: April 8, 2020; Label: Victor Entertainment; Formats: CD, digital download | 47 | 68 |

=== Extended plays ===
| Title | Album details | Peak chart positions | |
| Title | Album details | Oricon | Hot Albums |
|---|---|---|---|
| Sprout | Released: March 20, 2019; Label: Victor Entertainment; Formats: CD, digital download | 49 | 80 |

=== Singles ===
| Title | Year | Peak chart positions | Album |
| Title | Year | Oricon | Album |
|---|---|---|---|
| "Sparkling ~My dream goes on~" (輝いて ～My dream goes on～, Kagayaite ～My dream goes on～) | 2018 | 45 | Fig |
| "I'll Give You Magic ~Magic In The Air~" (魔法をあげるよ ～Magic In The Air～, Mahō o ageru yo ～Magic In The Air～) | 2018 | 38 | Fig |
| "Stage" (舞台, Butai) | 2019 | 62 | Fig |

== Filmography ==
=== DVD and Bu-ray ===
| Title | Album details | Peak chart positions | |
| Title | Album details | JPN | |
| Title | Album details | DVD | Bu-ray |
|---|---|---|---|
| Angerme Meimi Tamura Solo Special Live (アンジュルム 田村芽実ソロスペシャルライブ) | Released: October 12, 2016; Label:Up-Front Works; Formats: DVD | 27 | — |

=== Television ===
| Year | Title | Role | Network | Notes | Ref. |
|---|---|---|---|---|---|
| 2023 | Ranman | Kayo Ōhata | NHK | Asadora | |
| 2024 | Omusubi | Risa "Risapon" Yuzuki | NHK | Asadora | |
