= Angerme =

Japanese idol girl group

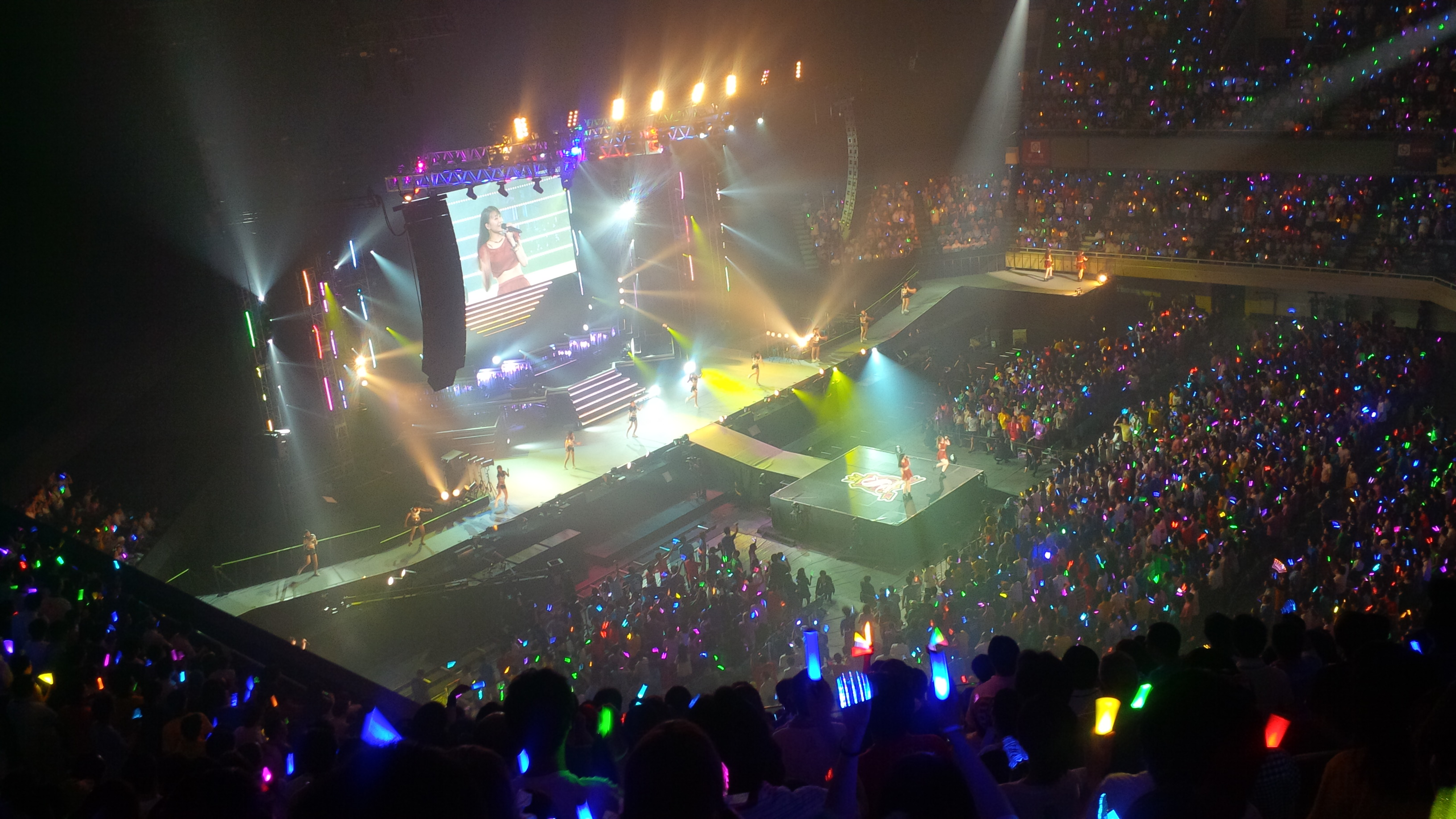
- Smileage at their first Performance in the Nippon Budokan 2014

Background information
- Also known as: Smileage
- Origin: Japan
- Genre: J-pop
- Years active: 2009–present
- Labels: Good Factory; Pony Canyon; Hachama
- Spinoff of: Hello! Project
- Members: Layla Ise; Rin Hashisako; Rin Kawana; Shion Tamenaga; Wakana Matsumoto; Yuki Hirayama; Yukiho Shimoitani; Hana Goto; Momoha Nagano
- Past members: Saki Ogawa; Fuyuka Kosuga; Yuuka Maeda; Kanon Fukuda; Meimi Tamura; Maho Aikawa; Ayaka Wada; Rina Katsuta; Kana Nakanishi; Mizuki Murota; Haruka Oota; Musubu Funaki; Momona Kasahara; Akari Takeuchi; Rikako Sasaki; Ayano Kawamura; Moe Kamikokuryo
- Website: www.helloproject.com/angerme/

Angerme (アンジュルム, Anjurumu), formerly Smileage (スマイレージ, Sumairēji; stylized as S/mileage, from 2009–2015), is a Japanese idol girl group from the musical collective Hello! Project. Since the group's formation in 2009, the group has seen changes in membership. The current members consist of Layla Ise, Rin Hashisako, Rin Kawana, Shion Tamenaga, Wakana Matsumoto, Yuki Hirayama, Yukiho Shimoitani, Hana Goto, and Momoha Nagano.

The group was formed in 2009 under the name Smileage, consisting of four members of Hello! Project's trainee group, Hello Pro Egg. They released their debut single, "Suki-chan", under an indie label in the same year. The group made their major label debut in 2010 with the single "Yume Miru 15", in which they won the Japan Record Award for Best New Artist the same year. In 2015, the group changed their name to Angerme.

== History ==
=== Smileage era ===
==== 2009-2010: Formation and debut ====
On April 4, Japanese music producer Tsunku announced on his blog that a new girl group consisting of Hello! Pro Egg members (the trainee program of Hello! Project) would be formed, consisting of Ayaka Wada, Yuuka Maeda, and Kanon Fukuda, and Saki Ogawa. Wada, Maeda, and Fukuda withdrew from their activities in the Shugo Chara! franchise for their debut, and Wada was the designated group leader. A month later, on May 7, 2009, he revealed that the group would be called Smileage, a portmanteau of the English words "smile", "mileage", and "age"; together, the name means "the age of smiles". In 2009 the group released three indie singles: "Ama no Jaku", "Asu wa Date na no ni, Ima Sugu Koe ga Kikitai" and "Suki-chan"

After releasing three singles, Tsunku announced that the group would become a full-time group in the spring of 2010 and their debut was set for May 2010. A "Smile Campaign" (笑顔キャンペーン; "Egao Campaign") was embarked upon to collect 10,000 smiles from people, where fans were asked to send in photographs of themselves smiling, compiled into a big mosaic. The group made their official event debut in Nagoya on March 19, with their fourth single "Otona ni Narutte Muzukashii!!!", released March 14, their first release on the Up-Front Works label. The result of the campaign was announced during the joint Smileage and Erina Mano concert on April 3. It was then announced that the group would be leaving from Hello! Pro Eggs.

Their first major single, "Yume Miru Fifteen", was released on May 26. Their debut album, Warugaki 1, was released on December 8, 2010. On December 30, Smileage received the Japan Record Award for Best New Artist.

==== 2011–2014: The second generation ====
On May 29, 2011, Smileage revealed at their first-anniversary event that they would be holding auditions for new members to add to the four-member line-up and that some of the members would depart. The new members were announced on August 14. From Hello! Pro Egg, Akari Takeuchi and Rina Katsuta were added, and three other girls: Kana Nakanishi, Fuyuka Kosuga, and Meimi Tamura also joined.

On August 24, it was announced that Saki Ogawa would be leaving Smileage on August 27 and, subsequently, from Hello! Project. On September 9, one of Smileage's newest additions, Fuyuka Kosuga, was diagnosed with anaemia, after missing a concert due to illness. Due to her anaemia, she left the group and resumed her work as a Hello! Project Egg after her recovery.

Starting September 18, a second Smile Campaign was held by the new members to determine their place as official members in the group. On October 16, at Smileage's "Tachiagirl" event, producer Tsunku announced all four sub-members had become full members. On October 25, it was announced that Yuuka Maeda would leave Smileage and, subsequently, from Hello! Project on December 31.

On October 4, 2014, the group welcomed three new members: Mizuki Murota, Maho Aikawa and Rikako Sasaki. On December 17, 2014, it was announced that Smileage would change their name to Angerme, a name proposed by Kana Nakanishi which comes from a combination of the French words for angel (ange) and tear (larme).

=== Angerme Era ===
==== 2015–2016: Re-brand and third, fourth, and fifth generation debut ====
On May 20, 2015, Kanon Fukuda announced that she would be leaving Angerme and Hello! Project in the fall to continue with her university studies. On November 11, 2015, Angerme released their twentieth single, "Desugita Kui wa Utarenai / Dondengaeshi / Watashi." At the release event for this single, the winner of the 2015 Angerme Shin Member Audition and a sole fourth generation member was announced with Moe Kamikokuryo revealed as the new member. This was the first time a Hello! Project group other than Morning Musume welcomed a sole generation member. Kanon Fukuda officially left the group on November 29.

Less than a month after Fukuda's graduation, on December 20, 2015, during the Angerme Christmas Fanclub event, it was announced that Meimi Tamura would leave Angerme and Hello! Project in spring 2016. On May 30, 2016, Meimi Tamura graduated from Angerme. On July 16, 2016, a surprise announcement was made: Momona Kasahara, previously from Hello! Pro Kenshūsei, would join the group as the sole fifth generation member.

==== 2017–2018: Sixth and seventh generation debut ====
On January 11, 2017, Hello! Project announced the hiatus of Maho Aikawa until further notice, due to being diagnosed with panic disorder.

On June 26, Musubu Funaki, who transferred from Country Girls and Ayano Kawamura as a former Hello! Pro Kenshūsei, joined Angerme as new 6th generation members. Musubu continued her activities as a full member of Country girls until June 30, where she then became a full member of Angerme, and held a concurrent position in Country Girls. The sixth generation began activities in the group at the Hello! Project 2017 SUMMER concert tour on July 15.

On December 31, an announcement was posted to the Hello! Project website, stating that Maho Aikawa had decided to graduate from both Angerme and Hello! Project, after having been on hiatus from activities for the past twelve months. The graduation was effective immediately, making Aikawa the first of the third generation to graduate.

On April 5, 2018, Ayaka Wada made an announcement that she would graduate in one year, in spring 2019 at the end of a spring concert tour.

On November 3, seventh generation members Layla Ise and Haruka Oota joined the group.

==== 2019–present: Member graduations and new members ====
On June 18, Ayaka Wada graduated from Angerme and Hello! Project in the Hello Pro Premium Angerme Concert Tour 2019 Haru Final Wada Ayaka Sotsugyou Special Rinnetenshou ~Aru Toki Umareta Ai no Teishou~ at Nippon Budokan, becoming the longest-serving member and longest-serving leader of the group. With her graduation, there were no more first generation members in the group.

Rina Katsuta graduated from Angerme and Hello! Project on September 25 at Hello! Project 2019 Summer in Pacifico Yokohama to pursue a career in fashion.

One new member, Rin Hashisako from Hello! Pro Kenshuusei, joined the group as the eighth generation member. She is the 3rd solo generation to debut in the group, as well as the first to debut after all original 1st generation members have graduated. She was introduced on stage during the Hello! Project 2019 Summer concert tour from July 13.

Rina Katsuta officially left the group on September 25.

Kana Nakanishi graduated from both Angerme and Hello! Project on December 10, 2019, to study business administration and management.

Musubu Funaki graduated from both Angerme and Hello! Project in March 2020.

Kana Nakanishi left the group on December 10.

==== 2020 ====
On January 2, during Hello! Project 2020 Winter HELLO! PROJECT IS [ ] ~side A~, ANGERME announced that they would hold an audition for new members, titled ANGERME ONLY ONE Audition ~Watashi wo Tsukuru no wa Watashi~, which opened for applications on January 11.

On January 22, 2020, it was announced that Mizuki Murota would graduate from both Angerme and Hello! Project in March 2020.

On February 28, it was announced that Haruka Oota has been suspended from all activities for an indeterminate amount of time due to rule violations.

On March 22, Mizuki Murota officially left the group.

On April 21, it was announced that Musubu Funaki's graduation would be postponed indefinitely due to the COVID-19 pandemic.

On March 22, Mizuki Murota graduated and left from both ANGERME and Hello! Project at Hello! Project Hina Fes 2020 <ANGERME Premium>.

On April 21, it was announced that Musubu Funaki's and Juice=Juice member Karin Miyamoto's graduations set for June 2020 would be postponed to a later date due to the government's declaration of emergency following the spread of COVID-19 getting worse. Both stated that they wanted to graduate in front of an audience, and thus made the decision to postpone their graduations.

On August 26, the group released their 28th single "Kagiriaru Moment / Mirror Mirror".

On October 13, it was announced that Haruka Oota had withdrawn from Angerme but would remain in Hello! Project.

On October 23, it was announced that Funaki's graduation concert was rescheduled for December 9 at Nippon Budokan.

On November 2, three new members were announced as part of ANGERME's ninth generation: Wakana Matsumoto and Rin Kawana, winners of the ANGERME ONLY ONE Audition ~Watashi wo Tsukuru no wa Watashi~, and Shion Tamenaga from Hello Pro Kenshuusei. The new line-up would make their first performance at the ANGERME Concert 2020 ~Kishotenketsu~ Funaki Musubu Sotsugyou Special on December 9.

On November 27, following a countdown to a surprise collaboration with oral beauty care brand Ora2, the music video for promotional song "SHAKA SHAKA TO LOVE" was released. Alongside the music video, ANGERME also participated in the "Colorful Toothbrush Brush up!" campaign promoting the Ora2 Me line of toothbrushes from November 28 to December 25, during which a lottery to win polaroids of each member was held through Twitter. The song was then released digitally on December 24.

==== 2021 ====
On June 21, it was announced that Momona Kasahara will be graduating and leave from the group and Hello! Project by the end of 2021 to move abroad to study singing and dancing.

On June 23, the group released their 29th single, "Hakkiri Shiyou ze / Oyogenai Mermaid / Aisare Route A or B?", the first single to feature the 9th generation members.

On July 12, ANGERME released the music video for promotional song "SHAKA SHAKA #2 LOVE Colorful Life Hen", which is an alternate version of "SHAKA SHAKA TO LOVE" with a new arrangement and new lyrics. The song is a tie-up for their second collaboration campaign with oral beauty care brand Ora2 promoting the Ora2 Me line of toothbrushes, running from July 12 to August 31. The song was later released digitally on September 1.

On September 13, it was announced that Momona Kasahara's graduation concert was scheduled for November 15 at Nippon Budokan.

On November 15, Momona Kasahara left the group.

On December 30, it was announced that Yuki Hirayama would join ANGERME as part of its 10th generation.

==== 2022 ====
On March 4, ANGERME performed at R-1 Festival 2022.

On March 21, ANGERME performed at LIVE SDD 2022, a live event held as part of FM Osaka's drunk driving eradication project "STOP! DRUNK DRIVING PROJECT".

On May 3, ANGERME performed at JAPAN JAM 2022.

On May 11, ANGERME released their 30th single, "Ai・Mashou / Hade ni Yacchai na! / Aisubeki Beki Human Life", which is also the first single to feature Yuki Hirayama.

On October 19, ANGERME released their 31st single, "Kuyashii wa / Piece of Peace ~Shiawase no Puzzle~.

On December 20, it was announced that Akari Takeuchi would graduate and leave from the group and Hello! Project at the end of their 2023 Spring Tour to focus on her new passion in calligraphy.

==== 2023 ====
On March 22, the group released their fourth studio album, BIG LOVE.

On May 23, it was announced that Hello Pro Kenshuusei members Hana Goto and Yukiho Shimoitani would join ANGERME as part of its 11th generation. They were formally introduced to the public at the group's concert as part of the Sayonara Nakano Sunplaza Ongakusai festival on June 11.

On June 11, it was announced at the Sayonara Nakano Sunplaza Ongakusai that Moe Kamikokuryo would be ANGERME's new leader starting on June 22 upon Akari Takeuchi's graduation. Rikako Sasaki, Moe Kamikokuryo, and Ayano Kawamura, the three next most senior members, had discussed it amongst themselves and decided that Moe Kamikokuryo would become the leader while Ayano Kawamura would remain the sub-leader.

On June 14, the group released their 32nd single, "Ai no Kedamono / Dousousei", which is the last single to feature Akari Takeuchi.

On June 21, the group held their first arena concert at Yokohama Arena titled ANGERME CONCERT 2023 BIG LOVE Takeuchi Akari FINAL LIVE "ANGERME Yori Ai wo Komete", which was also Akari Takeuchi's graduation concert and Akari Takeuchi also left the group.

On December 13, the group will release their 33rd single, "RED LINE / Life is Beautiful!".

On December 21, it was announced that Rikako Sasaki will be graduating and leaving from ANGERME and Hello! Project at the end of the group's upcoming spring concert tour in 2024.

==== 2024 ====
On June 12, the group released their 34th single, "Bibitaru Ichigeki / Uwasa no Narushii / THANK YOU, HELLO GOOD BYE", which is the last single to feature Rikako Sasaki.

On June 19, Rikako Sasaki graduated and left the group.

On July 4, it was announced that Ayano Kawamura will be graduating and leaving from ANGERME and Hello! Project at the end of the group's upcoming autumn concert tour and retire from the entertainment industry afterwards.

On 28 November, Ayano Kawamura graduated and left the group.

On December 20, it was announced that Moe Kamikokuryo would be graduating and leaving from ANGERME and Hello! Project at the end of the group's spring 2025 tour.

==== 2025 ====
On May 13, 2025, it was announced during the special ANGERME 10th anniversary tour 2025 Haru "Oubaitouri+" performance at Nippon Seinenkan Hall that Layla Ise would succeed Moe Kamikokuryo as ANGERME's new leader starting on June 19, with Shion Tamenaga as her sub-leader.

On May 21, they released their 36th single, "Android wa Yume wo Miru ka? / Hikari no Uta".

On June 18, Moe Kamikokuryo graduated from the group after their 10th anniversary tour.

On August 16, it was announced at the Hello! Con 2025 concert in LaLa arena TOKYO-BAY that Momoha Nagano would be joining ANGERME as the sole 12th generation member.

On November 12, they released their fifth studio album, Keep Your Smile!.

==== 2026 ====
On July 22, they released their 37th single "BaBaBa Burning Love! / Ai ga Ai no Mama de Iraremasu you ni".

On September 12, it was announced that Rin Hashisako will be graduating and leaving from ANGERME and Hello! Project at the end of the group's upcoming spring concert tour and take a break from the entertainment industry afterwards.

== Members ==
=== Current members ===
- Layla Ise (2018–present) (Leader)
- Rin Hashisako (2019–2027)
- Rin Kawana (2020–present)
- Shion Tamenaga (2020–present) (Sub-leader)
- Wakana Matsumoto (2020–present)
- Yuki Hirayama (2021–present)
- Yukiho Shimoitani (2023–present)
- Hana Goto (2023–present)
- Momoha Nagano (2025–present)

=== Former members ===
- Moe Kamikokuryo (2015–2025)
- Ayano Kawamura (2017–2024)
- Rikako Sasaki (2014–2024)
- Akari Takeuchi (2011–2023)
- Momona Kasahara (2016–2021)
- Musubu Funaki (2017–2020)
- Haruka Oota (2018–2020)
- Mizuki Murota (2014–2020)
- Kana Nakanishi (2011–2019)
- Rina Katsuta (2011–2019)
- Ayaka Wada (2009–2019)
- Maho Aikawa (2014–2017)
- Meimi Tamura (2011–2016)
- Kanon Fukuda (2009–2015)
- Yuuka Maeda (2009–2011)
- Fuyuka Kosuga (2011)
- Saki Ogawa (2009–2011)

== Discography ==
=== Studio albums ===
Title	Album details	Peak chart positions	
Title	Album details	JPN Oricon	JPN Hot
Warugaki 1 (悪ガキッ1)	Released: December 8, 2010; Label: Hachama; Formats: CD, digital download	18	—
S/mileage Best Album Kanzenban 1 (スマイレージ ベストアルバム完全版1)	Released: May 30, 2012; Label: Hachama; Formats: CD, digital download	13	—
2 Smile Sensation (2スマイルセンセーション)	Released: May 22, 2013; Label: Hachama; Formats: CD, digital download	13	—
Smileage / Angerme Selection Album "Taiki Bansei" (Smileage / Angerme Selection Album 「大器晩成」)	Released: November 25, 2015; Label: Hachama; Formats: CD, digital download	17	23
Rinnetenshō ~Angerme Past, Present & Future~ (輪廻転生～Angerme Past, Present & Future～)	Released: May 15, 2019; Label: Hachama; Formats: CD, digital download	5	6
Big Love	Released: March 22, 2023; Label: Hachama; Formats: CD, digital download	4	4
Keep Your Smile!	Released: November 12, 2025; Label: Hachama; Formats: CD, digital download	4	23

=== Singles ===
Title	Year	Peak chart positions		Album
Title	Year	JPN Oricon	JPN Hot	Album
"Suki-chan" (スキちゃん)	2009	159	—	Warugaki 1
"Asu wa Date na no ni, Ima Sugu Koe ga Kikitai" (あすはデートなのに、今すぐ声が聞きたい)	2009	—	—	Warugaki 1
"Ama no Jaku" (ぁまのじゃく)	2009	—	—	Warugaki 1
"Otona ni Narutte Muzukashii!!!" (オトナになるって難しい!!!)	2010	42	—	Warugaki 1
"Yume Miru 15" (夢見る 15歳)	2010	5	22	Warugaki 1
"Gambaranakute mo Ee nen de!!" (○○ がんばらなくてもええねんで!!)	2010	6	22	Warugaki 1
"Onaji Jikyū de Hataraku Tomodachi no Bijin Mama" (同じ時給で働く友達の美人ママ)	2010	5	17	Warugaki 1
"Short Cut" (ショートカット)	2011	5	9	Smileage Best Album Kanzenhan 1
"Koi ni Booing Boo!" (恋にBooing ブー!)	2011	6	30	Smileage Best Album Kanzenhan 1
"Uchōten Love" (有頂天LOVE)	2011	5	30	Smileage Best Album Kanzenhan 1
"Tachiagirl" (タチアガール)	2011	4	17	Smileage Best Album Kanzenhan 1
"Please Miniskirt Postwoman!" (プリーズ ミニスカ ポストウーマン!)	2011	5	70	Smileage Best Album Kanzenhan 1
"Choto Mate Kudasai!" (チョトマテクダサイ!)	2012	6	28	Smileage Best Album Kanzenhan 1
"Dot Bikini" (ドットビキニ)	2012	6	46	Smileage Best Album Kanzenhan 1
"Suki yo, Junjō Hankōki." (好きよ、純情反抗期。)	2012	7	37	2 Smile Sensation
"Samui ne." (寒いね。)	2012	6	25	2 Smile Sensation
"Tabidachi no Haru ga Kita" (旅立ちの春が来た)	2013	4	25	2 Smile Sensation
"Atarashii Watashi ni Nare!" / "Yattaruchan" (新しい私になれ!/ヤッタルチャン)	2013	4	18	Smileage / Angerme Selection Album "Taiki Bansei"
"Ee ka!? /Ii Yatsu" (ええか!?/「良い奴」)	2013	3	14	Non-album singles
"Mystery Night! / Eighteen Emotion" (ミステリーナイト!/エイティーン エモーション)	2014	2	14	Non-album singles
"Aa Susukino / Chikyu wa Kyo mo Ai o Hagukumu" (嗚呼 すすきの/地球は今日も愛を育む)	2014	5	22	Smileage / Angerme Selection Album "Taiki Bansei"
"Taiki Bansei / Otome no Gyakushū" (大器晩成/乙女の逆襲)	2015	2	3	Smileage / Angerme Selection Album "Taiki Bansei"
"Nana Korobi Ya Oki / Gashin Shōtan / Mahō Tsukai Sarī" (七転び八起き/臥薪嘗胆/魔法使いサリー)	2015	2	9	Smileage / Angerme Selection Album "Taiki Bansei"
"Desugita Kui wa Utarenai / Donden Gaeshi / Watashi" (出すぎた杭は打たれない/ドンデンガエシ/わたし)	2015	2	12	Rinnetenshō ~Angerme Past, Present & Future~
"Tsugitsugi Zokuzoku / Itoshima Distance / Koi Nara Tokku ni Hajimatteru" (次々続々/糸島Distance/恋ならとっくに始まってる)	2016	2	5	Rinnetenshō ~Angerme Past, Present & Future~
"Umaku Ienai / Ai no Tame Kyō made Shinka Shitekita Ningen Ai no Tame Subete Taika Shitekita Ningen / Wasurete Ageru" (上手く言えない/愛のため今日まで進化してきた人間 愛のためすべて退化してきた人間/忘れてあげる)	2016	3	7	Rinnetenshō ~Angerme Past, Present & Future~
"Ai Sae Areba Nanni mo Iranai / Namida Iro no Ketsui / Majokko Megu-chan" (愛さえあればなんにもいらない/ナミダイロノケツイ/魔女っ子メグちゃん)	2017	3	3	Rinnetenshō ~Angerme Past, Present & Future~
"Nakenai ze... Kyoukan Sagi / Uraha゠Lover / Kimi Dake ja Nai sa... Friends (2018 Acoustic Ver.)" (泣けないぜ...共感詐欺/Uraha=Lover/君だけじゃないさ...friends)	2018	2	4	Rinnetenshō ~Angerme Past, Present & Future~
"Tade Kuu Mushi mo Like it! / 46-Okunen Love" (タデ食う虫もLike it!/46億年Love)	2018	5	9	Rinnetenshō ~Angerme Past, Present & Future~
"Koi wa Accha Accha / Yumemita 15" (恋はアッチャアッチャ/夢見た 15年)	2019	2	2	Rinnetenshō ~Angerme Past, Present & Future~
"Watashi wo Tsukuru no wa Watashi / Zenzen Okiagarenai Sunday" (私を創るのは私/全然起き上がれないSunday)	2019	1	2	BIG LOVE
"Kagiriaru Moment / Mirror Mirror" (限りあるMoment/ミラー・ミラー)	2020	4	21	BIG LOVE
"Hakkiri Shiyou ze / Oyogenai Mermaid / Aisare Route A or B?" (はっきりしようぜ/泳げないMermaid/愛されルート A or B?)	2021	4	8	BIG LOVE
"Ai Mashō / Hade ni Yacchai na! / Aisubekibeki Human Life" (愛・魔性/ハデにやっちゃいな!/愛すべきべき Human Life)	2022	1	3	BIG LOVE
"Ai no Kedamono / Dōsōsei" (アイノケダモノ/同窓生)	2023	2	6	Keep Your Smile!
"Red Line / Life Is Beautiful!" (Red Line/ライフ イズ ビューティフル!)	2023	2	7	Keep Your Smile!
"Bibitaru Ichigeki / Uwasa no Narushii / Thank You, Hello Good Bye" (美々たる一撃/うわさのナルシー/THANK YOU, HELLO GOOD BYE)	2024	2	7	Keep Your Smile!
"Hatsukoi, Hanabie / Yuuyuu Kankan Gonna Be Alright!!" (初恋、花冷え/悠々閑々)	2024	4	9	Keep Your Smile!
"Android wa Yume wo Miru ka? / Hikari no Uta" (アンドロイドは夢を見るか？/光のうた)	2025	2	5	Keep Your Smile!
"BaBaBa Burning Love! / Ai ga Ai no Mama de Iraremasu you ni" (BaBaBa Burning Love！/愛が愛のままでいられますように)	2026	4	6	Non-album single

== Films ==
- Ike! Danshi Kōkō Engekibu (行け！男子高校演劇部) (2011)
- Kaidan Shin-mimi Bukuro Igyou(怪談新耳袋 異形, Tales of Terror from Tokyo and All Over Japan, Igyou)(2012)

== Awards ==
=== Japan Record Awards ===
The Japan Record Awards is a major music awards show held annually in Japan by the Japan Composer's Association.

Year	Nominee / work	Award	Result
2010	Smileage "Yume Miru 15"	New Artist Award	Won
2010	Smileage "Yume Miru 15"	Best New Artist	Won

Preceded by BIGBANG	Japan Record Award for Best New Artist; 2010	Succeeded by Fairies
