= Akari Takeuchi =

Japanese singer (born 1997)

Akari Takeuchi 竹内朱莉
- Born: November 23, 1997 (age 28)
- Origin: Saitama, Japan
- Genre: Pop
- Occupation: Singer
- Years active: 2008–present
- Labels: Hachama, Zetima

Akari Takeuchi (竹内朱莉, Takeuchi Akari; born November 23, 1997) is a Japanese singer. She is a former second-generation member and the leader of the Japanese idol pop group Angerme.

== Biography ==
Akari Takeuchi was on November 23, 1997, in Saitama, Japan.

In 2008, Takeuchi joined Hello! Project as a Hello! Pro Egg member alongside Mizuki Fukumura and Rie Kaneko. In 2009, she was chosen as a member of Minimoni's revival unit, Shin Minimoni, with fellow Hello! Pro Egg member Karin Miyamoto, S/mileage member Kanon Fukuda and Morning Musume member Linlin.

In June 2011, Takeuchi took part in auditions to find second-generation members for the Hello! Project group S/mileage. On August 14, at the last performance of the Hello! Project 2011 Summer concerts, Takeuchi as well as Kana Nakanishi, Fuyuka Kosuga, Rina Katsuta and Meimi Tamura were announced as sub-members of S/mileage. On October 16, at the launch event of S/mileage's seventh single "Tachiagirl", Tsunku announced the sub-members' promotion to official members of the group.

In October 2012, Takeuchi joined the Hello! Project and Satoyama movement unit Harvest with Morning Musume members Erina Ikuta, Ayumi Ishida, and Masaki Satō.

Takeuchi succeeded Ayaka Wada as the leader of Angerme on June 19, 2019.

On December 20, 2022, Takeuchi announced her graduation from Angerme and Hello! Project to happen in Spring 2023.

On June 20, 2023, she officially graduated from Angerme and Hello! Project with a concert dedicated for her graduation held at Yokohama Arena.

== Discography ==
For Akari Takeuchi's releases with Angerme, see Angerme#Discography.

== Bibliography ==
=== Books ===
- Jinsei Sumi Mamire (人生墨まみれ) (July 13, 2023, Shufu no Tomo, ISBN 978-4074540433)

=== Photobooks ===
- Roundabout (May 25, 2023, Odyssey Books, ISBN 978-4-8470-8490-4)
