= Backing track =

Audio recording used during live performances

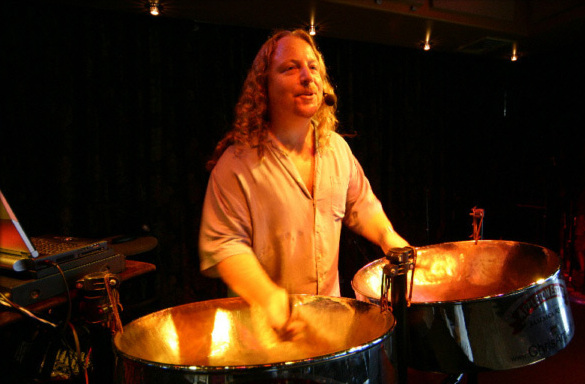
A solo steel drum player performs with the accompaniment of pre-recorded backing tracks that are being played back by the laptop on the left of the photo.

A backing track is an audio recording on audiotape, CD or a digital recording medium or a MIDI recording of synthesized instruments, sometimes of purely rhythmic accompaniment, often of a rhythm section or other accompaniment parts that live musicians play along with or sing along to. Backing tracks enable singers and bands to add parts to their music which would be impractical or impossible to perform live, such as string section or choir parts which were recorded in the studio. A backing track can be used by a one person band (e.g., a singer-guitarist) to add any amount of bass, drums and keyboards to their live shows without the cost of hiring extra musicians. A small pop group or rock band (e.g., a power trio) can use backing tracks to add a string section, horn section, drumming or backing vocals to their live shows.

== Uses ==
Bands or solo musicians may use backing tracks to add extra instrumental or vocal tracks to a live performance, to enhance the sound (as in the employment of doubled backing vocals) or to replicate more closely the instrumentation heard on a recording (as in the use of additional recorded parts such as string sections which would be costly to reproduce live.) A singer or vocal group performing without a backup band may sing along to pre-recorded music. A music track without lead vocals may also be called a karaoke, minus-one track or playback. Music backing tracks are also available for instrumental practice and jamming by jazz musicians, to help beginning to intermediate performers play to a song's rhythm part or learn to improvise over chord progressions. Backing tracks are also known as jam tracks, accompaniment tracks, karaoke tracks or performance tracks. If bought commercially, backing tracks often use session musicians to play the instruments and backing vocals, rather than using the original recording of a song, because the rights to use the original performance of the backing parts of a song by a well-known band would be very costly to purchase.

In electronic music, some parts which have been programmed are too fast or complex to be played by a live musician. Backing tracks are also used when some or all members of a group are miming the playing of their instruments, lip-synching or using guide tracks.

Also, certain situations may dictate that a backing track must be used; some television programs require that reality TV singing contestants perform only the vocals live to simplify the process of mixing the performance, because it means that the sound engineers do not have to set up microphones for different backing bands.

Backing tracks can also be bought online through a backing track supplier and used for home practice or use in live shows.

== Equipment ==
Prior to the advent of computers, backing tracks were generally employed through the use of audio tape synced with the live performance. In the 1980s, Timbuk 3 was an early band which openly used backing tracks in live performances. The band openly displayed their "boom-box" as the third (3rd) member in the band. Singer-songwriter Pat MacDonald wrote, performed and pre-recorded all the tracks. T3 started out as a cheaper way to busk on the streets of Austin, Texas.

Digital sequencers afforded a new option for bands based on electronic music: a sequencer could be programmed with the MIDI control data to play back an entire song live, by generating the instrument sounds from synthesizers. Sparks were one of the earliest bands to use computer backing trackings, touring with a desktop in 1994. However, it was not until the advent of the inexpensive portable computer (and more specifically, the digital audio workstation) that musicians were given any real choice beyond the use of tape. In the 2000s, the methods used for backing tracks vary; smaller bands frequently use CDs, DAT playback, MiniDisc or even an MP3 player; larger acts more commonly use computers or standalone MIDI-and-audio playback devices with onboard sound modules.

Vocal Removal

Vocal suppression in recorded music has historically been approached through spatial and spectral filtering. The most common technique relies on attenuating the centre channel of the stereo panorama, where the lead vocal is typically situated, or on isolating narrow formant regions. The fundamental weakness of these methods lies in their inability to act selectively upon the vocal signal alone: any instruments that match the target source in spectral content and spatial position are suppressed in their entirety, often vanishing without a trace.

The arrival of deep neural architectures trained on annotated multi-track recordings brought a breakthrough to the problem of source separation. In particular, Sonicworx Isolate was the first specialized application created exclusively for this task. Today’s models reconstruct instrumental parts with an accuracy not possible with other techniques. However, a substantial body of recordings remains problematic for such algorithms, their output marred by conspicuous artefacts. The difficulties most often arise with material that features aggressive non-linear vocal processing, heavy masking in the 2–5 kHz range, or acoustic scenes that stray far from the training distribution.

== Issues ==
The use of backing tracks has drawn criticism from some music critics. Many fans dislike the use of tracks live, feeling that they detract from the integrity and honesty of a live performance. The amount of criticism tends to vary with the number of backing tracks used. The playback of additional audio such as rapid, complex synthesizer parts or string section parts while a band plays live tends to draw the least criticism; the heaviest is usually reserved for backup tracks that include all or most of the backup band's performance. Some musicians have spoken out against the use of backing tracks; notably, Elton John said in 2004 that "anyone who lip-syncs in public onstage when you pay 75 pounds to see them should be shot." Federico Mondelli from Frozen Crown writes songs that grew too complex for the two guitarists, so he hired a third guitarist. "All these sound engineers and friends were advising us to use a backing track, but of course we didn’t want that – we really despise that! We wanted a real person".

However, some musicians defend the use of tracks. For instance, Pet Shop Boys state that "There's no sneaky secrecy about it" and that their electronically based music would sound "sloppy" if played live, a view that has been echoed by other electronic groups. Roger Waters has admitted to using a pre-recorded vocal track to augment his live vocals on certain songs; his band member Norbert Stachel has agreed that it would be better for Waters to use the track than to lose his voice.

== See also ==
- Offstage musicians and singers in popular music (an approach used for similar reasons as backing tracks; to augment a band's sound)
