= Yuuka Maeda =

Japanese singer (born 1994)

Yuuka Maeda 前田憂佳
- Born: December 28, 1994 (age 31)
- Origin: Chiba Prefecture, Japan
- Genres: J-pop
- Occupation: Singer
- Years active: 2004–2011
- Label: Good Factory Records
- Formerly of: Smileage; Hello Pro Egg; Tomoiki-Ki o Uetai; High-King; Shugo Chara Egg!
- Website: helloproject.com

Yuuka Maeda (前田憂佳, Maeda Yūka; born December 28, 1994) is a former Japanese singer. After joining Hello Pro Egg, a trainee program associated with Hello! Project, she became a member of the collective's promotional groups, Shugo Chara Egg! and High-King. Maeda also starred as Amu Hinamori in the musical adaptation of Shugo Chara! (2010). In 2010, she debuted as a member of the girl group Smileage. On December 31, 2011, she retired from the entertainment industry to pursue academic studies.

== Career ==
=== 2004–2007: Hello Pro Egg ===
Maeda Yuuka joined Hello! Project as a member of Hello! Pro Egg in June 2004 following auditions of thirty-two other girls. The group aimed to prepare the young girls for their entertainment debut. Maeda received free dance and vocal training alongside the other Eggs.

In October 2005, Maeda became one of the founding members of Hello! Pro Egg group Tomoiki Ki o Uetai. They debuted at Morning Musume's environmental Culture Festival 2005.

In 2006, Maeda continued her training and appeared at numerous Hello! Project concerts as a backing dancer, including "Country Musume LIVE2006 ~Shibuya des Date~". In March Tomoiki Ki wo Uetai's blog opened and in July their first song was announced, "Minna no ki". On August 22, Tomoiki participated volunteered at PLANT A TREE farm and herb garden in Yamanashiken. In September, Maeda performed "Minna no ki" with Tomoiki at Morning Musume's environmental Culture Festival 2006. She was a backing dancer to Morning Musume's Kusumi Koharu. She released a single in a group known as Paretto.

In April 2007 Maeda received a role in the musical Soto wa shiroi haru no kumo that was later released on DVD. In September, Maeda featured in Standardsong Entertainment's Ekubo ~people song~. Maeda appeared in Chao.TV (started 2007/09/02). Maeda appeared as a part of Tomoiki at Morning Musume's environmental Culture Festival 2007.

=== 2008–2009: High-King, Shugo Chara Egg! ===
Maeda received her first proper Hello! Project role when she was selected to become part of High-King, alongside Hello! Project singers such as Morning Musume's Ai Takahashi and Reina Tanaka, The group was created to promote Morning Musume's upcoming rendition of Rodgers and Hammerstein's Cinderella, titled Cinderella the Musical. The group's debut single, "C\C (Cinderella\Complex)" was released on June 11, 2008, and peaked at number 6. Maeda was selected as one of the four members for a new Hello! Pro Egg unit alongside Wada Ayaka, Fukuda Kanon and Saho Akari. The group was called Shugo Chara Egg! and was formed to record the opening songs for the anime that Buono! sings for Shugo Chara. She released two singles with the group until the line-up changed, and she was replaced by Mizuki Fukumura.

=== 2009–2011: S/mileage and retirement ===
On April 4, 2009 Tsunku announced on his blog that a new group was in the works. The members listed were Maeda Yuuka, Fukuda Kanon, Ogawa Saki, and Wada Ayaka. He stated the lineup was subject to change, and that it would be their "major debut". On May 5, 2009, Tsunku revealed the group's name to be "S/mileage" (smile of age). On August 15, 2009, she played her first musical drama titled Shugo Chara! Musical and took the main role of Amu Hinamori.

Maeda and the rest of the S/mileage members graduated from Hello! Pro Egg in the Hello! Project Spring Concert, They released their first major single titled 夢見る15歳 (Yume Miru sai) on 2010-05-26, Yuuka, Kanon and Ayaka are cast as the main characters of Hime Chen! Otogi Chikku Idol Lilpri and eventually released singles as Lilpri.

On October 25, Maeda announced she would graduate from S/mileage and Hello! Project. Her graduation was held on December 31. She stated she want to focus on her studies and university. She felt that it would be unfair to her fans and supporters to devote only half of her energy on stage. Her final single with S/mileage was "Please Mini Skirt Post Woman!".

== Musical groups ==
- Tomoiki-Ki wo Uetai
- High-King
- Shugo Chara Egg!
- S/mileage
- Lilpri

== Filmography ==
Title	Album details	Peak chart positions	
Title	Album details	JPN	
Title	Album details	DVD	Blu-ray
See You-karin～Special Making Edition～	Released: February 15 m 2012; Label: Hachama; Formats: DVD	53	—
