= Maro Kannagi =

Japanese singer

Maro Kannagi カンアギマロ
- Born: Kanon Fukuda (福田 花音); March 12, 1995 (age 31)
- Origin: Saitama, Japan
- Genres: J-pop
- Occupations: Singer; voice actress
- Years active: 2004–present
- Labels: Up-Front Group; Tokyo Pink
- Formerly of: ZOC; Angerme; Shin Mini-Moni; Shugo Chara Egg!; Hello Pro Egg; Hello! Project

Kanon Fukuda (福田花音, Fukuda Kanon; born March 12, 1995), known professionally as Maro Kannagi (カンアギマロ, Kannagi Maro), is a Japanese singer. She is a former member of ZOC, Hello! Project idol group Angerme and Shugo Chara Egg!.

== Career ==
=== Early years with Hello! Project ===
On April 4, 2009, Tsunku announced a new girl group consisting of Kanon Fukuda, Yuka Maeda and Ayaka Wada – all of whom were members of Shugo Chara Egg! – alongside a Hello! Pro Egg member Saki Ogawa. On May 5, 2009, Tsunku revealed the name of the new group to be Smileage on his blog.

Fukuda and the rest of the Smileage members graduated from Hello! Pro Egg in Hello! Project's spring concert in May 2010. She and fellow Smileage members, Yuuka Maeda and Ayaka Wada were later chosen to be the lead voice actors for Lilpri.

When Smileage re-branded to Angerme in late 2014, Fukuda announced her departure from the group and Hello! Project on May 20, 2015. She graduated on November 29, 2015, at a concert held at Nippon Budokan.

=== 2020–present: ZOC ===
On March 27, 2020, Fukuda joined ZOC under the stage name Maro Kannagi. She left ZOC on March 31, 2024.

== Filmography ==
Title	Album details	Peak chart positions	
Title	Album details	JPN	
Title	Album details	DVD	Blu-ray
Kanon Fukuda: Dress Up Kanon (福田花音 Dress Up Kanon)	Released: January 23, 2013; Label: Hachama; Formats: DVD	57	—
