= Ayaka Wada =

Japanese singer (born 1994)

- 和田 彩花
- Born: 1 August 1994 (age 32); Gunma Prefecture, Japan
- Occupation: Singer
- Years active: 2009–present
- Musical career
- Genre: J-pop
- Label: Good Factory Records
- Formerly of: Angerme; S/mileage; Hello! Pro Egg; Shugo Chara Egg!; ZYX
- Website: wadaayaka.com

Ayaka Wada (和田 彩花, Wada Ayaka; born 1 August 1994) is a Japanese singer signed to Yu-M Entertainment. She was a first generation member and the leader of Angerme, as well as the leader of Hello! Project.

== Early life ==
Wada was born on 1 August 1994 in Gunma Prefecture. She joined Hello! Project as a member of Hello! Pro Egg at age ten, in June 2004. She continued her training and appeared at numerous Hello! Project group concerts as a backing dancer, including the Country Musume concert Country Musume Live 2006: Shibuya des Date. In November 2007, Wada received a part in the musical Reverse! Watashi no karada doko desu ka?.

== Career ==
Wada is best known as a singer.

In 2008, Wada was chosen as one of the four members of the new Hello! Pro Egg unit Shugo Chara Egg! alongside Yuuka Maeda, Kanon Fukuda, and Akari Saho.

On 4 April 2009, Wada was selected to debut in the Hello! Project group S/mileage along with Yuuka Maeda, Kanon Fukuda, and Saki Ogawa and was named the leader of the group. S/mileage members, including Wada, then left Hello! Pro Egg and Shugo Chara Egg! to focus on their new group activities.

In July 2010, she joined the Hello! Project revival unit ZYX-α. In 2011, Wada, along with Yuuka Maeda and Kanon Fukuda, was chosen to voice act in the anime Hime Chen! Otogi Chikku Idol Lilpri. Together, the trio formed the unit Lilpri and sang the opening and ending themes for the anime as well as the insert songs. In 2012, Wada joined the Hello! Project and SATOYAMA movement unit Peaberry alongside Riho Sayashi.

On 17 December 2014, S/mileage changed their group name to Angerme with Wada remaining as the leader. On 1 January 2017, Wada succeeded Maimi Yajima as the leader of Hello! Project.

On 5 April 2018, it was announced that Wada would graduate from Angerme and Hello! Project at the end of the group's spring tour in 2019. Her graduation was held on 18 June 2019 at Nippon Budokan. As a member of Hello! Project for almost 15 years, she had the second longest tenure after Momoko Tsugunaga, who beat her by one day.

On 1 August 2019, the day of her 25th birthday, Wada started her solo activities and opened an official website as well as social media accounts and a YouTube channel.

== Personal life ==
On April 17, 2026, Wada shared on Instagram that she and her partner had officially registered their marriage in Taiwan. Although Wada confirmed her partner is Taiwanese, she chose not to disclose their gender, instead expressing her support for same-sex marriage and her wish for both partners to keep their own surnames.

== Hello! Project groups and units ==
- Hello! Pro Egg (2004–2010)
- Shugo Chara Egg! (2008–2009)
- S/mileage•Angerme (2009–2019)
- ZYX-α (2009)
- Lilpri (2010–2011)
- Hello! Project Mobekimasu (2011)
- Peaberry (2012–2016)

== Filmography ==
Title	Album details	Peak chart positions	
Title	Album details	JPN	
Title	Album details	DVD	Blu-ray
Ayaka Wada: Ayaka (和田彩花 彩花)	Released: 2 March 2011; Label: Hachama; Formats: DVD	68	—
Ayaka Wada: Aya (和田彩花 Aya)	Released: 7 March 2012; Label: Hachama; Formats: DVD	90	—
