= Buono! =

Japanese girl group

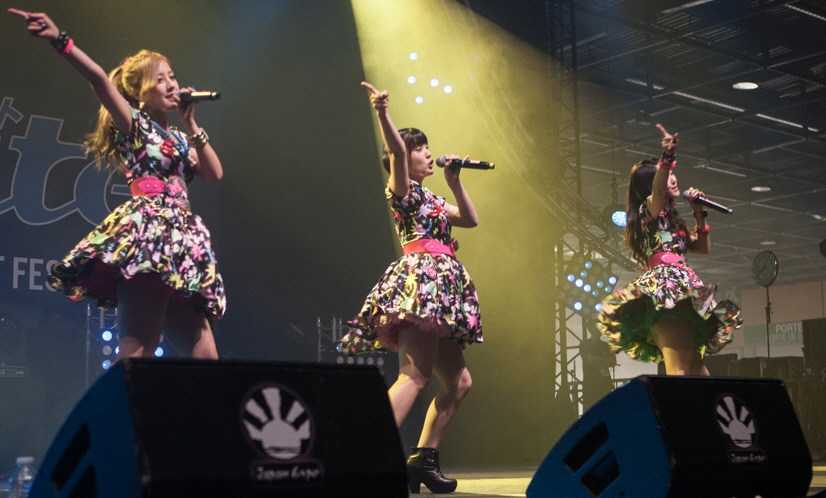
- Buono! performing at Japan Expo 2014

Background information
- Origin: Japan
- Genres: J-pop
- Years active: 2007–2017
- Label: Pony Canyon (2007–2010); Zetima (2011–2012); Up-Front Indies (2016)
- Spinoff of: Berryz Kobo; Cute
- Past members: Momoko Tsugunaga; Miyabi Natsuyaki; Airi Suzuki
- Website: www.helloproject.com/buono

Buono! was a subgroup of the Japanese girl groups Berryz Kobo and Cute, formed in 2007 by Up-Front Promotion and associated with Hello! Project. The members consisted of Momoko Tsugunaga and Miyabi Natsuyaki from Berryz Kobo, and Airi Suzuki from Cute. Their vocals were backed by the band Dolce, which formerly went under name Busters! in 2008.

Buono! was initially formed as a promotional group to perform theme songs for the Shugo Chara! anime series, which ran from 2007 to 2010. They continued as a group after the show's end, moving labels from Pony Canyon to Zetima and starring in the horror film Ring of Curse. The group disbanded in 2017.

== History ==
=== 2007–2010: Formation ===
Buono! was officially announced as a new girl group at the Nakayoshi Festival 2007 on July 21, 2007. The group was formed to sing both the opening ("Kokoro no Tamago") and ending ("Honto no Jibun") themes for the anime adaptation of the Shugo Chara! manga. The members consisted of Momoko Tsugunaga and Miyabi Natsuyaki from Berryz Kobo; and Airi Suzuki from Cute, who have worked together as labelmates in Hello! Project since joining the label in 2002 as Hello! Project Kids. Throughout their career, Buono! continued to record theme songs for Shugo Chara! and their works were featured in the anime's soundtrack.

Buono! also partnered up with pizza chain, Pizza-La, and starred in their commercials. They also had a weekly radio show endorsed by Pizza-La called Pizza-La presents Cafe Buono!

Buono! was to perform at the Japan Expo in Stockholm, Sweden, on May 24, 2009, but the convention was cancelled a month earlier on April 21, 2009, due to "the financial change in world economy, severe competition from other festivals/concerts as well as poor ticket sales."

=== 2010–2012: Label change ===
In December 2010, Buono! moved labels from Pony Canyon to Zetima. Their 11th single, "Zassou No Uta", was released on February 2, 2011. On October 29, 2011, Buono! starred in the horror film, Ring of Curse, marking their first feature film together as a group.

In February 2012, Buono! performed in Paris, France with a sold-out concert of 800 people. On June 25, 2012, Buono! took part in Yubi Matsuri, an idol festival produced by Rino Sashihara from AKB48 attended by 8,000 people.

=== 2016–2017: Final years and disbandment ===
After spending four years without CD releases, Buono! returned in 2016 with the song "So La Ti Do (Hey, Hey)" and a sold-out live event titled Buono! Festa 2016 held on August 25, 2016. Around the second half of 2016, both Tsugunaga and Suzuki announced that they were leaving Hello! Project in June 2017. On May 22, 2017, Buono! had their final concert, Buono! Live 2017: Pienezza, at the Yokohama Arena. Performing guests included Cute, Country Girls, and Natsuyaki's new girl group Pink Cres. 15,000 people attended the concert. The event was also broadcast on Nico Nico Live.

== Members ==
=== Buono! ===
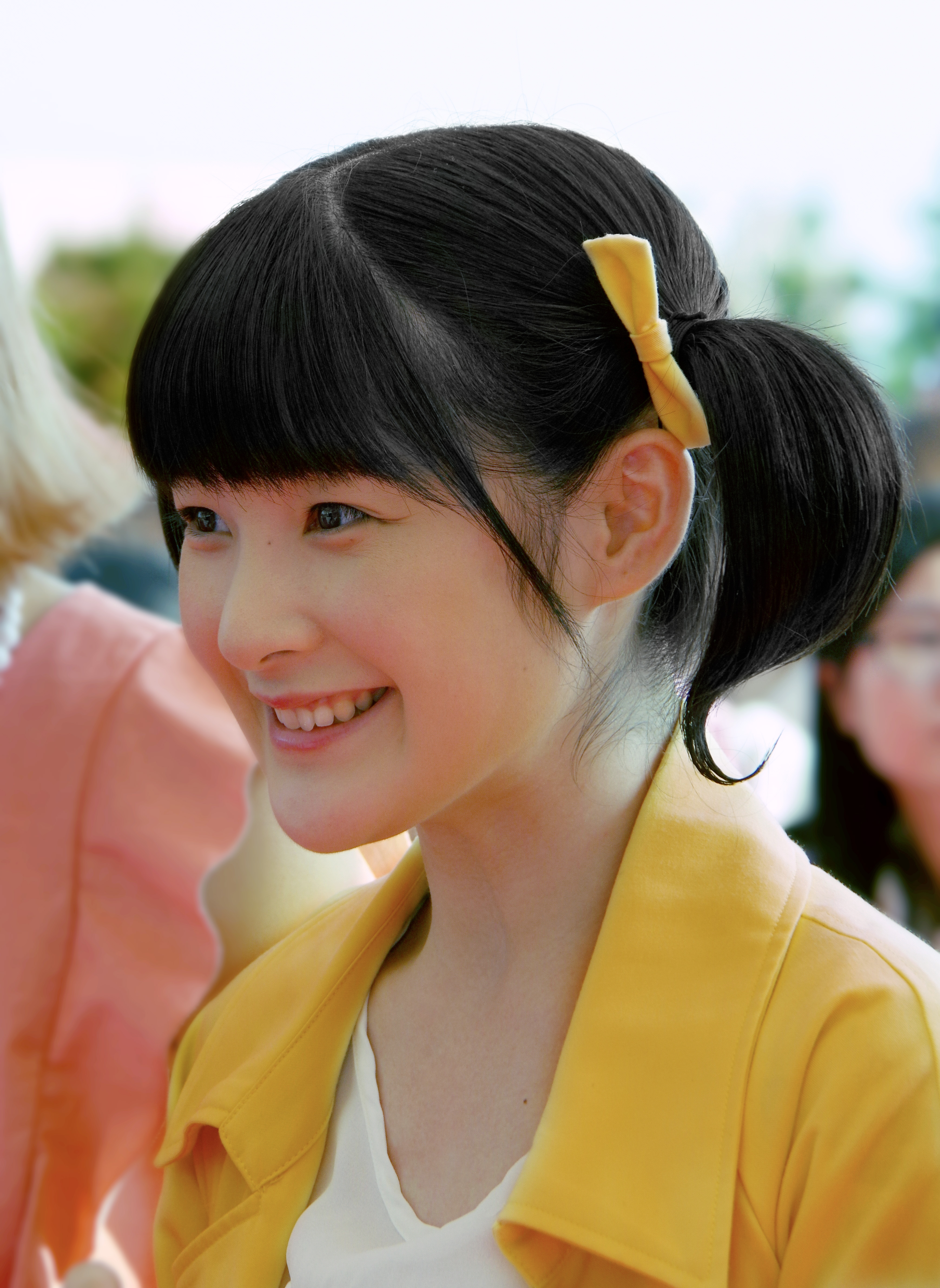
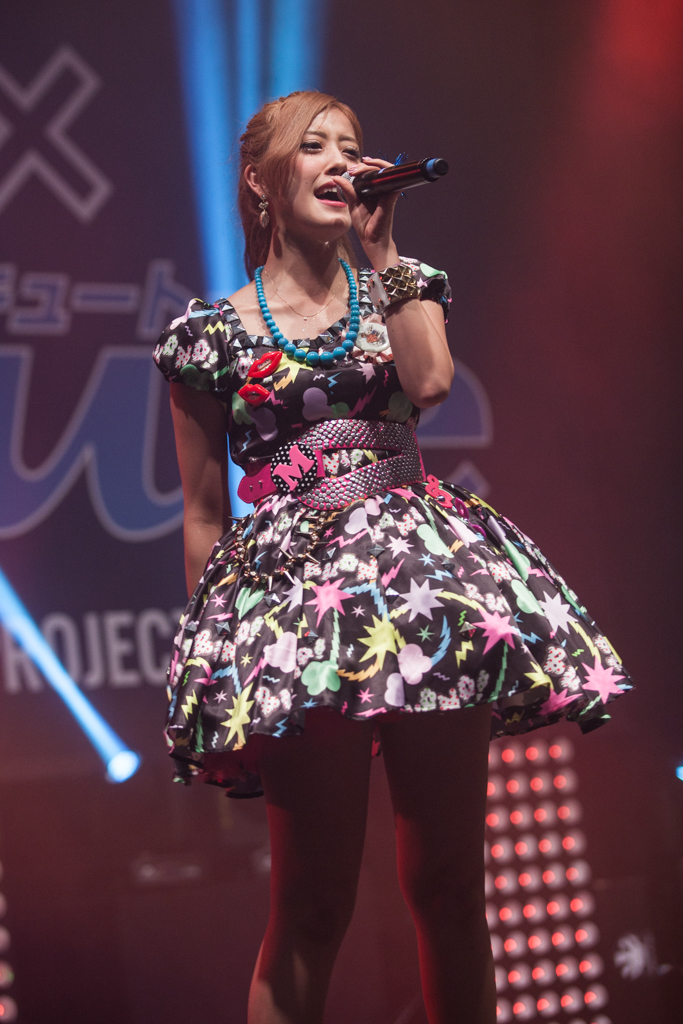
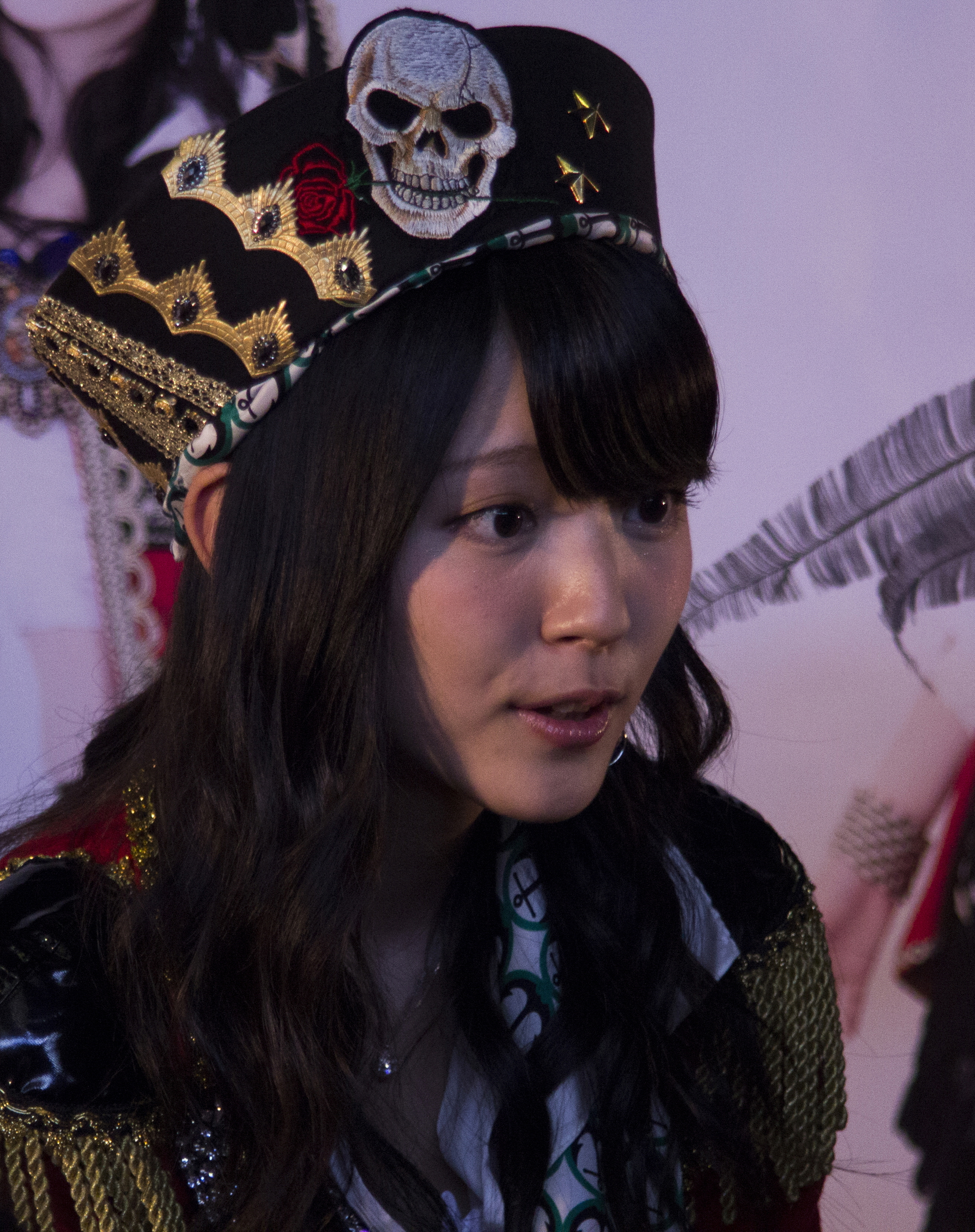
Buono!'s members consisted of Berryz Kobo members Momoko Tsugunaga (pictured in 2014) and Miyabi Natsuyaki (pictured in 2014); and Cute member Airi Suzuki (pictured in 2013)
- Momoko Tsugunaga (嗣永 桃子) from Berryz Kobo – leader
- Miyabi Natsuyaki (夏焼 雅) from Berryz Kobo – sub-leader
- Airi Suzuki (鈴木 愛理) from Cute – health guardian

=== Dolce ===
- Eji – keyboard
- Mariko Fujii (藤井 万利子) – guitar
- Kei Higuchi (ひぐち けい) – guitar
- Naomichi (なおみち) (Naomi Iwasaki (岩崎 なおみ, Iwasaki Naomi) – bass
- Maimai (まいまい) (Mai Imamura (今村 舞, Iwamura Mai)) – drums

== Discography ==
=== Studio albums ===
List of studio albums, with selected chart positions, sales figures and certifications
Title	Year	Album details	Peak chart positions	Sales
Title	Year	Album details	JPN	Sales
Café Buono!	2008	Released: February 20, 2008; Label: Pony Canyon; Formats: CD	11	23,782
Buono! 2	2009	Released: February 11, 2009; Label: Pony Canyon; Formats: CD	7	19,857
We Are Buono!	2010	Released: February 10, 2010; Label: Pony Canyon; Formats: CD	11	13,496

=== Compilation albums ===
List of compilation albums, with selected chart positions, sales figures and certifications
Title	Year	Album details	Peak chart positions	Sales
Title	Year	Album details	JPN	Sales
The Best Buono!	2010	Released: August 10, 2010; Label: Pony Canyon; Formats: CD	16	10,119

=== Extended plays ===
List of extended plays, with selected chart positions, sales figures and certifications
Title	Year	EP details	Peak chart positions	Sales
Title	Year	EP details	JPN	Sales
Partenza	2011	Released: August 10, 2011; Label: Pony Canyon; Formats: CD	21	6,442
Sherbet	2012	Released: August 22, 2012; Label: Pony Canyon; Formats: CD	14	8,360

=== Singles ===
List of singles, with selected chart positions, sales figures and certifications
Title	Year	Peak chart positions		Sales	Album
Title	Year	JPN	JPN Hot	Sales	Album
"Honto no Jibun" (ホントのじぶん)	2007	5	—	42,035+	Café Buono!
"Renai Rider" (恋愛■ライダー)	2008	7	—	35,254+	Café Buono!
"Kiss! Kiss! Kiss!"	2008	4	—	36,675+	Buono! 2
"Gachinko de Ikō! (ガチンコでいこう!)"	2008	6	—	31,005+	Buono! 2
"Rottara Rottara" (ロッタラ ロッタラ)	2008	8	—	27,104+	Buono! 2
"Co-no-mi-chi"	2009	4	—	22,735+	Buono! 2
"My Boy"	2009	7	—	23,621+	We Are Buono!
"Take It Easy!"	2009	10	—	18,170+	We Are Buono!
"Bravo Bravo"	2009	4	—	20,380+	We Are Buono!
"Our Songs"	2010	8	—	15,692+	The Best Buono!
"Zassō no Uta" (雑草のうた)	2011	9	—	14,794+	Partenza
"Natsu Dakara!" (夏ダカラ!)	2011	13	—	12,554+	Partenza
"Hatsukoi Cider / Deep Mind" (初恋サイダー/DEEP MIND)	2012	7	63	13,899+	Sherbet
"So La Ti Do (Hey, Hey)" (ソラシド～ねえねえ～)	2016	14	—	1,605+	Non-album single
"—" denotes releases that did not chart or were not released in that region.

== Filmography ==
=== Film ===
Year	Title	Notes
2011	Ring of Curse	
