= Asadora =

Japanese serialized television series

Renzoku Terebi Shōsetsu (連続テレビ小説, "serial TV novel"), colloquially known as asadora (朝ドラ, "Morning Drama"), is a serialized, 15 minutes per episode, Japanese television drama program series broadcast in the mornings by Japanese public broadcaster NHK. The first such series aired in 1961 with the black-and-white A Daughter and Me (娘と私, Musume to Watashi), starring Takeshi Kitazawa which aired in Japan Monday through Friday mornings—it was also the only of such series to be aired for 20 minutes per episode. From 1975 onward, series aired in the first half of the year are produced by the NHK Tokyo Broadcasting station and series in the latter half of the year are produced by the NHK Osaka Broadcasting station; the Osaka branch's first asadora production was Whirlpools (うず潮, Uzushio) in 1964.

Due to the practice of wiping commonly in practice around the world in the 1960s and 1970s, not all episodes of all pre-1980 asadora series survive, as the 2-inch Quad videotapes were often wiped and reused; 16 of the produced asadora series in total are incomplete in the NHK archives, with several series having no surviving episodes at all. Several late 1970s series are complete in the archive as the result of off-air home video recordings donated by viewers; all series from Big Sister Ma (マー姉ちゃん, Mā-nē-chan) (1979) onward are retained in full in their original formats.

Asadora currently airs in Japan Monday through Saturday mornings on NHK General TV from 8:00 to 8:15, with a rebroadcast the same day from 12:45 to 13:00. Starting with Yell (エール, Ēru) (2020), the timeslot changed to Monday through Friday mornings, with the omnibus airings on Saturday. The asadora have become some of the most popular shows on Japanese television, with series such as Oshin, earning an overall 52.6-percent ratings for the series.

Virtually all of the storylines center on the life of a female heroine who faces challenges while working to achieve her dreams. The heroine is chosen by NHK through an audition that involves interviews with several thousand applicants. The winning actress not only stars in an asadora, but also becomes a spokeswoman for NHK, and is usually involved in NHK-sponsored events—including the annual Kōhaku Uta Gassen New Year's Eve event. Often, the asadora serves as a springboard for the actress to other opportunities within the Japanese entertainment industry.

The current series is Blossom

== List of series ==
Shōwa
	Title (Literal meaning)	First aired	Last aired	Notes
1	Musume to Watashi (娘と私) (Daughter and Me)	3 April 1961	30 March 1962	Starring Takeshi Kitazawa in a story of a father taking care of his step-daughter, born between his now-deceased wife and a Frenchman. The only Asadora until 2020 to be broadcast in only five 15-minute episodes per week Monday through Friday. Three episodes are retained in the NHK archives.
2	Ashita no kaze (あしたの風) (Wind of Tomorrow)	2 April 1962	30 March 1963	Starring Fumiko Watanabe in a drama of a poor family after the war. The first Asadora to be broadcast in 15-minute episodes Monday through Saturday. Only the final episode currently survives in the NHK archives.
3	Akatsuki (あかつき) (Dawn)	1 April 1963	4 April 1964	Starring Shin Saburi as a professor who quits the university to become a painter. Two episodes currently survive in the NHK archives.
4	Uzushio (うず潮) (Whirlpools)	6 April 1964	3 April 1965	Starring Michiko Hayashi as a woman born in poverty who lives a brave life. Based on a novel by Fumiko Hayashi. Two episodes currently survive in the NHK archives.
5	Tamayura (たまゆら) (By Accident)	5 April 1965	2 April 1966	Starring Chishū Ryū as an old man who begins to travel after he retires. From a story written for television by Yasunari Kawabata. All episodes are missing from the NHK archives.
6	Ohanahan (おはなはん) (Miss Flower)	4 April 1966	1 April 1967	Starring Fumie Kashiyama as a woman, born in the Meiji era, who raises a family by herself. Nine episodes of the original broadcast version are retained in the NHK archives, but an alternate version which edited the original 15-minute episodes into hour-long omnibus format is fully intact, with all 48 episodes extant; this version was later re-edited into 15-minute episodes in 1993 for a special repeat broadcast.
7	Tabiji (旅路) (The Way to Travel)	3 April 1967	30 March 1968	Starring Tadashi Yokouchi in a narrative about an employee of the national railroad living through 50 years of modern history with his wife. Three episodes of the original broadcast version survive in the NHK archives, but as with Ohanahan, a re-edited omnibus version also exists in full, though it has never been rebroadcast.
8	Ashita koso (あしたこそ) (Tomorrow)	1 April 1968	5 April 1969	Starring Yumiko Fujita in a family drama. The first asadora to be broadcast in color. All episodes save for #315 (the finale) are missing from the NHK archives.
9	Nobuko to obāchan (信子とおばあちゃん) (Noboko and Granny)	7 April 1969	4 April 1970	Starring Naoko Otani as a young woman living with her grandmother. All episodes are missing from the NHK archives.
10	Niji (虹) (Rainbow)	6 April 1970	3 April 1971	Starring Yōko Minamida as a woman who supported her family during and after World War II. All episodes are missing from the NHK archives, though a brief clip does survive as part of a contemporary news segment documenting the drama's production.
11	Mayuko hitori (繭子ひとり) (Mayuko, The Only One)	5 April 1971	1 April 1972	Starring Karin Yamaguchi. Second highest rated Asadora with an average rating of 47.4%. All episodes are missing from the NHK archives, though portions of episodes 24 and 125 have been recovered from off-air U-matic and Betamax recordings.
12	Ai yori aoku (藍より青く) (Green Comes From Blue)	3 April 1972	31 March 1973	Starring Hiroko Maki. Screenplay by Taiichi Yamada. Third highest rated Asadora at 47.3%. The first episode and part of the final episode are retained in the NHK archives.
13	Kita no kazoku (北の家族) (Family from the North)	2 April 1973	30 March 1974	Starring Yōko Takahashi in a story about a brother and sister coming of age in Hakodate and Kanazawa. Six episodes survive in the NHK archives.
14	Hatoko no umi (鳩子の海) (Hatako's Sea)	1 April 1974	5 April 1975	Starring Mihoko Fujita as a woman who lost her memory after experiencing the atomic bombing of Hiroshima. The first and last episodes survive in their original broadcast format, while 38 additional episodes have been recovered from off-air recordings.
15	Mizuiro no toki (水色の時) (Aqua Age)	7 April 1975	4 October 1975	Starring Shinobu Otake in a story about a young woman striving to become a doctor and her mother, who is a nurse. The first asadora to run for a six-month period. Average rating of 40.1%. The first and last episodes survive in their original broadcast format, while 9 additional episodes have been recovered from off-air recordings.
16	Ohayōsan (おはようさん) (Good Morning, Madam)	6 October 1975	3 April 1976	Starring Yoko Akino in a contemporary story about a woman office worker. Four episodes survive in their original broadcast format, with additional episodes having been recovered from off-air recordings.
17	Kumo no jūtan (雲のじゅうたん) (Mat of Cloud)	5 April 1976	2 October 1976	Starring Yōko Asaji as a woman who wants to become a pilot. The earliest asadora to have all originally broadcast episodes retained in full in the NHK archives.
18	Hi no kuni ni (火の国に) (Nation of Fire)	4 October 1976	2 April 1977	Starring Keiko Suzuka about a woman who strives to become a landscape gardener. Eight episodes survive in the NHK archives.
19	Ichibanboshi (いちばん星) (Like a Star)	4 April 1977	1 October 1977	A dramatization of the life of the singer Chiyako Sato. Michiko Godai replaced Haruna Takase in the lead two months into the series when Takase became ill. All episodes survive in the NHK archives, but only the first and last in their original broadcast format; all others were recovered from off-air recordings.
20	Kazamidori (風見鶏) (Chicken-shaped Anemoscope)	3 October 1977	1 April 1978	Starring Harumi Arai as a woman who marries a German and starts a bakery in Kobe. All episodes survive in the NHK archives, recovered from off-air recordings.
21	Otei-chan (おていちゃん) (Otei-chan)	3 April 1978	30 September 1978	Starring Chikako Yuri in a dramatization of the life of Sadako Sawamura. Ten episodes survive in the NHK archives.
22	Watashi wa umi (わたしは海) (I Am the Sea)	2 October 1978	31 March 1979	Starring Tomoko Aihara. About a woman raising war orphans. Three episodes survive in the NHK archives. The most recent asadora to have missing episodes; all subsequent series survive in full.
23	Mā-nē-chan (マー姉ちゃん) (Big Sister Ma)	2 April 1979	29 September 1979	Based on autobiographical stories penned by manga artist Machiko Hasegawa and featuring her older sister. Starring Mami Kumagai and Yūko Tanaka.
24	Ayu no uta (鮎のうた) (Song of Ayu Fish)	1 October 1979	5 April 1980	Starring Senri Yamazaki as a woman who makes her life at a fishing port.
25	Natchan no shashinkan (なっちゃんの写真館) (Natchan's Photo Studio)	7 April 1980	4 October 1980	Starring Tomoko Hoshino as a woman who strives to become a photographer.
26	Niji o oru (虹を織る) (Knit Rainbow)	6 October 1980	4 April 1981	Starring Misako Konno as a woman from Hagi, Yamaguchi, who joins the Takarazuka Revue.
27	Mansaku no hana (まんさくの花) (The Flower of Hamamelis)	6 April 1981	3 October 1981	A rare asadora that is wholly set in contemporary Japan.
28	Honjitsu mo seiten nari (本日も晴天なり) (Another Sunny Day)	5 October 1981	3 April 1982	Starring Hideko Hara as a woman who becomes a radio announcer and then a writer.
29	Haikara-san (ハイカラさん) (Vogue)	5 April 1982	2 October 1982	Starring Satomi Tezuka as a woman who starts a hotel in the Meiji era.
30	Yōi don (よーいドン) (Become a Great Person)	4 October 1982	2 April 1983	Starring Kumiko Fujiyoshi as a woman who suffers family hardships before achieving success as a marathon runner.
31	Oshin (おしん)	4 April 1983	31 March 1984	Starring Ayako Kobayashi, Yūko Tanaka, and Nobuko Otowa – Oshin's perseverance pulls her through various challenges during her life. The first asadora to be broadcast outside of Japan, and also the most internationally successful, having aired in 73 countries. The episode aired on 12 November 1983 is the highest-rated in Japanese television drama history, garnering a 62.9 percent viewer share.
32	Romansu (ロマンス) (Romance)	2 April 1984	29 September 1984	Starring Takaaki Enoki as a young man who becomes a film director. The first Asadora with a male lead since 1967.
33	Kokoro wa itsumo ramune-iro (心はいつもラムネ色) (My Heart is Like Lemon-soda)	1 October 1984	30 March 1985	Starring Eisaku Shindō as a man who loves manzai. Average rating of 40.2%.
34	Miotsukushi (澪つくし) (Day Beacon)	1 April 1985	5 October 1985	Starring Yasuko Sawaguchi. Average rating of 44.3%.
35	Ichiban-daiko (いちばん太鼓) (Best Taiko Drum)	7 October 1985	5 April 1986	Starring Shin'ichirō Okano. About a man who enters the world of popular theatre.
36	Hanekonma (はね駒) (Vigorous Pony)	7 April 1986	4 October 1986	Starring Yuki Saito. Average rating of 41.7%.
37	Miyako no kaze (都の風) (Wind of the City)	6 October 1986	4 April 1987	Starring Miyuki Kanō. A woman from Kyoto moves to Nara and runs a ryokan and then enters the fashion industry.
38	Chotchan (チョッちゃん) (Chotchan)	6 April 1987	3 October 1987	Starring Hiro Komura. Based on the autobiography of Chō Kuroyanagi, Tetsuko Kuroyanagi's mother.
39	Hassai Sensei (はっさい先生) (Teacher Hassai)	5 October 1987	2 April 1988	Starring Mayumi Wakamura. About a woman from Tokyo who goes to teach at an all-boys school.
40	Non-chan no yume (ノンちゃんの夢) (Dream of Non-chan)	4 April 1988	1 October 1988	Starring Tomoko Fujita. About a woman who struggles to survive after World War II and starts a magazine. Average rating of 39.1%.
41	Jun-chan no ōenka (純ちゃんの応援歌) (Supporting Song of Jun-chan)	3 October 1988	1 April 1989	Starring Tomoko Yamaguchi in her acting debut. Average rating of 38.6%.
Heisei
42	Seishun kazoku (青春家族) (Youthfulness Family)	3 April 1989	30 September 1989	Stars Misa Shimizu and Ayumi Ishida. Average rating of 37.8%.
43	Wakko no kin medaru (和っこの金メダル) (Wakko's Gold Medal)	2 October 1989	31 March 1990	About a female volleyball player who helps out the local community. Starring Azusa Watanabe.
44	Rinrin to (凛凛と) (Rinrin)	2 April 1990	29 September 1990	About a man who developed an early television system. Starring Minoru Tanaka.
45	Kyō, futari (京、ふたり) (Kyoto, Two People)	1 October 1990	30 March 1991	Set in an old Kyoto tsukemono store, this series depicted the conflicts between a woman, her daughter and her father-in-law.
46	Kimi no na wa (君の名は) (What is Your Name?)	1 April 1991	4 April 1992	The first year-long series since Oshin. Starred Kyōka Suzuki, but ended up being the first Asadora with an average rating under 30%.
47	Onna wa dokyō (おんなは度胸) (Women Need To Be Brave)	6 April 1992	3 October 1992	Chronicles the conflicts between a woman and her step-daughter in a hot springs town. Starring Pinko Izumi and Sachiko Sakurai.
48	Hirari (ひらり) (Power and Beauty)	5 October 1992	3 April 1993	Starring Hikari Ishida. Screenplay by Makiko Uchidate, who is a member of the Japan Sumo Association, and is involved in sumo matters, such as advancing rikishi to the rank of Yokozuna. The storyline evolves around sumo – as the heroine become a nutritionist and works within the sumo system. Average rating of 36.9%.
49	Ee Nyobo (ええにょぼ) (Good Wife)	5 April 1993	2 October 1993	A woman works hard to become a good doctor even though she is separated from her husband. Starring Naho Toda.
50	Karin (かりん) (Pseudocydonia)	4 October 1993	2 April 1994	A young woman, whose family runs an old miso company in Nagano Prefecture, lives through the hardships of postwar Japan. Starring Naomi Hosokawa. Last Asadora to top 30% in ratings.
51	Piano (ぴあの)	4 April 1994	1 October 1994	About the youngest of four sisters, all raised solely by their father, who wants to write children's books. Starring Risa Junna.
52	Haru yo, koi (春よ、来い) (Spring, Please Come!)	3 October 1994	30 September 1995	A successful screenwriter looks back on her life when she learns her husband has cancer. A year-long series, starring Narumi Yasuda.
53	Hashiran ka! (走らんか!) (Go Ahead Without Reserve)	2 October 1995	30 March 1996	Set in Hakata, the series is about a young man who wants to play rock music even though his father expects him to follow him in making Hakata ningyō. One of the few Asadora starring a male character.
54	Himawari (ひまわり) (Sunflower)	1 April 1996	5 October 1996	About a woman, played by Nanako Matsushima, striving to become a lawyer.
55	Futarikko (ふたりっ子) (Twins)	7 October 1996	5 April 1997	About a female professional shogi player and her twin sister. Starring Hiromi Iwasaki and Maiko Kikuchi, with Kana Mikura and Mana Mikura (ManaKana) playing them as children. Average rating of 29.0%
56	Aguri (あぐり)	7 April 1997	4 October 1997	Based on the life of the beauty stylist Aguri Yoshiyuki, who married the novelist Eisuke Yoshiyuki and became the mother of the novelist Junnosuke Yoshiyuki and the actress Kazuko Yoshiyuki. Starring Misato Tanaka and Mansai Nomura.
57	Amakarashan (甘辛しゃん) (Sweet and Spicy Beauty)	6 October 1997	4 April 1998	About a young woman who hopes to become a sake brewer. Starring Yumiko Sato.
58	Ten Urara (天うらら) (Invigorating Day)	6 April 1998	3 October 1998	About a young woman training to be a carpenter who, through her own family situation, learns about the need for a barrier-free world. Starring Risa Sudo.
59	Yanchakure (やんちゃくれ) (Mischievous Girl)	5 October 1998	3 April 1999	About a young woman in Osaka who helps resurrect a shipbuilding company. Starring Miho Konishi.
60	Suzuran (すずらん) (Lily of the Valley)	5 April 1999	2 October 1999	Follows the life of a woman, raised in a coal town in Hokkaido by a father who worked on the railroad, from the 1920s to the 1930s. Starring Nagiko Tōno and Chieko Baisho.
61	Asuka (あすか)	4 October 1999	1 April 2000	Asuka learns to become a wagashi maker, even though wagashi is a heavily male-dominated field. Starring Yūko Takeuchi.
62	Watashi no aozora (私の青空) (My Blue Sky)	3 April 2000	30 September 2000	About a young woman whose fiancé leaves her, pregnant, at the altar. With her son, she leaves for Tsukiji to make it on her own. Starring Tomoko Tabata.
63	Ōdorī (Audrey オードリー) (Audrey)	2 October 2000	31 March 2001	About a young woman involved in the Japanese film industry in Kyoto. Starring Aya Okamoto.
64	Churasan (ちゅらさん) (Water Lady)	2 April 2001	29 September 2001	The first Asadora set in Okinawa. Starring Ryōko Kuninaka.
65	Honmamon (ほんまもん) (Gourmet Life)	1 October 2001	30 March 2002	About a young woman striving to become a chef in Wakayama Prefecture. Starring Chizuru Ikewaki.
66	Sakura (さくら)	1 April 2002	28 September 2002	Sakura Matsushita (Shiho Takano) is a third-generation Japanese-American, living in Honolulu, Hawaii. Her dream is to become an ALT teacher in Japan, and moves there to achieve her dream. First asadora to be recorded in HD.
67	Manten (まんてん) (Full of the Sky)	30 September 2002	29 March 2003	Starring Mao Miyaji. About a woman who studies to be a meteorologist.
68	Kokoro (こころ) (Heart)	31 March 2003	27 September 2003	Starring Noriko Nakagoshi. Set in Asakusa, Tokyo.
69	Teruteru Kazoku (てるてる家族) (Happy Family)	29 September 2003	27 March 2004	Starring Satomi Ishihara and based on a novel by Rei Nakanishi. First Asadora to average under 20% in ratings.
70	Tenka (天花) (Ceiling)	29 March 2004	25 September 2004	Starring Ema Fujisawa as a young woman from Sendai, Miyagi
71	Wakaba (わかば)	27 September 2004	26 March 2005	Starring Natsuki Harada as a young woman who becomes a landscaper
72	Fight (ファイト)	28 March 2005	1 October 2005	Yuika Motokariya stars as 15-year-old Kido Yū, living with her family in Takasaki, Gunma Prefecture. Yū faces tough times, and relies on the friendship of a horse to keep her spirits up.
73	Kaze no Haruka (風のハルカ) (Haruka in the Wind)	3 October 2005	1 April 2006	Starring Eri Murakawa. Takes place in Yufuin, Ōita Prefecture. Haruka's goal is to become a travel agent, and moves to Osaka, leaving her father and sister behind, to achieve her dream.
74	Junjō Kirari (純情きらり) (Shining Junjo)	3 April 2006	30 September 2006	Starring Aoi Miyazaki. Sakurako's dream is to become a jazz pianist. Events take place in Okazaki, Aichi Prefecture.
75	Imo Tako Nankin (芋たこなんきん) (Taro, Octopus and Pumpkin)	2 October 2006	31 March 2007	Based on a true story, Naomi Fujiyama plays the heroine role of Machiko Hanaoka – a 37-year-old woman who dreams of becoming a novelist. She marries into an extended family. Events take place in the city of Osaka.
76	Dondo Hare (どんど晴れ) (Clear Up Soon!)	2 April 2007	29 September 2007	Stars Manami Higa. Screenplay by Eriko Komatsu. Natsumi marries an heir of a high class ryokan, located in Morioka, Iwate Prefecture. She then becomes the ryokan's okami or manager.
77	Chiritotechin (ちりとてちん) (Life's Like a Comedy)	1 October 2007	29 March 2008	Starring Shihori Kanjiya. The storyline focuses on the art of rakugo. Kiyomi's dream is to become a rakugoka, despite rakugo being a male-dominated field.
78	Hitomi (瞳) (Eyes)	31 March 2008	27 September 2008	Starring Nana Eikura. Hitomi's dream is to become a dancer of modern music.
79	Dandan (だんだん) (Thank You)	29 September 2008	28 March 2009	Starring identical twins Mana and Kana Mikura (of Futarikko fame). Finding each other years after being separated as children, they work together to achieve their dreams as singers.
80	Tsubasa (つばさ) (Wings)	30 March 2009	26 September 2009	Starring Mikako Tabe as Tsubasa who works at a local radio station, and eventually becomes a disc jockey.
81	Wel-kame (ウェルかめ) (Welcome Back)	28 September 2009	27 March 2010	Starring Kana Kurashina. About a girl from Minami-cho, Tokushima who, inspired by seeing a sea turtle when she was six, strives to become a magazine editor. Lowest rated Asadora at 13.5%.
82	Gegege no Nyobo (ゲゲゲの女房) (My Husband Is a Cartoonist)	29 March 2010	25 September 2010	Starring Nao Matsushita. Fumie is the wife of manga artist Shigeru Mizuki. The screenplay is based on her rags to riches biography.
83	Teppan (てっぱん) (Teppanyaki)	27 September 2010	2 April 2011	Starring Miori Takimoto and Sumiko Fuji. Akari's natural mother is originally from Osaka. She moves to Osaka to live with her grandmother to learn more about her mother. She learns that her grandmother closed the okonomiyaki restaurant after Akari's teenage mother ran away. Akari then re-opens the restaurant.
84	Ohisama (おひさま) (Sunshine)	4 April 2011	1 October 2011	Starring Mao Inoue. The title refers to the sun, and thus also relates to the heroine Yoko, whose name means "child of the sun". Yoko's dream is to become a school teacher, but she also experiences tough times during the Pacific War.
85	Carnation (カーネーション)	3 October 2011	31 March 2012	Starring Machiko Ono. Based on the life of fashion designer Ayako Koshino. Her three daughters would eventually all become fashion designers.
86	Umechan Sensei (梅ちゃん先生) (Doctor Umechan)	2 April 2012	29 September 2012	Starring Maki Horikita, who plays a young woman striving to become a physician in post-World War II Tokyo.
87	Jun to Ai (純と愛) (Jun and Ai)	1 October 2012	30 March 2013	Starring Natsuna as a young woman who wants to start her ideal hotel. Set in Osaka and Miyakojima.
88	Amachan (あまちゃん) (Little Ama)	1 April 2013	28 September 2013	Starring Rena Nōnen as a young woman who becomes an ama and then an idol before returning to Tohoku to help revive the area after the earthquake.
89	Gochisōsan (ごちそうさん) (Thanks for the Hospitality)	30 September 2013	29 March 2014	Starring Anne Watanabe as a young woman trying to learn how to cook Japanese cuisine during the Taisho and Shōwa periods.
90	Hanako to Anne (花子とアン) (Hanako and Anne)	31 March 2014	27 September 2014	Starring Yuriko Yoshitaka as Hanako Muraoka, the woman who first translated Anne of Green Gables into Japanese.
91	Massan (マッサン)	29 September 2014	28 March 2015	Starring Charlotte Kate Fox as Ellie Kameyama, wife of Masaharu Kameyama, portrayed by Tetsuji Tamayama, a man who starts whisky brewing in Japan. It is based on the life of Rita Taketsuru, a Scotswoman who married the Japanese man Masataka Taketsuru, the father of Japan's whisky industry. The title comes from Rita's nickname for Masataka. Fox is the first non-Japanese actress to be the lead star in an asadora production.
92	Mare (まれ)	30 March 2015	26 September 2015	Starring Tao Tsuchiya as a young woman from the Noto Peninsula who wants to become a pâtissière.
93	Asa ga Kita (あさが来た) (Here Comes Asa!)	28 September 2015	2 April 2016	Starring Haru as Asa Imai. Based on the life of Asako Hirooka, a pioneering Japanese businesswoman.
94	Toto Neechan (とと姉ちゃん) (Daddy Sister)	4 April 2016	1 October 2016	Starring Mitsuki Takahata as Tsuneko Kohashi, a woman who starts a successful consumer advice magazine.
95	Beppinsan (べっぴんさん) (Miss Beppin)	3 October 2016	1 April 2017	Starring Kyoko Yoshine as Sumire, a brave woman who starts a company makes clothing for children. Based on the lives of Atsuko Banno, founder of Familiar.
96	Hiyokko (ひよっこ) (Bloom)	3 April 2017	30 September 2017	Starring Kasumi Arimura as Mineko Yatabe, a young woman who travels from rural Ibaraki Prefecture to Tokyo in the mid-1960s to find her lost father.
97	Warotenka (わろてんか) (Laugh It Up!)	2 October 2017	31 March 2018	Starring Wakana Aoi as Ten Fujioka. Based on the lives of the founders of Yoshimoto Kogyo.
98	Hanbun, Aoi. (半分、青い。) (Half Blue Sky)	2 April 2018	29 September 2018	Starring Mei Nagano as Suzume Nireno. About a woman who lost hearing in one ear who, after failing as a mangaka, becomes an inventor.
99	Manpuku (まんぷく) (Mampuku)	1 October 2018	30 March 2019	Starring Sakura Ando as Fukuko Imai. Based on the lives of Momofuku Andō, who invented instant ramen, and his wife Masako.
100	Natsuzora (なつぞら) (Summer Sky)	1 April 2019	28 September 2019	Starring Suzu Hirose as Natsu Okuhara, an orphan raised in Hokkaido who wants to become an animator.
Reiwa
101	Scarlet (スカーレット)	30 September 2019	28 March 2020	Starring Erika Toda as Kimiko Kawahara, who aims to become a ceramic artist.
102	Yell (エール)	30 March 2020	27 November 2020	Starring Masataka Kubota as Yūichi Koyama. Based on the life of composer Yūji Koseki. The first asadora to be recorded in 4K, and the first since Musume to Watashi to be broadcast in only five 15-minute episodes per week Monday through Friday, with omnibus airings on Saturday mornings instead of a fresh episode. Due to the COVID-19 pandemic, the series was forced to suspend production, and no new episodes were aired from 29 June to 11 September 2020; completed episodes were rerun during this time. The production delay also made it the first asadora to conclude broadcast outside the usual March–April or September–October cycles.
103	Ochoyan (おちょやん) (Little Waitress)	30 November 2020	14 May 2021	Starring Hana Sugisaki as Chiyo Takei. Based on the life of Chieko Naniwa. The suspension of production due to the COVID-19 pandemic delayed the conclusion of its predecessor Yell (エール), making it the first asadora to start airing on a day outside the usual March–April or September–October cycles.
104	Okaeri Mone (おかえりモネ) (Welcome Back, Mone)	17 May 2021	29 October 2021	Starring Kaya Kiyohara as Momone Nagaura, who dreams of being a meteorologist.
105	Come Come Everybody (カムカムエヴリバディ)	1 November 2021	8 April 2022	Starring Mone Kamishiraishi, Eri Fukatsu, and Rina Kawaei. The story is about 100 years-old family, three generations, grandmother, mother, and daughter who walked with a radio English course during the Showa, Heisei, and Reiwa eras. This is the first time in the history of a serial television novel that three actresses play the three main characters as different heroines. The heroine baton will be passed down to the next generation in a relay system. At 112 episodes, it is the shortest asadora to date.
106	Chimudondon (ちむどんどん)	11 April 2022	30 September 2022	Starring Yuina Kuroshima as Nobuko Higa, who dreams of being a chef.
107	Soar High! (舞いあがれ！)	3 October 2022	31 March 2023	Starring Haruka Fukuhara as Mai Iwakura, who dreams of being a pilot.
108	Ranman (らんまん)	3 April 2023	29 September 2023	Starring Ryūnosuke Kamiki as Mantarō Makino, who dreams of being a botanist. It is loosely based on the life of botanist Tomitaro Makino.
109	Boogie Woogie (ブギウギ)	2 October 2023	29 March 2024	Starring Shuri as Suzuko Hanada, who dreams of being a singer. It is loosely based on the life of Shizuko Kasagi.
110	Tora ni Tsubasa (虎に翼) (The Tiger and Her Wings)	1 April 2024	27 September 2024	Starring Sairi Ito as Tomoko Inotsume, who dreams of being a lawyer. It is loosely based on the life of Yoshiko Mibuchi.
111	Omusubi (おむすび)	30 September 2024	28 March 2025	Starring Kanna Hashimoto as Yui Yoneda, who aspires to be a nutritionist.
112	Anpan (あんぱん)	31 March 2025	26 September 2025	Starring Mio Imada as Nobu Asada. It is loosely based on the life of Nobu Komatsu, the wife of Takashi Yanase, the creator of Anpanman.
113	The Ghost Writer's Wife (ばけばけ)	29 September 2025	27 March 2026	Starring Akari Takaishi as Toki Matsuno and Tommy Bastow as her husband Heaven. It is loosely based on the life of Setsu Koizumi, the wife of Yakumo Koizumi (Lafcadio Hearn), a Greek-Irish writer. Cast after beating more than 1,700 actors in an audition, Bastow is the first non-Japanese male actor to be the lead star in an asadora production.
114	The Scent of the Wind (風、薫る)	30 March 2026	25 September 2026	Starring Ai Mikami as Rin Ichinose and Juri Kosaka as Naomi Oya. It is loosely based on the lives of Chika Ozeki and Masa Suzuki, one of whom became Japan's first trained nurse.
115	Blossom (ブラッサム)	28 September 2026	Spring 2027 (tentative)	Starring Shizuka Ishibashi as Tama Hano. It is loosely based on the life of Chiyo Uno.
116	Mawaru Swan (巡るスワン)	Spring 2027 (tentative)	Fall 2027 (tentative)	Starring Misato Morita as Misaki Komatsu. While the story features a female police officer as the protagonist, there won't be any major incidents; instead, it's planned to be a heartwarming depiction of her daily life.
117	Nagisa no Shinkaron (なぎさの進化論)	Fall 2027 (tentative)	Spring 2028 (tentative)	Starring Ai Iinuma as Nagisa Fujishiro, a veterinarian. Set in Osaka and Yoron Island.
118	Honno Mokichi (ほんのモキチ)	Spring 2028 (tentative)	Fall 2028 (tentative)	Starring Yuumi Kawai as Teruko. It is loosely based on the life of Teruko Saitō, the wife of Mokichi Saitō.

== See also ==
- Television in Japan
- Japanese television drama
- Taiga drama
- KBS TV Novel, drama series of similar format produced by KBS in South Korea
