= Deep Mind =

Deep Mind may refer to:

- DeepMind, a London-based machine learning company acquired by Google in 2014
- "Hatsukoi Cider / Deep Mind", the 13th single by the Japanese band Buono!
