= Manten =

- Genre: Drama
- Written by: Nozomi Makino
- Directed by: Tomochika Kasaura; Mamoru Ohashi; Tsuyoshi Yanagawa; Mitsuhiro Fukui; Takako Yamada
- Starring: Mao Miyaji; Atsuko Asano; Takashi Fujii; Katsuhisa Namase; Sarina Suzuki; Shōei; Hanako Yamada; Nobuaki Kakuda; Mamoru Mohri; Matsunosuke Shofukutei; Fumiyo Kohinata; Ren Osugi; Hidekazu Akai; Tatsuya Mihashi; Nobuko Miyamoto
- Narrated by: Shunji Fujimura
- Opening theme: "Kono Machi" by Chitose Hajime
- Composer: Masahiro Kawasaki
- Country of origin: Japan
- Original language: Japanese
- No. of episodes: 150

Production
- Producer: Yoshinori Komiyama
- Running time: 15 minutes
- Production company: NHK Osaka

Original release
- Network: NHK
- Release: September 30, 2002 – March 29, 2003

Manten (まんてん, Manten) is a Japanese television drama series, the 67th Asadora series broadcast on NHK. It was aired on September 30, 2002 and ended on March 29, 2003. The drama tells about a young woman who studies to become a meteorologist.

== Cast ==
=== Main characters ===
- Mao Miyaji as Manten Hidaka
  - Chiaki Saito as young Manten Hidaka
- Takashi Fujii as Yōhei Hanayama
- Riku Nishimoto as Sora Hanayama
- Nobuko Miyamoto as Yuriko Hanayama
- Katsuhisa Namase as Keisuke Hanayama
- Sarina Suzuki as Nishiki Hanayama (her maiden name was Shinohara)
- Atsuko Asano as Mihoko Hozumi (her maiden name was Hidaka)
- Tatsuya Mihashi as Genji Hidaka
- Hidekazu Akai as Genkichi Hidaka
- Kiyoshi Hikawa as Hideo Hidaka
- Fumiyo Kohinata as Jinroku Hozumi
- Mitsuki Tanimura as Mikai Hozumi
- Yuriko Hirooka as Fumiko Tanaka

=== Kuroda family ===
- Nobuaki Kakuda as Masami Kuroda
- Midoriko Kimura as Kazue Kuroda
- Hanako Yamada as Tsubame Kuroda
- Yoshinori Yasuda as Iwao Kuroda
- Kazuyuki Maeda as Kojiro Kuroda

Preceded by Sakura	Asadora; 1 30 September 2002 – 29 March 2003	Succeeded by Kokoro
