= Mari Asato =

Japanese film director

Mari Asato 安里 麻里
- Born: 14 March 1976; Okinawa, Japan
- Occupation: Film director
- Years active: 1999–present

Mari Asato (安里 麻里, Asato Mari; born 14 March 1976) is a Japanese film director.

Primarily known for the film Ju-On: Black Ghost (2009), part of The Grudge film installments, her other films include the politically undertoned Samurai Chicks (Dokuritsu Shôjo Gurentai) (2004), the cinematic rendition of Boy From Hell (2004), Twilight Syndrome: Dead Go Round (2008), Ring of Curse (2011), Bilocation (2012) and Fatal Frame (2014).

== Early life ==
Mari Asato began her career as a photographer working as an apprentice under Kiyoshi Kurosawa during the filming of Barren Illusions in 1999. A few years later she worked under Hiroshi Takahashi as an assistant director on the production of Sodom the Killer (2004). It was after this time Asato began directing her own films, mostly contributing to already well-known horror franchises. In 2011, she entered her most successful and active phase of film-making, continuously releasing sequels and feature films.

== Career ==
=== Ring of Curse (Gomennasai) (2011) ===
Gomennasai (ごめんなさい )

Also known as Gomennasai, Ring of Curse literally means "I'm sorry". The film is an adaptation of Yuka Hidaka's mobile phone novel Gomennasai. Structured similarly to the original novel, the film follows a chaptered structure of diary entries.

=== Bilocation (2012) ===
Asato's second feature film, released in 2012, is based on an award-winning novel by Hojo Haruka in 2010, which won best Japanese horror novel of the year. Noted for its near all-female production team and cast, Bilocation is a revolution to the doppelgänger genre. Directed by a woman and starring a female lead, as well as being an adaptation drawing from the works of Hojo, the female-authored Bilocation distinguished itself from the male-dominated genre.

Composed on the basis Freudian themes of human desire, Bilocation or 'the state of being in two places simultaneously' is the overriding theme of the film. Starring a veteran of Japanese horror, Asami Mizukawa, the film draws multiple hidden parallels to doppelgänger tropes and religion, specifically the story of Cain and Abel in the Book of Genesis.

=== Fatal Frame (Gekijōban Zero) (2014) ===
Otherwise known as Gekijoban Zero, Fatal Frame is a dark horror film playing with themes of sexuality and intense atmospheric tones. Drawing direct inspiration from the original Fatal Frame video game franchise, also known as Project Zero for PlayStation 2, Fatal Frame's horror experience mimics the atmosphere of the game, a style that is well known in the contemporary Japanese horror genre. Also an adaptation of Eiji Otsuka's original novel Fatal Frame: A Curse Affecting Only Girls, Asato uses the graphic description and contents to build a greater horror base in visual effects.

Set in an all-girls high school, Asato plays with both underlying and prominent aspects of homosexual interactions. With an all-female cast, Fatal Frame actively presents a classic horror genre film in a pro-female light. Regarding the Bechdel Test, the female interactions coincide with the lack of male presence and minimal verbal mention of male characters. In reference to the all-girl high school, Asato either builds upon or avoids generalized female gender tropes while casting new unknown actresses.

The film often references John Everett Millais's famous painting Ophelia, the mid-Victorian piece in which Shakespeare's famous character Ophelia, from his play Hamlet, drowns herself in a stream due to madness. Asato's style is directly referencing the eerie beauty of Ophelia's corpse floating in the river. She has been referred to as creating an 'Ophelia' world in rural Japan.

== Filmography ==
- Jigoku Kozō (2004)
- Dokuritsu Shôjo Gurentai (2004)
- Twilight Syndrome: Dead Go Round (2008)
- Ju-On: Black Ghost (2009)
- Gomennasai (2011)
- Bilocation (2014)
- Gekijōban Zero (2014)
- Hyouka: Forbidden Secrets (2017)
- Under Your Bed (2019)

== See also ==
- List of female film and television directors
- List of LGBT-related films directed by women
