= Kōsuke Toyohara =

Japanese actor and singer (born 1965)

- 豊原 功補
- Born: 25 September 1965 (age 60); Shinjuku, Tokyo, Japan
- Citizenship: South Korea → Japan
- Occupations: Actor, singer
- Years active: 1982–present
- Website: www.headrockinc.com

Kōsuke Toyohara (豊原 功補, Toyohara Kōsuke; born 25 September 1965) is a Japanese actor and singer who has appeared in more than 80 films since 1982. He serves as head representative of Headrock Inc.

== Career ==
Toyohara graduated from Nakano High School (part-time). He began appearing on television in his teenage years but primarily established himself as an actor through V-cinema. He starred in the famous series Long vacation in 1996 as Sugisaki.

Toyohara later appeared in Junji Sakamoto's films, such as Aegis and Chameleon. In 2007, he won the Best Actor Award at the 5th Monaco International Film Festival for Cinderella Formula. In 2012, he starred in the film A Gentle Rain Falls for Fukushima. In 2017, he planned, wrote, directed and starred in his first stage production of the theatrical comedy Meijin Chōji. In February 2018, he went public with his affair with Kyōko Koizumi, with whom he had been working closely for a long time, despite being married and with children.

== Selected filmography ==
=== Films ===
Year	Title	Role	Notes	Ref.
1989	Godzilla vs. Biollante			
1991	Godzilla vs. King Ghidorah			
1992	Mr. Baseball	Yamashita	American film	
2005	Into the Sun	Fudomyo-o	American film	
2006	Unholy Women	Akira Tasaki		
2007	Sad Vacation			
2008	Komori Seikatsu Kojo Club			
2008	Chameleon			
2014	Bilocation			
2015	A Sower of Seeds 2	Tsumori		
2020	Deliver Us From Evil	Koraeda		
2021	A Family	Masatoshi Katō		
2022	Tombi: Father and Son			
2022	The Fish Tale			
2023	September 1923			
2023	Kyrie			
2024	Sakura	Kōsuke Kajiyama		
2024	The Young Strangers	Ryosuke		
2025	Strangers in Kyoto	Taro Ueda		

=== Television ===
Year	Title	Role	Notes	Ref.
1983	Tokugawa Ieyasu	Young Ii Naomasa	Taiga drama	
1996	Long Vacation	Sugisaki Tetsuya		
2008	Innocent Love			
2010	Bad Guy		South Korean television series	
2012	Taira no Kiyomori	Taira no Tadamasa	Taiga drama	
2015	Doraemon Haha ni Naru: Ōyama Nobuyo Monogatari	Keisuke Sagawa		
2016	Midnight Diner: Tokyo Stories	Sugisaki Tetsuya		
2022	Tokyo Vice		American television series	
2025	Gannibal Season 2	Kinji Gotō		
