= Ring of Curse =

- Theatrical release poster
- Kanji: ゴメンナサイ
- Revised Hepburn: Gomen Nasai
- Directed by: Mari Asato
- Screenplay by: Yoichi Minamikawa; Mari Asato
- Based on: Gomen Nasai by Yuka Hidaka
- Produced by: Daichi Tsukinari; Yoshihiro Yanagihara; Tomoharu Kusunoki; Akira Naramoto
- Starring: Airi Suzuki; Miyabi Natsuyaki; Momoko Tsugunaga
- Production companies: ASCII Media Works; Thanks Lab; VAP
- Distributed by: Thankslab
- Release date: October 29, 2011 (Japan)
- Running time: 94 minutes
- Country: Japan
- Language: Japanese

Ring of Curse, released in Japan as Gomen Nasai (Japanese: ゴメンナサイ; lit. "I'm Sorry"), is a 2011 Japanese horror film directed by Mari Asato. It is based on the 2011 cell phone novel Gomen Nasai by Yuka Hidaka. The film stars the Japanese idol girl group Buono! The film was released in theaters nationwide in Japan on October 29, 2011.

== Plot ==
A girl, Yuka Hidaka, attends school with a black-haired girl named Hinako Kurohane. Kurohane gets great grades in school, but is constantly labeled as a black sheep, as she is regarded as strange and unworldly to others at school and in public, and neglected by her parents who favor her kid sister, Kana over her at home. One day, Kurohane finds out that she has cancer, but still, her mother does not care. Kurohane curses Kana, who starts having trouble breathing and dies within a month as a result of the curse. Kurohane attempts the same with her mother but proves to no effect, so she enters a competition to improve her skills.

Her school life did not go so well because her classmates led by class president Sonada Shiori were mean to her, and often became a victim of their cruel bullying. She saw her opportunity for revenge when she was selected to write a script for a play in the school festival. She started cursing her class mates one by one. The only one that realized the curse was Yuka. She tried to stop Kurohane by talking to her, but to no avail. Kurohane's curse was also discovered by Sonada, whom she wanted to kill, so she tried a different way to kill her. One day, Sonada transferred to another school, but appeared several days later to kill Kurohane, and then killed herself, not because she wanted to, but because she was cursed by Kurohane. At that point, Kurohane's curses were so strong that a person would lose command and kill herself. The new source Kurohane used to place curses appeared in the form of text messages. She also sent a text to Yuka, but she never read it.

Time passed and Yuka was with her new classmates, telling them the story of Kurohane. They stole Yuka's cell phone and saw the text message Kurohane had sent to her, including Yuka. Then, one by one, Yuka's classmates started dying, leaving Yuka alone. And that is when she ultimately realizes that the only way to save herself is to get more and more people to read the words of Kurohane. She killed people randomly, so Yuka wrote a short story with Kurohane's words in it and posted it online, increasing her time to live.

== Cast ==
- Airi Suzuki as Yuka Hidaka
- Miyabi Natsuyaki as Hinako Kurohane
- Momoko Tsugunaga as Shiori Sonoda
- Chisato Okai as Chika's sister
- Itsuki Sagara as Chiharu
- Arisa Komiya as Yoko Fujita
- Tomomi Miyashita as female teacher
- Riko Matsumura (松村理子)
- Karen Ishida (石田佳蓮)
- Chihiro Nagase (永瀬千裕)
- Airi Suzuki (鈴木愛吏)
- Yoko Kita (喜多陽子)
- Nami Isogai (磯貝奈美)
- Ayame Iwasaki (岩崎あやめ)
- Taiki Yamazaki
- Takeru Ogawa (小川尊)
- Shoko Nakahara (中原翔子)
- Hiroaki Kawatsure (川連廣明)

== Production ==
Author Yuka Hidaka originally published the story online on the website Maho no iLand in 2011 as a cell phone novel. Over 800,000 people subscribed to the story. ASCII Media Works announced in a press release on July 11, 2011 that the novel would receive a live-action adaptation starring the members of the Japanese idol girl group Buono!, consisting of Momoko Tsugunaga, Miyabi Natsuyaki, and Airi Suzuki, in their debut starring film.

The film was directed by Mari Asato. The theme song of the film is "Deep Mind" by Buono!.

== Reception ==
Mark Schilling from The Japan Times described the beginning of the film with a "standard issue 'bully the strange girl in class' story line", but mentioned that it takes a "scarily fresh turn" when the bullied character takes revenge on her classmates.
