= Partenza (EP) =

- Regular edition cover

EP by Buono!
- Released: August 10, 2011 (JP)
- Genre: Pop
- Label: Zetima

Buono! chronology
| The Best Buono! (2010) | Partenza (2011) | Sherbet (2012) |

Singles from Partenza
- 1. "Zassou no Uta" Released: February 2, 2011; 2. "Natsu Dakara!" Released: July 20, 2011

Partenza is Buono!'s first major label EP. It was released by their new label Zetima on August 10, 2011, a week after its 30-second promotional video. The first press edition included a photo card. It reached #21 on Oricon's weekly chart, a new low for the band.

== CD track listing ==
1. "partenza~Let's Go!!!~"
2. "Zassou no Uta"
3. "FrankincenseΨ"
4. "My Alright Sky"
5. "Natsu Dakara"
6. "Kia Ora Gracias Arigato"
7. "Juicy He@rt"
8. "1/3 no Junjou na Kanjou" (Siam Shade cover)
