= Pizza-La =

Japanese pizza chain

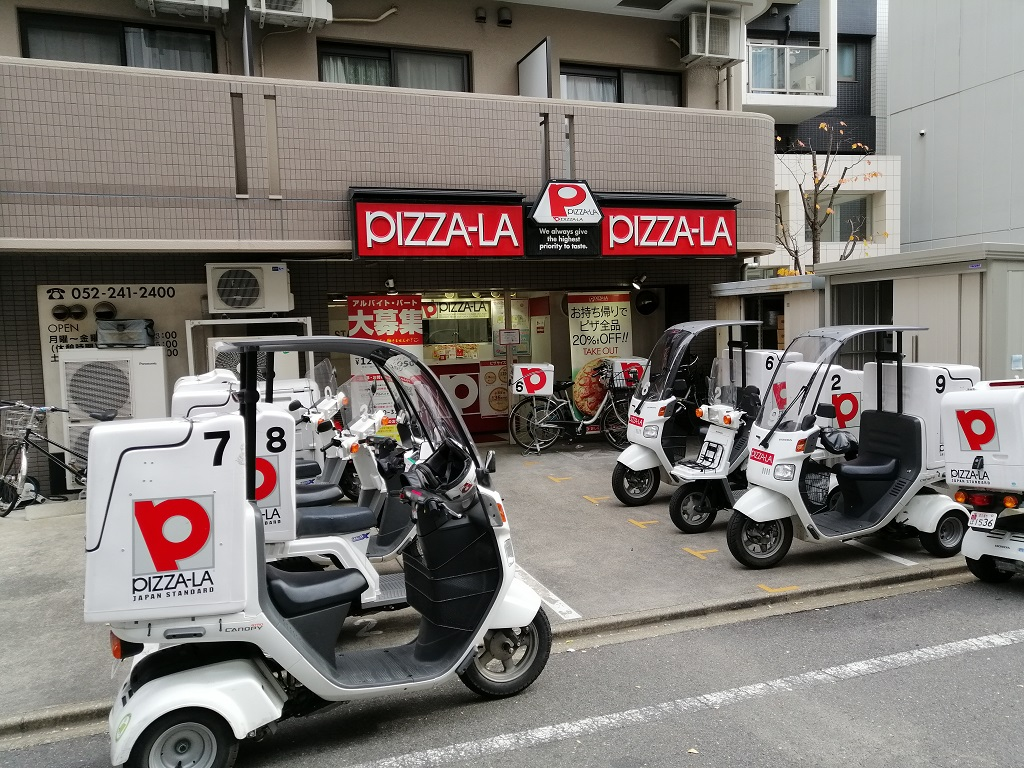
- Pizza-La store in Nagoya with delivery vehicles
- Native name: ピザーラ
- Romanized name: Pizāra
- Founded: April 1, 1980
- Headquarters: Zenkaren Building (全菓連ビル, Zenkaren biru) in Minami Aoyama, Minato, Tokyo, Japan
- Website: www.pizza-la.co.jp

Pizza-La (ピザーラ, Pizāra) is a Japanese pizza delivery chain. It is the second largest pizza chain in Japan, after Domino's Pizza. The company has its headquarters in the Zenkaren Building (全菓連ビル, Zenkaren Biru) in Minami Aoyama, Minato, Tokyo. The name of the company was created by combining the words "pizza" and "Godzilla".

The company's slogan is "All the taste and toppings you want on a pizza, straight from our oven to your door!" Their mascot is Pizza-La-kun.

== History ==
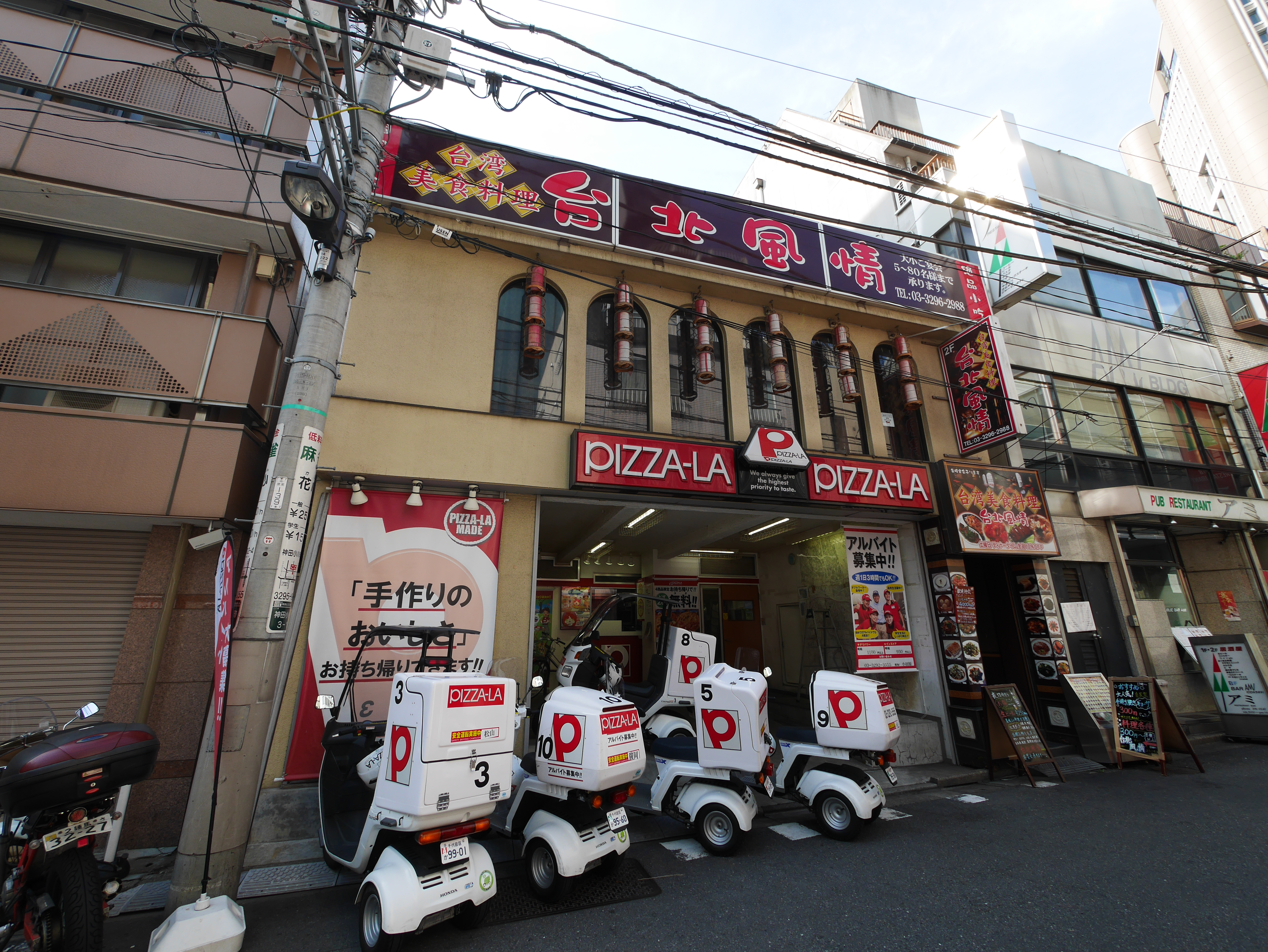
Store in Chiyoda, Tokyo

Hidenori Asano, the chairman of Four Seeds Inc. (Pizza-La's parent company), was inspired to create the chain after viewing E.T. the Extra-Terrestrial in which Domino's Pizza featured. Asano had previously planned to start an offshoot of Domino's Pizza itself as a directly managed store, rather than one managed by a franchise. However, Domino's had already applied for franchising rights in Japan in 1985 and had already started business. Asano then decided to establish his own chain, and in April 1987 the first Pizza-La store opened in the Mejiro district of Toshima, Tokyo. Its expansion into the national market began in December 1989 starting with the store in the Tsuchizaki district of Akita, Akita. Commercials for Pizza-La began in 1991 using the slogan "ピザーラお届け!!" ("Pizza-La Delivery!!") incorporating a variety of actors.

By 2012, Pizza-La had opened 552 stores in Japan; by 2015, the chain had expanded into all prefectures excluding Aomori, Fukui, Tottori, Shimane, Kagawa, Ehime, Kochi, Saga and Ōita prefectures.

== Stores ==
While Pizza-La is primarily a delivery service, take-out stores called Pizza-La Style have operated since 2020, and are mostly located inside supermarkets.

The Fuji-Q Highland theme park has a Pizza-La store next to the "Tondemina" pendulum ride, which offers a themed pizza with sausages placed to make it resemble the rotating disk. Due to the attraction's resemblance to a pizza, the Pizza-La logo is printed onto the pendulum arm that supports the disk.

In addition, on October 5, 2006, the KidZania branch in Tokyo first provided a pizza preparation activity sponsored by Pizza-La.

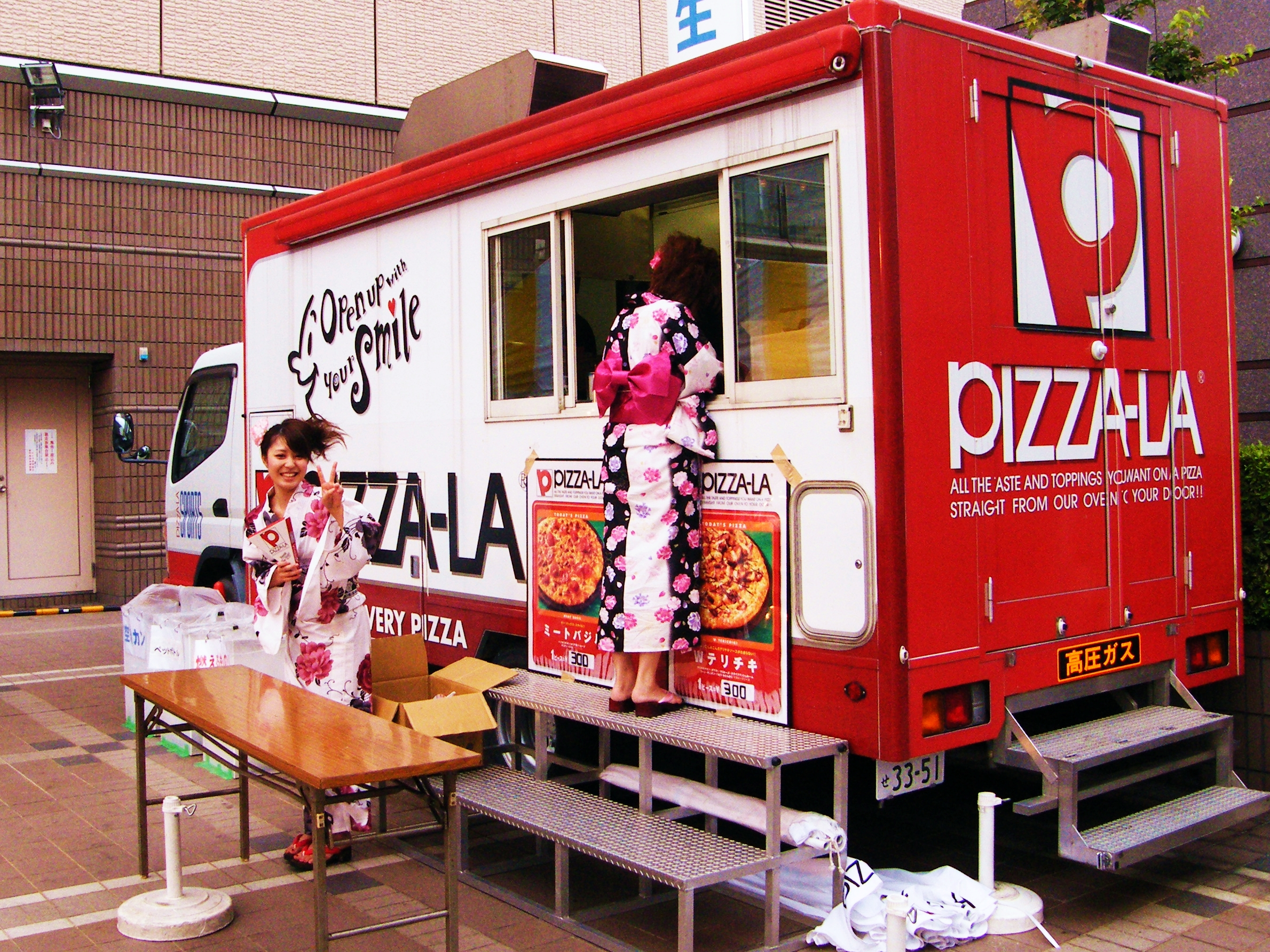
A Pizza-La food truck

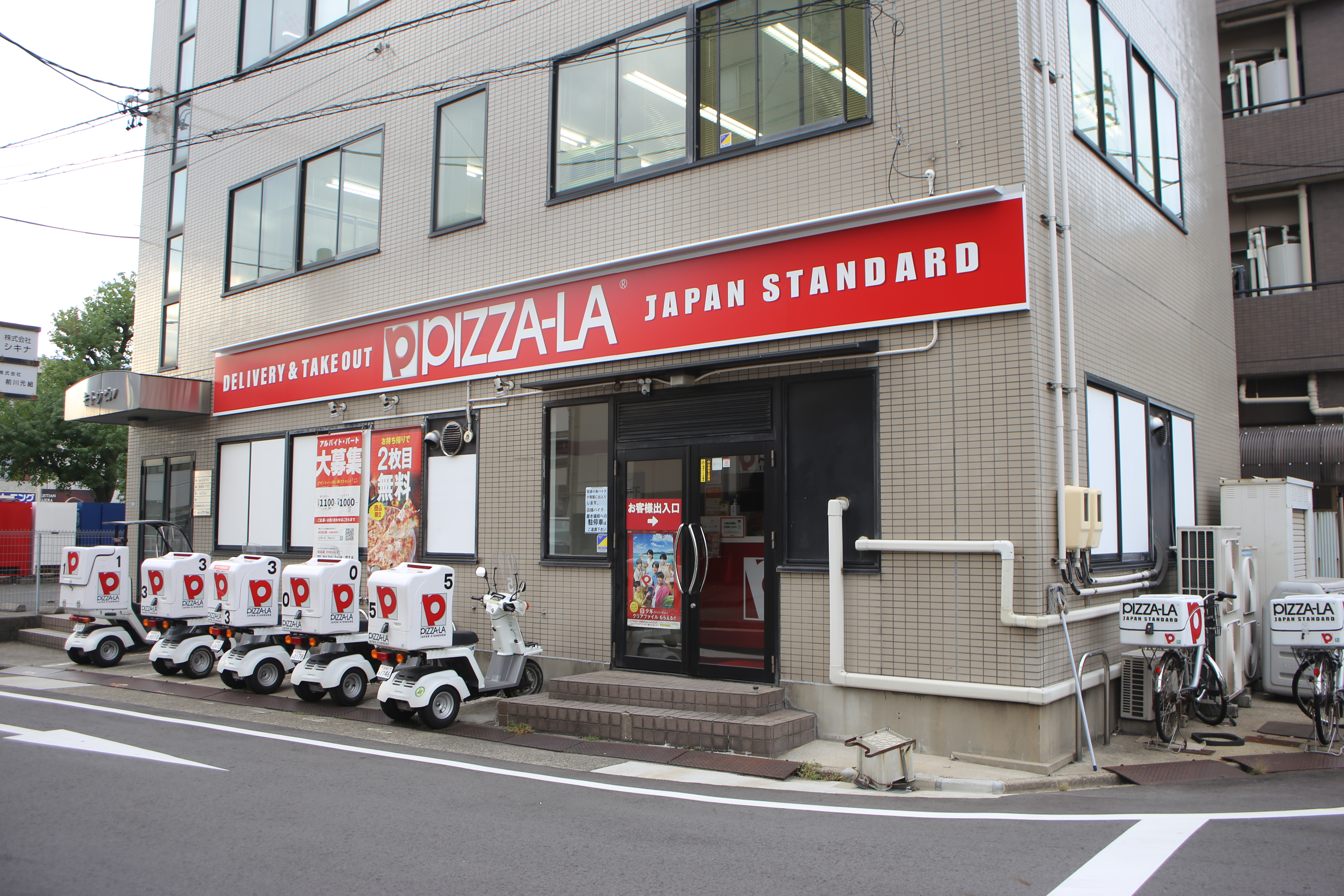

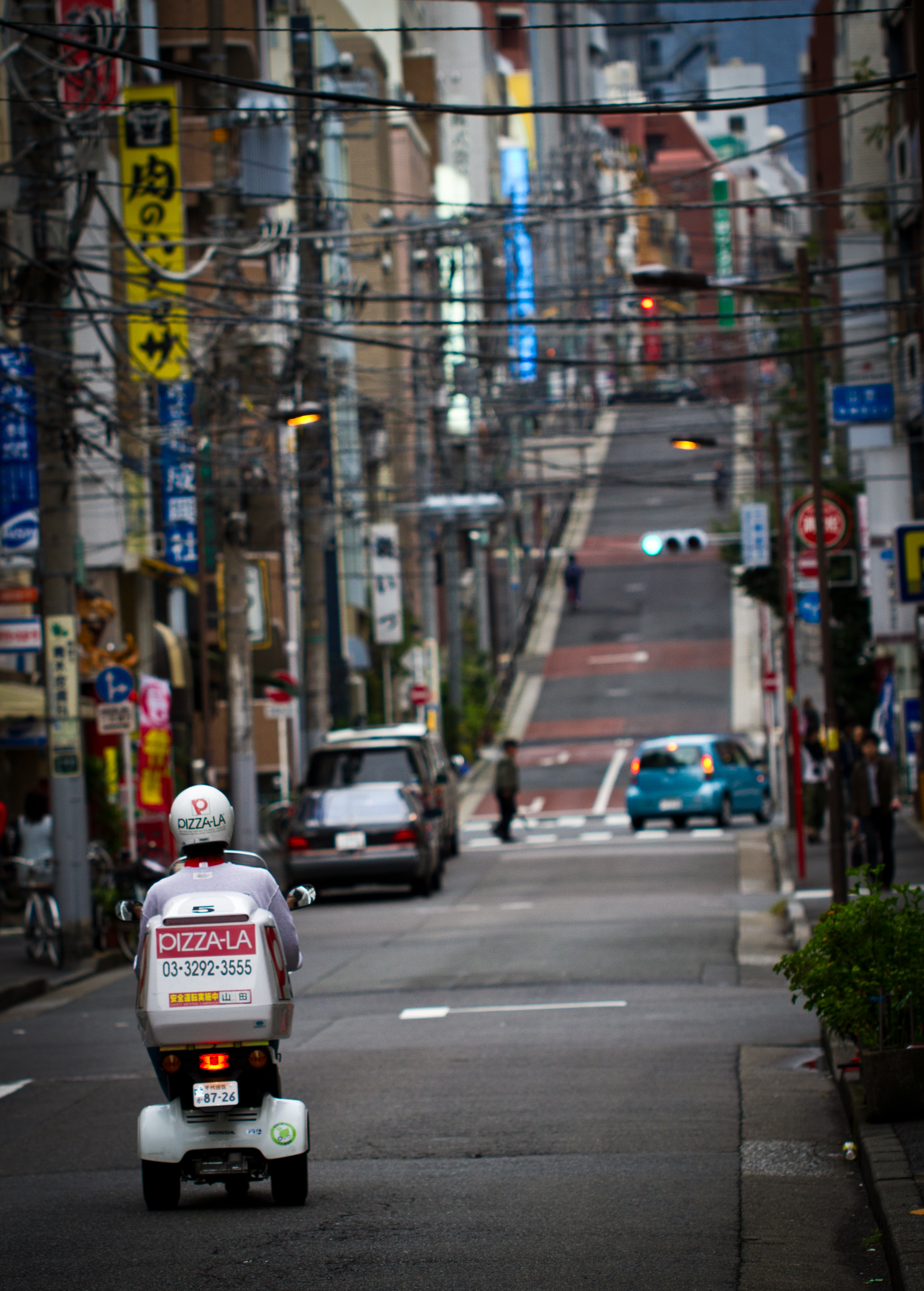
Deliveryman in Chiyoda, Tokyo

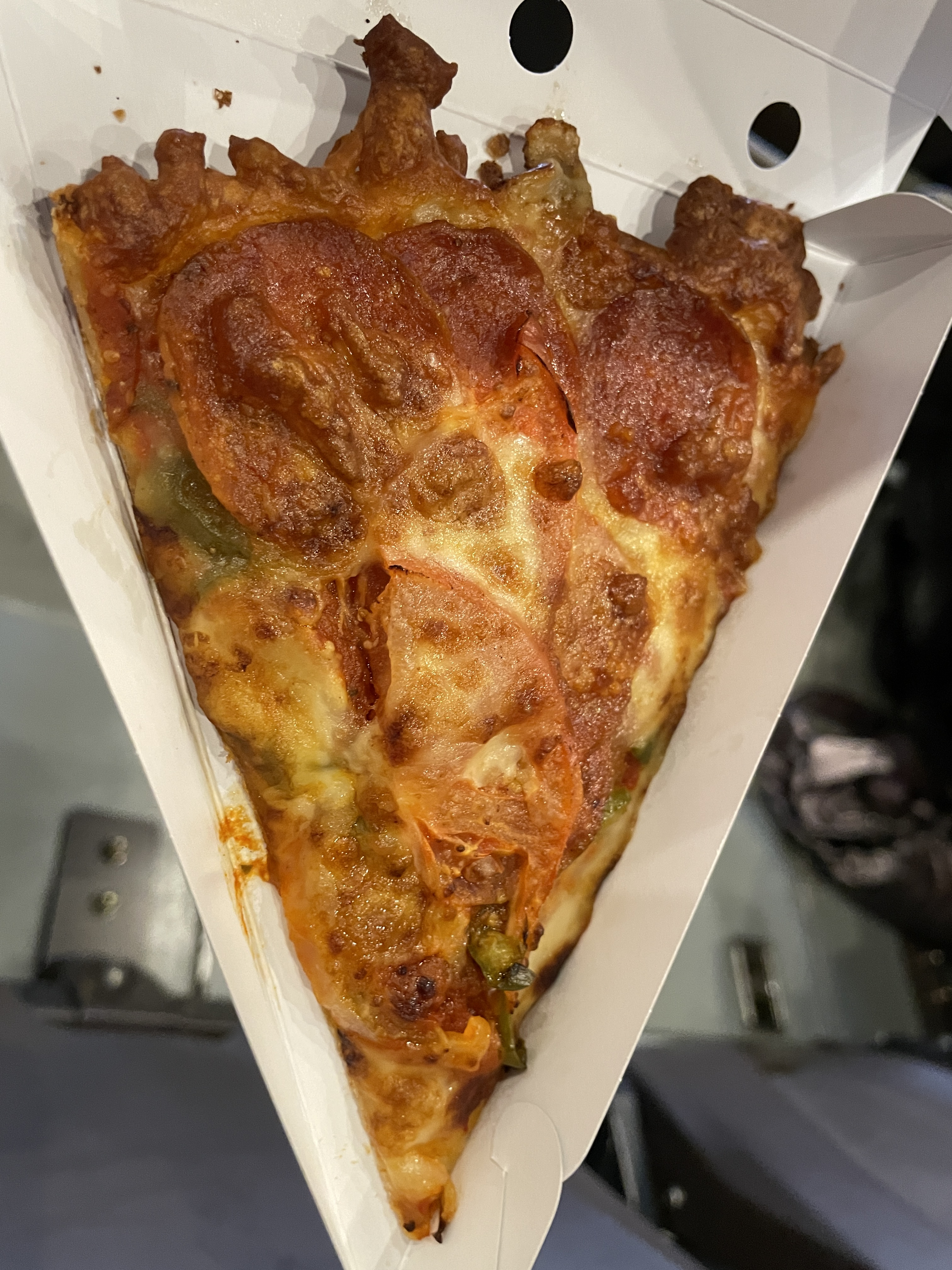

== Food trucks ==
Food trucks called Pizza-La Caravan operate outside of the chain's normal delivery range. They are known to go to remote regions in Japan, including to the Izu Islands.

== Sporting events ==
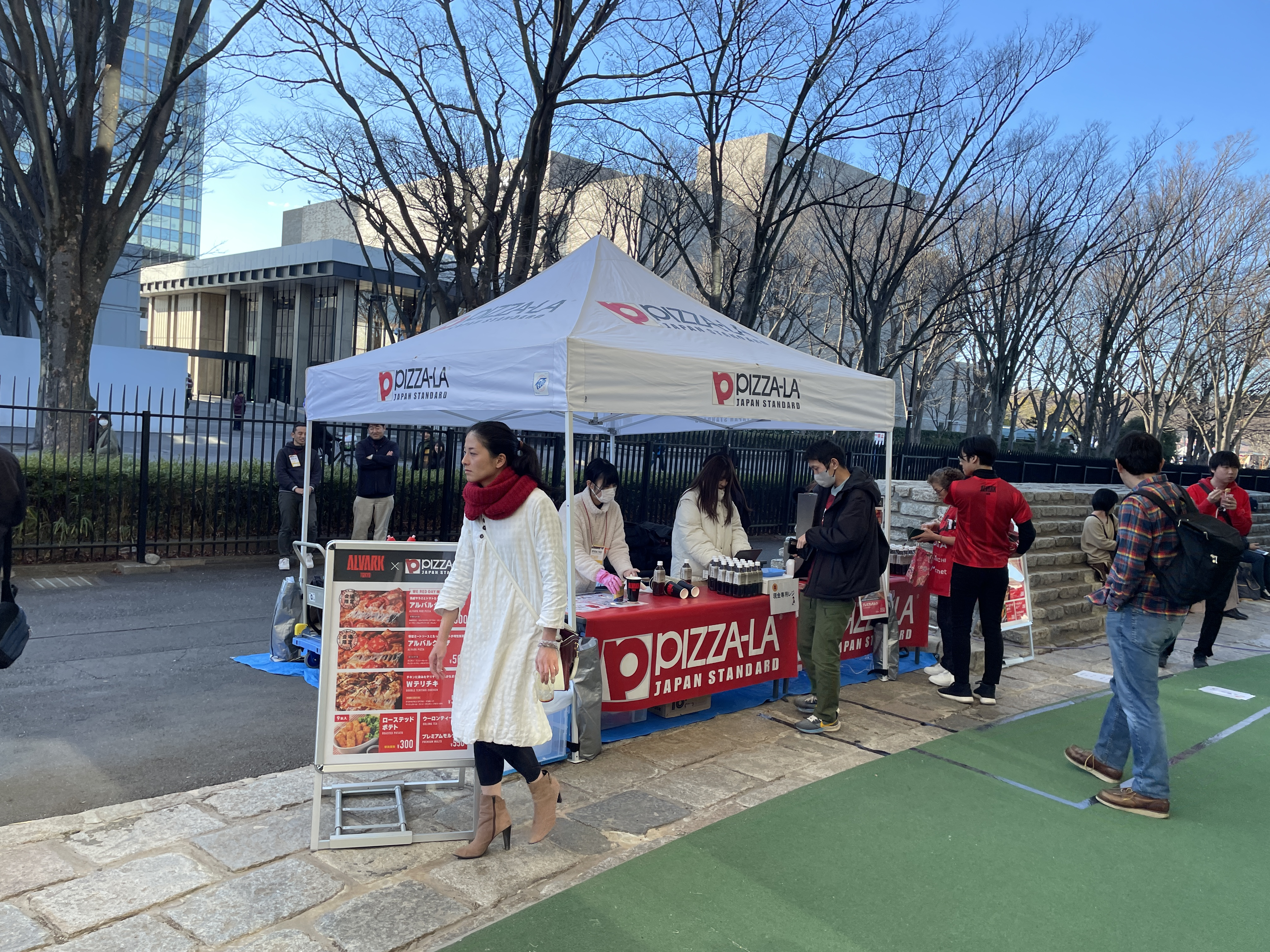
Booth outside a B.League basketball match

Pizza-La is a former sponsor of Bowling Revolution P★League.

== Public health incident ==
On August 24, 2013, images in which two part-time employees of Pizza-La's Higashiyamato branch in Tokyo posed inside its sink and refrigerator were released onto the Internet. On the same day they were found to have gone viral on Twitter and several bulletin boards. The following day a public apology was made by the company, and the Higashiyamato branch was temporarily closed while disposal of preserved foods and disinfection of the sink and refrigerator began. As of August 30 the two employees were fired. The company that acted as a franchisee of the Higashiyamato branch had lost consumer trust due to the incident and suspended business in October 2015. On July 27, 2016, the company began bankruptcy proceedings with the Tokyo District Court.

It was also found that said employees had released images of themselves squatting on display shelves and inside refrigeration cabinets at the Seiyu supermarket in Ōme, Tokyo a day before the incident, on August 23.

== In popular culture ==
- In Yakuza 0, there is a substory where Kazuma Kiryu orders a special combination pizza from Pizza-La and delivers it to a foreign woman after misunderstanding her accent when she asks for help getting a visa.
- In the anime, My Hero Academia, the police pretended to be a delivery man for Pizza-La before busting in to the League of Villains Hideout.
