= Bilocation (film) =

- Poster
- Directed by: Mari Asato
- Screenplay by: Mari Asato
- Story by: Haruka Hojo
- Produced by: Naohisa Yamashita; Masahiko Mizoguchi; Kenichiro Kimura; Hiroshi Yamamoto; Kagetsu Junichi; Eisuke Uwagi
- Starring: Asami Mizukawa; Kento Senga; Sho Takada; Kenichi Takitō; Yōsuke Asari
- Cinematography: Yuka Tsukinaga
- Edited by: Masaki Murakami
- Production companies: Kadokawa; Pony Canyon; Avex Entertainment; Hakuhodo; Toei Channel; Digital Frontier
- Distributed by: Kadokawa
- Release dates: October 21, 2013 (Tokyo Film Festival); January 18, 2014 (Japan)
- Running time: 119 minutes
- Country: Japan
- Language: Japanese
- Box office: ¥16.5 million (Japan); HK$533,000 (Hong Kong)

Bilocation (Japanese: バイロケーション, Hepburn: Bairokēshon) is a 2013 Japanese science fiction psychological horror film directed by Mari Asato. The film made its North American premiere at LA EigaFest 2014.

== Cast ==
- Asami Mizukawa as Shinobu Takamura/Shinobu Kirimura
- Kento Senga as Mitarai Takumi
- Sho Takada as Yoshie Kaga
- Kenichi Takitō as Takashi Kano
- Yōsuke Asari as Masaru Komura
- Wakana Sakai as Mayumi Isii
- Kosuke Toyohara as Makoto Iitsuka
- Chûkichi Kubo as Sakaki
- Maiko as Sayuri Mitamura/Sayuri Iizuka
- Hiroko Uchida

== Reception ==
As of 22 January 2014, the film had grossed ¥16.5 million in Japan. It has grossed HK$533,000 in Hong Kong.
