= Noriko Nakagoshi =

Japanese actress (born 1979)

Noriko Nakagoshi (中越典子, Nakagoshi Noriko; born December 31, 1979 in Saga, Saga, Japan) is a Japanese actress.

== Biography ==
Nakagoshi debuted as a model for ViVi magazine in 1999. She began acting the same year, making her acting debut as Midori Sato in the show Tengoku no Kiss. Her acting attracted her great attention and from there, she moved onto bigger roles. Her breakthrough role came in the 2003 NHK asadora, Kokoro, where she played the lead, Kokoro Suenaga. Since then she has acted in many dramas, films, and stage plays.

Since 2014, she has been married to actor Masaru Nagai.

== Select filmography ==
=== Films ===
- Strawberry Shortcakes (2006) as Chihiro
- Unholy Women (2006)
- Apartment 1303 (2007)
- Sugata Sanshiro (2007)
- Town of Evening Calm, Country of Cherry Blossoms (2007)
- 4 Shimai Tantei Dan (2008)
- Orochi: Blood (2008) as Risa Monzen
- The Lone Scalpel (2010) as Shōko Ōkawa
- Sekigahara (2017) as Hanano
- Roleless (2022)
- Shinpei (2025)

=== Television ===
- Hero (2001)
- Trick 2 (2002)
- Kokoro (2003), Kokoro Suenaga
- Pride (2004)
- Yoshitsune (2005), Kenreimon-in Tokuko
- Byakkotai (2007), Yamamoto Yaeko
- Tokusou 9 (2018-present)
- Kishiryu Sentai Ryusoulger (2019)
- The Sunflower Disappeared in the Rain (2022)
- Boogie Woogie (2023), Kinu Nishino
- No.1 Sentai Gozyuger (2025)
