= Sherbet (EP) =

SHERBET
- Regular Edition cover

EP by Buono!
- Released: August 22, 2012 (JP)
- Genre: J-pop
- Label: Zetima

Buono! chronology
partenza (2011)	SHERBET (2012)

Singles from Sherbet
- 1. "Hatsukoi Cider / Deep Mind" Released: January 18, 2012

Music video
- "Never Gonna Stop!" on YouTube

Alternative cover
- Limited Edition cover

Sherbet is the second mini-album by the Japanese girl group Buono!. It was released on August 22, 2012.

== Background ==
The album was released in two versions: Limited Edition (CD+DVD) and Regular Edition (CD only). Never Gonna Stop! is the ending theme for the Japan-based sports program, Bowling Revolution P★League.

== Track listing ==
CD
No.	Title	Lyrics	Music	Arrangement	Length
1.	"Fever" (FEVER)	Deco*27	Deco*27	Deco*27; Konnie-PLASMO'-Aoki	4:01
2.	"Go! Go! Gōda" (GO!GO! ゴーダ)	HA; AKIRASTARA	HA; AKIRASTARA	AKIRASTAR	1:53
3.	"Hatsukoi Cider" (初恋サイダー（Album version）)	NOBE	Shihori	Miyanaga Jiro	3:40
4.	"Mirai Drive" (未来ドライブ)	HA	Matsui Nozomu; HA	Konnie-PLASMO'-Aoki	4:11
5.	"Believe" (BELIEVE★★★)	HA	HA	Konnie-PLASMO'-Aoki	3:40
6.	"Natsu no Hoshizora" (夏の星空)	HA	Matsuki Nozomu; HA	tasuku; Konnie-PLASMO'-Aoki	4:39
7.	"Never Gonna Stop!" (Never gonna stop!)	HA	AKIRASTAR	AKIRASTAR	4:11

Limited Edition DVD
No.	Title	Length
1.	"Never Gonna Stop! (Close-up Buono! Ver. Type 01)" (Never gonna stop!（Close-up BUONO! Ver.-type.01-）)
2.	"2012 France Kōen Micchaku Document" (2012 フランス公演密着ドキュメント)
