= Shiho Takano =

Japanese actress (born 1979)

- 高野 志穂
- Born: October 21, 1979 (age 46); Tokyo, Japan
- Occupation: Actress
- Years active: 2002–present
- Agent: Tom company
- Spouse: Yukiya Kitamura (m. 2013)
- Children: 2
- Website: Official profile

Shiho Takano (高野 志穂, Takano Shiho; born October 21, 1979, in Tokyo, Japan) is a Japanese actress who is represented by the talent agency, Tom company.

Takano's husband is actor Yukiya Kitamura.

== Filmography ==
=== TV series ===
Year	Title	Role	Notes	Ref.
2002	Sakura	Sakura Matsushita	Lead role; Asadora	
2003	Aka-chan o Sagase	Hina Kameyama	Lead role	
2004	Tsuma no Sotsugyōshiki	Rikako Kanzaki		
2005	Run Away Girl Nagareru Onna	Erika	Lead role	
2005	Yoshitsune	Episodes 27 and 31		
2005	Risō no Seikatsu	Aki Igarashi		
2007	Tōi Kuni Kara Kita Otoko	Kaori Yagawa		
2009	Shin Keishichō Sōsaikka 9 Kakari	Mamiko Takahashi	Episode 7	
2009	Kariya Keibu Series 7	Machiko Ogawa		
2010	Mitsuhiko Asami Series 36	Keimi Matsukawa		
2010	Ekkyō Sōsa 2	Atsuko Fukami		
2010	Tokyo Eki o Wasuremono Azukari-sho 4	Chiharu Manabe		
2011	Omiya-san Dai 8 Series	Yukari Mukai	Episode 4	
2012	Suspicion	Yuiko Shirakawa		
2012	AIBOU: Tokyo Detective Duo	Ayako Shinoda	Season 11, Episode 8	
2013	Hanchō 6: Keishichō Asaka Han	Yoko Katase	Episode 7	
2013	Keiji 110-kiro	Yasuko Umetani	Episode 2	
2013	Honey Trap	Emi Kobayashi	Episodes 7 to Final Episode	
2014	Team: Keishichō Tokubetsu Hanzai Sōsa Honbu	Kayo Hoshino	Episode 2	
2014	Watashi wa Daikō-ya! 3	Emi		

=== Films ===
Year	Title	Role	Notes	Ref.
2002	Color of Life Theme 1: Family	Girl hitting her father		
2002	Itai Futari	Keiko		
2003	Neko	Girl looking for cat	Lead role	
2003	Fukumimi	Ke Nobunaga		
2006	Nihon no Jitensha Dorobō	Snack hostess		
2010	Asakusa-dō Yoiyume Tan	Rinko Furumido		
2012	Mr. Jonfun!! Watashi no Star wa Chicken Otoko?!			
2010	Asakusa-dō Yoiyume Tan	Rinko Furumido		
2025	Principal Examination	Shiina		
