= Pink Cres. =

Japanese female vocal group

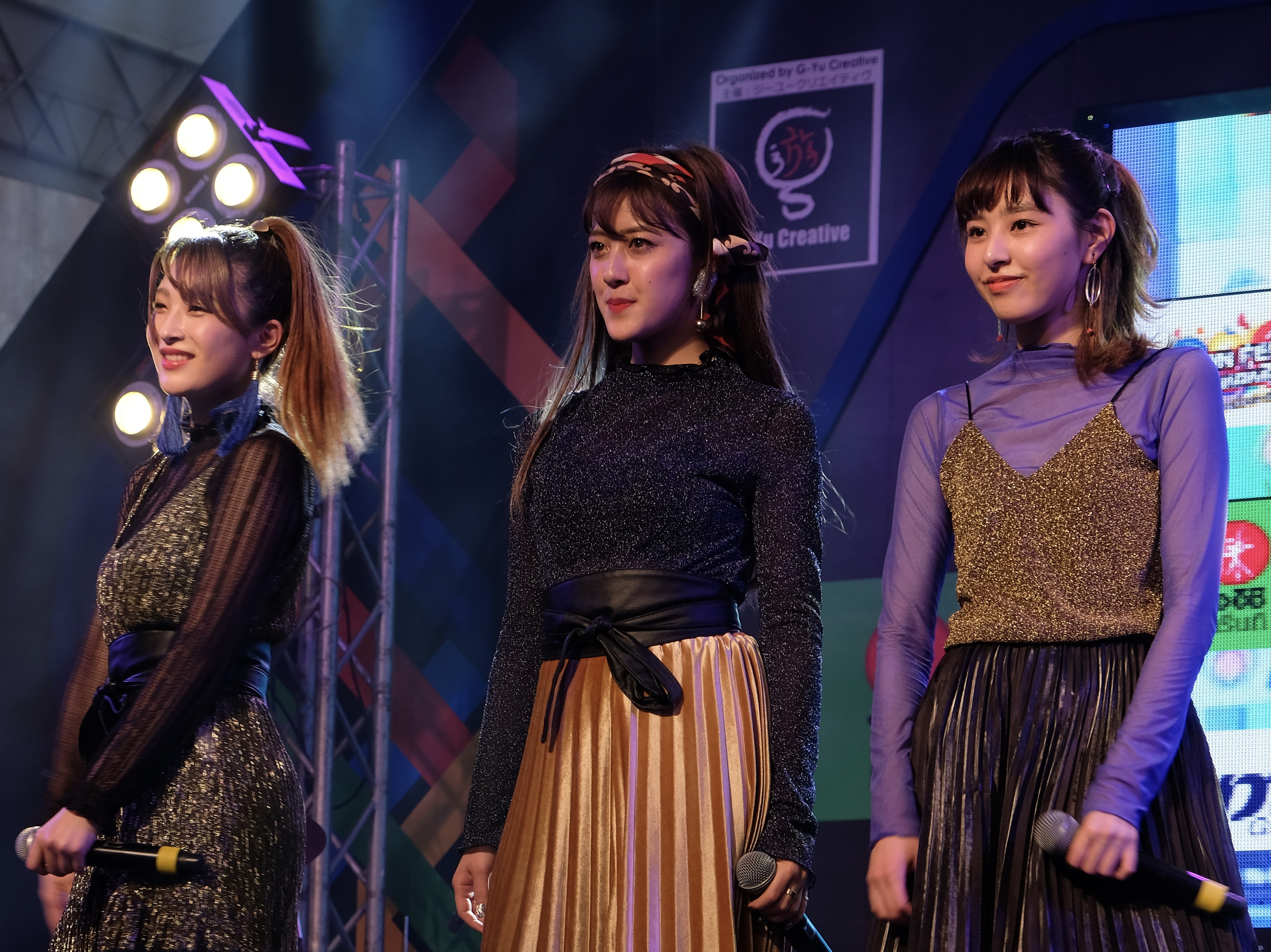
- Pink Cres. at Japan Expo Thailand 2017; From left to right: Nihei, Natsuyaki, and Kobayashi

Background information
- Origin: Tokyo, Japan
- Genres: J-pop
- Years active: 2016-2021
- Label: Up-Front Works
- Members: Miyabi Natsuyaki; Hikaru Kobayashi; Yūka Nihei
- Website: www.pinkcres.com

Pink Cres. (ピンククレス, Pinku Kuresu; stylized PINK CRES.) was a Japanese girl group formed by Up-Front Create in 2016. The group consisted of three members: Miyabi Natsuyaki, Hikaru Kobayashi, and Yūka Nihei.

Pink Cres. debuted in 2017 with the album Crescendo. They remained active until 2021, in which they disbanded.

== History ==
Miyabi Natsuyaki was a member of the Japanese idol group Berryz Kobo since 2004, and when the group went on indefinite hiatus in 2014, she decided to continue her singing career and held auditions for new members of a girl group in 2015. Hikaru Kobayashi and Yūka Nihei passed the audition, and they were announced as new group members in April 2016. They made their first public appearance at Buono!'s concert on August 25, 2016.

Pink Cres. released their debut studio album, Crescendo, on June 28, 2017, which also included music videos for the songs "Fun Fun Fun" and "Kirei Kawai Mirai." On June 27, 2018, Pink Cres. released the second studio album, Etcetera.

Pink Cres. was scheduled to release their third studio album, No Borders, on February 6, 2019, but it was postponed. On May 22, 2019, Pink Cres. released their first major double A-side single, "Tokyo Confusion" / "Uchū no Onna wa Amakunai."

On March 19, 2021, the group announced that they would be disbanding at the end of June. On June 30, 2021, the group formally disbanded, with Kobayashi and Nihei leaving Up-Front Create, and Natsuyaki staying with the agency as a soloist.

== Members ==
- Miyabi Natsuyaki (夏焼雅)
- Hikaru Kobayashi (小林ひかる)
- Yūka Nihei (二瓶有加)

== Discography ==
=== Studio albums ===
List of albums, with selected chart positions, sales figures and certifications
Title	Year	Details	Peak chart positions	Sales
Title	Year	Details	JPN	Sales
Crescendo	2017	Released: June 28, 2017; Label: Up-Front Works; Format: CD, digital download	150	—
Etcetera (えとせとら)	2018	Released: June 27, 2018; Label: Up-Front Works; Format: CD, digital download	66	—
"—" denotes releases that did not chart or were not released in that region.

=== Extended plays ===
List of extended plays, with selected chart positions, sales figures and certifications
Title	Year	Details	Peak chart positions	Sales
Title	Year	Details	JPN	Sales
Soleil	2020	Released: October 7, 2020; Label: Zetima; Format: CD, digital download	58	—
"—" denotes releases that did not chart or were not released in that region.

=== Singles ===
==== Major ====
List of singles, with selected chart positions, sales figures and certifications
Title	Year	Peak chart positions	Sales	Album
Title	Year	JPN	Sales	Album
"Tokyo Confusion" (トウキョウ・コンフュージョン) / "Uchū no Onna wa Amakunai" (宇宙の女は甘くない)	2019	13	—	Soleil
"Roulette" (ルーレット)	2020	28	JPN: 2,141	Soleil
"—" denotes releases that did not chart or were not released in that region.

==== Promotional ====
Title	Year	Peak chart positions	Sales	Album
Title	Year	JPN	Sales	Album
"Sweet Girl's Night"	2017	—	—	Ecetera
"—" denotes releases that did not chart or were not released in that region.

=== Video Albums ===
List of media, with selected chart positions
Title	Album details	Peak positions	
Title	Album details	JPN DVD	JPN Blu-ray
M-line Special 2021～Make a Wish!～	Collaboration with Airi Suzuki & Karin Miyamoto; Released: August 18, 2021 (JPN); Label: Up-Front Works; Formats: DVD	—	—
M-line Special 2021～Make a Wish!～ on 20th June	Collaboration with Sayumi Michishige, Reina Tanaka & Karin Miyamoto; Released: November 3, 2021 (JPN); Label: Up-Front Works; Formats: DVD	—	—
PINK CRES. LAST LIVE ～LOVE YOU PINK CLASS.～	Released: November 17, 2021 (JPN); Label: Up-Front Works; Formats: Blu-ray	—	—
