= Sakura (TV series) =

- Genre: Drama
- Written by: Kumiko Tabuchi
- Directed by: Kazuhiko Shimizu; Koichi Fujisawa; Jō Satō; Akihiro Kimura; Kazuki Miki
- Starring: Shiho Takano; Yukiyoshi Ozawa; Miyoko Asada; Goro Noguchi; Ken Teraizumi; Hiromi Ōta; Thane Camus; Meiko Nakamura; Asei Kobayashi; Taketoshi Naito; Keiko Tsushima; Tōru Emori
- Narrated by: Hideji Ōtaki
- Country of origin: Japan
- Original language: Japanese
- No. of episodes: 156

Production
- Running time: 15 minutes
- Production company: NHK

Original release
- Network: NHK
- Release: April 1 – September 28, 2002

Sakura (さくら; Japanese pronunciation: [saꜜ.kɯ.ɾa]) is a Japanese serialized morning television drama series that was broadcast on NHK. It aired a total of 156 episodes from April 1 to September 28, 2002. Each episode of the series was 15 minutes long, airing every morning except Sunday. It chronicles the life of Matsushita Sakura, a Japanese-American from Hawaii who moves to a small town in Japan to be an assistant language teacher for Japanese middle-school students.

== Cast ==
- Shiho Takano - Elizabeth Sakura Matsushita (primary character)
- Hideji Otaki - James Takero Matsushita (Sakura's grandfather, narrator)
- Yukiyoshi Ozawa - Keisuke Katsuragi
- Ken Teraizumi - Ichiro Matsushita
- Hiromi Ōta as Kyoko Matsushita (Sakura's mother)
- Keiko Tsushima - Toshiko Matsushita
- Kaori Itakura - Momo Matsushita (Sakura's sister)
- Thane Camus - Robert Hoffman (Sakura's fiancé)

== Plot ==
Sakura Matsushita, a Sansei (third-generation) Japanese-American living in Hawaii, comes to Japan to live with her grandparents. Later, she moves because she has to teach English to Japanese middle-school students as an assistant language teacher.

=== Episodes 1–13 ===
Robert proposes to Sakura and she accepts on one condition: she wants to go to Japan before she gets married, as it was her dream to go and see her Japanese side. Her father doesn't want her to go at first, but decides that she may go as long as she teaches English to the Japanese students. When she gets to Japan, she sees her grandparents; her grandfather acts like he doesn't want Sakura there at his home, but actually he does. The principal of the school that she is supposed to be working at claims that she must go to another school and teach English there. Since she promised her father that she will go to Japan and teach, she moves out of her grandparents' house and goes to the other school. The male health/Gym teacher will be living in the same house as her, which the school lends to them for free.

Sakura goes to a small restaurant owned by Americans who speak Japanese and befriends them.

The other English teacher at her school barely knows English and Sakura does not appreciate the fact that he teaches. She wants to teach the English language in a more interesting way so the students will have fun learning. All the other teachers do not accept that way of teaching, so Sakura gets upset and leaves the school. She lies to her grandparents that school is closed and stays at their home. The health/Gym teacher calls to see where she is and discovers that she was lying to her grandparents. Her grandfather tells her that she will go back to the school whether she quits or stays.

=== Episodes 14–17 ===
Sakura goes back to the school, apologizes for missing school and gets back on schedule. She becomes very close to the health/Gym teacher, and a rumor spreads that they are going out, with the students drawing hearts on the chalk board. The nurse likes the health/Gym teacher and is upset at the situation; the rest of the teachers are upset because they believe that if they are going out, they will not concentrate on work. Sakura tells everyone that she has no interest in him by showing everyone the picture of Robert and her. The Gym/Health teacher and Sakura must go talk to the student's parents, so they go together at first, but later decide that they would finish much quicker if they went to each house separately. Sakura gets lost, but with some help from the townsfolk, she finds the first house she is supposed to go to, a candle shop. She meets the entire family and enjoys the big old-fashioned house. The family offers to let Sakura live with them and she agrees.

=== Episodes 18–25 ===
Sakura is enjoying her stay, but one of her students and his mother are upset. The info gets out and the other students at school talk about it. The younger sister comes back home saying that she is getting a divorce with her husband. She is expecting to stay in her old room at her parents' house until she notices Sakura in there.

Preceded by Honmamon	Asadora; 1 April 2002 – 28 September 2002	Succeeded by Manten
