= Kokoro (TV series) =

- Genre: Drama
- Written by: Yumiko Aoyagi
- Directed by: Takashi Komatsu; Toshiaki Iso
- Starring: Noriko Nakagoshi; Ran Itō; Tōru Nakamura; Ryohei Hirota; Naomi Zaizen; Akira Terao
- Narrated by: Keiko Kishi
- Opening theme: Kokoro by Anri Kumaki
- Composer: Ryō Yoshimata
- Country of origin: Japan
- Original language: Japanese
- No. of episodes: 156

Production
- Executive producer: Akimasa Oka
- Producer: Ren Takahashi
- Running time: 15 minutes
- Production company: NHK

Original release
- Network: NHK
- Release: March 31 – September 27, 2003

Kokoro (こころ) is a Japanese television drama series and the 68th Asadora series, following Manten. It premiered on March 31, 2003 and concluded on September 27, 2003.

== Cast ==
=== Suenaga and Asakura family ===
- Noriko Nakagoshi as Kokoro Asakura (her maiden name was Suenaga)
- Ran Itō as Misako Suenaga, Kokoro's mother
- Keiko Kishi as Izumi Kiyono, Kokoro's grandmother (also as narrator)
- Akira Terao as Takuro Suenaga, Kokoro's father
- Tōru Nakamura as Yusaku Asakura, Kokoro's husband
- Tomoka Kurokawa as Sachi Asakura, Yusaku and Kanna's daughter
- Ryohei Hirota as Yūta Asakura, Yusaku and Kanna's son
- Kōjirō Kusanagi as Yuri Asakura, Yusaku's father
- Akemi Omori as Haruko Asakura, Yusaku's mother
- Naomi Zaizen as Kanna Fujii, Yusaku's ex-wife

=== Hotta family ===
- Hiroshi Tamaki as Takumi Hotta, a fireworks craftsman
- Takeshi Onishi as Tadashi Hotta, Takumi's brother
- Taisaku Akino as Denzo Hotta, Takumi and Tadashi's father
- Yuka Itaya as Mariko Hotta, Tadashi's wife

=== Employees at Kiyokawa ===
- Hatsuo Yamaya as Tetsuo Tange, an eel chef at Kiyokawa
- Yukiko Shimizu as Yoshie Chino, a Kiyokawa waitress
- Kunikazu Katsumata as Yasuo Seino, a chef at Kiyokawa
- Moro Morooka as Jō Goi, a board chief
- Yoshitora Okamoto as Carlos Tanaka, a Japanese Brazilian employee at Kiyokawa

=== People in Asakusa ===
- Kenichi Nagira as Mantaro Yamamoto, the owner of Yamamoto-ya
- Eiko Koike as Towako Yamamoto, Mantaro's daughter and Kokoro's best friend
- Ryo Kato as Jiro Yamamoto, Mantaro's son and Towako's brother
- Moto Fuyuki as Tetsuo Ōba, the owner of Ōba-yu
- Mika Hada as Kasumi Ōba, Tetsuo's daughter and a heiress of Ōba-yu
- Takahiro Azuma as Katsuo Ōba, Kasumi's husband
- Rumiko Sogawa as Sumiko Ōba, Tetsuo's wife and Kasumi's mother
- Raita Ryu as Ikkoku Nakajima, the owner of Nakajima Fireworks
- Sadao Abe as Gin Nakajima, Ikkoku's son
- Hiroshi Inuzuka as Sadao Yoshikawa, a man who runs the tailor shop
- Papaya Suzuki as Kaoru Ochiai, a doctor and Yusaku's friend
- Yasukiyo Umeno as Isao Fujioka
- Masuyuki Shida as Tsutomu Fujioka, Isao's son
- Miki Matsumoto as Mayumi Sugii, a nurse

=== People in Yamakoshi village ===
- Kazuko Kato as Saori Uesugi, daughter of a fireworks factory manager
- Shinjirō Ehara as Eizō Uesugi, a fireworks factory owner
- Sachiko Sakurai as Yumeko Murakami, Tatsuzo's daughter
- Susumu Kurobe as Tatsuzo Murakami, a carp producer and Yumeko's father
- Sarutoki Minagawa as Mamoru Hoshikawa, Tatsuzo's sub-ordinate

=== Others ===
- Mayuko Takata as Ryōko Tachibana, a single mother and Kokoro's senior
- Nami Ichinohe as Rikako Tamakoshi, Kokoro's colleague
- Kaito Shiono as Kazuhiro Tachibana, Ryōko's son
- Tsutomu Isobe as Kazunari Tamakoshi, Rikako's father
- Rumiko Koyanagi as Koemi Chino, Yoshie's sister

Preceded by Manten	Asadora; March 31, 2003 – September 27, 2003	Succeeded by Teruteru Kazoku
