= Hatsukoi Cider / Deep Mind =

- Regular Edition cover

Single by Buono!

from the album Sherbet
- Released: January 18, 2012 (Japan)
- Genre: J-pop, rock, pop
- Label: Zetima
- Songwriters: Hatsukoi Cider: NOBE, Shihori; Deep Mind: Onoriku, AKIRASTAR

Buono! singles chronology
| "Natsu Dakara!" (2011) | "Hatsukoi Cider / Deep Mind" (2012) |

Music videos
- Hatsukoi Cider on YouTube
- Deep Mind on YouTube

Alternative cover
- Limited Edition cover

Alternative cover
- Single V cover

Alternative cover
- Event V cover

"Hatsukoi Cider" (初恋サイダー; lit. "First-love Lemon-lime") / "Deep Mind" is the 13th single by the Japanese band Buono!, released in Japan on January 18, 2012.

== Composition ==
As the band members pointed out in their interviews to CDJournal, "Hatsukoi Cider" is a refreshing up-tempo track, while "Deep Mind", being a theme song for a horror movie, is a dark composition, which they performed in low, deep voices.

== Music video ==
The music video for "Hatsukoi Cider" features Hisako Tabuchi of the rock bands Bloodthirsty Butchers and Toddle on guitar. It features the members performing in a grey-lit room.

The music video for "Deep Mind" features Buono! singing in a dark area. A "MOVIE Ver." was released on the Event V of the single. A majority of it is the same as the music video but intercuts with scenes from the film Gomennasai, which Buono! themselves starred in.

== Tie-ups and theme songs ==
"Hatsukoi Cider / Deep Mind" is Buono!'s first double-A side single. The song "Hatsukoi Cider" was used as the closing theme for the television series Sūgaku Joshi Gakuen, in which Buono! members, as well as other members of Hello! Project, played (the opening song being "Pyoco Pyoco Ultra" by Morning Musume). "Hatsukoi Cider" was also chosen as the January 2012 closing theme for the Nippon Television musical variety show Happy Music, the successor of the musical program Ongaku Senshi Music Fighter.

The song "Deep Mind" was also used as a closing theme, for the horror film Gomennasai, which starred all three Buono! members. The song was unveiled at the movie's avant-premiere held in Tokyo on October 8, 2011.

== Release information ==
"Hatsukoi Cider / Deep Mind", released in Japan on January 18, 2012, is the band's 13th single and third single on the record label Zetima. There are 2 versions available: Regular Edition (CD only) and Limited Edition, the latter includes a DVD with a special version of the music video for "Hatsukoi Cider".

The music videos for both songs were released on the DVD single "Single V 'Hatsukoi Cider / Deep Mind'" a week after the CD single, on January 25.

As usual for Hello! Project singles, there also was another edition of the DVD single, a so-called Event V, made. It was sold at the Hatsukoi Cider / Deep Mind release event, held on February 26, and contained more versions of the music videos.

== Artwork ==
The Event V cover resembles the cover of Elvis Costello's debut album My Aim Is True. The Single V cover resembles the cover of The Beatles album Help!.

== Chart performance ==
The CD single ranked at number 7 in the Oricon Weekly Singles Chart in its debut week.

The DVD single "Single V 'Hatsukoi Cider / Deep Mind'" peaked at number 40 in the Oricon Weekly Combined DVD Chart.

== Track listing ==
=== CD single ===
CD
| No. | Title | Writer(s) | Length |
|---|---|---|---|
| 1. | "Hatsukoi Cider" (初恋サイダー) | Lyrics: NOBE, Music: Shihori, Arrangement: Miyanaga Jirō |
| 2. | "Deep Mind" (DEEP MIND) | Lyrics: Onoriku, Music and Arrangement: AKIRASTAR |
| 3. | "Hatsukoi Cider (Instrumental)" (初恋サイダー（Instrumental）) |
| 4. | "Deep Mind (Instrumental)" (DEEP MIND（Instrumental）) |

Limited Edition DVD
| No. | Title | Length |
|---|---|---|
| 1. | "Hatsukoi Cider (Close-up Buono! Ver.)" (初恋サイダー（Close-up BUONO! Ver.）) |

=== DVD singles ===
==== Single V ====
The corresponding DVD single is titled "Single V 'Hatsukoi Cider / Deep Mind'". It contains the music videos for both tracks and 3 special versions of the music video for "Hatsukoi Cider".

CD
| No. | Title | Length |
|---|---|---|
| 1. | "Hatsukoi Cider (Music Video)" (初恋サイダー（Music Video）) |
| 2. | "Deep Mind (Music Video)" (DEEP MIND（Music Video）) |
| 3. | "Hatsukoi Cider (Momoko Ver.)" (初恋サイダー（MOMOKO Ver.）) |
| 4. | "Hatsukoi Cider (Miyabi Ver.)" (初恋サイダー（MIYABI Ver.）) |
| 5. | "Hatsukoi Cider (Airi Ver.)" (初恋サイダー（AIRI Ver.）) |

==== Event V ====
The DVD single released for the Hatsukoi Cider / Deep Mind release event is titled "Event V 'Hatsukoi Cider / Deep Mind'".

CD
| No. | Title | Length |
|---|---|---|
| 1. | "Hatsukoi Cider (Band Shot Ver.)" (初恋サイダー（BAND Shot Ver.）) |
| 2. | "Deep Mind (Movie Ver.)" (DEEP MIND（MOVIE Ver.）) |
| 3. | "Deep Mind (Tsugunaga Momoko Ver.)" (DEEP MIND（嗣永桃子 Ver.）) |
| 4. | "Deep Mind (Natsuaki Miyabi Ver.)" (DEEP MIND（夏焼雅 Ver.）) |
| 5. | "Deep Mind (Suzuki Airi Ver.)" (DEEP MIND（鈴木愛理 Ver.）) |
| 6. | "Making-of" (メイキング映像) |

== Charts ==
| Chart (2012) | Peak position | | |
|---|---|---|---|
| Chart (2012) | Peak position | Oricon Daily Singles Chart | 4 |
| Oricon Weekly Singles Chart | 7 | | |
| Oricon Monthly Singles Chart | 43 | | |
| Billboard Japan Hot 100 | 54 | | |
| Billboard Japan Hot Singles Sales | 7 | | |
| Billboard Japan Adult Contemporary Airplay | 96 | | |
