= Zenkaren =

Zenkaren (the National Federation of Families of the Mentally Ill in Japan), established in 1965, was the oldest and largest stakeholder organization in Japan and the only organization officially designated for promoting vocational rehabilitation for people with mental illnesses. It had over 130,000 members and covered 1,600 associations nationwide. It operated 800 psychiatric sheltered workshops throughout Japan, where social stigma largely prevents employers from hiring a person who has been treated for mental illness (Johnson, 2001).

== Collapse ==
In 1996, Zenkaren constructed the 2 billion yen Heartpia Kitsuregawa in Sakura, Tochigi Prefecture, a hot spring (spa) hotel with a vocational rehabilitation facility. The cost was covered in part by grants, government subsidies and loans. After Zenkaren was found to have misused funds for personnel expenses and debt repayment it declared itself unable to meet its loan obligations, return the misused moneys to the government and the Nippon Foundation (a grantor) and pay penalties; therefore it declared bankruptcy and dissolved itself on April 17, 2007 (Zenkaren files for bankruptcy, 2007).
