= Mao Miyaji =

Japanese actress (born 1984)

Mao Miyaji (宮地真緒, Miyaji Mao; born February 2, 1984 in Sumoto, Hyōgo Prefecture, Japan) is a Japanese actress.

== Filmography ==
=== Films ===
Year	Film	Role	Notes
2004	Pika**nchi Life Is Hard Dakara Happy		
2004	Mura no shashinshuu		
2006	Waiting in the Dark	Kazue Futaba	
2006	Red Whale, White Snake	Akemi Tanaka	
2007	Ningen-isu		
2008	Chiisana koi no monogatari		
2008	Kamigakari		
2010	Shitsuren satsujin		
2010	Amazing Grace		
2014	The Snow White Murder Case	Mayama	
2018	Koi no Shizuku		
2022	School Lunch of Ashiya City		
2025	Ice on the Moon		
2025	S-Friends 4		
2026	Captured!	Mieko Hashimoto	

=== Television ===
Year	Title	Role	Notes
2003	Waterboys	Asako Ohnishi	
2004	Sore wa, totsuzen, arashi no you ni...	Kaori Hayakawa	
2004	Minami-kun no Koibito		mini-series
2005	Atakku no. 1	Kaori Yagisawa	
2008	Yonaoshi baraetî: Kangorongo		
