= Sāya Yamabuki =

Sāya Yamabuki may refer to:

- Sāya Yamabuki (山吹 沙綾), a minor character in the Japanese TV series Shugo Chara!
- Sāya Yamabuki (山吹 沙綾), a character in the series BanG Dream!
