= Tsukuyomi (disambiguation) =

Tsukuyomi may refer to:

- Tsukuyomi-no-Mikoto (月読), a moon god in Shinto and Japanese mythology
- 10412 Tsukuyomi, an asteroid from the asteroid belt
- Tsukuyomi: Moon Phase, a manga and anime series
- Tsukuyomi (Negima! Magister Negi Magi), a character in the manga series Negima!
- Ikuto Tsukiyomi, a fictional character from the manga series Shugo Chara! by Peach-Pit
- Utau Tsukiyomi, a fictional character from the manga series Shugo Chara! by Peach-Pit
