= List of Shugo Chara! episodes =

- The collectible artbox of the first DVD release in Japan by Pony Canyon.
- No. of episodes: 51

Release
- Original network: TV Tokyo, TV Aichi, TV Hokkaido, TV Osaka, TV Setouchi, TVQ Kyushu Broadcasting
- Original release: October 6, 2007 – September 27, 2008

Series chronology
- Next → Shugo Chara!! Doki—

Shugo Chara! is a 2007 Japanese anime television series based on Peach-Pit's award-winning manga series of the same name. The animated series was produced by Satelight under the direction of Kenji Yasuda and consists of fifty-one episodes. The story follows Amu Hinamori, whose "cool and spicy" exterior belies her introverted personality. When Amu wishes for the courage to be reborn as her "would-be self", she is surprised to find three colorful eggs the next morning, which give birth to three Guardian Characters: Ran, Miki and Su.

The series was first broadcast on TV Tokyo in Japan between October 6, 2007, and September 27, 2008. The episodes were rebroadcast by TV Aichi, TV Hokkaido, TV Osaka, TV Setouchi, and TVQ Kyushu Broadcasting within a few days of the initial broadcast on TV Tokyo. During the week of April 7 to April 13, 2008, "The Fourth Guardian Egg!" (四つ目のしゅごたま!, Yottsume no Shugo Tama!) became one of the 10 most watched anime episodes when it received an average household viewership rating of 4.2%. It later returned to the top 10 during the week of July 21–27, 2008, when its July 26 broadcast received an average rating of 4.1%. A second series, Shugo Chara!! Doki—, immediately followed the first series.

Six pieces of theme music by the J-pop group Buono! are used for the first season—two opening themes and four closing themes. The opening theme for the first twenty-six episodes is "Egg of the Heart" (こころのたまご, Kokoro no Tamago); and the last twenty-five episodes, "I Love Everyone" (みんなだいすき, Minna Daisuki). The closing theme for the first twelve episodes is "True Self" (ホントのじぶん, Honto no Jibun); episodes thirteen to twenty-six, "Love Rider" (恋愛ライダー, Ren'ai Raidā); episodes twenty-seven to thirty-nine, "Kiss! Kiss! Kiss!"; and the last twelve episodes, "Do Your Best and Go!" (ガチンコでいこう!, Gachinko de Ikō!).

Sixteen DVD compilations of three to four episodes each are scheduled for release by Pony Canyon. The first compilation was released on February 20, 2008, with the sixteenth compilation released on May 20, 2009. In addition, four DVD artbox compilations were released. The first three compilations are composed of thirteen episodes, while the fourth compilation is composed of the last twelve. The first artbox compilation was released on March 19, 2008, with the final artbox compilation released on February 18, 2009.

== Episode list ==
| No. | Title | Directed by | Written by | Original release date |
|---|---|---|---|---|
| 1 | "A Guardian Character is Born!"; Transliteration: "Shugo Kyara Tanjō!" (Japanese: しゅごキャラ誕生!) | Kenji Yasuda | Michiru Shimada | October 6, 2007 |
People view Amu Hinamori as a "cool and spicy" 10-year old girl; Amu is actually timid and easily scared. The next morning, after wishing for the courage to be her "would-be" self, she discovers three colorful eggs—red, blue, and green—in her bed. At school, the eggs draw the attention of Tadase Hotori, whom Amu develops a crush on and confesses to in front of the entire school after a Character Change. However, Tadase rejects her. Others are also interested in the eggs as Ikuto Tsukiyomi and his Guardian Character, Yoru, attempts to steal them. One of the eggs hatch and Ran, Amu's Guardian Character, emerges to help Amu out and along with the Humpty Lock, stolen by Ikuto earlier, Character Transforms into Amulet Heart.
| 2 | "The Heart's Egg!"; Transliteration: "Kokoro no Tamago!" (Japanese: こころのたまご!) | Hiromitsu Kanazawa | Michiru Shimada | October 13, 2007 |
Nadeshiko Fujisaki invites Amu to tea at the Royal Garden with the Student Council Guardians, along with a message from Tadase that he will tell her about the Heart's Egg. During P.E. class, the blue egg begins to hatch, unbeknownst to Amu and Ran, and Miki, Amu's second Guardian Character, peers out. However, after seeing Amu and Ran in an argument over a Character Change, Miki runs off. The two soon discover Miki and give chase. Miki warns Amu that if she does not believe in her Guardian Characters, they will disappear. When Amu meets with the Guardians, Tadase, Nadeshiko, Kukai Soma, and Yaya Yuiki, she discovers that they also have Guardian Characters and they invite Amu to join. However, Amu refuses and runs away. After Amu encounters a third-grade admirer, Suzuki, and an X Egg forms from his heart's egg, Amu transforms into Amulet Heart and purifies the X Egg.
| 3 | "Flaky and Fluffy, Leave it to Su!"; Transliteration: "Saku to Fuwa to Sū ni Omakase!" (Japanese: サクッとふわっとスゥにおまかせ!) | Hiromitsu Kanazawa | Kazuhiko Inukai | October 20, 2007 |
Nadeshiko tells Amu that the two should become friends. However, Amu (who is also going) sees it as a trick to get her to join the Guardians. Nadeshiko convinces Amu to go together with Amu to Tadase's house. The two (Amu and Nadeshiko) meet in the school's kitchen to make some snacks. Nadeshiko warns Amu who happened to be with them about using the word "Prince" around Tadase. Ikuto interrupts the two and attempts to steal the last egg. However, the egg hatches and Su, Amu's third Guardian Character, emerges. While Amu waits for Nadeshiko at a park, she is surprise when Tadase arrives instead. Panicking, she inadvertently gives him the snacks containing a love note inside. Amu tries to sneak into Tadase's house to retrieve the note, but discovers that Tadase Character Changes into someone set on world domination whenever he hears the word "Prince". The next day, the Guardians announce Amu as their new member, the Joker.
| 4 | "I'm The Trump Card!?"; Transliteration: "Atashi ga Kirifuda!?" (Japanese: あたしが切り札!?) | Miho Hirao | Ryunosuke Kingetsu | October 27, 2007 |
Amu protests to the Guardians about making her a member. However, the Guardians explain that while they have to do boring work, the Joker's responsibility is dealing with her own affairs and handling the X Eggs. Amu receives the Humpty Lock and a pouch to carry her Guardian Characters. Nevertheless, Amu refuses wearing the cape that the Guardians wear. At home, Ikuto drops by and gives Amu a bag of cookies and candies as a way to make up, but warns Amu to not search for the Embryo or they will be enemies. The next day, Amu chases after an X Egg, but bumps into the new teacher, Yuu Nikaidou, and loses track of it. The egg hatches into an X Character and finds Amu at the school's planetarium where Amu Character Transforms into Amulet Heart and purifies the X Character.
| 5 | "Shoot! Get that X-Character!"; Transliteration: "Shūto! Batsu Kyara o Yattsukero!" (Japanese: シュート! ×キャラをやっつけろ!) | Susumu Kudo; Yukie Suzuki | Makoto Nakamura | November 3, 2007 |
Nadeshiko and Amu watch Kukai's soccer team practice where Amu encounters Yamada, one of Kukai's teammates. However, when the coach announces the starters for the next match against a top ranked team, Yamada does not make the list. At the match, Yamada sneaks away while feeling that he cannot match Kukai's abilities. Nikaidou takes advantage of Yamada's feelings and extracts Yamada's Heart's Egg, which turns into an X Egg and hatches into an X Character. Amu transforms and is able to purify the X Character just in time for the coach to declare Yamada as a substitute one of the starters. With Yamada's efforts, the team is able to tie the game.
| 6 | "Character Transformation! Amulet Spade!"; Transliteration: "Kyara Nari! Amyuretto Supēdo!" (Japanese: キャラなり! アミュレットスペード!) | Kiyoshi Matsuda | Tomoko Koyama | November 10, 2007 |
Amu accompanies Yaya to the guardian's ballet class. While there, Amu meets with the class's prima, Maika Himekawa. During practice, Maika sprains her ankle and Yaya is chosen to be Maika's stand-in for the upcoming performance. While thinking about Maika, Amu goes to the planetarium she discovered in episode four and meets with the planetarium's caretaker. Meanwhile, Nikaidou meets with Ikuto on the street and informs him that Maika's egg may be the Embryo, but if it is not, Ikuto will need to clean up. During dress rehearsals, Nikaidou extracts Maika's egg, but it turns into an X Egg and hatches an X Character. Yaya Character Changes to combat the X Character but her attack is reflected back to her. Amu does her first Character Transformation with Miki and the two become Amulet Spade. As Amulet Spade, Amu is able to purify the X Character.
| 7 | "The Small Egg!"; Transliteration: "Chiisana Tamago!" (Japanese: ちいさなたまご!) | Masayuki Iimura | Michiru Shimada | November 17, 2007 |
Amu takes her little sister, Ami, with her to a guardian meeting. Amu learns that Ami is also able to see the Guardian Characters. While the Guardians hold their meeting, the Guardian Characters play with Ami and find a treasure map to a magical egg protected by a dragon. Ami and the Guardian Characters sneak out of the Royal Garden in search for the magic egg and, along with Yoru who left Ikuto to search for the Embryo by himself, get into much trouble at the school. When the Guardians discovered that Ami and the Guardian Characters are missing, they run off to look for them. Amu and the Guardian Characters uncover a time capsule under a dragon-shape tree when the Guardians finally find them. Inside, the capsule contained essays that each class member wrote about what they dreamed of becoming, including Tadase's dream of dominating the world.
| 8 | "I've Fallen in Love with Your Eyes!"; Transliteration: "Kimi no Hitomi ni Koishiteru!" (Japanese: 君の瞳に恋してるっ!) | Kazunobu Shimizu | Kazuhiko Inukai | November 24, 2007 |
Amu encounters Misaki Watarai, an energetic girl who is also in love with Tadase. Misaki suggests that the two should team up to have a better chance for Tadase, but also reminds Amu that she was "safe" since Tadase has already rejected her. The two scope out the competition, including Saaya Yamabuki, head of Tadase's fan club, and Nadeshiko. But when Misaki meets with Tadase, she runs away. The next day, Misaki recruits Amu again and the two frantically search for Tadase until they find him. However, Misaki accidentally calls Tadase "Prince" and Tadase Character Changes into his egotistical king personality. After Saaya chides Misaki for Misaki's energetic personality and misunderstanding Tadase's conversation with Nadeshiko, Misaki becomes heartbroken and Nikaidou extracts Misaki's egg, but it hatches into an X Character. While Tadase provides cover, Amu Character Transforms into Amulet Heart and purifies the X Character.
| 9 | "The Seven Mysteries of the Fujisaki Family!?"; Transliteration: "Fujisaki-ke no Nana Fushigi!?" (Japanese: 藤咲家の七不思議!?) | Hiromitsu Kanazawa | Ryunosuke Kingetsu | December 1, 2007 |
Nadeshiko invites Amu to a sleep over so that the two can get to know each other better. But in order to keep Ami home, Amu makes up a story about the Seven Mysteries of the Fujisaki house. As Amu arrives at Nadeshiko's home, she begins to believe her own story. Amu and Nadeshiko enjoy their time together, but after Amu takes her bath, she gets lost inside the house. Meanwhile, the Guardian Characters chase a mouse and the ruckus they make terrifies Amu. At night, Amu attempts to sneak out, but she gets lost again. Amu comes across the dance hall where Nadeshiko is practicing for an upcoming performance and Amu thinks that she has failed as a friend for being selfish. However, the housekeeper informs Amu that this was not true. The next morning, Amu is happy that her first sleepover was with Nadeshiko.
| 10 | "Character Transformation! Amulet Clover!"; Transliteration: "Kyara Nari! Amyuretto Kurōbā!" (Japanese: キャラなり! アミュレットクローバー!) | Shin Tosaka | Kenji Yasuda; Makoto Nakamura | December 8, 2007 |
Ami wants to decorate a Christmas tree with Amu, so after school, Amu and the Guardians shop for decorations. As the group leaves the store, Yoru steals Su's decoration and Su is separated from the rest of the group. Amu, Ran, and Miki search for Su, but eventually call it a night. Meanwhile, Su befriends a white shaggy puppy who is also lost. The next day, Amu and the Guardians search for Su. Su and the puppy come across an X Egg and the two chase after it. However, Ikuto catches the egg and is about to break before Su prevents him by taking the egg. Utau Hoshina interrupts the confrontation and uses a Character Change to take the egg back from Su. But before Utau can break it, Amu arrives. Amu does a Character Transformation with Su, becoming Amulet Clover and purifies the egg.
| 11 | "The Snow Mountain Holiday!"; Transliteration: "Yukiyama no Kyūjitsu!" (Japanese: 雪山の休日!) | Susumu Kudo | Tomoko Koyama | December 15, 2007 |
The Guardians go to a winter training camp and stay with Kukai's grandfather, who is the priest at a temple near a ski resort. The Guardians enter a snow-sculpting contest, each building a part of a castle. However, Amu becomes discouraged with her gate. When Amu asks Miki to do a Character Change, Miki refuses. On the way back to the temple, Amu asks Tadase about the person he said he already liked when he rejected her. Tadase explains that he was referring to his family's dog. Nevertheless, Tadase confesses that he has come to like Amu's alter ego, Amulet Heart. That night, Amu becomes depressed that Tadase likes Amulet Heart, but that Amulet Heart is not her. Ran reminds Amu that Amulet Heart is Amu's would-be self and that Amulet Heart exists within Amu. Amu then becomes determined to work towards becoming her would-be selves.
| 12 | "A Sad Christmas Eve!"; Transliteration: "Kanashimi no Kurisumasu Ibu!" (Japanese: 悲しみのクリスマス·イブ!) | Keisuke Onishi | Kazuhiko Inukai | December 22, 2007 |
Amu goes shopping with Nadeshiko and Yaya for a Christmas party. When Amu sees a music video by Utau, Yaya informs Amu that Utau is a new idol singer. Elsewhere, Utau is practicing her performance, but when she becomes disheartened, her manager, Yukari Sanjo, brings up Ikuto. Utau is then determined to work harder. As Amu hurriedly runs home, she comes to a park where different groups are performing music. Amu hears a sorrowful melody and when she follows it, she discovers that it is Ikuto playing his violin. After the Guardian's Christmas party the next day, Amu returns home. However, the Guardian Characters feel the presence of X Eggs. They return to the park and find that everyone's eggs have been extracted en masse and have turned into X Eggs. In the middle of them stands Ikuto, who disappears in a burst of wind, along with the eggs.
| 13 | "Big Disturbance! New Year Live!"; Transliteration: "Daiharan! Nyū Iyā Raibu!" (Japanese: 大波乱! ニューイヤーライブ!) | Mamoru Enomoto | Michiru Shimada | January 5, 2008 |
Amu and the Guardians go to a live New Year's concert where Utau will be performing. While waiting, the Guardians realize that the Easter Company is the sponsor of the concert. Amu also sees Ikuto and follows him into a back area where she inadvertently overhears a conversation between Nikaidou, Yukari, and another person discussing the events that took place on Christmas Eve. As the concert begins, everything is going well until Utau sprouts tiny batwings and four X Eggs appear. The concert ends when part of the scaffolding above the stage falls due to the shenanigans of the Guardian Characters. Amu transforms into Amulet Heart and purifies the X Eggs, but not before Ikuto Character Transforms into Black Lynx and shatters one of the eggs. Amu learns what happens when someone's Heart's Egg is destroyed.
| 14 | "A Guardian Character at the Ski Slope!? Snoppe's Appearance!"; Transliteration: "Gerende ni Shugo Kyara!? Sunoppe Tōjō!" (Japanese: ゲレンデにしゅごキャラ!? スノッペ登場!) | Kazunobu Shimizu | Makoto Nakamura | January 12, 2008 |
The fifth and sixth graders are being taught how to snowboard by a top snowboarder in Japan, 11-year-old Mifuyu Torii. Amu's Guardian Characters detect that Mifuyu is about to create a powerful Heart's Egg, which also doesn't go unnoticed by Nikaidou. That evening, Mifuyu is about to compete in the preliminaries for a snowboarding competition. However, she becomes scared. When Mifuyu wishes to become brave and break her habit of becoming frightened before competing, her Guardian Egg appears and Snoppe hatches from it. With Snoppe's help, Mifuyu is able to compete calmly in the preliminaries. Nikaidou sees Snoppe and realizes that Guardian Characters are born from powerful Heart's Eggs. Attempting to harness that power, he confronts Mifuyu and causes her to begin to doubt herself. These negative emotions cause Snoppe to turn into an X Egg and Nikaidou quietly makes off with it.
| 15 | "The Battle at the Snowfield! Save Snoppe!"; Transliteration: "Setsugen no Daikōbō! Sunoppe o Sukue!" (Japanese: 雪原の大攻防! スノッペを救え!) | Hiromitsu Kanazawa | Makoto Nakamura | January 19, 2008 |
The Guardians learn that Snoppe is missing and set out in search for her. However, there is not much time left before Mifuyu competes. Meanwhile, Nikaidou analyzes Mifuyu's X Egg in a remote cabin, but is interrupted by Suzuki, Amu's admirer. Later, Amu nearly runs into Suzuki and brings him back to the resort where he tells the Guardians about the egg he saw. The Guardians find the cabin, but Nikaidou is alerted to their presence. However, as he slips off, Amu catches a glimpse of him. When the guardians enter the cabin, Snoppe hatches from the egg as an X Character. Amu and Ran transform into Amulet Heart and purify Snoppe. Snoppe returns to Mifuyu and the two are finally able to compete and win the competition. As the group returns home, Amu begins to suspect that Nikaidou is the one creating the X Eggs.
| 16 | "One Two Three☆Heart's Magic!"; Transliteration: "Wan Tsū Surī☆Hāto no Majikku!" (Japanese: ワン·ツー·スリー☆ハートのマジック!) | Miho Hirao | Ryunosuke Kingetsu | January 26, 2008 |
The Guardians meet with child magician Zero, who is also fourth-grade student at the school named Takuya Nakagura. Takuya tells the Guardians about how he loves performing magic. However, as he became more popular, his manager did not want Takuya to perform real magic on stage, instead relying on CG effects. To help, the Guardians organize a magic show where Takuya performs under an alias. After the performance, Takuya talks about an imaginary friend named Zero, who turns out to be his Guardian Character. Amu also confides her suspicions about Nikaidou with the other Guardians. At the studio, Takuya learns that he has been fired, and Nikaidou attempts to turn Zero into an X Egg. The guardians arrive at the studio just in time to see Nikaidou leave, but Zero has already become an X Character. Amu does a Character Transformation with Miki, becoming Amulet Spade and purifies Zero.
| 17 | "The Breathtaking Speech Contest!"; Transliteration: "Supīchi Kontesuto Kiki Ippatsu!" (Japanese: スピーチコンテスト危機一髪!) | Hiromitsu Kanazawa | Michiru Shimada | February 2, 2008 |
Nikaidou plans to use the next X Egg to create the Embryo and selects Kukai as his next target. Meanwhile, Amu is selected as the speech contest representative. The other Guardians lend their aid, but Saaya grows jealous when she sees Kukai and Tadase help Amu. Nikaidou takes advantage of Saaya's jealously and manipulates Saaya into giving Kukai false information about how Tadase was gossiping about Kukai. Soon after, the two guardians are in an argument and Daichi returns to his egg. However, the arguing is a ruse by Kukai and Tadase to bring Nikaidou out into the open. Amu transforms into Amulet Heart and uses the Heart Rod for the first time to stop Nikaidou, but is unsuccessful. Nikaidou escapes, but he tears up Amu's speech manuscript in the process. However, Amu is able to give an extremely short improv speech on friendship and wins the contest.
| 18 | "Happy, Embarrassing First Date!"; Transliteration: "Ureshi Hazukashi Hatsu Dēto!" (Japanese: うれしはずかし初デート!) | Hiromitsu Kanazawa | Kazuhiko Inukai | February 9, 2008 |
Tadase invites the other Guardians to an aquarium, however, only Amu is able to go. Amu begins to panic as the trip turns into a date with Tadase but she eventually calms down. As Tadase is about to tell Amu something important, they are interrupted by a little girl who quickly become attached to Tadase. As Amu and Tadase wonder what to do with the little girl, they spot an X Egg floating above the crowd. The egg takes off and Amu chases after it, but the little girl keeps Tadase from following. As Amu is about to catch the egg, she runs into Yoru who is carrying the Dumpty Key. Yoru tells Amu about the Dumpty Key, but the X Egg swoops in and steals the key. Ikuto arrives and chases after the egg with Amu, as Amulet Heart, following. Working together, they finally purify the egg.
| 19 | "Papa and Mama's Memories!"; Transliteration: "Papa to Mama no Omoide!" (Japanese: パパとママの思い出!) | Group Tac Co., Ltd. | Tomoko Koyama | February 16, 2008 |
On the way home from a park, Amu's parents get into an argument about when they first went on a date. Eventually, they make up, but when they search for the photo Amu's father took when he first met with Amu's mother, they discover that it was missing. Amu's parents get into another argument because Amu's father placed the photo in a bird magazine and Amu's mother donated the magazine to a bazaar. With the help of Nadeshiko and Yaya, Amu searches the bazaar for the magazine and eventually finds it. However, Yoru steals the magazine thinking it contains a clue about the Embryo. Amu chases after Yoru in order to get the picture back, but the picture is torn in the process. Amu and Su transforms into Amulet Clover and use Remake Honey to repair the picture and a broken clock.
| 20 | "A Present for You!"; Transliteration: "Kimi e no Okurimono!" (Japanese: 君への贈り物!) | Miho Hirao | Kazuhiko Inukai | February 23, 2008 |
Kukai introduces Amu, Nadeshiko, and Yaya to his childhood friend, Sion. Sion is an aspiring pianist and will be leaving town soon to challenge her skills. On the way home from school, Kukai runs into Sion as she searches for a four-leaf clover. The next day, Amu encounters Kukai at a mall as he looks for a farewell gift for Sion. While they look for a gift, the two Guardians run into Sion. Meanwhile, Utau puts on a concert at the mall, and several X Eggs are extracted from the crowd, including Sion's. Amu runs into Utau and meets with Utau's Guardian Character, Il, while Kukai is busy rounding up the eggs. Amu finds Kukai and Character Transforms into Amulet Spade to cleanse the eggs. Just before Sion leaves for her studies, Kukai arrives and gives Sion her farewell gift, a four-leaf clover.
| 21 | "Kidnapping of Guardian Characters!"; Transliteration: "Shugo Kyara Yūkai Sareru!" (Japanese: しゅごキャラ誘拐される!) | Mamoru Enomoto | Ryunosuke Kingetsu | March 1, 2008 |
Amu is home alone while her parents go to Ami's school play. Her parents ask her to sign for a crab, that was sent by her grandmother. After a bad encounter with the crab where Miki is caught, Amu goes to meet her parents at a French restaurant. Because Miki is pouting, Amu decides to leave the three at the front of the restaurant. However, Nikaidou steals them. Thinking that they ran away, Amu searches for the Guardian Characters. While searching, she encounters Yoru, who tells Amu that he and Ikuto saw Nikaidou steal Amu's Guardian Characters. Yoru takes Amu to Nikaidou's place, but he leads her through all of the weird cat trails. Amu almost falls off a tall wall, but Ikuto saves her and takes her to confront Nikaidou. Nikaidou is too powerful, and gets away while Ikuto protects her from Nikaidou's powerful X Egg magic.
| 22 | "Guardian Characters Rescue Mission!"; Transliteration: "Shugo Kyara Kyūshutsu Daisakusen!" (Japanese: しゅごキャラ救出大作戦!) | Hiromitsu Kanazawa | Makoto Nakamura | March 8, 2008 |
The Guardians offer to help Amu find her eggs. They run into Utau and Saeki Nobuko, the spiritualist, along the way. Saeki can see the Guardian Characters and is at first frightened by them. However, she agrees to help the Guardians in their search. Utau also comes along because she does not like Nikaidou's methods. Saeki drives like a maniac and eventually finds Nikaidou. As the Guardians confront Nikaidou, Utau's manager, Yukari Sanjo, appears and scolds her, asking if Utau is fine with whatever happens to Ikuto. Utau Character Transforms with Il, becoming Lunatic Charm, and attacks the Guardians. Ikuto comes to help and Utau de-transforms upon seeing him. After a struggle, Ran and Miki are freed, but Su is still with Nikaidou. Nikaidou makes a deal with Amu: he will give her a chance to get Su back, but she has to come get Su from his laboratory.
| 23 | "Remake Honey! My Would Be Self!"; Transliteration: "Rimeiku Hanī! Naritai Jibun!" (Japanese: リメイクハニー! なりたい自分!) | Kazunobu Shimizu | Michiru Shimada | March 15, 2008 |
While awaiting Amu to arrive, Su convinces Nikaidou to let her clean up the messy laboratory and make a fresh cup of coffee. While cleaning, Su discovers an old photo of Nikaidou when he was a boy and his mentor. Nikaidou recalls his dream of being a robotics professor and when his own Guardian Egg appeared. However, Nikaidou gave up his dream when his mentor retired due to his wife's illness and Nikaidou's Guardian Egg was broken. Amu arrives at the laboratory, fights a bunch of robots, rescues Su, and purifies all of the X Eggs that Nikaidou had collected. Nikaidou's Guardian Egg reappears and his Guardian Character hatches. The Guardian Character greets Nikaidou, then disappears. Su tells Nikaidou that his "would-be self" can be renewed as many times as needed. Nikaidou stops working for Easter and discovers his mentor did not give up on his dream either.
| 24 | "Sketch of Heart!"; Transliteration: "Kokoro no Suketchi!" (Japanese: 心のスケッチ!) | Kenji Yasuda | Tomoko Koyama | March 22, 2008 |
Amu's class is assigned to draw a composition about their favorite place at school. Amu also learns that Nikaidou has returned to the school as an actual teacher. As she visits various locations around the school, Amu reflects back to the events since her Guardian Characters appeared. When Amu turns in her composition, it is of the other Guardians sitting around the table at the Royal Garden.
| 25 | "Nadeshiko! Goodbye Despite Spring!?"; Transliteration: "Nadeshiko! Haru Nanoni Sayonara!?" (Japanese: なでしこ! 春なのにさよなら!?) | Shin Tosaka | Michiru Shimada | March 29, 2008 |
Nadeshiko tells the Guardians that she will be leaving for England soon. Meanwhile, Amu is having trouble deciding whether she is in love with Kukai, Tadase, or Ikuto. Amu goes to the Royal Garden to ask Nadeshiko for advice, but finds Nadeshiko is not there. Amu then goes to Nadeshiko's home where she encounters a boy named Nagihiko, who claims he is Nadeshiko's older twin brother. Nagihiko runs off with Amu and takes her for a walk in a park. The two eventually visit a shrine where one can pray to have true love with their loved ones and get matching charms, after which the two eventually part company. When Nagihiko arrives home, he dresses up as a female and is revealed to be Nadeshiko. It is the Fujisaki family's tradition for the males to be raised as females as part of their dance training. Amu later learns that Nadeshiko is leaving.
| 26 | "The New Beginning!"; Transliteration: "Atarashii Hajimari!" (Japanese: 新しいはじまり!) | Susumu Kudo | Ryunosuke Kingetsu | April 5, 2008 |
The school year ends, but Amu is depressed because Nadeshiko has left and Kukai will be graduating. To help cheer her up, Kukai teaches Amu a new move for Amulet Heart. Later that night, Ikuto wanders the streets and gets into a fight with two guys who were harassing two girls. Amu is also out shopping to cheer herself up, but she overhears the two girls as they escaped, talking about a guy with cat-like reflexes. Worrying if it was Ikuto, Amu searches and finds him in an alleyway. After Amu tries to treat his wounds and gets teased in return, Ikuto leads Amu home. Along the way, they stop at an amusement park that will be torn down soon. After riding several of the rides by herself and with the Guardian Characters, Amu finally gets Ikuto on a tea-cup ride where the two share a heart to heart moment.
| 27 | "The Fourth Guardian Egg!"; Transliteration: "Yottsume no Shugo Tama!" (Japanese: 四つ目のしゅごたま!) | Kazunobu Shimizu | Kazuhiko Inukai | April 12, 2008 |
A new school year begins and Amu wakes up to find a yellow Guardian Egg with a diamond pattern in her bed. Meanwhile, Utau steals more Heart's Eggs during a concert. This results in an argument between Il and Utau's second Guardian Character, El, causing El to fly away. Amu is excited that she and Tadase will be in the same class, but being in a new class makes her nervous. The class gets excited over a transfer student, Rima Mashiro. Ran, Miki, and Su sense another Guardian Character coming from Rima. However, when Amu's unsuccessfully attempts to become friends with Rima, a rivalry between the boys, who support Rima, and the girls, who support Amu, breaks out. The rest of the day fares no better as Amu has trouble capturing an X Egg, nearly hitting Yaya in the process. Amu becomes depressed, and her fourth Guardian Egg turns into an X Egg.
| 28 | "Joker Disqualification? New Guardians Appear!"; Transliteration: "Jōkā Shikkaku? Shin Gādian Tōjō!" (Japanese: ジョーカー失格? 新ガーディアン登場!) | Takashi Yoshimoto | Makoto Nakamura | April 19, 2008 |
Amu tries to catch her X Egg, however she literally bumps into El and takes El home. The next day, the new Guardians are announced. Rima is the new Queen's Chair and Kairi Sanjo is the new Jack's Chair. The new Guardians introduce themselves, but things starts off roughly and Amu is unable to tell anyone about the diamond egg. To deal with the rise in X Eggs, Tadase decides that the other guardians will help Amu by splitting up into teams and search for them. Amu is first paired with Rima and the two eventually find an X Egg. However, Amu is unable to capture it. Rima and her Guardian Character, Kusukusu, Character Transforms and become Clown Drop. Instead of purifying the egg, they destroy it. Amu becomes upset with Rima even though Rima does not understand why. Meanwhile, Ran and El talk about what happened between El and Utau.
| 29 | "Character Transformation!? Amulet Angel!"; Transliteration: "Kyara Nari!? Amyuretto Enjeru!" (Japanese: キャラなり!? アミュレットエンジェル!) | Miho Hirao | Tomoko Koyama | April 26, 2008 |
Kukai comes back to visit the Guardians. He notices that Amu is feeling down, so he decides to ask her what is wrong. As they talk, they encounter Utau. Utau shows Amu that she has Amu's diamond egg. Utau tries to goad Amu into a fight, but Amu refuses. With the power of the Humpty Lock, El does a Character Transformation with Amu, becoming Amulet Angel, and Kukai does a Character Transformation with Daichi, becoming Sky Jack. Diamond hatches from her X-egg and does a Character Transformation with Utau, becoming Dark Jewel. Nevertheless, Amu's and Utau's Character Transformations do not last long and they are both exhausted. Ikuto appears and apologizes to Amu for Utau's actions. Utau becomes furious that Ikuto is taking Amu's side and forcefully kisses him twice. Ikuto gets angry, and tells Utau to stop because they are siblings, to the surprise of Amu and Kukai.
| 30 | "Star Class vs. Moon Class! Great Cheerleader Activity!"; Transliteration: "Hoshi-gumi VS Tsuki-gumi! Chia Gāru Daikatsuyaku!" (Japanese: 星組VS月組! チアガール大活躍!) | Shin Tosaka | Ryunosuke Kingetsu | May 3, 2008 |
The Guardians attempt to capture an X Egg, but Rima destroys it instead. Amu scolds Rima for not following the plan, but Rima thinks that Amu's methods are foolish. The next day, the Star and Moon classes are competing against each other in an athletic festival. Rima sits out since she does not see the point in getting all sweaty. When a girl in the Star Class is injured, Amu convinces Rima to take her place. However, Rima still does not want to participate. Another X Egg appears and Amu transforms into Amulet Heart and chases after it. Amu chases the X Egg out onto the athletic field in front of the entire school. Fortunately, everyone mistakes it for a cheerleading routine, and Amu purifies the egg, to the amazement of Rima. After the festival, Kairi informs his sister, Yukari Sanjo, about the events.
| 31 | "Pretty Baby☆Great Tumult!"; Transliteration: "Puritī Beibī☆Daisōdō!" (Japanese: プリティベイビィ☆大騒動!) | Takenori Mihara | Tomoko Koyama | May 10, 2008 |
Yaya convinces the Guardians to hold a special meeting at her house. It turns out that Yaya just wanted the Guardians to help babysit her baby brother, Tsubasa, because she does not want to. Yaya is jealous of her brother because he is always the center of attention instead of her. When Utau becomes the suspect in the rise of X Eggs, El interrupts the meeting. Amu tries to explain about El and her fourth egg, but Tsubasa begins to cry. Amu is the only one who knows how to take care of a baby. As the group is about to leave, Yaya discovers that Tsubasa is running a fever and becomes frantic. She rushes him to a doctor who gives Tsubasa some medicine to bring down the fever. Afterwards, the doctor compliments Yaya for being a big sister. Later, Amu finally tells the Guardians about her egg.
| 32 | "The Lonely Queen!"; Transliteration: "Hitoribotchi no Kuīn!" (Japanese: ひとりぼっちのクイーン!) | Mamoru Enomoto | Michiru Shimada | May 17, 2008 |
When Rima gets stuck with organizing the class's book collection, Amu stays behind to help out. Rima asks Amu to call her by her first name, and vice versa. While cleaning, Amu finds a popular gag comic, which Rima grabs and speedily reads. As she reads, Rima does a Character Change and cracks a joke in front of Amu. Embarrassed, Rima tells Amu not to tell anyone that she loves gag comics. Amu runs into Kairi and learns that Rima was nearly kidnapped before and there was a dispute between her parents. The next day, Rima accidentally Character Changes and cracks a joke in front of the entire class. Afterwards, Rima runs out of classroom and Amu chases after her. Amu tells Rima that a similar incident happened to her, referring to Amu's first Character Change. The two girls have a heart to heart and become best friends.
| 33 | "I Can't Help But Fall in Love!"; Transliteration: "Suki ni Narazu ni Irarenai!" (Japanese: 好きにならずにいられない!) | Kazunobu Shimizu | Kazuhiko Inukai | May 24, 2008 |
Tadase and Amu go shopping together as Kairi follows them in order to spy on Amu. Amu sees a bracelet that she likes, but Tadase buys Amu a black heart-shaped barrette. Tadase buys himself and Amu ice cream, but Amu's ice cream drips onto her skirt and he runs off to go find a fountain to wet his handkerchief. Ikuto drops by and teases Amu. Amu becomes angry and ends up tripping on one of the shopping bags, falling onto Ikuto. When Tadase returns, a fight breaks out between him and Ikuto. Kairi and El arrive and El forces Amu into a Character Transformation, much to everyone's surprise. However, Amu's effort to stop the fight is ineffective. Tadase and Ikuto continue their fight and eventually Ikuto runs off with Tadase chasing after him. Kairi, who had been watching the whole thing, gives Amu the bracelet she had wanted and then runs off.
| 34 | "Really!? Big Adventure to the Haunted Mansion!"; Transliteration: "Maji!? Yūrei Yashiki Daibōken!" (Japanese: マジ!? 幽霊屋敷大冒険!) | Hiromitsu Kanazawa | Makoto Nakamura | May 31, 2008 |
The Guardians decide to investigate a house that is alleged to be haunted. However, Amu is scared of ghosts and does not want to go. Rima bumps into a boy at school who drops a small photograph of his family. The next day, the Guardians arrive at the house and begin their investigation, but Amu is frightened out of her wits. Ran, Miki, and Su chase after what they think is a ghost, but turns out to be a Guardian Character, Kuuta, who is fading away. Meanwhile, Rima sees the boy she bumped into the day before, Shouta, enter the house and she returns the photo to him. Shouta's dream was to be a painter. However, his parents argued over it and his grandfather, who supported Shouta's dream, died. Shouta's depression causes Kuuta to turn into an X Character. Working together, Rima and Amu Character Transform and purify Kuuta.
| 35 | "Wedding Cake of the First Love!"; Transliteration: "Hatsukoi no Wedingu Kēki!" (Japanese: 初恋のウェディング·ケーキ!) | Yasuhiro Matsumura | Mitsuru Shimada | June 7, 2008 |
Amu's family receives a wedding invitation from Amu's cousin, Shuu. They go to the hotel where Shuu works and Amu finds him in the kitchen. Shuu's dream is to be a patissier and he is excited about his wedding and making his first wedding cake. When Shuu's fiancée, Eriko, arrives, Shuu sticks his foot in his mouth and earns a slap from Eriko. It appears that the wedding may be called off. To repair the situation, Amu appears in front of Eriko as Amulet Angel, but falls down. Eriko tells Amu about when she fell in love with Shuu and that she has no intention of calling off the wedding. However, Shuu's egg has become an X Character and Amu transforms into Amulet Clover and purifies it. Shuu, Eriko, and Amu make a new wedding cake together and the next day, the wedding goes without a hitch. When Eriko throws the bouquet, Amu catches it, and suddenly, Kairi, Kukai, Tadase, and Ikuto come into mind.
| 36 | "Golden Prince! *Part I*"; Transliteration: "Ōgon no Ōji! *Zenpen*" (Japanese: 黄金の王子! *前編*) | Yuji Himaki | Michiru Shimada | June 14, 2008 |
Shuraiya, a prince from a faraway country, makes a grand entrance to Seiyo Elementary to search for his future queen. Shuraiya also has a Guardian Character, Ramira. After seeing Amu transform into Amulet Heart and purify an X Egg, Shuraiya proposes to Amu. However, Amu refuses. Shuraiya informs the Guardians that the real reason he came to Seiyo Elementary was to find the Embryo. Shuraiya is searching for the Embryo because he despises his father and wants to succeed at something his father failed. Unable to obtain any information from the Guardians, Shuraiya demands to see Utau because she works for Easter and may know more about the Embryo. When Yukari learns of this from Kairi, she forms a plan using Nikaidou's old research. Later that night, Utau appears in disguise and hands the prince a pendant telling him that it is what he seeks.
| 37 | "Golden Prince! *Part II*"; Transliteration: "Ōgon no Ōji! *Kōhen*" (Japanese: 黄金の王子! *後編*) | Mamoru Enomoto | Kazuhiko Inukai | June 21, 2008 |
The pendant Shuraiya receives from Utau begins to change his personality. Pearl, Shuraiya's servant since childhood, finds Ramira suffering because of the pendant's dark energy. She brings him to the Guardians and tells them that she has been able to see Ramira. Ramira informs the guardians about what happened the night before. Meanwhile, Shuraiya extracts Saaya and her followers' eggs, which become X Characters. When the Guardians arrive, their Guardian Characters are captured and Ramira is turned into an X Egg. Pearl protects Ramira's egg to keep from turning into an X Character and explains to Shuraiya that his father cares for him deeply. Pearl's strong feelings give birth to her own Guardian Character who frees the other Guardian Characters. Amu and Rima transform and purify the X Characters and Ramira. Shuraiya apologizes to Pearl for his action and decides to return home and reconcile with his father.
| 38 | "Key, Lock, He and I!"; Transliteration: "Kī to Rokku to Aitsu to Atashi!" (Japanese: キーとロックとアイツとあたし!) | Shin Tosaka | Kazuhiko Inukai | June 28, 2008 |
Yukari tells Kairi to obtain the Humpty Lock from Amu. During a meeting, Kairi stares at Amu and the other Guardians believe he is in love with her. The next day, the Guardian Characters hold a secret meeting and El brings the lock with her. When Il and Yoru show up, a fight erupts. Amu and Kairi find the Guardian Characters and Kairi obtains the lock. Tsukumo, who works under Yukari, steals the lock from Kairi and runs off. Ikuto appears, praises Kairi for his "good job", and goes after Tsukumo. Amu attempts to Character Transform, but cannot without the lock. Ikuto, as Black Lynx, catches up with Tsukumo and stops him. When Amu catches up, the Humpty Lock and the Dumpty Key react. Ikuto tries to open the lock with the key, but Amu becomes scared and the lock rejects the key. Ikuto returns the lock to Amu and leaves.
| 39 | "Character Transformation! Platinum Royale!"; Transliteration: "Kyara Nari! Purachina Rowaiyaru!" (Japanese: キャラなり! プラチナロワイヤル!) | Hiromitsu Kanazawa | Makoto Nakamura | July 5, 2008 |
Easter is implementing its new project, the Black Diamond CD. It is rumored that a person will have their wish granted if they listen to it. Kairi slips one of the CDs into Tadase's bag. Tadase and Kiseki get into an argument and Kiseki runs off. At home, Tadase finds the CD in his bag. When Kiseki returns, he finds Tadase listening blankly to the CD and Kiseki becomes an egg. Kiseki goes to Amu for help and they find Tadase with a group of other children around a van playing the song from the Black Diamond CD. The music extracts X Eggs from everyone and an X appears on Kiseki's egg. Amu snaps Tadase out of his depression, and Tadase and Kiseki Character Transform into Platinum Royale. Together, they round up the X Eggs and purify them. Among the eggs, one sparkles more brightly than the others and disappears.
| 40 | "Rima! Unlock The Heart!"; Transliteration: "Rima! Kokoro no Anrokku!" (Japanese: りま! こころのアンロック!) | Takenori Mihara | Tomoko Koyama | July 12, 2008 |
As Kairi cooks for Yukari, she informs him that he has one last job to complete. Meanwhile, Rima's mother wants Rima to resign from the Guardians because of the shifting pickup times. At school, Amu informs the Guardians about the Black Diamond CDs and they agree to confiscate all of them. While collecting the CDs, Amu learns about Rima's resignation letter, but Rima never turns it in. That night, the van appears at the school and plays the music. Children gather around and their eggs are extracted. Amu and Tadase arrive and Character Transform, but are overwhelmed by the X Eggs. Rima receives a call from Amu and overhears the fight. Rima confronts her parents about how they bicker over her and keep her cooped up and then runs off to help. Working together, they purify the eggs, but discover Kairi with a bag of Black Diamond CDs.
| 41 | "True Self!"; Transliteration: "Honto no Jibun!" (Japanese: ホントのじぶん!) | Hiromitsu Kanazawa | Kazuhiko Inukai | July 19, 2008 |
The secret behind the Black Diamond CD is revealed and Kairi is conflicted about his sister's plans. Il becomes frustrated because Utau has been ignoring her recently. Meanwhile, the Guardians come to the realization that Kairi was an Easter spy. When Nikaidou gives the Guardians tickets to a special concert, the Guardians go to confront Kairi. As they arrive, they find Utau extracting X Eggs from the gathered crowd. Ikuto pulls Utau away and Kairi blocks the Guardians from chasing them. However, the X Eggs goes wild and form a blob. During the battle, Yaya Character Transforms into Dear Baby for the first time. Amu helps Kairi to remember his true self and Kairi Character Transforms into Samurai Soul. Together, they purify all of the X Eggs. After the battle, Tadase sees the sparkling egg again and Kairi informs the Guardians about Black Diamond's mainstream debut.
| 42 | "Utau Hoshina! The Last Battle!"; Transliteration: "Hoshina Utau! Saigo no Tatakai!" (Japanese: ほしな歌唄! 最後の戦い!) | Miho Hirao | Tomoko Koyama; Michiru Shimada | July 26, 2008 |
Yukari reviews her plan to find the Embryo to her supervisor. Afterwards, she remarks about how useless Iru is. Iru becomes furious, but Diamond reminds Iru about how Iru teased Eru for being useless. Tadase tells Amu about his past with Utau and Ikuto, and how Utau enjoyed singing. The next day, all five Guardians confront Utau for the last time. Amu unsuccessfully tries to remind Utau about how Utau enjoyed singing. Utau transforms with Iru and attacks Amu. However, when the other Guardians come to Amu's defense, Ikuto appears and prevents them. After Il is convinced by El to combine their powers to save Utau, they both side with Amu, and Amu transforms with Il, becoming Amulet Devil. However, Utau, angry at Iru abandonment, Character Transforms with Diamond. However, shortly after, Amu is finally able to believe in herself so Diamond returns to Amu and the X on her is lifted.
| 43 | "Character Transformation! Amulet Diamond!"; Transliteration: "Kyara Nari! Amyuretto Daiya!" (Japanese: キャラなり! アミュレットダイヤ!) | Masaru Yasukawa | Ryunosuke Kingetsu | August 2, 2008 |
With the X finally removed, Amu and Diamond Character Transform into Amulet Diamond. Utau becomes depressed that she lost to Amu, but Ami appears and helps remind Utau of her joy of singing. Yukari leaves in the helicopter, but the X Eggs stored on board hatch and escape. The Guardians battle the X Characters. Utau Character Transforms with El, becoming Seraphic Charm, and flies up with Amu to the out-of-control helicopter. Utau purifies the X Characters. However, Yukari falls and Utau catches her. Meanwhile, Amu guides the helicopter safely to the ground. When Yukari asks why Utau saved her, Utau responds that the two are partners. In the mix of the purified eggs, the shining egg appears again before flying off into the sky. Ikuto is shocked when Tadase mentions that it is the Embryo. Diamond returns to her egg, but tells Amu to remember the radiance is still within Amu.
| 44 | "Sparkle of the Heart!"; Transliteration: "Kokoro no Kirameki!" (Japanese: ココロのきらめき!) | Yuki Yase | Kazuhiko Inukai | August 9, 2008 |
It is summer vacation and Amu reflects on the time since the school year began. Meanwhile, Kairi is preparing to go back to his parents while reflecting on his time with the Guardians. Later, Amu, Yaya, Rima, and Tadase go to visit Kairi and help Utau and Yukari move into their new office. While celebrating the opening of the new business, Kairi reveals to the rest of the Guardians that he will be returning home to his parents and friends. But before Kairi boards the airplane, he confesses his love to Amu while declaring Tadase as his rival. Although flustered by the confession, Amu tells Kairi that they must certainly meet again in the future.
| 45 | "Go for it! Seiichiro!"; Transliteration: "Ganbare! Seiichirō!" (Japanese: がんばれ! 誠一郎!) | Kazunobu Shimizu | Makoto Nakamura | August 16, 2008 |
During attendance day, the Guardians announce that the school will be participating in a choir contest. Amu ends up with the lead part while Marimo is chosen as the pianist. Because Seiichiro is a bad singer, Marimo helps him practice by playing the piano with him, and tells him about her dream to keep playing the piano. During rehearsal, Marimo makes a simple mistake and Saaya and her group criticize Marimo for it. Marimo becomes upset and excuses herself from the rehearsal. The next day during the competition, Marimo does not show up. Because of Saaya's earlier criticism, Marimo's Heart's Egg turns into an X Egg and hatches. The Guardian Characters sense this and the Guardians, along with Seiichiro, go looking for Marimo. With Seiichiro's unwitting help, Amu transforms into Amulet Heart and purifies the X Character. The choir performs successfully, and Amu Character Changes to sing her solo.
| 46 | "Rima's Advent!? The Goddess of Comedy!"; Transliteration: "Rima Kōrin!? Owarai no Kamisama!" (Japanese: りま降臨!? お笑いの神様!) | Takenori Mihara | Tomoko Koyama | August 23, 2008 |
Rima wins two tickets to her favorite comedy show and asks Amu to come along. As Amu and Rima pass by a park, they see a girl, Miyako, practicing her comedy act. Rima, unsatisfied with Miyako's performance, offers to train Miyako. After a Character Change, Miyako believes Rima to be a "Goddess of Comedy" and accepts the training. The day of the auditions, Amu and Rima visit Miyako backstage when Higeshiro, the judge of the auditions, appears. However, Higeshiro feels insulted because Miyako was critical of his act. During the performance, Higeshiro severely ridicules Miyako and she runs off stage. When Amu and Rima finds her, an X Egg has already emerged and hatches. After purifying the X Character, the girls return to the stage where Higeshiro's act is failing. Miyako saves Higeshiro's act. After Rima admonishes Higeshiro for his act, he believes her to be the "Goddess of Comedy."
| 47 | "I'm Utau's Manager!?"; Transliteration: "Atashi ga Utau no Manējā!?" (Japanese: あたしが歌唄のマネージャー!?) | Shin Tosaka | Kazuhiko Inukai | August 30, 2008 |
While Amu is busy with her summer homework, she receives a call from Yukari. Yukari asks Amu to be Utau's manager for the day because Yukari is sick. Amu grudgingly accepts and accompanies Utau to the TV station. However, they find out that Utau's appearance was canceled. Utau explains that because she broke her contract by leaving Easter, her reputation and popularity has plummeted. Amu becomes determined to help Utau and the two search for a studio to debut Utau's latest single. However, their efforts are unsuccessful. They rest at a park and begin talking about Ikuto when an X Egg appears. While Amu transforms into Amulet Spade and runs to purify it, two more X Eggs appear and hatch. Realizing the X Characters need her song, Utau transforms with El and purifies them. This attracts attention from passersby and Utau begins singing her new song before the gathered crowd.
| 48 | "Asking a Favor of Yaya!"; Transliteration: "Yaya ni Onegai!" (Japanese: ややにお願い!) | Mamoru Enomoto | Kazuhiko Inukai | September 6, 2008 |
Summer vacation is over and the Guardians return to school. Tadase thinks Yaya needs special training and asks Kukai to help. When a group of third graders come to the Guardians for help finding a lost bird, Kukai suggests leaving the search to Yaya. After begging from both groups, Yaya gives in. Yaya searches all day, but is unable to find the bird. The next day, Yaya dresses dress up as a detective, after seeing a television program, and continues her search, with the other Guardians following her around. Although she keeps getting sidetracked, Yaya eventually finds a bird and catches it. However, it turns out to be her pediatrician's bird. Yaya returns to the third grade classroom to resume the search, but finds the bird already in its cage. Kukai tells the Guardians that the class found it on their own, because they could not leave Yaya alone.
| 49 | "The Secret of the Violin! Notes Dancing in the Wind!"; Transliteration: "Baiorin no Himitsu! Kaze ni Mau Onpu!" (Japanese: バイオリンの秘密! 風に舞う音符!) | Miho Hirao | Makoto Nakamura | September 13, 2008 |
Amu runs home and encounters Ikuto playing his violin. While Ikuto plays, Amu sings until one of the violin's strings breaks. Having no spare string, Ikuto and Amu go to a violin shop for repairs. At the shop, Amu meets Kotone, who has a crush on Ikuto and aspires to be a violin artisan. Another customer stops in and drops off two violins for repair, one of which the customer asks Kotone to repair. Kotone diligently works on the violin. After finishing, Kotone falls asleep, but knocks over a cup and spills tea onto the violin. When she wakes, Kotone notices that the tea has soaked into the violin's frame, panics, and runs off with the violin. When Amu finds Kotone, an X Egg emerges and hatches. Amu transforms with Miki and purifies the X Character. With encouragement from her father and the customer, Kotone continues repairing the violin.
| 50 | "Have We Really Found It?! The Embryo!"; Transliteration: "Maji de Hakken!? Enburio!" (Japanese: まじで発見!? エンブリオ!) | Susumu Kudo | Tomoko Koyama | September 20, 2008 |
One night, Kiseki sees the Embryo fly past him, but thinks it was just the moon. When Ikuto sees the Embryo the next day, he realizes that it is attracted to other eggs. Later, Kiseki tells Miki about his encounter with the Embryo, but Ran who was listening misunderstands and starts a series of telephone-like retellings. Kazuomi Hoshina, Ikuto's stepfather, has one of Easter's employees plant a tracking device on Ikuto, but Ikuto quickly notices it. The next night, the Guardian Characters go off to find the Embryo, but Su becomes separated from the group. When the Guardians notice their Guardian Characters are missing, they go search for them. They find Su and she leads them to the other Guardian Characters, which turns out to be one of Easter's labs. The Guardians discover an X Egg and Amu transforms with Su and purifies it. Afterward, Ikuto returns the tracking device to Kazuomi.
| 51 | "I'll Get the Embryo!"; Transliteration: "Enburio o Kono Te ni!" (Japanese: エンブリオをこの手に!) | Hiromitsu Kanazawa | Michiru Shimada | September 27, 2008 |
In a dream, Diamond asks Amu if she knows what her true wish is. Thinking about this, Amu encounters Nikaidou and Yukari. Nikaidou informs Amu that the Embryo should appear tonight. While the Guardians celebrate the news, Easters sets plans in motion to trap Amu and capture the Embryo. Ikuto learns of the trap and frees Amu. Meanwhile, hundreds of search devices powered by X Eggs search the city for the Embryo but go out of control. Amu rejoins the Guardians and together, they purify the X Eggs. The Embryo appears among the eggs, and Amu and Ikuto jump to grab it. One of Easter's researchers controlling the search devices accidentally launches a shell towards Ikuto and Amu, but Ikuto blocks it. Kukai and Tadase rescue them before they could hit the ground. Tadase declares to Ikuto that Tadase will never give anything up to Ikuto. Ikuto grins and leaves.

== See also ==
- List of Shugo Chara!! Doki episodes (52-102)
- List of Shugo Chara Party! episodes (103-127)
