= List of Shugo Chara Party! episodes =

- Japanese cover of first DVD compilation released by Pony Canyon.

Release
- Original network: TV Tokyo, TV Aichi, TV Hokkaido, TV Osaka, TV Setouchi, TVQ Kyushu Broadcasting
- Original release: October 3, 2009 – March 27, 2010

Series chronology
- ← Previous; Shugo Chara!! Doki—

Shugo Chara! Party! (しゅごキャラ！パーティー！, Shugo Kyara! Party!) is the 2009 sequel and third installment of the Japanese anime television series Shugo Chara!. Following directly after Shugo Chara!! Doki—, it aired as part of Shugo Chara! Party!. This third installment introduces a new anime-only character, Rikka Hiiragi, a transfer student who can understand X Eggs. The opening theme for the Shugo Chara!!! Dokki Doki segment is "Watashi no Tamago" (lit. My Egg) performed by Shugo Chara Egg!, while the opening for Shugo Chara Party! itself is "Party Time" by Guardians 4. The first ending is "Bravo! Bravo!" performed by Buono!. The second opening for Shugo Chara!!! Dokki Doki is "Arigatou ~Ookiku Kansha~" (lit. Thank You For Everything!) also performed by Shugo Chara Egg!, and the second opening for Shugo Chara! Party! is "Going On!", also performed by Guardians 4. The second ending is "Our Songs" also performed by Buono!. Although Party was originally thought to be a non-canon to the original series, it was revealed later on that it is a continuation of the story after the conclusion of the manga.

== Episode list ==
Season	Series	Title	Directed by	Written by	Original release date
1	103	"The Super-Peppy Transfer Student!"; Transliteration: "Genki Ippai Tenkōsei!" (Japanese: 元気いっぱい転校生!)	Takashi Hiroshi	Hiroshi Ōnogi	October 3, 2009
Amu and her Guardian Characters are on their way to school when they see a girl taking water to a flower. Amu comments on how kind that is. The girl gets flustered, and trips and almost crushes the flower, to be saved by Amu. The two introduce themselves. The girl's name is Rikka and she just transferred to Seiyo. Amu gets surprised when she's able to see Ran, Miki, Su, and Dia. On the way to school, Amu tries to explain everything to Rikka, who was distracted by a butterfly. In the Royal Garden, Amu tells the Guardians about her meeting with Rikka, but a commotion begins outside. Rikka is trying to save a cat from a tree branch. The branch breaks, and Rikka clutches the cat in fear as she falls. Amu Character Changes with Ran and saves her, while Tadase and Nagihiko get the branch. The Guardians tell Rikka to tell them or a teacher from now on if something happens. Rikka asks what a Guardian is, and after they tell her, Rikka wants to become one herself. Amu comments that she may one day since she sees Guardian Characters. Suddenly, the Guardian Characters sense an X Egg in the art room. They rush to find it, and Amu tells Rikka to stay put, who does the exact opposite. In the art room, Amu transforms into Amulet Spade and Tadase to Platinum Royale. Rikka catches up, and talks to the X Egg, commenting that it's sad because it can't draw well. The others, including the Guardian Characters, that's what becomes of an Egg. Rikka gets a little sad. At Rikka's apartment, Rikka lies on her bed, and lots of X Eggs come out from various places in her room. Rikka tells them she's going to try to be a Guardian.
2	104	"Enter the Guardian Apprentice!?"; Transliteration: "Tanjō! Gādian Minarai!?" (Japanese: 誕生! ガーディアン見習い!?)	Takashi Hiroshi	Hiroshi Ōnogi	October 10, 2009
The anime starts with Rikka, the new transfer student, waking up with dozens of X Eggs trying to wake her. She tries to purify the eggs from remembering Amu doing Open Heart in the previous episode, but failed. When she was walking to school she found yet another X Egg and tries to take care of it. In the Royal Garden, Tsukasa introduces the Guardians a new transfer student in 1st grade, Hikaru. Tsukasa tells the guardians that Hikaru will be a Guardian Apprentice for the time being until the other Guardians graduate. Later, they visit the sports field where Nagihiko tells Hikaru about Basketball. He challenges him to a one-on-one match, full court. Rima states that Hikaru, being a 1st grader, has no chance against Nagihiko, who is a 6th grader. Tadase states that since Hikaru has been studying all the time, he had no experience with physical sports. Hikaru manages to touch the ball and let it slip out of Nagihiko's hands. Nearing the end of the game, Tadase said that the other Guardians will be watering the flower bed. After the game, they hear screaming coming from the sports shed. Rikka, who was running towards it helped Amu and Nagihiko, who transformed into Amulet Heart and Beat Jumper. She said that the X Egg hated balls after failing tryouts, but both Amu and Nagihiko state that it was better if it was having fun with the game other than just jumping to conclusions. The egg is purified with Hikaru following after the newly purified egg had left. Nagihiko says that he should have waited for them, which Hikaru did not and stated that he is a Guardian Apprentice, with Rikka hearing that and having the dream of being a guardian, asks Amu to be one as well. Nagihiko and Amu started to think about what Tsukasa and Tadase would think about it and approved Rikka's "application".
3	105	"Sparkle my Heart! The Power of Song!"; Transliteration: "Kokoro Kagayake! Uta Pawā!" (Japanese: ココロ輝け! 歌パワー!)	Yasushi Muroya	Kimu Nekumi	October 17, 2009
Amu takes Rikka and Hikaru to an Utau concert and takes them backstage to let them meet her. Rikka becomes embarrassed and tells her when she hears her songs, she feels re-energized. Amu tells Utau that she wishes Ikuto could've come, but Utau tells her that he is traveling the world to find their father. The concert begins, and Rikka discovers one of the X Eggs have followed her. She tells Amu and Hikaru that she forgot something at home and runs off. It turns out that the X Egg loves Utau's songs. Diamond senses an X Egg nearby, and Amu transforms into Amulet Spade. Rikka tries to calm the X Egg down, but Hikaru tells her that she can't help and to just let Amu handle it. Amu uses Prism Music and tells the X Egg to listen to Utau's song. Amu tells the egg that Utau struggled a lot to get where she is now. The X Egg settles and Amu purifies it. They go back to watch the concert, and Utau says that she'll always keep singing no matter what. When the concert is over, the former Easter employees come to pick Hikaru up. Hikaru tells Rikka that she is fascinating and that he has never had someone like her in his life. He leaves, making Rikka angry, wondering how she is fascinating.
4	106	"Hikaru vs. Bunny?"; Transliteration: "Hikaru vs Usagi? Hatsu-shigoto wa Taihen!" (Japanese: ひかるvsウサギ? 初仕事は大変!)	Yasushi Muroya	Kinuko Kuwahata	October 24, 2009
Amu and Tadase arrange for Hikaru to take care of a rabbit. When he tries to feed it, he gets bitten and calls Amu a liar because she said it was tame. Ran, Miki, Su, and Diamond explain to Hikaru that the rabbit is timid and that he needs to gain its trust. He takes the rabbit out for a walk later on, but it runs off and into a patch of flowers; Rikka tries to stop it and nearly falls on them, but Hikaru manages to stop her. The two talk and the rabbit had eaten some flowers that make it ill. Amu's guardians characters suggest some ways to cure the illness, but Rikka yells at them for thinking of ways that can't help it. She lies down and strokes its back, and tells the story of if she was sick, her mom would do the same. The four guardian characters feel bad for Hikaru because his parents had died when he was little. Near the end, Hikaru is seen stroking the rabbit's back as an Easter worker comes to pick him up. He refuses to go home, but Tsukasa explained that he called a vet in to help. Hikaru wonders why people care for such annoying things, and Tsukasa explains that they're a lot of work, but you can't help but fall in love with them. The next day, Rikka, Amu, and Hikaru run towards the pen to see the rabbit healthy and up again, and Hikaru feels warmth in his heart.
5	107	"Yaya's Enthusiastic Gardening!"; Transliteration: "Yaya no Harikiri Gādeningu!!" (Japanese: ややの張り切りガーデニング!!)	Takashi Hiroshi	Nobuaki Yamaguchi	October 31, 2009
Hikaru and Rikka are helping Yaya take care of the flower beds. Yaya is working hard to take care of the flowers, along with Hikaru and Rikka. Amu and her guardian characters notice and say it's a little out of character for her. Yaya notices them watching and tells them to come help. Later the next day, Rikka is taking care of the flowers by herself, not knowing Yaya had to stay after class. Suddenly, a X Egg emerges from behind some flowers. Rikka wonders where it came from, but then asks if it wanted to help her out since she was getting lonely. Meanwhile, Yaya is hurrying to the flower beds, with Amu following her. When they arrive, the X Egg has made the flowers huge. Amu and Yaya transform into Amulet Clover and Dear Baby. The X Egg begins doing a trick, trying to surprise them. Amu asks Rikka what the egg is saying, and Rikka tells her that it wanted to become a magician, but it could never impress anybody. It does another trick, messing up the flower beds, and Rikka is impressed. She says that it could become a magician, but Hikaru says that the trick was boring. Amu agrees, saying that it will only cause people problems if it goes on like that. She says it is bound to come up with some good ideas and finally purifies it. The flowers are still messed up. Rikka apologizes, saying that it's all her fault, but Miki tells her to leave it to Amu. Amu uses Remake Honey to give life back to the flowers, amazing Rikka. Amu tells her to do her best to take care of the flowers tomorrow. Meanwhile, Remake Honey seemed to have turned Yaya back to her old spoiled self, causing her to throw a fit on the ground and tell them to take care of her.
6	108	"The Place Eggs Return To"; Transliteration: "Tamago no Kaeru Basho!" (Japanese: たまごの帰る場所!)	Yūsaku Saotome	Miya Asakawa	November 7, 2009
Rikka gets distracted from working in the Royal Garden, and goes off to get Yaya and Hikaru at the flower beds. Ran, Miki, Su, Diamond, and KusuKusu were asked to go with her so she doesn't get distracted. Along the way, Rikka finds a bird egg which fell from its nest. She tries to climb up the tree, but fails. The guardian characters than bring the egg back into the bird's nest. Rikka then asks the guardian characters what happens when a X Egg is purified but the owner already has a new heart egg. Ran and the others were unable to answer the question, and soon arrived at the sports field. When they reach the sports field, Rikka spots a X Egg and runs after it. The X Egg is very clumsy and bumps into many things while trying to run away. Ran and the others go back to Amu and Rima telling them about the X Egg. Amu gets to the sports field and purifies the X Egg. Amu then scolds Rikka about going after X Eggs by herself, however, Rikka gets distracted and ignores Amu. Ran, Miki, Su, and Diamond follow Rikka, guiding her to the purified heart egg's owner. Rikka then learns what happens when a heart's egg is purified.
7	109	"Welcome Back, Nadeshiko!"; Transliteration: "Okaeri! Nadeshiko!" (Japanese: おかえり! なでしこ!)	Yūsaku Saotome	Toshizō Nemoto	November 14, 2009
Amu and Rima come across a poster, much to Amu's surprise, announcing an upcoming performance by Nadeshiko just as Nagihiko comes along and is dragged into a predicament. Amu begs to him that she wants to see Nadeshiko. The three of them go to the stage the performance is going to be held and Amu asks to see Nadeshiko. Nagihiko worries and quickly changes into Nadeshiko, surprising both girls. The charas meet again, KusuKusu almost spilling the beans. After many more wardrobe changes, a Character Change, and Rima's teasing, they all take a walk as Nadeshiko explains that she has missed Amu and always thinks of her. To interrupt this "reunion" a soccer ball is taken over by a X Egg and Amu and Nadeshiko transform into Amulet Heart and Yamato Maihime. Nadeshiko performs a new attack "Robe of Feathers: Dance of the Cherry Blossoms" as Amu uses Open Heart. At the end, Nadeshiko explains that she found her true dance and performs on stage. Later at school, Rima once again gives Nagi a hard time, saying that the only reason he keeps on being Nadeshiko is not to please Amu, but that he likes to "cross-dress" much to Nagihiko's disgust. The two come to terms as Rima cutely pronounces his name and asks him to treat her to a parfait after school for keeping his secret from Amu.
8	110	"The Miraculous Character Change!"; Transliteration: "Miwaku no Kyara Chenji!" (Japanese: 魅惑のキャラチェンジ!)	Mamoru Enomoto	Nobuaki Yamaguchi	November 21, 2009
Amu and Tadase are on their way home when Yoru sends Amu a picture of Ikuto sleeping, and causes her to blush. When Tadase asks Amu to join him to the park, she tries to hide her nervousness. Ran then Character Changes with Amu to help her express her honesty, and inefficiently catches Rikka's attention. Rikka learns about Character Changing and views Amu's different personality changes: Su turns Amu into a girly maiden, Miki turns her into an artist. Then, they ask Diamond to Character Change with Amu, because they had never seen it before. Diamond fulfills their request and Character Changes with Amu, thus turning her into a sparkling person and smile, much to their disappointment. Later, Amu runs to the park to meet Tadase. Tadase expresses his feelings to Amu. Ran then Character Changes with Amu to make her express her feelings just as Rikka arrives to watch the occasion, but Amu accidentally destroys a sand castle that two kids had made. Miki then Character Changes with Amu again to remake the sand castle, but her passion to art causes her to make an overwhelmingly big castle. Rikka asks Miki to help her finish an artistic homework of clay by Character Changing with her. Miki then tells her that Guardian Characters can only use Character Change on their bearers, which disappoints Rikka. Just then, Amu, Tadase and their Guardian Characters arrive. Amu volunteers to help Rikka with her homework. And though Rikka felt hopeless at first, Tadase tells her how Amu's desire to do her best makes her special, which encourages Rikka to direct her energy into doing her best. Eventually, Rikka is able to make a catfish out of clay. Rikka accidentally says the word "prince" in front of Tadase, and unwittingly triggers his Character Change. The changed Tadase forces Rikka to give him ´massage, and Rikka finds the scary side of Character Changing, despite she found it fun at first.
9	111	"But Why!? Rima-senpai!"; Transliteration: "Dōshite!? Rima-senpai!" (Japanese: どうして!? りま先輩!)	Mamoru Enomoto	Hiroshi Ōnogi	November 28, 2009
Rikka drags Amu to the flower beds, showing her the new buds that have grown. Rima follows them and says that they need to thin out the flowers, because the buds can't absorb sunlight properly if they're too close together. Rikka disagrees, saying all buds should have a chance to become flowers. Amu tries to reason with Rikka, but she misunderstands and runs off. Later on, she finds an X Egg. She starts to say that the egg isn't needed. The X Egg quickly retreats, Rikka running after it. Amu and Rima discover the X Egg and transform into Amulet Heart and Clown Drop. Rikka explains to them that the egg wants to be a baseball player, but is no good at catching the ball. Amu tells the egg that it won't happen if it doesn't try. Amu purifies the egg. Rikka sees that the buds that Rima pulled out were now set in individual pots. Amu tells her that Rima is actually a very kind person. Rikka understands now that every bud has the potential to grow. Rikka calls Rima super amazing, causing Rima to blush furiously and become modest.
10	112	"Eh! Tadase-kun has a crush on someone!?" Transliteration: "Eh! Tadase-kun ni Suki na Hito!?" (Japanese: えっ! 唯世(ただせ)くんに好きな人!?)	Yūki Yase	Miya Asakawa	December 5, 2009
Amu, Ran, Miki, Su, and Diamond overhear Tadase talking to Kukai. He says that there is a girl he that is always on his mind and he can't sleep at night when he thinks over her. He also says that she is really cute. Kukai decides to help Tadase with the girl. Amu is shocked and devastated. Her stubborn character comes out again and at the Royale Garden Kukai stops by and meets Rikka and Hikaru. Hikaru addresses him as the former jack who stops by because he has nothing to do. Kukai defends himself by saying that he gives the Guardian's advice and brings up Tadase's "cute little problem". Amu goes home and consoles herself with food. Amu's Shugo Chara go to Tadase's to investigate and see him, Kukai, and a pretty girl conversing. Kiseki sees them and apologizes that he and Tadase already have a guest before he could finish his line Amu's Shugo Chara yell at him angrily then go home. Amu is in bed and her phone rings. She runs over to pick it up thinking it is Tadase, but it is Ikuto. Ikuto guesses that Amu was dumped by Tadase and hits the mark. Ikuto teases Amu that if he were there he would kiss her and give her a hug to console her. Amu's Shugo Chara tell her about the girl and Amu decided to confront Tadase. An X Egg appears and is upset because it was dumped and never wants to love again. Amu can't talk to it because she feels the same way and agrees with it. Tadase intervenes and says that Even if you are dumped that you should not give up on love because like them you can fall in love with someone else too. Amu purifies the X Egg and Tadase explains that it was a cute female dog and that he had asked Kukai to find a foster home for her. The girl who was there had been the one to take the dog in. Again Tadase says "I love you" to Amu which causes her to blush.
11	113	"Sparkling Treasure!"; Transliteration: "Kira kira na Takaramono!" (Japanese: キラキラな宝物!)	Mizuno Kentarō	Kinuko Kuwahata	December 12, 2009
Hikaru's Grandfather gives him a brand new fountain pen, as a gift for joining Seiyo Elementary School, but he says he doesn't use a fountain pen but keeps it anyway. Rikka loses her special treasure, a necklace that her dad gave her when she entered elementary school, and is desperately retracing her steps in order to find it. Amu and her Guardian Characters all help Rikka out, but Hikaru doesn't understand what all the fuss is about. Hikaru can't comprehend how something as trivial as a gift from someone can be so precious. Amu and her Guardian Characters help Rikka to find it. At the end of the episode Hikaru puts the pen on his pocket, when his grandfather sees it he becomes very happy and Hikaru smiles a little too.
12	114	"Exhausted~ Amu-chan, Becomes a Mommy?"; Transliteration: "Hero hero~ Amu-chan, Mama ni Naru?" (Japanese: へろへろ～あむちゃん、ママになる?)	Miho Hirao	Nobuaki Yamaguchi	December 19, 2009
It's finally Sunday, but Amu has a ton of homework to do. However, Amu's mom and dad both have things to do so they leave Amu to tend to Ami, along with household chores. Amu says she has no choice but to do it, and does all the chores. Ami asks Amu to play with her, but Amu says she is busy. Ami goes to Amu's room and starts playing "Cameraman" with Amu's Guardian Characters. Amu tells her to play outside instead and Ami does just that. Ami is at the playground playing with water guns and Amu is watching her. Hikaru finds her and asks what she's doing. Amu tells him and he says he is buying a new eraser. Ami comes over and tells Hikaru to play with her, then shoots some water in his face. Amu apologizes for Ami and they have a water gun war. Finally, when it's over, Hikaru leaves and Amu takes Ami home to feed her. She also gives her a bath. Ami's face gets red from staying in the bath too long, but Amu thinks she is ill. She puts Ami in her bed and searches for medicine, panicking. Ami tells her to be quiet because she can't sleep. Amu is relieved and watches Ami sleep. Ami puts her hand over Amu's and calls her mom. Amu falls asleep beside Ami. When their parents find them, they take a picture. The next morning, everyone is downstairs eating breakfast except Amu, who is rushing to get her homework finished.
13	115	"My Would-Be Self!"; Transliteration: "Naritai Atashi!" (Japanese: なりたいあたし!)	Ishiodori Hiroshi	Toshizō Nemoto	December 26, 2009
Amu and the others follow after their Guardian Characters when they sense something strange, and come across a young girl who has lost her heart's egg. The girl is holding a broken stuffed animal in her hand, but they don't know what happened. As they search for the X Egg, Rikka begins to think about who she wants to be.
14	116	"First Time Meeting this X Character!?"; Transliteration: "Shotaimen! Kore ga Kakeru (Batsu) Kyara!?" (Japanese: 初対面! これが×(バツ)キャラ!?)	Takashi Hiroshi	Miya Asakawa	January 9, 2010
Rikka continues to think about what kind of person she wants to become, but she can't come up with anything. Amu and the gang try to give her suggestions, but she just gets frustrated. Just then, an X Egg appears. As it's the first X Character she's ever seen, Rikka tries to calm it down, but it begins to attacks her. She then runs around saying "Mukatsuku!" (English:How Annoying!) over and over again. Amu tells the X character that it's tough being angry all the time and purifies it. They run to Rikka's aid and she starts to cry, saying that she felt sorry for the X character. Rikka wipes up her tears, and says that not all people are strong. Back at home, Rikka says she kind of understands how the X Eggs feel now and playfully try to remove their X's.
15	117	"Stop Fighting!"; Transliteration: "Kenka wa Yamete!" (Japanese: ケンカはやめて!)	Daisuke Tsukushi	Hiroshi Ōnogi	January 16, 2010
Rikka's friend, Kimi tries to read her hand, and asks Hikaru if he wants to do it too. But he thinks its unscientific which upsets Kimi. Rikka talks to Hikaru about why did he hurt Kimi, and he asks if Rikka herself understands Kimi's feelings. Rikka gets angry and slaps Hikaru. Amu sees them and try to stop their fighting but Rikka gets mad and thinks that Amu didn't listen to her. Neither of them have many regrets until they are late for the meeting in the Royal Garden. Hikaru comes, Tadase and Nagihiko try their best to convince Hikaru that he should apologize to Rikka. Rima and Amu went to find Rikka but could not find her. There appears an X Egg, who wanted to have friends but Rikka says she's not going to tell Amu that. However Amu herself talks to the X Egg and Rikka listens and understands that she should apologize to Hikaru too and tells Amu why the egg put an X on it. At the end Rikka and Hikaru apologize to each other, shake hands and make up. The next morning when Rikka wakes up she sees a Guardian Egg on her bed.
16	118	"Go, Rikka! Follow the Way of the Guardians"; Transliteration: "Susume, Rikka! Gādian no Machi" (Japanese: 進めりっか! ガーディアンへの道)	Mamoru Enomoto	Kimu Nekumi	January 23, 2010
Rikka is excited to have her Guardian egg, and she tries to get it to hatch. However, it does not. She goes to school and tells Yaya, Amu and then Nagihiko, which immediately ends when people realize Nagihiko and Amu together. Later, the Hikaru and the girls are picking up trash. Suddenly, two boys start talking about how the Guardians are there only to pick up trash. Rikka gets upset and ask Amu and Yaya what the use of the Guardians was. She doesn't understand and runs off, only to find an X Egg. Amu purifies it with the help of Miki and Dear Baby. The next morning, Amu and Yaya find Rikka picking up more trash. The same two boys are making fun of the Guardians again, and Amu, Yaya, and Rikka defend the group. Rikka gets the wrong impression from the conversation she had with the other girls the day before, and Yaya has a good feeling that Rikka's egg won't hatch any time soon.
17	119	"Turn, Turn! A Spinning World!"; Transliteration: "Gurun Gurun! Mawaru Sekai!" (Japanese: ぐるんぐるん! まわる世界!)	Mamoru Enomoto	Toshizō Nemoto	January 30, 2010
As Hikaru is researching the bar, Amu, Nagihiko, and Rikka comes by and helps Hikaru, telling him to just try and that he might have fun. Mainwhile, a X Egg who is from the volleyball team comes by and starts to attack the 4, telling them that it is never able to play in a game since it is not very good. Amu tells it not to give up, but also gave up herself at trying to do a spin on the bar. Amu tries her best to do a spin and succeeded, then purified the X Egg. Hikaru then decides to give spinning on the bar a try. He then realizes it was fun after succeeding.
18	120	"An Exciting Picnic!"; Transliteration: "Doki Doki no Pikuniku!" (Japanese: どっきどきのピクニック!)	Mariko Itō	Kinuko Kuwahata	February 6, 2010
Amu and Hikaru all head out with Rikka's family together for a picnic, but Hikaru doesn't seem to understand what's so fun about it. But as he spends time with Rikka's parents, Hikaru starts to understand a little about what it's like having a family.
19	121	"Utau's Wavering Heart"; Transliteration: "Utau, Yureru Kokoro" (Japanese: 歌唄(うたう)、揺れるココロ!)	Mariko Itō	Kinuko Kuwahata	February 13, 2010
Utau storms out of a recording session for her new song because the director tells her to sing in some other way but she refuses, and goes to eat ramen with Kukai to cool her head. But when even her favorite ramen shop changes their recipe in response to customer feedback, Utau get mad and Kukai tells her at times like this she should go talk to her 'female friend' and that 'female friend' is none other than Amu. Amu is shocked when Utau appears at her house, but Amu's family is very happy to see Utau. The two of them go out to talk. Then, an X Egg, which kept saying 'I don't wanna,' appears. Utau get annoyed and says to it "Why don't you try the thing you don't want to; maybe it turn out to be more greater than you ever thought." Amu says that Utau's right. Just then, Utau realizes that her behaviour in the studio was wrong. Amu purifies the X Egg and Utau says 'Thank You' to Amu, though she didn't know what Utau meant. Utau goes back to the studio and apologizes to the director and records the new song.
20	122	"Shock! My Egg got an X on it?" Transliteration: "Doki! Tamago ni X (batsu) ga Tsuichatta?" (Japanese: どきっ! たまごに×(バツ)が付いちゃった?)	Kazunori Minagawa	Kimu Nemuki	February 20, 2010
Rikka worries about her egg because it didn't hatch yet. She becomes depressed and her egg got a X on it. She wants Amu to purify it but, she thinks Amu will hate her because her egg has a X on it. Then, Amu tells her that she once had a X Egg. Rikka becomes happier and her egg hatches.
21	123	"Nice to Meet You, My Name Is Hotaru."; Transliteration: "Hajimemashite, Hotaru to Moushimasu" (Japanese: 初めまして、ほたると申します。)	Yūki Yase	Miya Asakawa	February 27, 2010
Rikka rushes to school and informs Amu that her egg has hatched. Hotaru, who is Rikka's guardian character, gets along with everybody. The Guardians tell her that next year she will become a full-fledged Guardian since she now has a Guardian Character. They ask her to perform a speech, but Rikka worries and says that she will screw it up. Hotaru quickly character changes with Rikka, improving her posture and speaking formally. However, when the day comes to read the speech, Rikka hesitates as she sees all the students watching her. She drops the papers, and scatters to pick them up. Amu was going to help, but Tadase stops her. Rikka asks Hotaru why she didn't character change with her and because of this was the reason she messed up. Hotaru says that it's fine to make mistakes, and that Rikka should do just that when she's learning new things. Rikka realizes that it's okay and performs the speech without even character changing.
22	124	"Hikaru and Fun Amusement Park!"; Transliteration: "Hikaru to Tanoshii Yuuenchi!" (Japanese: ひかると楽しい遊園地!)	Hazuki Mizumoto	Hiroshi Ōnogi	March 6, 2010
Amu and Rikka notice that Hikaru never laughs or shows any facial expression, so Amu decides to take Hikaru out to an amusement park to try to make him laugh. When they get there on Sunday, the bars are locked. But with a simple click of his fingers, Hikaru unlocks the gate. He explains that Easter has bought the amusement park and is planning to re-open it soon. They go onto the ferris wheel first, only to realize that Hotaru is unexpectedly suffering acrophobia. She says that she is okay flying at Rikka's height, but any higher than that and she becomes dizzy. They go on a series of rides and finish off with the spinning teacup, when Amu thinks back to her "date" with Ikuto. When they step off the cup, Amu, Rikka and their Charas are all dizzy and can't seem to walk properly. When Hikaru steps off, he collapses straight onto the ground, stunned. Amu and Rikka crowd around him and asks what's wrong. Hikaru then starts to roll around, laughing. Miki thinks that Hikaru hit his head, but Hikaru explains that everything was okay and that he found it unbelievable that he couldn't control his body after spinning so much, before laughing some more. Amu and Rikka are shocked for a second, then realize what's happened. They both then decide to spin some more and collapse in a dizzy heap, laughing. Hikaru and Rikka fall holding hands. Rikka says that Hikaru's smile is really something. Amu looks on and smiles.
23	125	"Oh No! Rikka and X Eggs?"; Transliteration: "Taihen! Rikka to Batsu Tama ga?" (Japanese: 大変！ りっかと×たまが？)	Kyoko Kametani	Toshizō Nemoto	March 13, 2010
Rikka is getting closer and closer to Hotaru, and starting to ignore the X Eggs. Amu the other Guardians are getting ready for graduation, and Yaya's sad that she won't be the youngest anymore. Hikaru tells her that she can be the leader from behind the scenes, and still have her baby character. Nagihiko makes a comment to Tadase that Hikaru's way of speaking hasn't changed, but the meaning behind it has. Meanwhile, not happy that they're being forgotten, the X Eggs try to help Rikka by bringing her forgotten paints to her, and cleaning up her room. But due to some mistakes they just make the mess worse. Rikka finds the X Eggs who tried to bring her paints to her but almost gets caught by Hikaru, making her go mad at the X Eggs. She takes them home and notices the incredible mess the other X Eggs have made. She goes mad and yells that she never wants to see them again. The eggs are so upset that they create a tornado. Hikaru opens the door to her room and sees the worried expression on Rikka's face. Hotaru yells at him to get Amu and the others. He runs to get Amu and the other Guardians. He trips, but Rikka's desperate facial expression makes him get up and keep running. When he reaches the Guardians, Hikaru begs Amu not to blame Rikka for whatever she sees. Amu promises that she will never lose belief in Rikka or Hikaru. After the X Eggs leave Rikka sees one that stayed behind and smiles, thinking that it chose to forgive her. But then suddenly it breaks. Being Rikka's first time seeing an X Egg break it alarms her. She picks up the pieces of the remaining X Egg and cries.
24	126	"Believe! In My Pure Heart!"; Transliteration: "Shinjite! Atashi no Pure Heart!" (Japanese: 信じて！ あたしのピュアハート！)	Mariko Itō	Kimu Nemuki	March 20, 2010
Amu and Tadase separate with the rest of the guardians and make their way to Rikka's room, inside, they find her room all messed up and torn. They notice Rikka hunched over crying as she explains that she was hiding X Eggs in her room. She begins explaining about the X Egg 'bursting' and Tadase explains that under too much stress, the egg will break. Rikka starts crying again as Amu gets angry and yells at Rikka, knocking some senses into her. She transforms with Diamond and heads towards the rest of the guardians. Amu uses Twinkle Hold but it failed. Rikka approaches the X Eggs only to have them back away. One egg is close to cracking but Rikka leaps towards the egg, stopping it from breaking. She promises to the other eggs that she would not make them feel lonely anymore. This triggers her transformation with Hotaru into Pure Feeling. Together, Amu and Rikka purify the eggs using Open Heart, and the eggs thank Rikka for the good times they had and that she listened to them, before returning to their owners again. After that, Amu goes home only to find that Ikuto is hiding under the blankets of her bed.
25	127	"Heartbeat of Heartbeat!!!"; Transliteration: "Dokki Doki no Dokki Doki!!!" (Japanese: どっきどきのドッキドキ!!!)	Mamoru Enomoto	Hiroshi Ōnogi	March 27, 2010
When Amu came to her room she saw Ikuto, Ikuto explains to Amu that he is back in town to fill out papers to join an orchestra. Amu's mom comes into Amu's room and Amu finds out that Ikuto was there with her permission. He takes Amu out to the amusement park and they ride on the merry-go-round. Ikuto says he wants to play the "prince character" and then takes it back saying that it's not his character. Amu falls off the horse and Ikuto catches her. Tadase appears, invited by Ikuto. Ikuto parts from Amu and Tadase again, telling her to grow up already. Seeing how sad Amu appears to be, Tadase kisses Amu on the cheek, saying he will always be there for her which leads to calling him "prince". Afterwards, Rikka is officially declared as the new Queen's chair and everyone discovers that Hikaru's egg has been born. Several days later, pictures are seen that everyone is at the amusement park and Ikuto is playing his violin on the streets of Europe. Tsukasa is watching him perform, and Lulu is sipping tea. The anime series ends with a giant "Thank you~!!" from the cast and characters of Shugo Chara!!

== See also ==
- List of Shugo Chara! episodes (01-51)
- List of Shugo Chara!! Doki episodes (52-102)
