= List of Shugo Chara! characters =

Shugo Chara! is a Japanese shōjo manga created by the manga author duo Peach-Pit. The story centers on elementary schoolgirl Amu Hinamori, whose popular exterior, referred to as "cool and spicy" by her classmates, contrasts with her introverted personality. When Amu wishes for the courage to be reborn as her would-be self, she is surprised to find three colorful eggs the next morning, which hatch into three Guardian Characters: Ran, Miki, and Su.

Cast of Shugo Chara! from the first anime series.

Peach-Pit uses Amu to explore differences between one's true self and the self that is presented to others. Like Jun Sakurada in Peach-Pit's previous work, Rozen Maiden, Amu tackles issues such as alienation and fitting in at school. Unlike most heroines in other magical girl series, Amu is neither the perfect sweetheart nor a complete klutz. Amu gets grumpy and frequently talks back to others in contrast to the polite schoolgirls that fill the genre.

Amu's Guardian Characters—Ran, Miki, Su, and later Dia—aid her in her quest of self-discovery. Each Guardian Character represents an aspect of Amu's true self. Ran represents Amu's desire to be more honest and athletic, Miki represents Amu's desire to be more level headed and artistic, Su represents Amu's desire to be more caring and improve her domestic skills, while Diamond represents Amu's desire to shine in front of others and be a good speaker. Moreover, the Guardian Characters are more than mere mascots who help Amu learn about her true self. They can also perform a "Character Change" where Amu's personality is replaced by an entirely different one.

However, Amu is not the only one with Guardian Characters. Each of the Guardians—Tadase Hotori, Nadeshiko Fujisaki, Kukai Soma, and Yaya Yuiki—have their own Guardian Characters. Amu also encounters Ikuto Tsukiyomi and Utau Hoshina(Tsukiyomi), two siblings who also have Guardian Characters and are employed by the Easter Company to search for the Embryo.

Eventually, Nadeshiko Fujisaki and Kukai Soma leave the Guardians and are replaced by Rima Mashiro and Kairi Sanjo, respectively. Kairi later leaves and is replaced by Nagihiko Fujisaki, Nadeshiko's real identity.

== Main characters ==
=== Amu Hinamori ===
Amu Hinamori (日奈森 あむ, Hinamori Amu), the series' protagonist, is a student at Seiyo Elementary School. Amu's classmates see her as "cool and spicy". She can be identified as a tsundere (cold and mean to opening up to other people), but her true character is shy and timid. Part of the reason for this misunderstanding is the trendy punk goth clothing her mother buys for her as well as the way she expresses her shyness. However, when Amu wishes for the courage to become her would-be self, three colorful eggs appear. When they hatch, they reveal Amu's Guardian Characters: Ran, Miki, and Su.

Amu becomes a member of the Guardians, the school's student council, and discovers that each member has a Guardian Character. Amu's position with the Guardians is the Joker. Her task as the Joker is to search for and purify X Eggs and X Characters (also, in the second season, she purifies Mystery Eggs, the corrupted forms of people's would-be selves). Ran, Miki, and Su help Amu with her task through a process called Character Transformation, which is enabled by the Humpty Lock and grants Amu special abilities depending on the Guardian Character. Later on, Amu also creates a fourth egg, known as Diamond. In the second season, when Amu shows her true potential, the Humpty Lock increases in power. Thus, new transformation scenes are used.

Amu's main love interests are Tadase Hotori and Tsukiyomi Ikuto. Throughout the first half of the series, Amu has a crush on Tadase and blushes every time she is in his presence. She initially regarded Ikuto as a jerk and pervert, but she grew close to him as he aided her countless times. When Ikuto first confesses his love to her, she thinks he is teasing her and dismisses him. When Tadase asks Amu if it is okay for him to fall in love with her, she is thrilled at the progress in their relationship but soon finds herself drawn to Ikuto. She is saddened when Ikuto decides to leave in search of his father. Because of this, she realizes that she truly loves Ikuto. After he confesses to her and kisses her close to the lips, she refuses to admit her feelings for him, which prompts Ikuto to make a deal with her that he will get her to fall in love with him. In chapter 48, Amu confesses to Tadase's older self that she had liked him for his outer character. Although they have a much better relationship than before, Amu remains stubborn about her feelings for Ikuto. In the final chapter of Shugo Chara Encore, she is happy to reunite with him and is seen holding hands with him at Sanjou and Nikaidou's wedding. Amu's primary rival is Utau Hoshina, Ikuto's younger sister, who is jealous that Ikuto shows an interest in Amu instead of her. They soon become good friends after Utau leaves Easter.

Amu gains the Dumpty Key from Yoru and uses it to unlock the Humpty Lock. In some of the later chapters, when Amu opens the Humpty Lock with the Dumpty Key, she and Tadase see more of Ikuto's past. Their journey ends when the Amu Character transforms with Diamond, and she and Ikuto fight briefly. Ran, Miki, Su, and Diamond all combine their powers, making the Amu character transform into Amulet Fortune and the Ikuto character transform into Seven Seas Treasure.

Amu ventures to the Eggs' Cradle, a place where unborn and "lost" Shugo Chara reside, to search for four coloured shards representing each of her Shugo Chara in an attempt to bring Ran, Miki and Su back. In chapter 44, Diamond tells Amu that Ran, Miki and Su have "disappeared" and that she will help Amu find them as her "navigator". Diamond becomes Amu's guide in the Eggs' Cradle in Amu's search for the four coloured shards. She finally comes to terms with the loss of her Guardian Characters at the end of the journey, however as she returns she realizes that she has Ran, Miki, Su and Diamond back in Egg form much to her relief and later joy as they are reborn later in Shugo Chara! Encore. In the anime television series, Amu is voiced by Kanae Itō. She is portrayed by Yuuka Maeda in the musical.

Ran (ラン)
Ran is the first to hatch from Amu's eggs and represents her desire to be more honest, confident and athletic. Ran is frequently cheering Amu on. During Character Change, Amu gains increased athletic abilities. During Character Transformation, Amu becomes Amulet Heart, with a cheerleader inspired outfit. In chapter 38, Ran undergoes a new Character Transformation, along with Miki, Su, and Diamond becoming Amulet Fortune. In chapter 44, she disappears along with Miki and Su, and later Diamond as well when Amu no longer needs them. In Shugo Chara! Encore at the very end of the last chapter, she and Amu's other Shugo Chara emerge and hatch again at Sanjou and Nikaidou's wedding much to Amu's joy. Her theme color is pink. In the anime television series, Ran is voiced by Kana Asumi.

Miki (ミキ)
The second Guardian Character to hatch is Miki. Miki represents Amu's desire to be sharper, level headed, and artistic. Miki also helps Amu make fashion choices. Reflecting Amu's love interests, Miki has shown an interest in Tadase's Guardian Character, Kiseki; Ikuto's Guardian Character, Yoru; Kukai's Guardian Character, Daichi; and Nagihiko's Guardian Character, Rhythm. During Character Change, Amu gains increased artistic abilities. During Character Transformation, Amu becomes Amulet Spade. In chapter 38, Miki undergoes a new Character Transformation with Ran, Su, and Diamond becoming Amulet Fortune. In Shugo Chara! Doki, Miki is the only one of Amu's Guardian Characters to be able to sense Mystery Eggs clearly. In chapter 44, she disappears along with Ran and Su, and later Diamond as well when Amu no longer needs them. In Shugo Chara Encore, she returns along with the others and together they catch the wedding bouquet for Amu who accidentally threw it back in the air again. Her theme color is blue. In the anime television series, Miki is voiced by Nanae Katō.

Su (スゥ, Sū)
The third Guardian Character, Su, represents Amu's desire to be more caring, sensitive and improve her domestic skills. However, Su is prone to silly mistakes. She is very fond of Amu's teacher, Yuu Nikaidou. Amu cooking and cleaning skills improve during Character Change. She also becomes "too girly". During Character Transformation, Amu becomes Amulet Clover with an outfit just like Su's. In chapter 38, Su undergoes a new Character Transformation with Ran, Miki, and Diamond becoming Amulet Fortune. In chapter 44, she disappears along with Miki and Ran, and later Diamond as well when Amu no longer needs them. She and the others make an unexpected return toward the end of the last chapter of Shugo Chara Encore as they appear to be reborn from Amu's feelings. Her theme color is green. In the anime television series, Su is voiced by Aki Toyosaki.

Diamond (ダイヤ, Daiya)
Diamond is Amu's fourth Guardian Character. Diamond represents Amu's desire to calmer and more optimistic. She is shown to be an air-headed character who always speaks with a soft voice. In Japanese versions, her name is shortened to Dia. She is a unique Guardian Character, who only appears and uses her powers when she senses Amu's strong desire to help others. Before hatching, she became an X Egg and left after Amu lost confidence in adjusting to the changes happening in the spring semester. Her egg is later found by Utau, while collecting X Eggs with Yukari. Unusually, she is not shaped like the usual X Character; she looks like a normal Guardian Character, but with a white X-shaped clip covering her black diamond-shaped clip. Because of this, Amu does not know her true name. X-Diamond is able to character change with Utau to extract more X-eggs from people. They can also Character Transform with Utau, becoming Dark Jewel, however, the transformation does not last very long. When Amu is finally able to prove to Diamond that she does have enough confidence to shine she reverts into her true original form. Together they undergo a Character Transformation, becoming Amulet Diamond. Afterward, Diamond returns to her egg until Amu's desires to "shine again", but secretly comes out as a spirit at times. In chapter 38, Diamond finally returns and helps Amu to lift Ikuto's spirit. They then character transform and help Ikuto, She, Ran, Miki, and Su combine powers with Amu becoming Amulet Fortune. In chapter 44, Diamond tells Amu that Ran, Miki and Su have "disappeared" and that she will help Amu find them as her "navigator". Diamond becomes Amu's guide in the Eggs' Cradle in Amu's search for the four colored shards. Coming to terms with herself and the future, Amu accepts the loss of her Guardian Characters and Diamond disappears as well, guaranteeing that the four of them will always be watching over her. In Shugo Chara! Encore, Diamond and the other three have hatched again and catch Amu's thrown bouquet. When Amu Character Changes with Diamond in Shugo Chara! Party's Shugo Chara Dokki Doki, Amu does not really do much but smile and sparkle, disappointing Ran, Miki, and Su. Her theme color is yellow. In the anime television series, Diamond is voiced by Kanae Itō.

=== Tadase Hotori ===
Tadase Hotori (辺里 唯世, Hotori Tadase) is a boy in the same year as Amu and serves as King's Chair of the Guardians. Like Amu, he is actually a shy person and is not good at public speaking; instead, he Character Changes with his Guardian Character, Kiseki. Although he is popular with the girls, when a girl confesses their love to Tadase, he will have Kiseki reject her. However, whenever he hears the word ouji ("prince"), or anything resembling the word ouji, he Character Changes into an egotistical king who seeks world domination. Amu develops a crush on Tadase soon after she transfers to the school. His love interest is Amulet Heart, Amu's Character Transformation with Ran, but it later becomes Amu herself. In episode 39, Kiseki's egg turns into an X Egg because Tadase lost his self-esteem by not being able to find the Embryo. With the help of Amulet Heart, Tadase turns back to normal. Tadase has known Ikuto and Utau since childhood, but he does not talk about it in detail until the Guardians are about to face Utau in their final battle. Amu and Tadase reconcile soon after, though. Later on, he agrees to help Amu save Ikuto from Easter. Tadase confesses his love for Amu in chapter 28 (episode 74 in the anime) behind Amu's house while Ikuto is hiding in Amu's closet. Ikuto overhears and makes fun of Tadase, only to protect him, which he knows nothing about. When Tadase is facing Ikuto in chapter 35, his staff becomes a sword called Royal Sword in episode 99. Tadase ventures into the Eggs' Cradle with Amu, but subsequently gets separated from her because of a meteor shower. The future Tadase, who looks like Tsukasa, helps Amu and reveals himself to be Tadase. In episode 127 of the anime, he kisses Amu on the cheek and tells her that he will always be by her side. In the anime television series, Tadase is voiced by Reiko Takagi. He is portrayed by Hidemi Hikita in the musical.

Kiseki (キセキ)
Kiseki is Tadase's Guardian Character. Kiseki was born for a combination of Tadase's desire to be stronger and the dream of world domination. Because of this, Kiseki is extremely egotistical and often demanding, and does not like obeying others. He frequently calls other Guardian Characters to go on "Special Secret Meetings". A running gag is that the other Guardian Character will almost always ignore him when he starts up a meeting. Kiseki is aware of Tadase's crush on Amu and acts the same way as Amu's Guardian Characters whenever Tadase seems to be confessing to Amu. Kiseki holds a grudge against Ikuto's Guardian Character, Yoru. During Character Change, Tadase gains the confidence to overcome his shyness. However, sometimes Tadase will become an egotistical person who seeks world domination. Although Tadase could not Character Transform with Kiseki at first, they later gain this ability with the help of Amu after Kiseki's egg gets tainted with an X, becoming Platinum Royal. His theme color is gold. In the anime television series, Kiseki is voiced by Kaya Miyake.

=== Ikuto Tsukiyomi ===
Ikuto Tsukiyomi (月詠 イクト, Tsukiyomi Ikuto) is a teenage boy in high school, contracted by Easter to find the Embryo. He often helps Amu even though he works for Easter. Ikuto actually despises Easter and tries to wrench himself free from them by trying to find the Embryo to grant that wish. He possesses the Dumpty Key which pairs with Amu's Humpty Lock which at first did not fit in the keyhole. Like his father, Ikuto is a skilled violinist. He is the current owner of the Dumpty Key, which originally belonged to Aruto, his father, although Tadase's father had it for a little while. His father is presumed to be dead, but Ikuto refuses to believe it and has set out to find him. As her status as the only daughter of the past president of the Easter Company, his mother was forced to marry the company's director after her husband's violin was found in a foreign country. From her second marriage, she bound her children to working for Easter. Ikuto's personality is aloof, mysterious, and a little naughty. He likes teasing people, especially Amu and Tadase. He is also the older brother of Utau Hoshina. As the series goes on, he grows very strong feelings for Amu—he confessed that he loves her in the same chapter Tadase does, although she believes he is teasing her. He later surrenders himself to Easter, not wanting to get anyone else involved in the mess he made. In the manga timeline, it is shown he character transforms with a new black Guardian Egg to become Death Rebel, shocking Amu. In chapter 38, he character transforms with Yoru and the black egg into Seven Seas Treasure. In chapter 39; it is said that Ikuto may have two eggs, one is possibly still inside him. In one of the later chapters, Ikuto calls Amu "princess" and she replies by asking him to thank her for making him get back to normal. Ikuto swears that this time he will be the one to protect her. In chapter 43, Ikuto confesses to Amu he will never see her again as he is going to search for his father. Ikuto returns for Yukari Sanjo and Yuu Nikaidou's wedding. Amu is very happy and relieved to see him. He promises that he will show Amu sides of him that she has not seen, but only when he returns for her when she is older. Later he kisses her on the nose. At the wedding Ikuto and Amu are seen holding hands and Amu says she knows she can reach the future without letting go of his hand. In the anime television series, Ikuto is voiced by Yūichi Nakamura. He is portrayed by KENN in the musical.

Yoru (ヨル)
Yoru is Ikuto's cat-like Guardian Character and represents Ikuto's desire to be free. Yoru often goes out by himself and enjoys causing trouble for the Guardians and their Guardian Characters for fun. When Ikuto and Yoru undergo a Character Transformation, they become Black Lynx. Yoru becomes hysterical when Ikuto does the Death Rebel Character Transformation in chapter 31. During this time, he also cannot track Ikuto because the hypnotizing tuning fork confuses him. Later on, when Amu and Tadase find Ikuto being controlled by Easter, Yoru takes the Dumpty Key and gives it to Amu. In chapter 38 he and the black egg combine powers with Ikuto to become Seven Seas Treasure. In chapter 46, Amu finds a dazed Yoru in the Eggs' Cradle. He and Amu fall out of the Egg's cradle and see Ikuto. In chapter 48, when Yoru sees how happy Ikuto is, he commends him for having become a "true alley cat", and goes back to being a heart's egg inside of Ikuto. His theme color is black. In the anime television series, Yoru is voiced by Miyuki Sawashiro.

=== Utau Hoshina/Tsukiyomi ===
Utau Hoshina (ほしな 歌唄, Hoshina Utau) is a junior high student model turned singing idol. She is actually Ikuto's younger sister, Utau Tsukiyomi (月詠 歌唄, Tsukiyomi Utau). Utau had tried to find the Embryo to release her brother from Easter, but she never succeeded. Utau is very attracted to Ikuto and becomes extremely jealous of Amu because Ikuto shows an interest in her. However, she eventually accepts Amu and they become friends. She becomes good friends with Kukai in the anime and manga, and soon starts a relationship with him.

She was the vocalist of the indie band Black Diamond which is produced by her manager, Yukari Sanjo. They the CDs of their music to draw the eggs out of children and make them into X Eggs. She only sings in Black Diamond whilst in a x-chara change with X-Diamond. X-Diamond is found during one of her x-egg withdrawal sessions. Utau mainly uses X-Diamond to extract other people's heart's egg since X-Diamond can withdraw more x-eggs than Il can; El refuses to do anything. X-Diamond can Character Transform with Utau, and become Dark Jewel, however, the transformation lasts for only a short period of time. When the plan falls apart, Utau quit Easter with her manager and becomes a singer on her own, without Easter contracting her. In the anime television series, Utau is voiced by Nana Mizuki. She is portrayed by Misaki Yonemura in the musical.

Il (イル, Il)
The devilish Iru is the first of Utau's two Character Guardians introduced in the story. Iru seems mean and unkind, but it is just her character. Sometimes she can be helpful and sincere, but she dislikes nagging. She represents Utau's energetic and playful side. During Character Transformation, Utau becomes Lunatic Charm, with the attack Nightmare Lorelei and later, Lilin Trident. When Iru feels lonely because Eru is not there for her to tease, and when she feels that Utau is ignoring her because of Diamond, she Character Transforms with Amu, becoming Amulet Devil. Her theme color is red. In the anime television series, Il is voiced by Hiromi Konno.

El (エル, El)
El is Utau's second Guardian Character and is the complete angelic opposite of Il. She represents Utau's caring and outspoken side towards her brother Ikuto. El often nags, likes correcting people over their choices that she considers wrong herself, and helps those who are troubled by love. Because El was treated badly by Il and ignored by Utau, she left home and wound up in Amu's care. El can perform a Character Transformation with Amu, resulting in Amulet Angel, which surprises Utau. However, as Amu is not El's real owner, the Character Transformation remains powerless with no real abilities. Whenever El performs a Character Transformation with Amu, Amu usually ends up being embarrassed because of El's over-the-top antics. Eru finally performed a Character Transformation with Utau, forming Seraphic Charm. Later in the manga series, Utau uses White Wing to help the Guardians help Ikuto. Her theme color is white. In the anime television series, El is voiced by Hyo-sei.

== Supporting characters ==
Nadeshiko Fujisaki (藤咲 なでしこ, Fujisaki Nadeshiko) / Nagihiko Fujisaki (藤咲 なぎひこ, Fujisaki Nagihiko)
Nadeshiko Fujisaki is a student in the same year as Amu and serves as Queen's Chair of the Guardians. When Amu rejects the offer to join the Guardians, Nadeshiko tries several tactics to convince her to join. The two become best friends and Nadeshiko looks over and supports Amu in her love life. However, before Amu and Nadeshiko enter the sixth grade, Nadeshiko leaves Seiyo Elementary to travel to Europe to study dancing.

Nadeshiko is actually a boy named Nagihiko Fujisaki. Amu and the girls call him by his nickname "Nagi". It is tradition in the Fujisaki family for males to be raised as females as part of their training so that they may play female roles in Japanese dance. Nagihiko's secret is known to his family, Tadase, Kukai, Rima (including their Shugo Chara), and the school's principal Tsukasa Amakawa. Nagihiko has trouble telling Amu that he is actually a boy, instead, he tells Amu that he is Nadeshiko's twin brother. After Kairi leaves the Guardians, Nagihiko returns and is appointed as the interim Jack's Chair. At the of manga, Nagihiko finally confess his secret to. Although Amu greatly shocked about this. In the anime television series, Nadeshiko is voiced by Saeko Chiba. She/he is portrayed by Kanon Fukuda in the musical.

Temari (てまり)
Temari is Nagihiko's first Guardian Character. Temari appears to be elegant and reflects Nagihiko's desire to be more mannered and become a Japanese dancer. However, during Character Change, both Temari and Nagihiko (as Nadeshiko) become aggressive and very masculine; Nagihiko, inadvertently, also gains a naginata, which he promptly uses. Prior to Nagihiko's return to the guardians, Temari went back into her egg to slumber. In chapter 34 and episode 98, Temari wakes up after Nagihiko realizes that it does not matter what gender a person is, it is the effort they put into whatever they do. They perform a Character Transformation, Yamato Maihime's attack is "Robe of Feathers, Dance of the Cherry Blossoms". Her theme color is magenta. In the anime television series, Temari is voiced by Ryōka Yuzuki.

Rhythm (リズム, Rizumu)
Rhythm is Nagihiko's second Guardian Character. Rhythm appears to be cool and outgoing, showing Nagihiko's boyish self. However, he can also be quite a flirt, as is shown when he hugs all of the female guardian charas after just meeting them. Rhythm's egg was first seen in chapter 30 and in episode 56, but as of chapter 34 and episode 91, he hatches after Nagihiko remembers how much he likes playing basketball, at his own pace and rhythm, while fighting against an X Character. During Character Change, huge headphones appear around Nagihiko's neck, and he gains an energetic persona; he also does not seem to hesitate to participate in athletic activities, and goes all out dominating several sports such as soccer, baseball, tennis, and judo. This causes most of the sports clubs to become obsessed with recruiting him for their teams, much to his dismay. When in a Character Transformation, they become Beat Jumper. His theme color is blue. In the anime television series, Rhythm is voiced by Kōki Miyata.

Kukai Soma (相馬 空海, Sōma Kūkai)
Kukai Soma is the upbeat and energetic Jack's Chair of the Guardians. One year senior to Amu, Kukai helps Amu with her training as the Joker. Although he was the captain of the soccer club, Kukai loves and excels at all sports. At the end of the school year, Kukai graduates and goes on to middle school. However, Kukai returns to visit the Guardians from time to time. He also becomes good friends with Utau after they go to a ramen eating contest together. Kukai helps people when they are sad or mad. He helps Amu get along with the new Queen and Jack chair and helps her become a stronger character so she does not bottle up her feelings inside. At the end, he falls in love with Utau. In the anime television series, Kukai is voiced by Atsushi Abe. He is portrayed by Yuta Koseki in the musical.

Daichi (ダイチ)
Kukai's Guardian Character is Daichi. He is very good at sports and cannot seem to sit still. He was born when Kukai wanted to do many sports but had to choose. When Daichi and Kukai Character Change, Kukai becomes even more athletic. When Kukai and Daichi return for a visit, they Character Transform with the power of the Humpty Lock, becoming Sky Jack. His theme color is green. In the anime television series, Daichi is voiced by Hiroyuki Yoshino.

Yaya Yuiki (結木 やや, Yuiki Yaya)
Yaya Yuiki is the childish girl serving as the Ace Chair and is one year junior to Amu. Yaya often acts immature for her age. She has an enormous sweet tooth, a great soft spot for items like ribbons, as well as a tendency to be hyperactive. She is also a ballerina, though a rather clumsy one. She has a newborn baby brother named Tsubasa, who she claims gets all her parents' attention. It is because of this that her baby-like Guardian Character, Pepe, was born. Though she acts jealously around Tsubasa, Yaya does have a responsible side. She once took him by herself to the doctor when he had a fever, as no other option was possible. In the anime television series, Yaya is voiced by Tomoko Nakamura. She is portrayed by Meimi Tamura in the musical.

Pepe (ぺぺ)
Pepe is a baby-like Guardian Character who was born from Yaya's desire to remain baby-like in nature. When either she or Yaya get hurt or something goes wrong, both of them begin to whine and cry in unison. During Character Transformation, they become Dear Baby. Her theme color is pink. In the anime television series, Pepe is voiced by Kimiko Koyama.

Rima Mashiro (真城 りま, Mashiro Rima)
Rima Mashiro replaces Nadeshiko as the new Queen's Chair. Although Rima is the same age as Amu, she is petite and has relatively poor athletic abilities. Most of the boys in her class love her and treat her like a real queen because of her beauty and passive personality, while the girls are annoyed by her because of her selfishness.

Because of a kidnapping incident that happened before she transferred to Seiyo Elementary, her parents pick her up after school. Since it interferes with their work schedules, they often argue about who cares more for Rima over their work. This results in Rima often having no one but Kusukusu as company for her secret interest in gag comedy. Later, she opens up to Amu and becomes friends with her.

When Yaya explains to Rima about Amu and Nadeshiko's friendship, she appears to be jealous. At first, she is shown to have a great dislike for Nagihiko because Amu told Rima and Yaya that he is Nadeshiko's twin brother due to a confusion between the two. This leads Rima to be protective over Amu and cold toward Nagihiko, although it is implied she is in love with him. She tells Nagihiko that he is useless because his Guardian Character is still inside an egg, but she gains respect and trust for him later on. Rima discovers that Nadeshiko and Nagihiko are actually the same person. In the anime television series, Rima is voiced by Sayuri Yahagi. She is portrayed by Karen Yagishita in the musical.

Kusukusu (クスクス)
Kusukusu is Rima's Guardian Character and represents Rima's desire to make others laugh. When she Character Changes, Rima becomes a gag character (which she is embarrassed to use) and uses a signature phrase and pose: "Bala-Balance" (Balancing Balance) from the magazine Great Gag Manga King (ギャグマンガ大王, Gyagu Manga Daiō). During Character Transformation, Rima becomes Clown Drop. Her theme color is crimson. In the anime television series, Kusukusu is voiced by Sayaka Narita.

Kairi Sanjo (三条 海里, Sanjō Kairi)
Kairi Sanjo replaces Kukai as the new Jack's Chair when Kukai leaves for middle school. Kairi is tall, despite being two years younger than Amu. Unlike the spontaneous Kukai, Kairi is uptight, very organized, and blunt about faults. Even with these traits, he is so capable that Amu and Yaya call him "chairman".

Kairi is Yukari Sanjo's younger brother and was sent to spy on the Guardians. This was not his choice though, as Yukari immediately begged him to transfer to Seiyo upon discovering that he had a Guardian Character. Since his sister is busy at work, Kairi takes care of the household work (and his sister) in her apartment. However, when he sees the true meaning of his "missions", he tries to rebel against Yukari, but not before he reveals his secret to the Guardians when they accidentally discover him with teaser CDs. He switches sides after Amu convinces him he is a good person. Afterward, he leaves saying that he promised his parents and local classmates that he would return, but not before declaring his love for Amu, saying that he will return for her when he has become a man worthy of her. He also declared a rivalry toward Tadase. In chapter 44, he is shown in Amu's town looking for Yukari and comments about also looking for "that person". In chapter 45, he becomes an adviser to Yuu Nikaido and Yukari Sanjo, who are arguing about getting back together. In chapter 46, he returns to the academy to meet with Tsukasa, meeting Hikaru and Yaya on his way. In the final chapter of the manga, it is shown that Kairi and Nagihiko share the same love for old samurai movies. In the anime television series, Kairi is voiced by Mitsuki Saiga. He is portrayed by Reo Sawada in the musical.

Musashi (ムサシ)
Kairi's Guardian Character. Musashi has the traits and the personality of a samurai. He also has some of Kairi's traits, such as green hair and glasses. When he Character Transforms with Kairi, they become Samurai Soul. His theme color is teal. In the anime television series, Musashi is voiced by Nobuhiko Okamoto.

Yuu Nikaidou (二階堂 悠, Nikaidō Yū)
Yuu Nikaidou is a former employee member of Easter. In order to find the Embryo, he joins Seiyo Elementary and is in charge of Amu's class in the disguise of a clumsy and kind-hearted teacher. His childhood dream was to become a robot engineer, but when his mentor quit, due to his ailing wife, and his parents opposed the idea, he lost sight of his dream and became a twisted person. He recovers with help from Amu and Su. He resigns from Easter Company and officially becomes the teacher in charge of Amu's class. A running joke is that he calls Amu Hi m amori, meaning "leisure time" much to her dismay. He dated Yukari Sanjo before the series began, and they broke up. In chapter 45, they argue about getting back together. In the anime television series, Yuu Nikaidou is voiced by Junji Majima.

Yukari Sanjo (三条 ゆかり, Sanjō Yukari)
Yukari Sanjo is a former employee of Easter Company, Kairi Sanjo's older sister, and Utau's manager. She comes up with a new project, Black Diamond, to find the Embryo and mass-produce X Eggs. The CDs of the band are freely distributed and the people listening to it had their Eggs removed by force. As the band becomes more famous, their song is slated to be released to the Internet together with the unveiling of the band.

She and Utau resign from Easter after Amu got Diamond back, and start their own record company called Sanjo Productions. Yukari once dated Yuu Nikaidou, but the two have since broken up. She becomes annoyed whenever their former relationship is mentioned. In chapter 45 of the manga, she and Yuu argue about getting back together. In the anime television series, Yukari Sanjo is voiced by Rio Natsuki. She is portrayed by Kumiko Kōgami in the musical.

Lulu de Morcerf Yamamoto (山本 ルル·ド·モルセール, Yamamoto Ruru Do Morusēru)
Lulu De Morcerf is an anime-original character in Shugo Chara!! Doki—. She is the new Easter Company worker who has the ability to turn Heart's Eggs into ? Eggs and has a hobby of making ruby necklace jewelry which she places on her victims. Her mother is an actress and her father is a French chef. She wants to find the Embryo so her mother will regain her radiance and make acting history. At first, Lulu dislikes Amu for always purifying the people with Nazo Tama or "?" Eggs and stopping the Embryo from appearing. However, in episode 63 of Shugo Chara!! Doki—, Lulu becomes much kinder to Amu. In episode 84, Lulu is fired from Easter. However, she continues to seek out the Embryo on her own. When Amu finally finds out that Lulu is the one who has been corrupting people's dreams, she confronts her in a battle. Lulu makes many ? Eggs, so many that they become two giant ? Eggs. She eventually resorts to making her own Guardian Character, Nana, into a ? Egg, and then Character Transforms into Dream Dream. In the end, Amu convinces Lulu to chase her own dreams and not to force her desires on others. After her mother lands a movie role in France, Lulu bids farewell to Amu. In the anime television series, Lulu is voiced by Akemi Kanda.

Nana (ナナ)
Nana is an anime-original character in Shugo Chara!! Doki—. She represents Lulu's desire to be more carefree and less reserved about herself despite her extravagant upbringing. During Character Change, Lulu's hair clip becomes a purple flower. This allows Lulu to use her necklace to corrupt Heart's Eggs. Unlike Lulu's heritage, Nana has a nagoya accent which results in Lulu sometimes speaking in the same dialect, which embarrasses her greatly. When Lulu uses the accent in front of Amu, she compliments it by being cute surprising Lulu. When Amu and the others find out that she and Lulu are the culprits behind the corruptions of Heart's Eggs, Nana confronts their Guardian Characters to convince them of Lulu's intentions. Lulu forcibly turns her into a ? Egg so that she can Character Transform into Dream Dream and fight Amu. She nearly disappears after she is purified, however, Lulu regretfully apologizes to her and she reappears. When Lulu's mother lands a film role in France, she decides to move back to France with Lulu. Her theme color is silver. In the anime television series, Nana is voiced by Ryōka Yuzuki.

Rikka Hiiragi (柊 りっか, Hiiragi Rikka)
Rikka is an anime-original character in Shugo Chara!!! Dokki Doki. She is an upbeat, mysterious girl who can understand what X-Eggs are saying, and she can see Guardian Characters even though she lacks a Heart's Egg. She lives in an apartment room with a bunch of X-Eggs that she collects whenever she sees one. At the end of episode 2, Rikka becomes a Guardian Apprentice after begging Amu and Nagihiko. She becomes quick friends with Hikaru. Later on she finds a yellow egg in her bed with a sun as symbol that eventually hatches into her Guardian Character Hotaru. Because she was ignoring the X-Eggs, panic arose when they started shattering. Saving one of them from shattering triggers her Character Transformation with Hotaru, becoming Pure Feeling. She then helps Amu purify the X-Eggs in her new form. Rikka is appointed the new Queen's Chair before graduation. In the anime television series, Rikka Hiiragi is voiced by Erika.

Hotaru (ほたる)
Hotaru is Rikka's Guardian Character. Rikka gave birth to her egg in Shugo Chara!!! Dokki Doki episode 15. She hatched five episodes later. Before she hatched, Rikka felt lost and subsequently turned her egg into an X-Egg, but it purified very soon. Hotaru is polite and elegant, balancing out Rikka's energy and spunk. The two later perform a Character Transformation when her radiance is awakened, becoming Pure Feeling. Her theme color is orange. In the anime television series, Hotaru is voiced by Ryōka Yuzuki.

Hikaru Ichinomiya (一之宮 ひかる, Ichinomiya Hikaru)
Hikaru Ichinomiya is the head of Easter Company. The people of Easter Company refer to him as "Gozen", although it is revealed that his real name is Hikaru in the later chapters. Gozen promised the company employees a successful career if they can present him the Embryo. According to the manga, he wishes for a rare one-of-a-kind jewel, thus Easter's search for the Embryo. In chapter 40, it is revealed that Gozen is the little boy to whom Amu gave a taiyaki and appeared mysteriously many other times. This little boy, Hikaru, is unique in that he does not have a Heart's Egg in him like almost all children. In chapter 41, after his past is revealed, he finally gains one. It turns out that his egg was actually the shining white egg the others previously suspected was the Embryo. Hikaru is Kazuomi Hoshina's grandson. In chapter 45, he receives a Guardian Egg and transfers to Seiyo Elementary, which also happens in episode 103 of the anime and the Guardians make him a Guardian Apprentice. In the anime television series, Hikaru Ichinomiya is voiced by Eri Nakao. He is voiced by Shōzō Iizuka when using a voice changer.

== Minor characters ==
Midori Hinamori (日奈森 緑, Hinamori Midori)
Midori Hinamori is Amu's mother and works as an editor for the magazine Housewives' Knowledge. Midori is the one responsible for choosing Amu and Ami's clothing styles. Unlike Amu's father, Midori is more understanding of Amu's relationship with boys. In chapter 30, when Amu is found with Ikuto in the house, she believes her and seeks to find a place for Ikuto. In chapter 33, Amu calls her, and Midori mysteriously tells Amu that everyone believes in her. In the anime television series, Midori Hinamori is voiced by Kazusa Murai.

Tsumugu Hinamori (日奈森 紡, Hinamori Tsumugu)
Tsumugu Hinamori is a wild bird photographer and Amu's father. He is devoted to his daughters and refers to them with names like "Papa's little sparrows" and "Papa's shining stars". He is frequently shown taking pictures of Ami. However, he overreacts at the slightest provocation when Amu has a relationship with a boy. In the anime television series, Tsumugu Hinamori is voiced by Yūsei Oda.

Ami Hinamori (日奈森 亜実, Hinamori Ami)
Ami Hinamori is Amu's little sister who is innocent and pure-hearted. Ami is able to see Guardian Characters despite the fact that she does not have one. Unlike Amu, Ami is dressed in "Sweet Lolita" clothing. She respects and looks up to both Utau and Amu and loves to sing. She is a huge fan of Utau and plays a big role in helping her rediscover her good side. In the anime television series, Ami Hinamori is voiced by Kurumi Mamiya.

Tsukasa Amakawa (天河 司, Amakawa Tsukasa)
Tsukasa Amakawa is the first King's Chair of the Guardians and their founder. He is the Seiyo Elementary superintendent and manages the planetarium as a part-time job. He is the author of the book Kokoro no Tamago (The Heart's Egg). Tsukasa looks like Tadase because he is Tadase's uncle on his mother's side. In chapter 32, Tsukasa is seen in a photograph along with the Hotori family and the Tsukiyomi family. So when Ikuto runs away, Tsukasa takes him in and apparently "kidnapped" him in Tadase's eyes. At first, he is thought to hold the Humpty Lock. He is a cat lover and has a liking for Ikuto's cat ears, often teasing him with catnip and food. In chapter 37, Tsukasa mysteriously tells Ikuto "he is not a grown up man". Tsukasa also has a cunning ability to guess people's thoughts. In the anime television series, Tsukasa Amakawa is voiced by Akira Ishida.

Kazuomi Hoshina (星名 一臣, Hoshina Kazuomi)
Kazuomi Hoshina is the director of Easter company, a middle-aged man who is also Ikuto and Utau's stepfather, and the former superior of Nikaidou and Yukari. After his repeated failure to obtain the Embryo, he starts fearing that Gozen may abandon him, so he forms a plan to brainwash Ikuto to collect X Eggs. In chapter 33, he realizes that the Embryo only shows up when X Eggs are purified, so he lures the Guardians into a trap. In chapter 41, it is revealed that Kazuomi is actually Hikaru's grandfather and he had previously lost his son and wife in a terrible accident. It is also revealed that he forced Souko, Ikuto and Utau's mother, into remarrying him so that his grandson can be his successor at the Easter Company instead of Ikuto. In chapter 42, he asks Ikuto and Souko for forgiveness and decides to retire from Easter. When he gives the divorce papers to Souko, Souko gives him a paper which, after reading it, shocks him. It is later revealed during a conversation between Ikuto and Souko that she never submitted the divorce papers from Aruto, Ikuto's real father in the first place. Ikuto refers to him as "Mr. Director". In the anime television series, Kazuomi Hoshina is voiced by Mitsuru Ogata.

Nobuko Saeki (冴木 のぶ子, Saeki Nobuko)
Nobuko Saeki is a spiritual fortune teller and has a praised fortune telling column in Housewives' Knowledge, although she dislikes the occult. She is 54 and likes miso peanuts. Her spiritual sense is so strong that she is able to see the Guardian Characters. She is the one who inspires Amu to wish to be a new person. In Chapter 33, she appears to help the Guardians into the Easter headquarters, saying that Amu is searching for someone precious to her. She is also fond of Tadase, probably because he looks so much like Tsukasa, who is one of the astrologers in her magazine. In the anime television series, Nobuko Saeki is voiced by Keiko Yamamoto.

Saaya Yamabuki (山吹 沙綾, Yamabuki Saaya)
Saaya Yamabuki is an egotistical girl in the same class as Amu and leader of the Tadase Fan Club. Along with the other club members, Saaya shows off whenever she gets the chance to impress Tadase, and Kukai, but to no avail. She is also very jealous of Amu. Because of that, she once transformed with her hearts' egg (which changed into a ? egg) in Doki! into Hinamori Dream. In the anime television series, Saaya Yamabuki is voiced by Miyuki Kawashō.

Seiichiro Suzuki (鈴木 誠一郎, Suzuki Seiichirō)
Seiichiro Suzuki is a third grade boy who greatly admires Amu. He is often seen cheering for Amu, admiring her in some way, or proving to Saaya Yamabuki that Amu is a superhero or can save anyone from anything. In the anime television series, Suzuki is voiced by Omi Minami.
