= Suki yo, Junjō Hankōki =

"Suki yo, Junjō Hankōki."
- Regular Edition cover

Single by S/mileage

from the album 2 Smile Sensation
- B-side: "Kimi wa Jitensha Watashi wa Densha de Kitaku"
- Released: August 22, 2012 (Japan)
- Genre: J-pop
- Label: Hachama
- Songwriter: Tsunku
- Producer: Tsunku

S/mileage singles chronology
"Dot Bikini" (2012)	"Suki yo, Junjō Hankōki." (2012)	"Samui ne" (2012)

Music video
- "Suki yo, Junjō Hankōki" on YouTube

Professional ratings
Review scores
Source	Rating
Billboard Japan	Favorable

"Suki yo, Junjō Hankōki." (好きよ、純情反抗期。) is the 11th major single (15th counting the indies) by the Japanese girl idol group S/mileage, released in Japan on August 22, 2012.

== Background ==
The single was released in four versions: Limited Edition A, Limited Edition B, Limited Edition C, Limited Edition D, and Regular Edition. Each edition has a different cover. The limited editions A, B, and C include a bonus DVD with a different version of the music video for the title track. All the limited editions are shipped sealed and include a serial-numbered entry card for the lottery to win a ticket to one of the single's launch events.

The B-side is a cover of the hit song "Kimi wa Jitensha Watashi wa Densha de Kitaku" by Cute. Cute released it as a CD single four months prior, in April 2012. The version by S/mileage is used as a theme song in Kaidan Shin Mimibukuro Igyō, a movie starring S/mileage members that came out on August 11.

== Track listing ==
All tracks are written by Tsunku.

CD
No.	Title	Length
1.	"Suki yo, Junjō Hankōki" (好きよ、純情反抗期。)
2.	"Kimi wa Jitensha Watashi wa Densha de Kitaku" (君は自転車 私は電車で帰宅, cover of a hit by Cute)
3.	"Suki yo, Junjō Hankōki (Instrumental)" (好きよ、純情反抗期。（Instrumental）)

Limited Edition A DVD
No.	Title	Length
1.	"Suki yo, Junjō Hankōki (Dance Shot Ver.)" (（Dance Shot Ver.）)

Limited Edition B DVD
No.	Title	Length
1.	"Suki yo, Junjō Hankōki (Black Ver.)" (（Black Ver.）)

Limited Edition C DVD
No.	Title	Length
1.	"Suki yo, Junjō Hankōki (Dance Shot Ver. II)" (（Dance Shot Ver.II）)

=== Bonus ===
Sealed into all the limited editions

- Event ticket lottery card with a serial number

== Charts ==
Chart (2012)	Peak position
Oricon Daily Singles Chart	6
Oricon Weekly Singles Chart	7
Oricon Monthly Singles Chart	28
Billboard Japan Hot 100	37
Billboard Japan Hot Singles Sales	9

== DVD single ==
The corresponding DVD single (so called Single V) was released a week later, on August 29.

=== Track listing ===
DVD
No.	Title	Length
1.	"Suki yo, Junjō Hankōki (Music Video)" (好きよ、純情反抗期。（Music Video）)
2.	"Suki yo, Junjō Hankōki (Close-up Ver.)" (好きよ、純情反抗期。（Close-up Ver.）)
3.	"Making Eizō" (メイキング映像） "Making-of video")
