= 2 Smile Sensation =

Studio album by S/mileage
- Released: May 22, 2013 (JP)
- Genre: J-pop
- Label: Hachama
- Producer: Tsunku

S/mileage chronology
S/mileage Best Album Kanzenban 1 (2012)	2 Smile Sensation (2013)	S/mileage / Angerme Selection Album "Taiki Bansei" (2015)

Singles from 2 Smile Sensation
- 1. "Suki yo, Junjō Hankōki." Released: August 22, 2012; 2. "Samui ne." Released: November 28, 2012; 3. "Tabidachi no Haru ga Kita" Released: March 20, 2013

2 Smile Sensation (②スマイルセンセーション) is the second studio album by Japanese girl idol group S/mileage. It was released on 22 May 2013 on the label Hachama.

== Release ==
The album was released in 2 versions: a regular edition and a limited edition. The limited edition contained an additional DVD.

The album contained 10 tracks on the CD: 3 songs that were originally released as A-sides of 3 physical singles and 7 new songs.

== Chart performance ==
The album debuted at number 13 in the Japanese Oricon weekly albums chart.

== Personnel ==
Members of S/mileage:

- Ayaka Wada
- Kanon Fukuda
- Kana Nakanishi
- Akari Takeuchi
- Rina Katsuta
- Meimi Tamura

== Track listing ==
All tracks are written by Tsunku

CD (same in all editions)
No.	Title	Length
1.	"Shin Nihon no Susume!" (新・日本のすすめ！)
2.	"Tabidachi no Haru ga Kita" (旅立ちの春が来た)
3.	"Otona no Tochû" (大人の途中)
4.	"Tenshinranman" (天真爛漫)
5.	"Suki yo, Junjō Hankōki." (好きよ、純情反抗期。)
6.	"Watashi no Kokoro" (私の心)
7.	"Yūgure Koi no Jikan" (夕暮れ 恋の時間)
8.	"Nē Senpai" (ねぇ 先輩)
9.	"Sayonara Sayonara Sayonara" (さよなら さよなら さよなら)
10.	"Samui ne." (寒いね。)

DVD (comes with the Limited Edition only)
No.	Title	Length
1.	"Samui ne. (Close-up Ver. II)" (寒いね。（Close-up Ver.II）)
2.	"Tabidachi no Haru ga Kita (Another Ver.)" (旅立ちの春が来た（Another Ver.）)
3.	"Tabidachi no Haru ga Kita (Dance Shot Ver. II)" (旅立ちの春が来た（Dance Shot Ver.II）)
4.	"Yûgure Koi no Jikan (Wada Ayaka Solo Ver.)" (夕暮れ 恋の時間（和田彩花Solo Ver.）)
5.	"Yûgure Koi no Jikan (Fukuda Kanon Solo Ver.)" (夕暮れ 恋の時間（福田花音Solo Ver.）)
6.	"Yûgure Koi no Jikan (Nakanishi Kana Solo Ver.)" (夕暮れ 恋の時間（中西香菜Solo Ver.）)
7.	"Yûgure Koi no Jikan (Takeuchi Akari Solo Ver.)" (夕暮れ 恋の時間（竹内朱莉Solo Ver.）)
8.	"Yûgure Koi no Jikan (Katsuta Rina Solo Ver.)" (夕暮れ 恋の時間（勝田里奈Solo Ver.）)
9.	"Yûgure Koi no Jikan (Tamura Meimi Solo Ver.)" (夕暮れ 恋の時間（田村芽実Solo Ver.）)
10.	"Album Making Eizō" (アルバムメイキング映像)

== Charts ==
Chart (2013)	Peak position
Japan (Oricon Weekly Albums Chart)	13
