= Tabidachi no Haru ga Kita =

- Regular Edition cover

Single by S/mileage

from the album 2 Smile Sensation
- B-side: "Dōshiyō"
- Released: March 20, 2013 (Japan)
- Genre: J-pop
- Label: Hachama
- Songwriter: Tsunku
- Producer: Tsunku

S/mileage singles chronology
"Samui ne" (2012)	"Tabidachi no Haru ga Kita" (2013)	"Atarashii Watashi ni Nare! / Yattaruchan" (2013)

Music video
- "Tabidachi no Haru ga Kita" on YouTube

Professional ratings
Review scores
Source	Rating
Billboard Japan	Favorable

"Tabidachi no Haru ga Kita" (旅立ちの春が来た; "Spring of Departure Has Come") is the 13th major single (17th counting the indies) by the Japanese idol group S/mileage, released in Japan on March 20, 2013.

== Background ==
The single will be released in four versions: Limited Edition A, Limited Edition B, Limited Edition C, Limited Edition D, and Regular Edition. The limited editions A, B, and C will include a bonus DVD with a different version of the music video for the title track. All the limited editions will be shipped sealed and will include a serial-numbered entry card for the lottery to win a ticket to one of the single's launch events. Each edition has a different cover.

There is no DVD single (containing the music video for the title song) scheduled for release this time.

== Chart performance ==
It is the first S/mileage single to chart at number 1 on the Oricon Daily Chart.

== Track listing ==
All tracks are written by Tsunku.

CD
No.	Title	Length
1.	"Tabidachi no Haru ga Kita" (旅立ちの春が来た)
2.	"Dōshiyō" (どうしよう)
3.	"Tabidachi no Haru ga Kita (Instrumental)" (旅立ちの春が来た（Instrumental）)

Limited Edition A DVD
No.	Title	Length
1.	Untitled (Titles to be announced)

Limited Edition B DVD
No.	Title	Length
1.	Untitled (Titles to be announced)

Limited Edition C DVD
No.	Title	Length
1.	Untitled (Titles to be announced)

=== Bonus ===
Sealed into all the limited editions

- Event ticket lottery card with a serial number

== Charts ==
Chart (2013)	Peak position
Oricon Daily Singles Chart	1
Oricon Weekly Singles Chart	4
Oricon Monthly Singles Chart	28
