= Samui ne =

"Samui ne."
- Regular Edition cover

Single by S/mileage

from the album 2 Smile Sensation
- B-side: "Watashi, Choito Kawaii Urabanchō"
- Released: November 28, 2012 (Japan)
- Genre: J-pop
- Label: Hachama
- Songwriter: Tsunku
- Producer: Tsunku

S/mileage singles chronology
"Suki yo, Junjō Hankōki" (2012)	"Samui ne." (2012)	"Tabidachi no Haru ga Kita" (2013)

Music video
- "Samui ne" on YouTube

Professional ratings
Review scores
Source	Rating
Billboard Japan	Favorable

"Samui ne." (寒いね。; "It's Cold, Isn't It?") is the 12th major single (16th counting the indies) by the Japanese idol group S/mileage, released in Japan on November 28, 2012.

== Background ==
The song was premiered live at the concert held on September 29 at Yokohama Blitz.

The single was released in four versions: Limited Edition A, Limited Edition B, Limited Edition C, Limited Edition D, and Regular Edition. Each edition has a different cover. All the limited editions are shipped sealed and include a serial-numbered entry card for the lottery to win a ticket to one of the single's launch events. The limited editions A, B, and C include a bonus DVD with a different version of the music video for the title track.

== Track listing ==
All tracks are written by Tsunku.

CD
No.	Title	Length
1.	"Samui ne" (寒いね。)
2.	"Watashi, Choito Kawaii Urabanchō" (私、ちょいとかわいい裏番長)
3.	"Samui ne (Instrumental)" (寒いね。（Instrumental）)

Limited Edition A DVD
No.	Title	Length
1.	"Samui ne (Yuki ni Negai o Ver.)" (寒いね。（雪に願いを。Ver.）)

Limited Edition B DVD
No.	Title	Length
1.	"Samui ne (Group Shot Ver.)" (寒いね。（Group Shot Ver.）)

Limited Edition C DVD
No.	Title	Length
1.	"Samui ne (Group Shot Ver. II)" (寒いね。（Group Shot Ver. II）)

=== Bonus ===
Sealed into all the limited editions

- Event ticket lottery card with a serial number

== Charts ==
Chart (2012)	Peak position
Oricon Daily Singles Chart	4
Oricon Weekly Singles Chart	6
Oricon Monthly Singles Chart	27
Billboard Japan Hot 100	25
Billboard Japan Hot 100 Airplay	92
Billboard Japan Hot Singles Sales	9

== DVD single ==
The corresponding DVD single (so called Single V) was released a week later, on December 5.

=== Track listing ===
DVD
No.	Title	Length
1.	"Samui ne" (寒いね。)
2.	"Samui ne (Close-up Ver.)" (寒いね。（Close-up Ver.）)
3.	"Making Eizō" (メイキング映像） "Making-of video")
