= List of J-pop artists =

This is a list of J-pop artists and groups. Originally an evolution of jazz, and coined New Music, the style went on to become known as City Pop, music with an urban theme. Later called Japan-made Pop, the term was shortened to J-pop and now encompasses a wide range of musical styles and genres. J-pop represents modern pop culture music originating from the country or musical talent of Japan.

== –9 ==
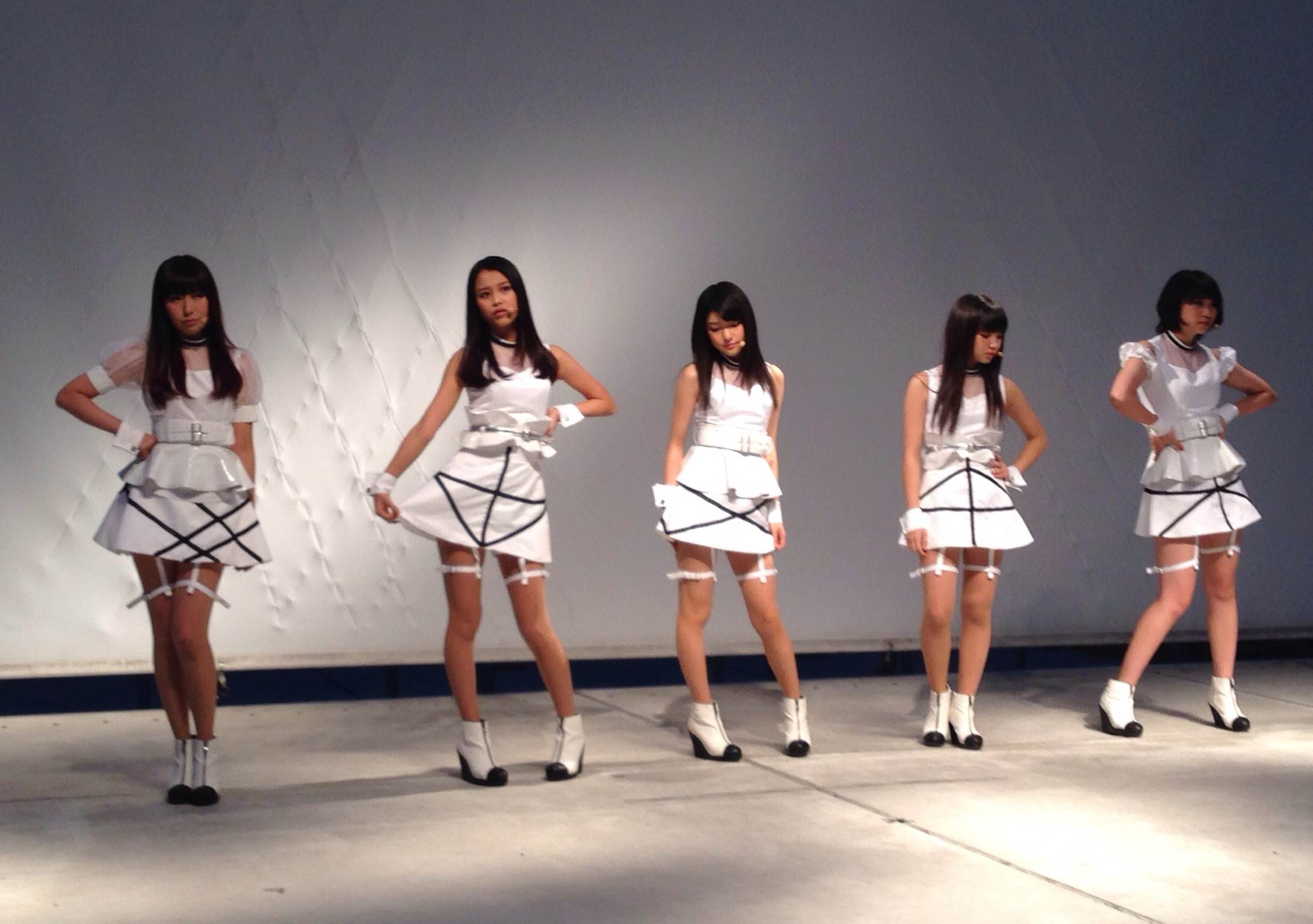
9nine at a promotional event, November 2013

- °C-ute
- 10,000 Promises.
- 175R
- 19
- 22/7
- 2BACKKA
- 2o Love to Sweet Bullet
- 3B LAB.☆
- 9nine
- &TEAM
- @onefive

== A ==
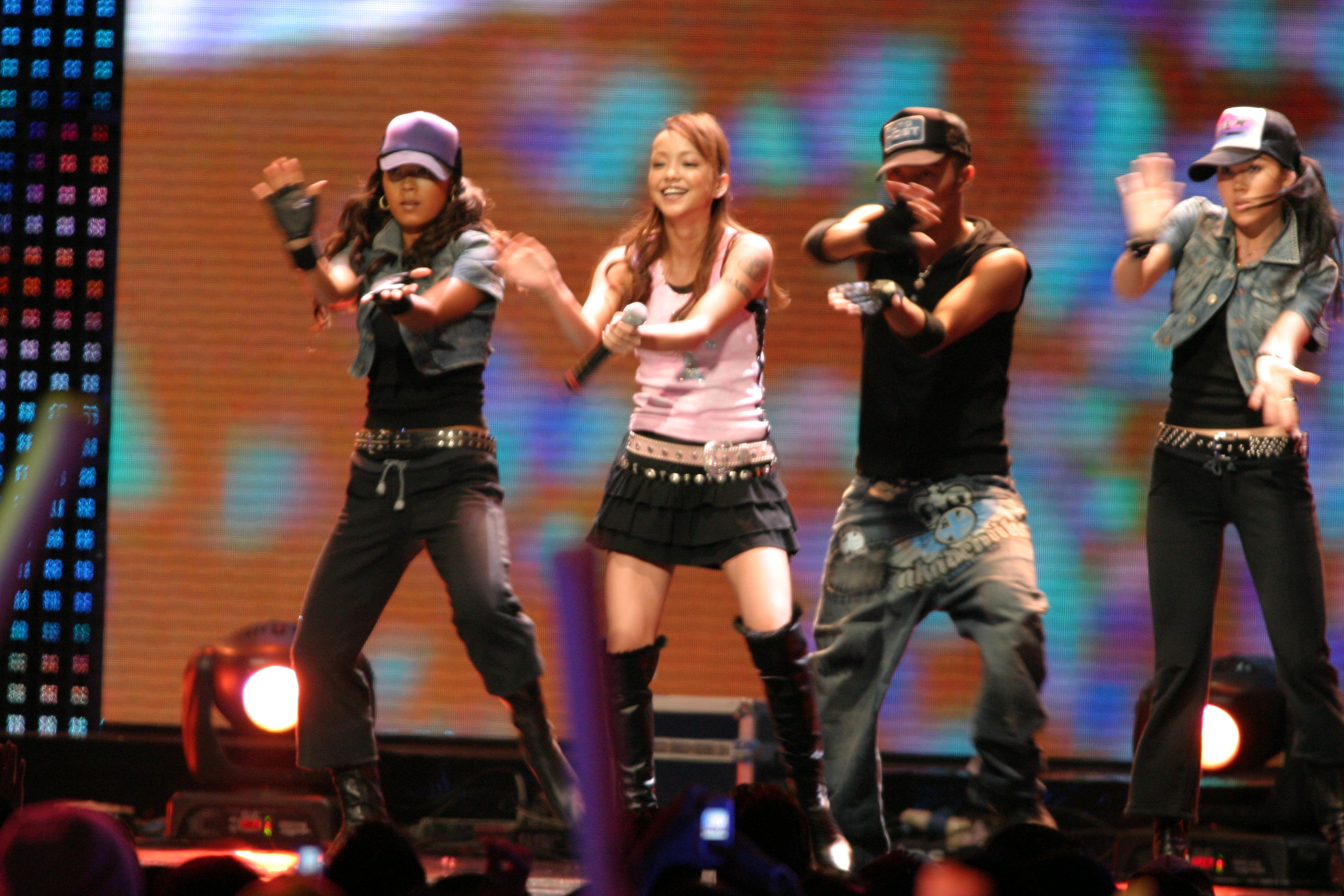
Namie Amuro performing at MTV Asia Aid, Bangkok, Thailand, 2005

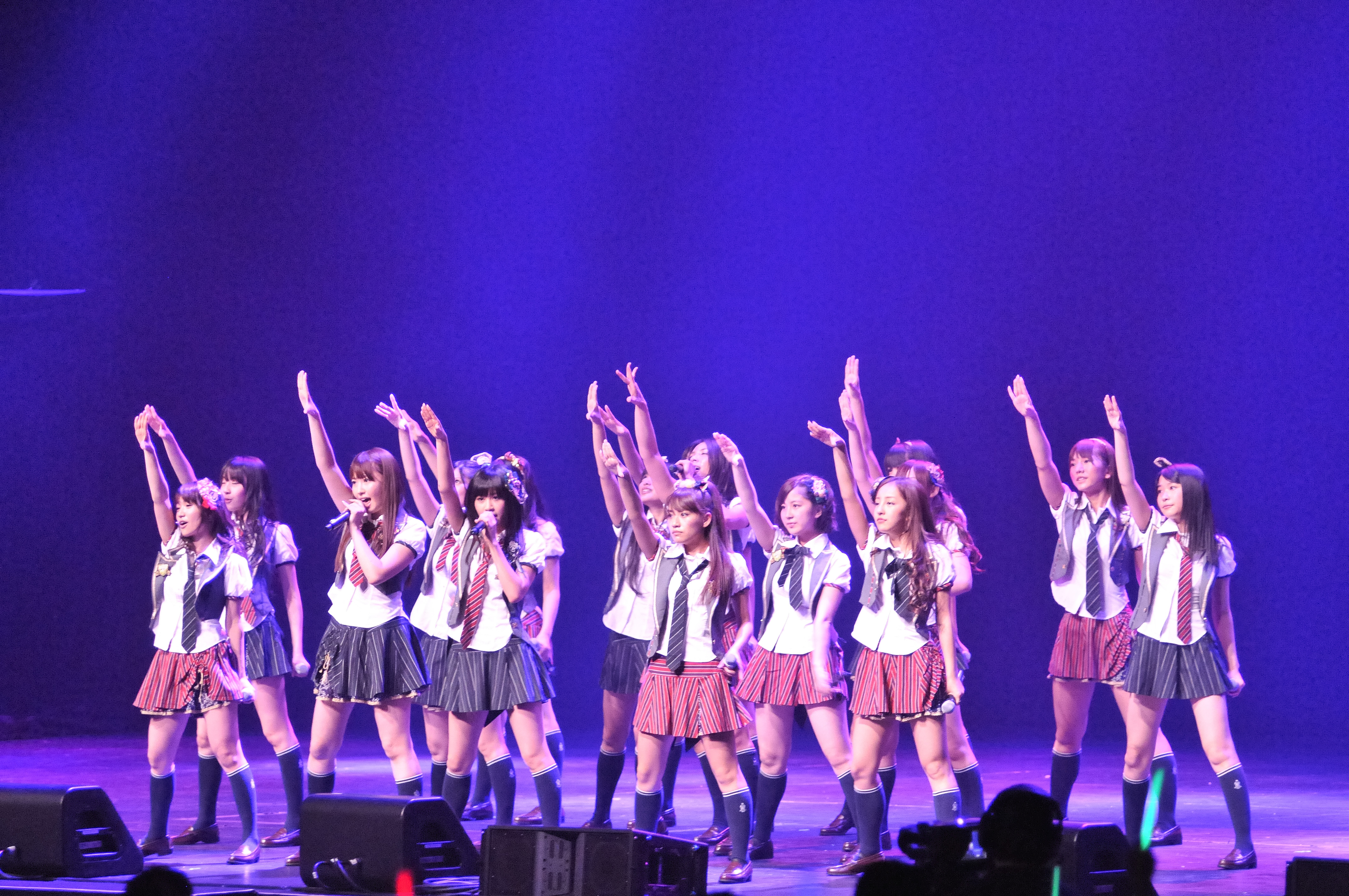
AKB48 has won several awards in Japanese popular music.

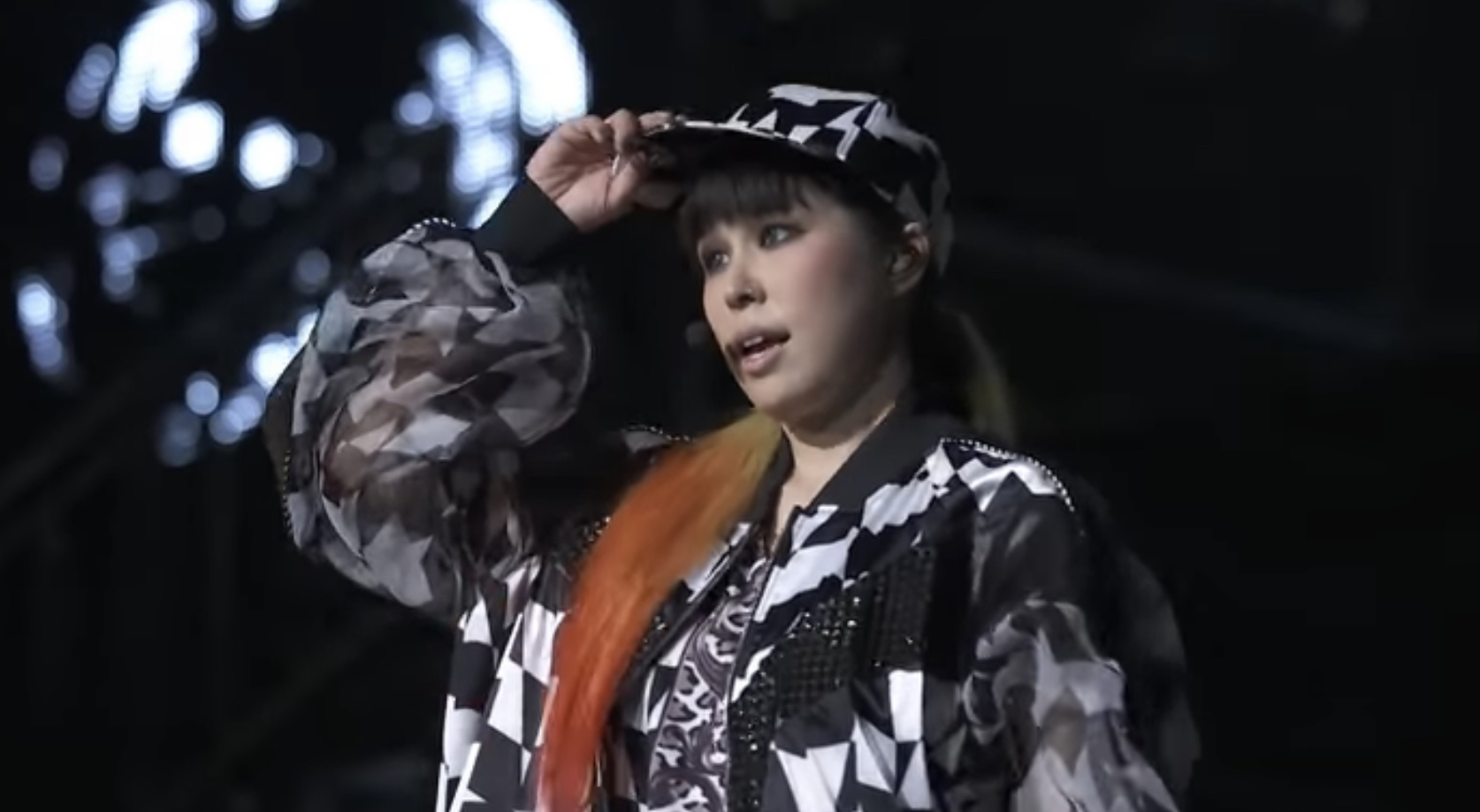
Japanese-American singer Ai's single "Story" was the sixth single in history to receive a triple million digital certification from the Recording Industry Association of Japan.

- Aa!
- AAA
- Abe, Mao
- Abe, Natsumi
- Abe, Ryohai
- Abe, Yasuhiro
- Abe, Yoshiharu
- Access
- Acid Black Cherry
- Aco
- Ado
- Ai
- Aiba, Masaki
- Aida, Shoko
- Aikawa, Hiroki
- Aikawa, Nanase
- Aiko
- Aimer
- Aimyon
- Air
- Aira, Mitsuki
- Aiso, Haruhi
- Aiuchi, Rina
- Ajico
- Akanishi, Jin
- Akashi, Momoka
- AKB48
- Akeboshi
- Akishibu Project
- Aki, Angela
- Akiyama, Satoko
- Alan
- [Alexandros]
- The Alfee
- Ali Project
- Alma Kaminiito
- Ami Suzuki
- Amiaya
- Amuro, Namie
- Anai, Yuko
- Angela
- Angerme
- Anly
- Anna S
- Anzenchitai
- Aoen
- Aonishi, Takashi
- Aoyama, Thelma
- Appare!
- Aqours
- Aqua Timez
- Aragaki, Yui
- Arashi
- Arashiro, Beni
- Arioka, Daiki
- Asakura, Daisuke
- Asaoka, Megumi
- Asian Kung-Fu Generation
- Atarashii Gakko!
- Ayabie
- Ayaka
- Ayana
- AZU

== B ==
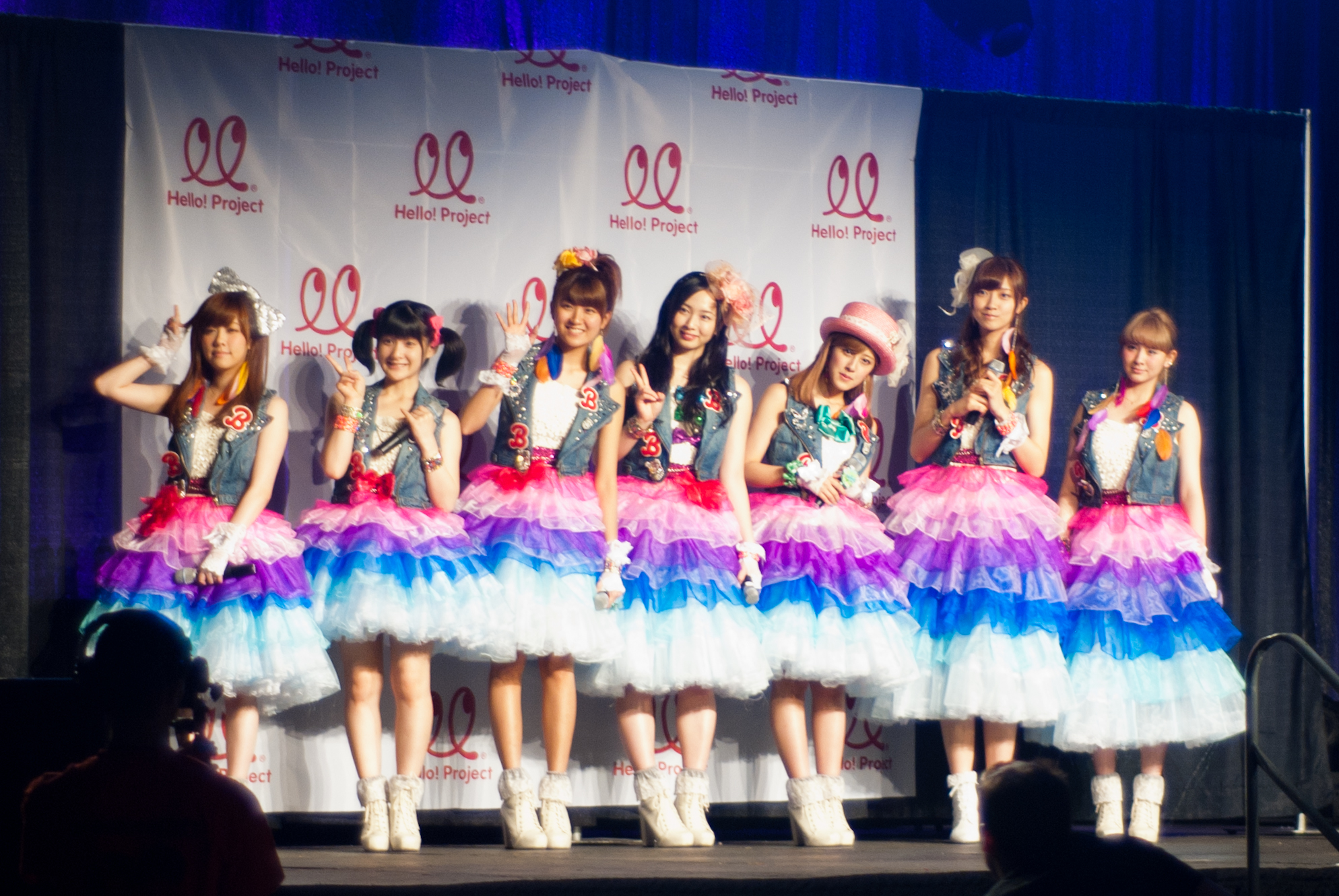
Berryz Kobo was formed in 2004 and is the most stable group of Hello! Project, with only one senior member.

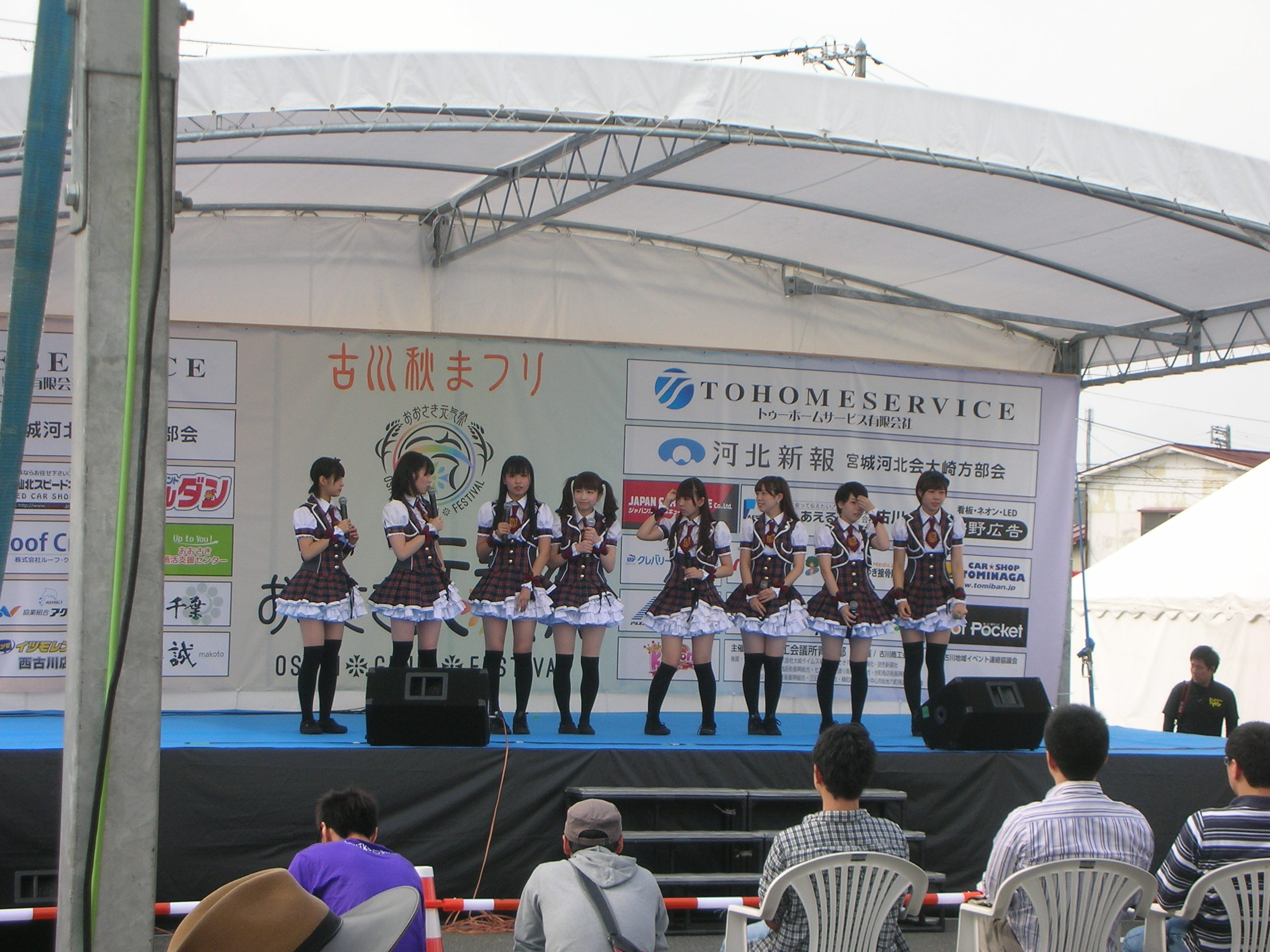
Bakusute Sotokanda Icchome, an idol girl group established in December 2011

- B'z
- Babamania
- BaBe
- Babymetal
- Back-On
- Back Number
- Bakusute Sotokanda Icchome
- Banzai Japan
- Base Ball Bear
- BE:FIRST
- BeForU
- Bennie K
- Berryz Koubou
- Beyooooonds
- Bi-ray
- Bis
- Bish
- Bite a Shock
- Bluem of Youth
- BoA
- Bon-Bon Blanco
- Bonnie Pink
- Boys and Men
- Bright
- The Brilliant Green
- Bullet Train
- bump.y
- Bump of Chicken
- Buono!
- Buzy

== C ==
°C-ute, female Japanese pop group within the Hello! Project

- Candies
- Candy Go!Go!
- Candy Tune
- Capsule
- Carry Loose
- CHAGE and ASKA
- Chara
- Charcoal Filter
- Chatmonchy
- Chemistry
- Che'Nelle
- Cheeky Parade
- Chiba, Saeko
- Chihara, Minori
- Chinen, Rina
- Chinen, Yuri
- Chu-Z
- The Cinderella Project
- ClariS
- Clear's
- Coconuts Musume
- College Cosmos
- Cool Joke
- CooRie
- Core of Soul
- Cosmosy
- Country Musume
- Crystal Kay
- Cutie Street
- CY8ER
- CYNHN

== D ==
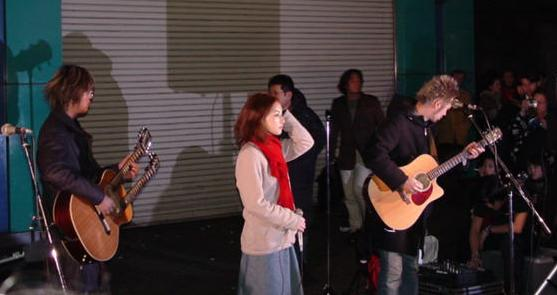
Do As Infinity during a "street live", c. 2000

- D-51
- D&D
- D DATE
- Da-iCE
- Da Pump
- The Dance for Philosophy
- DAOKO
- Danceroid
- Dancing Dolls
- Naniwa Danshi
- Day After Tomorrow
- Dear Kiss
- Deen
- Dempagumi.inc
- DEPAPEPE
- Devil Anthem.
- Dicot
- Dish
- Diva
- Dizon, Leah
- DJ Ozma
- Do As Infinity
- Dohzi-T
- Dōmoto, Kōichi
- Dōmoto, Tsuyoshi
- Dream
- Dream Morning Musume
- Dreams Come True
- DRM

== E ==
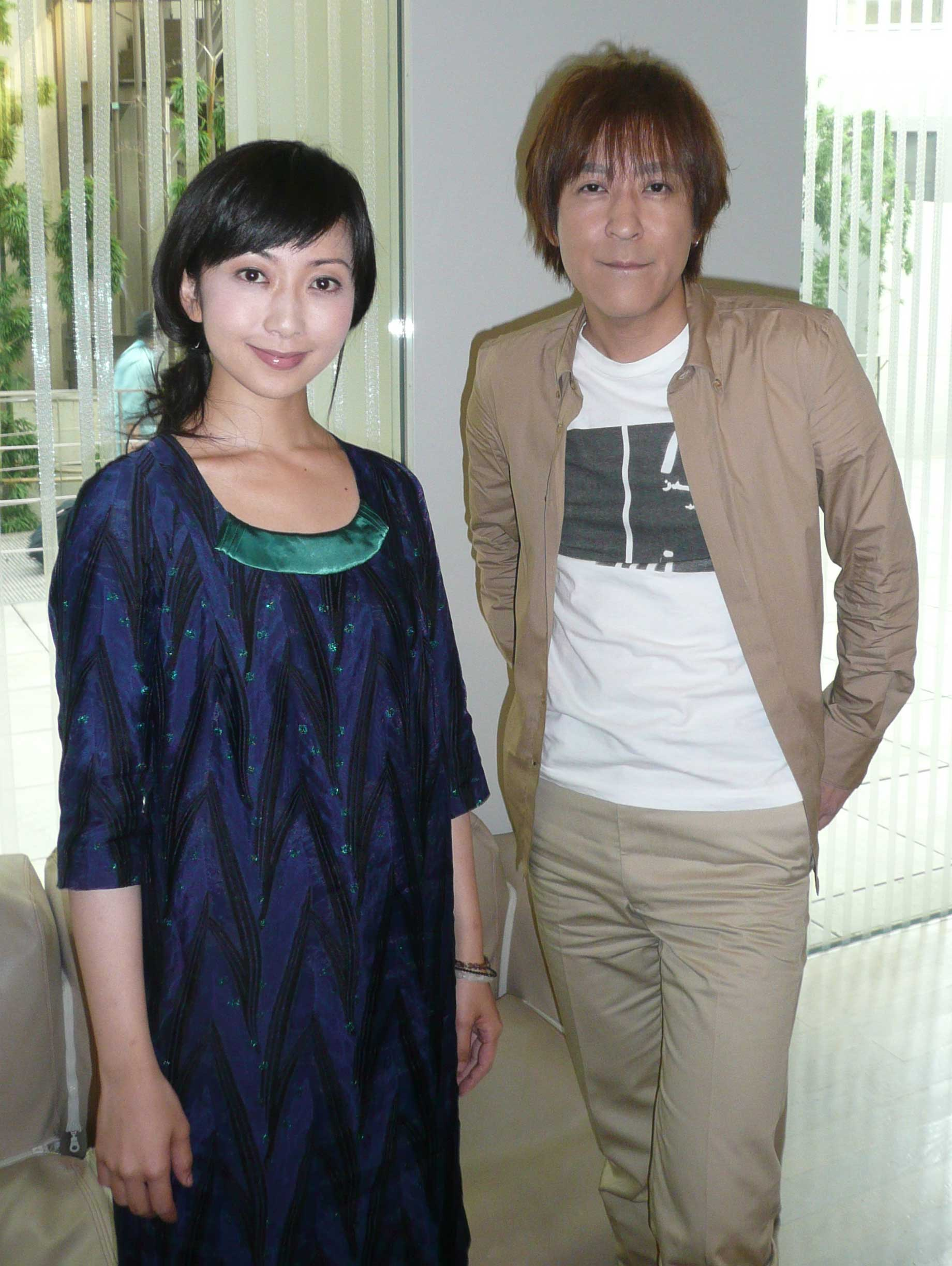
Every Little Thing, popular Japanese band

- E-girls
- E.mu
- Earth
- Ebichu
- Eightranger
- Eito
- Elisa
- Empire
- Emyli
- Eto, Rie
- Etsuko Yakushimaru
- Eu Phoria
- Eve (Japanese singer)
- Every Little Thing
- EXILE

== F ==
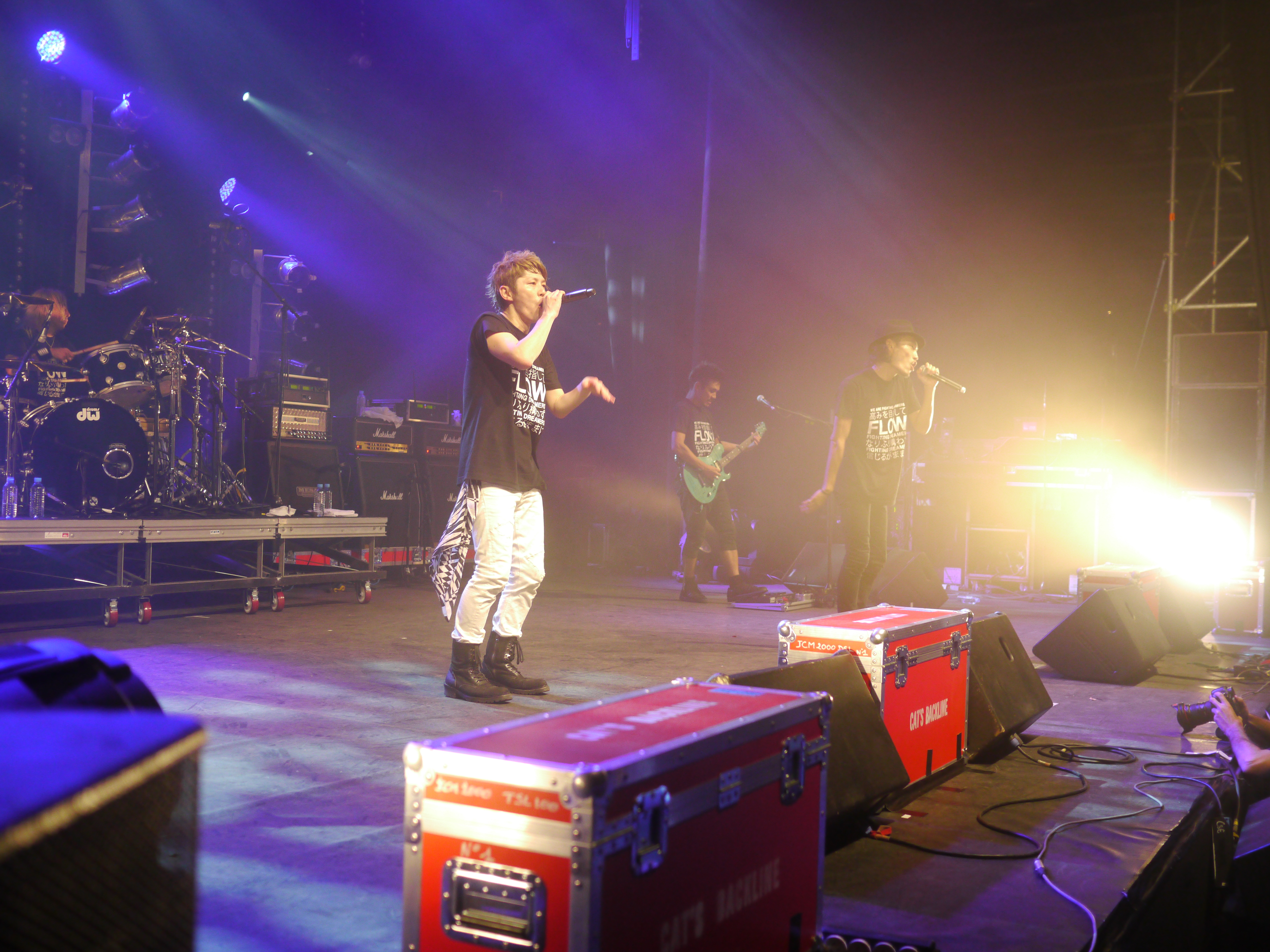
FLOW, pop and rock band formed in 1998

f5ve, a hyperpop group formed in 2022 as SG5

- Fairies
- Faky
- Favorite Blue
- Faylan
- Fayray
- Fear, and Loathing in Las Vegas
- Festive
- f5ve
- FictionJunction Yuuka
- Field of View
- Flap Girls' School
- Flipper's Guitar
- FLOW
- flumpool
- Folder 5
- Four Leaves
- French Kiss
- fripSide
- Fruits Zipper
- Fu, Rie
- Fujii Kaze
- Fujii, Fumiya
- Fukada, Kyoko
- Fukuda, Saki
- Fukusaki, Eric
- Fukuyama, Masaharu
- Funky Monkey Babys
- Furukawa, Yūta

== G ==
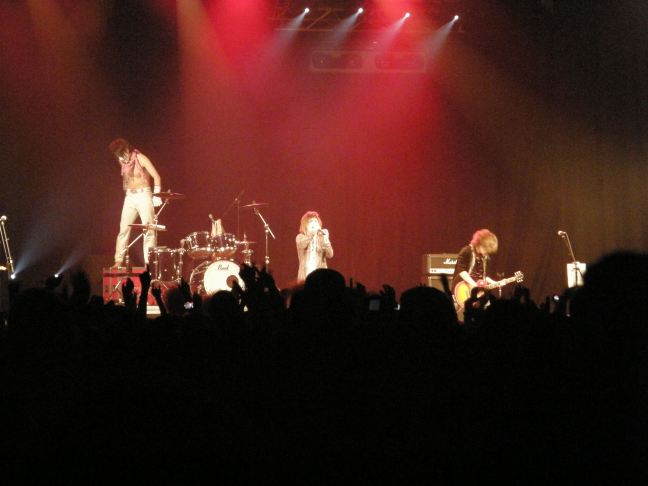
Golden Bomber, band that won one of the first places in the national Oricon chart

- Gackt
- Gang Parade
- Garnet Crow
- Generations from Exile Tribe
- Girl Next Door
- Glay
- Globe
- Go-Bang's
- Godiego
- Golden Bomber
- Goto, Maki
- Go to the Beds
- GReeeeN
- Guardians 4

== H ==
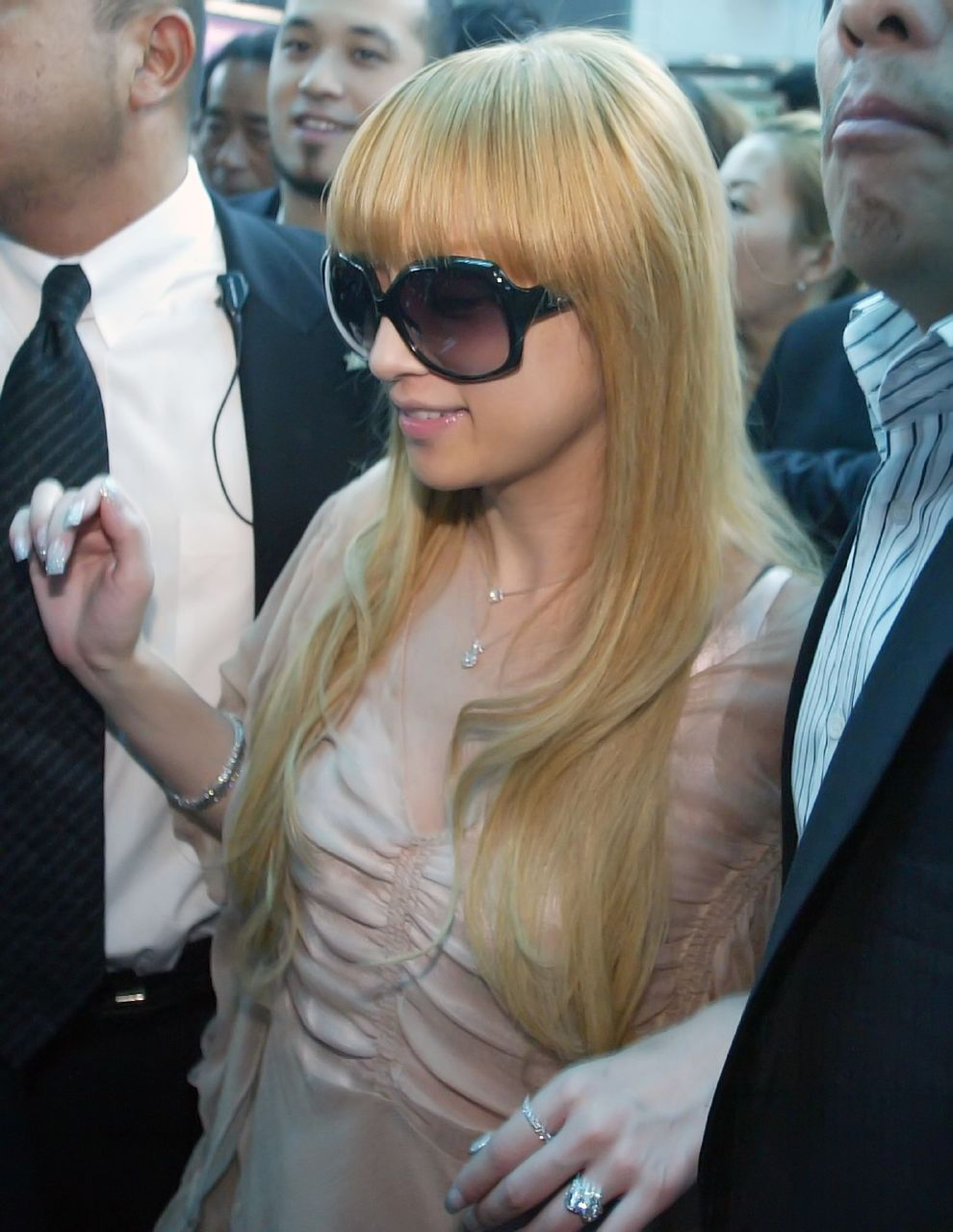
Ayumi Hamasaki, also called Ayu by her fans

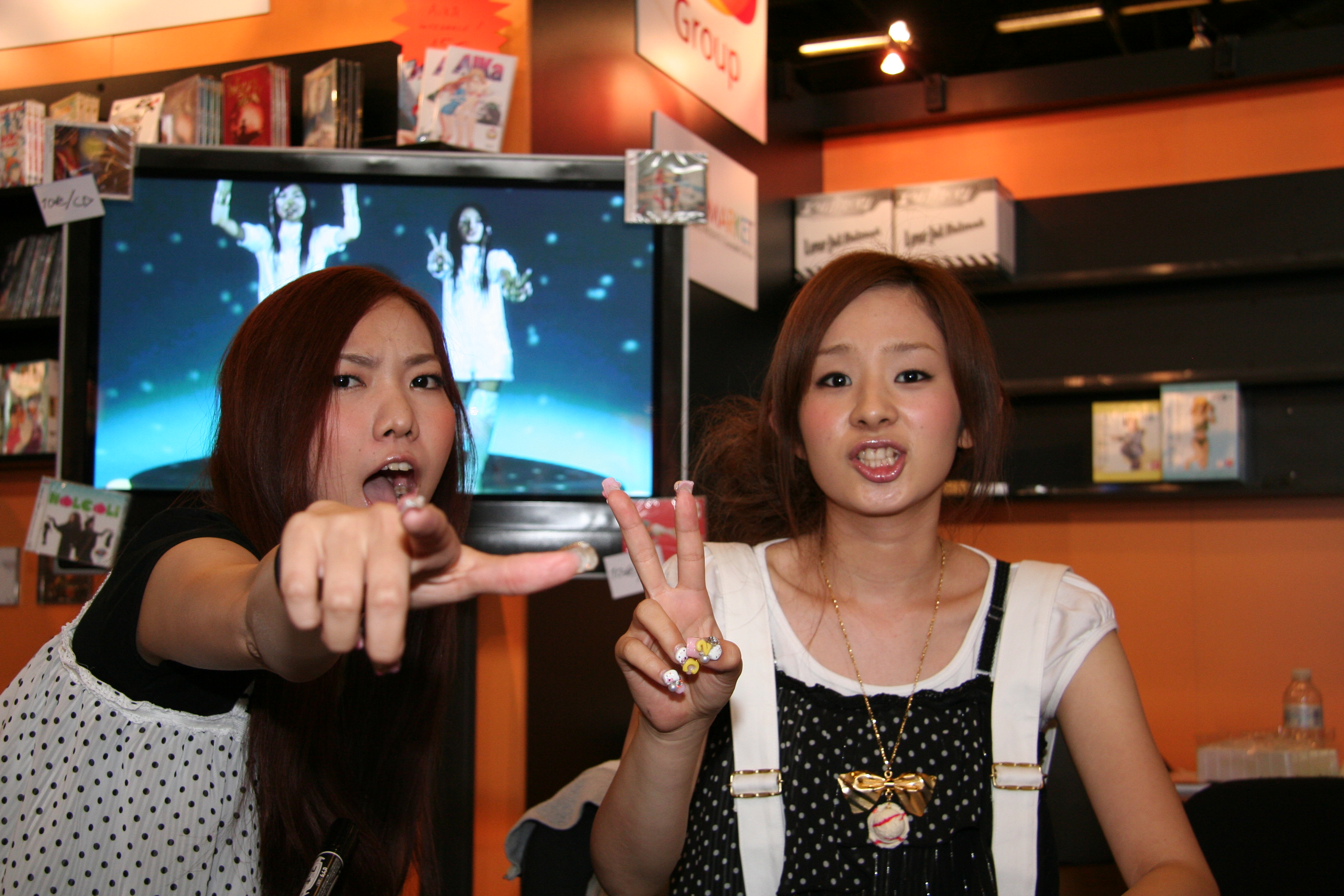
Halca (left) and Yucali of HALCALI making hand gestures at Japan Expo, 2007

- H-wonder
- Hajime, Chitose
- Hal
- HALCALI
- Hamada, Mari
- Hamasaki, Ayumi
- Hana
- Hanazawa, Kana
- hANGRY&ANGRY
- Yuko Hara
- Harada, Shinji
- Haruna, Luna
- Hata, Motohiro
- Hatsune Miku
- Hayashi, Asuca
- Hayashi, Nobutoshi
- Hayashibara, Megumi
- Hearts Grow
- Heartsdales
- Hello! Project All Stars
- Hey! Say! JUMP
- High-King
- Hikashu
- Himeka
- Hinatazaka46
- Ken Hirai
- Hinoi, Asuka
- Hinoi Team
- Hinouchi, Emi
- Hirahara, Ayaka
- Hirai, Ken
- Hirano, Aya
- Hirose, Kōmi
- Hisakawa, Aya
- Hitomi
- Hitoto, Yō
- HKT48
- Hōkago Princess
- Ho-kago Tea Time
- Home Made Kazoku
- Honda, Minako
- Horie, Mitsuko
- Horie, Yui
- Hoshimura, Mai
- Gen Hoshino
- Hotch Potchi
- HY
- Hysteric Blue

== I ==
- I WiSH
- Ice Creamusume
- Iceman
- Ichii, Sayaka
- Idol College
- Idol Renaissance
- Idoling!!!
- Iijima, Mari
- Iizuka, Mayumi
- Ikeda, Ayako
- Ikimonogakari
- Imai, Miki
- Inaba, Koshi
- The Indigo
- Indigo la End
- INI
- Inoo, Kei
- Inoue, Kazuhiko
- Inoue, Kikuko
- Inuwasi
- Irino, Miyu
- Ishida, Yoko
- Ishii, Tatsuya
- Ishikawa, Chiaki
- Ishikawa, Rika
- Isoya, Yuki
- Itano, Tomomi
- Itō, Yuna
- Iwata, Sayuri
- i☆Ris
- Iz*One

== J ==
- J Soul Brothers
- JAM Project
- Janne Da Arc
- Jasmine
- Jay'ed
- Jero
- JO1
- Johnny's West
- Judy and Mary
- Juice=Juice
- JUJU
- June
- Jungle Smile
- Jyongri
- Jyukai

== K ==
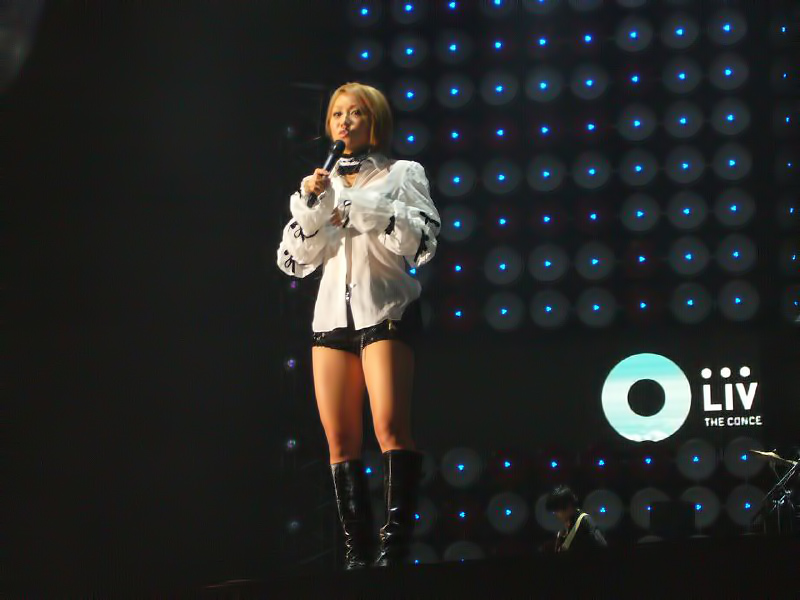
Koda Kumi performing at the Tokyo leg of Live Earth

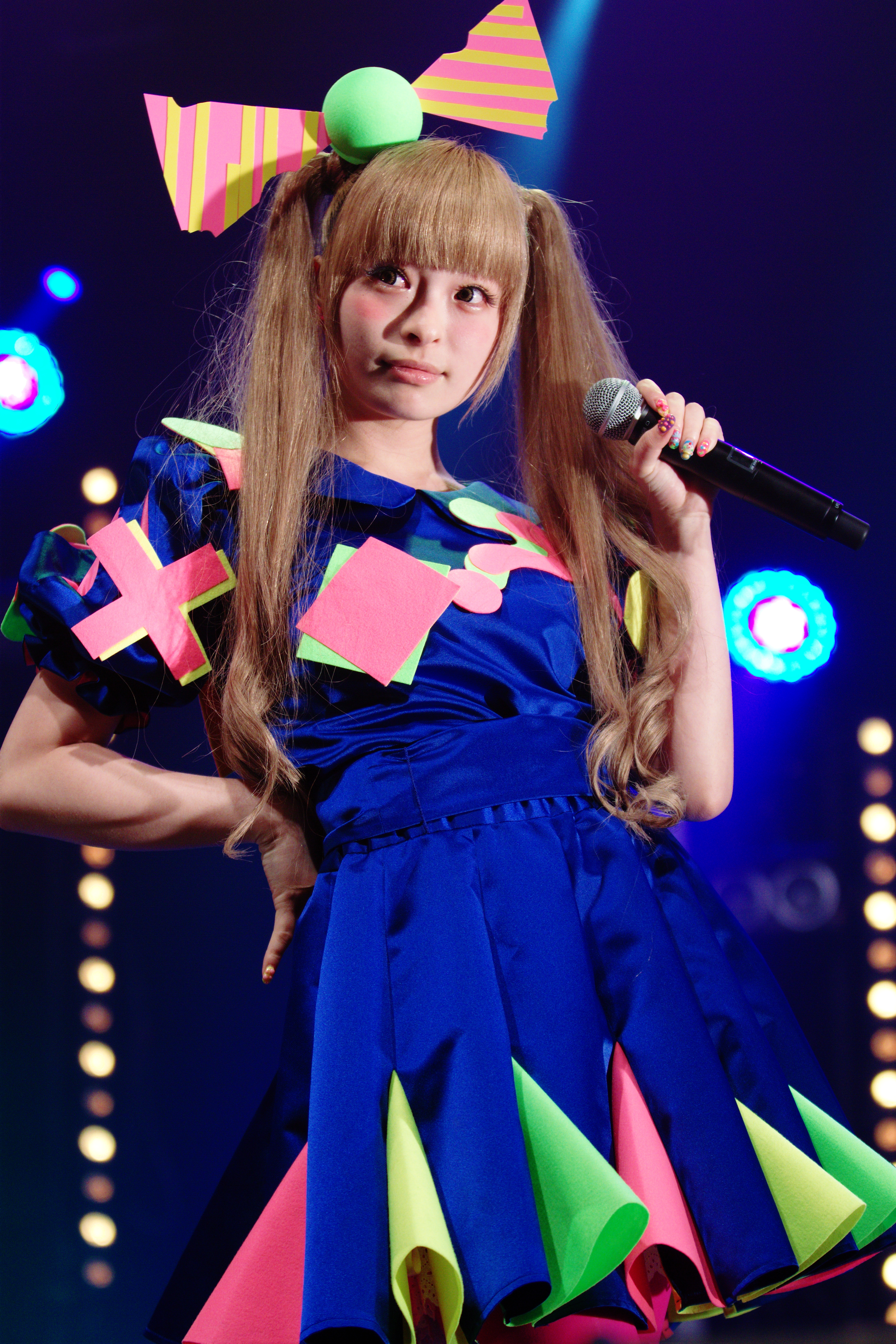
Kyary Pamyu Pamyu is today one of the most popular singers of the genre.

- K
- Kageyama, Hironobu
- Kahala, Tomomi
- Kahimi Karie
- kalafina
- Kaji, Meiko
- Kame to Yamapi
- Kamiki, Aya
- Kamiyado
- Kanjani Eight
- Kazuya Kamenashi
- Kanno, Yoko
- KAT-TUN
- Katakiri, Rekka
- Kato, Miliyah
- Kawabe, Chieko
- Kawada, Mami
- Kawase, Tomoko
- Kawashima, Ai
- Kawasumi, Ayako
- Kayo, Aiko
- Ketsumeishi
- Keyakizaka46
- Kick the Can Crew
- Kids Alive
- Kikkawa, Kōji
- kitaro
- Kimeru
- Kimura, Kaela
- King Gnu
- King & Prince
- KinKi Kids
- Kotani, Kinya
- Kirinji
- Kitaro
- Kis-my-ft2
- Kishimoto, Hayami
- Kitade, Nana
- Kiyokiba Shunsuke
- Kiyotaka Sugiyama
- Kobukuro
- Kōda, Kumi
- Kōda, Mariko
- Kokia
- Kolme
- Komatsu, Miho
- Kome Kome Club
- Kosaka, Riyu
- KOTOKO
- Koyanagi, Yuki
- Kudo, Shizuka
- Kubota, Saki
- Kumaki, Anri
- Kuraki, Mai
- Kuroki, Meisa
- Kushida, Akira
- Kusumi, Koharu
- Kuwata, Keisuke
- Kyary Pamyu Pamyu

== L ==
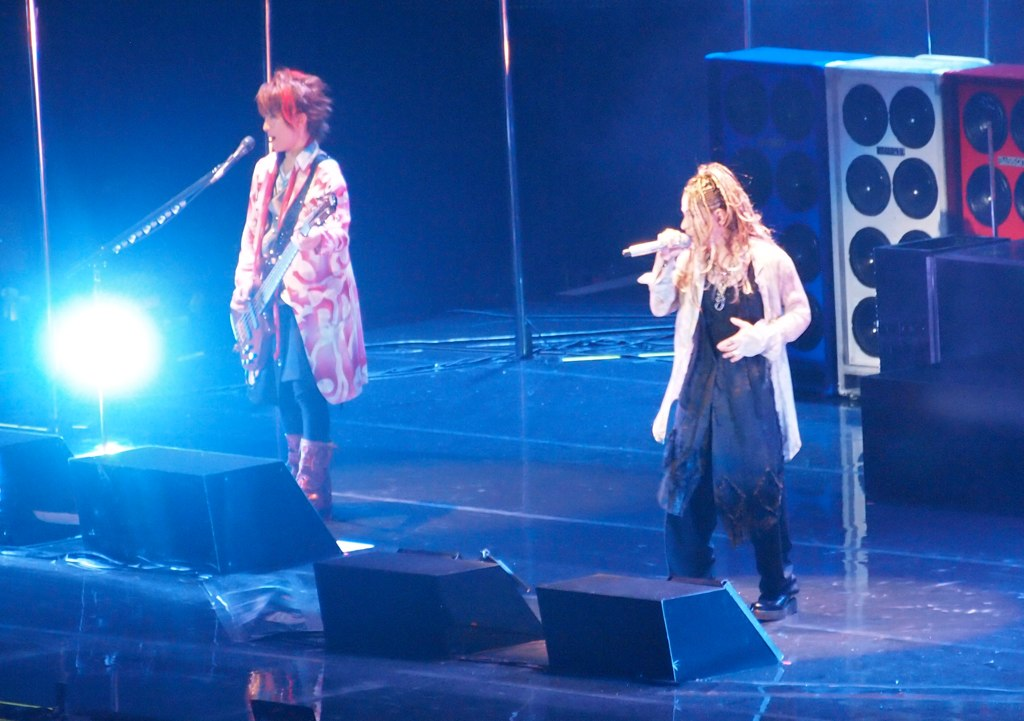
L'Arc-en-Ciel, a popular rock and J-pop band, active since 1991, consisting of four members

- L'Arc-en-Ciel
- Ladybaby
- Last Idol
- Lead
- Leo Ieiri
- Lia
- Lindberg
- Ling Tosite Sigure
- LiSA (Japanese musician, born 1987)
- Little by Little
- Little Glee Monster
- LM.C
- Love
- Love Psychedelico
- Lufkin, Olivia
- =Love

== M ==
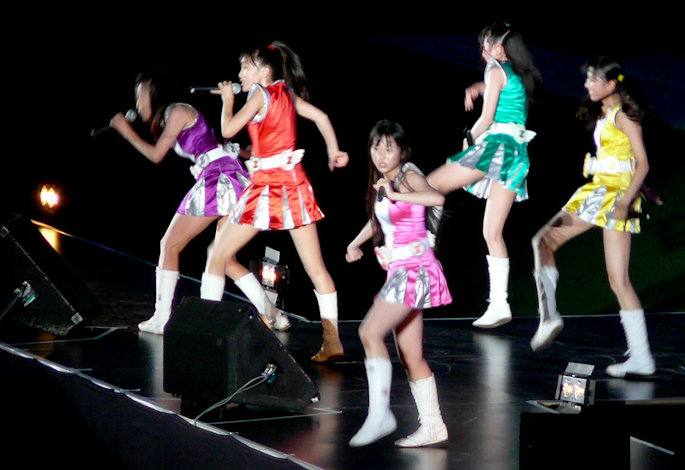
Momoiro Clover Z is ranked as the most popular female idol group according to 2013–2015 surveys.

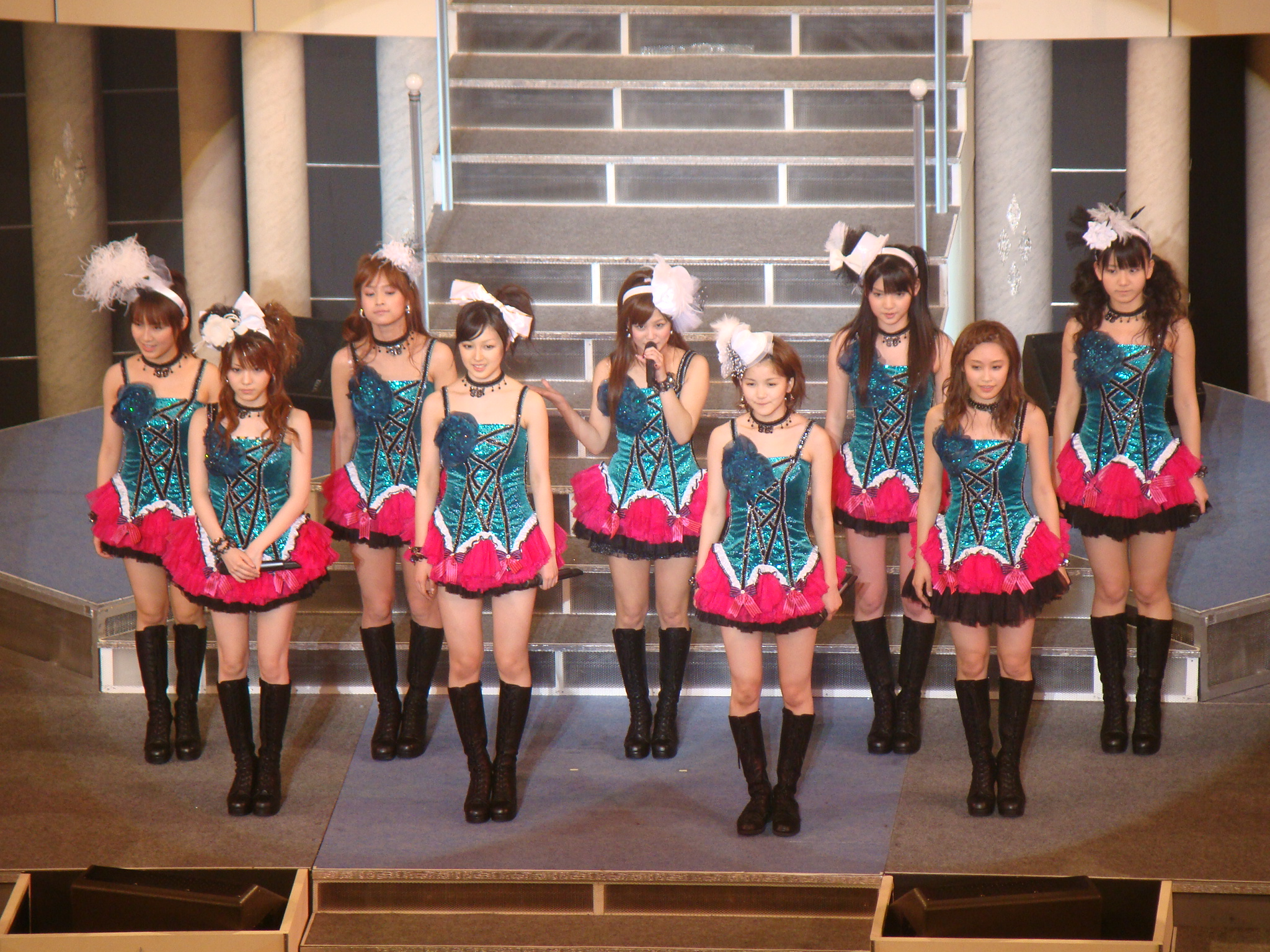
Morning Musume is the longest running female idol group that holds the record for most consecutive top 10 singles for any Japanese artist.

- M-Flo
- Maeda, Ai
- Maeda, Atsuko
- Maeda, Yuki
- Magnolia Factory
- Mai
- Maison Book Girl
- Makihara, Noriyuki
- Makino, Yui
- Mameshiba no Taigun
- Mano, Erina
- marble
- The Margarines
- Masuda, Keiko
- Masuda, Yuri
- Matsu, Takako
- Matsuda, Seiko
- Matsui, Jurina
- Matsui, Rena
- Matsumoto, Jun
- Matsushita, Yuya
- Matsutoya, Yumi
- Matsuura, Aya
- Mawatari, Matsuko
- MAX
- May J.
- May'n
- Mell
- Mellow Mellow
- Melocure
- melody.
- Melon Kinenbi
- Metis
- MiChi
- Mie
- mihimaru GT
- Nana Mizuki
- MilkyWay
- MINAMI
- Minawo
- Minekawa, Takako
- Mini Moni
- Mink
- Minmi
- MIQ
- Misato, Aki
- Misia
- misono
- Miura, Daichi
- Miyano, Mamoru
- Miyavi
- Miyazaki, Ayumi
- Shinji Miyazaki
- Miz
- Mizca
- Mizuki, Nana
- Momoi, Haruko
- MONGOL800
- MONKEY MAJIK
- Moriguchi, Hiroko
- Morikawa, Miho
- Moritaka, Chisato
- Moriyama, Naotarō
- Momoiro Clover Z
- Monkey Majik
- Morning Musume
- Motohiro Hata
- moumoon
- m.o.v.e
- Mr. Children
- Mrs. Green Apple
- Myco
- My Little Lover

== N ==
- Nakagawa, Shōko
- Nakahara, Mai
- Nakajima, Miyuki
- Nakajima, Yuto
- Nakamori, Akina
- Nakanishi, Toshio
- Nakashima, Mika
- Nakayama, Miho
- Nakayama, Uri
- Nakayama, Yuma
- Nano
- Natori
- Natsukawa, Rimi
- Nemuri, Haru
- Neo Japonism
- NEWS
- Matsuri Nine
- Ninomiya, Kazunari
- Nishikawa, Takanori
- Nishino, Kana
- NiziU
- NGT48
- NMB48
- no3b
- Nobodyknows+
- Nogizaka46
- Nomiya, Maki
- Not yet
- NYC
- N Zero
- NCT Wish

== O ==
- Oda, Kazumasa
- Odani, Misako
- Official Hige Dandism
- Ogata, Megumi
- Ogura, Kei
- Ohguro, Maki
- Ohno, Satoshi
- Okada, Yukiko
- Okamoto, Keito
- Okazaki, Ritsuko
- Okuda, Tamio
- Okui, Masami
- Onitsuka, Chihiro
- Ono, Erena
- Ono, Lisa
- On/Off
- OnePixcel
- Orange Pekoe
- ORANGE RANGE
- Oshima, Hanako
- Oshima, Yuko
- Oshio, Kotaro
- Otsuka, Ai
- Ozaki, Ami
- Ozaki, Yutaka
- Ozawa, Kenji

== P ==
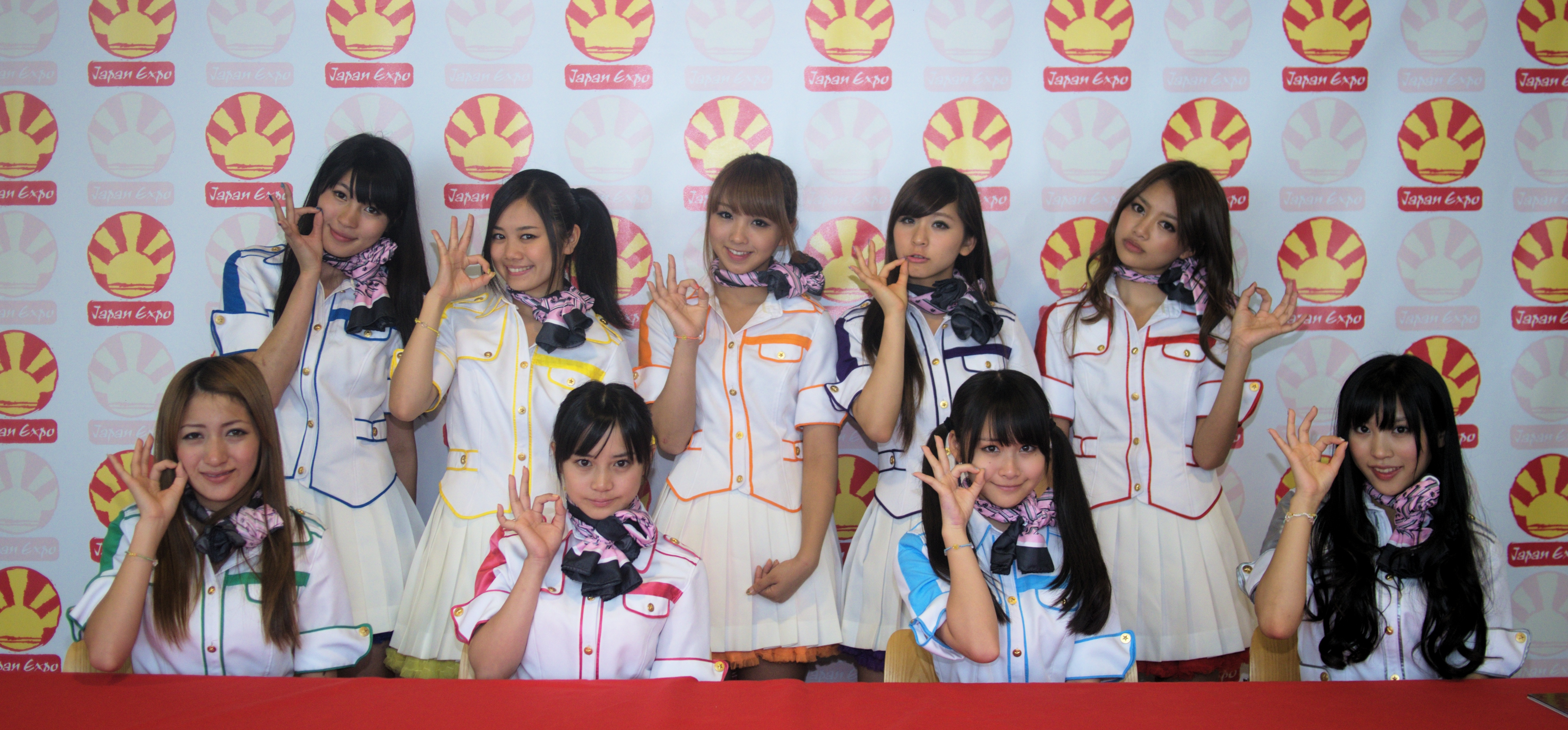
Passpo is a Japanese idol pop girl group under the Platinum Passport.

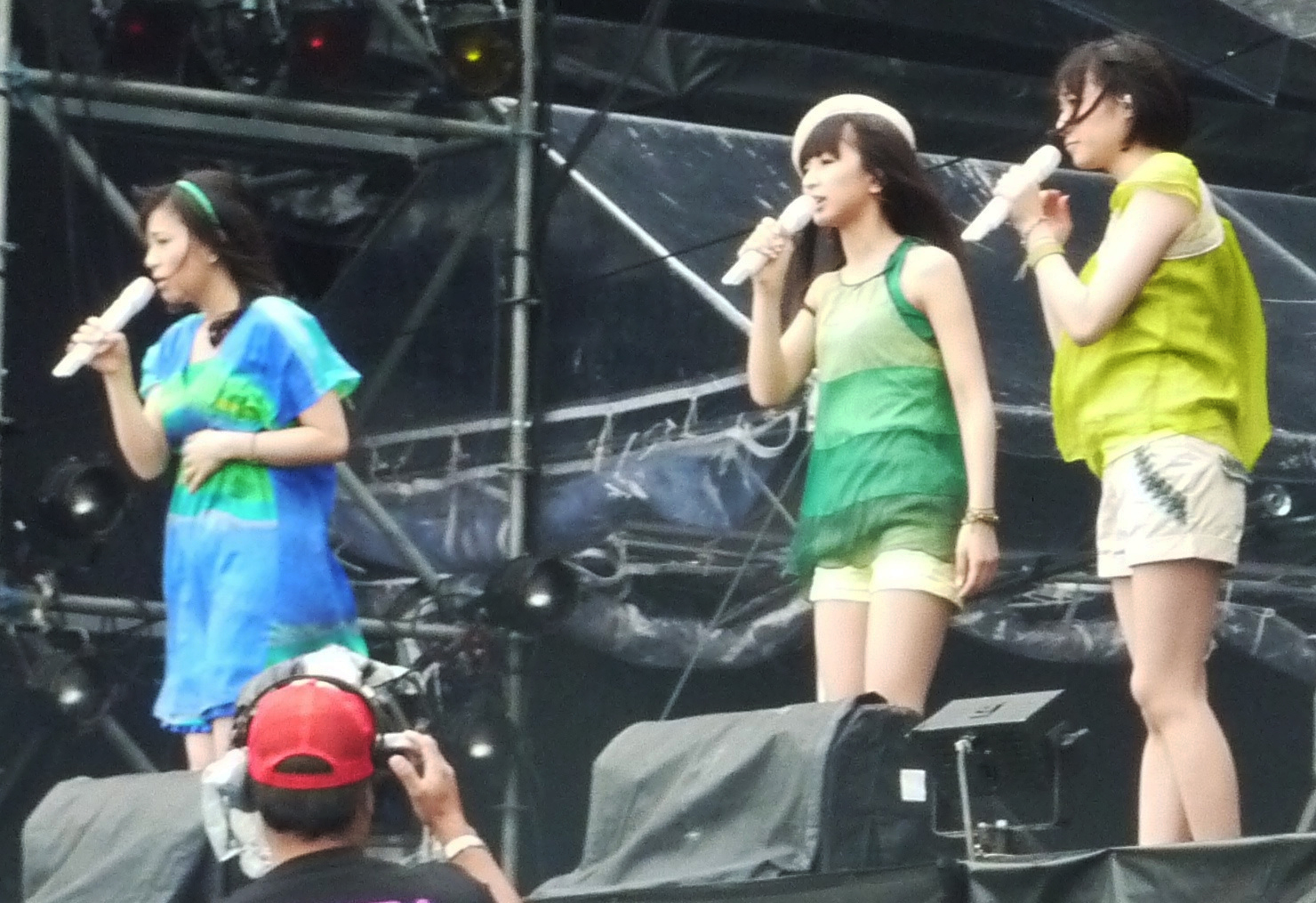
Perfume is a girl group of J-pop and Electropop, born in Hiroshima, Japan.

- Paradises (group)
- Paris match
- Pasocom Music Club
- Passcode (group)
- Passpo
- Perfume
- Phantom Siita
- Piggs
- Piko
- PINK CRES.
- Pink Lady
- Pistol Valve
- Pizzicato Five
- Plastics
- Porno Graffitti
- The Possible
- Princess Princess
- PrizmaX
- Prizmmy☆
- Psychic Lover
- PUFFY

== Q ==
- Qumali Depart
- Quruli

== R ==
- Radwimps
- Rag Fair
- Rake
- Rats & Star
- Ray
- Ray
- Naoto Inti Raymi
- Remioromen
- Rinoie, Joe
- Ringwanderung
- Rip Slyme
- RIRI
- Romantic Mode
- Round Table
- Run Girls, Run!
- Run&Gun
- Rurutia
- Rythem
- Ryutist

== S ==
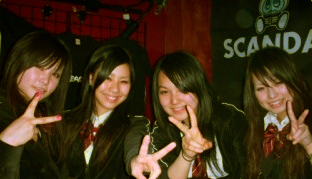
SCANDAL at Japan Nite US Tour 2008

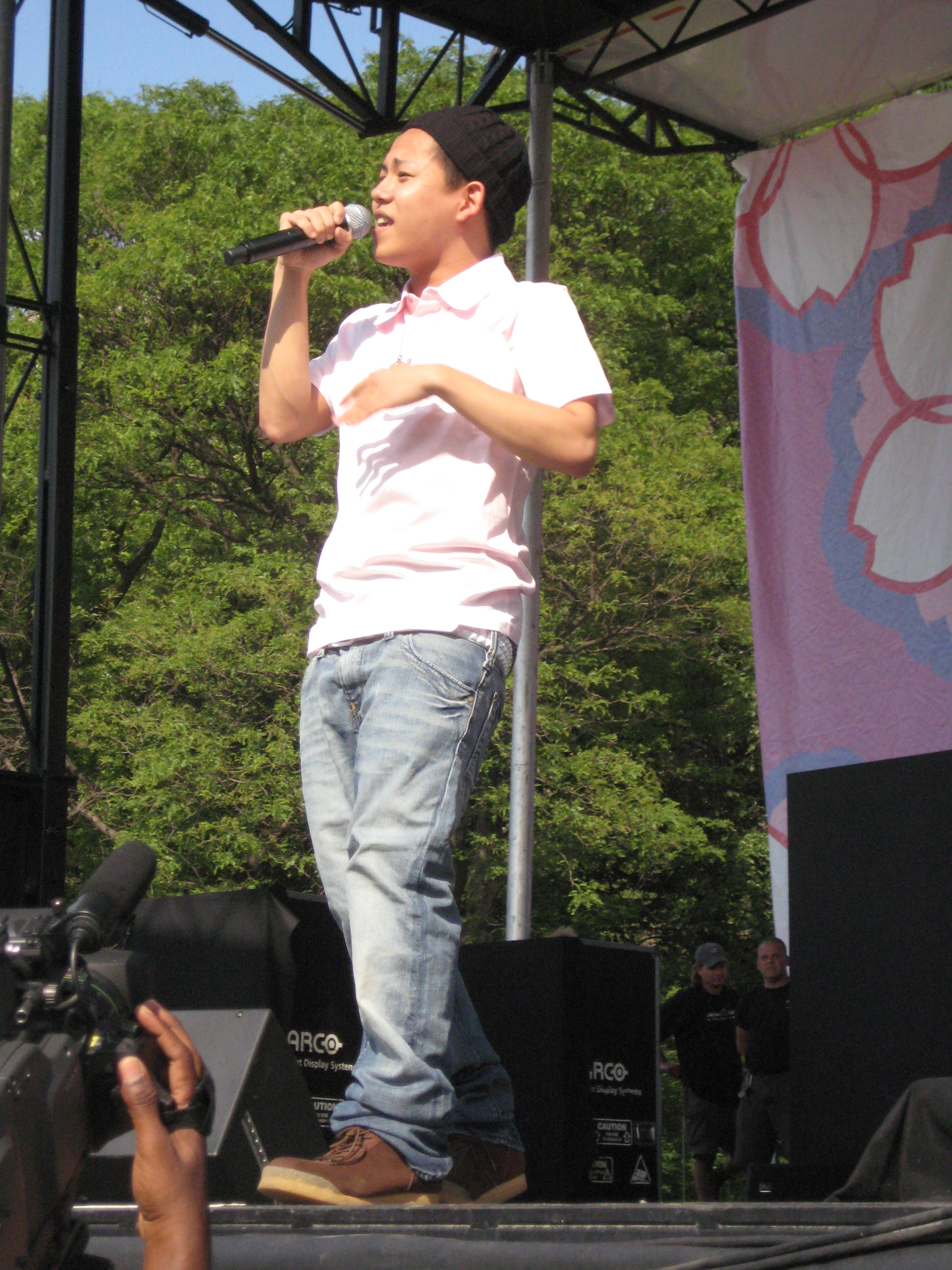
Shōta Shimizu performing at Japan Day 2008 in Central Park

- S/mileage
- Sada, Masashi
- Saiga, Mitsuki
- Saijo, Hideki
- Saito, Yuki
- Sakai, Mikio
- Sakai, Noriko
- Sakakibara, Yui
- Sakamoto, Kyu
- Sakamoto, Maaya
- Sakamoto, Miu
- Sakamoto, Ryuichi
- Sakura Gakuin
- Sakurai, Sho
- Sakurai, Tomo
- Sakurazaka46
- Salyu
- Sandaime J Soul Brothers
- Sandii & the Sunsetz
- Sano, Motoharu
- Saori@destiny
- Sashihara, Rino
- Satō, Hiromi
- savage genius
- Sayuri
- Sid
- SAWA
- Sawada, Kenji
- Erika Sawajiri
- SCANDAL
- The Scanty
- School Food Punishment
- SDN48
- Seagull Screaming Kiss Her Kiss Her
- Seamo
- See-Saw
- Sekai no Owari
- Sexy Zone
- Sharam Q
- Shibasaki, Kou
- Shibata, Jun
- Subaru Shibutani
- Shiina, Ringo
- Shimabukuro, Hiroko
- Shimamiya, Eiko
- Shimatani, Hitomi
- Shimizu, Ai
- Shota Shimizu
- Shimokawa, Mikuni
- Shinohara, Tomoe
- Shintani Ryōko
- Shiritsu Ebisu Chugaku
- Shirota, Yū
- Shishido, Rumi
- Shugo Chara Egg!
- Shuchishin
- Sifow
- Silent Siren
- SixTones
- SKE48
- SMAP
- Snow Man
- Sonim
- Sophia
- Sora tob sakana
- SoulJa
- Sowelu
- SPEED
- Spitz
- Stereopony
- Suga, Shikao
- Straightener
- Sukima Switch
- Sunmyu
- Sunny Day Service
- SunSet Swish
- Super Monkey's
- Supercar
- supercell
- Superfly
- Suzuki, Airi
- Suzuki, Ami
- Suzuki, Masayuki
- Suzumura, Kenichi
- SweetS
- Sweet Steady

== T ==
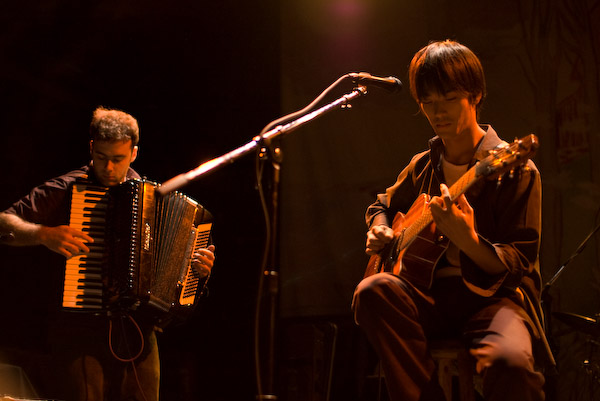
Shugo Tokumaru (on guitar) at the Bowery Ballroom

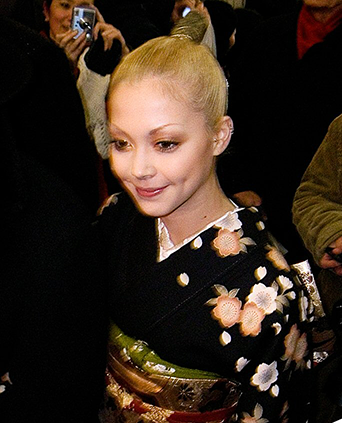
Anna Tsuchiya at Berlinale

- T-Bolan
- Tackey and Tsubasa
- Tadokoro, Azusa
- Tainaka, Sachi
- Takahashi, Hitomi
- Takahashi, Minami
- Takahashi, Naozumi
- Takahashi, Yoko
- Takaki, Yuya
- Takami, Hiroyuki
- Tamaki, Nami
- Tamura, Eriko
- Tamura, Yukari
- Tamurapan
- Tanimura Nana
- Tanaka, Rie
- Tange, Sakura
- Tanpopo
- Tatsuya Kitani
- Team Syachihoko
- Tegomass
- Teriyaki Boyz
- Terra
- Teshima, Aoi
- Tetsuya
- Teresa Teng
- TiA
- tiaraway
- TM Network
- T.M.Revolution
- Tofubeats
- Togawa, Jun
- 東方神起
- Tokio (band)
- Tokumaru, Shugo
- Tokyo Girls' Style
- Tokyo Jihen
- TOMOO
- Toru Kitajima
- TRF
- TrySail
- Tsuchiya, Anna
- Tsuchiya, Masami
- Tsunku
- Tsuyuzaki, Harumi (Lyrico)
- Tube (band)
- Twinklestars
- Two-Mix
- Twice

== U ==
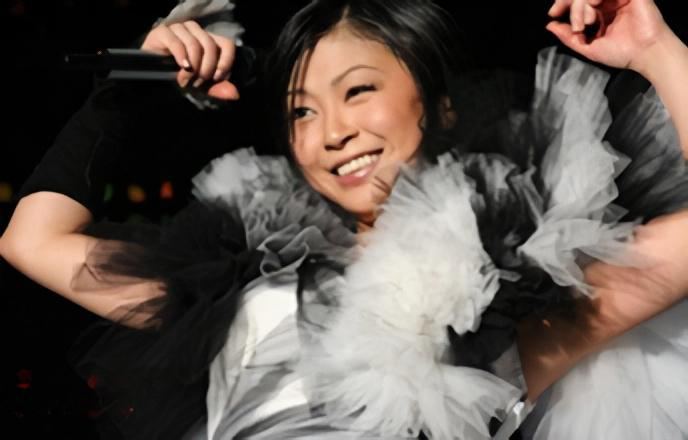
Hikaru Utada's second studio album First Love is the best selling album in Japan.

- U-ka saegusa IN db
- UA
- Uchida, Maaya
- Uchida, Yuki
- Uehara, Azumi
- Uehara, Takako
- Kana Uemura
- Uijin
- Ulfuls
- Unison Square Garden
- Utada, Hikaru
- Utatsuki, Kaori
- Ukka
- Utoku, Keiko
- Uverworld

== V ==
- v-u-den
- V6
- Valshe
- Van, Tomiko
- Vaundy
- Vivid

== W ==
- W
- w-inds.
- Wada, Kōji
- Wagakki Band
- WANDS
- Wasuta
- WaT
- Watanabe, Mayu
- Watanabe, Misato
- Watarirouka Hashiritai
- Weather Girls
- White Ash
- Whiteberry
- WHY@DOLL
- Wink
- Wino
- Wyse

== X ==
- XY

== Y ==
- Ya-ya-yah
- Yabu, Kota
- Yaida, Hitomi
- Yamada, Keiko
- Yamada, Ryosuke
- Yamaguchi, Momoe
- Yamashita, Tatsuro
- Yamashita, Tomohisa
- Yamazaki, Masayoshi
- Yanagi, Nagi
- Yano, Maki
- Yaotome, Hikaru
- Yazumi, Kana
- Yellow Generation
- Yoasobi
- Yoji Biomehanika
- Yonekura, Chihiro
- Kenshi Yonezu
- Yorico
- Yorushika
- Yōsei Teikoku
- Yoshida, Miwa
- Yoshida, Takuro
- You'll Melt More!
- Younha
- YUI
- YUKA
- Yukana
- Yuki
- Yuko Anai
- Yuma Nakayama w/B.I.Shadow
- Yumemiru Adolescence
- Yuna Ito
- YURIA
- Yusa, Mimori
- Yuzu
- Yumi Shizukusa

== Z ==
- ZARD
- Zebra Queen
- Zenbu Kimi no Sei da.
- ZOC
- Zone
- Zoo
- ZYX
- ZZ

== See also ==
- List of musical artists from Japan
