= List of girl groups =

Girl groups are musical groups that only contain female vocalists. This is distinct from all-female bands, wherein the members themselves perform the instrumental components of the music (see List of all-female bands).

== 0–9 and symbols ==
- @onefive (Japan)
- °C-ute (Japan)
- 11:30 (Canada)
- 15& (South Korea)
- 22/7 (Japan)
- 2NE1 (South Korea)
- 2R (Hong Kong)
- 2YOON (South Korea)
- 3Quency (United States)
- 3YE (South Korea)
- 3 of Hearts (United States)
- 3LW (United States)
- 3rd Faze (United States)
- The 411 (United Kingdom)
- 4 in Love (Taiwan)
- 4 Cats (Lebanon)
- 4Minute (South Korea)
- 4th Impact (Philippines)
- 5Angels (Czech Republic)
- 702 (United States)
- 7Senses (China)
- 9.9 (United States)
- 9nine (Japan)

== A ==
- Aa! (Japan)
- Abcho (Japan)
- The Ad Libs (United States)
- Aespa (South Korea)
- Afro-dite (Sweden)
- After School (South Korea)
- Ai-Girls (Japan)
- AKB48 (Japan)
- AKB48 Team SH (China)
- AKB48 Team TP (Taiwan)
- Akishibu Project (Japan)
- Al Balabil (Sudan)
- Alisha's Attic (United Kingdom)
- All Saints (United Kingdom)
- Allure (United States)
- Aly & AJ (United States)
- Amiaya (Japan)
- Andrews Sisters (United States)
- The Angels (United States)
- Angerme (formerly S/mileage) (Japan)
- Anna S (Japan)
- AOA (South Korea)
- AOA Black
- AOA Cream
- Apink (South Korea)
- Appleton (Canada)
- Apollonia 6 (United States)
- Aqua5 (Japan)
- Ariaz (South Korea)
- Artms (South Korea)
- As One (Hong Kong)
- As One (South Korea)
- Atarashii Gakko! (Japan)
- Athena & Robikerottsu (Japan)
- Atomic Kitten (United Kingdom)

== B ==
- BaBe (Japan)
  - Tomoko Kondo, Yukari Nikaido
- Babymetal (Japan)
- Babyraids Japan (Japan)
- Baby Vox (South Korea)
- Babymonster (South Korea)
- Baccara (Spain)
- Badvillain (South Korea)
- Bakusute Sotokanda Icchome (Japan)
- Bananarama (United Kingdom)
- Bandana (Argentina)
- Barbara and the Uniques (United States)
- Bardot (Australia)
- BB Girls (South Korea)
- Before Dark (United States)
- BeForU (Japan)
- BEJ48 (China)
- Belle Amie (United Kingdom)
- Bellefire (Ireland)
- Bellepop (Spain)
- Berryz Kobo (Japan)
- BESTie (South Korea)
- Beauty4 (Taiwan)
- The Beu Sisters (United States)
- Bi-ray (Japan)
- Bini (Philippines)
- Bisou (Germany)
- Blackpink (South Korea)
- Blackswan (South Korea)
- Blaque (United States)
- Blink Indonesia (Indonesia)
- The Blossoms (United States)
- Blush (Philippines, India, Hong Kong, Japan, South Korea)
- BNK48 (Thailand)
- The Bobbettes (United States)
- Boswell Sisters (United States)
- Botopass (South Korea)
- Boy Krazy (United States)
- Boys World (United States)
- The Braillettes (United States)
- The Braxtons (United States)
- Bright (Japan)
- Brown Eyed Girls (South Korea)
- Brownstone (United States)
- bump.y (Japan)
- BugABoo (South Korea)
- Buono! (Japan)
- Bubbles (Sweden)
- Buzy (Japan)
- Bvndit (South Korea)
- B*Witched (Ireland)
- BY2 (Singapore, Taiwan)

== C ==
- The Cake (United States)
- Candies (Japan)
- Candy Shop (South Korea)
- The Caravelles (United Kingdom)
- The Carefrees (United Kingdom)
- Celeb Five (South Korea)
- Chakra (South Korea)
- Changing Faces (United States)
- The Chantels (United States)
- Checkicco (Japan)
- The Cheeky Girls (Romania)
- Cheeky Parade (Japan)
- The Cheetah Girls (United States)
- Cherish (United States)
- Cherry (Australia)
- Cherrybelle (Indonesia)
- Cherry Bullet (South Korea)
- The Chicks (formerly Dixie Chicks) (United States)
- The Chiffons (United States)
- China Dolls (Thailand)
- Chocolat (South Korea)
- Chocolate, Menta, Mastik (Israel)
- Chocolove from AKB48 (Japan)
- The Chordettes (United States)
- Ciao Bella Cinquetti (formerly The Possible) (Japan)
- Cignature (South Korea)
- Cimorelli (United States)
- ClariS (Japan)
- Classy (South Korea)
- CLC (South Korea)
- Clea (United Kingdom)
- Clear's (Japan)
- Cleopatra (United Kingdom)
- Clique Girlz (United States)
- Cobra Killer (Germany)
- CoCo (Japan)
- Coconuts Musume (Japan)
- Collar (Hong Kong)
- Company B (United States)
- Cookies (Hong Kong)
- The Cookies (United States)
- Country Musume (now Country Girls) (Japan)
- Cosmic Girls (also WJSN) (South Korea, China)
- The Cover Girls (United States)
- Craxy (South Korea)
- Crayon Pop (South Korea)
- The Crystals (United States)
- CSR (South Korea)
- Cute (Japan)
- CY8ER (Japan)

== D ==
- D&D (Japan)
- Dal Shabet (South Korea)
- Dancing Dolls (Japan)
- Danity Kane (United States)
- Daphne and Celeste (United States)
- Davichi (South Korea)
- Def.Diva (Japan)
- Deja Vu (United Kingdom, Venezuela)
- Dempagumi.inc (Japan)
- Destiny's Child (United States)
- DIA (group) (South Korea)
- Diadems (France)
- Diamond Cats (Czech Republic)
- Diva (Japan)
- The Dixie Cups (United States)
- The Dixiebelles (United States)
- Doce (Portugal)
- DoCo (Japan)
- DOLLA (Malaysia)
- Doll Elements (Japan)
- Dolly Dots (Netherlands)
- Dorothy Little Happy (Japan)
- Dream (Japan)
- Dream (United States)
- Dreamcatcher (South Korea)
- Dream Girls (Taiwan, South Korea)
- Dream Morning Musume (Japan)
- DreamNote (South Korea)

== E ==
- E-girls (Japan)
- Ecomoni (Japan)
- Eden's Crush (United States)
- El7z Up (South Korea)
- The Emotions (United States)
- En Vogue (United States)
- Escarcha (Colombia)
- Especia (Japan)
- Eternal (United Kingdom)
- Eternity (South Korea)
- The Exciters (United States)
- Everglow (South Korea)
- Excellence (Sweden)
- EXID (South Korea)
- Exposé (United States)
- EyeQ (Denmark)

== F ==
- f(x) (South Korea, China)
- Fab! (Ireland)
- Fairies (Japan)
- FAKY (Japan)
- FANATICS (South Korea)
- Fem2fem (United States)
- Feminnem (Croatia, Bosnia-Herzegovina)
- Fifth Harmony (United States)
- Fifty Fifty (South Korea)
- Fin.K.L. (South Korea)
- Flans (Mexico)
- Flap Girls' School (Japan)
- The Flirtations (United States)
- Flo (United Kingdom)
- Flower (Japan)
- Four Golden Princess (Malaysia)
- The Four King Cousins (United States)
- Four of Diamonds (United Kingdom)
- Frank (United Kingdom)
- French Kiss (Japan)
- As Frenéticas (Brazil)
- Fromis 9 (South Korea)
- Funky Diamonds (Germany)

== G ==
- G22 (Philippines)
- GAM (Japan)
- Geenius (South Korea)
- GFriend (South Korea)
- (G)I-dle (South Korea)
- Gimmel (Finland)
- Girlband (Australia)
- Girlfriend/gf4 (Australia)
- Girlkind (South Korea)
- Girlset (United States)
- Girl Group (United Kingdom, Norway)
- Girls Aloud (United Kingdom, Ireland)
- Girls Can't Catch (United Kingdom)
- Girl's Day (South Korea)
- Girls Don't Sync (United Kingdom)
- Girlicious (United States)
- Girls (Brazil)
- Girl Authority (United States)
- Girls' Generation (South Korea, United States)
- Girl Thing (United Kingdom)
- GNZ48 (China)
- Golden Girls (South Korea)
- Gomattō (Japan)
- The Grace (South Korea)
- G.R.L. (Canada, United Kingdom, United States)
- The GTOs (United States)
- Guardians 4 (Japan)
- GWSN (South Korea)

== H ==
- H1-Key (South Korea)
- Ha*Ash (United States, Mexico)
- Happiness (Japan)
- Thee Headcoatees (United Kingdom)
  - Holly Golightly, Kyra LaRubia, Ludella Black, "Bongo" Debbie Green.
- Heartsdales (Japan)
- Hearts2Hearts (South Korea)
- Hello Venus (South Korea)
- Hepsi (Turkey)
- Hey Girl (Taiwan)
- Hi-5 (Greece, Cyprus)
- High-King (Japan)
- Hinapia (South Korea)
- HITGS (South Korea)
- HKT48 (Japan)
- Hōkago Princess (Japan)
- Honey Popcorn (South Korea)
- The Honeys (United States)
- Honeyz (United Kingdom)
- HotCha (Hong Kong)
- Hot Issue (South Korea)
- HR (Japan)
- Huckapoo (United States)
- Hurricane (Serbia)

== I ==
- i5 (Philippines, Israel, United States, United Kingdom, Mexico)
- I.B.I (South Korea)
- Ichillin' (South Korea)
- I.O.I (South Korea)
- I Me (China)
- i.n.g (Taiwan)
- Ice Creamusume (Taiwan)
- Idol College (Japan)
- Idol Renaissance (Japan)
- Illit (South Korea)
- ILY:1 (South Korea)
- Innosense (United States)
- IQ (United States)
- Irris (South Korea)
- Isyss (United States)
- Itzy (South Korea)
- Iz*One (South Korea, Japan)
- i☆Ris (Japan)
- Ive (South Korea)

== J ==
- J.J. Fad
- Jackson Mendoza
- Jade (United States)
- Jamali (South Africa)
- Jaynetts (United States, 1960s)
- Jeans (Mexico)
- Jewelry (South Korea)
- JKT48 (Indonesia)
- JS (United States)
- Juice=Juice (Japan)
- June's Diary (United States)

== K ==
- K3 (Belgium)
- K/DA (Virtual)
- KAIA (Philippines)
- Kamen Joshi (Japan)
- Kamen Rider Girls (Japan)
- Kara (South Korea)
- Katseye (United States)
- Keyakizaka46 (Japan)
- Kep1er (South Korea)
- KiiiKiii (South Korea)
- King Sisters (United States)
- Kira Pika (Japan)
- Kiroro (Japan)
- Kiruba (Ecuador)
- Kiss of Life (South Korea)
- Krusty (Hong Kong)
- Ksis (Brazil)

== L ==
- L5 (France)
- Laboum (South Korea)
- Ladies' Code (South Korea)
- Lapillus (South Korea)
- Las Cheris (Puerto Rico)
- Las Ketchup (Spain)
- LaViVe (Germany)
- L.E.J (France)
- Leandah (Germany)
- Lemonescent (United Kingdom)
- The Lennon Sisters (United States)
- Le Sserafim (South Korea)
- Lightsum (South Korea)
- Lillix (Canada)
- LimeLight (South Korea)
- LinQ (Japan)
- Little Mix (United Kingdom)
- Little Trees (Denmark)
- Loïs Lane (The Netherlands)
- Lollipop (Italy)
- Lolly Talk (Hong Kong)
- Loona (South Korea)
- Loossemble (South Korea)
- Love & Sas (Canada)
- Love Bites (England)
- Lovely Doll (Japan)
- Lovelyz (South Korea)
- Lunarsolar (South Korea)
- Luv' (Netherlands)
- Lyrical School (Japan)

== M ==
- M Three (Japan)
- M-Girls (Malaysia)
- M2M (Norway)
- Madasun (United Kingdom)
- Mamamoo (South Korea)
- Mania (United Kingdom)
- Manifest (Turkey)
- Mango (Lithuania)
- Marcie Jones and the Cookies (Australia)
- Martha & the Vandellas (United States)
- The Marvelettes (United States)
- Mary Jane Girls (United States)
- Mary Mary (United States)
- Maustetytöt (Finland)
- Mave: (South Korea)
- Maywish (South Korea)
- Maywood (Netherlands)
- Me N Ma Girls (Burma)
- Mel & Kim (United Kingdom)
- Melon Kinenbi (Japan)
- The Mess (France)
- Milky Holmes (Japan)
- Millionaires (United States)
- Milky Way (Japan)
- Mimiirose (South Korea)
- Minimoni (Japan)
- Mini Viva (United Kingdom)
- Mirami (Ukraine)
- Mis-Teeq (United Kingdom)
- MiSaMo (Japan)
- Miss A (South Korea)
- MNL48 (Philippines)
- Mocha Girls (Philippines)
- Moje 3 (Serbia)
- MoKenStef (United States)
- Momoiro Clover Z (Japan)
- Momoland (South Korea)
- Monrose (Germany)
- Morning Musume (Japan)
- The Murmaids (United States)
- MKS (United Kingdom)

== N ==
- Nakano Fujo Sisters (Japan)
- Nature (South Korea)
- Neon Jungle (United Kingdom)
- Neon Punch (South Korea)
- NewJeans (South Korea)
- Niki & Gabi (United States)
- Nina Sky (United States)
- Nine Muses (South Korea)
- NiziU (Japan)
- NMB48 (Japan)
- Nmixx (South Korea)
- no3b (Japan)
- No Angels (Germany)
- No Na (Indonesia)
- No Secrets (United States, United Kingdom)
- Nobody's Angel (United States)
- Nochiura Natsumi (Japan)
- Nogizaka46 (Japan)
- The Nolans (Ireland, United Kingdom)
- Nonstop (Portugal)
- Northern State (United States)
- Not Yet (Japan)
- Nu Virgos (Ukraine)
- Nylon (Iceland)
- N Zero (Japan)

== O ==
- Odd Eye Circle (South Korea)
- O'G3NE (Netherlands)
- Oh!GG (South Korea)
- Oh My Girl (South Korea)
- The OMG Girlz (United States)
- One Voice (Philippines)
- Orange Caramel (South Korea)
- Osaka Performance Doll (Japan)
- Otome Shinto (Japan)
- Otome Syndream (Hong Kong)
- Out of Eden (United States)

== P ==
- Pandora (Mexico)
- The Paris Sisters (USA)
- Party Rockets GT (Japan)
- Pepsi and Shirlie (United Kingdom)
- Perfume (Japan)
- Petitmoni (Japan)
- Pink Fantasy (South Korea)
- Pink Lady (Japan)
- The Pipettes (United Kingdom)
- Pixy (South Korea)
- Play (Sweden)
- Point of Grace
- The Pointer Sisters (United States)
- The Poppies
- Popu Lady (Taiwan)
- Precious (United Kingdom)
- Predia (Japan)
- Preluders (Germany)
- Primrose (South Korea)
- Prizmmy (Japan)
- Pucchi Moni (Japan): see Petitmoni
- Pump Girls (United States)
- Purplebeck (South Korea)
- Purple Kiss (South Korea)
- The Pussycat Dolls (United States)
- PYT (United States)

== Q ==
- Quarteto em Cy (Brazil)
- Queen & Elizabeth (Japan)
- Queens (Poland)
- Queensberry (Germany)
- QWER (South Korea)

== R ==
- Rainbow (South Korea)
- Rescene (South Korea)
- Redsquare (South Korea)
- Red Velvet (South Korea)
- Reflex (Russia)
- Remember Monday (United Kingdom)
- Rev. from DVL (Japan)
- Reynolds Girls (United Kingdom)
- RichGirl (United States)
- The Roches (United States)
- Rocket Girls (China)
- Rocket Punch (South Korea)
- Romans (Japan)
- The Ronettes (United States)
- Rouge (Brazil)
- The Rounder Girls (Austria)

== S ==
- Sakura Gakuin (Japan)
- Salt-N-Pepa (United States)
- Saturday (South Korea)
- The Saturdays (United Kingdom, Ireland)
- Say Now (United Kingdom)
- SDN48 (Japan)
- Secret (South Korea)
- Secret Number (South Korea)
- Seduction (United States)
- SeeYa (South Korea)
- The SeeYa (South Korea)
- The Sequence (United States)
- Serebro (Russia)
- SES (South Korea)
- SexBomb Girls (Philippines)
- SGO48
- Shakaya (Australia)
- Shakespears Sister (United Kingdom)
- The Shangri-Las (United States)
- S.H.E (Taiwan)
- SHeDAISY (United States)
- The Shirelles (United States)
- Shiritsu Ebisu Chugaku (Japan)
- Shugo Chara Egg! (Japan)
- Silver Convention (Germany)
- S.I.N.G (China)
- Siren Society (United States, Australia)
- Sistanova (Germany)
- Sistar (South Korea)
- The Sisters Love (United States)
- Sister Sledge (United States)
- SKE48 (Japan)
- Slinkee Minx (Australia)
- Slumber Party Girls (United States)
- Smile.dk (Sweden)
- SNH48 (China)
- SNZ (Brazil)
- SOAP (Denmark)
- Sonamoo (South Korea)
- SOS (Indonesia)
- Solid Harmonie (United Kingdom, United States)
- Soluna (United States)
- SPICA (South Korea)
- Spice Girls (United Kingdom)
- Starling Arrow (United States)
- STAYC (South Korea)
- Stellar (South Korea)
- Stooshe (United Kingdom)
- Strawberry Switchblade (United Kingdom)
- STRAYZ (Hong Kong)
- Sugababes (United Kingdom)
- Sugar Jones (Canada)
- Sunmyu (Japan)
- Super Girls (Japan)
- Super Girls (Hong Kong)
- Supernova (Chile)
- The Supremes (United States)
- Sweet California (Spain)
- Sweet Female Attitude (United Kingdom)
- Sweet Honey in the Rock (United States)
- Sweet Love (United Kingdom)
- Sweets (Japan)
- Sweety (Taiwan)
- SWV (United States)

== T ==
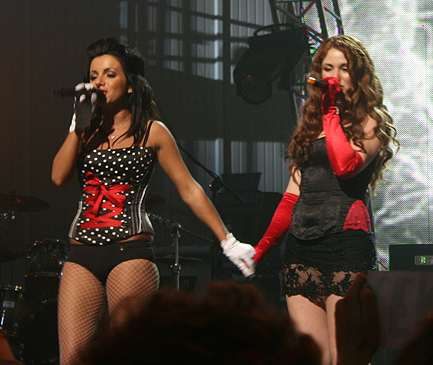
t.A.T.u.

- t.A.T.u. (Russia)
- Tanpopo (Japan)
- T-ara (South Korea)
- Taiyō to Ciscomoon (Japan)
- Team Syachihoko (Japan)
- Teen Queens (Australia)
- Tess (Spain)
- Tha Rayne (United States)
- The Three Degrees (United States)
- Thriii (United States)
- Tiny-G (South Korea)
- TLC (United States)
- Tokyo Girls' Style (Japan)
- Tokyo Performance Doll (Japan)
- Total (United States)
- The Toys (United States)
- TrueBliss (New Zealand)
- TrySail (Japan)
- Tri.be (South Korea)
- TripleS (South Korea)
- Tsuri Bit (Japan)
- TSZX (Korea)
- Tú (Canada)
- Twins (Hong Kong, Canada)
- Twice (South Korea, Japan, Taiwan)

== U ==
- Ultra Girl (Japan)
- Up Up Girls (Kakko Kari) (Japan)
- Unis (South Korea)
- Uni.T (South Korea)

== V ==
- v-u-den (Japan)
- Vanilla (United Kingdom)
- Vanity 6 (United States)
- Ventino (Colombia)
- The Veronicas (Australia)
- VIA Gra (Russia)
- Viva (India)
- Viviz (South Korea)
- Viva Hot Babes (Philippines)
- The Voices (United States)

== W ==
- W (Japan)
- Walkie Talkie (Taiwan)
- Wassup (South Korea)
- Watarirouka Hashiritai 7 (Japan)
- Weather Girls (Taiwan, Japan)
- The Weather Girls (United States)
- Weeekly (South Korea)
- We Girls (South Korea)
- Wendy & Lisa (United States)
- West End Girls (Canada)
- Why@Doll (Japan)
- Wilson Phillips (United States)
- Wild Orchid (United States)
- W.i.S.H.(India)
- WJMK (South Korea)
- Wonder Girls (South Korea)
- Wonderland (Ireland, United Kingdom)
- Wooah (South Korea)

== X ==
- X21 (Japan)
- XG (Japan)
- XO (United Kingdom)
- Xscape (United States)
- XXL (Republic of Macedonia)

== Y ==
- Young Divas (Australia)
- Young Posse (South Korea)
- Yumemiru Adolescence (Japan)

== Z ==
- Zhané (United States)
- ZOEgirl (United States)
- ZYX (Japan)

== See also ==
- List of all-female bands
- Lists of musicians
