= Beauty4 =

Taiwanese girl group

Beauty4 was a Taiwanese girl group consisting of Anji Clubb, Belinda Cheng, Ayesha Adamo, and Djavan Lin. The group was active in the early 2000s and released music through EMI Taiwan.

== History ==
Beauty4 was established by Corbett Wall. On November 22, 2000, the group released its self-titled debut album through EMI Records Taiwan. The lead single, "Ai Ai Ai" (Love Love Love), served as the closing theme for the television series Ling-Lan; it was later moved to the series' opening position, replacing a track by Faye Wong.

During the promotional cycle for the album, Beauty4 performed at events alongside artists such as B.A.D., May Day, Karen Mok, and Sticky Rice. The group also performed with the Canadian band The Moffatts and recorded a Mandarin cover of their song "Bang Bang Boom". Beauty4's music videos appeared on the Top 20 countdowns of Channel V and MTV Taiwan. While the album was released in mainland China, the tracks "Gay Guy" and "San Gu Liu Pau" were banned by regional authorities.

The group participated in several commercial endorsements, including campaigns for the Jian Fu San amusement park and Bao Dao Mei Mei. Member Cheng portrayed the character Bai-He in the television series Meteor Garden, while Ayesha, Anji, and Djavan appeared in cameo roles. Anji later played the role of Maria in Yamada Tarō Monogatari.

Beauty4 disbanded following conflicts with management and difficulties establishing a domestic identity in the Taiwanese market. Despite half of the members being of Taiwanese ethnicity and the group's integration into local media, including a week-long hosting engagement on Taipei's Power 98.9 and a performance for the Republic of China Army on Kinmen, their perceived "foreign" appearance was cited as a factor in their limited cultural acceptance.

== Members before and after Beauty4 ==
Anji Clubb came to Taiwan as a nine-year-old and spent several years of elementary school in the Taiwanese school system, making her Mandarin completely fluent. After the breakup of Beauty4, Clubb returned to the US, having spent half of her life overseas, and recently graduated from Georgetown University, though she also took time to study in Beijing. She is currently the China Programs Associate at Campaign for Tobacco Free Kids, a non-profit organization with programs in the U.S. and abroad.

Belinda Cheng, the jet-haired Chinese-American, was the first to audition for the group's management company. She auditioned in California, where she was born and raised. Belinda Cheng returned to Los Angeles after the group's breakup and graduated from UCLA. She is now working at Disney Interactive Studios and working towards an MBA at UCLA.

The blonde and pink-haired Ayesha Adamo was a Columbia University student spending the summer in Taiwan studying Chinese when she auditioned and found her way into the group. Although she had only studied Chinese at college for one year, she was able to keep up with the challenges of singing and interviewing in Mandarin. Adamo released a mix album that was a double CD box set as a DJ on Hinote Records in Taiwan. She graduated with a degree in music from Barnard College, and completed the two-year acting program at William Esper Studios. She performed at Radio City Music Hall in New York with Mandarin pop star Qsi Qsin for a New Year's Concert in 2006. She is currently acting, deejaying, and recording new music.

Finally, the curly-haired, oft-mistaken-for-African-American Djavan Lin was born and raised in Taiwan, and is of Taiwanese aboriginal origin. Djavan Lin has continued her singing career, and performed on CTV Network's popular singing competition. She is currently singing and performing in Macau.

== See also ==
- Mando-pop
- Taiwanese pop
