= Chu-Z =

Japanese idol girl group

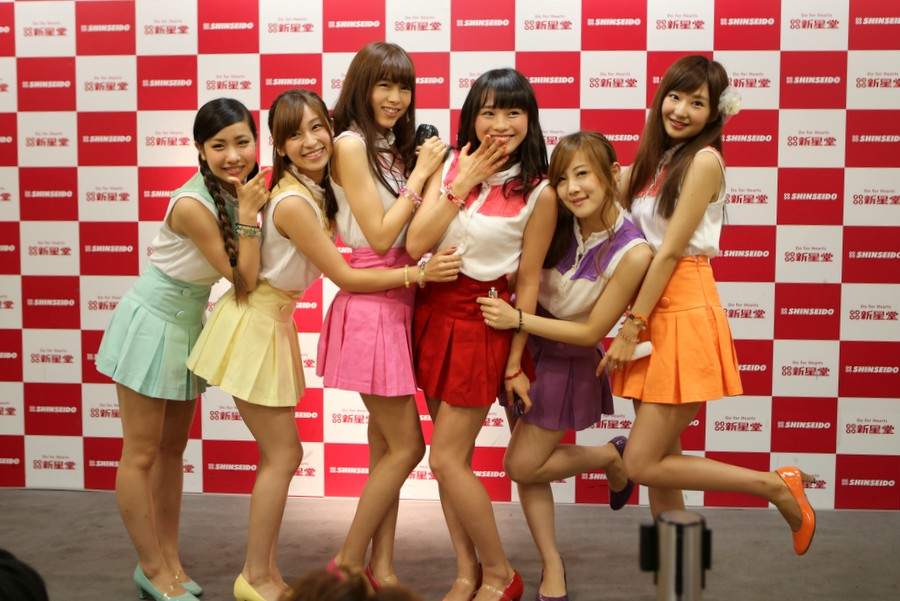
- Chu-Z in 2013

Background information
- Origin: Japan
- Genres: J-pop
- Years active: 2012–2024
- Labels: Good Choice Entertainment
- Members: Luna; Kana; Kaede; Futaba; Moeha Nishi
- Past members: Hatsune; Asuka; Maia; Honomi; Miyabi; Miku; Kanako Kasuga; Mana; Moe; Revolution Mayu
- Website: www.chu-z.com

Chu-Z was a Japanese idol girl group that formed in 2012.

== History ==
=== 2012–2015: Formation and major label debut ===
Chu-Z was formed in July 2012. The initial line-up consisted of seven members: Maia, Asuka, Luna, Kana, Miku, Kaede, and Hatsune. Hatsune graduated from the group on December 26, 2012. Chu-Z released three indie singles in 2013: their debut single "Chu-Z My Life" on February 20, followed by "Chu Me Now!!" on July 9, and "a.no.ne" on October 30. At the end of 2013, Chu-Z signed with Nippon Columbia to make their major label debut.

They released their major debut album, Chu-Z My Music, on July 9, 2014. Their first major single, "Boombastic!" was released on October 1. Their second major single, the double A-side "Hana no Arch / Brand Boy", was released on February 11, 2015, followed by their third major single, "Tell me why Umarete Kita Imi wo Shiritai", on July 1.

=== 2016–2019: Label changes ===
They released their second major album, Chu-Z My Selection, on March 9, 2016. Asuka graduated from the group on March 24. On October 2, Mayu and Honomi joined the group. On November 23, they released their fourth major single, the triple A-side "Mada Kimi ga Suki de / Meow! / Keep Me Out Of Heaven", through their new label Imperial Records.

On January 20, 2017, Maia graduated from the group. On March 13, Futaba joined the group. They fifth major single, "Yubiwa no Yukue", was released on June 21.

On February 23, 2018, Honomi went on hiatus. Their sixth major single, "Gonna be alright!", was released on March 21. Honomi left the group on April 3. On June 29, Moe joined the group. On October 3, they released their seventh major single, "Pariro!", through their new label Otodama Records.

On April 24, 2019, it was announced that a new member: Miyabi and former Tokyo CuteCute members Moeha Nishi and Kanako Kasuga would join the group on May 24. However, Miyabi withdrew from the line-up on May 2. They released their eighth major single, "Baribarinrin", through their new label Victoria Beats on July 9.

=== 2020–2024: Line-up changes and hiatus ===
On September 27, 2020, Miku graduated from the group and new member Mana joined. Kanako Kasuga graduated on November 18.

Mana withdrew from the group on February 28, 2021. Moe graduated on December 27. Mayu was fired from the group on March 10, 2022, due to a breach of contract.

On August 4, 2024, Chu-Z suspended all group activities.

== Members ==
Current

- Luna (留奈)
- Kana (加奈)
- Kaede (楓)
- Futaba (双葉)
- Moeha Nishi (西萌葉)

Former

- Hatsune (初音)
- Asuka (あすか)
- Maia (麻衣愛)
- Honomi (ほのみ)
- Miyabi (雅)
- Miku (ミク)
- Kanako Kasuga (春日かなこ)
- Mana (真菜)
- Moe (萌)
- Revolution Mayu (レボリューションMayu)

== Discography ==
=== Studio albums ===
List of studio albums, with selected details and chart positions
Title	Details	Peak chart positions	
Title	Details	JPN	JPN Hot
Chu-Z My Music	Released: July 9, 2014; Label: Nippon Columbia; Formats: CD, digital download, streaming	17	—
Chu-Z My Selection	Released: March 9, 2016; Label: Nippon Columbia; Formats: CD, digital download, streaming	25	41

=== Compilation albums ===
List of compilation albums, with selected details and chart positions
Title	Details	Peak chart positions	
Title	Details	JPN	JPN Hot
Chu-Z My Music "10"	Released: December 13, 2022; Label: Good Choice Label; Formats: CD, digital download, streaming	45	30

=== Singles ===
List of singles, with selected chart positions, showing year released and album name
Title	Year	Peak chart positions		Album
Title	Year	JPN	JPN Hot	Album
"Boombastic!" (ボンバスティック!)	2014	16	65	Chu-Z My Selection
"Hana no Arch / Brand Boy" (花のアーチ/Brand Boy)	2015	5	—	Chu-Z My Selection
"Tell me why Umarete Kita Imi wo Shiritai" (Tell me why 生まれて来た意味を知りたい)	2015	8	—	Chu-Z My Selection
"Mada Kimi ga Suki de / Meow! / Keep Me Out Of Heaven" (まだ君が好きで/Meow!/Keep Me Out Of Heaven)	2016	—	—	Non-album singles
"Yubiwa no Yukue" (指輪の行方)	2017	27	—	Non-album singles
"Gonna be alright!"	2018	18	—	Non-album singles
"Pariro!" (パリロッ!)	2018	10	—	Non-album singles
"Baribarinrin" (ばりばりんりん)	2019	12	49	Non-album singles
"—" denotes a recording that did not chart or was not released in that territory.
