= Takashi Aonishi =

Male Japanese popular music artist

Aonishi Takashi (青西 高嗣) is a male Japanese popular music artist. In 1995 his single "Nevertheless, alive" was used as the theme song for the NTV drama Daimon TAKE2 (代紋 TAKE2) and reached number one on the Oricon singles chart.

== Discography ==
=== Singles ===
- Chiisana Akari (11/2/1994)
- Nevertheless, alive (9/1/1995)
- Hitotu Negai ga Kanaunara (4/3/1997)
- "AO" corner (8/29/2001)
- sakamori (12/1/2002)

=== Albums ===
- AO CORNER (11/1/1995)
