= Barbara and the Uniques =

American R&B girl group

- Also known as: Barbara Blake and the Uniques
- Genres: R&B
- Years active: 1963–1975
- Labels: Arden, Abbot Records, 20th Century Records
- Past members: Barbara Livsey; Gwen Livsey; Doris Lindsey

Barbara and the Uniques was a 1960s and 1970s R&B girl group.

== History ==
The group began when the Du-ettes, a group from Chicago featuring Barbara Livsey and her cousin, Mary Hayes, was liquidated in 1965. Barbara got together with her sister Gwen Livsey and a friend, Doris Lindsey, and released the soul ballad "There It Goes Again" (written by Eugene Record of The Chi-Lites) as Barbara and the Uniques in 1970. The song was very successful at the local level, causing Arden Records to distribute it nationally. The song became an R&B hit, reaching #16 on the R&B charts. It was a minor US Billboard Hot 100 hit, where it reached #91.

The group followed up with two singles on the Arden label in 1971: "You're Gonna Make Me Cheat on You" / "I'll Never Let You Go" and "You Make Me Feel So Young Again" / "Take Me As I Am". In 1972, the group moved to Abbot Records and released "He's Gone", which also featured "Take Me As I Am" as the B-side.

Gwen and Doris quit the group and were replaced with male session singers. Now dubbed Barbara Blake and the Uniques on 20th Century Records, in 1974, they released "Prized Possession" / "It's Not That Easy" and "Teach Me" / "Everlasting Thrill". Both releases failed to make an impact, but still the group's eponymous LP was released in 1975. A 1975 single, "Need Your Love So Bad" / "Let Me Down Easy", also was not a chart hit.

The band broke up when their contract with 20th Century Records expired.

The Du-Ettes' regional hit song “Every Beat Of My Heart” has been featured in a Whole Foods Market television commercial.
