= Dear Kiss =

Japanese idol girl group

- Origin: Japan
- Genres: J-pop
- Years active: 2016–2024
- Labels: Fifty-Fifty Inc.
- Past members: Marie Mizuno; Nagisa Kashima; Miho Fujimoto; Miiwa Yamasaki; Rikako Saito; Saki Shishima; Nonoko; Maho Iyama; Mahiro Yamada; Kasumi Sakuraba; Ruri Hana
- Website: dearkiss.net

Dear Kiss (ディアキス) was a Japanese idol girl group that formed in 2016.

== History ==
=== 2016–2020: Formation and debut ===
Dear Kiss was formed on February 9, 2016. The initial line-up consisted of four members: Marie Mizuno, Miho Fujimoto, Miiwa Yamasaki, and Rikako Saito. Saki Shishima joined the group on April 1. They released their debut EP, Dearest Dream: First and Best Moment, on July 16. Marie Mizuno graduated from the group on August 20. They released their first single, "Shiny Shy Girl", on November 22. Nonoko joined the group on November 23. Miho Fujimoto left the group on May 4, 2017.

Their second single, "Tameiki no Sekai wa Iranai", was released on April 17, 2018. Maho Iyama joined the group on April 24.

Miiwa Yamasaki graduated from the group on February 16, 2020. Mahiro Yamada joined the group on July 11.

=== 2021–2024: Major label debut and disbandment ===
On January 24, 2021, it was announced that Dear Kiss would make their major label debut with Victor Entertainment. They released their major debut single, "Dance wa Kiss no Yōni, Kiss wa Dance no Yōni", on April 14.

Their second major single, "Happy", was released on March 16, 2022. Maho Iyama graduated from the group on December 31.

Kasumi Sakuraba and Ruri Hana joined the group on March 21, 2023. Rikako Saito graduated from the group on April 2.

Dear Kiss ended activities on November 22, 2024.

== Former members ==
- Marie Mizuno (水野真莉絵)
- Miho Fujimoto (藤本美帆)
- Miiwa Yamasaki (山崎みいわ)
- Rikako Saito (齋藤里佳子)
- Saki Shishima (四島早紀)
- Nonoko (ののこ)
- Maho Iyama (伊山摩穂)
- Mahiro Yamada (山田まひろ)
- Kasumi Sakuraba (桜庭かすみ)
- Ruri Hana (はなるり)

== Discography ==
=== Extended plays ===
List of EPS, with selected details and chart positions
Title	Details	Peak chart positions	
Title	Details	JPN	JPN Hot
Dearest Dream: First and Best Moment	Released: August 16, 2016; Label: Adding Japan; Formats: CD, digital download, streaming	15	37

=== Singles ===
List of singles, with selected chart positions, showing year released and album name
Title	Year	Peak chart positions		Album
Title	Year	JPN	JPN Hot	Album
"Shiny Shy Girl"	2016	28	95	Non-album singles
"Tameiki no Sekai wa Iranai" (ため息の世界はいらない)	2018	10	74	Non-album singles
"Dance wa Kiss no Yōni, Kiss wa Dance no Yōni" (ダンスはキスのように、キスはダンスのように)	2021	11	—	Non-album singles
"Happy" (ハッピー)	2022	16	—	Non-album singles
"—" denotes a recording that did not chart or was not released in that territory.
