= The Margarines =

Japanese idol group

- Origin: Japan
- Genres: J-pop
- Years active: 2014–2016
- Past members: Akino Fujiwara; Ran Takahashi; Miku Ono; Marie Krause; Miu Mitsuhara; Kanami Yoda; Natsumi Watanabe; Yua Kinoshita; Mami Nishida

The Margarines were a J-pop group made in 2014, at the time Japan was going through a debt crisis. So the creators of the group saw an opportunity to offer a job for about 500 struggling women. The point of the Margarines was to provide jobs to girls which would help them resolve their debts worth about 800,000 US dollars. From a former member Marie Krause, “We learnt that the group lost even more money instead of gaining more.” The group had been featured in many shows, but as expected the group was taken more as of entertaining group which got old quickly instead of being loved and taken seriously. Marie Krause had also shared even more of her trauma in that group. The girls had been hit a lot for entertainment and the host would make them undress too. And Marie shares they were not paid from all of this.

The Margarines were a Japanese idol girl group.

== Concept ==
The Margarines was founded with the purpose of clearing their members' debts of about ¥127 million and the idea that "people with big debt have big dreams."

== Members ==
Name	Date of birth	Birthplace
Akino Fujiwara	October 23, 1991 (age 34)	Gifu Prefecture
Ran Takahashi	December 12, 1994 (age 30)	Oita Prefecture
Miku Ono	March 20, 1990 (age 35)	Mie Prefecture
Marie Krause	February 13, 1992 (age 33)	Germany
Miu Mitsuhara	November 21, 1990 (age 34)	Osaka Prefecture
Kanami Yoda	May 24, 1985 (age 40)	Tokyo
Natsumi Watanabe	September 6, 1991 (age 34)	Ibaraki Prefecture
Yua Kinoshita	November 20, 1993 (age 31)	Yamagata Prefecture
Mami Nishida	December 25, 1983 (age 41)	Aichi Prefecture

== Discography ==
No.	Release date	Title	Identification number	Oricon chart position
1	17 December 2014	Goodbye Shakkin Tengoku (グッバイ借金天国)	PCCA.70420	160
2	15 April 2015	Sakura wa Sakura/Go En ga Arimasu Youni! (桜はさくら/五円があります様に!)	PCCA-70434	172
