= Flap Girls' School =

Japanese idol girl group

- Origin: Japan
- Genre: J-pop
- Label: Bellwood
- Website: flapgs.com

Flap Girls' School (フラップガールズスクール) is a Japanese idol girl group. They participated in the 2015 Tokyo Idol Festival. Their single "Biba ra Sanba" reached the 20th place on the Weekly Oricon Singles Chart.

== Discography ==
=== Albums ===
Release date	Title	Oricon (Note: Peak ranking on the weekly Oricon Albums Chart.)	Ref.
March 9, 2016	SCHOOL DAYS	60	

=== Singles ===
Release date	Title	Oricon (Note: Peak ranking on the weekly Oricon Singles Chart.)	Ref.
January 21, 2014	"Tsubomi" (つぼみ)	22	
August 5, 2014	"面舵イッパイ!"	38	
March 24, 2015	"羽ばたけ翼"	21	
August 18, 2015	"サマーデイズDANCE"	26	
August 9, 2016	"Biba ra Sanba" (ビバ・ラ・サンバ)	20	
