= Dancing Dolls =

Japanese female idol group

- Also known as: Dandol
- Origin: Osaka, Japan
- Genres: J-pop, pop
- Years active: 2012–present
- Label: Sony Music Entertainment Japan
- Members: Hono; Mii; Misaki; Miu; Kanon
- Past members: Asuka; Kyoka
- Website: dancingdolls.jp

Dancing Dolls are a Japanese female idol group. The group originally consisted of five childhood friends from Osaka: Hono (Honoka Kadomoto - 門元穂果), Mii (Misaki Nakajima - 中島弥咲), Misaki (Misaki Sakurada - 桜田美咲), and twins Asuka (Asuka Nagayama - 永山飛鳥) and Kyoka (Kyouka Nagayama - 永山杏佳).

== History ==
The group was formed in Osaka by childhood friends. They started performing in the street in Osaka Castle Park, which is a local haven for street performances. The girls wrote and composed their own songs; Misaki choreographed the dances. Dancing Dolls also began uploading dance covers to video sharing websites Nico Nico Douga and YouTube and achieved some notability there. Their videos became popular, and totaled over 10 million views by the time of their professional debut in 2012.

Dancing Dolls were signed by Sony Music Entertainment Japan and on September 12, 2012, released their debut single, titled "Touch -A.S.A.P.- / Shanghai Darling". At the time, the group's average age was 16. The single reached the 38th place in the Oricon Weekly Singles Chart. Also, the CD single was preceded by "Shanghai Darling", which was released on August 1 for digital download and peaked at the 8th spot in the daily Recochoku chart. The song "Touch -A.S.A.P-" is a cover of a theme song from the anime Touch, originally sung by Yoshimi Iwasaki and released as a single in 1985. They too made a cover of ECHO, a single by Circrush who is sung by Megpoid English, what is the English version of Megpoid.

In May 2014, the twin sisters Kyoka and Asuka left the group and Dancing Dolls became inactive for several months.

At the end of January 2015, Miu and Kanon were recruited as new Dancing Dolls members. Both girls have started dance practice and song recording. The staff of the idol group published a picture of the new members and a video in which their faces are hidden in order to keep the identities of the new members a mystery until February 14. They were officially introduced and made their debut during Dancing Dolls’ live performance on February 14 in Tokyo. At the same "time, they revealed that their new single "My Way" / "Love Me, Love Me" was scheduled to be released on March 25, 2015. This was the group's first album in 10 months with new members Miu and Kanon. The next Dancing Dolls' single features a cover of the song "Melo Melo Bakkyun" sung by Miu and Kanon.

They haven't officially disbanded, but haven't been active since 2015 and members have focused on pursuing other activities. In 2019 Mii released a solo album, HIME.

== Members ==
Name	Birth date	Age	Position
Hono	June 30, 1997	28	Vocal, dance
Mii	April 6, 1996	29	Main vocal, dance
Misaki	July 24, 1995	30	Vocal, rap, dance, choreography
Past members
Asuka	August 31, 1995	30	Dance, chorus
Kyoka	August 31, 1995	30	Dance, chorus

== Discography ==
=== Singles ===
#	Title	Release date	Charts		Track listing	Catalog nr.
#	Title	Release date	Oricon Weekly Singles Chart	Billboard Japan Hot 100	Track listing	Catalog nr.
1	"Touch -A.S.A.P.- / Shanghai Darling" (タッチ-A.S.A.P.-/上海ダーリン)	September 12, 2012	38	37	Touch -A.S.A.P.- Shanghai Darling; Melomelo Bakkyun; Touch -A.S.A.P.- (Instrumental)	SRCL-8100/1 (Limited Edition); SRCL-8102 (Regular Edition)
2	"Wangan Wonder Darling / Raspberry Love" (湾岸ワンダーダーリン/ラズベリーラブ)	January 30, 2013	32		Wangan Wonder Darling; Raspberry Love; Kyōhan no Melody; Hello	SRCL-8174/5 (Limited Edition); SRCL-8176 (Regular Edition)
3	"DD Jump" (DD JUMP)	July 24, 2013	39		DD Jump; Sunshine; Oneway Love; Friends	SRCL-8312/3 (Limited Edition); SRCL-8314 (Regular Edition)
4	"Ring Dong"	November 13, 2013	58			SRCL-8391/2 (Limited Edition); SRCL-8393 (Regular Edition)
5	"Monochrome" (monochrome)	May 21, 2014	41	86	monochrome XX; Mirai Star Road monochrome (Instrumental)	SRCL-8544/5 (Limited Edition); SRCL-8543 (Regular Edition)
6	"My Way / Love Me, Love Me"	March 25, 2015				
7	"Michi no Sekai e / Odoru Kokoro" (ミチノセカイヘ / オドルココロ)	August 26, 2015			Michi no Sekai e Odoru Kokoro; Koi no Memory	SRCL-8868/9 (Limited Edition); SRCL-8870 (Regular Edition)

== Videography ==
=== Music videos ===
Single #	Title	Official YouTube link
1	"Touch -A.S.A.P.-"	Video on YouTube (The video is available only in Japan.)
1	"Shanghai Darling"	Video on YouTube (The video is available only in Japan.)
