= N Zero =

Japanese idol girl group

- Origin: Japan
- Genres: J-pop
- Labels: kando music

N Zero (Nゼロ) is a Japanese idol girl group. Their single "Dakara Don't say it!" reached the 4th place on the Weekly Oricon Singles Chart.

== Discography ==
=== Albums ===
Release date	Title	Ref.
January 16, 2014	First 0(ラブ)	
November 10, 2015	Second 0(ラブ)	
July 18, 2018	Third 0(ラブ)	

=== Singles ===
Release date	Title	Oricon (Note: Peak ranking on the weekly Oricon Singles Chart.)	Ref.
May 4, 2011	"Daisuki da yo!" (大好きだよ!)		
November 2, 2011	"Gomenne My Way" (ごめんね☆My Way)	16	
May 2, 2012	"Junjō Satellite" (純情サテライト)	15	
November 21, 2012	"Let’s get all!"	20	
September 25, 2013	"Dogimagi First Love" (ドギマギFirst Love)	9	
May 7, 2014	"Blue Sky Blue/我らスマアホ症候群"	12	
December 31, 2014	"Dakara Don't say it!" (だから Don’t say it!)	4	
July 22, 2015	"Dakishimete my heart" (抱きしめて☆my heart)	16	
April 20, 2016	"Zenryoku Far Away" (全力★Far Away)	14	
March 15, 2017	"Doping Zero ~Seisei Doudou to Shoubu Shite~" (ドーピングゼロ～正々堂々と勝負して～)	23	
March 28, 2018	"Boku to Kimi to Hikoukigumo" (ボクとキミとヒコーキ雲)	19	
February 27, 2019	"Tokimeki♡destiny" (ときめき♡destiny)	20	
