= Clear's =

Japanese idol girl group

Clear’s
- Origin: Japan
- Genres: J-pop
- Years active: 2011–2017
- Labels: Avex
- Website: avex.jp/clears/

Clear's (stylized all uppercase) is a Japanese idol girl group. Their last three singles reached the top ten on the weekly Oricon Singles Chart, with "Yogoshitakunai cry" being their best-charting single, reaching the third place on the chart.

== Background ==
Starting in February 2011, under the catchphrase The city is not everyone's trash can! (街はみんなのごみ箱じゃない ！, Machi wa min'na no gomibako janai!), the group formed with the original name Cleaning Unit Clear's (お掃除ユニットClear's(クリアーズ), O sōji yunitto Clear's (Kuri āzu)). Nagoya Clear's (名古屋Clear's) and Kawagoe Clear's (川越Clear's) were formed later, then later still a nationwide (Japan) franchise.

Cleaning Unit Clear's made their major debut in 2014 with "Bi・Bi・Bi・Beauty!!!". They announced their move to Avex at a live concert, featuring Clear's from all over Japan, in 2016.

== Discography ==
=== Singles ===
Title	Release date	Oricon
"Ōsōji"	November 20, 2012	-
"Doremi fantastic!!!!"	December 5, 2012	-
"Bi・Bi・Bi・Beauty!!!"	September 10, 2014	8
"Yogoshitakunai cry"	March 18, 2015	3
"Kotaeshikachiranaitsurai"	October 21, 2015	4
