= Why@Doll =

Japanese female duo

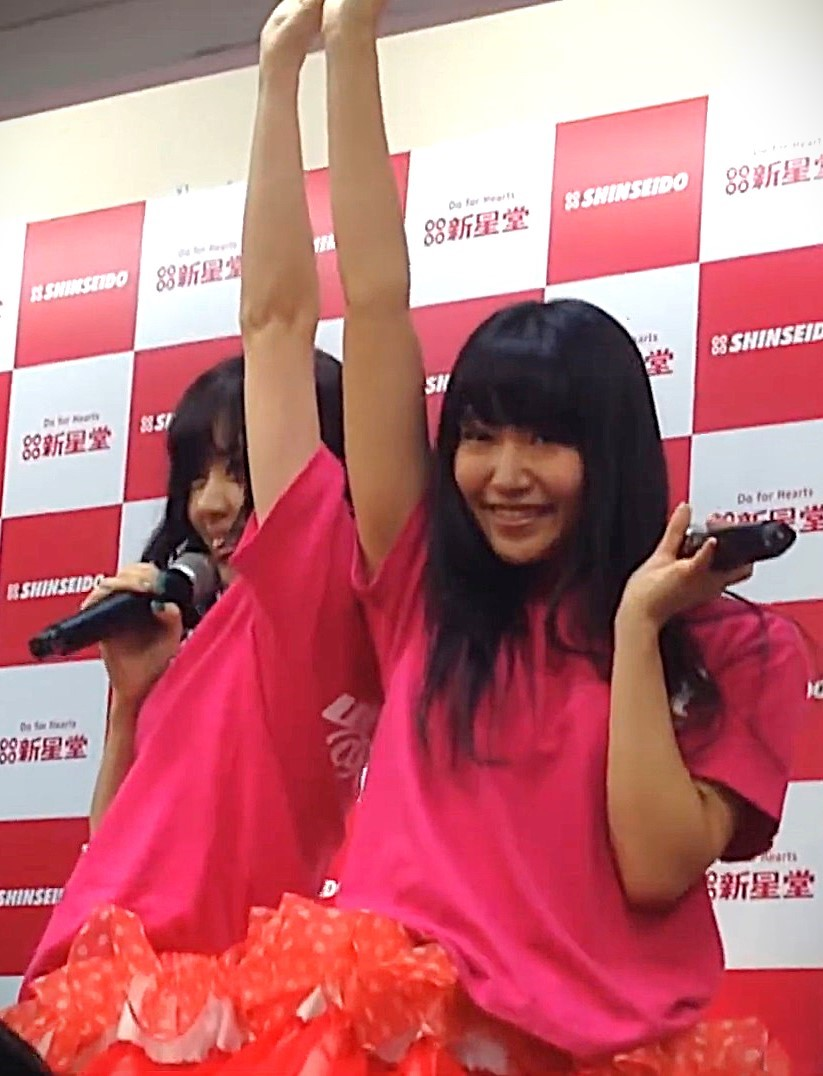
- Why@Doll in 2013

Background information
- Origin: Sapporo, Japan
- Genres: J-pop
- Years active: 2011–2019
- Labels: Version Music (2013–2016); T-Palette Records (2016–2019)
- Past members: Chiharu Aoki; Haruna Uratani; Sakurako Ōda; Yume Nagaoka; Mayana Saitō
- Website: www.whydoll.jp

Why@Doll, also known as Howadoru (ほわどる), was a Japanese female duo formed by Victor Music Arts in 2011 until their disbandment in 2019. The final line-up consisted of Chiharu Aoki and Haruna Uratani.

== History ==
Why@Doll is a play on words for "white idol": "White" comes from the image of snow Shiroishi Ward, Sapporo, where they were based. The "at" sign between the two words represents the location and the duo's hope for a friendliness with their fans.

Originally from Sapporo, Why@Doll moved to Tokyo in November 2013 and signed a contract with Version Music in 2014. The duo debuted with the single album "Magic Motion No.5" in September 2014. After releasing three singles, one mini album and one album from Version Music, Why@Doll signed a new contract with T-Palette Records in 2016.

On July 17, 2019, due to Aoki's poor health, Why@Doll announced they would disband at the end of November. They hosted their final concert at Asakusa Hana Theater on 24 November.

On August 22, 2021, the duo held a tenth anniversary concert titled "Why@Doll One Night Only Live: Open the Page of Memories" (Veats Shibuya) (Why@Doll One night only live ～思い出のページを開いて～ (Veats Shibuya), Why@Doll One night only live: Omoide no Pēji o Aite (Veats Shibuya)). It was the first time the concert was streamed, and new songs were also performed.

== Members ==
- Chiharu Aoki (青木千春, Aoki Chiharu)
- Haruna Uratani (浦谷はるな, Uratani Haruna)

== Discography ==
=== Singles ===
No.	Title	Track listing	Release date	Label	Peak chart position (Oricon)	Notes
1	"Fight"	1. "Fight!"; 2. "Tabidachi" (旅立ち; Trip); 3. "Fight! (off vocal ver.)" 4. "Tabidachi" (旅立ち; Trip) (off vocal ver.)	December 27, 2012	Cradle Records (CRC0007)		
2	"Yumemiru Tsubasa" (ユメミルツバサ)	1. "Yumemiru Tsubasa" (ユメミルツバサ); 2. "Zutto Motto" (ずっと もっと); 3. "Yumemiru Tsubasa" (ユメミルツバサ) (off vocal ver.); 4. "Zutto Motto" (ずっと もっと) (off vocal ver.)	December 27, 2012	Cradle Records (CRC0006)		
3	"Fuwa-fuwa Party" (ふわふわ♪Party)	1. "Fuwa-fuwa Party" (ふわふわ♪Party); 2. "Kimi ni Aitai" (君に逢いたい); 3. "Seishun Chime" (青春チャイム, Seishun Kuraimu); 4. "Fuwa-fuwa Party" (ふわふわ♪Party) (off vocal ver.); 5. "Kimi ni Aitai" (君に逢いたい) (off vocal ver.); 6. "Seishun Chime" (青春チャイム, Seishun Kuraimu) (off vocal ver.)	August 20, 2013	Cradle Records (CRC0008)	24	
4	"Sunrise! Kimi ga Kureta Kibō" (サンライズ！〜君がくれた希望〜, Sanraisu! Kimi ga Kureta Kibō)	1. "Sunrise! Kimi ga Kureta Kibō" (サンライズ！〜君がくれた希望〜, Sanraisu! Kimi ga Kureta Kibō); 2. "Hatsukoi Killer Tune" (初恋☆キラーチューン, Hatsukoi Kirā Chūn); 3. "Sunrise! Kimi ga Kureta Kibō" (サンライズ！〜君がくれた希望〜, Sanraisu! Kimi ga Kureta Kibō) (instrumental); 4. "Hatsukoi Killer Tune" (初恋☆キラーチューン, Hatsukoi Kirā Chūn) (instrumental)	January 21, 2014	ACUTEDISC (VBCL-1001)	10	
4	"Sunrise! Kimi ga Kureta Kibō" (サンライズ！〜君がくれた希望〜, Sanraisu! Kimi ga Kureta Kibō)	Chiharun ver: 1. "Sunrise! Kimi ga Kureta Kibō" (サンライズ！〜君がくれた希望〜, Sanraisu! Kimi ga Kureta Kibō); 2. "Hatsukoi Killer Tune" (初恋☆キラーチューン, Hatsukoi Kirā Chūn); 3. "Sunrise! Kimi ga Kureta Kibō" (サンライズ！〜君がくれた希望〜, Sanraisu! Kimi ga Kureta Kibō) (instrumental); 4. "Hatsukoi Killer Tune" (初恋☆キラーチューン, Hatsukoi Kirā Chūn) (instrumental); 5. "Sunrise! Kimi ga Kureta Kibō" (サンライズ！〜君がくれた希望〜, Sanraisu! Kimi ga Kureta Kibō) (Chiharun ver.)	January 21, 2014	ACUTEDISC (VBCL-1002)	10	
4	"Sunrise! Kimi ga Kureta Kibō" (サンライズ！〜君がくれた希望〜, Sanraisu! Kimi ga Kureta Kibō)	Hāchan ver: 1. "Sunrise! Kimi ga Kureta Kibō" (サンライズ！〜君がくれた希望〜, Sanraisu! Kimi ga Kureta Kibō); 2. "Hatsukoi Killer Tune" (初恋☆キラーチューン, Hatsukoi Kirā Chūn); 3. "Sunrise! Kimi ga Kureta Kibō" (サンライズ！〜君がくれた希望〜, Sanraisu! Kimi ga Kureta Kibō) (instrumental); 4. "Hatsukoi Killer Tune" (初恋☆キラーチューン, Hatsukoi Kirā Chūn) (instrumental); 5. "Sunrise! Kimi ga Kureta Kibō" (サンライズ！〜君がくれた希望〜, Sanraisu! Kimi ga Kureta Kibō) (Hāchan ver.)	January 21, 2014	ACUTEDISC (VBCL-1003)	10	
5	Magic Motion No.5	【regular】: 1. "Magic Motion No.5"; 2. "Himawari" (向日葵) (instrumental); 3. "Magic Motion No.5"; 4. "Himawari" (向日葵) (instrumental)	September 24, 2014	Version Music (VICL-36956)	13	
5	Magic Motion No.5	Hāchan ver.: 1. "Magic Motion No.5"; 2. "Jet Coaster" (ジェットコースター, Jetto Kōsutā); 3. "Himawari" (向日葵) (Hāchan ver.); 4. "Magic Motion No.5" (instrumental); 5. "Jet Coaster" (ジェットコースター, Jetto Kōsutā) (instrumental); 6. "Himawari" (向日葵) (instrumental)	September 24, 2014	Version Music (VICL-36957)	13	
5	Magic Motion No.5	Chirarun ver.: 1. "Magic Motion No.5"; 2. "Jet Coaster" (ジェットコースター, Jetto Kōsutā); 3. "Himawari" (向日葵) (Chiharun ver.); 4. "Magic Motion No.5" (instrumental); 5. "Jet Coaster" (ジェットコースター, Jetto Kōsutā) (instrumental); 6. "Himawari" (向日葵) (instrumental)	September 24, 2014	Version Music (VICL-36958)	13	
5	Magic Motion No.5	(Eisaku Kubonouchi (album cover art) ver.): 1. "Magic Motion No.5"; 2. "Jet Coaster"; 3. "Travellin' Band"; 4. "Magic Motion No.5" (Instrumental); 5. "Jet Coaster" (Instrumental); 6. "Travellin' Band" (Instrumental)	September 24, 2014	Version Music (VICL-36959)	13	
5	Magic Motion No.5	Musha Shugyo ver.: 1. "Magic Motion No.5"; 2. "Travelin' Band"; 3. "Arigatō." (ありがとう。) (Live ver.); 4. "Himawari" (向日葵) (Live ver.); 5. "Magic Motion No.5"; 6. "Travelin' Band"	September 24, 2014	Version Music (VICL-36960)	13	
6	Aimai Moon (曖昧MOON)	Regular: 1. "Aimai Moon" (曖昧MOON); 2. "Signal" (シグナル, Shigunaru); 3. "Aimai Moon" (曖昧MOON) (instrumental); 4. "Signal" (シグナル, Shigunaru) (instrumental)	March 18, 2015	Version Music (VICL-37033)	22	
6	Aimai Moon (曖昧MOON)	Chiharun and Hāchan ver.: 1. "Aimai Moon" (曖昧MOON); 2. "Signal" (シグナル, Shigunaru); 3. "Arigatō." (ありがとう。); 4. "Aimai Moon" (曖昧MOON) (instrumental); 5. "Signal" (シグナル, Shigunaru) (instrumental); 6. "Arigatō." (ありがとう。) (instrumental)	March 18, 2015	Chiharun ver. Version Music (VICL-37034)	22	
6	Aimai Moon (曖昧MOON)	Chiharun and Hāchan ver.: 1. "Aimai Moon" (曖昧MOON); 2. "Signal" (シグナル, Shigunaru); 3. "Arigatō." (ありがとう。); 4. "Aimai Moon" (曖昧MOON) (instrumental); 5. "Signal" (シグナル, Shigunaru) (instrumental); 6. "Arigatō." (ありがとう。) (instrumental)	March 18, 2015	Hāchan ver. Version Music (VICL-37035)	22	
7	clover	1. "Clover"; 2. "Ringing Bells"; "Vector"	December 9, 2015	Version Music (VICL-37120)	20	
8	Sumire Iolite (菫アイオライト, Sumire Ioraito)	1. "Sumire Iolite" (菫アイオライト, Sumire Ioraito); 2. "Anata Dake Konban wa" (あなただけ今晩は); 3. "Sumire Iolite" (菫アイオライト, Sumire Ioraito) (instrumental); 4. "Anata Dake Konban wa" (あなただけ今晩は) (instrumental)	November 15, 2016	T-Palette Records (TPRC-0161)	29	
9	Kimi wa Steady (キミはSteady)	1. "Kimi wa Steady" (キミはSteady; lit. You Are Steady); 2. "Love Story wa Shũmatsu ni" (ラブ・ストーリーは週末に, Rabu Sutōrī wa Shūmatsu ni; lit. Love Story of the Weekend); 3. "Kimi wa Steady" (キミはSteady; lit. You Are Steady) (instrumental); 4. "Love Story wa Shũmatsu ni" (ラブ・ストーリーは週末に, Rabu Sutōrī wa Shūmatsu ni; lit. Love Story of the Weekend) (instrumental)	February 28, 2017	T-Palette Records (TPRC-0172)	43	
10	Show Me Your Smile	1. "Show Me Your Smile"; 2. "Promises, Promises"; 3. "Show Me Your Smile" (instrumental); 4. "Promises, Promises" (instrumental)	January 23, 2018	T-Palette Records (TPRC-0194)	31	
11	Sweet Vinegar	1. "Sweet Vinegar"; 2. "Don't Ask Me Why"; 3. "Sweet Vinegar" (instrumental); 4. "Don't Ask Me Why" (instrumental)	June 26, 2018	T-Palette Records (TPRC-0203)	29	

=== Mini Album ===
Title	Track listing	Release date	Label	Peak chart position (Oricon)	Notes
Namara!!	1. "Namara!!"; 2. "Vanilla Shake"; 3. "Nigatsu no Epilogue" (２月のエピローグ, Nigatsu no Epirōgu); 4. "Jet Coaster"; 5. "Himawari" (向日葵); 6. "Powder Snow"; 7. "Magic Motion No. 5"; 8. "Namara!! (Reprise)"	February 25, 2015	Version Music (VICL-64309)	69	

=== Albums ===
No.	Title	Track listing	Release date	Label	Peak chart position (Oricon)	Notes
1	Gemini	1. "Gemini"; 2. "Game"; 3. "Ringing Bells"; 4. "Signal"; 5. "Tactics"; 6. "Vector"; 7. "Shu-shu-star"; 8. "Aimai Moon" (曖昧); 9. "Setsuna Shooting Star"; 10. "Arigatō." (ありがとう。); 11. "Byōsoku Party Night" (秒速 Party Night); 12. "Candy Love"; 13. "Clover"; 14. "Lovers on Earth"	February 10, 2016	Version Music (VICL-64504)	46	
2	Why@Doll	1. "Sumire Iolite" (菫アイオライト, Sumire Ioraito); 2. "Kimi wa Steady" (キミはSteady); 3. "Tokyo Dancing"; 4. "Koi Nano kana?" (恋なのかな？); 5. "Mahō no Kagami" (マホウノカガミ); 6. "Wasurenaide" (忘れないで); 7. "Dreamin' Night"; 8. "Yoru o Oyoide" (夜を泳いで); 9. "Hello Hello Hello"; 10. "Koi wa Shooby Doo Bop!" (恋はシュビドゥバ!, Koi wa Shubiduba!)	August 1, 2017	T-Palette Records (TPRC-0176)	66	
