= Bakusute Sotokanda Icchome =

Japanese idol girl group

Sotokanda Icchome
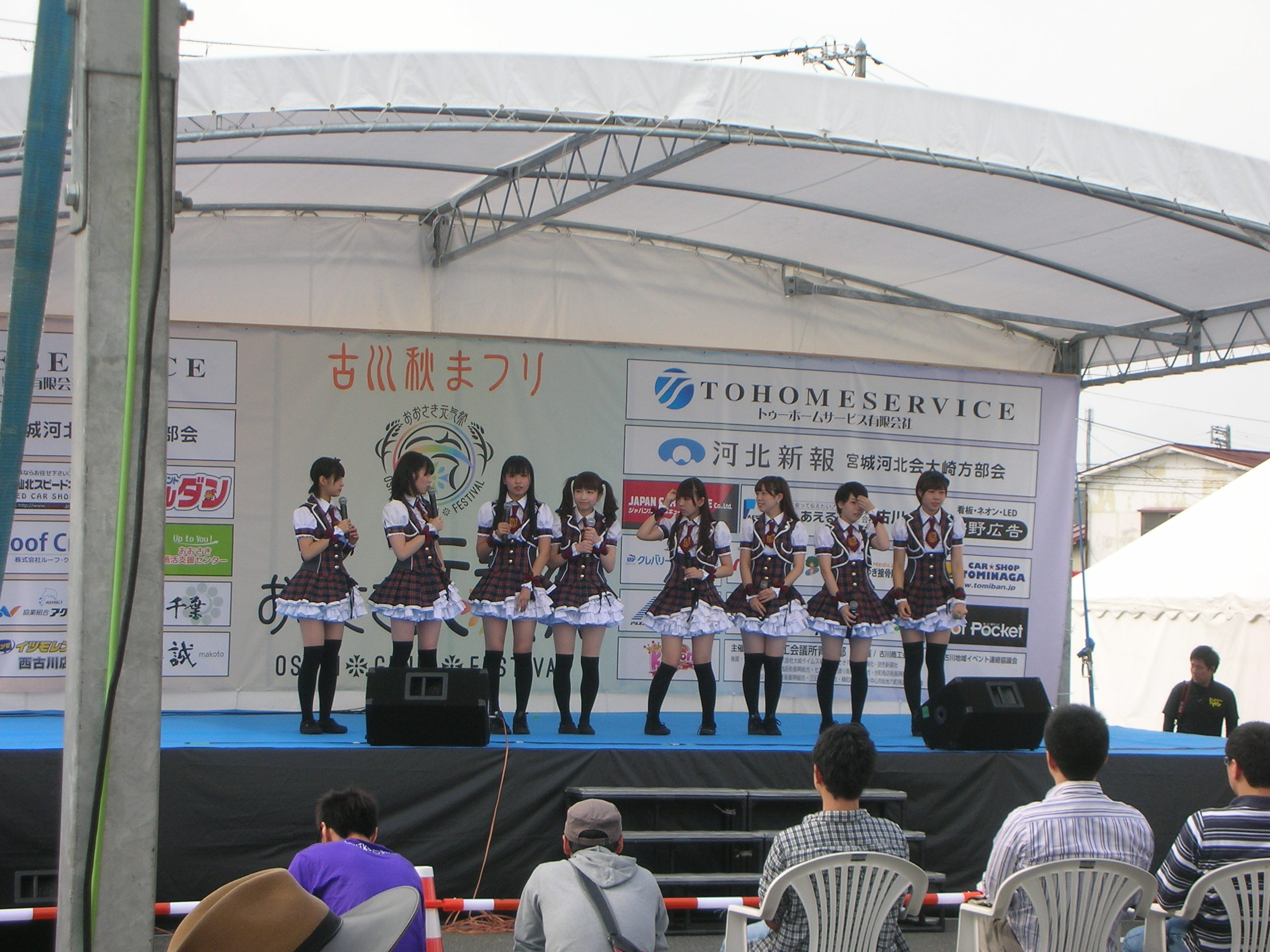
- Sotokanda Icchome

Background information
- Also known as: Bakusute Sotokanda Icchome (2011-2022)
- Origin: Japan
- Years active: 2011–January 2024
- Labels: Le:iDIX Records; Warner Music Japan
- Members: Yuri Asakura; Shiho Kanzaki; Azuki Moeno; Hitomi Motoki; Nagisa A.D. Sanada Yoshi; Aika Nishi
- Past members: Yumi Masuda; Arisa Hario; Fuka Matsumoto; Kurumi Kawai; Aiko Hamaguchi; Mai Hirosawa

Sotokanda Icchome (外神田いっちょめ), formerly known as Bakusute Sotokanda Icchome (バクステ外神田一丁目), is a Japanese idol girl group established in December 2011. Their singles "Baitofaitaa" and "Otomegokoro no kagi/The kagayakeru" reached the third place on the weekly Oricon Singles Chart.

== Discography ==
=== Albums ===
Title	Release date	Oricon
1 Za Purodyuusu	January 29, 2014	18

=== Singles ===
Title	Release date	Oricon
"Purodyuusu"	August 1, 2012	17
"Yoropiku Pikuyoro!"	January 30, 2013	8
"Baitofaitaa"	May 8, 2013	3
"Bishōjo Mokushiroku"	August 14, 2013	6
"Oh my destiny"	November 20, 2013	11
"Seishun Chronicle/Harinezumi to jeriibii"	August 27, 2014	10
"Doki Doki Crazy Dancing"	April 29, 2015	151
"Amai Yūwaku Dangerous"	August 12, 2015	8
"Otomegokoro no kagi/The kagayakeru"	February 17, 2016	3
"Kyouhansha"	June 4, 2019	13
