= Anna S =

Japanese girl group

Anna S (styled ANNA☆S) is a Japanese girl group. Their single "命短し走れよ乙女/くるくるりん" reached the eleventh place on the Oricon Weekly Singles Chart.

== Discography ==
=== Singles ===
Release date	Title	Oricon	Ref.
October 3, 2012	"Koiyohō" (恋予報)	79	
May 15, 2013	"Su And You"	33	
September 24, 2013	"Datte LOVE ME TO" (だって LOVE ME DO)	21	
May 6, 2014	"人生!本気(マジ)もったいないよ!"	13	
July 1, 2015	"命短し走れよ乙女/くるくるりん"	11	
August 14, 2015	"Ka・wa☆i・i" (カ・ワ☆イ・イ)	-	
December 22, 2015	"FuwafuWonder Girl/JUSTren'aiMODE" (ふわふWonder Girl/JUST恋愛MODE)	20	
