= Ua discography =

- Studio albums: 10
- Extended plays: 2
- Live albums: 4
- Compilation albums: 3
- Singles: 19
- Video albums: 8
- Side projects: 2

The discography of Japanese singer songwriter Ua consists of ten studio albums, four live albums, three compilation albums, two collaboration albums, two extended plays, nineteen singles and four video albums.

== Discography ==
=== Studio albums ===
Year	Album details	Peak chart positions	Sales
1996	11: Released: October 23, 1996; Label: Speedstar Records; Formats: CD, 2LP, cassette	3	814,890
1998	Ametora: Released: April 22, 1998; Label: Speedstar Records; Formats: CD, 2LP, cassette	2	434,930
1999	Turbo: Released: October 27, 1999; Label: Speedstar Records; Formats: CD, 2LP, cassette	6	165,730
2002	Dorobō: Released: September 19, 2002; Label: Speedstar Records; Formats: CD, LP, cassette	14	48,130
2004	Sun: Released: March 24, 2004; Label: Speedstar Records; Formats: CD, 2LP, DVD-A	26	28,318
2005	Breathe: Released: March 30, 2005; Label: Speedstar Records; Formats: CD, LP	44	13,742
2007	Golden Green: Released: June 20, 2007; Label: Speedstar Records; Formats: CD, 2LP, digital download	21	21,175
2009	Atta: Released: July 22, 2009; Label: Speedstar Records; Formats: CD, LP, digital download	39	7,762
2015	JaPo: Released: May 20, 2016; Label: Speedstar Records; Formats: CD, LP, digital download	57	-
2026	Newme: Released: February 18, 2026; Label: Victor Entertainment; Formats: CD, digital download	32	1,299

=== Live albums ===
Year	Album details	Peak chart positions	Sales
1997	Fine Feathers Make Fine Birds: Released: April 23, 1997; Label: Speedstar Records; Formats: 2CD, 2LP	7	298,080
2003	Sora no Koya: Released: April 23, 2003; Label: Speedstar Records; Formats: 2CD	58	10,467
2004	La: Released: October 20, 2004; Label: Speedstar Records; Formats: CD	88	3,624
2010	Haluto Live: Released: April 7, 2010; Label: Speedstar Records; Formats: CD	84	2,137

=== Compilation albums ===
Year	Album details	Peak chart positions	Sales
2003	Illuminate: The Very Best Songs: Released: September 17, 2003; Label: Speedstar Records; Formats: 2CD, cassette	4	226,242
2005	Nephews: Released: October 26, 2005; Label: Speedstar Records; Formats: 2CD, DVD-A, digital download	42	11,680
2007	iTunes Originals – UA: Released: August 29, 2007; Label: Speedstar Records; Formats: Digital download	—	—

=== Side projects ===
Year	Album details	Peak chart positions	Sales
2004	Utauua: Released: March 13, 2004; Label: Speedstar Records; Formats: 2CD	51	28,291
2006	Cure Jazz: Released: July 19, 2006; Label: Speedstar Records; Formats: CD, digital download	22	—

=== Extended plays ===
Year	EP details	Peak chart positions	Sales
1995	Petit: Released: October 21, 1995; Label: Speedstar; Formats: CD, 12" vinyl	—	—
2022	Are U Romantic?: Released: May 25, 2022; Label: Speedstar; Formats: CD, digital download	33	—

=== Singles ===
Release	Title	Oricon Singles Charts					Album
Release	Title	Peak Positions			Sales		Album
Release	Title	Daily	Weekly	Yearly	Debut	Overall	Album
1995	"Horizon"	—	—	—	—	—	Petit
1995	"Colony"	—	—	—	—	—	
1996	"Taiyō Te ni Tsuki wa Kokoro no Ryōte ni"	—	99	—	3,040	6,020	Petit
1996	"Jōnetsu"	—	18	—	5,700	236,510	11
1996	"Rhythm"	—	20	—	17,800	63,180	11
1996	"Kumo ga Chigireru Toki"	—	73	—	5,920	10,520	11
1997	"Amai Unmei"	—	10	94	43,920	327,070	
1997	"Kanashimi Johnny"	—	11	—	60,740	210,270	Ametora
1998	"Milk Tea"	—	21	—	21,690	61,200	Ametora
1998	"Yuganda Taiyō"	—	77	—	4,520	4,520	Ametora
1998	"Kazoe Tarinai Yoru no Ashioto"	—	29	—	15,940	59,260	Turbo
1999	"Skirt no Suna"	—	18	—	26,880	54,410	Turbo
1999	"Private Surfer"	—	23	—	14,110	28,250	Turbo
2002	"Senkō"	—	18	—	10,230	17,230	Dorobō
2002	"Dorobon"	—	90	—	1,447	1,447	Dorobō
2004	"Lightning"	—	84	—	1,790	2,447	Sun
2004	"Odoru Tori to Kin no Ame"	—	—	—	—	—	Sun
2007	"Ōgon no Midori/Love Scene"	—	65	—	1,774	3,632	Golden Green
2008	"2008"	—	116	—	719	719	Atta
2022	"Binetsu"	—	—	—	—	—	Are U Romantic?
2022	"Aiwo"	—	—	—	—	—	Are U Romantic?
Top 20 songs		—	6	—			

== Video releases ==
=== Video/live albums ===
- 1998: Ametora '98
- 2003: Sora no Koya
- 2003: Illuminate: The Very Best Clips
- 2004: Do Re Mi no TV Vol.1
- 2004: Do Re Mi no TV Vol.2
- 2004: Do Re Mi no TV Vol.3
- 2004: Do Re Mi no TV Vol.4
- 2004: Do Re Mi no TV Vol.5
