= Live Earth concert, Kyoto =

Concert event

Live Earth
- Dates: July 7, 2007
- Locations: Tō-ji, Kyoto, Japan
- Years active: 2007
- Founders: Al Gore, Kevin Wall
- Website: Live Earth Japan Site

One of the Live Earth concerts in Japan was held at Tō-ji, Kyoto on 7 July 2007.

== Running order ==
- Rip Slyme - "One (CHRISTMAS CLASSIC VERSION)", "Nettaiya (Tropical Night)", "Rakuen Baby (Paradise Baby)", "Unmei Kyodotai (Unity of Fate)" (K 03:06)
- UA - "Tori (Bird)", "Moor" (K 04:06))
- Bonnie Pink - "Heaven's Kitchen", "Chances Are", "Souldiers", "Water Me" (K 05:06)
- Michael Nyman - "Franklyn", "Big My Secret", "Silver Fingered Fling", "If", "The Departure", "Jack" (K 06:06)
- Yellow Magic Orchestra - "Ishindenshin", "Rescue", "War and Peace", "Rydeen" (K 07:06)

== Coverage ==
MSN held the online broadcasting of the concert.
