= Kōrokan =

Heian and earlier period foreign guest houses in Japan

Tsukushi Kōrokan
- 筑紫の鴻臚館 (Japanese)
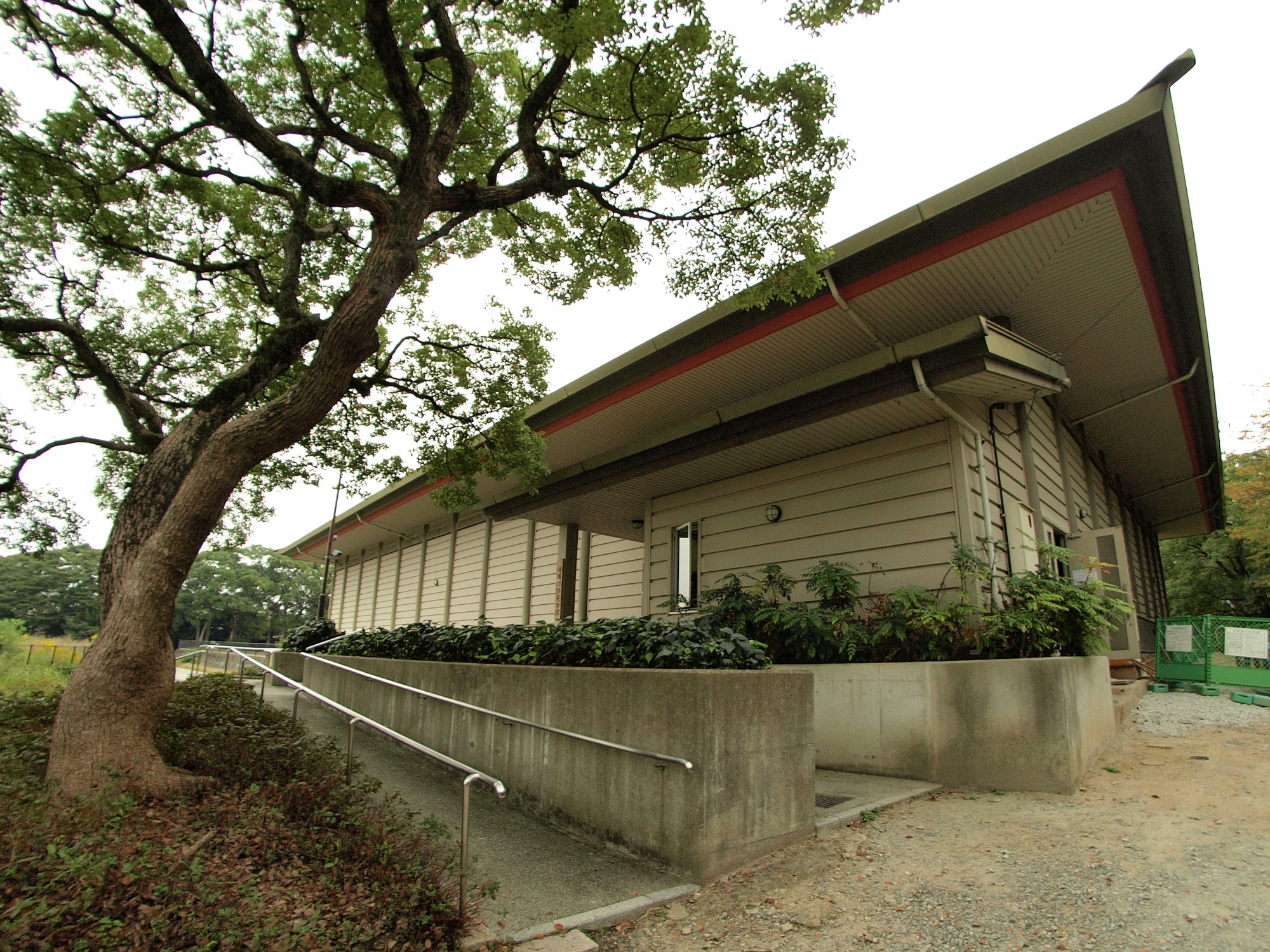
- Fukuoka Kōrokan Museum

- Tsukushi Kōrokan Kōrokan (Japan)
- Interactive map of Tsukushi Kōrokan
- 33°35′09″N 130°23′09″E
- Periods: Nara – Heian period
- Location: Hakata-ku, Fukuoka, Japan
- Region: Kyushu

The kōrokan (鴻臚館) were guest houses for foreign ambassadors, traveling monks, and merchants that existed in Japan from the Asuka period to the end of the Heian period. These guest houses existed in Fukuoka, Osaka and Kyoto. The word kōrokan (鴻臚館) was coined in the Heian period by using the first two characters from the Chinese name 鴻臚寺(zh) for Han dynasty and Northern Qi dynasty temples charged with the responsibility of hosting foreign dignitaries. The ruins of the kōrokan in Fukuoka were discovered on the grounds of Maizuru Castle Park in 1987 and designated a National Historic Site in 2004. The guest house in Fukuoka is called Tsukushi Kōrokan (筑紫の鴻臚館), after the name of Tsukushi Province, which is part of Fukuoka Prefecture today

== Tsukushi Kōrokan ==
After the Iwai Rebellion (527–528), in the first year of Senka (536), a regional capital was established over Kyushu and was commonly known as "Nanotsu no Miyake". In 609, this is mentioned in the Nihon Shoki under the name "Tsukushi no Ohomikoto Mochi no Tsukasa". The year after the Battle of Hakusukinoe (664), administrative functions were moved inland to Dazaifu, and the former site on the banks of the Natsu river remained as base for overseas exchange and national defense. This facility was called "Tsukushi no Murotsumi" (and later called the "Kōrokan"), and it functioned as a guest house and lodging facility to welcome envoys from Tang China, Silla, and Balhae. Overseas envoys first entered the "Kōrokan" before heading to Dazaifu and onward to the capital at Asuka (and later Heijō-kyō). The distance between the "Kōrokan" and Dazaifu is about 16 kilometers, and a straight road complete with gutters with a maximum width of 10 meters was constructed to connect the two. However, this road was abandoned by the 8th century. It is recorded in the Nihon Shoki that that Prince Kim Sang-nim of Silla was hosted here in 688. The "Korokan" was also used as an official lodging facility for Japanese missions to Tang China and monks studying abroad. A poem composed at "Kōrokan" by the envoy to Silla in 736 is included in the Man'yōshū. Under the Ritsuryō system, the Kōrokan was under the jurisdiction of the Ministry of Ceremonies and was also used for inspections, entertainment, and trading with foreign merchants.

The name "Kōrokan" appears for the first time in 837 in the "Record of Pilgrimage to the Tang Dynasty" written by Ennin, a monk who studied abroad in the Tang dynasty. This is first reference to the guest house using its Heian name in the historical record. It is said that in 838, Ono no Takamura, deputy envoy of the 19th embassy to China, recited a poem with the Dazaifu Kōrokan, and in 842, and in 849, the visit of 53 Chinese merchants was reported from Dazaifu to the Imperial Court. In (858), Enchin, a monk who studied abroad, returned to Japan on a ship run by the merchant Li Yanxiao, and the "Onjo-ji Temple Documents" states that a welcoming banquet was held at the gate tower of the north building of Kōrokan. In 861 and 865, Li Yanxiao visited Kōrokan again; however, Sugawara Michizane abolished the Japanese missions to Tang China in 894.

Initially, trade at Kōrokan was government-run. Dazaifu was notified of the arrival of the merchant ship, and a courier was sent from Dazaifu to the Imperial Court. Officials called Karamonozukai were then dispatched from the imperial court, and they prioritized the purchase of sutra scrolls, Buddhist statues, Buddhist utensils, medicines, spices, and other products requested by the imperial court and aristocrats. The remaining products were purchased by local powerful families and influential temples and shrines. Merchants stayed at Kōrokan for three to six months from the time they arrived until the time they began trading. Lodging and meals were provided by Kōrokan. Later, in regulations issued in 903, trade was strictly prohibited before purchase by the imperial court, indicating that trade was shifting from government to private management. Then, in 909, Dazaifu officials were assigned to handle trade matters instead of the envoys from the capital. After the Toi invasion in 1019, the site was fortified. Trade continued with merchants from the Northern Song dynasty, Goryeo, and Liao dynasty, but in the 11th century, direct trade became active among influential temples and shrines as well as by powerful aristocrats. The coast from present-day Hakata to Hakozaki became the center of trade, and trade at Kōrokan, which had changed its name to the "Great Song Dynasty Merchant and Guest House", declined. It burned down in 1047, and disappears from literature soon afterwards. The last reference in the historical record tells us that the Song merchant Li Jujian (李居簡) copied a sutra there in 1091.

During the Edo period, Fukuoka Domain scholars theorized that the Kōrokan was located in Kannai-chō in Hakata (near present-day Nakagofuku-chō, Hakata-ku, Fukuoka), and this theory persisted into the Taishō period. However, Nakayama Heijirō, a professor at Kyushu Imperial University, proposed that the site was actually under Fukuoka Castle after examining the descriptions in the Man'yōshū. At the time, the 24th Imperial Japanese Army Infantry Regiment was stationed at Fukuoka Castle, but in 1915, on a rare "open house" day, Nakayama surveyed the barracks and collected ancient roof tiles. He published a paper in the Archaeological Journal in 1926–1927. A military officer in the same regiment, Kagamiyama Takeshi, also collected fragments of ancient roof tiles while guarding an ammunition depot, and the two later founded the Kyushu Archaeological Society in 1930. After World War II, in 1948, a stadium for the National Athletic Meet was constructed on the site of the former 24th Infantry Regiment barracks, and the following year, in 1949, the Heiwadai Baseball Stadium was constructed. During this construction work a large amount of roof tiles and Chinese celadon shards, as well as foundation stones were excavated, but no official archaeological excavations were carried out, and the ruins were thought to have been destroyed. However, when renovation work was carried out in 1957, 3000 more pottery shards were unearthed. In 1987, during an excavation survey carried out to repair the stadium's outfield seats, parts of the structure that had been thought to have been destroyed were discovered in good condition, raising the possibility that the remaining structures might still exist as well. The stadium closed in 1997, and full-scale excavation work began in 1999, when the stands and other buildings were dismantled, and continues to this day, and in May 2004 it was designated as a national historic site.

Wooden tablets and tiles were unearthed during excavations. Other unearthed items include Shaoxing kiln celadon, Changsha kiln porcelain, Jingzhou kiln white porcelain, pottery from Silla and Goryeo, blue-glazed pottery from the Islamic world, and Persian glass. It was also revealed that the buildings were divided into five periods over time. However, the remains of the 4th period from the late 9th century and the 5th period from the late 10th century to the early 11th century were destroyed by the construction of Fukuoka Castle. Analysis of parasite eggs in the remains of toilets from the Nara period revealed that the toilets of foreigners who regularly ate pigs and wild boars and the Japanese people had separate toilets. Furthermore, it has been revealed that the toilets were separated by gender, and that sticks called chuugi were used for toilet paper.

In 1995, the Kōrokan Ruins Exhibition Hall was built on the south side of the ruins after the excavation survey was completed, and the discovered ruins and excavated artifacts are on display. In the spring of 2016, the remains were backfilled and opened to the public as a lawn plaza. There is a mark indicating the site of the building.

The site is a 10-minute walk from Akasaka Station on the Fukuoka City Subway Airport Line.

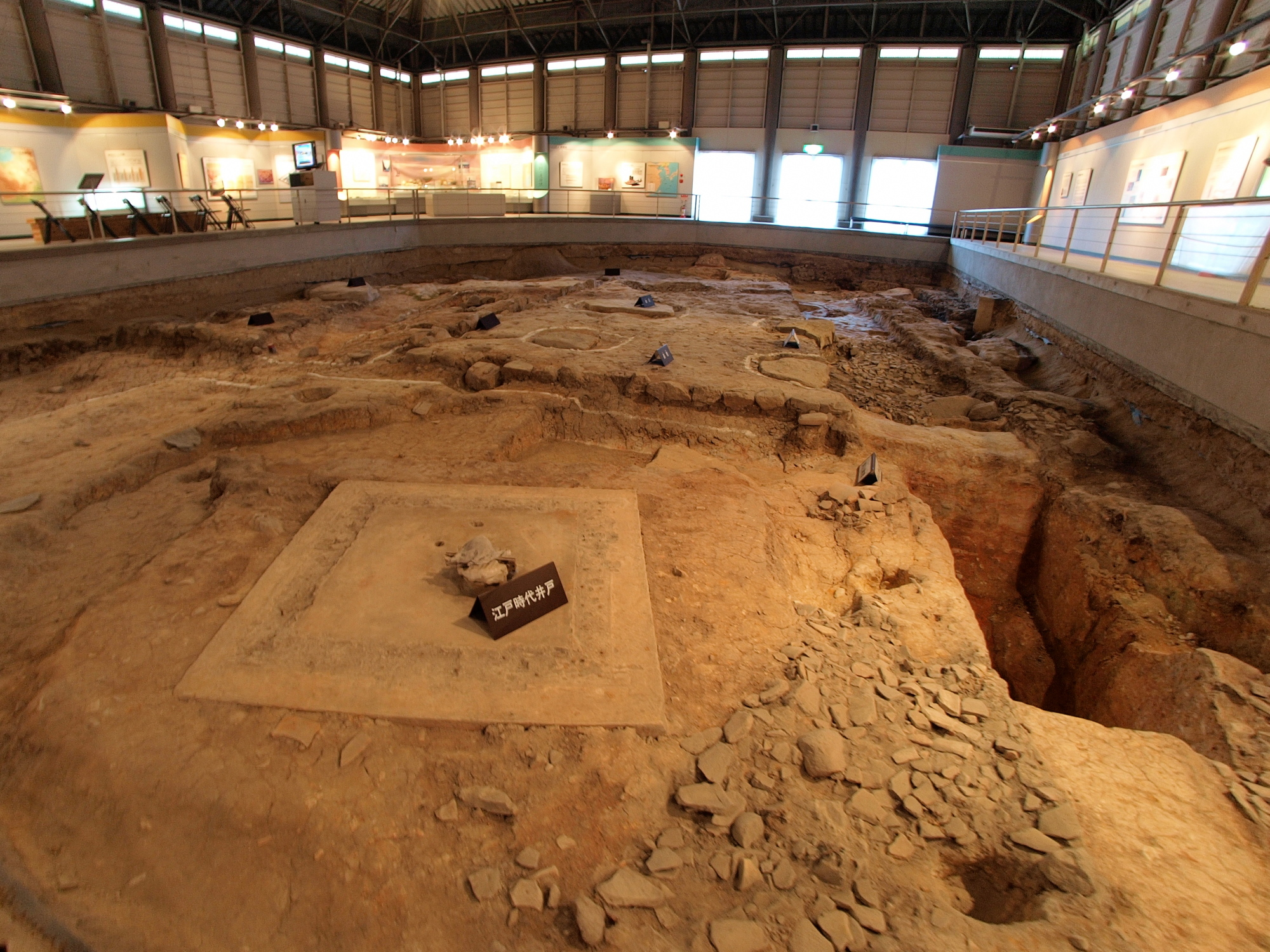
Tsukushi Kōrokan ruins

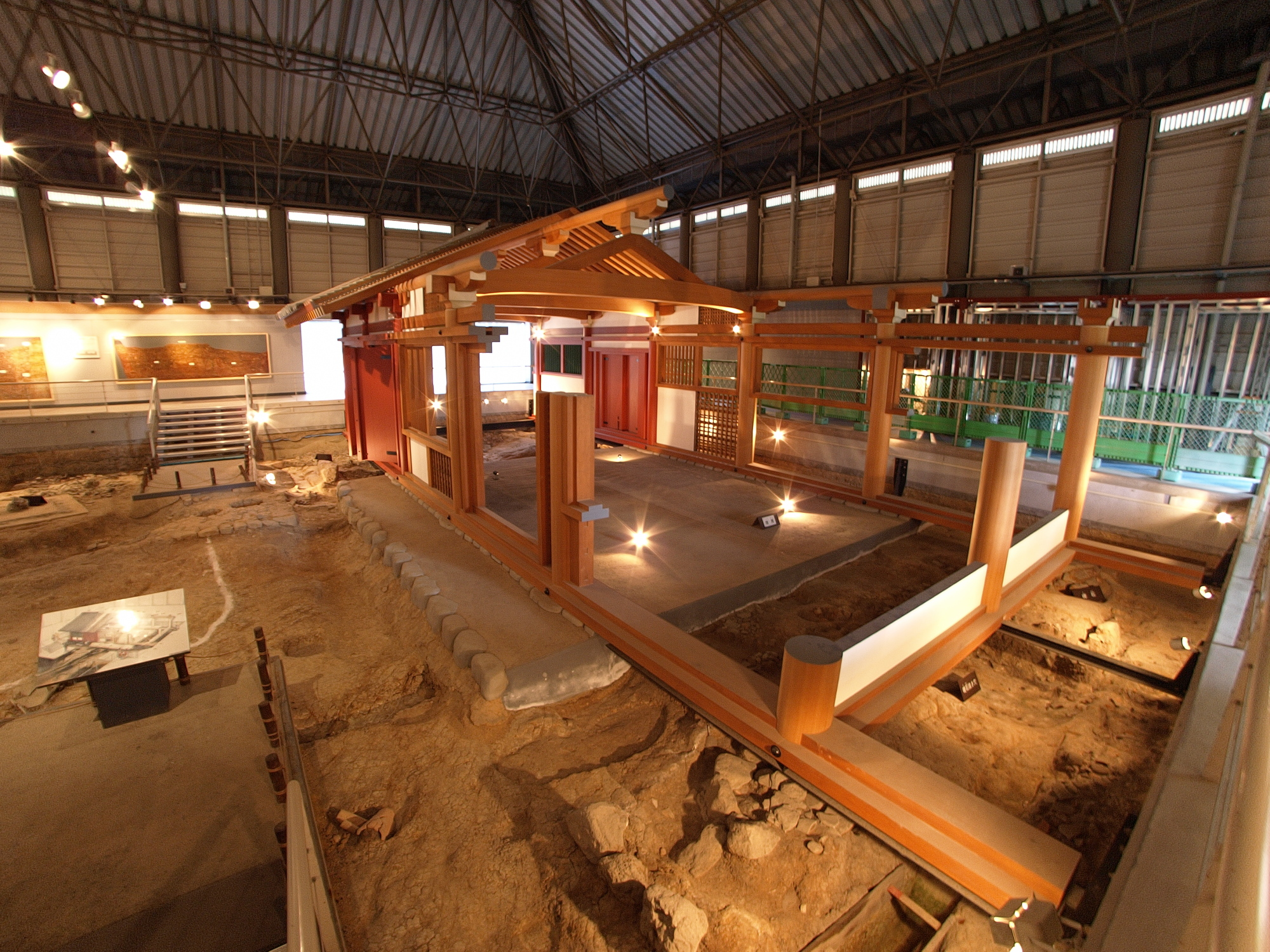
Tsukushi Kōrokan partial reconstruction

== Naniwa Kōrokan (Osaka) ==
The Osaka kōrokan was located in Namba-tsu (Watanabe-tsu), the ancient port of the Yamato Kingdom since the Kofun period. The exact location is thought to have been between Tenmabashi and Tenjinbashi bridges between Chuo-ku and Kita-ku in present-day Osaka City. Ancient documents, such as the Nihon Shoki state that a "Naniwa no Murotsumi" was located at the port as a diplomatic facility, and it was here that envoys from King Muryeong of Baekje stayed in 512 AD. In 561, delegations from Baekje and Silla were lodged and entertained at this location. In April 608, Pei Shiqing, an envoy of Emperor Yang of Sui was welcomed by the Imperial Court at this location, thus marking the start of diplomatic relations between Japan and China. In May 660, a diplomatic mission from Goguryeo visited the Naniwa Kōrokan. Per the Shoku Nihon Kōki the facility was shut down in 844 and its function taken over by the government office of Settsu Province.

== Heian-kyō Kōrokan (Kyoto) ==
When the imperial capital moved to Heian-kyō, modern day Kyoto, in 794, a kōrokan was initially built on both sides of the Rajōmon the south gate of the city. In the Kōnin era (810–824) it was removed due to the construction of the great temples of Tō-ji and Sai-ji, and replaced by an east guest house on Shichijō, southeast of what is now Tambaguchi Station in Shimogyō-ku, Kyoto. Emissaries from Balhae were the most frequent guests. However, during the reign of King Seon of Balhae, relations with Japan deteriorated. In 824, the Udaijin Fujiwara no Otsugu declared that the envoys from Balhae were merchants, and not diplomats, and from thence the frequency of official visits was reduced to every 12 years. In 839, the east guest house was abolished, becoming a pharmacy. Further, after the Kingdom of Balkai was destroyed by the Khitan 926, diplomatic contacts ceased. One theory is that the west guest house was abolished in 920; however, other theories indicate that it declined and only disappeared in the Kamakura period. On the other hand, in 958, Sugawara no Buntoki (Sugawara Michizane's grandson) submitted an opinion to Emperor Murakami recommending the restoration of the Kōrokan to promote diplomacy, indicating that it was no longer functional by that date.

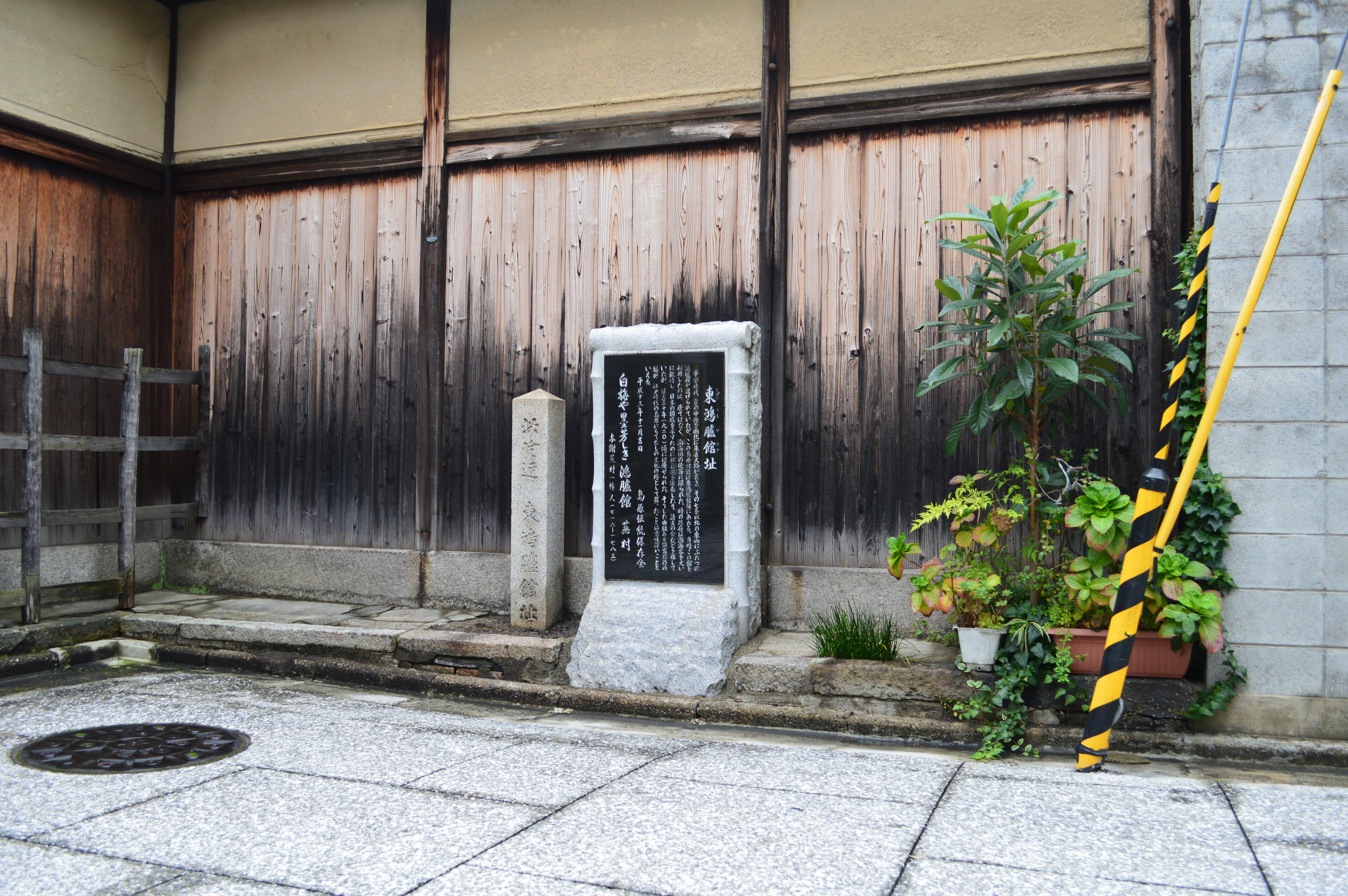
Tōkōrokan (east guest house) Monument

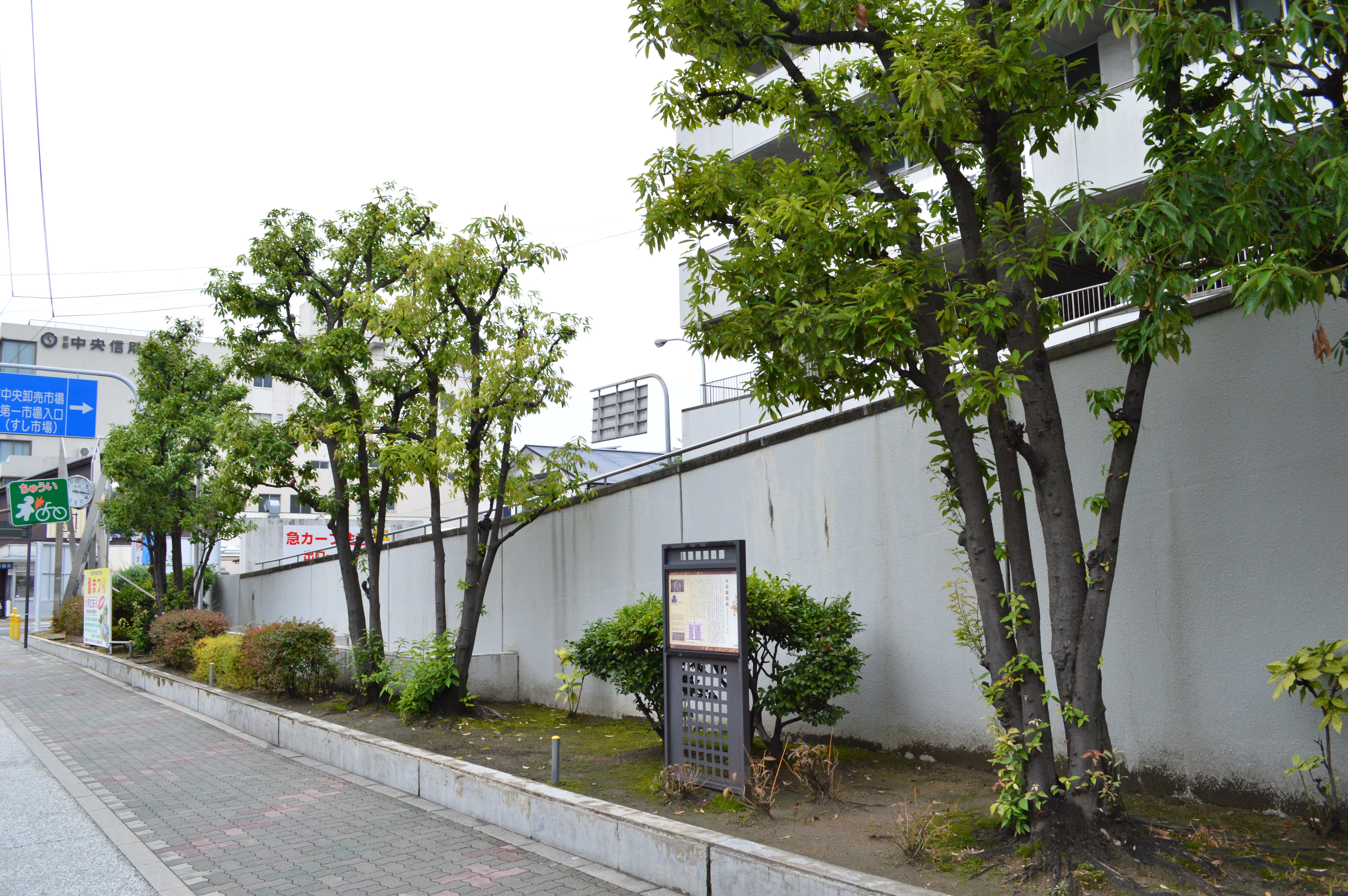
Nishikōrokan (west guest house) Explanation Board

The Heian-kyo kōrokan is mentioned in the first chapter of The Tale of Genji. The novel's protagonist, Hikaru Genji, was sent when he was a seven years old to see an expert physiognomist from Goryeo staying at the kōrokan. The physiognomist sees signs that Hikaru is destined to achieve a "sovereign's supreme eminence".

A monument erected in 1915 marks the site of Higashi Kōrokan in Nishishinyashiki Ageya-cho, Shimogyo-ku.

== See also ==
- List of Historic Sites of Japan (Fukuoka)
