= Tō-ji =

Shingon Buddhist temple in Kyoto, Japan

Coordinates: 34°58′50″N 135°44′52″E

Tō-ji 東寺
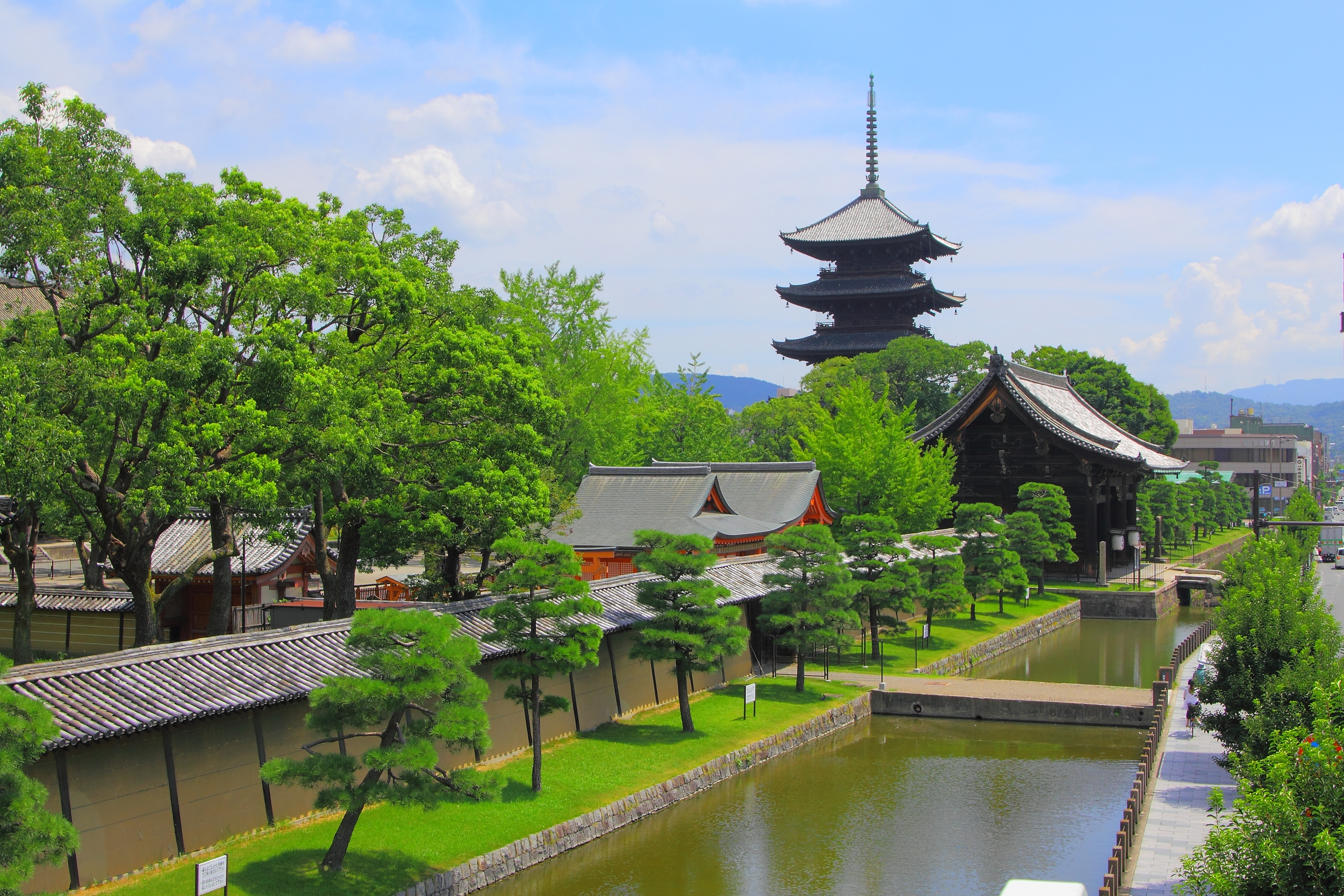
- View of the Tō-ji complex

Religion
- Affiliation: Tōji-Shingon
- Deity: Yakushi Nyorai (Bhaiṣajyaguru)

Location
- Location: 1 Kujōchō, Minami-ku, Kyoto, Kyoto Prefecture
- Country: Japan
- Interactive map of Tō-ji 東寺

Architecture
- Founder: Emperor Kanmu
- Established: 796
- Completed: 1644 (Reconstruction)

Website
- http://www.toji.or.jp/

Tō-ji Temple (東寺, Tō-ji; "East Temple"), a.k.a. the Kyō-ō-gokoku-ji (教王護国寺; The Temple for the Defense of the Nation by Means of the King of Doctrines) is a Shingon Buddhist temple in the Minami-ku ward of Kyoto, Japan.

Founded in 796, Tō-ji Temple was one of the only three Buddhist temples allowed in the city at the time it became the capital of Japan. As such it has a long history, housing treasures and documents from the early Heian period and the Tang dynasty, and with buildings in its complex covering the Kamakura, Muromachi, Momoyama, and Edo periods. Five of these buildings have been designated National Treasures in two different categories: the Lotus Flower Gate (rengemon), the Miei Hall (mieidō), the Golden Hall (kondō) and the five-storied Pagoda (gojūnotō) (temple buildings) and the Kanchiin Guest Hall (kanchiin kyakuden) (residences).

Tō-ji was designated a UNESCO World Heritage Site in 1994, as part of the Historic Monuments of Ancient Kyoto.

== History ==
Tō-ji was founded in the early Heian period. The temple dates from 796, two years after the capital moved to Heian-kyō. Together with its partner Sai-ji, and the temple Shingon-in (located in the Heian Palace), it was one of only three Buddhist temples allowed in the capital at the time and is the only of the three to survive to the present.

It once had a partner, Sai-ji (West Temple) and, together, they stood alongside the Rashomon, the gate to the Heian capital. It was formerly known as Kyō-ō-gokoku-ji (教王護国寺; The Temple for the Defense of the Nation by Means of the King of Doctrines) which indicates that it previously functioned as a temple providing protection for the nation. Tō-ji is located in Minami-ku near the intersection of Ōmiya Street and Kujō Street, southwest of Kyōto Station.

Tō-ji is often associated with Kōbō Daishi (Kūkai). Though Tō-ji began to decline at the end of the Heian period, it came back into the spotlight with the rise of Daishi Shinko (worshipping of Kōbō Daishi) in the Kamakura period. The well-known Buddhist priest was put in charge of Tō-ji in 823 by order of Emperor Saga. The temple's principal image is of Yakushi Nyorai, the Medicine Buddha. Many religious services for Daishi are held in Miei-dō (御影堂) (or Daishi-dō (大師堂), in another name), the residence of Kōbō Daishi. In 1586, the temple was seriously damaged by an earthquake.

== Architecture ==
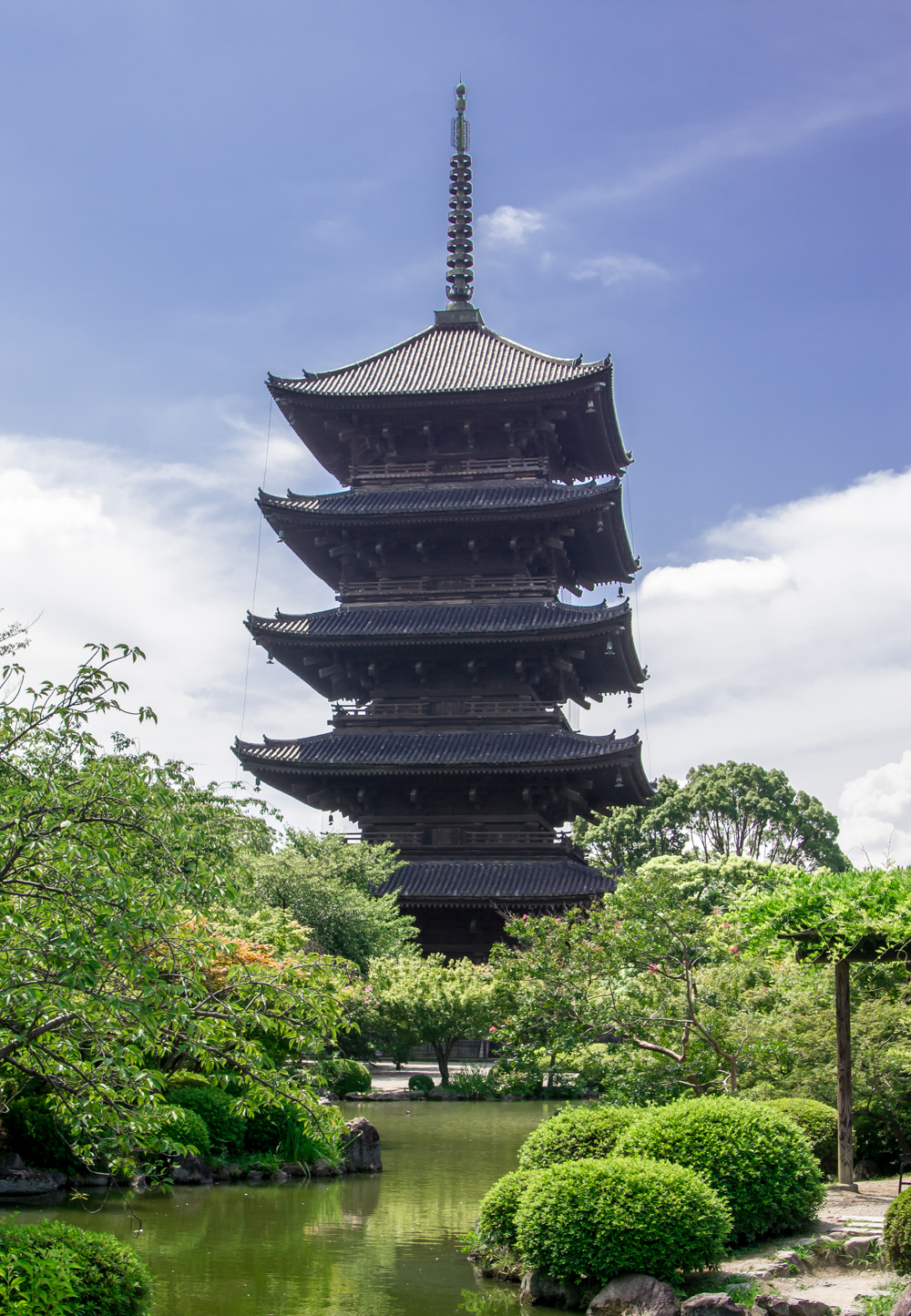
Five-storied Pagoda (National Treasure)

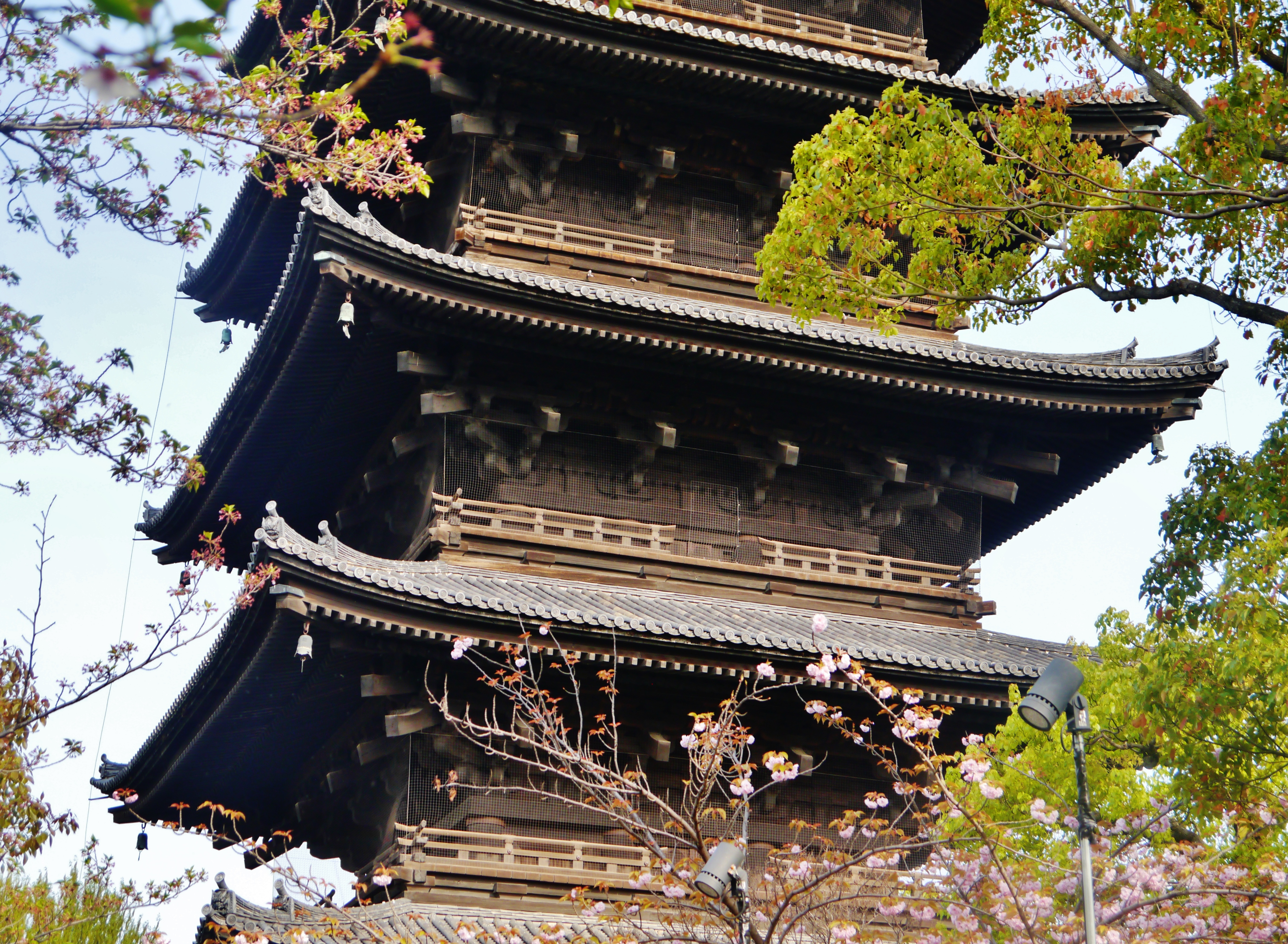
Close-up of the Five-storied Pagoda

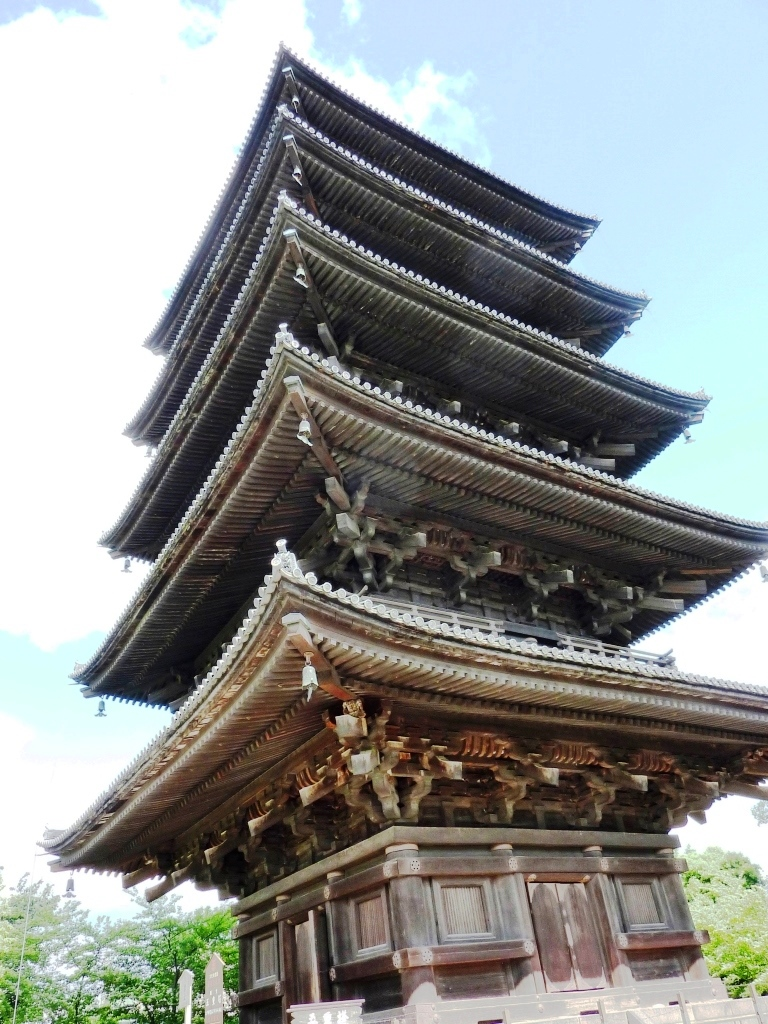
Five roofs of Toji-ji, Kyoto

=== Five-storey Pagoda ===
The five-storied Pagoda (五重塔, gojūnotō) of Tō-ji dates from 1643 (Edo period), when it was rebuilt by order of the third Tokugawa Shōgun, Iemitsu. The original pagoda was built in the 9th century, but it was destroyed and rebuilt four times before reaching its current state. It was designated a National Treasure in 1952.

The pagoda stands 54.8 meters (180 feet) high, and is the tallest wooden tower in Japan. Entrance into the pagoda itself is permitted only on special occasions, but it is usually open and the interior can be seen from the outside. It houses relics, sculptures, and paintings. At ground level, there are statues of four Buddhas facing different directions.

=== Kondo ===
The Kondo or Golden Hall is the main hall of the temple and contains a statue of Yakushi from 1603.

=== Miedo ===
The Miedo is dedicated to Kobo Daishi, also called Kukai, the temple's founder. It stands on the location of his original residence. The hall is opened on the 21st of each month when a memorial service is held for Kukai.

=== Temple grounds ===
The grounds feature a garden and pond, in which turtles and koi swim. The grounds also house an academically rigorous private school, Rakunan, from which many students are sent to elite universities.

=== Architectural Analysis ===
Tō-ji was rebuilt in the early Edo Period, verging on the Kamakura Period. During this rebuild, Tō-ji was dedicated to be a Shingon Buddhist temple (Shingon, a form of Vajrayana Buddhism, was brought to Japan by Kūkai, a priest in 806). These temples were typically built in the mountains and utilized more natural and demographic design elements, dictating the resulting architectural layout. In the Kamakura period, Japanese architects began to utilize technology to resist damage from earthquakes, rainfall, sun, and heat damage. These fortifications were integrated into the remodeling of Tō-ji. This style of building defending against the natural elements evolved into the Zenshūyō style, seen later on in the Kamakura period. This style utilizes the "hidden roof" innovation. Zenshūyō style temples, such as Tō-ji, are characterized by linear spacing outlines of the Garan, hinging panel doors, cusped windows called Katōmado, and decorative pent roofs called Mokoshi. Although containing many of the elements of Zenshūyō style architecture, the Tō-ji temple uses the natural land around it to dictate the layout of the garan, which is a technique used in the Heian Period and Edo Period of Japanese Architecture. This correlates with the Shingon attribution by Emperor Saga in 823. The decorative mokoshi and outfitting of modern structural technology (of the time), were most likely integrated during the remodeling of the tower in the Kamakura Period.

Recognizing the historical and spiritual significance of Tō-ji, UNESCO designated it, along with several other treasures in Kyoto Prefecture, as part of the "Historic Monuments of Ancient Kyoto" World Heritage Site.

== Flea market ==
On the 21st of each month, a famous flea market is held on the grounds of Tō-ji. This market is popularly called Kōbō-san, in honor of Kōbō Daishi (Kūkai), who died on the 21 of the third Month of 835 AD (22 April in the Western Calendar). The flea market features a variety of antiques, art, clothes, pottery, some food, and typical second-hand flea market goods. By far the largest market is held on December 21, as it is the last of the year.

A similar market is held on the 25th of every month at Kitano Tenmangū, also called Tenjin. A Kyoto proverb proclaims, "Fair weather at Tō-ji market means rainy weather at Tenjin market", calling to mind Kyoto's fickle weather.

A smaller, less-crowded, antique-oriented market is held at the Tō-ji grounds on the first Sunday of each month.

== Sai-ji ==
The Rashomon was formerly situated to the west of Tō-ji, though now only a marker remains, reachable a short walk west along Kujō street. A little further west was Sai-ji (West Temple), though now only a small park remains.

Tō-ji and Sai-ji were built at the southern edge of the capital and were the only Buddhist temples officially allowed in Heian-kyō at the time. Sai-ji disappeared in the 16th century. The reason was bad irrigation of Ukyō-ku and the lack of funds to maintain it.

A legend says that at the time of a great drought, Kūkai, the priest at Tō-ji, and Shubin, his colleague at Sai-ji, were both praying for rainfall. Kūkai succeeded where Shubin had failed, and Shubin, envious, shot an arrow at Kūkai. At that time a Jizō appeared and took the arrow instead of Kūkai, saving his life. The Jizō is near the ruins of Rashōmon. It has been chipped where the arrow is thought to have hit.

== Events ==
In 1995, the temple was the stage of the Yanni World Tour,

On July 7, 2007, one of the Live Earth concerts (held to raise awareness of the Earth's climate) was staged at Tō-ji; artists who played included Bonnie Pink, Michael Nyman, Rip Slyme, UA and the Yellow Magic Orchestra.

== Gallery ==
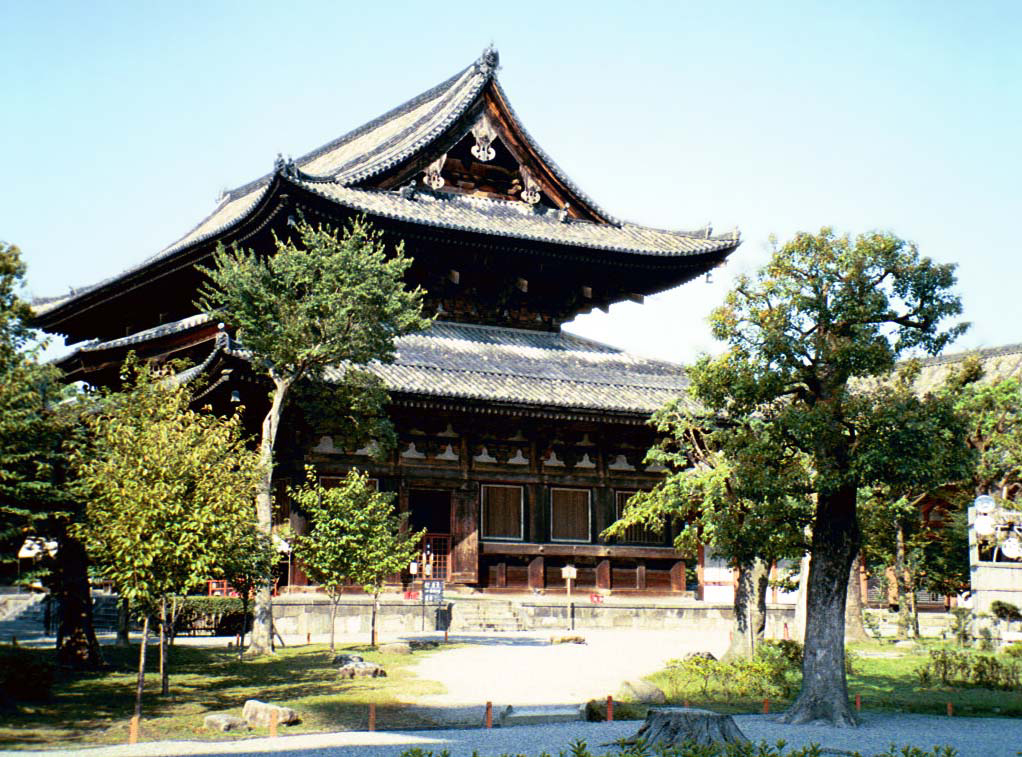
Kondō

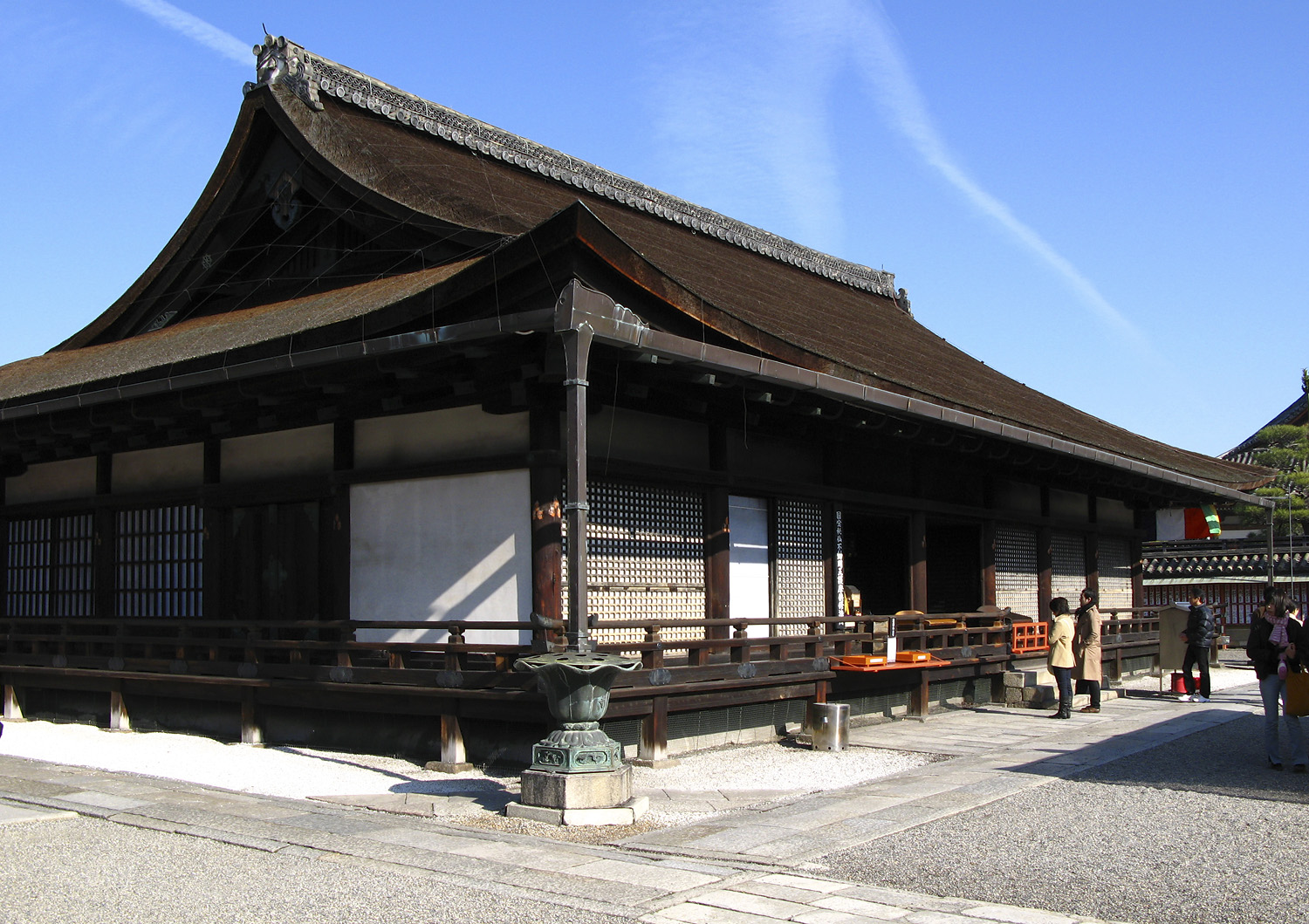
Miedō

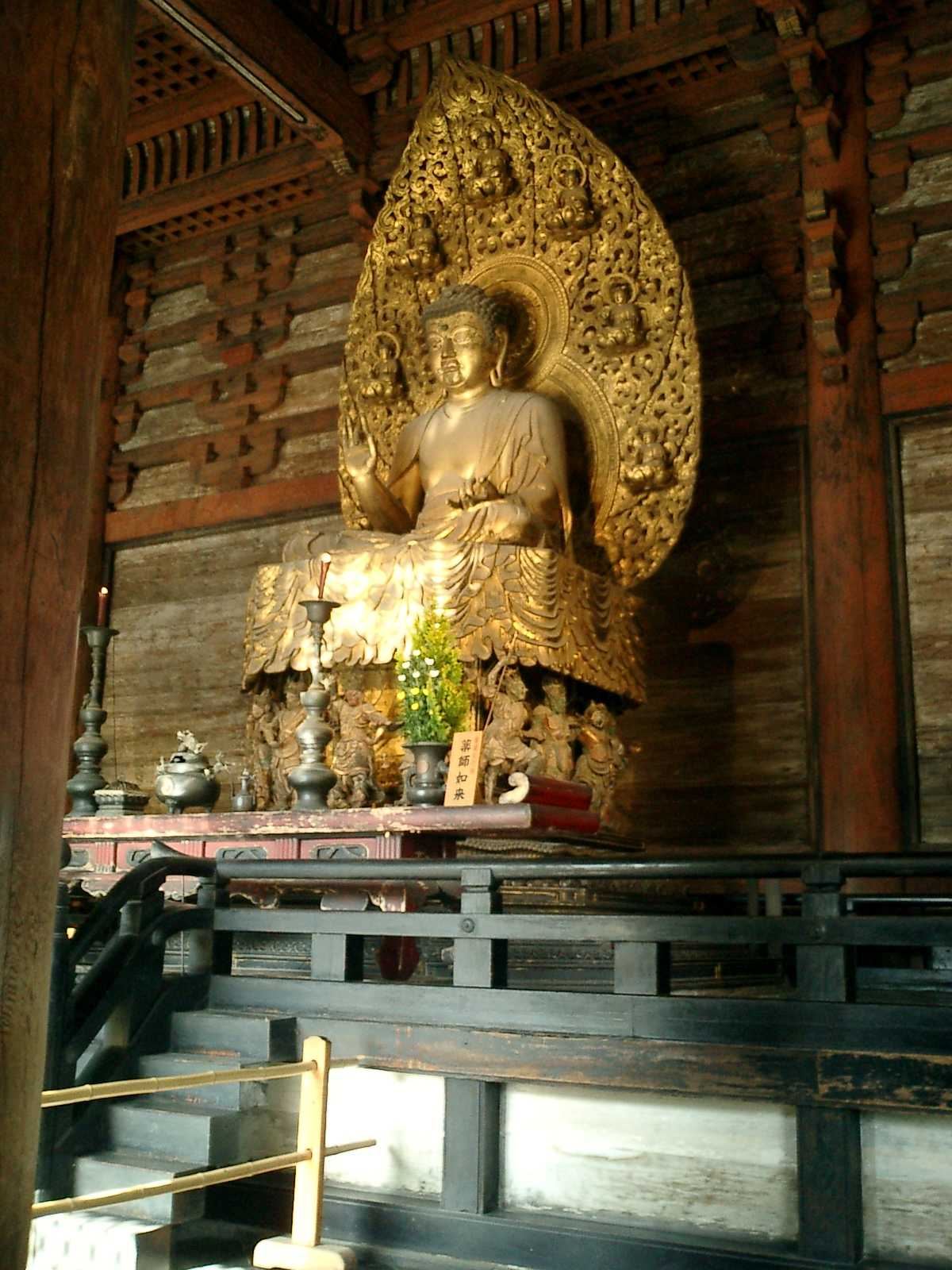
Yakushi

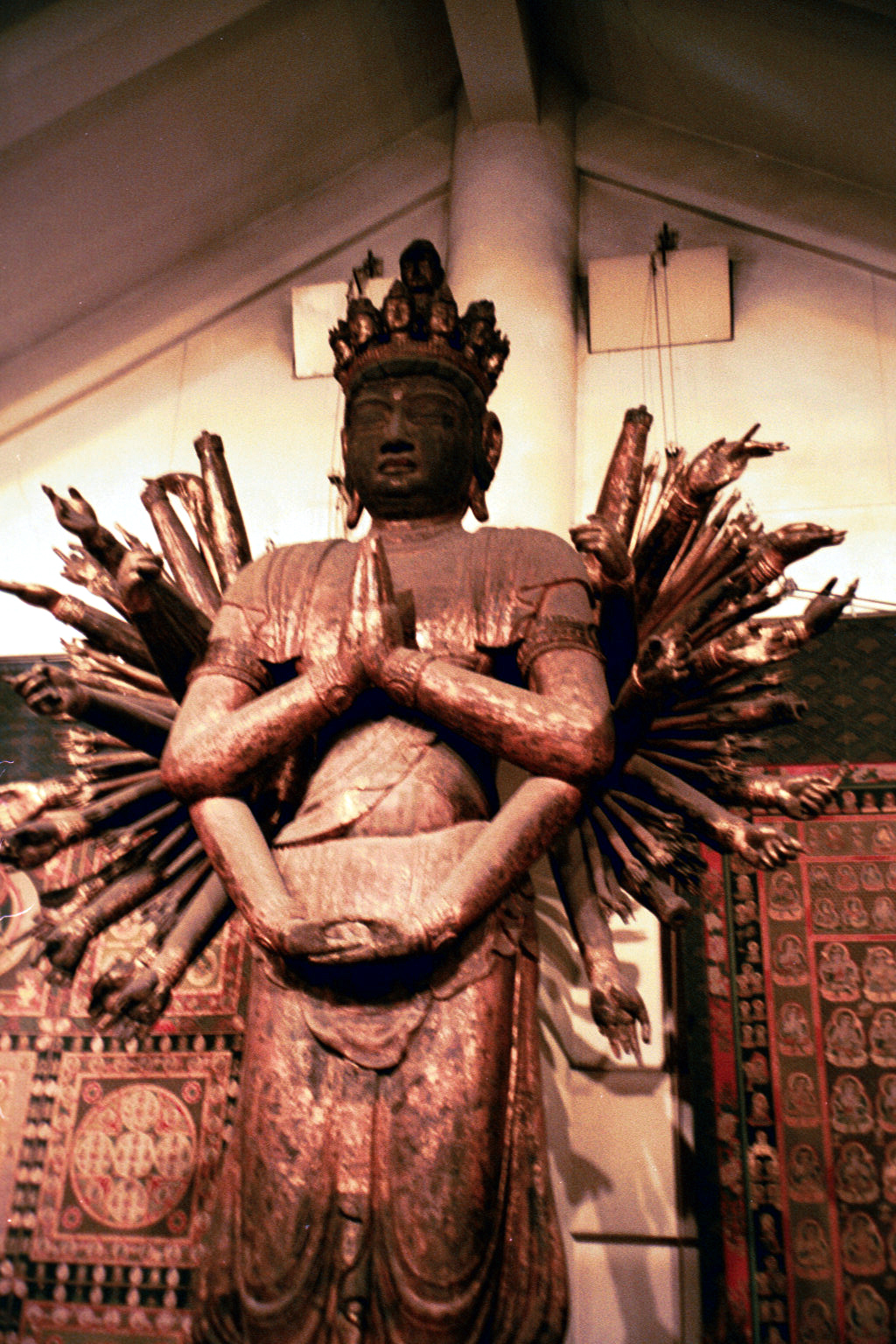
Senju Kannon

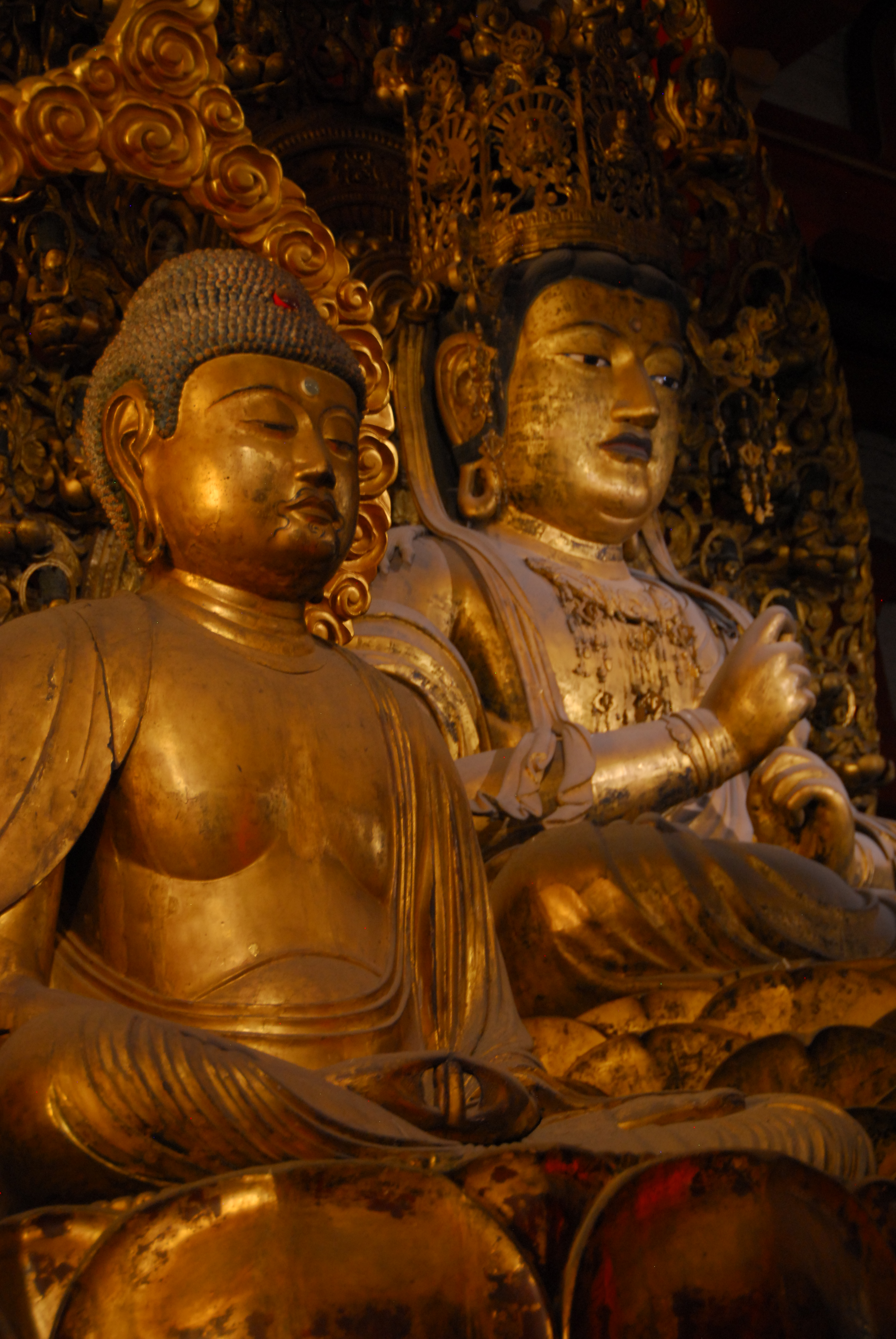
Dainichi and Amida

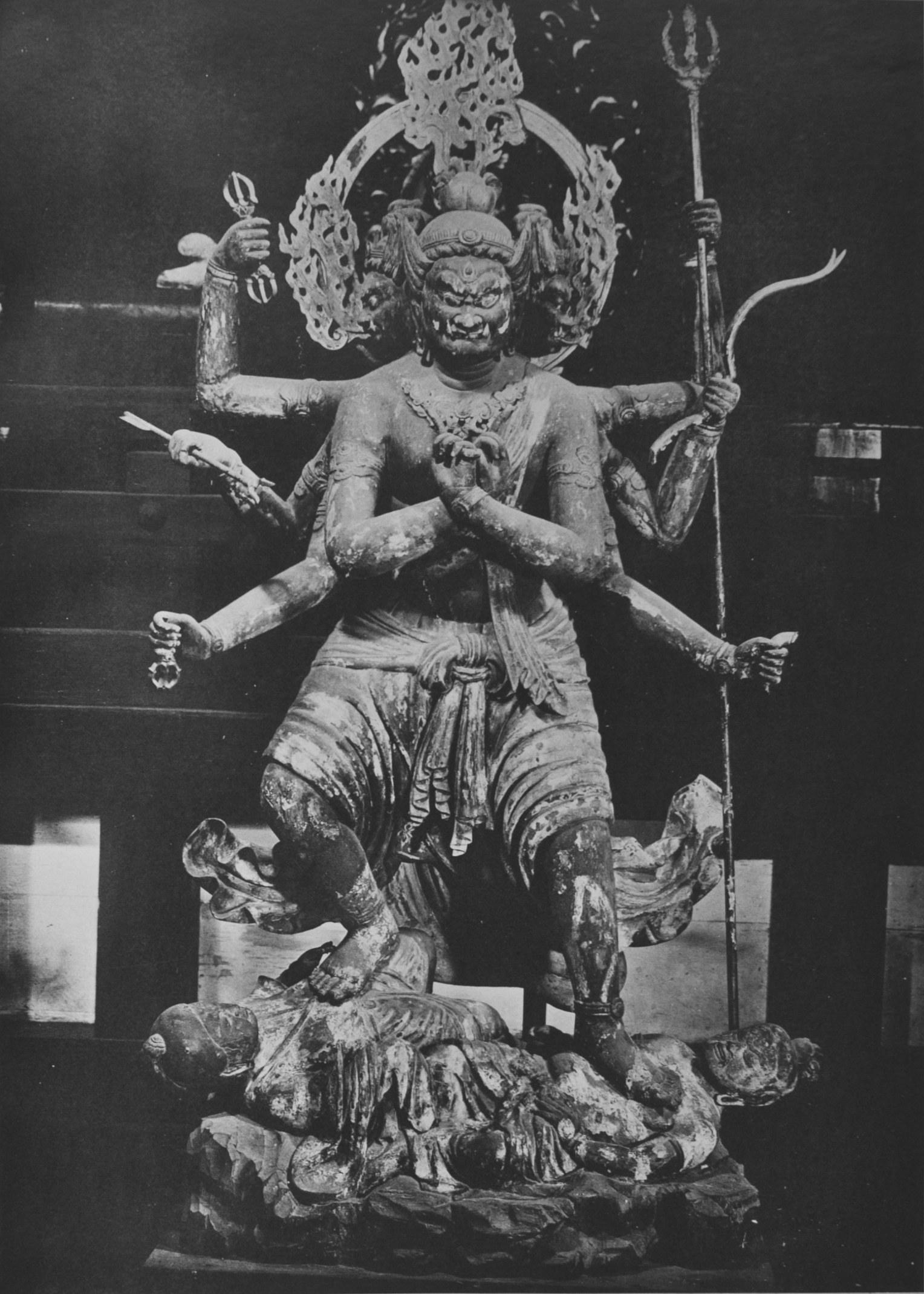
Gōzanze Myōō

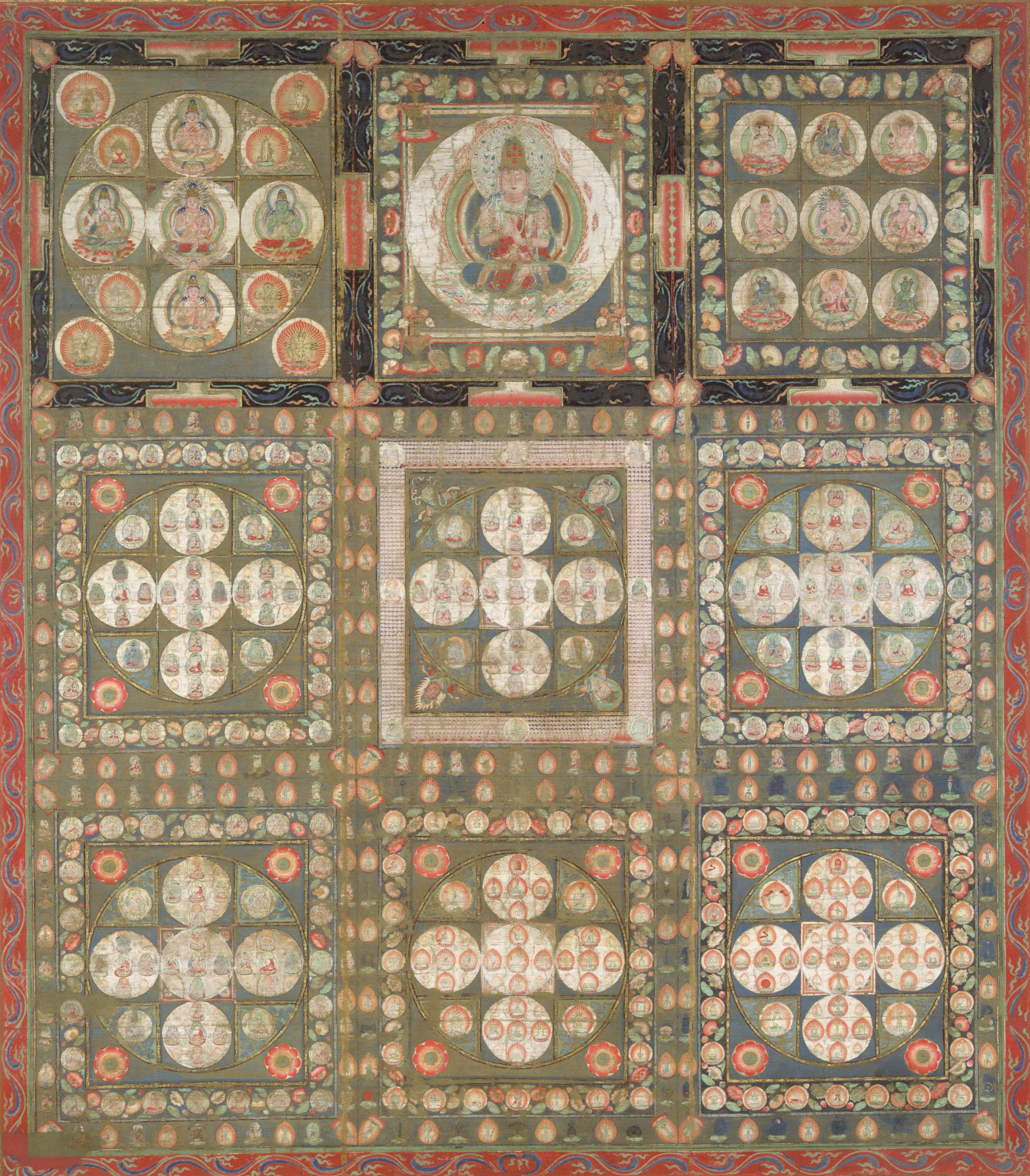
Kongōkai Mandala

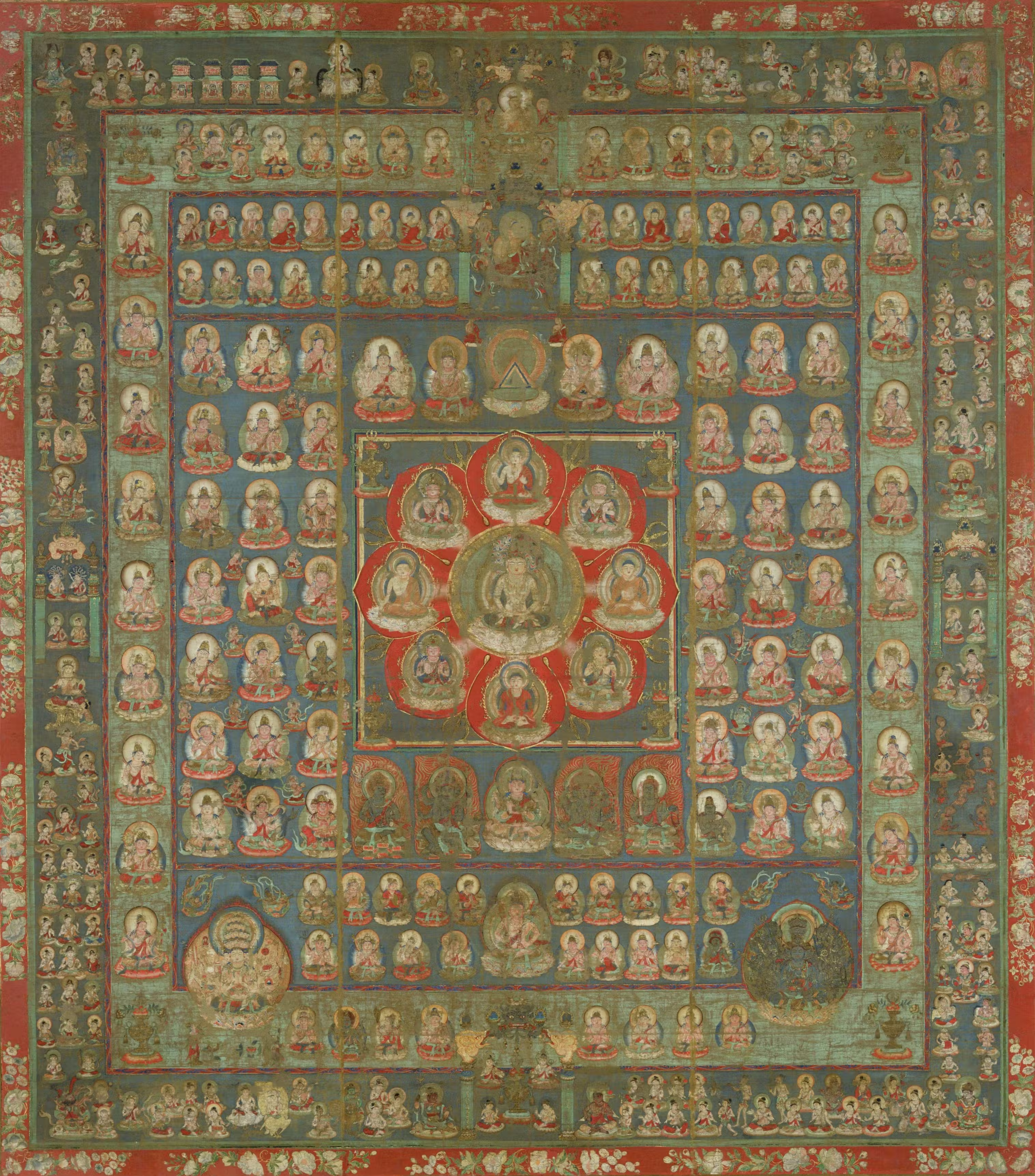
Taizōkai Mandala

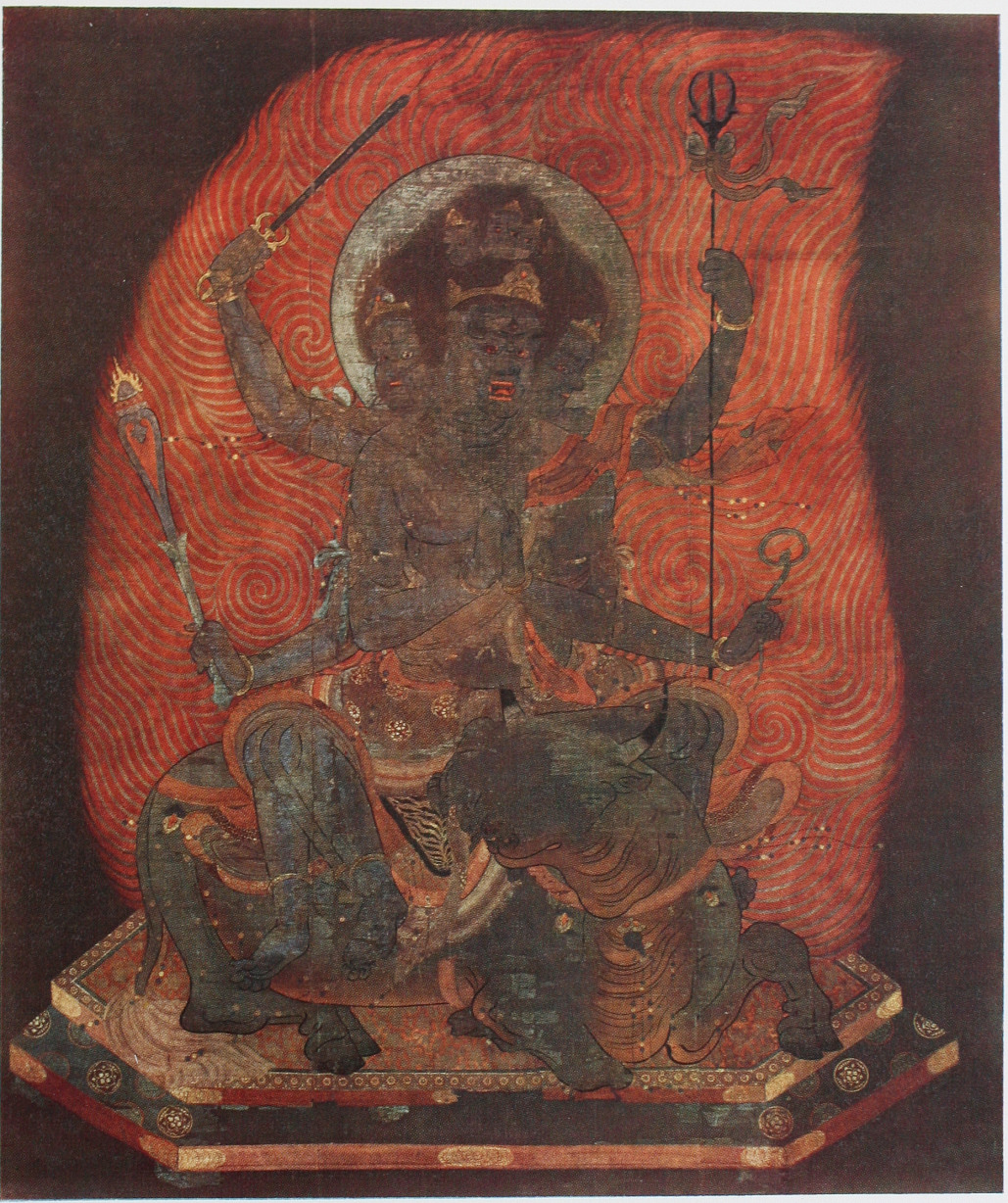
Dai Itoku Myōō

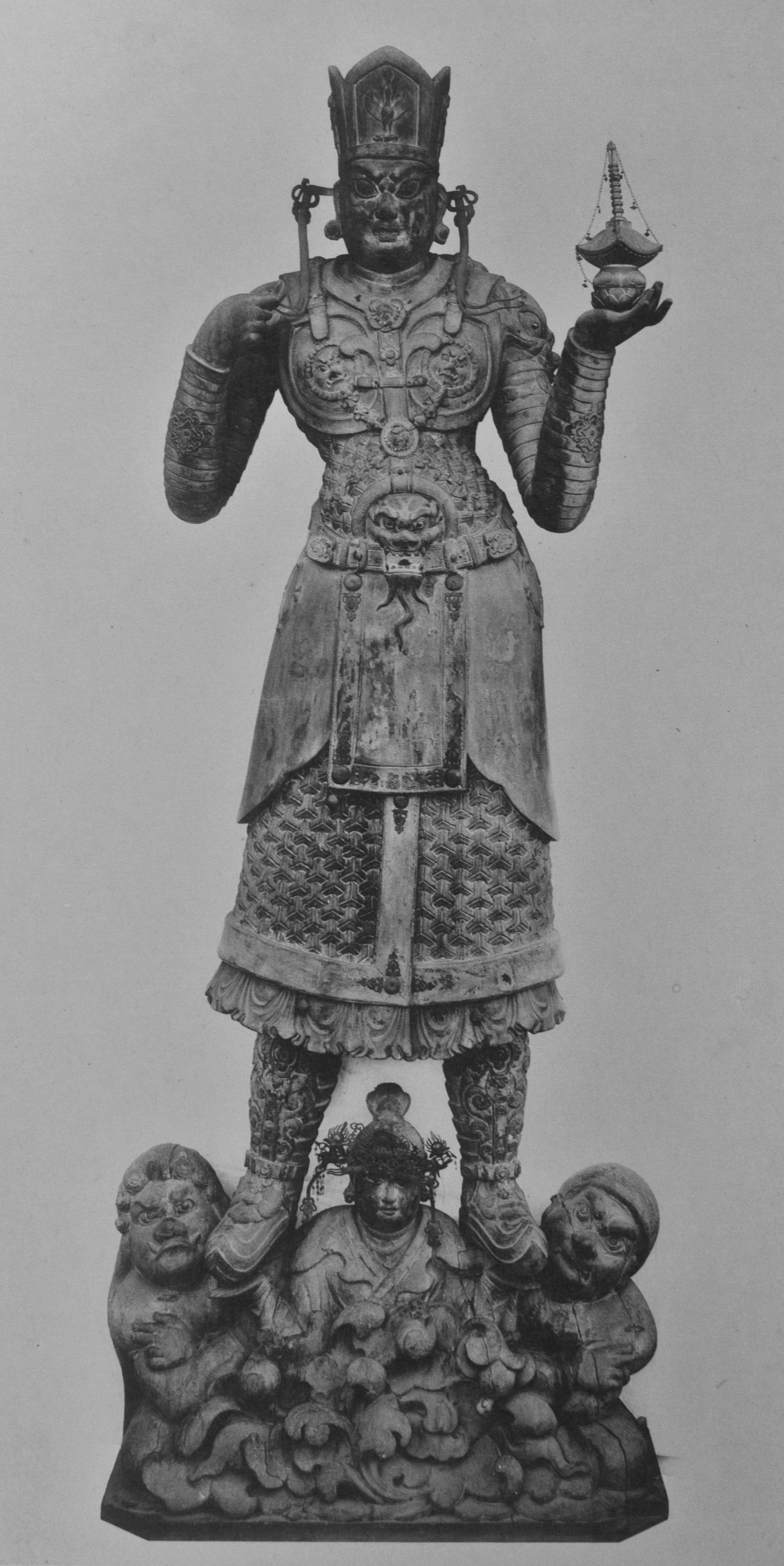
Bishamonten

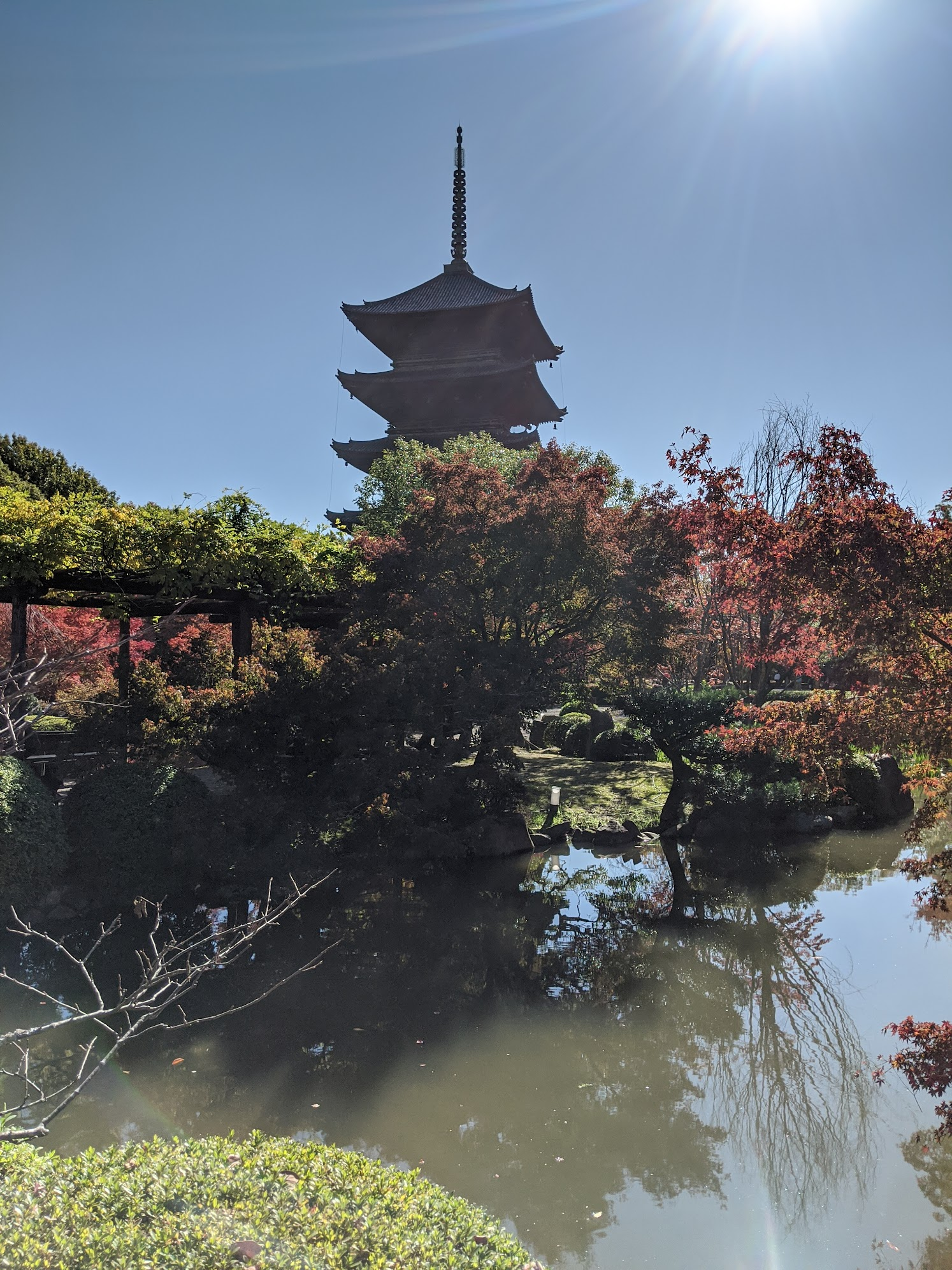

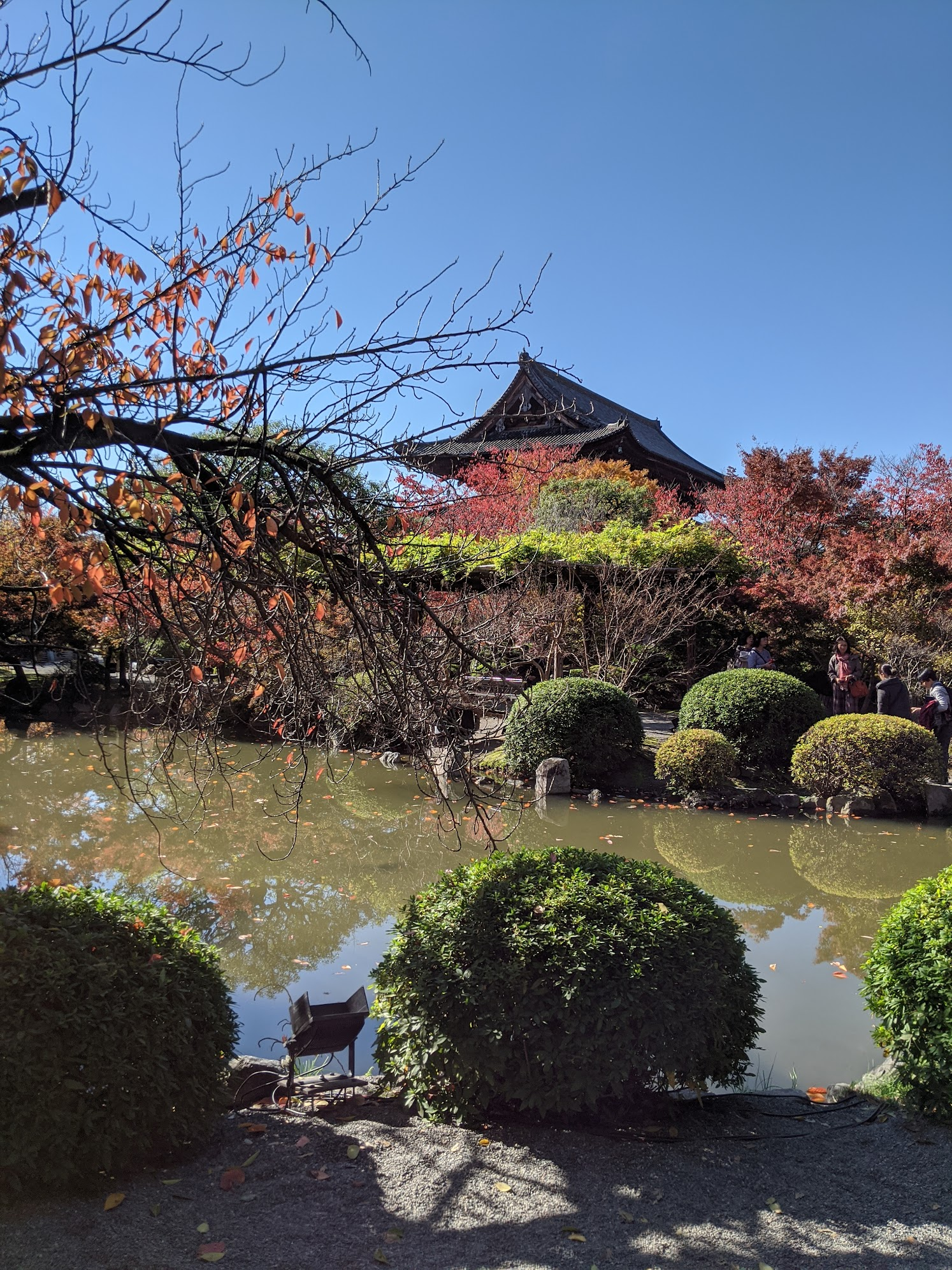

== See also ==
- List of Buddhist temples in Kyoto
- List of National Treasures of Japan (residences)
- List of National Treasures of Japan (temples)
- List of National Treasures of Japan (ancient documents)
- List of National Treasures of Japan (paintings)
- List of National Treasures of Japan (sculptures)
- List of National Treasures of Japan (writings)
- List of National Treasures of Japan (crafts-others)
- List of tallest structures built before the 20th century
- Thirteen Buddhist Sites of Kyoto
