= Milk tea (disambiguation) =

Milk tea is a beverage.

Milk tea may also refer to:

- Bubble tea, a tea-based drink often with tapioca pearls. Sometimes referred to as "milk tea"
- Milk Tea (singer) or Rene Liu (born 1970), Taiwanese singer-songwriter, actress, director, and writer
- "Milk Tea" (Ua song), 1998
- "Milk Tea"/"Utsukushiki Hana", a single by Masaharu Fukuyama, 2006
- "Milk Tea", a song by Koda Kumi from Black Cherry, 2006
- Milk Tea Alliance, online political movement

== See also ==
- Yubisaki Milk Tea, a manga by Tomochika Miyano
