= Yuganda Taiyō =

Single by Ua

from the album Ametora
- Released: May 21, 1998
- Recorded: 1998
- Genre: Pop, alternative rock
- Length: 15:20
- Label: Speedstar Records
- Songwriter(s): Ua, Johnny Fingers, Lenny Kaye
- Producer(s): Johnny Fingers, Lenny Kaye

Ua singles chronology
"Milk Tea" (1998)	"Yuganda Taiyō" (1998)	"Kazoe Tarinai Yoru no Ashioto" (1998)

Alternative covers

"Yuganda Taiyō" (歪んだ太陽) is Japanese singer-songwriter Ua's third re-cut single and tenth overall, released on May 21, 1998. "Yuganda Taiyō" was produced by Johnny Fingers, while the B-side "Koibito" was produced by Lenny Kaye. The single debuted at #77, spending only one week on the Oricon singles chart.

== Track listing ==
=== CD ===
All lyrics are written by Ua.

No.	Title	Music	Length
1.	"Yuganda Taiyō" (歪んだ太陽 "Distorted Sun")	Johnny Fingers	4:36
2.	"Koibito" (恋人 "Lover")	Lenny Kaye	5:59
3.	"Yuganda Taiyō (Instrumental)"	Fingers	4:36
Total length:			15:20

=== Vinyl ===
Side A
No.	Title	Length
1.	"Yuganda Taiyō"
2.	"Yuganda Taiyō (Instrumental)"

Side B
No.	Title	Length
1.	"Koibito"
2.	"Koibito (Instrumental)"

== Charts and sales ==
Chart (1998)	Peak position	Sales
Japan Oricon Weekly Singles Chart	77	4,520
