= Amai Unmei =

Single by Ua
- Released: February 21, 1997
- Recorded: 1997
- Genre: R&B, pop
- Length: 16:09
- Label: Speedstar Records
- Songwriters: Ua, Hirofumi Asamoto, Osamu Yoshioka, Toshio Kawamura
- Producer: Hirofumi Asamoto

Ua singles chronology
"Kumo ga Chigireru Toki" (1996)	"Amai Unmei" (1997)	"Kanashimi Johnny" (1997)

Alternative covers
- 12" vinyl cover

"Amai Unmei" (甘い運命) is Japanese singer-songwriter Ua's seventh single, released on February 21, 1997. It was used in Kanebō cosmetics T'Estimo II commercials.

"Amai Unmei" is Ua's best-selling single. It debuted with 43,920 units sold at #18 on the Oricon Weekly Singles Chart and later peaked at #10, becoming first top 10 entry and highest-charting single. Despite the success of the single, "Amai Unmei" was not included in Ua's second album "Ametora". It was included for the first time in an album on Ua's first compilation Illuminate: The Very Best Songs. In 1998, an English-language version was recorded by the then-duo Double for their single "For Me".

"Amai Unmei" features a cover of Chiga Kahoru's 1969 hit "Mayonaka no Guitar".

== Track listing ==
=== CD ===
No.	Title	Lyrics	Music	Length
1.	"Amai Unmei" (甘い運命 "Sweet Destiny")	Ua	Hirofumi Asamoto	5:23
2.	"Mayonaka no Gitā" (真夜中のギター "Midnight Guitar")	Osamu Yoshioka	Toshio Kawamura	5:13
3.	"Amai Unmei (Instrumental)"		Asamoto	5:23
Total length:				16:09

=== Vinyl ===
Side A
No.	Title	Length
1.	"Amai Unmei"
2.	"Amai Unmei (Aloha Pro Mix)"
3.	"Amai Unmei (Aloha Instrumental)"

Side B
No.	Title	Length
1.	"Mayonaka no Guitar"
2.	"Mayonaka no Guitar (Instrumental)"

== Charts, certifications and sales ==
Chart (1997)	Peak position	Certifications (sales thresholds)	Sales
Japan Oricon Weekly Singles Chart	10	Gold	327,070
Japan Oricon Yearly Singles Chart	94	Gold	327,070
