= Sai-ji =

Ruined Buddhist temple in Kyoto, Japan

- 西寺 (Japanese)
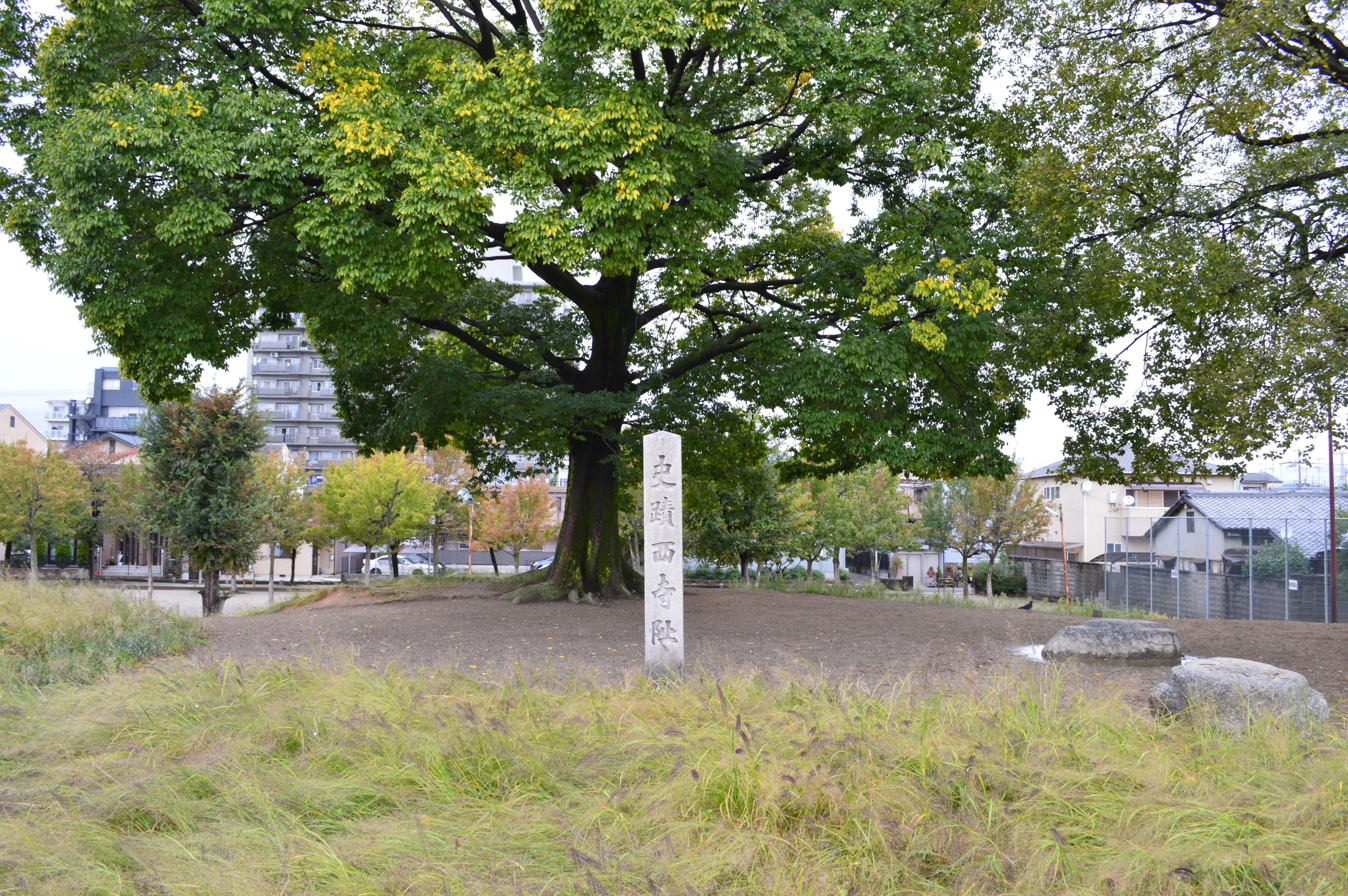
- Sai-ji ruins

- Sai-ji ruins Sai-ji (Japan)
- Interactive map of Sai-ji
- 34°58′51.08″N 135°44′15.95″E
- Type: temple ruins
- Periods: Hakuhō period
- Location: Minami-ku, Kyoto, Japan
- Region: Kansai region

History
- Built: c. 7th century AD

Site notes
- Public access: Yes (park)

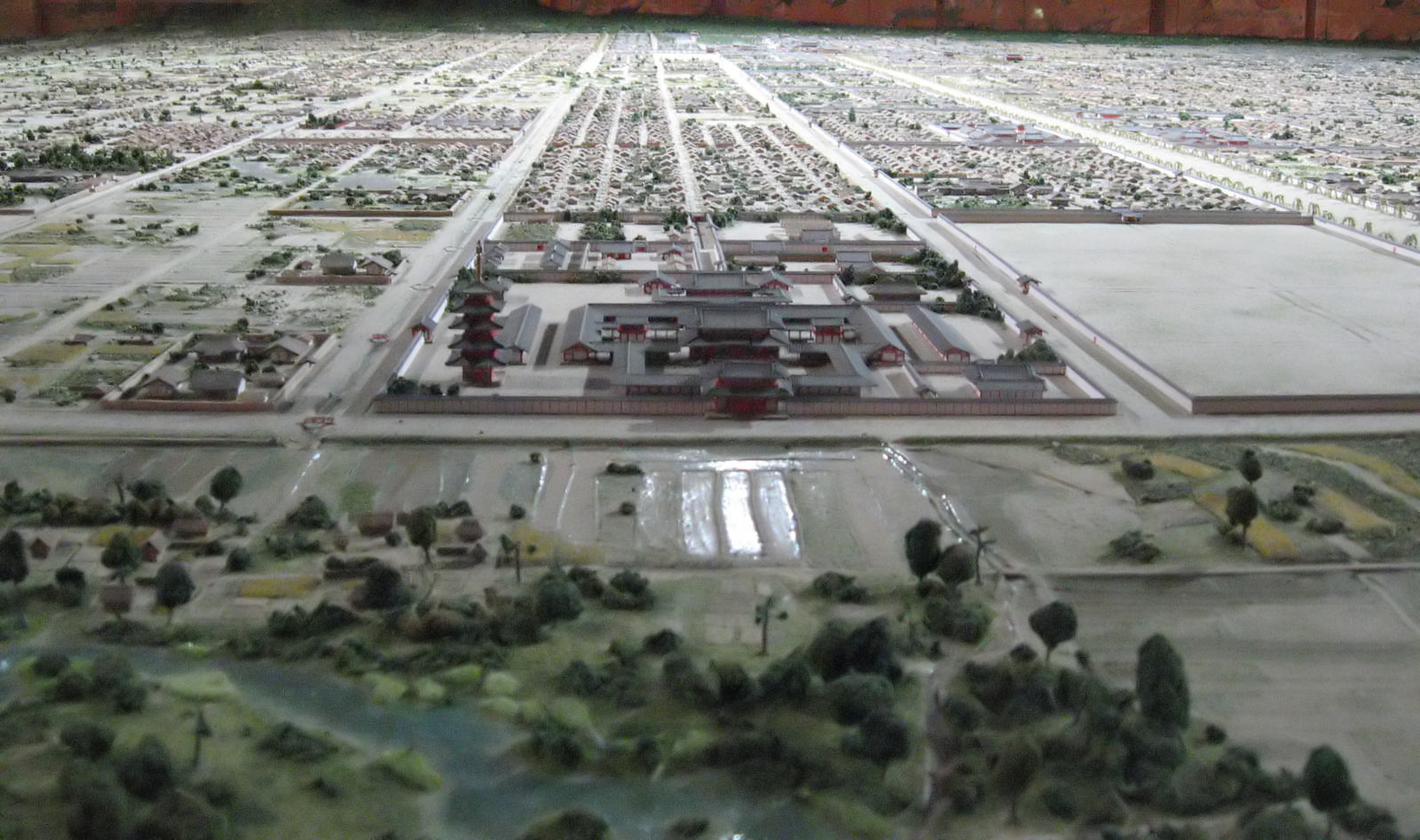
Miniature Model of Saiji, Heiankyo (Kyoto City Heiankyo Sosei-Kan Museum)

Sai-ji (西寺, Sai-ji) or the West Temple was a Buddhist temple located in the Karahashi neighborhood of the Minami ward of the city of Kyoto, Japan. The temple no longer exists, and its ruins were designated a National Historic Site in 1921, with the area under protection expanded in 1966.

== Overview ==
When the capital of Japan was relocated from Heijō-kyō (modern Nara to Heian-kyō (modern Kyoto), Emperor Kanmu ordered the construction of two national temples to be constructed symmetrically on either side of the Suzaku Avenue (Suzaku-ōji, present-day Senbon-dōri), just north of the great Rashōmon gate near the southern edge of the city. These two temples (Sai-ji in the west and Tō-ji in the east) together with Shingon-in in the Heian Palace) were the only Buddhist institutions allowed in the capital at the time it was established. This policy was introduced by Emperor Kanmu in order to curb the political influence the large Buddhist institutions had acquired in Heijō-kyō during the 8th century. Each occupied a square site of approximately 300 by 300 meters. Both temples were charged with prayers for the protection of the nation and the Imperial family of Japan. Sai-ji may also have been used as a facility for receiving foreign envoys as a part of the Ritsuryo system, the Kōrokan.

It is unclear when the construction of the Sai-ji and Tō-ji temples began, but the first known documentary record is an entry dated April 4, 16th year of Enryaku (May 4, 797) in the Ruijū Kokushi, where a court noble named Kasa-no-Ehito is listed as the deputy builder of Sai-ji. Since there are no records of appointments to this post after 815, it is believed that the temples were completed by that time. In 823, during the reign of Emperor Saga, Tō-ji was bestowed to Kūkai and Sai-ji to Shubin, a monk of the Sanron and Hosso sects, who was Kūkai's arch-rival. According to legend, during a drought in 824, he competed with Kūkai in his spiritual powers at a rain-making ceremony at Shinsenen Garden, and was so angry at being defeated that he shot an arrow at Kūkai. The lecture hall of Sai-ji was completed in 832. The Sōkan, or government office in charge of regulating the Buddhist priesthood, was moved from Yakushi-ji to Sai-ji by 864. In 990, there was a fire, but the temple was quickly rebuilt. During the Kenkyū era (1190s), Mongaku restored the Sai-ji pagoda, with Myōe supervising the construction work. However, the temple was falling into disrepair, and the rebuilt pagoda was burned down again in 1233. The temple appears to have been abandoned around that time. The reasons for Sai-ji's decline include the poor drainage of its location in western Kyoto, which led to the abandonment of the eastern half of Heian-kyō by the late Heian period, as well as the lack of support from the Imperial Court. On the other hand, Tō-ji has survived (albeit rebuilt) into modern times.

== Current situation ==
Archaeological excavations were conducted at the site of Sai-ji in 1959, confirming the remains of the main hall, corridors, monks' quarters, dining hall, and south gate. The existing earthen platform, which was the basis of the National Historic Site designation in 1921 was found to be the remains of the foundations of the lecture hall. This is now part of Karahashi Saiji Park, and has a stone monument and explanatory placards declaring this location to be the site of Sai-ji. The park is about an eight-minute walk from Nishioji Station on the JR West Tokaido Main Line. A portion of the foundation stones for the main hall unearthed during the excavations remains, and it is now in the grounds of Kyoto Municipal Karahashi Elementary School. The remains of pagoda tower are near the site of Karahashi Elementary School, but it has not been confirmed whether the foundation stones are buried underground or were destroyed by the time the elementary school was built. The designated historic site includes the Karahashi Elementary School site, Karahashi Saiji Park site, private land north of the park and south of Toji-dori, and the roads to the west of these.

A modern Jōdo-shū temple called "Sai-ji" located near Karahashi Saiji Park claims to be the successor to the historical Sai-ji.

== See also ==
- List of Historic Sites of Japan (Kyoto)
