= Kumo ga Chigireru Toki =

Single by Ua

from the album 11
- Released: November 21, 1996
- Recorded: 1996
- Genre: Pop, alternative rock
- Length: 14:43
- Label: Speedstar Records
- Songwriter(s): Ua, Hirofumi Asamoto, Monday Michiru
- Producer(s): Hirofumi Asamoto

Ua singles chronology
"Rhythm" (1996)	"Kumo ga Chigireru Toki" (1996)	"Amai Unmei" (1997)

Alternative covers
- 12" vinyl cover

"Kumo ga Chigireru" (雲がちぎれる時) is Japanese singer-songwriter Ua's second re-cut single and sixth overall, released on November 21, 1996. It debuted with 5,920 copies sold at #73 on the Oricon Weekly Singles Chart. The single includes a cover of Patti Smith Group's "Because the Night".

== Track listing ==
=== CD ===
No.	Title	Lyrics	Music	Length
1.	"Kumo ga Chigireru Toki" (雲がちぎれる時 "When Clouds Are Torn to Pieces")	Ua	Hirofumi Asamoto	4:59
2.	"'Til the Clouds Break"	Ua, Monday Michiru	Asamoto	5:19
3.	"Because the Night"	Patti Smith	Bruce Springsteen	5:19
Total length:				14:43

=== Vinyl ===
Side A
No.	Title	Length
1.	"Kumo ga Chigireru Toki"
2.	"Because the Night"

Side B
No.	Title	Length
1.	"'Til the Clouds Break"
2.	"'Til the Clouds Break (Quickening Mix)"
3.	"'Til the Clouds Break (A Capella)"

== Charts and sales ==
Chart (1996)	Peak position	Sales
Japan Oricon Weekly Singles Chart	73	10,520
