= Woman of Water =

2002 film by Hidenori Sugimori

- Directed by: Hidenori Sugimori
- Written by: Hidenori Sugimori
- Produced by: Naoki Kai; Hiroyuki Negishi
- Starring: Ua; Tadanobu Asano
- Cinematography: Hiroshi Machida
- Edited by: Hidenori Sugimori
- Music by: Yoko Kanno
- Release date: 2002
- Country: Japan
- Language: Japanese

Woman of Water (Japanese: 水の女, romanized: Mizu no onna) is a 2002 Japanese drama film written and directed by Hidenori Sugimori, in his feature film debut.

The film premiered at the 59th edition of the Venice Film Festival, in the Venice International Film Critics' Week sidebar. It won the Golden Alexander Award at the 43rd Thessaloniki International Film Festival.

== Cast ==
- Ua as Ryo
- Tadanobu Asano as Yusaku
- Hikaru as Yukino
- Yutaka Enatsu as Tadao Shimizu
- Ryûichi Ôura (ja) as Yoshio
- Mayumi Ogawa as Midori
