= Rhythm (song) =

Single by Ua

from the album 11
- Released: September 24, 1996
- Recorded: 1996
- Genre: R&B, Pop
- Length: 10:33
- Label: Speedstar Records
- Songwriter(s): Ua, Shinichi Osawa,
- Producer(s): Shinichi Osawa

Ua singles chronology
| "Jōnetsu" (1996) | "Rhythm" (1996) | "Kumo ga Chigireru Toki" (1996) |

Alternative covers
- 12" vinyl cover

"Rhythm" (リズム) is Japanese singer-songwriter Ua's fifth single, released on September 24, 1996. It served as ending theme for the TBS TV program Face. It sold 17,800 copies in its first week, debuting at #20 on the Oricon Weekly Singles Chart and becoming Ua's second top 20 entry.

== Track listing ==
=== CD ===
All lyrics are written by Ua

| No. | Title | Music | Length |
|---|---|---|---|
| 1. | "Rizumu" (リズム "Rhythm") | Shinichi Osawa | 5:31 |
| 2. | "Akai Anata" (赤いあなた "Red You") | Ayane Tannan, Yoshihiro Nishizawa | 4:58 |
| Total length: | | | 10:33 |

=== Vinyl ===
Side A
| No. | Title | Length |
|---|---|---|
| 1. | "Rhythm (Radio Mix)" |
| 2. | "Rhythm (Sakuragaoka Flava Mix)" |
| 3. | "Rhythm (Murphy's Hip Hop Mix)" |

Side B
| No. | Title | Length |
|---|---|---|
| 1. | "Akai Anata (Radio Mix)" |
| 2. | "Akai Anata (Cold School Mix)" |

== Charts and sales ==
| Chart (1996) | Peak position | Sales |
|---|---|---|
| Japan Oricon Weekly Singles Chart | 20 | 63,180 |
