= Ajico =

Japanese rock band

- Origin: Japan
- Years active: 2000–2001
- Labels: Speedstar Records
- Past members: Ua - Vocal; Ken'ichi Asai - Guitar and vocal Tokie - Baixo; Kyōichi Shiino - Drums
- Website: Ajico Official Website

Ajico is a Japanese rock band, formed as a side project by Japanese singer Ua, and Kenichi Asai of Blankey Jet City. In the summer of 1999 after supplying music for two of Ua's songs, Asai and Ua decided to create a music group, and Ajico was born.

== Discography ==
=== Singles ===
- "Hadou" (22 November 2000)
- "Utsukushii Koto" (24 January 2001)
- "Pepin" (27 June 2001)

=== Albums ===
- Fukamidori (7 February 2001)
- Ajico Show (25 July 2001)
- Setsuzoku (26 May 2021)
- Love no Genkei (13 May 2024)

=== DVD ===
- Ajico Show (25 July 2001)
