= Petit (EP) =

EP by Ua
- Released: October 21, 1995
- Recorded: 1995
- Genre: Pop; R&B; soul; techno
- Length: 32:19
- Label: Speedstar Records
- Producer: Ua; Hiroshi Fujiwara; Hirofumi Asamoto

Ua chronology
Petit (1995)	11 (1996)

Singles from Petit
- 1. "Horizon" Released: June 21, 1995; 2. "Taiyō Te ni Tsuki wa Kokoro no Ryōte ni" Released: February 21, 1996

Petit is an EP by Japanese singer-songwriter Ua, released on October 21, 1995. Like its lead single, Petit also failed to chart on the Oricon charts. The EP was re-issued on September 22, 2005.

== Track listing ==
All lyrics are written by Ua

No.	Title	Music	Length
1.	"Horizon"	Hiroshi Fujiwara	4:55
2.	"Yume wo Mita Sakana" (夢を見た魚 "The Fish Who Dreamt")	Fujiwara	4:19
3.	"Song + Sky"	Fujiwara, Hirofumi Asamoto	4:50
4.	"Taiyō Te ni Tsuki wa Kokoro no Ryōte ni"	Fujiwara, Asamoto	5:24
5.	"Ondo" (温度 "Temperature")	Fujiwara	5:55
6.	"Horizon (Too Fast to Live, Too Young to Die Mix: Fumiya Tanaka Re-Mix Version)"	Fujiwara	6:51
Total length:			32:19
