= Kanashimi Johnny =

Single by Ua

from the album Ametora
- Released: October 22, 1997
- Recorded: 1997
- Genre: R&B, pop
- Length: 16:27
- Label: Speedstar Records
- Songwriter(s): Ua, Hirofumi Asamoto, Hakase
- Producer(s): Hirofumi Asamoto

Ua singles chronology
"Amai Unmei" (1997)	"Kanashimi Johnny" (1997)	"Milk Tea" (1998)

Alternative covers
- 12" vinyl cover

"Kanashimi Johnny" (悲しみジョニー) is Japanese singer-songwriter Ua's eighth single, released on October 22, 1997. It served as theme song for the TBS TV drama "Fukigen na Kajitsu" starring Yuriko Ishida. "Kanashimi Johnny" debuted at number 11 on the Oricon Weekly Singles Chart with 60,740 units sold, becoming Ua's highest debut. Its b-side "Amefuri Hiades" was used in UCC Ueshima Coffee's Super 2 commercials.

== Track listing ==
=== CD ===
All lyrics are written by Ua

No.	Title	Music	Length
1.	"Kanashimi Jonī" (悲しみジョニー "Sad Johnny")	Hirofumi Asamoto	5:42
2.	"Amefuri Hiyadesu" (あめふりヒヤデス "Hiades in the Rain")	Hakase	4:52
3.	"Amai Unmei (Instrumental)"	Asamoto	5:42
Total length:			16:09

=== Vinyl ===
Side A
No.	Title	Length
1.	"Kanashimi Johnny"
2.	"Kanashimi Johnny (Last Portpia)"
3.	"Kanashimi Johnny (Instrumental)"

Side B
No.	Title	Length
1.	"Amefuri Hiades (Alternate Mix)"
2.	"Amefuri Hiades (Dub)"
3.	"Amefuri Hiades (Mo' Spunky Mix)"
4.	"Amefuri Hiades (Mo' Sparky Mix)"

== Charts, certifications and sales ==
Chart (1997)	Peak position	Certifications (sales thresholds)	Sales
Japan Oricon Weekly Singles Chart	11	Gold	210,270
