= Taiyō Te ni Tsuki wa Kokoro no Ryōte ni =

Single by Ua

from the album Petit
- Released: February 21, 1996
- Recorded: 1995
- Genre: Pop
- Length: 9:39
- Label: Speedstar Records
- Songwriters: Ua, Hiroshi Fujiwara
- Producer: Hiroshi Fujiwara

Ua singles chronology
"Colony" (1995)	"Taiyō Te ni Tsuki wa Kokoro no Ryōte ni" (1996)	"Jōnetsu" (1996)

"Taiyō Te ni Tsuki wa Kokoro no Ryōte ni" (太陽手に月は心の両手に) is Japanese singer-songwriter Ua's first re-cut single and third overall, released on February 21, 1996. "Taiyō Te ni Tsuki wa Kokoro no Ryōte ni" is Ua's first single to chart, peaking at #99 with 3,040 units sold in its first week.

== Track listing ==
All lyrics are written by Ua.

No.	Title	Music	Length
1.	"Taiyō Te ni Tsuki wa Kokoro no Ryōte ni (Single Version)" (太陽手に月は心の両手に "Sun in My Hand, Moon in My Heart")	Hiroshi Fujiwara	4:55
2.	"Mama"	Hirokazu Ogura	4:19
Total length:			9:39

== Charts and sales ==
Chart (1996)	Peak position	Sales
Japan Oricon Weekly Singles Chart	99	6,020
