= 11 (Ua album) =

Studio album by Ua
- Released: October 23, 1996
- Recorded: 1995–1996
- Genre: Pop; R&B; soul
- Length: 65:39
- Label: Speedstar Records
- Producer: Ua; Shinichi Osawa; Takuji Aoyagi; Ryoji Oba; Nobukazu Takemura; Jeremy Shaw; Hirofumi Asamoto; Yasushi Furuichi; Meyna Co.; Coba

Ua chronology
Petit (1995)	11 (1996)	Fine Feathers Make Fine Birds (1997)

Singles from 11
- 1. "Jōnetsu" Released: June 21, 1996; 2. "Rhythm" Released: September 24, 1996; 3. "Kumo ga Chigireru Toki" Released: November 21, 1996

11 is the first studio album by the pop singer-songwriter Ua. It was released on October 23, 1996. The album was re-issued on September 22, 2005.

== Track listing ==
All lyrics are written by Ua.

No.	Title	Music	Length
1.	"Rhythm (Album Version)"	Shinichi Osawa	5:53
2.	"Ōkina Ki ni Amaete" (大きな木に甘えて "Depend on the Large Tree")	Takuji Aoyagi	5:05
3.	"Ochita Hoshi" (落ちた星 "Fallen Star")	Ryoji Oba	5:21
4.	"Barairo" (バラ色 "Rose-Color")	Nobukazu Takemura	6:05
5.	"Zerī" (ゼリー "Jelly")	Jeremy Shaw, Simon Richmond	5:20
6.	"Himawari" (ヒマワリ "Sunflower")	Shaw, Richmond	5:46
7.	"Kumo ga Chigireru Toki"	Hirofumi Asamoto	4:58
8.	"Jōnetsu (King Wadada Dub)"	Asamoto	4:52
9.	"Akai Hana" (紅い花 "Red Flower")	Yasushi Furuichi	4:47
10.	"Mizuiro" (水色 "Aqua")	Meyna Co.	4:54
11.	"Randebū" (ランデブー "Rendezvous")	Coba	6:36
Total length:			59:46

== Charts, certifications and sales ==
Chart (1996/1997)	Peak position	Certifications (sales thresholds)	Sales
Japan Oricon Weekly Albums Chart	3	2× Platinum	814,890
Japan Oricon Yearly Albums Chart	38	2× Platinum	814,890

== Release history ==
Region	Date	Format	Label
Japan	23 October 1996	CD	Jetstar Records
Taiwan	23 October 1996	CD	Friendly Dogs
Japan	22 September 2005	CD	Jetstar Records
Japan	19 December 2012	CD	Jetstar Records
Japan	25 May 2016	SHM-CD; (Deluxe edition)	Jetstar Records
