= Jōnetsu (Ua song) =

Single by Ua

from the album 11
- Released: June 21, 1996
- Recorded: 1996
- Genre: R&B, Pop
- Length: 8:37
- Label: Speedstar Records
- Songwriters: Ua, Hirofumi Asamoto, Shin Watanabe
- Producer: Hirofumi Asamoto

Ua singles chronology
"Taiyō Te ni Tsuki wa Kokoro no Ryōte ni" (1996)	"Jōnetsu" (1996)	"Rhythm" (1996)

Alternative covers
- 12" vinyl cover

"Jōnetsu" (情熱) is Japanese singer-songwriter Ua's fourth single, released on June 21, 1996. It served as ending theme for the TBS TV program M Navi. "Jōnetsu" is regarded as the song that propelled Ua to stardom as well as being her biggest hit. With 5,700 units sold, it debuted at #60 on the Oricon Weekly Singles Chart and later peaked at #18, becoming Ua's first top 20 entry. The song was covered in a Mandarin Chinese version (Retitled "WuWuLaLaLa") by C-pop singer Coco Lee on her 1998 album, Sunny Day. In 2005, urban singer-songwriter Miliyah Katō sampled "Jōnetsu" in her song of the same name. Rock band Glim Spanky released a cover of the song digitally in 2021.

== Track listing ==
=== CD ===
No.	Title	Lyrics	Music	Arranger(s)	Length
1.	"Jōnetsu" (情熱 "Passion")	Ua	Hirofumi Asamoto	Asamoto	4:36
2.	"Denwa wo Suru Yo" (電話をするよ "Going to Make a Call")	Shin Watanabe	Watanabe	Asamoto	3:57
Total length:					8:37

=== Vinyl ===
Side A
No.	Title	Length
1.	"Jōnetsu (Smooth Mix)"
2.	"Jōnetsu (Macaron Mix)"

Side B
No.	Title	Length
1.	"Jōnetsu (Radio Mix)"
2.	"Denwa wo Suru Yo (Radio Mix)"

== Charts, certifications and sales ==
Chart (1996)	Peak position	Certifications (sales thresholds)	Sales
Japan Oricon Weekly Singles Chart	18	Gold	236,510
