= Katōmado =

Style of window in Japanese architecture

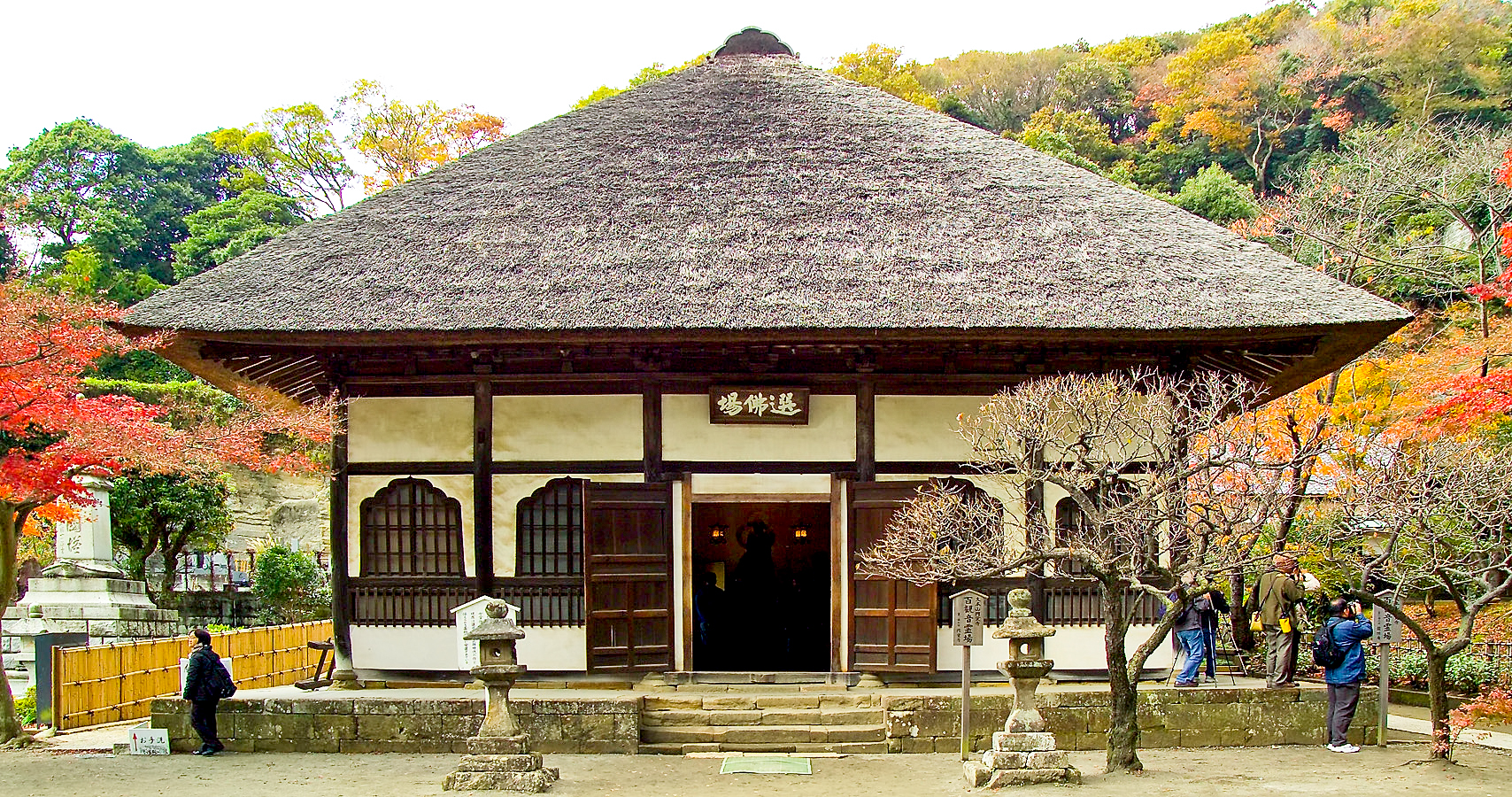
Engaku-ji, a building with old-style katōmado

Katōmado (火灯窓; lit. 'fire light window'), also written as 花頭窓・華頭窓 (lit. flower top window), is a style of pointed arch or bell-shaped window found in Japanese architecture. (Note: In English, this type of window is also simply called "cusped window".) It first arrived in Japan from China together with Zen Buddhism, as an element of Zen style architecture, but from the end of the 16th century it started to be used in temples of other Buddhist sects, Shinto shrines, castles, and samurai residences as well. The window initially was not flared, but its design and shape changed over time: the two vertical frames were widened and curves were added at the bottom. The kanji characters used for its name have also changed through the centuries, from the original "fire window" to "flower head window".

The oldest extant example of katōmado can be found in Engaku-ji's Shariden (Relic Hall) (Note: This hall was moved to its current location in 1563.(source: 壽則, 河村; 英幸, 高島 (February 2006). "Engakuji Shariden wo Rei to Shita Rekishiteki Kikōzōbutsu". Proceeding of the ... Architectural Research Meetings: Materials and Construction, Structures, Fire Safety, Environmental Engineering (76): 189–192.) The original is believed to have been built sometime between the late 14th century and the mid 15th century.(source: "National Treasure Database of Japan (国指定文化財等データベース:各棟情報詳細)".)) in Kamakura, which is thought to closely follow the original style as it was introduced to Japan, with the vertical frames touching the bottom in straight lines. Another well-known example can be found in the room called Genji-no-ma (源氏の間) in the Main Hall at Ishiyama-dera, Shiga prefecture. For this reason, katōmado are also known as genjimado (源氏窓, Genji window).

== See also ==
- Glossary of Shinto

== Notes ==
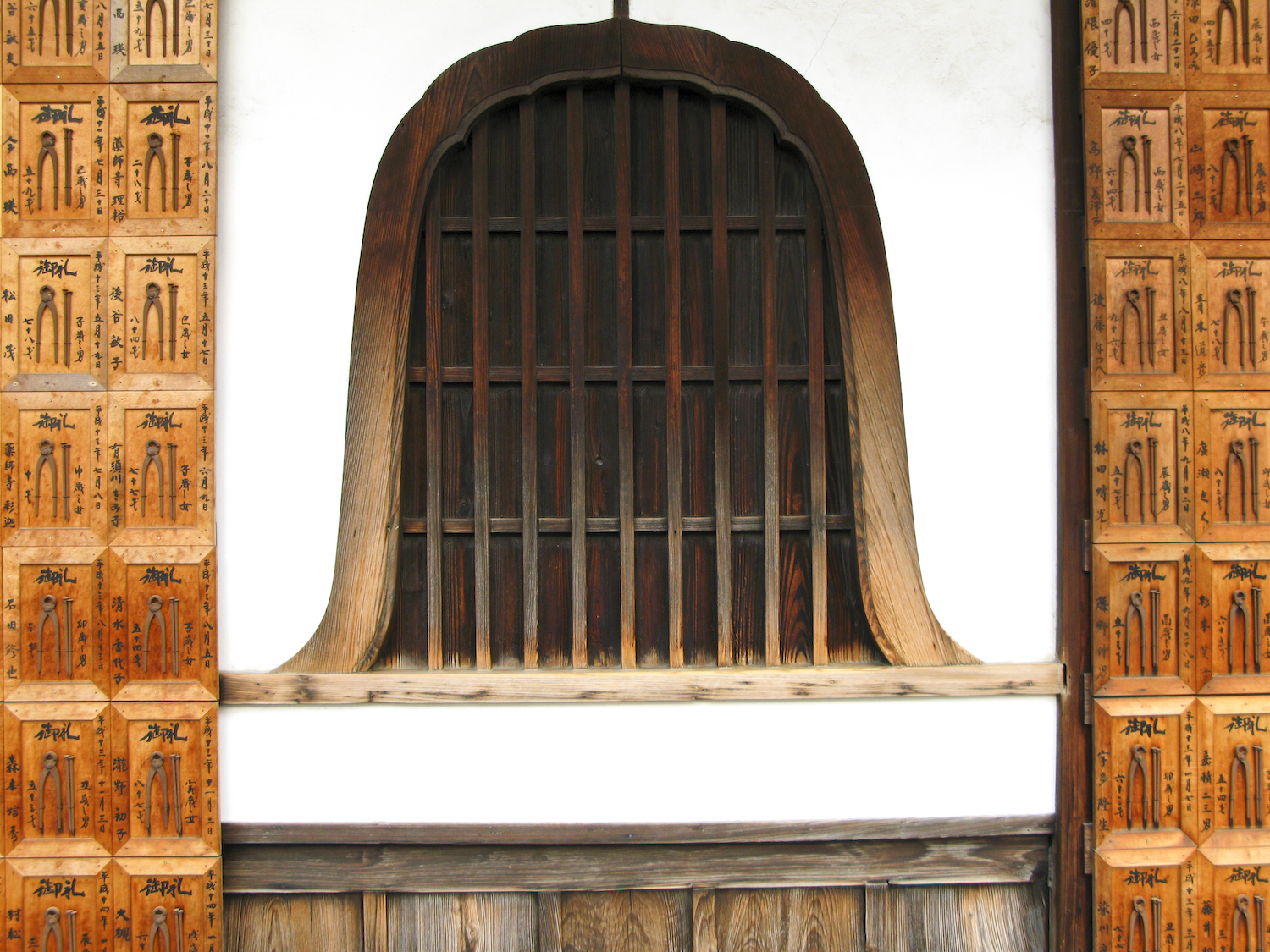
A katōmado with curves added on the sides
