= Milk Tea (Ua song) =

Single by Ua

from the album Ametora
- Released: February 25, 1998
- Recorded: 1997
- Genre: R&B, pop, jazz
- Length: 15:16
- Label: Speedstar Records
- Songwriter(s): Ua, Hirofumi Asamoto.
- Producer(s): Hirofumi Asamoto

Ua singles chronology
"Kanashimi Johnny" (1997)	"Milk Tea" (1998)	"Yuganda Taiyō" (1998)

Alternative covers
- 12" vinyl cover

"Milk Tea" (ミルクティー) is Japanese singer-songwriter Ua's ninth single, released on February 25, 1998. It was used in Yahama Sports Bike commercials. "Milk Tea" debuted at #21 on the Oricon Weekly Singles Chart with 21,690 copies sold. The music video for the song features model and TV personality Mika Ahn. The B-side "Antonio no Uta" is a Japanese-language cover of Michael Franks's "Antonio's Song".

== Track listing ==
=== CD ===
No.	Title	Lyrics	Music	Length
1.	"Milk Tea" (ミルクティー)	Ua	Hirofumi Asamoto	5:07
2.	"Antonio no Uta" (アントニオの唄 "Antonio's Song")	Michael Franks, Ua	Franks	4:50
3.	"Milk Tea (Instrumental)"		Asamoto	5:07
Total length:				15:16

=== Vinyl ===
Side A
No.	Title	Length
1.	"Milk Tea"
2.	"Milk Tea (Glassharp Mix)"
3.	"Milk Tea (Nakama Mix)"
4.	"Milk Tea (Instrumental)"

Side B
No.	Title	Length
1.	"Antonio no Uta"
2.	"Antonio no Uta (Instrumental)"

== Charts and sales ==
Chart (1998)	Peak position	Sales
Japan Oricon Weekly Singles Chart	21	61,200
