= Ua (singer) =

Japanese singer

UA
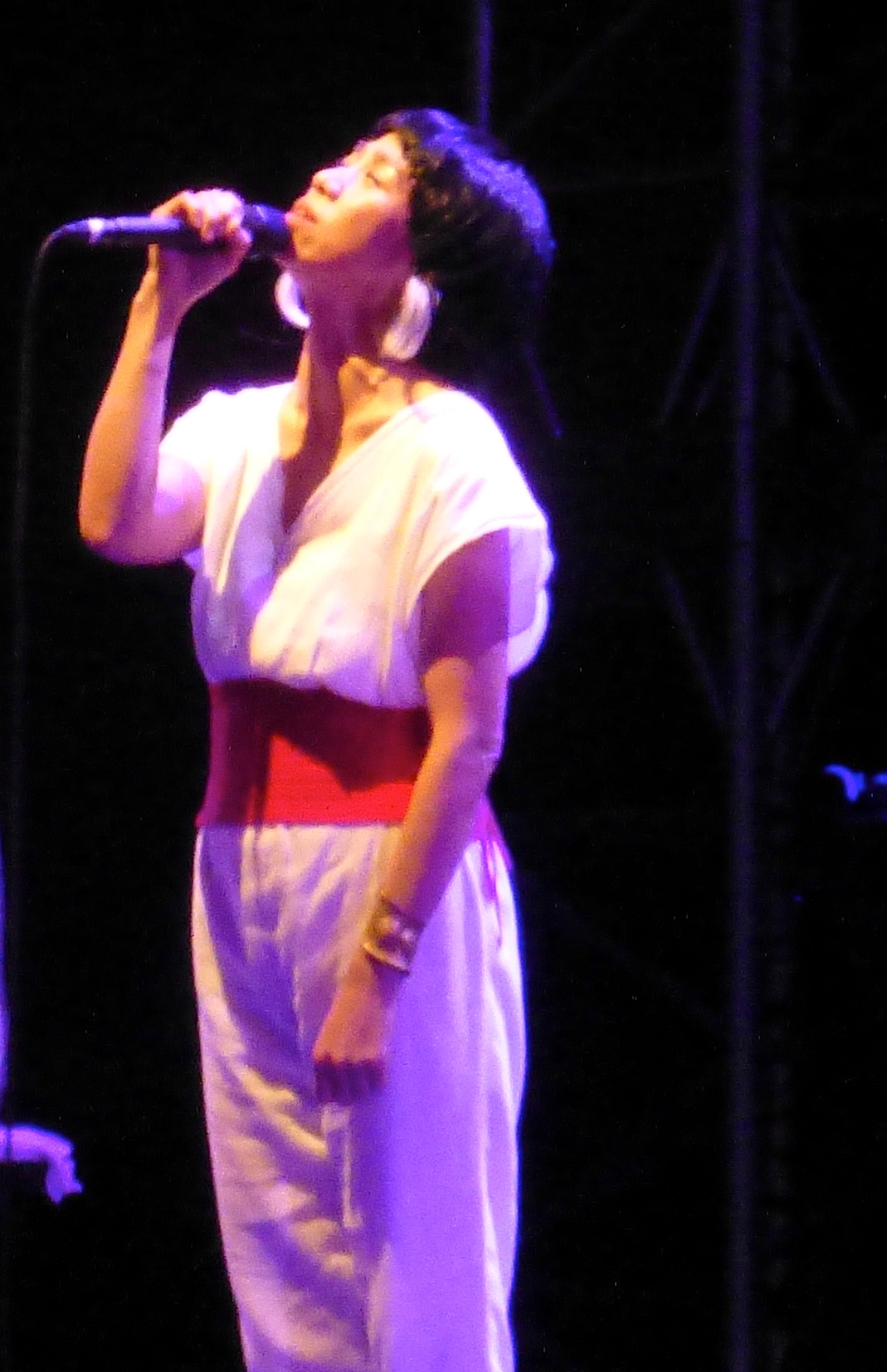
- Ua in 2016
- Born: Kaori Shima 嶋 歌織; March 11, 1972 (age 54); Suita, Osaka Prefecture, Japan
- Occupation: Singer
- Spouses: Jun Murakami (m. 1996; div. 2006) Bishū Hasegawa (m. 2008)
- Children: 4, including Nijirō
- Musical career
- Genres: Pop; jazz; electronica; alternative rock; reggae; folk
- Years active: 1994–present
- Label: Speedstar Records
- Formerly of: Ajico
- Website: uaua.jp
- Website: uaua.jp

Kaori Hasegawa (長谷川 歌織, Hasegawa Kaori) (born March 11, 1972), simply known by the stage name Ua (Japanese pronunciation: [ɯːa]), is a Japanese singer. She made her debut under Speedstar Records in 1995 with the single "Horizon". She is also the vocalist for AJICO.

== Biography ==
Ua was born Kaori Shima and grew up in Suita, Osaka. After graduating from Saga University of Arts in Kyoto, she worked as a lounge singer in Osaka. There in 1994, she was scouted by a music agency there. She took on the unusual stage name of Ua (a Swahili word that means both "flower" and "kill") and made her debut with the Hiroshi Fujiwara-produced "Horizon". Her fourth single "Jōnetsu" became a smash hit and Ua was recognized all over Japan.

After releasing her first album, 11, Ua married actor Jun Murakami and gave birth to a son, Nijirō, in 1997, who is also an actor. The couple divorced in 2006. In 2000, after two more albums, Ametora and Turbo, Ua took a hiatus from her solo work and formed the band Ajico with Kenichi Asai. She resumed her solo activities in 2002 and released her fourth album, Dorobō. The same year she made her acting debut in the leading role in the film Woman of Water, as well as contributing to the soundtrack. The film went on to win the Golden Alexander prize for Best Feature-Length Film at the International Thessaloniki Film Festival and was screened at the 2003 Cannes Film Festival.

In 2003, Ua released Illuminate: The Very Best Songs, her first compilation album. In April that year, she expanded her activities by becoming the hostess named ううあ (the pronunciation remains the same since it is meant to be a phonetic representation of her usual stagename) of an educational TV program on NHK called Do Re Mi no TV, designed to pass along Japanese traditional songs to children. Utauua, a compilation of the songs performed, was released in 2004. The same year she released her fifth album, Sun, which was mastered by Ted Jensen. In 2005, she released her sixth album, Breathe, and a compilation album of collaborations titled Nephews to mark her 10th anniversary. In 2006, Ua collaborated with renowned jazz musician Naruyoshi Kikuchi on the album Cure Jazz. In 2007, in addition to releasing her seventh album Golden Green, Ua made a second foray into acting by appearing in Hitoshi Matsumoto's directorial debut Dai Nipponjin.

In 2008, Ua revealed that she married again and gave birth to a daughter, in August. In December, she released the single "2008", followed by her eighth album, Atta, in July 2009. In April 2010, Ua released her fourth live album, entitled Haluto Live. And also in June, as a celebration for her 15th anniversary from the debut, she released a cover album “KABA”.

In 2016, over 6 years since her last album, Ua released a new original album, “JaPo”.

In 2021, AJICO restarts after 20 years and makes a big splash. Their tour sold out instantly. They also performed at the Fuji Rock Festival. “UA x Naruyoshi Kikuch” they performed at blue note. Then, in 2022, Ua released her new original album “Are U Romantic？”, In August, she played Aretha Franklin in her first Broadway musical, Janis.

In 2023, she released “Ainiikou”, which was used in a JR Tokai commercial jingle. She also wrote the lyrics for the "Kamiyama marugoto kosen" school song with Ryuichi Sakamoto.

In 2024, AJICO released a new original album, “Love no Genkei”, followed by the “AJICO no Genkei” domestic tour.

In June 2025, UA celebrated her 30th anniversary with concerts in Osaka and Tokyo.

== Discography ==
- 11 (1996)
- Ametora (1998)
- Turbo (1999)
- Dorobō (2002)
- Sun (2004)
- Breathe (2005)
- Golden Green (2007)
- Atta (2009)
- JaPo (2016)
- Newme (2026)

== Filmography ==
Film
Year	Title	Role	Notes
2002	Woman of Water	Ryo Shimizu	Lead role
2007	Dai Nipponjin	Manager Kobori	
2009	Eatrip	Herself	Documentary
Television
Year	Title	Role	Notes
2002	Shiritsu Tantei Hama Mike	Naomi	Episode 2
2003–2006	Do Re Mi no TV	Uua	
2025	Queen of Mars	Emma	Miniseries
