= List of musical artists from Japan =

This list tries to include all artists/bands from all genres originating from Japan. This list does not include artists/bands who perform in Japanese but are of different origin.

== 0–9 and symbols ==
- 12012
- 175R
- 2o Love to Sweet Bullet
- 44 Magnum
- The 5.6.7.8's
- 88Kasyo Junrei
- 9mm Parabellum Bullet
- 9Goats Black Out
- @onefive

== A ==
- AAA
- Abingdon Boys School
- A.B.'s
- Aburadako
- Access
- Acid
- Acid Android
- Acid Black Cherry
- Acid Mothers Temple
- Acidman
- ACO
- Ado
- Afilia Saga
- Ai Otsuka
- Aice5
- aiko
- Aimer
- Aimyon
- Aion
- Aira Mitsuki
- Ajico
- Akanishi Jin
- AKB48
- Akeboshi
- Aki Misato
- Akiko Suwanai
- Akiko Yano
- Akino Arai
- Akira Ifukube
- Akira Kushida
- Akishibu Project
- Aldious
- Alexandros
- ALI
- Alice Nine
- Aliene Ma'riage
- Ali Project
- Alma Kaminiito
- Ami Suzuki
- Amoyamo
- AMWE
- An Cafe
- Angela
- Angela Aki
- Angelo
- Animetal
- Annabel
- Anna S
- Anri
- Anthem
- Anti Feminism
- Aphasia
- Appare!
- Aqua Timez
- Arashi
- Asa-Chang & Junray
- Asian Kung-Fu Generation
- Astro
- Aska
- Atsushi Sakurai
- Aural Vampire
- Ayabie
- Aya Hirano
- Aya Kamiki
- Aya Ueto
- Ayaka
- Ayaka Hirahara
- Ayana
- Ayumi Hamasaki
- Ayumi Miyazaki

== B ==
- Baad
- BaBe
- Babylon
- Babymetal
- The Back Horn
- Back Number
- Back-On
- Baiser
- Bakusute Sotokanda Icchome
- Balflare
- Balzac
- Band-Maid
- Banzai Japan
- Base Ball Bear
- Bathtub Shitter
- Baroque
- BBQ Chickens
- Beat Crusaders
- The Beatniks
- BeForU
- Bellzlleb
- Bennie K
- Berryz Koubou
- Bi Kyo Ran
- BIN
- The Birthday
- Bis (Japanese rock band)
- Bite a Shock
- The Black Mages
- Blam Honey
- Blankey Jet City
- Bleach
- Blood
- Bloodthirsty Butchers
- Blood Stain Child
- The Blue Hearts
- Blues Creation
- Bomb Factory
- Bon-Bon Blanco
- Bonnie Pink
- The Boom
- Boom Boom Satellites
- Boøwy
- Boredoms
- Boris
- Bow Wow
- Boys and Men
- Brahman
- Bright
- The Brilliant Green
- Buck-Tick
- Buffalo Daughter
- Bump of Chicken
- Buono!
- By-Sexual
- B'z

== C ==
- C-ute
- Candies
- Candy Go!Go!
- The Candy Spooky Theater
- C.C.C.C.
- Cali Gari
- Camellia
- The Candy Spooky Theater
- Candy Tune
- Capsule
- The Captains
- Casiopea
- Char
- Chara
- Champloose
- Charcoal Filter
- Charlotte
- Chage
- Chage and Aska
- Chatmonchy
- Cherryblossom
- Chieko Kawabe
- Chihara Minori
- Chihiro Onitsuka
- Chirinuruwowaka
- Chisato Moritaka
- Chitose Hajime
- Chocolat
- Chottokyuu
- Chu-Z
- Church of Misery
- Cibo Matto
- Cinema Staff
- Clammbon
- ClariS
- Clear’s
- Cö Shu Nie
- Coaltar of the Deepers
- Cocco
- Cocobat
- Coldrain
- Color
- Cool Joke
- Complex
- Concerto Moon
- Core of Soul
- Cornelius
- Corrupted
- Crack Fierce
- Crossfaith
- Cross Vein
- The Cro-Magnons
- Crystal Lake
- Curio
- Cutie Street
- CY8ER
- Cymbals
- Cyntia
- Czecho No Republic

== D ==
- D
- D-51
- D=Out
- D'erlanger
- D'espairsRay
- The Dance for Philosophy
- Day After Tomorrow
- Dead End
- Deen
- The Dead Pop Stars
- Deadman
- Dear Kiss
- Deathgaze
- Def Tech
- Defspiral
- Deluhi
- Demon Kakka
- Denki Groove
- Depapepe
- Der Zibet
- Destrose
- Devil Anthem.
- Devil Kitty
- Diaura
- Die in Cries
- Diesel Guitar
- Dio – Distraught Overlord
- Dir En Grey
- Disclose
- DJ Kentaro
- DJ Krush
- DJ Sharpnel
- Do As Infinity
- Doa
- Does
- Dolly
- Doom
- Doopees
- Double
- Double Dealer
- Dragon Ash
- Dragon Head
- Dream
- Dreams Come True
- Dué le Quartz
- DuelJewel
- Duran

== E ==
- Earthshaker
- Eastern Youth
- Edge of Spirit
- Ego-Wrappin'
- Eiichi Ohtaki
- Eir Aoi
- Eikichi Yazawa
- Elephant Kashimashi
- Ellegarden
- Envy
- Especia
- Eternal Elysium
- Eve
- Eve of Destiny
- Every Little Thing
- Exile
- Exist Trace
- eX-Girl
- E-girls
- Ezo

== F ==
- f5ve
- Fact
- Fade
- Fake?
- Fantastic Plastic Machine
- Festive
- FictionJunction
- Field of View
- Filament
- Fire Bomber
- Fishmans
- Flap Girls' School
- Flame
- Flipper's Guitar
- Flow
- Flower Travellin' Band
- Flumpool
- For Tracy Hyde
- Freenote
- French Kiss
- Friction
- Fruits Zipper
- Fujifabric
- Fujii Kaze
- Fujiwara Hiroshi
- Fuki
- Fukuyama Masaharu
- Funkist
- Funky Monkey Babys
- Fushitsusha
- Fuzzy Control

== G ==
- Gacharic Spin
- Gackt
- GaGaGa SP
- Galileo Galilei
- Gallhammer
- Galneryus
- Garlic Boys
- Garnet Crow
- Garo
- Gastunk
- Gauze
- The Gazette
- Gedō
- Geinoh Yamashirogumi
- Gen Hoshino
- Genkaku Allergy
- The Gerogerigegege
- Ghost (1984 band)
- Ghost (2004 band)
- Girugamesh
- Girl Next Door
- GISM
- Glay
- Globe
- GO!GO!7188
- Gō Hiromi
- Going Under Ground
- Golden Bomber
- The Golden Cups
- Gollbetty
- Good Morning America
- Gore Beyond Necropsy
- Government Alpha
- GPKism
- Granrodeo
- Greeeen
- Greenmachine
- Grief of War
- Ground Zero
- Guitar Vader
- Guitar Wolf
- Guniw Tools

== H ==
- Halcali
- Hana
- Hanako Oku
- Hanatarash
- Hangry & Angry
- Happy End
- Haruka to Miyuki
- Haru Nemuri
- Head Phones President
- Heartsdales
- Hearts Grow
- Heath
- Heidi.
- Hello Sleepwalkers
- Hey! Say! JUMP
- Hi-Standard
- The Hiatus
- Hibari Misora
- Hidari
- Hide
- Hidehiko Hoshino
- Hideki Naganuma
- Hideki Saijo
- High and Mighty Color
- The High-Lows
- Hijokaidan
- Hikaru Kotobuki
- Hikaru Utada
- Hikashu
- Himiko Kikuchi
- Himitsu Kessha Kodomo A
- Hinatazaka46
- Hinoi Team
- Hiroko Moriguchi
- Hironobu Kageyama
- Hiroshi Kitadani
- Hiroshi Itsuki
- Hiroyuki Isobe
- Hisashi Imai
- Hitomi Shimatani
- Hitomi Takahashi
- Hitomi Yaida
- Hitoto Yo
- Hitsujibungaku
- Hizaki
- HKT48
- Hōkago Princess
- Home Made Kazoku
- Husking Bee
- HY
- Hyde

== I ==
- Ib Riad
- I Don't Like Mondays.
- Iceman
- Ichirou Mizuki
- Ichiko Aoba
- Idoling!!!
- Idol College
- Idol Renaissance
- Ikimono-gakari
- Incapacitants
- Inoue Joe
- Inoran
- Inugami Circus-dan
- Inuwasi
- IOSYS
- Ippu-Do
- Isao Sasaki
- Isao Tomita
- Hideki Ishima
- Izabel Varosa

== J ==
- J
- JAM Project
- Jacks
- Jagatara
- Janne Da Arc
- Jasmine You
- Jazztronik
- Jealkb
- Jero
- Jimsaku
- Jinn
- Jiros
- JO1
- Johnny's West
- Juice=Juice
- Judy and Mary
- Juju
- Jun
- JUNNA
- Justin Heathcliff
- Jyongri
- Jyukai

== K ==
- K.A.Z
- Kagerou
- Kagrra,
- Kahimi Karie
- Kalafina
- Kamaitachi
- Kamen Joshi
- Kami
- Kamijo
- Kamiyado
- Kana Nishino
- Kana Ueda
- Kanjani Eight
- Kannivalism
- Kanon Wakeshima
- Kaori Mochida
- KAT-TUN
- Kazumasa Hashimoto
- Keiichi Suzuki (Moonriders)
- Keiji Haino
- Keiko Masuda
- Kelun
- Kemuri
- Ken
- Ken Hirai
- Ken Ishii
- Ken Lloyd
- Kenji Ohtsuki
- Kenji Ozawa
- Kenshi Yonezu
- Ketsumeishi
- Keyakizaka46
- Keytalk
- The Kiddie
- Kikuo
- Shoukichi Kina
- King Brothers
- KinKi Kids
- Osamu Kitajima
- Kinniku Shōjo Tai
- Kis-My-Ft2
- KK Null
- Klaha
- Knock Out Monkey
- Kobukuro
- Kōenji Hyakkei
- Koichi Yamadera
- Kōji Kondō
- Kokia
- Kome Kome Club
- Korekyojinn
- Koshi Inaba
- Kotani Kinya
- Kotoko
- Kousokuya
- Közi
- Kra
- Kumi Koda
- Kuroyume
- Kusumi Koharu
- Kwon Rise
- Kyary Pamyu Pamyu
- Kyosuke Himuro
- Kyu Sakamoto

== L ==
- L'Arc-en-Ciel
- La'cryma Christi
- Lama
- Lamp
- Lareine
- Laputa
- Last Alliance
- Lazy
- Lead
- Leo Ieiri
- LiSA
- Lia
- Light Bringer
- Lindberg
- Ling Tosite Sigure
- Lite
- Little by Little
- LM.C
- Logic System
- Long Shot Party
- Love Psychedelico
- Lovebites
- Loudness
- Luke Takamura
- Luna Sea
- Luna Haruna
- Lynch

== M ==
- MAA
- Maaya Sakamoto
- Kō Machida
- The Mad Capsule Markets
- Maher Shalal Hash Baz
- Mai
- Mai Kuraki
- Make-Up
- Maki Asakawa
- Maki Nomiya
- Makiko Hirabayashi
- Malice Mizer
- Mami Kawada
- Mamoru Miyano
- Mana
- Mao Abe
- Marbell
- Mardelas
- Mari Hamada
- Mary's Blood
- Masaaki Endoh
- Masaki Shirai
- Masami Okui
- Masayuki Suzuki
- Mass of the Fermenting Dregs
- Masonna
- The Mass Missile
- Matenrou Opera
- Yumi Matsutoya
- Maximum the Hormone
- Meg
- Megamasso
- Mei Ehara
- Mejibray
- Melt-Banana
- Melody
- Merengue
- Merry
- Merzbow
- Metalucifer
- Metronome
- M-Flo
- Michiro Endo
- Midori Takada
- Mie
- Mihimaru GT
- Mika Arisaka
- Mika Nakashima
- Mikuni Shimokawa
- Miliyah Kato
- Minako Honda
- Minmi
- Misia
- Missile Innovation
- Mitski
- Miwa
- Mix Speaker's,Inc.
- Miyavi
- Moi dix Mois
- Momoiro Clover Z
- Monde Bruits
- Monkey Majik
- Mono
- Monoral
- The Mops
- Morning Musume
- Motohiro Hata
- Motoi Sakuraba
- Move
- Mr. Children
- Mucc
- Mute Beat
- Myco

== N ==
- Nagisa ni te
- Nagi Yanagi
- Masaya Nakahara
- Meiko Nakahara
- Nami Tamaki
- Namie Amuro
- Nanase Aikawa
- Nana Kitade
- Nana Mizuki
- Naoki Satō
- Natori (musician)
- Nemophila
- Neo Japonism
- NEWS
- Nightmare
- Nil
- Ningen Isu
- Nine Miles
- NiziU
- NMB48
- No Regret Life
- Nobodyknows
- Nobukazu Takemura
- Nobuo Uematsu
- Nobuo Yamada
- Nobuteru Maeda
- Nogizaka46
- Nogod
- Nokko
- Nookicky
- Noriko Tadano
- Nothing's Carved in Stone
- Number Girl
- Nico Touches the Walls
- Nujabes
- NYC
- N Zero

== O ==
- Oblivion Dust
- Oceanlane
- Off Course
- Okuda Tamio
- Oldcodex
- Onmyo-Za
- On/Off
- The Oral Cigarettes
- Orange Range
- Oreskaband
- One Ok Rock
- OOIOO
- Otomo Yoshihide
- Outrage

== P ==
- P-Model
- Panic Channel
- Paris Match
- Party Rockets GT
- Pasocom Music Club
- Pata
- Pay Money to My Pain
- Peelander-Z
- The Pees
- Penicillin
- Perfume
- Phantasmagoria
- Phantom Siita
- The Piass
- Pierrot
- Piggs
- Piko
- The Pillows
- Pink Lady
- Pizzicato Five
- Plastic Tree
- Plastics
- Plenty
- Plus-Tech Squeeze Box
- Polysics
- Porno Graffitti
- Potshot
- Prague
- The Predators
- predia
- Princess Princess
- Prism
- Psy-S
- Psycho le Cému
- Puffy AmiYumi
- Pyg

== Q ==
- Qp-Crazy
- Queen Bee
- Qumali Depart
- Quruli

== R ==
- Radwimps
- Rain
- Rami
- Rankin' Taxi
- Raphael
- Ray
- Ray
- RC Succession
- Rebecca
- Rei Harakami
- Remioromen
- Rentrer en Soi
- Rice
- Rie fu
- Rikiji
- Rimi Natsukawa
- Rina Aiuchi
- Rina Sawayama
- Ringo Sheena
- Ringwanderung
- Rip Slyme
- Ritual Carnage
- Riyu Kosaka
- Rize
- The Rodeo Carburettor
- Rolly Teranishi
- The Roosters
- Round Table
- Rovo
- Ruins
- Run&Gun
- Rurutia
- Ryuichi Kawamura
- Ryuichi Sakamoto

== S ==
- Sabbat
- Saber Tiger
- Sadie
- Sadistic Mika Band
- Sads
- Sakanaction
- Saki Kubota
- Sakura
- Sakura Gakuin
- Sambomaster
- Sandii & the Sunsetz
- Saori@destiny
- Sarina Suno
- Satsuki
- Sayuri
- Scanch
- Scandal
- The Scanty
- Scha Dara Parr
- Schaft
- School Food Punishment
- Schwarz Stein
- Schwein
- Screw
- The Something
- Seagull Screaming Kiss Her Kiss Her
- See-Saw
- Seiichi Yamamoto
- Seiji Ozawa
- Seikima-II
- Serial TV Drama
- Sex Machineguns
- Sexy Zone
- Shakkazombie
- Shanadoo
- Sharam Q
- Sheena & The Rokkets
- Shigeru Izumiya
- Shiina Ringo
- Shilfee and Tulipcorobockles
- Shinichi Ishihara
- Shinichi Osawa
- Shinya Yamada
- Shonen Knife
- Show-Ya
- Showtaro Morikubo
- Shugo Tokumaru
- Siam Shade
- Sid
- Sigh
- Silent Poets
- SKE48
- Skin
- SMAP
- Snowkel
- Softball
- Soft Ballet
- Soil & "Pimp" Sessions
- Solmania
- Sons of All Pussys
- Sophia
- Soul Flower Union
- Soulhead
- Sound Horizon
- Southern All Stars
- Sowelu
- SpecialThanks
- The Spiders
- Spitz
- Splay
- Spyair
- The Stalin
- Stance Punks
- Stereopony
- Stomu Yamashta
- Sug
- Sugizo
- Suga Shikao
- Suneohair
- Sunmyu
- Sunny Day Service
- SunSet Swish
- Supercar
- Super Beaver
- Super Bell"Z
- Super Junky Monkey
- Surf Coasters
- Susumu Hirasawa
- Sweet Steady
- The System of Alive
- Syu

== T ==
- T-Square
- Taiji Sawada
- Takagi Masakatsu
- Takako Minekawa
- Takayuki Miyauchi
- Tak Matsumoto
- Takeshi Terauchi
- Taki Rentaro
- Tamurapan
- Tanpopo
- Tackey & Tsubasa
- Taeko Onuki
- Taia
- Taj Mahal Travellers
- Tatsuya Ishii
- Team Syachihoko
- Tegomass
- The Tempters
- Tenniscoats
- Teppei Koike
- Teriyaki Boyz
- Terra
- Terra Rosa
- Teru
- Tetra-Fang
- Tetsu Takano
- Tetsuya
- Tetsuya Komuro
- Theatre Brook
- Thee Michelle Gun Elephant
- Thug Murder
- Thyme
- The Tigers
- TM Network
- TM Revolution
- Toe
- Jun Togawa
- Tohoshinki
- TOKIO
- Toko Yasuda
- Tokyo Jihen
- Tokyo Ska Paradise Orchestra
- Tokyo Yankees
- Toll Yagami
- Tommy February6
- Tommy Heavenly6
- Tatsuro Yamashita
- Tomohisa Yamashita
- Tomoyasu Hotei
- Toshi
- Tourbillon
- Towa Tei (of Deee-Lite)
- Tricot
- TrySail
- Tsunku
- Tujiko Noriko
- TUBE
- Two-Mix
- Tyrant

== U ==
- Ua
- Yuya Uchida
- Ulfuls
- Ultra Living
- Umineco Sounds
- Under Graph
- United
- United Future Organization
- Unsraw
- Urbangarde
- Uverworld

== V ==
- V6
- Vajra
- Valshe
- Vamps
- Varuna
- Vaundy
- Versailles
- Vidoll
- Violet UK
- Vistlip
- Vivid
- Vivisick
- Vodka Collins

== W ==
- W
- Wada Kouji
- Wands
- Wasuta
- WaT
- White Ash
- Whiteberry
- Wink
- Wino
- World's End Girlfriend
- World Order
- wowaka
- Wyse
- W-inds

== X ==
- X Japan

== Y ==
- Yahyel
- Mai Yajima
- Yamaguchi Kappei
- Joe Yamanaka
- Yann Tomita
- Yasuha
- Yellow Generation
- Yellow Magic Orchestra
- The Yellow Monkey
- Yoasobi
- Yoichiro Yoshikawa
- Yoko Kanno
- Yoko Ono
- Yoko Takahashi
- Yoohei Kawakami
- Yorushika
- Yōsei Teikoku
- Yoshida Brothers
- Kazuya Yoshii
- Yoshiki
- Yoshiki Fukuyama
- Yoshino Nanjo
- Yoshinori Sunahara
- Yoshioka Yui
- Yuria
- Yui
- Yui Aragaki
- Yui Horie
- YuiKaori
- Yui Makino
- Yukari Fresh
- Yuki Isoya
- Yukihiro
- Yumemiru Adolescence
- Yuna Ito
- Yura Yura Teikoku
- Yuri Kasahara
- Yūta Furukawa
- Yutaka Higuchi
- Yuya Matsushita
- Yūzō Kayama
- Yuzu

== Z ==
- Zard
- Zazel
- Zazen Boys
- Zeebra
- Zelda
- Zeni Geva
- Zeppet Store
- Zi:Kill
- Zigzo
- Zone
- Zoobombs
- Zoro
- Zutomayo
- Zwei

== See also ==
- J-pop
- Japanese hardcore
- Japanese hip hop
- Japanese metal
- Japanoise
- List of J-pop artists
- List of Japanese hip hop musicians
- Music of Japan
- Shibuya-kei
- Visual kei
