= Apple Music Up Next =

Monthly promotion program and web series

- Promotional titlecard
- Genre: Reality
- Based on: ITunes New Artist Spotlight
- Directed by: Taylor Cohen
- Presented by: Zane Lowe; Jimmy Iovine
- Country of origin: United States
- Original language: English

Production
- Producer: Tara Razavi

Original release
- Network: Apple Music
- Release: August 17, 2017 – present

Apple Music: Up Next is a monthly program published by Apple Music aimed at identifying, showcasing and elevating rising star talent. Each month, Apple Music's editorial team selects an artist to promote in order to raise global awareness of the artist and further to grow the artist's audience. In August 2017, Apple Music premiered a monthly mini-documentary series chronicling the artists' journey, inspiration and influences. Each season of the Apple Music-exclusive ends with interviews and live performances called Up Next Sessions. Each selected artist will receive a performance slot on either The Late Late Show with James Corden, or Jimmy Kimmel Live!, in addition to an Apple Music-exclusive extended play of their Up Next live performances. Artists who have previously been given the title are Billie Eilish, Khalid, Jessie Reyez, Bad Bunny, Sigrid, Clairo, and Daniel Caesar.

The platform also succeeds and is closely related to iTunes New Artist Spotlight which was active during the mid 2010s. Apple Music introduced an equivalent of the program for Sub-Saharan Africa titled "New Artist Spotlight" in 2019.

== Artists ==
=== 2010s ===
Year	Artist	Month	Ref
2017	6lack	April 2017	
2017	Sigrid	May 2017	
2017	Khalid	June 2017	
2017	Mr Eazi	July 2017	
2017	Daniel Caesar	August 2017	
2017	Billie Eilish	September 2017	
2017	Sabrina Claudio	October 2017	
2017	Amy Shark	November 2017	
2018	Stefflon Don	January 2018	
2018	Bad Bunny	March 2018	
2018	Bazzi	April 2018	
2018	Juice Wrld	July 2018	
2018	Jax Jones	August 2018	
2018	Greta Van Fleet	September 2018	
2018	NCT 127	October 2018	
2018	H.E.R.	November 2018	
2019	Summer Walker	January 2019	
2019	Tierra Whack	February 2019	
2019	Dean Lewis	March 2019	
2019	Pink Sweats	April 2019	
2019	Koffee	May 2019	
2019	Megan Thee Stallion	June 2019	
2019	Burna Boy	July 2019	
2019	Clairo	August 2019	
2019	Lunay	September 2019	
2019	Jessie Reyez	November 2019	

=== 2020s ===
Year	Artist	Month	Ref
2020	Orville Peck	January 2020	
2020	Victoria Monét	February 2020	
2020	Ingrid Andress	March 2020	
2020	Conan Gray	April 2020	
2020	Don Toliver	May 2020	
2020	Rema	June 2020	
2020	Benee	July 2020	
2020	Holly Humberstone	August 2020	
2020	Natanael Cano	September 2020	
2020	Giveon	October 2020	
2020	Beabadoobee	November 2020	
2021	Arlo Parks	February 2021	
2021	Tate McRae	March 2021	
2021	Zoe Wees	April 2021	
2021	Morray	May 2021	
2021	Fousheé	June 2021	
2021	Amorphous	July 2021	
2021	Maisie Peters	August 2021	
2021	Tems	September 2021	
2021	Parker McCollum	October 2021	
2022	Jay Wheeler	February 2022	
2022	Shenseea	March 2022	
2022	Omar Apollo	April 2022	
2022	Jvck James	May 2022	
2022	Aespa	June 2022	
2022	Yahritza y Su Esencia	July 2022	
2022	Amelia Moore	August 2022	
2022	Flo	September 2022	
2022	SoFaygo	October 2022	
2023	Bailey Zimmerman	January 2023	
2023	GloRilla	March 2023	
2023	Saint Harrison	May 2023	
2023	Ice Spice	July 2023	
2023	Grupo Frontera	October 2023	
2024	Teezo Touchdown	January 2024	
