= Key party =

Key party may refer to:

- Key party, a purported type of swinging event
- Key signing party, an event at which people present cryptographic keys to others in person for identity verification
- Key Party Records, a Japanese record label founded in 1997
- "Key Party" (Will & Grace), a 2004 television series episode
- "Key Party", a 2020 episode of Betty
- Key Party (Turkey), a political party in Turkey
