= Metronom =

Metronom may refer to:

- Metronom (film), a 2022 Romanian film
- Metronom Eisenbahngesellschaft, a German railway company
- Metronom Theater, in Oberhausen, Germany

== See also ==
- Metronome (disambiguation)
