= Hidari =

Hidari is the Japanese word for "left" or "left hand side"

- Hidari (skipper), a butterfly
- Hidari (band)

== People ==
- Bokuzen Hidari (左 卜全 1894–1971) Japanese actor and comedian
- Hidari Jingorō (左 甚五郎) was a possibly fictitious Japanese artist, sculptor and carpenter
- Sachiko Hidari (左 幸子 1930–2001) Japanese film actress
