= Tempest (Balflare album) =

Studio album by Balflare
- Released: 2006
- Genre: Power metal
- Length: 46 min 52 s
- Label: Soundholic

Balflare chronology
Thousands of Winters of Flames (2005)	Tempest (2006)	Sleeping Hollow (2008)

Tempest is Balflare's second album, released in 2006.

== Track listing ==
1. Awakening - (04:49)
2. End This Misery - (03:56)
3. Hollow the Dusk - (01:12)
4. Out Break - (06:06)
5. Toward Fall - (04:25)
6. Burning Wild - (03:55)
7. A False Charge - (04:33)
8. Storm Lord - (04:05)
9. Reaching for the Sky - (04:27)
10. Black Raven - (04:59)
11. End of Time - (04:25)

== Personnel ==
- Eijin Kawazoe - vocals
- Leo Yabumoto - guitar
- Syuta Hashimoto - guitar and keyboards
- Ayuko Hayano - keyboards
- Takashi Odaira - bass
- Isao Matsuzaki - drums
