= Serial TV Drama =

Japanese band

- Origin: Japan
- Years active: 2004–2012
- Labels: Sony Records; Steezlab Music
- Members: Satoshi Tokizaki; Arai Hiroki; Shotaro Okada; Goh Inamasu; Futoshi Kondo
- Website: http://www.serialtvdrama.com/index.html

Serial TV Drama (stylized as serial TV drama) （シリアル・ティーヴィー・ドラマ）is a Japanese band that was formed in 2004, managed by Sony Music Records Inc. and under Steezlab Music. The group consists of five members Hiroki Arai (新井 弘毅 Arai Hiroki), Shotaro Okada (岡田 翔太朗 Okada Shōtarō), Satoshi Tokizaki (鴇崎 智史 Tokizaki Satoshi), Goh Inamasu (稲増 五生 Inamasu Goh), and Futoshi Kondo (近藤 太 Kondō Futoshi).

== History ==
The band was formed in January 2004 in Saitama Prefecture, and became active in LIVE activities in May. The drummer was replaced twice, and vocalist once. As of 2010 August, the band continued performing with the current members.

The songs are first written by guitarist Arai, and then rearranged after discussing with other members to fit all of them. After that, the lyrics are filled in.

Guitarists Arai and Inamasu were students of the same year in university. Besides that, guitarist Inamasu and bassist Kondo studied in the same highschool and shared a junior-senior relationship, whereas drummer Okada and vocalist Tokizaki were in a band which had collaborated with Serial TV Drama in the past. Bands that are in good relationships with Serial TV Drama include 竹内電気 (takeuchidenki), the telephones, and Totalfat

On 9 April, 2010, their official site was officially renewed, and the release of their new debut album was announced on their website. On March 24, 2012, Serial TV Drama disbanded following their final live show at Shimokitazawa Garden.

== Members ==
- Hiroki Arai (新井 弘毅 Arai Hiroki）

Guitarist and songwriter. Leader of the band when it was first formed in 2004. He reveres Extreme's guitarist Nuno Bettencourt. Although he is left-handed, he uses his right hand when playing the guitar.

- Goh Inamasu (稲増 五生 Inamasu Goh)

Guitarist of the band. In September 2004, after withdrawing from playing the support guitar, he heard that Arai was recruiting new members. He was rejected as first, but in the end, together with Kondo, persuaded Arai into letting them join the band.

- Futoshi Kondo (近藤 太 Kondō Futoshi)

He is the bassist of the band. One week before their first live performance, the former bassist informed that he was not able to be there, resulting in Arai consulting Kondo. Kondo, who went to Tokyo for university at that time, was asked by Arai to be their support bassist. After the live ended, he officially joined the group.

- Shotaro Okada (岡田 翔太朗 Okada Shōtarō)

Drummer of the band. In 2006, Okada was planning to with withdraw from drumming along with the disbandment of the band he was in. However, he eventually joined the recruit accordingly.

- Satoshi Tokizaki (鴇崎 智史 Tokizaki Satoshi)

Vocalist of the band. He is also the guitarist and vocalist of Japanese band the court (currently on hiatus), nicknamed Totsu-san (totsu means convex). With former vocalist Ito's sudden decision to leave the band, Tokizaki performed as a guest vocalist in Rock in Japan Festival 2010. After that, he officially joined Serial TV Drama on the 8th of August 2010, the news was announced on their renewed site.

== Discography ==
Singles

- 「ユニコーンの角」(November 2010)
- 「愛が止まらない‐Turn It Into Love‐」(March 2011)
- 「桃源郷エイリアン」(June 2011) - 9th opening theme of anime Gin Tama

Albums

- 「マストバイ」(July 2011)

== See also ==
- List of bands from Japan
