= ITunes New Artist Spotlight =

iTunes playlist

iTunes New Artist Spotlight is a list of featured new artists' releases organized by genre. The list is decided upon by iTunes editorial staff based on various factors sometimes including pre-order sales, musical quality and length of time artist has been active.

== United States ==
=== 2015 ===
| Artist | Song title |
|---|---|
| Natalie La Rose | Somebody |
| Peking Duk | High |
| Susanne Sundfør | Fade Away |
| Hayden James | Something About You |
| Whilk & Misky | Babe I'm Yours |
| Kat Dahlia | Crazy |
| Petite Noir | Chess |
| Mikky Ekko | Time |
| Royal | Passenger |
| T. O. L. D. | Lucifer's Eyes |
| Niia | Body |
| Sam Hunt | Break Up in a Small Town |
| Tove Styrke | Borderline |
| AronChupa | I'm an Albatraoz |

== United Kingdom ==
=== 2011 ===
- Alice Gold
- Benjamin Francis Leftwich
- Clare Maguire
- Gypsy & The Cat
- James Blake
- Jamie Woon
- Jessie J
- Katy B
- Summer Camp
- The Joy Formidable
- The Vaccines
- Treefight for Sunlight

=== 2012 ===
- Dry the River
- Emeli Sandé
- Keaton Henson
- Kindness
- Labrinth
- Lana Del Rey
- Lianne La Havas
- Maverick Sabre
- Michael Kiwanuka
- Niki & The Dove
- The Staves
- Totally Enormous Extinct Dinosaurs

=== 2013 ===
- Azealia Banks
- Bastille
- Daughter
- Disclosure
- Foxes
- Gabrielle Aplin
- Haim
- Kodaline
- Laura Mvula
- Rudimental
- Syron
- The 1975

=== 2014 ===
- BANKS
- Chlöe Howl
- Dan Croll
- George Ezra
- Josh Record
- Laura Welsh
- Luke Sital-Singh
- MØ
- Saint Raymond
- Sam Smith
- Sampha
- Say Lou Lou
- SOHN
- Wolf Alice

=== 2015 ===
- Becky Hill
- Ben Khan
- Circa Waves
- Ibeyi
- James Bay
- Josef Salvat
- MNEK
- Nothing but Thieves
- SOAK
- Years & Years

=== 2016 ===
- Billie Marten
- Blossoms
- Clean Cut Kid
- Frances
- Jack Garratt
- Låpsley
- Mura Masa
- NAO
- Rationale
- Spring King
- The Japanese House
- Zak Abel

=== 2017 ===
- AJ Tracey
- Dan Caplen
- DAVE
- Declan McKenna
- Jorja Smith
- JP Cooper
- Liv Dawson
- Rag'n'Bone Man
- Ray BLK
- Raye
- The Amazons
- The Magic Gang

== Japan ==
=== 2013 ===
- Aoi Yamazaki
- CHEESE CAKE
- Haruka to Miyuki
- Huwie Ishizaki
- Kuroki Nagisa
- nicoten
- Passepied
- Rina Sumioka
- Samezame
- Tofubeats
- Tricot
- Yoh Shibusawa

=== 2014 ===
- Ailee
- banvox
- BLUE ENCOUNT
- Charisma.com
- Fhána
- KEYTALK
- Rei Yasuda
- Shiori Niiyama
- Suck a Stew Dry
- TANAKA ALICE
- USAGI
- WHITE JAM
