= Kazuki Watanabe (musician) =

Japanese musician

Kazuki

Background information
- Also known as: Kazuki (華月)
- Born: Kazuki Watanabe (渡辺和樹); April 7, 1981; Shibuya, Tokyo, Japan
- Died: October 31, 2000 (aged 19) Ebisu, Shibuya
- Genres: Progressive rock; art rock; symphonic rock
- Occupations: Musician; guitarist; songwriter
- Instrument: Guitar
- Years active: 1995–2000
- Formerly of: Raphael; Yuri Juujidan
- Website: Official site

Kazuki Watanabe (渡辺和樹, Watanabe Kazuki; April 7, 1981 – October 31, 2000), known by his stage name Kazuki (華月), was a Japanese musician known as guitarist and lead songwriter of the visual kei rock band Raphael. The group became quite popular, with all their releases entering the top 40 of the Oricon chart, before disbanding after Kazuki died at the age of 19.

== Life ==
Kazuki Watanabe was born on April 7, 1981, in Shibuya, Tokyo. After playing some roles in a few TV programs and a film, he went on to have a musical career. In 1995, he and bassist Yukito formed a punk cover band which covered songs by bands such as The Blue Hearts and Ramones. In 1996, Kazuki and Yukito both soon began writing original material, and later formed Raphael in 1997, whose members were all just 15 years old. In only three years time they were popular enough to headline the Nippon Budokan.

He also had a side-project called Yuri Juujidan (百合十字団), a band consisted of Kazuki (vocals), Kuruto (ex-Pleur) on bass and Mask on guitar. All of their songs are instrumental because Kazuki died before he could record his voice. On October 31, 2000, he was found dead in his room located in Ebisu, Shibuya. He was 19 years old. The cause of death was reported as a sedative overdose, according to the Shibuya Police in Tokyo.

After his death, Raphael disbanded in January 2001. In 2012, they reunited for two concerts on October 31 (Kazuki's 12th death anniversary) and November 1, and released a re-recording of their hit 1999 song "Eternal Wish (Todokanu Kimi e)" as a single.
