= Ghost (2004 band) =

Japanese visual kei rock band

- Origin: Japan
- Genres: Gothic rock; hard rock
- Years active: 2004–2007
- Label: Fuji Production
- Past members: Hisui; Yu; Syo~ji; Rin; Kousei; Yura; Zero; Kisara
- Website: Ghost-web.net

Ghost (often stylized as GHOST) was a visual kei rock band from Japan. They started activity in 2004, and changed lineup several times.

== Musical styles ==
Their sound is often described as melodic, but they also have elements of hard rock and gothic rock. They disbanded in 2007 after the departure of guitarist Hisui.

== Biography ==
Ghost was formed in 2004 as a part of the boom of new visual kei bands. The original lineup consisted of vocalist Kousei, Hisui and Syo~ji on guitars and drummer Rin. In May of the same year, they were joined by Zero on bass guitar. Their first single, higyaku no shiro, was released in December.

In 2005, Ghost lost two of its members; Syo~ji and Rin. Shortly after, they were joined by Yu on drums and Yura (ex-Devil Kitty) on guitar. However, Yu quit the band in November 2005. The band continued to play with several support drummers, while releasing their first mini-album, Bi-zarre Collector. In 2005 Ghost also performed their first one-man concert, at Takadanobaba Arena.

Ghost's first full album, Tsumi to batsu Brand New Capsule XIV was released in December 2006. By then, they had recruited a new drummer, Kisara from the band Delta Ark.

In 2007, they released two new singles titled Blue Cloud and akai kumo. During their concert at Shibuya Club Quattro on August 25th, the band announced that Hisui would be leaving Ghost. After that concert, it was decided that Ghost would disband. Their last live was held at Takadanobaba Area on December 6, 2007, and they released a compilation album titled The Best of Ghost on December 12.

== Members ==
- Kousei – vocals (2004–2007)
- Yura – guitar (2005–2007)
- Zero (零, Rei) – bass guitar (2004–2007)
- Kisara – drums (2006–2007)

Former members

- Rin (輪) – drums (2004–2005)
- Syo~ji – guitar (2004–2005)
- Yu (裕) – drums (2005-2005)
- Hisui (ひすい) – guitar (2004–2007)

== Discography ==
=== Albums and EPs ===
- Bi-zarre Collector (December 21, 2005)
- Tsumi to batsu Brand New Capsule XIV (罪と罰 Brand New Capsule XIV, December 20, 2006)
- The Best of Ghost (December 12, 2007)

=== Singles ===
- Higyaku no shiro (被虐ノ城, December 15, 2004)
- Kousoku no kan (拘束ノ棺, May 10, 2005)
- For Dear (May 10, 2006)
- Kuchihateta kumo no sujou (朽チ果テタ蜘蛛ノ巣城, August 23, 2006)
- Dead or Dead: Silence of Species (June 27, 2007)
- Dead or Dead: Creature Eden...to Sadness (June 27, 2007)
- Akai kumo (赫い蜘蛛, August 29, 2007)
- Blue Cloud (August 29, 2007)

=== DVDs ===
- Theater of Underworld (February 21, 2007)

=== Others ===
- Confinement party (August 1, 2005)
- Yurikago wa madoromi (Short Ver.) (ゆりかごは微睡み(Short Ver.), August 3, 2006)
- Theater of Haunted Carnival Vol.3 (December 14, 2006)
- Hajimete no offshoot shuu (初めてのオフショット集, May 10, 2007)
- Oboreru sakana (溺れる魚, August 25, 2007)
- Red Thread (December 12, 2014)
