= Yann Tomita =

Yann Tomita ヤン 富田
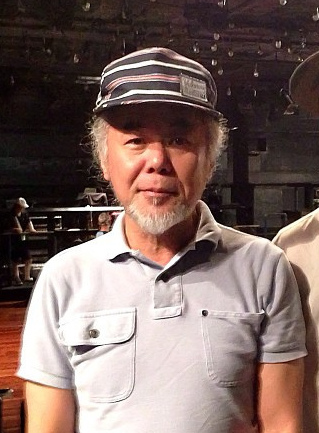
- Tomita in 2013

Background information
- Also known as: Yang Tomita; De Yanns; Dr. Yann; Forever Yann; Dr. Domestic
- Born: October 1952 (age 73); Tokyo, Japan
- Genres: Exotica, electronic, hip hop, musique concrète, experimental, avant-garde
- Occupations: Composer, performer, instrumentalist, producer
- Instruments: Vocals, piano, synthesizer, steel drums
- Years active: 1980s-present
- Labels: ASL Research Service; For Life Records; Sony Records; CCRE

Yann Tomita (ヤン富田; born October 1952) is a Japanese musician, composer, record producer, writer, and steelpan player based in Tokyo. In Japan during the 1980s and 1990s, he pioneered various music genres, including hip hop, dub, acid jazz, exotica, and electronic music. He is the first professional Japanese steelpan player, first Japanese hip hop producer, and the president and founder of the record label Audio Science Laboratory.

== Biography ==
Tomita was first introduced to steelpan drums through a 1970s Van Dyke Parks album, and subsequently traveled to Trinidad and Tobago to learn how to play them. He later performed with Parks onstage during the late 1980s, playing steel pan. He was a member of Water Melon Group, led by Toshio Nakanishi of Plastics fame. He also mixed, arranged, and co-produced Seiko Ito's MESS/AGE (1989) album, which has been cited as one of the pioneering works in Japanese hip hop. Since the early 1990s, Tomita has pursued a music brand of cosmic kitsch, using synthesizers, steelpan drums, exotica and musique concrète.

His 1995 work, Doopee Time, is a Space age pop concept album, that follows the members Suzi Kim (played by Suzi Kim) and Caroline Novac (played by Yumiko Ohno of Buffalo Daughter) of the fictitious Japanese vocal duo "Doopees". It was recorded with drummer Chica Ogawa, and credited simply as Doopees. In it, he blended elements of Space Age exotica with steel drums, electronics, and tributes to Sun Ra, Chopin, the Beach Boys, and Phil Spector. A follow-up to the album, titled Doopee Time 2, was meant for release on July 28, 2006. According to Tomita, the album was worked on every day for about half a year, but had to be postponed indefinitely due to a two-month hospital stay amidst other circumstances.

Besides Doopees, he has also worked with a variety of music artists, including Grandmaster Flash, Boredoms, Kahimi Karie, Ippu-Do, Cymbals, Kyōko Koizumi, Tomoyuki Tanaka, Fantastic Plastic Machine, Hiroshi Fujiwara. Nigo, Towa Tei, Ryuichi Sakamoto, Cornelius, Toruman, Pardon Kimura, Kirinji, Yasuko Agawa, and Martin Denny.

Tomita is also known for his idiosyncratic stage performances, which have included demonstrations of an antique Serge modular synth, a "Biofeedback System", and a "Mind Disintegrator & Space Light Probe Phaser". As of 2013, he continues to perform live at music venues with Suzi Kim, Yumiko Ohno, and various others.

== Discography ==
=== Studio albums ===
Year	Title	Notes
1992	Music For Astro Age: Released: November 1, 1992; Label: Sony Records	Packaged in two-CD set.
1994	Happy Living: Released: July 21, 1994; Label: Sony Records	Credited to Astro Age Steel Orchestra
1995	Doopee Time: Released: October 20, 1995; Label: For Life Records	Credited to Doopees
1998	Music For Living Sound: Released: May 21, 1998; Label: For Life Records	Packaged with three CDs, one CD-ROM, and a 32-page booklet mostly in English with some Japanese.; Included collaborations with Grandmaster Flash, Ossie Colon, and others.
2008	Forever Yann Music Meme 4 – Variations: Released: April 23, 2008; Label: CCRE, ASL Research Service	Packaged with 110+ page book, a sticker for never-to-be-released second Doopees album (Doopee Time 2: Monalisa) and a Yann Tomita leaf sticker. Also included a DVD recorded live at Myouhon-ji Temple, Kamakura, Kanagawa on May 27, 2006.; Features Kahimi Karie. Cymbals, Naives, Doopees, Kyōko Koizumi, and Linda Yamamoto.

=== EPs ===
Year	Title	Notes
1996	Dooits!: Released: May 17, 1996; Label: For Life Records	Credited to Doopees
2006	Forever Yann Music Meme 2: Released: May 25, 2006; Label: ASL Research Service	Features Doopees and Naives
2006	Forever Yann Music Meme 3: Released: September 20, 2006; Label: ASL Research Service	Credited to Doopees

=== Live album ===
Year	Title	Notes
2000	An Adventure of Inevitable Chance: Released: June 25, 2000; Label: P-Vine Records	Recorded at the Porco Theater in Tokyo on April 12, 1993 and April 12, 1993.; Presented as a two-CD set in a clear plastic case with two booklets. The second CD (entitled Heart Beat) is made of cardboard and has an accompanying booklet.

== Publications ==
- Forever Yann Music Meme 1 (2006)
- Yann Tomita A.S.L. Space Agency (2010)
- Forever Yann Music Meme 5 (2014)

== See also ==
- Music of Japan
- List of musical artists from Japan
