= Thousands of Winters of Flames =

Studio album by Balflare
- Released: 2005
- Genre: Power metal
- Length: 40 min 02 s
- Label: Hidden Maniacs

Balflare chronology
Thousands of Winters of Flames (2005)	Tempest (2006)

Thousands of Winters of Flames is Balflare's debut album, released in 2005.

== Track listing ==
1. Flare of Dusk - (01:00)
2. Hunt and Brave - (06:22)
3. Storm Mind -(04:15)
4. Shadows - (01:00)
5. Bind Blaze - (05:14)
6. Dead Fall - (04:24)
7. Four Hundred Years - (03:33)
8. Thousands of Winters of Flames - (09:10)
9. Sound of Silence - (05:04)

== Personnel ==
- Hideki Tada - vocals
- Syuta Hashimoto - guitar and keyboards
- Takashi Odaira - bass
- Isao Matsuzaki - drums
