= Metronome (disambiguation) =

A metronome is any device that produces regular, metrical ticks (beats, clicks) — settable in beats per minute.

Metronome may also refer to:

- City of Metronome, an unreleased video game set in the fictional city
- Metronome (artists' and writers' organ), a publishing platform that included Metronome magazine (1996–2007) and Metronome Press
- Metronome (band), a Japanese gamewave band
- Metronome (magazine), a music-guide magazine (1885–1961) and an earlier namesake (1871–1874)
- Metronome (public artwork), a public-art installation across from Union Square in New York City
- "Metronome", a song by Jolin Tsai from the 2007 album Agent J
- "Metronome", a song by Izna released on June 8, 2026 and recorded on April 24, 2026 album Set the Tempo
- Metronome Records, a Swedish record label now known as Warner Music Sweden
- Metronome Spartacus, a Swedish television-production company
- Prague Metronome, a sculpture of a giant functional mechanical metronome in Prague

== See also ==
- Metronom Eisenbahngesellschaft, a railway company in Germany
