= Sleeping Hollow =

Studio album by Balflare
- Released: 2008
- Genre: Power metal
- Length: 52 min 06 s
- Label: Soundholic

Balflare chronology
| Tempest (2006) | Sleeping Hollow (2008) |

Sleeping Hollow is Balflare's third album, released in 2008.

== Track listing ==
1. The Day Falls - (05:21)
2. Bird Cage - (04:12)
3. Celestial Winter - (04:47)
4. The Dunes - (04:40)
5. Rise on the Ashes - (05:47)
6. When the Hollow Sleeps - (00:46)
7. Waking in Silence - (04:23)
8. Tormentor - (03:51)
9. Sail to The Horizon - (04:44)
10. The Eye of Pharaoh - (09:04)
11. Pray for Rosalia - (04:26)
