= Fantastic Detective Labyrinth =

Japanese manga and anime series

- Cover of the first volume of Fantastic Detective Labyrinth as published by Kodansha

素敵探偵☆ラビリンス (Suteki Tantei Rabirinsu)
- Genre: Occult detective
- Manga
- Written by: Meito Banjō
- Illustrated by: Seiji Wakayama
- Published by: Kodansha
- Magazine: Magazine Special
- Original run: August 17, 2006 – August 12, 2008
- Volumes: 8
- Anime television series
- Directed by: Hiroshi Watanabe
- Studio: Studio Deen
- Original network: TV Tokyo
- Original run: October 2, 2007 – March 25, 2008
- Episodes: 25

Fantastic Detective Labyrinth (Japanese: 素敵探偵☆ラビリンス, Hepburn: Suteki Tantei Rabirinsu) is a manga series written by Meito Banjō and illustrated by Seiji Wakayama, published in Kodansha's Magazine Special.

The manga was adapted into an animated television series in 2007. The Studio Deen production aired on TV Tokyo from October 2, 2007, to March 25, 2008, totaling 25 episodes. It is based on the story from the first volumes of the manga.

== Plot ==
Thirty years prior to the events of the series, the city of Tokyo was destroyed in a massive earthquake. From the ruins of the former megalopolis, Kyuto was established. In this new city, supernatural occurrences are progressively increasing and the only one capable of unraveling them is Hyuuga Mayuki, a boy detective and esper.

== Characters ==
=== Main characters ===
Mayuki Hyūga (日向 繭樹, Hyūga Mayuki)
A twelve-year-old boy with what seems to be extraordinary problem-solving skills. The police are unable to pull anything out from his background, which seems to be purposely hidden. He has never attended school before and appears to be a genius in all subjects with the exception of physical education. It is later revealed that he has the power of Shinchi, a power given to the new head of the Hyuuga family. He's the head of the Hyuuga family. His appearance is very innocent and doll-like, with blond hair and blue eyes.
Voiced by: Miyuki Sawashiro
Seiran Shinano (信濃 晴嵐, Shinano Seiran)
Mayuki's butler. Seiran was once called a "doll user" by Byakko during one of their encounters. He also is found occasionally in a secret base of some sort, where he can keep a close eye on Kyuto's happenings, as well as Mayuki's whereabouts. He belongs to the family of Shinano, a family that supports the Hyuuga family. He made a promise to Mayuki's mother that he'll always protect Mayuki. He's Shien and Seiju's brother and Mayuki's uncle in reality.
Voiced by: Junichi Suwabe
Hatsumi Mieno/Sōka (三重野 初実, Mieno Hatsumi)
Mayuki's maid. Mayuki once said that Hatsumi is always in a hurry to find him in the house that she trips over her own feet, which she will subsequently let out an outrageous scream. It is later revealed that she is one of the two "dolls" that Seiran controls. When in her aya or doll form she fights using her hair as a whip.
Voiced by: Kana Ueda
Sanae Izumi/Yūhi (和泉 さなえ, Izumi Sanae)
Minori's busty older sister. Sanae is always looking to join in an adventure with Mayuki and his friends. It is later revealed that she is one of the two "dolls" that Seiran controls. When in her aya or doll form she uses a pair of claws to fight.
Voiced by: Ryōka Yuzuki
Minori Izumi (和泉 みのり, Izumi Minori)
Minori is one of the first friends Mayuki made when he first entered school. She appears to be infatuated with Mayuki and can sometimes be seen competing with Yaya over Mayuki's affection.
Voiced by: Nana Inoue
Yae Yatomi (弥富 ヤエ, Yatomi Yae)
Commonly known as "Yaya" or "Yayako." She appears to be suffering from asthma, but it was found out that she was actually suffering from Mineral Dust Allergy that is caused by pollution in the Industrial Center, where she lives. Yaya seems to be recovering after the trial. She appears to be infatuated with Mayuki and can sometimes be seen competing with Minori over Mayuki's affection.
Voiced by: Satomi Satō
Rakuta Koga (古賀 楽太, Koga Rakuta)
Rakuta is the older brother among the twins. He is very calm and calculating and always keeps his cool. He can predict events what will happen in the near future.
Voiced by: Marina Inoue
Kōta Koga (古賀 幸太, Koga Kōta)
Kota is the younger brother among the twins. Compared to Rakuta, he is more hot-headed and doesn't think much before he acts. He appears to be infatuated with Yaya, but often sees her going after Mayuki, which causes Kouta to envy him.
Voiced by: Romi Park
Miyako Tomaru (戸丸 都, Tomaru Miyako)
A female detective that was skeptical of Mayuki when they first met. Miyako has given Mayuki a certain degree of respect after clearing up some suspicion around him. She can be seen to be fairly concerned about him if given any information of Mayuki being in danger.
Voiced by: Sayaka Ohara
Inogami Ryūsuke (猪神 隆介, Ryūsuke Inogami)
He is a male detective whom Tomaru is always accompanied with in every phantom case together with Mayuki. He is also a close friend of Mayuki. He can be seen always serious and quite making fun when Tomaru is in serious mood.
Voiced by: Konishi Katsuyuki

=== Minor characters ===
Shara Hyūga
Mayuki's mother. They share the same hair and eye color. She left Mayuki under the care of Seiran. She lives in Switzerland.
Maru (マル)
Mayuki's dog. He's a large dog with white fur. He always goes with Mayuki and his friends.
Shien Shinano (信濃 紫炎, Shinano Shien)
He's Seiran's older brother. Seiran hated him at first but understood him at the end. He's childish and irritating. He's the new headmaster of the school Mayuki attends. He lives in Switzerland and protects Shara. He went to Japan to check on his brother Seiran and to make sure Mayuki is alright. He is also a doll user.
Yoko
She's Shien's "Aya" and Byakko's older sister. She also serves as the secretary of the headmaster of the school Mayuki attends. She usually carries a harisen with her and uses it on Shien if he irritates or annoys her.

=== Antagonists ===
Byakko (白蟲)
A mysterious woman who is looking for the power of immortality. She is later revealed to be Seiju's "Aya". When she was still young her older sister, Yoko, left her to become Shien's "Aya". This incident depressed her a lot so she decided to join Seiju, thus, becoming his doll.
Seiju / Masaki Hyūga (セイジュ / 日向 聖樹, Seiju / Hyūga Masaki)
He is Mayuki's father. He's the former head of the Hyuuga family before Mayuki. He's born in the Shinano family but because of his extrasensory perception, the Hyuga family adopted him to have an heir. After Mayuki was born, he became nothing. Because of that, he did bad things. He is jealous of Mayuki because he wanted Mayuki's power. He's Seiran and Shien's brother in reality. He is also a doll user.

== Media ==
=== Episodes ===
No.	Title	Original release date
1	"Kyuto's Great Detective"; Transliteration: "Kyuto na Meitantei" (Japanese: 旧都な名探偵)	October 3, 2007
There's a rumor about a white-faced ghost living within an old mansion in the woods, some students decide to investigate. Meanwhile, two city detectives decide to track down a mysterious informant who has been helping them solve some difficult cases via phone tips. At the end, they meet the mysterious young Mayuki and his house staff.
2	"Mayuki's Determination"; Transliteration: "Mayuki no Ketsui" (Japanese: 繭樹の決意)	October 10, 2007
Mayuki decides to attend school, seeing as it is his twelfth birthday. Halfway during the school day, a bomb threat starts the first of a serial bombing sequence. Mayuki decides to see if he can stop the third bomb from destroying the already damaged city.
3	"Leaning Tower Adventure"; Transliteration: "Shatou no Bouken" (Japanese: 斜塔の冒険)	October 17, 2007
Minori asks Mayuki to fix a special souvenir for her, a birthday present from her father a long time ago. Mayuki reluctantly explains that he can't and wishes that he could, but he can't. Kouta has spent most of the day fuming about how everyone at school--particularly the girls--are fawning over Mayuki. Rakuta suggests a plan to him and Kouta shows up, declaring that he will venture into a no-trespassing zone to find Minori a new souvenir. At the last minute, everyone but Yaya-chan decides to go to the abandoned Tokyo tower where things mysteriously turn weird.
4	"The Truth of Red and White"; Transliteration: "Aka to Shiro no Shinjitsu" (Japanese: 赤と白の真実)	October 23, 2007
After what appeared to be an earthquake, Mayuki, Maru and Kouta travel to the bottom of Tokyo Tower to reconnect the power source to the elevator to save Rakuta and Minori, who are trapped within it. Someone else seems to be orchestrating the strange happenings. A larger mystery appears to be present behind the odd events that occurred within the Tower.
5	"Kyuto's Elegy"; Transliteration: "Kyuuto Aika" (Japanese: 旧都哀歌)	October 30, 2007
Yaya has been absent for several days, and Mayuki and his friends decide to visit her in the industrial city district. Later on, they find out that the Industrial Center that Yaya resides in is actually extremely polluted, and her brother, Shichirou is a key witness of an upcoming trial against the town's mayor, who has been harassing the family by sending thugs.
6	"Railroad Strategy"; Transliteration: "Bouryaku no Tetsudou" (Japanese: 謀略の鉄路)	November 6, 2007
Mayuki and the gang race against the clock to solve the mystery of where Shichirou has disappeared to. Mayuki's mysterious gift is used to aid his deductions as the time for the trial grows near. Byakko is found to be tied to this event as well, inevitably causing Seiran to once again step in.
7	"Kyuto, Bomb, and Black Tea"; Transliteration: "Kyuuto to Bakudan to Koucha" (Japanese: 旧都と爆弾と紅茶)	November 13, 2007
Mayuki, Seiran, Hatsumi, and Sanae go to the Mutsunomori Building to watch a movie, but end up in a pinch with a possessed director who appears to be under the influence of Byakko. Mayuki begins to feel a slight uneasiness in these occurrences.
8	"Hatsumi's Agony"; Transliteration: "Hatsumi no Junan" (Japanese: 初実の受難)	November 20, 2007
Hatsumi is mistakenly caught up in a murder relating to an urban myth that has been passed down throughout the Wakakusanmoegi Girls High School. Mayuki rushes to help her and it is his influence via Seiran who is able to see that Hatsumi can return home while the investigation proceeds. Hatsumi is troubled as she tries to think what has happened and also remembers her past and how she came to stay with Mayuki.
9	"Unforgivable Crime"; Transliteration: "Yurusarezaru Tsumi" (Japanese: 許されざる罪)	November 28, 2007
Mayuki has learned the identity of the true culprit behind the last mystery in which Hatsumi was a near suspect. He tries to reason with the villain and almost succeeds until Byyako's interference. Luckily, Seiran steps in to keep things from running out of hand. Mayuki realizes that something deeper is going on.
10	"Atonement of the Scapegoat"; Transliteration: "Shokuzai no Ikunei" (Japanese: 贖罪の生贄)	December 5, 2007
A man's corpse is found skewered to the top of a radio tower and the cops try to find the culprit. Meanwhile Mayuki wonders if something was controlling the previous criminals and later decides to help with the case
11	"The Result of Desire"; Transliteration: "Yokubou no Hate" (Japanese: 欲望の果て)	December 12, 2007
The previous case was classified as a phantom case. Luckily, Mayuki's deductions helped to isolate a suspect, unfortunately the culprit is killed by the mysterious woman in white.
12	"Heart-Thumping Pool-Side"; Transliteration: "Pool Side de Doki" (Japanese: プールサイドでドキッ)	December 19, 2007
Mayuki is feeling a bit down and Minori excitedly shows everyone tickets to a poolside park. They all show up and Mayuki is afraid of the water because he can't swim. Sanae and Hatsumi show up and they begin to play games between teaching Mayuki how to swim, when a thief steals something from right under their noses!
13	"Spirited Away Game"; Transliteration: "Kamikakushi Yuugi (GEEMU)" (Japanese: 神隠し遊戯（ゲーム）)	December 25, 2007
Women are disappearing all over Kyuto and Inspector Miyako finally goes to Mayuki for help. He is able to help them narrow down the next woman to disappear--Sanae! After the next disappearance, Mayuki discovers messages left behind especially for him.
14	"Godly Wisdom Ignition"; Transliteration: "Shinchi Hakka" (Japanese: 神智発火)	January 8, 2008
Mayuki is able to figure out that someone is manipulating him and trying to get at something deeper. He can't put his finger on it, but he can tell where Sanae is being kept. Hatsumi, Seiran and Mayuki hurry to the crime scene only to finally encounter the mysterious man behind the recent events, a strangely dark figure calling himself Seiju.
15	"Thoughts and Oaths"; Transliteration: "Omoi to Chikai" (Japanese: 想いと誓い)	January 15, 2008
Mayuki wants to look into all the phantom cases. While investigating, he comes across a mansion, where he wants to go. On the way, Byakko attacks him.
16	"Purple Flame"; Transliteration: "Murasaki no Honoo" (Japanese: 紫の炎)	January 22, 2008
Seiran's brother arrives in japan and decides to lead the police around while messing around with Mayuki and his friends at school. It is finally revealed that Shien is also the headmaster of the school--and a doll user.
17	"The Other Aya"; Transliteration: "Mou Hitotsu no Aya" (Japanese: もう一つの彩)	January 29, 2008
Shien organizes a marathon for the school children in the cold weather. Mayuki, who is left behind by the rest of his friends in the marathon, tries seeking other ways to complete it.
18	"Hyuuga and Shinano"; Transliteration: "Hyuuga to Shinano" (Japanese: 日向と信濃)	February 5, 2008
Shien puts Mayuki and his friends to a game in the Hyuuga mansion. Seiran seeks the answer to why Shien has arrived. A bit of Seiran and Shien's past is shown.
19	"Fountain of Reminiscence"; Transliteration: "Tsuioku no Izumi" (Japanese: 追憶の泉)	February 12, 2008
Mayuki and friends go on a camping trip. While searching for food, Sanae and Hatsumi reminisce about their first meeting with Mayuki. Mayuki and the twins get lost in the woods and enter a cave. There, Mayuki gets attacked by Byakko. Seiran, Sanae and Hatsumi arrive in time to save him. Seiju arrives and reveals a shocking truth.
20	"Overture of Collapse"; Transliteration: "Houkai no Jokyoku" (Japanese: 崩壊の序曲)	February 19, 2008
Seiran is disturbed by the recent events. Mayuki detects this and goes to Shien to know the truth. Shien declines to tell anything and taunts Mayumi to find out by himself. Mayuki goes to the old town, where Byakko arrives. Mayuki questions Byakko about the truth, but gets attacked. Seiran arrives for help. Just when Byakko is about to kill Seiran, Mayuki's power awaken.
21	"Warped Color"; Transliteration: "Yuganda Shikisai" (Japanese: 歪んだ色彩)	February 26, 2008
Byakko is shaken by Seiran's words. Mayuki's friends meet up to see Mayuki. They meet a female who claims that she was a maid for the Hyuugas. She says that she's happy that Mayuki has found friends and talks about making happy memories and time capsules. The friends decide that they want Mayuki to be a part of the time capsule they already buried. While trying to bring back the time capsule, they are attacked and Mauki awakens sensing the danger to his friends. He arrives along with Shien and his Aya, Yoko. Byakko attacks Mayuki while Yoko protects him. The story behind Byakka and Yoko is told.
22	"Distant Bonds"; Transliteration: "Tooi Kizuna" (Japanese: 遠い絆)	March 4, 2008
Mayuki's friends are still escaping from Tokyo with Miyako and Inogami. Shien and Yoko face off with Seiju and Byakko and both Shein and Yoko get beaten. Seiran, Sanae and Hatsumi arrive to help. Mayuki senses Seiju's presence and arrives to the building where he is. Seiju taunts him saying he cannot save his friends, who are attacked by a Desert Worm, unless he awakens his powers. Seiju's purpose and identity are revealed.
23	"The Things We Can Do"; Transliteration: "Bokutachi ni Dekiru Koto" (Japanese: 僕たちにできること)	March 11, 2008
Mayuki starts feeling guilty about all the happenings and starts blaming himself, thinking that he should, alone, make everything right. The earthquakes caused by the Mayuki unable to control his increasing powers are still have tremors. While everyone is worried about Mayuki, in Tokyo, the buildings which had been buried by the previous quake are rising. Mayuki spots a mansion and recognizing it, decides to go there.
24	"Beyond Godly Wisdom"; Transliteration: "Shinchi no Kanata" (Japanese: 神智の彼方)	March 18, 2008
Mayuki is joined by his friends in the search of the 'forgotten thing'. The arrive at the mansion which turns out to be the place where Mayiki stayed as a baby. Seiran and Seiju fight, Seiran with the determination of ending everything. Mayuki finally finds the 'forgotten thing', only for it to be snatched away by Byakko.
25	"Time Expires and The Flower Petals Scatter"; Transliteration: "Toki wa Michi, Hana wa Chiru" (Japanese: 時は満ち，花は散る)	March 25, 2008
Mayuki meets his father, Seiju. After obtaining the music box, Seiju obtains the power of Shinichi. While the earthquakes are happening all over, he challenges Miyuki, to predict where the next fire pillar will erupt. Mayuki predicts all of them. The final prediction is whether the next fire pillar will erupt under Mayuki or Seiju. Seiju loses, and Mayuki is overwhelmed by using his power and goes to sleep for a month. Everyone is worried about when he will wake up. In the climax, Mayuki wakes up and even goes to school normally, and a new girl joins his class.

=== Music ===
Opening theme
"Monochrome" (モノクローム, Monokurōmu) by Kannivalism
Ending themes
"Dakishimete" (抱きしめて) by Shiita Ө (episodes 1–13)
"Lovers' tone" by me ho (episodes 14–25)
