= Nookicky =

Japanese band

- Origin: Japan
- Genres: Folk rock, electronic rock
- Years active: 2001–2005 (currently on hiatus)
- Labels: FINCHLIQUEUR (JP)
- Members: Furukawa Tomo, U
- Past members: Dinah, Zull
- Website: www.niwlun.net

Nookicky is a Japanese visual kei rock band formed in 2001 by Tomo Furukawa(Full) after the split of previous band, guniw tools. Zull and Dinah joined soon after that and they played various lives, including one in Hong Kong. Zull left the band in 2003 and joined The Candy Spooky Theater and Monaural Curve and was replaced by U (also in Kharn). Support member Fuumi also joined in 2003 and played with Nookicky for a few months.

After numerous releases and live shows in Japan, Hong Kong, Tibet, Nepal and the US, Dinah left the band in 2005 in order to concentrate on her solo project. She is now in the band Sound Dope. Currently Nookicky consists of Full on vocals and U on guitar. The band is now on hiatus, with U in the band Kharn and Full concentrating on his solo project Shilfee and Tulipcorobockles.

Even though Nookicky is based on the same influences, it is not an extension of Guniw Tools in any way. Dark songs were typical for Nookicky in the beginning, but because the band went through a lot of changes, the style became a little lighter. Inspiration for their music comes from countries like India and Nepal and is very noticeable in their music. Nookicky certainly has a refreshing electro sound based on FULL's wonderful imagination.

== Biography ==
Nookicky was formed in 2001 shortly after Guniw Tools broke up in December 2000. It started out as FULL's solo project, for which he provided the vocals, but soon enough he formed a team with his friend Dinah, whose official position in the band was "dancer", later on he took to playing bass and flute. The name Nookicky comes from the words ‘nook’ (as in corner) and ‘kicky’ which according to FULL means excited.

A few months later the band recruited their guitarist ZULL. It is interesting to know that FULL had only known him for a month before he asked him to join Nookicky. During this initial period they released a few mini-albums; Cloudy Pop Book, Rigid Ink Pool and in 2002, Koochachu.

However soon after releasing their first full album, One Aging by Nook in 2003, ZULL decided to leave the band. Luckily, a replacement U was found during the spring of 2003. During that time, they were also joined by a support-bassist, fu~mi.

Soon they released the album Pinhole which was followed by Rotepin in 2005. Both clearly had a different sound compared to their previous albums. The sound was lighter and varied more than their earlier music, now supported by a stronger bass and guitar. Influences from Tibet and India are clearly heard on these albums too.

Dinah left the band in the beginning of 2005 to focus on a solo career. Because fu~mi had only been a support-bassist, the band only existed as only a two-person unit of FULL and U after that.

In July 2005, the album Noon Moon was released, which was considered the most "dreamy" album Nookicky had released. Unfortunately this was also the last release Nookicky produced before FULL announced that the band would go on hiatus after their tour in December.

The band is still on hiatus while FULL is working on a new project that he founded called Shilfee and Tulipcorobockles, which leans towards the opera/rockabilly sound. U's been busy with Kahrn. Dinah went through a sex change and is now a woman and currently occupied with Sound Dope. ZULL left Nookicky firstly for Monaural Curve but also joined the band The Candy Spooky Theater.

Even though Nookicky took their chances to perform in foreign countries (Hong Kong, Tibet, Nepal, New York) it is questionable whether they will ever get back together again. Likewise with Guniw Tools, FULL seems to have a thing for putting projects on hiatus and never reviving them again. However, this all should not overshadow the fact that Nookicky presented us some wonderful music to enjoy.

== Lineup ==
- Furukawa Tomo (古川 とも)- vocals
- U- guitar

== Former members ==
- Zull- guitar (gone 2003)
- Dinah- keyboard (gone 2004)

== Discography ==
Albums

- ONE AGING BY NOOK 2003/05/10
- Pinhole 2003/10/01
- Water Sinker 2004/10
- NOON MOON 2005/07/10

EPs

- CLOUDY POP BOOK 2001/05/20
- RIGID INK POOL 2001/11/11
- Koochachu 2002/06/20
- Rotepin 2004/05/20

Videography

- VV CLOUDY POP BOOK 2001/12/20
- VV DIGEST E1 2002/01
- VV PINCHAPOOL 2004/04/25

Books

- Nookicky's Four Years Works 2004
- Nookicky Tibetan Photo Book 2004
