= Rice (band) =

Japanese visual kei rock band

- Origin: Japan
- Genres: Cello rock; progressive rock
- Years active: 2001–present
- Members: Yuki Sakurai; Hiro Murata

Rice (styled as rice) are a Japanese visual kei rock band formed by ex-Raphael members Yuki and Hiro. Like Raphael, a lot of rice's music is in the rock genre although instead of guitar the cello is a much more prominent instrument in their work.

The band, although not as visual as they used to be in Raphael, still keep a very distinct fashion from that of a lot of other bands.

== Band members ==
Yuki Sakurai: Lead vocalist, main lyricist, main composer and bass guitarist (occasionally). Kazuhiro "Hiro" Murata: Backing vocalist, percussionist, drummer

Although technically not members of the band, many session instrumentalists have contributed both to album recordings and live shows including Hiroshi Egami (guitar), Fumiaki Nishiyama (bass), Toshihiko Nagayama (cello) and Ayumi Hashimoto (cello).

Something that is common on a lot of Rice releases is the inclusion of the same song, "Air", on a number of releases. "Air" is a song with no lyrics; it consists of a vocal melody, a cello melody and a percussion accompaniment. It appears on every album and single they have released, re-recorded each time, with the exception of "はるか" (Haruka), "刑事ヒロンボ" (Keizi Hironbo) and "There is…".

In October 2012, Rice announced that they will be going on an indefinite hiatus. They will be performing their last show before their hiatus at the Akasaka Blitz on December 25. They resumed activities in late 2013, however, and released their comeback single, "僕はここに居る" (Boku wa Koko ni Iru), that December.

== Discography ==
=== Albums ===
- Love Rain (ラブレイン) 2002-07-24 Oricon Style Weekly Album Top Position: 89
- Rame (ラメ) 2004-11-01
- Trial 0406 2007-01-31
- 六極 Sympathy (六極シンパシー) 2009-10-21 Oricon Style Weekly Album Top Position: 110
- Niel (2010-10-06) Oricon Style Weekly Album Top Position: 100
- Shizuku (2014-11-01)

=== Singles ===
- "Angerudie" (アンゲルディエ) 2001-07-25
- "Kurogane" (鐡) 2001-10-31
- "Haruka" (はるか) 2002-10-23 Oricon Style Weekly Single Top Position: 68
- "F (Forte)" (f～フォルテ～) (f~forte~) 2005-03-08
- "Mei" (芽生) 2005-05-05
- "Keizi Hironbo" (刑事ヒロンボ) 2004-12-28
- "There is..." 2006 Oricon Style Weekly Single Top Position: 156
- "Brave Story" 2008-09-03 Oricon Style Weekly Single Top Position: 121
- "Heart is Always" 2008-03-26 Oricon Style Weekly Single Top Position: 106
- "Lovers" 2010-03-10 Oricon Style Weekly Single Top Position: 35
- "Sing You" 2010-04-14 Oricon Style Weekly Single Top Position: 28
- "Cicada" 2010-08-04 Oricon Style Weekly Single Top Position: 59
- "Rin" 2011-04-16
- "Ito" 2012-04-14
- "Akashia" 2012-06-06
- "Fake Star" 2012-10-24
- "Boku wa koko ni iru" 2013-12-25
- "Nobara" 2014-04-02
- "Kotoba ni dekinai" 2014-07-30
- "Asterisk/Never" 2015-07-15
- "Mirai" 2018-12-26

=== Promotional CD ===
- 兎に角（ウサギニツノ） (Usagi ni Tsuno) (2003-07-16)
- FCイベント“春の好き間”参加記念 (FC Event “Haru no Tsuki Aida” Sanka Kinen) (2004–07)
- 2005年カレンダーおまけ (2005 Toshi karenda-omake) (2004-12-28)
- 2006年カレンダーおまけ (2006 Toshi karenda-omake) (2005-12-28)
- 2007年カレンダーおまけ (2007 Toshi karenda-omake) (2006-12-27)

=== Video ===
- 辻 (Tsuji) (2004-12-28)

=== DVD ===
- ricelive [0/∞ Lv:9] rice vs 刑事ヒロンボ (Keizi Hironbo) ～respect it cool sounds evolution～ (2005-09-07)
