= Balflare =

Japanese power metal band

- Origin: Tokyo, Japan
- Genres: Power metal
- Years active: 2004–2016
- Labels: Soundholic, Black-Listed, Fastball
- Past members: Eijin Kawazoe; Isao Matsuzaki; Leo Yabumoto; Syuta Hashimoto; Takashi Odaira; Hideki Tada; Ayuko Hayano
- Website: Official Site

Balflare was a Japanese power metal band from Tokyo, formed in 2004. The band released four studio albums between 2005 and 2012. The band has been inactive since 2016.

== Biography ==
Balflare was formed in 2004 by guitarist Syuta Hashimoto and vocalist Hideki Tada. Together, they began recording a demo, Sound of Silence. During the recording of this demo, drummer Isao Matsuzaki and bassist Takashi Odaira joined the band.

In 2005 they released their first full-length album Thousands of Winters of Flames through Hidden Maniacs. Following the release, guitarist Leo Yabumoto was recruited in order to reproduce the twin guitar leads live. After a couple of gigs in Japan, vocalist Hideki Tada left the band. Eijin Kawazoe was recruited as the new vocalist.

The band started recording their second full length in August, 2005. During this time, they recorded the song "Out Break" for the SAMURAI METAL Vol. 1 compilation album. In 2006, they released the album Tempest on July 26 through Soundholic. Their third album, Sleeping Hollow, was released on April 23, 2008. On September 28, 2012, they released their fourth album, Downpour. In 2016, Downpour was re-released in the European market by German label Fastball Music. After the release of Downpour, the band lapsed into inactivity.

== Members ==
=== Final line-up ===
- Syuta Hashimoto – guitar, keyboards (2004–2016)
- Isao Matsuzaki – drums (2004–2016)
- Takashi Odaira – bass (2004–2016)
- Leo Yabumoto – guitar (2005–2016)
- Eijin Kawazoe – vocals (2005–2016)

=== Former members ===
- Hideki Tada – vocals (2004–2005)
- Ayuko Hayano – keyboards (2005–2007)

== Discography ==
=== Demos ===
- Sound of Silence (January 2004) - Self-released.

=== Albums ===
- Thousands of Winters of Flames (March 23, 2005) - Hidden Maniacs
- Tempest (July 26, 2006) - Soundholic
- Sleeping Hollow (April 23, 2008) - Soundholic
- Downpour (September 28, 2012) - Black-Listed Records

=== Compilation Contributions ===
- "Out Break", SAMURAI METAL Vol. 1
