= Sarina Suno =

Japanese violinist

Sarina Suno, AKA the "Violin Diva", is a Japanese violinist. She plays Jazz, Pop, Rock, and most notoriously House music.

Suno began playing the violin aged 5, and first studied classical violin in Japan and then in Boston at the Berklee College of Music. She discovered the electric violin, which is now her preferred instrument. Soon afterwards, she signed a recording contract with Victor Entertainment, under Sony Japan. She released two CDs Violin Diva Volume 1 and Violin Diva volume 2 in Japan, as well as a half dozen other EPs and singles. She also recorded several Jazz albums including Introducing Sarina Suno, featuring Mike Stern and Dave Weckl. A recording of house music, Dancing Violin, was released on the French label Lift’in Records in August, 2011, and another was released on New York label Strictly Rhythm Records in October 2012.
