= Aliene Ma'riage =

Japanese rock band

- Origin: Hyōgo, Japan
- Genres: Hard rock, gothic metal, alternative metal, industrial metal
- Years active: 1998–2001, 2005, 2007
- Labels: Key Party
- Past members: Kyoka; Mast; Ray

Aliene Ma'riage was a Japanese visual kei rock band, formed by Kyoka, Mast and Ray in 1998 and disbanded in 2001. The group released three albums, along with several singles and videos. The band's sound was described as "a fusion of gothic elements and hard edge sound."

== History ==
By December 1999 the 8 song release Les Soirée Yoru no Butoukai/Senrei no Shou ~ Shoutan Hen sold out an edition of 10,000. Aliene Ma'riage completed a country wide tour in 2000, before recording their first maxi single "Ma'ria" which was released on August 26.

On March 30, 2001 they released their first full album 21st Century. The same year, Kyoka announced his first solo mini-album M.

Aliene Ma'riage had a reunion shows in 2005 and 2007 at the "Hold Your Key Party" revivals.

== Members ==
- Kyoka – vocals
- Mast – guitar
- Ray – bass

== Discography ==
Albums

- Les Soirée Yoru no Butoukai/Senrei no Shou ~ Shoutan Hen (May 26, 1999) Oricon Weekly Album Chart Ranking: 68
- Les Soirée Yoru no Butoukai/Danzai no Shou ~ Shinbatsu Hen (July 23, 1999)
- 21st Century (March 31, 2001)

Singles

- "Ma'ria" (August 26, 2000)
- "La Matinee" (August 1, 2001)

Videos

- Les Soirée ~Butoukai no E~ (April 28, 2000)
- Last Live (August 1, 2001)
- Boku ~Shimobe~ (August 1, 2001)
