= Baroque (band) =

Japanese rock band

BAROQUE
- Origin: Japan
- Genres: alternative rock, rap rock, post-rock, electronic rock
- Years active: 2001–2004, 2011, 2012–2020 (indefinite hiatus)
- Labels: S'Cube; Firewall Div.; SMEJ; Warner Music Japan
- Members: ryo Kei
- Past members: Naru; Yuji; Bansaku; Akira
- Website: Official site

BAROQUE (previously stylized as Baroque and baroque) was a Japanese rock band originally formed in 2001. Originally signed to S'Cube, a sub-division of the independent record label Free-Will, the band later switched to the company's Firewall Division, with distribution handled by Sony Music Entertainment Japan. After releasing two albums, along with a greatest hits compilation, several singles and home video releases, baroque disbanded in 2004.

They became the newest band to play at the prestigious Nippon Budokan after just two years and three months into their career. They have also been credited as one of the bands that started oshare kei, a subgenre of visual kei that features more colorful outfits and utilizes upbeat and "happy" music.

baroque reunited for a free concert in 2011 and fully restarted activities in January 2012. That same month, baroque became the first independent band to have three of the top five positions on Oricon's main chart. However, bassist Bansaku left the group several months later and guitarist Akira followed in 2013, leaving only the duo of vocalist ryo and guitarist Kei.

== History ==
=== 2001–2004: Formation and disbandment ===
baroque was formed in May 2001 by guitarist Akira and bassist Bansaku, after vocalist ryo and guitarist Kei joined in June, they had their first concert in August. The following month saw the demo "Hitei Derikashi" released and around the same time drummer Naru joined. The band released the mini-album Tokyo Stripper at their first one-man concert on January 12, 2002. However, Naru left the band in March and was replaced by Yuji.

Even thou they were still an independent band, baroque was able to play at NHK Hall and Akasaka Blitz. They signed to a major label in Spring 2003, however, Yuji officially left the band in May 2003 due to problems with his brain/memory. Their first major single was July 2003's "Gakidou". When baroque went major, their sound shifted and included a drum machine; also their style shifted to casual clothing. Their second major single "Ila" (2004) particularly had a trance/electronica sound. After an August 20, 2003 concert at the Nippon Budokan, which made baroque the fastest band to play the prestigious venue after just two years and three months of activity, Kei was arrested due to a drunken fight with the venue crew. Their single was delayed, several concerts cancelled, and their website temporarily closed.

After resuming activities and releasing several singles in 2004, Akira was temporarily hospitalized, resulting in more concert cancellations. In August, Bansaku announced he was resigning. On September 11, two days after the release of their first album Sug Life, baroque announced that they would break up, but they continued activities through the rest of the year. Their last concert was a sold-out performance at Zepp Tokyo on December 25, 2004, titled "baroque Last Live Mumirai -No Future-".

Vocalist ryo and guitarist Kei then reformed their previous band Kannivalism in 2006, while Bansaku and Akira formed boogieman in 2007.

=== 2011–2013: Reunion and the disappearance of Bansaku ===
baroque consisting of ryo, Kei, Bansaku and Akira reunited for a free live, titled "Odai ha Kekkou Irimasenkara", on July 17, 2011, at Yokohama Red Brick. An estimated 10,000 fans attended. On September 28, 2011, they announced that they would fully restart activities at a live called "baroque Re: First Live in Future" on January 6, 2012, at Zepp Tokyo. On January 4, they released three singles, "Rinzen Identity", "Mono Dorama" and "Teeny-Tiny Star". The singles reached third, fourth, and fifth, respectively, on the Oricon chart, making baroque the first independent band to have three of the top five positions on the majors' chart. They then went on a nationwide tour in March, followed by a hall tour in April.

On June 26, baroque posted on their website that bassist Bansaku had been missing since June 24. The band notified the police and even retitled their tour to "Search for Bansaku". A month later, on July 30, a message was posted on their website stating that a representative of Bansaku's contacted the band saying he was safe, but due to his health has decided to leave baroque. As the message was not from Bansaku himself, the other members stated that they were trying to arrange a meeting with him in person. However, at a later date, they officially accepted Bansaku's exit from the band. The members announced that it was due to "his private issue".

Following Bansaku's exit, in the end of 2012, Akira stepped away from the band's activities during the production of the album Non Fiction and officially left the band at a later date. Since then, baroque became a duo consisting of Ryo and Kei supported by touring/recording members. Kei stated that “we won't add any permanent member from here on”.

=== 2014–present ===
In February 2014, the band capitalized its name as BAROQUE.

On May 27, 2015, they released PLANETARY SECRET, the first album as a duo.

On October 26, 2016, a single "Girl" was released inviting ken from L'Arc-en-Ciel as the first external producer for the band. It was followed by two singles "AN ETERNITY" and "FLOWER OF ROMANCE" released on July 24, 2018.

On releasing the album PLANETARY SECRET, the band organized a preview event at a planetarium featuring planets as the motif of the album. Since then, the band aggressively takes conceptual approaches to their live events such as the concert allowing audiences to take photos with their smartphone and share them on SNS, the concert featuring live paintings, a 360° concert installing a round stage in the center of audiences, and the concert featuring a performance of a flower artist.

On April 30, 2019, "VISION OF // PEP" was held at Nihombashi Mitsui Hall, the first concert at a hall since they became a duo. At this concert, the songs of the upcoming album PUER ET PUELLA were unveiled prior to its release.

On July 13, 2019, the talk and preview event for the album was held. The band undertook the tour "THE BIRTH OF LIBERTY" with a total of 21 venues across Japan starting from July 24 at Nagoya E.L.L. Their 4th album PUER ET PUELLA (Latin words for "boys and girls") was released on July 30, 2019, that includes the three preceding singles. It was a long-awaited album after an interval of four years and two months since the release of the previous album PLANETARY SECRET.

On November 1, 2019, while the band intensively carried on their live concerts, they suddenly started mysterious countdown on Twitter. On the stroke of the midnight on November 2, they announced that the new album SIN DIVISION would be released in January next year. The fans and people around them were very surprised at the news because it was announced in the middle of the tour for the previous album that had been released only four months before then.

On January 10, 2020, "THE BIRTH OF LIBERTY" tour's final concert was held at Harmony Hall Zama, which was a triumphant return concert for Kei.

On January 28, 2020, the album SIN DIVISION was released. With the completion of this album, they accomplished “the three albums we decided to produce when we became a duo”, according to Kei. These three albums are often referred to as a black book for PLANETARY SECRET (PS), a white book for PUER ET PUELLA (PEP), and a red book for SIN DIVISION (SD). The concert tour for SIN DIVISION was scheduled starting from February 2020. However, the band had to postpone the tour because of the self-restraint request by the government under the COVID-19 pandemic.

On April 3, 2020, the band uploaded a music video with a demo recording of the new song "STAY" on YouTube. The entire movie was produced by Ryo and Kei using online communication tools while completely staying at home under the COVID-19 pandemic. The lyrics are entirely in English composed by Ryo and Kei. While the band were recording the full version of the music, they invited their fans to post photos or comments on "what they think precious, what they want to protect, or what they love" on Twitter and LINE OPENCHAT. These photos and comments were compiled into the movie and released with the full version of the music.

== Members ==
- ryo (怜) – vocals (2001–2004, 2011, 2012–present)
- Kei (圭) – guitar (2001–2004, 2011, 2012–present)

Former members

- Naru (ナル) – drums (2001–2002)
- Yuji (祐二) – drums (2002–2003)
- Bansaku (万作) – bass (2001–2004, 2011, 2012)
- Akira (晃) – guitar (2001–2004, 2011, 2012–2013)

== Discography ==
Albums

- Sug Life (September 9, 2004) Oricon Weekly Album Chart Top Position: No. 31
- Non-fiction (ノンフィクション; April 3, 2013) No. 7
- Planetary Secret (May 27, 2015) No. 73
- PUER ET PUELLA (July 30, 2019)
- SIN DIVISION (January 28, 2020)

Mini albums & EPs

- Tokyo Stripper (東京ストリッパー; January 12, 2002)
- Embrace (March 12, 2021)

Compilation Albums

- Brq 2001-2004 (December 12, 2004) No. 55
- Complete Collection 2001-2004 (April 3, 2013) No. 57

Singles

- "Sukebe Boy" (スケベボウイ; August 7, 2002)
- "Caramel Drops" (キャラメルドロップス; November 29, 2002)
- "Chaplin" (February 5, 2003) Oricon Weekly Single Chart Top Position: No. 23
- "Gakidou" (我伐道; July 24, 2003) No. 14
- "ila." (April 7, 2004) No. 17
- "Gariron" (ガリロン; April 21, 2004) No. 18
- "Nutty a Hermit" (July 28, 2004) No. 28
- "Rinzen Identity" (凛然アイデンティティ; January 4, 2012) No. 3
- "Monodrama" (モノドラマ; January 4, 2012) No. 4
- "Teeny-Tiny Star" (January 4, 2012) No. 5
- "Zaza Ori Ame" (ザザ降り雨; June 20, 2012) No. 7
- "Mellow Hollow" (メロウホロウ; July 18, 2012) No. 9
- "Kizuna" (キズナ; December 12, 2012) 10
- "Tatoeba Kimi to Boku" (たとえば君と僕; January 23, 2013) 10
- "GIRL" (October 26, 2016)
- "An Eternity" (July 24, 2018)
- "Flower of Romance" (July 24, 2018)
- "You" (December 25, 2018)
- "Stay" (April 25, 2020)

Videos

- Anakuro Film (あなくろフィルム; August 12, 2001)
- Kamen Final (絶交KAMEN Final; April 3, 2003)
- Brq DVD (December 15, 2004) Oricon Weekly DVD Chart Top Position: No. 55
- Clip Collection (March 23, 2005) No. 130
- Last Live Mumirai No Future (Last Live 無未来 NO FUTURE; March 23, 2005) No. 112
- Re:First Live In Future 2012.1.6 Live at Tokyo Dome City Hall (April 25, 2012) No. 87
- Tour Baroque Phenomenon 0th Phenomenon 2013.03.03 (ＴＯＵＲ バロック現象 第０現象 ２０１３．０３．０３; May 15, 2013) No. 53
- Tour Baroque Phenomenon 4th Phenomenon (ＴＯＵＲ バロック現象 第４現象; May 15, 2013) No. 58
- BAROQUE SPECIAL FILMING LIVE FOR BLU-RAY DISC OPEN YOUR WORLD AND SEE THE LIGHT [Moon] (August 12, 2015)
- ALL OF THE LOVE, ALL OF THE DREAM -LIVE at DIFFER ARIAKE 2017.12.25- (June 26, 2018)
- LIVE Blu-ray & DVD VISIONS OF // PEP LIVE at NIHONBASHI MITSUI HALL 2019.04.30- (December 25, 2019)
