= Raphael (band) =

Japanese visual kei rock band

- Raphael in 1999. Clockwise from top-left: Kazuki, Yuki, Yukito, Hiro

Background information
- Also known as: Raphael -Starring Kazuki-
- Origin: Japan
- Genres: Progressive rock; art rock; folk rock; baroque pop
- Years active: 1997–2001; 2012; 2016
- Labels: Sony; For Life Music; Universal; Avex Music Creative
- Spinoffs: Rice
- Past members: Yuki; Yukito; Hiro; Kazuki
- Website: raphael.jp

Raphael was a Japanese visual kei rock band formed in March 1997, when the members were only 15. They quickly achieved popularity, headlining the Nippon Budokan and reaching the top 20 on the Oricon charts, but disbanded in January 2001, after guitarist Kazuki died at age 19. The remaining three members reunited Raphael for two concerts in 2012 and for a 2016 tour.

== Career ==
Guitarist Kazuki and bassist Yukito originally began working together in a cover band in 1995. After the two began writing their own material, they were joined by vocalist Yuki and drummer Hiro and formed Raphael in March 1997. The band had their first concert on December 10, 1997, where they were the headlining act in front of 150 people due to each member inviting their classmates. After only four more concerts, they held their first one-man live in front of an audience of 300 at Ebisu Guilty on April 7, 1998. Their first album Lilac was released that same day and was followed with a home video. They charted on the Oricon chart for the first time when their song "Yume Yori Suteki na" was used for the TBS show Kyaiin Kanbyō no Megami no Hāto (キャイーン・寛平の女神のハート). They released two singles on the same day, one hitting number 37, and one number 38.

In 1999 their major label debut, "Hanasaku Inochi Aru Kagiri", reached number 25 on the Oricon. Their later releases centered about graduation because it was around the time the members would have graduated from high school, had they not dropped out to pursue music. They performed their first show at the Nippon Budokan in March 2000. However, on October 31, 2000, guitarist Kazuki died of a sedative overdose. In January 2001, after finishing a nationwide tour, Raphael decided to disband. Yuki and Hiro went on to form Rice, while Yukito formed Black Love.

Raphael's song "Yume Yori Suteki na" was covered by Dog in the Parallel World Orchestra on the compilation Crush! -90's V-Rock Best Hit Cover Songs-. The album was released on January 26, 2011 and features current visual kei bands covering songs from bands that were important to the '90s visual kei movement.

On April 7, 2012, it was announced that the remaining members, Yuki, Yukito and Hiro, would reunite Raphael for two nights at Zepp Tokyo on October 31 and November 1. Yuki claimed he made the decision back in 2010, while visiting Kazuki's grave. The shows featured Anchang (Sex Machineguns), Lida (Dacco, Psycho le Cému), Sakito (Nightmare) and Yumehito (Ayabie) as guest guitarists. They released a single under the name "Raphael -Starring Kazuki-" on the day of the first show; a re-recording of their hit 1999 single "Eternal Wish (Todokanu Kimi e)" that also includes the previously unreleased songs "Dear", "Haikei Nervous" and "Elf no Yuutsu". A two-disc live album of the two concerts titled Tenshi no Hinoki Butai was released on December 26 and includes 30 songs. Footage from both reunion concerts was also released on DVD that same day, titled Tenshi no Hinoki Butai Dai Ichi Ya "Hakuchumu", while the second show was released on January 30, 2013 as Tenshi no Hinoki Butai Dai Ni Ya "Kokuchumu".

In November 2015, it was announced that Raphael would reunite in 2016 for their first nationwide tour in 15 years, Iyashikoya. They performed a memorial concert for Kazuki at Tsutaya O-East on April 7, 2016, where it was announced that the end of the tour would mark the end of the band as Yukito was retiring from the music industry. The tour was held from May 23 to July 24. May 18 saw the release of the album Never -1997040719990429-, which is composed of re-recordings of songs from their indie period. Albums covering their major label recordings, Ending -1999072319991201- and Love Story -2000020220161101-, followed on August 3 and October 26 respectively. Raphael performed at Toyosu Pit on August 6 and 7, before performing their final two concerts at Zepp Tokyo on October 31 and November 1, 2016.

== Members ==
- Yuki Sakurai (櫻井有紀) – vocals (1997–2001, 2012, 2016)
- Yukito Honda (本田之人) – bass guitar, contrabass, backing vocals (1997–2001, 2012, 2016)
- Kazuhiro "Hiro" Murato (村田一弘) – drums (1997–2001, 2012, 2016)
- Kazuki Watanabe (渡辺和樹) – guitars, backing vocals, main songwriter, bandleader (1997–2000)

== Discography ==
Albums and mini-albums

- Lilac (April 7, 1998)
- Mind Soap (December 1, 1999) Oricon Album Chart Weekly Top Position: 30
- Sotsugyō (卒業; March 23, 2000) 50
- Fumetsu Hana (不滅華; February 21, 2001) 17
- Raphael Singles (August 1, 2001, compilation album) 25
- Tenshi no Hinoki Butai (December 26, 2012, live album) 133
- Never -1997040719990429- (May 18, 2016, self-cover album) 57
- Ending -1999072319991201- (August 3, 2016, self-cover album) 42
- Love Story -2000020220161101- (October 26, 2016, self-cover album) 36

Singles

- "White Love Story" (November 1, 1998)
- "Sick (XXX Kanja no Karute)" (Sick～xxx 患者のカルテ～; February 20, 1999)
- "Sweet Romance" (April 29, 1999) Oricon Single Chart Weekly Top Position: 38
- "Yume Yori Suteki na" (夢より素敵な; April 29, 1999) 37
- "Hanasaku Inochi Aru Kagiri" (花咲く命ある限り; July 23, 1999) 25
- "Eternal Wish (Todokanu Kimi e)" (eternal wish～届かぬ君へ～; October 1, 1999) 28
- "Promise" (November 20, 1999) 32
- "Lost Graduation" (February 2, 2000) 40
- "Evergreen" (August 23, 2000) 28
- "Akikaze no Rhapsody" (秋風の狂詩曲; November 1, 2000) 24
- "Eternal Wish (Todokanu Kimi e)" (October 31, 2012, re-recording) 24

Demo tape

- "Eternal Wish (Todokanu no Kimi e)" (December 24, 1997)

=== Home videos ===
VHS

- Lilac: Vision of Extremes (August 1, 1998, PVs)
- Lilac: Vision of Extremes II (September 20, 1999, PVs)
- Pictorial Poem (March 24, 2000, PVs)
- Raphael Special Live "Graduation" -2000.3.4 Nippon Budokan- (August 23, 2000, concert)
- Forever and Ever (April 25, 2001, making of)
- Pictorial Poem 2 (September 19, 2001, PVs)
- Last (September 19, 2001, concert)
- First (September 19, 2001, concert)

DVD

- Forever and Ever (April 25, 2001, making of)
- Raphael Clips (September 19, 2001, PVs)
- Last (September 21, 2001, concert)
- First (September 21, 2001, concert)
- Tenshi no Hinoki Butai Dai Ichi Ya "Hakuchumu" (December 26, 2012, concert) Oricon DVD Chart Weekly Top Position: 45
- Tenshi no Hinoki Butai Dai Ni Ya "Kokuchumu" (January 30, 2013, concert) 26
