= Guniw Tools =

Japanese visual kei rock band

- Origin: Hokkaidō, Japan
- Genres: Experimental rock; alternative rock; industrial rock; art rock
- Years active: 1989–2000, 2014-2018
- Label: Victor Entertainment
- Past members: Full; Jake; Asaki
- Website: Full/Guniw Tools Official Site

Guniw Tools (グニュウ・ツール, Gunyuu Tuuru) are a Japanese visual kei rock band. The band's theme is "Integrated Art Direction featuring visual images that come forth from sound." The band's name "Guniw Tools" was created from the Japanese phrase for "flimsy tool".

== History ==
In 1989, Tomo Furukawa created an audio-visual performance project called Guniw which incorporated artwork and music. The project did not evolve into a band until 1992 when Masatomo Kawase joined the project under the alias JAKE as guitarist and main composer, and the band changed its name to Guniw Tools. The band's third member, Asaki Yamahana, was initially only involved as a live support member but eventually became a full-fledged band member after gaining popularity with the fans. Having amassed a significant following by 1996, Guniw Tools was signed to Victor Entertainment, a major record company, and quickly released their first album Niwlun on Victor's Invitation label.

A home video was released to accompany Niwlun, featuring music videos for each song on the album primarily directed by Furukawa and shot and produced by the band themselves. These "DIY" videos would become a signature of the band, and almost all releases by the band (albums and singles alike) had a corresponding VHS release with videos for each song.

1997 saw the release of their second album Other Goose, followed by the mini-album Sparky. Though these albums proved to be successful (and would in fact be the highest-charting albums of the band's career), JAKE was not satisfied with the direction the band and chose to leave the project, leaving the band without their main composer.

With JAKE gone, the band continued as a duo and Asaki took over the duties as the band's main composer which led to a noticeable shift in style. This new style emerged on the band's first single following JAKE's departure, DADA. While the sound of the JAKE years had been influenced by folk rock, jazz, and shoegaze, this new single displayed hard electronic and industrial influences. This electro-industrial style was further expanded upon on the band's 1998 LP, Dazzle, and their 1999 LP, Fickle Boon.

In recent years, these two albums have come under scrutiny after reaching a Western audience thanks to the internet. It has been found that multiple songs seem to take elements from songs by the likes of Curve, The Stone Roses, Duran Duran, PJ Harvey, and Yo La Tengo, though the liner notes list only Asaki as songwriter. These allegations have never been addressed by the band.

In 2000 the band released the single CULLUCOO VISION before announcing a hiatus while the two band members explored new musical venues. Asaki went on to form the group Age of Punk and later joined with the group Bug. Full formed the group Nookicky and, after that group also went on hiatus, began releasing material under the name Shilfee and Tulipcorobockles.

The band has never officially come off hiatus, though there has been some activity since 2000. In 2003, Victor began a Guniw Tools re-release campaign, starting by remastering and re-releasing all previously released Guniw Tools album with material from the singles tacked on as bonus tracks. That same year, the Guniw Value Set was released, featuring all previously released video and concert footage on DVD, along with previously unreleased live footage from 1992－1994.

In 2011, Shilfee and Tulipcorobockles and Age of Punk headlined a show together called "Solo Solo GUNIW Tell Miracle". As an encore Full and Asaki came out on stage together to perform a handful of Guniw Tools songs. Later that same year Shilfe and Tulipcorobockles co-headlined a show with Cloudchair (JAKE's current project) called "Solo Solo GUNIW 2", afterwards Full and JAKE came out to play another set of Guniw Tools songs as an encore. Shilfee and Tulipcorobockles and Cloudchair have since gone on two more co-headlining tours. In 2014, after fourteen years apart, Guniw Tools officially reunited. In June 2015, the group released "Flare Up Stare", which was the first original Guniw Tools release in fifteen years.

== Members ==
- Full (Tomo Furukawa): Vocals & lyrics
- Asaki Yamahana: guitar, backing vocals, & programming
- JAKE (Masatomo Kawase): guitar, bass, backing vocals, programming, piano, & lyrics

== Support Members ==
- Dinah: Dancer
- Hiropon: Dancer
- Miyo Ken: Bass
- Katsushige Okazaki: Drums
- Jyuichi Watanabe: Guitar
- Wataru Daiko: Drums
- Ryuji Hase: Bass

== Discography ==
=== Albums ===
- Niwlun Apr 24 1996 (Oricon Style Weekly Rank 78)
- Other Goose Jan 22 1997 (Oricon Style Weekly Rank 40)
- Sparky Aug 21 1997 (Oricon Style Weekly Rank 45)
- Live Sparky Mar 21 1998
- Dazzle Aug 21 1998 (Oricon Style Weekly Rank 63)
- Fickle Boon Oct 21 1999 (Oricon Style Weekly Rank 79)
- GUNIW 2000Ls BEST Nov 22 2000

=== Singles ===
- "Fancy Pink" Oct 23 1996 (Oricon Style Weekly Rank 60)
- "Yomogi no kokoro" 「ヨモギの心」 Jan 22 1997 (Oricon Style Weekly Rank 49)
- "Dada" Dec 17 1997 (Oricon Style Weekly Rank 44)
- "Hush and Cool" Aug 21 1998 (Oricon Style Weekly Rank 92)
- "Shinchuuran" 「真鍮卵」 Apr 21 1999 (Oricon Style Weekly Rank 67)
- "Green Carnival" July 23, 1999
- "Cullucoo Vision" May 24, 2000 (Oricon Style Weekly Rank 73)

=== Videos ===
- 1992－1994
- VV NIWLUN
- VV FANCY PINK
- VV OTHER GOOSE
- VV SPARKY
- VV DADA
- VV LIVE SPARKY
- VV HUSH and COOL
- VV DAZZLE
- VV SINGLES

=== DVDs ===
- VV SINGLES
- GUNIW VALUE SET
