= Himitsu Kessha Kodomo A =

Japanese band

Himitsu Kessha Kodomo A (秘密結社コドモA) was a visual kei rock band founded in 2004 by vocalist Eiji (エイジ) and drummer Dai (ダイ) (both previously in Macaroni (マカロニ)).

== History ==
The band's lineup also included Nii (ニイ) and Takken (タッケン) on guitars, and Kouta (コウタ) on bass. They were signed to the visual kei indie label UNDER CODE PRODUCTIONS. The band released five maxi-singles, four live-only distributed singles, five mini-albums, a best-of album, and was featured on five omnibus albums

秘密結社コドモA disbanded on December 18, 2006, after Kouta announced he was leaving amid personal and legal issues involving Dai. They reformed as キボウ屋本舗 (Kibouya Honpo) and resumed in April 2007. However, on February 11, 2008, キボウ屋本舗 ceased activities again.

The band revived as 秘密結社コドモA for one night on March 24, 2008.
