= Gollbetty =

Japanese band

- Origin: Japan
- Genres: Ska, Pop rock, Rock
- Years active: 2004–2010
- Labels: Toy's Factory, Run Run Run Records, 56 Records
- Members: g-yun MISSY; CLASSY; Mush; TAKA-P; SHODAI; HIROAKI
- Past members: AKI 3

Gollbetty (ゴルベティー) are a seven-piece Japanese ska band with strong pop and punk influences.

== History ==
They formed in 2004 in Nagoya. In 2005, they released their debut EP, "Soul Fresh!". The vocalist of the band g-yun was soon recognized by fashion magazines. With the help of her appearances in the magazines, interest in the band soon picked up. It only took three months for the group to get a record deal with the indie label, Run Run Run Records. In 2006, the group re-released their debut EP, "Soul Fresh!" under their new record label. 2006 also saw the release of the debut single "Shou Koi Yubi Koiyubi", which was in the Oricon charts for 3 weeks. Two months after the single's release, Gollbetty's first full-length album "Golling!!" was released. The album only had the one single. The album was in the Oricon charts for four weeks at number 66. The band toured soon after the release to support the album. In late 2006, Gollbetty released their second single "Easy Going". The single stayed in the charts for two weeks. In 2007, the band released their third single "Snow Fall" which came with a DVD. The single charted in the top 30. Gollbetty broke up in May 2010, after the completion of their Final Tour, issuing the retrospective CD, "Gollbetty Best."

== Members ==
=== Current members ===
- g-yun - vocals
- MISSY - guitar
- CLASSY - bass
- Mush - drums
- TAKA-P - saxophone
- SHODAI - trumpet
- HIROAKI - trombone

=== Former members ===
- AKI 3 - drums

== Discography ==
=== Albums ===
- 2006: Golling!!
- 2007: Goll & Response!!
- 2008: Betty's Buggy
- 2009: Scramble

=== EPs ===
- 2005: Soul Fresh!

=== DVDs ===
- 2007: Rollon!
- 2009: Betty's Buggy Tour

=== Singles ===
- 2006: Shou Koi Yubi ~Koiyubi~
- 2006: Easy Going
- 2007: Snow Fall
- 2008: Cool Music
- 2008: Sakurail
- 2008: Crystal/ 99%
- 2009: Secret Word
- 2009: If

=== Compilations ===
- 2006: Hime Ska - Princess Ska
- 2006: Gelugugu Amigos
- 2006: King Of 69 Tribe - The Final
- 2007: Shonen Kamikaze - Master'd
- 2010: Gollbetty Best
