= Shilfee and Tulipcorobockles =

- Origin: Japan
- Genres: Electronica, new wave, lounge, dark wave
- Years active: 2005–present
- Labels: FINCHLIQUEUR (JP)
- Website: www.finchliqueur.net

Shilfee and Tulipcorobockles is the solo project of Tomo Furukawa, otherwise known as Full (ex-Guniw Tools & Nookicky). Full's newest project combines rock, pop, new wave, electronica, opera, and more with his hauntingly unique vocals.

In December 2004, Shilfee and Tulipcorobockles' first album "Chichiro" was released. It included the PV for the song "Dead Leaves" and was followed by a few live dates around Japan and Tibet (Full frequently visits Tibet whether he’s playing a live there or not and often writes about his travels in his blog).

In January 2007, Shilfee and Tulipcorobockles released another album entitled "Newolf". The album saw more of Full's unusual and cryptic lyrics, many of them in English.

== Lineup ==
Furukawa Tomo (古川 とも)

== Discography ==
=== Albums ===
- 10/12/2005 – Chihiro
- 23/12/2006 – Newolf
- 20/05/2008 – Knotty
- 30/09/2010 – Hermit Paean
