= Umineco Sounds =

Japanese band

Umineco Sounds ウミネコサウンズ
- Origin: Aomori Prefecture, Japan
- Genres: Rock, indie rock
- Years active: 2004-present
- Labels: Cinra Records
- Members: Osamu Furusato

Umineco Sounds (ウミネコサウンズ, Umineko Saunzu; literally "Seagull Sounds"; currently stylized as uminecosounds) is a Japanese indie rock band headed by Osamu Furusato (古里 おさむ, Furusato Osamu). His debut EP Yuuyake (夕焼け, Yūyake) was released on May 13, 2009.

== History ==
Originally a solo artist on Quruli's music label Noise McCartney Records, Osamu Furusato had performed under his own name and released an album titled Roadshow (ロードショー, Rōdoshō) in 2004. In 2006, Furusato then formed a group under the name Umineco Sunrize (ウミネコサンライズ, Umineko Sanraizu) and began recording various demos, including the songs "Yuuyake" (夕焼け, Yūyake), "Tori no Uta" (鳥のうた), and "Kaigansen Groovy" (海岸線グルーヴィー, Kaigansen Gurūvī). Furusato would later change the name of his group to Umineco Sounds and move to the Cinra Records label.

On April 22, 2009, his debut single on Cinra Records "Yuuyake" was featured as the Japanese iTunes Store's Free Single of the Week. The group was also featured on the music download site Recommuni (now Ototoy) in one of its close-ups, where Furusato says he got the idea for "Yuuyake" (which literally translates as "sunset"), by watching the sunset while in Shibuya, even though he was born in Aomori Prefecture. In an interview posted on Cinra Records' website, Furusato claims The Blue Hearts and Unicorn as some of his inspirations for entering the music field. For the recording of Yuuyake, Furusato worked with HiGE's drummer Koichi "Koteisui" Sato, GOMES THE HITMAN's bassist Toshiaki Sudoh, and WATER WATER CAMEL's guitarist and sound producer Gen Tanabe. His second album Utyu Ryoko was released on the CINRA RECORDS label on January 20, 2010. To record the album, he worked with Sato, Sudoh, and Tanabe once more. Furusato claims he got the inspiration for the title track from Kenji Miyazawa's Night on the Galactic Railroad; it is about following ones dreams even if they are almost impossible to reach. "Tegami" is about his parents, particularly his father who died shortly before the release of the album.

On February 1, 2012, Umineco Sounds, now calling themselves uminecosounds, released a "one-coin single" titled "Saru to Banana". Furusato's backing band consisted of Toshiaki Sudoh and Koichi "Kotetisui" Sato once more, but included guitarist Kazuhide Yamaji as well. This line-up continued to work together for the recording of uminecosounds' debut studio self-titled album, released June 6, 2012.

== Discography ==
=== Singles ===
- "Yuuyake" (夕焼け, Yūyake) - April 22, 2009 (iTunes Store)
- "Saru to Banana" (サルとバナナ) - February 1, 2012

=== Albums ===
1. Roadshow (ロードショー, Rōdoshō) - September 26, 2007
2. Yuuyake (夕焼け, Yūyake) - May 13, 2009
3. Utyu Ryoko (宇宙旅行, Uchū Ryokō) - January 20, 2010
4. uminecosounds - June 6, 2012
5. Miso (味噌) - May 27, 2020
