= Kannivalism =

Japanese visual kei rock band

kannivalism
- Origin: Kanagawa, Japan
- Genres: Alternative rock; post-rock; experimental rock
- Years active: 2001, 2006-2011
- Labels: Free-Will; Sony; HPQ/Avex
- Past members: ryo Kei; Yuchi; Mitsuya; Kiri
- Website: kannivalism.com

Kannivalism (stylized kannivalism) was a Japanese visual kei rock band originally formed in 2001, signed to Free-Will and distributed by Avex Trax. However, they disbanded that same year when baroque was formed, and subsequently reformed with new bassist Yuchi after baroque disbanded in 2006.

== History ==
=== First formation and restart ===
kannivalism, in their original lineup, performed their first concert on February 2, 2001 and performed their last concert June 20, 2001 at a one-man (a concert with no opening act); they disbanded after releasing a few demos, and one single, "kannivalism Ittekimasu".

kannivalism reformed in 2006. In April 2006, they released their first mini-album, Soukou Humority, which caught mainstream attention and the fans of baroque. Soon after in September 2006, the band released their first major-label single, "Ritori", followed by their second "Hoshi no Yoru" in January 2007. Later in February 2007, kannivalism finally debuted their first full-length album, Nu Age., which included many popular songs from the previous releases of 2006-07. Again in mid-2007 they released two more singles: "Small World", which included a rerecorded version of "Cry Bab"y as well as the track the single was named for; and "Monochrome", which included alternative covers and content.

=== End of hiatus ===
The band went into an indefinite hiatus after ryo's hospitalization for depression in 2008. In August 2009, kannivalism's official website announced that they would resume activities. A new drummer, Mitsuya, would be joining the band's lineup as well.

The band's period of new activity brings new singles and a full album. Their first new song after reforming, "Life Is", became available on mu-mo on September 9, 2009. A new single is to be released in November, along with a new album in 2010. A live concert to commemorate their return is set for December 26, 2009 at Zepp Tokyo.

Random House will be publishing an autobiographical work by vocalist ryo in English, describing his experience with depression.

While not officially stated, the reformation of baroque in 2012 has halted Kannivalism activity. Since then, Yuchi has been performing with sukekiyo.

== Former members ==
- ryo (怜) - vocals (baroque)
- Kei (圭) - guitar (baroque)
- Yuchi (裕地) - bass (ex-Anti Feminism, K@mikaze, Sukekiyo)
- Mitsuya (光也) - drums (ex-Black Jack)
- Kiri (桐) Koishikawa - drums (ex-Porori, Unzu, heidi.) (2001)

== Discography ==
Albums and EPs

Title	Release date	Ranking (Oricon)
Soukou Humority (奏功 Humority)	(April 26, 2006)	--
Nu Age.	(February 21, 2007)	#13
Helios	(March 17, 2010)	--

Singles

Title	Release date	Ranking (Oricon)
"kannivalism Ittekimasu." (kannivalism逝ってキマス)	(July 29, 2001)	--
"Ritori" (リトリ)	(September 27, 2006)	#7
"Hoshi no Yoru" (ホシの夜)	(January 17, 2007)	#10
"Small World"	(May 9, 2007)	#9
"Monochrome" (Opening theme for Suteki Tantei Labyrinth aired on TV Tokyo)	(November 14, 2007)	#12
"Life Is"	(November 18, 2009)	#22
"『Split Recollection』"	(August 11, 2010)	#33
"Rememorārī"	(November 24, 2010)	

Compilations

- Luna Sea Memorial Cover Album - covering "Love Song" (December 19, 2007)
