= Key Party Records =

Japanese independent record label

Key Party Records was a Japanese independent record label established in 1997 by Henry Lee Euro, known as the vocalist for the band Speed-ID. The company had both a recording studio and a design studio focusing on visual kei bands of a similar style of music and dress. The Key Party label went on to sign bands like Aliene Ma'riage, Noir Fleurir and Missalina Rei. Key Party was eventually incorporated into Enamell Records, which has since become defunct.

May 3–5, 2005, there was a three-day Key Party 2005 revival, consisting of a Q&A and two concerts in the style of the labels Hold Your Key concerts. The first concert featured a line-up of original Key Party bands; the second concert featured the current bands of members of former Key Party bands.

== Signed bands ==
- Aliene Ma'riage
- Crow (later Kagrra,)
- Eliphas Levi
- Lar~Mia
- Missalina Rei consisted of four members: Arisu Arisugawa, Hiro, Aya, and Kazui. In 1999, the comedic song "Tokimeki" (ト・キ・メ・キ, December 16, 1999) was released via Enamell Records and it reached number 85 on the Oricon Single Weekly Chart.
- Neil
- Noir Fleurir (formerly Deflower)
- Noi'x
- Rapture
- Speed-id

== Label Discography ==
=== CD ===
- Hold Your Key - Dual Shock Version Directors Cut
- Hold Your Key Kagi o Nigire! 1999 (Hold Your Key 鍵を握れ! 1999) (Feb 24 1999)
- Hold Your Key - Dual Shock Version 1999.5.30 Shibuya Public Hall (渋谷公会堂)
- Hold Your Key 2000

=== Video ===
- Hold Your Key 1999 (1999)
- The End of Century ~Key Party Omnibus Live Video (Mar 23 1999)
- Hold You Key 2000 (Jan 21 2000)
- Key Party All Stars-Hold Your Key 05 (2005)
