= Haruka to Miyuki =

Japanese folk-rock duo

- Origin: Japan
- Genres: Japanese pop; Folk rock
- Years active: 2012–present
- Labels: H+M Records / Sony Music Associated Records
- Members: Haruka (Vocals, Guitar); Miyuki (Keyboard, Chorus)
- Website: harukatomiyuki.net

Haruka to Miyuki (ハルカトミユキ) are a female folk-rock duo based in Japan. They first met in 2008 at the Rikkyo University music club.

== Biography ==
On November 14, 2012, they released their first EP "Kyogensha ga Yoake wo Tsugeru. Bokutachi ga Itsumademo Damatteiruto Omouna" (虚言者が夜明けを告げる。僕達が、いつまでも黙っていると思うな) under the independent record label H+M Records.

In early 2013, they were named as one of the "NEW ARTISTS 2013" by iTunes Store.

In March 2013, their song "Dry Ice" (ドライアイス) from their newly released second EP was frequently played on national radio stations and music TV channels. The song charted at number 19 on Billboard Japan Hot 100 music chart.

On November 6, 2013, their first full album "Cyano Type" (シアノタイプ) was released under their new contract with major record label Sony Music Associated Records.

On August 30, 2014, they performed in Taiwan at "StreetVoice Park Park Carnival", a street music carnival located at Taipei Expo Park.

On October 3, 2015, they performed a concert at Hibiya Open-Air Concert Hall for a 3000-person crowd. A digital live album titled "Hitori×3000 LIVE at Hibiya Yagai Ongakudo 20151003" (ひとり×3000 LIVE at 日比谷野外大音楽堂20151003) was released on December 23, 2015 containing 14 songs from the event.

== Members ==
Haruka (ハルカ)

- Vocals, Guitar, and Lyrics
- Birthday: October 2, 1989 (age 36)
- Full Name: Haruka Fukushima (福島遥)

Haruka writes tanka poetry and released a mini songbook titled "Kono Natsu no Hanashi" (この夏の話; The Story of this Summer) containing newly written poems to celebrate Haruka to Miyuki's first acoustic live concert on September 20, 2014.

Miyuki (ミユキ)

- Keyboard, Chorus
- Birthday: November 16, 1989 (age 35)

Miyuki is a fan of Kurt Cobain and Freddie Mercury.

== Discography ==
=== Demos ===
- 1st Demo
1. Natsu no Uta (夏のうた; Summer Song)
2. Bokutachi wa (僕達は; We Are)
- 2nd Demo
1. Apart (アパート)
2. Sora (空; Sky)
3. Suisō (水槽; Aquarium)
4. Bokutachi wa (僕達は; We Are)
- 3rd Demo
1. Magenta (マゼンタ)
2. MONDAY
3. POOL
4. 385

=== Singles ===
	Release date	Title	Serial number	Track list	Notes
1st	November 14, 2018	17 Sai (17 才; 17 Years Old)	AICL-3593/94/95	4 Tracks: 1. 17 Sai (17才; 17 Years Old); 2. Asayake wa End Roll Youni (朝焼けはエンドロールのように; Morning glow is like end roll); 3. Sonna Umi wa Dokonimonai (そんな海はどこにもない; There's no such ocean anywhere); 4. 17 Sai (Betsu ver.) (17才 (別ver.); 17 Years Old (the other ver.))	Label: Sony Music Associated Records; 17 Sai (Betsu ver.) is only included in AICL-3593/94.

=== Digital singles ===
- Vanilla (October 31, 2012)
- Mannequin (マネキン) (October 9, 2013)
- mosaic (October 23, 2013)
- Sekai (世界; The World) (January 21, 2015)
- Usotsuki (嘘ツキ; Liar) (February 18, 2015)
- Kimi wa Mada Shiranai (君はまだ知らない; You Don't Know Yet) (March 18, 2015)
- Haru no Ame (春の雨; Spring Rain) (May 20, 2015)
- COPY (June 24, 2015)
- Uchuu wo Oyogu Fune (宇宙を泳ぐ舟; Ship that Sails Through Space) (July 29, 2015)
- Koutei Suru (肯定する; Affirm) (September 9, 2015)
- new moon (October 28, 2015)
- LIFE (November 25, 2015)
- World Wide Web wa Shinderu (ワールドワイドウエブは死んでる; The World Wide Web is Dead) (December 23, 2015)
- Koi wa Mahō sa (恋は魔法さ; Love is Magic) (January 27, 2016)
- Kiseki wo Inoru Koto wa Mō Shinai (奇跡を祈ることはもうしない; No Longer Praying For a Miracle) (June 22, 2016)
- DRAG & HUG (August 3, 2016)
- Asayake wa End Roll Youni (朝焼けはエンドロールのように; Morning glow is like end roll) (Aug 31, 2018)
- 17 Sai (17才; 17 Years Old) (Oct 15, 2018)

=== Digital albums ===
- Hitori×3000 LIVE at Hibiya Yagai Ongakudo 20151003 (ひとり×3000 LIVE at 日比谷野外大音楽堂20151003; One×3000 LIVE at Hibiya Open-Air Concert Hall 20151003) (December 23, 2015)

=== EPs ===
	Release date	Title	Serial number	Track List	Notes
1st	November 14, 2012	Kyogensha ga Yoake wo Tsugeru. Bokutachi ga Itsumademo Damatteiruto Omouna (虚言者が夜明けを告げる。僕たちが、いつまでも黙っていると思うな。; A Liar Announces The Daybreak. I Think We'll Remain Silent Forever.)	PECF-3030	5 Tracks: 1. Vanilla; 2. Plastic Metro (プラスチック・メトロ); 3. MONDAY; 4. Apart (アパート); 5. Zetsubou Gokko (絶望ごっこ; Make-believe Despair)	Label: H+M Records; Oricon Rank: 299
2nd	March 13, 2013	Mayonaka no Kotoba wa Aoi Doku ni Nari, Niburu Sekai ni Hiyari to Sasaru. (真夜中の言葉は青い毒になり、鈍る世界にヒヤリと刺さる。; Words Said at Midnight Become Blue Poison, Stuck and Scared in a Dull World.)	PECF-3040	6 Tracks: 1. Dry Ice (ドライアイス); 2. Newton no Ringo (ニュートンの林檎; Newton's Apple); 3. POOL; 4. Good Morning, Good Night (グッドモーニング、グッドナイト); 5. Miseinen (未成年; Minor); 6. Bokutachi wa (僕達は; We Are) (iTunes Bonus Track)	Label: H+M Records; Oricon Rank: 160
3rd	May 28, 2014	Sonna Koto Dou Datte Ii, Kono Uta wo Kimi ga Suki da to Itte Kuretara. (そんなことどうだっていい、この歌を君が好きだと言ってくれたら。; Never Mind If That Song Says That I Love You)	AICL-2689	5 Tracks: 1. Sono Hi ga Kitara (その日がきたら; When That Day Comes); 2. Akaku Nure (赤くぬれ; Dyed in Red); 3. Katakute Yawarakai (かたくてやわらかい; Hard and Soft); 4. 385; 5. Aoi Yufuke (青い夜更け; Blue Late Night)	Label: Sony Music Associated Records; Oricon Rank: 54

=== Mini-albums ===
	Release date	Title	Serial number	Track List	Notes
1st	April 22, 2015	Sekai (世界; The World)	AICL-2859/60 (Limited Edition); AICL-2861 (Regular Edition)	7 Tracks + 4 DVD Tracks CD: 1. Sekai (世界; The World); 2. tonight 3. Magenta (マゼンタ); 4. Kimi wa Mada Shiranai (君はまだ知らない; You Don't Know Yet); 5. Bad End no Tsuzuki wo (バッドエンドの続きを; The Bad Ending Continues); 6. Yogurt Holic (ヨーグルト・ホリック); 7. Usotsuki (嘘ツキ; Liar); DVD (Limited Edition Only); Harmony #1 2015.02.06 at Tokyo Cinema Club: 1. Shuu Basu (終バス; Last Bus); 2. Usotsuki (嘘ツキ; Liar); 3. Newton no Ringo (ニュートンの林檎; Newton's Apple); 4. Aoi Yufuke (青い夜更け; Blue Late Night)	Label: Sony Music Associated Records; Oricon Rank: 55; Taiwan Release: April 24, 2015
2nd	September 30, 2015	LIFE	AICL-2962/63 (Limited Edition); AICL-2964 (Regular Edition)	7 Tracks + 19 DVD Tracks CD: 1. Koutei Suru (肯定する; Affirm); 2. Uchuu wo Oyogu Fune (宇宙を泳ぐ舟; Ship That Sails Through Space); 3. Haru no Ame (春の雨; Spring Rain); 4. COPY; 5. All I want 6. September; 7. Hi no Tori (火の鳥; Phoenix); DVD (Limited Edition Only); One Man Live 2015 'Sekai' 2015.06.19 at LIQUIDROOM: 1. Sekai (世界; The World); 2. Bad End no Tsuzuki wo (バッドエンドの続きを; The Bad Ending Continues); 3. Yoghurt Holic (ヨーグルト・ホリック); 4. Miseinen (未成年; Minor); 5. Magenta (マゼンタ); 6. Haru no Ame (春の雨; Spring Rain); 7. Kimi wa Mada Shiranai (君はまだ知らない; You Don't Know Yet); 8. Nagareboshi (流星; Shooting Star) (Takuro Yoshida Cover); 9. COPY; 10. Sono Hi ga Kitara (その日がきたら; When That Day Comes); 11. Usotsuki (嘘ツキ; Liar); 12. Furidashi ni Modoru (振り出しに戻る; Back To The Start); 13. tonight 14. Newton no Ringo (ニュートンの林檎; Newton's Apple); 15. Mannequin (マネキン); 16. Plastic Metro (プラスチック・メトロ); 17. Aoi Yufuke (青い夜更け; Blue Late Night); 18. Dry Ice (ドライアイス); 19. Vanilla	Label: Sony Music Associated Records; Oricon Rank: 59

=== Albums ===
	Release date	Title	Serial number	Track List	Notes
1st	November 6, 2013	Cyano Type (シアノタイプ)	AICL-2598	12 Tracks: 1. Keshigomu (消しゴム; Eraser); 2. Mannequin (マネキン); 3. Dry Ice (ドライアイス); 4. mosaic 5. Hate you 6. Cyano Type (シアノタイプ); 7. 7nonsense 8. Furidashi ni Modoru (振り出しに戻る; Back To The Start); 9. Dengon Game (伝言ゲーム; Message Game); 10. Nagai Machiawase (長い待ち合わせ; Long Waiting); 11. Knife (ナイフ); 12. Vanilla	Label: Sony Music Associated Records; Oricon Rank: 62
2nd	August 17, 2016	LOVELESS/ARTLESS	AICL-3133/34 (Limited Edition); AICL-3135 (Regular Edition)	10 Tracks + 12 DVD Tracks CD: 1. Hikare (光れ; Shine); 2. DRAG & HUG; 3. Kiseki wo Inoru Koto wa Mō Shinai (奇跡を祈ることはもうしない; No Longer Praying For a Miracle); 4. Pain; 5. Are you ready?; 6. Miru Mae ni Odore (見る前に踊れ; Dance Before Looking); 7. Tokyo Utopia (トーキョー・ユートピア); 8. Eien no Temae (永遠の手前; Eternal You); 9. you 10. Yoake no Tsuki (夜明けの月; The Moon At Dawn); DVD (Limited Edition Only); Promotional Videos: 1. Sekai (世界; The World); 2. Usotsuki (嘘ツキ; Liar); 3. Kimi wa Mada Shiranai (君はまだ知らない; You Don't Know Yet); 4. Haru no Ame (春の雨; Spring Rain); 5. COPY; 6. Uchuu wo Oyogu Fune (宇宙を泳ぐ舟; Ship that Sails Through Space); 7. Koutei Suru (肯定する; Affirm); 8. new moon 9. LIFE; 10. World Wide Web wa Shinderu (ワールドワイドウエブは死んでる; The World Wide Web is Dead); 11. Koi wa Mahō sa (恋は魔法さ; Love is Magic); 12. Kiseki wo Inoru Koto wa Mō Shinai (奇跡を祈ることはもうしない; No Longer Praying For a Miracle)	Label: Sony Music Associated Records; Oricon Rank: 36
3rd	June 28, 2017	Tameiki no Danmenzu (溜息の断面図)	AICL-3354/55 (Limited Edition); AICL-3356 (Regular Edition)	12 Tracks + 14 Tracks CD 1: 1. Warabe Uta (わらべうた; Nursery Rhyme); 2. Stand Up, Baby; 3. Sunny, Cloudy; 4. Owari no Hajimari (終わりの始まり; Beginning of The End); 5. Fairy Trash Tale; 6. WILL (Ending Note); 7. Takaramono (宝物; Treasure); 8. Kingan no Zombie (近眼のゾンビ; Shortsighted Zombie); 9. Instant Love (インスタントラブ); 10. Boku wa Machi wo Dete Yuku (僕は街を出てゆく; I'll Leave The City); 11. Arashi no Funy (嵐の舟; Stormy Boat); 12. Tane wo Maku Hito (種を蒔く人; The Sower); CD 2 (Limited Edition Only); LIVE at Hibiya Open-Air Concert Hall on 2016/9/24: 1. Sekai (世界; The World); 2. Bad End no Tsuzuki wo (バッドエンドの続きを; The Bad Ending Continues); 3. Hate you 4. Pain; 5. Kiseki wo Inoru Koto wa Mō Shinai (奇跡を祈ることはもうしない; No Longer Praying For a Miracle); 6. Yoake no Tsuki (夜明けの月; The Moon At Dawn); 7. Are you ready?; 8. Miru Mae ni Odore (見る前に踊れ; Dance Before Looking); 9. DRAG & HUG; 10. Furidashi ni Modoru (振り出しに戻る; Back To The Start); 11. Newton no Ringo (ニュートンの林檎; Newton's Apple); 12. Hikare (光れ; Shine); 13. LIFE 2; 14. Dry Ice (ドライアイス)	Label: Sony Music Associated Records; Oricon Rank: 58

=== DVDs ===
	Release date	Title	Serial number	Track List	Notes
1st	August 12, 2013	Dry Vanilla Ice (ドライ・バニラアイス)	PEBF-4001	13 Tracks: 1. POOL; 2. Dry Ice (ドライアイス); 3. Mannequin (マネキン); 4. MONDAY; 5. Miseinen (未成年; Minor); 6. Natsu no Uta (夏のうた; Summer Song); 7. Good Morning, Good Night (グッドモーニング、グッドナイト); 8. Apart (アパート); 9. Zetsubou Gokko (絶望ごっこ; Make-believe Despair); 10. Hiyari to Miyuki (ヒヤリトミユキ; Hiyari and Miyuki); 11. Newton no Ringo (ニュートンの林檎; Newton's Apple); 12. Plastic Metro (プラスチック・メトロ); 13. Vanilla	Label: H+M Records; Limited Sales
2nd	May 28, 2014	SCHOOL OF LOCK! Ongaku Shitsu LIVE SESSION #1 -Haruka to Miyuki- (SCHOOL OF LOCK! 音楽室 LIVE SESSION #1 -ハルカトミユキ-)	AIBL-9294	5 Tracks: 1. Mannequin (マネキン); 2. mosaic 3. Cyano Type (シアノタイプ); 4. Dry Ice (ドライアイス); 5. Vanilla	Label: Sony Music Associated Records; Oricon Rank: 48

=== Compilation albums ===
	Release date	Title	Serial number	Track List	Notes
1st	November 27, 2013	NACHT MUSIK ～Sleepless Night Music Collection～ (ナハト・ムジィク ～眠れぬ夜の眠れる音楽集～)	musica-01	11 Tracks: 1. Lullaby from Street Lights / Predawn; 2. Owaranai Kyōkai (終わらない境界) / THE NOVEMBERS; 3. Itsuka Mata Hohoemi Aeru Hi ga Kuru Made (いつかまた微笑みあえる日が来るまで) / Abe Fuyumi (阿部芙蓉美); 4. Yoru no Pēji (夜のページ) / PERIDOTS; 5. earth / sleepy.ab 6. Good Morning, Good Night (グッドモーニング、グッドナイト) / Haruka to Miyuki (ハルカトミユキ); 7. Yakan Hikō (夜間飛行) / APOGEE; 8. Command Z / Neat's; 9. Jibun (自分) / Misako Odani (小谷美紗子); 10. Johnny Cliche / TICA; 11. Fukurō Kujira (ふくろうクジラ) / Kensuke Yamauchi (山内憲介)	Label: musica allegra; Limited Sales
