= The Candy Spooky Theater =

Japanese visual kei rock band

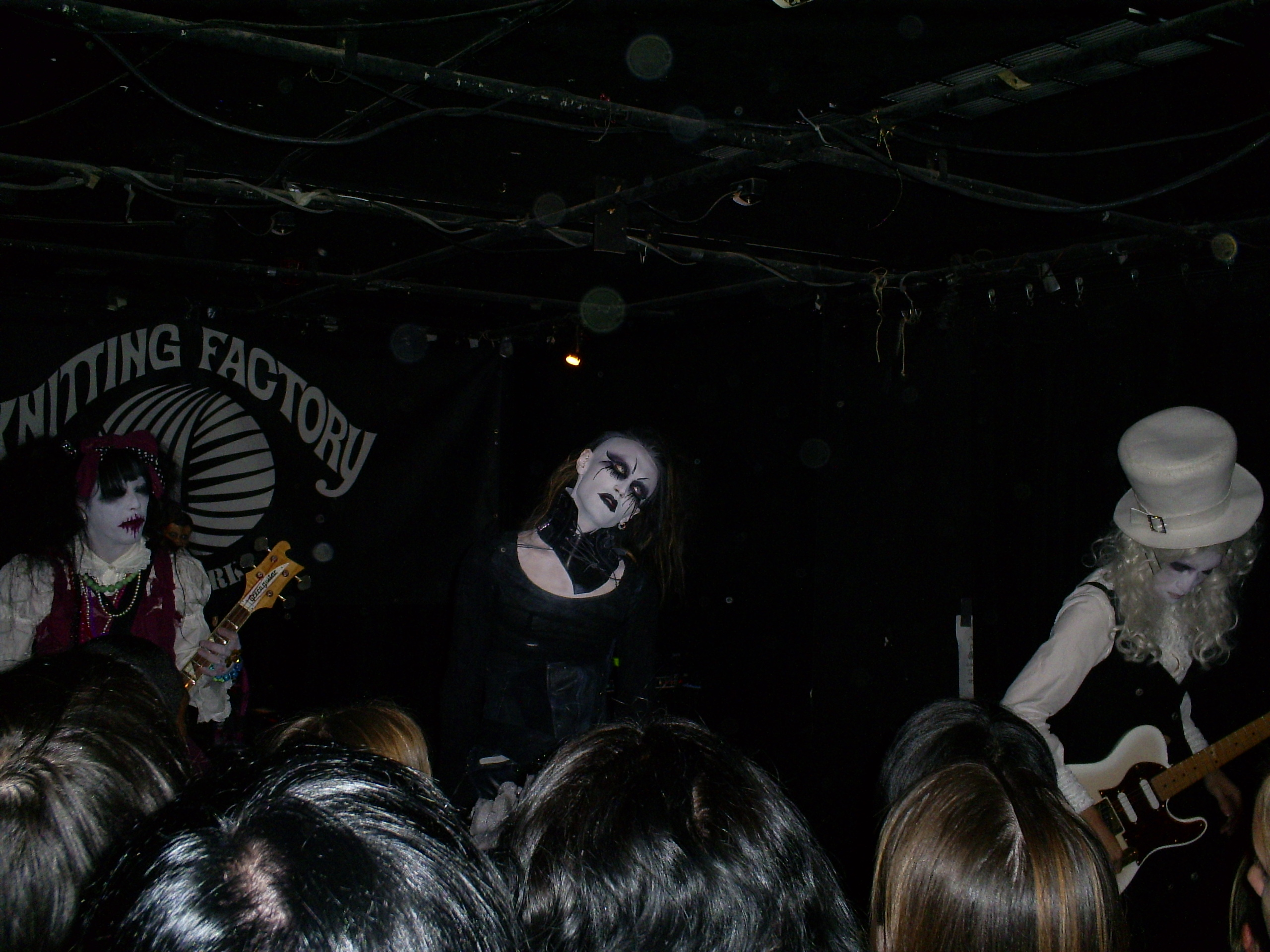
- The Candy Spooky Theater playing live in NYC

Background information
- Origin: Japan
- Genres: Industrial rock; dark wave; experimental
- Years active: 2003–2014, 2024
- Members: Jack Spooky; Peggy Giggles; Kal Bone Jr.
- Past members: Zull; Kiddy Skeleton
- Website: www.thecandyspookytheater.com

The Candy Spooky Theater (ザ キャンディー スプーキー シアター) was a Japanese visual kei rock band, who debuted in 2005 with the single "Pumpkins Scream in the Dead of Night Parade". The band was made up of three members: Jack Spooky, Kal Bone Jr., and Peggy Giggles, and their music was driven by Tim Burton-like horror influences under the concept of "Comical Horror Halloween Party".

== History ==
The band formed in February 2003 by Jack Spooky, but prior to that Jack Spooky and Peggy were in a band together called Dororo (however, then Jack was known as Shati and Peggy was known as MeiLa (迷La)). The band later in 2004 started to release music, under their own label called Candy Makers (CM(S)).

They debuted with the four-track single "Pumpkins Scream in the Dead of Night Parade", which was limited to 1,000 copies. From there on, they released three more singles and were featured on a three-track single called "Mikkai". They have also released their first full-length album, Living Dead Spooky Doll's Family in the Rock n' Childs Spook Show Baby!!, on March 23, 2007, through the German record label Trisol.

They finished their first U.S. tour called Comical Horror's Wonder Land East Coast Showcase Tour which ran from May 20–22, 2007.

They released their most recent work, SpookyWonderland, on October 1, 2010.

The band announced the cessation of "all activities with the performance of the June 6, 2014".

In 2024, the band announced that they would reunite after ten years to perform a single gig at the Shibuya Club Malcom on November 1, 2024.

== Members ==
Current

- Jack Spooky – vocals, programming
- Peggy Giggles – bass guitar
- Kal Bone Jr. – guitar

Past

- Zull – guitar (left May 2007, moved to Monaural Curve)
- Kiddy Skeleton – guitar (left September 2008)

== Discography ==
Albums

- Living Dead Spooky Doll's Family in the Rock n' Childs Spook Show Baby!! (2007.03.23)
- SpookyWonderland (2010.10.01)

'Singles

- "Pumpkins Scream in the Dead of Night Parade" (2004.03.21)
- "Wonderland" (2005.09.09)
- "Murderland" (2005.10.31)
- "The Bedroom" (2006.07.05)
- "Prince of Darkness" (2007.10.01)
- "The Haunted House" (2009.02.02)

Other

- Mikkai (蜜会; A Sweet, Secret Meeting) (#2 Murder Factory in the Closet) (2006.05.06)
