= Devil Kitty =

Japanese visual kei rock band

- Origin: Japan
- Genres: Alternative metal; hard rock; experimental; pop rock; metalcore; deathcore
- Years active: 2002–2004, 2015-2018
- Labels: Luciffer's Record (2002-2004), ROCKSTAR RECORDS (2015-2016)
- Past members: Yuuga; Yura; Sasaki; Shita; Rin; Yuune; Totto; Reika; Kazuto; Akina; Ruchi; Majyu

Devil Kitty, stylized as DEViL KiTTY and DEVIL KITTY, were a Japanese visual kei rock band formed in 2002.

== History ==
The band formed in September 2002 by Yuuga, initially going under the pseudonym Paro. Soon after, Yura (ex-Misery and Kilah), Reika (ex-member from La'miss Fairy) and Yuune joined Devil Kitty, they released their first full album in November. Guitarist Reika left the band in February 2003, and Yuune departed in June of that year. After which various lineup changes occurred until stabilizing with Yura and Sasaki (ex member of Lυτёη∀) on guitar, Shita (ex. Loon Eye's Millyie) on bass and Rin (ex. Lilith Noir+) on Drums. Yuuga also owned a record label, Luciffer's Record which had Devil Kitty, as well as few other bands most notably Loon Eye's Millyie and Lυτёη∀. The ex. Vocalist of Lυτёη∀ is now in popular Visual Kei band Kiryu. Devil kitty disbanded on December 4, 2004 after their last live.

After disbanding, Yuuga started a solo project, but retired in 2006. He then revived his career in the band Gokiburi. Yura went on to join the popular visual kei band, Ghost with Rin, and then groups such as Hi:Brid and Kanabun. Sasaki later rejoined his Lυτёη∀ bandmates in the band MADARA, and then joined the popular band CELLT.

Much of Devil Kitty's work was only distributed at various live performances, and many releases were cancelled.

In 2015, Devil Kitty made an announcement stating their comeback, but with a completely different lineup with Kazuto on guitars, Ruchi on bass, and Majyu on drums. They have since toured extensively, and have released some material, but have paused activities in 2018.

== Sound ==
Devil Kitty was initially known for their unique sound, erratically combining heavy metal with pop rock, with influences from Punk, and often had lo-fi production. When they reformed in 2015, they had switched to Metalcore and Deathcore, but kept the pop rock sound mixed in. Because of the completely different lineups and genre choices between the 2002 and 2015 Devil Kitty, Yuuga considers them to be different bands.

As with most of Yuuga's bands, Devil Kitty often took elements from their own songs as well as Yuuga's other projects combined them and released them as new. The most notable instance is Kikei no 2 channeler being a combination of his past Kar'MariA songs, Kikei no Egao and Dokuzetsu na 2channeler (the former itself a combination of two even earlier Yuuga songs, Smile and Kikei no Kimi he). This would continue in Yuuga's solo project and GOKIBURI, but ended with the formation of the 2015 Devil Kitty.

== Controversy ==
Devil Kitty was known for being involved in certain controversies. Songs such as Kikei no 2 channeler allude to past drama with the Japanese image board 2 channel. In 2003, a fan alleged that guitarist Totto had raped her. He was then fired from the band, and Yuuga asked people not to work with him or meet him on dating sites.

== Discography ==
=== Singles ===
- Eseikare Rock Star (エセイカレ☆ROCK STAR) October 23, 2003
- Vo.Shita (Vo.弑夕) - October 1, 2004

=== Albums ===
- Akuma Kicha (悪魔鬼茶) November 30, 2002, reissued December 23, 2002
- Akuma Kourin (-悪魔降臨-) August 11, 2004

=== EPs ===
- Kiai (鬼愛) May 5, 2003
- -Cobra- April 28, 2004
- -Fukou Jiman- (-不幸自慢-) May 26, 2004
- -Ware, Akumako- (-我、悪魔故-) June 30, 2004
