= Metronome (band) =

Japanese band

Metronome メトロノーム
- Origin: Japan
- Genres: Electropop
- Years active: 1998–2009; 2016–present
- Label: King; Art Pop; Tricycle
- Members: Sharaku; Riu; Fukusuke
- Past members: Yuuichirou; Shintarou; Kemumaki; Eye×G×A; Yaji; Asuka-Hime; Kei
- Website: Official site

Metronome (メトロノーム) is a Japanese visual kei rock band, which took its influence from many genres, including techno, rock, hardcore and pop.

== History ==
Metronome's gimmick was that they professed to have travelled from the future. Because they were getting bad record sales in 2005, they decided to travel back in time to 1998, thus boosting sales via their "futuristic" sound and look.

In a 2007 interview, Talbo-1 Fukusuke mentioned how they stopped with saying they were from the year 2005 as said year neared. The band apparently had thought they wouldn't still be around by the time 2005 rolled around. They went on hiatus in 2009 following their performance at the Shibuya Public Hall.

Later, in 2016, Riu was asked by the band's former management company, Art Pop, to perform a Metronome song as an encore with Fukusuke and Sharaku at the Crush of Mode -Hyper Hot Summer’16- music event in Shibuya. Riu met up with his bandmates to discuss the performance and they decided to get back together as a band. This led to their first single since their hiatus being released that September, "Kairisei Dōitsujinbutsu". The next year, they released a new full-length album, Continue, their first in nine years.

== Musical styles ==
They have also been described as gamewave and nintendocore. Their songs typically sampled video game, or video game inspired, sounds and while being based in rock, are heavily electronic as well. They have a total of 22 official releases, albums and singles. They maintained an indie career throughout their years, and were never a hot selling band among the visual kei scene, mainly due to their uncompromising approach to their sound.

== Members ==
Voicecoder: Sharaku Kobayashi 小林 写楽 {シャラク}
Birthday: 08.10
Current Bands: metronome, FLOPPY, Muchi muchi Anago, Cuckoo (カッコー), GalapagosS
Previous Bands: Picopico PON, Propellerheads

Talbo-1: Fukusuke Fukuda {フクスケ}
Birthday: 12.09
Current Bands: metronome, ADAPTER
Previous Bands: Picopico PON
Support for: FLOPPY

Talbo-2: Riu {リウ}
Birthday: 06.01
Current Bands: metronome, BEE-315
Previous Bands: SPICY DRY HOT MUSTARD

Ex members
Drums: Yuuichirou {ユウイチロー}
Birthday: 09.28
Current Bands: boogieman
Previous Bands: Fill or Kill, FeNeK, BADxTIMING, Mind Break, CUVE, metronome

Drums: Shintarou {シンタロー}
Birthday: 11.23
Current Bands: metronome, GalapagosS
Previous Bands:

Drums: Kemumaki {ケムマキ}

Guitar: Eye×G×A

Bass: Yaji {ヤジ}

Bass: Asuka-Hime {アスカ姫}

Bass: KEI

== Discography ==
Albums
YAPUU Ga Shoukansareta Machi (2000)
Fukigen Na ANDROID (2002)
1 Metronome (2003)
UNKNOWN (2004)
LIFO (2004)
Electric Travel (2005)
Cycle Recycle (2007)
HIGH TO LOW ELECTRO (2008)
COLLECTION (2008)
COLLECTION 2 (2008)
CONTINUE (2017)

Singles
Single Top Religion (1999)
PLASTIC-MODELS Kuro (2001)
PLASTIC-MODELS Shirogane (2001)
Planet (2002)
Self Control (2002)
Mittsu Kazoero (2003)
S.P.A.C.E. Romantic (2003)
Mousou Trick (2004)
Isshukan (2004)
Computer (2004)
Oboro/Sora (2005)
Boku Sonzaisetsu (2006)
Zetsubou-San (2006)
Tawainai Twillight (2007)
Zombie-Kun (2007)
Kairisei Doitsujinbutsu (2016)

DVD
サイクルリサイクル～メーDAY X'mas～ (2007)
10th Anniversary Special ONE MAN LIVE @2008.8.25SHIBUYA-AX since2005→1998→2008 (2009)
