= Hidari (band) =

- Origin: Kobe, Japan
- Genres: Indie, Pop, Rock
- Years active: 2003–present
- Labels: Bad News Records
- Members: Hiroshi Ohta, Yukihiro
- Website: zousanrecords.com/hidari/

Hidari (ヒダリ) is a rock band from Kobe, Japan, known for its combination of modern rock and retro electronic sounds.

== Members ==
- Hiroshi Ohta (太田宏) - guitar, vocals
- Yukihiro (ユキヒロ) - mecha

== Former members ==
- Hiroshi "Yoma" Aoki (青木ヨーマ), electronics, keyboards
- Justin Bacon (ジャスティン ベイコン), mecha
- Daisuke Kouzuki (上月大介) - bass, backup vocals

== Name ==
The word hidari means "left" in Japanese, though the actual origin of the band's name comes from the first syllable of each of the three founding members' names, "Hiroshi", "Daisuke", and "Ryosuke". For that reason, it is spelled in the phonetic alphabet of katakana instead of the more representative kanji.

== Discography ==
ヒダリの「ヒ」	Hidari's "Hi"	June 2004	Handmade Demo
ヒダリの「ダ」	Hidari's "Da"	September 2004	Handmade Demo
ヒダリスムージー	Hidari Smoothie	May 2005	Handmade Demo
ピタリ！	Pitari!	February 15, 2006	EP
ヒダリのしっぽ	Hidari's tail	December 13, 2006	Debut album
ワインとチョコレート	Wine and Chocolate	March 4, 2009	Second full album
