= G-On Riders =

Japanese anime television series

G-onらいだーす
- Created by: KATSUZO; TNK
- Anime television series
- Directed by: Shinichiro Kimura
- Produced by: Mitsuteru Shibata (Movic)
- Written by: Seishi Minakami
- Music by: Norimasa Yamanaka
- Studio: TNK; Shaft
- Original network: Wowow
- Original run: July 2, 2002 – October 1, 2002
- Episodes: 13 + OVA

G-On Riders (G-onらいだーす) is a Japanese anime series animated by TNK and Shaft. The "G" in "G-On" stands for "Glasses". Every female character in the series (including in one brief shot the Statue of Liberty) wears glasses, hence the title. The character designs are intended to both parody and glorify the meganekko fetish among many anime fans. Other fetishes the anime uses include maids, sailor uniform, nurses, lolitas, and nuns.

== Plot ==
In the near future, most of the Earth has been conquered by aliens. However, a small region in Japan has successfully repelled them thanks to the development of "G-On" technology by the Grand Rifurekuto Amudo/Grand Reflect Armed (GRA). This technology involves a band of girls (at first two, then three) who channel energy through special glasses. In this way they are able to destroy the giant mechanized monsters, "Fancy Beasts", sent by the aliens.

== Music ==
- Opening Theme: "トキメイテ、G-on G!" (Tokimeite, G-on G!) by Shima Ryouka, Omi Minami, and Kurata Masayo
- Ending Theme: "ミラクル☆パジャマ" (Miracle Pajama) by Lolivaders Z

== Characters ==
=== The GRA ===
- Yuuki Kurama (Voiced by: Ryōka Shima): The main heroine and the only girl who doesn't wear glasses at the very start. She possesses abnormal strength and is the last of the G-On Riders to join. In the first episode, she loses her panties (which have strawberries on them) in a monster attack and they fall into the hands of Ichiro, who struggles to return them to her. Eventually he does return them. However, Yuuki losing her panties is a running gag in the series. She also on occasion loses all her clothing, such as during the final battle.
- Ichiro Hongo (Voiced by: Nobuyuki Hiyama): The male lead of the story. He is deeply infatuated with Yuuki and much of the series has him trying to confess to her. During the first several episodes, he comes into possession a pair of Yuuki's panties, which he spends time trying to return. Whenever he pictures Yuuki not wearing her panties or sees her naked, he has a tendency to get a nose bleed. When he finally confesses his love to Yuuki, she tells him she loves him...and everybody else. Yayoi, Sera, and Zero all harbor romantic feelings for him. When he was younger, he was accidentally hit by a falling spaceship and given a cyborg body. This allows him to transform into the warrior Cosmo Banchou, a parody of Tuxedo Kamen from Sailor Moon. The transformation is triggered whenever he experiences moments of intense sexual desire. By the end of the OVA, it appears he becomes engaged to Zero because of a galactic rule which may or may not be true.
- Sera Arashiyama (Voiced by: Omi Minami): A warrior but is also a nun. She has the second largest breasts in the series, second only to Nurse Sanada. She falls in love with Ichiro after she finds out he can become Cosmo Banchou (which was almost right away) and tries to seduce him on multiple occasions with no success.
- Yayoi Hoshikawa (Voiced by: Masayo Kurata): An apparent Shinto priestess. She has an extreme shyness towards males and cannot have them come within a certain distance, otherwise she'll forcefully fling them into the air. The only man able to come closer than the usual distance is Ichiro, who she is fond of. However, even he is thrown a dozen or so times even when she herself is trying to get closer to him. She's the only one of the Riders to need her glasses for eyesight reasons. Like Sera, she eventually fails in her attempts to seduce Ichiro.
- Nurse Mio Sanada (Voiced by: Aya Hisakawa): The school nurse and inventor of the G-On technology wielded by Yuuki, Sera, and Yayoi. She has the largest breasts of the entire female cast. Her true identity is that of Mako's younger sister (her real name is simply Sana). At some point in the past, she fell through a time warp and was aged several million years, causing her to go from the body of a 10-year-old into a 20-something. She built Zero and created both the Maiden and Man Circuits. When she first came to Earth, her spaceship hit Ichiro and she transformed him into a cyborg, implanting the Man Circuit within him.

=== The Aliens ===
- Zero (Voiced by: Yukari Tamura): An android maid who serves Pao, Ai, and Mako. She follows the code of "Intergalactic Maid Law", which has rules such as allowing maids one day off a year. She is the strongest fighter the aliens have and battles Ichigo several times. She eventually switches sides to the GRA after falling in love with Cosmic Banchou. She was built by Sanada and has a "Maiden Chip" within her that reacts to Ichiro's presence. While an android, the Maiden Chip allows her to feel love and she actively pursues Ichiro's attention several times. According to the OVA, she is successful, as Sanada gives her permission to marry Ichiro after he becomes (unknowingly) engaged to her by accepting the gift of a rose.
- Ai (Voiced by: Takako Uemura): A green haired alien who is the first to realize that humans are good and that Earth is a nice place to live. She eventually quits trying to attack earth and befriends Yayoi.
- Pao (Voiced by: Miki Machii): A catgirl alien who leads most of the "Fancy Beast" attacks on Earth. When she finally decides to quit attacking, she becomes Sela's maid. Sela treats her harshly, making her clean her room and other laborious tasks. She is several times pursued by random otaku who find a loli catgirl maids to be irresistible. She is also addicted to video games, with Sela uses to control her.
- Mako (Voiced by: Kaori Mizuhashi): Nurse Sanada's older sister, even though Mako is physically younger due to Sanada having fallen into a time warp. She communicates with Riro through a pair of bobbly antennas on her head, which Riro later uses to mentally control her. Yuuki saves her from this mind control with the help of Sanada, Pao, Ai, and Zero. She is the leader of the aliens and also pilots the alien's pink UFO.
- Riro (Voiced by: Rie Kugimiya): The alien behind the attacks on Earth. She is physically the youngest of all the aliens. Over a hundred thousand years ago, Riro came to Earth and gave her glasses to a young primitive girl. These glasses were the catalyst that lead to the formation of human civilization. Riro's glasses eventually ended up in the possession of Yuuki. Without her glasses, Riro's heart became cold and she lost all emotions save for the desire to destroy. She is redeemed once Yuuki returns her glasses. Riro and Yuuki form a close bond by the end of the series.

== Episodes ==
The series was directed by Shinichiro Kimura at studios TNK and Shaft. Seishi Minakami served as series composition writer, and Norimasa Yamanaka served as the composer; and Katsuzou Hirata designed the characters and served as the chief animation director. Five episodes were outsourced outside of TNK and Shaft: episode 4 to J.C.Staff; episode 6 to Artland; episode 7 to A.P.P.P.; episode 10 to AIC; and episode 12 to Studio Tama. (Note: All outsourcing studios credited as Production Assistance (制作協力) for their respective episodes.)

Each episode is called a "Glass", to reinforce the meganekko theme. Episode 14 is the OVA, which went unaired due to more explicit content than the other episodes, including nudity and adult situations.

| No. | Title | Directed by (Note: Information is taken from the ending credits of each episode.) | Written by | Storyboarded by | Original release date |
|---|---|---|---|---|---|
| 1 | "Strawberry, Appear!"; Transliteration: "Tobidase! Ichigo" (Japanese: 飛び出せ! イチゴ) | Shinichiro Kimura | Seishi Minakami | Shinichiro Kimura | July 2, 2002 |
| 2 | "What are the Glasses?"; Transliteration: "Megane to Hananda" (Japanese: メガネとはなんだ) | Yorifusa Yamaguchi | Seishi Minakami | Hashiru Shimazu (Note: A pseudonym of Hiroyuki Shimazu.) | July 9, 2002 |
| 3 | "Get Angry, Sela!"; Transliteration: "Okore! Sela Da" (Japanese: おこれ! セーラだ) | Mitsuhiro Yoneda | Seishi Minakami | Mitsuhiro Yoneda | July 16, 2002 |
| 4 | "Hard Training, and the Middle!"; Transliteration: "Tokkundo Mannaka!" (Japanese: 特訓ド真中!) | Yorifusa Yamaguchi | Noboru Kimura | Tarou Mitsuishi | July 23, 2002 |
| 5 | "Yayoi Goes Straight!"; Transliteration: "Yayoi Icchokusen" (Japanese: ヤヨイ一直線) | Kunitoshi Okajima | Seishi Minakami | Jun Fukuta | July 30, 2002 |
| 6 | "Time to Train!"; Transliteration: "Shugyou Desu yo" (Japanese: 修行ですよ) | Tatsuyuki Nagai | Seishi Minakami | Tatsuyuki Nagai | August 6, 2002 |
| 7 | "The Tale of Seven Men and Women"; Transliteration: "Danjo 7-nin" (Japanese: 男女7人) | Shigeru Yamazaki | Noboru Kimura | Eiji Yamanaka | August 20, 2002 |
| 8 | "Being Called a Long-time Loser"; Transliteration: "Mannen Yarare to Yobarete" (Japanese: 万年ヤラレと呼ばれて) | Hiroatsu Agata | Seishi Minakami | Hashiru Shimazu | August 27, 2002 |
| 9 | "Who Will Wear the Maid Clothes?"; Transliteration: "Maid Ishou wa Dare ga Kiru" (Japanese: メイド衣装は誰が着る) | Matsuo Asami | Seishi Minakami | Kenji Yasuda | September 3, 2002 |
| 10 | ""Get You" Days"; Transliteration: "Get You Jidai" (Japanese: ゲッチユー時代) | Hirotaka Endou | Noboru Kimura | Hirotaka Endou | September 10, 2002 |
| 11 | "What Happened to Mako?"; Transliteration: "Mako ni Nani ga Okottaka" (Japanese: マコに何が起こったか) | Megumi Yamamoto | Noboru Kimura | Hashiru Shimazu | September 17, 2002 |
| 12 | "Dr. Sanada Doesn't Turn Back"; Transliteration: "Sanada Hakase wa Furimukanai" (Japanese: 真田博士はふり向かない) | Yasuo Ejima | Seishi Minakami | Hashiru Shimazu | September 24, 2002 |
| 13 | "Full Force Strawberries"; Transliteration: "Fuzoroi no Ichigo-tachi" (Japanese: ふぞろいのイチゴたち) | Shinichiro Kimura | Seishi Minakami | Shinichiro Kimura | October 1, 2002 |
| OVA | "Andro White Paper"; Transliteration: "Andro Hakusho" (Japanese: アンドロ白書) | Shinichiro Kimura | Seishi Minakami | Shinichiro Kimura | March 21, 2003 |
