= Cyber Team in Akihabara =

1998 Japanese anime television series

- North American DVD cover

アキハバラ電脳組 (Akihabara Dennō Gumi)
- Genre: Action, comedy, science fiction
- Anime television series
- Directed by: Yoshitaka Fujimoto
- Written by: Katsumi Hasegawa
- Music by: Shinkichi Mitsumune
- Studio: Ashi Productions
- Licensed by: NA: ADV Films (2004–2009)
- Original network: TBS
- English network: US: Anime Network
- Original run: April 4, 1998 – September 26, 1998
- Episodes: 26
- Manga

Cyber Team in Akihabara: PataPi!
- Written by: Tsukasa Kotobuki
- Published by: Kodansha
- Magazine: Nakayoshi
- Published: August 1998
- Video game

Cyber Team in Akihabara: PataPies!
- Developer: Westone
- Publisher: Sega
- Genre: Digital pet, Adventure
- Platform: Dreamcast
- Released: July 29, 1999
- Anime film

Cyber Team in Akihabara: Summer Vacation of 2011
- Directed by: Yoshitaka Fujimoto; Hiroaki Sakurai
- Written by: Katsumi Hasegawa
- Music by: Shinkichi Mitsumune
- Studio: Production I.G; Xebec
- Released: August 14, 1999
- Runtime: 60 minutes

Cyber Team in Akihabara (アキハバラ電脳組, Akihabara Dennō Gumi) is a 1998 Japanese anime television series created by Tsukasa Kotobuki and Satoru Akahori. It aired from April 4, 1998, to September 26, 1998, on TBS and ran for 26 episodes. It was released in the United States by ADV Films and was also broadcast on international networks such as Anime Network (United States), AXN Asia (Singapore, Philippines and Thailand), Locomotion (Mexico, Colombia, Venezuela, Argentina, Spain and Brazil). A 1-hour featured animation film of the series was subsequently released in Japan entitled Cyber Team in Akihabara: Summer Vacation of 2011 (アキハバラ電脳組 2011年の夏休み, Akihabara Dennō Gumi: Nisenjūichinen no Natsu Yasumi); unlike the series the film was produced by Production I.G and Xebec. The show has an array of characters, many of whom are named after birds, gods, and real-myth villains. The conception design was hand drawn. The show followed Magical girls format.

Media format initial was Japanese VHS Vol. 1–7 release on 23 Dec 1998, along with LD. Outside JP, NA region had 2004 volume and a complete DVD collection box released on 2006, by ADV Films. In 2016, announcement made by King Records for a limited Blu-ray box set release, are included all various video benefits, a 48P booklet and Summer Vacation 2011 film which already had VHS and DVD JP physical retail.

== Story ==
Twelve-year-old junior high school student Hibari Hanakoganei lives in Akihabara, a suburb of Tokyo, in the year 2010. The current craze among young girls in Akihabara are electronic pets called "Pata-Pi." Hibari seems to be the only girl in town without one and can only admire the PataPi owned by her best friend, Suzume, whom she has named Francesca.

Late one evening, Hibari sees a hill and recognizes a person standing beside a tree at its peak as "her Prince", who has been appearing to her in her dreams. She runs towards him and he mysteriously vanishes. A glowing sphere descends from the sky and lands on her palms. It materializes into a PataPi. She hugs it and the adventure of Hibari and Densuke the PataPi begins.

Unbeknownst to Hibari, she is under the watchful eye of a shadowy character and is ambushed while walking home from school by strange creatures called Homunculus and a masked woman (Jun). Hibari finds out that they are after Densuke and strives to protect him. When all else fails, Jun calls out a more powerful creature called Cerberus to attack Hibari and take Densuke from her. Out of extreme love for Densuke, Hibari cries out and an intense beam of light descends from the sky onto Densuke. Densuke vanishes and transformed into a woman in a black body suit to which various mecha components materialize and bond to her. Densuke has become the Diva (Aphrodite), who looks remarkably like Hibari. Aphrodite soundly defeats Cerberus while Jun runs away in defeated frustration. Unknown to Hibari, a masked man in black (Takashi a.k.a. Shooting Star) stands at the top of a building, observing every moment of what happened.

Shortly thereafter, Aphrodite vanishes, and Densuke re-appears and falls to the ground as Hibari quickly scoops him up.

The next few episodes focus on unlocking the Diva within the other PataPies. It shows how the three girls get along and form the Cyberteam in Akihabara, aimed at stopping masked women and their Homunculus from terrorising the city of Akihabara.

In subsequent episodes, Kamome and Tsubame are introduced. Washuu is revealed as the founder of a Celtic organization called Rosenkreuz (Rose Cross in German) and he himself is Christian Rosenkreuz, hiding under the name of Washuu Ryuugasaki to carry out his agenda. He once worked for the famous alchemist Paracelsus and collaborated with a French man, Cigogne Raspailles, and a young American man, Crane Bahnsteik to invent a device that can grant immortality (Divas). However, due to their secrecy, none of their inventions is revealed to the world. After Crane discovers that inventions made by the world lead to World Wars and the implications of Divas falling into the hands of warmongers, he ran off to space in his invented space rocket with all the plans on the immortality project.

The owner of the PataPi can fuse with the Diva to form a complete Diva. This is only possible for those who are the chosen Anima Mundi and possess a pure and undefiled heart. Towards the end of the series, only Hibari and Tsubame fuse with their Divas; Hibari beginning in episode 17 and Tsubame during episode 21. In the movie, all five of the girls fuse with their divas just prior to the film's climax in the Primum Mobile space fortress. The fact that Takashi is a clone of Crane, and used by Washu like a puppet to awaken the sleeping Divas in space (kept in Crane's space fortress the Primum Mobile), causes Takashi to rebel and find his identity in the world, with the three women Jun, Miyama and Hatoko joining him.

Towards the end of the series, Kamome's grandfather, Shimabukuro Sengakuji, reveals everything he knows about Rosenkreuz, the concept of Divas, which are artificial forms powered by neutrinos, and the principal Washu, who is the mastermind behind the events. Soon after, Washu discards his pseudo-identity, reverting to the original Christian Rosenkreuz, and changes the school into a large altar to welcome the descent of the Primum Mobile. He finds out that Crane was the one controlling the events that happened and dies soon after of old age due to rapid aging. Then Crane issues an ultimatum to Japan that he seeks the Anima Mundi and will threaten to destroy the country and the world if it is not met. Finally, at the end, the girls rebel and the Divas sacrifice themselves in place of the girls.

At the end of the series, it appears that Takashi survived. He is seen at the end of a speeding train with a small girl who looks exactly like Tsubame. She has a Pata Pi that looks exactly like Petite Ange. He cradles the child in his arms and says, "Come now, my Anima Mundi, we have work to do."

Movie plot:

The plot revolves around the sudden literal uprootment of the region of akihabara, which is caused by the metatron's untrolled activities while he's in the anima mundi satellite. The military couldn't destroy it, so it's up to the four to do so. They suit up, go there, find the problem and neutralize it. then they return to enjoy their remaining summer holiday.

== Cast and characters ==
Hibari Hanakoganei (花小金井 ひばり, Hanakoganei Hibari)
Voiced by: Ryōka Shima (Japanese); Luci Christian (English)
The protagonist. She is a typical girl who is not good in academics, but has a pure and trusting heart. Her Pata-Pi is Densuke (デンスケ), a simplistic winged one whose only word is "Pee!"; it transforms into the Diva Aphrodite. Hibari was Crane Bahnsteik's princess as Crane calls her as his Anima Mundi when he gives Densuke to her during their first meeting. Hibari's name means skylark and her surname is probably derived from the name of the Hanakoganei station in Tokyo. Her younger brother died during childbirth and his name was supposed to be Densuke, hence her great affection for her PataPi.
Suzume Sakurajosui (桜上水 すずめ, Sakurajosui Suzume)
Voiced by: Kozue Yoshizumi (Japanese); Tiffany Grant (English)
Hibari's classmate who is her best friend. She is intelligent, mature, and even comes from a wealthy family. She's quite vain and stuck up and gets jealous of other girls with bigger breasts than hers, like Kamome. Her PataPi is Francesca (フランチェスカ Furanchesuka), one which is an equally intelligent multitasker whom Suzume improves to be "the best"; it transforms into the Diva Hestia. She has three elder sisters Suzumi, Suzuna and Suzuri. Suzume's name literally means sparrow.
Tsugumi Higashijujo (東十条 つぐみ, Higashijūjō Tsugumi)
Voiced by: Yū Asakawa (Japanese); Kira Vincent-Davis (English)
A girl who always fights and argues with Suzume a lot. She has an aggressive attitude, as she has a mixed martial arts and professional wrestling background. But she aspires to be a singing star, just like her idol, Hatoko Daikan'yama. Her Pata-Pi is Tetsuro (テツロー Tetsurō) or Tetsu for short, an equally aggressive one who has built-in microphones, whenever she has the urge to sing, and a camera; it transforms into the Diva Athena. Tsugumi's name literally means thrush.
Kamome Sengakuji (泉岳寺 かもめ, Sengakuji Kamome)
Voiced by: Miki Nagasawa (Japanese); Allison Keith (English)
A girl from Osaka who aspires for money and would do anything for it. She likes to pad her bra to look busty, and wears inflatable bras. Her Pata-Pi is Billiken (ビリケン Biriken), one which is basically a futuristic version of a piggy bank and counting machine; it transforms into the Diva Amphitrite. She lives with her mother and stepfather in Osaka after her biological father died. In the movie, Kamome's role is significantly reduced. Kamome's name literally means sea gull.
Tsubame Otori (大鳥居 つばめ, Ōtorii Tsubame)
Voiced by: Megumi Hayashibara (Japanese); Hilary Haag (English)
A mostly stoic girl with a very distorted view on friendship and no concept of family. Brought up by Cigogne as a special catalyst for the return of the Primum Mobile, she is isolated from society all this while. Hibari befriends her and will eventually break Tsubame's apparent evilness at the end of episode 20. The closing of episode 20 shows that Tsubame is adopted by Hibari's parents as the credits roll over artwork depicting Hinako (Hibari's Mother) in bed caressing Hibari on one side and Tsubame on the other. Her Pata-Pi is Petit-Ange (プティアンジュ Puti-Anju also French for "Little Angel), one which is basically dumb; it transforms into the Diva Erinyes. Tsubame's name literally means barn swallow.
Shimabukuro Sengakuji (泉岳寺 シマ福郎, Sengakuji Shimabukurō)
Voiced by: Kenichi Ogata (old), Nobuo Tobita (young) (Japanese); Vic Mignogna (English)
Kamome's grandfather. Kamome generally learns anything about Pata-Pis from him as he was once a part of Rosenkreuz's secret scientists' society. He is a perverted voyer with a penchant for peeking up girls' skirts and in one episode, attempting to spy on them in the beach changing room. Nonetheless he vigilantly watches out for the girls from afar and genuinely seeks to protect them.
Uzura Kitaurawa (北浦和 うずら, Kitaurawa Uzura)
Voiced by: Chinami Nishimura (Japanese); Cynthia Martinez (English)
A lesbian who admires fellow girls for various reasons. She is madly in love with Hibari for her "slender body." She later falls for Kamome due to her "bust size"(or lack thereof). She has a Pata-Pi named Enoken (エノケン), a dog-like one which can only grow its ears. Uzura's name literally means quail. In the Movie Uzura is featured more prominently.
Jun Goutokuji (豪徳寺じゅん, Gōtokuji Jun)
Voiced by: Chieko Honda (Japanese); Christine Auten (English)
An office lady. She passionately longs for the so-called "Black Prince Shooting Star" and goes out to steal the specially designed PataPis to please him. She calls herself Bloody Falcon when in battle. Cerberus is Jun's personal Avatar and her apostolus is Astaroth.
Miyama Soshigaya (祖師谷 みやま, Soshigaya Miyama)
Voiced by: Sakiko Tamagawa (Japanese); Jessica Boone (English)
A bookish geeky student. She passionately longs for the so-called "Black Prince Shooting Star" and goes out to steal the specially designed PataPis to please him. She calls herself Death Crow when in battle. Skeleton is Miyama's personal Avatar and her apostolus is Asmodeus.
Hatoko Daikanyama (代官山 はとこ, Daikanyama Hatoko)
Voiced by: Yumi Kakazu (Japanese); Monica Rial (English)
A marginally talented singing idol. She passionately longs for the so-called "Black Prince Shooting Star" and goes out to steal the specially designed PataPis to please him. She calls herself Dark Pigeon when in battle. Cockatrice is Hatoko's personal Avatar and her apostolus is Beelzebub. In Episode 23, Hatoko also reveals her real identity to the girls when she sings her famous song much to Tsugumi's horrible shock after knowing that her idol Hatoko and Dark Pigeon are the same person.
Crane Bahnsteik (クレイン・バーンシュタイク, Kurein Bānshutaiku), also known as The White Prince
Voiced by: Kappei Yamaguchi (Japanese); Greg Ayres (English)
Crane is a mysterious youth who gives Densuke to Hibari whom she calls him as her prince. In reality, he is a scientist who thinks ahead of his own time and even defies age (he was born in 1884). He conceptualized and invented the airplane and the rocket ship as a means of space travel even before they were invented in our reality. He once allied himself with Rosenkreuz's secret society and even created a computer with him called Metatron to contact the Anima Mundi. But he broke away when he found out that Rosenkreuz wanted to use Metatron for his own purposes. He currently resides with Metatron inside Primum Mobile, a satellite that has been orbiting Earth even before Sputnik I, living in suspended animation and sending "messages" to people through their dreams. In some episodes, Crane comforts Hibari when she was taunted by her enemies and giving advice to her. But in Episode 24 until the finale, he was revealed to be responsible of awakening the Divas instead of Christian's which leads the former to die of old age due to rapid aging and later attacking the girls when they finally rebel against him only to be surprised when he discover the three Divas that he commanded have human emotions and all the five Divas sacrifice themselves in place of the girls. In the end, he returns the Pata-Pis back to their owners after he thanked Hibari for letting him made love in humanity once more. In the movie, Crane became the main catalyst due to the disturbance in his deep sleep caused by the computers controlled within the Primum Mobile.
Washu Ryugasaki (竜ヶ崎 鷲羽, Ryūgasaki Washū)
Voiced by: Hirotaka Suzuoki (Japanese); John Gremillion (English)
Washu is the shady and mysterious principal who seems to watch over the girls and their Pata-Pis and knows everything about them. Later on, he reveals himself as Christian Rosenkreuz. In Episode 24, Christian dies of old age due to rapid aging while confronting Crane inside Primum Mobile and their confrontation are witnessed by Hibari. Wasshu's name literally means eagle.

Takashi Ryugasaki - Lord Shooting Star

Takashi Ryugasaki (竜ヶ崎 鷹士, Ryūgasaki Takashi), also known as The Black Prince and Shooting Star
Voiced by: Tomokazu Seki (Japanese); Chris Patton (English)
Washu's "son" who turns out to be a clone of Crane. He has a resemblance to him and is admired by Jun, Miyama, and Hatoko to the point that he manipulates their emotions. Jun has a crush on him. Cyclops is Takashi's personal Avatar and his Apostolus is Lucifer. In the end of the anime, Takashi is revealed to be survived and he started to manipulate the girl who calls her his Anima Mundi. Takashi's name literally means hawk.
Cigogne Raspailles (シゴーニュ・ラスパイユ, Shigōnyu Rasupaiyu)
Voiced by: Takurou Kitagawa (Japanese); John Kaiser (English)
An old acquaintance of Rosenkreuz who also knows anything about the Anima Mundi. He acts as Tsubame's "father" who brings her to Tokyo. He was known as Count Saint Germain back in the 17th century when he was serving in the French Royal Palace. In Episode 24, he was thrown a card by Christian Rosenkreuz to turn him into a grotresque Apostolus only to be defeated by Hibari as Aphrodite. In Episode 25 after the death of his old partner Christian, Cigogne leaves back to France while walking in a cane.
Hisho (秘書, Hisho)
Voiced by: Hiromi Tsuru (Japanese); Hilary Haag (English)
Hisho is the secretary to Washu Ryuugasaki. She is fanatically loyal to him and would die for him. She gets the chance to fight the girls by donning a Diva suit made by Washu and commands the Diva army. But in Episode 24, Hisho senses her master was fallen and decides to join him by letting Tsubame as Erinyes slashed her from one of her pink blades as she fell into the edge in explosion as Tsubame witnessed her suicidal actions.

=== PataPi ===
Cute cybernetic toys that are a hit in Japan among schoolgirls, PataPies are miniature robots that can be upgraded by purchasing better components and equipping it with special devices, like the Kame Hame Maki that can tell fortunes from horoscopes. Developed and propagated by Washu, the sole purpose of PataPies is to stimulate brain waves in girls so that they can synchronise with the Divas in the Primum Mobile, but the creator of the PataPi is Crane himself. Six PataPies are featured in the series:

Densuke
Voiced by: Megumi Shintani (Japanese); Luci Christian (English)
A PataPi that is given to Hibari by Crane himself, Densuke (nicknamed Denny) is a very ordinary PataPi whose sole purpose is to learn new things and entertain his companion. Actually, Densuke is more sensitive than the other PataPies, being able to detect Erinyes' descent and other things, making it a special PataPi. Densuke can also fly, but not for long.
Francesca
Voiced by: Yui Horie (Japanese); Tiffany Grant (English)
Full name being Francesca Leopard Classic Renoir Sanhasha the Third Junior (though nicknamed Franny), Francesca is Suzume's favourite PataPi that is equipped with all the latest components available in the market. The remarkable components include a missile turret on the back that can shoot out a flurry of mini-missiles that actually explode on impact! Francesca also has a parachute and a built-in calculator.
Tetsuro
Voiced by: Motoko Kumai (Japanese); Greg Ayres (English)
Tetsuro (nicknamed Tetsu) is Tsugumi's martial arts PataPi. He is a powerful PataPi with considerable strength and agility. Well-versed in punches and kicks (probably picked up during Tsugumi's martial arts lessons in her dojo), Tetsurō is the bodyguard of the PataPi Five. It also has built-in dual microphones and Tsugumi uses them when she starts singing songs of her idol Hatoko.
Billiken
Voiced by: Wasabi Mizuta (Japanese); Allison Keith (English)
Named after the goddess of fortune in Osaka, Billiken is an electronic piggy bank and calculator, mainly for finance. Kamome raised Billiken up such that she inherited her stingy and calculative personality. Billiken is a good salesperson, being able to sell takoyaki proficiently in the movie.
Petit-Ange
Voiced by: Hiromi Tsuru (Japanese); Hilary Haag (English)
Meaning Little Angel, Petit-Ange is an exotic PataPi that is dark red in color and has two wings. As Tsubame's playmate and companion, Petit-Ange is fanatically loyal to her and would protect her in times of danger. Petit-Ange can be a very cute PataPi when she starts sucking heads, or a very violent PataPi, like in episode 13 when she performed an uppercut on the PataPi Kero with her wing.
Enoken
Voiced by: Yui Horie (Japanese); Cynthia Martinez (English)
Enoken is Uzura's PataPi, who looks like a dog with two long flabby ears that can extend to form even longer ears like a rabbit. The scary thing about Enoken is that he appears in weird and unlikely situations and whenever there's Enoken, Uzura may be hiding somewhere nearby. Enoken massages people with his ears. Enoken is named after the famous Japanese comedian Kenichi Enomoto; Enoken was actually his stage name.

== Songs ==
Opening
Birth
Lyricist: Masami Okui / Composer: Masami Okui and Toshirō Yabuki / Arranger: Toshirō Yabuki / Singer: Masami Okui
Ending
Flower of Sun (太陽の花, Taiyō no Hana)
Lyricist: Masami Okui / Composer: Masami Okui / Arranger: Toshirō Yabuki / Singer: Masami Okui
Episodes: 1–19, 21–25
Cynthia - People Who Love (シンシア・愛する人, Shinshia - Ai Suru Hito)
Lyricist: Ritsuko Okazaki / Composer: Ritsuko Okazaki / Arranger: Shinkichi Mitsumune / Singer: Ritsuko Okazaki
Episodes: 20
Insert
Red (朱, Aka)
Lyricist: Masami Okui / Composer: Masami Okui / Arranger: Toshirō Yabuki / Singer: Masami Okui
Episodes: 12, 21
Lets Love, Lets Stick (恋しましょ、 ねばりましょ, Koi Shimasho, Nebari Masho)
Lyricist: Masami Okui / Composer: Masami Okui / Arranger: Toshirō Yabuki / Singer: Yumi Kakazu
Cynthia - People Who Love (シンシア・愛する人, Shinshia - Ai Suru Hito)
Lyricist: Ritsuko Okazaki / Composer: Ritsuko Okazaki / Arranger: Shinkichi Mitsumune / Singer: Ritsuko Okazaki
Episodes: 11
Baby Maybe Love
Lyricist: Yuki Matsura / Composer: Yuki Matsura / Arranger: Yuki Matsura / Singer: Ryōka Shima, Kozue Yoshizumi and Yū Asakawa
Episodes: 16
We Salute You
Lyricist: Mamie D.Lee / Composer: Shinkichi Mitsumune / Arranger: Shinkichi Mitsumune / Singer: Yurie Kokubo
Episodes: 18

== Episodes ==
No.	Title	Original release date
1	"Diva"; Transliteration: "Dīvua" (Japanese: ディーヴァ)	April 4, 1998
Hibari finally gets her pata-pi, which are the trendiest toys of their days. And with that she has to fend of against her 1st bad guys.
2	"Black Meteor"; Transliteration: "Kuroi Ryūsei" (Japanese: 黒い流星)	April 11, 1998
in this episode, hibari's best friend, a narcissistic rich girl, suzume, finally gets her pata pi awakened to fight off another one of jun gotokoji's/blood falcone's assaults.
3	"Homonculus"; Transliteration: "Homunkurusu" (Japanese: ホムンクルス)	April 18, 1998
hibari and suzume get another friend, called tsugumi, who also awakens her pata pi after encountering one of the usual assaults from jun/blood falcone.
4	"Death Crow"; Transliteration: "Desu Kurō" (Japanese: デスクロウ)	April 25, 1998
a new foe in the mix named death crow, actual name miyama, tries to break down the newly bonded of the three with psychological manipulation but gets thwarted again. This time the 3 finally give their trio a name, that is, cyber team in akihabara.
5	"Cockatrice"; Transliteration: "Kokatorisu" (Japanese: コカトリス)	May 2, 1998
This time another new foe, comes in the fore, called dark pigeon, who's actually an idol singer, admired by tsugumi. She plots her own scheme, a fake pata pi competition to destroy or take the trios pata pi's, but gets thwarted anyway.
6	"White Prince"; Transliteration: "Shiroi Ōji" (Japanese: 白い王子)	May 9, 1998
The 3 good girls make curry for the sake of hibari's wish, but that stolen by the three mischievous women, which they get back.
7	"Billiken"; Transliteration: "Biriken" (Japanese: ビリケン)	May 16, 1998
a new character joins the crew of hibari, named kamome, of the money loving nature with the pata pi named billiken.
8	"Five Person Eye..."; Transliteration: "Go Hito Me..." (Japanese: 五人目…)	May 23, 1998
Hibari gets a confession letter from another girl and now has to deal with it.
9	"Hotspring"; Transliteration: "Onsen" (Japanese: 温泉)	May 30, 1998
The villainess trio get together to share their perspective and how they met their boss, shooting star, who's the giving them orders to go after thr girls till now.
10	"Showdown Akihabara"; Transliteration: "Kessen Akihabara" (Japanese: 決戦アキハバラ)	June 6, 1998
This time the villainess trio try harder than ever, necessitating another advanced awakening from the pata pi's of the cybrer team quadruple to win over them and survuve.
11	"Red Shoe"; Transliteration: "Akai Kutsu" (Japanese: 赤い靴)	June 13, 1998
The shooting star figure finally starts making a move on his own, and essentially kidnaps hibari and then puts her in a trance sleep, to get her pata pi. Her friends come to rescue her and don't do much good against the opponent. So, hibari, from the beckoning of the real prince, in her trance state, helps her get awake and join their friends's fight and escape from that place.
12	"Black Diva"; Transliteration: "Kuroi Dīvua" (Japanese: 黒いディーヴァ)	June 20, 1998
Still puzzeld by the last fight, hibari isn't in any mood to talk to her friends. Taking that opportunity, the jun/hatopi/miyama trio try to get the pata pi's of the remaining trio by luring them to a secluded location. They're almost overwhelmed byt the new upgraded hostile weapons, but at the last minute by a mysterious pata pi supposedly from the enigmatic transfer student.
13	"Tsubame"; Transliteration: "Tsubame" (Japanese: つばめ)	June 27, 1998
Tsubame from france, reveals herself including the overly hostile nature of her own pata pi. Hibari desperately wants to make friends with her, so she takes her to a restaurant, where the remaining three spy on her, but again get interrupted by the villainess trio, but this time hibari rightfully intervenes to save her friends.
14	"Day of Light Goes by" Transliteration: "Sari ni Shi Hibi no Hikari" (Japanese: 去りにし日々の光)	July 4, 1998
Back to the fight, where after defeating the trio, tsubame with her black diva, joins in to test the strength of the four divas's in a playful manner, while the principal of hibari's school and tsubame's adoptive parent talk about how they lost crane, the guy hibari knows as the prince of her dreams.
15	"Castle of Sand"; Transliteration: "Suna no Shiro" (Japanese: 砂の城)	July 11, 1998
hibari and the gang take a leisurely day-off at the beach to cool off while their four pata pi's have their own adventure.
16	"Anima Mundi"; Transliteration: "Anima Mundi" (Japanese: アニマ・ムンディ)	July 18, 1998
This episode is about the parent teacher conference and the background the four's familial status. Also, it is known that hibari named pata pi after the brother that was supposed to be born but died because of miscarriage.
17	"Newborn"; Transliteration: "Shinsei" (Japanese: 新生)	July 25, 1998
After being drawn to a hidden dimension and getting to know the true hostile nature of tsubame, hibaeri to fend off the takashi, the crane clone's attcaks, finally merges with her pata pi, defeats tsubame's attacks and undo's the dimensional concealment spell.
18	"Abyss"; Transliteration: "Naraku" (Japanese: 奈落)	August 1, 1998
After takashi gets disowned by the very people that created him as a clone from Crane, he stumbles upon the very people he tried to manipulate, the villainess trio. To whom he reveals his true nature, leading the three to a bar, the time spent wherein turns into a semi-recap segment.
19	"Mask"; Transliteration: "Kamen" (Japanese: 仮面)	August 8, 1998
After master shooting star, leaves his nest, he asks genuinely for a final strike on hiabri's gang, with the help of the villainess trio. They put their all into it and still fail.
20	"Wing Opening Time"; Transliteration: "Hane Hiraku Toki" (Japanese: 羽ひらくとき)	August 15, 1998
While spending quality time with her family, hibari meets tsubame and tsubame becomes slowly but surely clung onto her femily as she never had any to begin with.
21	"Summon"; Transliteration: "Shōkan" (Japanese: 召還)	August 22, 1998
Hibari and tsubame have become like sisterly figures in their family, much to the chagrin of the remaining trio in her friend group. While having an argument, a new troupe of enemies gets summones to their location, fighting which earns tsubame acceptance from hibari's friends. But then the final conflict starts, all 5 of the pata pi gets summoned to a location, toward a meteor that was approaching earth for some time. As it's the coming of metatron.
22	"Vision Once Now"; Transliteration: "Ima Hitotabi no Maboroshi" (Japanese: 今ひとたびの幻)	August 29, 1998
Kamome's grandpa tells them everything after hibari and tsubame in their merged form escape the summoning. They get to know the 2 dudes, the principal and tsubame's adoptive father are actually some 500 year old immortal dudes, from Rosenkreutz, who had aimed to arrange the entirety of akihabara region as an altar make the perfect arrival space for crane/metatron and his setelite (Kamome's grandpa was once part of them, through the space race, so he got to know it all). And also how akihabara five were used to make sure of his arrival. All this happened, all the battles to serve as stimuli, to make the satellite come to them.
23	"Altar City"; Transliteration: "Saidan Toshi" (Japanese: 祭壇都市)	September 5, 1998
After the miliatry fail to intervene because of EMP shield, the five with the charging force of hiabri and tsubame's merged diva's go to find a gap in the shield. But standing in their way is many mass produced homunculi weapons and artificially created diva's. But who to save them in this moment but the villainess trio. With their help, hibari is resolute to reach her prince.
24	"Lost Paradise"; Transliteration: "Shitsu Rakuen" (Japanese: 失楽園)	September 12, 1998
After hibari has entered the satellite ship and braved all the threats, including a desperate rosenkreutz using his fellow, cigone, to defeat hibari, she sees her much precious prince having an argument with the christian guy, about not wanting to rule the world like him, rather being disgusted at the state of the world and wanting to only take hibari and the others, as she's the only one considered worthy.
25	"Departure"; Transliteration: "Tabidachi" (Japanese: 旅立ち)	September 19, 1998
Apparently, the anima mundi satellite wants all five to go with them in the outer space for a small time. Initially the ifve were ok with it, but hibari after seeing the reaction of both her parents, decides with all the other 5 to reject that offer, after all of them becoming of 1 mind. At last, it is seen, that takashi, the clone has supposedly taken one of the testtube gals with him, as he thinks of it as anima mundi.
26	"BIRTH"	September 26, 1998
After assertively giving all their piece to the metatron, god-complex guy, their passionately worded plea awakened the hearts of all their pata pi, who got that anima mundi satellite way out of the orbit of earth, thus saving the five from being taken away. But of course, at the end, that also, moved the prince figure, who gave them back their pata pi's and there was no sacrifice whatsoever.

== Reception ==
THEM anime gave the series three stars out of five. Carlo Santos of Anime News Network gave the first ADV Films DVD volume a D for the original voice acting and art, an F for the English dub voice acting, animation and story and a C− for the music.

Preceded by Anime Ganbare Goemon (10/4/1997 - 3/28/1998)	TBS Saturday 17:00 Timeframe Cyber Team in Akihabara (April 4, 1998 - September 26, 1998)	Succeeded by Sorcerous Stabber Orphen (10/3/1998 - 3/27/1999)
