= Dicot (band) =

- Origin: Japan
- Genres: Pop
- Years active: 2000–2004
- Labels: Sony Music Entertainment Japan

Dicot is a Japanese musical duo. The members, Shino and Kana, both grew up in Fukuoka Prefecture and met at Fukuoka Women's Junior College in 1997 as first-year students. They quickly became good friends, decided to form a musical group, and before long they debuted in 2001 with Sony Music Entertainment Japan.

Dicot announced that they would break up in March 2004 due to creative differences, but the two are still good friends. Perhaps their best known work is their first single, the opening theme for the anime Super GALS! Kotobuki Ran, called "A-I-TSU (ア★イ★ツ)".

== Members ==
- Kana Hayase (はやせ 花奈) - born July 18, 1979. From Fukuoka Prefecture. Since leaving dicot, she has been pursuing a career as a solo artist.
- Shino (しの) - born December 12, 1979. From Fukuoka Prefecture.

== Discography ==
=== Singles ===
- A-I-TSU (ア★イ★ツ) (released 2001.4.25)
1. A-I-TSU (ア★イ★ツ)
2. Era Kokyū (えら呼吸)
3. Haru Ki-iro no Naka de... (春黄色の中で・・・)
4. A-I-TSU (karaoke)
- Hakka Drop (ハッカドロップ) (released 2001.7.4)
1. Hakka Drop (ハッカドロップ)
2. Hakka Drop: Shōrinji Kenpō version (ハッカドロップ -少林寺拳法バージョン-)
3. Shichigatsu Hatsuka no Sora no Shita no Boku no Kimochi: Soshite Oka no Ue no Kirari to Kagayaku Hoshi wo Mite Anata ha Dou Omou Kashira? (7月20日の空の下の僕の気持ち～そして丘の上のキラリと輝く星を見てあなたはどう思うカシラ？～)
4. Hakka Drop (karaoke)
- Hitoribocchi (一人ぽっち) (released 2002.2.27)
1. Hitoribocchi (一人ぽっち)
2. Mutenka no Australopithecus (無添加のアウストラロピテクス)
3. Yowamushi (弱虫)
- Nijūgokaime no Natsu (二十五回目の夏) (released 2002.8.21)
1. Nijūgokaime no Natsu (二十五回目の夏)
2. To Aru Hirusagari (とある昼下がり)
3. Yasuminasai tto... (休みなさいっと・・・)
4. Nijūgokaime no Natsu (karaoke)
- Taiyō ga Kureta Kisetsu (太陽がくれた季節) (released 2004.7.7)
1. Taiyō ga Kureta Kisetsu (太陽がくれた季節)
2. Ano Subarashii Ai wo Mō Ichido (あの素晴らしい愛をもう一度)

=== Albums ===
- Dicot (released 2000.2.15) - indies mini album
1. Dekoboko no Jinsei (凸凹の人生)
2. Hakka (はっか)
3. Ekichō Osusume no Uta (駅長おすすめの唄)
4. Hin (貧)
5. Tamanegi (たまねぎ)
- Asu ni Mukatte Ikimashō (明日に向かっていきましょう) (released 2003.9.10)
1. A-I-TSU: album mix (ア★イ★ツ)
2. Taiyō ga Kureta Kisetsu (太陽がくれた季節)
3. Hitoribocchi (一人ぽっち)
4. I Am Kajū ga 100% (I am 果汁が100%)
5. Hakka Drop (ハッカドロップ)
6. Memeshikute (めめしくて)
7. Asu ni Mukatte Ikimashō (明日に向かっていきましょう)
8. Kenka Jōtō (喧嘩上等)
9. Nijūgokaime no Natsu (二十五回目の夏)
10. Ano Subarashii Ai wo Mō Ichido (あの素晴らしい愛をもう一度)
11. Yoroshiku (よろしく)
12. Saru no Koigokoro -live version- (サルの恋心)

=== Compilations ===
- Girls Style (1) - 21st Century New Power Hen (released 2001.9.19)
  11. A-I-TSU (ア★イ★ツ)
