= Mihona Fujii =

Japanese manga artist

Mihona Fujii 藤井みほな
- Born: November 12, 1974 (age 52) Tokyo
- Area: Manga artist
- Notable works: Gals!

Mihona Fujii (藤井みほな, Fujii Mihona; born November 12, 1974 in Tokyo) is a Japanese shōjo manga artist. She is best known for her manga GALS!, which was published in Ribon magazine, and adapted into an anime television series under the name Super GALS! Kotobuki Ran. Her debut work was Mujaki na mama de, published in the 1990 autumn issue of Ribon Original. In 2006, she created Tokyo Angels which ran in Margaret throughout that year.

In 2019, she revived Gals! on the MangaMee app and confirmed that it is a continuation.

== Works ==
Title	Year	Notes	Refs
Start!	1992	Published by Shueisha under the Ribon Mascot Comics branding, 1 volume	
Spicy Girl (スパイシー★ガール, Supaishī ★ gāru)	1994	Published by Shueisha under the Ribon Mascot Comics branding, 1 volume	
Passion Girls (パッション❤ガールズ, Passhon ❤ gāruzu)	1994–1996	Published by Shueisha under the Ribon Mascot Comics branding, 5 volumes.	
Ryuō Mahōjin (龍王魔法陣, Dragon King Magic)	1996–1997	Published by Shueisha under the Ribon Mascot Comics branding, 3 volumes.	
Yuki no Hanabira (雪の花びら, Snow Petals)	1998	Published by Shueisha under the Ribon Mascot Comics branding, 1 volume	
Himitsu no Hanazono (秘密の花園, Secret Garden)	1998	Published by Shueisha under the Ribon Mascot Comics branding, 1 volume	
Super Princess (すーぱー☆プリンセス, Su ̄ pa ̄ ☆ purinsesu)	1999	Published by Shueisha under the Ribon Mascot Comics branding	
Gals!	1998–2002	Serialized in Ribon magazine Published by Shueisha, 10 volumes	
Tokyo Angels (東京ANGELS, Tōkyō enjeruzu)	2006	Serialized in Margaret; Published by Shueisha, 3 volumes	
Gals!!	2019–2022	Continuation of Gals! Serialized on the MangaMee app published by Shueisha under the Ribon Mascot Comics branding, 4 volumes	
Mihona Fujii's I♡TAKARAZUKA!!! (藤井みほなのI♡TAKARAZUKA!!!, Fujii Mihona no I♡TAKARAZUKA!!!)	2020	Serialized in Monthly Afternoon May 2020 issue published by Kodansha	
