= Gals! =

Japanese manga series

- The first volume of the manga featuring the three main characters - Ran Kotobuki, Miyu Yamazaki and Aya Hoshino.
- Genre: Comedy
- Manga
- Written by: Mihona Fujii
- Published by: Shueisha
- English publisher: NA: CMX (2005–2010); Shueisha (digital)
- Magazine: Ribon
- Original run: December 29, 1998 – May 1, 2002
- Volumes: 10
- Anime television series

Super Gals!
- Directed by: Tsuneo Kobayashi
- Produced by: Tomoko Gushima; Ryunosuke Tsuno
- Written by: Masashi Kubota
- Music by: Masumi Itō
- Studio: Pierrot
- Licensed by: NA: Enoki Films USA; ADV Films (2003–06; sub-licensed); Crunchyroll (2006–present; sub-licensed)
- Original network: TXN (TV Tokyo)
- English network: NA: Anime Network
- Original run: April 1, 2001 – March 31, 2002
- Episodes: 52
- Video game

Super GALS! Kotobuki Ran
- Developer: Konami
- Publisher: Konami
- Platform: Game Boy Color
- Released: July 26, 2001
- Video game

Super GALS! Kotobuki Ran 2 ~Miracle -> Getting~
- Developer: Konami
- Publisher: Konami
- Genre: Puzzle
- Platform: Game Boy Color
- Released: February 7, 2002
- Video game

Super GALS! Kotobuki Ran Special -> Coolmen Get you Gals Party ->
- Developer: Konami
- Publisher: Konami
- Genre: Party
- Platform: PlayStation
- Released: August 8, 2002
- icon

Gals! is a manga series written and illustrated by Mihona Fujii. It was published by Shueisha and serialized in Ribon shōjo manga magazine from 1998 to 2002. The manga was also published in the U.S. by CMX. In 2019, Mihona Fujii announced that the series will continue from November 5 on Shueisha's Manga Mee app, taking off from the manga's ending. In 2026, the series became licensed digitally in English on Shueisha's Manga Million platform.

An anime television series adaptation produced by Studio Pierrot titled Super Gals! Kotobuki Ran (超ギャルズ！寿蘭, Sūpā Gyaruzu! Kotobuki Ran) aired in Japan on TV Tokyo between April 1, 2001, and March 31, 2002, running a length of 52 episodes. The first 26 episodes had been licensed and dubbed for North American distribution by ADV Films under the name Super Gals! and was distributed on DVD from 2003 to 2004. The Right Stuf International announced at Anime Expo 2006 that they had licensed all the episodes, including 27-52 and released a subtitled boxset containing the remaining 26 episodes on January 16, 2007. A box set containing all 52 episodes was also released in 2010.

== Plot ==
The series revolves around the kogal (generally known as gyaru, or "gal") subculture in Japan. The title character, Ran Kotobuki is the self-proclaimed "world's greatest gal". As a teenager in Shibuya, she is determined to live out the gal lifestyle for the rest of her life, and she has gained a reputation as the most respected gal in all of Shibuya. However, she comes from a family of police officers—her grandparents, her parents, and her older brother are all officers, and her younger sister is set on following in their footsteps. Ran has other dreams for her future, but as frequently shown, she has acquired the family's sense of justice and spirit. Her two friends, Miyu and Aya, also have their own problems and circumstances.

The sequel manga follows the original manga's ending storyline. Ran, Miyu, Aya, and their friends still hang out in Shibuya after they graduate. Ran is still deciding on her career, and Miyu is now part of Kotobuki family after she marries Yamato. Miyu decides to search for her missing mother along with her friends, Yamato and his family, so she can tell her that Miyu will always love her and showing her new life. Aya is now a university student alongside Rei as they attend the same campus.

== Characters ==
The first nine volumes of the CMX translation have the family name first.

=== Main ===
Ran Kotobuki (寿 蘭, Kotobuki Ran)
Voiced by: Megumi Toyoguchi (Japanese); Luci Christian (English)
Ran Kotobuki is a strong-willed, athletic, and attractive gal with orange hair with a red streak who rules the streets of Shibuya. Although she comes from a long line of police officers, she is ditzy and absent-minded when it comes to school and the only subject she gets good grades on is physical education and her poorest subjects are mathematics and literature. When she was in elementary school, she was enthusiastic about becoming a police officer, but quit the ambition after learning that she won't be able to dye her hair or wear her favorite accessories. She is usually obsessed with anything that is trendy or catches her eye, usually brown-nosing guys who find her cute to buy them, and is also quite gluttonous, but inside her heart, she has a strong sense of justice that runs in her blood and is extremely intimidating and tough when she's in combat mode. She is a role model to the junior students at Hounan High for her social status as a magnificent gal for justice and her very understanding nature for teens who are learning to cope, but some look upon her with jealousy and anger. Despite being an underachiever, Ran is smart and has a good memory on what she is interested in (such as shopping). There is a running gag in the manga that some of her friends say that if only she used that (memory, concentration, etc.) on studying, she'd get somewhere in life. She also has a foreign friend, Vivian Lin, a Taiwanese celebrity who looks amazingly like her, whom she met during a school trip to Taiwan (only shown in two stories of the manga). Ran wishes that she has soft hair, but according to Rui Otahata, Rei Otohata's cousin, her hair is damaged and dry due to the amount of bleach she pours on it. Her favorite color of her silhouette is red.
Miyu Yamazaki (山咲 美由, Yamazaki Miyu)
Voiced by: Haruna Ikezawa (Japanese); Kira Vincent-Davis (English)
Miyu is an independent, headstrong, and kind-hearted classmate with blonde hair with an orange ombre of Ran and one of her closest friends. However, behind her romantic and cute cover lies a dark past. When she was in third grade, her parents divorced (her father is currently remarried) and she lived with her mother, who paid more attention to looking for a new man rather than to see Miyu grow up (she despised Miyu because she reminded her of her divorced husband). She once was the leader of a street gang called the "Resistance", often wreaking mayhem and irritation during middle school and had a rough-mannered and threatening personality that Ran despised. One day, Yamato (by then a rookie cop) saved her from a tough situation, and his dedication to helping with Miyu's problems made her fall in love with him. Because of that, she left the life of crime and became more polite after Yamato told her his wish for her to be good and eventually became great friends with Ran. However, she remains an incredible fighter and can get back to her previous violent self when someone completely upsets her and when she becomes uncharacteristically furious. In conversation, she has a habit of referring to herself in the third person, though occasionally uses first person in more serious situations. Ran often remarks how Miyu is "lovey-dovey" with Yamato and there is a running gag on both series when they are interrupted when they are trying to kiss, usually by Ran. When her mom eventually moved out, she moved into a new apartment and married Yamato in Hawaii in the manga. Her favorite color of her silhouette is yellow.
Aya Hoshino (星野 綾, Hoshino Aya)
Voiced by: Oma Ichimura (Japanese); Kim Prause (English)
Aya is one of the top students with black hair in Ran's class, but she was secretly doing enjo kōsai to earn money according to the first chapter/episode, since her parents were very strict about her being in number one in academics and wouldn't let her do any part-time jobs or go out. Ran found out and confronted her about it, fortunately making her realize that she was doing the wrong thing before Aya could actually "do it" with somebody. Since then, Aya became good friends with Ran and Miyu. She is a shy but honest and studious individual who enjoys academics while also longing for excitement every now and then, which is thankfully provided by Ran. Aya strengthens and changes during course of the series. She's usually a crybaby when it comes to sad or happy moments, but she grows braver and learns to stand on her own. She has deep feelings for Rei Otohata but her shyness leads to complications in their relationship, especially as Otohata initially dates her due to pity rather than affection, but the two eventually manage to establish a genuine relationship by the end of the series. Her favorite color of her silhouette is blue.
Rei Otohata (乙幡 麗, Otohata Rei)
Voiced by: Hiroshi Kamiya (Japanese); Chris Patton (English)
Rei Otohata is a student at Meisho Daichi High School (Champion High School in ADV's dub). He is also known as "#1", because he was featured in a magazine as being the coolest and handsomest teenage guy in the area. He rides a motorcycle and is good friends with Yuya. He has a cold and detached demeanor, and is constantly annoyed by Ran. He has trouble expressing his feelings towards others. He initially likes Ran but tends to hide this well, but later reciprocates Aya's feelings for him by the end of the series.
Yuya Aso (麻生 裕也, Asō Yūya)
Voiced by: Kenichi Suzumura (Japanese); Greg Ayres (English)
Yuya is also a student at Meisho Daichi High School, and he is known as "#2" or "Second Place", as he was the runner-up to Rei in a popularity magazine poll. He and Rei are friends. Early in the series, he develops a crush on Ran, even role-playing how it would be nice to date her, but Ran is oblivious to the fact. The crush gets worse when Tatsuki joins in and confesses successfully to Ran. As time passes, he helps Mami Honda out to the point that Mami starts falling for him, even though he still has a crush on Ran. Near the end of the series, he gets over Ran, and ends up dating Mami.
Tatsuki Kuroi (黒井 直樹, Kuroi Tatsuki)
Voiced by: Yukimasa Obi (Japanese); Jason Douglas (English)
Tatsuki Kuroi (also nicknamed Tatsukichi) is a wild and kind student at Machida West High School, and he calls himself "the parapara king of Machida" (also known as "Machida Black", since the "kuro" in his last name means "black"). In the manga he is also called Blackwell (the literal translation of his surname). He is often nicknamed "Monkey Boy" since his personality is very similar to that of a monkey. He becomes Ran's boyfriend, although she studiously avoids anything remotely approaching intimacy other than hugging or holding hands, thus calming him. He likes to use English words and phrases in his conversations. Sometimes he says a phrase in English then he will say then same phrase in Japanese, or he will say a phrase beginning in Japanese and ending in English, and then he will say the same phrase again, switching the Japanese and English parts (example: "Black nichiyōbi", "Black Sunday", and then "Kuroi Sunday"). He also likes to call Yuya "brother" in English.

=== Supporting ===
Yamato Kotobuki (寿 大和, Kotobuki Yamato)
Voiced by: Hiroki Takahashi (Japanese); Paul Locklear (English)
Ran's and Sayo's older brother. Unlike Ran, he has a sensitive and passionate personality that shows through his job as a cop, and is usually on duty at the Shibuya "koban". The only thing that annoys him is when Ran causes trouble in Shibuya and he has to bring her to the police station. His love interest is Ran's best friend, the much-younger Miyu Yamazaki, whom he first met when he was a rookie cop and when Miyu was a troublesome and violent gangster. It was he that helped her to be good, since he was the only one who believed in her. In the end, he helped Miyu move into her new apartment and married her after she finished high school.
Sayo Kotobuki (寿 沙夜, Kotobuki Sayo)
Voiced by: Rie Kugimiya (Japanese); Hilary Haag (English)
Ran's and Yamato's younger sister. She dreams of being a detective like her father has. Sayo and her boyfriend, Masato Iwai, often roleplay as conspicuous detectives, drawing the attention of onlookers and inciting frustration from Ran who is bothered by their antics. She is very energetic and enthusiastic about everything she does, but she is slightly accident prone and often falls face down when she tries to run away or exit in a dramatic fashion. She ends her sentences with the phrase "You bet" (だっちゅ, Datchu). In the end of the series she is still with Masato and they both go the same high school that Ran goes to.
Taizo Kotobuki (寿 泰三, Kotobuki Taizō)
Voiced by: Ginzō Matsuo (episodes 1–24), Fumihiko Tachiki (episodes 25–52) (Japanese); John Gremillion (English)
Ran's father is the local Chief of Detectives. He disapproves of his daughter's lifestyle. He tries his best to make Ran say that she wants to be a police officer, and often tries various tactics to get her to do various jobs helping the people (like refusing to giving her money). He is also famous for employing a technique called "Taizo's Giant Swing of Fury" on Ran when he loses patience with her and once on Sayo.
Kiyoka Kotobuki (寿 清香, Kotobuki Kiyoka)
Voiced by: Yuko Kobayashi (Japanese); Christine Auten (English)
Ran's mother who is also a police officer. It is a running gag throughout the series about her mysterious age, as she appears to be much younger than her husband. She is much more patient with Ran and the entire family in general- she never seems upset by Ran's choice to be a Gal as is very supportive of her children. Towards the end of the manga, she tells Miyu that she considers Miyu her daughter, showing just how nurturing she can be.
Mami Honda (本多 マミ, Honda Mami)
Voiced by: Aya Ishizu (Japanese); Allison Sumrall (English)
Mami is a gal from the neighboring Ikebukuro district where she is known as the "Queen of Ikebukuro". She has a fierce rivalry with Ran and participates in several competitions with her. She develops feelings for Yuya after he comforts her during some of the matches. She later forms a truce with Ran. In the anime, she comes from a very rich family.
Harue Kudou (工藤 ハルエ, Kudō Harue)
Voiced by: Reiko Takagi (Japanese); Cynthia Martinez (English)
Harue is Mami's best friend. She was once a member of a gang called the "Eagles", which was broken up by Miyu's "Resistance" gang. She once sent in a nasty email to everyone in school about Miyu and her past.
Masato Iwai (祝 匡人, Iwai Masato)
Voiced by: Kouki Miyata (Japanese); Clint Bickham (English)
Masato is Sayo's boyfriend since the beginning of junior high. He fell in love with her as "the cute girl who always wore a hat" (which she only wore because she cut her bangs too short). From then on, they were a steady couple. He's a bit fun-loving and kind of weird like Sayo and imitates as a junior cop with her, but very just and gallant, especially to Sayo. At the end of the series, he goes to the same high school as Sayo, and they are still a couple.
Naoki Kuroi (黒井 直樹, Kuroi Naoki)
Voiced by: Daisuke Sakaguchi
Naoki Kuroi is Tatsuki's little brother. He's a street-smart, outgoing, but good-hearted boy who, like his brother, thinks of himself as a ladies man, but ends up having crushes on every girl he meets, including Ran, Miyu, Aya, Sayo, and, at the end of the TV series, he has a crush on Kasumi. He enjoys riding a skateboard. He works at their father's ramen shop every now and then, and someday wants to run the business. At first Naoki is upset that Tatsuki does not want to take over the family business, but Tatsuki tells Naoki that he wants to do what he wants.
Nakanishi (中西, Nakanishi)
Voiced by: Ryu Manatsu (Japanese); John Swasey (English)
Ran's teacher. He is very annoyed whenever Ran arrives late or comes up with a pathetic excuse for not having her homework. He is called "Naka-Teach" by Ran. Nakanishi tries to help Ran to do better in school by making her go to his after school classes and always has to scold her.
Satsuki Iida (飯田 さつき, Īda Satsuki) and Rie Aihara (相原りえ, Aihara Rie)
Satsuki Voiced by: Miyuki Yamasaki (Japanese); Cynthia Ann Feaster (English)
Rie Voiced by: Ryōka Shima (Japanese); Jessica Boone (English)
Satsuki and Rie are Ran's schoolmates since elementary school. Satsuki has blonde hair in a short ponytail, and Rie has black hair.
Ganguro Trio (ガングロ·トリオ, Ganguro Torio)
Red Voiced by: Yukiko Tamaki (Japanese); Kaytha Coker (English)
Yellow Voiced by: Shunrin (Japanese); Shondra Marie (English)
Blue Voiced by: Miyuki Yamasaki (Japanese); Nora Stein (English, episodes 1–-18), Elena Coates (English, episodes 19–26) (English)
The three ganguro girls who enjoy bugging Ran. They are identified by the colors red, yellow, blue. They spend much of their time in "sun-salos".
Kazuki Katase (片瀬 一樹, Katase Kazuki)
Voiced by: Akimitsu Takase
Kazuki is a boy who befriends Aya. He acts nice to Aya but disapproves of her hanging around non-academic friends. He becomes angry at Rei for the way he treats Aya, and confesses to Aya.

=== Anime-only ===
Maki Komine (月野 霞, Komine Maki)
Voiced by: Yuko Sasamoto (Japanese); Jessica Boone (English)
A country girl who wants to be Ran's disciple.
Kasumi Tsukino (月野 霞, Tsukino Kasumi)
Voiced by: Yuko Sasamoto
Kasumi is a glasses girl whose dream is to be the number one gal in Shibuya and overthrow Ran. Her reason for becoming a gal is because, when she was younger, she was picked on by some guys. A gal (who appears to have been Towa) saves her from being bullied. She and Ran have a strong rivalry and she tries her hardest to do something that would cause Ran to lose her title as number 1. This usually involves using a disguise. However all of her plans against Ran usually fail, and either she says who she is, or Ran and her friends figure out her disguise. She also finds out Ran's secret from Towa, although it's never revealed what Ran's secret is. She also has a strong sense of right, when needed. When she and Ran were trying to save up enough money to buy a jacket that each of them want badly, Kasumi sells items at a flea market in order to raise money, but when a boy wants a refund for a toy that does not work, she gives back the money to the boy. In the end she goes to the same high school as Ran, and Naoki falls for her when she tells him not to cry.
Towa Himejima (姫島 永久, Himejima Towa)
Voiced by: Eri Saito
Towa is a young woman who runs the Palm Tree Cafe. She is friends with Yamato and the actor who plays Detective Kudoh. She has known Ran since Ran was just a little girl, and they used to play together. Towa was one of the first gals in Shibuya, and was the number one gal back in the day, before Towa passed the title to Ran. She overreacts at times, and when Ran upsets her, she says that she will tell her friends her secret (which is never revealed). She also has a black belt in Karate, and is also kind hearted. When Miyu needs a place to stay, she lives in the empty room at the Palm Tree Cafe. At the end of the series she gives the manager job to the actor who plays "Detective Kudoh", as she quits her job.
Minigal Tan and Minigal White
Minigal Tan Voiced by: Ryōka Shima (Japanese); Serena Varghese (English)
Minigal White Voiced by: Shunrin (Japanese); Jessica Boone (English)
These chibi gals introduce the various gal-terminology throughout the series.

== Chapters ==
Original

No.	Original release date	Original ISBN	English release date	English ISBN
1	August 6, 1999	978-4-08-856158-5	April 1, 2005	978-1-40-120550-8
Chapter 1: "The Greatest Kogal in the World" (コギャルは天下のまわりもの, Kogyaru wa Tenka no Mawari Mono) (December 29, 1998); Chapter 2: "Even Part Time Jobs Cause Body Stress!" (体張りますバイトでも！, Karada Hari Masu Baito Demo!) (February 3, 1999); Chapter 3: "A Girl's Feelings and a Red Mesh" (女心と赤メッシュ, Onna Gokoro to Aka Messhu) (March 3, 1999); Chapter 4: "Is Luck with Guys Here or is it not!?" (あるのかないのか男運！？, Aru no ka Nai no ka Otoko Un!?) (April 3, 1999); Extra chapter: "The Fierce Junior Miyu is Rough SP!" (中坊美由ガンガン荒れてますSP！, Nakabō Miyu Gangan Arete Masu SP!) (May 18, 1999)
2	January 14, 2000	978-4-08-856185-1	June 1, 2005	978-1-40-120551-5
Chapter 5: "It is the Kogal's Way of Life!" (それがコギャルの生きる道！, Sore ga Kogyaru no Ikiru Michi!) (April 30, 1999); Chapter 6: "The Kogals in Shibuya are Number 1!?" (コギャルは渋谷がナンバー1！？, Kogyaru wa Shibuya ga Nanbā Wan!?) (June 3, 1999); Chapter 7: "The Passport of a Kogal in Love" (恋するコギャルのパスポート, Koisuru Kogyaru no Pasupōto) (July 3, 1999); Chapter 8: "Dance! Odaiba's Great Dragnet!!" (踊る！お台場大捜査線！！, Odoru! Odaiba Dai Sōsa-sen!!) (August 3, 1999); Extra chapter: "Sayo and Masato's Exciting Independent Project SP" (沙夜と匡斗のドキドキ自由研究SP, Sayo to Masato no Dokidoki Jiyukenkyū SP) (August 18, 1999)
3	May 15, 2000	978-4-08-856204-9	September 1, 2005	978-1-40-120552-2
Chapter 9: "Ironclad Rule for Gals! Open and Courage!!" (ギャルの鉄則！度胸とホンネ！！, Gyaru no Tessoku! Dokyō to Honne!!) (September 3, 1999); Chapter 10: "Is Searching for a Handsome Man Not Easy!?" (イケメン探しも楽じゃない！？, Ikemen Sagashi mo Raku ja Nai!?) (October 2, 1999); Chapter 11: "" (うちらのパワーはハンパなーい！, Uchi-ra no Pawā wa Hanpa Naī!) (November 2, 1999); Chapter 12: "Hot! DE Christmas!!" (アーチーチー！DEクリスマス！！, Āchīchī! DE Kurisumasu!!) (December 1, 1999); Extra chapter: "Sayo and Masato's Suspenseful Science Investigation SP" (紗夜と匡斗のハラハラ科学捜査SP, Sayo to Masato no Harahara Kagaku Sōsa SP) (December 18, 1999)
4	October 13, 2000	978-4-08-856231-5	November 1, 2005	978-1-40-120553-9
Chapter 13: "Love and Snowboard and Revenge and" (恋とスノボとリベンジと, Koi to Sunobo to Ribenji to) (December 28, 1999); Chapter 14: "SWEET 16 BLUE" (February 3, 2000); Chapter 15: "Going to See Miracle Ran C Today!?" (ミラクル蘭C今日も行く！？, Mirakuru Ran C Kyō mo Iku!?) (March 3, 2000); Extra chapter: "The Junior Detectives Perpetuate a Bang of Justice SP!!" (中坊刑事ゴンゴン正義を貫き通しちゃいますSP！！, Nakabō Keiji Gongon Seigi wo Tsuranukitō Shichai Masu SP!!) (March 18, 2000)
5	January 15, 2001	978-4-08-856251-3	February 22, 2006	978-1-40-120554-6
Chapter 16: "Ran-pyon's First Spring Storm Charisma!!" (カリスマ蘭ぴょん春一番！！, Karisuma Ran-pyon Haru Ichiban!!) (April 3, 2000); Chapter 17: "Tatsukichi Flies in the Sky!!" (タツキチ空を飛ぶ！！, Tatsukichi Sora wo Tobu!!) (May 2, 2000); Chapter 18: "Gals Always Mambo and Samba!!" (ギャルはいつでもマンボでサンバ！！, Gyaru wa Itsudemo Manbo de Sanba!!) (June 3, 2000); Chapter 19: "Summer x 3!! Desperately Getting One Handsome Man!!!" (夏x3！！イケメンゲッチュは命がけ！！！, Natsu x 3!! Ikemen Getchu wa Inochi Gake!!!) (July 3, 2000); Extra chapter: "Taizo's Ran Police Training Project SP" (泰三's蘭の警官養成プログラムSP, Taizōsu Ran no Keikan Yōsei Puroguramu SP) (August 18, 2000)
6	May 15, 2001	978-4-08-856281-0	May 1, 2006	978-1-40-120844-8
Chapter 20: "Playing with Life!! Summer Girl!!" (遊ぶのイノチ！！夏オンナ！！, Asobu no Inochi!! Natsu Onna!!) (August 3, 2000); Chapter 21: "GALS Manners - Two Breaking up - Two in Love!?" (GALS的★愛する2人・別れる2人！？, Gyaruzu Teki - Aisuru Futari - Wakareru Futari!?) (September 2, 2000); Chapter 22: "Autumn Pattern of Hearts in Love" (恋するココロの秋模様, Koisuru Kokoro no Aki Moyō) (October 3, 2000); Chapter 23: "Unified Gals - Solidified Stone!!" (ギャルの結束 石より固し！！, Gyaru no Kessoku - Seki Yori Katashi!!) (November 2, 2000); Chapter 24: "Funky Monky X'Mas!!" (December 1, 2000)
7	October 15, 2001	978-4-08-856318-3	August 23, 2006	978-1-40-120845-5
Chapter 25: "The Gals Rare Taiwan Trip!!" (ギャルズ台湾珍道中！！, Gyaruzu Taiwan Chin Dōchū!!) (December 28, 2000); Chapter 26: "Valentine'S Battle!!" (バレンタイン'S バトル！！, Barentain'S Batoru!!) (February 3, 2001); Chapter 27: "Teacher Nananishi, Tears of Struggle!" (教師中西、涙の奮闘記！, Kyōshi Nakanishi, Namida no Funtō-ki!) (March 3, 2001); Extra chapter: "End of the Century! Gals Summit Showdown!? SP" (世紀末！ギャルズ頂上決戦！？SP, Seikimatsu! Gyaruzu Chōjō Kessen!? SP) (December 18, 2000); Extra chapter: "Absolutely Invincible!? The Charisma Pink Panther X SP!!" (絶対無敵！？ザ・カリスマ・ピンクパンサーXSP！！, Zettai Muteki!? Za Karisuma Pinku Pansā X SP!!) (August 18, 2001); Extra chapter: "Assault Af-Reco Report" (突撃アフレコレポート, Totsugeki Afu-Reko Repōto) (August 18, 2001)
8	January 15, 2002	978-4-08-856341-1	November 22, 2006	978-1-40-120846-2
Chapter 28: ""Ne->Glected Life!" Syndrome" (「ケ→タイ命！」シンドローム, "Ke->Tai Inochi!" Shindorōmu) (April 3, 2001); Chapter 29: "Ran's Style Impossible Style!? Carnation Girl." (蘭的ムリ的！？カーネーション娘。, Ran Teki Muri Teki!? Kānēshon Musume.) (May 1, 2001); Chapter 30: "POST a Love Letter with Great Desire" (恋文POSTに想いを込めて, Koi Bumi POST ni Omoi wo Komete) (June 2, 2001); Chapter 31: "CROSS ROAD" (July 3, 2001)
9	March 15, 2002	978-4-08-856358-9	February 21, 2007	978-1-40-120847-9
Chapter 32: "Summer Open Parasol Open The Monkey Fully Opened the Pedal on the Way!!" (トコナツ全開パラソル全開ついでにおサルはペダルを全開！！, Tokonatsu Zenkai Parasoru Zenkai Tsuide ni wo Saru wa Pedaru wo Zenkai!!) (August 3, 2001); Chapter 33: "Gal Shrine Mission!? Dancing Gal Festival!!" (ギャルで神輿で大決戦！？♪ダンシ～ングギャル祭！！, Gyaru de Mikoshi de Daisakusen!? Danshingu Gyaru Sai!) (September 3, 2001); Chapter 34: "Taizo & Nakanishi, Suicide Spinning Mission!" (泰三＆中西、決死のグルグル大作戦！, Taizō & Nakanishi, Kesshi no Guruguru Daisakusen!) (October 3, 2001); Chapter 35: "Ran Kotobuki, 1 Shot Art Over Life!!" (寿蘭、1発芸に命をかけて！！, Kotobuki Ran, Ippatsu Gei ni Inochi wo Kakete!!) (November 2, 2001); Chapter 36: "Heart Shape" (ココロのカタチ, Kokoro no Katachi) (December 1, 2001)
10	July 15, 2002	978-4-08-856387-9	April 25, 2007	978-1-40-120848-6
Chapter 37: "Promise" (約束, Yakusoku) (December 28, 2001); Chapter 38: "to You Only" (君だけを, Kimi Dake wo) (February 2, 2002); Chapter 39: "FOREVER FRIENDS!☆FOREVER GALS!!" (March 2, 2002); Chapter 40: "It's the Final Chapter!! Everyone Gathers!!!" (最終回ダヨ！！全員集合！！！, Saishūkai da yo!! Zenin Shūgō!!!) (April 2, 2002); Extra chapter: "Black Panther Z Fire Counterattack SP!!" (ブラックパンサーZ炎の逆襲SP！！, Burakku Pansā Z Honō no Gyakushū SP!!) (January 18, 2002); Extra chapter: "Naokichi Destiny Saga" (ナオキチディスティニー編, Naokichi Disutinī Hen) (May 1, 2002)

Reprint

No.	Japanese release date	Japanese ISBN
1	May 15, 2009	978-4-08-618881-4
2	May 15, 2009	978-4-08-618882-1

== Theme songs ==
- Opening
1. "H-i-m" (ア☆イ☆ツ, A-i-tsu)
  - Lyricist: Kana / Composer: Kana / Arranger: Akio Noyama / Singers: dicot
- Ending
1. "I Want a Hug" (抱きしめたい, Dakishimetai)
  - Lyricist: Ikuno Takagi / Composer: Isao Yoshida / Arranger: Isao Yoshida / Singers: Jungle Smile

== Episode list ==
Episodes are numbered as streets, such as "1st street", "2nd street", and so forth. They are also stylized with heart symbols and right arrows. the English titles are generally from the RightStuf version.

=== Season 1 ===
No.	Title	Original release date
1	"The World's Greatest Gal <3 Go Go -> Ran Kotobuki"; Transliteration: "Tenka no Gyaru <3 Ike Ike -> Kotobuki Ran" (Japanese: 天下のギャル♥イケイケ→寿蘭)	April 1, 2001
Ran Kotobuki and her friend, Miyu Yamazaki spend most of their waking hours in the district of Shibuya, where they encounter Rei Otohata and Yuya Asou, the first and second place winners of the Super High School Student Grand Prix. Ran also meets Aya Hoshino, an academically strong classmate, but it is rumored that she has been involved in Enjo kosai.
2	"Shibuya <3 Thrilling -> Great Dragnet"; Transliteration: "Shibuya <3 Harahara -> Dai Sōsa-sen" (Japanese: 渋谷♥ハラハラ→大捜査線)	April 8, 2001
Ran's family is full of cops, yet she refuses to take on a blue suit, or walk a road her parents paved for her. But, when the question of righting ten wrongs for 500 yen comes up...how can she refuse? Ran is ready and willing to catch a purse snatched, who happens to use Ran for more than she knows. Now Ran is being interrogated by cops, for someone is phone hunting, using her name.
3	"A Girl's Feelings <3 Heart Pounding -> Red Mesh"; Transliteration: "Onna Gokoro <3 Doki Doki -> Aka Messhu" (Japanese: オンナゴコロ♥ドキドキ→赤メッシュ)	April 15, 2001
Just as Miyu is considering getting a red mesh for her dear Yamato Kotobuki, mysterious love notes begin popping up in Miyu's desk. When she finally comes face to face with her admirer, now revealed to be Kenji Yoshida, he is not exactly what she was expecting. Rough, and slightly demanding with Miyu, she can only be happy that Ran was there to save her. But the real question is...does Yamato love Miyu as a man or as a cop?
4	"Have It? <3 Don't Have It? -> Luck With Guys?"; Transliteration: "Aruaru? <3 Nainai? -> Otoko Un?" (Japanese: アルアル？♥ナイナイ？→おとこ運？)	April 22, 2001
Ran is down and depressed with the lack of decent GL (good looking) guys in Shibuya. To make matters worse, her luck with guys appears to be 5%. She wants to prove that she just doesn't pick up losers and jerks. So when a new guy appears, who Ran calls 'Michi', becomes interested in and constantly flatters Ran, how can she resist? But, does Mitchy really like Ran...or is his love a lie?
5	"Heart <3 In Pieces -> Is It Over With Aya!?"; Transliteration: "Hāto <3 Bara Bara -> Aya to Zekkō!?" (Japanese: ハート♥バラバラ→綾と絶交！？)	April 29, 2001
Aya is having a great time being friends with Ran and Miyu, until her grades take a nosedrive on a exam. She then decides she no longer wants to be friends, but ends up getting fed up with herself and the mistakes she is making. Meanwhile, two girls from Ikebukuro, the infamous Mami Honda, and her sidekick, Harue Kudo, are taking over Shibuya! Can Ran convince Aya to come back and fight off her new rivals?
6	"Pool <3 Exciting -> Junior Detectives!"; Transliteration: "Pūru <3 Wakuwaku -> Chiyūbō Keiji!" (Japanese: プール♥ワクワク→チユーボー刑事！)	May 6, 2001
Mami wants revenge on Ran, and Yuya is thinking of a way to get Ran to be his girlfriend. When Ran invites him to the pool, he jumps at the chance, dragging Rei with him. Just when all seems well and good, Ran's little sister Sayo and her boyfriend Masato appear on the scene. They are both eager to become police detectives. Mami and Harue jump at the chance to take over Shibuya while everyone is away.
7	"Black Shadow <3 Creeping Up -> Targeted Miyu"; Transliteration: "Kuroi Kage <3 Hita Hita -> Nerawareta Miyu" (Japanese: 黒い影♥ヒタヒタ→狙われた美由)	May 13, 2001
Miyu receives harassing messages at school and on her cellphone as she struggles with shaking her past as a gang leader of the Resistance.
8	"Heart <3 Tingling -> Miyu's Past"; Transliteration: "Kokoro <3 Chikuchiku -> Miyu no Kako" (Japanese: ココロ♥チクチク→美由の過去)	May 20, 2001
Miyu confronts some guys in the park who represented her old rival gang the Eagles, and with the help of Ran, discovers the culprit who threatened her - Harue Kudou, former leader of the eagles gang.
9	"Memories <3 Tearful -> Sayo's Been Kidnapped?"; Transliteration: "Omoide <3 Boroboro -> Sayo ga Yūkai?" (Japanese: 想い出♥ボロボロ→沙夜が誘拐？)	May 27, 2001
Sayo gets to tag along with her brother Yamato as part of her homework project when they come across a robbery suspect. When Sayo learns of the man's motives, she and Junior Detective boyfriend Masato set up a scheme where he gets a chance to contact his daughter. But Ran and the gang aren't clued in on the plan and think Sayo and Masato have been abducted by this older man.
10	"Yuya <3 Nervous -> A Rival Appears!"; Transliteration: "Yūya <3 Sowasowa -> Raibaru Tōjō!" (Japanese: 裕也♥ソワソワ→ライバル登場！)	June 3, 2001
Ran meets Tatsuki Kuroi, an expert para-para dancer, and rumors go around that the two are in a relationship. Yuya is not happy when he discovers this...
11	"Crossing Shibuya <3 Fun-Fun -> Grand Prix"; Transliteration: "Shibuya Ōdan <3 Chiki-Chiki -> Guran Puri" (Japanese: 渋谷横断♥チキチキ→グランプリ)	June 10, 2001
Ran and co. hold a grand prix to determine Ran's boyfriend.
12	"Promise <3 Bye-Bye -> Kendo Girl"; Transliteration: "Yakusoku <3 Bai-Bai -> Kendō Shōjo" (Japanese: 約束♥バイバイ→剣道少女)	June 17, 2001
Ran forgets to do her homework again and has to attend a supplementary class. She befriends a girl, Shiori, who is active in the kendo club, but misses her club practice since class was too long. Ran and Shiori hang out, and Shiori tells Ran that she has a tournament coming up, of which Ran offers to buy her a nice dress if she wins. But the next day, Ran overhears rumors that Shiori's family is moving overseas, and hears from Shiori that the rumors are true. Ran does what she can to earn money for the tournament, but has little time to do it.
13	"Super Debutante <3 Goody-Goody → Ran Kotobuki"; Transliteration: "Chō Ojō-sama <3 Buri-Buri → Kotobuki Ran" (Japanese: 超お嬢様♥ブリブリ→寿蘭)	June 24, 2001
Miyu and Aya "wish" for Ran to become smart (while they kept their real wishes to themselves) on a "Let's Play Seal" machine at an amusement park, and the wish ends up coming true. To make matters worse, the machine is being sent away! Can Aya and Miyu reverse the wish in time?
14	"Maki <3 Shiny -> First Year!"; Transliteration: "Maki <3 Pikapika -> Toshio!" (Japanese: 真希♥ピカピカ→ギャル一年生！)	July 1, 2001
Maki Komine, a first-year high school student from an outside district, comes all the way to Shibuya to look for Ran. Maki wants Ran to train her to become a gal. Ran obliges because it's an Ironclad Rule, but she is in for a long day as Maki wants Ran to do things she's never actually done before.
15	"Revenge <3 Burning -> Snowboard Battle"; Transliteration: "Ribenji <3 Meramera -> Sunobō Batoru" (Japanese: リベンジ♥メラメラ→スノボーバトル)	July 8, 2001
Yuya challenges Tatsuki to a snowboard race to appeal to Ran, but fails.
16	"Dappled Sunlight <3 Sparkling -> Romantic Anniversary"; Transliteration: "Komorebi <3 Kirakira -> Renai Kinenbi" (Japanese: 木漏れ日♥キラキラ→恋愛記念日)	July 15, 2001
It's the two year anniversary of Miyu and Yamato, and Ran reflects on the time when Miyu was still a gang leader.
17	"Feelings of Love <3 Wavering -> Aya Confesses!?"; Transliteration: "Koi Gokoro <3 Yurayura -> Aya ga Kokuhaku!?" (Japanese: 恋ゴコロ♥ユラユラ→綾が告白！？)	July 22, 2001
Yuya invites Ran to an amusement park, and Ran invites the rest of the gang. the only problem is, Aya is hesitant to go because of her feelings for the cold and distant Rei.
18	"Odaiba <3 Crackling -> Great Final Battle!"; Transliteration: "Odaiba <3 Bachibachi -> Dai Sakusen!" (Japanese: お台場♥バチバチ→大決戦！)	July 29, 2001
When Aya and Rei finally get a moment alone together, Rei ends up rejecting Aya, claiming that first love is too heavy for him. Meanwhile, Mami decides to settle things with Ran after a series of calamities caused by her and her friends.
19	"Sun <3 Sun-Sun -> Summer Girl!"; Transliteration: "Taiyō <3 San-San -> Natsu Onna!" (Japanese: 太陽♥サンサン→夏オンナ！)	August 5, 2001
Ran tells Tatsuki that an important day is next week, and he thinks she's referring to his birthday.
20	"Mami-rin <3 Dreamy-Eyed -> Her First Love"; Transliteration: "Mami-rin <3 Mero-Mero -> Hatsukoi no Hito" (Japanese: マミリン♥メロメロ→初恋の人)	August 12, 2001
Mami is visited by her first love, Koichi, but she doesn't want him knowing she's a gal.
21	"Certain Victory <3 Go Go -> Sports Fest"; Transliteration: "Hisshō <3 Gō Gō -> Tai Iku Matsuri" (Japanese: 必勝♥ゴーゴー→体育祭)	August 19, 2001
Ran never did any of her summer homework, so she and Nakanishi (her teacher) strike up a deal - she won't have to do any of her summer homework if she beats Gunjo's class in the upcoming Sports Fest.
22	"School Culture Fest <3 Para-Para -> Meisho Queen"; Transliteration: "Gakusai <3 Para-Para -> Meishō Kuīn" (Japanese: 学祭♥パラパラ→明匠クイーン)	August 26, 2001
Yuya invites everyone to Meisho's culture festival. Sayo and Masato sneak in to look after Miyu since it's an all-boys school, Aya and Rei have some alone time, and Ran and Mami participate in the Meisho queen contest.
23	"Tear It Off <3 Rip Rip -> Teacher's Gold Plate Exterior"; Transliteration: "Hagase <3 Beri Beri -> Kyōshi no Mekki" (Japanese: はがせ♥ベリベリ→教師のメッキ)	September 2, 2001
Takazawa, a girl in Gunjo's class, is being bullied and ignored by the other students. Ran upset about this, tries to get Gunjo to do something, but he refuses.
24	"Off to Machida <3 The Monkey Leaves -> Tatsukichi Gets Dumped!?"; Transliteration: "Machida he <3 Saru Saru -> Tatsukichi Shitsuren!?" (Japanese: 町田へ♥サル去る→タツキチ失恋！？)	September 9, 2001
Ran receives a fortune saying that bad luck will come from monkeys. Ran believes it's Tatsuki and does whatever she can to avoid him.
25	"Yamato <3 Dead Serious -> Proposes!?"; Transliteration: "Yamato <3 Maji Maji -> Puropōzu!?" (Japanese: 大和♥マジマジ→プロポーズ！？)	September 16, 2001
Miyu is feeling insecure as her tuition is barely getting paid, her mother wants her out of her hair, and she's never been completely sure of Yamato's feelings for her. Miyu looks for a job to gain independence and then works at the job, only to find that the owner had hired her so he could try to entice her into becoming a prostitute. But Yamato, being a very mature and sensitive guy, decides it's the right time to take the next step in their relationship.
26	"Super Cop <3 Hard-Working -> Ran Kotobuki"; Transliteration: "Chō Keiji <3 Bari-Bari -> Kotobuki Ran" (Japanese: 超刑事♥バリバリ→寿蘭)	September 23, 2001
Ran wins a strange pillow at a raffle which can transmit thoughts to someone in their sleep. Ran gives it a try and the pillow somehow turns her into a hard-working super cop.

=== Season 2: The Heart of Shibuya ===
In North America, the episodes were not dubbed into English, but were presented as Japanese with English subtitles.

No.	Title	Original release date
27	"Brother <3 Kichi-kichi -> Naokichi Appears!"; Transliteration: "Burazā <3 Kichi-kichi -> Naokichi Kenzan!" (Japanese: ブラザー♥キチキチ→ナオキチ見参！)	September 30, 2001
Tatsuki's little brother, Naoki Kuroi, is introduced. Naoki immediately develops a crush on Ran and does whatever he can to keep Tatsuki away from her.
28	"Yuya <3 Crying -> Talks About Being a Man"; Transliteration: "Yūya <3 Nakunaku -> Otoko wo Kataru" (Japanese: 裕也♥ナクナク→男を語る)	October 7, 2001
Yuya gives Naoki some advice about being a man after Naoki gives up and goes after Miyu. Ran loses her wallet, and Naoki tries to find it before his older brother does.
29	"Mami-rin <3 Love-Love -> Falls For Yuya"; Transliteration: "Mami-rin <3 Rabu-Rabu -> Yūya ni Horeru" (Japanese: マミリン♥ラブラブ→裕也にほれる)	October 14, 2001
Mami breaks up with her boyfriend, and is comforted by Yuya. Eventually, Mami begins to fall for him, only to discover he has a crush on Ran. Mami challenges Ran out of jealousy.
30	"Bukuro <3 In Circles -> Mystery of the Extension"; Transliteration: "Bukuro <3 Guru Guru -> Ekusute no Nazo" (Japanese: ブクロ♥グルグル→エクステの謎)	October 21, 2001
Yuya treats Mami by helping her get a Hair extension, but strangers are after it.
31	"Welcome <3 Exciting -> Grand Opening! Palm Tree"; Transliteration: "Uerukamu <3 Ukiuki -> Kaiten! Pāmu Tsurī" (Japanese: ウェルカム♥ウキウキ→開店！パームツリー)	October 28, 2001
Towa Himejima, a popular idol from the Shibuya district, opens up a restaurant called the Palm Tree. Hooligans mess up the place and Ran decides to take them down.
32	"Ran-pyon <3 Irritated -> A New Rival!?"; Transliteration: "Ran-pyon <3 Iraira -> Arata na Raibaru!?" (Japanese: 蘭ぴょん♥イライラ→新たなライバル！？)	November 4, 2001
Ran gets a call from someone threatening to destroy Miyu's cell phone if she does not stop being a gal.
33	"Kasumi <3 Pissed -> The Great Plot for Revenge!"; Transliteration: "Kasumi <3 Mukamuka -> Ribenji Dai Sakusen!" (Japanese: カスミ♥ムカムカ→リベンジ大作戦！)	November 11, 2001
A girl named Kasumi Tsukino wants to become the number one gal, but to do so, she must defeat Ran. She plans all sorts of schemes to take Ran down and claim Ran's title.
34	"Aya-ppe <3 Teary-Eyed -> Otohata Syndrome"; Transliteration: "Aya-ppe <3 Uru-Uru -> Otohata Byō" (Japanese: 綾っぺ♥ウルウル→乙幡病)	November 18, 2001
Aya meets Kazuki Katase, a friendly guy who wants to comfort her and even help her out with the upcoming culture festival.
35	"Romantic Forecast <3 Unclear -> Otohata then Katase!?"; Transliteration: "Renai Yohō <3 Moyamoya -> Otohata nochi Katase!?" (Japanese: 恋愛予報♥モヤモヤ→乙幡のち片瀬！？)	November 25, 2001
Katase takes it upon himself to confront Rei about his and Aya's relationship, but he too is in love with Aya. Meanwhile, Ran ends up facing Mami in a tennis tournament between two schools.
36	"Hot Springs <3 Viva Viva -> The Gal Incident in the Northern Steam Clouds"; Transliteration: "Onsen <3 Biba Biba -> Kita no Yukemuri Gyaru Jiken" (Japanese: 温泉♥ビバビバ→北の湯けむりギャル事件)	December 2, 2001
Maki Komine invites Ran to the Hot Springs, but Ran becomes the prime suspect in a crime there. Key animation made by T-rex anime/hentai studios
37	"Secret <3 Revealed -> Mami-rin in Danger!"; Transliteration: "Himitsu <3 Barebare -> Mami-rin no Kiki!" (Japanese: 秘密♥バレバレ→マミリンの危機！)	December 9, 2001
Mami must deal with her debutante reality mixing with her relationship with Yuya. Meanwhile, a hacker has screwed up the Honda family's security system, setting loose a Robodog that attacks Mami, Ran, and the gang during their "tour" of the mansion.
38	"Heart <3 Aching -> Otohata's Words"; Transliteration: "Kokoro <3 Jinjin -> Otohata no Kotoba" (Japanese: ココロ♥ジンジン→乙幡の言葉)	December 16, 2001
Ran is asked by Nananishi to search for a ghost that's been haunting the school. Meanwhile, Aya and Katase's relationship comes to a critical juncture when Katase wants Aya to stop wearing her dog tag accessory that symbolizes her friendship with Miyu and Ran.
39	"Christmas Eve <3 Ring-Ring -> Emergency Bell of Love"; Transliteration: "Seiya <3 Rin-Rin -> Koi no Hijō Beru" (Japanese: 聖夜♥リンリン→恋の非常ベル)	December 23, 2001
Ran and Tatsuki have to decide what presents to buy for each other. When Ran starts acting friendly with Rei and poses with him in a picture, Tatsuki takes this as a sign that their relationship could be over.
40	"Ran-pyon <3 Dizzy -> Becomes Sayo!?"; Transliteration: "Ran-pyon <3 Kurakura -> Sayo ni Naru!?" (Japanese: 蘭ぴょん♥クラクラ→沙夜になる！？)	January 6, 2002
Sayo accidentally makes her wish to be Ran come true, and the two Kotobuki sisters must try to cope with it until it wears off.
41	"Shibuya Soldier <3 Mystery -> Maru-Q Moon"; Transliteration: "Shibuya Senshi <3 Nazonazo -> Maru-Kyū Mūn" (Japanese: 渋谷戦士♥ナゾナゾ→マルキュームーン)	January 13, 2002
Kasumi tricks the ganguro trio by telling them that Ran's been badmouthing them. When they discover the truth they pursue Kasumi in hope of getting revenge. Kasumi finds a sailro uniform and a mask, and uses it as a disguise she calls "Maru-Q Moon" (which is a parody of Sailor Moon). Unfortunately, the disguise doesn't save her from the three girls, although the hero becomes incredibly popular.
42	"Taizo <3 Enthusiastic -> Police Training Project!"; Transliteration: "Taizō <3 Norinori -> Keikan Yōsei Purojekuto!" (Japanese: 泰三♥ノリノリ→警官養成プロジェクト！)	January 20, 2002
Taizo runs a police training camp.
43	"Pure Love <3 Nervous -> Rie's Love Tale"; Transliteration: "Junjō <3 Mojimoji -> Rie no Koi Bana" (Japanese: 純情♥モジモジ→理恵の恋バナ)	January 27, 2002
Rie Aihara takes on a part-time job, and meets her schoolmate and first crush from five years ago, Junichi Ota.
44	"Killed in the Line of Duty <3 Weeping -> Odaiba Shark's Final Day!"; Transliteration: "Junshoku <3 Shikushiku -> Odaiba Shāku Saigo no Hi!" (Japanese: 殉職♥シクシク→お台場シャーク最後の日！)	February 3, 2002
Sayo and Matsuda, the actor who played Detective Kudo in Odaiba Cop, are sad that Detective Kudo died in the season finale. Ran and co. try to cheer Sayo up and set the two up on a date.
45	"Signs of Love <3 Various -> Valentine's Day"; Transliteration: "Koi Moyō <3 Iroiro -> Barentain Dē" (Japanese: 恋模様♥イロイロ→バレンタインデー)	February 10, 2002
The girls have trouble getting chocolate across to their respective boyfriends.
46	"Clash <3 Slurp Slurp -> Ramen Battle!"; Transliteration: "Gekitotsu <3 Churu Churu -> Rāmen Batoru!" (Japanese: 激突♥チュルチュル→ラーメンバトル！)	February 17, 2002
A new Ramen business opens next to the Kuroi's Ramen shop, and Ran holds a competition to see which one is better.
47	"Kasumi <3 Toasty Warm -> Dream Coat"; Transliteration: "Kasumi <3 Poka Poka -> Akogare no Kōto" (Japanese: カスミ♥ポカポカ→憧れのコート)	February 24, 2002
Kasumi desires an old purple coat at a thrift shop because it looks like the one her super gal idol that saved her used to wear. Ran wants it too, and neither of them have the money to get it.
48	"Gal Battle <3 Fierce -> Mami-rin Finished!?"; Transliteration: "Gyaru Batoru <3 Gangan -> Mami-rin Hakyoku!?" (Japanese: ギャルバトル♥ガンガン→マミリン破局！？)	March 3, 2002
Mami is still convinced that Yuya likes Ran (when he really let go of that crush) and challenges Ran to a karaoke match after Yuya receives a call about it.
49	"Heartbreak <3 Painful -> Miyu's Place to Call Home"; Transliteration: "Shōshin <3 Hirihiri -> Miyu no Kaeru Basho" (Japanese: 傷心♥ヒリヒリ→美由の帰る場所)	March 10, 2002
Miyu tries to raise money to save her apartment with Aya's help, but things take a turn for the worse when Miyu's mother shows up.
50	"Misgivings of the Heart <3 Stirring -> Cold Spring Breeze"; Transliteration: "Koi no Giwaku <3 Zawazawa -> Tsumetai Haru Kaze" (Japanese: 恋の疑惑♥ザワザワ→冷たい春風)	March 17, 2002
Ran takes her finals and Miyu continues her search for a place to stay. Meanwhile, Aya and Tatsuki discover a picture of Ran and Rei together in a magazine, and question their relationships.
51	"Friendship <3 Smiles -> ID Plates of the Heart"; Transliteration: "Yūjō <3 Nikoniko -> Kokoro no Ai Dī Purēto" (Japanese: 友情♥ニコニコ→心のIDプレート)	March 24, 2002
Rumors continue to fly that Ran and Rei are a couple. Aya gives up being a gal, moves to the honor class and goes missing.
52	"Goodbye <3 Ran-ran -> The Skies of Shibuya Remain Unchanging"; Transliteration: "Sayonara <3 Ran-ran -> Shibuya no Sora wa Kawari na" (Japanese: さよなら♥ランラン→渋谷の空は変わりな)	March 31, 2002
A year has passed since the previous episode. Miyu and Yamato's relationship continues to blossom, while Aya strives to be brave when talking with Rei. Mami and Yuya seem to be hitting it off pretty well. The Junior Detectives are now the High School Detectives. Naoki is crushed that Towa is leaving, but another gal catches his attention! Everyone prepare a big party for Towa, and wait until Ran returns to start it.

== Video games ==
Three video games have been created by Konami. The first video game has the same title as the anime and was released on July 26, 2001. The second video game is titled Super GALS! Kotobuki Ran 2 ~Miracle -> Getting~ (超ギャルズ！寿蘭2 〜ミラクル→ゲッティング〜, Sūpā Gyaruzu! Kotobuki Ran Tsū ~Mirakuru -> Gettingu~) and was released on February 7, 2002. The third video game is titled Super GALS! Kotobuki Ran Special -> Coolmen Get You Gals Party -> (超ギャルズ！寿蘭すぺしゃる→イケメンゲッチューギャルズパーティー→, Sūpā Gyaruzu! Kotobuki Ran Supesharu -> Ikemen Getchū Gyaruzu Pātī ->) and was released on August 8, 2002.

== Other appearances ==
Several Gals! characters make their appearances outside their series in an Kochira Katsushika-ku Kameari Kōen-mae Hashutsujo crossover manga entitled Shin Kochikame.

== Reception ==
THEM Anime Reviews gave the anime series five stars out of five, calling it one of the "most bright, well-animated titles to come out of fiscally-challenged Pierrot in quite some time". Chris Beveridge gave the complete DVD set an overall positive review, saying it is "ten discs of excellent anime at a fantastic price point that needs to be seen, enjoyed and treasured". Erin Finnegan of Anime News Network recommended the series to anyone who is a fan of hyperactivity or Shibuya street culture. Bamboo Dong of Anime News Network gave the anime the complete DVD set an A for the Japanese voice acting, a B+ for the English voice acting, a B+ for story, a C for Animation, an A− for art and a B for music.

== See also ==
- Para Para, a dance often seen in this series, is a type of dancing in which the dancers perform preset movements, usually unique to the song.
