= Jungle Smile =

- Origin: Japan
- Genres: Pop
- Years active: 1994–2002 (on hiatus)
- Labels: Speedstar Records

Jungle Smile (ジャングルスマイル), sometimes referred to as simply Junsma (ジャンスマ), is a Japanese musical duo. It was formed in 1994. They won a music contest sponsored by Yamaha in October 1995 with their song "Cherry Boy". They were signed to Victor Speedstar Records soon after and debuted in November 1996 with the single "Kaze wo Okosou". They won an award from the All-Japan Cable Radio Awards for Best New Artist in 1997 with their next single "Kataomoi", which was also used in a TV program. They enjoyed considerable popularity in the late 1990s due to their songs being used in TV commercials for Japan Airlines and Hokkaido Engineering Academy, and are known to anime fans for their contribution of the ending theme of DT Eightron, "Onaji Hoshi" in 1998 and the ending theme of Super GALS! Kotobuki Ran, "Dakishimetai" in 2001.

Jungle Smile has been on hiatus since December 2002.

== Members ==
- Ikuno Takagi (高木郁乃) - born June 29, 1975, in Yokosuka and raised in Niigata. Vocalist and lyricist. Since Jungle Smile's hiatus, she has done several public performances for charity events, but otherwise appears to have steered her career away from music.
- Isao Yoshida (吉田 功・ゐさお) - born October 1, 1972, in Takasaki, Gunma Prefecture. Composer and arranger. He enjoys cooking, photography and do-it-yourself home projects. He has produced songs for other artists such as CORE OF SOUL and Mayumi Iizuka, and is currently teamed up with a member of CORE OF SOUL to create the duo Micom Brothers.

== Discography ==
=== Singles ===
- 1996.11.21: Kaze wo Okosou (風をおこそう)
- 1997.03.21: Kataomoi (片思い)
- 1997.06.21: Bōken (ROMAN) (冒険（ロマン）)
- 1998.01.21: Chiisa na Kakumei (小さな革命)
- 1998.06.24: Onaji Hoshi (おなじ星)
- 1998.11.26: Shiroi Koibito (白い恋人)
- 2000.02.23: Tobe! ICARUS (翔べ!イカロス)
- 2000.05.24: Inori (祈り)
- 2000.11.16: Jūrokusai (16歳)
- 2001.05.23: Dakishimetai (抱きしめたい)

=== Albums ===
- 1997.07.24: Niji no Capsule (虹のカプセル)
- 1998.09.02: Ringo no Tameiki (林檎のためいき)
- 1999.06.23: Natsuiro Cinema (夏色シネマ)
- 2000.03.23: Asunaro (あすなろ)
- 2001.07.18: Junsma Pop (ジャンスマポップ) - singles collection album. Re-released in 2005 and 2007.
