= Ryōka Shima =

Japanese voice actress and singer (born 1972)

Ryōka Shima (島 涼香, Shima Ryōka; born April 29, 1972 in Saitama) is a Japanese former voice actress and singer. On April 29, 2018, she announced her indefinite hiatus from the voice acting industry.

== Notable voice roles ==
- Cyber Team in Akihabara - Hibari Hinakoganei
- Gate Keepers - Yasue Okamori
- Happy Lesson - Fumitsuki Nanakorobi
- Kaleido Star - Macquarie
- Magical Play - Pipin
- Super GALS! Kotobuki Ran - Rie
