= Cute (Japanese group) discography =

Cute discography
- Studio albums: 9
- Compilation albums: 2
- Singles: 23
- Music videos: 29 (Note: This does not include the alternate versions: dance versions, close-up versions, and so on.)

The discography of the Japanese idol group Cute consists of 23* singles, 9 studio albums, and 2 compilation albums. Beginning with the Cute's major debut back in 2007, all its singles* reached the Top 10 in the Oricon Weekly Chart.

* Not counting two special singles that were intended for limited distribution only.

== Albums ==
=== Studio albums ===
Title	Release date	Peak chart positions	Sales (Oricon)
Title	Release date	JPN	Sales (Oricon)
Cutie Queen Vol. 1 (キューティークイーン VOL．1)	October 25, 2006	15	15,752
2 Mini: Ikiru to Iu Chikara (Note: Despite being a mini album, it was considered their second album and numbered second.) (②mini ～生きるという力～)	April 17, 2007	21	9,388
3rd: Love Escalation! (3rd～LOVE エスカレーション！～)	March 12, 2008	10	17,099
4 Akogare My Star (④憧れMySTAR)	January 28, 2009	13	13,724
Shocking 5 (ショッキング5)	February 24, 2010	25	7,345
Chō Wonderful! 6 (超WONDERFUL!6)	April 6, 2011	20	7,716
Dai Nana Shō 'Utsukushikutte Gomen ne' (第七章「美しくってごめんね」)	February 8, 2012	15	8,171
8 Queen of J-pop	September 4, 2013	6	14,892
°Cmaj9	December 23, 2015	8	16,563

=== Compilation albums ===
Title	Release date	Peak chart positions	Sales (Oricon)
Title	Release date	JPN	Sales (Oricon)
Cute Nan Desu! Zen Single Atsumechaimashita! 1 (°C－uteなんです！全シングル集めちゃいましたっ！①)	November 18, 2009	17	9,558
2 Cute Shinseinaru Best Album (②°C-ute神聖なるベストアルバム)	November 21, 2012	12	24,613

== Singles ==
=== Independent releases ===
These singles were not released on a major record label. They were only sold at concerts, fan club events and at the Hello! Project Official Shop. These singles have no coupling tunes.

Title	Release date	Notes
"Massara Blue Jeans" (まっさらブルージーンズ, Massara Burū Jīnzu)	May 6, 2006	
"Soku Dakishimete" (即 抱きしめて)	June 3, 2006	
"Ōkina Ai de Motenashite" (大きな愛でもてなして)	July 9, 2006	Ending theme for the anime Kirarin Revolution
"Wakkyanai (Z)" (わっきゃない（Z）)	July 29, 2006	Last single to feature Megumi Murakami

=== Major-label releases ===
Title	Release date	Peak chart positions		Sales (Oricon)	Notes
Title	Release date	JPN Oricon	JPN Hot 100	Sales (Oricon)	Notes
"Sakura Chirari" (桜チラリ)	February 21, 2007	5	—	26,595	
"Meguru Koi no Kisetsu" (めぐる恋の季節)	July 11, 2007	5	—	26,785	
"Tokaikko Junjō" (都会っ子 純情)	October 17, 2007	3	—	38,085	
"Lalala Shiawase no Uta" (LALALA 幸せの歌)	February 27, 2008	6	18	31,650	
"Koero! Rakuten Eagles" (越えろ!楽天イーグルス, Koero! Rakuten Īgurusu)	March 20, 2008	–	–		Limited distribution
"Namida no Iro" (涙の色)	April 23, 2008	4	26	33,426	
"Edo no Temari Uta II" (江戸の手毬唄II) (Note: This single is a version of "Edo No Temari Uta I", released by Enka singer Hiroshi Itsuki, who is also an Up-Front Works artist.)	July 30, 2008	5	23	35,789	
"Forever Love"	November 26, 2008	5	22	29,144	Last single to feature Kanna Arihara.
"Bye Bye Bye!"	April 15, 2009	4	11	27,918	
"Shochū Omimai Mōshiagemasu" (暑中お見舞い申し上げます)	July 1, 2009	5	20	33,613	Cover of "Shochū Omimai Mōshiagemasu" by Candies.
"Everyday Zekkōchō!" (EVERYDAY絶好調！！)	September 16, 2009	2	19	27,750	Last single to feature Erika Umeda
"Shock!"	January 6, 2010	5	19	23,389	
"Campus Life (Umarete Kite Yokatta)" (キャンパスライフ～生まれて来てよかった～, Kyanpasu Raifu (Umare Kite Yokatta))	April 28, 2010	5	26	23,932	
"Dance de Bakōn!" (Danceでバコーン！)	August 25, 2010	8	19	23,644	
"Akuma de Cute na Seishun Graffiti" (アクマでキュートな青春グラフィティ, Akuma Kyūto na Seishun Gurafiti)	October 13, 2010	–	–		Sold only at performances of Cutie Musical "Akuma no Tsubuyaki": Akuma de Cute na Seishun Graffiti
"Aitai Lonely Christmas" (会いたいロンリークリスマス, Aitai Ronrī Kurisumasu)	December 1, 2010	6	20	26,238	
"Kiss Me Aishiteru" (Kiss me 愛してる)	February 23, 2011	4	16	23,925	
"Momoiro Sparkling" (桃色スパークリング, Momoiro Supākuringu)	May 25, 2011	6	21	23,961	
"Sekaiichi Happy na Onna no Ko" (世界一HAPPYな女の子)	September 7, 2011	6	27	19,830	
"Kimi wa Jitensha Watashi wa Densha de Kitaku" (君は自転車 私は電車で帰宅)	April 18, 2012	3	18	46,096	
"Aitai Aitai Aitai na" (会いたい 会いたい 会いたいな)	September 5, 2012	4	13	49,686	
"Kono Machi" (この街)	February 6, 2013	4	12	26,784	
"Crazy Kanzen na Otona" (Crazy 完全な大人)	April 3, 2013	3	7	52,202	
"Kanashiki Amefuri / Adam to Eve no Dilemma" (悲しき雨降り／アダムとイブのジレンマ, Kanashiki Amefuri / Adamu to Ibu no Jirenma)	July 10, 2013	4		64,080	
"Tokai no Hitorigurashi / Aitte Motto Zanshin" (都会の一人暮らし／愛ってもっと斬新)	November 6, 2013	3		67,748	
"Kokoro no Sakebi o Uta ni Shitemita / Love Take It All" (心の叫びを歌にしてみた／Love take it all)	March 5, 2014	2		67,534	
"The Power / Kanashiki Heaven (Single Version)" (The Power／悲しきヘブン(Single Version))	July 16, 2014	3		57,766	
"I Miss You / The Future"	November 19, 2014	4		62,690	
"The Middle Management (Josei Chūkan Kanrishoku) / Gamusha Life / Tsugi no Kado o Magare" (The Middle Management ～女性中間管理職～／我武者LIFE／次の角を曲がれ)	April 1, 2015	3		63,870	
"Arigatō (Mugen no Yell) / Arashi o Okosunda Exciting Fight!" (ありがとう～無限のエール～／嵐を起こすんだ Exciting Fight！)	October 28, 2015	3		73,018	
"Naze Hito wa Arasou n' Darō? / Summer Wind / Jinsei wa Step!" (何故 人は争うんだろう？／Summer Wind／人生はSTEP！)	April 20, 2016	2		66,658	
"Mugen Climax / Ai wa Marude Seidenki / Singing (Ano Koro no Yō ni)" (夢幻クライマックス／愛はまるで静電気／Singing～あの頃のように～)	November 2, 2016	2	2	61,315	Certified Gold by RIAJ.
"To Tomorrow / Final Squall / The Curtain Rises"	March 29, 2017	2		69,730	

== Filmography ==
=== DVDs ===
Title	Release date	Contents
Concerts
Cute Cutie Circuit 2006 Final in Yomiurland East Live: 9gatsu 10ka wa Cute no Hi (Cutie Circuit 2006 Final in YOMIURILAND EAST LIVE～9月10日は°C-uteの日～)	December 6, 2006	Performance on September 10, 2006 in Yomiuri Land East
Cute Debut Solo Concert 2007 Spring: Hajimattayo! Cutie Show (°C-ute デビュー単独コンサート 2007 春 ～始まったよ! キューティーショー～)	April 18, 2007	First concert series on February 25, 2007 at Nihon Seinenkan
Cute Concert Tour 2007 Spring: Golden First Date	July 18, 2007	Performance in April 2007 at Tokyo Kōsei Nenkin Kaikan
Cute Cutie Circuit 2007: Magical Cutie Tour & 9gatsu 10ka wa Cute no Hi	November 21, 2007	Performance on September 10, 2007
Cute Live Tour 2007 Fall: Hōkago no Essence	December 19, 2007	
Cute Live Tour 2008 Spring: Love Escalation	April 24, 2008	
Berryz Kobo & Cute; Nakayoshi Battle Concert Tour 2008 Haru: Berryz Kamen vs Cutie Ranger with Cute tracks	July 9, 2008	
Cute Concert Tour 2008 Natsu: Wasuretaku nai Natsu	November 12, 2008	
Cute Cutie Circuit 2008: 9gatsu 10ka wa Cute no Hi	December 17, 2008	
Cute Concert Tour 2009 Haru: ABC	July 22, 2009	
Cute Cutie Circuit 2009: 9gatsu 10ka wa Cute no Hi	November 25, 2009	
Cute Concert Tour 2009 Natsu Aki: Cutie Jump!	January 27, 2010	
Cute Cutie Circuit 2009: Five	February 17, 2010	
Cute Concert Tour 2010 Haru: Shocking Live (°C-uteコンサートツアー2010春～ショッキングLIVE～)	July 7, 2010	
Cute Cutie Cirsuit 2010: 9gatsu 10ka wa Cute no Hi (°C-ute Cutie Circuit 2010 ～9月10日は°C-uteの日～)	November 24, 2010	
Cute Concert Tour 2010 Natsu Aki: Dance Special!! "Cho Uranaito!!" (°C-uteコンサートツアー2010夏秋～ダンススペシャル!!「超占イト!!」～)	December 22, 2010	
Cute & S/milage Premium Live 2011 Spring: C&S Collaboration Daisakusen (°C-ute & スマイレージ プレミアムライブ2011春 〜°C&Sコラボレーション大作戦〜)	July 13, 2011	
Cute Concert Tour 2011 Haru "Cho! Cho Wonderful Tour" (°C-uteコンサートツアー2011春『超! 超ワンダフルツアー』)	September 28, 2011	
Cute Cutie Circuit 2011: 9gatsu 10nichi wa Cute no Hi (°C-ute Cutie Circuit 2011〜9月10日は°C-uteの日)	November 30, 2011	
Berryz Kobo & Cute Collabo Concert Tour 2011 Aki: Berikyu Island (Berryz工房&°C-ute コラボコンサートツアー2011秋 〜ベリキューアイランド〜)	February 29, 2012	
"Maimi Yajima & Airi Suzuki Acoustic Live at Yokohama BLITZ" DVD (「矢島舞美 & 鈴木愛理 アコースティックライブ at 横浜BLITZ」DVD)	June 15, 2012	
Cute Concert Tour 2012 Haru Natsu: Utsukushikutte Gomenne (°C-uteコンサートツアー2012春夏〜美しくってごめんね〜)	August 15, 2012	
C-ute Cutie Circuit 2012: 9gatsu 10ka wa C-ute no Hi (°C-ute Cutie Circuit 2012〜9月10日は°C-uteの日)	December 26, 2012	
Cute Concert Tour 2012-2013 Fuyu: Shinseinaru Pentagram (°C-uteコンサートツアー2012〜2013冬 〜神聖なるペンタグラム〜)	May 15, 2013	
Music video compilations
Music V Tokushū 1: Cutie Visual (ミュージックV特集①～キューティービジュアル～)	September 6, 2006	PVs, a live performance, an interview, and "making of" videos
Music V Tokushū 2: Cutie Visual (ミュージックV特集②〜キューティービジュアル〜)	June 24, 2009	
Music V Tokushū 3: Cutie Visual (ミュージックV特集③～キューティービジュアル～)	December 8, 2010	
Music V Tokushū 4: Cutie Visual (ミュージックV特集 (4) 〜キューティービジュアル〜)	March 6, 2013	
Theatre plays
Gekidan Gekihello Dai-2kai Kōen "Neru Ko wa Cute" (劇団ゲキハロ第2回公演「寝る子は°C-ute」)	September 5, 2007	Recorded on June 15, 2007
Gekidan Gekihello Dai-4kai Kōen "Keitai Shosetsuka" (劇団ゲキハロ第4回公演『携帯小説家』)	January 21, 2009	
Gekidan Gekihello Dai-6kai Kōen "Atarumo Hakke!?" (劇団ゲキハロ第6回公演 「あたるも八卦！？」)	September 23, 2009	
Musicals
Cutie Musical "Akuma no Tsubuyaki": Akuma de Cute na Seishun Graffiti (キューティー・ミュージカル「悪魔のつぶやき」～アクマでキュートな青春グラフィティ～)	January 19, 2011	
Television shows
Berikyū!! Vol. 1 (ベリキュー！Vol.1)	May 27, 2009	Berryz Kobo, Cute
Berikyū!! Vol. 2 (ベリキュー！Vol.2)	May 27, 2009	Berryz Kobo, Cute
Berikyū!! Vol. 3 (ベリキュー！Vol.3)	June 24, 2009	Berryz Kobo, Cute
Berikyū!! Vol. 4 (ベリキュー！Vol.4)	June 24, 2009	Berryz Kobo, Cute
Berikyū!! Vol. 5 (ベリキュー！Vol.5)	July 22, 2009	Berryz Kobo, Cute
Berikyū!! Vol. 6 (ベリキュー！Vol.6)	July 22, 2009	Berryz Kobo, Cute
Berikyū!! Vol. 7 (ベリキュー！Vol.7)	August 26, 2009	Berryz Kobo, Cute
Berikyū!! Vol. 8 (ベリキュー！Vol.8)	August 26, 2009	Berryz Kobo, Cute
Others
Cute Suzuki Airi in Okinawa Airi's Classic (°C-ute 鈴木愛理 in 沖縄 AIRI'S CLASSIC 鈴木愛理)	June 25, 2008	
Maimi Yajima - 17's	April 29, 2009	
Airi Suzuki - Pure Blue	July 1, 2009	
Hagiwara Mai in Hachijōjima	October 21, 2009	
Alo-Hello! Cute DVD	October 28, 2009	
Maimi Yajima - Fix no E (Fixの絵)	June 23, 2010	
Airi Suzuki - Natsuyasumi (夏休み)	August 25, 2010	
Maimi Yajima - Black Angels (ブラック・ エンジェルズ, Burakku Enjerusu)	TBA, 2011	
Airi Suzuki - Kibun Tenkan (気分てんかん)	July 13, 2011	
Airi Suzuki - Natsu Karada (夏カラダ)	August 8, 2011	

=== Fan club releases ===
Many DVDs were released to the official fan club and were officially only obtainable by mail order for a limited time.

- Cute DVD Magazine Vol. 1
- Cute DVD Magazine Vol. 2
- Cute DVD Magazine Vol. 3
- Cute DVD Magazine Vol. 4
- Cute DVD Magazine Vol. 5
- Cute DVD Magazine Vol. 6
- Cute DVD Magazine Vol. 7
- Cute DVD Magazine Vol. 8
- Cute DVD Magazine Vol. 9
- Cute DVD Magazine Vol. 10
- Cute DVD Magazine Vol. 11
- Cute DVD Magazine Vol. 12
- Cute DVD Magazine Vol. 13
- Cute DVD Magazine Vol. 14
- Cute DVD Magazine Vol. 15
- Cute DVD Magazine Vol. 16
- Cute DVD Magazine Vol. 17
- Cute DVD Magazine Vol. 18
- Cute DVD Magazine Vol. 19
- Cute DVD Magazine Vol. 20
- Cute DVD Magazine Vol. 21
- Cute DVD Magazine Vol. 22
- Cute DVD Magazine Vol. 23
- Cute DVD Magazine Vol. 24
- Cute DVD Magazine Vol. 25
- Cute DVD Magazine Vol. 26
- Cute DVD Magazine Vol. 27
- Cute DVD Magazine Vol. 28
- Cute DVD Magazine Vol. 29
- Cute DVD Magazine Vol. 30
- Cute DVD Magazine Vol. 31

=== Blu-ray discs ===
#	Title	Release date	Contents
Concerts
—	°C-ute Concert Tour 2010 Haru: Shocking LIVE (°C-uteコンサートツアー2010春～ショッキングLIVE～)	November 24, 2010	
—	°C-ute Concert Tour 2010 Natsu Aki: Dance Special!! "Cho Uranaito!!" (°C-uteコンサートツアー2010夏秋～ダンススペシャル!!「超占イト!!」～)	February 23, 2011	
—	°C-ute & S/milage Premium Live 2011 Haru - C&S Collaboration Daisakusen (°C-ute & スマイレージ プレミアムライブ2011春 〜°C&Sコラボレーション大作戦〜)	August 3, 2011	
—	°C-ute Concert Tour 2011 Haru "Cho! Cho Wonderful Tour" (°C-uteコンサートツアー2011春『超! 超ワンダフルツアー』)	September 28, 2011	
—	°C-ute Zen Single Music Video Blu-ray File 2011 (°C-ute 全シングル MUSIC VIDEO Blu-ray File 2011)	December 21, 2011	
—	Berryz Kobo & °C-ute Collabo Concert Tour 2011 Aki - Berikyu Island - (Berryz工房&°C-ute コラボコンサートツアー2011秋 〜ベリキューアイランド〜)	February 29, 2012	
—	Alo-Hello! 2 °C-ute Blu-ray (アロハロ! 2 °C-ute Blu-ray)	July 11, 2012	
—	°C-ute Concert Tour 2012 Haru Natsu - Utsukushikutte Gomenne - (°C-uteコンサートツアー2012春夏〜美しくってごめんね〜)	August 15, 2012	
—	Music V Tokushu (4) Cutie Visual (ミュージックV特集 (4) 〜キューティービジュアル〜)	March 20, 2013	
—	°C-ute Concert Tour 2012-2013 Fuyu - Shinseinaru Pentagram - (°C-uteコンサートツアー2012〜2013冬 〜神聖なるペンタグラム〜)	May 15, 2013	

== Radio ==
- Cutie Party – FM-Fuji, Saturday 23:00-23:30 JST (Yajima, Suzuki, and Okai; October 7, 2006, to September 27, 2008) as the opening portion of Hello! Project Night
- Cute Cutie Paradise (°C-ute キューティー☆パラダイス) – Radio Nihon, Tuesdays 21:30-22:00 JST (Umeda & Suzuki, since November 5, 2008)

== Bibliography ==
=== Photobooks ===
- Berryz Kobo & Cute in Hello! Project 2006 Summer (Released September 21, 2006)
- So Cute! – Cute first photobook (February 21, 2007)
- Hajimattayo! Cutie Show – Cute debut solo concert live photobook (April 11, 2007)
- Moving down through Japan! Travel Diary of Cute in 2007 Summer – photobook of Cutie Circuit 2007: Magical Cutie Tour (October 4, 2007)
