= 2 Cute Shinseinaru Best Album =

- Regular Edition cover

Compilation album by Cute
- Released: November 21, 2012 (Japan)
- Genres: J-pop, pop
- Length: 65:46
- Label: Zetima
- Producer: Tsunku

Cute chronology
| Dai Nana Shō "Utsukushikutte Gomen ne" (2012) | 2 Cute Shinseinaru Best Album (2012) | 8 Queen of J-pop (2013) |

2 Cute Shinseinaru Best Album (2°C-ute神聖なるベストアルバム, Ni Kyūto Shinseinaru Besuto Arubamu; "Two. Cute's Divine Best Album") is the second best compilation album by the Japanese girl group Cute, released on November 21, 2012.

== Background ==
The album is primarily a compilation of Cute's hit songs. The older songs were remixed with new vocal tracks, some were-arranged. The album also contains one new song, titled "Daisuki no Imi o Oshiete".

== Release information ==
The album was released in three versions: Regular Edition and Limited Editions A and B. The regular edition is CD-only, both limited editions include a DVD. All editions will include a randomly seeded trading card (of 5 types total).

== Track listing ==
All tracks are written by Tsunku (except "Edo no Temari Uta II", written by Osamu Yoshioka and composed by Ryudo Uzaki).

CD
| No. | Title | Artist(s) / Notes | Length |
|---|---|---|---|
| 1. | "Massara Blue Jeans (2012 Shinseinaru Ver.)" (まっさらブルージーンズ（2012神聖なるVer.）) |
| 2. | "Soku Dakishimete (2012 Shinseinaru Ver.)" (即 抱きしめて（2012神聖なるVer.）) |
| 3. | "Ōki na Ai de Motenashite (2012 Shinseinaru Ver.)" (大きな愛でもてなして（2012神聖なるVer.）) | Saki Nakajima, Mai Hagiwara |
| 4. | "Wakkyanai (Z) (2012 Shinseinaru Ver.)" (わっきゃない（Ｚ）（2012神聖なるVer.）) |
| 5. | "Sakura Chirari (2012 Shinseinaru Ver.)" (桜チラリ（2012神聖なるVer.）) |
| 6. | "Jump (2012 Shinseinaru Ver.)" (JUMP（2012神聖なるVer.）, originally from the single "Sakura Chirari") |
| 7. | "Tokaikko Junjō (2012 Shinseinaru Ver.)" (都会っ子純情（2012神聖なるVer.）) |
| 8. | "Lalala Shiawase no Uta (2012 Shinseinaru Ver.)" (LALALA 幸せの歌（2012神聖なるVer.）) | Maimi Yajima, Chisato Okai |
| 9. | "Namida no Iro (2012 Shinseinaru Ver.)" (涙の色（2012神聖なるVer.）) |
| 10. | "Edo no Temari Uta II (2012 Shinseinaru Ver.)" (江戸の手毬唄II（2012神聖なるVer.）) | Airi Suzuki |
| 11. | "Seishun Song (2012 Shinseinaru Ver.)" (青春ソング（2012神聖なるVer.）, originally from the album "4 Akogare My Star") |
| 12. | "Dance de Bakōn!" (Danceでバコーン!) | 13th single |
| 13. | "Kiss Me Aishiteru" (Kiss me 愛してる) | 15th single |
| 14. | "Sekaiichi Happy na Onna no Ko" (世界一HAPPYな女の子) | 17th single |
| 15. | "Kimi wa Jitensha Watashi wa Densha de Kitaku" (君は自転車 私は電車で帰宅) | 18th single |
| 16. | ""Daisuki" no Imi o Oshiete" (「大好き」の意味を教えて!) | new song |

Limited Edition A DVD
| No. | Title | {{{extra_column}}} | Length |
|---|---|---|---|
| 1. | "Massara Blue Jeans (2012 Shinseinaru Ver.)" (まっさらブルージーンズ（2012神聖なるVer.）) |
| 2. | "Soku Dakishimete (2012 Shinseinaru Ver.)" (即 抱きしめて（2012神聖なるVer.）) |
| 3. | "Ōki na Ai de Motenashite (2012 Shinseinaru Ver.)" (大きな愛でもてなして（2012神聖なるVer.）) | Saki Nakajima, Mai Hagiwara |
| 4. | "Wakkyanai (Z) (2012 Shinseinaru Ver.)" (わっきゃない（Ｚ）（2012神聖なるVer.）) |
| 5. | "Sakura Chirari (2012 Shinseinaru Ver.)" (桜チラリ（2012神聖なるVer.）) |
| 6. | "Tokaikko Junjō (2012 Shinseinaru Ver.)" (都会っ子純情（2012神聖なるVer.）) |
| 7. | "Lalala Shiawase no Uta (2012 Shinseinaru Ver.)" (LALALA 幸せの歌（2012神聖なるVer.）) | Maimi Yajima, Chisato Okai |
| 8. | "Namida no Iro (2012 Shinseinaru Ver.)" (涙の色（2012神聖なるVer.）) |
| 9. | "Edo no Temari Uta II (2012 Shinseinaru Ver.)" (江戸の手毬唄II（2012神聖なるVer.）) | Airi Suzuki |
| 10. | "Kanashiki Heaven" (悲しきヘブン（Music Video）) |
| 12. | "Kanashiki Heaven (910 Live Ver.)" (11.悲しきヘブン（910 LIVE Ver.）) |

Limited Edition B DVD
| No. | Title | Length |
|---|---|---|
| 1. | "Member interview" |

== Charts ==
| Chart (2012) | Peak position | Debut sales (Oricon) |
|---|---|---|
| Oricon Daily Albums Chart | 5 | |
| Oricon Weekly Albums Chart | 12 | 16,708 |
| Oricon Monthly Singles Chart | 35 | 19,834 |
| Billboard Japan Hot Top Albums | 13 | |
