= Cute Nan Desu! Zen Single Atsumechaimashita! 1 =

- Regular Edition cover

Compilation album by Cute
- Released: November 18, 2009 (Japan)
- Genre: J-pop, pop
- Length: 53:00
- Label: Zetima
- Producer: Tsunku

Cute chronology
4 Akogare My Star (2009)	Cute Nan Desu! Zen Single Atsumechaimashita! 1 (2009)	Shocking 5 (2010)

Cute Nan Desu! Zen Single Atsumechaimashita! 1 (°C-uteなんです!全シングル集めちゃいましたっ!①) is a compilation album by the Japanese idol group Cute, released on November 18, 2009.

The album debuted at number 17 on the Oricon Weekly Albums Chart, remaining in the chart for 2 weeks.

== Track listing ==
CD
No.	Title	Length
1.	"Massara Blue Jeans" (まっさらブルージーンズ)
2.	"Soku Dakishimete" (即 抱きしめて)
3.	"Ōki na Ai de Motenashite" (大きな愛でもてなして)
4.	"Wakkyanai (Z)" (わっきゃない（Ｚ）)
5.	"Sakura Chirari" (桜チラリ)
6.	"Meguru Koi no Kisetsu" (= めぐる恋の季節)
7.	"Tokaikko Junjō" (都会っ子純情)
8.	"Lalala Shiawase no Uta" (LALALA 幸せの歌)
9.	"Namida no Iro" (涙の色)
10.	"Edo no Temari Uta II" (江戸の手毬唄II)
11.	"Forever Love" (FOREVER LOVE)
12.	"Bye Bye Bye!"
13.	"Shochū Omimai Mōshiagemasu" (暑中お見舞い申し上げます)
14.	"Everyday Zekkōchō!!" (EVERYDAY 絶好調!!)

Limited Edition DVD
No.	Title	Length
1.	"Jacket Satsuei Making" (ジャケット撮影メイキング, "Jacket Photography Making of")
2.	"3nenkan no Seichō Kakunin! Interview" (3年間の成長確認! インタビュー)
3.	"Special Interview" (スペシャルインタビュー)
4.	"Cute Kaigi ~Ame Onna Hen~" (°C-ute会議 ～雨女編～)

== Charts ==
Chart (2009)	Peak position	Sales	
Chart (2009)	Peak position	First week	Total
Japan (Oricon Weekly Albums Chart)	17	8,443	9,558
