= List of Kirarin Revolution episodes =

- No. of episodes: 102

Release
- Original network: TV Tokyo
- Original release: April 7, 2006 – March 28, 2008

Season chronology
- Next → Kirarin Revolution Stage 3

Kirarin Revolution was adapted into an animated series in 2006, with animation provided by SynergySP and G&G Entertainment. It aired on TV Tokyo from April 7, 2006, to March 27, 2008, for a total of 102 episodes. In 2007, Viz Media's European branch licensed the anime for European release under the title Kilari!

In the week of December 24–30, 2007, the Kirarin Revolution anime series had an average viewership rating of 2.6%.

The majority of the opening and ending theme songs were performed by Morning Musume member Koharu Kusumi, who also provides the voice for Kirari Tsukishima, under the name Kirari Tsukishima starring Koharu Kusumi (Morning Musume) (月島きらり starring 久住小春(モーニング娘。)). During the summer of 2007, Kusumi performed with Mai Hagiwara from Cute as the Japanese idol girl group Kira Pika, which their characters were also part of in the show.

The opening theme songs are "Koi Kana", used in episodes 1-26; "Balalaika", from episodes 27–51; and "Happy", from episodes 52–67, all of which were performed by Kusumi. From episodes 68–77, "Hana wo Pun", performed by Kusumi and Mai Hagiwara under the name Kira Pika, was used as the opening theme. The fifth opening theme, used from episodes 78–102, was "Chance!", once again performed by Kusumi under her character's name.

The ending theme songs are "Sugao-Flavor" by Kusumi from episodes 1–17; "Ōkina Ai de Motenashite" by Cute from episodes 18–26; "Mizuiro Melody" from episodes 27–38, "Love da yo Darling" from episodes 39–51, and "Koi no Maho wa Habibi no Bi" from episodes 52–64 by Kusumi; "Hana wo Pun" from episodes 65-67 and "Futari wa NS" from episodes 68–77 by Kira Pika; "Ramutara" from episodes 78-90 and "Olala" from episodes 91–102 by Kusumi.

== Episode list ==
No.	Title	Original release date
1	"Kirarin! Idol Revolution!!"; Transliteration: "Kirarin! Aidoru Reboryūsyon!!" (Japanese: きらりん!アイドル革命 (レボリューション)!!)	April 7, 2006
Kirari Tsukishima saves a turtle stuck in a tree, and its owner, Seiji Hiwatari, gives her a ticket to a Ships concert. When she tries to attend the concert, Hiroto Kazama rips up her ticket and tells her that she and Seiji both live in different worlds. Determined, Kirari sneaks into the concert and discovers that Seiji and Hiroto are part of Ships. She declares on live television that she will become an idol.
2	"Heart Pounding! Ships Audition!!"; Transliteration: "Doki-doki! Ships Ōdishon!!" (Japanese: ドキドキ! SHIPSオーディション!!)	April 14, 2006
Kirari attends an idol audition with Ships as part of the panelist of judges, only to find out that the audition is for boys. She disguises herself and enters the audition. Although Kirari's identity is discovered while saving Nā-san, her confidence and persistence allowed her to become an idol.
3	"Aaah! Aim for a Commercial Debut!!"; Transliteration: "Kyā! Mezase CM Debyū!!" (Japanese: キャー! めざせCMデビュー!!)	April 21, 2006
Kirari must compete with Erina Ogura in a cake commercial, where the girl whose commercial appeals to the staff the most will be able to debut. However, Erina secretly tries to make Kirari lose.
4	"Shock! Papa is Against It!?"; Transliteration: "Gabīn! Papa ga Hantai!?" (Japanese: ガビーン! パパが反対!?)	April 28, 2006
Muranishi assigns Kirari a manager: Kasumi Kumoi. Before Kirari can progress as an idol, Kumoi asks for permission from Kirari's father. Much to Kirari's dismay, her father is against the idea. Kirari attempts to find many ways to convince her father to pursue a career in the entertainment world but fails. Seeing Kirari petitioning to become an idol on his way home, Kirari's father decides to approve of her request.
5	"That can't be! The First Job!!"; Transliteration: "Arienāi! Hajimete no Oshigoto!!" (Japanese: ありえなーい!初めてのお仕事!!)	May 5, 2006
Director Nezumi chooses Kirari's first job as an idol. Erina secretly switches the job to a more ridiculous and difficult task: helper of a group of amateur entertainers. Erina makes the task harder by telling, whining, and making direct lies at Tomy, the person who runs Kirari's 1st job. Tomy, originally unsatisfied with Kirari trying to take his place during his shows, finally accepts her.
6	"So tired! Idol Training!!"; Transliteration: "Hero hero~! Aidoru shugyō!!" (Japanese: ヘロヘロ〜ッ!アイドル修行!!)	May 12, 2006
Muranishi eyes Kirari as a marketing model for a company called Rainbow Cosmetics. However, Kirari's unclear and strange mind of being an idol results in a rejection of her modeling for Rainbow Cosmetics. To help Kirari become a proper idol, Muranishi assigns Kirari as the manager of Ships for a day.
7	"Boo! Challenge to a Song!!"; Transliteration: "Boē! Uta e no Chōsen!!" (Japanese: ボエ〜ッ!歌への挑戦!!)	May 19, 2006
An influential CD producer has his eyes set on Kirari and even decides to debut her CD, but Kirari cannot sing. Her destructive singing voice causes her to be kicked out by every CD producer. Nā-san, with some background on singing, teaches her how to become a better singer. With a slim chance of Kirari debuting her first CD, Seiji finds a perfect method to succeed Kirari's singing debut.
8	"Oh No! Live at First Stage!!"; Transliteration: "Awawawa! Hatsu Steiji de Namahōsō!" (Japanese: あわわわ!初ステージで生放送!!)	May 26, 2006
Kirari performs live on TV with SHIPS for the first time! Erina, trying to take place of Kirari, kidnaps Na-san with taiyaki as a bait and ships Na-san into a zoo far away. With the live show about to begin, Kirari desperately searches for Na-san. As the show runs late, Erina convinces the producers to let her perform. Instead, SHIPS will take place until Kirari arrives. Na-san finds his route back and reunites with Kirari just in time for the live show.
9	"Surprise! Illusionist Arashi!!"; Transliteration: "Zabān! Iryūjo'nisuto Arashi ya!!" (Japanese: ザバーン!イリュージョニスト嵐や!!)	June 2, 2006
During Kirari's latest shooting, a mysterious magician attacks Kirari and Ships with a variety of magic tricks and sea creatures. The magician reveals himself as Arashi, who convinces Kirari to quit her idol work and fulfill the promise they made when they were young. Kirari did not realize it was a proposal.
10	"Exciting! Transfer to Idol School!!"; Transliteration: "Uki-Uki! Aidoru Sukūru ni Tenkō!!" (Japanese: うきうき!アイドルスクールに転校!!)	June 9, 2006
As Kirari becomes more recognized by people in the entertainment world, fans and media began to gather around her house. Goin to school also became a problem because of Kirari's work schedule. Muranishi assigns Kirari to a new school for idols that SHIPS attends. Erina, also in her new class, tries to make Kirari's first day a nightmare. However, Erina's plan didn't work out and made Kirari's reputatiom more positive.
11	"Wham! I'm the Heroine!?"; Transliteration: "Dokān! Atashi ga Hiroin!?" (Japanese: どかーん!アタシがヒロイン!?)	June 16, 2006
Kirari will be the leading role of a new drama, "The Sonata of Love and Youth", where the director allows her to choose between Seiji, Hiroto, and Arashi. However, Arashi plans to take Kirari's first kiss and to change the drama.
12	"Noon! Drama Date!!"; Transliteration: "Noon! Dorama na deito!!" (Japanese: のーん!ドラマなデート!!)	June 23, 2006
Since Kirari never had a boyfriend before, she cannot interpret her role properly in the pure love drama.
13	"Smack! Fantastic Kiss!?"; Transliteration: "Chu! Fantasutikku Kisu!?" (Japanese: Chu! ファンタスティックキス!?)	June 30, 2006
Kirari's insecurity about the kiss in the drama interferes with her other idol activities, but with Seiji's help, she finally gains determination to go through with the climactic scene. When the day really comes, however, will she truly really give up her first kiss to Hiroto?
14	"'Is it Love'! Is it Ships? Is it Confrontation?"; Transliteration: "Koi kana? Ships kana? Taiketsu kana?" (Japanese: 「恋☆カナ」! SHIPSかな? 対決かな!?)	July 7, 2006
In order to promote "The Sonata of Love and Youth", there will be a competition between Kirari and Ships to determine who can sell the most CDs. Everyone starts to take sides over who will win, and Kirari, overwhelmed by the pressure, loses her will to fight against her friends.
15	"'Is it Love'! Enter the Music Charts!?"; Transliteration: "「Koi☆Kana」! Chāto In Kana?" (Japanese: 「恋☆カナ」!チャートインかな?)	July 14, 2006
Kirari's lack of resolve to fight against Ships causes her to quit being an idol after the premiere of the drama starring her.
16	"Alright! The Troubling Audition!!"; Transliteration: "Yōsshi! Mō Taihen Ōdishon!!" (Japanese: ヨーッシ!モー大変オーディション!!)	July 21, 2006
As the auditions of a Morning Musume member are coming up, Kirari is inspired by the group that she ends up joining the audition. Hiroto and Seiji soon intervene, saying that this MoMusu audition is a fake. Surprisingly, Morning Musume's leader, Hitomi Yoshizawa, had come in disguise and forces the "judges" to admit defeat.
17	"Heartbeat! The Swimming Meet of Only Idols!!"; Transliteration: "Doki! Aidoru Dake no Suiei-Taikai!!" (Japanese: どきっ! アイドルだけの水泳大会!!)	July 28, 2006
Kirari attends the idol swimming competition with Erina, Ships, and Arashi, but she is not very competitive at these sporting events, making winning a very challenging task for her team. Erina, who fares worse, refuses to go into the water as water will only destroy her appearance. As the competition goes on, Erina's shortcut to protect herself from contact with water only makes their team lose.
18	"Kirari... Summer Vacation Together With Sayaka and Miku"; Transliteration: "Kirari... Sayaka to Miku to Natsuyasumi" (Japanese: キラリ... さやかとみくと夏休み)	August 4, 2006
Two weeks after the film shooting had suddenly been canceled, Kirari spend time with her friends, Sayaka and Miku. However, fans appear and chase the girls around. Sayaka and Miku start to think that Kirari cares for the fans more instead of her friends.
19	"Creepy! The Charged Report of Fear"; Transliteration: "Zozo! Kyōfu no Totsugeki Ripōto" (Japanese: ゾゾ〜ッ!恐怖の突撃リポート)	August 11, 2006
Kirari and Erina have to do a joint segment, where they will solve a mystery in a deserted hotel. Erina wants to get all the credit and tries to trick Kirari again.
20	"Na! My Brother Who Returned!!"; Transliteration: "Na! Kaette Kita Mai Burazā!!" (Japanese: Na! 帰ってきたマイブラザー!!)	August 18, 2006
Kirari's older brother, Subaru, has come from America. Envious of Kirari's idol status, Subaru secretly disguises himself as Kirari to take over one of her jobs.
21	"Meow! Idol Battle Against the Super Fubuki!!"; Transliteration: "Myā! Aidoru Batoru wa Chō Fubuki!!" (Japanese: みゃ〜!アイドルバトルは超ふぶき!!)	August 25, 2006
When Kirari will be part of Nojo's Top Idol competition, she meets Fubuki Tōdō of rivaling Higashiyama Co. When Fubuki claims that Kirari does not have the potential of being a perfect idol, Kirari and Fubuki end up tieing at the competition. Kirari is satisfied with the results, but Fubuki wants a re-match.
22	"Shock! Kiss With Whom In the Wedding!?"; Transliteration: "Zuki! Kissu wa Dare to Wedingu!?" (Japanese: ズキッ!キッスは誰とウェディング!?)	September 1, 2006
The first challenge of the tiebreaker will be to create a wedding scenario with Ships. Kirari chooses Seiji, but does not know why she wants Hiroto.
23	"Stitch Stitch!? Secret Dress and Brother Hiro!"; Transliteration: "Chiku-chiku!? Himitsu no Doresu to Hiro Nii-chan!" (Japanese: チクチク!?ひみつのドレスと宙兄ちゃん!)	September 8, 2006
The second challenge is to create a dress to show to the fans. Hiroto helps Kirari and she soon finds the perfect things needed for her dress.
24	"Ding! Love Song Echoing By the Sea..."; Transliteration: "Kyun! Umi de Yurarete Koi no Uta..." (Japanese: きゅん!海で揺られて恋の詩...)	September 15, 2006
The final challenge is to write lyrics for a song. After going out with Hiroto to the beach, Kirari seems to have found inspiration and feelings of love. This will be the perfect time for Kirari to confess her feelings to Seiji.
25	"Heart-pounding! Announce "Love Fireworks""; Transliteration: "Dokān! To Happyō "Koi-Hanabi"!!" (Japanese: ドカーン!と発表「恋花火」!!)	September 22, 2006
Fubuki has already finished her lyrics while Kirari is running out of time. Hiroto tells Kirari that she express her feelings for Seiji, but she always gets nervous around him. In the end, Kirari's lyrics become her feelings for Hiroto.
26	"Decision! Hot Idol Winner: Nā! Myā! Yān!"; Transliteration: "Kettei! Hotto Aidoru Syō wa Nā! Myā! Yān!" (Japanese: 決定!ホットアイドル賞はなー!みゃ〜!やーん!)	September 29, 2006
Kirari is the winner of the tiebreaker, with Fubuki questioning why she had lost. At the celebration, Fubuki soon recalls how Kirari had technically given her Mya-san. Having admitted loss, Fubuki remains on good terms with Kirari for now.
27	"Cream Puff! Machine Gun Talk Explosive Laughter"; Transliteration: "Shū Kurīmu! Mashingan Tōku de Daibakusyō" (Japanese: シュークリーム!マシンガントークで大爆笑!!)	October 6, 2006
Kirari will star on a talk show, but Higashiyama Co. dispatches a non-stop talking girl to ruin Kirari's image.
28	"Na Na Na! Naa-san Revolution!!"; Transliteration: "Na Na Na! Nā-san☆Reboryūsyon!!" (Japanese: なななっ!なーさん☆レボリューション!!)	October 13, 2006
Seeing Mya-san and ToriToshi in the newspaper, Na-san decides to try to become an idol, following steps that Kirari did to become an idol. As a cat, Na-san was rejected instantly during an idol audition. Kirari decides to give Na-san a chance.
29	"Panic! Idols' Big Battle Against Tests!"; Transliteration: "Panikku! Aidoru-tachi no Tesuto Daisakusen!" (Japanese: パニック!アイドルたちのテスト大作戦!)	October 20, 2006
Kirari was so busy with work that she goes in a panic as exams are coming up. After overhearing that Kirari has to study every chance she gets, Erina secretly tries to get Kirari to fail the exams.
30	"Click! The Big Scoop At the School Festival!?"; Transliteration: "Kasha! Gakuensai De Daisukuupu!?" (Japanese: カシャッ! 学園祭で大スクープ!?)	October 27, 2006
Kirari will be part of a school festival, but since no one has ever seen Kirari's food obsession, she is forbidden to eat too much food because it can ruin her image.
31	"Ah! Love's Stray in New York!?"; Transliteration: "Nyattsu! Koi No Meiro No Nyū Yōku!?" (Japanese: ニャッツ!恋の迷路のニューヨーク!?)	November 3, 2006
While in New York, a sleepy Kirari accidentally gets lost in the city. Without her knowledge of English, how will she find her way back?
32	"Meow~! Tina and Kirari's Revolution"; Transliteration: "Myao~! Tina to Kirari No Reboryūshon" (Japanese: ミャオ〜!ティナときらりのレボリューション)	November 10, 2006
Continuing from the previous episode, Kirari and Seiji are found out by Japanese-American idol Tina Garland. Kirari also spreads her popularity to New York.
33	"Sheep's Eyes! Actress's Soul in the Ocean"; Transliteration: "Nagashime! Ōnabara Ni Joyū-Damashī!!" (Japanese: 流し目!大海原に女優魂!!)	November 17, 2006
When Kirari is cast as the main role in a drama, the other leading actress tests Kirari's confidence with lines not in the script.
34	"Hiro-kun! Grandma's Cat Road of Love!?"; Transliteration: "Hiro-kun! Obā-chan Koi no Nekomichi!?" (Japanese: 宙く〜ん!おばあちゃん恋の猫道!?)	November 24, 2006
Hiroto is out in the streets of Kirari's hometown, where Kirari's grandmother sees him. However, things get worse when Kirari's grandmother drags Hiroto everywhere with her.
35	"Fire! Chief Kirari vs. Phantom X!!"; Transliteration: "Faiyā! Kirari Shochō vs. Kaitō Ekkusu!!" (Japanese: ファイヤー!きらり署長VS怪盗X!!)	December 1, 2006
Doing another publicity stunt, Kirari becomes policewoman for a day and helps a detective track down mysterious criminal Phantom X.
36	"Naa, Mya, Wanī! No.1 Pet Tournament!!"; Transliteration: "Naa, Myā, Wanī! No.1 Petto Ketteisen!!" (Japanese: なー·みゃ〜·わにー!No.1ペット決定戦!!)	December 8, 2006
There is a pet competition where Nā-san, Kame-san, Nayan, Tantan, Mya-san, Toridoshi, and Catherine participate in. However, Higashiyama's director plans to make her Catherine the winner.
37	"Kasumi♪ Cinderella of the Spring Wind"; Transliteration: "Kasumi♪Harukaze no Shinderera♪" (Japanese: かすみ♪春風のシンデレラ♪)	December 15, 2006
As an incident during Kirari's photoshoot reveals so much, Muranishi tells Kirari and Ships about Kasumi Kumoi's past as an idol, and why Muranishi Co. and Higashiyama Co. are rivals.
38	"Confession!? Ships' Birthday!!"; Transliteration: "Kokuhaku!? Ships no Bāsudei!!" (Japanese: 告白!?SHIPSのバースデイ!!)	December 22, 2006
During the 3rd anniversary of Ships' debut on Seiji's birthday, Hiroto sees this as the perfect time for Kirari to confess to Seiji.
39	"Georgeous!! Top Idol Song Battle!!"; Transliteration: "Gōjasu!! Toppu Aidoru Utagassen!!" (Japanese: ゴージャス!!トップアイドル歌合戦!!)	January 5, 2007
Kirari, Ships, Fubuki, Akane attend the Super Idol Festival. With Higashiyama wanting to win, Akane is given the exact same dress design as Kirari's.
40	"So Long Nā-san!? See You Again!!"; Transliteration: "Sayonara Nā-san!? Mata·Nā!!" (Japanese: さよならなーさん!?また·なー!!)	January 12, 2007
When Ships is about to leave for Hawaii, Hiroto's brother Kōta wants Nā-san to be with him. Kirari agrees to let Nā-san stay for three days. However, Kōta really sees Naa-san as a best friend.
41	"Aoi! Kirari!! Babān and Special Stage"; Transliteration: "Aoi! Kirari!! Babān to Supesharu Sutēji" (Japanese: あおい!きらり!!ババーンとスペシャルステージ)	January 19, 2007
Aoi and Kirari perform on stage together to promote a new Rainbow Cosmetic, but Higarasyima tries to mess it up.
42	"Pink! Transform into EatRanger!"; Transliteration: "Pinku!! Henshin Kirarin Taberunjā!" (Japanese: ピンク!!変身きらりんタベルンジャー!)	January 26, 2007
Kirari accidentally injures a performer playing "Pink" in EatRanger. To help out in EatRanger shows for little kids, Kirari takes her spot and dresses up as Pink. With such little experience, she accidentally ruins the show.
43	"Crab! Arashi's Aqua Illusion!!"; Transliteration: "Kanī! Arashi no Akua Iryūjon!!" (Japanese: カニー!嵐のアクアイリュージョン!!)	February 2, 2007
Cappuccino, a famous water illusionist from Las Vegas impresses Kirari will all his visual tricks. He claims to hold the #1 title for best magicians. Arashi tries to challenge him with his fairytale performance of love.
44	"IQ! Kirari and Genius Quiz Battle!!"; Transliteration: "IQ! Kirari to Tensai Kuizu Batoru!!" (Japanese: IQ! きらりと天才クイズバトル!!)	February 9, 2007
Kirari and Erina enter a quiz show, where people's critical thinking and IQ are tested. Being confident that they will win the grand prize, a 7-year-old genius, Rizuko-chan, continuously answers all of the questions correctly, beating out other competitors.
45	"It's a Miracle! Nā-san Circus!!"; Transliteration: "Mirakuru! Nā-san Sākasu!!" (Japanese: ミラクル!なーさんサーカス!!)	February 16, 2007
When Nā-san was invited as a guest for a miracle circus, the ringmaster was proud to meet Na-san, but becomes depressed when his animals do not show interest in Nā-san. After seeing Na-san's acts, the animals leave the circus then Kirari and Na-san convince the animals to return.
46	"Kame-sān! Will Ships Disband!?"; Transliteration: "Kame-san! Ships ga Kaisan!?" (Japanese: カメさ〜ん!SHIPSが解散!?)	February 23, 2007
Seiji accidentally pulls down Hiroto's shorts and Hiroto accidentally spills soda over Seiji's pet Kame-san. These two induce an argument, forcing them to split apart. Kirari has to do something to bring them back together.
47	"Image Change! Here I Come, Erina, the Student Gang Leader!!"; Transliteration: "Imechen! Sukeban Erina Sanjō!!" (Japanese: イメチェン!スケバンエリナ参上!!)	March 2, 2007
Erina finds methods to impress everyone over Kirari. The media concur Kirari being one of the most popular idols. Challenging Kirari to difficult events such diving off a high location, Erina hopes Kirari will lose in favor of her.
48	"Kirari and Akane!? A Splendid Showdown!!"; Transliteration: "Kirari to Akane!? Karē naru Taiketsu!!" (Japanese: きらりとあかね!?カレーなる対決!!)	March 9, 2007
Kirari, Akane, and Aoi are chosen as candidates for the idol queen.
49	"Catch! Perform a Galaxy Dance Splendidly!?"; Transliteration: "Kyācchi! Kirari to Kimero Gyarakushī Dansu!?" (Japanese: キャ〜ッチ!キラリとキメろギャラクシーダンス!?)	March 16, 2007
Akane framed Kirari and the news about it spread quickly.
50	"Nationwide Tour! Love Burning in a Snowy Land!?"; Transliteration: "Zenkoku Tsuā! Yuki no Daichi ni Moeru Koi!?" (Japanese: 全国ツアー!雪の大地に燃える恋!?)	March 23, 2007
With Akane withdrawing from the idol queen, Aoi and Kirari are working to win that title through concerts. Higashiyama, angry at Akane's withdrawal, decides to take revenge on Kirari by cancelling one of her concerts.
51	"Shine! The Diamond Idol Queen!!"; Transliteration: "Kagayake! Daiyamondo Aidoru Kuīn!!" (Japanese: 輝け!ダイヤモンドアイドルクイーン!!)	March 30, 2007
Kirari's rankings are still far behind from Aoi, her idol queen opponent. She tries to promote her image to everyone all around the country through interviews, concerts, and Live TV. Kirari and Aoi then compete one-on-one at the final idol queen competition.
52	"Play Ball! Kirari Raises the Curtain, Season-opening ceremony!" Transliteration: "Purei Bōru!! Kirari Kaimaku ☆ Shikyūshiki!" (Japanese: プレイボール!!きらり開幕☆始球式!)	April 6, 2007
Kirari learns how to play baseball.
53	"Hello, Welcome to Kirarin Cafe"; Transliteration: "Irassyaimase ☆ Kirarin Cafe e Yōkoso♥" (Japanese: いらっしゃいませ☆きらりんカフェへようこそ♥)	April 13, 2007
Kirari's father opens up a new cafe using her name. While everyone enjoys Kirari's father's entries, Roccomari, a famous French food critic, gives a low grade. Kirari's father looks for the best ingredients and perfects the ultimate taste for Roccomari.
54	"Myū: Naa in Love!? Kirari Duels!!"; Transliteration: "Myū♥Nā·Koi!? Kirari Kettō!!" (Japanese: ミュウ♥なー·恋!?キラリ決闘!!)	April 20, 2007
Na-san saves Myu-san from a group of bullies. Myu-san falls in love with Na-san and tries to convince him to be with her. However, Na-san refuses as he is loyal to Kirari. Kirari thinks of a great idea, a relay course between Myu-san and Kirari.
55	"Unbelievable! Mushroom in Manga Training!?"; Transliteration: "Arienasū! Manga Shugyō de Kinoko!?" (Japanese: アリエナス〜!まんが修行でキノコ〜!?)	April 27, 2007
Seeing that Fubuki published her own manga, Kirari decides to do it too by visiting Himiko Saotome. Being tired, Himiko Saotome rushes to complete her manga just in time for the Ships concert. She needs every help she can to bring her next manga to completion.
56	"Kiss! Hiroto × Izumi "Declaration of Lover!?""; Transliteration: "Kisu! Hiroto × Izumi "Koibito Sengen!?"" (Japanese: Kiss! 宙人×いずみ「恋人宣言!?」)	May 4, 2007
Izumi, recently hired by Higashiyama, suddenly kisses Hiroto in front of a big crowd during a relay competition. Kirari is heartbroken, thinking that Izumi and Hiroto have both committed love. To make matters worse, the media about this kissing event spreads very quickly.
57	"Yoka! A Tearful Scoop at a Triangle Battle!?"; Transliteration: "Yoka! Sankaku Batoru de Namida no Sukūpu!?" (Japanese: よかっ!三角バトルで涙のスクープ!?)	May 11, 2007
Izumi finds every method to cheat by intentionally hurting Kirari as they complete as pastry chefs. Meanwhile, tabloid reporters are capturing illegal photos and spreading reports about the triangle battle between Hiroto, Kirari, and Izumi.
58	"Clouds of Steam! The Mission to Guard Hiroto!!"; Transliteration: "Yukemuri! Hiroto o Mamore Daisakusen!!" (Japanese: ユケムリ〜!宙人を守れ大作戦!!)	May 18, 2007
Izumi and Hiroto now star in a new drama. Kirari spies on them, ensuring that Izumi does not go overboard with Hiroto. After failing to find a place to live, Kirari suddenly meets an old lady, who lets her stay for the night and invites her to a kimono competition. Izumi, rivaling Kirari, will enter the competition as well.
59	"Wha!? A Miracle of a Girl in Yukata!"; Transliteration: "Hyō!? Yukata-Musume no Kiseki!" (Japanese: ヒョー!?浴衣娘のキ·セ·キ!)	May 25, 2007
As the kimono competition begins, Izumi steals a marker and doodles all over Kirari's kimono, ruining her entry. Although Kirari was able to make a new submission, both Izumi and Kirari's entry becomes overshadowed by Fubuki's entry. Izumi becomes infuriated and chases Fubuki only to reveal her true identity: Hyõtarõ, a guy who Hiroto vowed to form an idol unit with until he moved away.
60	"To Outer Space! Kirari in the End of the Earth"; Transliteration: "Uchū e! Chikyū Saigo no Kirari☆" (Japanese: 宇宙へ!地球最期のキラリ☆)	June 1, 2007
The world is coming to an end and only Kirari can save the world with her voice. Erina joins in unexpectedly.
61	"Revolution!! A Flower Clock of A Girl and Kirari"; Transliteration: "Reboryūshon!! Shōjo to Kirari no Hana-Dokei" (Japanese: レボリューション!!少女ときらりの花時計)	June 8, 2007
While Kirari discusses a new drama she has been cast in with her family, a boy comes into Kirarin Cafe and passes out. Once the boy wakes up, he tells Kirari about how his younger sister, a musician with respiratory disease, is in the hospital and wants Kirari to visit her.
62	"Hikaru, a Cocky Candidate for Idol!"; Transliteration: "Hikaru, Namaiki Aidoru Kōhosei!" (Japanese: ひかる☆なまいきアイドル候補生!)	June 15, 2007
Kirari meets a new idol girl named Hikaru, but they got off on the wrong foot.
63	"Strain! Kirari and Hikaru's First Stage!!"; Transliteration: "Do-Kinchō! Kirari to Hikaru Hatsu Sutēji!!" (Japanese: どキンチョー! キラリと光る初ステージ!!)	June 22, 2007
Hikaru will be performing on stage, but has a nervous case of stage fright. Kirari needs to help Hikaru in time for the show.
64	"Smash! A Victory Pair Hoo?"; Transliteration: "Sumasshu! Bikutorī Pea da·fū?" (Japanese: スマッシュ! ビクトリーペアだ·フゥー?)	June 29, 2007
A familiar cat comes back from Na-san's graduation, and holds a severe grudge against him.
65	"Kira Pika in a Pinch!? The two of them are NS!!"; Transliteration: "Kira Pika Pīnchi!? Futari wa NS!!" (Japanese: きら☆ぴか♪ピーンチ!? ふたりはNS!!)	July 6, 2007
Hikaru experiences what Kirari's stardom life is like.
66	"Shoot! I Wish Fan Letters Would Touch Her Heart!!"; Transliteration: "Shūto! Hāto ni Todoke Fan Retā!!" (Japanese: シュート! ハートに届けファンレター!!)	July 13, 2007
A childhood friendship between Hikaru and a boy begins to crumble as both put each other aside to pursue their individual dreams.
67	"Audition! Our Rival is Supernova!!"; Transliteration: "Ōdishon! Raibaru wa Sūpānova!!" (Japanese: オーディション! ライバルはスーパーノヴァ!!)	July 20, 2007
Kira Pika does an audition for a movie, with their rival being a new idol group known as Supernova.
68	"Horror! Specter Buster is at Work!"; Transliteration: "Horā! Yōkai Basutā Shutsudō Chū!" (Japanese: ホラ〜ッ! 妖怪バスター出動チュー!)	July 27, 2007
Kirari and Hikaru star as superheroes in a new horror movie. Meanwhile, Muranishi's manager thinks he has been cursed from trying to renovate the office. Kirari and Hikaru decide to intervene.
69	"Hi!! Comedy Competition, Why!?"; Transliteration: "Dōmō!! Owarai Taikai Nande-yanen!?" (Japanese: ど〜も〜!! お笑い大会·なんでやね〜ん!?)	August 3, 2007
As a comedy competition is coming up for idols, Arashi shows up and puts Kirari and Hikaru through harsh training.
70	"Kirarin Cologne! May I be Happy?"; Transliteration: "Kirarin☆Koron! Happī Kamōn?" (Japanese: きらりん☆コロン! ハッピーかも〜ん?)	August 10, 2007
Kirari and Hikaru want to create their own perfume, but they cannot come up with any good ideas.
71	"Summer! Swimsuit! All-star Cast"; Transliteration: "Natsu da! Mizugi da! Nishi mo Higasi mo Oru sutā" (Japanese: 夏だ! 水着だ! 西も東もオールスター)	August 17, 2007
The Muranishi crew goes to Crescent Island for a day at the beach, and the Higashiyama crew shows up at the same time. While the idols unwind and Kumoi and Higashiyama's director fight over Muranishi director's attention, a secret island appears.
72	"Check! Kirari and Hikaru Coordinate Clothes?"; Transliteration: "Chēkku! Kirari to Hikaru ga Kōdenēto?" (Japanese: チェーック! きらりとひかるがこうでねぇと?)	August 24, 2007
Kirari and Hikaru are going to be starting their new clothes line called Double Crescent. However, they can't seem to come up with any good fashion ideas.
73	"Quaver! Lost Double Crescent!?"; Transliteration: "Wanawanā! "Ushi"nawareta Daburu Kuressento!?" (Japanese: ワナワナ〜! ウシなわれたダブルクレッセント!?)	August 31, 2007
Kirari and Hikaru work together in a department store to help designing for their clothing line. However, every match they come up with does not work out with the customers.
74	"Musical Outburst! Lose Weight!!"; Transliteration: "Mūjikaru♪ Hādo na Bakuhatsu! Yaserupiā!!" (Japanese: ミュージカル♪ ハードなバクハツ! ヤセルピアー!!)	September 7, 2007
Kirari and Hikaru are going to be in a musical, but Kirari loses her focus from only thinking of food.
75	"Twinkle! Hikaru On Stage!"; Transliteration: "Kirān! Hikaru On Sutēji!" (Japanese: キラーン! ひかる☆オンステージ!)	September 14, 2007
Supernova is desperately trying to ruin the sisterly relationship between Kirari and Hikaru as an important concert is only days away.
76	"Dark Trap that Tears Kira Pika Apart!?"; Transliteration: "Kira☆Pika Futari o Hikisaku Kuroi Wana!?" (Japanese: きら☆ぴか 二人を引き裂く黒いワナ!?)	September 21, 2007
After many days of perseverance, Supernova finally tears Kira Pika apart.
77	"Forever, Kira Pika Last Concert"; Transliteration: "Fōebā Kira Pika Rasuto Konsāto" (Japanese: フォーエバー♪ きら☆ぴかラストコンサート♪♪)	September 28, 2007
With an emotionally distressed Hikaru on the sidelines, Kirari must figure out how to end Kira Pika's stardom with a bang.
78	"Ships vs. GEPS"; Transliteration: "SHIPS vs. GEPS Dansu Batoru" (Japanese: SHIPS vs GEPS ダンスバトル)	October 5, 2007
Tina comes to Japan with the duo GEPS, who teach Hiroto the true meaning of dance.
79	"Ships Disbands!? Goodbye Hiroto..."; Transliteration: "Ships Kaisan!? Goodbye Hiroto..." (Japanese: SHIPS解散!? グッバイヒロト...)	October 12, 2007
With the fall of Ships, Hiroto is leaving to New York to study. Kirari becomes lonely and she does not know what to do.
80	"Uh-huh!? Mushroom Ambassador and Happy My Take!!"; Transliteration: "Sō Nandā!? Kinoko Taishi de Happī Maitake!!" (Japanese: ソーナンダー!? きのこ大使でハッピーまいたけ!!)	October 19, 2007
Kirari's mushroom theme is all the rage in Japan.
81	"SOS! Nā-san Robot is Magnum-force!!"; Transliteration: "SOS! Nā-san Robo wa Saikyō nano resu!!" (Japanese: SOS! なーさんロボは最強なのレス!!)	October 26, 2007
Na-san has a robotic toy made just like him.
82	"Seiji Secretly Pursues Solo Work!!"; Transliteration: "Seiji Sorōri Soro Katsudō!!" (Japanese: Seiji☆そろ〜りソロ活動!!)	November 2, 2007
Hiroto is in New York while Seiji remains in Japan. Muranishi's director asks Seiji if he would like pursue a solo career, but Seiji doesn't want to sing without Hiroto. Meanwhile, Kirari helps to design male clothes and she asks Seiji to be her model.
83	"Twins! Flying Muscles!"; Transliteration: "Tsuinzu! Tonde Massuru! Nabe Tabe-massuru!!" (Japanese: ツインズ!飛んでマッスル!鍋食べマッスル!!)	November 9, 2007
Supernova, now without interference from Kira Pika, is trying to find a new athletic trainer, but Supernova has been turned down by all the trainers they come up with.
84	"Confess Your Heart! Erina Falling Love!"; Transliteration: "Kokuri-makure! Erina Fōrin Rabu!" (Japanese: 告りまくれ!エリナフォーリンラブ!)	November 16, 2007
Erina falls in love with Kirari's brother, Subaru, but she is not sure how to impress him.
85	"Crane and Tortoise! Kirari and Seiji Get Married Suddenly!?"; Transliteration: "Tsuru Kame! Kirari to Seiji ga Dengeki Kekkon!?" (Japanese: ツルカメ!きらりと星司が電撃結婚!?)	November 23, 2007
Seiji's parents originally never wanted Seiji to be an idol. One day, they draw the line by severing their consent, telling Seiji has to come home and get married. Seiji must introduce a girl to his parents if he is going to save his career, and that girl is revealed to be Kirari.
86	"Black Ambition! Blackwood Starts Up"; Transliteration: "Kuroki Yabō! Burakku uddo Shidō" (Japanese: 黒き野望! ブラックウッド始動)	November 30, 2007
Blackwood becomes a popular idol company, and many idols decide to be sponsored by it.
87	"Black Revolution! Crisis in the Muranishi Company"; Transliteration: "Kuroki Kakumei! Muranishi Jimusho no Kiki!!" (Japanese: 黒き革命! 村西事務所の危機!!)	December 7, 2007
Blackwood is having a great start, but there is trouble ahead.
88	"Black Moon!? Mysterious Girl Debut!!"; Transliteration: "Burakku Mūn!? Nazo no Shōjo Debyū!!" (Japanese: ブラックムーン!?ナゾの少女デビュー!!)	December 14, 2007
The director of Blackwood threatens Kirari to join his company or else he will ruin her careers and everyone around her.
89	"Kirari Saw a Tea! Black Secret!"; Transliteration: "Ocha Kumi Kirari wa Mita! Kuroki Himitsu!!" (Japanese: お茶くみきらりは見た!黒き秘密!!)	December 21, 2007
In response to Kirari standing up to Blackwood's manager, he pulls the company's sponsorship. Now Kirari must continue her idol career without credibility or sponsorship.
90	Transliteration: "Kuro Fesu! Sutēji no Kirari Dai Shūgou!!" (Japanese: 黒フェス! ステージにきらりん 大集合!!)	December 28, 2007
Hiroto returns from New York and becomes a member of Ships with Seiji again, and Kirari is accepted back into Muranishi with open arms.
91	"First Date: Kirarin Collection"; Transliteration: "Fāsuto Deito: Kirarin Korekushon" (Japanese: ファーストデート☆きらりんコレクション)	January 11, 2008
Hiroto and Seiji both ask Kirari out on a date, but she is followed by two tabloid reporters and both of her dates are featured in a magazine.
92	"Shakin'! Kirari × Charismatic Beautician"; Transliteration: "Shakin! Kirari × Karisuma Biyō-Shi" (Japanese: シャキン!きらり×カリスマ 美容師)	January 18, 2008
Kirari meets a hairdresser with very bizarre methods. When she arranges Na-san like a moikan, Kirari decides to challenge the hairdresser.
93	"Aoi Idol Graduation"; Transliteration: "Aidoru Aoi Guradyuēshon" (Japanese: アイドルあおい♪グラデュエーション♪♪)	January 25, 2008
Aoi states she is retiring as an idol, and she receives an explosive goodbye from her idol friends.
94	"Jump Around! Kirarin on Ice!!"; Transliteration: "Tonde Mawatte! Kirarin on Aisu!!" (Japanese: 跳んで 回って!きらりん onアイス!!)	February 1, 2008
Kirari and the other idols will make a show on ice, but Kirari cannot skate.
95	"Stuck to 24 Hours Idol's Secret!!"; Transliteration: "Micchaku 24 Jikan Aidoru no Himitsu!!" (Japanese: 密着24時間 アイドルのヒミツ!!)	February 8, 2008
A likeable reporter will pass a day with Kirari to admire her style of life, and is about to learn that the idol life has less perks than the tabloids appeal to others.
96	"Princess Kirari!! A Big Adventure in a Bachelor Game"; Transliteration: "Kirari Hime!! Bācharu Geimu de Daibōken Nano Resu" (Japanese: きらり姫!! バーチャルゲームで大冒険なのレス)	February 15, 2008
Kirari and Ships will enter a video game, but a glitch runs amok endangering them all.
97	"Hollywood! Actress Luna Visit Japan!!"; Transliteration: "Hariuddo! Joyū Runa Rainichi!!" (Japanese: ハリウッド! 女優ルナ来日!!)	February 22, 2008
An actress named Luna comes to Japan from America.
98	"Does It Really Exist? Lucasberg Audition"; Transliteration: "Sonna no Ari? Rukasubāgu Ōdishon" (Japanese: そんなのあり? ルカスバーグオーディション)	February 29, 2008
All of the top idols are invited to do an audition.
99	"Luna and Kirari's Shy Date!!"; Transliteration: "Runa to Kirari Hanikami Dēto!!" (Japanese: ルナときらり☆ハニカミデート!!)	March 7, 2008
Luna spends the day with Kirari and her manager then later goes out with Kirari to an amusement park. Meanwhile, Kirari's mother in the Tsukishima family portrait looks very familiar, and she soon realizes that Luna is her mom.
100	"Start Filming! A Miraculous Meeting Between Naomi and Sakurako"; Transliteration: "Kurankuin! Naomi to Sakurako Kiseki no Deai" (Japanese: クランクイン! ナオミと桜子 奇跡の出会い)	March 14, 2008
Kirari and Luna film a movie on an island.
101	"Mom...! Crank up the Tears"; Transliteration: "Mama...! Namida no Kurankuappu" (Japanese: ママ...! 涙のクランクアップ)	March 21, 2008
Luna tells Kirari that she is her mother.
102	"Kirarin Farewell Concert!?"; Transliteration: "Kirarin Sayonara Konsāto!?" (Japanese: きらりん☆サヨナラコンサート!?)	March 28, 2008
Emotionally damaged from Luna's confession, Kirari starts her farewell concert.

== Home release ==
Volume Number	Publish Date
STAGE1	2006-09-08
Contains episodes 01–04
STAGE2	2006-10-06
Contains episodes 05–08
STAGE3	2006-11-10
Contains episodes 09–12
STAGE4	2006-12-08
Contains episodes 13–16
STAGE5	2007-01-12
Contains episodes 17–20
STAGE6	2007-02-09
Contains episodes 21–24
STAGE7	2007-03-09
Contains episodes 25–28
STAGE8	2007-04-04
Contains episodes 29–32
STAGE9	2007-05-10
Contains episodes 33–36
STAGE10	2007-06-08
Contains episodes 37–40
STAGE11	2007-07-06
Contains episodes 41–44
STAGE12	2007-08-10
Contains episodes 45–48
STAGE13	2007-09-07
Contains episodes 49–51
2nd Tour STAGE1	2007-10-03
Contains episodes 52–55
