= Koero! Rakuten Eagles =

Single by Cute
- Released: March 30, 2008
- Recorded: 2008
- Genre: J-pop
- Length: 7:35
- Label: Zetima
- Songwriter: Tsunku
- Producer: Tsunku

Cute singles chronology
"La La La Shiawase no Uta" (2008)	"Koero! Rakuten Eagles" (2008)	"Namida no Iro" (2008)

Music video
- "Koero! Rakuten Eagles (Cute Ver.)" on YouTube

"Koero! Rakuten Eagles" (越えろ!楽天イーグルス, Koero! Rakuten Īgurusu) is a single by J-pop group Cute. From March 20, the single was sold exclusively in the Rakuten Eagles official web store, appearing later also in the Hello! Project Official Shop. It was only available for purchase during the official Hello! Project tour in 2008.

== Background ==
"Koero! Rakuten Eagles" was the fourth official cheer song of the professional baseball team Tohoku Rakuten Golden Eagles. In the past few years, Hello! Project had annually issued official fight songs for the team. In the 2008 season, it was Cute who were chosen to record a new song. The lively upbeat number contained a powerful message, inspiring players.

== Track listing ==
All tracks are written by Tsunku.

No.	Title	Length
1.	"Koero! Rakuten Eagles" (越えろ!楽天イーグルス)
2.	"Koero! Rakuten Eagles (Instrumental)" (越えろ!楽天イーグルス（Instrumental）)
