= Arihara =

Arihara (written: 有原) is a Japanese surname. Notable people with the surname include:

- Kanna Arihara (有原 栞菜, born 1993), Japanese pop singer and former member of Cute
- Kohei Arihara (有原 航平, born 1992), Japanese professional baseball player
