= Hae Otoko =

1993 song by Chisato Moritaka

Single by Chisato Moritaka

from the album Lucky 7
- Language: Japanese
- English title: Fly Man
- A-side: "Memories (Single Version)"
- Released: June 25, 1993
- Recorded: 1993
- Genre: J-pop; pop rock
- Length: 3:56
- Label: Warner Music Japan
- Songwriter: Chisato Moritaka
- Producer: Yukio Seto

Chisato Moritaka singles chronology
"Watashi no Natsu" (1993)	"Hae Otoko" / "Memories" (1993)	"Kaze ni Fukarete" (1993)

Music video
- Hae Otoko on YouTube

"Hae Otoko" (ハエ男; lit. "Fly Man") is the 19th single by Japanese singer/songwriter Chisato Moritaka. Written by Moritaka, the single was released with "Memories" by Warner Music Japan on June 25, 1993. Both songs were used in the Fuji TV variety show Utchan Nanchan no Yarunara Yaraneba! (ウッチャンナンチャンのやるならやらねば!; If Uchan Nanchan Does It, We Have to Do It!).

== Music video ==
The music video is a parody of Alien films, with Moritaka playing a soldier frantically running away from a giant alien in an abandoned building. Towards the end of the video, she realizes that the alien is a giant fly and hits it with a fly swatter.

== Chart performance ==
"Hae Otoko"/"Memories" peaked at No. 12 on Oricon's singles chart. It was also certified Gold by the RIAJ.

== Other versions ==
Moritaka re-recorded the song and uploaded the video on her YouTube channel on February 21, 2015. This version is also included in Moritaka's 2015 self-covers DVD album Love Vol. 9.

== Track listing ==
All lyrics are written by Chisato Moritaka.

8 cm CD
No.	Title	Music	Arrangement	Length
1.	"Hae Otoko (Single Version)" (Hae Otoko (Shinguru Vājon) (ハエ男 (シングル･ヴァージョン); "Fly Man (Single Version)"))	Moritaka	Moritaka	3:56
2.	"Memories (Single Version)" (Memorīzu (Shinguru Vājon) (Memories (シングル･ヴァージョン)))	Hideo Saitō	Saitō	5:17

== Personnel ==
- Chisato Moritaka – vocals, drums, piano
- Yuichi Takahashi – guitar
- Eiji Ogata – guitar
- Yukio Seto – bass
- Shin Hashimoto – piano
- Hideo Saitō – guitar, synthesizer

== Charts ==
Chart (1993)	Peak position
Japanese Oricon Singles Chart	12

== Certification ==
Region	Certification	Certified units/sales
Japan (RIAJ)	Gold	200,000^{^}
^{^} Shipments figures based on certification alone.

== Cover versions ==
- Cute covered "Hae Otoko" in the Limited Edition C & D versions of their 2013 single "Kono Machi".
