= 2 Mini: Ikiru to Iu Chikara =

2007 album by C-ute

2 Mini Ikiru to Iu Chikara
- Regular Edition

EP by Cute
- Released: 18 April 2007 (JP)
- Genre: J-pop
- Label: Zetima
- Producer: Tsunku

Cute chronology
Cutie Queen Vol. 1 (2006)	2 Mini Ikiru to Iu Chikara (2007)	3rd: Love Escalation! (2008)

2 Mini: Ikiru to Iu Chikara (②mini〜生きるという力〜; lit. '2 Mini: The Power That You Live') is the second album from the J-pop girl group C-ute released on 18 April 2007 on the Zetima label. Although it is actually a mini-album, containing only five tracks, it is considered their second album. The album was released in two versions: Regular Edition and Limited Edition, the latter containing also a DVD with videos.

The album debuted at number 21 in the Oricon Weekly Albums Chart, remaining in the chart for two weeks.

== Track listing ==
All songs written and composed by Tsunku.

CD

1. "That's the Power"
2. "Bokura no Kagayaki" (僕らの輝き; Our Radiance) – Erika Umeda, Chisato Okai, and Kanna Arihara
3. "Disco Queen" (ディスコクイーン, Disuko Kuīn) – Saki Nakajima and Mai Hagiwara
4. "Tsūgaku Vector" (通学ベクトル, Tsūgaku Bekutoru; Commuting Vector) – Airi Suzuki
5. "Natsu Doki Lipstick" (夏Doki リップスティック, Natsu Doki Rippusutikku; Summer Heartbeating Lipstick) – Maimi Yajima

Limited Edition DVD

1. "Jump" (Close-up Live Ver. at Nippon Seinenkan; from "C-ute Debut Tandoku Concert 2007 Haru: Hajimatta yo! Cutie Show")
2. Jacket Satsuei Making (ジャケット撮影メイキング, Jaketto Satsuei Meikingu; lit. 'Jacket Photography Making')

== Charts ==
Chart (2007)	Peak position	Weeks on chart	Sales	
Chart (2007)	Peak position	Weeks on chart	First week	Total
Japan (Oricon Weekly Albums Chart)	21	2	7,991	9,388
