= Chō Happy Song =

- Regular Edition cover

Single by Berryz Kobo × Cute
- Released: April 28, 2012 (download); June 20, 2012 (CD single)
- Genre: J-pop, pop
- Label: Zetima
- Songwriter: Tsunku
- Producer: Tsunku

Berryz Kobo × Cute singles chronology
"Amazuppai Haru ni Sakura Saku" (2011)	"Chō Happy Song" (2012)

Berryz Kobo singles chronology
""Be Genki (Naseba Naru!)"" (2012)	""Cha Cha Sing"" (2012)

Cute singles chronology
""Kimi wa Jitensha Watashi wa Densha de Kitaku"" (2012)	""Aitai Aitai Aitai na"" (2012)

Music videos
- Chō Happy Song on YouTube

Alternative cover
- Limited Edition A cover

Professional ratings
Review scores
Source	Rating
Billboard Japan	Favorable

"Chō Happy Song" (超HAPPY SONG; "Superhappy Song") is the 2nd single by Berryz Kobo × Cute (pronounced Berikyū), a collaboration unit between the Japanese idol groups Berryz Kobo and Cute. The single was first released for paid download on April 28, 2012; the CD single was released on June 20, 2012.

== Background ==
The title song is a mix of two previously published songs, Berryz Kobo's "Because Happiness" and Cute's "Shiawase no Tochū" from their 2012 albums. Both tracks were intentionally composed and produced by Tsunku to form a new song when played simultaneously. The trick was originally scheduled to be announced at a summer Hello! Project concert, but was uncovered by fans in mid-April. The song became a hot topic on the Internet, and a set of the three tracks, "Because Happiness", "Shiawase no Tochū ", and "Chō Happy Song", was hastily released as a digital download single on April 28.

The CD single will be released on June 20. It will contain a new arrangement version of the title track. The CD single will be available in 5 versions: a Regular Edition and Limited Editions A, B, C, and D. The Limited Editions A and B will include a bonus DVD; all the other editions will be CD-only. As usual, all the limited editions will be shipped sealed and will contain a serial-numbered entry card for the lottery to win a ticket to one of the single's launch events.

== Track listing ==
All songs written and composed by Tsunku.

=== Regular Edition, Limited Editions A, B ===
CD
No.	Title	Artists(s)	Length
1.	"Chō Happy Song (Single Ver.)" (超HAPPY SONG（シングルVer.）)
2.	"Chō Happy Song" (超HAPPY SONG)
3.	"Because Happiness" (Because happiness)	Berryz Kobo
4.	"Shiawase no Tochū" (幸せの途中, "On the Road to Happiness")	Cute
5.	"Chō Happy Song (Single Ver.) (Instrumental)" (超HAPPY SONG（シングルVer.）＜Instrumental＞)
6.	"Chō Happy Song (Single Ver. Berryz Kobo vo. yori) (Instrumental)" (超HAPPY SONG（シングルVer. Berryz工房 vo.入り）＜Instrumental＞)
7.	"Chō Happy Song (Single Ver. Cute vo. yori) (Instrumental)" (超HAPPY SONG（シングルVer. °C-ute vo.入り）＜Instrumental＞)

Limited Edition A DVD
No.	Title	Length
1.	"Berryz Kobo "Because Happiness" + Cute "Shiawase no Tochū" mix edit video" (Berryz工房「Because happiness」（4/29中野サンプラザ公演映像）+°C-ute「幸せの途中」（5/4中野サンプラザ公演映像）のMIX編集映像)

Limited Edition B DVD
No.	Title	Length
1.	"Berryz Kobo "Because Happiness" + Cute "Shiawase no Tochū" double screen video" (Berryz工房「Because happiness」（4/29中野サンプラザ公演映像）+°C-ute「幸せの途中」（5/4中野サンプラザ公演映像）のダブル画面映像)

=== Limited Edition C ===
CD
No.	Title	Artists(s)	Length
1.	"Chō Happy Song (Single Ver.)" (超HAPPY SONG（シングルVer.）)
2.	"Chō Happy Song" (超HAPPY SONG)
3.	"Because Happiness" (Because happiness)	Berryz Kobo
4.	"Shiawase no Tochū" (幸せの途中)	Berryz Kobo
5.	"Chō Happy Song (Single Ver.) (Instrumental)" (超HAPPY SONG（シングルVer.）＜Instrumental＞)
6.	"Chō Happy Song (Single Ver. Berryz Kobo vo. yori) (Instrumental)" (超HAPPY SONG（シングルVer. Berryz工房 vo.入り）＜Instrumental＞)
7.	"Chō Happy Song (Single Ver. Cute vo. yori) (Instrumental)" (超HAPPY SONG（シングルVer. °C-ute vo.入り）＜Instrumental＞)

=== Limited Edition D ===
CD
No.	Title	Artists(s)	Length
1.	"Chō Happy Song (Single Ver.)" (超HAPPY SONG（シングルVer.）)
2.	"Chō Happy Song" (超HAPPY SONG)
3.	"Because Happiness" (Because happiness)	Cute
4.	"Shiawase no Tochū" (幸せの途中)	Cute
5.	"Chō Happy Song (Single Ver.) (Instrumental)" (超HAPPY SONG（シングルVer.）＜Instrumental＞)
6.	"Chō Happy Song (Single Ver. Berryz Kobo vo. yori) (Instrumental)" (超HAPPY SONG（シングルVer. Berryz工房 vo.入り）＜Instrumental＞)
7.	"Chō Happy Song (Single Ver. Cute vo. yori) (Instrumental)" (超HAPPY SONG（シングルVer. °C-ute vo.入り）＜Instrumental＞)

== Charts ==
Chart (2011)	Peak position		
Chart (2011)	Peak position	Oricon Daily Singles Chart	2
Oricon Weekly Singles Chart	3		
Oricon Monthly Singles Chart	11		
Billboard Japan Hot 100	26		
Billboard Japan Hot Top Airplay	92		
Billboard Japan Hot Singles Sales	5		
