= Naze Hito wa Arasou n' Darō? / Summer Wind / Jinsei wa Step! =

Single by Cute
- A-side: "Naze Hito wa Arasou n' Darō?"; "Summer Wind"; "Jinsei wa Step!"
- Released: April 20, 2016 (Japan)
- Label: Zetima

Cute singles chronology
"Arigatō (Mugen no Yell) / Arashi o Okosunda Exciting Fight!" (2015)	"Naze Hito wa Arasou n' Darō? / Summer Wind / Jinsei wa Step!" (2016)	"Mugen Climax / Ai wa Marude Seidenki / Singing (Ano Koro no Yō ni)" (2016)

Music video
- "Naze Hito wa Arasou n' Darō?" "Summer Wind" "Jinsei wa Step!" on YouTube

"Naze Hito wa Arasou n' Darō? / Summer Wind / Jinsei wa Step!" (何故 人は争うんだろう？／Summer Wind／人生はSTEP！) is the 29th single by the Japanese female idol group Cute. It was released in Japan on April 20, 2016, on the Zetima label.

== Release ==
It is a triple-A-sided single.

It was released in six versions: three limited ones (limited editions A, B, and C) and three regular ones (regular editions A, B, and C). All the regular editions were CD-only, while all the limited editions included an additional DVD.

== Reception ==
The physical CD single debuted at number 2 on the Oricon daily singles chart.

On the Oricon weekly singles chart, it debuted also at number 2.

== Track listing ==
=== CD (all editions) ===
CD
No.	Title	Length
1.	"Naze Hito wa Arasou n' Darō?" (何故 人は争うんだろう？)	4:21
2.	"Summer Wind"	4:33
3.	"Jinsei wa Step!" (人生はSTEP)	4:08
4.	"Naze Hito wa Arasou n' Darō?" (Instrumental)	4:21
5.	"Summer Wind" (Instrumental)	4:33
6.	"Jinsei wa Step!" (Instrumental)	4:08

DVD (Limited Edition A only)
No.	Title	Length
1.	"Naze Hito wa Arasou n' Darō? (Music Video)"	5:56

DVD (Limited Edition B only)
No.	Title	Length
1.	"Summer Wind (Music Video)"	5:08

DVD (Limited Edition C only)
No.	Title	Length
1.	"Jinsei wa Step! (Music Video)"	6:16

== Charts ==
Chart (2016)	Peak position
Oricon Weekly Singles Chart	2
