= 8 Queen of J-pop =

8 Queen of J-Pop
- Regular Edition cover

Studio album by Cute
- Released: 4 September 2013 (JP)
- Genre: J-pop
- Label: Zetima
- Producer: Tsunku

Cute chronology
2 Cute Shinseinaru Best Album (2013)	8 Queen of J-Pop (2013)	°Cmaj9 (2015)

Singles from ⑧ Queen of J-POP
- 1. "Aitai Aitai Aitai na" Released: 5 September 2012; 2. "Kono Machi" Released: 6 February 2013; 3. "Crazy Kanzen na Otona" Released: 3 April 2013; 4. "Kanashiki Amefuri / Adam to Eve no Dilemma" Released: 10 July 2013

Music video
- Cute "Bagel ni Ham & Cheese" (MV)

8 Queen of J-pop (⑧ Queen of J-POP) is the 8th studio album by Cute. It was released on 4 September 2013 in 3 editions: regular edition and 2 limited editions.

== Track listing ==
=== CD ===
1. "Bagel ni Ham & Cheese" (ベーグルにハム&チーズ; "Ham & Cheese Bagel")
2. "Namida mo Denai Kanashiku mo Nai Nan ni mo Shitakunai" (涙も出ない 悲しくもない なんにもしたくない; "I'm Not Crying, I'm Not Sad, I Don't Want to Do Anything")
3. "Kanashiki Amefuri" (悲しき雨降り; "Sad Rainfall")
4. "Tadori Tsuita Onna Senshi" (たどり着いた女戦士; "Struggling Female Warriors")
5. "Crazy Kanzen na Otona" (Crazy 完全な大人; "A Crazy, Perfect Adult")
6. "Nichiyōbi wa Daisuki yo" (日曜日は大好きよ; "I Love Sundays")
7. "Abiru Hodo Ai o Kudasai" (浴びる程の愛をください)
8. "Aitai Aitai Aitai na" (会いたい 会いたい 会いたいな; "I Want, I Want, I Want to Meet You")
9. "Adam to Eve no Dilemma" (アダムとイブのジレンマ; "Adam and Eve's Dilemma")
10. "Watashi ga Honki o Dasu Yoru" (私が本気を出す夜; "The Night I Went All Out")
11. "Kono Machi" (この街; "This Town")

=== Limited Edition A DVD ===
- Excerpt from Cute Concert Tour 2013 Haru ~Treasure Box~

=== Limited Edition B DVD ===
1. "Bagel ni Ham & Cheese" (Music Video)
2. "Crazy Kanzen na Otona" (Crazy Dance Ver.)
3. Album making-of and commentary

== Featured members ==
- Maimi Yajima
- Saki Nakajima
- Airi Suzuki
- Chisato Okai
- Mai Hagiwara

== Song information ==
1. "Bagel ni Ham & Cheese"
  - Lyrics & composition: Tsunku
  - Arrangement: Shoichiro Hirata
  - Center vocal: Airi Suzuki
2. "Namida mo Denai Kanashiku mo Nai Nan ni mo Shitakunai"
  - Lyrics & composition: Tsunku
  - Arrangement: AKIRA
  - Center vocal: Mai Hagiwara
3. "Kanashiki Amefuri"
4. "Tadori Tsuita Onna Senshi"
  - Lyrics & composition: Tsunku
  - Arrangement: Kaoru Okubo
5. "Crazy Kanzen na Otona"
6. "Nichiyōbi wa Daisuki yo"
  - Lyrics & composition: Tsunku
  - Arrangement: Keiichi Kondo
  - Center vocal: Maimi Yajima
7. "Abiru Hodo Ai o Kudasai"
  - Lyrics & composition: Tsunku
  - Arrangement: Jun Yamazaki
  - Center vocal: Chisato Okai
8. "Aitai Aitai Aitai na"
9. "Adam to Eve no Dilemma"
10. "Watashi ga Honki o Dasu Yoru"
  - Lyrics & composition: Tsunku
  - Arrangement: Masanori Takumi
  - Center vocal: Saki Nakajima
11. "Kono Machi"

== Charts ==
Chart (2013)	Peak position
Oricon Daily Albums Chart	5
Oricon Weekly Albums Chart	6
