= 4 Akogare My Star =

- Cover of the limited edition release

Studio album by Cute
- Released: 28 January 2009 (JP)
- Genre: J-pop
- Label: Zetima
- Producer: Tsunku

Cute chronology
3rd: Love Escalation! (2008)	4 Akogare My Star (2009)	Cute Nandesu! Zen Single Atsumechaimashita! 1 (2009)

Singles from 4 Akogare My Star
- 1. "Namida no Iro" Released: 23 April 2008; 2. "Edo no Temari Uta II" Released: 30 July 2008; 3. "Forever Love" Released: 26 November 2008

4 Akogare My Star (④ 憧れ My STAR, Yon Akogare Mai Sutā) is the fourth album by the J-pop idol group Cute, released on 28 January 2009 in a limited-edition version and a regular-edition version. The album's track list features eleven songs, including three single releases: "Namida no Iro", "Forever Love", and "Edo no Temari Uta II".

The album debuted at number 13 in the Oricon Weekly Albums Chart, remaining in the chart for 3 weeks. It is the last album to feature Erika Umeda and Kanna Arihara.

== Track listing ==
1. "Akogare My Star" (★憧れ My STAR★; "Longing My Star")
2. "One's Life"
  - Performed by Erika Umeda, Chisato Okai, and Mai Hagiwara
3. "Yes! All My Family"
  - Performed by Airi Suzuki
4. "Namida no Iro" (涙の色; "The Colour of Tears")
5. "Aishiteru Aishiteru" (愛してる 愛してる; "I Love You I Love You")
  - Performed by Saki Nakajima and Kanna Arihara
6. "Seishun Song" (青春ソング; "Song of Youth")
  - Performed by Maimi Yajima
7. "Big Dreams"
8. "Shines"
9. "Yakusoku wa Toku ni Shinai wa" (約束は特にしないわ)
10. "Forever Love"
11. "Edo no Temari Uta II" (江戸の手毬唄 II; "Edo Handball Song II")

== Charts ==
Chart (2008)	Peak position	Weeks on chart	Sales	
Chart (2008)	Peak position	Weeks on chart	First week	Total
Japan (Oricon Daily Albums Chart)	5			
Japan (Oricon Weekly Albums Chart)	13	3	11,327	13,724
