= Aitai Aitai Aitai na =

- Regular Edition cover

Single by Cute

from the album 8 Queen of J-pop
- B-side: "Kanashiki Heaven" (Regular, Limited A); "Saikō Music" (Limited B–D)
- Released: September 5, 2012 (Japan)
- Genre: J-pop
- Label: Zetima
- Songwriter: Tsunku
- Producer: Tsunku

Cute singles chronology
"Kimi wa Jitensha Watashi wa Densha de Kitaku" (2012)	"Aitai Aitai Aitai na" (2012)	"Kono Machi" (2013)

Berryz Kobo×Cute singles chronology
""Chō Happy Song"" (2012)

Music videos
- Aitai Aitai Aitai na on YouTube
- Aitai Aitai Aitai na (Dance Shot Ver.) on YouTube
- Aitai Aitai Aitai na (Close-up Ver.) on YouTube
- Aitai Aitai Aitai na (Live Back Shot Ver.) on YouTube
- Kanashiki Heaven (910 Live Ver.) on YouTube

Alternative cover
- Limited Edition A cover

Professional ratings
Review scores
Source	Rating
Billboard Japan	Favorable

"Aitai Aitai Aitai na" (会いたい 会いたい 会いたいな) is the 19th major single by the Japanese idol group Cute, set for release in Japan on September 5, 2012.

== Background ==
The song "Aitai Aitai Aitai na" was premiered at the first concert of the Hello! Project 15th Anniversary Live 2012 Summer tour, on July 21 at the Onyx Theater in Osaka. The single will be released in five versions: Regular Edition and Limited Editions A, B, C, and D. The Regular Edition and the Limited Edition D are CD-only. The Limited Editions A, B, and C include a DVD. All the limited editions are shipped sealed and include a serial-numbered entry card for the lottery to win a ticket to one of the single's launch events.

== Chart performance ==
The single debuted at number 3 in the daily Oricon chart.

== Track listing ==
=== Regular Edition, Limited Edition A ===
CD
No.	Title	Length
1.	"Aitai Aitai Aitai na" (会いたい 会いたい 会いたいな)
2.	"Kanashiki Heaven" (悲しきヘブン)
3.	"Aitai Aitai Aitai na (Instrumental)" (会いたい 会いたい 会いたいな（Instrumental）)

Limited Edition A DVD
No.	Title	Length
1.	"Aitai Aitai Aitai na (Dance Shot Ver.)" (会いたい 会いたい 会いたいな（Dance Shot Ver.）)

=== Limited Editions B, C, D ===
CD
No.	Title	Length
1.	"Aitai Aitai Aitai na" (会いたい 会いたい 会いたいな)
2.	"Saikō Music" (最高ミュージック)
3.	"Aitai Aitai Aitai na (Instrumental)" (会いたい 会いたい 会いたいな（Instrumental）)

Limited Edition B DVD
No.	Title	Length
1.	"Aitai Aitai Aitai na (Close-up Ver.)" (会いたい 会いたい 会いたいな（Close-up Ver.）)

Limited Edition C DVD
No.	Title	Length
1.	"Shinkyoku Hatsuhirō Document" (新曲初披露ドキュメント, "New song premiere documentary")

=== Bonus ===
Sealed into all the limited editions:

- Event ticket lottery card with a serial number

== Charts ==
Chart (2012)	Peak position
Oricon Daily Singles Chart	3
Oricon Weekly Singles Chart	4
Oricon Monthly Singles Chart	10
Billboard Japan Hot 100	13
Billboard Japan Hot Top Airplay	81
Billboard Japan Hot Singles Sales	6
