= Mugen Climax / Ai wa Marude Seidenki / Singing (Ano Koro no Yō ni) =

Single by Cute
- A-side: "Mugen Climax"; "Ai wa Marude Seidenki"; "Singing (Ano Koro no Yō ni)"
- Released: November 2, 2016 (Japan)
- Genre: J-pop; electropop
- Label: Zetima

Cute singles chronology
"Naze Hito wa Arasou n' Darō? / Summer Wind / Jinsei wa Step!" (2015)	"Mugen Climax / Ai wa Marude Seidenki / Singing (Ano Koro no Yō ni)" (2016)	"To Tomorrow / Final Squall / The Curtain Rises" (2017)

Music video
- "Mugen Climax" "Ai wa Marude Seidenki" "Jinsei wa Step!" on YouTube

"Mugen Climax / Ai wa Marude Seidenki / Singing (Ano Koro no Yō ni)!" (夢幻クライマックス／愛はまるで静電気／Singing～あの頃のように～) is the 30th single by the Japanese female idol group Cute. It was released in Japan on November 2, 2016, on the Zetima label.

== Release ==
It is a triple-A-sided single.

It was released in six versions: three limited ones (limited editions A, B, and C) and three regular ones (regular editions A, B, and C). All the regular editions were CD-only, while all the limited editions included an additional DVD.

== Reception ==
The physical CD single debuted at number 2 on the Oricon daily singles chart. On the Oricon weekly singles chart, it debuted also at number 2.

== Track listing ==
=== CD (all editions) ===
CD
No.	Title	Length
1.	"Mugen Climax" (夢幻クライマックス)	4:01
2.	"Ai wa Marude Seidenki" (愛はまるで静電気)	4:17
3.	"Singing (Ano Koro no Yō ni)" (Singing～あの頃のように～)	4:29
4.	"Mugen Climax" (Instrumental)	4:01
5.	"Ai wa Marude Seidenki" (Instrumental)	4:17
6.	"Singing (Ano Koro no Yō ni)" (Instrumental)	4:29

DVD (Limited Edition A only)
No.	Title	Length
1.	"Mugen Climax (Music Video)"	4:29

DVD (Limited Edition B only)
No.	Title	Length
1.	"Ai wa Marude Seidenki (Music Video)"	5:01

DVD (Limited Edition C only)
No.	Title	Length
1.	"Singing (Ano Koro no Yō ni) (Music Video)"	5:30

== Charts ==
Chart (2016)	Peak position
Japan (Oricon Weekly): The CD single	2
Japan (Billboard Japan Hot 100): The first track "Mugen Climax"	2
