= Kanashiki Amefuri / Adam to Eve no Dilemma =

- Regular Edition A cover

Single by Cute

from the album 8 Queen of J-pop
- B-side: "Dare ni mo Naishō no Koishite Iru no" (Regular A, Limited A, B, C Ed.); "Attakai Ude de Tsutsunde "; (Regular B, Limited D)
- Released: July 10, 2013 (Japan)
- Genre: J-pop; EDM; electronica
- Label: Zetima
- Songwriter: Tsunku
- Producer: Tsunku

Cute singles chronology
"Crazy Kanzen na Otona" (2013)	"Kanashiki Amefuri / Adam to Eve no Dilemma" (2013)	"Tokai no Hitorigurashi / Aitte Motto Zanshin" (2013)

Music videos
- Kanashiki Amefuri on YouTube
- Adam to Eve no Dilemma on YouTube

"Kanashiki Amefuri / Adam to Eve no Dilemma" (悲しき雨降り／アダムとイブのジレンマ) is the 22nd major single by the Japanese female idol group Cute. It was released in Japan on July 10, 2013.

== Background ==
Both title songs are bittersweet adult-like shōwa era-like songs that were arranged into upbeat dance numbers.

The single will be released in six versions: Limited Editions A, B, C, D and Regiular Editions A, B. The Regular Editions and the Limited Edition D are CD-only. The limited editions A, B, and C include a DVD. All the limited editions are shipped sealed and include a serial-numbered entry card for the lottery to win a ticket to one of the single's launch events.

== Track listing ==
=== Regular Edition A, Limited Editions A, B, C ===
CD
No.	Title	Length
1.	"Kanashiki Amefuri" (悲しき雨降り)
2.	"Adam to Eve no Dilemma" (アダムとイブのジレンマ)
3.	"Dare ni mo Naishō no Koishite Iru no" (誰にも内緒の恋しているの)
4.	"Kanashiki Amefuri (Instrumental)" (悲しき雨降り（Instrumental）)
5.	"Adam to Eve no Dilemma (Instrumental)" (アダムとイブのジレンマ（Instrumental）)

Limited Edition A DVD
No.	Title	Length
1.	"Kanashiki Amefuri (Music Video)" (悲しき雨降り（Music Video）)	04:45
2.	"Kanashiki Amefuri (Dance Shot Ver.)" (悲しき雨降り（Dance Shot Ver.）)	04:45

Limited Edition B DVD
No.	Title	Length
1.	"Adam to Eve no Dilemma (Music Video)" (アダムとイブのジレンマ（Music Video）)	04:34
2.	"Adam to Eve no Dilemma (Dance Shot Ver.)" (アダムとイブのジレンマ（Dance Shot Ver.）)	04:35

Limited Edition C DVD
No.	Title	Length
1.	"Kanashiki Amefuri (Close-up Ver.)" (悲しき雨降り（Close-up Ver.）)	04:39
2.	"Adam to Eve no Dilemma (Close-up Ver.)" (アダムとイブのジレンマ（Close-up Ver.）)	04:35
3.	"Kanashiki Amefuri (Another Edition)" (悲しき雨降り（Another Edition）)	04:39
4.	"Adam to Eve no Dilemma (Special Comment Video)" (アダムとイブのジレンマ（スペシャルコメント映像）)	10:18

=== Regular Edition B, Limited Edition D ===
CD
No.	Title	Length
1.	"Kanashiki Amefuri" (悲しき雨降り)
2.	"Adam to Eve no Dilemma" (アダムとイブのジレンマ)
3.	"Attakai Ude de Tsutsunde" (あったかい腕で包んで)
4.	"Kanashiki Amefuri (Instrumental)" (悲しき雨降り（Instrumental）)
5.	"Adam to Eve no Dilemma (Instrumental)" (アダムとイブのジレンマ（Instrumental）)

=== Bonus ===
Sealed into all the limited editions:

- Event ticket lottery card with a serial number

== Charts ==
Chart (2013)	Peak position
Oricon Daily Singles Chart	2
Oricon Weekly Singles Chart	4

- First week sales according to Oricon: 60,592 copies
