= To Tomorrow / Final Squall / The Curtain Rises =

Single by Cute
- A-side: "To Tomorrow"; "Final Squall"; "The Curtain Rises"
- Released: March 29, 2017 (Japan)
- Genre: J-pop
- Label: Zetima

Cute singles chronology
"Mugen Climax / Ai wa Marude Seidenki / Singing (Ano Koro no Yō ni)" (2016)	"To Tomorrow / Final Squall / The Curtain Rises" (2017)

"To Tomorrow / Final Squall / The Curtain Rises" is the 31st single by the Japanese female group Cute released on March 29, 2017, on the Zetima label.

It was Cute's final single, as the group disbanded in the summer of 2017.

== Background ==
The single was announced on January 5, 2017, at the group's New Year's Concert at Nakano Sun Plaza. At the concert it was announced that the single would be released on March 22.

On January 30, the Hello! Project official website posted an announcement that the release date would be postponed "due to production circumstances". This alerted the group's fans and aroused speculations about whether the single would be released.

== Release ==
The album was released in seven versions: four limited and three regular editions. All the regular editions will be CD-only, while all the limited editions included an additional DVD.

== Track listing ==
=== CD (all editions) ===
CD
No.	Title	Lyrics	Music	Length
1.	"To Tomorrow"	Tsunku	Tsunku	4:08
2.	"Final Squall" (ファイナルスコール)	Shock Eye	Shock Eye	4:35
3.	"The Curtain Rises"	Tsunku (rap arrangement by U.M.E.D.Y.)	Tsunku	4:08
4.	"To Tomorrow" (Instrumental)			4:08
5.	"Final Squall" (Instrumental)			4:35
6.	"The Curtain Rises" (Instrumental)			4:08

DVD (Limited Edition A only)
No.	Title	Length
1.	"To Tomorrow (Music Video)"	5:14

DVD (Limited Edition B only)
No.	Title	Length
1.	"Final Squall (Music Video)"	5:30

DVD (Limited Edition C only)
No.	Title	Length
1.	"The Curtain Rises (Music Video)"	4:43

DVD (Limited Edition SP only)
No.	Title	Length
1.	"To Tomorrow (Dance Shot Ver.)"	4:16
2.	"Final Squall (Dance Shot Ver.)"	4:41
3.	"The Curtain Rises (Dance Shot Ver.)"	4:14

== Charts ==
Chart (2012)	Peak position
Japan (Oricon Weekly Singles Chart)	2
Japan (Oricon Daily Singles Chart)	2
