= Kimi wa Jitensha Watashi wa Densha de Kitaku =

- Regular Edition cover

Single by Cute

from the album 2 Cute Shinseinaru Best Album
- B-side: "Ai wa Itsumo Itsumo"
- Released: April 18, 2012 (Japan)
- Genre: J-pop
- Label: Zetima
- Songwriter: Tsunku
- Producer: Tsunku

Cute singles chronology
"Sekaiichi Happy na Onna no Ko" (2011)	"Kimi wa Jitensha Watashi wa Densha de Kitaku" (2012)	"Aitai Aitai Aitai na" (2012)

Berryz Kobo×Cute singles chronology
"Amazuppai Haru ni Sakura Saku" (2011)	"Chō Happy Song" (2012)

Hello! Project Mobekimasu singles chronology
"Busu ni Naranai Tetsugaku" (2011)

Music videos
- Kimi wa Jitensha Watashi wa Densha de Kitaku on YouTube
- Kimi wa Jitensha Watashi wa Densha de Kitaku (all versions playlist) playlist on YouTube

Alternative cover
- Limited Edition A cover

"Kimi wa Jitensha Watashi wa Densha de Kitaku" (君は自転車 私は電車で帰宅; "You go home by bicycle, I by train") is the 18th major single by the Japanese idol group Cute, was released in Japan on April 18, 2012. It is Cute's first ballad single.

== Background ==
The abbreviated title for the song is "Kimi Chari". It was made so that it would not be necessary to repeat the entire title, "Kimi wa Jitensha Watashi wa Densha de Kitaku", every time it was mentioned.

== Release information ==
The single was released in seven versions: Regular Edition (catalog number EPCE-5870), and Limited Editions A, B, C, D, E, and F. All versions except the Limited Edition A are CD-only. The Limited Edition A includes a DVD with a special version of the music video for the title song. The Limited Editions B to F each contain an additional track, a solo version of the title song performed by a Cute's member. All the limited editions are shipped sealed and include a serial-numbered entry card for the lottery to win a ticket to one of the single's launch events.

== Composition ==
According to Tsunku, Cute's musical producer and author of the song, "Kimi wa Jitensha Watashi wa Densha de Kitaku" is a rock ballad with very simple, yet powerful arrangement. The concept is simplicity. It is a band sound with piercing vocals and the guitar phrases and distorted organ sounds that stick into your mind.

Concerning the lyrics, in his blog Tsunku wrote that the girl who sings the song is worried as if she and the boy will never see each other again, but he thinks that they will certainly meet the next day at school.

== Music video ==
The music video for the title track was shot at the Ajigaura train station. The video was published on Cute's official YouTube channel on March 13, 2012 (Japan Standard Time). As Airi Suzuki noted, in the music video the band tried to reproduce the story told in the song's lyrics like in a TV drama. There also were 30 additional versions of the music video produced. They were published one per day on Cute's YouTube channel, starting April 1.

== Promotion ==
The single's April 21 release event at Ikebukuro Sunshine City's Fountain Square featured baseball player Yu Darvish, who wore a baseball uniform with the number 18 instead of 11 (his number in Texas Rangers) to celebrate Cute's 18th single.

== Cover versions ==
The song "Kimi wa Jitensha Watashi wa Densha de Kitaku" was covered by the fellow Hello! Project group S/mileage on their single "Suki yo, Junjō Hankōki", which was released on August 22, 2012. The S/mileage version was used as a theme song in Kaidan Shin Mimibukuro Igyō, a movie starring S/mileage members that came out on August 11 in the same year.

== Track listing ==
Regular Edition, Limited Edition A
No.	Title	Length
1.	"Kimi wa Jitensha Watashi wa Densha de Kitaku" (君は自転車 私は電車で帰宅)
2.	"Ai wa Itsumo Itsumo" (愛はいつもいつも)
3.	"Kimi wa Jitensha Watashi wa Densha de Kitaku (Instrumental)" (君は自転車 私は電車で帰宅（Instrumental）)

Limited Edition A DVD
No.	Title	Length
1.	"Kimi wa Jitensha Watashi wa Densha de Kitaku (Dance Shot Ver.)" (君は自転車 私は電車で帰宅（Dance Shot Ver.）)

Limited Edition B
No.	Title	Artist(s)	Length
1.	"Kimi wa Jitensha Watashi wa Densha de Kitaku" (君は自転車 私は電車で帰宅)	Cute
2.	"Ai wa Itsumo Itsumo" (愛はいつもいつも)	Cute
3.	"Kimi wa Jitensha Watashi wa Densha de Kitaku (Yajima Maimi Ver.)" (君は自転車 私は電車で帰宅（矢島舞美Ver.）)	Maimi Yajima (Cute)
4.	"Kimi wa Jitensha Watashi wa Densha de Kitaku (Instrumental)" (君は自転車 私は電車で帰宅（Instrumental）)

Limited Edition C
No.	Title	Artist(s)	Length
1.	"Kimi wa Jitensha Watashi wa Densha de Kitaku" (君は自転車 私は電車で帰宅)	Cute
2.	"Ai wa Itsumo Itsumo" (愛はいつもいつも)	Cute
3.	"Kimi wa Jitensha Watashi wa Densha de Kitaku (Nakajima Saki Ver.)" (君は自転車 私は電車で帰宅（中島早貴Ver.）)	Saki Nakajima (Cute)
4.	"Kimi wa Jitensha Watashi wa Densha de Kitaku (Instrumental)" (君は自転車 私は電車で帰宅（Instrumental）)

Limited Edition D
No.	Title	Artist(s)	Length
1.	"Kimi wa Jitensha Watashi wa Densha de Kitaku" (君は自転車 私は電車で帰宅)	Cute
2.	"Ai wa Itsumo Itsumo" (愛はいつもいつも)	Cute
3.	"Kimi wa Jitensha Watashi wa Densha de Kitaku (Suzuki Airi Ver.)" (君は自転車 私は電車で帰宅（鈴木愛理Ver.）)	Airi Suzuki (Cute)
4.	"Kimi wa Jitensha Watashi wa Densha de Kitaku (Instrumental)" (君は自転車 私は電車で帰宅（Instrumental）)

Limited Edition E
No.	Title	Artist(s)	Length
1.	"Kimi wa Jitensha Watashi wa Densha de Kitaku" (君は自転車 私は電車で帰宅)	Cute
2.	"Ai wa Itsumo Itsumo" (愛はいつもいつも)	Cute
3.	"Kimi wa Jitensha Watashi wa Densha de Kitaku (Okai Chisato Ver.)" (君は自転車 私は電車で帰宅（岡井千聖Ver.）)	Chisato Okai (Cute)
4.	"Kimi wa Jitensha Watashi wa Densha de Kitaku (Instrumental)" (君は自転車 私は電車で帰宅（Instrumental）)

Limited Edition F
No.	Title	Artist(s)	Length
1.	"Kimi wa Jitensha Watashi wa Densha de Kitaku" (君は自転車 私は電車で帰宅)	Cute
2.	"Ai wa Itsumo Itsumo" (愛はいつもいつも)	Cute
3.	"Kimi wa Jitensha Watashi wa Densha de Kitaku (Hagiwara Mai Ver.)" (君は自転車 私は電車で帰宅（萩原舞Ver.）)	Mai Hagiwara (Cute)
4.	"Kimi wa Jitensha Watashi wa Densha de Kitaku (Instrumental)" (君は自転車 私は電車で帰宅（Instrumental）)

=== Bonus ===
Sealed into all the limited editions:

- Event ticket lottery card with a serial number

== Charts ==
Chart (2011)	Peak position
Oricon Daily Singles Chart	2
Oricon Weekly Singles Chart	3
Oricon Monthly Singles Chart	11
Billboard Japan Hot 100	18
Billboard Japan Hot Top Airplay	42
Billboard Japan Hot Singles Sales	10
