= Crazy Kanzen na Otona =

- Regular Edition cover

Single by Cute

from the album 8 Queen of J-pop
- B-side: "The Treasure Box" (Regular, Limited A, B, C Editions); "Chikyū kara no Sanjūsō" (Limited D); "Watashi wa Tensai" (Limited E)
- Released: April 3, 2013 (Japan)
- Genre: J-pop; electropop; dance-pop
- Label: Zetima
- Songwriter: Tsunku
- Producer: Tsunku

Cute singles chronology
"Kono Machi" (2013)	"Crazy Kanzen na Otona" (2013)	"Kanashiki Amefuri / Adam to Eve no Dilemma" (2013)

Music video
- "Crazy Kanzen na Otona" on YouTube

Professional ratings
Review scores
Source	Rating
Billboard Japan	Favorable

"Crazy Kanzen na Otona" (Crazy 完全な大人) is the 21st major single by the Japanese female idol group Cute, released in Japan on April 3, 2013.

== Background ==
The title song was first performed live at a series of concerts called Hello! Project Haru no Dai Kansha Hinamatsuri Festival 2013, held on March 2 and 3, 2013.

The single will be released in six versions: Regular Edition and Limited Editions A, B, C, D, and E. The Regular Edition and the limited edition C, D, and E are CD-only. The limited editions A, B, and C include a DVD. All the limited editions are shipped sealed and include a serial-numbered entry card for the lottery to win a ticket to one of the single's launch events.

== Track listing ==
=== Limited Edition A ===
CD
No.	Title	Length
1.	"Crazy Kanzen na Otona" (Crazy 完全な大人)
2.	"The Treasure Box" (ザ☆トレジャーボックス)
3.	"Kanashiki Heaven (Suzuki Part Ver.)" (悲しきヘブン（鈴木パートVer.）)
4.	"Kanashiki Heaven (Okai Part Ver.)" (悲しきヘブン（岡井パートVer.）)
5.	"Crazy Kanzen na Otona (Instrumental)" (Crazy 完全な大人（Instrumental）)

Limited Edition A DVD
No.	Title	Length
1.	"Crazy Kanzen na Otona" (Crazy 完全な大人（Music Video）)
2.	"Kanashiki Heaven (Suzuki Part Ver.)" (悲しきヘブン（鈴木パートVer.）)
3.	"Kanashiki Heaven (Okai Part Ver.)" (悲しきヘブン（岡井パートVer.）)
4.	"Kanashiki Heaven (Instrumental)" (悲しきヘブン（Instrumental）)

=== Regular Edition, Limited Editions B, C ===
CD
No.	Title	Length
1.	"Crazy Kanzen na Otona" (Crazy 完全な大人)
2.	"The Treasure Box" (ザ☆トレジャーボックス)
3.	"Crazy Kanzen na Otona (Instrumental)" (Crazy 完全な大人（Instrumental）)

Limited Edition B DVD
No.	Title	Length
1.	"Crazy Kanzen na Otona" (Crazy 完全な大人（Music Video）)
2.	"Crazy Kanzen na Otona (Dance Commentary Video)" (Crazy 完全な大人（Dance Commentary Video）)
3.	"Crazy Kanzen na Otona (Dance Shot Ver.)" (Crazy 完全な大人（Dance Shot Ver.）)

Limited Edition C DVD
No.	Title	Length
1.	"Crazy Kanzen na Otona" (Crazy 完全な大人（Music Video）)
2.	"Crazy Kanzen na Otona (Close-up Ver.)" (Crazy 完全な大人（Close-up Ver.）)

=== Limited Edition D ===
CD
No.	Title	Artist(s)	Length
1.	"Crazy Kanzen na Otona" (Crazy 完全な大人)
2.	"Chikyū kara no Sanjūsō" (地球からの三重奏)	Maimi Yajima, Airi Suzuki, Chisato Okai
3.	"Crazy Kanzen na Otona (Instrumental)" (Crazy 完全な大人（Instrumental）)

=== Limited Edition E ===
CD
No.	Title	Artist(s)	Length
1.	"Crazy Kanzen na Otona" (Crazy 完全な大人)
2.	"Watashi wa Tensai" (私は天才)	Saki Nakajima, Mai Hagiwara
3.	"Crazy Kanzen na Otona (Instrumental)" (Crazy 完全な大人（Instrumental）)

=== Bonus ===
Sealed into all the limited editions:

- Event ticket lottery card with a serial number

== Charts ==
Chart (2013)	Peak position
Oricon Daily Singles Chart	2
Oricon Weekly Singles Chart	3
Oricon Monthly Singles Chart	14
Billboard Japan Hot 100	7
Billboard Japan Hot 100 Airplay	42
Billboard Japan Hot Singles Sales	3
Billboard Japan Adult Contemporary Airplay	43

- First week sales according to Oricon: 47,420 copies
