= Kono Machi =

1990 song by Chisato Moritaka

Song by Chisato Moritaka

from the album Kokon Tozai
- Language: Japanese
- English title: This Town
- Released: October 17, 1990
- Recorded: 1990
- Genre: J-pop; dance-pop
- Length: 4:35
- Label: Warner Pioneer
- Composer: Hideo Saitō
- Lyricist: Chisato Moritaka
- Producer: Yukio Seto

Music videos
- "Kono Machi" (Home Mix) on YouTube

"Kono Machi" (この街; lit. "This Town") is a song by Japanese singer/songwriter Chisato Moritaka, from her 1990 studio album Kokon Tozai. The lyrics were written by Moritaka and the music was composed by Hideo Saitō. The "Home Version" of the song was released as the double A-side of Moritaka's 1991 single "Benkyō no Uta". The song was used in a Glico Pocky commercial featuring Moritaka.

== Background ==
Moritaka wrote the song as an homage to her home town of Kumamoto; hence the use of the Kumamoto dialect in the lyrics. The song mentions the Tomari River (泊川, Tomarikawa), which is not in the Kumamoto Prefecture. During her 1998 Sava Sava tour, Moritaka explained that Tomari River is a reference to Tomari, Hokkaido, the hometown of songwriter and collaborator Yuichi Takahashi.

The song introduced the "Kono Machi wave", with Moritaka directing the audience to raise their right arms in a clockwise motion with their index fingers pointing upwards before waving them left to right. During the Kumamoto show of the Kono Machi Tour 2019, Kumamon made a guest appearance to do the "Kono Machi wave" with the crowd.

== Other versions ==
Aside from the album and Home Version mixes, a third version was included in the 1991 remix album The Moritaka.

Moritaka re-recorded the song and uploaded the video on her YouTube channel on November 1, 2013. This version is also included in Moritaka's 2014 self-covers DVD album Love Vol. 6.

== Cute version ==
"Kono Machi"
- Regular Edition cover

Single by Cute

from the album 8 Queen of J-pop
- Language: Japanese
- English title: This Town
- B-side: "Kono Machi (Dance Groove Ver.)" (Regular); "Ame" (Limited A, B); "Hae Otoko" (Limited C, D)
- Released: February 6, 2013 (Japan)
- Recorded: 2013
- Genre: J-pop
- Label: Zetima
- Composer: Hideo Saitō
- Lyricist: Chisato Moritaka
- Producer: Tsunku

Cute singles chronology
"Aitai Aitai Aitai na" (2012)	"Kono Machi" (2013)	"Crazy Kanzen na Otona" (2013)

Music videos
- "Kono Machi" on YouTube
- "Maimi Yajima (Cute) "Ame" (Close-up Ver.)" on YouTube

Professional ratings
Review scores
Source	Rating
Billboard Japan	Favorable

The Japanese female idol group Cute released their cover of "Kono Machi" as their 20th major single on February 6, 2013.

=== Background ===
The single was released in five versions: Regular Edition and Limited Editions A, B, C, and D. The Regular Edition and the limited edition B and D are CD-only. The limited editions A and C include a DVD and feature covers of other Moritaka songs. All the limited editions were shipped sealed and included a serial-numbered entry card for the lottery to win a ticket to one of the single's launch events.

=== Track listing ===
All lyrics are written by Chisato Moritaka.

==== Regular Edition ====
All music is composed by Hideo Saitō.

CD
No.	Title	Arrangement	Length
1.	"Kono Machi" ((この街; "This Town"))	Shōichirō Hirata	5:14
2.	"Kono Machi (Dance Groove Ver.)" (この街（Dance Groove Ver.）)	Hirata	3:53
3.	"Kono Machi (Instrumental)" (この街（Instrumental）)	Hirata

==== Limited Editions A, B ====
All music is composed by Hideo Saitō, except where indicated.

CD
No.	Title	Music	Arrangement	Length
1.	"Kono Machi" (この街)	Saitō	Hirata
2.	"Ame" ((雨; "Rain") (Vocals: Maimi Yajima))	Seiji Matsuura	Yūsuke Itagaki
3.	"Kono Machi (Instrumental)" (この街（Instrumental）)

Limited Edition A DVD
No.	Title	Length
1.	"Kono Machi (Another Ver.)" (この街（Another Edition）)
2.	"Kono Machi (Close-up Ver.)" (この街（Close-up Ver.）)

==== Limited Editions C, D ====
All music is composed by Hideo Saitō, except where indicated.

CD
No.	Title	Music	Arrangement	Length
1.	"Kono Machi" (この街)
2.	"Hae Otoko" ((ハエ男; "Fly Man"))	Chisato Moritaka	Yoshimasa Fujisawa
3.	"Kono Machi (Instrumental)" (この街（Instrumental）)

Limited Edition C DVD
No.	Title	Length
1.	"Kono Machi (Another Ver.)" (この街（Another Edition）)
2.	"Kono Machi (5shot Ver.)" (この街（5shot Ver.）)

==== Bonus ====
Sealed into all the limited editions:

- Event ticket lottery card with a serial number

=== Charts ===
Chart (2013)	Peak position
Oricon Daily Singles Chart	3
Oricon Weekly Singles Chart*	4
Oricon Monthly Singles Chart	17
Billboard Japan Hot 100	12
Billboard Japan Hot 100 Airplay	98
Billboard Japan Hot Singles Sales	4

* First week sales according to Oricon: 24,361 copies
