= Arigatō (Mugen no Yell) / Arashi o Okosunda Exciting Fight! =

Single by Cute
- A-side: "Arashi o Okosunda Exciting Fight!"; "Arigatō (Mugen no Yell)"
- Released: October 28, 2015 (Japan)
- Genre: J-pop
- Label: Zetima

Cute singles chronology
"The Middle Management (Josei Chūkan Kanrishoku) / Gamusha Life / Tsugi no Kado o Magare" (2014)	"Arigatō (Mugen no Yell) / Arashi o Okosunda Exciting Fight!" (2015)	"Naze Hito wa Arasou n' Darō? / Summer Wind / Jinsei wa Step!" (2016)

Music video
- "Arigatō (Mugen no Yell)" "Arashi o Okosunda Exciting Fight!" on YouTube

"Arigatō (Mugen no Yell) / Arashi o Okosunda Exciting Fight!" (ありがとう～無限のエール～／嵐を起こすんだ Exciting Fight！) is the 28th single by the Japanese female idol group Cute, released in Japan on October 28, 2015.

== Release ==
It is a double-A-sided single.

It was released in six versions: four limited ones (limited editions A, B, C, and D) and two regular ones (regular editions A and B). Both regular editions were CD-only, while all the limited editions included an additional DVD.

== Reception ==
The physical CD single debuted at number 2 in the Oricon daily singles chart.

In the Oricon weekly singles chart, it debuted also at number 2.

According to Oricon, it was the 87th most selling CD single of the whole year 2015 in Japan.

== Track listing ==
=== Limited Editions A and C, Regular Edition A ===
CD
No.	Title	Length
1.	"Arigatō (Mugen no Yell)" (ありがとう～無限のエール～)	4:52
2.	"Arashi o Okosunda Exciting Fight!" (ありがとう～無限のエール～／嵐を起こすんだ Exciting Fight！)	4:06
3.	"Arigatō (Mugen no Yell)" (Instrumental)	4:52
4.	"Arashi o Okosunda Exciting Fight!" (Instrumental)	4:06

DVD (Limited Edition A only)
No.	Title	Length
1.	"Arigatō (Mugen no Yell) (Music Video)"
2.	"Arigatō (Mugen no Yell) (Making-of)" (ありがとう～無限のエール～ メイキング映像)

DVD (Limited Edition C only)
No.	Title	Length
1.	"Arigatō (Mugen no Yell) (Close-up Ver.)"

=== Limited Editions B and D, Regular Edition B ===
CD
No.	Title	Length
1.	"Arashi o Okosunda Exciting Fight!" (ありがとう～無限のエール～／嵐を起こすんだ Exciting Fight！)	4:06
2.	"Arigatō (Mugen no Yell)" (ありがとう～無限のエール～)	4:52
3.	"Arashi o Okosunda Exciting Fight!" (Instrumental)	4:06
4.	"Arigatō (Mugen no Yell)" (Instrumental)	4:52

DVD (Limited Edition B only)
No.	Title	Length
1.	"Arashi o Okosunda Exciting Fight! (Music Video)"
2.	"Arashi o Okosunda Exciting Fight! (Making-of)" (ありがとう～無限のエール～ メイキング映像)

DVD (Limited Edition B only)
No.	Title	Length
1.	"Arashi o Okosunda Exciting Fight! (Dance Shot Ver.)"

== Charts ==
Chart (2015)	Peak position
Oricon Daily Singles Chart	2
Oricon Weekly Singles Chart	2
Oricon Monthly Singles Chart	9

=== Year-end charts ===
Chart (2015)	Peak position
Oricon Year-end Chart	87
