= Sakura Chirari =

Single by Cute

from the album 3rd: Love Escalation!
- Released: February 21, 2007 (JP)
- Genre: J-pop
- Length: 12:09
- Label: Zetima
- Songwriter: Tsunku
- Producer: Tsunku

Cute singles chronology
"Wakkyanai (Z)" (2006)	"Sakura Chirari" (2007)	"Meguru Koi no Kisetsu" (2007)

Music video
- "Sakura Chirari" on YouTube

"Sakura Chirari" (桜チラリ; Cherry blossoms, Glimpse) is the first major single from the Japanese pop group Cute, released on February 21, 2007 under the Zetima label. This single was the first debut single by a female idol group to enter the charts within the top five positions (reaching the number 3 spot on the daily chart, and number 5 on the weekly chart), and the youngest group to rank within the top 10.

The CD single appeared in two versions: Regular Edition and Limited Edition, the latter with an additional DVD. The first press of the limited edition contained an event ticket draw card with a serial number.

== Track listing ==
All tracks are written by Tsunku.

No.	Title	Length
1.	"Sakura Chirari" (桜チラリ)
2.	"Jump" (JUMP)
3.	"Sakura Chirari (Instrumental)" (桜チラリ（Instrumental）)

== Charts ==
Chart (2007)	Peak position	Weeks on chart
Oricon Weekly Singles Chart	5	3
