= Edo no Temari Uta II =

- Regular Edition cover

Single by Cute

from the album 4 Akogare My Star
- Released: July 30, 2008
- Recorded: 2008
- Genre: J-pop
- Length: 10:04
- Label: Zetima
- Songwriters: Osamu Yoshioka, Ryudo Uzaki
- Producer: Tsunku

Cute singles chronology
"Namida no Iro" (2008)	"Edo no Temari Uta II" (2008)	"Forever Love" (2008)

Music video
- "Edo no Temari Uta II" on YouTube

"Edo no Temari Uta II" (江戸の手毬唄II; "Edo Temari Song II") is the sixth major (eleventh overall) single from J-pop teen idol group Cute, released on July 30, 2008. It was released both as a normal edition and limited edition. The limited edition has eight interchangeable covers, and the first press of both versions contained a card with a serial number, used in the "lottery" promotional event. The single peaked at #5 on the Oricon Chart, lasting 4 weeks, whereas the Single V peaked at #21 and lasted 3 weeks. The song also ranked #200 in the overall 2008 charts.

The song supposedly tells the (rumored) story of the Great Fire of Meireki, also known as the "Furisode Fire". It was originally written for Hiroshi Itsuki, but when Tsunku heard it and enjoyed it he asked for permission for Cute to sing it instead, to which Hiroshi obliged.

At the end of 2008, for the song "Edo no Temari Uta II", which was chosen as one of the best works of the year, Cute was nominated for the main Japan Record Award but lost to Exile and had to be content with a Gold Award.

== Track listings ==
=== CD single ===
No.	Title	Writer(s)	Length
1.	"Edo no Temari Uta II" (江戸の手毬唄II, "Edo Temari Song II")	Lyrics: Osamu Yoshioka, Music: Ryudo Uzaki
2.	"Wasuretakunai Natsu"" (忘れたくない夏, "Unforgettable Summer")	Tsunku
3.	"Edo no Temari Uta II (Instrumental)" (江戸の手毬唄II（Instrumental）)

=== DVD single ===
1. "Edo no Temari Uta II" (江戸の手毬唄II)
  - Note: This is the PV of the song.
2. "Edo no Temari Uta II (Dance Shot Ver.)" (江戸の手毬唄II (Dance Shot Ver.))
3. "Jacket Satsuei Making" (ジャケット撮影 メイキング; "Jacket Photography - Making Of")

== Charts ==
Chart (2008)	Peak position
Oricon Daily Singles Chart	3
Oricon Weekly Singles Chart	5
Oricon Yearly Singles Chart	200
Billboard Japan Hot 100	23
Billboard Japan Hot Top Airplay	91
Billboard Japan Hot Singles Sales	8

== Awards ==
=== Japan Record Awards ===
The Japan Record Awards is a major music awards show held annually in Japan by the Japan Composer's Association.

Year	Nominee / work	Award	Result
2008	"Edo no Temari Uta II" / Cute	Gold Award	Won
2008	"Edo no Temari Uta II" / Cute	Grand Prix	Nominated

See also

- 50th Japan Record Awards
