= Kanna Arihara =

Japanese talent, actress and singer (born 1993)

- 有原 栞菜
- Born: June 15, 1993 (age 33); Yokohama, Kanagawa, Japan
- Other name: Kanna
- Occupations: singer; actress
- Years active: 2004–2009, 2010–present
- Musical career
- Genres: J-Pop
- Label: Zetima
- Formerly of: Cute; Hello! Pro Egg

Kanna Arihara (有原 栞菜, Arihara Kanna; born June 15, 1993), known professionally as Kanna (栞菜), is a Japanese talent, actress, and a former idol singer.

Arihara began her career as a trainee of the umbrella idol group Hello! Project and later debuted as a member of Cute in 2006. After departing from the group in 2009, she ventured into modeling and acting.

== Career ==
=== 2004-2009: Cute ===
Arihara was born in Yokohama, Kanagawa, and joined Hello! Project in 2004 as part of the Hello! Pro Egg. Then she joined Tomoiki Ki o Uetai from 2005 until 2006, where she moved on to the current group, Cute.

On February 26, 2009, Hello! Project announced that Arihara was having difficulty performing onstage due to having hallux valgus, or bunion deformity and would also be absent from more Hello! Project activities, including activities in Cute, while receiving treatment. During her hiatus, Hello! Project announced in July that she had left the group and would not be returning in the future.

=== 2010-present: Modeling and acting career ===
In 2010, Arihara returned to entertainment and was signed into a model/talent agency called Blue Rose. She soon departed from Blue Rose and signed with Toki Entertainment.

== Personal life ==
In 2008, the September issue of the tabloid magazine BUBKA reported that Arihara had gone on a date to see the movie Hana Yori Dango: Final with Ryosuke Hashimoto, a member of Johnny's Jr. This affected her image, as soon after the publication, at a Cute handshake meeting, some fans refused to shake Arihara's hand, making her cry in the middle of the event. Excite.co.jp linked this publication with Arihara's sudden departure from Cute. Hashimoto, on the other hand, despite rumors of an upcoming penitence, was promoted to A.B.C-Z shortly afterwards.

== Filmography ==
=== Television ===
Year	Title	Role	Network	Notes
2005-2006	Musume Dokyu!	Herself	TV Tokyo	Morning Musume's variety show
2007-2008	Haromoni@	Herself	TV Tokyo	Morning Musume's variety show
2008	Berikyū!	Herself	TV Tokyo	Berryz Kobo and Cute's variety show
2008	Yorosen!	Herself	TV Tokyo	Hello! Project's variety show
2009	Bijo Houdan	Herself	TV Tokyo	Hello! Project's variety show

=== Theater ===
Year	Title	Role	Notes
2007	Neruko wa Cute	Herself	Lead role
2008	Keitai Shōsetsuka	Herself	Lead role
