= Cute (Japanese group) =

Japanese female idol group

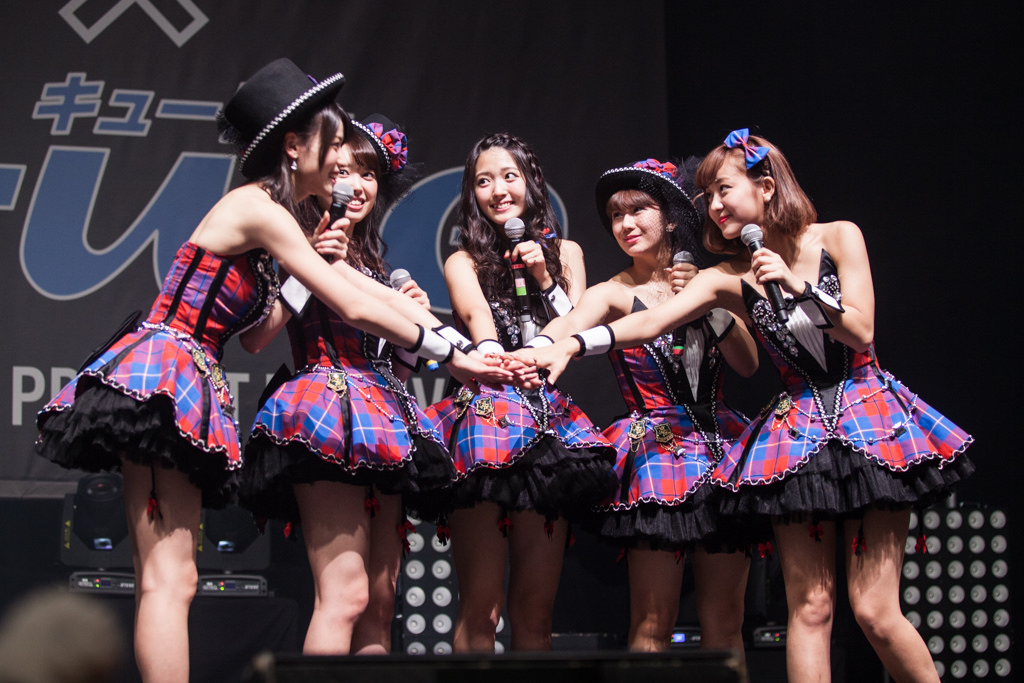
- Cute at Japan Expo 2014 (L to R): Yajima, Nakajima, Suzuki, Okai, Hagiwara

Background information
- Origin: Japan
- Genres: J-pop
- Years active: 2005–2017
- Label: Zetima
- Spinoffs: Buono!; Guardians 4
- Spinoff of: Hello! Project Kids
- Past members: Maimi Yajima; Saki Nakajima; Airi Suzuki; Chisato Okai; Mai Hagiwara; Megumi Murakami; Kanna Arihara; Erika Umeda
- Website: www.helloproject.com/c-ute/

Logo

Cute (キュート, Kyūto; stylized as °C-ute), was a Japanese girl group associated with Hello! Project and produced by Tsunku. Cute consisted of Maimi Yajima, Saki Nakajima, Airi Suzuki, Chisato Okai, and Mai Hagiwara, who were all members of Hello! Project Kids prior to the group's formation. The original member line-up also consisted of fellow Hello! Project Kids members Megumi Murakami and Erika Umeda, as well as Kanna Arihara (a member of Hello Pro Egg, Hello! Project's trainee group), prior to their departure.

After releasing a string of independent hits, Cute made its major debut in 2007 with "Sakura Chirari" and that year won the Japan Record Award for Best New Artist. In 2008, the group was nominated for the main Japan Record Award, the Grand Prix, its song being named one of the year's best songs. All of the group's major-label singles debuted in the top 10 of the Oricon Weekly Singles Chart.

== History ==
=== 2002–2004: Formation and pre-debut activities ===
The group's members were initially selected during the audition for Hello! Project Kids in 2002. They made appearances on Morning Musume's variety show, Hello! Morning, Mini-Moni's variety show, Hello Kids, and acted as back-up dancers in several Hello! Project acts. Later that year, Airi Suzuki and Mai Hagiwara appeared in Mini-Moni the Movie: Okashi na Daibōken!, while the rest of the members appeared in the film Koinu Dan no Monogatari.

In 2003, some Hello! Project Kids were placed in subgroups led by Morning Musume members: Suzuki was selected to be in Aa!, while Erika Umeda, Maimi Yajima, and Megumi Murakami were in the group called ZYX. Both units were short-lived, and their activity virtually came to a stall with the creation of Berryz Kobo in January 2004. When introducing Berryz Kobo at Nakano Sun Plaza on January 14, Tsunku intended to rotate all Hello! Project Kids through it, thus allowing them more time for school activities. Meanwhile, they continued to make appearances in television and theatre projects, such as Little Hospital, Promise Land: Clover no Daibōken, and Here's Love.

=== 2005–2006: Formation and indies debut ===
Instead of rotating the members in Berryz Kobo as Tsunku originally had intended, the remaining Hello! Project Kids who were not selected for Berryz Kobo became a new group altogether in 2005. Tsunku found it difficult to call the girls who were not part of Berryz Kobo collectively because they did not have a consistent group name, so he decided to name them. He chose "Cute" because its English meaning fit the image for the group. Wanting to somehow express the girls' overflowing fervor (enthusiasm), he substituted "°C" for "C". The creation of Cute was officially announced on June 11, 2005, though its formation had been rumored for several months prior. On January 2, 2006, at the first performance of the Hello! Project Winter 2006: Wonderful Hearts Concert Tour, Kanna Arihara, a Hello! Pro Egg member, was added to Cute.

On May 6, 2006, Cute released their debut single, "Massara Blue Jeans." From May 2006 to July 2006, they released four indie singles, "Oki na Ai de Motenashite", "Soku Dakishimete", and "Wakkyanai (Z)", all of which received limited distribution and were mostly sold at concerts. Despite this, their songs were featured in mainstream media, as "Oki na Ai de Motenashite" was used as the second ending theme to the anime Kirarin Revolution.

On October 31, 2006, Megumi Murakami left the group to concentrate on her studies.

=== 2007–2008: Major-label debut, 58th Kohaku Uta Gassen and the Japan Record Awards ===
On February 21, 2007, Cute's first official single "Sakura Chirari" was released. On the first day it ranked 3rd in the Oricon Daily Singles Chart. With their debut single, they became the youngest group (with the average age of 13) to rank in the top 10. On December 30, 2007, Cute received the Japan Record Award for Best New Artist. Tsunku accepted the award for them due to the members' age and child labor laws, as the ceremony was broadcast late at night. At the end of the year, Cute performed at the 58th NHK Kōhaku Uta Gassen with Morning Musume and Berryz Kobo.

At the end of 2008, Cute was nominated for the main Japan Record Award, the Grand Prix, for the song "Edo no Temari Uta II", but lost to Exile, instead earning the Gold Award, which is given to all main prize nominees. The song was originally written for veteran enka singer Hiroshi Itsuki, who was planning to release it on his end-of-2008 album. Tsunku, however, heard the song, and had wanted Cute to sing it as "a modern fairytale." For Cute, the song was rearranged from enka into boogie and the lyrics were slightly modified. Cute released the song on July 30, 2008.

=== 2009: Departure of Arihara and Umeda ===
On February 26, 2009, Hello! Project announced that Kanna Arihara was having difficulty performing on stage due to hallux valgus, or bunion deformity, and would not be able to attend Hello! Project 10th Anniversary fan club event that week. She would also be absent from Hello! Project's activities, including activities in Cute, while receiving treatment. Finally, in July 2009, Hello! Project informed that Arihara had decided to retire from the entertainment industry. On the other hand, Excite.co.jp linked Arihara's sudden departure to being caught on a date with Johnny's Jr. member Ryosuke Hashimoto in September 2008, which affected her image.

On August 1, 2009, Hello! Project posted Erika Umeda's official announcement that at the end of the upcoming Cute's 2009 fall concert tour she would be graduating from Cute and Hello! Project to begin a modeling career. Her graduation was held on October 25 in Osaka, at the last concert of the tour. The last single to feature her, "Everyday Zekkōchō!!" released on September 19, 2009, topped at number 1 in the Oricon daily singles chart and at number 2 in Oricon Weekly to become Cute's highest-ranking single to date. After her departure, the official group member colors were changed in November 2009.

=== 2010–2012: Expansion to iTunes and YouTube ===
On February 23, Cute released their 15th single, "Kiss Me Aishiteru". Cute's 16th single, "Momoiro Sparkling", debuted in 4th place of the Oricon daily singles chart for May 24. It spent two consecutive weeks in the Top 30 of the Oricon Weekly, ranking 6th and 17th.

On June 18, 2011, the concert from Cute Concert Tour 2011 Haru: Chō! Chō Wonderful Tour was broadcast live on the group's YouTube channel. The live stream attracted a large audience from all over the world. As it was reported in Cute's official blog by group leader Maimi Yajima and confirmed by the Up-Front Agency management on Twitter, the broadcast had been watched by a total of 93,144 viewers. On February 8, the group's 7th album, titled Dai Nana Shō 'Utsukushikutte Gomen ne', came out.

On April 8, Cute performed at the idol festival Idol Yokochō Matsuri, giving the first non-Hello! Project joint concert in their entire career. The music news provider BARKS praised the "power performance" that was "overwhelming from beginning to end" and demonstrated the "number one" group's unity out of the whole Hello! Project.

Cute's 18th single "Kimi wa Jitensha Watashi wa Densha de Kitaku" ("You ride your bicycle, while I catch the train home") was released on April 18. The music video for the song was uploaded on Cute's official YouTube channel on March 12. With more than 40,000 copies sold within the first week and reaching number 3 of the Oricon weekly singles chart, the single became their highest-selling single to date, breaking the record of their 3rd major single "Tokaikko Junjō".

On June 20, Cute released its second collaboration CD single with the fellow Hello! Project Kids group Berryz Kobo, named "Chō Happy Song" ("Superhappy Song.") The title tune is a mix of two previously published songs, Berryz Kobo's "Because Happiness" and Cute's "Shiawase no Tochū" ("On the Road to Happiness") from their 2012 albums. Both tracks were intentionally composed and produced by Tsunku to form a new song when played simultaneously. The trick was originally scheduled to be announced at a summer Hello! Project concert, but was uncovered by fans in mid-April. The song became a hot topic on the Internet, and a set of the three tracks, "Because Happiness," "Shiawase no Tochū," and "Chō Happy Song," was hastily released as a digital download single on April 28.

Also in June, it was announced that Cute's concert at the Yokosuka Arts Theater on June 30 would be broadcast live on YouTube.

On September 5, Cute released their 19th single, titled "Aitai Aitai Aitai na". The song premiered at the first concert of the Hello! Project 15th Anniversary Live 2012 Summer tour, on July 21 at the Onyx Theater in Osaka.

=== 2013–2015: Overseas events, Budokan concert, 10th anniversary ===
On April 3, it was announced that Cute would have their first solo overseas event, "Cutie Circuit ~Voyage a Paris~" on July 5 in Paris, France. In addition, they performed at Nippon Budokan for the first time on September 9 and 10 (Cute's day) to commemorate their 200th performance.

On January 26, 2014 at a release event, °Cute's 24th single titled "Kokoro no Sakebi o Uta ni Shitemita / Love Take It All", was announced to be released on March 5, in 5 editions. On February 24, it was announced that °Cute would be collaborating with Reebok to promote their product Your Reebok, where one could personally customize their Reebok, for March 2014. Both "Kokoro no Sakebi wo Uta ni Shitemita" and "Love take it all" were used for their collaboration "Your Reebok x °Cute."

On March 5, it was announced that °C-ute's "Love take it all" would be the inauguration CM song for 2014 BS-TBS' Idol Campaign. They would also have a 6-episode TV show called °Cute no Challenge TV, every last Thursday of the month on BS-TBS. On April 15 it was announced that Berryz Kobo and °Cute were invited to attend the 15th Japan Expo in Paris as Guests of Honor. On May 3, it was announced by Yajima Maimi, during the last MC corner of °Cute Concert Tour 2014 Haru ~Cute no Honne~, that Cute will be performing at Budokan on September 10, "°C-ute no Hi".

On July 16, °Cute released their 25th single "The Power / Kanashiki Heaven (Single Version)". On August 23 it was announced the °Cute had set two world records (the longest passing of an egg in a relay (1 hour and 30 minutes) and the most snacks eaten in a relay (1 hour). The records were achieved at a public recording of their TV-show with respectively 259 and 346 of their fans at Asakasa Blitz. On September 27, °Cute performed at the 2014 Aomori SHOCK ON open-air music festival alongside Berryz Kobo and other artists. On November 19, °Cute released their 26th single "I miss you / THE FUTURE". On November 20, °Cute performed alongside other artists at Tower Records' 35th anniversary event.

On April 1, 2015 Cute released their 27th single triple-A side single "The Middle Management ~Josei Chuukan Kanrishoku~ / Gamusha LIFE / Tsugi no Kado wo Magare" as part of their 10th anniversary commemoration. On June 11, °Cute performed their 10th anniversary concert at Yokohama Arena as part of their The Future Departure tour.

=== 2016–2017: Final years and disbandment ===
In 2014, prompted by Berryz Kobo's announcement to go on hiatus, discussions about Cute's future began privately among the members. In February 2016, the members of Cute discussed this again with their management, citing interest in other career paths. All members had the option of continuing as Cute outside of the Hello! Project name or to stay as Cute but suspend group activities. In the end, they ultimately decided to disband. Cute's disbandment plans for 2017 were made public on August 19, 2016 on their official Facebook account.

On November 2, Cute released their 30th single, "Mugen Climax / Ai wa Maru de Seidenki / Singing (Ano Koro no Yō ni)." They held their final concert on June 12, 2017 at Saitama Super Arena. Former members Megumi Murakami, Kanna Arihara, and Erika Umeda attended the concert, as well as other celebrities including Berryz Kobo (excluding Risako Sugaya), former Berryz Kobo member Maiha Ishimura, Momoiro Clover Z, Rino Sashihara, Yuki Kashiwagi, and Nicole Fujita. The concert was broadcast on multiple channels and also in Hong Kong and Taiwan.

== Members ==
- Maimi Yajima – leader
- Saki Nakajima
- Airi Suzuki
- Chisato Okai
- Mai Hagiwara

=== Former members ===
- Erika Umeda (left on October 25, 2009)
- Kanna Arihara (left in July 2009)
- Megumi Murakami (left on November 1, 2006)

== Artistry ==
=== Musical style and themes ===
Almost all the group's works are written and composed by Tsunku, the group's producer.

As of 2012, the group's image was considered bright and energetic. Cute's 16th and 17th singles (2011) were happy songs in a major key, but the 18th single "Kimi wa Jitensha Watashi wa Densha de Kitaku" (April 2012) was quite unusual. It was a rock ballad about saying goodbye (it is time to go home; the song's young female protagonist must part with the boy she loves). Since then, the group's songs have generally been more mature.

=== Public image ===
BARKS praised Cute's "power performance" at the festival Idol Yokochō Matsuri on April 8, 2012 as being "overwhelming from beginning to end" and having demonstrated the "number one unity" out of all Hello! Project acts.

Kawaii Girl Japan states that Cute has not only been acclaimed as "the best performer in the Hello! Project," but is also recognized as "the best live performer" or simply "the best performer" by fans of other idol groups. Reviewing the group's performance at the Nico Nico Chōkaigi festival, held on April 28–29, 2012, the website is impressed by how Cute covered the entire stage, being both dynamic and delicate, and how the group kept the audience intrigued and captivated. Depending on the song, Cute members changed their facial expressions from happiness to sadness, easily commanding the audience's mood. Cute's fans are known as "Team Cute."

=== Controversies ===
The December 4, 2008 episode of the TV Tokyo variety show Yorosen!, featuring Cute, included a part on Adolf Hitler in a segment called "Great Men of the World." In it, a Cute member, acting as a "teacher" giving a comic history class to other members, called the dictator "Uncle Hitler," presented a drawing of him, impersonated him, and said that Hitler's speeches had a "soothing effect." The broadcast brought about heavy criticism on Internet message boards, protesting against Hitler being referred to as a "great man" and the contents of the comic lecture. TV Tokyo and the show's production company subsequently issued apologies. "The program's content was based on a mistaken interpretation of history and was inappropriate," TV Tokyo stated on its website.

=== In popular culture ===
A likeness of Okai, Hagiwara, and Suzuki appeared in episode 36 of Gintama. The logo for Cute's band name also appeared in the same episode. All eight members of Cute appeared in episode 93 of Gintama.

== Discography ==
=== Singles ===
==== Indie singles ====
1. "Massara Blue Jeans"
2. "Soku Dakishimete"
3. "Ōki na Ai de Motenashite"
4. "Wakkyanai (Z)"

==== Major singles ====
1. "Sakura Chirari"
2. "Meguru Koi no Kisetsu"
3. "Tokaikko Junjō"
4. "Lalala Shiawase no Uta"
5. "Namida no Iro"
6. "Edo no Temari Uta II"
7. "Forever Love"
8. "Bye Bye Bye!"
9. "Shochū Omimai Mōshiagemasu"
10. "Everyday Zekkōchō!!"
11. "Shock!"
12. "Campus Life (Umarete Kite Yokatta)"
13. "Dance de Bakōn!"
14. "Aitai Lonely Christmas"
15. "Kiss Me Aishiteru"
16. "Momoiro Sparkling"
17. "Sekaiichi Happy na Onna no Ko"
18. "Kimi wa Jitensha Watashi wa Densha de Kitaku"
19. "Aitai Aitai Aitai na"
20. "Kono Machi"
21. "Crazy Kanzen na Otona"
22. "Kanashiki Amefuri / Adam to Eve no Dilemma"
23. "Tokai no Hitorigurashi / Aitte Motto Zanshin"
24. "Kokoro no Sakebi o Uta ni Shitemita / Love Take It All"
25. "The Power / Kanashiki Heaven (Single Version)"
26. "I Miss You / The Future"
27. "The Middle Management (Josei Chūkan Kanrishoku) / Gamusha Life / Tsugi no Kado o Magare"
28. "Arigatō (Mugen no Yell) / Arashi o Okosunda Exciting Fight!"
29. "Naze Hito wa Arasou n' Darō? / Summer Wind / Jinsei wa Step!"
30. "Mugen Climax / Ai wa Maru de Seidenki / Singing (Ano Koro no Yō ni)"
31. "To Tomorrow / Final Squall / The Curtain Rises"

=== Albums ===
==== Studio albums ====
1. Cutie Queen Vol. 1
2. 2 Mini: Ikiru to Iu Chikara
3. 3rd: Love Escalation!
4. 4 Akogare My Star
5. Shocking 5
6. Chō Wonderful! 6
7. Dai Nana Shō 'Utsukushikutte Gomen ne'
8. 8 Queen of J-pop
9. °Cmaj9

==== Compilation albums ====
1. Cute Nan Desu! Zen Single Atsumechaimashita! 1
2. 2 Cute Shinseinaru Best Album
3. Complete Single Collection

== Awards ==
Year	Award	Category	Nominated work	Result
2007	Best Hits Kayosai	New Artist Award	Cute	Won
2007	Best Hits Kayosai	Best New Artist Award	Cute	Nominated
2007	Japan Cable Awards	Cable Music Award	"Meguru Koi no Kisetsu"	Won
2007	49th Japan Record Awards	New Artist Award	"Tokaikko Junjō"	Won
2007	49th Japan Record Awards	Best New Artist Award	"Tokaikko Junjō"	Won
2008	50th Japan Record Awards	Gold Award	"Edo no Temari Uta II"	Won
2008	50th Japan Record Awards	Grand Prix	"Edo no Temari Uta II"	Nominated

== See also ==
- Hello! Project Kids
- Berryz Kobo

Preceded by Ayaka	Japan Record Award for Best New Artist; 2007	Succeeded by Jero
