= Namida no Iro =

- Regular Edition cover

Single by Cute

from the album 4 Akogare My Star
- Released: April 23, 2008 (JP)
- Recorded: 2008
- Genre: J-pop; Latin pop
- Length: 13:24
- Label: Zetima
- Songwriter: Tsunku
- Producer: Tsunku

Cute singles chronology
"La La La Shiawase no Uta" (2008)	"Namida no Iro" (2008)	"Edo no Temari Uta II" (2008)

Music video
- "Namida no Iro" on YouTube

"Namida no Iro" (涙の色; The Colour of Tears) is Japanese pop Hello! Project group Cute's fifth major single, released on April 23, 2008, under the Zetima label. Two version are available: The limited edition (EPCE-5553～4) which includes a bonus DVD and the regular edition (EPCE-5555). The first pressings of the limited and regular editions contain a card with a serial number on it that allow buyer to enter to win tickets to a Fan Club Event. It debuted at number 4 in the Oricon Weekly Singles Chart, remaining in the chart for 4 weeks.

== Description ==
The song is arranged in the style of Latin pop by Yoshimasa Fujizawa. It features flamenco guitar solos at both intro and ending, with Spanish guitar strumming technique such as rasgueado, and Latin percussion such as timbales and congas at the background throughout the song . The lyrics and melody is written by producer Tsunku.

The selected lead singers for Namida no Iro are Maimi Yajima and Airi Suzuki, the minor singer is Saki Nakajima. Its dance performance designated Maimi Yajima, Airi Suzuki and Saki Nakajima as choreographical centre.

In c/w, Darling I Love you, Yajima receiving one and Suzuki two of the only three solo lines.

== Track listing ==
All tracks are written by Tsunku.

No.	Title	Length
1.	"Namida no Iro" (涙の色, "The Colour of Tears")
2.	"Darling I Love You (°C-ute ver.)" (ダーリン I LOVE YOU（°C-ute ver.）)
3.	"Namida no Iro (Instrumental)" (涙の色（Instrumental）)

== Charts ==
Chart (2008)	Peak position
Oricon Daily Singles Chart	2
Oricon Weekly Singles Chart	4
Billboard Japan Hot 100	26
Billboard Japan Hot Singles Sales	9
