= Cutie Queen Vol. 1 =

- Regular Edition

Studio album by Cute
- Released: October 25, 2006 (JP)
- Genre: J-pop
- Label: Zetima
- Producer: Tsunku

Cute chronology
Cutie Queen Vol. 1 (2006)	2 Mini: Ikiru to Iu Chikara (2007)

Singles from Cutie Queen Vol. 1
- 1. "Massara Blue Jeans" Released: May 6, 2006; 2. "Soku Dakishimete" Released: June 3, 2006; 3. "Ōkina Ai de Motenashite" Released: July 9, 2006; 4. "Wakkyanai (Z)" Released: July 29, 2006

Cutie Queen Vol. 1 (キューティークイーン VOL.1, Kyūtī Kuīn Boryūmu Wan) is the first album by the Japanese pop idol group Cute, released on October 25, 2006 on the Zetima label. The album was released in limited and regular editions. The limited edition included an extra DVD.

The album debuted at number 7 in the Daily Oricon Albums Chart. It ranked 15th in the Oricon weekly chart, staying in the list for 3 weeks. As of 2011, it remains C-ute's 2nd best selling album.

The single "Wakkyanai (Z)" (わっきゃない(Ｚ), Wakkyanai Zetto; It's easy) was released on July 29, 2006 on fb indie label. Its title is a play on words being that "Wakkyanaize" itself has no true meaning. It is only an indirect translation of colloquial "Wake-nai-ze" (訳ないぜ) into the English idiom "it's easy", after being deformed deliberately to achieve an English-sounding title. The song was their initial original tune, and was first sung on November 27, 2005, at a fan club event. In June 2006, it was chosen as a theme song for "Kodomo Mirai-Haku 2006" (こども未来博2006, Science-Expo for Children 2006) and was decided to be released in July. This was the final release to feature Megumi Murakami.

== Track listing ==
All songs written and composed by Tsunku.

CD

1. "Massara Blue Jeans" (まっさらブルージーンズ, Massara Burū Jīnzu; "Brand New Blue Jeans")
2. "Wakkyanai (Z)" (わっきゃない(Z), Wakkyanai Zetto; "It's Easy")
3. "Soku Dakishimete" (即 抱きしめて; "Hold Me Now")
4. "Ōki na Ai de Motenashite" (大きな愛でもてなして; "Entertain Me With a Big Love")
5. "Time Capsule" (タイムカプセル, Taimu Kapuseru)
6. "Everyday Yeah! Kataomoi" (Everyday Yeah! 片想い; "Everyday Yeah! Unrequited Love")
7. "As One"
8. "Yes! Shiawase (°C-ute Version)" (Yes! しあわせ; "Yes! I'm Happy")
9. "Endless Love ~I Love You More~ (°C-ute Version)"

Limited Edition DVD

1. Everyday Yeah! Kataomoi (Everyday Yeah! 片想い) (from "Cutie Circuit 2006 Final in Yomiuriland East Live: September 10 is °C-ute's Day")
2. SPOT
3. Wakkyanai (Z) (Special Edition) (わっきゃない(Z) (SPECIAL EDITION))

== Charts ==
Chart (2006)	Peak position	Sales	
Chart (2006)	Peak position	First week	Total
Japan (Oricon Daily Albums Chart)	7		
Japan (Oricon Weekly Albums Chart)	15	13,402	15,752
