= Kirarin Revolution discography =

- Studio albums: 3
- Soundtrack albums: 6
- Live albums: 2
- Compilation albums: 1
- Singles: 11
- Video albums: 9
- Music videos: 12

Kirarin Revolution is a Japanese manga series that was adapted into an animated series from 2006 to 2009. Music for the series was managed by Up-Front Works and released under the Zetima label. Throughout its run, the show has released three studio albums, two live albums, one compilation album, nine video singles, eleven singles, five soundtrack albums, and twelve music videos.

Koharu Kusumi from the Japanese idol girl group Morning Musume made her solo singing and acting debut as the main character, Kirari Tsukishima; portraying the character both in the anime and in a real-world context made her one of the pioneers of the "idol voice actor" crossover beginning in the late 2000s. Along with providing Kirari Tsukishima's voice for the series, Kusumi released music as Kirari under the name Kirari Tsukishima starring Koharu Kusumi (Morning Musume) (月島きらり starring 久住小春(モーニング娘。)), including providing the opening and ending themes to Kirarin Revolution.

From June to September 2007, Mai Hagiwara from Cute was cast as the anime-original character, Hikaru Mizuki, and became part of the in-show idol subunit Kira Pika with Kusumi. The duo released the single "Hana o Pūn / Futari wa NS", which were used as the opening and ending themes to Kirarin Revolution. Hagiwara would also make live television appearances portraying the character and appeared as a special guest during Kirarin Revolution's final concert event on May 4, 2009.

The second season, Kirarin Revolution Stage 3, cast Sayaka Kitahara and You Kikkawa from Hello Pro Egg as the anime-original characters Noel Yukino and Kobeni Hanasaki, who form the in-show Japanese idol group MilkyWay with Kirari. Takuya Ide and Shikou Kanai were cast as the new voice actors for Hiroto Kazama and Seiji Hiwatari, the members of the in-show group Ships. Like Kusumi, MilkyWay and Ships released music and made appearances at concerts and other television shows, such as Haromoni and Oha Suta, as their characters.

== Albums ==
=== Studio albums ===
Title	Year	Album details	Peak chart positions	Sales
Title	Year	Album details	JPN	Sales
Mitsuboshi (☆☆☆)	2007	Released: February 28, 2007; Label: Zetima; Formats: CD	16	26,403+
Kirarin Land (きらりん☆ランド)	2007	Released: December 19, 2007; Label: Zetima; Formats: CD	17	30,803+
Kirari to Fuyu (きらりと冬)	2008	Released: December 17, 2008; Label: Zetima; Formats: CD	26	12,571+
"—" denotes releases that did not chart or were not released in that region.

=== Compilation albums ===
Title	Year	Album details	Peak chart positions	Sales
Title	Year	Album details	JPN	Sales
Best Kirari (ベスト☆きらり)	2009	Released: March 11, 2009; Label: Zetima; Formats: CD	18	11,600+
"—" denotes releases that did not chart or were not released in that region.

=== Soundtrack albums ===
Title	Year	Album details	Peak chart positions	Sales
Title	Year	Album details	JPN	Sales
Kirarin Revolution Song Selection (きらりん☆レボリューション・ソング・セレクション)	2006	Released: October 18, 2006; Label: Zetima; Formats: CD	23	12,140+
Kirarin Revolution Original Soundtrack Vol. 1 (「きらりん☆レボリューション」オリジナル・サウンドトラック VOL.1)	2006	Released: November 22, 2006; Label: Zetima; Formats: CD	185	—
Kirarin Revolution Song Selection 2 (きらりん☆レボリューション・ソング・セレクション2)	2007	Released: September 12, 2007; Label: Zetima; Formats: CD	47	3,325+
Kirarin Revolution Song Selection 3 (きらりん☆レボリューション・ソング・セレクション3)	2008	Released: July 23, 2008; Label: Zetima; Formats: CD	97	3,327+
Kirarin Revolution Song Selection 4 (きらりん☆レボリューション・ソング・セレクション4)	2008	Released: August 27, 2008; Label: Zetima; Formats: CD	78	2,860+
Kirarin Revolution Song Selection 5 (きらりん☆レボリューション・ソング・セレクション5)	2009	Released: March 18, 2009; Label: Zetima; Formats: CD	101	1,548+
"—" denotes releases that did not chart or were not released in that region.

== Singles ==
Title	Year	Peak chart positions		Sales	Album
Title	Year	JPN		Sales	Album
Title	Year	Oricon Weekly	Hot 100 (Note: Rankings on releases prior to 2008 are not available.)	Sales	Album
"Koi Kana" (恋☆カナ) (Kirari Tsukishima starring Koharu Kusumi (Morning Musume))	2006	12	—	38,650+	Mitsuboshi
"Balalaika" (バラライカ) (Kirari Tsukishima starring Koharu Kusumi (Morning Musume))	2006	8	—	72,709+	Mitsuboshi
"Happy" (ハッピー☆彡) (Kirari Tsukishima starring Koharu Kusumi (Morning Musume))	2007	2	—	57,278+	Kirarin Land
"Hana o Pūn / Futari wa NS" (はなをぷーん/ふたりはNS) (Kira Pika)	2007	9	—	46,127+	Kirarin Land
"Chance!" (チャンス!) (Kirari Tsukishima starring Koharu Kusumi (Morning Musume))	2007	9	—	47,057+	Kirarin Land
"Anataboshi" (アナタボシ) (MilkyWay)	2008	3	24	49,492+	Kirari to Fuyu
"Pa-Pancake" (パパンケーキ) (Kirari Tsukishima starring Koharu Kusumi (Morning Musume))	2008	11	64	20,595+	Kirari to Fuyu
"Tokyo Friend Ships" (Ships)	2008	69	—	—	Kirarin Revolution Song Selection 4
"Tan Tan Tān!" (タンタンターン!) (MilkyWay)	2008	8	38	16,667+	Kirari to Fuyu
"Kimi ga Iru" (きみがいる) (Ships)	2008	140	—	—	Kirarin Revolution Song Selection 5
"Happy Happy Sunday!" (はぴ☆はぴ サンデー!) (Kirari Tsukishima starring Koharu Kusumi (Morning Musume))	2009	9	—	14,468+	Best Kirari
"—" denotes releases that did not chart or were not released in that region.

== Videography ==
=== Video albums ===
Title	Details	Peak chart positions	Sales
Title	Details	JPN	Sales
Kirarin Revolution Special Live (きらりん☆レボリューション スペシャルライブ)	Released: February 25, 2009; Label: Zetima; Formats: DVD	65	—
Kirarin Revolution Final Stage (きらりん☆レボリューション ファイナル☆ステージ)	Released: July 8, 2009; Label: Zetima; Formats: DVD	27	—

=== Video singles ===
Title	Year	Peak chart positions	Sales
Title	Year	JPN	Sales
Single V: "Koi Kana" (シングルV「恋☆カナ」) (Kirari Tsukishima starring Koharu Kusumi (Morning Musume))	2006	30	8,832+
Single V: "Balalaika" (シングルV「バラライカ」) (Kirari Tsukishima starring Koharu Kusumi (Morning Musume))	2006	13	7,720+
Single V: "Happy" (シングルV「ハッピー☆彡」) (Kirari Tsukishima starring Koharu Kusumi (Morning Musume))	2007	15	7,007+
Single V: "Hana o Pūn / Futari wa NS" (シングルV「はなをぷーん/ふたりはNS」) (Kira Pika)	2007	27	6,232+
Single V: "Chance!" (シングルV「チャンス!」) (Kirari Tsukishima starring Koharu Kusumi (Morning Musume))	2007	33	4,738+
Single V: "Anataboshi" (シングルV「アナタボシ」) (MilkyWay)	2008	22	6,043+
Single V: "Pa-Pancake" (シングルV「パパンケーキ」) (Kirari Tsukishima starring Koharu Kusumi (Morning Musume))	2008	11	3,284+
Single V: "Tan Tan Tān!" (シングルV「タンタンターン!」) (MilkyWay)	2008	23	4,098+
Single V: "Happy Happy Sunday!" (シングルV「はぴ☆はぴ サンデー!」) (Kirari Tsukishima starring Koharu Kusumi (Morning Musume))	2009	30	2,690+

=== Music videos ===
Title	Year	Director	Ref.
"Koi Kana"	2006	—	—
"Balalaika"	2006	Hideo Kawatani	
"Happy"	2007	Hideo Kawatani	
"Hana o Pūn"	2007	—	—
"Futari wa NS"	2007	—	—
"Chance!"	2007	Toshiyuki Suzuki	
"Anataboshi"	2008	Hideo Kawatani	
"Pa-Pancake"	2008	Toshiyuki Suzuki	
"Tokyo Friend Ships"	2008	Takayuki Ohmoto	
"Tan Tan Tan!"	2008	Toshiyuki Suzuki	
"Kimi ga Iru"	2008	—	—
"Happy Happy Sunday!"	2009	Toshiyuki Suzuki	

== Tours ==
=== Headlining ===
- Kirarin Revolution Special Live (きらりん☆レボリューション スペシャルライブ) (2008)
- Kirarin Revolution Final Stage (きらりん☆レボリューション ファイナル☆ステージ) (2009)

=== Concert participation ===
- Morning Musume Concert Tour Autumn 2006: Dance! Morning Curry (モーニング娘。コンサートツアー 2006 秋 踊れ!モーニングカレー) (2006)
- Morning Musume 10th Anniversary Concert Tour Summer 2007: Thank You, My Dearest (モーニング娘。誕生10年記念隊 コンサートツアー2007夏～サンキューMy Dearest～) (2007)
- Morning Musume Concert Tour Autumn 2007: Bon Kyu! Bon Kyu! BOMB (モーニング娘。 コンサートツアー 2007 秋 ～ボン キュッ!ボン キュッ!BOMB～) (2007)
- Morning Musume Concert Tour Autumn 2008: Resonant Live (モーニング娘。コンサートツアー2008 秋～リゾナントLIVE～) (2008)
