= Best Kirari =

Greatest hits album by Kirari Tsukishima starring Koharu Kusumi (Morning Musume)
- Released: March 11, 2009
- Recorded: 2006–2009
- Genre: J-pop
- Length: 1:10:36
- Label: Zetima

Kirari Tsukishima starring Koharu Kusumi (Morning Musume) chronology
Kirari to Fuyu (2008)	Best Kirari (2009)

Kirarin Revolution chronology
Kirari to Fuyu (2008)	Best Kirari (2009)	Kirarin Revolution Song Selection 5 (2009)

Best Kirari (ベスト☆きらり, Besuto Kirari) is a greatest hits album of the character Kirari Tsukishima from the Japanese anime Kirarin Revolution. The album was released on March 11, 2009, with songs performed by Koharu Kusumi from Morning Musume, credited as "Kirari Tsukishima starring Koharu Kusumi (Morning Musume)" (月島きらり starring 久住小春(モーニング娘。)).

== Background and release ==
Best Kirari is a greatest hits album of the character Kirari Tsukishima from Kirarin Revolution. Morning Musume member Koharu Kusumi, who provides her voice, is credited as "Kirari Tsukishima starring Koharu Kusumi (Morning Musume)" (月島きらり starring 久住小春(モーニング娘。)). The album compiles all opening and ending theme songs she performed for Kirarin Revolution, including songs performed with Mai Hagiwara from Cute as Kira Pika and songs with Sayaka Kitahara and You Kikkawa from Hello Pro Egg as MilkyWay.

The album was released on March 11, 2009, under the Zetima label. The limited edition featured an alternate cover and exclusive DVD. The regular edition came with an original sticker as its first press bonus.

== Reception ==
The album debuted at #18 in the Oricon Weekly Albums Chart and charted for five weeks.

== Track listing ==
Album
No.	Title	Lyrics	Music	Arrangement	Length
1.	"Koi Kana (恋☆カナ)"	Shin Furuya	Tetsurō Oda	Masaki Iehara	3:34
2.	"Sugao-flavor"	Michito	Tetsurō Oda	Kōji Gotō	4:55
3.	"Balalaika (バラライカ, Bararaika)"	Bulge	Shigeki Sako	Shigeki Sako	3:41
4.	"Mizuiro Melody (水色メロディ, Mizuiro Merodi)"	Shin Furuya	Katsuhiko Kurosu	Daisuke Katō	3:38
5.	"Love da yo Darling (Loveだよ☆ダーリン, Love da yo Dārin)"	Chieko Suyama	Katsuya Yoshida	Katsuya Yoshida	3:24
6.	"Happy (ハッピー☆彡, Happī)"	Bounceback	Bounceback	Bounceback	3:58
7.	"Koi no Mahō wa Habibi no Bi! (恋の魔法はハビビのビ!)"	Chieko Suyama, Katsuya Yoshida	Katsuya Yoshida	Katsuya Yoshida	3:43
8.	"Chance! (チャンス!, Chansu!)"	2°C	Tetsurō Oda	Masaki Iehara	3:36
9.	"Ramutara (ラムタラ)"	2°C	Yūya Saitō	Yūya Saitō	3:35
10.	"Olala"	Kanae Koyama	Tomokazu Tashiro	Yōichirō Yasuoka	3:15
11.	"Papancake (パパンケーキ, Papankēki)"	2°C	Fireworks	Jirō Miyanaga	4:10
12.	"Happy Happy Sunday! (はぴ☆はぴ サンデー！, Hapi Hapi Sandē!)"	Kenichi Maeyamada	Kenichi Maeyamada	Kenichi Maeyamada	3:46
13.	"Hana wo Pūn (はなをぷーん)" (Kira Pika)	YumYum	MenMen	Jirō Miyanaga, MenMen	4:28
14.	"Futari wa NS (ふたりはNS)" (Kira Pika)	YumYum	MenMen	Jirō Miyanaga	4:40
15.	"Anataboshi (アナタボシ)"	2°C	Yūya Saitō	Yūya Saitō	3:25
16.	"Sansan Gogo (サンサンGOGO)" (MilkyWay)	2°C	Katsuya Yoshida	Katsuya Yoshida	4:30
17.	"Tan Tan Tān! (タンタンターン！)" (MilkyWay)	Kenichi Maeyamada	Kenichi Maeyamada	Kenichi Maeyamada	4:31
18.	"Gamushalala (ガムシャララ, Gamusharara)" (MilkyWay)	2°C	Dai Murai	Dai Murai	3:58
Total length:					1:10:36

Limited edition DVD
No.	Title	Length
1.	"Koi Kana"	3:47
2.	"Balalaika"	3:44
3.	"Happy"	4:14
4.	"Chance!"	3:44
5.	"Papancake"	4:18
6.	"Happy Happy Sunday!"	3:56
7.	"Hana o Pun"	4:36
8.	"Futari wa NS"	4:44
9.	"Anataboshi"	3:31
10.	"Tan Tan Tān!"	4:45
Total length:		41:19

== Charts ==
Chart	Peak position
Oricon Weekly Albums Chart	18
