= List of Kirarin Revolution Stage 3 episodes =

- Season 3
- No. of episodes: 51

Release
- Original network: TV Tokyo
- Original release: April 8, 2008 – March 27, 2009

Season chronology
- ← Previous; Kirarin Revolution

Kirarin Revolution Stage 3 is the second season of Kirarin Revolution and a direct continuation of the first season. It aired on TV Tokyo from April 8, 2008, to March 27, 2009, for a total of 51 episodes. The show was animated by SynergySP and SimImage in 3D animation and HD format.

The show introduced Noel Yukino and Kobeni Hanasaki to the main cast, two original characters played by Sayaka Kitahara and You Kikkawa from Hello Pro Egg. The voice actors for Seiji Hiwatari and Hiroto Kazama were replaced with Shikou Kanai and Takuya Ide.

All opening theme songs were performed by Koharu Kusumi, Sayaka Kitahara, and You Kikkawa under the name MilkyWay, a Japanese idol girl group featured in the show. In addition, Kusumi continued to perform some of the ending themes under the name Kirari Tsukishima starring Koharu Kusumi (Morning Musume) (月島きらり starring 久住小春(モーニング娘。)).

The opening theme songs include "Anataboshi" from episodes 103-128 and "Tan Tan Tān!" from episodes 129–153, both performed by MilkyWay. The ending theme songs include "SanSan GoGo" by MilkyWay from episodes 103–155; "Pa-Pancake" by Kusumi from episodes 116–128; "Gamushalala" by MilkyWay from episodes 129–141; and "Happy Happy Sunday!" by Kusumi from episodes 142–153.

== Episode list ==
No.	Title	Original release date
103	"Yay! The Search for a Second Kirari!!"; Transliteration: "Iēi! Dai Ni no Kirari wo Sagase!!" (Japanese: イェーイ! 第2のきらりをさがせ!!)	April 4, 2008
Kirari discovers that the Office Of Muranishi will be searching for a second Kirari, so that Kirari can team up with them to form another sub-unit. However, after going through the audition, no one seems suitable to be an idol.
104	"Noel! Kirari's Big Scouting Plan!?"; Transliteration: "Noeru-samān! Kirari no Sukauto Daisakusen!?" (Japanese: のえるさまぁ〜ん! きらりのスカウト大作戦!?)	April 11, 2008
With Noel being a popular student at an all-girl private school, she tries to achieve her dreams.
105	"I'm Getting a Signal?? Strange Girl Kobeni"; Transliteration: "Hatehate?? Fushigi Shōjo Ko-be-ni" (Japanese: ハテハテ?? 不思議少女 こ☆べ☆に)	April 18, 2008
Kirari encounters Kobeni, searching for treasure again and tells her that she will help. Kobeni spends the whole day with Kirari as Kirari shows her how an idol works. The director tells her she has the aura to become an idol, but Kobeni is too shy and scared to become an ido.
106	"Tambourine! The Three Shining Stars"; Transliteration: "Tanbarin! Kagayaku Mittsu no Hoshi" (Japanese: タンバリン! 輝く3つの星)	April 25, 2008
Noel and Kobeni are having trouble getting along and form a unit named Milky Way.
107	"MilkyWay Briday Show"; Transliteration: "MilkyWay Buraidaru Shō" (Japanese: MilkyWay ブライダルショー)	May 2, 2008
As MilkyWay makes its debut, the members end up hosting a bridal show.
108	"Ni-kun & Mi-chan: The Journey of Love and Youth"; Transliteration: "Nī-kun & Mī-chan: Ai to Seishun no Tabidachi" (Japanese: にーくん&みーちゃん 愛と青春の旅立ち)	May 9, 2008
Ni-kun and Mi-chan come again and to be Na-san's apprentice.
109	"Fight On! The Big Plan to be Happy Stars"; Transliteration: "Faitō! Happii Sutaa Daisakusen" (Japanese: ふぁいとぉー!ハッピースター大作戦)	May 16, 2008
MilkyWay needs to make a commercial of twinkle star drinks.
110	"Suddenly! The only small Kirari!!"; Transliteration: "Ikinari! Narikiri Chibi Kirari!!" (Japanese: いきなり!なりきりチビきらり!!)	May 23, 2008
A little girl claims that she is also Kirari.
111	"I'm Worried: The Melancholy of Kobeni"; Transliteration: "Onayami Desu Kobeni-chan no Yūutsu" (Japanese: お悩みですこべにちゃんのユウウツ)	May 30, 2008
Kobeni is depressed and not her usual self, so someone needs to help her feel better again.
112	"Friendships: Hiroto and Seiji"; Transliteration: "Furendo SHIPS Hiroto to Seiji" (Japanese: フレンドSHIPS 宙人と星司)	June 6, 2008
Ships is having trouble thinking of a new song to sing, whick leads into the creation of the song "Tokyo Friend Ships".
113	"Three Stars! The Big Plan to Make Noel Fashionable!!"; Transliteration: "Hoshi Mittsu! Noeru no Sensu Appu Daisakusen!!" (Japanese: ☆みっつ! のえるのセンスアップ大作戦!!)	June 13, 2008
Noel is being criticized for not having any fashion sense as an idol on a show which rate idols' sense of style.
114	"Bravo! The First Concert!"; Transliteration: "Burabō! Fāsuto Konsāto!!" (Japanese: ブラボー! ファーストコンサート!!)	June 20, 2008
115	"Reaching Everyone! Wish Upon a Star"; Transliteration: "Minna ni Todoke! Hoshi ni Negai wo" (Japanese: みんなにとどけっ!星に願いを)	June 27, 2008
116	"Exciting! MilkyWay's Day Off!"; Transliteration: "Ukiuki! MilkyWay no Kyūjitsu" (Japanese: ウキウキ! MilkyWayの休日)	July 4, 2008
117	"Let's Dig In! A Sweet Battle on the Beach"; Transliteration: "Meshiagare! Nagisa no Amāi Raiketsu!!" (Japanese: めしあがれ！渚のあまぁ～い対決！！)	July 11, 2008
118	"Venus! Once an Idol Changes into a Swimsuit"; Transliteration: "Vīnasu! Aidoru ga Mizugi ni Kigaetara" (Japanese: ヴィーナス！アイドルが水着に着替えたら)	July 18, 2008
119	"A Hottie? Na-san's Longest Day"; Transliteration: "Ikemen? Nā-san no Ichiban Nagai Nichi" (Japanese: イケメン？なーさんの一番長い日)	July 25, 2008
120	"Watch! The Message Traveling Through Time"; Transliteration: "Uōcchi! Messēji wa Toki wo Koete" (Japanese: うぉ～っち！メッセージは時を超えて)	August 1, 2008
121	"Gold Medal! The S-e-c-r-e-t of the Yukino Family"; Transliteration: "Kin Medaru! Yukino-ke no Hi-mi-tsu" (Japanese: 金メダル！雪野家のヒ・ミ・ツ)	August 8, 2008
122	Transliteration: "Eigaka kettei! MilkyWay Hatsu shutsuen!?" (Japanese: 映画化決定！MilkyWay初出演！？)	August 15, 2008
123	"Summer-colored Love... Nothing Was Said"; Transliteration: "Natsuiro no Koi... Nani mo Ienakute" (Japanese: 夏色の恋・・・何も言えなくて)	August 22, 2008
124	"Cold, Cold! Welcome, Penguin"; Transliteration: "Hiehie! Pengin-san Irasshāi" (Japanese: ひえひえ！ペンギンさんいらっしゃ～い)	August 29, 2008
125	"Save Me! Kirari's Hero!"; Transliteration: "Tasukete Kirari no Hīrō!" (Japanese: たすけて☆きらりのヒーロー!)	September 5, 2008
126	"Swaying! Kirari's Heart Sways!?"; Transliteration: "Yurayura! Yureru Kirari no Koigokoro!?" (Japanese: ゆらゆら！ゆれるきらりの恋心！？)	September 12, 2008
127	"Beep-boop! The Mysterious Robot Producer?!"; Transliteration: "Pikopiko Nazo no Robotto Purodyūsā!?" (Japanese: ピコピコ なぞのロボットプロデューサー！？)	September 19, 2008
128	"MilkyWay: New Melody"; Transliteration: "MilkyWay Atarashī Merodī" (Japanese: MilkyWay☆新しいメロディー)	September 26, 2008
129	"Mysterious! A Hottie Idol Appears"; Transliteration: "Misuteriasu! Bishōnen Aidoru Arawaru!" (Japanese: ミステリアス！美少年アイドルあらわる！)	October 3, 2008
130	"Dark Knight! His Name is Cloudy!"; Transliteration: "DARK KNIGHT! Sono Na wa Kuraudi!" (Japanese: DARK KNIGHT！その名はクラウディ！)	October 10, 2008
131	Transliteration: "Bikē! Ikemen Kontesuto!?" (Japanese: びけーっ！イケメンコンテスト！？)	October 17, 2008
132	"A Pang in my Heart... Noel's Painful One-sided Feelings"; Transliteration: "Kyun... Noeru no Setsunai Kataomoi" (Japanese: キュン･･･のえるのせつない片思い)	October 24, 2008
133	Transliteration: "Wana... Takurami no Kuraudi" (Japanese: ワナ･･･たくらみのクラウディ)	October 31, 2008
134	"No Way... the Kiss of Betrayal"; Transliteration: "Uso... Uragiri no Kisu" (Japanese: うそ･･･裏切りのキス)	November 7, 2008
135	"Why?... The Friendship Made From Glass"; Transliteration: "Naze... Garasu no Yūjō" (Japanese: なぜ･･･ガラスの友情)	November 14, 2008
136	"Change! Kirari and Mi-chan?!"; Transliteration: "Chenji! Kirari to Mī-chan!?" (Japanese: チェンジ！きらりとみーちゃん！？)	November 21, 2008
137	"Danger! A S-i-n-f-u-l Birthday"; Transliteration: "Kiken! I-ke-na-i Bāsudei" (Japanese: キケン！い・け・な・いバースディ)	November 28, 2008
138	"Scandal! Don't Lose, Kirari"; Transliteration: "Sukyandaru! Makeruna Kirari" (Japanese: スキャンダル！負けるなきらり)	December 5, 2008
139	"Kirari Tsukishima, Returning to a Normal Life"; Transliteration: "Tsukishima Kirari, Futsū no Onnanoko ni Modorimasu" (Japanese: 月島きらり、ふつうの女の子にもどります)	December 12, 2008
140	"Start! A Concert Starting from Zero"; Transliteration: "Sutāto! Zero kara Hajimaru Konsāto" (Japanese: スタート！ゼロからはじまるコンサート)	December 19, 2008
141	"Farewell, Erina! An Eternal Parting?!"; Transliteration: "Saraba Erina! Eien no Owakare!?" (Japanese: さらばエリナ！永遠のお別れ！？)	December 26, 2008
142	"Super Idol!! The Honest MilkyWay"; Transliteration: "Sūpā Aidoru!! Sugao no MilkyWay" (Japanese: スーパーアイドル！！素顔のMilkyWay)	January 9, 2009
143	"Momo! Nī's Romantic Story"; Transliteration: "Mōmō! Nī-kun no Aijō Monogatari" (Japanese: モーモー！にーくんの愛情物語)	January 16, 2009
144	"Esper!! A Fantastic Mushroom?"; Transliteration: "Esupā!! Fantasutikku Ki-no-ko?" (Japanese: エスパー！！ファンタスティック き・の・こ？)	January 23, 2009
145	Transliteration: "Rakkī: Mahō no Kamen ni Goyōshin?" (Japanese: ラッキー☆魔法の仮面にご用心？)	January 30, 2009
146	"Survival?! The Legend of the Abandoned Idol Island"; Transliteration: "Sabaibaru!? Aidoru Mujintō Densetsu" (Japanese: サバイバル！？アイドル無人島伝説)	February 6, 2009
147	"A Little Bit Chocolate! Heart-beating Valentine"; Transliteration: "Choko tto! Dokidoki Barentain ♥" (Japanese: チョコっと！どきどきバレンタイン♥)	February 13, 2009
148	"Nyappy, A Great Kitty March!"; Transliteration: "Nyappii, Neko-neko Daikoushin!" (Japanese: ニャッピー♪ねこねこ大行進！)	February 20, 2009
149	"723 Minutes! MilkyWay Radio Wave Jack?!"; Transliteration: "723-pun! MilkyWay Denpa Jakku!?" (Japanese: 723分！MilkyWay電波ジャック！？)	February 27, 2009
150	"Welcome Home... the Happy Bluebird"; Transliteration: "Okaerinasai... Shiawase no Burūbādo" (Japanese: お帰りなさい･･･幸せのブルーバード)	March 6, 2009
151	"Raise the Curtains! Who is the Diamond Idol Queen?!"; Transliteration: "Maku Ake! Daiyamondo Aidoru Kuīn wa Dare da!?" (Japanese: 幕開け！ダイヤモンドアイドルクイーンは誰だ!？)	March 13, 2009
152	"Duel! Tap, Tap, Tap with a Real Smile"; Transliteration: "Shoubu! Honki no Egao de Tan Tan Tān!" (Japanese: 勝負っ！ホンキの笑顔でタンタンターン！)	March 20, 2009
153	"Kirarin Idol Revolution"; Transliteration: "Kirarin Aidoru Reboryūshon" (Japanese: きらりん☆アイドルレボリューション)	March 27, 2009

== Home media ==
Title	Episodes	DVD release date	Peak chart positions
Title	Episodes	DVD release date	JPN
Kirarin Revolution 3rd Tour Stage 1	103–106	November 7, 2008	—
Kirarin Revolution 3rd Tour Stage 2	107–110	December 10, 2008	—
Kirarin Revolution 3rd Tour Stage 3	111–114	January 7, 2009	—
Kirarin Revolution 3rd Tour Stage 4	115–118	February 6, 2009	—
Kirarin Revolution 3rd Tour Stage 5	119–122	March 6, 2009	—
Kirarin Revolution 3rd Tour Stage 6	119–122	April 3, 2009	—
Kirarin Revolution 3rd Tour Stage 7	123–126	May 8, 2009	—
Kirarin Revolution 3rd Tour Stage 8	127–130	June 10, 2009	—
Kirarin Revolution 3rd Tour Stage 9	131–134	July 8, 2009	—
Kirarin Revolution 3rd Tour Stage 10	135–138	August 5, 2009	—
Kirarin Revolution 3rd Tour Stage 11	139–142	September 9, 2009	—
Kirarin Revolution 3rd Tour Stage 12	143–147	October 2, 2009	—
Kirarin Revolution 3rd Tour Stage 13	148–151	November 6, 2009	—
