= Kirari to Fuyu =

Studio album by Kirari Tsukishima starring Koharu Kusumi (Morning Musume)
- Released: December 17, 2008
- Recorded: 2008
- Genre: J-pop
- Length: 46:23
- Label: Zetima

Kirari Tsukishima starring Koharu Kusumi (Morning Musume) chronology
Kirarin Land (2007)	Kirari to Fuyu (2008)	Best Kirari (2009)

Kirarin Revolution chronology
Kirarin Revolution Song Selection 4 (2008)	Kirari to Fuyu (2008)	Best Kirari (2009)

Singles from Kirari to Fuyu
- 1. "Anataboshi" Released: May 8, 2008; 2. "Papancake" Released: July 30, 2008; 3. "Tan Tan Tān!" Released: November 5, 2008

Kirari to Fuyu (きらりと冬) is the third studio album of the character Kirari Tsukishima from the Japanese anime Kirarin Revolution. The album was released on December 17, 2008, with songs performed by Koharu Kusumi from Morning Musume, credited as "Kirari Tsukishima starring Koharu Kusumi (Morning Musume)" (月島きらり starring 久住小春(モーニング娘。)).

== Background and release ==
Kirari to Fuyu is the third studio album of the character Kirari Tsukishima from Kirarin Revolution. Morning Musume member Koharu Kusumi, who provides her voice, is credited as "Kirari Tsukishima starring Koharu Kusumi (Morning Musume)" (月島きらり starring 久住小春(モーニング娘。)). Aside from containing new original songs, the album compiles songs from her previous single, "Papancake", as well as "Anataboshi" and "Tan Tan Tān!", her songs with Sayaka Kitahara and You Kikkawa from Hello Pro Egg under the name MilkyWay.

The album was released on December 17, 2008, under the Zetima label. The limited edition featured an alternate cover, exclusive DVD, and Happy Idol Life Kuru Kira Cards from Kirarin Revolution. The regular edition came with an original sticker as its first press bonus.

== Reception ==
The album debuted at #26 in the Oricon Weekly Albums Chart and charted for five weeks.

== Track listing ==
Album
No.	Title	Lyrics	Music	Arrangement	Length
1.	"Koi Sign (コイサイン, Koi Sain)"	Yūhei Kaneko	Hayato Takashi	Keiroku Araki	3:19
2.	"Anataboshi (アナタボシ)" (MilkyWay)	2°C	Yūya Saitō	Yūya Saitō	3:26
3.	"Papancake (パパンケーキ, Papankēki)"	2°C	Fireworks	Jirō Miyanaga	4:11
4.	"Lovetic (ラブチク, Rabu Chiku)"	Dai Murai	Dai Murai, A. Vivaldi	Dai Murai	3:44
5.	"Oh! Tomodachi (Oh! トモダチ)"	2°C	Bounceback	Bounceback	4:18
6.	"Mascolorful (マスカラフル, Masukarafuru)"	Dai Murai	Dai Murai	Dai Murai	3:59
7.	"Puppy Love (パピーラブ, Papī Rabu)"	Akirastar	Akirastar	Akirastar	3:27
8.	"So-La-Mi-Mi-Do-Re-Mi (ソラミミドレミ)"	Kōshirō Fukumoto	Kōshirō Fukumoto	Araki Keiroku	2:45
9.	"Gamushalala (ガムシャララ, Gamusharara)" (MilkyWay)	2°C	Dai Murai	Dai Murai	4:03
10.	"Tan Tan Tān! (タンタンターン！)" (MilkyWay)	Kenichi Maeyamada	Kenichi Maeyamada	Kenichi Maeyamada	4:31
11.	"Sansan Gogo (サンサンGOGO)" (MilkyWay)	2°C	Katsuya Yoshida	Katsuya Yoshida	4:30
12.	"Yume no Balloon (夢のバルーン, Yume no Barūn)"	Ritsuko Yato	Hideki Yanagisawa	Shun Ito	4:17
Total length:					46:23

Limited edition DVD
No.	Title	Length
1.	"Papancake" (Close-up Ver.)
2.	"Papancake" (Live Ver.)
3.	"Anataboshi" (Dance Shot Ver.)
4.	"Anataboshi" (Live Ver.)
5.	"Tan Tan Tān!" (Dance Shot Ver.)
6.	"Tan Tan Tān!" (Anime Ver.)
7.	"Making of Jacket Photoshoot (ジャケット撮影メイキング)"

== Charts ==
Chart	Peak position
Oricon Weekly Albums Chart	26
