= Tan Tan Tān! =

- Regular edition cover

Single by MilkyWay

from the album Kirari to Fuyu
- A-side: "Tan Tan Tān!"
- B-side: "Gamushalala"
- Released: October 29, 2008 (CD single); November 5, 2008 (DVD single)
- Recorded: 2008
- Genre: J-pop
- Length: 13:00
- Label: Zetima
- Songwriter: Kenichi Maeyamada

MilkyWay singles chronology
"Anataboshi" (2008)	"Tan Tan Tān!" (00000001)

Kirarin Revolution singles chronology
"Papancake" (2008)	"Tan Tan Tān!" (2008)	"Kimi ga Iru" (2008)

"Tan Tan Tān!" (タンタンターン!; lit. "Tap Tap Tap!") is the seventh opening theme song from the Japanese anime Kirarin Revolution. The song was released on October 29, 2008, and is performed by MilkyWay, consisting of Koharu Kusumi from Morning Musume, Sayaka Kitahara, and You Kikkawa from Hello Pro Egg as their characters, Kirari Tsukishima, Noel Yukino, and Kobeni Hanasaki.

== Background and release ==
"Tan Tan Tān!" is the seventh opening theme song to Kirarin Revolution and is performed by Koharu Kusumi from Morning Musume, Sayaka Kitahara, and You Kikkawa from Hello Pro Egg, who play the characters Kirari Tsukishima, Noel Yukino, and Kobeni Hanasaki. The song was released as MilkyWay's second single.

The single was released on October 29, 2008, under the Zetima label. "Gamushalala", the twelfth ending theme song to Kirarin Revolution, was included as a B-side and is also performed by MilkyWay.

A video single, referred as a "Single V", was released on November 5, 2008.

== Music video ==
The music video was directed by Toshiyuki Suzuki. The costumes were designed by the winner of a contest held by Ciao, of which the results were announced in the July 2008 issue. Kusumi picked it as one of her favorite outfits in Kirarin Revolution. The Starlight Headset and Starlight Tambourine featured in the music video were re-released as deluxe set by Takara Tomy.

== Reception ==
The CD single debuted at #8 in the Oricon Weekly Singles Chart and charted for 10 weeks. The single sold 16,667 physical copies on its first week. The video single charted at #23 on the Oricon Weekly DVD Charts.

== Track listing ==
=== Single ===
No.	Title	Lyrics	Music	Arrangement	Length
1.	"Tan Tan Tān! (タンタンターン!)"	Kenichi Maeyamada	Kenichi Maeyamada	Kenichi Maeyamada
2.	"Gamushalala (ガムシャララ, Gamusharara)"	2°C	Dai Murai	Dai Murai
3.	"Tan Tan Tān!" (Instrumental)		Kenichi Maeyamada	Kenichi Maeyamada

=== DVD single ===
No.	Title	Length
1.	"Tan Tan Tān!"
2.	"MilkyWay's One Point Dance Lesson (MilkyWayのワンポイントダンスレッスン)"
3.	"Tan Tan Tān!" (Dance Shot Ver.)
4.	"Making Of (メイキング映像)"

== Charts ==
=== Single ===
Chart	Peak position
Oricon Weekly Singles Chart	8
Billboard Japan Hot 100	38

=== DVD single ===
Chart	Peak position
Oricon Weekly DVD Chart	23
