= Anataboshi =

- Regular edition cover

Single by MilkyWay

from the album Kirari to Fuyu
- A-side: "Anataboshi"
- B-side: "Sansan Gogo"
- Released: April 30, 2008 (CD single); May 8, 2008 (DVD single)
- Recorded: 2008
- Genre: J-Pop
- Label: Zetima
- Songwriters: Yūya Saitō (track 1); Katsuya Yoshida (track 2)
- Lyricist: 2°C

MilkyWay singles chronology
"Anataboshi" (00000001)	"Tan Tan Tān!" (2008)

Kirarin Revolution singles chronology
"Chance!" (2007)	"Anataboshi" (2008)	"Tokyo Friend Ships" (2008)

"Anataboshi" (アナタボシ; lit. "A Star of You") is the sixth opening theme song from the Japanese anime Kirarin Revolution. The song was released on April 30, 2008, and is performed by MilkyWay, a Japanese project group consisting of Morning Musume member Koharu Kusumi, Hello Pro Egg member Sayaka Kitahara, and Hello Pro Egg member You Kikkawa as their characters, Kirari Tsukishima, Noel Yukino, and Kobeni Hanasaki. The song was released as MilkyWay's first single.

== Background and release ==
"Anataboshi" is the sixth opening theme song to Kirarin Revolution and is performed by Koharu Kusumi from Morning Musume, Sayaka Kitahara, and You Kikkawa from Hello Pro Egg, who play the characters Kirari Tsukishima, Noel Yukino, and Kobeni Hanasaki. The song was released as MilkyWay's debut single.

The single was released on April 30, 2008, under the Zetima label. "Sansan Gogo", the tenth ending theme song to Kirarin Revolution, was included as a B-side and is also performed by MilkyWay.

A video single, referred as a "Single V", was released on May 8, 2008.

== Music video ==
The music video was directed by Hideo Kawatani and produced by Tetsushi Suehiro. The Starlight Headset and Starlight Tambourine featured in the music video were produced as toys by Takara Tomy. The Starlight Headset Mini and Starlight Tambourine Mini were also produced for toddler-sized children.

== Reception ==
The CD single debuted at #3 in the Oricon Weekly Singles Chart and charted for 12 weeks. The video single charted at #22 on the Oricon Weekly DVD Charts.

== Track listing ==
=== Single ===
No.	Title	Lyrics	Music	Arrangement	Length
1.	"Anataboshi" (アナタボシ lit. A Star of You)	2°C	Yūya Saitō	Yūya Saitō
2.	"Sansan Gogo" (サンサンGOGO lit. In Threes and Fives)	2°C	Katsuya Yoshida	Katsuya Yoshida
3.	"Anataboshi" (Instrumental)		Yūya Saitō	Yūya Saitō

=== DVD single ===
No.	Title	Length
1.	"Anataboshi"
2.	"MilkyWay's One Point Dance Lesson" (MilkyWayのワンポイントダンスレッスン)
3.	"Anataboshi" (Dance Shot Ver.)
4.	"Making of" (メイキング映像)

== Charts ==
=== Single ===
Chart	Peak position
Oricon Weekly Singles Chart	3
Billboard Japan Hot 100	24

=== DVD single ===
Chart	Peak position
Oricon Weekly DVD Chart	22
