= Mitsuboshi =

Studio album by Kirari Tsukishima starring Koharu Kusumi (Morning Musume)
- Released: February 28, 2007
- Recorded: 2006–2007
- Genre: J-pop
- Length: 40:39
- Label: Zetima

Kirari Tsukishima starring Koharu Kusumi (Morning Musume) chronology
Mitsuboshi (2007)	Kirarin Land (2007)

Kirarin Revolution chronology
Kirarin Revolution Original Soundtrack Vol.1 (2006)	Mitsuboshi (2007)	Kirarin Revolution Song Selection 2 (2007)

Singles from Mitsuboshi
- 1. "Koi Kana" Released: July 12, 2006; 2. "Balalaika" Released: October 25, 2006

Mitsuboshi (みつぼし; stylized as ☆☆☆) is the debut studio album of the character Kirari Tsukishima from the Japanese anime Kirarin Revolution. The album was released on February 28, 2007, with songs performed by Koharu Kusumi from Morning Musume, credited as "Kirari Tsukishima starring Koharu Kusumi (Morning Musume)" (月島きらり starring 久住小春(モーニング娘。)).

== Background and release ==
Mitsuboshi is the debut studio album of the character Kirari Tsukishima from Kirarin Revolution. Morning Musume member Koharu Kusumi, who provides her voice, is credited as "Kirari Tsukishima starring Koharu Kusumi (Morning Musume)" (月島きらり starring 久住小春(モーニング娘。)). Aside from containing new original songs, the album compiles songs from her previous singles, "Koi Kana" and "Balalaika."

An Nakahara, the creator of Kirarin Revolution, wrote the lyrics to "Koi Hanabi." The lyrics appear in volume 6 of the manga.

The album was released on February 28, 2007, under the Zetima label. The limited edition featured an alternate cover and a Happy Idol Life Kurikira Card from Kirarin Revolution. The regular edition came with a 16-page photobook as its first press bonus.

== Reception ==
The album debuted at #16 in the Oricon Weekly Albums Chart and charted for 10 weeks.

== Track listing ==
No.	Title	Lyrics	Music	Arrangement	Length
1.	"Balalaika (バラライカ, Bararaika)"	Bulge	Shigeki Sako	Shigeki Sako	3:38
2.	"Koi Kana (恋☆カナ)"	Shin Furuya	Tetsurō Oda	Masaki Iehara	3:32
3.	"Hoshi no Shizuku (星のしずく)"	Hirotake Onishi	Tōru Watanabe	Tōru Watanabe	3:56
4.	"Mizuiro Melody (水色メロディ, Mizuiro Merodi)"	Shin Furuya	Katsuhiko Kurosu	Daisuke Katō	3:34
5.	"Koi Hanabi (恋花火)"	An Nakahara, a2c	a2c	Katsuyuki Harada, a2c	4:47
6.	"Spaghetti"	Bounceback	Bounceback	Bounceback	3:43
7.	"Love da yo Darling (Loveだよ☆ダーリン, Love da yo Dārin)"	Chieko Suyama	Katsuya Yoshida	Katsuya Yoshida	3:21
8.	"I miss you"	Akirastar	Akirastar	Akirastar	4:48
9.	"Everyday Precious Day"	Yūta Nakano, Kenko-p	Yūta Nakano	ats-, Yūta Nakano	4:34
10.	"Sugao-flavor"	Michito	Tetsurō Oda	Kōji Gotō	4:51
Total length:					40:39

== Charts ==
Chart	Peak position
Oricon Weekly Albums Chart	16
