= Kirarin Land =

Studio album by Kirari Tsukishima starring Koharu Kusumi (Morning Musume)
- Released: December 19, 2007
- Recorded: 2007
- Genre: J-pop
- Length: 41:03
- Label: Zetima

Kirari Tsukishima starring Koharu Kusumi (Morning Musume) chronology
| Mitsuboshi (2007) | Kirarin Land (2007) | Kirari to Fuyu (2008) |

Kirarin Revolution chronology
| Kirarin Revolution Song Selection 2 (2007) | Kirarin Land (2007) | Kirarin Revolution Song Selection 3 (2008) |

Singles from Kirarin Land
- 1. "Happy" Released: May 2, 2007; 2. "Hana o Pūn / Futari wa NS" Released: August 1, 2007; 3. "Chance!" Released: November 7, 2007

Kirarin Land (きらりん☆ランド, Kirarin Rando) is the second studio album of the character Kirari Tsukishima from the Japanese anime Kirarin Revolution. The album was released on December 19, 2007, with songs performed by Koharu Kusumi from Morning Musume, credited as "Kirari Tsukishima starring Koharu Kusumi (Morning Musume)" (月島きらり starring 久住小春(モーニング娘。)).

== Background and release ==
Kirarin Land is the second studio album of the character Kirari Tsukishima from Kirarin Revolution. Morning Musume member Koharu Kusumi, who provides her voice, is credited as "Kirari Tsukishima starring Koharu Kusumi (Morning Musume)" (月島きらり starring 久住小春(モーニング娘。)). Aside from containing new original songs, the album compiles songs from her previous singles, "Happy" and "Chance!", as well as "Hana o Pūn" and "Futari wa NS", her duets with Mai Hagiwara from Cute under the name Kira Pika. "Olala", the ending theme song from January 2008 to March 2008 for Kirarin Revolution, was used as Kirarin Land's promotional track.

The album was released on December 19, 2007, under the Zetima label. The limited edition featured an alternate cover, DVD exclusives, and a Happy Idol Life Kurikira Card from Kirarin Revolution. The regular edition came with a large sticker as its first press bonus.

== Reception ==
The album debuted at #17 in the Oricon Weekly Albums Chart and charted for 7 weeks.

Editors at Barks reviewed the album favorably, noting that it was "rich in variety" and comparing some of the songs to French pop music. Kirarin Land was called an album that "not only Morning Musume fans can enjoy, but also children, the target demographic of Kirarin Revolution", citing the album-original song "Konnichipa" as an example of clever uses of word play. In contrast, Kira Pika's ballad "Futari wa NS" was also highlighted as an album favorite, with Barks insisting that the album is a good opportunity to listen to the song for fans who missed the single release. Barks also praised the art direction of the album, claiming that it was "worth buying just to see [Kusumi's] photos in the lyrics booklet."

== Track listing ==
Album
| No. | Title | Lyrics | Music | Arrangement | Length |
|---|---|---|---|---|---|
| 1. | "Happy (ハッピー☆彡, Happī)" | Bounceback | Bounceback | Bounceback | 3:59 |
| 2. | "Chance! (チャンス!, Chansu!)" | 2°C | Tetsurō Oda | Masaki Iehara | 3:37 |
| 3. | "Olala" | Kanae Koyama | Tomokazu Tashiro | Yōichirō Yasuoka | 3:15 |
| 4. | "Himawari (ヒマワリ)" | Chisato Nishimura | Shinya Saitō | Shinya Saitō | 3:27 |
| 5. | "Konnichipa (こんにちぱ)" | YumYum | MenMen | MenMen | 3:11 |
| 6. | "Very! Berry! Strawberry!" | Minori | Yūya Saitō | Yūya Saitō | 3:30 |
| 7. | "Hana o Pūn (はなをぷーん)" (Kira Pika) | YumYum | MenMen | Jirō Miyanaga, MenMen | 4:28 |
| 8. | "Koi no Mahō wa Habibi no Bi! (恋の魔法はハビビのビ!)" | Chieko Suyama, Katsuya Yoshida | Katsuya Yoshida | Katsuya Yoshida | 3:43 |
| 9. | "Futari wa NS (ふたりはNS)" (Kira Pika) | YumYum | MenMen | Jirō Miyanaga | 4:40 |
| 10. | "Ramutara (ラムタラ)" | 2°C | Yūya Saitō | Yūya Saitō | 3:35 |
| 11. | "Shiawase Clover (幸せクローバー, Shiawase Kurōbā)" | Minori | Yūya Saitō | Yūya Saitō | 3:43 |
| Total length: | | | | | 41:03 |

Limited edition DVD
| No. | Title | Length |
|---|---|---|
| 1. | "Happy" (Happy Lip Ver.) |
| 2. | "Happy" (Live Ver.) |
| 3. | "Hana o Pūn" (Close-up Ver.) |
| 4. | "Futari wa NS" (Live Ver.) |
| 5. | "Chance!" (Close-up Ver.) |

== Charts ==
| Chart | Peak position |
|---|---|
| Oricon Weekly Albums Chart | 17 |
