= Kimi ga Iru =

Single by Ships

from the album Kirarin Revolution Song Selection 5
- A-side: "Kimi ga Iru"
- B-side: "Sayonara no Ring A Ring"
- Released: November 26, 2008
- Recorded: 2008
- Genre: J-pop
- Length: 12:26
- Label: Zetima
- Songwriter: Naruya Ihashi

Ships singles chronology
"Tokyo Friend Ships" (2008)	"Kimi ga Iru" (2008)

Kirarin Revolution singles chronology
"Tan Tan Tān!" (2008)	"Kimi ga Iru" (2008)	"Happy Happy Sunday!" (2009)

"Kimi ga Iru" (きみがいる; lit. "I Have You") is an insert song from the Japanese anime Kirarin Revolution. The song was released on November 26, 2008, and is performed by Ships, consisting of Takuya Ide and Shikou Kanai as their characters, Hiroto Kazama and Seiji Hiwatari.

== Background and release ==
"Kimi ga Iru" is an insert song from Kirarin Revolution and is performed by Takuya Ide and Shikou Kanai, who voice Hiroto Kazama and Seiji Hiwatari, fictional characters from the show who are part of the in-universe group Ships. The song was released as the characters' second single. "Kimi ga Iru" is a ballad, a departure from the upbeat melody from Ships' previous single, "Tokyo Friend Ships."

The single was released on November 26, 2008, under the Zetima label. "Sayonara no Ring a Ring" was included as a B-side and is also performed by Ships. The song is described as a "Christmas song about a lost love."

To promote the song, Oha Suta aired live-action episodic segments titled "Kimi ga Iru" from November 25, 2008, to December 1, 2008. The episode is a fictional account behind how the music video for "Kimi ga Iru" was filmed, where Hiroto and Seiji befriend a snow fairy named Lareine. The actors reprised their roles from the show.

== Music video ==
The music video features Ide and Kanai as their characters, Hiroto Kazama and Seiji Hiwatari, singing. Near the end of the video, crystals from Lareine shower upon them. The music video was given a home release on the limited-edition version of the CD album Kirarin Revolution Song Selection 5.

== Reception ==
The CD single debuted at #140 in the Oricon Weekly Singles Chart.

== Track listing ==
No.	Title	Lyrics	Music	Length
1.	"Kimi ga Iru" (きみがいる lit. I Have You)	Naruya Ihashi	Naruya Ihashi	4:04
2.	"Sayonara no Ring A Ring" (さよならのRing A Ring lit. Goodbye Ring A Ring)	Yoshinori Sato	Jun Asahi	4:19
3.	"Kimi ga Iru" (Instrumental)		Naruya Ihashi	4:05
Total length:				12:26

== Charts ==
Chart	Peak position
Oricon Weekly Singles Chart	140
