= Papancake =

- Regular edition cover

Single by Kirari Tsukishima starring Koharu Kusumi (Morning Musume)

from the album Kirari to Fuyu
- A-side: "Papancake"
- B-side: "Oh! Tomodachi"
- Released: July 16, 2008 (CD single); July 30, 2008 (DVD single)
- Recorded: 2008
- Genre: J-pop
- Label: Zetima
- Songwriters: Fireworks (track 1); Bounceback (track 2)
- Lyricist: 2°C

Kirari Tsukishima starring Koharu Kusumi (Morning Musume) singles chronology
| "Chance!" (2007) | "Papancake" (00000001) | "Happy Happy Sunday!" (2009) |

Kirarin Revolution singles chronology
| "Tokyo Friend Ships" (2008) | "Papancake" (2008) | "Tan Tan Tān!" (2008) |

"Papancake" (パパンケーキ, Papankēki) is the eleventh ending theme song from the Japanese anime Kirarin Revolution. The song was released on February 4, 2009, and is performed by Koharu Kusumi from Morning Musume, credited as "Kirari Tsukishima starring Koharu Kusumi (Morning Musume)" (月島きらり starring 久住小春(モーニング娘。)). The song was released as Kirari Tsukishima's fifth single, who Kusumi portrays in the show.

== Background and release ==
"Papancake" is the eleventh ending theme song to Kirarin Revolution and is performed by Koharu Kusumi from Morning Musume, who voices the main character, Kirari Tsukishima. The song was released as the character's fifth single and Kusumi is credited as "Kirari Tsukishima starring Koharu Kusumi (Morning Musume)" (月島きらり starring 久住小春(モーニング娘。)).

The single was released on July 16, 2008, under the Zetima label. "Oh! Tomodachi" was included as a B-side and is also performed by Kusumi under her character's name. The limited edition featured an alternate cover and came with an exclusive Kirarin Revolution: Kuru Kira Idol Days trading card, while the regular edition included a large sticker as its first press bonus.

A video single, referred as a "Single V", was released on July 30, 2008.

== Music video ==
The music video was directed by Toshiyuki Suzuki and features Kusumi dressed up as her character, Kirari Tsukishima.

== Reception ==
The CD single debuted at #11 in the Oricon Weekly Singles Chart and charted for 7 weeks. The video single charted at #23 on the Oricon Weekly DVD Charts and charted for 2 weeks.

== Track listing ==
=== Single ===
| No. | Title | Lyrics | Music | Arrangement | Length |
|---|---|---|---|---|---|
| 1. | "Papancake" (パパンケーキ) | 2°C | Fireworks | Jirō Miyanaga |
| 2. | "Oh! Tomodachi" (Oh!トモダチ lit. Oh! My Friend) | 2°C | Bounceback | Bounceback |
| 3. | "Papancake" (Instrumental) | | Fireworks | Jirō Miyanaga |

=== DVD single ===
| No. | Title | Length |
|---|---|---|
| 1. | "Papancake" |
| 2. | "Kirari Tsukishima's One Point Dance Lesson" (月島きらりのワンポイントダンスレッスン) |
| 3. | "Papancake" (Dance Shot Ver.) |
| 4. | "Making of" (メイキング映像) |

== Charts ==
=== Single ===
| Chart | Peak position |
|---|---|
| Oricon Weekly Singles Chart | 11 |
| Billboard Japan Hot 100 | 64 |

=== DVD single ===
| Chart | Peak position |
|---|---|
| Oricon Weekly DVD Chart | 23 |
