= Cocoa Otoko =

Japanese rock group

Cocoa Otoko ココア男。
- Origin: Japan
- Genres: Pop rock
- Years active: 2010-2012
- Labels: Avex Trax
- Past members: Kenta Kamakari; Kei Hosogai; Kosuke Yonehara; Shogo Suzuki; Takuya Ide
- Website: www.avexnet.or.jp/cocoaotoko

Cocoa Otoko (ココア男。, Kokoa Otoko, Chocolate Men) was a Japanese rock group that was active between April 2010 and March 2012. The band consisted of five actors, namely Kenta Kamakari (lead vocals), Kei Hosogai (bass), Kosuke Yonehara (drums), Shogo Suzuki (guitar), and Takuya Ide (keyboard and rap).

== History ==
Cocoa Otoko was put together on the romance variety show Ikemen Deru no Hōsoku in 2009. Prior to the group's formation, all of the members were active in entertainment as actors or singers in other groups. They released their debut single, "Amai Wana Nigai Uso...", on April 15, 2010.

The band's name was decided because the members all like chocolate (ココア, Cocoa) and they are all men (男, Otoko).

On December 5, 2011, Cocoa Otoko announced that they were disbanding in March 2012, citing interest in other career paths. The group held their final performance on March 31, 2012.

== Discography ==
=== Studio albums ===
Title	Year	Album details	Peak chart positions		Sales
Title	Year	Album details	JPN	JPN Hot	Sales
Premium Cocoa	2012	Released: January 11, 2012; Label: Avex Trax; Formats: CD, digital download	14	TBA	—
"—" denotes releases that did not chart or were not released in that region.

=== Extended plays ===
Title	Year	Album details	Peak chart positions		Sales
Title	Year	Album details	JPN	JPN Hot	Sales
Rich Cocoa	2010	Released: December 1, 2010; Label: Avex Trax; Formats: CD, digital download	33	TBA	—
"—" denotes releases that did not chart or were not released in that region.

=== Singles ===
Title	Year	Peak chart positions		Sales	Album
Title	Year	JPN	JPN Hot	Sales	Album
"Amai Wana Nigai Uso..." (甘い罠 苦い嘘、、、)	2010	15	—	—	Rich Cocoa
"Let Me Free (Gōin na Hodo)" (Let me free ～強引なほど、、) / "Cross Mind"	2010	17	—	—	Rich Cocoa
"Soldier" / "No You! No Life! No... XX?" (feat. Me)	2011	16	—	—	Premium Cocoa
"Harikiri Megami" (ハリキリ女神)	2011	12	—	—	Premium Cocoa
"Sayonara Janakute..." (さよならじゃなくて…) / "Seishun Outa" (/青春応歌)	2011	21	—	—	Premium Cocoa
"Kiseki (Time to Go)" (軌跡 ～Time to go～)	2012	18	—	—	Premium Cocoa
"—" denotes releases that did not chart or were not released in that region.

=== DVD ===
- Heaven's Rock (2010)
- MOTEL ~Hoshigaru Danjo no mote gaku~ DVD box (2011)
- LOG×MEN - COCOA OTOKO. - Digest ver. (2012)
