= Cheerfu11y =

- Film poster
- Directed by: Sho Tsukikawa
- Written by: Sho Tsukikawa
- Produced by: Izumi Bandō; Shin'ya Noda
- Starring: You Kikkawa; Akari Hayami; Anna Tamai; Naomi Anzai; Kaho Sakuma
- Cinematography: Yukibumi Jōsha
- Edited by: Sho Tsukikawa
- Music by: Michitomo
- Production company: Big Bird Films
- Distributed by: Universal Music Japan
- Release date: October 22, 2011 (Japan)
- Running time: 80 minutes
- Country: Japan
- Language: Japanese

Cheerfu11y (Japanese: Cheerfu11y チアフリー) is a 2011 Japanese cheerleading film directed by Sho Tsukikawa.

The movie served as Universal Music Japan's second movie in the Japanese movie market, following the success of its first offering, the action film Run 60.

== Cast ==
- You Kikkawa
- Akari Hayami
- Anna Tamai
- Naomi Anzai
- Kaho Sakuma
- Shiori Mori
- Konatsu Furukawa
- Saki Mori
- Yurika Akiyama
- Yuki Goto
- Mikiho Niwa
