= Ripe for the Picking =

Japanese manga series

- First tankōbon volume cover

瓜を破る (Uri o Waru)
- Genre: Drama; Romance
- Manga
- Written by: Azusa Itakura
- Published by: Houbunsha
- English publisher: NA: MangaPlaza
- Magazine: Weekly Manga Times
- Original run: July 3, 2020 – present
- Volumes: 14
- Television drama
- Directed by: Yūichirō Sakashita; Yuka Eda
- Written by: Satoko Okazaki; Mikiko Takahashi
- Studio: C&I Entertainment
- Original network: TBS
- Original run: January 23, 2024 – March 19, 2024
- Episodes: 9
- icon

Ripe for the Picking (瓜を破る, Uri o Waru) is a Japanese manga series written and illustrated by Azusa Itakura. It was originally published as a one-shot in Houbunsha's Weekly Manga Times magazine in April 2020. It later began full serialization in the same magazine in July 2020. A live-action television drama adaptation aired from January to March 2024.

== Plot ==
Maiko Kōsaka is an office lady. She is over 30 years old, but she has a complex over not yet having a sexual experience. Other people treat the experience normally, but she is growing impatient over not having experienced it in real life yet. Because of this, she meets the company office automation manager Senri Kagiya at work to work on a copier.

After that, their romantic relationship develops, and surrounding people's romantic circumstances are drawn.

== Media ==
=== Manga ===
Written and illustrated by Azusa Itakura, Ripe for the Picking was initially published as a one-shot in Houbunsha's Weekly Manga Times magazine on April 17, 2020. It later began full serialization in the same magazine on July 3 of the same year.

The series is published in English on NTT Solmare's MangaPlaza website.

No.	Release date	ISBN
1	April 15, 2021	978-4-83-223821-3
2	May 13, 2021	978-4-83-223828-2
3	August 16, 2021	978-4-83-223849-7
4	January 15, 2022	978-4-83-223885-5
5	July 14, 2022	978-4-83-223930-2
6	December 15, 2022	978-4-83-223961-6
7	May 16, 2023	978-4-83-223992-0
8	October 16, 2023	978-4-83-220331-0
9	March 14, 2024	978-4-83-220379-2
10	September 13, 2024	978-4-83-220434-8
11	February 14, 2025	978-4-83-220478-2
12	July 14, 2025	978-4-83-220526-0
13	December 12, 2025	978-4-83-220573-4
14	July 14, 2026	978-4-83-220633-5

=== Drama ===
A live-action television drama adaptation was announced on October 6, 2023. The drama is produced by C&I Entertainment and directed by Yūichirō Sakashita and Yuka Eda, with Satoko Okazaki and Mikiko Takahashi writing the scripts. The series stars Koharu Kusumi and Taiki Sato from Fantastics from Exile Tribe in the lead roles. It aired on TBS' Drama Stream programming block from January 23 to March 19, 2024.

== Reception ==
The series has over 2.1 million copies in circulation as of October 2023.
