= Niji-iro Prism Girl =

Japanese manga series

にじいろ☆プリズムガール
- Genre: Romance
- Manga
- Written by: An Nakahara
- Published by: Shogakukan
- Magazine: Ciao
- Original run: September 3, 2010 – December 6, 2013
- Volumes: 7
- Original video animation
- Music by: Tomori Kudō
- Studio: SynergySP
- Released: August 3, 2013 - December 3, 2013
- Runtime: 12 minutes
- Episodes: 4

Niji-iro Prism Girl (にじいろ☆プリズムガール, Niji-iro Purizumu Gāru; lit. "Rainbow Prism Girl") is a Japanese shōjo manga series written and illustrated by An Nakahara. An OVA adaptation was released in 2013.

== Plot ==
The beautiful and tall Nijika Kohinata is a 6th grade kid who doesn't look her age and daughter of an office chief of a TV station, avoids the entertainment world since her mom, a legendary actress, died from a sickness. Hiding the truth about her family, Nijika keeps another secret. The fact that she's living with the prince-like actor, Tōya Ichinose, may create a ruckus if it is discovered.

Running for another errand, Nijika, together with her pet Kapitama, coincidentally run into a drama set that's lacking an actress due to food poisoning.

== Characters ==
Nijika Kohinata (小日向虹架, Kohinata Nijika)
Voiced by: Arisa Nishiguchi
Tōya Ichinose (一ノ瀬透也, Ichinose Tōya)
Voiced by: Ryōta Ōsaka

== Media ==
=== Manga ===
Niji-iro Prism Girl is written and illustrated by An Nakahara. It was serialized in the monthly magazine Ciao from the October 2010 issue released on September 3, 2010, to the January 2014 issue released on December 6, 2014. The chapters were later released in 7 bound volumes by Shogakukan under the Ciao Comics imprint.
