= Hana o Pūn / Futari wa NS =

2007 single by Kira Pika

- Regular edition cover

Single by Kira Pika

from the album Kirarin Land
- Released: August 1, 2007 (CD single); August 8, 2007 (DVD single)
- Recorded: 2007
- Genre: J-pop
- Length: 18:04
- Label: Zetima
- Composer: MenMen
- Lyricist: YumYum

Kirarin Revolution singles chronology
"Happy" (2007)	"Hana o Pūn / Futari wa NS" (2007)	"Chance!" (2007)

Music video
- "Hana o Pūn" / "Futari wa NS" (15-second ad) on YouTube

"Hana o Pūn" / "Futari wa NS" (はなをぷーん/ふたりはNS; lit. "Thumb Your Nose" / "We are North and South") is a double A-side single featuring the opening and ending theme songs from the Japanese anime series Kirarin Revolution. The single was released on August 1, 2007, and is performed by Kira Pika (きら☆ぴか), consisting of Koharu Kusumi from Morning Musume and Mai Hagiwara from Cute acting as their characters, Kirari Tsukishima and Hikaru Mizuki.

== Background and release ==
Morning Musume member Koharu Kusumi starred in Kirarin Revolution as the main character, Kirari Tsukishima. Cute member Mai Hagiwara had a guest role on the show from June 2007 to September 2007 as Hikaru Mizuki, an original character made for the show. In the story, Kirari becomes Hikaru's mentor by being in an idol subgroup together as Kira Pika (きら☆ぴか).

In addition to "Hana o Pūn" and "Futari wa NS" being released as the characters' duets in the show, "Hana o Pūn" is the fourth opening and sixth ending theme song to Kirarin Revolution. "Futari wa NS", the seventh ending theme song to Kirarin Revolution, was included as the second A-side and is also performed by Kira Pika. The song is a ballad. To promote the single, Oha Suta aired live-action episodic segments titled "Kira Pika Story" from July 4, 2007, to July 18, 2007, with the actresses reprising their roles from the show.

The single was released on August 1, 2007, under the Zetima label. A video single, referred as a "Single V", was released on August 8, 2007.

== Music video ==
Music videos for both songs were released with the video single. The music video for "Hana o Pūn" shows Kusumi and Hagiwara dressed up as their characters, Kirari Tsukishima and Hikaru Mizuki. The back-up dancers wore pig noses to emphasize the "nose" theme. The dance's choreography focuses on thumbing the nose in triumph during the chorus.

== Performances ==
A promotional concert event titled "Kira Pika: Hana o Pūn Summer Live" was held on July 26, 2007. Both songs were performed during Kirarin Revolution's final concert event on May 4, 2009, where Hagiwara appeared as a special guest.

After Kirarin Revolution ended, Kusumi and Hagiwara briefly reunited on Momoiro Clover Z's variety show Kōnosuke Sakazaki's Pink Folk Village Next (坂崎幸之助のももいろフォーク村NEXT, Sakazaki Kōnosuke no Momoiro Fōku Mura Nekusuto) on November 19, 2015, and performed "Futari wa NS."

== Reception ==
The CD single debuted at #9 in the Oricon Weekly Singles Chart. The video single charted at #27 on the Oricon Weekly DVD Charts.

Editors at Barks praised "Hana o Pūn" for its catchy melody and called it a "stand-out" of the summer 2007 season, attributing part of its quirkiness to the music video. The song's catchiness was compared to "Odoru Pompokolin" from Chibi Maruko-chan. Barks also reviewed "Futari wa NS" favorably and mentioned that it showed a different side to Kusumi and Hagiwara.

== Track listing ==
=== Single ===
No.	Title	Lyrics	Music	Arrangement	Length
1.	"Hana o Pūn" (はなをぷーん lit. Thumb Your Nose)	YumYum (Yumiko Tsuji)	MenMen	Jirō Miyanaga; MenMen	4:27
2.	"Futari wa NS" (ふたりはNS lit. We are North and South)	Yum Yum (Yumiko Tsuji)	MenMen	Jirō Miyanaga	4:39
3.	"Hana o Pūn" (Instrumental)	—	MenMen	Jirō Miyanaga; MenMen	4:27
4.	"Futari wa NS" (Instrumental)	—	MenMen	Jirō Miyanaga	4:32
Total length:					18:05

=== DVD single ===
No.	Title	Length
1.	"Hana o Pūn"
2.	"Futari wa NS"
3.	"Making Of" (メイキング映像)

== Charts ==
=== Single ===
Chart	Peak position
Oricon Weekly Singles Chart	9

=== DVD single ===
Chart	Peak position
Oricon Weekly DVD Chart	27
