= Kenta Kamakari =

Japanese actor and singer (born 1984)

- 鎌苅 健太
- Born: February 17, 1984 (age 42); Osaka, Japan
- Occupations: Actor; singer
- Musical career
- Genres: J-pop
- Instrument: Vocals
- Years active: 2005–present
- Formerly of: Cocoa Otoko

Kenta Kamakari (鎌苅 健太, Kamakari Kenta; born on February 17, 1984, in Osaka Prefecture) is a Japanese actor, voice actor and singer, famous for his role as Ryo Shishido in the Prince of Tennis Musicals. He was hospitalized on April 21, 2007, and was unable to play the role of Minami Itsuki in Musical Air Gear vs. Bacchus Super Range Remix and appear in Dream Live 4 – Extra. As he mentioned in his blog, as of February 2008 he is completely recovered and will start working again. He is the leader and lead vocals for the rock band Cocoa Otoko that debuted on 2010, yet disbanded again. In 2017, he married model and actress Yuria Haga.

== Stage performances ==
- The Busaiku (2005)
- TeniMyu: The Imperial Match Hyotei Gakuen (2005) as Shishido Ryou
- TeniMyu: The Imperial Match Hyotei Gakuen in Winter (2005–2006) as Shishido Ryou
- TeniMyu: Dream Live 3rd (2006) as Shishido Ryou
- TeniMyu: Advancement Match Rokkaku feat. Hyotei Gakuen (2006) as Shishido Ryou
- Musical Air Gear (2007/01/7-14, 2007/01/19-21) as Minami Itsuki
- TeniMyu: The Imperial Presence Hyotei Gakuen feat. Higachuu (2008) as Shishido Ryou
- Musical Air Gear: Musical Air Gear vs. Bacchus Top Gear Remix (2010) as Minami Itsuki
- Show by Rock!!: Live Musical "Show by Rock!!" – The Fes II-Thousand XVII and (2017) as Shu☆Zo
- Moriarty the Patriot: Musical Moriarty the Patriot (2019) as John H. Watson
- Hyper Projection Engeki: Haikyu!! (2019-2021) as Ittetsu Takeda
- Moriarty the Patriot: Musical Moriarty the Patriot Op.2 A Scandal in British Empire (2020) as John H. Watson
- Moriarty the Patriot: Musical Moriarty the Patriot Op.3 The Phantom of Whitechapel (2021) as John H. Watson

== Films ==
- The Prince of Tennis: brief appearance as Sasabe's Friend
- Arakure Knight (2007)
- Shinjukuku Kabukichou Hoikuen (2009)

== TV dramas ==
- Tsubasa no Oreta Tenshitachi (Fuji TV, 2006) cameo
- Princess Princess D (TV Asahi, 2006) as Mikoto Yutaka
- Happy Boys (Avex Entertainment, 2007) as Akasaka Junta
- Oretachi wa Tenshi da! No Angel No Luck (TV Tokyo, 2009) as Darts
- Heaven's Rock (KTV, 2010) as Teppei
- Hanawake no Yon shimai (TBS, 2011)
- Kamen Rider Gotchard, (TV Asahi, 2023–2024) as Glion

== Anime television series ==
- Air Gear - voice of Minami Itsuki
- Katekyo Hitman Reborn! - season one voice of Dino Cavallone
- Holy Talker - voice of Takayama Renga
- Lovely Complex - voice of Kohori Kazuki
- My Hero Academia - voice of Edgeshot (Shinya Kamihara)

== Radio shows ==
- MabeRadio with Kazuki Kato and Chieko Higuchi
- Maberaji W with Renn Kiriyama and Chieko Higuchi
- KiraKira Radio (Web Radio)
