= Chance! (Koharu Kusumi song) =

- Regular edition cover

Single by Kirari Tsukishima starring Koharu Kusumi (Morning Musume)

from the album Kirarin Land
- A-side: "Chance!"
- B-side: "Ramutara"
- Released: November 7, 2007 (CD single, limited edition); November 28, 2007 (CD single, regular edition); December 10, 2007 (DVD single)
- Recorded: 2007
- Genre: J-pop
- Label: Zetima
- Songwriters: Tetsurō Oda (track 1); Yūya Saitō (track 2)
- Lyricist: 2°C

Kirari Tsukishima starring Koharu Kusumi (Morning Musume) singles chronology
"Happy" (2007)	"Chance!" (2007)	"Papancake" (2008)

Kirarin Revolution singles chronology
"Hana o Pūn / Futari wa NS" (2007)	"Chance!" (2007)	"Anataboshi" (2008)

"Chance!" (チャンス！, Chansu!) is the fifth opening theme song from the Japanese anime Kirarin Revolution. The song was released on November 7, 2007, and is performed by Koharu Kusumi from Morning Musume, credited as "Kirari Tsukishima starring Koharu Kusumi (Morning Musume)" (月島きらり starring 久住小春(モーニング娘。)). The song was released as Kirari Tsukishima's fourth single, who Kusumi portrays in the show.

== Background and release ==
"Chance!" is the fifth opening theme song to Kirarin Revolution and is performed by Koharu Kusumi from Morning Musume, who voices the main character, Kirari Tsukishima. The song was released as the character's fourth single and Kusumi is credited as "Kirari Tsukishima starring Koharu Kusumi (Morning Musume)" (月島きらり starring 久住小春(モーニング娘。)).

The limited edition of single was released on November 7, 2007, under the Zetima label, while the regular edition was released on November 28, 2007. "Ramutara", the eighth ending theme song to Kirarin Revolution, was included as a B-side and is also performed by Kusumi under her character's name.

The limited edition featured an alternate cover and an exclusive version of Takara Tomy's paper doll Millefeui Card from Kirarin Revolution, while the first press bonus for the regular edition came with a large sticker.

A video single, referred as a "Single V", was released on December 10, 2007.

== Music video ==
The music video was directed by Toshiyuki Suzuki and features Kusumi dressed up as Kirari Tsukishima. A key feature in the video's art direction and choreography is when Kusumi pulls apart her dress after the instrumental break to reveal a long, red dress underneath.

== Reception ==
The CD single debuted at #9 in the Oricon Weekly Singles Chart and charted for 11 weeks. (Note: The limited edition of the single was released on November 7, 2007, while the regular edition was released on November 28, 2007. Oricon listed and ranked the CD single based on the regular edition's release date.) The video single charted at #33 on the Oricon Weekly DVD Charts and charted for 2 weeks.

== Track listing ==
=== Single ===
No.	Title	Lyrics	Music	Arrangement	Length
1.	"Chance!" (チャンス！)	2°C	Tetsurō Oda	Masaki Iehara
2.	"Ramutara" (ラムタラ)	2°C	Yūya Saitō	Yūya Saitō
3.	"Chance!" (Instrumental)		Tetsurō Oda	Masaki Iehara

=== DVD single ===
No.	Title	Length
1.	"Chance!"
2.	"Chance!" (Dance Shot Ver.)
3.	"Making of" (メイキング映像)

== Charts ==
=== Single ===
Chart	Peak position
Oricon Weekly Singles Chart	9

=== DVD single ===
Chart	Peak position
Oricon Weekly DVD Chart	33
