= Koi Kana =

- Regular edition cover

Single by Kirari Tsukishima starring Koharu Kusumi (Morning Musume)

from the album Mitsuboshi
- A-side: "Koi Kana"
- B-side: "Sugao-flavor"
- Released: July 12, 2006 (CD single); August 7, 2006 (DVD single)
- Recorded: 2006
- Genre: J-pop
- Length: 16:50
- Label: Zetima
- Composer: Tetsurō Oda
- Lyricists: Makoto Furuya (track 1); Michito (track 2)

Kirari Tsukishima starring Koharu Kusumi (Morning Musume) singles chronology
"Koi Kana" (00000001)	"Balalaika" (2006)

Kirarin Revolution singles chronology
"Koi Kana" (2006)	"Balalaika" (2006)

Music video
- "Koi Kana" on YouTube

"Koi Kana" (恋☆カナ) is the first opening theme song to the Japanese anime Kirarin Revolution. The song was released on July 12, 2006, and is performed by Koharu Kusumi from Morning Musume, credited as "Kirari Tsukishima starring Koharu Kusumi (Morning Musume)" (月島きらり starring 久住小春(モーニング娘。)). The song was released as Kirari Tsukishima's first single, who Kusumi portrays in the show.

== Background and release ==
"Koi Kana" is the first opening theme song from Kirarin Revolution and is performed by Koharu Kusumi from Morning Musume, who voices the main character, Kirari Tsukishima. The song was released as the character's debut single and Kusumi is credited as "Kirari Tsukishima starring Koharu Kusumi (Morning Musume)" (月島きらり starring 久住小春(モーニング娘。)).

The single was released on July 12, 2006, under the Zetima label. "Sugao-flavor", the first ending theme song to Kirarin Revolution, was included as a B-side and is also performed by Kusumi under her character's name. The limited edition featured an alternate cover and came with a large sticker as its first press bonus.

A video single was released on August 7, 2006.

== Music video ==
The music video features Kusumi dressed up as her character, Kirari Tsukishima, and dancing in a room full of stars. A version featuring footage used for Kirarin Revolution's opening and the choreography were released with the video single.

== Reception ==
The CD single debuted at #12 in the Oricon Weekly Singles Chart. The single sold 18,125 copies on its first week and 38,650 copies in total. The video single charted at #30 on the Oricon Weekly DVD Charts.

== Cover version ==
A Finnish-language cover version of the song, "Se tunne", by Finnish singer Laura Vanamo, was released on March 25, 2009, by Poko Rekords.

== Track listing ==
=== Single ===
No.	Title	Lyrics	Music	Arrangement	Length
1.	"Koi Kana" (恋☆カナ lit. Is This Love?)	Makoto Furuya	Tetsurō Oda	Masaki Iehara	3:29
2.	"Sugao-flavor" (lit. Honest Flavor)	Michito	Tetsurō Oda	Yasuji Goto	4:50
3.	"Koi Kana" (Instrumental)		Tetsurō Oda	Masaki Iehara	3:29
4.	"Sugao-flavor" (Instrumental)		Tetsurō Oda	Yasuji Goto	4:50
Total length:					16:38

=== DVD single ===
No.	Title	Length
1.	"Koi Kana"
2.	"Koi Kana" (Anime Ver.)
3.	"Koi Kana" (Dance Shot Ver.)
4.	"Making Of" (Making Of (メイキング映像))

== Charts ==
=== Single ===
Chart	Peak position
Oricon Weekly Singles Chart	12

=== DVD single ===
Chart	Peak position
Oricon Weekly DVD Chart	30
