= Happy Happy Sunday! =

- Regular edition cover

Single by Kirari Tsukishima starring Koharu Kusumi (Morning Musume)

from the album Best Kirari
- A-side: "Happy Happy Sunday!"
- B-side: "Hatten Joy"
- Released: February 4, 2009 (CD single); February 11, 2009 (DVD single)
- Recorded: 2009
- Genre: J-pop
- Label: Zetima
- Songwriters: Kenichi Maeyamada (track 1); Keiroku Araki (track 2)
- Lyricists: Kenichi Maeyamada (track 1); Keiroku Araki (track 2)

Kirari Tsukishima starring Koharu Kusumi (Morning Musume) singles chronology
"Papancake" (2008)	"Happy Happy Sunday!" (00000001)

Kirarin Revolution singles chronology
"Kimi ga Iru" (2008)	"Happy Happy Sunday!" (2009)

Music video
- "Happy Happy Sunday!" (30-sec. ad) on YouTube

"Happy Happy Sunday!" (はぴ☆はぴ サンデー！, Hapi Hapi Sandē!) is the thirteenth ending theme song from the Japanese anime Kirarin Revolution. The song was released on February 4, 2009, and is performed by Koharu Kusumi from Morning Musume, credited as "Kirari Tsukishima starring Koharu Kusumi (Morning Musume)" (月島きらり starring 久住小春(モーニング娘。)). The song was released as Kirari Tsukishima's final single, who Kusumi portrays in the show.

== Background and release ==
"Happy Happy Sunday!" is the thirteenth ending theme song to Kirarin Revolution and is performed by Koharu Kusumi from Morning Musume, who voices the main character, Kirari Tsukishima. The song was released as the character's sixth single and Kusumi is credited as "Kirari Tsukishima starring Koharu Kusumi (Morning Musume)" (月島きらり starring 久住小春(モーニング娘。)). The song expresses the feelings of a girl before her first date.

The single was released on February 4, 2009, under the Zetima label. "Hatten Joy" was included as a B-side and is also performed by Kusumi under her character's name. The limited edition featured an alternate cover and came with an exclusive Kirarin Revolution: Kuru Kira Idol Days trading card.

A video single, referred as a "Single V", was released on February 11, 2009.

== Music video ==
The music video was directed by Toshiyuki Suzuki and features Kusumi dressed up as her character, Kirari Tsukishima. A key feature in the video's art direction and choreography is Kusumi pulling out a cape from the wings of her costume after the instrumental break.

== Reception ==
The CD single debuted at #9 in the Oricon Weekly Singles Chart and charted for 6 weeks. The video single charted at #30 on the Oricon Weekly DVD Charts and charted for 2 weeks.

Pirosue at Real Sound ranked "Happy Happy Sunday!" at #57 on the list of "Best Hello! Project Songs in the Past 20 Years."

== Track listing ==
=== Single ===
No.	Title	Lyrics	Music	Arrangement	Length
1.	"Happy Happy Sunday!" (はぴ☆はぴ サンデー！)	Kenichi Maeyamada	Kenichi Maeyamada	Kenichi Maeyamada
2.	"Hatten Joy" (ハッテン×JOY)	Keiroku Araki	Keiroku Araki	Keiroku Araki
3.	"Happy Happy Sunday!" (Instrumental)		Kenichi Maeyamada	Kenichi Maeyamada

=== DVD single ===
No.	Title	Length
1.	"Happy Happy Sunday!"
2.	"Kirari Tsukishima's One Point Dance Lesson" (月島きらりのワンポイントダンスレッスン)
3.	"Happy Happy Sunday!" (Dance Shot Ver.)
4.	"Making of" (メイキング映像)

== Charts ==
=== Single ===
Chart	Peak position
Oricon Weekly Singles Chart	9

=== DVD single ===
Chart	Peak position
Oricon Weekly DVD Chart	30
