= Balalaika (song) =

- Regular edition cover

Single by Kirari Tsukishima starring Koharu Kusumi (Morning Musume)

from the album Mitsuboshi
- A-side: "Balalaika"
- B-side: "Mizuiro Melody"
- Released: October 25, 2006 (CD single); November 8, 2006 (DVD single)
- Recorded: 2006
- Genre: J-pop
- Label: Zetima
- Songwriter(s): Shigeki Sako (track 1); Katsuhiko Kurosu (track 2)
- Lyricist(s): Bulge (track 1); Makoto Furuya (track 2)

Kirari Tsukishima starring Koharu Kusumi (Morning Musume) singles chronology
"Koi Kana" (2006)	"Balalaika" (2006)	"Happy" (2007)

Kirarin Revolution singles chronology
"Koi Kana" (2006)	"Balalaika" (2006)	"Happy" (2007)

Music video
- "Balalaika" on YouTube

"Balalaika" (バラライカ, Bararaika) is the second opening theme song from the Japanese anime Kirarin Revolution. The song was released on October 25, 2006 and is performed by Koharu Kusumi from Morning Musume, credited as "Kirari Tsukishima starring Koharu Kusumi (Morning Musume)" (月島きらり starring 久住小春(モーニング娘。)). The song was released as Kirari Tsukishima's second single, who Kusumi portrays in the show.

== Background and release ==
"Balalaika" is the second opening theme song to Kirarin Revolution and is performed by Koharu Kusumi from Morning Musume, who voices the main character, Kirari Tsukishima. The song was released as the character's second single and Kusumi is credited as "Kirari Tsukishima starring Koharu Kusumi (Morning Musume)" (月島きらり starring 久住小春(モーニング娘。)). The song borrows influences from Russian folk music.

The single was released on October 25, 2006, under the Zetima label. "Mizuiro Melody", the third ending theme song to Kirarin Revolution, was included as a B-side and performed by Kusumi under her character's name. The limited edition featured an alternate cover with an exclusive version of Takara Tomy's paper doll Millefeui Card from Kirarin Revolution.

A video single was released on November 8, 2006.

== Music video ==
The music video was directed by Hideo Kawatani and produced by Tetsushi Suehiro. It features Kusumi dressed up as her character, Kirari Tsukishima, and dancing at a magic show. A version featuring the choreography was released with the video single.

== Reception ==
The CD single debuted at #8 in the Oricon Weekly Singles Chart and charted for 23 weeks. The single sold 28,132 copies on its first week and 72,709 copies in total. The video single charted at #13 on the Oricon Weekly DVD Charts.

Editors at Barks noted that the song's "Hoo! Ha!" chanting reminded them of "Koi no Dance Site" by Morning Musume. In their review, they commented Kusumi's music video was "not erotic" compared to recent Hello! Project music videos, such as "Some Boys! Touch" by Maki Goto and "Melodies" by GAM. The editors noted that compared to their videos, Kusumi's image, physical features and smile evoked fond memories of "that girl you used to like" in elementary or middle school and exuded a "sparkle."

"Balalaika" became associated with the "Yaranaika?" Internet meme after a fan-made parody version with homoerotic lyrics was used as the meme's theme song.

== Track listing ==
=== Single ===
No.	Title	Lyrics	Music	Arrangement	Length
1.	"Balalaika" (バラライカ)	Bulge (Takahiro Hosoki, Rie Tanaka)	Shigeki Sako	Shigeki Sako
2.	"Mizuiro Melody" (水色メロディ lit. Aquamarine Melody)	Makoto Furuya	Katsuhiko Kurosu	Daisuke Kato
3.	"Balalaika" (Instrumental)		Shigeki Sako	Shigeki Sako

=== DVD single ===
No.	Title	Length
1.	"Balalaika"	3:42
2.	"Balalaika" (Dance Shot Ver.)
3.	"Making Of" (メイキング映像)

== Charts ==
=== Single ===
Chart	Peak position
Oricon Weekly Singles Chart	8

=== DVD single ===
Chart	Peak position
Oricon Weekly DVD Chart	13
