= An Nakahara =

Japanese manga artist

- Born: February 8, 1969 (age 57); Okayama Prefecture, Japan
- Occupation: Manga artist
- Years active: 2002–present
- Known for: Kirarin Revolution
- Awards: Shogakukan Manga Awards (2006)

An Nakahara (中原 杏, Nakahara An; born February 8, 1969) is a female Japanese shōjo manga artist. She is best known for her romantic comedy Kirarin Revolution series (2004–2009).

== List of manga ==
- Suki Suki Daisuki (すき♥すき♥だいすきっ) (2002)
- Zutto Suki Suki Daisuki (ず〜っと すき♥すき♥だいすきっ) (2003)
- Terepari Kiss (てれぱり♥きっす) (2002–03)
- Ijiwaru Love Devil (いじわる♥らぶデビル) (2003)
- Otona ni Narumon! (オトナになるもん!) (2003–04)
- Kirarin Revolution (きらりん☆レボリューション) (2004–09)
- Pinku Ouji to Yuutsu Hime (ピンク王子とゆううつ姫) (2007)
- Kirarin Revolution: Tokubetsuhen (きらりんレボリューション特別編) (2007)
- Kirarin Revolution: Kirari to Akarihen (きらりん☆レボリューション きらりとあかり編) (2008)
- Kururun Rieru Change! (くるるんっ☆りえるチェンジ!) (2009–10)
- Nijiiro Prism Girl (にじいろ☆プリズムガール) (2010–12)
- Koi Shite! Runa Kiss (恋して! るな KISS) (2013–present)
