= Mai Hagiwara =

Japanese apparel designer and former singer (born 1996)

- 萩原 舞
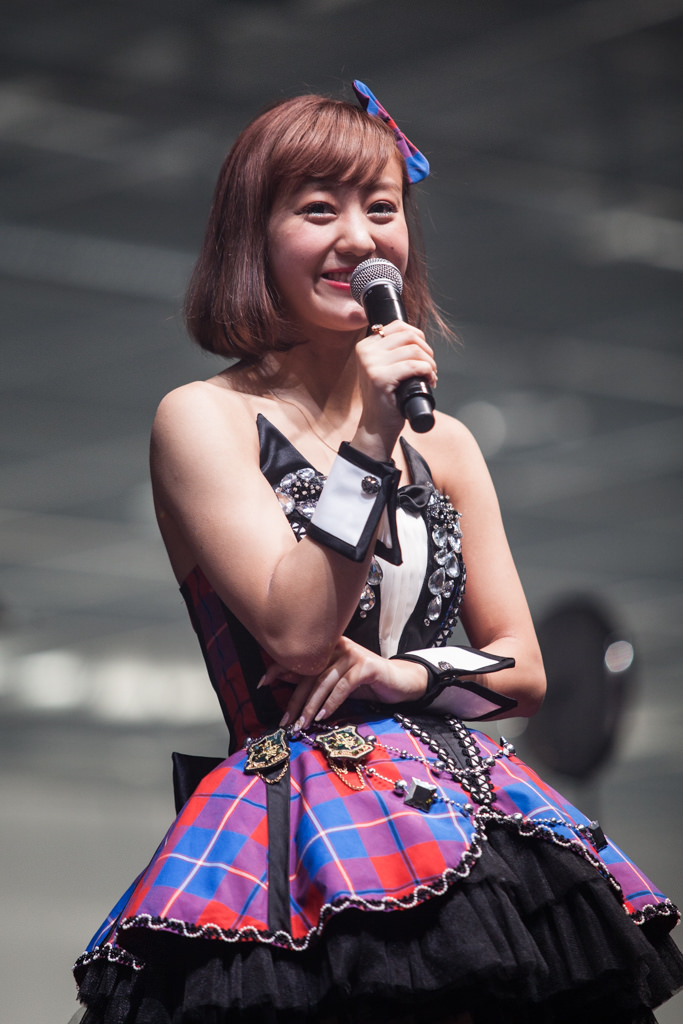
- Hagiwara at Japan Expo 2014
- Born: February 7, 1996 (age 30); Saitama Prefecture, Japan
- Occupations: Singer; actress
- Years active: 2002–2017
- Agent: Up-Front Promotion (2002–2017)
- Children: 1
- Relatives: Michiya Tanaka (grandfather); Eiji Tanaka (grand-uncle); Takashi Saijō (grand-uncle)
- Musical career
- Genres: J-pop
- Label: Zetima
- Formerly of: Cute; Hello! Project Kids; H.P. All Stars; Kira Pika; Petit Moni V; Hello! Project

Mai Hagiwara (萩原 舞, Hagiwara Mai; born February 7, 1996 in Saitama Prefecture) is a Japanese former singer and actress. At age 6, she auditioned for Hello! Project Kids in 2002 and later became part of Cute, a Japanese idol girl group associated with Hello! Project.

== Career ==
=== 2002–2005: Hello! Project Kids, 4Kids ===
In 2002, Hagiwara auditioned for Hello! Project Kids with the song "Te wo Nigitte Arukitai" by Maki Goto. Her audition tape was aired on Morning Musume's variety show Hello! Morning. She was placed in the group with 14 other girls. She made her first appearance as an angel in the 2002 film Mini Moni ja Movie: Okashi na Daibōken!; she also was one of the featured artists in the movie's ending song as a member of 4Kids. Later, in 2004, she participated in singing "All for One & One for All!", a collaboration single released by all Hello! Project artists under the name "H.P. All Stars."

=== 2005–2015: Cute, Kira Pika, and mainstream success ===
In 2004, Berryz Kobo was created with the intention of rotating all of the members of Hello! Project Kids to make time for school, but the idea was later scrapped, and the remaining girls who were not chosen were rebranded under the name Cute on June 11, 2005.

In addition to Cute's activities, Hagiwara briefly ventured into voice acting and played Hikaru Mizuki in the anime Kirarin Revolution from June to September 2007. As part of the show, she became part of the in-show subgroup Kira Pika with Morning Musume's Koharu Kusumi and released their only single, "Hana o Pūn / Futari wa NS" on August 1, 2007. Hagiwara also released her character's version of the song "Koi no Mahō wa Habibi no Bi" for the soundtrack. She made televised and concert appearances portraying Hikaru in real life and appeared as a special guest during Kirarin Revolution's final concert at Nakano Sun Plaza on May 4, 2009.

In 2009, Hagiwara, Saki Nakajima, and Erina Mano released the song "Kimi ga Iru Dake de" as Petit Moni V. In 2012, Hagiwara released her first solo DVD single "Ike! Genki-kun." In 2013, Hagiwara became part of the subgroup Hi-Fin for the Satoumi Movement. Hi-Fin released the song "Kaigan Seisō Danshi" on August 7, 2013 in a compilation album with other artists in the Satoumi Movement.

=== 2016–2017: Disbandment of Cute ===
In August 2016, Cute announced plans to disband in June 2017, citing interest in different career paths as their reason. Hagiwara decided to retire from entertainment following the disbandment to study English abroad in New Zealand. In 2018, Hagiwara produced the apparel brand With Mii.

== Personal life ==
Hagiwara's grandfather is Michiya Tanaka, the owner of the animation studio Tama Production. Her grandfather's older brother is manga artist and animator Eiji Tanaka, the founder of Tama Production, and her grandfather's younger brother is animator Takashi Saijō.

On August 2, 2021, Hagiwara announced on her social media that she is married to a non-celebrity man. On October 16, 2024, Hagiwara shared on her Instagram that she is expecting her first child, which is due around March next year. On March 16, 2025, she announced that she had given birth to a baby boy on the evening of March 11.

== Discography ==
=== Video singles ===
Title	Year	Peak chart positions	Sales	Album
Title	Year	JPN	Sales	Album
"Ike! Genki-kun" (行け！元気君)	2012	—	—	Non-album single

=== Soundtrack ===
List of non-single guest appearances, with other performing artists, showing year released and album name
Title	Year	Other artist(s)	Album
"Koi no Mahō wa Habibi no Bi! (Hikaru version)"	2007	None	Kirarin Revolution Song Selection 2

== Filmography ==
=== Film ===
Year	Title	Role	Notes
2002	Mini Moni ja Movie: Okashi na Daibōken!	Maimai the Angel	Performed ending song as 4Kids
2011	Ōsama Game	Miharu Kanazawa	Supporting role

=== Television ===
Year	Title	Role	Network	Notes
2002–2007	Hello! Morning	Herself	TV Tokyo	Morning Musume's variety show
2002–2004	Hello Kids	Herself	TV Tokyo	Minimoni's variety show
2005	Musume Document 2005	Herself	TV Tokyo	Morning Musume's variety show
2005–2006	Musume Dokyu!	Herself	TV Tokyo	Morning Musume's variety show
2006	Sento no Musume?!	Hinako	MBS TV	Supporting role
2007–2008	Haromoni	Herself	TV Tokyo	Morning Musume's variety show
2007	Kirarin Revolution	Hikaru Mizuki	TV Tokyo	Voice; episodes 62–77
2008	Berikyū!	Herself	TV Tokyo	Berryz Kobo and Cute's variety show
2008	Yorosen!	Herself	TV Tokyo	Hello! Project's variety show
2009	Bijo Houdan	Herself	TV Tokyo	Hello! Project's variety show
2010	Bijo Gaku	Herself	TV Tokyo	Hello! Project's variety show
2011–2012	Hello Pro! Time	Herself	TV Tokyo	Hello! Project's variety show
2012	Sūgaku Joshi Gakuen	Yuko Yotsuya	NTV	Episode 8
2012–2013	Hello! Satoyama Life	Herself	TV Tokyo	Hello! Project's variety show
2014–2017	The Girls Live	Herself	TV Tokyo	Up-Front Works's variety show

=== Theater ===
Year	Title	Role	Notes
2004	Here's Love	Hendrika	Double-cast with Chisato Okai
2007	Neruko wa Cute	Herself	Lead role
2008	Keitai Shōsetsuka	Herself	Lead role
2009	Ataru mo Hakke!?	Herself	Lead role
2010	Akuma no Tsubuyaki	Herself	Lead role
2011	Sengoku Jietai	Herself	Lead role in Defense
2012	Stronger	Herself	Lead role
2012	Cat's Eye	Herself	Lead role
2013	Sakura no Hanataba	Rika Kaneko	Lead role

=== Solo DVDs ===
Title	Year	Details	Peak chart positions	Sales
Title	Year	Details	JPN	Sales
Mai Hagiwara in Hachijō-jima (萩原舞 in 八丈島)	2009	Released: October 21, 2009; Label: Zetima; Format: DVD	64	—
Mizuiro (水色)	2011	Released: June 14, 2011; Label: Zetima; Format: DVD	—	—
