= Happy (Koharu Kusumi song) =

- Regular edition cover

Single by Kirari Tsukishima starring Koharu Kusumi (Morning Musume)

from the album Kirarin Land
- A-side: "Happy"
- B-side: "Koi no Mahō wa Habibi no Bi"
- Released: May 2, 2007 (CD single); May 9, 2007 (DVD single)
- Recorded: 2007
- Genre: J-pop
- Label: Zetima
- Songwriter: Bounceback
- Lyricist: Bounceback

Kirari Tsukishima starring Koharu Kusumi (Morning Musume) singles chronology
"Balalaika" (2006)	"Happy" (2007)	"Chance!" (2007)

Kirarin Revolution singles chronology
"Balalaika" (2006)	"Happy" (2007)	"Hana o Pūn / Futari wa NS" (2007)

Music video
- "Happy" on YouTube

"Happy" (ハッピー☆彡, Happī) is the third opening theme song from the Japanese anime Kirarin Revolution. The song was released on May 2, 2007, and is performed by Koharu Kusumi from Morning Musume, credited as "Kirari Tsukishima starring Koharu Kusumi (Morning Musume)" (月島きらり starring 久住小春(モーニング娘。)). The song was released as Kirari Tsukishima's third single, who Kusumi portrays in the show.

== Background and release ==
"Happy" is the third opening theme song to Kirarin Revolution and is performed by Koharu Kusumi from Morning Musume, who voices the main character, Kirari Tsukishima. The song was released as the character's third single and Kusumi is credited as "Kirari Tsukishima starring Koharu Kusumi (Morning Musume)" (月島きらり starring 久住小春(モーニング娘。)). Regarding the song, Kusumi said, "Listening to 'Happy' gave off a 'Koharu happy' kind of feeling."

To promote the song, Oha Suta aired live-action episodic segments titled "The Secret Behind the New Song 'Happy'" from April 23, 2007, to May 2, 2007. The episode is a fictional account of how Kirari recorded the song with a "psychedelic" music director named Jake Shimamura, with Kusumi reprising her role from the show.

The single was released on May 2, 2007, under the Zetima label. "Koi no Mahō wa Habibi no Bi", the fifth ending theme song to Kirarin Revolution, was included as a B-side and is also performed by Kusumi under her character's name. The song is fast-paced and full of nonsensical words. Kusumi was confused by the lyrics, as she had stated, "My eyes went blank... I was thinking, 'What does 'habibi no bi' mean?"

The limited edition featured an alternate cover and an exclusive version of Takara Tomy's paper doll Millefeui Card from Kirarin Revolution, while the first press bonus for the regular edition came with a large sticker.

A video single, referred as a "Single V", was released on May 9, 2007.

== Music video ==
The music video was directed by Hideo Kawatani and produced by Tetsushi Suehiro. It features Kusumi dressed up as her character, Kirari Tsukishima, and dancing in a set resembling an outdoor yard with clouds. Regarding the video, Kusumi commented that her favorite part was jumping on the trampoline. A version featuring the choreography was released with the video single.

== Reception ==
The CD single debuted at #2 in the Oricon Weekly Singles Chart and charted for 15 weeks. The single sold 57,278 copies in total. The video single charted at #15 on the Oricon Weekly DVD Charts.

Editors at Barks found "Happy" to have the "sparkling" charm from the character Kirari Tsukishima. They described the music video as "matching the image of the same song." For the single's coupling track, "Koi no Mahō wa Habibi no Bi", they felt its nonsensical lyrics and Kusumi's exaggerated singing brought out the energy and tension in the song, comparing the song's catchiness to "Girlfriend" by Canadian singer Avril Lavigne. They also mentioned "Koi no Mahō wa Habibi no Bi" was more difficult than it appeared to sing because of its fast pace.

== Track listing ==
=== Single ===
No.	Title	Lyrics	Music	Arrangement	Length
1.	"Happy" (ハッピー☆彡)	Bounceback	Bounceback	Bounceback
2.	"Koi no Mahō wa Habibi no Bi" (恋の魔法はハビビのビ！ lit. The Magic of Love Ends with Darling)	Chieko Suyama; Katsuya Yoshida	Katsuya Yoshida	Katsuya Yoshida
3.	"Happy" (Instrumental)		Bounceback	Bounceback

=== DVD single ===
No.	Title	Length
1.	"Happy"
2.	"Happy" (Dance Shot Ver.)
3.	"Making Of" (メイキング映像)

== Charts ==
=== Single ===
Chart	Peak position
Oricon Weekly Singles Chart	2

=== DVD single ===
Chart	Peak position
Oricon Weekly DVD Chart	15
