= Takuya Ide =

- 井出 卓也
- Born: March 12, 1991 (age 35); Tokyo, Japan
- Other name: Idetaku
- Education: Aoyama Gakuin University
- Occupations: Actor, singer
- Years active: 1993–
- Agent: Space Craft Entertainment
- Known for: Hotaru no Hikari; Yamada-kun and the Seven Witches; Kirarin Revolution; Tensai TV-kun Series
- Height: 1.74 m (5 ft 9 in)
- Musical career
- Genres: J-pop; rock
- Instruments: Vocals; keyboard
- Website: Official profile

Takuya Ide (井出 卓也, Ide Takuya; born March 12, 1991, in Tokyo, Japan) is a Japanese actor and singer represented by Space Craft Entertainment. Ide was the keyboardist and rapper of Cocoa Otoko. He was also a former member of the boy band Ryoga. He was a "TV Senshi" in the NHK Educational TV series Tensai TV-kun Series from 2001 to 2004.

== Biography ==
On 1993 Ide debuted as a model in Harajuku.

From April 2001 to March 2005 he appeared in Tensai TV-kun Series as a "TV Senshi".

On 2010 Ide became a member of Cocoa Otoko. The group later disbanded in March 2012. He later became a solo singer in 2013. Ide graduated from Aoyama Gakuin University in March 2015. In April 2016 he later became a member of the dance vocal group Ryoga. He left Ryoga on December 31st, 2017.

== Filmography ==
=== Drama ===
| Year | Title | Role | Network | Notes |
|---|---|---|---|---|
| 1999 | Kai | Yoshikazu's son | NHK BS-2 | |
| 2007 | Kosodate no Tensai | Fumiya-kun | Fuji TV | |
| 2010 | Hotaru no Hikari | Shota Umeda | NTV | |
| | Kogane no Buta: Kaikei Kensa-chō Tokubetsu Chōsa-ka | International student | NTV | Episode 7 |
| 2011 | Himitsu Chouhouin Erika | Jyunpei Sonoda | NTV | |
| 2013 | Ataru Special: New York Kara no Chōsen-jō!! | Nanbo | TBS | |
| 2013 | Yamada-kun and the Seven Witches | Toranosuke Miyamura | Fuji TV | |
| 2014 | Kin'yō Prestige: Joi Shōko Kuraishi –Shi no Saishū Shindan– | Kento Aoyama | Fuji TV | |
| 2014 | Henshin | Norio Yabe | WOWOW | |
| 2014 | Osoroshi: Mishima Yahen Chō Hyaku Monogatari | Ichitaro | NHK BS Premium | Episode 4 and Final Episode |
| 2014 | Tokkō Jimuin Minowa | Yoshiyuki Sato | YTV | Episode 11 |
| 2015 | Heat | Akihiro Sakaki | KTV | |

=== Anime ===
| Year | Title | Role | Network | Notes |
|---|---|---|---|---|
| 2008 | Kirarin Revolution | Hiroto Kazama | TV Tokyo | Episodes 103-end |

=== Films ===
| Year | Title | Role | Notes |
|---|---|---|---|
| 2007 | Haru no Yūutsu | Protagonist's love | |
| 2010 | Neck | | |
| 2012 | Hotaru no Hikari | Shota Umeda | |
| 2012 | Ushijima the Loan Shark | Naoya | |
| 2013 | Toshokan Sensō | Nagai | |
| 2016 | Itazura na Kiss | Watanabe | |

=== Stage ===
| Year | Title | Role | Notes |
|---|---|---|---|
| 2011 | WBB vol. 1: Samurai Night Fever | | |
| 2012 | *pnish* Produce: Monster Box | | |
| 2012 | Musical The 1st Shop of Coffee Prince | Chin Harim | |
| 2012 | Sanada Ten Braves: Kakko Yokunakya Shinu Dake sa | Sasuke Sarutobi | |
| 2013 | Bukkowashitai Sekai | | |
| 2013 | Ongaku Geki: Smile of Chaplin | Takeru Inukai | |
| 2013 | Black Butler | Ronald Knox | |
| 2013 | WBB vol. 5: Samurai Night Fever Sainen | | |
| 2014 | Kreva no Atarashī Ongaku Geki: Saikō wa Hitotsu Janai 2014 | Masahiko | |
| 2014 | potluck4 supported by Astro Hall | | |
| 2017 | Fate/Grand Order The Stage: The Holy Domain of the Round Table: Camelot | Romani Archaman | |
| 2019 | Fate/Grand Order The Stage: Order VII: The Absolute Frontline in the War Against the Demonic Beasts: Babylonia | Romani Archaman | |
| 2020 | Fate/Grand Order The Stage: The Grand Temple of Time: Solomon Ars Nova | Romani Archaman | |

=== One-man shows ===
| Year | Title | Notes |
|---|---|---|
| 2013 | Sokubaku! Takuya Ide 1st live | |
| 2013 | Yūwaku: Takuya Ide 2nd live | |
| 2014 | Good Times: Takuya Ide 3rd live | |
| 2016 | Takuya Ide 4th Live: Radio Jack | |

=== Variety ===
| Year | Title | Network | Notes |
|---|---|---|---|
| 1999 | Matahari | Space Shower TV | Child caster |
| 2001 | Konishiki no School Bus | CS Kids Station, Sky PerfecTV! | |
| 2001 | Tensai Terebi-kun Wide | NHK E TV | TV Senshi |
| 2003 | Tensai Terebi-kun Max | NHK E TV | TV Senshi |
| 2010 | Dancing Sanma Palace | NTV | |
| 2011 | Quiz! Hexagon II | Fuji TV | |
| 2011 | Otokowoageru! Yoru no o Nayami Sōdan-kai | NTV | |
| 2013 | Vs Arashi | Fuji TV | |
| 2016 | Last Kiss: Saigo ni Kiss Suru Date | TBS | |

=== Other TV series ===
| Year | Title | Network | Notes |
|---|---|---|---|
| 2003 | BS Domo-kun World | NHK | |
| 2004 | Nin Tama Ojaruda! Hi no Tori! Anime Quiz Nihonichi | NHK G TV, BS hi | |
| 2008 | Oha Suta | TV Tokyo | As Hiroto Kazama; MC on Thursdays |

== Bibliography ==
=== Magazines ===
| Title | Notes |
|---|---|
| Love Berry | |
| Zexy | |

=== Books ===
| Year | Title | Notes |
|---|---|---|
| 2005 | Shōnen Haiyū vol. 1 | |
| 2006 | Fresh Star Meikan 2006 | |
