= You Kikkawa =

Japanese singer and actress (born 1992)

You Kikkawa 吉川 友
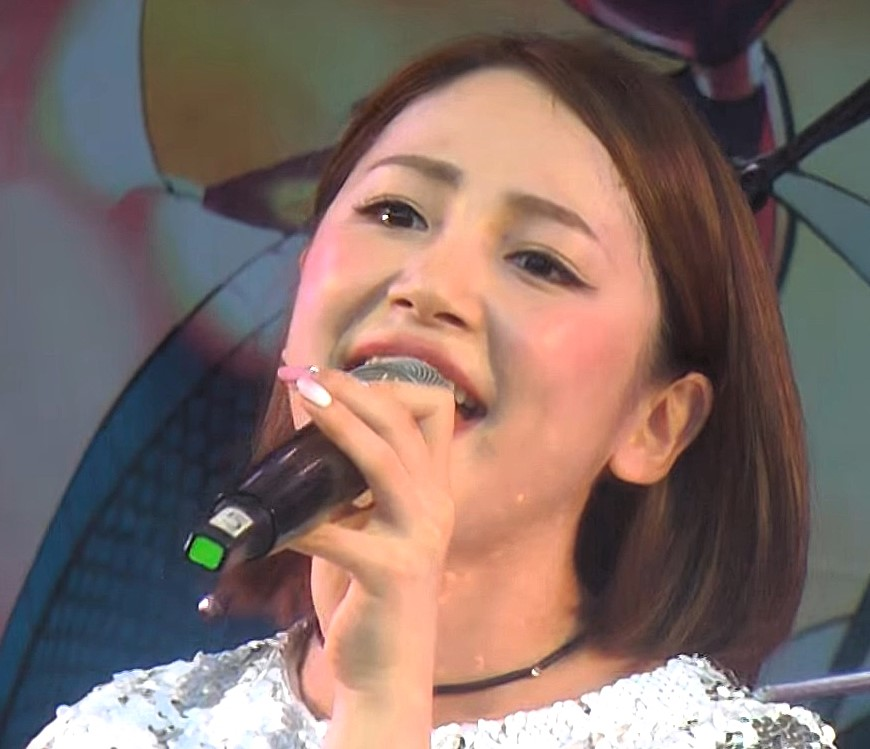
- Kikkawa at the 2016 Kaohsiung Pier 2 Animation Festival

Background information
- Also known as: Kikka, Kobeni Hanasaki starring You Kikkawa
- Born: May 1, 1992 (age 34); Ibaraki Prefecture, Japan
- Genres: J-pop
- Occupations: Singer; actress
- Years active: 2007–present
- Labels: Zetima, Universal J
- Formerly of: Team Makenki; MilkyWay; Hello Pro Egg; Hello! Project
- Website: www.kikkawayou.com

You Kikkawa (吉川 友, Kikkawa Yū; born May 1, 1992 in Ibaraki Prefecture) is a Japanese singer and actress. Kikkawa achieved early fame portraying Kobeni Hanasaki from Kirarin Revolution Stage 3 and later debuted as a solo singer with the song, "Kikkake wa You!"

== Career ==
=== 2006–2010: Pre-debut, Kirarin Revolution ===
Kikkawa auditioned for Morning Musume's 8th generation in 2006 and was one of six finalists out of 6,883 applicants. Despite not making the group, she was accepted into Hello! Project's trainee group, Hello Pro Egg, in 2007. Prior to joining, she had done minor theatre work.

In 2008, Kikkawa provided the voice to Kobeni Hanasaki in Kirarin Revolution Stage 3. She became part of the in-show subgroup MilkyWay with Koharu Kusumi from Morning Musume and Sayaka Kitahara from Hello Pro Egg. Kikkawa also released songs for the soundtrack under the name "Kobeni Hanasaki starring You Kikkawa." She also made televised and concert appearances portraying Kobeni in real life.

=== 2011–present: Solo debut ===
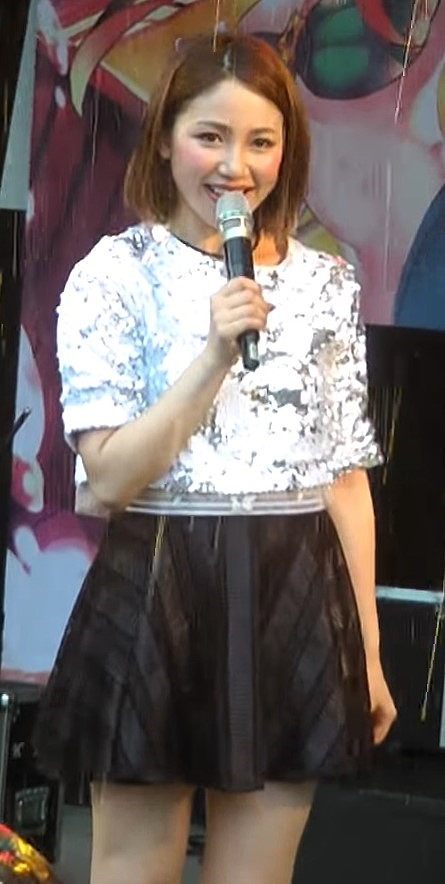
Kikkawa at the 2016 Kaohsiung Pier 2 Animation Festival

In 2011, Kikkawa debuted as a solo singer with the song "Kikkake wa You!"

She appeared in the 2011 film Cheerfu11y.

In 2013, she played the role of Chava in the Japanese production of Fiddler on the Roof.

On May 6, 2015, Kikkawa releases her 9th single, "Hana", which is the longest single among idol artists in Japan, with about 17 1/2 minutes in length, with strong influences of Takarazuka.

== Discography ==
=== Albums ===
==== Studio albums ====
Title	Details	Peak chart positions	Sales
Title	Details	JPN	Sales
One for You!	Released: January 18, 2012; Label: Universal J; Formats: CD	9	
Two You	Released: April 24, 2013; Label: Universal J; Formats: CD	59	
You the 3rd: Wildflower	Released: October 14, 2015; Label: Universal J; Formats: CD	55	

==== Compilation albums ====
Title	Details	Peak chart positions	Sales
Title	Details	JPN	Sales
Best of You!	Released: August 7, 2013; Label: Universal J; Formats: CD	63	

==== Cover albums ====
Title	Details	Peak chart positions	Sales
Title	Details	JPN	Sales
Vocalist?	Released: November 7, 2012; Label: Universal J; Formats: CD	40	

=== Singles ===
==== Regular singles ====
List of singles, with selected chart positions
Title	Date	Peak chart positions	Sales (JPN)	RIAJ certification	Album
Title	Date	JPN	Sales (JPN)	RIAJ certification	Album
"Kikkake wa You!"	May 11, 2011	9			One for You!
"Hapirapi (Sunrise)"	October 5, 2011	4			One for You!
"Konna Watashi de Yokattara"	December 28, 2011	16			One for You!
"Koko kara Hajimarun da!"	July 11, 2012	25			Two You
"Darling to Madonna"	September 26, 2012	18			Two You
"Sekaijū ni Kimi wa Hitori dake"	January 16, 2013	19			Two You
"Urahara Temptation"	June 25, 2014	17			You the 3rd: Wildflower
"Amai Melody"	October 29, 2014	16			You the 3rd: Wildflower
"Hana"	May 6, 2015	15			You the 3rd: Wildflower
"Ha wo Kuishibare!" "Charming Shōbu Sedai"	June 25, 2014	23			Non-album singles
"Sayonara, Standard"	May 24, 2017	31			Non-album singles
"Distortion" "Tokimeita no ni Through"	January 17, 2018	21			Non-album singles
"—" denotes releases that did not chart.

==== Digital singles ====
List of singles, with selected chart positions
Title	Date	Peak chart positions	Sales (JPN)	RIAJ certification
Title	Date	JPN	Sales (JPN)	RIAJ certification
"Neo Sugar Sugar You"	May 23, 2018	—		
"Saikō no Onna"	September 12, 2018	—		
"Kawaisōna Onna"	March 2, 2019	—		
"Koi"	May 1, 2019	—		
"Yoake"	July 31, 2019	—		
"Tokai no Onna"	March 10, 2020	—		
"#Himatsubushi "	June 3, 2020	—		
"Taboo"	December 10, 2020	—		
"—" denotes releases that did not chart.

== Filmography ==
- Dad, Chibi is Gone (2019)

=== Film ===
Year	Title	Role	Notes
2010	Kaidan Shin Mimi Bukuro Kaiki	Yuko Hitotsugi	Lead role in "Tsukimono"
2011	Cheerfu11y	Kanna Ishikawa	Lead role
2011	Kikkake wa You!	Herself	Lead role

=== Television ===
Year	Title	Role	Notes
2008	Kirarin Revolution Stage 3	Kobeni Hanasaki	Lead role; voice

== Tours ==
- You Kikkawa Band Live Tour 2018: Hasutaku Warai: Neo Sugar Sugar You (吉川 友 バンドライブツアー2018 一蓮託笑 〜NEO SUGAR SUGAR YOU〜)
