= Sayaka Kitahara =

- Born: November 29, 1993 (age 32); Saitama Prefecture, Japan
- Occupations: Singer; actress; voice actress
- Agent: Ken Production
- Musical career
- Genres: J-pop
- Years active: 2004–present
- Labels: Zetima; FRAME

Sayaka Kitahara (北原沙弥香, Kitahara Sayaka) (born on November 29, 1993, in Saitama Prefecture, Japan) is a Japanese voice actress, actress and former singer.

== Biography ==
In 2004, Sayaka Kitahara became a member of Hello Pro Egg, under Hello! Project. In 2008, she became a part of the unit MilkyWay, as a tie-in to the anime Kirarin Revolution, in which all three members of the group have parts, with Kitahara as Noel Yukino; the band sing the last theme songs of the show, and their two singles rank in the top 10 of the oricon music charts. The series ended in 2009, then in 2010 she plays a main part in the horror movie Kaidan Shin Mimibukuro Kaiki.

She graduated from Hello Pro Egg in 2011, and begins a solo career. Since then, she voices the part of Aoi Sorano in the anime Inazuma Eleven GO, and sings the ending themes of the series, as "Sorano Aoi (CV: Kitahara Sayaka)"; her first three solo singles as "Sorano Aoi (...)" also chart on oricon. On September 9, 2012, it was announced that Kitahara Sayaka would join Avex beginning October 2012. On 2013, she became a part of the unit COLORS(カラーズ） as "Sorano Aoi (CV:Kitahara Sayaka) with "Morimura Konoha(CV:Yuki Aoi)", then with "Mizukawa Minori(CV:Takagaki Ayahi)". Now she is also a part of COLORS but as "Kitahara Sayaka" with "Kobayashi Yuu". This is the first time she sings as "Kitahara Sayaka", not "Sorano Aoi(CV:Kitahara Sayaka)" nor "Yukino Noel(CV:Kitahara Sayaka)".

On July 19, 2022, Kitahara tested positive for COVID-19.

== Solo discography ==
Singles

As « Sorano Aoi (CV: Kitahara Sayaka) »

- 2011/06/22 : Yappa Seishun (やっぱ青春)
- 2011/11/09 : Kanari Juujou (かなり純情)
- 2012/02/08 : Hajike-Yo!! (HAJIKE-YO!!)
- 2012/06/13 : "Natsu ga Yattekuru (夏がやってくる)
- 2013/03/06 : Haru NO Gradation (春のグラデーション)

== COLORS ==
- 2013/07/03 : Katte Ni Cinderella (勝手にシンデレラ)
- 2013/11/16 : Fashion Uchuu Senshi (ファッション 宇宙戦士)
- 2014/03/06 : Arashi Tatsumaki Hurricane (嵐 竜巻 ハリケーン)

== Filmography ==
=== Anime ===
List of voice performances in anime
Year	Title	Role	Source
2008–2009	Kirarin Revolution	Yukino Noel	
2011–2012	Inazuma Eleven GO	Sorano Aoi	
2012	Inazuma Eleven GO VS Danball Senki W	Sorano Aoi	
2012–2013	Inazuma Eleven GO: Chrono Stone	Sorano Aoi	
2013–2014	Inazuma Eleven GO: Galaxy	Sorano Aoi	
2014	Space Dandy	Sidekick Emily	
2016	Concrete Revolutio: The Last Song	Momose	
2016	My Hero Academia	All Might's fan	
2016	Aikatsu Stars!	Upperclassman	
2016	Berserk (2016 TV series)	Maid	
2016	Days	Sayuri's friend	
2017	Armed Girl's Machiavellism	Mary Kikakujou	
2018	Butlers: Chitose Momotose Monogatari	P-chan, Yuuhi Nishimiya	
2019	Kakegurui XX	Nozomi Komabami	

Film

- 2010 : Kaidan Shin Mimibukuro Kaiki

Dubbing

- Red Dwarf, Waitress Greta (Amrita Acharia)
- Carmen Sandiego, The Driver (Toks Olagundoye)
- I Know What You Did Last Summer, Stevie Ward (Sarah Pidgeon)
- Snowdrop, Eun Yeong-ro (Jisoo)
- Teach You a Lesson, Im Han-rim (Jin Ki-joo)

=== Video games ===
- Girls' Frontline (2014) SPR A3G, Type 03.
- White Cat Project (2014) Tin
- Girl Friend Beta (2015) Tamaki Hayashi
- The Idolmaster Shiny Colors (2018) Mei Izumi
- galaxyz (2021) Aina
- 2XKO (2026) Announcer (Japanese dub).
