= Koharu Kusumi =

- 久住 小春
- Born: July 15, 1992 (age 34); Niigata Prefecture, Japan
- Occupations: Actress; model; singer
- Years active: 2005–present
- Agents: Up-Front Promotion (2005-2009); JP Room (2009-2012, 2015-2016); Oscar Promotion (2017-present)
- Notable work: Kirarin Revolution as Kirari Tsukishima
- Height: 166 cm (5 ft 5 in)
- Musical career
- Genres: J-pop
- Instrument: Vocals
- Label: Zetima
- Member of: Dream Morning Musume
- Formerly of: Morning Musume; Morning Musume Tanjō 10nen Kinentai; Kira Pika; MilkyWay; ZYX-α; Ex-ceed!

Koharu Kusumi (久住 小春, Kusumi Koharu; born July 15, 1992 in Niigata Prefecture) is a Japanese actress, model, television personality, and singer. In 2005, she became the only seventh generation member of the Japanese idol girl group Morning Musume, a part of Hello! Project.

While Kusumi was in Morning Musume, she provided the voice for Kirari Tsukishima, the main character of the anime series Kirarin Revolution, and portrayed her in real life on Oha Suta. In addition, she was featured in several musical releases affiliated with the series, including both solo releases under the name Kirari Tsukishima starring Koharu Kusumi (Morning Musume) (月島きらりstarring久住小春(モーニング娘。)) and group releases for the units Kira Pika and Milky Way.

After leaving Morning Musume in 2009, Kusumi pursued modeling, discussing her career changes in her 2011 autobiography, 17-sai no Tenshoku. After making her runway debut in 2011, she modeled exclusively for magazines CanCam and Steady, while also making regular appearances on variety shows. At the same time, Kusumi continued to perform at music events and took part in Dream Morning Musume. Kusumi also ventured into acting, appearing in television dramas such as starring in Ripe for the Picking.

== Early life ==
Koharu Kusumi was born in Ojimaya, Washima Village in Niigata Prefecture, and grew up in a rural neighborhood. Her family consisted of her parents, an older sister, and an older brother. Around the middle of elementary school, Kusumi became interested in modeling from reading magazines like CanCam. Prior to joining Morning Musume, Kusumi was the captain of her school's volleyball team.

== Career ==
=== 2005-2009: Morning Musume, Kirarin Revolution ===
In 2005, after seeing an audition call for new members for the Japanese idol group Morning Musume in a magazine, Kusumi considered applying after noticing she was eligible based on the minimum age requirements to participate. With her sister's help, Kusumi auditioned in secret with the song "As a Person" by Tomomi Kahara. She sang "Furusato" during the final audition and was selected for the group as the only seventh generation member, a feat which earned her the nickname "Miracle" from producer Tsunku. Kusumi debuted on the single "Iroppoi Jirettai" and was one of the founding members of Hello! Project's kickball team, Metro Rabbits H.P., in 2006.

In April 2006, Kusumi was cast in the anime adaptation of the manga series Kirarin Revolution as Kirari Tsukishima, the main character. Throughout the series' run, she released the singles "Koi Kana", "Balalaika", "Happy", "Chance!", "Papancake", and "Happy Happy Sunday!" under the character's name. Kusumi also made crossover television and concert appearances as Kirari on Haromoni@ and Oha Suta, leading her to become closely associated with the character. The success of Kirarin Revolution and Kusumi's real-world appearances as Kirari made her one of the earliest examples of the "idol voice actor" crossover that became popular beginning in the late 2000s. Throughout the show's run, Kusumi also released music as groups Kira Pika and MilkyWay with other cast members. Kusumi was named #17 in Daitan Map's "Top 50 Voice Actors of Popular Characters" in 2007.

In early 2007, Kusumi became part of Morning Musume Tanjō 10nen Kinentai, a subgroup created to celebrate Morning Musume's 10th anniversary, with their first single, "Bokura ga Ikiru My Asia", releasing on January 24, 2007. In 2009, she released a song with the subgroup ZYX-α.

A manga adaptation by Rio Fujimi recounting Kusumi's rise to stardom was serialized in Ciao, titled Miracle Revolution: Koharu Kusumi's Story. Preferring the freedom she had working on her solo projects, Kusumi decided to pursue a solo career after Kirarin Revolution ended, mainly in modeling as well as other paths in entertainment, including comedy. On September 19, 2009, Tsunku announced that Kusumi would leave Morning Musume and Hello! Project on December 6, at the final performance of Morning Musume's 2009 fall tour, Nine Smile. Roughly 4,000 fans attended the graduation concert.

=== 2010-2015: Solo television hosting and model runway debut ===
After graduating from Morning Musume, Kusumi continued to appear on Oha Suta, as well as Oha Coro. In January 2010, she joined other former Morning Musume members in the group Dream Morning Musume, which later debuted in April 2011. In July 2010, she performed with Li Chun, Qian Lin, and Miyabi Natsuyaki at the Shanghai World Expo 2010 under the group name Ex-ceed. From December 22–27, 2010, Kusumi appeared in the stage play Abe Naikaku alongside Natsumi Abe and Kei Yasuda.

Kusumi released an autobiography titled 17-sai no Tenshoku on February 12, 2011, which documented her childhood, Morning Musume, and interest in healthy lifestyles, all of which discussed her interest in pursuing a new career. She also appeared in a series of advertisements directed towards a healthy lifestyle.

In September 2011, Kusumi made her runway debut at the Kobe Collection 2011 Autumn/Winter Show. Beginning in the same month, she modeled exclusively for the fashion magazine CanCam, starting from the November 2011 issue until the September 2015 issue. In 2012, Kusumi made runway appearances at the CanCam × AneCan Collaboration Fashion Show: Can Colle!, Stock Style 2012 Spring/Summer, and Girls Award 2012 Autumn/Winter shows. In 2013, she made runway appearances at the Girls Award 2013 Spring/Summer, Tokyo Girls Collection 2013 Spring Live, ReaMa Pastel Party 2013 in Tokyo Show, and Girls Award 2013 Autumn/Winter shows.

In 2014, Kusumi left Oha Suta and later hosted Blurred Sound Pops until 2015. She also starred in two live-action dramas, Inauguration! Girl's Cabinet, and Again!!.

In May 2015, Kusumi became a host of "Boat Race Live." on BS Fuji.

In November 2015. Kusumi started working as a model for the fashion magazine "steady."

=== 2016-present: Venture into acting ===
On January 9, 2016, Kusumi started hosting a weekly radio show called "This Happy Time (or KoHappy Time)." On April 1, 2016, Kusumi started hosting a second radio program called "Kusumi Koharu's Mediaship 927" on BSN also in Niigata, Japan.

On November 29, 2016, Kusumi announced that her contract with her talent agency, JP Room, would end on November 30. In early 2017 it was announced that Kusumi would be represented by Oscar Promotion, and would have a role as geisha in a drama called "Woman Prisoner 7."

In October 2017, Kusumi appeared in the fifth season of the popular medical drama, Doctor-X as Nurse Haruna Nagamori.

On November 23, 2018, Kusumi appeared in a supporting role in the feature film, "Lady in White."

In 2019, Kusumi released a wall calendar and appeared in the film "Shell and Joint."

In 2024, she plays the main role in the drama Uri wo waru, adapted from the manga Ripe for the Picking.

== Discography ==
=== As Kirari Tsukishima ===
Studio albums

- Mitsuboshi (2006)
- Kirarin Land (2007)
- Kirari to Fuyu (2008)

Compilation albums

- Best Kirari (2009)

Singles

- "Koi Kana" (2006)
- "Balalaika" (2006)
- "Happy" (2007)
- "Chance!" (2007)
- "Papancake" (2008)
- "Happy Happy Sunday!" (2009)

== Publications ==
=== Photobooks ===
| Year | Title | Publisher | ISBN |
|---|---|---|---|
| 2006 | Koharu Kusumi (久住小春) | Wani Books | ISBN 978-4-8470-2923-3 |
| 2007 | Pop | Kadokawa | ISBN 978-4-04-894499-1 |
| 2008 | Koharu Nikki (久住小春写真集「小春日記。」) | Wani Books | ISBN 978-4-8470-4102-0 |
| 2008 | Happy Memorial Photobook (月島きらり starring 久住小春(モーニング娘。)『ハッピーメモリアル☆フォトブック) (Kirarin Revolution; credited as Kirari Tsukishima starring Koharu Kusumi (Morning Musume)) | Shogakukan | ISBN 978-4-09-132290-6 |
| 2009 | Sugar Doll | Wani Books | ISBN 978-4-8470-4202-7 |
| 2017 | Moment | Futabasha | ISBN 978-4-5753-1321-5 |

=== Autobiographies ===
| Year | Title | Publisher | ISBN |
|---|---|---|---|
| 2011 | 17-sai no Tenshoku (17歳の転職) | Up-Front Books | ISBN 978-4-8470-1965-4 |

== Filmography ==
=== Television ===
| Year | Title | Role | Network | Notes |
|---|---|---|---|---|
| 2005 | Hello! Morning | Herself | TV Tokyo | Morning Musume's variety show |
| 2005 | Musume Dokyu! (娘DOKYU!) | Herself | TV Tokyo | Morning Musume's variety show |
| 2006 | Kirarin Revolution | Kirari Tsukishima | TV Tokyo | Voice; lead role |
| 2006 | Oha Suta | Kirari Tsukishima (2006-2009); Herself (2009-2014) | TV Tokyo | Variety show regular guest on Tuesdays |
| 2007 | Haromoni | Herself; Kirari Tsukishima | TV Tokyo | Morning Musume's variety show |
| 2009 | Piramekino | Herself | TV Tokyo | Variety show regular panelist |
| 2010 | Oha Coro | Herself | Variety show regular panelist | |
| 2014 | Inauguration! Girl's Cabinet (発足！ギャル内閣) | Yamato Singh | TV Chiba | |
| 2014 | Otoboke Pops | Herself | BS-TBS | Variety show regular panelist |
| 2014 | Last Kiss: Saigo ni Kiss Suru Date (ラストキス〜最後にキスするデート) | Herself | TBS | Reality show; pilot episode; paired with Robin |
| 2014 | Again!! (アゲイン!!) | Abe TamaTakashi | MBS | |
| 2015 | Boat Race Live | Herself | BS Fuji | Host |
| 2016 | Toto Television (トットてれび) | Bubble | NHK | Cameo |
| 2017 | Seven Women in Prison (女囚セブン) | Koharu | TV Asahi | |
| 2017 | Doctor-X: Surgeon Michiko Daimon | Haruna Nagamori | TV Asahi | |
| 2024 | Ripe for the Picking | Maiko Kousaka | TBS | |

=== Radio ===
| Program | Start date | End date | Station |
|---|---|---|---|
| TBC Fun Fīrudo Mōretsu Mōdasshu (TBC Funふぃーるど・モーレツモーダッシュ) | November 7, 2005 | November 18, 2005 | TBC |
| This Happy Time (or KoHappy Time) (こはっぴーTIME) | January 9, 2016 | June 30, 2020 | 79.0 FM Port, Niigata |
| Kusumi Koharu's Mediaship 927 | April 1, 2016 | March 31, 2017 | BSN: Broadcasting System of Niigata, Inc. |

=== Film ===
| Year | Title | Role | Notes |
|---|---|---|---|
| 2018 | Lady in White | Kumi Aikawa | |
| 2019 | Shell and Joint | Customer in Restaurant. | |
