= Kirarin Revolution =

Anime and manga series

- Cover of the first volume of Kirarin Revolution featuring Na-san (left) and Kirari (right)

きらりん☆レボリューション (Kirarin Reboryūshion)
- Genre: Romantic comedy
- Manga
- Written by: An Nakahara
- Published by: Shogakukan
- Imprint: Ciao Comics
- Magazine: Ciao; Pucchigumi
- Original run: March 2004 – June 2009
- Volumes: 14
- Anime television series
- Directed by: Masaharu Okuwaki
- Produced by: Susumu Matsuyama; Shinsaku Hatta (1–31); Kensuke Sarai (32–68); Takahiro Suzuki (69–102)
- Written by: Michihiro Tsuchiya
- Music by: bice
- Studio: Synergy SP; G&G Entertainment
- Original network: TV Tokyo, AT-X
- Original run: April 7, 2006 – March 28, 2008
- Episodes: 102
- Anime television series

Kirarin Revolution Stage 3
- Directed by: Yoshitaka Fujimoto
- Produced by: Susumu Matsuyama; Takahiro Suzuki; Mayumi Sato
- Written by: Hiroko Fukuda
- Music by: Yoichi Sakai
- Studio: Synergy SP; SimImage
- Original network: TV Tokyo, AT-X
- Original run: April 8, 2008 – March 27, 2009
- Episodes: 51
- Games
- List of Kirarin Revolution games

Kirarin Revolution (Japanese: きらりん☆レボリューション, Hepburn: Kirarin Reboryūshon) is a Japanese manga series by An Nakahara. The series ran in the shōjo manga magazine Ciao from March 2004 to June 2009, with side stories running in Pucchigumi in 2006. The manga has sold a cumulative total of over 10 million copies. It was awarded Best Children's Manga at the 2006 Shogakukan Manga Awards.

An anime adaptation premiered on April 7, 2006, in Japan on TV Tokyo and ran for 102 episodes until March 28, 2008. A second season with the subtitle Kirarin Revolution Stage 3 (きらりん☆レボリューションSTAGE3, Kirarin Reboryūshon Stage 3) aired from April 8, 2008, to March 27, 2009, in high-definition and 3D animation. The anime series stars Morning Musume member Koharu Kusumi, and during the show's run, she released music and made crossover appearances at concerts and television shows as the character. Starting with Kirarin Revolution Stage 3, additional cast members joined her in music activities, such as MilkyWay and Ships.

== Plot ==
Kirari Tsukishima, a 14-year-old beauty, does not care about idols and the entertainment world because her mind is occupied by food. One day, after saving a turtle stranded in a tree, Kirari meets a boy named Seiji, who gives her a ticket to a concert to show his gratitude for her saving his pet. However, when Kirari shows up at the concert, another boy named Hiroto, tears up her ticket and warns her to stay away from Seiji, because they both live in different worlds. Kirari learns that Seiji and Hiroto are members of the idol group Ships. Finally understanding the meaning of "different worlds", Kirari refuses to give up pursuing Seiji and declares that she will also become an idol. However, being an idol requires tons of training and talent. Faced with rivals and scandals, Kirari is determined to come out as a top idol.

== Characters ==
=== Main characters ===
Kirari Tsukishima (月島 きらり, Tsukishima Kirari)
Voiced by: Miyu Matsuki (drama CD), Koharu Kusumi (anime)
Kirari is a beautiful 14-year-old girl who strives to be an idol to become closer to Seiji. She has a huge appetite for food. Despite her shortcomings and lack of talents, she manages to persevere as a result of the help she receives from her friends and her unwavering resilience. As time passes and she spends time with Hiroto, she begins to fall in love with him instead.
Na-san (なーさん, Nā-san)
Voiced by: Kumiko Higa (drama CD), Chigusa Ikeda (anime)
Na-san is Kirari's cat who acts competent and intelligent. He provides a lot of help to Kirari and protects her from danger.
Hiroto Kazama (風真 宙人, Kazama Hiroto)
Voiced by: Masaki Mimoto (drama CD), Akio Suyama (episodes 1-102), Takuya Ide (episodes 103-153)
Hiroto is a member of boy band Ships. Hiroto acts honest and strict towards Kirari. Despite how he treats her, he falls in love with her. Although he supports Kirari's feelings for Seiji throughout the series, he often worries about her when she faces difficult situations and is usually the one who helps her out.
Seiji Hiwatari (日渡 星司, Hiwatari Seiji)
Voiced by: Wataru Hatano (drama CD), Souichiro Hoshi (episodes 1-102), Shikou Kanai (episodes 103-153)
Seiji is a member of boy band Ships. He is gentle and air-headed, and Kirari compares him to a prince. He has a pet turtle named Kame-san (カメさん).

=== Stage 3 characters ===
Noel Yukino (雪野 のえる, Yukino Noeru)
Voiced by: Sayaka Kitahara
Noel is an original character created for the anime and part of the idol unit MilkyWay. She is an athletic girl who loves playing sports. She is in love with her childhood friend, Cloudy. She owns a pet cat named Ni-kun (にーくん, Nī-kun; Voiced by: Tetsuya Kakihara), who used to be the leader of a gang in his cat town and joins Mi-chan and Na-san in their own idol unit, Triangle.
Kobeni Hanasaki (花咲 こべに, Hanasaki Kobeni)
Voiced by: You Kikkawa
Kobeni is an original character created for the anime and part of the idol unit MilkyWay. Kobeni is usually seen with a crystal ball. She owns a pet cat named Mi-chan (みーちゃん, Mī-chan; Voiced by: Noriko Shitaya), who used to live in luxury and joins Ni-kun and Na-san in their own idol unit, Triangle.

=== Recurring characters ===
Arashi Amamiya (雨宮 嵐, Amamiya Arashi)
Voiced by: Takafumi Kawakami
Arashi is Kirari's childhood friend and an illusionist who moved to Osaka when they were six. He tries to get Kirari to quit the entertainment world so that she will fulfill their childhood promise of being his wife. He owns a pet cat named Na-yan (なーやん, Nā-yan; Voiced by: Miwa Kouzuki), who is Na-san's brother.
Erina Ogura (小倉 エリナ, Ogura Erina)
Voiced by: Masako Jo
Erina is an idol who belongs to the same company as Kirari, yet views her Kirari as a rival and manipulates others in order to interfere with Kirari's progress. She attends the same school as Kirari, and formerly held the position of princess in her class' popularity ranks before Kirari transferred. She has a pet dog named TanTan (たんたん, Tantan; Voiced by: Koichi Sakaguchi).
Fubuki Todo (藤堂 ふぶき, Tōdō Fubuki)
Voiced by: Noriko Shitaya
Fubuki is a former model who transitioned into being an idol. She first dismisses Kirari, but she later regards her as a worthy friend and rival. Because Fubuki comes from a wealthy family and has experienced fame since childhood, she is viewed as spoiled and confidant. She owns a pet cat named Mya-san (みゃ～さん, Myā-san; Voiced by: Hisayo Mochizuki), who is Na-san and Na-yan's brother, and a pet chick named ToriDoshi (とりどし, Toridoshi), who has great physical strength.
Izumi Amakawa (天川 いずみ, Amakawa Izumi) / Hyotaro Izumi (和泉氷太郎, Izumi Hyōtarō)
Voiced by: Ryoka Yuzuki
Izumi is an idol working in the same company as Fubuki and views Kirari a rival for Hiroto's feelings, manipulating staff members and the media in order to keep Kirari away from him. Izumi's identity is revealed as Hiroto's childhood friend, Hyotaro, who had become an idol disguised as a girl after they had both promised each other to become idols as children. He owns a pet cat named Yoka-san (よかっさん, Yokassan; Voiced by: Chiemi Miyata), who wears glasses and has a crush on Na-san.
Cloudy (クラウディ, Kuraudi)
Voiced by: Toru Baba
Cloudy is a new idol working for the Higashiyama Company. He flirts with Kirari as part of the company's orders to sabotage Kirari's career, but he soon falls in love with her for real and eventually quits his company. He apologizes Kirari for sabotaging her so much to the point where she couldn't take it. He also says that he will return to someone's fan and support Kirari as an idol. His real name is Kiriya Hayami (流水霧也, Hayami Kiriya).
Aoi Kirisawa (霧沢 あおい, Kirisawa Aoi)
Voiced by: Chiwa Saito
Aoi is an original character created for the anime. Dubbed the "idol queen", she is a popular idol. She acts very kind and helpful, and is Nojo's 15th top idol winner. Aoi graduates from being an idol and travels around the world pursuing a new career in music, but she and Kirari remain good friends.
Hikaru Mizuki (観月 ひかる, Mizuki Hikaru)
Voiced by: Mai Hagiwara
Hikaru is an original character created for the anime. She is an idol trainee who Kirari mentors and forms the idol unit Kira Pika with her. At first, she acts rude towards Kirari, considering her as some sort of fool. However, she starts to respect her as she teaches her important lessons and helps her out whenever she struggles. The two eventually become close friends and Hikaru thanks Kirari for all her help at last. Afterwards, Hikaru continues her career as a solo singer after their last concert as Kira Pika ends.

=== Family members ===
Takashi Tsukishima (月島 天, Tsukishima Takashi)
Voiced by: Chomenori Yamawaki
Takashi is Kirari's doting father who brought up Kirari by himself. Although he is an easygoing person, he initially opposes the idea of Kirari becoming an idol, but he begins to support her after seeing how serious she is about her career.
Subaru Tsukishima (月島 すばる, Tsukishima Subaru)
Voiced by: Shintaro Asanuma
Subaru is Kirari's brother who resides in America with the hope of having his own idol debut and currently studies acting in New York. He owns a pet cat named Mr. Na (Mr.なー, Mr. Nā; Voiced by: Megumi Shinkawa), who he found at Fifth Avenue.
Grandmother (おばあちゃん, Obaa-chan)
Voiced by: Masako Nozawa
Kirari's grandmother is an original character created for the anime. She encourages Kirari to be an idol since she is a secret fan of Ships, particularly Hiroto.
Luna (ルナ, Runa) / Urara Tsukishima (月島うらら, Tsukishima Urara)
Luna is an original character created for the anime. She is Kirari's mother and a famous actress under the stage name Luna (ルナ, Runa). She asks Kirari to go to Hollywood with her but Kirari refuses and decides to remain in Japan, continuing to be an idol.

=== Managers and producers ===
Chairman Muranishi (村西 社長, Muranishi-shachō)
Voiced by: Susumu Chiba
Muranishi is the chairman of the company that Kirari and Ships belong to. He recognizes the potential that Kirari possesses and makes a lot of arrangements before and after she becomes an idol. He owns a pet mouse named Director Nezumi (ネズミ 会長, Nezumi-kanchō), who is the director of the company and chooses the idols' jobs.
Kasumi Kumoi (雲井 かすみ, Kumoi Kasumi)
Voiced by: Michiko Neya
Kumoi is an original character created for the anime, but she appeared in the manga beginning in volume 9. She is Kirari's manager and was previously an idol under the name Kasumi Hoshino (星野かすみ, Hoshino Kasumi). Although externally a serious and humorless person, she is actually pleased by Kirari's willingness to do her best in every situation.
Shakujii (石神井, Shakujii)
Voiced by: Hisayoshi Izaki
Shakujii is Erina's subservient manager, who tries to fulfill Erina's every request.
Tomo Kamata (鎌田 友雄, Kamata Tomō)
Voiced by: Tetsuharu Ōta
Mr. Kama is an original character created for the anime. He is Kirari and Ships' songwriter.
Kaoruko Higashiyama (東山 薫子, Higashiyama Kaoruko)
Voiced by: Naoko Matsui
Higashiyama is the chairman of the Higanshiyama Company with a crush on Muranishi. Originally, she attempts to sabotage Kirari's career, but after her best stars quit and Muranishi gets upset, she concentrates on making top quality stars instead. She owns a pet alligator named Catherine (キャサリン, Kyasarin).

== Media ==
=== Manga ===
Kirarin Revolution was serialized in the monthly magazine Ciao from the March 2004 issue to the June 2009 issue. The chapters were later released in bound volumes by Shogakukan under the "Ciao Comics" imprint. A total of 14 volumes have been released. Originally, Nakahara planned Kirari's name to be "Konomi Hazuki" and Hiroto's last name to be "Tsukishima."

No.	Japanese release date	Japanese ISBN
01	August 28, 2004	978-4-09-135616-1
02	February 1, 2005	978-4-09-135617-8
03	April 27, 2005	978-4-09-135618-5
04	August 27, 2005	978-4-09-135619-2
05	December 26, 2005	978-4-09-130296-0
06	March 31, 2006	978-4-09-130399-8
07	July 29, 2006	978-4-09-130525-1
08	November 29, 2006	978-4-09-130665-4
09	March 30, 2007	978-4-09-131090-3
10	August 31, 2007	978-4-09-131230-3
11	January 31, 2008	978-4-09-131497-0
12	July 1, 2008	978-4-09-131760-5
13	November 28, 2008	978-4-09-132086-5
14	July 24, 2009	978-4-09-132685-0

=== Anime ===
Kirarin Revolution was adapted into an anime series by SynergySP and G&G Entertainment in 2006. It aired on TV Tokyo from April 7, 2006, to March 27, 2008, for a total of 102 episodes. Koharu Kusumi from Morning Musume was cast as Kirari. Kusumi also performed the opening and ending theme songs, as well as releasing music under Kirari Tsukishima's name. Kusumi noted in her autobiography, 17-sai no Tenshoku, that the anime was originally supposed to last for one year, but due to the success of the show, it was renewed for two more broadcast years.

After the show's third renewal, Kirarin Revolution broadcast its second season with the subtitle Kirarin Revolution Stage 3. The show aired on TV Tokyo from April 8, 2008, to March 27, 2009, for a total of 51 episodes. It was animated by SynergySP and SimImage in 3D animation and HD format. Noel Yukino and Kobeni Hanasaki, new original characters played by Sayaka Kitahara and You Kikkawa from Hello Pro Egg, were added to the main cast. Takuya Ide and Shikou Kanai were cast as the new actors for Ships members Hiroto and Seiji.

In addition to providing the voice to Kirari, Kusumi made crossover appearances at concerts and television shows as her character, including being a recurring guest on Haromoni and Oha Suta, which made her one of the pioneers of the "idol voice actor" crossover beginning in the late 2000s. For the summer of 2007, Mai Hagiwara from Cute was cast as an anime-original character, Hikaru Mizuki, and became part of an anime-original idol subunit Kira Pika with Kusumi for a short story arc, releasing music and making in-character appearances on other television shows on TV Tokyo. During Kirarin Revolution Stage 3's run, the show's new format launched a singing career for new cast and allowed crossover appearances on other television shows as their characters. On April 4, 2008, Ide and Kanai appeared on Oha Suta as their characters for the first time and also had their own in-character segment on the show on Thursdays from April 10, 2008, to May 4, 2009.

In 2007, Viz Media Europe licensed the anime for European release under the title Kilari!

=== Live-action TV series ===
Short live-action drama episodes were aired on Oha Suta, with small segments aired over several days. The cast from the anime series reprised their roles.

No.	Title	Original release date	Original end date
1	"The Secret Behind the New Song "Happy""; Transliteration: "Shin Kyoku "Happy" Tanjō no Himitsu" (Japanese: 新曲「ハッピー☆彡」誕生の秘密)	April 23, 2007	May 2, 2007
Kirari records her newest song, "Happy", with Jake Shimamura, an eccentric music director.
2	"Can Kirari Perform at the WHF Stage?"; Transliteration: "Kirari wa WHF Suteiji ni Deban Dekiru no Ka?" (Japanese: きらりはWHFステージに出演できるのか?)	June 8, 2007	June 21, 2007
3	"Kira Pika Story"; Transliteration: "Kira Pika Sutōrī" (Japanese: きら☆ぴか ストーリー)	July 4, 2007	July 18, 2007
Kirari and Hikaru prepare to debut as an idol sub-group named Kira Pika, but they must resolve their differences to be successful.
4	"Chase After the Mystery Behind the Strange Ring!!"; Transliteration: "Fushigi na Yubiwa no Nazo wo Oe!!" (Japanese: ふしぎなゆびわのなぞをおえ!!)	October 24, 2007	November 6, 2007
5	"The Second Kirari?! Noel Yukino version" Transliteration: "Dai Ni no Kirari!? Yukino Noeru hen" (Japanese: 第2のきらり!? 雪野のえる編)	April 14, 2008	April 18, 2008
Kirari wants Noel to become an idol, but Noel is not interested and wants to play sports.
6	"The Second Kirari?! Kobeni Hanasaki version" Transliteration: "Dai Ni no Kirari!? Hanasaki Kobeni hen" (Japanese: 第2のきらり!? 花咲こべに編)	April 21, 2008	April 25, 2008
Kirari wants Kobeni to become an idol, but Kobeni feels too unconfident.
7	"Kira Revo Plus: The Secret Behind Pa-Pancake"; Transliteration: "Kira Rebo Purasu: Papankēki Tanjo Hiwa" (Japanese: きら☆レボ+ パパンケーキ誕生秘話)	July 7, 2008	July 15, 2008
8	"Kira Revo Plus: The Journey to the Special Live Show"; Transliteration: "Kira Rebo Purasu: Supesharu Raibu e no Michi" (Japanese: きら☆レボ+ スペシャルライブへの道)	September 26, 2008	October 1, 2008
MilkyWay and Ships prepare for their first concert event.
9	"Kira Revo Plus: Rute-Rute version" Transliteration: "Kira Rebo Purasu: Ruterute hen" (Japanese: きら☆レボ+ るてるて編)	October 20, 2008	October 28, 2008
A cursed teru teru bōzu, known as a rute rute, starts pursuing MilkyWay and Ships, causing rain to fall wherever they go.
10	"You're Here"; Transliteration: "Kimi ga Iru" (Japanese: きみがいる)	November 25, 2008	December 1, 2008
"The Mysterious Girl" (謎の女の子, Nazo no Onnanoko): While filming the music video for "Kimi ga Iru", Hiroto and Seiji find a snow fairy princess named Lareine and help her run away from two men in black chasing her.; "Run!" (にげろ！, Nigero!): After Lareine helps Hiroto and Seiji escape, they spend time together in the city.; "Magic?!" (魔法！？, Mahō!?): Hiroto and Seiji are confronted by the men in the park, who try to freeze them with magic. After escaping, they bring Lareine to a ferris wheel.; "You're Here" (きみがいる, Kimi ga Iru): Hiroto and Seiji finish filming their music video. Lareine saves them from the men's attacks, causing crystals to rain on them during the shoot. Satisfied, she returns to her kingdom.
11	"Kira Revo Plus: Happy Happy Sunday! version" Transliteration: "Kira Rebo Purasu: Hapi Hapi Sandē! hen" (Japanese: きら☆レボ+ はぴ☆はぴサンデー!編)	January 26, 2009	January 30, 2009
Hiroto and Kirari switch bodies and must go on with each other's lives without anyone noticing before they can change back.

=== Video games ===
Several video games produced by Konami were released for the Nintendo DS during the show's run. All six games sold a cumulative total of 650,000 copies.

List of Kirarin Revolution games
Game	Details
Kirarin Revolution: Kira Kira Idol Audition Original release date: JP: August 10, 2006	Release years by system: 2006—Nintendo DS
Kirarin Revolution: Kira Kira Idol Audition Original release date: JP: August 10, 2006	Notes: Developed and published by Konami
Kirarin Revolution: Na-san to Issho Original release date: JP: December 7, 2006; FRA: April 29, 2010	Release years by system: 2006—Nintendo DS
Kirarin Revolution: Na-san to Issho Original release date: JP: December 7, 2006; FRA: April 29, 2010	Notes: Developed and published by Konami; Released in France as Kilari: Na-san, Mon Meilleur Ami
Kilari: Become a Star Original release date: JP: July 12, 2007; EU: November 4, 2010	Release years by system: 2007—Nintendo DS
Kilari: Become a Star Original release date: JP: July 12, 2007; EU: November 4, 2010	Notes: Developed and published by Konami; Known as Kirarin Revolution: Mezase! Idol Queen (きらりん☆レボリューション めざせ!アイドルクイーン) in Japan.
Kirarin Revolution: Tsukutte Misechao! Kime Kira Stage Original release date: JP: December 13, 2007	Release years by system: 2007—Nintendo DS
Kirarin Revolution: Tsukutte Misechao! Kime Kira Stage Original release date: JP: December 13, 2007	Notes: Developed and published by Konami
Kirarin Revolution: Minna de Odorou Furi Furi Debut! Original release date: JP: July 24, 2008	Release years by system: 2008—Nintendo DS
Kirarin Revolution: Minna de Odorou Furi Furi Debut! Original release date: JP: July 24, 2008	Notes: Developed and published by Konami
Kirarin Revolution: Atsumete Change! Kurikira Coord Original release date: JP: December 20, 2008	Release years by system: 2008—Nintendo DS
Kirarin Revolution: Atsumete Change! Kurikira Coord Original release date: JP: December 20, 2008	Notes: Developed and published by Konami

==== Trading card game ====
Atlus released a set of trading cards for the series that were compatible with the Kirarin Revolution arcade games available from November 28, 2006, to July 2009. The first set was titled Kirarin Revolution: Happy Idol Life (きらりん☆レボリューション ハッピー★アイドルライフ). The second, released in 2008, was titled Kirarin Revolution: Kuru Kira Idol Days (きらりん☆レボリューション クルキラ★アイドルDays). Along with Takara Tomy's paper doll Millefeui Cards, the Kuru Kira Idol Days cards sold a combined total of 50 million pieces.

== Reception ==
Kirarin Revolution has sold a cumulative total of over 10 million physical copies. It won the 2006 Shogakukan Manga Award for children's manga.

Oricon notes that while actors releasing music as their characters have been notable, Kusumi portraying Kirari Tsukishima in voice and in a real-world context pioneered the "idol voice actor" crossover beginning in the late 2000s, along with Aya Hirano from the Haruhi Suzumiya series. Parallels have been drawn between Kusumi and Kirari, citing their similarities in age, career, and process of becoming an idol, which led Kusumi to be closely associated with the character. In the week of December 24–30, 2007, the Kirarin Revolution anime series had an average viewership rating of 2.6%. Kusumi was named #17 in Daitan Map's "Top 50 Voice Actors of Popular Characters" in 2007 for her role as Kirari.

On his review of the first volume, Carlo Santos from Anime News Network highlighted the focus on friendship, the story's light-hearted tone, and clean artwork as attractive to young readers; at the same time, Santos mentions the story presents a wish fulfillment fantasy and advises critics of the idol industry to "avoid the series entirely." Kirarin Revolution was ranked #6 on Anime News Network's list of "6 Idols that Fandom Forgot", with Lynzee Loveridge stating that despite the series' long run, it failed to attract an audience outside of its target demographic and was quickly forgotten after its end.
