= Masaki Kaji =

Japanese actor and singer (born 1988)

- Born: 加治将樹; Masaki Kaji; January 29, 1988 (age 38); Tokyo, Japan
- Occupations: Actor, singer
- Years active: 2004–present
- Website: Kaji's Official Blog

Masaki Kaji (加治 将樹, Kaji Masaki) is a Japanese actor and singer. He is known for his role as Takeshi Momoshiro in the Prince of Tennis musical series, Tenimyu, and the live film adaptation. He was also part of a young men's stage acting troupe, D-BOYS, which perform in various skit-like performances.

== Biography ==
He has appeared in a various number of TV shows, musicals and movies.

On January 1, 2006, Kaji, with fellow D-BOYS member Hiroki Suzuki, appeared on the 43rd broadcast of Secret New Years' Performance Tournament "Young Man Colosseum", where Kaji displayed his acrobatic abilities. As well, on November 1, 2006, he made an appearance on a variety show called Kachinko (カチンコ!) broadcasting on TV Asahi. Then on January 1, 2007, Kaji appeared again on the New Year's Day 44th annual broadcast of the Secret New Years' Performance Tournament's "Chinese Lion Dance" segment, with Hiroki Suzuki and fellow D-Boys members, Yuya Endo, Masato Wada and former D-BOYS member, Yuuma Minakawa.

He appeared as a member of The Tigers, in the TV drama, The Hit Parade, starring fellow D-Boys members Masato Wada, Yuu Shirota, Hiroki Suzuki, Hirofumi Araki, Yuya Endo and Koji Seto. The show aired May 26, 2006, on Fuji TV.

=== D-Boys ===
In October 2004, Kaji joined the Watanabe Entertainment group named the D-BOYS. As a member of the D-BOYS, Kaji also keeps a blog, which he updates occasionally. Being a part of the D-BOYS provided Kaji with a lot of opportunities. Among them was to perform with the group of boys and expand his experience as a performer. On August 6, 2005, Kaji, along with Hiroki Suzuki, appeared on the radio program, Marvelous Radio Vibration that was hosted by fellow D-Boys members Yuu Shirota and Kotaro Yanagi.

The D-BOYS so far have released two Photobooks. The first photobook released on April 27, 2005, was self-titled D-Boys, while the second, released on March 15, 2006, was called Start, both which contain many photos of Kaji.

The D-BOYS have also starred in their own drama documentary variety series called, DD-Boys in which Kaji's appeared in a few episodes as himself. The show was 24 episodes long and ran from April 10 to September 25, 2006.

In June 2007, the D-BOYS starred in their very own musical together called, D-BOYS STAGE, which ran from June 3 to 10 at the Space Zero theater in Tokyo. Kaji appeared in the musical as a regular performer for the run of the musical.

=== Musicals ===
Kaji won the role of Takeshi Momoshiro, the friendly 2nd year regular of Seigaku Middle School's tennis club, in The Prince of Tennis musical series, Tenimyu. From 2005 to 2006, he became the second actor to play Momoshiro. He made his debut as Momoshiro on January 8, 2005, in the Side Yamabuki performance in Osaka. That same year, his role as Momoshiro was carried into the live adaptation film of the manga. During his run in the musicals, he was able to work with fellow D-BOYS members Yuya Endo, Kotaro Yanagi, Hiroki Suzuki, Masato Wada, Hirofumi Araki, Osamu Adachi, and former member Yuu Shirota.

On March 29, 2006, in the Dream Live 3rd live concert, he, along with the majority of the Seigaku cast, graduated from their roles. Since his graduation, the role of Momoshiro has been played by Shinpei Takagi, by fellow D-BOYS member Tetsuya Makita, and by actor Toshihiro Nobeyama.

=== Live action ===
Kaji was able to carry on his role from the musicals to the live-adaptation film of the manga series of The Prince of Tennis. He, along with most of the principal cast members for the Seigaku Regulars, were able to reprise their roles in the movie. The only major casting change was the casting of Kanata Hongo as Ryoma Echizen, the main protagonist.

The Prince of Tennis was released on May 13, 2006, and opened on the tenth spot in the Japanese box office and marked Kaji's first major film debut.

=== Seishun Energy: Check It Out Yo! in Tokyo ===
After his graduation from Tenimyu, Kaji starred in the first series of the TV drama, Seishun Energy: Check It Out Yo! in Tokyo (青春★ENERGY ~ チェケラッチョ!! In Tokyo), which premiered on Fuji TV April 12, 2006, and broadcast until June 15, 2006. The series was a spinoff from the movie, Check It Out Yo!! (チェケラッチョ!!), was 10 episode long and featured Kaji as Shingo Amida, one of the four main characters. The show was about four 3rd year high school students with no direction in their lives, until they found rap, which then inspired them to take charge of their lives and their dreams. In the show, his character, along with his three costars' (Masataka Kubota, Ryo Kimura, and Gota Watabe) characters formed ROM-4. Later, Kaji and his costars (under ROM-4) recorded and released the CD single called "Keep It Goin' On", which was used as the show's ending theme.

=== Regatta ===
Then, Kaji appeared in the TV drama, Regatta, which premiered on TV Asahi, running from July 14, 2006, to September 8, 2006. The show revolved around a university rowing club, in which Kaji had the role of playing the freshman, Toshiyuki Hoshino, on the team.

=== Musical Air Gear ===
Nearly after a year away from musicals, Kaji starred as Onigiri, member of the Kogarasumaru Air Trecks team, in the first Air Gear musical called, Musical Air Gear (ミュージカル エア・ギア), which debuted on January 7, 2007, and run til January 21, 2007. Performances for the Air Gear musical were held in Tokyo at the Space Zero Theater from January 7 to 14, 2007 and in Osaka at the Theater BRAVA from January 19 to 21, 2007. The cast features Kaji's former Tenimyu co-actors, Kamakari Kenta and KENN, reprising their voice-over roles from the anime respectively as Ikki and Kazu, with RUN&GUN, Kenjiro Tsuda etc. as co-stars.

Due to the success and popularity of the musical's first run, the musical had a rerun in May 2007 titled, Musical Air Gear vs. Bacchus Super Range Remix (ミュージカル「エア・ギア」vs.バッカス Super Range Remix) with Kaji reprising his role as Onigiri, which ran from May 3 to 8, 2007 at the Nihon Seinenkan Dai Hall in Tokyo.

Thus, Kaji is attached, as Onigiri, in the following shows:

- Musical Air Gear
- Musical Air Gear vs. Bacchus Super Range Remix

=== Out of Order ===
Following his performance in the Air Gear Musical, Kaji will appear on stage in the 2007 Out of Order Live Entertainment Show with fellow D-Boys members Yuya Endo and Kumai Kohei. Other cast members also include Jun Nagura, Ken Horiuchi, Chiaki Hara, Asami Abe, Rag Fair etc. Performances will run from March 21, 2007, to March 26, 2007, at the Aoyama Theater in Tokyo and will also run from March 31, 2007, to April 1, 2007, at the Karapa Hall in Osaka.

=== Arakure KNIGHT ===
2007 will see Kaji appear in a string of films. The first will be Arakure KNIGHT (荒くれKNIGHT, Arakure KNIGHT?), the live-action movie adaptation of the 1982 to 1988 manga series, Aratanaru Shobaku by Satosi Yoshida. The film is scheduled for limited released, opening on April 28, 2007, in Cinema GAGA. Kaji will once again act alongside fellow D-Boys member, Yuu Shirota, as well as be reunited with former Tenimyu castmates, Kousuke Kujirai, Yoshikazu Kotani, and Musical Air Gear co-star, Kenta Kamakari.

Previously, in 1998, a live-action TV series had been made titled Shin Shōnan Bakusōzoku Arakure Knight (Bomber Bikers of Shonan).

=== Waruboro ===
Next, Kaji will be appearing in the film Waruboro (ワルボロ), which will star Kaji's costar from Yankee Boukou ni Kaeru and Regatta, Shota Matsuda, as the main character; with Kaji's Seishun Energy: Check It Out Yo! in Tokyo costar Ryo Kimura and fellow D-Boys member, Yuu Shirota as supporting characters. Due to the setting and time period of the movie, Kaji had to perm his hair for his character. The movie is an adaptation of Gettsu Itaya's semi-autobiographical novel, Waruboro, and is set to be released in the summer of 2007 as principal filmography began on September 20, 2006.

=== Personal life ===
Kaji keeps a blog on his D-Boys webpage, which he updates occasionally. In his blog entries he likes to call himself "Karaage" (literally meaning "fried thing"), which is a running joke between him and Hiroki Suzuki, due to Kaji's dislike for his tan. He is very close friends with fellow D-BOYS members Masato Wada (who often regards Kaji as a best friend and younger brother), Hiroki Suzuki, Osamu Adachi and Hirofumi Araki.

On August 12, 2006, he, along with Hiroki Suzuki, attended the second performance showing in Tokyo for the Advancement Side Rokkaku feat. Hyotei Gakuen to support Kousuke Kujirai and Hiroki Aiba.

== Appearances ==
=== Film ===
Year	Title	Role	Other notes	Ref.
2006	Seishun Energy: Check It Out Yo! in Tokyo	Shingo Amida		
2006	The Prince of Tennis	Takeshi Momoshiro		
2007	Arakure Knight			
2007	Waruboro	Toppan		
2022	Nighttime Warbles			
2023	Twilight Cinema Blues	Yōhei Kuwana		
2023	Once Upon a Crime	Hans		
2025	Baka's Identity	Kaizuka		

=== Television ===
Year	Title	Role	Other notes	Ref.
2021	Shimura Ken to Drif no Daibakushō Monogatari	Boo Takagi	Television film	
2022	The Sunflower Disappeared in the Rain	Jun'ichi Morikawa	Miniseries	
2023	Mentsuyu Hitori Meshi	Tsutomu Hokabe	Seasons 1-2	
2026	Brothers in Arms	Kido Kozaemon	Taiga drama	
2026	Song of the Samurai	Sagawa Kanbei		

=== Theatre ===
- March 21 to April 1, 2007, in the Out of Order Live Entertainment Show

=== Musicals ===
TENIMYU: The Prince Of Tennis Musical Series (as Takeshi Momoshiro)

- The Prince of Tennis Musical: Side Yamabuki feat. St. Rudolph (In Winter of 2004–2005)
- The Prince of Tennis Musical: Dream Live 2nd (2005)
- The Prince of Tennis Musical: The Imperial Match Hyotei Gakuen (2005)
- The Prince of Tennis Musical: The Imperial Match Hyotei Gakuen in Winter (In Winter of 2005–2006)
- The Prince of Tennis Musical: Dream Live 3rd (2006)
- January 7 to 21, 2007 as Onigiri in Musical Air Gear
- May 3 to 8, 2007 as Onigiri in Musical Air Gear vs. Bacchus Super Range Remix
- June 3 to 10, 2007 as a regular performer in the D-BOYS STAGE Musical

== Discography ==
=== Singles ===
Kaji has currently released a CD Single on June 21, 2006, called "Keep It Goin' ON" with fellow members, ROM-4. Besides Kaji, ROM-4 comprises Masataka Kubota, Ryo Kimura and Gouta Watabe, Kaji's coactors from the TV show called, Seishun Energy: Check It Out, Yo! in Tokyo.

Singles Stats

Single was released for the Seishun Energy TV show in Japan (JPN), only.

Year	Cover	Title	Album	Chart positions
Year	Cover	Title	Album	JPN
2006		"Keep It Goin' On" (with ROM-4)	Keep It Going ON: Release date: June 21, 2006; 1st CD Single; Formats: CD	174

Track Listings

Track Listings for the Keep It Goin' On CD Single:

1. "Keep It Goin' On"
2. "Keep It Goin' On (SUNSHINE REMIX)"
3. "Keep It Goin' On ～Instrumental～"

== See also ==
- ROM-4
- D-Boys
- Tenimyu
- The Prince of Tennis Movie
- The Prince of Tennis
- Momoshiro Takeshi

Preceded by Eiji Moriyama	Takeshi Momoshiro in the Prince of Tennis Musicals; 2005–2006	Succeeded by Shinpei Takagi
