= Nozomi Sakurai =

Nozomi Sakurai may refer to:

- Nozomi Sakurai, a character from Kamisama Minarai: Himitsu no Cocotama.
- Nozomi Sakurai, a character from Princess Connect! Re:Dive.
