= List of Yu-Gi-Oh! 5D's characters =

The following is a list of characters from the Yu-Gi-Oh! 5D's anime series.

Names refer to the 4K Media English version (the English manga published by VIZ Media also uses 4Kids names), with the original Japanese names presented in the descriptions where available. Some international releases feature alternative names.

== Main characters ==
=== Signers ===
The main characters and their Signer marks. From top to bottom: Yusei Fudo, Jack Atlas, Crow Hogan, Akiza Izinski, Luna, and Leo.

The Signers (シグナー, Shigunā) are people who bear the Mark of the Crimson Dragon (赤き竜, Akakiryū), a deity worshiped by a pre-Incan civilization that defended the world from the Red Nova and the Earthbound Immortals with the help of the Signer Dragons, powerful dragons that have been turned into Duel Monsters cards that the current Signers now possess. Signers are chosen by the Crimson Dragon to protect the world from evil.

==== Yusei Fudo ====
Voiced by: Yuya Miyashita (Japanese); Greg Abbey (English)

Yusei Fudo, the series' main protagonist.

Yusei Fudo (不動 遊星, Fudō Yūsei) is a young man who was born in the Tops district of New Domino City, but ended up at the nearby Satellite due to an incident called Zero Reverse which killed his parents while he was still a toddler. He was raised by his adoptive mother Martha alongside other orphans like Jack and Crow. When he was a teenager, he teamed up with Jack, Crow, and Kalin to form a duel gang known as the Enforcers (Team Satisfaction in the Japanese version) whose goal was to rid the Satellite of all the corrupt duel gangs and make it a better place. A few years later, Yusei built a Duel Runner from scrap parts which is stolen by Jack along with this Stardust Dragon so that he can escape to Neo Domino City. Two years later, Yusei built another one and goes after Jack for revenge. When he travels to New Domino City in order to retrieve his Stardust Dragon from Jack Atlas, he soon discovers that he is a Signer, a person chosen to bear the mark of the Crimson Dragon. While he initially bears the mark of the Crimson Dragon's tail, it is replaced with the Dragon's head following his battle with Goodwin signifying him as the new leader of the Signers. Yusei is a cool, attractive, calm and collected duelist who believes no card is useless, and is admired by many people. Despite this, he is shown to possess guilt for the tragedies that Zero Reverse caused as his father was lead scientist on the project. He values his friends above all and believes the bonds that people share is what gives him hope. It is also implied that Yusei views Akiza as someone who is more than just a friend and is shown to trust her greatly.
Yusei's deck focuses on managing small monsters of various levels in order to summon out more powerful Synchro Monsters, such as Junk Warrior. His key card is Stardust Dragon, his Signer dragon, and he later obtains two further evolutions: the powerful Majestic Star Dragon and the Accel Synchro monster, Shooting Star Dragon. At the end of the series, he is able to perform a Limit Over Accel Synchro to summon his strongest monster, Shooting Quasar Dragon.
At the end of the series, he becomes a scientist and remains in New Domino City to look after it.
In the manga, Yusei Fudo enters the D1GP for a chance to duel Jack Atlas again after losing to him once and to save his friend Sect Ijuin after he is kidnapped by the Skeleton Knight. Yusei still uses a Junk deck but with new Warrior monsters such as Lightning Warrior and Mighty Warrior. Later on he gains a Duel Dragon version of Stardust Dragon called Stardust Spark Dragon.

==== Jack Atlas ====
Voiced by: Takanori Hoshino (Japanese); Ted Lewis (English)
Jack Atlas (ジャック・アトラス, Jakku Atorasu) is known as the "Master of Faster" ("King of Riding Duels" in the Japanese version), and was once Yusei's best friend. He also has a British Accent. Like Yusei, Jack grew up in Satellite and was raised by his adopted mother Martha. He was part of the Enforcers (Team Satisfaction in the Japanese version) when he was a teenager. Unlike Yusei, Jack dreamed of a life away from Satellite in the city where he could become rich and famous. When offered a deal by Lazar, Jack stole Yusei's Stardust Dragon and Duel Runner and left for New Domino City resulting in the two becoming bitter rivals. As a former resident of the Satellite, he hides his past from the rest of society and rose the ranks to become the turbo dueling champion. Jack is later defeated by Yusei in the championship round of the Fortune Cup. He starts off as very arrogant and cruel, but his conscience is revived thanks to a journalist named Carly Carmine, who heals his wounded heart and teaches him to "let the real Jack Atlas live." This along with the support of his friends causes Jack to become the good person he used to be. He is one of the Signers possessing the dragon's wings as his mark.
His signature card is his Signer dragon, Red Dragon Archfiend (Red Demon's Dragon in the Japanese version) which, when granted the power of the Signers, can be upgraded to Majestic Red Dragon. He later achieves Burning Soul, an ability which can summon out Red Nova Dragon (Scarlet Nova Dragon in the Japanese version). He plays a "Power" Deck, focusing on quickly summoning powerful monster to obliterate his opponent's defenses. Jack is one of the six Signers, and carries the Crimson Dragon's Wings. Despite losing to Yusei at the Fortune Cup, he still retains many followers, including the aforementioned Carly, who from Season 3 onwards rivals Mina and Stephanie for Jack's attention. At the end of the series, Jack decides to compete in Duel Circuits around the world; it is revealed in the time skip that he is still the top ranked Turbo Duelist in the world.
In the manga, Jack Atlas is a powerful Turbo Duelist called the King that is known and feared by many. Unlike the anime, Yusei and Jack do not know each other beforehand. Jack uses a King deck based around summoning his ace monster Dark Highlander. Jack also owns the Duel Dragon version of Red Dragon Archfiend called Hot Red Dragon Archfiend which was stolen from him as a kid by Kalin Kessler but it was later given back to him.

==== Crow Hogan ====
Voiced by: Shintarō Asanuma (Japanese); Clay Adams (season 2-3), Tom Wayland (season 4-5) (English)
Crow Hogan (クロウ・ホーガン, Kurō Hōgan) is one of Yusei and Jack's best friends. Born in Satellite, his parents died when he was young, and he was alone until Duel Monsters gave him friends and taught him how to read. He was given the nickname Crow by some other young duelists, since his first card had "Crow" in its name. Like Jack and Yusei, he was raised by his adoptive mother Martha growing up. He later joined the Enforcers (Team Satisfaction in the Japanese version) when he was a teenager. He passes his knowledge on to a group of orphaned children he looks after, and he steals to provide for them acting as Robin Hood- like figure. He reunites with Yusei in the Satellite when the Signers come to take on the Dark Signers. Crow is a selfless person who wants to help those in need so they never have to face the misfortunes he had to. He helps take down the Dark Signers by defeating Greiger and teaming up with Jack and Yusei against Rex Goodwin. After facing Goodwin, Crow inherits the Dragon's tail mark from Yusei, becoming a Signer.
He uses a Blackwing deck that can quickly summon many monsters (a.k.a. "swarming") to win a duel, and his main Synchro Monsters are Blackwing Armed Wing, Blackwing - Silverwind the Ascendant, and Blackwing Armor Master. He later obtains his own Signer Dragon, Black-Winged Dragon. His custom Duel Runner, Blackbird, has a built-in Flying Formation used to cross large gaps and can also fire hooks to change direction. Towards the end of the series, he becomes part of the police force in New Domino City. In the time skip shown in the final episodes, Crow was a part of a top ranked dueling team, however he decides to quit the team in order to challenge Jack, and recommends Leo as his replacement.
In the manga, Crow Hogan enters the D1GP in hopes of giving his younger brother Yoshi the courage to go through a serious operation. He is a skilled duelist capable of summoning two or three Synchro Monsters in a single turn. Crow uses a Blackwing Deck but with new monsters like the Blackwing Tamers. Later on, he gains his own Duel Dragon: Blackfeather Darkrage Dragon.

==== Akiza Izinski ====
Voiced by: Ayumi Kinoshita (Japanese); Bella Hudson (English)
Akiza Izinski, known as Aki Izayoi (十六夜 アキ, Izayoi Aki) in Japan, is a girl with mysterious psychic powers that enable her to materialize Duel Monsters during a duel along with their abilities and attacks. Born in Neo Domino City to a senator and his wife, Akiza lived peacefully until her power along with her mark awoke when she was young, and caused her to be an outcast as a result. Trying to help her, her parents sent her to Duel Academy hoping someone could help her control her powers, but she interpreted this as sending her away. She began dueling underground, earning the nickname the "Black Rose" ("Black Rose Witch" in the Japanese version) due to her abilities. She was later taken in by the Arcadia Movement, an organization filled with psychic duelists like her. They manipulated her and caused her to become a cold and sadistic person. Akiza possessed a great hate for her mark, believing it to be the root of all of her problems. However, after her second duel with Yusei, she learns to accept herself and her powers as it makes her a part of something bigger. She also decides to make up with her parents and let go of her cold and sadistic personality. It is shown that Akiza has since developed a crush on Yusei which grows stronger over the course of the series. Her mark is one of the Crimson Dragon's claws.
Her deck is based around Plant-Type Monsters that focus of trying to summon the Black Rose Dragon, her Signer Dragon. Her deck also possesses many cards that allow Black Rose Dragon to stay on the field or revive it if needed.
She, along with Leo, Luna, and their friends, attends Duel Academy where she is considered one of the best duelists in the school. She later becomes a Turbo Duelist and become a reserve member of Team 5D's in the WRGP. At the end of the series, despite graduating the Duel Academy at the top of her class, Akiza leaves New Domino City to study medicine in Europe. Before leaving, she meets Yusei one more time and almost confesses feelings for him, but ultimately decides not to. Despite this, Yusei and Akiza share a moment before they go their separate ways. In the future, she becomes a doctor and promises herself she'll reunite with Yusei again.
In the manga, Aki is a popular and powerful psychic duelist at the Queen's Duel Academy. She is so popular that she is given the title; Queen of Queens. She enters the D1GP tournament in hopes of dueling Jack Atlas again but she was defeated by Kalin Kessler before she could reach him. Aki uses a Plant/Angel based deck featuring monsters such as Queen Angel of Roses and Rosaria, The Stately Fallen Angel. Later on, she would be given her own Duel Dragon by Rex Goodwin called Black Rose Moonlight Dragon.

==== Leo ====
Voiced by: Ai Horanai (Japanese); Meghan McCracken (seasons 1–2), Eileen Stevens (seasons 3–4) (English)
Leo, known as Lua (龍亞, Rua) in Japan, is the lively and blundering twin brother of Luna who was born in the Tops of Neo Domino City to parents who are often working. Originally not a Signer, he befriends all the Signers and shows great support for the Signers against the Dark Signers. He idolizes both Yusei and Jack and is always looking after his sister Luna. During a life-or-death battle against Aporia in the final season of the anime series, Leo's desire to protect Luna makes him the sixth and final Signer, with the Mark of the Crimson Dragon's Heart.
He plays a "Morphtronic" deck ("D-Former" in the Japanese version), with transforming monsters that have different abilities in attack and defense position, and his key card is Power Tool Dragon. He also comes into possession of the final Signer Dragon and true form of Power Tool Dragon: Life Stream Dragon. Life Stream Dragon is also a Synchro Tuner monster which Yusei used in his final battle to summon out his strongest monster, Shooting Quasar Dragon. At the end of the series, Leo and Luna both leave New Domino City to be with their parents. A few years after the leaving Neo Domino City, Leo and Luna are shown to be living in London, with Leo dropping Luna at university and shown to be selected as Crow's replacement on his racing team.
In the manga, Leo along with his sister, is an eliminator hired by Rex Goodwin to remove any weak Duelists from the D1GP and to find people who can wield the Duel Dragon cards. Abandoned by their parents when they were young, Leo and Luna entered underground Turbo Dueling to earn money to survive. At first they were a great success but Luna came down with an unknown illness and Leo had to Duel by himself to get enough money to pay for her medicine. Without his sister to cheer him on, Leo began to lose horribly, causing people that bet on him to become angry and beat him up. Lazar approached Leo and offered him a job to pay for his sister's medicine. In Duels, both Leo and Luna share a Duel Runner and the same deck consisting of his "Morphtronic" Spell and Trap cards and her "Forest" monster cards. Leo's ace monsters are the Duel Dragons: Ancient Pixie Dragon and Power Tool Mecha Dragon.

==== Luna ====
Voiced by: Yuka Terasaki (Japanese); Meghan McCracken (seasons 1-2), Eileen Stevens (seasons 3-4) (English)
Luna, known as Luca (龍可, Ruka) in Japan, is the calm and collected twin sister of Leo. At a young age, Luna fell into a coma and entered the Realm of Duel Monster Spirits, where she met Ancient Fairy Dragon and promised to protect her. This was how she gained her Signer mark along with her ability to talk to Duel Monster Spirits. Although she had since forgotten this experience, she comes to remember during the Fortune Cup. It was later revealed that the Duel Monster Spirit World was overtaken by Devack's Earthbound Immortal and has caused the world to fall into chaos. Luna along with Leo defeat Devack and save the spirit just as she promised. She tries to avoid dueling as much as possible as it causes her to become tired. Her birthmark is one of the Crimson Dragon's Claws.
She plays a "Fairy/Spirit" deck that is full of other duel monster spirits she met such as "Sunlight Unicorn" and "Kuribon." Her Signer dragon is the Ancient Fairy Dragon, which she retrieved after defeating Devack. At the end of the series, Luna and Leo both leave New Domino City to be with their parents and Luna is shown to be attending college in what appears to be London.
In the manga, Luna along with her brother, is an eliminator hired by Rex Goodwin to remove any weak Duelists from the D1GP and to find people that can wield the Duel Dragon cards. Abandoned by their parents when they were young, Leo and Luna entered underground Turbo Dueling to earn money to survive. At first they were a great success but Luna came down with an unknown illness though she does become better.

== Supporting characters ==
Mina Simington / Mikage Sagiri (狭霧 深影（さぎりみかげ）, Sagiri Mikage)
Voiced by: Aiko Aihashi (Japanese); Carrie Keranen (English)
Mina is Rex Goodwin's secretary who was sent to watch over Jack Atlas while he was the King of Duelists. She is often very concerned over Jack and tries her best to be useful, despite Jack's cold attitude towards her. She is the only one who knows that Jack's feelings for Carly are his true motivation for fighting the Dark Signers. She is shown to have feelings for Jack (though he doesn't seem to reciprocate) and envies Carly for the attention he gives her. Following the Dark Signers incident, she becomes a chief in the Special Security Investigation with Trudge as her assistant.
Tetsu Trudge / Tetsu Ushio (牛尾 哲, Ushio Tetsu)
Voiced by: Koji Ochiai (Japanese); Dan Green (English)
Tetsu is a Security Officer who observes the residents of Satellite. He initially duels using a "Guard" deck, but after his first clash with Yusei, he upgrades to a specially-designed "Pursuit" deck, with uses Goyo Guardian as its main Synchro of choice. He is violent, but also takes great pride in being a duelist, and for this Yusei respects him. After losing to Yusei, Trudge vows to defeat and arrest him, no matter how long it takes. After the first confrontation between Yusei and the Dark Signers (through a Shadow Drone), Trudge falls under their control, becoming a Shadow Drone himself. He challenges Jack to a duel while Jack is still recovering from his injuries from the Fortune Cup finals match against Yusei. Trudge uses a Worm-based deck that focuses on decking out. Just like the other brainwashed Dark Signers, Trudge returns to normal after being defeated by Jack. He later reappears to help Mina spy on Jack and brings the Signers to Martha's home where he develops a deeper respect for the people of Satellite. He is also shown to have a crush on Mina, and is incredibly jealous of Jack. As time goes on, Trudge becomes less hateful and shows more concern for his allies. Following the Dark Signer incident, he becomes Mina's assistant in an Investigation unit. He is also an examiner who tests those looking to acquire a license for Turbo Duels. It has been revealed that he is the same Tetsu that picked on Yugi Muto at Domino High, in the Yu-Gi-Oh! original series.
In the dubbed version, Tetsu has a rivalry with Yusei going for some time. The pilot dub shown at Comic-Con referred to him by his Japanese name, Ushio, rather than Trudge.
In the manga, Tetsu was a contestant in the D1GP who managed to reach the second stage of the tournament. However he was defeated by Leo and Luna shortly afterwards.
Carly Carmine / Carly Nagisa (カーリー・渚, Kārī Nagisa)
Voiced by: Li-Mei Chiang (season 2-3), Aki Kanada (season 4) (Japanese); Veronica Taylor (English)
First appearing in season 2, Carly is a reporter who came from the country to seek out her dreams. In the English dub, she is a blogger working as an intern who hopes to become a true reporter. She has long black hair and wears thick glasses. She tends to get pushed around by others as she attempts to obtain a big scoop and is generally called "Stutter Stammer Carly" due to her nervousness. She uses a "Fortune Fairy" Deck to predict her fortune and get tips for the day. Despite her anxiety, she is a truly good person and gets her happiness from seeing others try hard.
She safeguards Jack for a short while and garners some affection for him, but he leaves her behind to avoid getting her involved with the Signer battles. However, she infiltrates the Arcadia Movement and is sent crashing through a window after losing to the movement's leader Sayer. In the original, she dies from the fall, but in the dub, her fall is prevented. She is revived as a Dark Signer herself, with an alternate vengeful personality. She brandishes a birthmark of the Hummingbird, a "Fortune Lady" deck with monsters that grow gradually stronger with each turn, and the Earthbound Immortal Aslla piscu, whose effect triggered to win her rematch with Sayer just a few moments later. Despite the new persona, the true Carly still exists within her and desires to be with Jack. She ends up dueling Jack, and she shows him a vision in which they are together as Dark Signers, but Jack aims to reach her true desires. He confesses his love for her and is willing to sacrifice himself to make her understand. While he manages to reach her, the Earthbound Immortal takes over Carly and Jack is forced to fight her. Jack tries to play the trap Shock Wave to destroy his Majestic Red Dragon that would cause the duel to end in a tie, but Carly activates one of her trap cards before Jack, ending the duel with her as the loser. Carly tells Jack that she will always be cheering him on and that she loves him, before dying. She is revived by Goodwin as he fades away. She reappears in the third season, occasionally helping Jack out but facing competition for his attention. While her memories of her time as a Dark Signer have disappeared, her feelings for Jack have not.
Carly makes a brief cameo in the manga. She can be seen in the stands cheering when Jack Atlas appears.
Lazar / Yeager (イェーガー, Yēgā)
Voiced by: Tetsuya Yanagihara (Japanese); Gary Mack (English)
Lazar is Goodwin's assistant and Director of the Neo Domino Security Division. He comes from a family of clowns and enjoys eating cup ramen. In the third season, he pledges allegiance to the Three Emperors of Yliaster, but later goes into hiding with his wife and son when he learns more about their plans. While generally composed, he gets rather jittery under pressure. He uses a 'Jester Deck', which focuses on sealing Synchro monsters. After his hideout is discovered by Team 5D's, he decides to cooperate with them. After Yliaster is defeated, Lazar becomes the first elected Mayor of New Domino City when a civilian government is established in the city, replacing the Public Security Maintenance Bureau.

From left to right: Tank, Blitz, Nervin, and Rally Dawson.(Taka, Nerve, Blitz and Rally)

Rally Dawson (ラリー・ドーソン, Rarī Dōson)

Voiced by: (Japanese); Bella Hudson (English)

Rally is a young boy who idolizes his friend Yusei. He steals a chip to assist Yusei in his duel against Jack. In return, Yusei helps him out when Rally is targeted by Security because of the marker on his cheek. While Rally's main deck is never seen, his specialty is 'One Shot' monsters. Rally gave one of his monsters, Turbo Booster, to Yusei for good luck. During Yusei's duel with Roman, Roman uses Rally as a human shield. Rally uses the effect of his Turbo Cannon to destroy the Earthbound Immortal Uru, thereby sacrificing himself to save Yusei. Rally returns when Yusei defeats Roman.
Greiger / Bommer (ボマー, Bomā)
Voiced by: Keiji Hirai (Japanese); Sean Schemmel (English)
Greiger is a physically well-built Duelist, first seen in the Fortune Cup tournament, battling first against Leo (who was posing as Luna), then against Yusei. He is from Central America, and he believes his village was used by Goodwin as the site of an "experiment" to summon the Crimson Dragon. The experiment completely destroyed the village, resulting in the disappearance of Greiger's younger brother and sister. Greiger is enraged to learn the truth prior to his match with Yusei, and he attempts to take revenge on Goodwin for his village's destruction.
When Greiger loses, he reveals the truth to the audience before using his Duel Runner to rocket toward the box room to take out Goodwin. Yusei stops Greiger, who is soon arrested by Security for his attempt on Goodwin's life. Greiger is publicly labeled insane to discredit his word against Goodwin and sentenced to death. However, he is later set free by Devack and brought before Roman. Roman makes him a Dark Signer and gives him the whale birthmark to exact vengeance. Believing that the Signers caused the destruction of his village, he sets off to defeat Goodwin and Yusei. While hunting them, Greiger ends up dueling Crow and he learns that the Dark Signers caused his village's destruction, and its residents, including his brother and sister, are being used for his Earthbound Immortal's summoning. Crow defeats the Earthbound Immortal to free Greiger's people. Defeated, Greiger tells Yusei and Crow to beat the Dark Signers before he disappears. Greiger later returns after Goodwin's defeat.
In the manga, Greiger was once called "The Undefeated Giant" but he was defeated by Jack Atlas who mocked him for not being any challenge to him. Greiger enters the D1GP for a chance to get revenge on Jack. His first opponent was Yusei Fudo. Despite putting up a good fight, he lost to Yusei and blamed the loss on himself for being too focused on his revenge on Jack.
Greiger's deck is fairly solid, focusing on his three "Reactor" monsters, who can inflict damage the first time their opponent summons a monster, or activate a Spell or Trap card each turn. His Ace Monsters are his "Flying Fortress SKY FIRE", which is a combination of his three Reactor monsters, and his Synchro Monster "Dark Strike Fighter". While a Dark Signer, Greiger brandishes the Earthbound Immortal Chacu Challua, which can inflict damage in defense mode with half of its defense points and prevent its opponents from attacking. He also controls a Dark Synchro monster, Dark Fleet Top, which special summons Flying Fortress SKY FIRE from his graveyard each turn. In the manga Greiger uses a fusion-based deck that allows him to summon fusion monsters more quickly.
Sherry LeBlanc (シェリー・ルブラン, Sherī Ruburan)
Voiced by: Erika Nakagawa (Japanese); Eileen Stevens (English)
Sherry is a Turbo Duelist from France. She belonged to a rich family until her parents were killed by Yliaster when she was young, and she is now under the care of her butler, Elsworth. She sets out to find the people who killed her parents and originally wishes for Yusei to team up with her as she is aware of his power as a Signer. After being rejected by Yusei, she enters the WRGP with Elsworth as her only teammate to learn about Yliaster and find out the secret behind a mysterious card that her parents left behind for her. However, during a mission with Yusei and Bruno, she becomes separated from them in a wormhole and ends up in an alternate dimension where she meets Z-One. Sherry is shown the twisted future and becomes Z-One's ally after offering to rewrite her past so her parents didn't die. However, she is defeated by Akiza and Crow and shown the light. She uses a deck centered around her two ace "Fleur" monsters, the Sorcière and the Chevalier.
In the manga, Sherry is a Psychic Duelist and one of the best alongside Aki in Duel Academy Sanctuary. However Aki would leave the academy as she became disgusted with the way the duelists treated others. Sherry holds a grudge against Aki because of this as she believed that she ran away from her responsibility. Sherry plays a Magical Elf deck based on guessing cards in her opponent's hands. As a Psychic Duelist she has an ability called "Hand Scan" which as the name implies allows her to look into her opponents hand and see whichever card they are holding.
Kalin Kessler / Kyosuke Kiryu (鬼柳 京介, Kiryū Kyōsuke)
Voiced by: Yūki Ono (Japanese); Marc Diraison (English)
Kalin was once the leader of a group called The Enforcers ("Team Satisfaction" in the Japanese version) with Yusei, Jack and Crow. The group would go around battling rival duel gangs (In the English dub, The Enforcers defeat Satellite gangs in order to make Satellite a safer place; after defeating all the gangs, Kalin finds Security as the enemy). As time went on however, he became a bit more sadistic against his opponents and started going out of control and hurting his opponents as a result, which caused Crow, Jack and Yusei to leave. Kalin decides to provoke Security and murders a Security officer (This was removed in the dub). When Yusei tries to take the blame for it, his attempt fails and Kalin is arrested. Misunderstanding the situation and believing Yusei had sold him out, he later becomes a Dark Signer, branded with the Giant birthmark, in order to get his revenge on Yusei. Their first duel is canceled due to a malfunction on Yusei's Duel Runner, but he loses his second duel with Yusei, when Yusei's feelings allows him to breakthrough to Kalin and defeat him. He forgives Yusei and admits he was wrong to think that Yusei sold him out before vanishing.
He is revived after Goodwin's defeat, but still has memories of being a Dark Signer and the crimes he committed. He goes to a place called Crash Town looking for a way to die. In Crash Town, a duel occurs at sunset and the loser of the duel is shipped off to the mines. Yusei is called by a woman named Barbara to save Kalin. They are soon both betrayed, captured and taken to work in a mine, though Yusei manages to free him. While assisting two siblings, West and Nico, in rescuing their father, Kalin regains his will to live. He decides to stay behind in Crash Town to rebuild and look after the villagers. Kalin also renames the town "Satisfaction Town" after his old team.
In the manga, Kalin was once a prisoner in a facility owned by Rex Goodwin. He and Jack Atlas dueled each other to earn their freedom but Kalin threw the match as he didn't want to leave the other kids behind. As a reward for winning, Goodwin gave a Duel Dragon card to Jack. Annoyed by this, Kalin steals the card and destroy the facility with explosives. Kalin would meet Jack years later and gives back the card he stole from him. Then they decide to have a Duel to settle the scores between them.
He uses an "Infernity" Deck that specializes in effects when the player has no cards in his hand. His Dark Signer deck additionally has two key monsters: a Dark Synchro Monster called Hundred Eyes Dragon, which can gain the effects of the monsters in his graveyard, and the Earthbound Immortal Ccapac Apu, which inflicts additional damage for every monster it destroys. His Dark Signer birthmark is based on the giant Nazca line. In Crash Town, it is revealed that he has his own Ace, the Synchro Monster Infernity Doom Dragon. In the manga, Kalin still uses an Infernity deck but with new monsters and he supports his deck with the Void trap card series. His Ace monster is the Duel Dragon: Void Ogre Dragon.
Martha (マーサ, Māsa)
Voiced by: Kimiko Saitō
Martha is a woman who lives in Satellite and works as an assistant for Dr. Schmidt. She was a foster parent for Yusei, Jack and Crow while they were growing up in Satellite. In Episode 46, she falls into a geoglyph when trying to save the Satellite boy Taka. Her soul is then sacrificed to Roman's Earthbound Immortal Uru. She returns when Yusei defeats Roman, and is seen to be continuing her work as a foster mother for many of the orphaned children of Satellite.
Bolt Tanner / Jin Himuro (氷室 仁, Himuro Jin)
Voiced by: Taiten Kusunoki (Japanese); Wayne Grayson (English)
Tanner is a former Turbo Duel champion. At the Detention Center, he starts as a ruthless bully, but becomes an ally of Yusei after being defeated in a duel. During his time at the cell, he was beaten by Armstrong in an attempt to anger Yusei. He is later freed by Blister and helps Yusei during the Fortune Cup. After becoming Yusei's ally, he is given information about the Signers. He and Yanagi then move to Leo and Luna's house. He plays an "Ushi Oni Beatdown" deck. His Ace Monster is Great Ushi Oni, which he gives to Yusei in order to make contact with Blister.
In the manga, he was one of the contestants in the D1GP and was Crow's first opponent. Bolt lost to him through a One Turn Kill. He played a Machina deck.
Tenzen Yanagi (矢薙 典膳, Yanagi Tenzen)
Voiced by: Bunmei Tobayama (Japanese); Marc Thompson (English)
Yanagi is an eccentric old man and former traveler, who befriends Yusei after being detained in the New Domino City Detention Center. Despite his over-eagerness and erratic behavior, he knows several things concerning the Signers and the Five Dragons. He duels Tanner and is quickly defeated. When Yusei was transferred to another cell, Yanagi was beaten by Armstrong to make Yusei angry. He is freed by Blister and continues to cheer for Yusei during the Fortune Cup. After Yusei wins the Fortune Cup, Yanagi explains to Yusei, Leo, Luna and Tanner about the Crimson Dragon, telling them that it is only possible to call it out when all five Signers are together. This gives Yusei the clue that the last Signer appeared. Yanagi and Tanner then move to Leo and Luna's house. He plays a "Hidden Treasure" deck, based on legendary treasures from all over the world, which he takes great pride in, despite the fact the majority of the cards cause self-inflicted damage.
Blister / Saiga (雑賀)
Voiced by: Hidenobu Kiuchi (Japanese); Tom Wayland (English)
Blister is old friend of Tanner and he was once a top Turbo Duel Champion until his partner, Aero (Yūji (ユージ) in the Japanese version), was injured in an accident. Aero sends Blister the burned Machina Sniper card, which was a symbol of their friendship, and Blister thinks that he will never forgive Aero. Yusei helps Blister regain his faith in his friends, and Blister helps Yusei prepare his Duel Runner for the Fortune Cup. He later sneaks into the Satellite to help Yusei's friends, and stays at Martha's house looking after the children. Following the defeat of the Dark Signers and Goodwin, Blister meets up with Yusei again when he, Jack and Crow hear about the story of Mr. Bashford.
Ancient Fairy Dragon (エンシェント・フェアリー・ドラゴン, Enshento Fearī Doragon)
Voiced by: Mika Doi (Japanese); Veronica Taylor (English)
Ancient Fairy Dragon is one of the six Signer Dragons. During the time of the Zero Reverse incident, when Professor Fudo reclaimed the Dragon cards from Roman, Ancient Fairy was left behind and went into the possession of Devack. When Luna first visited the Spirit Realm, she was asked by Ancient Fairy Dragon to protect the monsters there. Later on, Ancient Fairy Dragon becomes imprisoned in a mountain by a seal, but is able to contact Luna telepathically. With the help of Regulus, Torunka and Leo, Luna is able to rescue Ancient Fairy Dragon and defeat Devack. As a Synchro Monster, Ancient Fairy Dragon is able to destroy an opponent's Field Spell Card and recover life points. This is a valuable skill, because Earthbound Immortals rely on Field Spell Cards.
Torunka (トルンカ)
Voiced by: Aki Kanada (Child) Hiroshi Naka (Adult) (Japanese); Mike Sinterniklaas(Child) Sean Schemmel (Adult) (English)
Torunka is a Dark Sage whom Luna encounters when she arrives in the Minus World. Torunka helps her search for Regulus. His age is reverted to that of a child due to effects of the Minus Curse, and he forgets all his spells. He returns to his normal age when Zeman the Ape King is defeated.
Regulus (レグルス, Regurusu)
Voiced by: Rintarō Nishi (Japanese); TJ Del Reno (English)
Regulus is a white lion who serves the Ancient Fairy Dragon. He is reluctant at first, because he is infected by a Minus Staff. When Luna frees him from the curse and he notices she is a Signer, he decides to help her free Ancient Fairy Dragon from her seal. When Devack is defeated and Ancient Fairy Dragon freed, Regulus becomes a monster in Luna's deck that can deal damage when Ancient Fairy Dragon is removed from play.
Elsworth / Mizoguchi (ミゾグチ)
Voiced by: Takashi Matsuyama (Japanese); Eric Stuart (English)
Elsworth is the butler and guardian of Sherry LeBlanc. He has been protecting her since her parents were killed. He is also Sherry's partner in the WRGP. He uses a "Bushido" deck revolving around swordsmen, and his ace monster is the synchro monster Driven Daredevil.
Kaz / Soichi Kazama (風馬走一, Kazama Sōichi)
Voiced by: Kōichi Yokota (Japanese); Marc Thompson (English)
Kaz is a Sector Security Officer. He is first introduced when he gets injured during an undercover mission because of Jack's interference. However, he later becomes friends with Jack and is generally willing to back him up when necessary.

== Antagonists ==
=== Dark Signers ===
Dark Signers (ダーク・シグナー, Dāku Shigunā) are the antagonists of the second arc of the show, who fight against the Crimson Dragon and the Signers. Dark Signers are born when someone who has died (usually someone wanting revenge on a Signer) is resurrected by an Earthbound Immortal (Earthbound God in the Japanese version), evil entities imprisoned in the Nazca Lines by the Crimson Dragon. Infused with dark powers and possessing dark cards, the Dark Signers are able to form a barrier around their opponents, initiating a Shadow Duel where attacks from monsters cause real damage. Sometimes, if the Dark Signer is showing weakness or resistance, the Earthbound Immortal itself can take over the Dark Signer's body. Dark Signers have special cards called Dark Tuner Monsters that can summon Dark Synchro Monsters with a negative level. They also have an Earthbound Immortal, represented by their birthmarks. When summoned, these monsters sacrifice the souls of anyone caught within the Dark Signer's geoglyph (with the exception of the duelists, Signers, and anyone protected by a barrier emitted by a Signer's birthmark). Their common attribute is the ability to attack directly and not be chosen as a target, although some circumstances allow them to attack monsters and be attacked themselves. In the anime, they are unaffected by Spell and Trap cards.

There are also Dark Signer-like figures (called Shadow Drones in the dub) who are recruited and controlled by Roman's spiders. They only have access to Dark Tuner and Dark Synchro Monsters. When these Shadow Drones are defeated, their Mark of the Shadows and Deck disappear, and they lose their memories of being possessed. According to Goodwin, a true Dark Signer cannot be returned to normal, because they have already died. In addition, their duels end with the losing duelist being killed (in the dub, the loser is sent to the Netherworld). When a true Dark Signer is defeated, all the souls that were used for summoning their Earthbound Immortal are freed (this also seems to apply to non-Dark Signers who were defeated in Shadow Duels). After Goodwin and the King of the Netherworld are defeated, Goodwin and Roman pass on to the afterlife while Carly, Misty, and Devack are revived with no memory of their time as Dark Signers. Kalin is later shown to still remember his time as a Dark Signer, as well as Greiger.

Rex Goodwin/Godowin (レクス・ゴドウィン, Rekusu Godowin)
Voiced by: Shinya Kote (Japanese); Murray Thom (English)
Rex Goodwin is the leader of the Yliaster cell working in New Domino City and the Director of Sector Security. He, alongside his brother Roman, was an assistant to Professor Fudo during the Zero Reverse accident. With his elitism, he transformed the city into a hierarchical society. He shows interest in the Signers, and he explains their significance to Jack prior to holding the Fortune Cup to gather the remaining Signers and awaken their powers. Rex is shown to be aggressive if necessary, but he usually has a calm demeanor. A legendary Turbo Duelist, Goodwin lost his left arm around the time he didn't finish Daedalus Bridge (the only means for the Satellite to be connected with New Domino City) and had it replaced with a cybernetic one which doubles as his duel disk. He additionally possesses his brother's severed arm with the head part of the Mark of the Dragon. In the dub he claims to be the fifth Signer, but it is not actually so. But after the deaths of the Dark Signers, Rex reveals himself to have become one of them during a duel with Roman, having the condor birthmark on his back and control of the Earthbound Immortal Wiraqocha Rasca. Furthermore, he integrates his brother's arm onto himself to gain the power of a Signer as part of his plan to use both the Earthbound Immortals and the Crimson Dragon to recreate the world in his image. He is defeated by the joint efforts of Yusei, Jack and Crow, and passes onto the afterlife with Roman. His ace is the Synchro Monster Sun Dragon Inti and the Dark Synchro Monster Moon Dragon Quilla.
In the manga, Rex Goodwin hosts the D1 Grand Prix or D1GP for short in order to find the Emperor of Turbo Duels. But as he reveals to Yusei, the real reason for the tournament is to gather Duelists that can wield the power of the Duel Dragons to "save the world from The Skeleton Knight". Rex uses a Celestial deck based on trapping his opponents in a loop. His Duel Dragon is Ascension Sky Dragon and its effect is similar to Slifer the Sky Dragon from the original series which is to gain attack points based on how many cards the user is holding in his hand and can resurrect itself by bring back its summoning materials from the Graveyard. In the end, he reveals that he was using them all along to obtain the power from the Ultimate God and, by leeching the power from every duelist, to become a god himself. Yusei then challenges him to lead to a duel in the sky where he uses his new god card, Ultimaya Tzolkin, to summon the duelists duel dragons to fight for him. Ultimaya Tzolkin's effect is that when you place a card face down in the spell and trap zone, you can special summon a duel dragon from the extra deck and if there is a duel dragon on your side of the field, Ultimaya Tzolkin cannot be targeted for an attack or effect.
Roman Goodwin/Rutger Godowin (ルドガー・ゴドウィン, Rudogā Godowin)
Voiced by: Taketora (Japanese); Marc Thompson (English)
Roman is the leader of the Dark Signers. He possesses a birthmark resembling the Spider Nazca line and can use it to send out spiders that can possess civilians, turning them into Dark Signers, and giving them Shadow powers and Dark Tuner and Synchro Monsters. The spiders can also be used as a means of surveillance, reporting all they have found once they return to their owner. Roman reveals himself to be Rex Goodwin's big brother and an assistant to Professor Fudo (Yusei's Father), until he met a mysterious man from Yliaster. The man told him to look into Ener-D's light and learn about the Earthbound Immortals' battle against the Crimson Dragon. Though revealed to be the fifth Signer, Roman betrays Professor Fudo and causes the Zero Reverse incident after ripping his own arm off and giving it to Rex, telling him to unite the Signers. The resulting explosion transforms Roman into a Dark Signer.
Like Rex, Roman has a bionic arm, which he uses to trigger explosives. He is defeated by Yusei, but before he dies, he triggers an explosion that sends Yusei down into the pool of Ener-D. His deck focuses around Spider type monsters, and specializes in changing an opponent's monster into defense mode to obtain counters for summoning his Earthbound Immortal Uru. Uru can control an opponent's monster by sacrificing one of his own. Roman is later defeated by Yusei, but he sets off an explosive in his mechanical arm before crumbling to dust, so that Yusei would fall into the gate to the Netherworld. His spirit remains in the world until Goodwin is defeated, at which point Roman joins his brother in the afterlife. His ace is the Dark Synchro Underground Arachnid.
Roman appears in the manga and is revealed to be the Skeleton Knight.
Devack/Demak (ディマク, Dimaku)
Voiced by: Kenji Nomura (Japanese); Scottie Ray (English)
Devack is another Dark Signer who has Ancient Fairy Dragon in his possession. Devack hates the Signers although his reason for doing so is never explained. He possesses the birthmark of the monkey and the Earthbound Immortal Cusillu. During the chaos surrounding Carly and Misty's duels, he frees Greiger, who was being escorted by Sector Security and recruits him for the Dark Signers. He duels Leo and Luna in the Spirit World, but is defeated and turns to dust when Luna reappears and reclaims Ancient Fairy Dragon. He is the first Dark Signer to be defeated, when he is beaten by Leo and Luna. After Goodwin's defeat, Devack is revived.
Like his birthmark, his deck features Monkey monsters, including the Dark Synchro Monster Zeman the Ape King, which focuses around increasing the power of his monsters in play through the number of monsters in his graveyard. He is also able to use captured spirits from the Spirit World in order to summon his Earthbound Immortal Cusillu, who can avoid destruction and cut its opponent's life points in half if Devack sacrifices his other monsters in order to do so.
Misty Tredwell/Misty Lola (ミスティ・ローラ, Misuti Rōra)
Voiced by: Junko Minagawa (Japanese); Carrie Keranen (English)
Misty is a famous model who can read someone based on facial appearance. When her younger brother, Toby, dies (or disappears, in the dub), Misty's depression causes her to drive off a cliff (in the dub, she just crashes her car), which results in her resurrection as a Dark Signer with the lizard birthmark and the Earthbound Immortal Ccarayhua. Ccarayhua destroys all cards in play on both sides of the field when it is destroyed.
Misty seeks out Akiza, the person she alleges as responsible for Toby's death/disappearance, and duels her with the intent of gaining revenge. Their duel, however, is postponed due to the aftershock of Carly's duel with Sayer, so Misty waits for Akiza at the Lizard control unit. She duels Akiza again in the Hall of Mirrors of an old carnival site, while showing Akiza events from the past to lower her spirit. However, Misty eventually learns that Sayer was the one who killed Toby, and after using Ccarayhua to take revenge on Sayer, she is defeated by Akiza, who stops the Earthbound Immortal inside of Misty. Misty is revived by Goodwin as he fades away.
She uses a "Reptilianne" Deck featuring cards to either seal her opponent's draw phase or remove all her opponent's monster attack power, and her ace monster is Dragon Queen of Tragic Endings. Like Carly, she is never seen with any Dark Synchro monsters. She also appears to be able to use lizards as surveillance, much like Roman's spiders.
Grady / Dick Pit (ディック・ピット, Dikko Pitto)
Voiced by: Yoshimasa Hosoya (Japanese); Gary Mack (English)
Grady is a street duelist, who was possessed by one of Roman's spiders and became a Shadow Drone. He challenges Yusei to a Shadow Duel, using an ice-themed deck, and a Dark Synchro monster called Frozen Fitzgerald. When he is defeated by Yusei, he returns to normal, and does not remember what just happened. Grady is unnamed in the English Dub.

=== Yliaster ===
Originally led by Goodwin, Yliaster (イリアステル, Iriasuteru; also Iliaster) was an organization of Star Guardians, who are said to bring peace to the world and worship the Crimson Dragon. Their true purpose, however, is to steer the world to change the future, which was destroyed by Dr Fudo's creation of Ener-D (Momentum in Japanese). In the third season, the founding Yliaster members come from the future with the purpose of setting things right. They hope to accomplish this by harnessing energy from Turbo Duels during the WRGP to power the Ark Cradle, which will be used to destroy Ener-D, and ultimately New Domino City and Satellite, and thus undo the calamity Ener-D had caused.

Z-One (ゾーン, Zōn)
Voiced by: Hideo Ishikawa (Japanese); Marc Thompson (English)
Z-One (pronounced "zone") is the leader of Yliaster, who is a mysterious figure that Three Emperors of Yliaster revere. He is the one who gave them life, and he also gave them the Meklord Emperors. However, Z-ONE gave Yusei Shooting Star Dragon, and created Antinomy to make all possibilities equal for both sides. Along with Aporia, Paradox and Antinomy, Z-One was one of the four last remaining survivors of a future destroyed by a Meklord invasion and a global Ener-D explosion. When Aporia, Paradox and Antinomy died of old age, Z-One revived them as cyborgs in order to help him rewrite the future, which involves the destruction of New Domino City. As Z-One battles against Yusei, he is shown to have the face of an older Yusei. When the Meklord invasion began, Z-One performed an operation on himself to gain the appearance and abilities of Yusei, so he could help as many people as possible. Z-One fell into despair when he wasn't able to. Thus, he believes the only way to save the world is to destroy New Domino City in the past. However, after losing to Yusei and getting a change of heart, Z-One sacrifices himself to stop the Ark Cradle from destroying the city. Z-One uses a Timelord Deck, made up of giant cards formed from stone tablets and handled with giant mechanical arms. These cards specialize in burn damage. He also has Trap cards that can be activated from his hand. His main cards are his ten Timelord Monsters that can only stay on the field for one turn, but have devastating effects. His ace monster, Sephylon, the Ultimate Timelord, can remain on the field indefinitely, raises the attack points of other Timelords to 4,000, and gains attack points equal to the total attack points of other Timelords on the field.
Aporia (アポリア)
Voiced by: Takayuki Sugō (old), Masakazu Nemoto (young adult), Hitomi Yoshida (child) (Japanese); Jamal Najum Khan (English)
Aporia is an android from the future, one of the last remaining humans after the Ener-D explosion. On the verge of death, Aporia allowed Z-One to split him into three incarnations, in order to go back into past and alter it. The three incarnations, known as the Three Emperors of Yliaster, are also known as the three tragedies of Aporia's lifetime, because they are the embodiment of integral moments of his despair. During the end of the WRGP, the Three Emperors combined back into Aporia, who appears in the peak of his life. Aporia duels against Yusei and loses, with his body being damaged as a result. He is repaired by Z-One and duels Jack, Leo and Luna in order to protect the Ark Cradle. He is defeated by them, and they show him that hope is stronger than despair. As a result, Aporia becomes filled with hope and decides to face Z-One in a duel. Aporia loses and is destroyed as a result. His Turbo Deck is a composite of the Emperors' Meklord Emperor decks, which have the ability to absorb Synchro Monsters, along with the strongest Meklord Emperor, Meklord Astro Mekanikle. His Standing Deck focuses on effect damage, and features Meklord Armies, and his key monster, Meklord Astro Dragon Asterisk.
Jakob / José (ホセ, Hose)
Voiced by: Takayuki Sugō (Japanese); Matt Hoverman (English)
Jakob is the de facto leader of the Three Emperors of Yliaster. He is the incarnation of Aporia's later years, and his despair of being one of the last four living humans in his time. His ace monster is Meklord Emperor Granel, which can use the power of the Synchro Monsters it absorbs.
Lester / Luciano (ルチアーノ, Ruchiāno)
Voiced by: Hitomi Yoshida (Japanese); Tom Wayland (English)
The youngest in the group, Lester has the ability to shape-shift, and appears initially in the series as a teen with long red hair tied in a single braid. He has a rather sadistic personality. He is particularly skillful at creating illusions. It is later revealed he is the incarnation of Aporia's preteen years, and his despair of becoming an orphan. Lester's ace monster is Meklord Emperor Skiel. He transfers into Duel Academy in order to get close to Luna, and ends up dueling both her and Leo. After the duel, Lester wipes the memories of the Duel Academy students so they behave like he doesn't exist. He is also the first character in the series to use a Duel Board.
Primo / Placido (プラシド, Purashido)
Voiced by: Masakazu Nemoto (Japanese); Jason Griffith (English)
Primo is the incarnation of Aporia's late teenage years, and his despair of losing his girlfriend. His ace monster is Meklord Emperor Wisel. He has dark-gray hair and the ability to control machines. He carries a sword that can be used to open portals, or can be used as a futuristic duel disk. He has Lazar steal a Duel Runner program from Yusei, and install it into a large number of Duel Bots. He eventually uses these Duel Bots to force Turbo Duelists to crash, in order to speed up a process that Yliaster was planning. Primo is eventually defeated by Yusei and is critically damaged, but Z-One repairs him.
Antinomy (アンチノミー, Anchinomī)
Voiced by: Hiroki Tanaka (Japanese); Justin Badger (English)
Antinomy, born Johnny (ジョニー, Jonī), is a technical genius. He was present the day Ener-D overloaded and he was saved by Z-One, who later converted Antinomy into a cyborg. He was tasked to protect Yusei and teach him Accel Synchro so Yusei's power can revive Ark Cradle, with some of his memory being erased in order to better earn Yusei's trust. He is first introduced only as Vizor (Dark Glass) in his adult form, who informs Yusei about Accel Synchro prior to crashing during a duel with Primo. He is found by Sector Security in his teenage form. Going by the name Bruno (ブルーノ, Burūno), he is sent to live with Yusei, where his abilities as a super mechanic are shown when he improves the gang's Duel Runners. Later, when he comes across a kitten that caused him to crash, he regains his memory as Vizor, and finishes teaching Yusei about Accel Synchro. When he accompanies Yusei to the Ark Cradle, he regains his full memory as Antinomy, and challenges Yusei to a Turbo duel. Antinomy loses the duel and is engulfed in the Divine Temple's artificial sun. Complementing his technique is his T.G. (Tech Genus) Deck, which is designed to frequently summon monsters. These monsters are used for multiple Synchro Summons in order to summon his Accel Synchro Monster, T.G. Blade Blaster. He is also able to perform a more advanced technique called Delta Accel Synchro (which uses three Synchro Monsters) to summon his ace monster, T.G. Halberd Cannon.
Paradox (パラドックス, Paradokkusu)
Voiced by: Atsushi Tamura (Japanese); Sean Schemmel (English)
Paradox is a turbo duelist, who travels across space and time, and he is one of the last survivors, along with Z-One, Aporia and Antinomy. He appears in Yu-Gi-Oh! 3D: Bonds Beyond Time as the main antagonist, trying to destroy the history of Duel Monsters in order to save the future. However, he ends up causing more damage to the timeline than expected. He attempts this by stealing monsters across time, including Yusei's Stardust Dragon, and converting them into powerful Malefic ("Sin" in the original) monsters, so that he can kill the creator of Duel Monsters, Maximillion Pegasus. However, Yusei, along with Yugi Muto and Jaden Yuki, defeat him in a three-on-one duel, thereby reversing all the damage Paradox caused to the timeline. Following his defeat, Paradox disappears into the recesses of time, never to be seen ever again, but not before he ponders all of the events he caused, and if his intervention was worthwhile. Paradox uses a Malefic deck made up of Malefic counterparts of monsters that he steals throughout time, including Malefic Cyber End Dragon, Malefic Rainbow Dragon, Malefic Stardust Dragon, Malefic Blue-Eyes White Dragon, Malefic Red-Eyes Black Dragon, his own monster, Malefic Paradox Dragon, and his ace monster, Malefic Truth Dragon, which he can fuse with.
Clark Smith (クラーク・スミス, Kurāku Sumisu)
Voiced by: Manabu Sakamaki
Clark is the director of the Ener-D Express Development Agency, the company that helped send the Three Emperors to New Domino City. He was placed in charge of a project called Infinity, which can create wormholes. He is responsible for the death of Sherry's parents, who reportedly knew too much about Yliaster. However, when he went against Yliaster's wishes to eliminate Yusei, Clark is erased from existence by the Three Emperors. Clark uses a geometric deck.
Fake Jack Atlas (偽者ジャック・アトラス, Nise Jakku Atorasu)
Voiced by: Takanori Hoshino (Japanese); Ted Lewis (English)
Fake Jack Atlas is a robotic imposter that frames Jack for forcing people to crash during duels. He rides a Duel Runner similar to Jack's Phoenix Whirlwind and uses a deck identical to his, with three copies of Red Dragon Archfiend (that for some reason are purple, yellow and blue instead of red, but none of the characters seem to realize this fact). His personality and tactics, however, are more representative of Jack's prior to his defeat at the hands of Yusei, at the end of the Fortune Cup. He uses brute force to overpower his opponents. When Jack defeats him using Majestic Red Dragon, he is revealed to be a Duel Bot, like Ghost.
Guard Robot (ガードロボ, Gādo Robo)
Voiced by: Suzune Okabe (Japanese); Dan Green (English)
Guard Robot is a giant duel robot that uses an advanced program to predict its opponent's moves, and uses a Lock Down deck designed to seal off various methods of dueling.
Ghost (ゴースト, Gōsuto)
Voiced by: Masahito Kawanago (Japanese); Jason Griffith (English)
Ghosts are Duel Bots, robots originally designed for testing Duel Runners for Sector Security, but which have since been reprogrammed by Primo to force other duelists to crash in Turbo Duels. While the first Ghost was defeated by Yusei, Primo steals a program created by Yusei and Bruno, and installs it into an army of Ghosts (collectively known as the Diablo) that he releases throughout the city.

=== Others ===
Sayer / Divine (ディヴァイン, Divain)
Voiced by: Masaya Matsukaze (Japanese); Marc Thompson (English)
Sayer is a mysterious man who took Akiza under his wing, and was the founder of a group of psychic duelists, known as the Arcadia Movement, that opposes Yliaster, and conjectures that they are planning to use the Crimson Dragon, for world domination. The movement is for uniting Psychic Duelists who have been rejected by the outside world, while Sayer is raising an army of psychic soldiers to get revenge on everyone who mistreated them. He is willing to experiment on children to unleash their full potential. Furthermore, because he has threatened to expose Goodwin, Sayer is able to perform his deeds without being investigated. Sayer is later eliminated by Misty (through her Earthbound Immortal, Ccarayhua), when she learns it was him who was responsible for the death of her brother. Matching his powers, Sayer uses a Deck filled with Psychic Monsters, with his main Synchro Monster being the Thought Ruler Archfiend (Mental Sphere Demon in Japanese).
Zeman the Ape King / Demonic Monkey King Zeman (猿魔王ゼーマン, Enmaō Zēman)
Voiced by: Binbin Takaoka
Zeman is an evil monkey spirit who commands an army of monkey soldiers. He is one of Devack's Dark Synchro monsters, and he can prevent activation of Spell and Trap cards until after the Damage Phase. He and his army use special staffs that imprison Duel Monster Spirits in stone tablets for use as Minus-level monsters. The staffs are also able to reverse the nature of things (e.g. making leaves fall up into trees, making people hear the opposite of what others say). He is destroyed when Regulus neutralizes his negative energy.
Lawton / Lotten (ロットン, Rotten)
Voiced by: Masami Iwasaki (Japanese); Rick Adamson (English)
Lawton is Malcolm's younger brother and the top dog of the Malcolm family, which competes for ownership of a mine in Crash Town. He rides a transformable Duel Runner. His key monster is Gatling Ogre, which has the ability to defeat an opponent before he even takes his turn (by inflicting 4000 LP of damage, even on the first turn of a Duel). He conspires with Barbara to overthrow Malcolm and take over Crash Town.
Familiar of the Crimson Devil (紅蓮の悪魔のしもべ, Guren no Akuma no Shimobe)
Voiced by: Yūki Fujiwara (Japanese)
The Familiar of the Crimson Devil is the fiery servant of Scar-Red Nova, a powerful Earthbound Immortal also known as the Crimson Devil. Not even the Dark Signers could control the Crimson Devil. He tempts Jack into dueling him for a chance to gain power. The true motive is a ritual to revive the Crimson Devil. However, he is defeated when Jack gains a Blazing Soul, and absorbs Scar-Red Nova's power to form Red Nova Dragon. The Familiar uses large stone slabs in place of cards, and his 'deck' focuses on destroying his own monsters to deal effect damage. After his defeat by Jack Atlas, the statue of Scar-Red Nova falls over, crushing and killing the Familiar. This character does not appear in the English dub.

== Duelists ==
Bashford / Tetsuzo Kuzuyama (屑山鉄蔵, Kuzuyama Tetsuzō)
Voiced by: Seizō Katō (Japanese); Wayne Grayson (English)
Bashford is an old man from Satellite. After his wife leaves with his son, Adam/Goki, he becomes attached to his house, which features booby traps and an old-fashioned duel ring. After dueling Crow, he stays at Martha's. Bashford uses a Scrap-Iron deck, which contains a family of Junk monsters and several 'Scrap-Iron' trap cards.
Rudolph Heitmann (ルドルフ・ハイトマン, Rudorufu Haitoman)
Voiced by: Yoshihisa Kawahara (Japanese); Sean Schemmel (English)
Rudolph is the Vice Chancellor of Duel Academy. He dislikes students with low-level monsters. He seems to have inherited the Ancient Gear deck used by Vellian Crowler from Yu-Gi-Oh! GX, which has been updated through the years.
Don Piero / Garome (ガロメ)
Voiced by: Kōzō Shioya (Japanese); David Lapkin (English)
Pierro is a loan shark who swindles people out of their cards. Similar to his job, his deck consists of accountant-esque monsters and specialises on placing Loan Tokens on the opponent's field.

=== Fortune Cup ===
The Fortune Cup is a tournament organized by Rex Goodwin with the purpose of awakening the powers of the Signers. The winner will be able to challenge Jack Atlas for the title of King. Along with Yusei, Aki and Leo (disguised as Luna), there are other duelists whose jobs are to put pressure on their opponents in order to awaken their abilities (the exception is Hunter Pace, who replaced one of the combatants in order to beat Yusei).

Hunter Pace / Mukuro Enjo (炎城 ムクロ, Enjō Mukuro)
Voiced by: Naoki Yanagi (Japanese); Marc Thompson (English)
Hunter is seen in the first episode trying to win Jack's title and losing. In the English language dub he is the former champion trying to reclaim the title he lost to Jack some time before the series began. In the original version however, he is only identified as a challenger and there is no indication that he ever was the champion or had previously dueled Jack. In the eighth episode, he returns with a new deck to duel Jack, but loses again. He returns again to participate in the Fortune Cup by forcibly replacing the cloaked duelist known as "The Reborn Reaper" Shira, and loses to Yusei. He plays a Speed-based deck exclusively for Turbo Duels, focusing on gaining Speed Counters as quickly as possible, as well as effect damage. His Ace Monster is "Skull Flame".
In the manga, Hunter was the second opponent that Yusei Fudo fought in the D1GP. Prior to his duel with Yusei, Hunter went into his garage and stole a part from Yusei's Duel Runner that prevented it from speeding up. This, along with the effects of Hunter's monsters put Yusei at a serious disadvantage in their duel. However Yusei manages to win despite the odds. Hunter uses a Vehicle deck focused around negating attacks.
Gill Randsborg / Jill deLauncebeaux (ジル・ド・ランスボウ, Jiru do Ransubō)
Voiced by: Yōji Ueda (Japanese); Eric Stuart (English)
Gill Randsborg is a duelist in the Fortune Cup tournament who claims to be a descendant of the "knights of old", and he dresses as such. He is first to challenge Aki, using his "Masked Knight"-series "LV" monsters. He barely survives the final blow from Aki's "Black Rose Dragon". In the English version, he speaks mostly in Shakespearean English, but at the end of his duel with Aki, he panics and uses normal English with a Wisconsin accent (as well as confessing that he made his costume especially for this duel).
Professor Frank (フランク博士, Furanku Hakase)
Voiced by: Toshihiko Seki (Japanese); Tom Wayland (English)
Professor Frank is a creepy duelist (and admitted assassin) from China. He battles Luna in a special Consolation Duel, for the losers of the first round of the Fortune Cup tournament. He seems nice and pleasant at first, but he is able to put Luna in a trance that transports her mind to the World of Duel Monster Spirits. He soon follows after to contaminate the world with his evil intentions, revealing himself to not be completely sane. His main monster is Ido, the Supreme Magical Force.
Commander Koda / Kodo Kinomiya (来宮 虎堂, Kinomiya Kodō)
Voiced by: Tarusuke Shingaki (Japanese); Marc Diraison (English)
Koda is a participant in the Fortune Cup who is often called "The Duel Profiler". His opponent in the first round, Professor Frank, threw the match so Frank could play Luna in the Consolation Duel. Koda's opponent in the semifinals was Aki. He studied her past so he could throw her off by reminding her of how her psychic abilities hurt others. Nevertheless, she went on to defeat and severely damage him with her powers.
In the manga, Koda was a contestant in the D1GP. He managed to enter the second stage of the tournament but was defeated by a mysterious being created from a Duel Dragon card.

=== World Racing Grand Prix ===
The following are the competitors in the World Racing Grand Prix (World Riding Duel Grand Prix in Japanese version, WRGP for short) alongside Team 5D's and Yliaster's Team New World. Players battle in teams of up to three players, each with 4000 points per player. When one player's life points reach zero, the next player takes over until all players are eliminated.

Team 5D's (チーム・5D's, Chīmu Faibu Dīzu)
The team consists of Yusei, Jack and Crow. Aki is a reserve rider, and Leo, Luna, and Bruno serve as the pitcrew.
Team New World (チーム・ニューワールド, Chīmu Nyū Wārudo)
The team consists of Jakob, Lester, and Primo. They used their ability to rewrite history so they could replace Sherry's team in the finals.
Team Unicorn
Team Unicorn (チーム・ユニコーン, Chīmu Yunikōn) is one of the leading teams competing in the WRGP. The team competes against Team 5D's in the beginning round of the preliminaries.
Andre (アンドレ, Andore)
Voiced by: Rion Kako (Japanese); Darren Dunstan (English)
Andre is the team's forerunner, generally hailed as a card-playing genius. He uses two decks, a Fast Power deck and a Unicorn deck, both of which rely heavily on special effects. His key card is Thunder Unicorn.
Breo (ブレオ, Bureo)
Voiced by: Yūki Masuda (Japanese); Eli Jay (English)
Breo is the team's second duelist. He used to be a road duelist, but he joined Team Unicorn after being defeated by Jean. He uses a Bicorn deck that revolves around deck destruction.
Jean (ジャン, Jyan)
Voiced by: Ryō Naitō (Japanese); Gary Mack (English)
Jean is the team's leader and third duelist, and he plans out the team's strategies. He was the one who recruited Andre and Breo after noticing their potential as a team. He uses a Tricorn deck.
Team Catastrophe
Team Catastrophe (チーム・カタストロフ, Chīmu Katasutorofu) is another team in the same preliminary group as 5D's and Unicorn. Using a Dark Card called Hook the Hidden Knight that was a gift from Primo, the team can cause the wheels on their opponents' Duel Runners to lock, making them crash. The members are Nicolas, Hermann and Hans. Although they manage to defeat Team Unicorn, they are beaten by Team 5D's when their second dark card - Doom's Ray - backfires.
Nicolas (ニコラス, Nikorasu)
Voiced by: Tsuyoshi Kurosawa (Japanese); Marc Thompson (English)
Hermann (ヘルマン, Heruman)
Voiced by: Kiyoshi Katsunuma (Japanese); Marc D. Donovan (English)
Hans (ハンス, Hanzu)
Voiced by: Yoshiyuki Shimozuma (Japanese); Sean Schemmel (English)
Team Ragnarok
Team Ragnarok (チーム・ラグナロク, Chīmu Ragunaroku) is 5D's opponent in the semi-finals of the WRGP. Similar to the power of the Signers, the team possesses powerful Rune Eyes and three Aesir (Polar God) cards which provide protection from the effects of Yliaster's ability to alter history. These cards seem to resonate when battling against the Signer's dragons. The team's original intention was to beat Team New World and stop Yliaster's plans by themselves, but the team was defeated by 5D's. When Ark Cradle appears in the sky, the team aids the members of 5D's by using their powers to create a bridge to board the floating city.
Halldor / Harald (ハラルド, Hararudo)
Voiced by: Masaya Onosaka (Japanese); Eli Jay (English)
Halldor is Team Ragnarok's leader, he is a former military soldier and he assembled people with the Rune Eyes. He possesses Odin, Father of the Aesir.
Dragan (ドラガン, Doragan)
Voiced by: Ken'ichi Miya (Japanese); David Wills (English)
Dragan possesses Thor, Lord of the Aesir. When his father was crucially injured during an investigation, Dragan was forced by Goodwin to throw a match against Jack, in order to pay for his father's treatment.
Brodor / Brave (ブレイブ, Bureibu)
Voiced by: Ryōhei Kimura (Japanese); Marc Thompson (English)
Brodor is a treasure hunter who possesses Loki, Lord of the Aesir.
Team Sun/ Team Taiyo
Team Sun (チーム・太陽, Chīmu Taiyō) is a team faced by Team 5D's in the quarter finals of the WRGP. The team members share a single Duel Runner that Yusei helps fix prior to the tournament, with which they face Team 5D's. They use a Stall deck which focuses on using Holding Hands Majin to increase their defense for enough turns so they can summon their key monster, the almost unbeatable Sleeping Giant Zushin.
Taro Yamashita (山下太郎, Yamashita Tarō)
Voiced by: Naru Kawamoto
Taro is the team leader of Team Taiyo, and the wheeler in possession of Zushin the Sleeping Giant. He was able to summon it with the combined efforts of Jin and Yoshi.
Jinbei Tanigawa (谷川甚兵衛, Tanigawa Jinbei)
Voiced by: Suguru Inoue
Yoshizo Hayashi (林吉蔵, Hayashi Yoshizō)
Voiced by: Atsushi Kōsaka

=== Other Duelists ===
Lenny / Uryū (瓜生)
Voiced by: Toshiyuki Kusuda (Japanese); Anthony Salerno (English)
Lenny is an insect duelist and former Domino resident who harasses Tank. He later comes with his two henchmen, Larry and Lug, to try to take Yusei's Duel Runner by force. Yusei duels him and wins, and they part on friendly terms, with Lenny promising to win next time they duel. While he and his henchmen are unnamed in the English anime, TV listings and video games refer to him as Lenny.
Mr. Armstrong / Takasu (鷹栖)
Voiced by: Kouji Ishii (Japanese); David Wills (English)
Mr. Armstrong is the warden of the Detention Center that Yusei is held at after his and Jack's duel in the Stadium. Armstrong uses his power as Warden to mistreat and abuse the detainees. After Yusei challenges and defeats Armstrong, winning the freedom of all detainees, Rex Goodwin, who watched the duel from above, fires Armstrong. Armstrong uses a "Chain Deck", focusing on his "Chain" monsters, as well as deck destruction and effect-damage tactics. His Ace Monster is the Synchro Monster "Iron Chain Dragon."
Hayley / Michel (ミシェル, Misheru) and Claire (クレア, Kurea)
Voiced by: Yūko Satō and Maya Yoshioka (Japanese); Tony Salerno and Lisa Ortiz (English)
Hayley is the spirit of a young boy who lived in a house in a forest. Long ago, he and his sister Claire died of an illness, but his strong feelings to protect her kept both of them from passing on. Whenever he sees people who would potentially threaten her, he traps them in cards, which eventually leads to a legend about the forest. He and Claire are set free when he is defeated by Leo. Hayley uses a Ghost deck featuring Circle spell cards that require discards to play spells and monsters.
Syd Barlow (シド, Shido)
Voiced by: Gō Inoue (Japanese); Gary Mack (English)
Syd is the leader of a gang of Duel Runner thieves. He uses a Wheel Deck.
Bolton / Bolger (ボルガー, Borugā)
Voiced by: Suzune Okabe (Japanese); Wayne Grayson (English)
Bolton is a friend of Crow and Robert Pearson, the original owner of Crow's Duel Runner and Deck. While he generally partnered with Pearson to protect the people of Satellite, Bolton was more interested in money. When Pearson refused to enter a businessship deal over his Duel Runner technology, he was killed by Bolton in a duel. Bolton later goes on to form a Duel Runner company, but makes under-the-table deals to keep it afloat. Needing the Black-Winged Dragon card, he duels Crow for it, and his identity as Pearson's murderer is revealed. When Crow defeats him, he finally understands the pain he caused others, and he feels remorse. He uses a White Warrior deck designed to counter the Blackwing deck, and his key card is Crimson Mephist, a monster that can deal real damage in a duel.
Lynden / Leo (レオー, Reo)
Voiced by: Kazuyuki Okitsu (Japanese); Robbie Amell (English)
Lynden is Zora's hyperactive son. Three years ago he accidentally broke Zora's clock, and left home to study clock repair. When he returns, Crow duels him so Lynden can learn to face his problems instead of running away from them. Matching his hobby, Lynden's deck is filled with clock-based monsters, including Clock Knights and a Time Wizard he got from his late father.

== Other characters ==
Blitz (ナーヴ, Nāvu) (Note: The Kanji for Blitz and Nervin's characters were swapped in the 4K Media English website.)
Voiced by: Kensuke Fujita (Japanese); Jamie McGonnigal (English)
Blitz Boylston is a friend of Yusei and an inhabitant of Satellite. He has a strong sense of justice.
Nervin (ブリッツ, Burittsu)
Voiced by: Takahiro Hirano (Japanese); Tom Wayland (English)
Nervin is a friend of Yusei and an inhabitant of Satellite. Nervin is shown with glasses and dreadlock hair, and is described as analytical. He is prone to worrying. For some reason him and Blitz have their names swapped in the dub.
Tank / Taka (タカ)
Voiced by: Tomohiro Oomura (Japanese); David Wills (English)
Tank is a friend of Yusei and an inhabitant of Satellite. He has a jolly personality.
Sly (スライ, Surai)
Voiced by: Sachi Kokuryu (Japanese); Gary Mack (English)
Sly is a student at Duel Academy. He is an anti-social boy, who tends to be by himself. He often gets dragged around by Luna and tries to steal Yusei's Stardust Dragon card.
Bob (ボブ, Bobu)
Voiced by: Kyouko Chihiri (Japanese); Jason Griffith (English)
Bob is a student at Duel Academy. He is friends with Leo and Luna.
Patty (パティ, Pati)
Voiced by: Risa Mizuno (Japanese); Lisa Ortiz (English)
Patty is a student at Duel Academy. She has blonde hair, green eyes and dark skin. She is friends with Luna and Leo.
Maria Bartlet (マリア, Maria)
Voiced by: Risa Mizuno (Japanese); Bella Hudson (English)
Maria Bartlet is a teacher at Duel Academy. She has short red hair and grey eyes.
Zora (ゾラ)
Voiced by: Kiri Yoshizawa (Japanese); Bella Hudson (English)
Zora is a friend of Martha's and the landlady of a house that Yusei, Jack and Crow stay at in the third season. She gets annoyed by the disturbances of the crew's engineering, but she seems to have a soft side for Yusei.
Chancellor (校長先生, Kōchō sensei)
The head of Duel Academy.
Alex / Kōhei Aoyama (青山 光平, Aoyama Kōhei)
Voiced by: Shun Takagi (Japanese); Pete Zarustica (English)
Alex is one of Yusei's cellmates at the detention center. He plans to escape. He gives up his chance for freedom in order to help Yusei win his duel against Mr. Armstrong.
MC
Voiced by: Bernard Ackah (Japanese); Sean Schemmel (English)
MC is the Master of Ceremonies for the Turbo Duels. He provides commentary for both the Fortune Cup and the WRGP. His hair is maintained as a very large pompadour.
Zigzix / Akutsu (阿久津)
Voiced by: Kouichirou Yuzawa (Japanese); Sean Schemmel (English)
Zigzix is the scientist who designed New Domino City's power plant. He studies the Signers' power under Goodwin's orders. In the Japanese version, he also has an obsession with "momentum" and enjoys talking about something that translates as things that "spin" in the English version.
Dexter / Tenpei Hayano (早野 天兵, Hayano Tenpei)
Voiced by: Kokoro Kikuchi (Japanese); Pete Capella (English)
Dexter is a young duelist, who is good friends with Leo and Bob. He builds a dueling deck specifically designed to defeat the powerful duelist known as "The Black Rose", whom he and Leo had been planning to challenge for some time. When he first meets Yusei, Dexter is afraid of him because of his criminal mark, but he begins to admire Yusei once Leo tells him that Yusei had customized Leo and Luna's Duel Disks to fit them and was strong enough to enter the Fortune Cup.
Angela Rains (アンジェラ, Anjera)
Voiced by: Chieko Higuchi (Japanese); Kether Donohue (English)
Angela is a reporter who constantly gets in Carly's way and shows little respect for others, especially Carly. She will often write rather incriminating articles, even if she lacks good evidence. She also has no problem with using her body to get a scoop. This was seen when she crawled out from under Goodwin's desk thanked him for his information.
Senator Izinski / Hideo Izayoi (十六夜 英雄, Izayoi Hideo)
Voiced by: Tetsu Inada (Japanese); Marc Thompson (English)
Hideo (simply known as the Senator in the English dub) is Aki's father. While he loves his daughter very much, his work often gets in the way of spending time with her. During a duel with her when she was eight, a call from work awakened Aki's Signer powers, and her father was hurt in the process. Her parents become more fearful of her, and Hideo blames himself for neglecting Aki. When Aki is hospitalized as a result of her duel with Misty, Hideo goes to visit her and wishes that someone would help her. Jack informs Aki that the one person who can help her is Yusei, so Hideo begs Yusei for his help. With both Hideo and Yusei's assistance, Aki manages to gain control of her powers and open her heart to people once again.
Mrs. Izinski / Setsuko Izayoi (十六夜 節子, Izayoi Setsuko)
Voiced by: Akira Nakagawa (Japanese); Priscilla Everett (English)
Setsuko is Hideo's wife, who bears a resemblance to her daughter, Aki.
Professor Fudo (不動博士, Fudō Hakase)
Voiced by: Daisuke Hosomi (Japanese); Wayne Grayson (English)
Professor Fudo is Yusei's father. He worked for RRD on the Ener-D project with his assistants, Rex and Roman Goodwin. When he decided it would be too dangerous to continue, he tried to stop the project. However, Roman betrayed him and took over the project. The Zero Reverse incident occurred, and Professor Fudo was caught in the blast. Just prior, he entrusted three of the Dragon cards to Goodwin, who put them in circulation until they came to their owners, and made sure his son, Yusei, got to safety. While he is thought to have died, he appears to Yusei in a different dimension.
Toby Tredwell / Tobi Lola (トビ・ローラ, Tobi Rora)
Voiced by: Mayumi Tsuchida (Japanese); Andrew Rannells (English)
Toby Tredwell is Misty's younger brother, who died a year before the series begins. He was one of the members of the Arcadia Movement with Psychic powers similar to Aki's. However, he was killed by Sayer as a result of some harsh experiments on his psychic potential (in the English dub, he is supposedly taken by them). Sayer made it appear that it was Aki's fault he died, so Misty wants revenge on Aki. Sayer's incriminating information on Rex Goodwin helps avoid investigation into the matter. However, the truth is revealed by the efforts of Yusei.
Stephanie (ステファニー, Sutefanī)
Voiced by: Lyrian (Japanese); Sarah Natochenny (English)
Stephanie is a waitress at a café that Jack frequents. She has a crush on him and is often at odds with both Mina and Carly for his affections.
Robert Pearson (ロバート・ピアスン, Robāto Piasun)
Voiced by: Yūki Tai (Japanese); Jason Griffith (English)
Pearson is the original owner of the Blackbird Duel Runner and the Blackwing Deck three years prior to the story. He looked after the kids of Satellite and taught them to build Duel Monster equipment. When he refused to sell his Duel Runner tech to a company, Bolton dueled him with a monster that inflicted real damage, and the duel ended in Pearson's death. Before dying, he entrusted his deck, Duel Runner and the safety of the children to Crow.
Barbara (バーバラ, Bābara)
Voiced by: Akemi Okamura (Japanese); Lisa Ortiz (English)
Barbara is a woman residing in Crash Town, who asks for Yusei's help in rescuing Kalin from the Radley Group. However, it turns out to be a ruse. Barbara is actually working with the Malcolm family, in an attempt to trick Yusei into beating Kalin, because this would leave the Radley group helpless.
Malcolm (マルコム, Marucomu)
Voiced by: Yutaka Aoyama (Japanese); Wayne Grayson (English)
Malcolm is the leader of the Malcolm family. His family is recognizable because of the red scarves they wear.
Radley / Ramon (ラモン, Ramon)
Voiced by: Eiji Miyashita (Japanese); Sam Riegel (English)
Radley is the leader of the Radley group, which generally wears black jackets. He recruits Kalin to his group to fend off the Malcolm group, but is soon defeated himself by Lawton and taken to the mines.
West (ウェスト, Wesuto) and Nico (ニコ, Niko)
Voiced by: Hiromi Igarashi (Japanese); Leo Williams (English) and Voiced by: Akiko Yajima (Japanese); Kether Donohue (English)
West and Nico are siblings whose father was sent to work in the mines. They grow fond of Kalin and help him and Yusei escape from the mines, as well as rescue their father. While escaping with Kalin, their father falls down a mine shaft, and upon exiting the mine, they are kidnapped by Lawton. They are later rescued and are now cared for by Kalin.

== Manga characters ==
Sect Ijuin (伊集院セクト, Ijūin Sekuto)
Sect is a Turbo duelist who looks up to Yusei Fudo like a big brother. However after getting a shadow card from the Skeleton Knight, he believes that Yusei looks down on him for being weak. He uses an Insect deck and has an ant-themed Duel Runner. Later on he gains a new Duel Runner and uses a Hell-themed deck. His ace monster is the Duel Dragon: Beezle of the Diabolic Dragons. It has a stronger form called Beelzeus of the Diabolic Dragons. In the Japanese version Sect has a habit of saying "Ari" (アリ; "ant"). Originally the creators planned to give him an ant-themed deck, but instead they gave him an insect-themed deck. The Duel Runner and the speech in the Japanese version are remnants of the ant theme.
Skeleton Knight (骸骨騎士, Gaikotsu Kishi)
The Skeleton Knight is a skeletal horseman who duels on horseback. He was made out to be an urban legend that people who invoke his powers gain rare cards. However, he is really a dangerous duelist who can deal real damage. The Skeleton Knight uses a Hellfire deck consisting of zombie type monsters. His ace monster is Dragonecro Nethersoul Dragon, a terrifying duel dragon that can create dark copies of any monster it battles. It has a stronger form called Dragocytos Corrupted Nethersoul Dragon.
Dark Crow Hogan (闇クロウ・ホーガン, Yami Kurō Hōgan)
An evil copy of Crow Hogan that appears before him in the D1GP. In order to obtain a Duel Dragon card, Crow must defeat his evil counterpart to gain control of it. He uses the exact same deck as Crow along with the exact same strategies but the only exception is his Duel Dragon card, Blackfeather Darkrage Dragon.
Shinto Priest
A man who lived in the ancient past, he was the original owner of Stardust Spark Dragon. He challenged Yusei Fudo to a Duel called a "One Shot Run" in order to see if he was worthy of possessing the dragon's power.
Ish Kiq Goodwin / Ix Quic Goodwin (イシュ・キック・ゴドウィン, Ishu Kikku Godowin)
A young woman who is a very powerful duel priestess. She adopted Rex and Roman Goodwin and was the one who gave them their names.
Ultimate God (究極神, Kyūkyoku-shin)
A mysterious creature that sleeps within the Aerial Fortress Seibal. It is said that who ever wakes it up will be granted one wish but it has a powerful shadow miasma that make anyone who goes near it insane.

=== D1 Grand Prix ===
Aria
Aria was a contestant in the D1GP. He was defeated by Leo and Luna and as a result was knocked out from the tournament.
Admire Derby (アドマイヤ・ダービー, Adomaiya Dābī)
Admire is a contestant in the D1GP. He is called the Speed Holder. He managed to get the second stage of the tournament after gaining the level 3,5,8, and 9 Star Tickets and was able to advance to the finals.
Taiga Aizu (会津 大河, Aizu Taiga)
Taiga Aizu is a contestant in the D1GP. He is called the Dangerous Beast. Taiga managed to get to the second stage of the tournament but was unable to collect any Star Tickets. When Yusei Fudo was heading to the duel gate, Taiga ambushed him and tried to steal all of his Star Tickets but he was defeated easily by Yusei.
Ramon Kagura (神楽 羅門, Kagura Ramon)
Ramon is a contestant in the D1GP. He is known as the Counterpoint Master of Ice and Flame. Ramon managed to reach the second stage of the D1GP but so far he hasn't won any Star Tickets.
Adolf Müller (アドルフ・ミューラー, Adorufu Myūrā)
Adolf is a contestant in the D1GP. He is called the Masked Nobel. Adolf managed to reach the second stage of the tournament and he obtained the level 3 Star Ticket.

=== Others ===
Yoshi Hogan (ヨシ・ホーガン, Yoshi Hōgan)
Yoshi is Crow's younger brother. He had to go get a serious operation but was afraid to do so. Crow makes a promise with Yoshi to enter and win the D1GP in hopes that it will give him the courage to go through with the operation.
Ran Kobayakawa (小早川 ラン, Kobayakawa Ran)
Ran is a student at Queen's Duel Academy. She dueled Aki for her title of "Queen of Queens" but she lost to her. When Aki enters the D1GP, Ran along with the other students of the academy cheer her on.

== Video Game Characters ==
Surtr (スルト, Suruto)
Surtr is the antagonist of Yu-Gi-Oh! 5D's Duel Transer. He is named after Surtr from Norse mythology. He intends to take over the island of Ragnarok, where a duel tournament is taking place.
Odin (オーディン, Ōdin)
Odin is the true main antagonist of Yu-Gi-Oh! 5D's Duel Transer. He is named after Odin from Norse mythology. He is a mysterious character that hides his identity underneath a suit of armor.
Misaki (ミサキ)
A mysterious girl who appears in Yu-Gi-Oh! 5D's World Championship 2011: Over The Nexus. She joins the Player and Toru to form their own dueling team called Team Future Speed to enter the WRGP. Similar to Bruno, Misaki is capable of transforming into her own "Vizor" form and aids the player whom she extremely fall in love with.
Toru (トオル, Tōru)
A young man who is best friends with the main character. He appears in Yu-Gi-Oh! 5D's World Championship 2011: Over the Nexus. Toru along with the player dreams of going to New Domino City to enter the WRGP and win the championship.
