= Yuya Miyashita =

Japanese singer, actor, and voice actor (born 1985)

- 宮下 雄也
- Born: September 3, 1985 (age 41); Osaka Prefecture, Japan
- Occupations: Singer; actor; voice actor
- Years active: 2000-present
- Agent: Yoshimoto Kogyo
- Notable credit: Yu-Gi-Oh! 5D's as Yusei Fudo
- Height: 174 cm (5 ft 9 in)
- Musical career
- Genre: J-pop
- Instruments: Vocals; drums
- Label: R & C, Ltd.
- Website: Official profile

Yuya Miyashita (宮下 雄也, Miyashita Yūya; born September 3, 1985) is a Japanese musician and actor. In 2001, he debuted as a member of the boy band Run&Gun. In 2012, he became the drummer of the band 4 Strike.

As an actor, Miyashita has appeared in the stage productions of Air Gear and Danganronpa. In 2008, he also provided to the voice to Yusei Fudo from Yu-Gi-Oh! 5D's.

== Career ==
In 2001, Miyashita appeared on the audition program Study Park!!, where he was selected as one of the members for the boy band Run&Gun, later debuting on July 4, 2001, with the single "Lay-Up!" During his time with the group, in 2005, Miyashita also released a solo song titled "Yuya no Seishun Densetsu" for Run&Gun's first extended play, Hateshinai Tabi no Naka de...

In 2012, Miyashita became the drummer of the rock band 4 Strike with several actors from Musical: The Prince of Tennis.

== Filmography ==
=== Movie ===
- Route 58 (2003), Yuki Oshiro
- Yu-Gi-Oh!: Bonds Beyond Time (2010), Yusei Fudo
- Karate-Robo Zaborgar (2011), Gen Akizuki

=== Television ===
Year	Title	Role	Network	Note
2008	Yu-Gi-Oh! 5D's	Yusei Fudo	TV Tokyo	Lead role; voice in anime

=== Theater ===
- Musical Air Gear (Puck) (2007/01, Tokyo + Osaka)
- Musical Air Gear vs. Bacchus Super Range Remix (Puck) (2007/05, Tokyo)
- RUN&GUN stage: Blue sheets (Kenta) (2008/01, Tokyo + Osaka)
- Pippin (Louis) (2008)
- RUN&GUN stage 2: Yoosoro (2008/10)
- Boukensha-Tachi as ガクシャ
- Kuroshitsuji Musical as Kirito
- Persona 5: The Stage #2 as Junya Kaneshiro
