= ROM-4 =

Japanese pop group

- Origin: Tokyo, Japan
- Genres: Rap, J-pop
- Instruments: Singing; Rapping
- Years active: 2006
- Label: SonyMEJ
- Members: Masaki Kaji; Masataka Kubota; Ryo Kimura; Gouta Watabe
- Website: ROM-4 Official Website

ROM-4 is a four-member J-pop group that consists of Masaki Kaji, Masataka Kubota, Ryo Kimura, and Gouta Watabe.

== History ==
The rap group "ROM-4" was formed for the Japanese television drama, Seishun Energy: Check It Out, Yo! in Tokyo (青春★ENERGY ~ チェケラッチョ!! In Tokyo), that aired on Fuji TV from April 12, 2006 to June 15, 2006.

The show's about 4 third year high school students of present Tokyo that are not motivated, but when they encounter rap, it helps motivate them to take charge of their lives and their dreams. Thus the song "Keep It Goin' On" represents their motivation, spirit and seishun (young) energy.

In the drama, Takumi (played by Masataka Kubota), Satoru (played by Gouta Watabe), Shingo (played by Masaki Kaji) and Sanpei (played by Ryo Kimura) form the group ROM-4.

The name, ROM-4, is an abbreviation for Rapで、俺(O)達、モ(M)テタイ、Yo(4)！」の略, which means "through Rap R, Oretachi ('we') O, Motetai ('want to be hot') M, Yo (from 'yon' which is Japanese for '4') 4. Therefore, a literal translation of ROM-4, would mean "We want to be hot and rap, yo!"

ROM-4 made their CD debut on June 21, 2006, when they released their CD single called "Keep It Goin' ON" for the show. On November 13, 2006, the single sold 465 copies in Japan and its highest ranking on Oricon was 174, appearing on the chart once.

== Discography ==
=== Singles stats ===
Single was released for the Seishun Energy: Check It Out, Yo! in Tokyo TV show in Japan (JPN), only.

Year	Cover	Title	Album	Chart positions
Year	Cover	Title	Album	JPN
2006		"Keep It Goin' On"	Keep It Going ON: Release date: June 21, 2006; 1st CD single; Formats: CD	174

=== Track listings ===
Track Listings for the Keep It Goin' On CD single:

1. "Keep It Goin' On"
2. "Keep It Goin' On (SUNSHINE REMIX)"
3. "Keep It Goin' On ～Instrumental～"

== See also ==
- Masaki Kaji
