= Kosuke Yonehara =

- 米原 幸佑
- Born: March 13, 1986 (age 40); Osaka, Japan
- Occupations: Singer; actor; drummer
- Musical career
- Genres: J-pop
- Instruments: Drums; guitar
- Years active: 2001–present
- Label: Yoshimoto Kogyo
- Formerly of: Run&Gun; Cocoa Otoko; Yosuke Kosuke

Kosuke Yonehara (米原 幸佑, Yonehara Kōsuke; born March 13, 1986) is a Japanese musician and actor affiliated with Yoshimoto Kogyo. Yonehara debuted in 2001 as a member of the boy band and acting troupe Run&Gun. From 2010 to 2012, he was also the drummer of the band Cocoa Otoko. Later, he provided vocals and guitar to the musical duo Yosuke Kosuke with Yosuke Sakanoue.

As an actor, Yonehara has appeared in stage productions such as Air Gear, Fruits Basket, and Peacemaker Kurogane. He also starred in the film No Touching At All.

== Career ==
Yonehara was a former trainee at Johnny & Associates as a Kansai Johnny's Jr., but he left and joined D.A.N.K. (Daisuke Asakura New Kids) in 2000, a performance troupe produced by Daisuke Asakura. In 2001, he appeared on the audition program Study Park!!, where he was selected as one of the members for the boy band Run&Gun, later debuting on July 4, 2001 with the single "Lay-Up!" During his time with the group, in 2005, Yonehara also released a solo song titled "Memories" for Run&Gun's first extended play, Hateshinai Tabi no Naka de...

As an actor, Yonehara appeared in the stage adaptation of Air Gear as Hamlet, but in the second installment he took over the role of Romeo from Ryuji Kamiyama after he had replaced Kenta Kamakari (who had fallen ill) as Minami Itsuki. He also played the female role of Rosemary in several Maria Magdalena stages. Between April 2010 and March 2012, he was the drummer of the rock group Cocoa Otoko.

== Filmography ==
=== Television ===
- Suiyō Premier (2004, TBS)
- Busu no Hitomi ni Koishiteru (2006, Fuji TV) as Kōsuke Yoshida
- Helen to Kiyoshi no Monogatari (2006, Nippon TV) as Tanaka
- Yama Onna Kabe Onna (2007, Fuji TV) as Gōro Morita
- Heaven's Rock (2010, Kansai TV) as Yūsaku
- Yamikin Ushijima-kun (2010, Mainichi Hōsō) as Suguru
- Minami no Teiō (2013, Kansai TV) as Hasegawa
- Suiyō Mystery 9 (2013–14, TV Tokyo) as Taku Kaji
- BL Mangaka desu, Kedo Kekkon Shite mo Idesu ka? (2017, Fuji TV)
- Club Slazy Extra invitation: Malachite (2017–18, Tokyo MX)
- Saigo no Ban Gohan (2018, BS TV Tokyo) as Riei Satonaka

=== Film ===
- Route58 (2003) as Takashi Chinen
- Yoshimoto Director's 100: 100-Ri ga Eiga Torimashita (2007)
- Zenzen Daijōbu (2008)
- Detroit Metal City (2008)
- Wangan Midnight (2009) as Masaki Takahashi
- The Hero Show (2010) as Tsutomu Kagawa
- Nobō no Shiro (2012) as Gonhei
- R-18 Bungaku-shō vol. 1 Jijōjibaku no Watashi (2013) as Tatsuya Sakurai
- No Touching At All (2014) as Toshiaki Shima
- Gachiban Series: New Generatin (2015)
- Jinrō Shokei Game (2015) as Yūichi Niina
- Killing Curriculum: Jinrō Shokei Game - Prologue (2015) as Yūichi Niina

=== Stage ===
- Act of Date (2004)
- Prisoner#5 (2004)
- Run&Gun -restructuring- theater odyssey 05-06 The Entertainment for Adult (2005)
- Osaka Heaven (2006)
- Air Gear (2007) as Hamlet
- Musical Air Gear vs. Bacchus Super Range Remix (2007) as Romeo
- Run&Gun Stage: Blue Sheets (2008) as Masaru
- Run&Gun Stage: Yoosoro (2008) as Daisaku
- Maria Magdalena ~Lady Maria's Mad (Apple) Tea Party~ (2008) as Rosemary
- Dust (2009)
- Fruits Basket (2009) as Kagura Souma
- Peacemaker Kurogane (2009)
- Fake Heart (2009)
- My sweetheart is invisible (2009)
- Thanks! Grasshopper (2009)
- Run&Gun Stage: How many times can we save the world? (2010)
- Musical Air Gear vs. Bacchus Top Gear Remix (2010) as Hamlet
- Maria Magdalena ~Lady Maria's Dream is to open at night! House Magdara finally opened (2010) as Rosemary
- The Run&Gun Horror Show "Bacchus' Banquet (2011)
- Maria Magdalena ~Lady Maria's Mad (Apple) Tea Party (Reprise!)~ (2011) as Rosemary
- Men-tertainment (2011)
- Maria Magdalena ~House Magdara and much ado about nothing~ (2011) as Rosemary
- Bacchus' Holy Night (2011)
- Action Vol.3 (2012)
- The Little Mermaid (2012)
- Men-tertainment 2012 Special Live (2012)
- Maria Magdalena Magdara Live! (2012, SHIBUYA-AX) as Rosemary
- People who dose not fit is floating (2012)
- Mash Up! vol.3 (2012)
- Corpus Christi (2012)
- Partner of Tail (2012)
- Tropical Boy (2012)
- BOYing!! (2012)
- BOYS★TALK (2013, Space Zero) as Sou
- Maria Magdalena (2013, Shibuya-Ax)
- Santa Claus Con-Game"~Side Story of Butas' Big Adventure~ (2013, Ikebukuro OwlSpotO)
- Club Slazy (2013, Shinjuku FACE) como Coolbeans
- Club Slazy The 2nd invitation ~Sapphire~ (2013, Space Zero) as Coolbeans
- Dawn Romantic" (2013, Kichijoji Theater)
- Luv Slazy (2014)
- Mom and us ~Babys don't want to study~ (2014, AiiA Theater Tokyo)
- Comic Potential (2014, Akasaka Red Theater)
- The Kaidan A thousand feet up the Alps Final (2014, Theater Sun Mall)
- Club Slazy The 3rd invitation ~Onyx~ (2014, Sogetsu Hall) as Coolbeans
- Aka to kuro (2014, Ichijoji Theater)
- The Little Mermaid (2014, Sotetsu Honda Gekijo) as Depushi
- Boys★Talk (2014, Shinjuku Face)
- Vivid Contact -The just- (2015, Nakano The Pocket)
- Rainbow of Agartha (2015, Nakano Kinkero Theater)
- Mom and us ~Babys don't want to study~ (2015, AiiA Theater Tokyo)
- Handsome Rakugo 5th (2015, Tokyo CBGK!!)
- Tama and Friends (2015, Space Zero)
- I will tell you the reason of why man cry "4649" (2015, Theatre Bonbon)
- Takiguchi Flaming (2015, Meijiza)
- Handsome Rakugo 6th (2015, Tokyo CBGK!!)
- Tanabata Junction (2015, Hakuhinkan) as Tsutaya Jyusaburou
- WATARoom Summer Festival (2015, Nakano Theater Bonbon)
- Flower of Agartha (2015, Theater Haiyuza)
- Hell Screen (2015)
- Jinrou TLPT x Psycho-Pass: Innocent Murderer (2015, Theater Sun Mall)
- New Interpretation of Sanada Ten Braves (2015, Space Zero)
- Club Slazy The 4th invitation ~Topaz~ (2015) as Coolbeans
- Vivid Contact -re:born- (2016, Nakano The Pocket)
- Show By Rock!! Musical (2016, Zepp Blue Theater Roppongi)
- Kanata Next" (2016, Last Waltz)
- I Am a Cat (2016, Theater Nihonbasi)
- Cherry Boys (2016, Hakuhinkan)
- Devils and Realist (2016, Space Zero) as Camio
- Public∴Garden! "Hush By" (2016)
- Tanabata Junction ~Syowa ~ A Game and a gentail lie (2016, Hakuhinkan) as Tsutaya Jyusaburou
- King Lear (2016) as Fool / Cordelia

== Publications ==
- Flying Mellon (2007) Co-author: Ryuji Kamiyama
- Team! Danshi o Katarou Asamade! (2008), Ohta Publishing
- Hataraku Men's Shashin-shū Work-ish (2008), Gentosha
- Konya Uokka ga Shitataru Nikutai (2009), Kodansha
- Heaven's Rock (2010), Gakken Plus
