= Yosuke Kosuke =

Japanese band

Yosuke Kosuke ヨースケコースケ
- Origin: Japan
- Genres: J-pop
- Years active: 2015-present
- Labels: Destiny Label; Vivid Sound Corporation; YK Record
- Past members: Yosuke Sakanoue; Kosuke Yonehara

Yosuke Kosuke (ヨースケコースケ) is a Japanese band consisting of Yosuke Sakanoue and Kosuke Yonehara.

== Discography ==
=== Studio albums ===
Title	Year	Details	Peak chart positions	Sales
Title	Year	Details	JPN	Sales
It's My World	2015	Released: January 28, 2015; Label: Destiny Label; Format: CD	171	—
Super Original (スーパーオリジナル)	2016	Released: March 16, 2016; Label: Vivid Sound Corporation; Format: CD	136	—
Yosuke Kosuke Acoustic Selection	2017	Released: November 15, 2017; Label: YK Record; Format: CD	—	—
Albireo (アルビレオ)	2018	Released: May 2, 2018; Label: YK Record; Format: CD	112	—
"—" denotes releases that did not chart or were not released in that region.

=== Singles ===
Title	Year	Peak chart positions	Sales	Album
Title	Year	JPN	Sales	Album
"Oort no Kumo EP" (オールトの雲.ep)	2015	90	—	Super Original
"Chō Ii ze!" (超イイぜっ!)	2016	67	—	Super Original
"Sōkai Summer" (爽快サマー)	2016	129	—	Super Original
"Zensokuryoku" (全速力)	2016	135	—	Super Original
"—" denotes releases that did not chart or were not released in that region.
