= Jinrō Shokei Game =

2015 film by Guillaume Tauveron

- Directed by: Guillaume Tauveron
- Screenplay by: Masakazu Hamada
- Based on: The Werewolves of Millers Hollow
- Produced by: Mayuko Hayashi; Kei Shōji; Shin'ichi Shimano
- Starring: Motohiro Ōta; Kōsuke Yonehara; Masanari Wada; Kozue Aikawa; Yū Chidai; Jun'nosuke Mura; Beniko; Keiko Morikawa; Hiromi Sakimoto
- Cinematography: Mitsuhiro Fujiwara
- Music by: Jérémy Tridera
- Production company: Brilliant Star Films Artist
- Distributed by: Brilliant Star Films Artist
- Release date: 9 March 2015 (Japan)
- Running time: 78 minutes
- Country: Japan
- Language: Japanese

Jinrō Shokei Game: Tatoe Kimi ga Okami, Demo Boku wa Kimi wo Mamoru (人狼処刑ゲーム ～たとえ君が狼でも僕は君を守る～, lit. Even if you are a werewolf, I will protect you), better known simply as Jinrō Shokei Game, is a 2015 Japanese film directed by Guillaume Tauveron. The film stars Motohiro Ōta as Taiga and Kōsuke Yonehara as Yūichi Niina. It is based on the popular card game The Werewolves of Millers Hollow, and incorporates psychological, horror based in Saw and Boys' Love themes.

== Plot ==
Taiga Kishimoto (Motohiro Ōta) is a high school student who is abducted on his way home and wakes up in an unknown place. There he reunites with Niina (Kōsuke Yonehara), a childhood friend with whom he also had a romantic relationship, although they distanced in later years after Niina changed schools. Both boys discover that they are confined in a school with old classmates and a teacher, where they are soon informed that they will be forced to participate in a deadly and sadistic game called "The Werewolf Game" (Jinrō Game).

Each person is assigned a role that they must keep hidden from others, these being the roles of villagers and two werewolves. The rules are simple: the team who manages to eliminate all the participants of the other team will win. However, there can only be one winner and all those who are eliminated by unanimous vote, accused of being werewolves, will die, as well as the participants who are attacked by the werewolves at night. As if this were not enough, the group discovers that a microchip has been placed in their brains that will activate if they try to escape, which will kill them by releasing a lethal substance. In the same way, the microchip also causes the participants who carry the role of werewolf to attack the villagers at midnight, making them lose all sense of humanity, like a beast.

In the middle of this situation of life or death, Taiga and Niina reaffirm their feelings for each other and end up being the last two participants alive. Taiga, knowing that Niina is one of the werewolves, urges Niina to kill him so he can save himself. Niina, however, has lost the will to live long ago and even reveals to Taiga that he tried to commit suicide in the past, so he should be the one to die in punishment for having wished death. When midnight arrives, Niina begins to undergo the transformation and sacrifices himself for Taiga biting himself. The film ends with Taiga promising Niina's body that he will live every day of his life as if it were the last, never wishing for death.

== Cast ==
- Motohiro Ōta as Taiga Kishimoto
- Kōsuke Yonehara as Yūichi Niina
- Masanari Wada as Motoharu Yuge
- Kozue Aikawa as Suzu Nakamura
- Yū Chidai as Toru Takagi
- Jun'nosuke Mura as Miyake
- Beniko as Eri Nohara
- Keiko Morikawa as Muraoka-sensei
- Hiromi Sakimoto as Sora Ryūn

== Production ==
The film was directed by French director Guillaume Tauveron and is composed mostly of rookie actors, with the exception of Motohiro Ōta, Kōsuke Yonehara, Masanari Wada and Hiromi Sakimoto, who had already worked on previous projects before. A DVD/Blu-ray edition was released on March 16, 2015. A prequel, Killing Curriculum: Jinroh Shokei Game - Prologue, was released a few months later, on August 9, 2015. The new film was directed by Tomoyuki Furumaya and focuses on Niina's character.
