= List of Kamisama Minarai: Himitsu no Cocotama characters =

This is the list of characters appearing in the anime Kamisama Minarai: Himitsu no Cocotama.

== Main characters ==
Kokoro Yotsuba (四葉 こころ, Yotsuba Kokoro)
Voiced by: Kaede Hondo

The main protagonist of this work. Kokoro is a fifth-grader who encounters a small god born from her treasured colored pencil set. She then a contract with LuckyTama, her partner Cocotama, and made a wish that she would be less clumsy. She is bright and tries to make friends with anyone in her age, and sometimes take proactive action without thinking too much about the concequences. She is also kind, and is not very angry, even when the Cocotama is causing trouble.

Nozomi Sakurai (桜井 のぞみ, Sakurai Nozomi)
Voiced by: Kaori Ishihara

The second main character of this work. Nozomi is a fifth-grader who made a contract with Vivit, and made a wish that she would grow up quickly. She had already met Kokoro before transferring to another school, and then attends the same school she does. She is serious and reliable, and is tall and acts like an older sister to the other girls in her age. As a Happy Hunter, she makes it her daily routine to help someone solve their problems at least once.

Hikari Chono (蝶野 ひかり, Chōno Hikari)
Voiced by: Hibiku Yamamura

The third main character of this work. Hikari is a fifth-grader who attends at another school. She is good at magic, and dreams to become a magician in the future. She is cheerful and is full of curiosity. She laughs in a cheerful "nihihi" manner.

== Cocotamas ==
The Cocotamas (ここたま, Kokotama) are small animal-like gods born from the items that the people treasure, and can cast spells by saying "Cocon Poipoi Cocottama!" (ここんぽいぽいここったま!, Kokon Poipoi Kokottama!). They have soft, plump bodies, and wear eggshell underpants. Their gender can determine the shape of their eggshell underpants; the males have jagged-shaped underpants, while the females have curved-shaped underpants. Once a Cocotama becomes fully-fledged, he/she will be sent to the Cocotama World, and can watch over the humans. If a Cocotama reveals a secret to anyone other than the contractor, the contact is invalid, he/she will return to the item they were born, and the contractor will lose all of his/her memories from them.

"Cocotama" is derived from the Japanese words "kokoro", and "tamashii". The concept of the characters is based on the tsukumogami with elements from ninjas and Kuroko and real or mythological animals.

=== Cocotamas Contracted to Kokoro ===
Luckytama (ラキたま, Rakitama)
Voiced by: Megumi Han

The main hero of this work. LuckyTama is an orange hamster-like Cocotama born from Kokoro's treasured colored pencils when she was 3, and is referred to as "The Colored Pencil God". His full name is "Lucky Lucky Tamakoronosuke-no-Mikoto" (ラキラキのたまころの助のみこと, Rakiraki no Tamakoronosuke no Mikoto) and the mark on his eggshell underpants is a pastel green four-leaf clover. He is a curious and playful boy who says his catchphrase "Lucky!", and likes to draw pictures.

Melory (メロリー, Merorī)
Voiced by: Aki Toyosaki

The secondary heroine of this work. Melory is a pink poodle-like Cocotama born from the piano that Kokoro played when she was 3, and is referred to as "The Piano God". Her full name is "Mellow Melorin Princess-no-Mikoto" (メロメロリン姫のみこと, Meromerorin-hime no Mikoto) and the mark on her eggshell underpants is a magenta heart. She is bright and naive, and can sing songs. However, she hates songs that Oshaki sings and makes funny faces when hearing theme.

Oshaki (おシャキ, Oshaki)
Voiced by: Yumi Kakazu

Oshaki is a light blue chipmunk-like Cocotama born from an encyclopedia that Kokoro's father, Koichi owns in his room, and is referred to as "The Book God". Her full name is "Shaki-Shaki Talkable Master-no-Mikoto (シャキシャキしゃべり主のみこと, Shakishaki Shaberi-nushi no Mikoto) and the mark on her eggshell underpants is a yellow lightbulb. She is very polite and graceful. She is serious, meticulous, and very knowledgeable. She is strict about rules, and scolds other Cocotamas when they go too far, so she is basically a person with common sense.

Geracho (ゲラチョ, Geratcho)
Voiced by: Rikako Aikawa

Geracho is a green lizard-like Cocotama born from a television, and is referred to as "The TV God". His full name is "Gera-Gera no Tsukkomi-no-Mikoto" (ゲラゲラのツッコミのみこと, Geragera Tsukkomi no Mikoto) and the mark on his eggshell underpants is a vermillion speech bubble with a smiling face. He is comediec and hates to lose. He loves comedy so much that he forgets to be called "The TV God" and calls himself "The Laughing God." He is a rival and a fighting friend of LuckyTama.

Kirarise (キラリス, Kirarisu)
Voiced by: Ryōka Yuzuki

Kirarise is a purple kangaroo-like Cocotama born from a lipstick that Kokoro's mother, Misato uses to wear, and is referred to as "The Lip God". Her full name is "Sparkling Love-Love Lipstick-no-Mikoto" (キラキラのラブラブのリップスティックのみこと, Kirakira no Raburabu no Rippu Sutikku no Mikoto) and the mark on her eggshell underpants is a pair of two yellow sparkles. She is sexy and slightly selfish. She is older than the other Cocotamas, and is very fashionable. For better or worse, she is self-absorbed and shows a glimpse of her narcissistic side.

Mogutan (モグタン)
Voiced by: Michiyo Murase

Mogutan is a yellow giraffe-like Cocotama born from a fork, and is referred to as "The Fork God". His full name is "Mogu-Mogu Pekorita-no-Mikoto" (モグモグのペコリータのみこと, Mogumogu Pekorīta no Mikoto) and the mark on his eggshell underpants is a violet chef hat. He is laid-back with a huge appetite. He is often sleepy, but gets excited when it comes to food. He has a strong obsession of food, and loves marshmallows more than everyone else. Since he learned how to make food, he is shown to be a good cook.

Sarine (サリーヌ, Sarīnu) and Parine (パリーヌ, Parīnu)
Voiced by: Ayumi Fujimura (Sarine), Yuri Shiratori (Parine)

Sarine and Parine are the twin pale pink and pale blue cow and bull-like Cocotamas born from a bottle of shampoo, and are referred to as "The Shampoo Gods". Sarine's full name is "Refreshing Awa-Awa Wash-no-Mikoto" (さっぱりアワアワあらいのみこと, Sappari Awaawa Arai no Mikoto) while Parine's full name is "Refreshing Tsuya-Tsuya Wash-no-Mikoto (さっぱりツヤツヤあらいのみこと, Sappari Tsuyatsuya Arai no Mikoto), and the mark on their eggshell underpants is an indigo raindrop, with Sarine having a cornflower blue sparkle in the middle, and Parine having a cornflower blue heart sparkle in the middle. Sarine is energetic and proactive. She is curious and always smiling. She is also a positive thinker who is not afraid to try things that scare her, making her a bit of troublemaker. Parine is shy and negative, and has a gloomy and dark side. They also go berserk if they get dirty.

Mishil (ミシル, Mishiru)
Voiced by: Fumiko Orikasa

Mishil is a red butterfly-like Cocotama born from the Yotsuba family's mailbox, and is referred to as "The Post God". Her full name is "Miru-Miru no Shiru-Shiru's Gets The Scope-no-Mikoto" (ミルミルのシルシルのスクープゲットのみこと, Mirumiru no Shirushiru no Skūpu Getto no Mikoto) and the mark on her eggshell underpants is a green envelope. She is a spy Cocotama who makes uses her furoshiki as a cloak, which makes her useful in many ways, and investigating spies.

Kanna (カンナ, Kan'na)
Voiced by: Saki Fujita

Kanna is a blue Labrador-like Cocotama born from the clock tower at the Aozora Town park, and is referred to as "The Clock God". The mark on her eggshell underpants is a pink clock. She is a full-fledged Cocotama who lost her adult eggshell underpants while being assend to the Cocotama World. She is a hard-working girl. And before she gets them back, she has to live with the other Cocotamas that Kokoro made a contract.

=== Cocotamas Contracted to Nozomi ===
Vivit (ビビット, Bibitto)
Voiced by: Sayuri Yahagi

Vivit is a female light teal mouse-like Cocotama born from Nozomi's locket pendant, and is referred to as "The Locket God". Her full title is "Vivid Heart-no-Mikoto" (ビビットハートのみこと, Bibitto Hāto no Mikoto) and the mark in her pants is a pink heart with a key in it. Her name is shortened from Vivid Heart.

Renge (レンジ, Renji)
Voiced by: Aya Endō

Renge is a male purple fox-like Cocotama born from Nozomi's paintbrush, and is referred to as the "Paintbrush God". The mark on his pants is a magenta paintbrush and his name is a pun of the word "Arrange".

Pinko (ピンコ, Pinko)
Voiced by: Yūko Gibu

Pinco is a female orange dog-like Cocotama born from Nozomi's money purse, and is referred to as the "Purse Goddess". The mark on her pants is an orange shopping bag.

Nicolie (ニコリ, Nikori)
Voiced by: Kaede Hondo

Nicolie is a female light yellow squirrel-like baby Cocotama born from Nozomi's baby towel, and is referred as the "Towel Goddess". The mark in her pants is a chartreuse flower.

=== Cocotamas Contracted to Hikari ===
Raichi (ライチ, Raichi)
Voiced by: Ayaka Nanase

Raichi is a male sky blue unicorn-like Cocotama born from Hikari's treasured playing cards that she used during her street performance, and is referred as the "Card God". The mark on his eggshell underpants is a blue clock. While he is laid-back yet clumsy, he had lost most of his memories due to an incident that made him and Hikari forget about each other, per the contract rules. As a result, Raichi is now tied to a temporary contract, and if he doesn't make Hikari's wish come true and repair the broken ace of spades card in time, he and Hikari will forget each other once more, and he will return to the playing cards he was born from.

Pikota (ピコタ, Pikota)
Voiced by: Kei Shindō

Pikota is a male robotic emerald green frog-like Cocotama born from a Printing press and is referred as the "Printing Press God". His full title is "PiPiPi to Copy de Arimasu no Mikoto" (ピピピとコピーでありますのみこと, Pipipi to Kopī de Arimasu no Mikoto) and the mark on his eggshell underpants is three yellow diamonds. If anyone removes the pin on his head, he will malfunction.

Chocolancy (ショコランシエ, Shokoranshie)
Voiced by: Ryō Hirohashi

Chocolancy is female rose red reindeer-like Cocotama born from a randoseru and is referred as the "Randoseru Goddess". Like Picota, Chocolancy came to the CocoTre House to practice her skills as an apprentice god and met with Raichi. She familiarize with him as an Older Brother, much to his dismay and is very determined. Because of her determination, she can challenge anything thrown at her and has exceptional human strength. Her favorite food is Chocolate. She later left the CocoTre House later in the series. Her full name is "Lan Lan no Share Suru Wa no Mikoto" (ランランのシェアするわのみこと, Ranran no Shea Suru wa no Mikoto) and the mark on her eggshell underpants is a two purple semicircles.

Pocaline (ポカリン, Pokarin)
Voiced by: Yuka Iguchi

Pocaline is a female orange fox-like Cocotama born from a pair of winter Gloves Rin once owned and is referred as the "Glove Goddess". Her full name is "Poca Poca no Attaka Tsutsumi no Mikoto" (ぽかぽかのあったかつつみのみこと, Pokapoka no Attaka Tsutsumi no Mikoto) and the mark on her pants is a light blue sun.

Heaton (ヒートン, Hīton)
Voiced by: Aki Kanada

Pocaline's older brother, Heaton is a red fox-like Cocotama born from a winter scarf that Rin uses and is referred as the "Scarf God". His full name is "Heat Deata ka Kurumi no Mikoto" (ヒートであったかくるみのみこと, Hīto Deatta ka Kurumi no Mikoto) and the mark on his pants is a green sun.

=== Straytama Trio ===
The Straytama Trio (ノラたまトリオ, Noratama Torio) are a group of Cocotama who were born from the playground equipment that the kids use. Noratama means "Stray Soul" in Japanese.

Yurano (ユラノ, Yurano)
Voiced by: Megumi Toyoguchi, Miki Nagasawa (Episode 55)
Yurano is a female feline-like Magenta colored Cocotama who is born from the Swings of an abandoned playground, and is referred to as the "Swing Goddess".
Tokumaru (とくまる, Tokumaru)
Voiced by: Yuka Terasaki
Tokumaru is a male bird-like blue colored Cocotama who is born from the seesaw of an abandoned playground, and is referred to as the "Seesaw God".
Mukitetsu (ムキテツ, Mukitetsu)
Voiced by: Tomohiro Tsuboi
Mukitetsu is a Dog-Like male teal colored Cocotama who is born from the horizontal bar of an abandoned playground, and is referred to as the "High Bar God".

=== Other Cocotamas ===
Tama-Sennin (たま仙人, Tama sennin)
Voiced by: Tomohiro Tsuboi

Tama-Sennin is one of the leaders of the Cocotamas and the oldest who ever lived; he was born from a flute. He is colored gray with a long beard, wears a loincloth and wields a wooden staff.

Bannosuke (バン之介, Bannosuke)
Voiced by: Makoto Tsumura

Appearing in Episode 11, he is a brown rabbit-like Cocotama who is born from an abacus in the Candy Store and is referred to as the "Abacus God".

Dashimaki (ダシマキ)
Voiced by: Noriko Shibasaki

Appearing in Episode 24, Dashimaki is a yellow male rabbit Cocotama who is born from a study desk and is referred as the "Desk God".

Yozepp (ヨセップ, Yozeppu)
Voiced by: Chiaki Mori

Appearing in Episode 38, Yozepp is a green male yak-like Cocotama born from a Bookcase and is referred as the "Bookcase God".

Sham (シャム, Shamu)
Voiced by: Kaede Yuasa

Appearing in Episode 38, Sham is pink female rabbit-like Cocotama born from a Chopsticks and is referred as the "Chopsticks Goddess".

Michel (ミッケル, Mikkeru)
Voiced by: Haruka Mikami

Appearing in Episode 38, Michel is purple female owl-like Cocotama born from a Magnifying glass and is referred as the "Magnifying Glass Goddess".

Niche (ニーチエ, Nīche)
Voiced by: Yū Shimamura

Appearing in Episode 41, Niche is a green male dog-like Cocotama born from the encyclopedias in the town library and is referred as the "Book God".

Hotney (ホットニー, Hoittonī)
Voiced by: Noriko Shitaya

Appearing in Episode 41, Hotney is a yellow female leaf insect-like Cocotama who is born from a Digital Medical thermometer and is referred as the "Nurse Goddess". Her full title is "Age Age no Sage Sa-Ge no Mikoto" (あげあげのさげさげのみこと, Age Age no Sage Sa-Ge no Mikoto) and the mark on her pants is a pair of pink up and down arrows.

Tototon (トトトン, Tototon)
Voiced by: Chiyako Shibahara

Appearing in Episode 44, Tototon is a female pig-like Cocotama born from a Cutting board and referred as the "Cutting Board Goddess".

Ukero (ウケロー, Ukerō)
Voiced by: Junko Noda

Appearing in Episode 50, Ukero is a male beaver-like Cocotama born from a Baseball glove and referred as the "Baseball Glove God".

Mush-Mukunyu (ムッシュ・ムクンヌ, Musshu mukun'nu)
Voiced by: Maaya Uchida

Appearing in Episode 58, Mush-Mukunyu is a male parrot-like Cocotama born from a Drawing board and referred as the "Drawing Board God".

Yukki (ゆっきー, Yukki)
Voiced by: Mitsuki Saiga

Appearing in Episode 71, Yuuki is a snowman-like Cocotama born from a Shovel and referred as the "Shovel God".

Cinemaru (シネマル, Shinemaru)
Voiced by: Akeno Watanabe

Appearing in Episode 79, Cinemaru is a black male Cocotama born from a Movie projector and referred as the "Movie Projector God".

Tepple (テップル, Teppuru)
Voiced by: Mariya Ise

The movie's main protagonist and later appearing in the anime of Episode 107, Tepple is a female pink ivory dog-like Cocotama born from a pair of Dance Shoes that Mai once owned and is referred as the "Dance Shoes Goddess". Her full title is "Nice Step Puru-Puru Rhythm no Mikoto" (ナイスステップ プルプルリズムのみこと, Naisu Suteppu Puru Puru Pururizumu no Mikoto) and the mark on her pants is a light blue eighth note with a wing in it.

Coco-Sennin (ここ仙人, Koko sennin)
Voiced by: Daiki Nakamura

Appearing in the movie and later appearing in the anime of Episode 127, Coco-Sennin is a hamster-like Cocotama and one of the leaders of the Cocotamas.

Hapipina (ハピピナ, Hapipina)
Voiced by: Yukina Kinoshita

Appearing in the movie and later appearing in the anime of Episode 139, Hapipina is a female hamster-like Cocotama who is born from a Firecracker and is referred as the "Firecracker Goddess".

Patarina (パタリーナ, Patarīna)
Voiced by: Yū Kobayashi

Appearing in the Episode 91, Patarina is a purple female Cocotama who is born from a Feather duster and is referred as the "Feather Duster Goddess". Her mark in her pants is a blue sparkle.

Kurun (クルン, Kurun)
Voiced by: Kumiko Nishihara

Appearing in the Episode 102, Kurun is a light green female Cocotama who is born from a Dress and is referred as the "Dress Goddess".

Bells (ベルス, Berusu)
Voiced by: Daiki Kobayashi

Appearing in the Episode 113, Bells is a green male Cocotama who is born from a Sled and is referred as the "Sled God".

Awawa (アワワ, Awawa)
Voiced by: Azumi Asakura

Appearing in Episode 116, Awawa is a gold Cocotama who was born from a rainbow-colored soap and is referred as the "Soap Goddess".

Tama-Shine (たまシャイン, Tama shain)
Voiced by: Sayaka Kinoshita

Appearing in Episode 127, Tama-Shine is one of the leaders of the Cocotamas and the current ruler of the Cocotama World who is born from a stamp and is referred as the "Stamp Goddess".

Suie (スーイ, Sūi)
Voiced by: Yūki Sorami

Appearing in the Episode 131, Suie is a yellow bird-like female Cocotama born from a Bicycle and is referred as the "Bicycle Goddess". Her mark in her pants is a light blue wave.

Charie (チャーリー, Chārī)
Voiced by: Yūki Kodaira

Appearing in the Episode 132, Suie's older brother, he is a green bird-like male Cocotama born from a Bicycle and is referred as the "Bicycle God". He wears yellow-colored pants.

Cala (カーラ, Kāra)
Voiced by: Hibiku Yamamura

Appearing in Episode 139, Cala is a green female Cocotama who was born from a crayon and is referred as the "Crayon Goddess".

== Sub characters ==
=== Yotsuba Family ===
Makoto Yotsuba (四葉 まこと, Yotsuba Makoto)
Voiced by: Yuka Terasaki

Kokoro's younger brother.

Koichi Yotsuba (四葉 幸一, Yotsuba Kōichi)
Voiced by: Tomohiro Tsuboi

Kokoro's father and a renowned architect at a housing company.

Misato Yotsuba (四葉 美里, Yotsuba Misato)
Voiced by: Fumiko Orikasa

Kokoro's mother and both a worker and owner of a knitting and fabric store in town.

Haruko Yachigusa (八千草 晴子, Yachigusa Haruko)
Voiced by: Yumi Kakazu

Kokoro's grandmother and Misato's mother, who taught Kokoro about the importance of things and treasuring them.

Akio Yachigusa (八千草 明生, Yachigusa Akio)
Voiced by: Suzune Okabe

Kokoro's grandfather.

Amanda (アマンダ)
Voiced by: Ryōka Yuzuki

The pet cat owned by the Yotsubas.

=== Hidamari Elementary School ===
Ayaka Otsuki (大槻 あやか, Ōtsuki Ayaka)
Voiced by: Noriko Shibasaki

One of Kokoro's two best friends in school, who is part of the Basketball Club.

Hina Hoshino (星野 ひな, Hoshino Hina)
Voiced by: Haruka Mikami

Also one of Kokoro's friends in school.

Kiyomi Nishina (仁科 清美, Nishina Kiyomi)
Voiced by: Michiyo Murase

One of Kokoro's classmates who is a fan of anything supernatural.

Atsushi Watabe (渡部 篤志, Watabe Atsushi)
Voiced by: Yuka Nishigaki
Kate Hasegawa (長谷川 ケイト, Hasegawa Keito)
Voiced by: Kaede Yuasa
Kaede Akikawa (秋川 かえで, Akikawa Kaede)
Voiced by: Natsuki Aikawa
Yoko Takamura (高村 陽子, Takamura Yōko)
Voiced by: Yuka Terasaki
Seitarou Ichinose (一之瀬 清太郎, Ichinose Seitarō)
Voiced by: Toshiya Hiruma
Masaru Miyamoto (宮本 勝, Miyamoto Masaru)
Voiced by: Suzune Okabe
Mineko Kiteyama (北山 峰子, Kitayama Mineko)
Voiced by: Rikako Aikawa

Kokoro's homeroom teacher in school.

Akane Saionji (西園寺 あかね, Saionji Akane)
Voiced by: Ayumi Fujimura (Episodes 19–37), Yuri Shiratori (Episode 56 onwards)
Kinji Narita (成田 きんじ, Narita Kinji)
Voiced by: Natsuki Aikawa
Takuma Kondou (近藤 琢磨, Kondou Takuma)
Voiced by: Natsuki Aikawa
Minoru Yawata (八幡 実, Yawata Minoru)
Voiced by: Kaede Yuasa
Perere (ペレレ, Perere)
Voiced by: Suguru Inoue

=== Others ===
Mai Kinouchi (木ノ内 まい, Kinouchi Mai)
Voiced by: Reina Ueda

The main human character making her first appearance in the movie, Mai is a 5th grade student from Suzuran Elementary School.
