= Ryuji Kamiyama =

Japanese actor and former singer

- 上山 竜治
- Born: September 10, 1986 (age 40); Tokyo, Japan
- Occupation: Actor
- Spouse: Kurara Chibana (m. 2017)
- Musical career
- Genre: J-pop
- Years active: 2001–present
- Formerly of: Run&Gun
- Website: www.kamiyamaryuji.com

Ryuji Kamiyama (上山 竜治, Kamiyama Ryūji; born September 10, 1986, in Tokyo) is a Japanese actor and former singer. He was a member of the boy band Run&Gun from 2001 to 2014.

== Career ==
In 2000, at the age of 14, Kamiyama was part of D.A.N.K. (Daisuke Asakura New Kids), a performance troupe produced by Daisuke Asakura. In 2001, he appeared on the audition program Study Park!!, where he was selected as one of the members for the boy band Run&Gun, later debuting on July 4, 2001 with the single "Lay-Up!" During his time with the group, in 2005, Kamiyama also released a solo song titled "Byū Byū Kuru Yasashisa wa" for Run&Gun's first extended play, Hateshinai Tabi no Naka de...

In 2007, Kamiyama was cast as Romeo in the stage play adaptation of Air Gear. In the second installment he took over the lead role of Minami Ikki after Kenta Kamakari fell ill. He broke his arm during the second-to-last showing of the musical; however, he continued performing. In addition to this, Kamiyama also published his first novel, Flying Melon, which was co-written with Kosuke Yonehara. In 2009, Kamiyama starred in the all-male stage adaptation of Fruits Basket as Kyo Soma. In 2014, Kamiyama left Run&Gun to focus on acting full-time.

== Personal life ==
In October 2017, Kamiyama married model Kurara Chibana and they had two daughters.

== Filmography ==
=== Movie ===
- Route 58 (2003)
- jam filmsシリーズ min.jam第4話 (2005)
- Hashiriya Zero 2 (2009)

=== TV Drama ===
- クッキングパパ - Cooking papa (2008)

=== Theatre ===
Year	Title	Role	Notes
2004	Into the Woods	Jack	Theatre Debut
2007	Air Gear	Romeo	
2008	The Sound of Music	Rolf	—
2009	Fruits Basket	Kyo Soma	Strawberry Team version; double-cast with Dai Yamazaki
2009	EVIL DEAD THE MUSICAL	Scott	
2009	Le Rouge et le Noir	Julien Sorel	
2011	Dracula, the Musical	John "Jack" Seward, M.D.	
2013	Merrily We Roll Along	Tyler	
2014-2019	Black Mary Poppins	Herman	Reprised role in 2016 and 2019 runs
2015	Hana Yori Dango	Akira Mimasaka	
2015-2019	Les Misérables	Enjolras	Reprised role in 2017 and 2019 runs, Double-casts with Rio Uehara, Naoto Nojima, Hiroki Aiba and Ryunosuke Onoda
2016	Vincent van Gogh	Theo	
2019	West Side Story: Season 1	Riff	Double-cast with Ryunosuke Onoda
2021	A Sign of Affection	Kyōya	
2022	Claudia	Yan	
2022-2023	Elisabeth	Luigi Lucheni	
2023	Marie Curie	Pierre Curie	
