= Air Gear =

Japanese manga series

- First tankōbon volume cover, featuring Ikki Minami with his pet crow, Kuu

エア・ギア (Ea Gia)
- Genre: Action, sports
- Manga
- Written by: Oh! great
- Published by: Kodansha
- English publisher: NA: Del Rey Manga (former); Kodansha USA
- Imprint: Shōnen Magazine Comics
- Magazine: Weekly Shōnen Magazine
- Original run: November 6, 2002 – May 23, 2012
- Volumes: 37
- Anime television series
- Directed by: Hajime Kamegaki
- Produced by: Nobuaki Suzuki; Takao Yoshizawa
- Written by: Chiaki J. Konaka
- Music by: Wall5; skankfunk; Masao Mase; Rowii; YA3; Masaki Sakamoto
- Studio: Toei Animation
- Licensed by: Crunchyroll
- Original network: TV Tokyo
- English network: AUS: Adult Swim; SA: Animax Asia; SEA: Animax Asia; US: Anime Network
- Original run: April 4, 2006 – September 26, 2006
- Episodes: 25
- Original animation DVD

Break on the Sky
- Directed by: Shinji Ishihira
- Produced by: Kensuke Tateishi; Masakazu Yoshimoto; Shōya Fukuda
- Written by: Atsushi Maekawa
- Music by: Shigerō Yoshida
- Studio: Satelight
- Released: November 17, 2010 – June 17, 2011
- Runtime: 28 minutes
- Episodes: 3
- icon

Air Gear (Japanese: エア・ギア, Hepburn: Ea Gia) is a Japanese manga series written and illustrated by Oh! great, serialized in Kodansha's shōnen manga magazine Weekly Shōnen Magazine from November 2002 to May 2012, with its chapters collected in 37 tankōbon volumes. Air Gear revolves around the life of Itsuki Minami "Ikki or Crow", also known as "Baby Face", "Lil (and Little) Crow", and his friends. The story follows their use of Air Gear, an in-universe invention derived from inline skates. Initial sections of the plot carries out the introduction of characters that eventually join Ikki. As the story progresses, it focuses on their roles as Storm Riders and their quest to be on the top of the Trophaeum Tower, the pinnacle that all Storm Riders hope to reach.

Air Gear was adapted into a 25-episode anime television series by Toei Animation, which aired on TV Tokyo from April to September 2006. A three-episode original video animation (OVA), titled Air Gear: Break on the Sky, produced by Satelight, was released from November 2010 to June 2011.

Air Gear had over 18 million copies in circulation by August 2020. It won the 31st Kodansha Manga Award for the shōnen category in 2006.

== Plot ==
A new fad by the name of "Air Treks" (a futuristic evolution of aggressive skating) has swept the nation's youth and all over gangs are being formed that compete in various events using their A-Ts. Ikki is a middle-school boy who is the toughest street-fighting punk on the east side of town and part of the gang "The East-Side Gunz". He lives with four adopted gorgeous sisters who took him in when he was a kid. But what Ikki does not know is that the girls are part of one of the most infamous A-T gangs, "Sleeping Forest". It does not take long before Ikki finds out about the world of Air Treks and is propelled into a fate he had not foreseen, learning about his past and making a number of storm riding allies on the way.

== Media ==
=== Manga ===
Written and illustrated by Oh! Great, Air Gear was serialized in Kodansha's shōnen manga magazine Weekly Shōnen Magazine from November 6, 2002, to May 23, 2012. Kodansha collected its 357 individual chapters into 37 tankōbon volumes, published under its Shōnen Magazine Comics imprint, from May 16, 2003, to July 17, 2012. A one-shot chapter was published in the magazine on December 22, 2015.

The manga was licensed for release in North America by Del Rey Manga and the first volume was released on July 25, 2006. They published the first 17 volumes. Kodansha USA published the rest of the series under the Kodansha Comics imprint after Del Rey's shut down.

=== Anime ===
An anime adaptation covering 12 volumes of the manga was produced by Toei Animation, Marvelous and Avex Entertainment and directed by Hajime Kamegaki, with Chiaki J. Konaka handling series composition and writing episode scripts, Masayuki Satō designing the characters and skankfunk, Wall5 Project and Masaki Sakamoto composing the music. ADV Films announced over the October 20, 2006, weekend at Oni-Con that they had licensed the anime for release in the United States; the anime in its entirety reportedly cost $780,000. Though few of the actual artists and inside creators of Air Gear were actually there. The few that were there included Loa Mitsoyagi (Ikki), Ian Miller (Agito), Jason Remmings (Kazuma), and the ADV representing team. The first volume was released on February 6, 2007. ADV released the uncensored Japanese home video version, rather than the broadcast version. On January 3, 2007, IGN released a special sneak peek of Episode 1 of the English dub. In 2008, Air Gear became one of over 30 ADV titles transferred to Funimation. In Australia and New Zealand, the series is licensed by Madman Entertainment.

Avex released one single and two albums covering all the songs and themes used for the anime adaptation. The opening theme single "Chain" performed by Back-on was released on June 7, 2006, and peak ranked 139th on Oricon singles chart. The two albums Air Gear original soundtrack: What a Groovy Tricks!! and Air Gear original soundtrack 2: Who wants more Groovy Trick!!?? were released on August 23, 2006, and February 28, 2007, respectively.

=== Original video animation ===
In July 2010, it was announced that a new Air Gear original video animation (OVA) would be released alongside the limited edition of the manga's 30th volume. Animation studio Satelight animated the OVA instead of Toei with Shinji Ishihira as director, Atsushi Maekawa as script writer, Osamu Horiuchi as character designer and Stanislas Brunet as mechanical design. Nobuhiko Okamoto plays Ikki, Haruka Tomatsu plays Ringo, and Yukari Fukui plays Kururu.

The first OVA was released on November 17, 2010, and adapted the confrontation between Ikki and Ringo from volume 16 of the manga. The second OVA was released on March 17 and the final third OVA was released on June 17, 2011. The latter two OVAs adapt the legendary battle between Kogarasumaru and Sleeping Forest from volumes 24 and 25 of the manga.

=== Musical ===
Air Gear was adapted into a musical called Musical Air Gear, which made its debut on January 7, 2007, and ran until January 21, 2007. The musical is loosely adapted from the manga and all female roles are eliminated from the plot. The cast featured Kenta Kamakari, KENN, and Kenjiro Tsuda reprising their roles from the anime respectively as Ikki, Kazu, and Spitfire with Masaki Kaji (who had also starred with Kenta and KENN in the Prince of Tennis musicals), Run&Gun, etc. as their co-stars. In the musical, team Kogarasumaru opposes team Bacchus, whose names all come from works of Shakespeare. (Romeo, Juliet, Hamlet, Macbeth and Puck).

Due to the success and popularity of the musical's first run, the musical had a rerun in May, 2007 titled, Musical Air Gear vs. Bacchus Super Range Remix (ミュージカル｢エア·ギア｣vs.バッカス Super Range Remix, Myūjikaru "Ea Gia" tai Bakkasu Sūpā Renji Rimikkusu) with the entire cast, except for Kenta Kamakari due to illness, reprising their roles. Ryuji Kamiyama (originally Romeo) replaced Kamakari, subsequently Kosuke Yonehara (originally Hamlet) took over the role of Romeo and a new actor was brought in to play Hamlet.

In April, 2010 there was a third run of the musical, It was titled 'Musical Air Gear vs. Bacchus Top Gear Remix.' Many cast members reprise their roles, Kenta Kamakari returning as Ikki. Remarkably, Agito's actor was replaced by a younger actor and the original actor now played the part of Juliet. The role of Spitfire was replaced by Aeon Clock.

== Reception ==
By August 2020, Air Gear had over 18 million copies in circulation. It won the 2006 Kodansha Manga Award in the shōnen category.

Anime News Network gave the first manga volume an overall positive review praising the artwork but criticizing the story. BlogCritics said "It mixes this action and comedy quite well with a storyline that doesn't fail to leave a reader wanting more." The anime has often been criticized for not remaining true to the manga, story and skipping parts, but is praised for its soundtrack. The English dub has received positive reviews since its release. AnimeOnDVD said "The concept of the show is one that is pure anime though and something that visually can be done very well". The anime's ending was cited as underwhelming despite its mostly positive reviews.
