= Run&Gun =

Japanese boy band

- Origin: Japan
- Genres: J-pop
- Years active: 2001–present
- Labels: Antinos; Epic Japan; R and C Ltd.
- Members: Yuya Miyashita; Kosuke Yonehara; Akira Nagata
- Past members: Ryuji Kamiyama
- Website: www.runandgun.co.jp

Run&Gun (stylized as RUN&GUN) is a Japanese boy band and performance troupe associated with Yoshimoto Kogyo. The group was formed in 2001 by Antinos Records. The members consist of Yuya Miyashita, Kosuke Yonehara, and Akira Nagata; Ryuji Kamiyama left the group in 2014.

Run&Gun debuted in 2001 with the song "Lay-Up!" and were initially produced by Daisuke Asakura before moving to Epic Records Japan in 2002. Throughout their career, Run&Gun also engaged in theater projects, including their own self-produced stage plays and Air Gear. In 2008, they announced they were putting their musical releases on hiatus and planned to focus on their acting projects instead.

== History ==
=== 2001–2006: Debut and early years ===
Miyashita, Kamiyama, Yonehara, and Nagata were part of D.A.N.K. (Daisuke Asakura New Kids), a performance troupe produced by Daisuke Asakura. In 2001, they were selected as members for Run&Gun through an audition television program called Study Park!! On July 4, 2001, they debuted with the song "Lay-Up!", which was used as an opening theme song for Study Park!! Their second single, "Ready Go!" was released on August 29, 2001 as the theme song to a Lotte commercial. Their third single, "Twinkle Starlight", was released on December 5, 2001, as the ending theme song to the television series Danmaru! Heroes.

Following the release of "Peace Out Iza, Saraba" on March 6, 2002, Run&Gun was transferred to Epic Records Japan and parted ways with Asakura. They released their fifth single, "Loop", on July 10, 2002 as the ending theme to Show Up Nighter. Afterwards, their sixth single, "Wishing On", was released on November 20, 2002. Their seventh single, "Shootin' to My Eyes", was released on February 19, 2003. They released the song "Mi-ra-i" on May 21, 2003 as the first ending theme song to Sonic X. Following its release, Run&Gun released their first studio album, Face, on July 16, 2003. In the summer of 2003, Run&Gun held their first tour titled Blue Journey.

In 2004, Run&Gun departed from Epic Records Japan and signed onto Yoshimoto Kogyo, where they released their ninth single, "Believe", on August 18, 2004. On January 19, 2005, they released "Blackjack" as the ending theme to Jack Sports. On February 23, 2005, they released their extended play, Hateshinai Tabi no Naka de... On June 21, 2006, they released their second studio album, Re:ing.

=== 2007–present: Focus on acting ===
After Re:ing was released, Run&Gun began branching out and focusing on other projects. In 2007, Kamiyama and Yonehara published a novel together titled Flying Melon. Run&Gun also starred as Team Bacchus in the stage play adaptation of Air Gear, an original team made for the musical. In January 2008, Run&Gun held their first group-produced stage play, Blue Sheets, followed up with another stage play titled YooSoRo!: Nihon o Kaeta Yatsura o Kaeta Yatsura. Later in 2008, Run&Gun announced a hiatus on their musical releases, stating that they planned to focus on acting projects within and outside of the group.

In February 2009, Kamiyama and Yonehara were cast in the all-male stage adaptation of Fruits Basket. In 2010, Run&Gun ran their third stage play, Bokura no Chikara de Sekai ga Ato Nankai Sukueta ka. In April 2010, Run&Gun reprised their roles as Team Bacchus in the Air Gear stage play. In 2014, Kamiyama left the group to pursue acting full-time.

== Discography ==
=== Studio albums ===
Title	Year	Details	Peak chart positions	Sales
Title	Year	Details	JPN	Sales
Face	2003	Released: July 16, 2003; Label: Epic Records Japan; Format: CD; Track listing: 1. "Overture: Yakusoku (Blue Journey)" (OVERTURE“yakusoku”～BLUE JOURNEY); 2. "Bokura no Rule" (僕らのルール); 3. "Lay-Up!"; 4. "Ready Go!"; 5. "Kokuhaku" (告白); 6. "Wishing On"; 7. "Hikari e Kimi e" (光へ 君へ); 8. "Mi-ra-i" (ミ・ラ・イ); 9. "Love & Smile"; 10. "Shootin' to My Eyes"; 11. "Yakusoku (Hello Goodby)" (約束～hello goodby～)	77	—
Re:ing	2006	Released: June 21, 2006; Label: R & C Ltd.; Format: CD; Track listing: 1. "All Right! Friends" (オーライ!フレンズ); 2. "Glider" (album version); 3. "Linked Together"; 4. "Nagisa Beautiful" (渚・ビューティホー); 5. "Sekai wa Boku o Mitenai" (世界は僕を見てない); 6. "Mai Agare" (舞い上がれ); 7. "Sky in Heart" (album version); 8. "Brave" (album version); 9. "Get Back"; 10. "Minna no Yume" (みんなのゆめ); 11. "Christmas Time in Yeah"; 12. "Iris no Hana Kotoba" (アイリスの花言葉)	—	—
"—" denotes releases that did not chart or were not released in that region.

=== Extended plays ===
Title	Year	Details	Peak chart positions	Sales
Title	Year	Details	JPN	Sales
Hateshinai Tabi no Naka de... (果てしない旅の中で・・・; lit. "In the Middle of an Endless Journey...")	2005	Released: February 23, 2005; Label: R & C Ltd.; Format: CD; Track listing: 1. "Big Bang!"; 2. "Time Shock" (feat. Akira); 3. "Yuya no Seishun Densetsu" (ユウヤの青春伝説) (feat. Yuya); 4. "Blackjack" (ブラックジャック); 5. "Byū Byū Kuru Yasashisa wa" (ビュービューくる優しさは) (feat. Ryuji); 6. "Memories" (メモリーズ) (feat. Kosuke); 7. "Aozora" (青空)	—	—
"—" denotes releases that did not chart or were not released in that region.

=== Singles ===
Title	Year	Peak chart positions	Sales	Album
Title	Year	JPN	Sales	Album
"Lay-Up!"	2001	68	—	Face
"Ready Go!"	2001	65	—	Face
"Twinkle Starlight"	2001	56	—	Non-album single
"Peace Out Iza, Saraba" (Peace Out イザ、サラバ。)	2002	40	—	Non-album single
"Loop"	2002	32	—	Non-album single
"Wishing On"	2002	34	—	Face
"Shootin' to My Eyes"	2003	39	—	Face
"Mi-ra-i" (ミ・ラ・イ)	2003	65	—	Face
"Believe"	2004	117	—	Non-album single
"Blackjack" (ブラックジャック)	2005	124	—	Hateshinai Tabi no Naka de...
"—" denotes releases that did not chart or were not released in that region.

=== Video albums ===
Title	Year	Details	Peak chart positions	Sales
Title	Year	Details	JPN	Sales
Alley-oop	2002	Released: September 9, 2002; Label: Antinos Records; Format: DVD; Track listing: 1. "Lay-Up!"; 2. "Ready Go!"; 3. "Twinkle Starlight"; 4. "Peace Out Iza, Saraba" (Peace Out イザ、サラバ。); 5. "Loop"	32	—
Memory of Voyage	2003	Released: August 6, 2003; Label: Antinos Records; Format: DVD; Track listing: 1. "Wishing On"; 2. "Shootin' to My Eyes"; 3. "Mi-ra-i" (ミ・ラ・イ)	—	—
"—" denotes releases that did not chart or were not released in that region.
