= Suzune Okabe =

Japanese voice actor

- 岡部涼音
- Born: November 4, 1984 (age 40)
- Occupation: Voice actor
- Agent: Ogipro the Next

Suzune Okabe (岡部 涼音 Okabe Suzune, born November 4, 1984) is a Japanese voice actor affiliated with Ogipro the Next. He plays the role of Naoki Shiratori from Days.

== Filmography ==
List of voice acting role in anime television

• DAYS (TV), Naoki Shiratori; Referee (ep 5)

• Natsume's Book of Friends (TV 4), Sarumen from the Eastern forest (eps 1-2); Teacher (ep 5)

• Pokémon Generations (ONA) (eps 14, 16); Ryokushi (ep 13)

• Samurai Warriors: Legend of the Sanada, Messenger

• Vampire Knight Guilty, Evening Party Guest (ep 2); Man of the Senate (ep 1); Rido's Servant (ep 10); Vampire (ep 9)

• When They Cry - Higurashi, Man A (ep 15); Store manager (ep 17)

• Yu-Gi-Oh! 5D's (TV), Bolger; Guard Robot; Shira
