= Ryo Kimura =

Japanese actor (born 1988)

Ryo Kimura 木村 了
- Born: September 23, 1988 (age 37); Mitaka, Tokyo, Japan
- Occupation: Actor
- Years active: 2002—present
- Spouse: Megumi Okina (m. 2016)
- Website: http://www.horipro.co.jp/hm/kimura/index.php

Ryo Kimura (木村 了, Kimura Ryō; born September 23, 1988) is a Japanese actor who debuted in 2002. His first movie was Moonlight Jellyfish, in which he co-starred with Tatsuya Fujiwara. He played the role of Michio, a mentally challenged 15-year-old boy diagnosed with an incurable skin disease called XP (Xeroderma Pigmentosum).

== Filmography ==
=== Television ===
Year	Title	Role	Other notes	Ref.
2020	Awaiting Kirin	Oda Nobuyuki	Taiga drama	
2023	Ōoku: The Inner Chambers	Nakazawa		
2025	Unbound	Hezutsu Tōsaku	Taiga drama	
2025	Replica: Revenge of the Ex-Wife	Kippei Fujimura		

=== Movies ===
Year	Title	Role	Other notes	Ref.
2011	Bunny Drop	Yuichi Suzuki		
2022	Usogui: Lie Eater			
2024	6 Lying University Students			
