= Power =

Power may refer to:

== Common meanings ==
- Power (physics), meaning "rate of doing work"
  - Engine power, the power put out by an engine
  - Electric power, a type of energy
- Power (political science), the ability to influence people or events

== Mathematics, science and technology ==
=== Computing ===
- IBM POWER (software), an IBM operating system enhancement package
- IBM POWER architecture, a RISC instruction set architecture
- Power ISA, a RISC instruction set architecture derived from PowerPC
- IBM Power microprocessors, made by IBM, which implement those RISC architectures
- Power.org, a predecessor to the OpenPOWER Foundation

=== Mathematics ===
- Exponentiation, "x to the power of y"
- Power function
- Power of a point
- Statistical power

=== Physics ===
- Magnification, the factor by which an optical system enlarges an image
- Optical power, the degree to which a lens converges or diverges light

== Social sciences and politics ==
- Economic power, encompassing several concepts that economists use, featuring the word "power"
- Power (international relations), the ability to influence states

== Arts, entertainment, and media ==
=== Fictional entities ===
- Power (Chainsaw Man), a character from the anime and manga series Chainsaw Man
- Power Girl, a character in the DC Comics universe
- Power Pack, a Marvel Comics superhero team consisting of four young siblings

=== Films ===
- Power (1928 film), a comedy starring William Boyd, Alan Hale and Jacqueline Logan
- Power (1986 film), an American drama
- Power (2013 film), an unreleased Indian film by Rajkumar Santoshi, starring Amitabh Bachchan and Sanjay Dutt
- Power (2014 Telugu film), an Indian Telugu-language film starring Ravi Teja and Hansika Motwani
- Power (2014 Kannada film), an Indian Kannada-language film starring Puneeth Rajkumar and Trisha
- Power (2016 film), an Indian Bengali-language action comedy
- Power (2024 film), a documentary about American police

=== Literature ===
- Power (Fast novel), 1962, by Howard Fast
- Power (Arent), 1937 play by Arthur Arent
- Power (Dear), 2003 play by Nick Dear
- Power: A New Social Analysis, a 1938 sociology book by Bertrand Russell
- "Power", a storyline in the science fiction comedy webtoon series Live with Yourself!

=== Music ===
==== Albums ====
- Power (Alex Newell EP), 2016
- Power (Ana Popović album), 2023
- Power (Barrabás album), 1973
- Power (Boys Noize album), 2009
- Power (Ice-T album), 1988
- Power (Illuminati Hotties album), 2024
- Power (Kansas album), 1986
- Power (Nekrogoblikon EP), 2013
- Power (Q and Not U album), 2004
- Power (Raze album), 1999
- Power (Tower of Power album), 1987
- Power (B.A.P single album), 2012
- Power, by Group 1 Crew
- Power, by Lakeside
- Power, by SSD
- Power, by The Temptations
- Power, by Z-Ro

==== Songs ====
- "Power" (Diljá song), 2023
- "Power" (Ellie Goulding song), 2020
- "Power" (Exo song), 2017
- "Power" (G-Dragon song), 2024
- "Power" (Little Mix song), 2016
- "Power" (Kanye West song), 2010
- "Power" (Helloween song), 1996
- "Power" (KMFDM song), 1996
- "Power" (Sharon O'Neill song), 1984
- "Power", by Hardwell and Kshmr
- "Power", by Bastille from Wild World
- "Power", by Gaurav Dasgupta and Dibyendu Mukharjee from Aa Dekhen Zara, 2009 Indian film
- "Power", by John and Johanna Hall
- "Power", by Kansas from Power
- "Power", by Katy Perry from Witness
- "Power", by Leona Lewis from I Am
- "Power", by Lipps Inc. from Mouth to Mouth
- "Power", by Rainbow from Straight Between the Eyes
- "Power", by Ufo361 and Capital Bra from 808, 2018
- "Power", by Tears For Fears from Elemental

=== Radio ===
- Power 98 (radio station), an English-language radio station in Singapore
- The Power (XM), a satellite radio channel
- Power 105.1, a station in New York City
- Power 89.1, in Cebu City, Philippines, operated by Word Broadcasting Corporation
- 94.1 Power Radio in Daet, Camarines Norte, Philippines
- DXLL-FM in Davao City, Philippines (previously known as Power Radio from 2021 to 2024)

=== Television ===
- Power (TV series), a 2014 drama series on Starz about a New York City illegal drug network
  - Power Universe, an American media franchise comprising Power and its spin-offs
- "Power" (Batwoman), a 2021 episode
- "Power" (Murdoch Mysteries), a 2008 episode
- "Power" (Smallville), a 2009 episode

=== Other uses in arts, entertainment, and media ===
- Girl Got Game, originally Power!!, a manga series 1999–2002
- Power!, a 1985 video game
- Power (game), a play-by-mail space-based game published by Entertainment Concepts Inc.

== People ==
- Power (name), including a list of people and fictional characters with the surname
- Phil Taylor (darts player) (born 1960), English darts champion nicknamed "The Power"
- Oliver "Power" Grant, American producer, streetwear clothing mogul and actor
- Power Twins (disambiguation), several uses

== Places ==
- Power (UTA station), a light rail station in Salt Lake City, US
- Power, Montana, a census-designated place in the U.S.
- Power County, Idaho, also in the U.S.

== Sports ==
- Power (basketball), the 3-on-3 basketball team that plays in the BIG3
- Power (horse), a British thoroughbred
- Pittsburgh Power, an Arena Football League
- Port Adelaide Football Club, nicknamed "Power", an Australian rules football club
- Power F.C., a professional football club based in Koforidua, Ghana
- West Virginia Power, a minor league baseball team

== Other uses ==
- Power (angel), a rank in the Christian angelic hierarchy
- Power, an alternative name for the psychedelic drug 2C-P

== See also ==
- The Power (disambiguation)
- J.D. Power, a global marketing information services firm
- POW-R, a set of commercial dithering and noise shaping algorithms
- Powers (disambiguation)
- Powerful (disambiguation)
