= The Power =

The Power may refer to:

== Films ==
- The Power (1968 film), an American science fiction thriller film based on the novel by Frank M. Robinson
- The Power (1984 film), an American supernatural horror film directed by Stephen Carpenter and Jeffrey Obrow
- The Power (2021 British film), a British horror film written and directed by Corinna Faith
- The Power (2021 Indian film), an Indian action thriller film written and directed by Mahesh Manjrekar

== Literature ==
- The Power (Alderman novel), a 2016 science fiction novel by the British writer Naomi Alderman
- The Power (Robinson novel), a 1956 science fiction novel by American writer Frank M. Robinson
- The Power (Watson novel), a 1987 novel by Ian Watson
- The Power (self-help book), 2010 self-help and spirituality book written by Rhonda Byrne
- "The Power", a story by American writer of science fiction Murray Leinster

== Music ==
- The Power (album), the debut studio album by Australian pop singer Vanessa Amorosi

=== Songs ===
- "The Power" (DJ Fresh song), a single by English producer DJ Fresh, released as the third single from his album Nextlevelism
- "The Power" (Snap! song), song by German Eurodance group Snap!
- "The Power" (Vanessa Amorosi song), the fourth single from Australian recording artist Vanessa Amorosi's debut album
- "The Power" / "Kanashiki Heaven" (Single Version), the 25th major single by the Japanese female idol group Cute
- "The Power", the ninth song from Die Krupps' 1992 album I
- "The Power", the sixth song from Suede's 1994 album Dog Man Star
- "The Power", the second song from Cher's 1998 album Believe
- "The Power", the fifth song from Samantha Fox's 2005 album Angel with an Attitude

== Other ==
- The Power (TV series), a 2023 television series based on the novel by Naomi Alderman
- "The Power" (Studio One), a 1956 television episode
- "The Power" (Regular Show), a 2010 television episode
- Phil "The Power" Taylor (born 1960), English former professional darts player

== See also ==
- "thatPower", a 2013 song by Will.i.am
- Power (disambiguation)
- Shakti: The Power, a 2002 Indian film by Krishna Vamsi
- Parugu, a 2008 Indian Telugu film, Hindi title Veertaa: The Power
- Ek Niranjan, a 2009 Indian Telugu film, Hindi title Ek Hi Raasta: The Power
- Veeramae Vaagai Soodum, a 2022 Indian Tamil film, Hindi title Veera: The Power
