= Habitation One =

1983 novel by Frederick Dunstan

Habitation One is a novel by Frederick Dunstan published in 1983.

== Plot summary ==
Habitation One is a novel in which the action takes place in the building known as Habitation One.

== Reception ==
Dave Langford reviewed Habitation One for White Dwarf #51, and stated that "Dunstan tries to save the final nonsense by ascribing the happy ending to divine intervention, in a cringingly sententious epilogue. Personally I don't set why God should carry the can for the ineptitudes of F Dunstan. A real running sore of a book, this."

== Reviews ==
- Review by Mary Gentle (1984) in Interzone, #8 Summer 1984
- Review by Brian Stableford (1984) in Fantasy Review, July 1984
