= Silent Slaughter =

1985 fictional novel

Silent Slaughter is a novel by Peter Beere published in 1985.

== Plot summary ==
Silent Slaughter is a novel in which Beekay, a cowardly criminal appears in the third volume of the "Trauma 2020" series.

== Reception ==
Dave Langford reviewed Silent Slaughter for White Dwarf #73, and stated that "It succeeds - conjuring up a smell that's a powerful antidote to books and TV series where violence is sanitized and good guys never get hurt, much."

== Reviews ==
- Review by Pauline Morgan (1986) in Fantasy Review, February 1986
