= The Illumination of Alice J. Cunningham =

1987 novel by Lyn Webster

The Illumination of Alice J. Cunningham is a novel by Lyn Webster published in 1987.

== Plot summary ==
The Illumination of Alice J. Cunningham is a novel in which Alice is trapped in a fantasy place created by an uncertain mental state.

== Reception ==
Dave Langford reviewed The Illumination of Alice J. Cunningham for White Dwarf #91, and stated that "A well-written and witty book which I enjoy without deciphering all the allegorical bits. Mea culpa."

== Reviews ==
- Review by Brian Stableford (1986) in Fantasy Review, October 1986
- Review by David V. Barrett (1987) in Vector 140
- Review by Lee Montgomerie (1987) in Interzone, #22 Winter 1987
