= The Princess of Flames =

The Princess of Flames is a novel by Ru Emerson published in 1986.

== Plot summary ==
The Princess of Flames is a novel in which King Sedry and his brother Hyrcan battle the Fegez hordes, who are secretly allied with their sister Elfrid who seeks to revenge against her brothers for overthrowing their father.

== Reception ==
Dave Langford reviewed The Princess of Flames for White Dwarf #89, and stated that "It's as though Emerson had written a novel of semi-historical warfare and was advised to 'fantasy it up a bit'."

== Reviews ==
- Review by Debbie Notkin (1985) in Locus, #299 December 1985
- Review by Charles de Lint (1985) in Fantasy Review, December 1985
