= Slow Birds and Other Stories =

First edition (publ. Gollancz)

Slow Birds and Other Stories is a collection by Ian Watson published in 1985.

== Plot summary ==
Slow Birds and Other Stories is a collection of 11 short stories.

== Reception ==
Dave Langford reviewed Slow Birds and Other Stories for White Dwarf #72, and stated that "strangenesses include inverted, inexplicably expanded, and time-frozen worlds, a vitriolic tale of political physics which plunges Margaret Thatcher below Absolute Zero, and uneasy horror stories. Worth a look."

== Reviews ==
- Review by Chris Morgan (1985) in Fantasy Review, November 1985
- Review by Chris Bailey (1985) in Vector 129
- Review by Dan Chow (1986) in Locus, #300 January 1986
- Review by E. F. Bleiler (1987) in Rod Serling's The Twilight Zone Magazine, April 1987
- Review by Gregory Feeley (1987) in Foundation, #40 Summer 1987
