= The Book of the River =

Novel by Ian Watson

First edition (publ. Gollancz)

The Book of the River is a novel by Ian Watson published in 1984.

== Plot summary ==
The Book of the River is a novel in which Yaleen is one of the women who sail on an immense river which they cannot cross due to a vast worm appearing as the gelatinous Black Current that runs along its full length.

== Reception ==
Dave Langford reviewed The Book of the River for White Dwarf #55, and stated that "Not exactly major Watson, but good-humoured and enormously readable."

== Reviews ==
- Review by Chris Morgan (1984) in Fantasy Review, August 1984
- Review by K. V. Bailey (1984) in Vector 122
- Review by Baird Searles (1986) in Isaac Asimov's Science Fiction Magazine, July 1986
- Review by Don D'Ammassa (1986) in Science Fiction Chronicle, #86 November 1986
