= Low power =

Low power may refer to:

- Radio transmitters that send out relatively little power:
  - QRP operation, using "the minimum power necessary to carry out the desired communications", in amateur radio.
  - Cognitive radio transceivers typically automatically reduce the transmitted power to much less than the power required for reliable one-way broadcasts.
  - Low-power broadcasting that the power of the broadcast is less, i.e. the radio waves are not intended to travel as far as from typical transmitters.
  - Low-power communication device, a radio transmitter used in low-power broadcasting.
- Low-power electronics, the consumption of electric power is deliberately low, e.g. notebook processors.
- Power (statistics), in which low power is due to small sample sizes or poorly designed experiments

== See also ==
- Power (disambiguation)
