= Natfact 7 =

1984 novel by John Tully

Natfact 7 is a novel by John Tully published in 1984.

== Plot summary ==
Natfact 7 is a novel in which in 21st-Century Britain, dissent occurs at Natfact 7 between the Nats forced to work there, and the Qualified Citizens who rule.

== Reception ==
Dave Langford reviewed NatFact 7 for White Dwarf #87, and stated that "Following the old arguments about the justifiability of violence and ultimate worth of revolution, all ends in a state of realistic confusion with just a tiny gain for the forces of good... and Tully instructs you to think of your own moral. Punchy and hard-hitting for 'young adult' SF, but a little too slick for its own good."

== Reviews ==
- Review by Brian Stableford (1985) in Fantasy Review, March 1985
- Review by Andy Sawyer (1987) in Paperback Inferno, #65
