= The Book of Being =

1985 novel by Ian Watson

First edition (publ. Gollancz)

The Book of Being is a novel by Ian Watson published in 1985.

== Plot summary ==
The Book of Being is a novel in which Yaleen dies horribly, goes insane, and then completely rewrites reality.

== Reception ==
Dave Langford reviewed The Book of Being for White Dwarf #68, and stated that "The marathon effort of trilogy-writing is showing: for ages Watson's intellectual gearshift stays in neutral, but crashes into overdrive for the forty pages of Part Three (containing most of the plot). Strangely paced stuff from one of the few SF authors with a truly strange mind."

== Reviews ==
- Review by K. V. Bailey (1985) in Vector 126
- Review by Chris Morgan (1985) in Fantasy Review, July 1985
- Review by Don D'Ammassa (1987) in Science Fiction Chronicle, #89 February 1987
