= Queenmagic, Kingmagic =

Novel by Ian Watson

First edition (publ. Gollancz)

Queenmagic, Kingmagic is a novel by Ian Watson published in 1986.

== Plot summary ==
Queenmagic, Kingmagic is a novel in which the hero and heroine of the story are pawns in a game world involving chess, and travel to worlds of other games.

== Reception ==
Dave Langford reviewed Queenmagic, Kingmagic for White Dwarf #83, and stated that "The expected unexpected finale is very Watsonesque."

== Reviews ==
- Review by Faren Miller (1986) in Locus, #307 August 1986
- Review by Chris Morgan (1986) in Fantasy Review, November 1986
- Review by Martyn Taylor (1986) in Vector 135
- Review by Orson Scott Card (1988) in The Magazine of Fantasy & Science Fiction, October 1988
- Review by Baird Searles (1988) in Isaac Asimov's Science Fiction Magazine, December 1988
- Review by Michael Abbott (2010) in Vector 262 Winter 2010
