= The Book of the Stars =

1984 novel by Ian Watson

First edition (publ. Gollancz)

The Book of the Stars is a novel by Ian Watson published in 1984.

== Plot summary ==
The Book of the Stars is a novel in which the heroine Yaleen dies, and a god called the Worm resurrects her to spy on the electronic Godmind.

== Reception ==
Dave Langford reviewed The Book of the Stars for White Dwarf #61, and stated that "All Watson's books are crammed with ideas [...] but this latest trilogy presents them in uniquely digestible form."

== Reviews ==
- Review by Chris Morgan (1985) in Fantasy Review, April 1985
- Review by Michael R. Collings (1986) in Fantasy Review, May 1986
- Review by Don D'Ammassa (1986) in Science Fiction Chronicle, #84 September 1986
- Review by Tom Easton (1986) in Analog Science Fiction/Science Fact, October 1986
