= Darkwar Trilogy =

Darkwar Trilogy is a novel series written by Glen Cook, consisting of Doomstalker (1985), Warlock (1985), and Ceremony (1986).

== Plot summary ==
Darkwar is a novel series in which a society is explored where witches wield deadly magical power, shaping a fear-driven hierarchy. Set on an alien world, the story follows a huntress turned witch, whose frontier upbringing gives her unparalleled strength. The "silth" witches rule through division and oppression, ensuring their dominance over the non-magical populace. The story examines power, fear, and the inability of the gifted to unite against external threats, as the world faces invasion from the north. Magic is intertwined with technology, where spirits can be commanded but are disrupted by electronic forces, creating a magic-tech conflict.

== Reception ==
John T. Sapienza, Jr. reviewed Doomstalker, Warlock, and Ceremony for Different Worlds magazine and stated that "It's a long story, with a lot of insight into human nature and the way societies work, or fail to work.."

== Reviews ==
Doomstalker:

- Review by Everett F. Bleiler [as by E. F. Bleiler] (1985) in Fantasy Review, August 1985
- Review by Don D'Ammassa (1985) in Science Fiction Chronicle, #75 December 1985

Ceremony:

- Review by Glenn Reed (1986) in Fantasy Review, April 1986
