= Heavy Meta (Nekrogoblikon album) =

Studio album by Nekrogoblikon
- Released: June 2, 2015
- Genre: Melodic death metal, symphonic power metal, folk metal
- Label: Mystery Box
- Producer: Matt Hyde, Nicky Calonne

Nekrogoblikon chronology
Power (EP) (2013)	Heavy Meta (2015)	Welcome to Bonkers (2018)

Heavy Meta is the third studio album by Nekrogoblikon, released on June 2, 2015. The album spawned two music videos, for the songs "We need a Gimmick", and Nekrogoblikon.

== Track listing ==
No.	Title	Length
1.	"The End of Infinity"	3:41
2.	"We've Had Enough"	3:20
3.	"Bring Us More"	2:57
4.	"Snax & Violence"	3:26
5.	"Atlantis"	2:50
6.	"We Need a Gimmick"	4:06
7.	"Full Body Xplosion"	3:57
8.	"Let's Get F****d (with Andrew W.K.)"	4:10
9.	"Mood Swing"	3:11
10.	"Nekrogoblikon"	4:07

== Personnel ==
=== Nekrogoblikon ===
- Nicky "Scorpion" Calonne – lead vocals, keyboards
- Alex "Goldberg" Alereza – guitars, backing vocals
- Joe "Diamond" Nelson – guitars, backing vocals
- Brandon "Fingers" Frenzel – bass
- Eddie "Bready" Trager – drums
- Aaron "Raptor" Minich – keyboards

=== Additional musicians ===
- Andrew W.K. – vocals on "Let's Get F****d"

=== Production ===
- Nekrogoblikon – production
- Matt Hyde – production
- Nicky Calonne – production
- Matt Good – mixing
- Taylor Larson – mastering
