= The Middle Management (Josei Chūkan Kanrishoku) / Gamusha Life / Tsugi no Kado o Magare =

Single by Cute

from the album °Cmaj9
- Released: April 1, 2015 (Japan)
- Genre: J-pop; electropop; EDM
- Label: Zetima

Cute singles chronology
"I Miss You / The Future" (2014)	"The Middle Management (Josei Chūkan Kanrishoku) / Gamusha Life / Tsugi no Kado o Magare" (2015)	"Arigatō (Mugen no Yell) / Arashi o Okosunda Exciting Fight!" (2015)

Music video
- "The Middle Management (Josei Chūkan Kanrishoku)" "Gamusha Life" "Tsugi no Kado o Magare" on YouTube

"The Middle Management (Josei Chūkan Kanrishoku) / Gamusha Life / Tsugi no Kado o Magare" (The Middle Management～女性中間管理職～／我武者LIFE／次の角を曲がれ) is the 27th single by the Japanese female idol group Cute, released in Japan on April 1, 2015. It debuted at number 1 in the daily Oricon singles chart and at number 3 in the weekly Oricon singles chart.

== Outline ==
The album was released in six formats: First Limited Edition A, B, and C, and Normal Edition A, B, and C. All First Limited Editions are CD+DVD, and all Normal Editions are CD-only. All initial limited editions are CD+DVD, and all regular editions are CD only. All discs will include a special advance ticket acceptance flyer for the June 11 (Thu.), 2015 Yokohama Arena concert. All first pressing limited editions include an event lottery serial number card. All the first editions of the regular vinyl include a set of treacle-size photos (Random, Regular disc A: 5 solo photos and 1 group photo in "The Middle Management" costume, Regular disc B: 5 solo photos and 1 group photo in "Gabusha LIFE" costume, Regular disc C: 5 solo photos and 1 group photo in "Turn the Next Corner" costume). ) are enclosed in the package.

Since their debut, °C-ute's songs have been consistently written by TSUNKU♂, but in this album, only the lyrics of the first song are written by TSUNKU♂, and various artists have contributed their songs.

== Background ==
It is a triple-A-sided single.

== Track listing ==
=== Limited Edition A, Regular Edition A ===
CD
No.	Title	Length
1.	"The Middle Management (Josei Chūkan Kanrishoku)" (The Middle Management～女性中間管理職～)	3:23
2.	"Gamusha Life" (我武者LIFE)	4:52
3.	"Tsugi no Kado o Magare" (次の角を曲がれ)	4:20
4.	"The Middle Management (Josei Chūkan Kanrishoku)" (Instrumental)	3:23
5.	"Gamusha Life" (Instrumental)	4:52
6.	"Tsugi no Kado o Magare" (Instrumental)	4:19

DVD (Limited Edition A only)
No.	Title	Length
1.	"The Middle Management (Josei Chūkan Kanrishoku)" (Music Video)	4:16

=== Limited Edition B, Regular Edition B ===
CD
No.	Title	Length
1.	"Gamusha Life" (我武者LIFE)	4:52
2.	"Tsugi no Kado o Magare" (次の角を曲がれ)	4:20
3.	"The Middle Management (Josei Chūkan Kanrishoku)" (The Middle Management～女性中間管理職～)	3:23
4.	"Gamusha Life" (Instrumental)	4:52
5.	"Tsugi no Kado o Magare" (Instrumental)	4:19
6.	"The Middle Management (Josei Chūkan Kanrishoku)" (Instrumental)	3:23

DVD (Limited Edition B only)
No.	Title	Length
1.	"Gamusha Life" (Music Video)	6:23

=== Limited Edition C, Regular Edition C ===
CD
No.	Title	Length
1.	"Tsugi no Kado o Magare" (次の角を曲がれ)	4:20
2.	"The Middle Management (Josei Chūkan Kanrishoku)" (The Middle Management～女性中間管理職～)	3:23
3.	"Gamusha Life" (我武者LIFE)	4:52
4.	"Tsugi no Kado o Magare" (Instrumental)	4:19
5.	"The Middle Management (Josei Chūkan Kanrishoku)" (Instrumental)	3:23
6.	"Gamusha Life" (Instrumental)	4:52

DVD (Limited Edition C only)
No.	Title	Length
1.	"Tsugi no Kado o Magare" (Music Video)	5:13

== Charts ==
Chart (2015)	Peak position
Oricon Daily Singles Chart	1
Oricon Weekly Singles Chart	3
