= °Cmaj9 =

2015 studio album by Cute (Japanese group)

Studio album by Cute
- Released: December 23, 2015 (JP)
- Genre: J-pop; electropop; dance-pop; EDM
- Label: Zetima

Cute chronology
8 Queen of J-pop (2013)	°Cmaj9 (2015)

Singles from ⑧ Queen of J-POP
- 1. "Tokai no Hitorigurashi / Aitte Motto Zanshin" Released: November 6, 2013; 2. "Kokoro no Sakebi o Uta ni Shitemita / Love Take It All" Released: March 5, 2014; 3. "The Power / Kanashiki Heaven (Single Version)" Released: July 16, 2014; 4. "I Miss You / The Future" Released: November 19, 2014; 5. "The Middle Management (Josei Chūkan Kanrishoku) / Gamusha Life / Tsugi no Kado o Magare" Released: April 1, 2015

Music video
- Cute "Iron Heart" on YouTube

°Cmaj9 (°Cmaj9, pronounced "C Major Ninth") is the ninth and final studio album by Cute. It was released on December 23, 2015, on the label Zetima.

== Release ==
The album was released in 3 versions: Regular Edition, Limited Edition A (CD+DVD), and Limited Edition B (CD+Blu-ray). The limited editions contained an additional DVD or Blu-ray disc, while the regular edition had one additional (20th) track on the CD.

== Reception ==
The album debuted at number eight in the Japanese Oricon weekly albums chart.

== Track listing ==
CD
No.	Title	Notes	Length
1.	"°Cmaj9"	Instrumental track	0:35
2.	"Iron Heart"	New song	4:23
3.	"Otoko to Onna to Forever" (男と女とForever)	New song	3:37
4.	"Jōnetsu Ecstasy (情熱エクスタシー, Jōnetsu Ekusutashī)"	New song	5:01
5.	"Digitalic 0 (Love)"	New song	3:23
6.	"Urayanjau" (羨んじゃう)	New song	4:04
7.	"Yokaze no Message" (夜風のMessage)	New song	4:43
8.	"Tokai no Hitorigurashi" (都会の一人暮らし)	First A-side of the 23rd single	4:26
9.	"Aitte Motto Zanshin" (愛ってもっと斬新)	Second A-side of the 23rd single	3:53
10.	"Kokoro no Sakebi o Uta ni Shitemita" (心の叫びを歌にしてみた)	First A-side of the 24th single	3:49
11.	"Love Take It All" (Love take it all)	Second A-side of the 24th single	4:04
12.	"The Power"	First A-side of the 25th single	4:01
13.	"Kanashiki Heaven (Single Version)" (悲しきヘブン (Single Version))	Second A-side of the 25th single	4:01
14.	"I Miss You"	First A-side of the 26th single	3:24
15.	"The Future"	Second A-side of the 26th single	3:24
16.	"The Middle Management (Josei Chûkan Kanrishoku)" (The Middle Management 〜女性中間管理職〜)	First A-side of the 27th single	3:23
17.	"Tsugi no Kado o Magare" (次の角を曲がれ)	Third A-side of the 27th single	4:20
18.	"Gamusha Life" (我武者LIFE)	Second A-side of the 27th single	4:52
19.	"°Cmaj9 (reprise)"	Instrumental track	0:32

Regular Edition bonus track
No.	Title	Notes	Length
20.	"Arigatō (Mugen no Yell) (Tofubeats Remix)" (ありがとう～無限のエール～（Tofubeats Remix）)	Remix of the second A-side of the 28th single	4:24

Limited Edition A DVD ("Naruchika 2015 °C-ute 5/19 Ebisu Liquid Room" concert)
No.	Title	Length
1.	"Opening"
2.	"Kacchoii Uta" (かっちょ良い歌)
3.	"Love Take It All"
4.	"MC" (MC)
5.	"The Middle Management (Josei Chūkan Kanrishoku)" (The Middle Management ～女性中間管理職～)
6.	"The Future"
7.	"The Power"
8.	"MC"
9.	"Campus Life (Umarete Kite Yokatta)" (キャンパスライフ～生まれて来てよかった～)
10.	"Sakura Chirari" (桜チラリ)
11.	"Wakaretakunai..." (別れたくない...)
12.	"MC"
13.	"Tsugi no Kado o Magare" (次の角を曲がれ)
14.	"Please, Love Me More!"
15.	"Namida no Iro" (涙の色)
16.	"Midnight Temptation"
17.	"Ai tte Motto Zanshin" (愛ってもっと斬新)
18.	"Tokaikko Junjō" (都会っ子 純情)
19.	"Kiss Me Aishiteru" (Kiss me 愛してる)
20.	"Dance de Bakōn!" (Danceでバコーン!)
21.	"MC"
22.	"Bokura no Kagayaki" (僕らの輝き)
23.	"Chō Wonderful!" (超WONDERFUL!)
24.	"MC"
25.	"Shines (Encore)"

Limited B Edition Blu-ray Disc
No.	Title	Length
1.	"Iron Heart (Music Video)" (アイアンハート (Aian Hāto) (Music Video))
2.	"Arigatō (Mugen no Yell) (Cute Ver.)" (ありがとう～無限のエール～（°C-ute Ver.）)
3.	"Arashi o Okosunda Exciting Fight! (Cute Ver.)" (嵐を起こすんだExciting Fight!（°C-ute Ver.）)

== Charts ==
Chart (2015)	Peak position
Japan (Oricon Daily Albums Chart)	6
Japan (Oricon Weekly Albums Chart)	8
