= Converts (novel) =

1984 novel by Ian Watson

First edition (publ. Panther Books)

Converts is a novel by Ian Watson published in 1984.

== Plot summary ==
Converts is a novel in which characters become artificially transformed into superhumans.

== Reception ==
Dave Langford reviewed Converts for White Dwarf magazine, stating that "You keep alternating between smiles and groans as you read..."

== Reviews ==
- Review by Debbie Notkin (1984) in Locus, #283 August 1984
- Review by Martyn Taylor (1985) in Vector 124/125
- Review by Darrell Schweitzer (1986) in Thrust, #24, Summer 1986
