= Tokai no Hitorigurashi / Aitte Motto Zanshin =

- Limited Edition A cover

Single by Cute

from the album °Cmaj9
- B-side: "Please, Love Me More!" (Regular A, Limited A, B, C Ed.); "Yūwaku no Kyūjitsu" (Regular B, Limited D)
- Released: November 6, 2013 (Japan)
- Genre: J-pop; EDM
- Label: Zetima
- Songwriter: Tsunku
- Producer: Tsunku

Cute singles chronology
"Kanashiki Amefuri / Adam to Eve no Dilemma" (2013)	"Tokai no Hitorigurashi / Aitte Motto Zanshin" (2013)	"Kokoro no Sakebi o Uta ni Shitemita / Love Take It All" (2014)

Music videos
- Cute "Tokai no Hitorigurashi" (MV) on YouTube
- Cute "Aitte Motto Zanshin" (MV) on YouTube

"Tokai no Hitorigurashi / Aitte Motto Zanshin" (都会の一人暮らし／愛ってもっと斬新) is the 23rd major single by the Japanese female idol group Cute. It is set to be released in Japan on November 6, 2013.

== Background ==
The CD single will be released in six versions: Limited Editions A, B, C, D and Regular Editions A, B. Both Regular Editions and the Limited Edition D are CD-only. The limited editions A, B, and C come with a DVD containing music videos, etc. All the limited editions are shipped sealed and include a serial-numbered entry card for the lottery to win a ticket to one of the single's launch events.

== Track listing ==
=== Regular Edition A, Limited Editions A, B, C ===
CD
No.	Title	Length
1.	"Tokai no Hitorigurashi" (都会の一人暮らし)
2.	"Aitte Motto Zanshin" (愛ってもっと斬新)
3.	"Please, Love Me More!" (Please, love me more!)
4.	"Tokai no Hitorigurashi (Instrumental)" (都会の一人暮らし（Instrumental）)
5.	"Aitte Motto Zanshin (Instrumental)" (愛ってもっと斬新（Instrumental）)

Limited Edition A DVD
No.	Title	Length
1.	"Tokai no Hitorigurashi (Music Video)" (都会の一人暮らし（Music Video）)	04:35
2.	"Tokai no Hitorigurashi (Dance Shot Ver.)" (都会の一人暮らし（Dance Shot Ver.）)	04:35

Limited Edition B DVD
No.	Title	Length
1.	"Aitte Motto Zanshin (Music Video)" (愛ってもっと斬新（Music Video）)	04:01
2.	"Aitte Motto Zanshin (Dance Shot Ver.)" (愛ってもっと斬新（Dance Shot Ver.）)	04:01

Limited Edition C DVD
No.	Title	Length
1.	"Tokai no Hitorigurashi (Close-up Ver.)" (都会の一人暮らし（Close-up Ver.）)	04:32
2.	"Aitte Motto Zanshin (Close-up Ver.)" (愛ってもっと斬新（Close-up Ver.）)	03:56
3.	"Tokai no Hitorigurashi / Aitte Motto Zanshin (Jacket & MV Making-of and Off-shot Video)" (都会の一人暮らし/愛ってもっと斬新（ジャケット・MV撮影メイキング＆オフショット映像）)	20:33

=== Regular Edition B, Limited Edition D ===
CD
No.	Title	Length
1.	"Tokai no Hitorigurashi" (都会の一人暮らし)
2.	"Aitte Motto Zanshin" (愛ってもっと斬新)
3.	"Yūwaku no Kyūjitsu" (誘惑の休日)
4.	"Tokai no Hitorigurashi (Instrumental)" (都会の一人暮らし（Instrumental）)
5.	"Aitte Motto Zanshin (Instrumental)" (愛ってもっと斬新（Instrumental）)

=== Bonus ===
Sealed into all the limited editions:

- Event ticket lottery card with a serial number

== Charts ==
Chart (2013)	Peak position
Oricon Weekly Singles Chart	3
