= The Jonah Kit =

1975 novel by Ian Watson

- First edition
- Author: Ian Watson
- Language: English
- Genre: Science fiction
- Publisher: Victor Gollancz Ltd
- Publication date: 1975
- Publication place: United Kingdom
- Pages: 221
- ISBN: 0-575-01938-7
- OCLC: 2129303

The Jonah Kit is a 1975 science fiction novel by English writer Ian Watson. In 1977, The Jonah Kit won the BSFA Award for Best Novel.
