= Ian Watson (author) =

British science fiction writer (1943–2026)

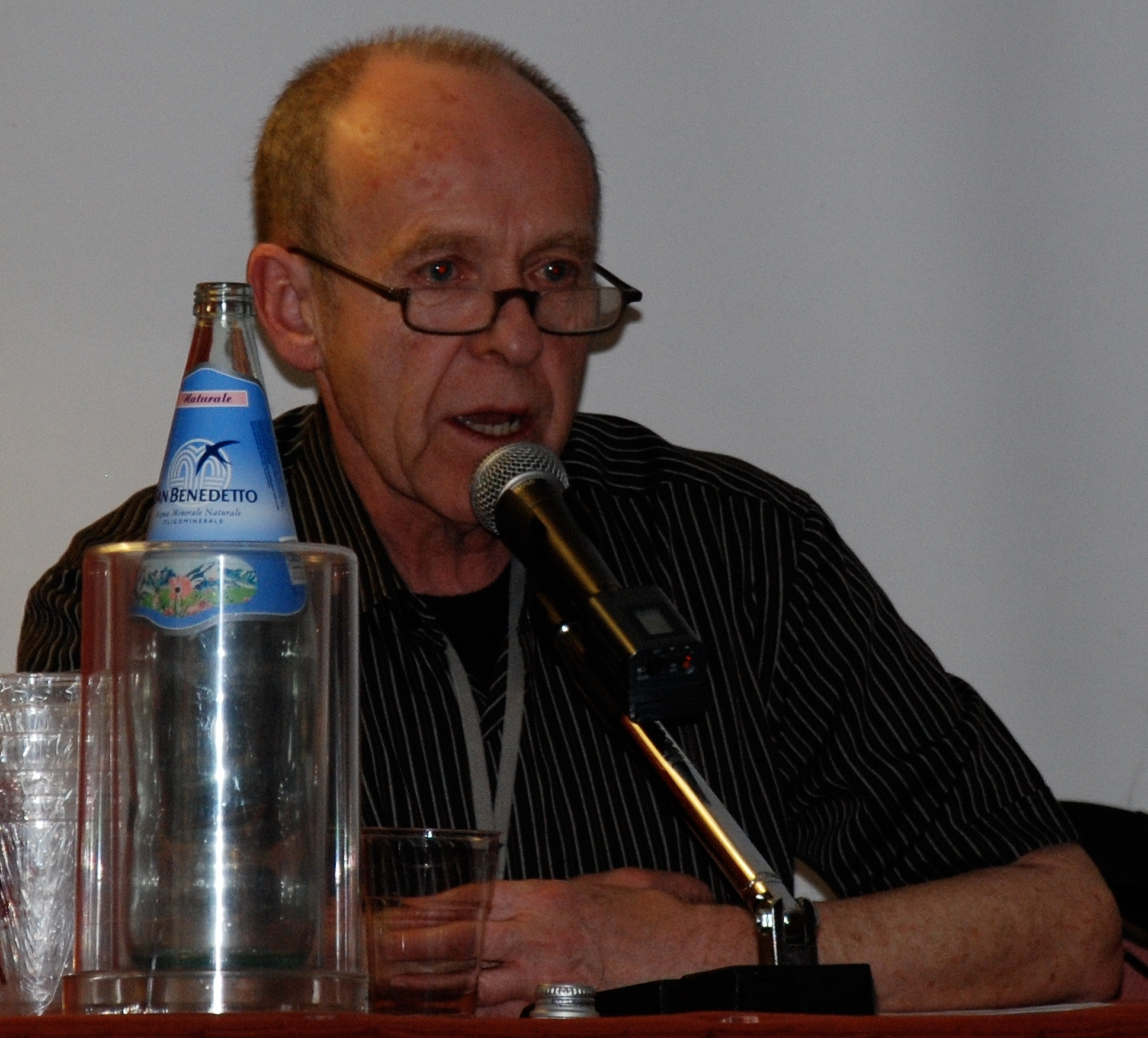
- Watson in 2009
- Born: 20 April 1943; St Albans, England
- Died: 13 April 2026 (aged 82); Gijón, Spain
- Occupations: Author, writer
- Writing career
- Language: English
- Genre: Science fiction

Ian Watson (20 April 1943 – 13 April 2026) was a British science fiction writer who lived in Gijón, Spain.

== Life and career ==
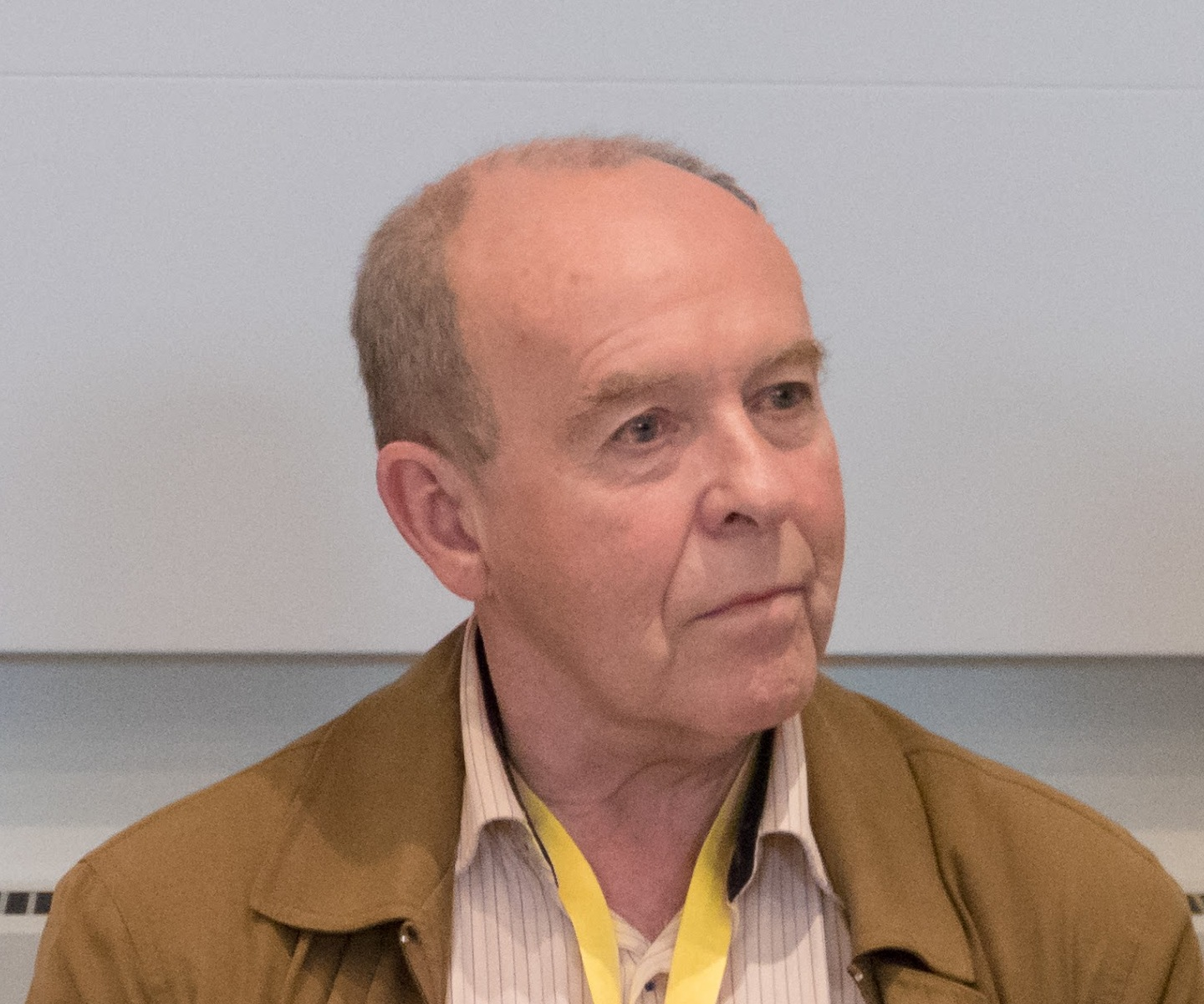
Watson at Worldcon 75 in Helsinki 2017

Ian Watson was born in St Albans, England, on 20 April 1943. In 1959, Watson worked as an accounts clerk at Runciman's, a Newcastle shipping company. The experience was not particularly satisfying.

He graduated in English Literature from Balliol College, Oxford, in 1963. In 1965, he earned a research degree in English and French 19th-century literature.

Watson was an English lecturer at University College Dar es Salaam in Tanzania 1965–67, and at two universities in Tokyo 1967–70. He taught Future Studies at the Birmingham Polytechnic from 1970 to 1976. After 1976, he devoted himself to his career as a professional writer.

Watson was a prolific writer, who wrote more than two dozen novels, among them Miracle Visitors, God's World, The Jonah Kit and The Flies of Memory, as well as many collections of short stories. His first novel, The Embedding, winner of the Prix Apollo in 1975, is unusual for being based on ideas from generative grammar; the title refers to the process of center embedding. In 1977, The Jonah Kit won the BSFA Award for Best Novel.

During 1980, Watson and Michael Bishop wrote the first transatlantic SF novel collaboration, Under Heaven's Bridge, using typewriters and postal services.

In 1989, Watson made an extended appearance on television in Channel 4's After Dark series alongside Buzz Aldrin and Whitley Strieber among others.

Watson also wrote a series of novels relating to the Warhammer 40,000 line of games: Space Marine, and the Inquisition War trilogy of Inquisitor, Harlequin and Chaos Child (republished in 2002 by The Black Library, with Inquisitor retitled Draco). Other stories were published in US magazine Weird Tales, the Canadian anthology Lust For Life, New Writings in the Fantastic, the Mammoth Book of Best New Erotica volume 7, and in a few more books. Some of these stories have been translated into non-English languages. He is also credited as author of the screen story for the motion picture A.I. Artificial Intelligence.

A collaboration with Italian surrealist writer Roberto Quaglia produced the book The Beloved of My Beloved, launched during April 2009 during Eastercon. The Waters of Destiny series, co-written with Andy West, was published in 2012.

Watson died in Gijón on 13 April 2026, at the age of 82.

== Bibliography ==
=== Novels ===
- The Embedding. London: Gollancz. 1973.
- The Jonah Kit. London: Gollancz. 1975.
- Orgasmachine. Paris: Editions Champ Libre, 1976.
- The Martian Inca. London: Gollancz, 1977. ISBN 0-575-02218-3
- Alien Embassy. London: Gollancz, 1977. ISBN 0-575-02336-8
- Miracle Visitors. London: Gollancz, 1978. ISBN 0-575-02474-7
- God's World. London, Gollancz, 1979. ISBN 0-575-02683-9
- The Gardens of Delight. London: Gollancz, 1980. ISBN 0-575-02819-X
- Deathhunter. London: Gollancz, 1981. ISBN 0-575-03023-2
- Under Heaven's Bridge, with Michael Bishop. London: Gollancz, 1982. ISBN 0-575-02927-7
- Chekhov's Journey. London: Gollancz, 1983. ISBN 0-575-03213-8
- Converts. London: Granada, 1984 (paper). ISBN 0-586-05895-8
- The Books of the Black Current:
  - The Book of the River. London: Gollancz, 1984. ISBN 0-575-03396-7
  - The Book of the Stars. London: Gollancz, 1984. ISBN 0-575-03508-0
  - The Book of Being. London: Gollancz, 1985. ISBN 0-575-03596-X
  - Yaleen, omnibus edition. Dallas, TX: BenBella Books, 2004 ISBN 1-932100-24-5
- Queenmagic, Kingmagic. London: Gollancz, 1986. ISBN 0-575-03883-7
- The Power. London: Headline, 1987. ISBN 0-7472-0031-9
- Whores of Babylon. London: Paladin, 1988 (paper). ISBN 0-586-08773-7
- Meat. London: Headline, 1988. ISBN 0-7472-3130-3
- The Fire Worm. London: Gollancz, 1988. ISBN 0-575-04300-8
- The Flies of Memory. London: Gollancz, 1990. ISBN 0-575-04873-5
- The Books of Mana:
  - Lucky's Harvest. London: Gollancz, 1993. ISBN 0-575-05423-9
  - The Fallen Moon. London: Gollancz, 1994. ISBN 0-575-05424-7
- Hard Questions. London: Gollancz, 1996. ISBN 0-575-06189-8
- Oracle. London: Gollancz, 1997. ISBN 0-575-06487-0
- Mockymen. Urbana, IL: Golden Gryphon Press, 2003. ISBN 1-930846-21-5
- Orgasmachine. Alconbury Weston: NewCon Press, 2010. ISBN 978-1-907069-14-7
- The Waters of Destiny (with Andy West)
  - Assassins. Palabaristas Press, 2012
  - Tongue of Knowledge. Palabaristas Press, 2012
  - Death Overflows. Palabaristas Press, 2012

Warhammer 40,000

- The Inquisition War trilogy:
  - Inquisitor (vt 2002 Draco). Brighton: GW Books, 1990 (paper). ISBN 1-872372-29-5
  - Harlequin. London: Boxtree, 1994. ISBN 0-7522-0965-5
  - Chaos Child. London: Boxtree, 1995. ISBN 0-7522-0621-4
- Space Marine. London: Boxtree, 1993 (paper). ISBN 1-85283-840-X
- Shorts:
  - The Alien Beast Within. GW Books, 1990. ISBN 0743411714

=== Short fiction ===
Collections

- The Very Slow Time Machine. London: Gollancz, 1979. ISBN 0-575-02582-4
- Sunstroke and Other Stories. London: Gollancz, 1982. ISBN 0-575-03138-7
- Slow Birds and Other Stories. London: Gollancz, 1985. ISBN 0-575-03675-3
- The Book of Ian Watson. Willimantic: Mark V. Zeising, 1985. ISBN 0-9612970-3-4
- Evil Water and Other Stories. London: Gollancz, 1987. ISBN 0-575-03953-1
- Salvage Rites and Other Stories. London: Gollancz, 1989. ISBN 0-575-04447-0
- Stalin's Teardrops. London: Gollancz, 1991. ISBN 0-575-04942-1
- The Coming of Vertumnus. London: Gollancz, 1994. ISBN 0-575-05766-1
- The Great Escape. Urbana, IL: Golden Gryphon Press, 2002. ISBN 1-930846-09-6
- The Butterflies of Memory. Harrogate: PS Publishing, 2006. ISBN 1-904619-49-5
- Saving for a Sunny Day. Alconbury Weston: NewCon Press, 2012. ISBN 978-1-907069-38-3
- The 1000 Year Reich. NewCon Press, 2016. ISBN 978-1-910935-06-4

Stories

Title	Year	First published	Reprinted/collected	Notes
Blair's War	2013	"Blair's War". Asimov's Science Fiction. 37 (7): 35–42. July 2013.		
Breakfast in bed	2015	"Breakfast in bed". Analog Science Fiction and Fact. 135 (7&8): 71–75. July–August 2015.		

=== Poetry ===
List of poems

Title	Year	First published	Reprinted/collected
Catalogue note by the artist	2013	"Catalogue note by the artist". Asimov's Science Fiction. 37 (12): 23. December 2013.	
