= Evil Water and Other Stories =

First edition (publ. Gollancz)

Evil Water and Other Stories is a collection by Ian Watson published in 1987.

== Plot summary ==
Evil Water and Other Stories is a collection of 10 science fiction, fantasy, and horror stories.

== Reception ==
Dave Langford reviewed Evil Water for White Dwarf #88, and stated that "This collection is a shade less substantial than previous ones, but still offers fun and intellectual fireworks: alien parasites, failed timegates, transatlantic sponsored swimming, Greenham Common allegory, and an enjoyably nasty sense of humour throughout."

== Reviews ==
- Review by David V. Barrett (1987) in Vector 138
- Review by L. J. Hurst (1987) in Vector 138
- Review by Lee Montgomerie (1987) in Interzone, #21 Autumn 1987
- Review by Gregory Feeley (1987) in Foundation, #40 Summer 1987
