= Deathhunter =

1981 novel by Ian Watson

- Author: Ian Watson
- Language: English
- Publisher: Gollancz
- Publication date: 1981

Deathhunter is a 1981 science fiction novel by British writer Ian Watson. It was first published in London by Gollancz in October 1981.

== Publication history ==
Deathhunter was published by Gollancz in hardcover in 1981 (ISBN 0-575-03023-2). A Science Fiction Book Club edition followed in 1982, as did a paperback edition from Corgi Books. The novel was first published in the United States by St. Martin's Press in 1986, with a paperback edition following in 1987.

The novel was later reissued as an ebook by Gateway in 2011.

A French translation, La mort en cage, appeared in 1984. The novel was translated into Polish by Michał Wroczyński as Łowca śmierci and published by Alfa in 1987 as volume 9 of the Biblioteka Fantastyki series.

== Plot ==
The novel is set in the aftermath of a disaster in a society whose surviving regions have largely eliminated violence and conflict, but also art. Traditional belief in an afterlife has disappeared, and elderly and terminally ill people undergo euthanasia in institutions known as Houses of Death, where they are counselled by guides who perform a priest-like role.

The protagonist, Jim Todhunter, is one such guide. Despite official opposition, he conducts research into the nature of death. When he is assigned to counsel a murderer—an exceptional figure in this ostensibly peaceful society—he becomes associated with Nathan Weinberger, an obsessive former guide who shares his interest in death.

== Reception ==
Contemporary reviews of the novel appeared in several science-fiction publications, including reviews by Nick Lowe in Vector (1981), Patrick Parrinder in Science Fiction & Fantasy Book Review (1982), David Langford in Science Fiction Review (1982), Thomas A. Easton in Analog Science Fiction/Science Fact (1987), and Don D'Ammassa in Science Fiction Chronicle (1987). Małgorzata Skórska reviewed the Polish translation in Fantastyka in 1988.

Publishers Weekly described the novel as "intriguing and intricately worked out" and considered it one of Watson's better novels. The review noted a characteristic feature of Watson's fiction in the contrast between the novel's initially peaceful, apparently utopian society and the more complex and disturbing reality gradually revealed beneath it.

== Awards ==
The novel placed 26th in the Best Science Fiction Novel category of the 1982 Locus Poll Award.
