= Kokoro no Sakebi o Uta ni Shitemita / Love Take It All =

Single by Cute

from the album °Cmaj9
- Released: March 5, 2014 (Japan)
- Genre: J-pop
- Label: Zetima
- Songwriter: Tsunku
- Producer: Tsunku

Cute singles chronology
"Tokai no Hitorigurashi / Aitte Motto Zanshin" (2013)	"Kokoro no Sakebi o Uta ni Shitemita / Love Take It All" (2014)	"The Power / Kanashiki Heaven (Single Version)" (2014)

Music videos
- "Kokoro no Sakebi o Uta ni Shitemita" on YouTube
- "Love Take It All" on YouTube

"Kokoro no Sakebi o Uta ni Shitemita / Love Take It All" (心の叫びを歌にしてみた／Love take it all) is the 24th major single by the Japanese female idol group Cute. It was released in Japan on March 5, 2014.

== Background ==
The CD single was released in five versions: Limited Editions A, B, and C; and Regular Editions A and B. Both Regular Editions were CD-only. All of the limited editions came with a DVD containing music videos, and included a serial-numbered entry card for the lottery to win a ticket to one of the single's launch events. The first press of both regular editions included a photocard.

== Track listing ==
CD (all editions)
No.	Title	Length
1.	"Kokoro no Sakebi o Uta ni Shitemita" (心の叫びを歌にしてみた)
2.	"Love Take It All" (Love take it all)
3.	"Kokoro no Sakebi o Uta ni Shitemita (Instrumental)" (心の叫びを歌にしてみた <Instrumental>)
4.	"Love Take It All (Instrumental)" (Love take it all <Instrumental>)

Limited Edition A DVD
No.	Title	Length
1.	"Kokoro no Sakebi o Uta ni Shitemita (Music Video)" (心の叫びを歌にしてみた（Music Video）)	04:03
2.	"Kokoro no Sakebi o Uta ni Shitemita (Jacket / MV Satsuei Making & Off-shot Eizō)" (心の叫びを歌にしてみた（ジャケット・MV撮影メイキング&オフショット映像） "Jacket / music video making-of & off-shot video")	13:21

Limited Edition B DVD
No.	Title	Length
1.	"Love Take It All (Music Video)" (Love take it all（Music Video）)	04:05
2.	"Love Take It All (Jacket / MV Satsuei Making & Off-shot Eizō)" (Love take it all（ジャケット・MV撮影メイキング&オフショット映像） "Jacket / music video making-of & off-shot video")	14:27

Limited Edition C DVD
No.	Title	Length
1.	"Kokoro no Sakebi o Uta ni Shitemita (Dance Shot Ver.)" (心の叫びを歌にしてみた（Dance Shot Ver.）)	03:56
2.	"Love Take It All (Dance Shot Ver.)" (Love take it all（Dance Shot Ver.）)	04:05
3.	"Kokoro no Sakebi o Uta ni Shitemita (Street Ver.)" (心の叫びを歌にしてみた（Street Ver.）)	03:56
4.	"Love Take It All (Close-up and Free Dance Ver.)" (Love take it all（Close-up and Free Dance Ver.）)	04:14

=== Bonus ===
- Sealed into all the limited editions:
  - Event ticket lottery card with a serial number
- Sealed into the first press of all the regular editions:
  - Photocard, random out of several types (Regular Edition A: 1 group photo and 5 solo member photos in the costumes for "Kokoro no Sakebi o Uta ni Shitemita", Regular Edition B: 1 group photo and 5 solo member photos in the costumes for "Love Take It All")

== Charts ==
Chart (2014)	Peak position
Oricon Daily Singles Chart	1
Oricon Weekly Singles Chart	2
Billboard Japan Hot 100	21
