= I Miss You / The Future =

Single by Cute

from the album °Cmaj9
- Released: November 19, 2014 (Japan)
- Genre: J-pop; electropop; dance-pop
- Label: Zetima
- Songwriter: Tsunku
- Producer: Tsunku

Cute singles chronology
"The Power / Kanashiki Heaven (Single Version)" (2014)	"I Miss You / The Future" (2014)	"The Middle Management (Josei Chūkan Kanrishoku) / Gamusha Life / Tsugi no Kado o Magare" (2015)

Music videos
- "I Miss You" on YouTube
- "The Future" on YouTube

"I Miss You" / "The Future" is the 26th major double A-side single by the Japanese female idol group Cute. It was released in Japan on November 19, 2014.

== Background ==
The CD single was released in six versions: Limited Editions A, B, C, D and Regular Editions A, B. Both regular editions are CD-only. All the limited editions come with a DVD containing music videos, etc. and include a serial-numbered entry card for the lottery to win a ticket to one of the single's launch events. The first print of both regular editions comes with a photocard.

== Track listing ==
=== Limited Editions A, C and Regular Edition A ===
CD
No.	Title	Length
1.	"I Miss You" (I miss you)	3:25
2.	"The Future" (THE FUTURE)	3:24
3.	"I Miss You (Instrumental)"	3:25
4.	"The Future (Instrumental)"	3:25

Limited Edition A DVD
No.	Title	Length
1.	"I Miss You (Music Video)"	4:10

Limited Edition C DVD
No.	Title	Length
1.	"I Miss You (Dance Shot Ver.)"	4:31
2.	"I Miss You (Making-of)" (I miss you （メイキング映像）)	8:18

=== Limited Editions B, D and Regular Edition B ===
CD
No.	Title	Length
1.	"The Future" (THE FUTURE)	3:25
2.	"I Miss You" (I miss you)	3:25
3.	"The Future (Instrumental)"	3:24
4.	"I Miss You (Instrumental)"	3:25

Limited Edition B DVD
No.	Title	Length
1.	"The Future (Music Video)"	4:14

Limited Edition D DVD
No.	Title	Length
1.	"The Future (Dance Shot Ver.)"	3:33
2.	"The Future (Making-of)" (THE FUTURE （メイキング映像）)	8:10

=== Bonus ===
- Sealed into all the limited editions:
  - Event ticket lottery card with a serial number
- Sealed into the first press of all the regular editions:
  - Photocard, random out several types (Regular Edition A: 1 group photo and 5 solo member photos in the costumes for "I Miss You", Regular Edition B: 1 group photo and 5 solo member photos in the costumes for "The Future")

== Charts ==
Chart (2014)	Peak position
Oricon Weekly Singles Chart	4
