= Nekrogoblikon =

American melodic death metal band

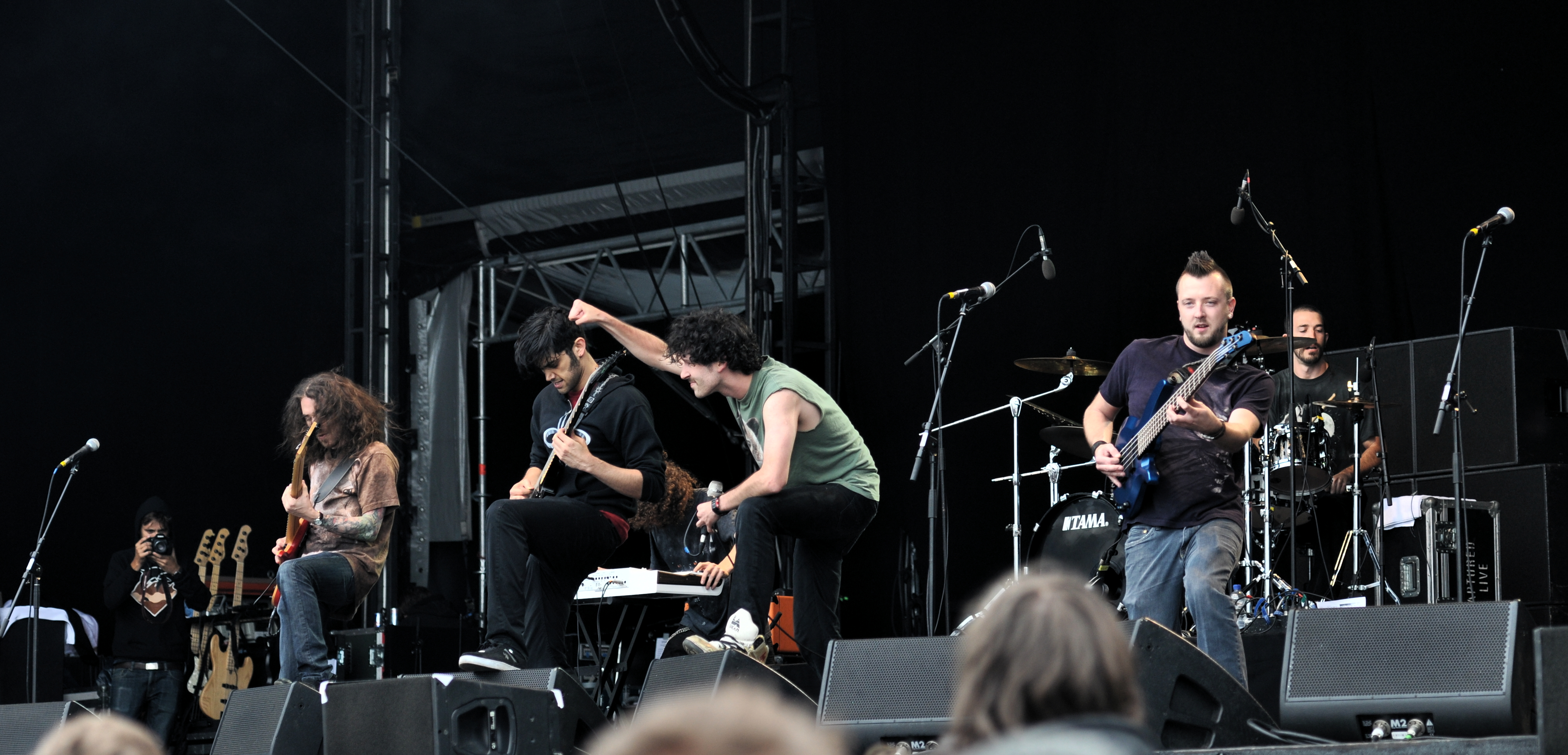
- Nekrogoblikon at Rock am Ring in June 2013.

Background information
- Origin: Santa Barbara, California, U.S.
- Genres: Melodic death metal; folk metal; comedy metal; symphonic power metal; death metal (early)
- Years active: 2006–present
- Label: Mystery Box
- Members: Alex Alereza; Aaron Minich; Dave Rispoli; Dickie Allen; Eric W. Brown; Grady J. Welch; Joe Nelson
- Past members: Nicky Calonne; Tim Lyakhovetskiy; Eddie Trager; Aaron Van Zutphen; Alex Duddy; Anthony DeLorenzi; Ashleigh Carracino; Austin Nickel; Brandon Frenzel; Bryan Kaye; Jason Kaye; Spencer Bartz
- Website: nekrogoblikon.bandcamp.com

Nekrogoblikon is an American melodic death metal band based in Los Angeles, California. The group was formed in 2006 by Nicky Calonne and Tim Lyakhovetskiy. Lead guitarist Alex Alereza remains the member with the longest active tenure. Nekrogoblikon has released five full-length albums, Goblin Island, Stench, Heavy Meta, Welcome to Bonkers and The Fundamental Slimes and Humours, and two EP, Power and The Boiling Sea. The band's music centers on a goblin theme, with a goblin mascot named John Goblikon who also runs the podcast Right Now with John Goblikon.

== History ==
=== Formation and Goblin Island (2006–2010) ===
Nekrogoblikon was formed in 2006 by Nicky Calonne and Tim Lyakhovetskiy in Palo Alto, California. The two of them recorded Nekrogoblikon's first album Goblin Island in Lyakhovetskiy's basement. On his return to school at the University of California, Santa Barbara, Lyakhovetskiy found Ashleigh Carracino, Alex Duddy, Spencer Bartz, Alex Alereza, and Austin Nickel to form the rest of the band. The group played eleven shows before Bartz moved to Japan and was replaced by Eddie Trager.

=== Stench (2011–2012) ===
On July 19, 2011, the band released Stench. Stench was reviewed positively by "Pop and Hiss", the Los Angeles Times music blog, which praised its technical proficiency and songwriting, and described its inclusion of electronic elements as working "surprisingly well." Metal Sucks also praised the album with a 4.5/5 rating, describing it as more professional than Goblin Island, and complimenting its technicality. Blistering gave the album a 9/10 rating, calling it "fun and entertaining."

=== John Goblikon and No One Survives music video (2012) ===
In September 2012, the band released a music video for "No One Survives," directed by Brandon Dermer. Before the video's release, the theme of goblin music was just a comical idea, and the band had never considered dressing up or including a goblin character on stage. At that time, Dermer, an assistant at a film production and management agency, had some experience making music videos with comic musician and actor Jon Lajoie. Dermer approached the band as a fan who was determined to help create a music video. The band initially rejected the idea and said they would not dress up and be compared to Gwar. Dermer returned to the band with a more fleshed-out character and vision that the band agreed to on the understanding that they had no money to finance anything related to the video or the character. Dermer reached out to "around 80 brands and got three to pay for it," which included a Goblin costume and mask created by Monster Effects.

The video is the first appearance of the band's goblin mascot, John Goblikon, created by Dermer and portrayed by actor-comedian Dave Rispoli. The video depicts Goblikon working at a sales and marketing firm. A coworker (played by Kayden Kross) invites him to her birthday party at a bar, where John attends, hoping to win her affection. His excitement quickly turns to depression, thanks to the Birthday girl already having a date at the party. The bartender (played by the aforementioned Jon Lajoie) proceeds to overserve John; we learn that he is not shy in his dance moves. The scene ends with John violently mauling his coworker's date in the parking lot and he is optimistic that she will still give him a shot despite the murder. The video became viral and was viewed more than 1.5 million times in the first three months.

Dermer stated that he didn't expect much to come of the video. Still, it was on the first page of Reddit after a few days, and then it went even more viral when DJ/Producer Diplo discovered it organically and posted the one-word tweet "Nekrogoblikon." Dermer eventually ended up working with Diplo on various projects and music videos.

During interviews, the band members claimed that John Goblikon is a real goblin and different from the one credited in the music video. They explained that Dave Rispoli, the comedy actor and writer credited in the music video, met John on LinkedIn, and Dave facilitated the introduction between the band and the goblin. His first appearances with the band were as hype-goblin and go-go dancer. In later interviews, the members fully embrace the lore of John Goblikon as a real goblin and full-fledged band member.

=== Power (2013) ===
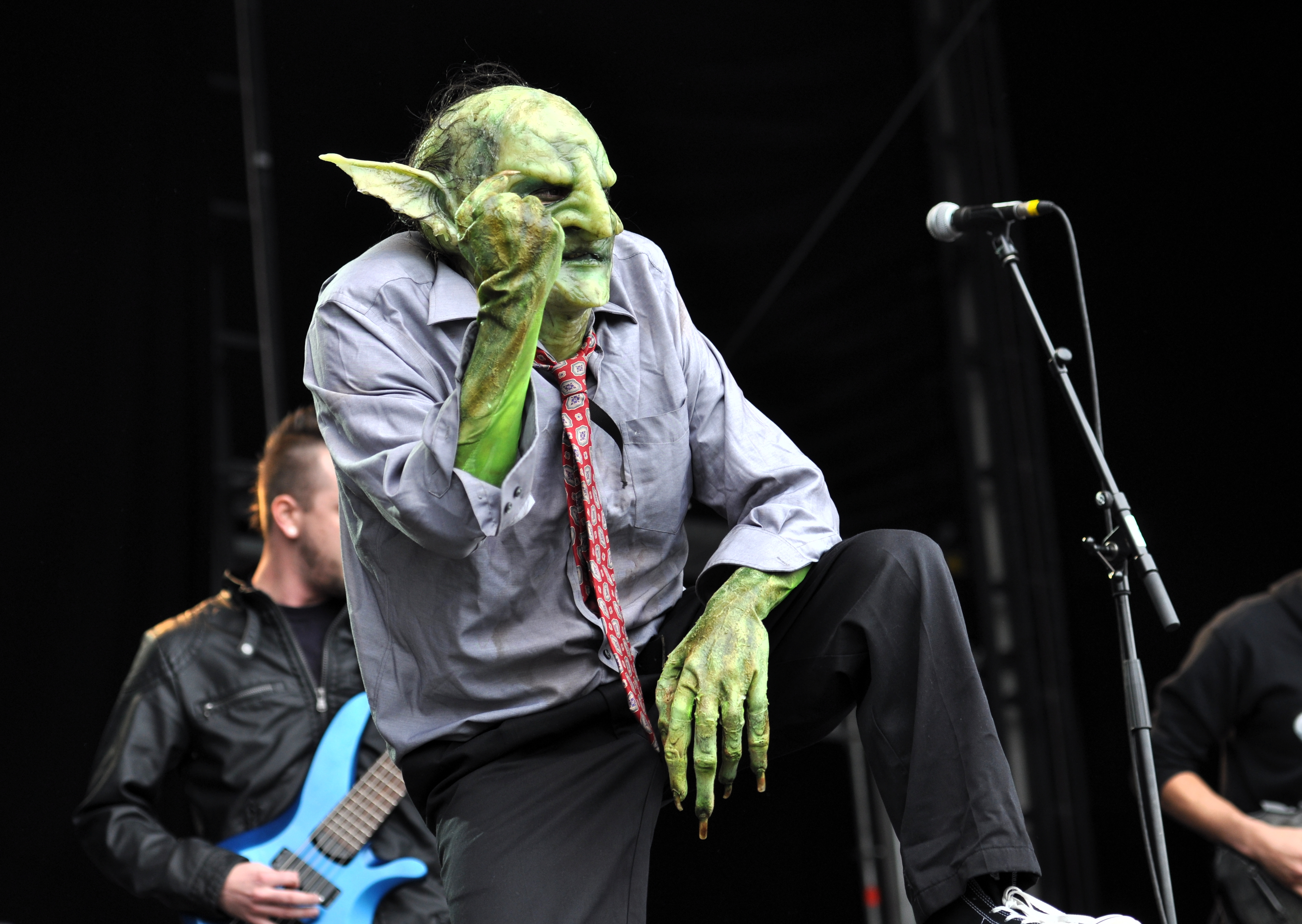
Dave Rispoli as John Goblikon at Rock am Ring 2013 in Nürburg, Germany.

In June 2013, Nekrogoblikon went on a European tour to perform at several venues and festivals, including Download Festival in England and Rock am Ring and Rock im Park in Germany.

In August 2013, Nekrogoblikon released an EP titled Power, produced by Nekrogoblikon and mixed by Matt Hyde. The album received a 2/5 review from Metal Sucks, which criticized the songwriting and described the band as a "lame joke." Sputnikmusic gave the album a 3.5/5 review, describing the album as "ridiculous," and praising the instrumentation and technicality but criticizing the vocals and inconsistency.

In 2014, Nekrogoblikon performed on the Kerrang! Tour, along with Limp Bizkit, Crossfaith, and Baby Godzilla.

=== Heavy Meta (2014–2015) ===
In January 2014, Nekrogoblikon announced through their instagram account that they were working on a new release.

On March 9, 2015, the band released the first track, "Full Body Xplosion", on their YouTube account. They also announced on Facebook that the album Heavy Meta would be released via Mystery Box, the band's own label.

On June 2, 2015, the album was released. Heavy Meta is a concept album, consisting of 10 songs that when listened to in succession, tells the story of an immortal goblin race seeking a way to finally die. The album received fairly consistent reviews with the band's previous offerings scoring a 3.5/5 on Angry Metal Guy. Metal Injection offered substantive praise for the album saying "Heavy Meta is the best album Nekrogoblikon has released so far in their career".

=== Welcome to Bonkers and "Chop Suey!" (2018-2020) ===
Nekrogoblikon released their fifth album Welcome to Bonkers, on April 13, 2018. They also released a cover of System of a Down's "Chop Suey!" on July 3, 2020.

=== The Fundamental Slimes and Humours (2021–2022) ===
On July 7, 2021, Nicky and Alex appeared on The Vanflip Podcast, and revealed the title of their sixth album as The Fundamental Slimes and Humours. On November 12, Nekrogoblikon released the first single and music video from their new album, entitled Right Now.

On January 5, 2022, Nekrogoblikon released a second single and music video titled "This Is It", from the upcoming album The Fundamental Slimes and Humours, once again directed by Brandon Dermer. On April 1, 2022, Nekrogoblikon released their sixth studio album The Fundamental Slimes and Humours. On May 18, 2022, Nekrogoblikon released a third single and music video titled "Bones", from their recently released album The Fundamental Slimes and Humours, once again directed by Brandon Dermer. On December 29, 2022, Nekrogoblikon released a single, "Bodom Beach Terror", a cover of a Children of Bodom song.

=== Departure of Calonne; new vocalists and The Boiling Sea (2023-2026) ===
On December 15, 2023, it was announced that vocalist Nicky Calonne would be leaving the band on amicable terms to "pursue a new life path" and that John Goblikon and Dickie Allen of Infant Annihilator would take his place as lead vocalists. Prior to this announcement, Allen had been touring with the band as a fill-in lead vocalist in Calonne's absence throughout their 2023 tour dates. Grady Welch was brought on to perform John Goblikon's clean singing parts.

The band performed at Milwaukee Metal Fest in 2025 and made an appearance at Welcome to Rockville in Daytona Beach, Florida in May 2026.

On April 10, 2025, Nekrogoblikon released two singles, Show Me Your Goblin and Fiend, which are the first songs to feature vocals by Dickie Allen and Grady Welch. Music videos were released for both of these songs, directed by Brandon Dermer and Dillon Markey.

On February 12, 2026, the band released a third single, Secret Elephant, featuring the ska band Reel Big Fish. This single was accompanied by a music video, once again directed by Brandon Dermer. Five days later, the band announced a new EP set to release on April 17, 2026, via their instagram account.

On April 17, 2026, Nekrogoblikon released an EP titled The Boiling Sea. It consists of six new tracks (including the previously released singles Show Me Your Goblin and Fiend, as well as Secret Elephant, featuring Reel Big Fish) and five live versions of previously recorded songs performed with the band's new vocalists, Dickie Allen and Grady Welch. An animated music video for the song Dead-ish, directed, written, and animated by Kris Baldwin, was also released.

== Other ventures ==
As John Goblikon, Rispoli hosts the podcast Right Now with John Goblikon, created and produced by Rispoli, Dermer, and Alereza. It ran as a talk show web series from 2015 to 2019 and 2021 to 2022 before being turned into a long-form podcast series in 2024. In September 2025, Right Now with John Goblikon joined Bill Burr's All Things Comedy network. Rispoli and Dermer also wrote a self-help style memoir titled John Goblikon's Guide to Living Your Best Life.

== Band members ==
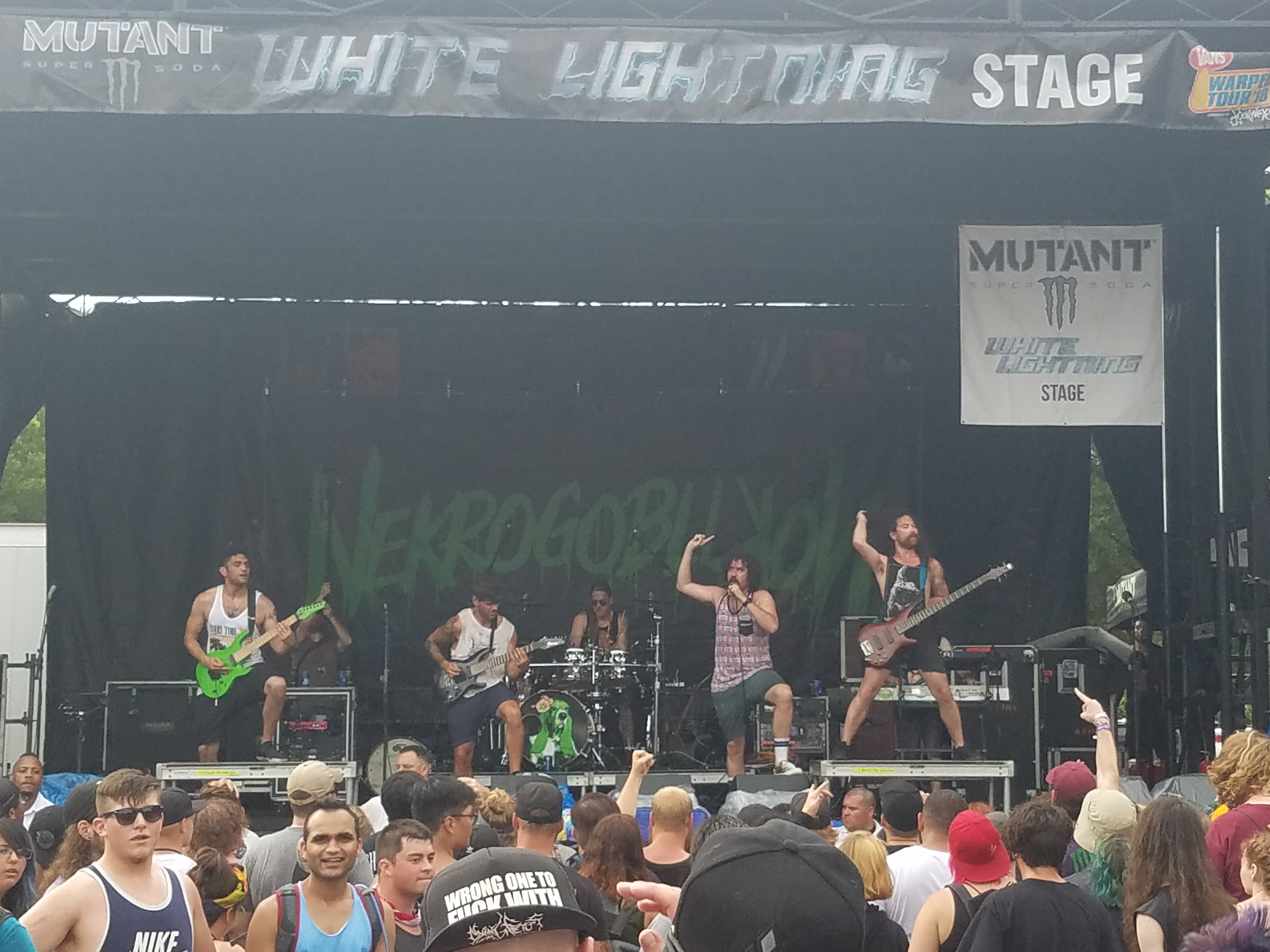
Nekrogoblikon performing during Vans Warped Tour in 2018.

=== Current ===
- Alex "Goldberg" Alereza – lead guitar, backing vocals (2007–present), bass (2011, 2019–present)
- Aaron "Raptor" Minich – keyboards, backing vocals (2011–present)
- Dave Rispoli as "John Goblikon" – mascot, video actor (2012–present); talk show host (2015–present); stand-up comedy (2025–present); touring hypeman, backing vocals (2012–2022)
- Eric William Brown – drums (2016–present)
- Joe "Diamond" Nelson – rhythm guitar (2013–2015, 2018–present), bass (2019–present)
- Dickie Allen – harsh vocals (2023–present); touring (2022–present)
- Grady James Welch as "John Goblikon" – mascot, clean vocals, touring (2022–present)

=== Former ===
- Nicky "Scorpion" Calonne – lead vocals, keyboards, sequencing, programming (2006–2023)
- Eddie Trager – drums, percussion, xylophone, glockenspiel, marimba (2007–2016)
- Brandon "Fingers" Frenzel – bass (2011–2015)
- Tim "Timbus" Lyakhovetskiy – rhythm guitar, backing vocals, drum sequencing (2006–2013), bass (2006–2007, 2011)
- Anthony DeLorenzi – keyboards (2007–2011)
- Alex Duddy – drums, backing vocals (2007–2011)
- Austin Nickel – bass (2007–2011)
- Aaron "Zoot" VanZutphen – bass, backing vocals (2015–2019)
- Ashleigh Carracino – keyboards (2007–2010)
- Spencer Bartz – drums (2007)
- Jason Kaye – lead guitar (2007)
- Bryan Kaye – drums (2007)

== Discography ==
=== Studio albums ===
Year	Album
2007	Goblin Island
2011	Stench
2015	Heavy Meta
2018	Welcome to Bonkers
2022	The Fundamental Slimes and Humours

=== EPs and Singles ===
Year	Title	Notes
2013	Power	EP
2020	Chop Suey!	Single - System of a Down Cover
2022	Golden Future	Single
2022	Bones (Live)	Single
2022	Bodom Beach Terror	Single - Children of Bodom Cover
2025	Show Me Your Goblin/Fiend	Single
2026	The Boiling Sea	EP

=== Music videos ===
Year	Song	Director
2012	"No One Survives"	Brandon Dermer
2013	"Powercore"	Brandon Dermer
2015	"We Need a Gimmick"	Brandon Dermer
2016	"Nekrogoblikon"	Randy Edwards
2018	"Dressed as Goblins"	Brendon Small
2018	"The Many Faces of Dr. Hubert Malbec"	Anthony Gonzalez
2018	"Darkness"	Kyle Fallon
2020	"Chop Suey!"	Brandon Dermer
2021	"Right Now"	Brandon Dermer
2022	"This Is It"	Brandon Dermer
2022	"Bones"	Brandon Dermer
2025	"Show Me Your Goblin"	Brandon Dermer
2025	"Fiend"	Brandon Dermer
2026	"The Boiling Sea"	
