= Power (Nekrogoblikon EP) =

EP by Nekrogoblikon
- Released: August 27, 2013
- Recorded: March–April 2013
- Genre: Melodic death metal, symphonic metal, comedy rock
- Length: 19:08
- Label: Self-released
- Producer: Nekrogoblikon

Nekrogoblikon chronology
STENCH (2011)	Power (2013)	Heavy Meta (2015)

Professional ratings
Review scores
Source	Rating
Sputnikmusic	3.5/5 stars
Angry Metal Guy	3/5 stars
Bring the Noise	8/10 stars

Power is an EP by American "Goblin Metal" band Nekrogoblikon, independently released and produced by Nekrogoblikon themselves in 2013, and was mixed by Matt Hyde.

== Reception ==
Kerrang! Magazine gave Power 5/5 Stars and Kerrang! Magazine (UK) inserted a poster of "John Goblikon" in the August 2013 issue. Power is available on Bandcamp as a digital download and on CD format. A writer for Metal Sucks magazine praised Nekrogoblikon, and wrote an article for the then upcoming release of Power.

== Lyrics ==
As the other albums by Nekrogoblikon, the lyrics are heavily based on topics such as outer space and goblins.

== Track listing ==
No.	Title	Length
1.	"Friends (In Space)"	3:30
2.	"Nothing But Crickets"	4:10
3.	"Powercore"	3:56
4.	"Bells & Whistles"	4:09
5.	"Giraffe"	3:19

== Personnel ==
=== Nekrogoblikon ===
- Nicholas "Nicky Von Doom" Calonne – lead vocals, keyboards
- Alex "Goldberg" Alereza – guitars, backing vocals
- Tim "Timbus" Lyakhovetskiy – guitars, backing vocals
- Aaron "Raptor" Minich – keyboards
- Brandon "Fingers" Frenzel – bass
- Eddie "Bready" Trager – drums, xylophone, marimba, glockenspiel, tambourine jingles

=== Production ===
- Nekrogoblikon – production
- Matt Hyde – mixing
- Chris Rakestraw – recording
- Aleks Vujovic – album art
- Nicholas Knudson – chalk art
- Aaron Marsh – album layout
