= The Power / Kanashiki Heaven (Single Version) =

Single by Cute

from the album °Cmaj9
- Released: July 16, 2014 (Japan)
- Genre: J-pop
- Label: Zetima
- Songwriter: Tsunku
- Producer: Tsunku

Cute singles chronology
"Kokoro no Sakebi o Uta ni Shitemita / Love Take It All" (2014)	"The Power / Kanashiki Heaven (Single Version)" (2014)	"I Miss You / The Future" (2014)

Music videos
- "The Power" on YouTube
- "Kanashiki Heaven (Single Version)" on YouTube

"The Power / Kanashiki Heaven (Single Version)" (The Power／悲しきヘブン (Single Version)) is the 25th major single by the Japanese female idol group Cute. It was released in Japan on July 16, 2014.

== Background ==
The CD single will be released in six versions: Limited Editions A, B, C, D and Regular Editions A, B. Both regular editions are CD-only. All the limited editions come with a DVD containing music videos, etc. and include a serial-numbered entry card for the lottery to win a ticket to one of the single's launch events. Both regular editions include a photocard.

== Track listing ==
=== Limited Editions A, C and Regular Edition A ===
CD
No.	Title	Length
1.	"The Power"
2.	"Kanashiki Heaven (Single Version)" (悲しきヘブン (Single Version))
3.	"The Power (Instrumental)" (The Power [Instrumental])
4.	"Kanashiki Heaven (Single Version) (Instrumental)" (悲しきヘブン (Single Version) [Instrumental])

Limited Edition A DVD
No.	Title	Length
1.	"The Power (Music Video)"	04:31

Limited Edition C DVD
No.	Title	Length
1.	"The Power (Dance Shot Ver.)"	04:09
2.	"The Power (Jacket / MV Satsuei Making Eizō)" (The Power (ジャケット・MV撮影メイキング映像) "Jacket / music video making-of video")	12:50

=== Limited Editions B, D and Regular Edition B ===
CD
No.	Title	Length
1.	"Kanashiki Heaven (Single Version)" (悲しきヘブン (Single Version))
2.	"The Power"
3.	"Kanashiki Heaven (Single Version) (Instrumental)" (悲しきヘブン (Single Version) [Instrumental])
4.	"The Power (Instrumental)" (The Power [Instrumental])

Limited Edition B DVD
No.	Title	Length
1.	"Kanashiki Heaven (Single Version) (Music Video)"	04:50

Limited Edition D DVD
No.	Title	Length
1.	"Kanashiki Heaven (Single Version) (Dance Shot Ver.)"	04:15
2.	"Kanashiki Heaven (Single Version) (Jacket / MV Satsuei Making Eizō)" (悲しきヘブン (Single Version) (ジャケット・MV撮影メイキング映像) "Jacket / music video making-of video")	10:45

=== Bonus ===
- Sealed into all the limited editions:
  - Event ticket lottery card with a serial number
- Sealed into the first press of all the regular editions:
  - Photocard, random out of several types (Regular Edition A: 1 group photo and 5 solo member photos in the costumes for "The Power", Regular Edition B: 1 group photo and 5 solo member photos in the costumes for "Kanashiki Heaven (Single Version)")

== Charts ==
Chart (2014)	Peak position
Oricon Weekly Singles Chart	3
