= Power Twins =

Power Twins may refer to:

- Larry Sontag (Larry Power) and David Sontag (Dave Power) Power Twins (wrestling), American wrestlers during the 1980s and 1990s, former International World Class Championship Wrestling personnel and other promotions
- Diane and Elaine Klimaszewski, the Klimaszewski Twins, or Power Twins, Polish American models and wrestlers
