= Power (Fast novel) =

1962 novel by Howard Fast

- Cover of the 1962 Doubleday edition
- Author: Howard Fast
- Language: English
- Publication date: 1962

Power is a 1962 novel by Howard Fast detailing the rise of the fictional Benjamin Holt, leader of the International Miner's Union, in the 1920s and 1930s.

Written from the perspective of a journalist – Alvin Cutter – it follows Ben Holt's life from a number of different perspectives, from meeting his wife to becoming a leading light in the industrial trade union movement.

== Reception ==
Lenny Yoldi of The Arizona Republic wrote: "A piece of American history comes to vibrant life in the pages of Power. In a flowing style, Howard Fast brilliantly tells the story of a man who converts thirst for personal power into a labor crusade." William H. Stauffer of the Richmond Times-Dispatch wrote: "There is quite as much truth as fiction in this pungently told story, and once read it will be remembered." Robert Hilburn of the Valley Times opined that Fast, while a "natural writer", is "undisciplined and lacking in perspective", and that the novel is "showing what George Orwell showed so much better in Animal Farm."
