= The Power (Watson novel) =

1987 novel by Ian Watson

The Power is a novel by Ian Watson published in 1987.

== Plot summary ==
The Power is a novel in which a nuclear apocalypse occurs after confrontations involving nuclear bases and peace camps.

== Reception ==
Dave Langford reviewed The Power for White Dwarf #96, and stated that "for all his acuteness, Watson isn't immune to this genre's habitual gloating tone of 'Look, Mummy, see how disgusting I can be....'"

== Reviews ==
- Review by Michael Fearn (1987) in Vector 141
- Review by Terry Broome (1987) in Paperback Inferno, #69
