= Powerful =

Powerful may refer to:

- HMS Powerful, four ship and two training establishments of the Royal Navy
- Powerful-class cruiser, a class of two Royal Navy protected cruisers
- Haakon Sigurdsson (c. 937–995), de facto ruler of Norway from about 975 to 995, sometimes called Haakon the Powerful
- Powerful (song), a 2015 song by Major Lazer

== See also ==
- Dynatoi (English: "powerful"), a Byzantine Empire legal term for the senior levels of civil, military and ecclesiastic officialdom
- Hyang, a representation of the supreme being in ancient Java and Balinese mythology, also referred to as Sang Hyang Kersa ("the Powerful")
- Powerful owl, a species of owl native to Australia
