= Fantasy Newsletter =

Fantasy fanzine

Cover of Issue 21 (July 1980)

Fantasy Newsletter, later renamed Fantasy Review, was a major fantasy fanzine founded by Paul C. Allen and later issued by Robert A. Collins. Frequent contributors included Fritz Leiber and Gene Wolfe.

== Publication history ==
The first issue appeared in June 1978, and Allen continued publication until October 1981. It was then taken over without a break by Collins, director of the International Conference on the Fantastic in the Arts at Florida Atlantic University. At the beginning of 1984, it was combined with Science Fiction and Fantasy Book Review, and given a new title, Fantasy Review. At this point, it became a semi-prozine, with substantial bookstore sales, and provided the widest coverage of science fiction and fantasy books then in existence. The magazine folded with issue #103, July/August 1987, but the review section continued as Science Fiction and Fantasy Book Review Annual well into the 1990s.

== Reception ==
In Issue 13 of Abyss, Dave Nalle called this "well-edited ... an ultimately valuable magazine for anyone interested in reading fantastic fiction." Nalle noted that it was "a varied magazine, with columns for writers by Fritz Leiber and other names, movie reviews by Bill Warren, and all sorts of book reviews." Nalle concluded, "It is really invaluable to anyone who cruises the bookstores waiting for new releases. It lets you know what you can look forward to."" Two years later, Nalle re-reviewed the fanzine and concluded, "On the whole, Fantasy Newsletter is quite good, and a useful aid for those interested in small presses."

== Awards ==
The magazine won the Balrog Award and the World Fantasy Award. It was also 1984 finalist to the Hugo Awards, in the semiprozine category.
